= The Voice of Germany =

German television show

- Genre: Talent show
- Created by: John de Mol Jr.; Roel van Velzen
- Directed by: Mark Achterberg; Daniel Brauer; Boris Retterath
- Presented by: Stefan Gödde; Thore Schölermann; Lena Gercke; Annemarie Carpendale; Melissa Khalaj; Steven Gätjen; Matthias Killing
- Judges: Xavier Naidoo; Rea Garvey; Nena; The BossHoss; Max Herre; Samu Haber; Stefanie Kloß; Michi Beck & Smudo; Andreas Bourani; Yvonne Catterfeld; Mark Forster; Michael Patrick Kelly; Alice Merton; Sido; Nico Santos; Michael Schulte; Johannes Oerding; Sarah Connor; Elif Demirezer; Peter Maffay; Giovanni Zarrella; Bill & Tom Kaulitz; Shirin David; Ronan Keating; Kamrad; Calum Scott
- Composers: Martijn Schimmer; Klaus Badelt (Additional Music)
- Country of origin: Germany
- Original language: German
- No. of seasons: 16
- No. of episodes: 141

Production
- Executive producer: Christiane Knaup
- Production locations: Studio Adlershof, Berlin
- Production companies: ITV Studios Germany (2025-present); Bildergarten Entertainment (2021-2024); Talpa (2011–2020); Schwartzkopff TV-Productions

Original release
- Network: ProSieben; Sat.1
- Release: 24 November 2011 – present

Related
- The Voice Kids; The Voice Senior; The Voice (franchise); The Voice of Holland; The Voice (American TV series); The Voice UK

The Voice of Germany is a German reality talent show created by John de Mol Jr., based on the concept The Voice of Holland and its international series. It began airing on ProSieben and Sat.1 on 24 November 2011.

There are five different stages to the show: producers' auditions, blind auditions, battle rounds, sing offs, and live shows. Since season thirteen, the sing offs have been replaced with the teamfights. There have been fifteen winners to date: Ivy Quainoo, Nick Howard, Andreas Kümmert, Charley Ann Schmutzler, Jamie-Lee Kriewitz, Tay Schmedtmann, Natia Todua, Samuel Rösch, Claudia Emmanuela Santoso, Paula Dalla Corte, Sebastian Krenz, Anny Ogrezeanu, Malou Lovis Kreyelkamp, Jennifer Lynn, and the latest Anne Mosters.

The show was originally presented by Stefan Gödde, then Thore Schölermann from 2012 to 2025, and Matthias Killing from 2026 onwards. Lena Gercke, Annemarie Carpendale, Melissa Khalaj, Steven Gätjen have served as backstage and part-time presenter on the show, with Khalaj becoming a main presenter since 2022. The coaches for the upcoming sixteenth season feature: Rea Garvey, Michi & Smudo, Shirin David, and Nico Santos. Other coaches from previous seasons include Nena, The BossHoss, Xavier Naidoo, Max Herre, Samu Haber, Stefanie Kloß, Andreas Bourani, Mark Forster, Yvonne Catterfeld, Michael Patrick Kelly, Alice Merton, Sido, Johannes Oerding, Sarah Connor, Peter Maffay, Giovanni Zarrella, Bill & Tom Kaulitz, Ronan Keating, and Kamrad. A Comeback Stage round was introduced in the ninth season where Santos was featured as an off-screen fifth coach. It continued in the tenth, eleventh and fifteenth season, where Michael Schulte, Elif Demirezer and Calum Scott served as the Comeback Stage coach, respectively.

On 5 April 2013, the kids version of the show premiered on Sat.1 and has since continued for fourteen seasons. On 23 December 2018, a seniors version of the show premiered on Sat.1, and aired for two seasons.

== Format ==
The Voice is a reality television series that features four coaches looking for a talented new artist, who could become a global superstar. As the title indicates, the coaches judge their vocal ability and not their looks, personalities or stage presence. There are four different stages: producers' auditions, blind auditions, the battle phase and live shows.

The first stage of the show is not broadcast. The producers of the show audition all the artists that submitted themselves via the form on the website. The artists selected by the producers then proceed to the blind auditions where they have to perform for the coaches. Each coach has the length of the auditioner's performance (about one minute) to decide if he or she wants that singer on his or her team; if two or more judges want the same singer (as happens frequently), the singer has the final choice of coach. However, if no coach turns around then the artist is sent home.

Each team of singers is mentored and developed by its respective coach. In the second stage, called the battle phase, coaches have two of their team members battle against each other directly by singing the same song together, with the coach choosing which team member to advance from each of four individual "battles" into the first live round. Within that first live round, the surviving four acts from each team again compete head-to-head, with public votes determining one of two acts from each team that will advance to the final eight, while the coach chooses which of the remaining three acts comprises the other performer remaining on the team.

In the final phase, the remaining contestants (Final 32) compete against each other in live broadcasts. The television audience and the coaches have equal say 50/50 in deciding who moves on to the final 4 phase. With one team member remaining for each coach, the (final 4) contestants compete against each other in the finale with the outcome decided solely by public vote.

In Season 2, the battle format was extended into the live shows. The eight contestants in one team competed in battles until one finalist is left. The winner of these battle was selected by a 50%-mixture of a coach and televoting.

In Season 3, the live show battle format was abolished after it was criticized that popular contestants had to compete against each other. The number of live shows was reduced from six to four. The knockout round where contestants who succeeded from battle rounds compete for live shows was introduced in this season. It was first seen in the third season of the American The Voice. The Cross-battle was also introduced in season 3 and was extended to season 4. In season 5, four contestants received the highest vote from the public advanced to the Live Finals regardless of what team they are from. But from the sixth season onwards, only one contestant from each team who received the highest vote out of their teams' top 3 was sent to the finals.

From Season 6 to Season 8, artists that are not selected by any of the coaches leave the stage immediately after their song and do not talk with the coaches. However, in Season 9, the show added a brand-new phase of competition called The Voice: Comeback Stage by SEAT that was exclusive to thevoiceofgermany.de. It was shown for the first time in the fifteenth season of the American version. After failing to turn a chair in the blind auditions or eliminated from battles and sing offs, artists had the chance to be selected by fifth online-coach to become a member of his person team. The two winners will compete in the live shows against the talents of the main coaches live on TV and so they can The Voice of Germany win.

== Production ==
Promotional photograph of the Coaches of The Voice of Germany (Seasons 1–2)

In early April 2011, it was announced that ProSieben and Sat.1 bought the rights for the show. Devised by John de Mol Jr., the creator of Big Brother, The Voice is based on the Dutch TV programme The Voice of Holland and is part of The Voice franchise, being based on the similar British and American format. In July 2011, ProSieben and Sat.1 began announcements of the coaches for the series. The first season aired in 2011-12 network television schedule. After a successful Season 1, Prosieben and Sat.1 decided to run another season in 2012. After the successful ratings in the blind auditions in Season 2, Prosieben and Sat.1 announced a third season in 2013. In December 2013, it was announced a fourth season, which began airing in October 2014. In June 2015, Prosieben and Sat.1 announced the fifth season for the 2015-16 network television schedule.

In the final of the fifth season, the sixth season was announced for 2017. During the seventh season, it was announced that there would be an eighth season in 2018. In the final of season 8, the ninth season was announced. On 3 November 2019, the tenth season or the anniversary season was announced, which would premiere in 2020. On 16 June 2020, Sat.1 announced that the anniversary series of the casting show The Voice of Germany will have more episodes than before.

== Coaches and presenters ==
=== Coaches ===
On 11 July 2011, ProSieben and Sat.1 announced Nena and Xavier Naidoo as the first two coaches for the first season. On 25 August 2011, Rea Garvey and the duo Boss Burns (Alec Völkel) & Hoss Power (Sascha Vollmer) from the band The BossHoss were announced as the remaining two coaches. All four coaches returned for the second season. Naidoo and Garvey did not return for season three and were replaced by Samu Haber and Max Herre. On 18 March 2014, Völkel and Vollmer from the band The BossHoss announced that they would no longer be coaches for the fourth season. Five days later, Nena also announced her exit from the show. On 27 March 2014, Michi Beck & Smudo from the band Die Fantastischen Vier were announced as The BossHoss replacement. On 3 April 2014, Haber announced on Facebook that he would coach in the fourth season. On 6 May 2014, it was announced that Herre had left the show, but Garvey returned after one season hiatus. On 3 July, Silbermond frontwoman Stefanie Kloß announced that she would replace Nena. In early May 2015, Haber announced that he would not be a coach on the fifth season. He was replaced by Andreas Bourani. The other three coaches remained on the show.

On 30 April 2016, it was announced that Garvey would leave the show and Haber would return for the sixth season, after one season hiatus. On 14 June 2016, it was announced that Michi & Smudo and Bourani would continue as coaches, whereas Kloß was replaced by Yvonne Catterfeld. For the seventh season, it was announced that The Voice Kids coach Mark Forster would be joining Catterfeld, Haber and Michi & Smudo as coaches. Bourani was therefore confirmed to have left the show. In May 2018, Haber's management confirmed that he would not be a coach for the eighth season. He was replaced by Michael Patrick Kelly. Catterfeld, Forster and Michi & Smudo all returned as coaches. On 7 April 2019, Michi & Smudo announced their departure from The Voice of Germany after five seasons. In May, Catterfeld and Kelly also announced their exits. On 26 May 2019, it was announced that Forster would remain as coach, Garvey would return as coach after a three-season hiatus, whereas Alice Merton and Sido would be joining the show for the first time. On 21 August 2019, it was announced that Nico Santos would also join season nine as the fifth coach for the Comeback Stage of the competition, increasing the number of teams and finalists from 4 to 5.

In June 2020, it was announced that Sido and Merton would not be in the anniversary series of The Voice of Germany. On 17 July 2020, it was announced that the anniversary season will include six coaches: 2 solo coaches and 2 duo coaches. The two solos were Forster and Santos and the two duos were Catterfeld & Kloß and Haber & Garvey. On 21 July 2020, it was announced that Michael Schulte would be the new Comeback Stage coach. On 9 June 2021, ProSieben and Sat.1 announced that Garvey, Haber, Kloß and Catterfeld would not be returning for the eleventh season. On 25 June 2021, ProSieben and Sat.1 announced that Johannes Oerding and Sarah Connor as new coaches of the eleventh season, with Forster and Santos returning, and Elif Demirezer as the new "Comeback Stage" coach. On 13 April 2022, it was announced that Santos, Connor and Oerding would not be returning for the twelfth season, whereas Forster would be continuing. On 12 May 2022, it was announced that Garvey and Kloß would be returning as coaches for the twelfth series, and Peter Maffay was confirmed as the new coach. In addition, after 3 seasons, it was confirmed that there would be no Comeback Stage coach. Hence, the number of finalists would be down to 4 once again. On 28 May 2023, it was announced that all four coaches from the previous season would not be returning for the thirteenth season, meaning that the panel for the thirteenth season will consist of 4 new coaches. On 6 June 2023, it was revealed that Ronan Keating, Giovanni Zarrella, Shirin David, and Bill & Tom Kaulitz are new coaches for the thirteenth season.

In April 2024, it was confirmed that Keating, Zarrella and The Kaulitz Brothers would not be returning for season fourteen. On 18 May 2024, it was confirmed that the panel would be completely refreshed once again with Kamrad debuting as a new coach for season fourteen, alongside Forster returning after a one-season absence, as well as Haber and Catterfeld who re-joined the panel after last coaching in season ten. On 18 April 2025, it was revealed that, once again, all coaches from the previous fourteenth season would not return for the fifteenth season. Two days later, it was announced that Garvey, Michi & Smudo, Santos, and David would return as coaches from their respective hiatuses for the fifteenth season. On 19 August 2025, it was announced that the "Comeback Stage" would return with Calum Scott as the coach. On 27 April 2026, it was announced that Garvey, Michi & Smudo, David, and Santos would all be returning as coaches for the sixteenth season.

The Voice of Germany coaches
Coach	Seasons															
Coach	1	2	3	4	5	6	7	8	9	10	11	12	13	14	15	16
Nena																
BossHoss																
Rea (Note: Rea Garvey and Samu Haber featured together as a duo coaching team in the tenth season.)																
Xavier																
Samu																
Max																
Michi & Smudo																
Stefanie (Note: Stefanie Kloß and Yvonne Catterfeld featured together as a duo coaching team in the tenth season.)																
Andreas																
Yvonne																
Mark																
Michael Patrick																
Alice																
Sido																
Nico (Note: Nico Santos was featured as the "Comeback Stage" coach in the ninth season, and then as a main coach from the tenth season onwards.)									CS							
Michael (Note: Michael Schulte was the "Comeback Stage" coach in the tenth season.)										CS						
Johannes																
Sarah																
Elif (Note: Elif is the "Comeback Stage" coach in the eleventh season.)											CS					
Peter																
Shirin																
Giovanni																
Bill & Tom																
Ronan																
Kamrad																
Calum (Note: Calum Scott is the "Comeback Stage" coach in the fifteenth season.)															CS	

Coaches gallery

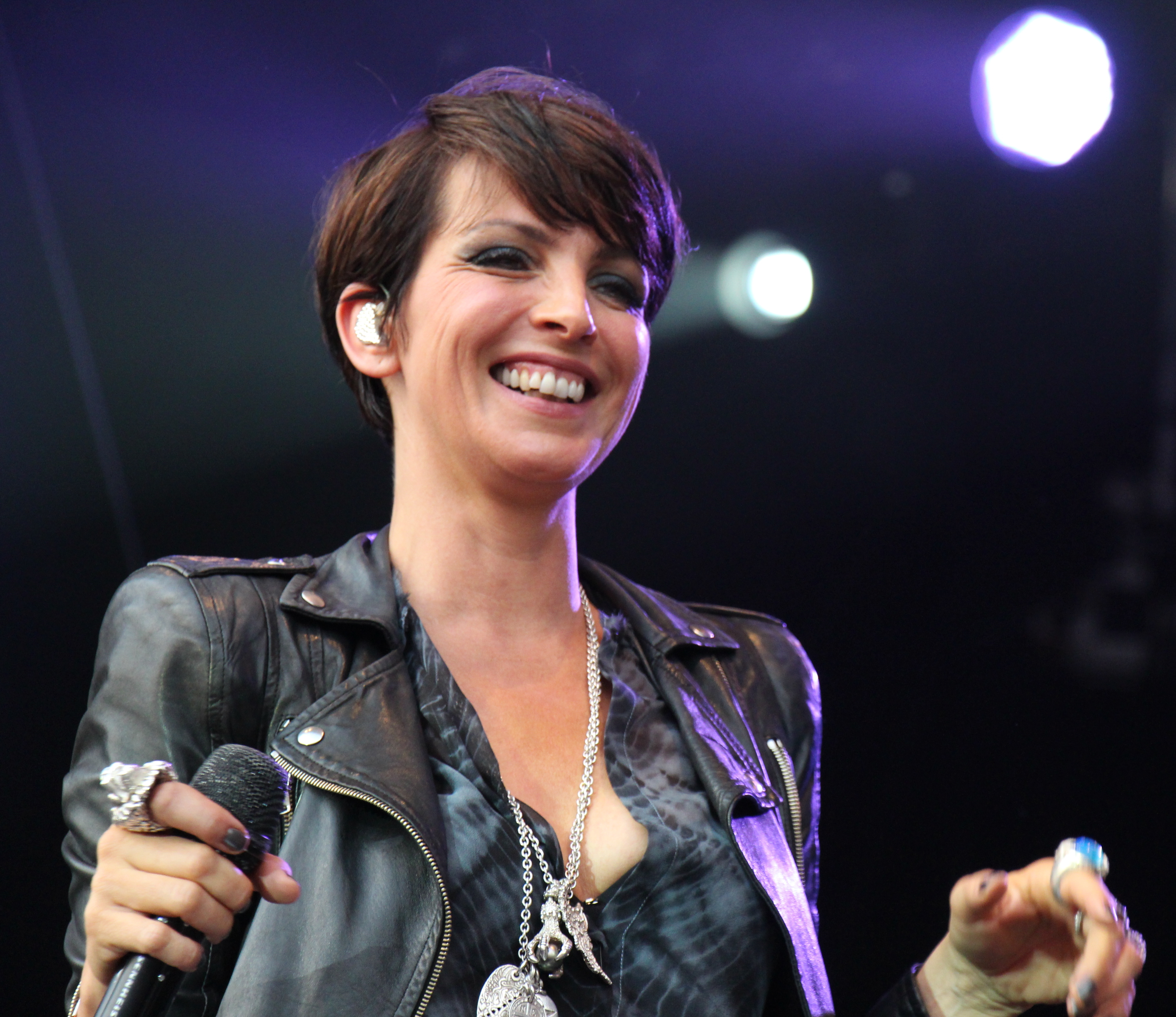
Nena (2011–2013)

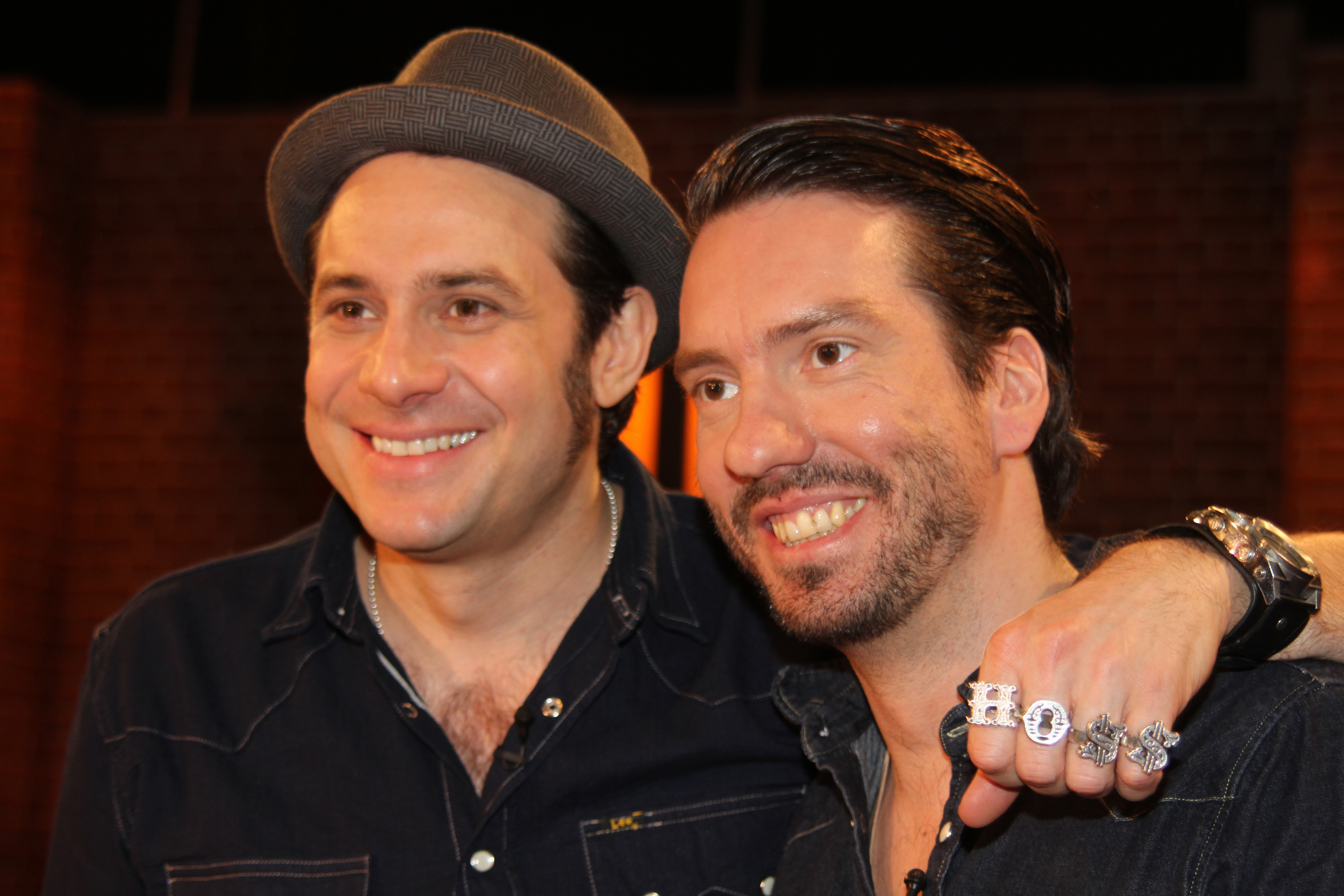
The BossHoss (duo, 2011–2013)

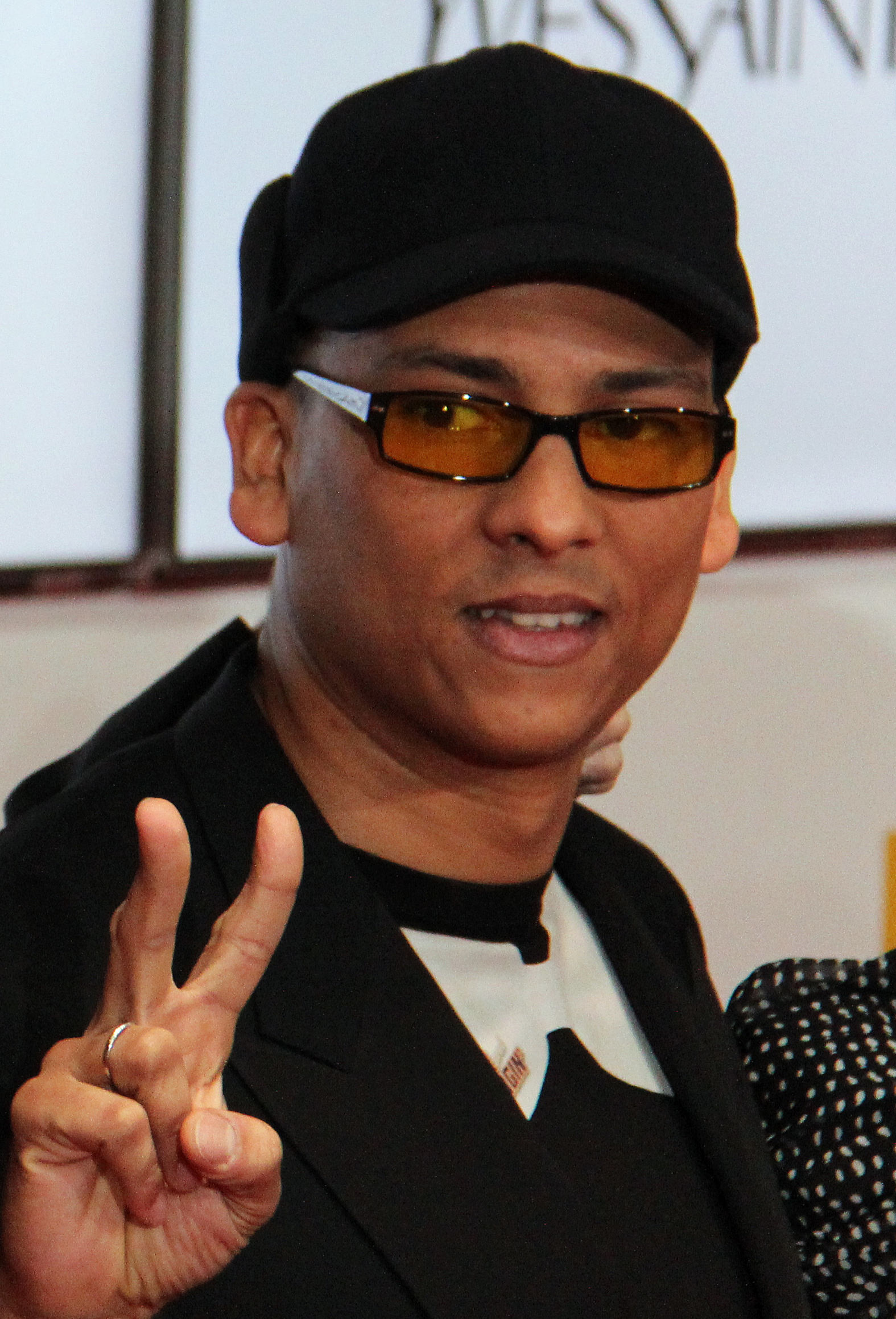
Xavier Naidoo (2011–2012)

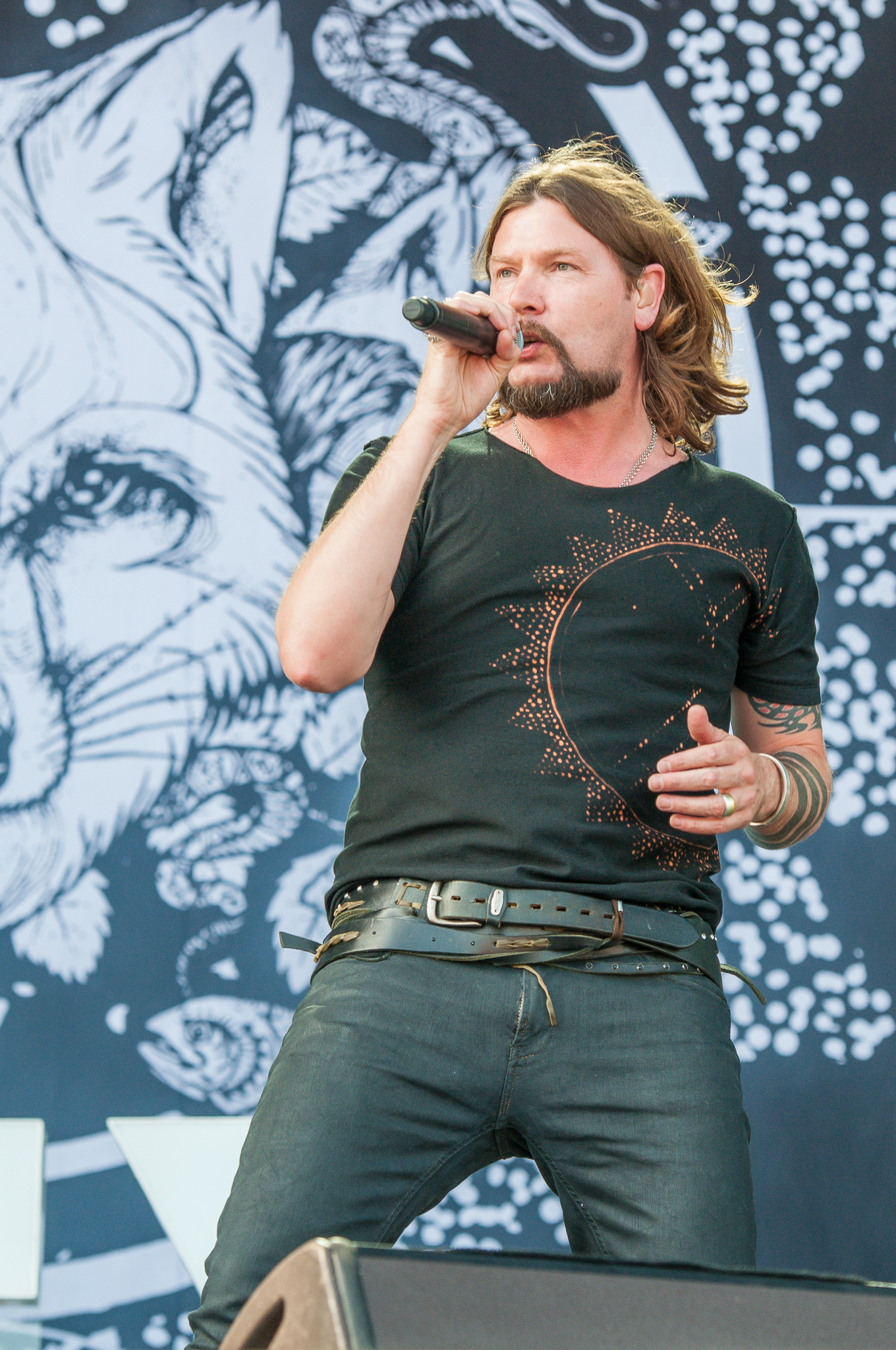
Rea Garvey (solo, 2011–2012, 2014–2015, 2019, 2022, 2025–; duo, 2020,)

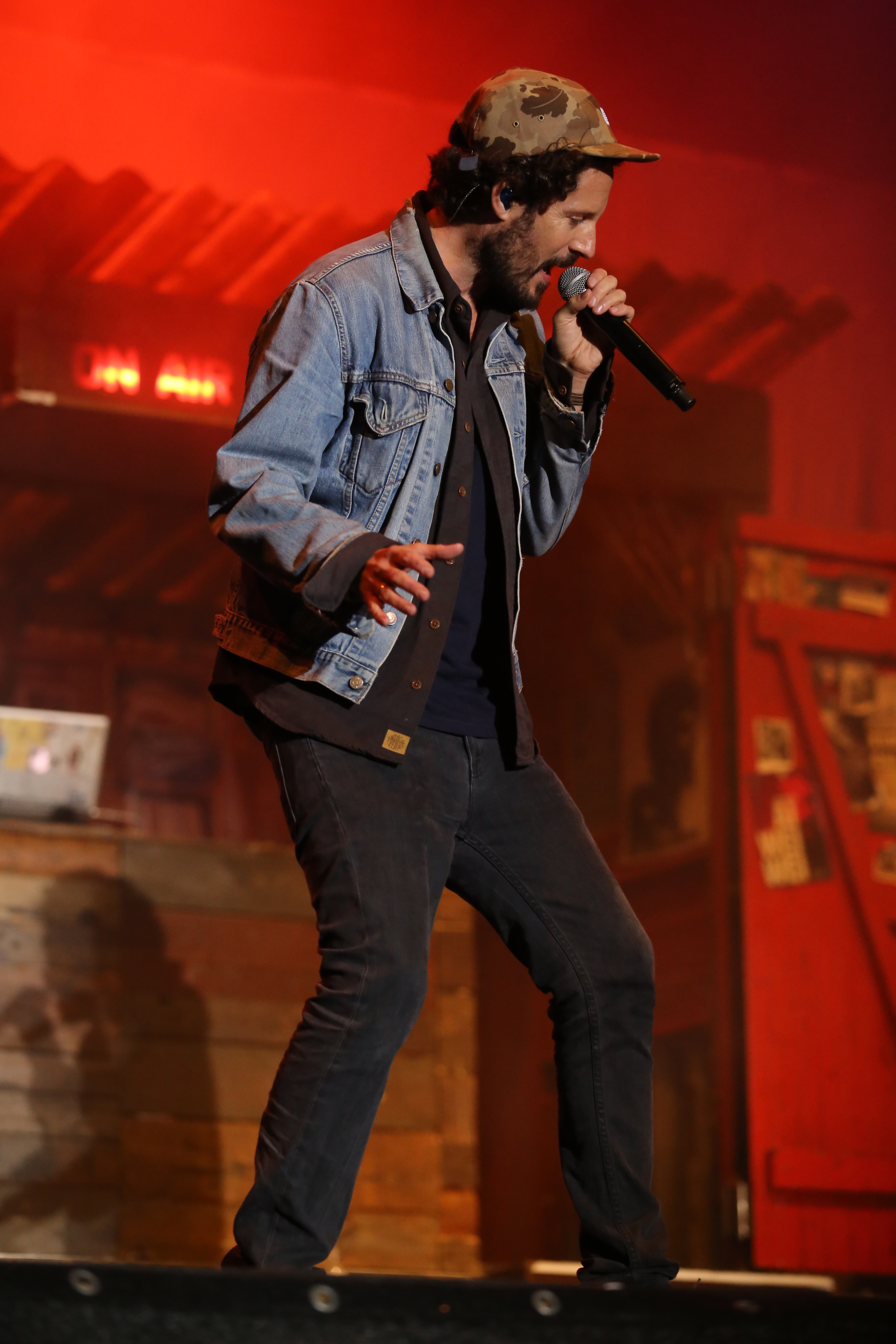
Max Herre (2013)

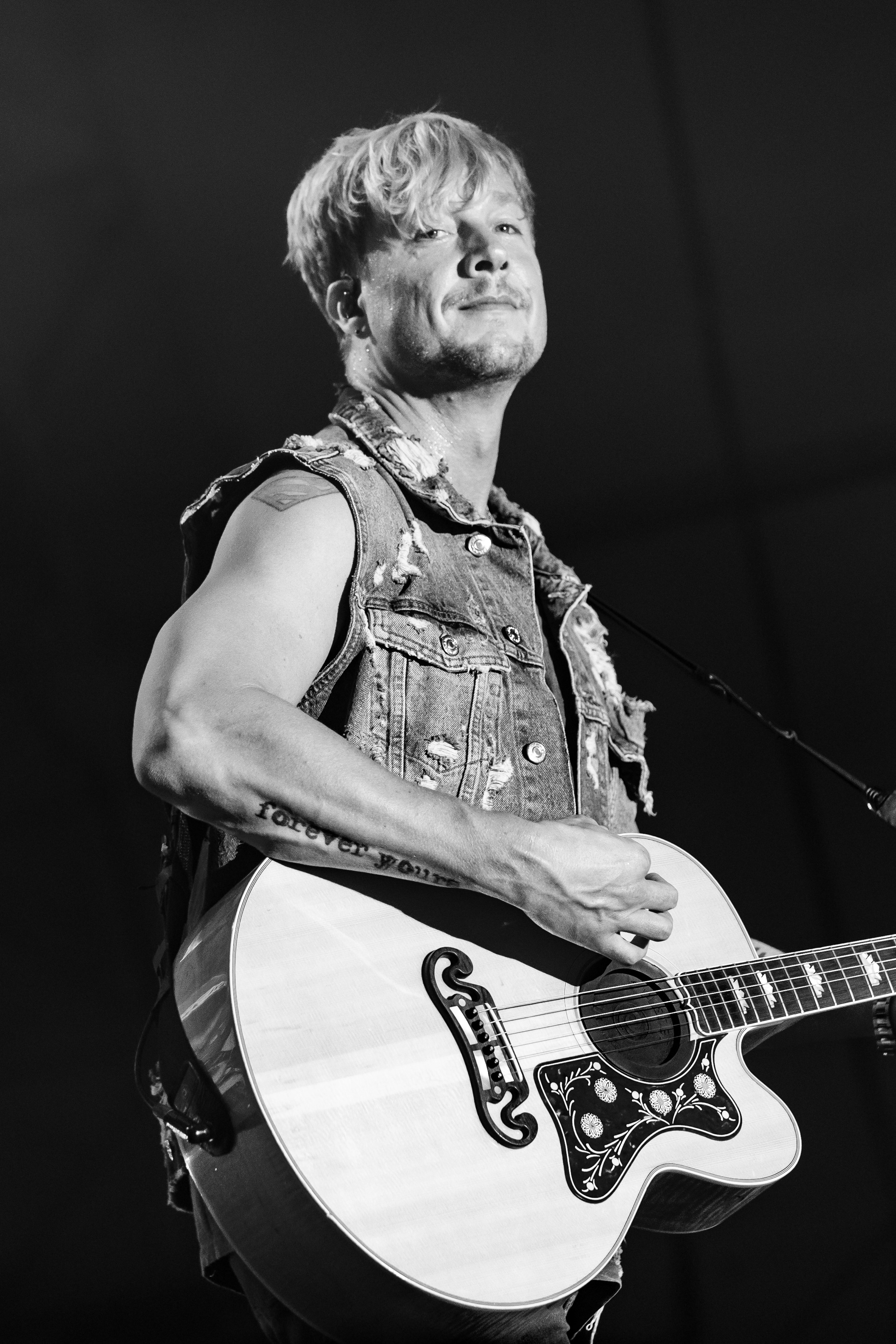
Samu Haber (solo, 2013–2014, 2016–2017, 2024; duo, 2020)

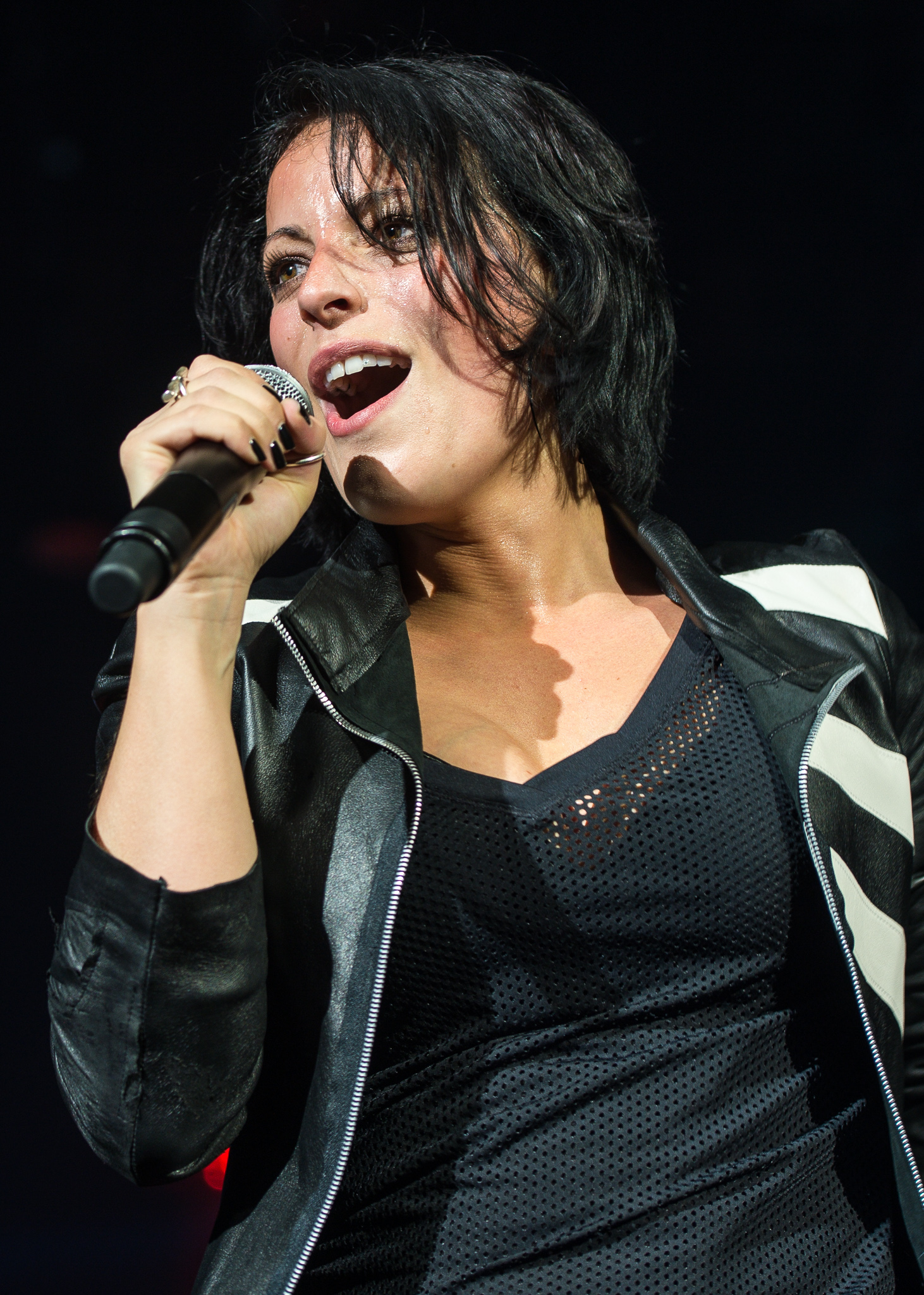
Stefanie Kloß (solo, 2014–2015, 2022; duo, 2020)

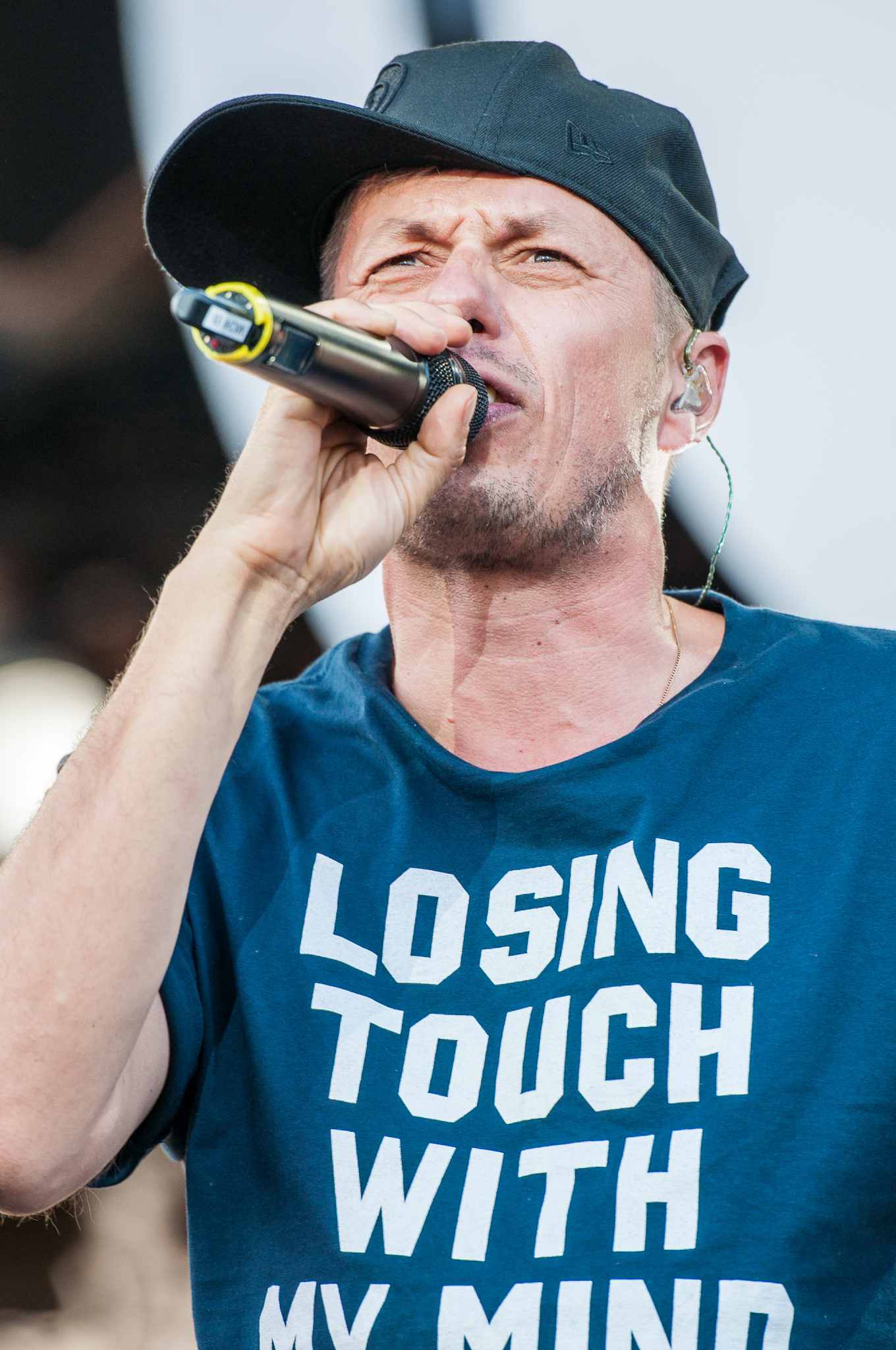
Michi Beck (duo, 2014–2018, 2025–)

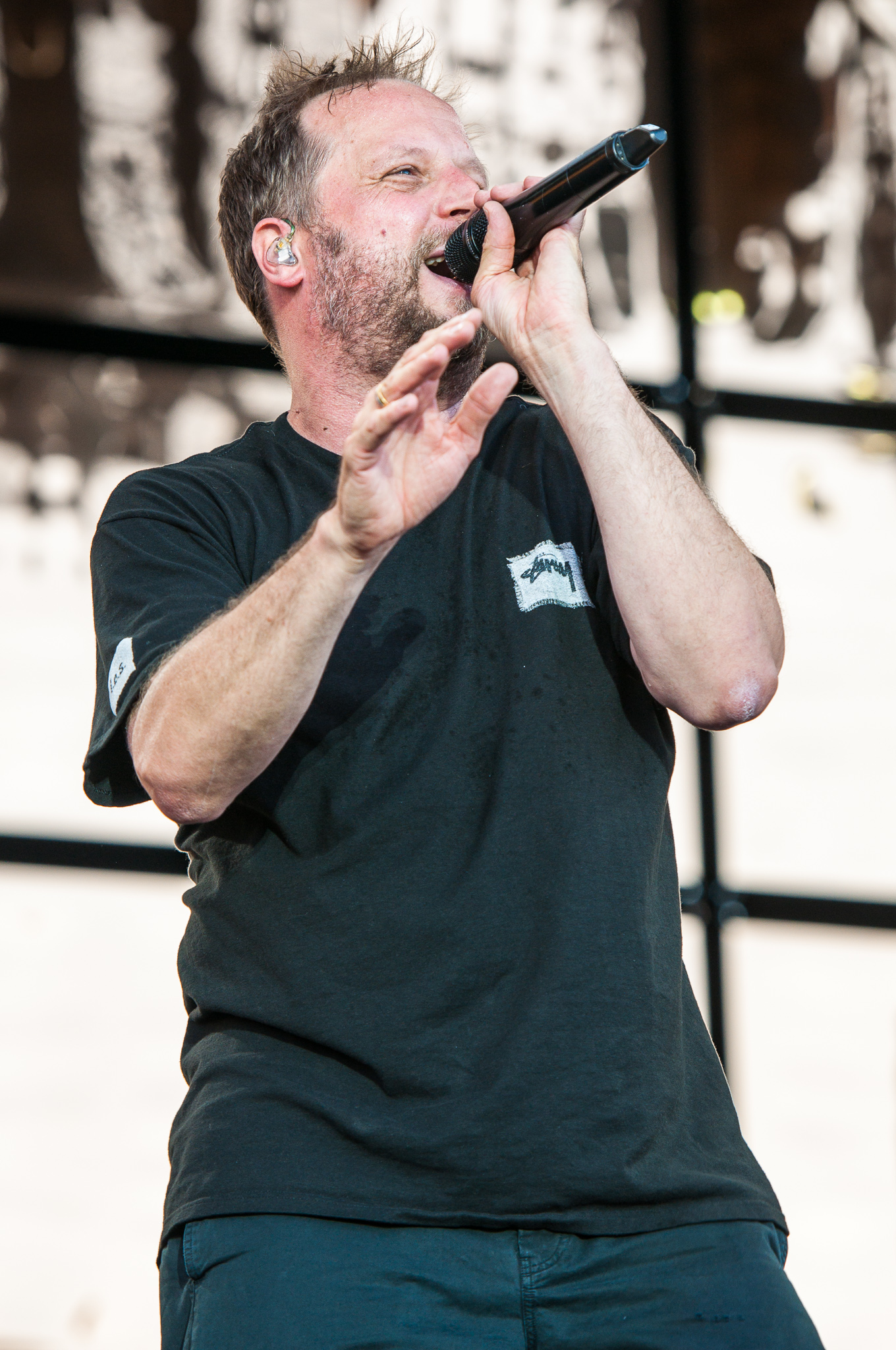
Smudo (duo, 2014–2018, 2025–)

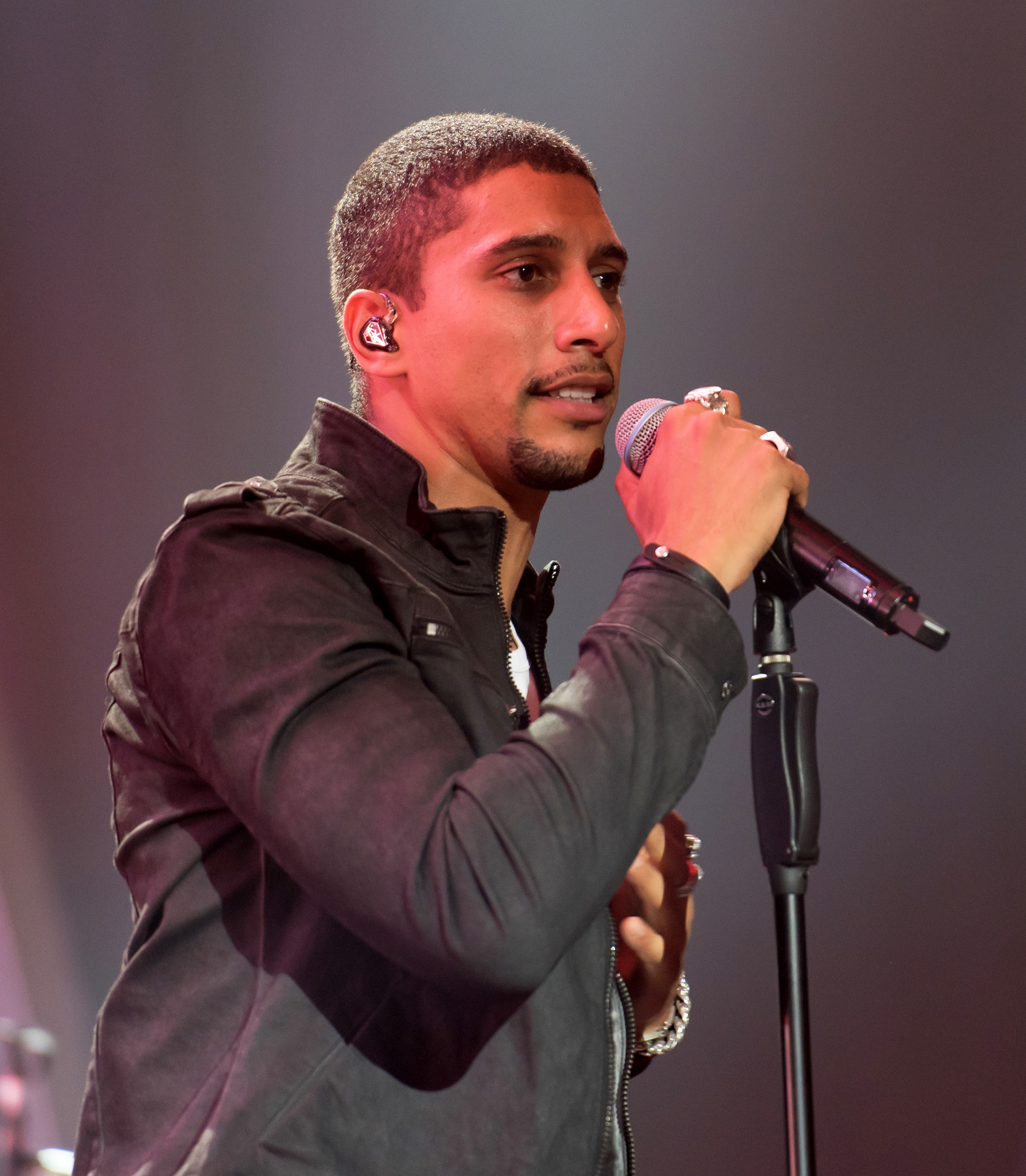
Andreas Bourani (2015–2016)

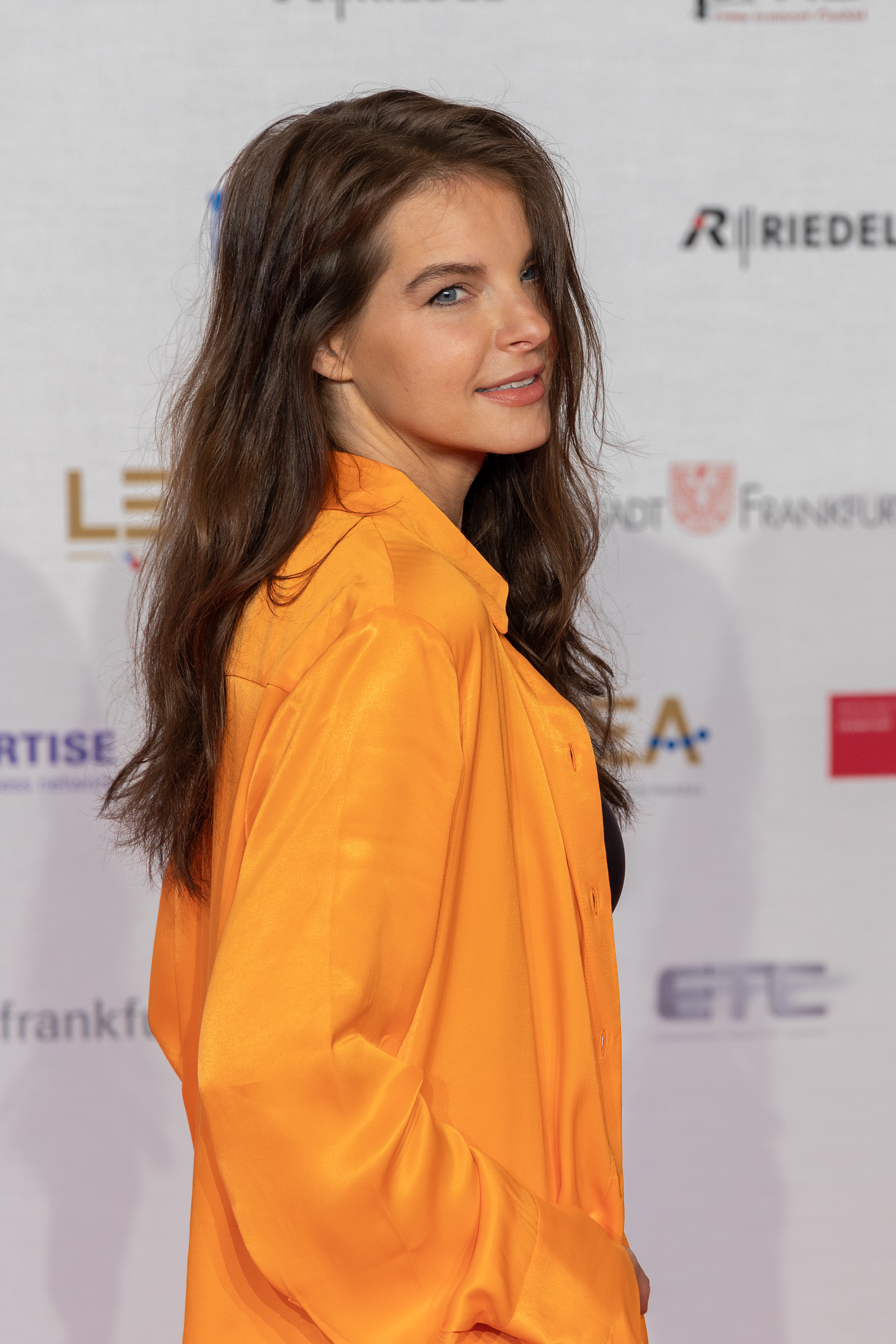
Yvonne Catterfeld (solo, 2016–2018, 2024; duo, 2020)

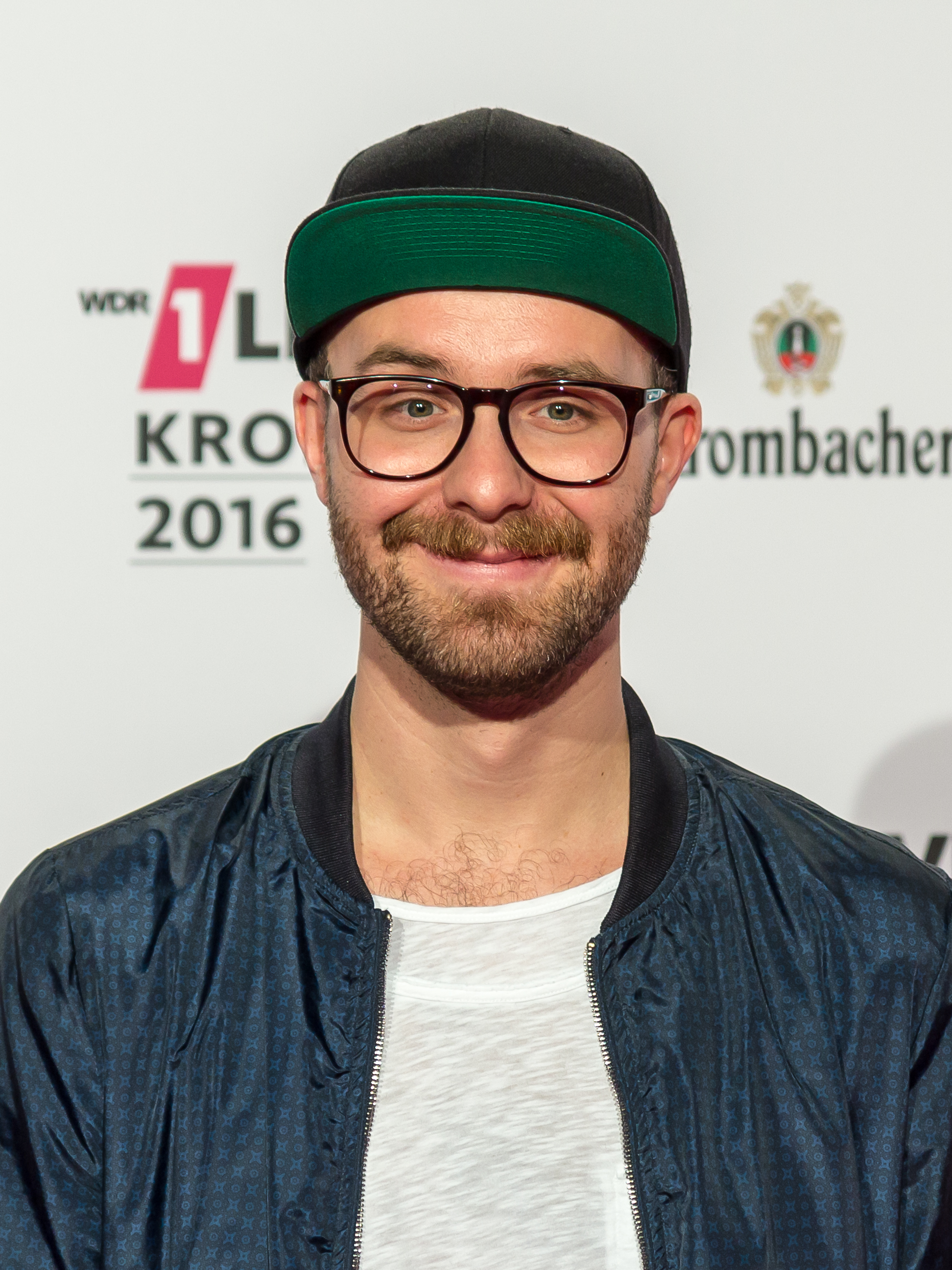
Mark Forster (2017–2022, 2024)

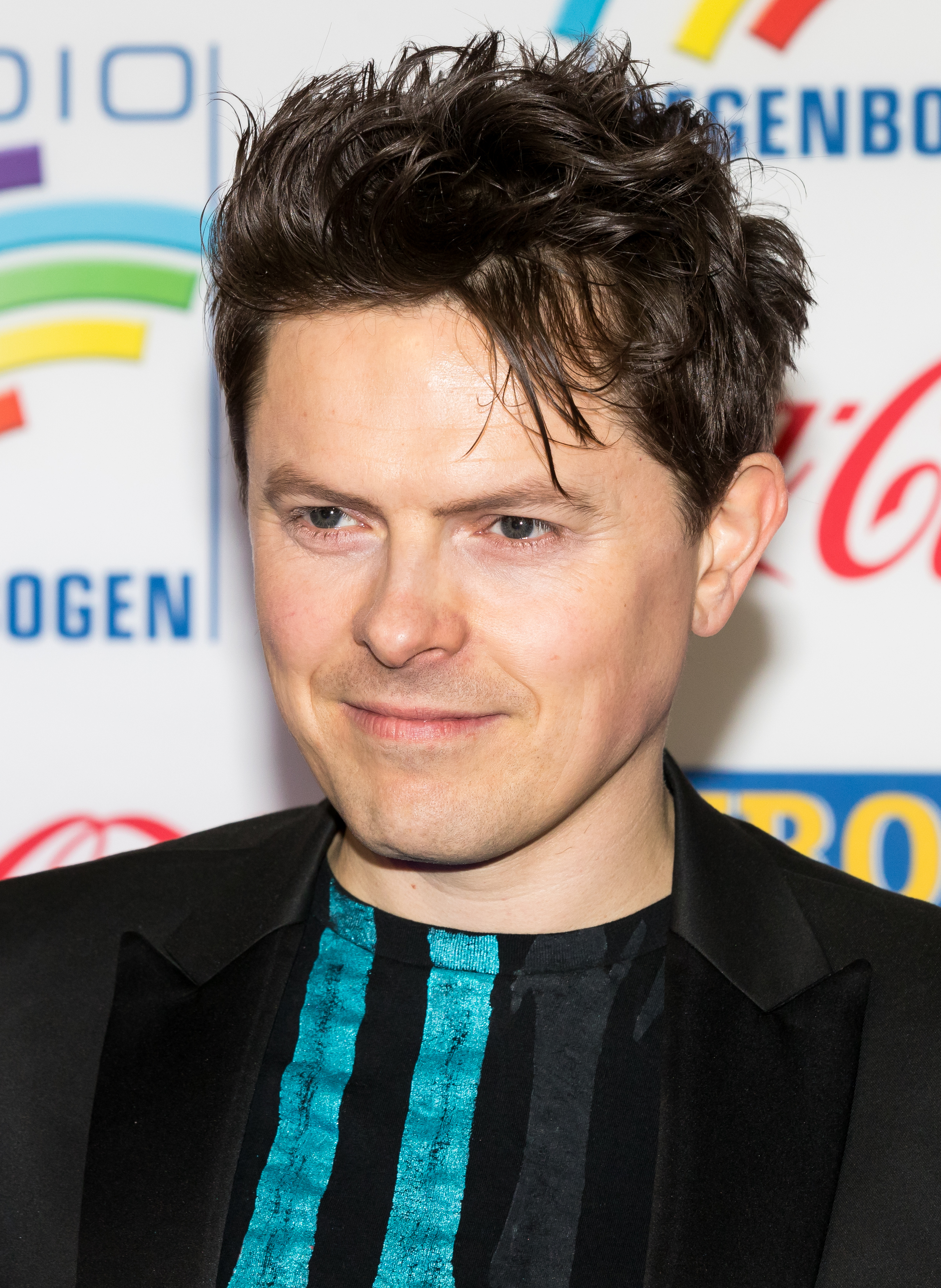
Michael Patrick Kelly (2018)

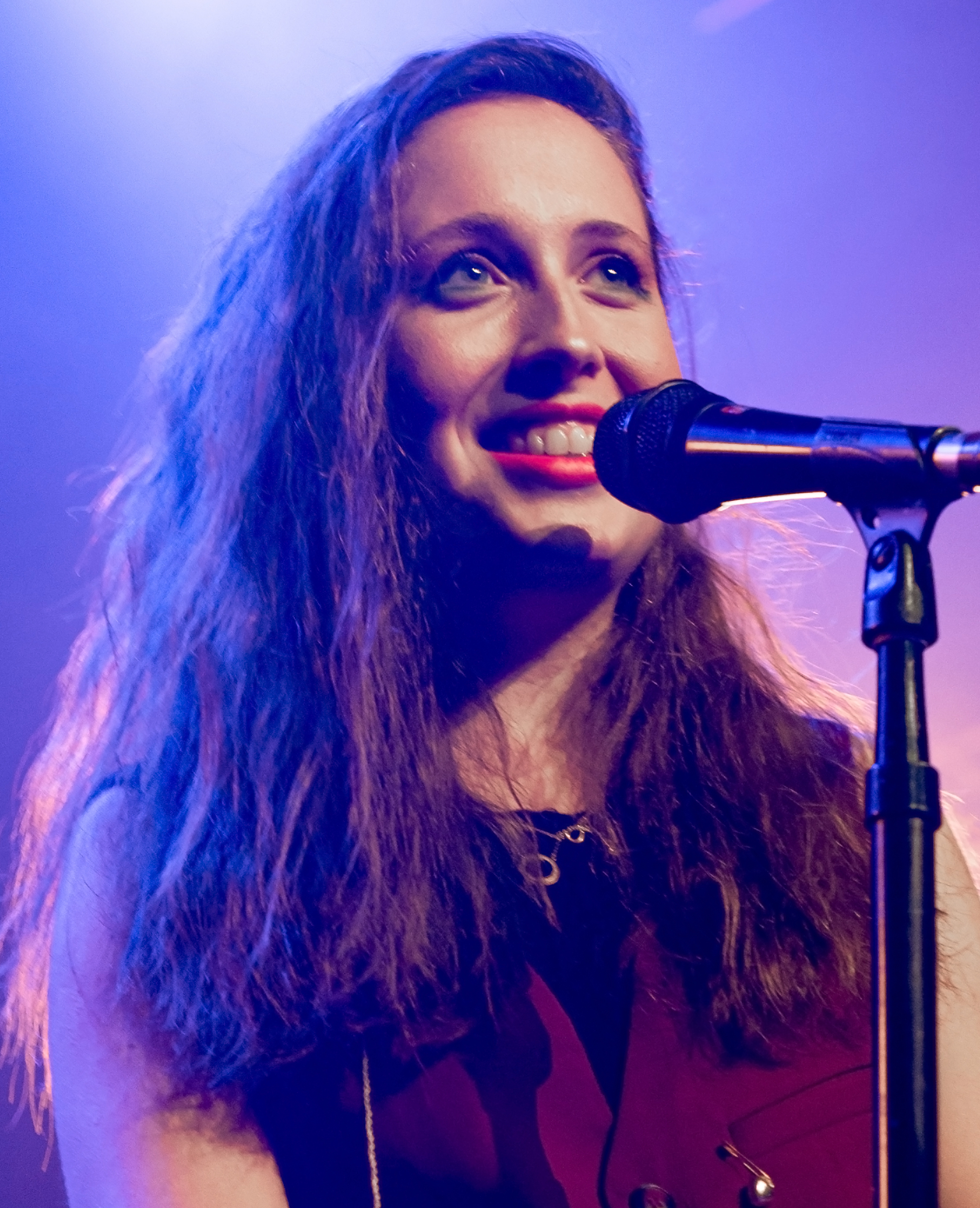
Alice Merton (2019)

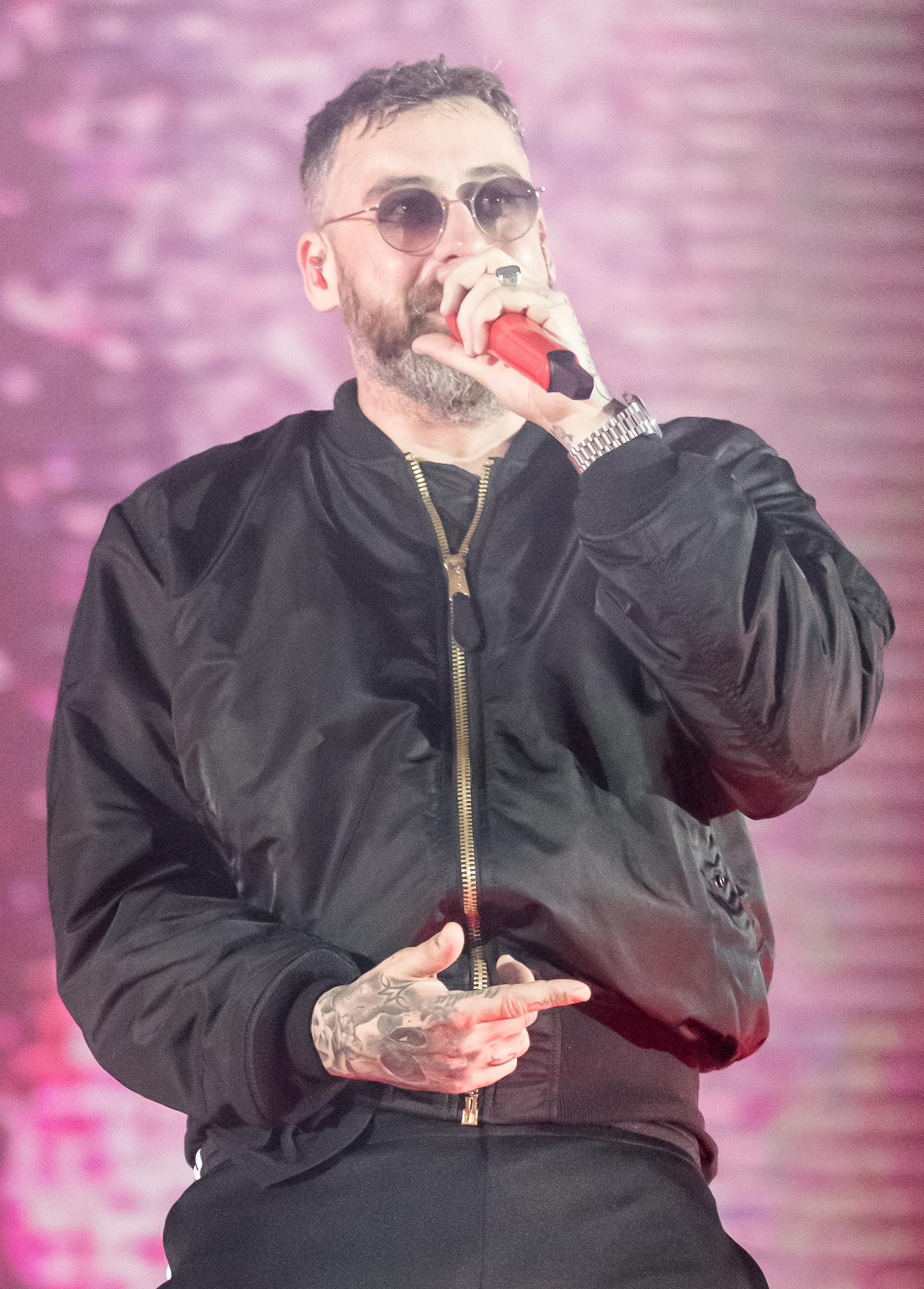
Sido (2019)

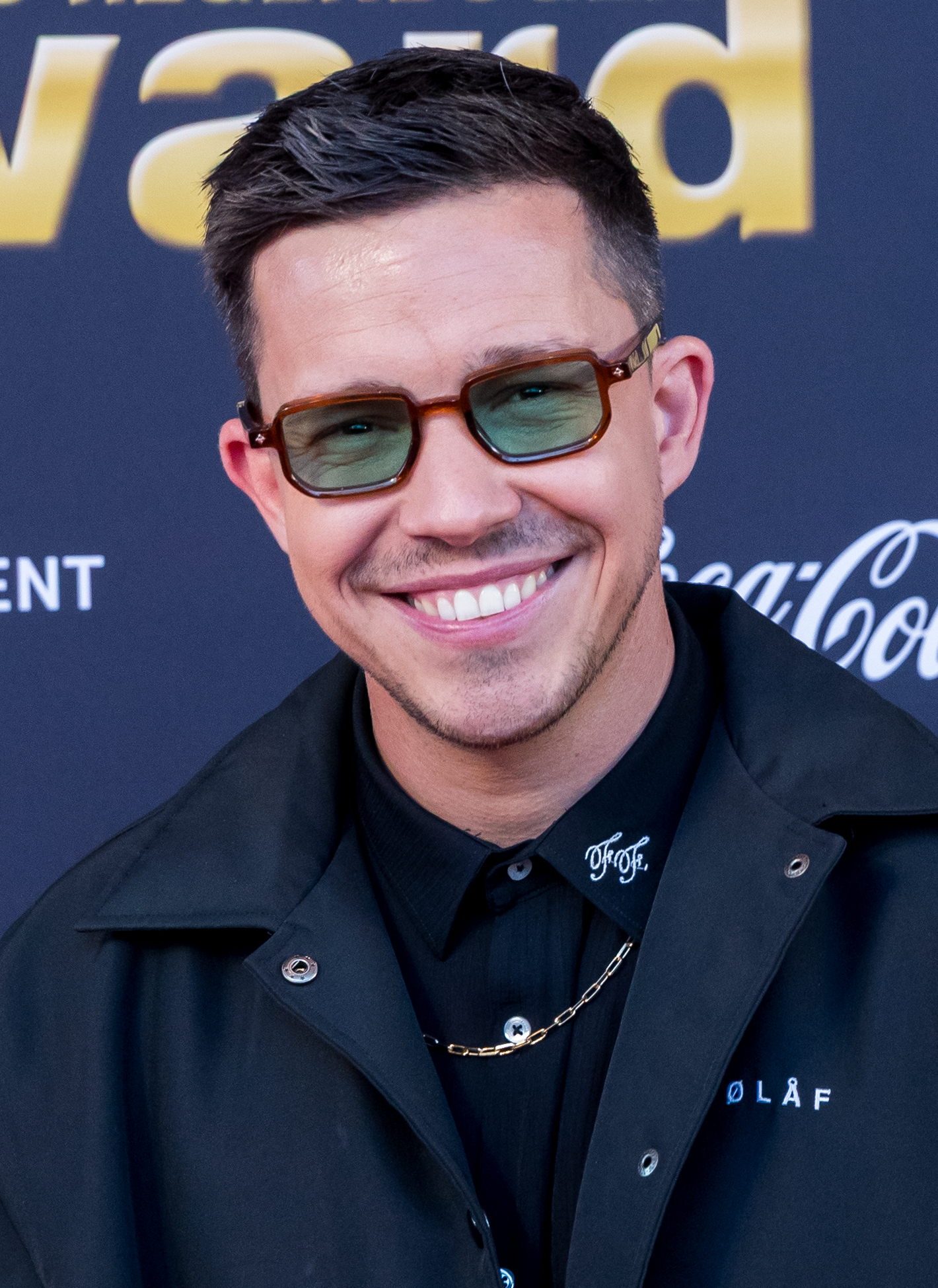
Nico Santos (Comeback Stage, 2019; 2020–2021, 2025–)

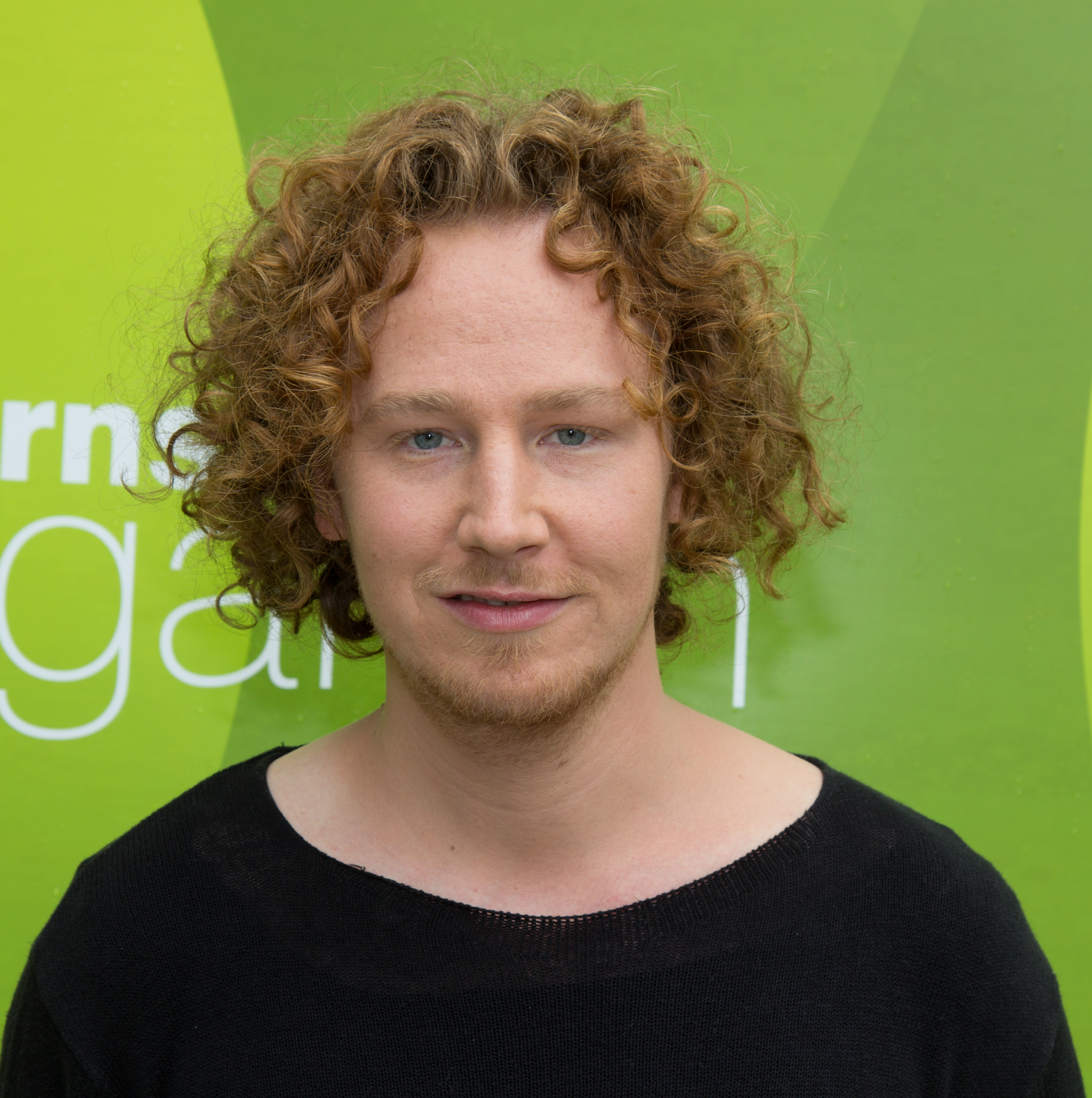
Michael Schulte (Comeback Stage, 2020)

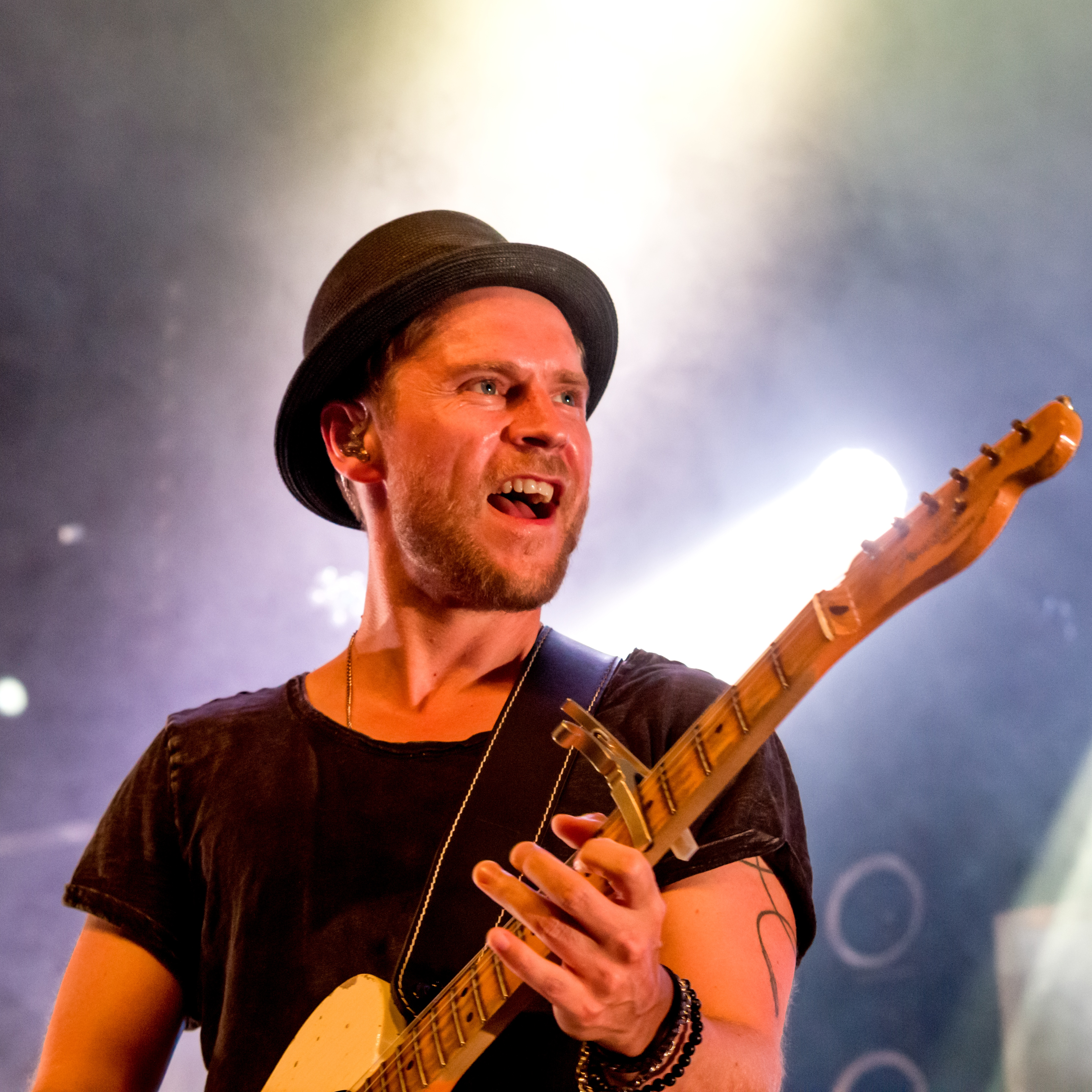
Johannes Oerding (2021)

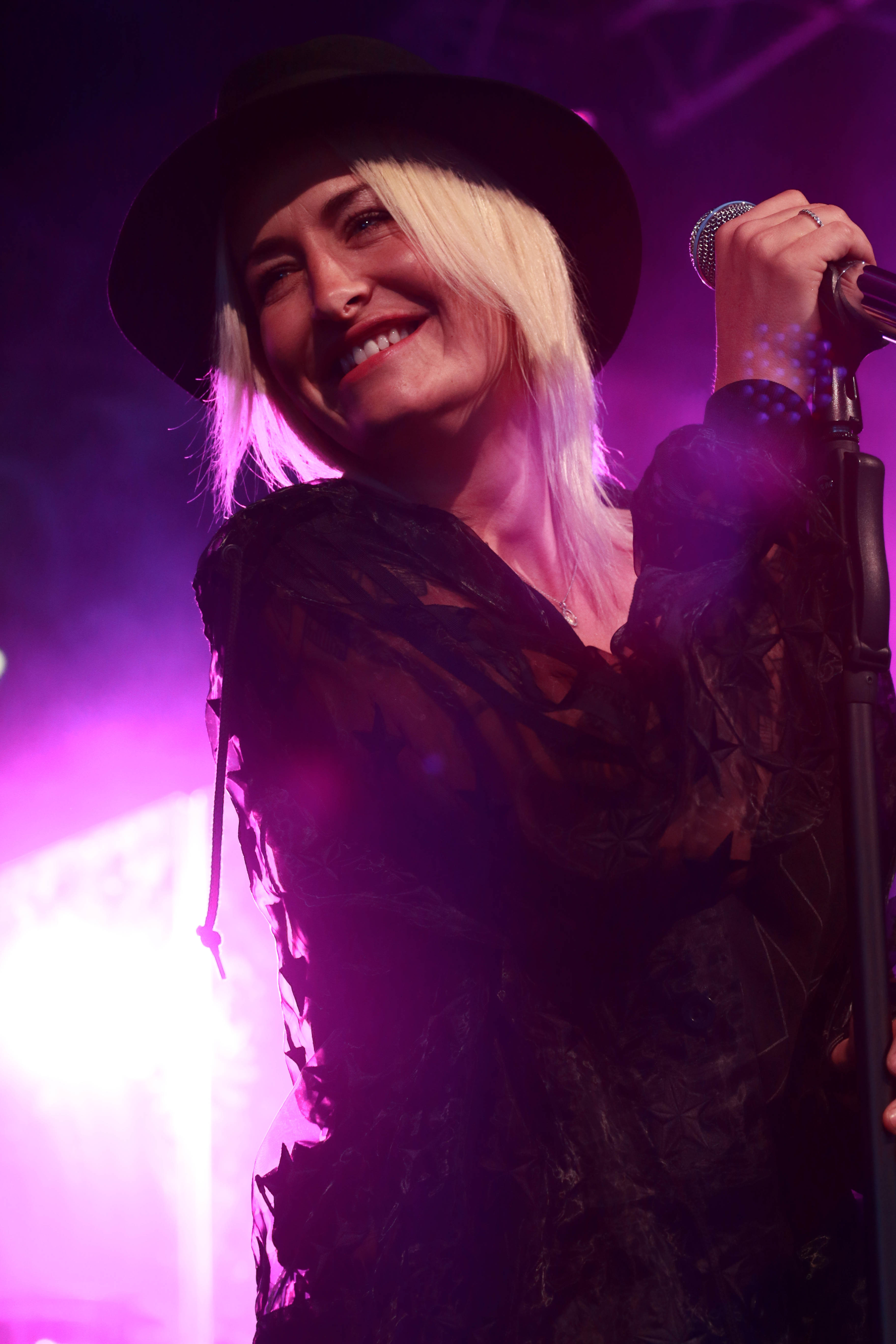
Sarah Connor (2021)

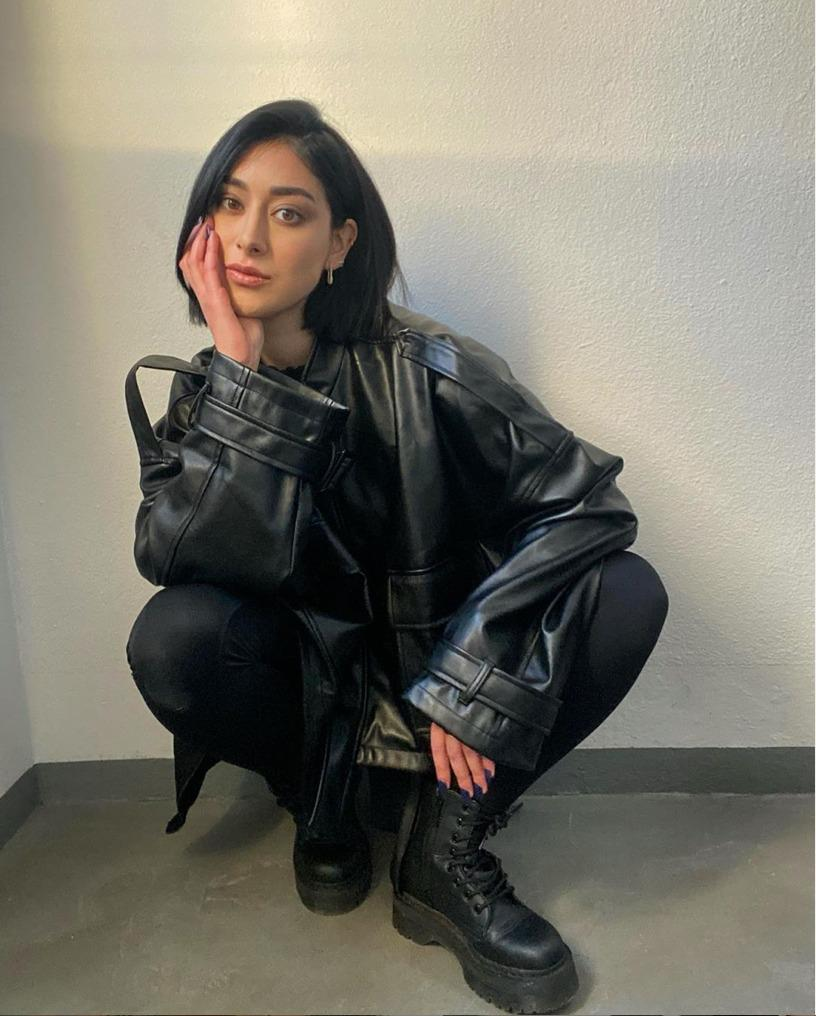
Elif (Comeback Stage, 2021)

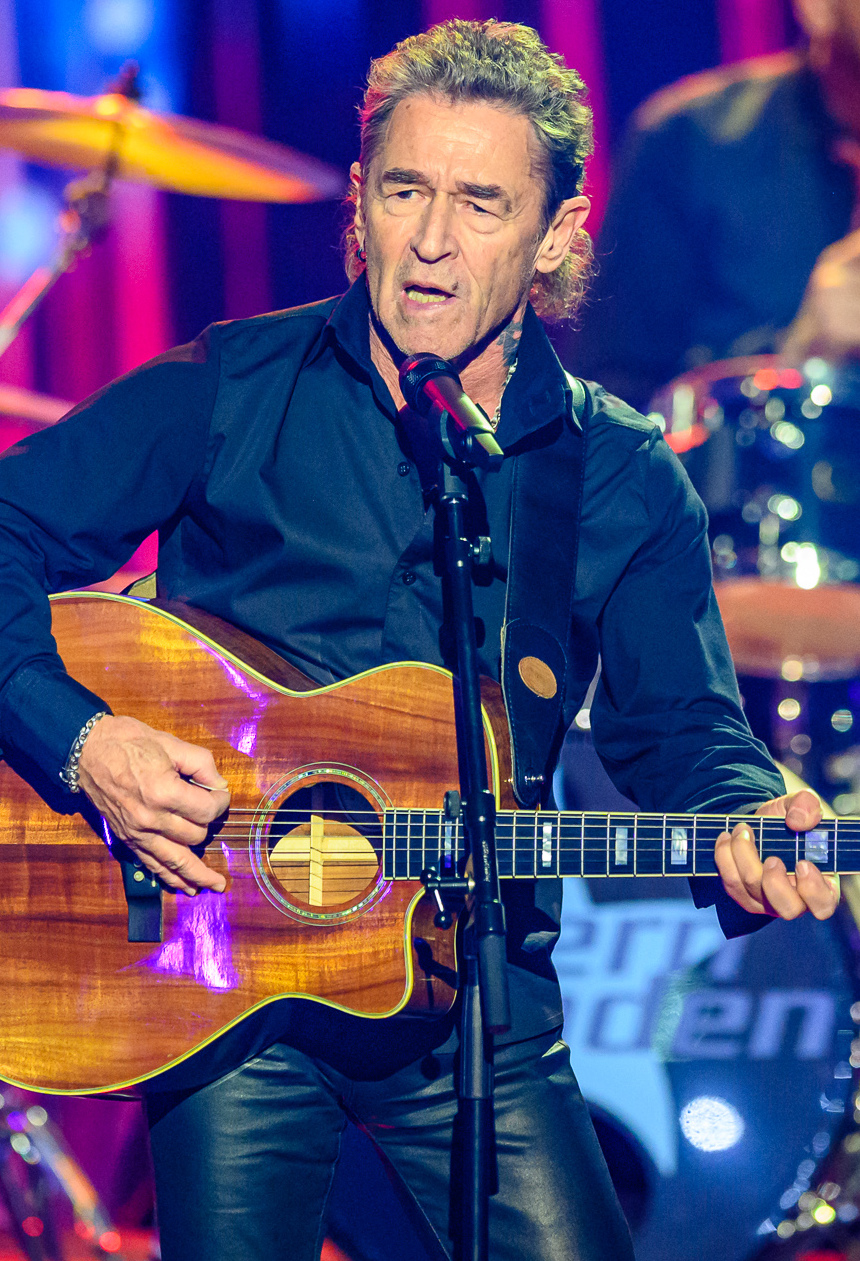
Peter Maffay (2022)

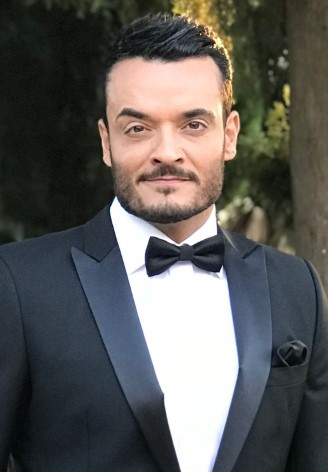
Giovanni Zarrella (2023)

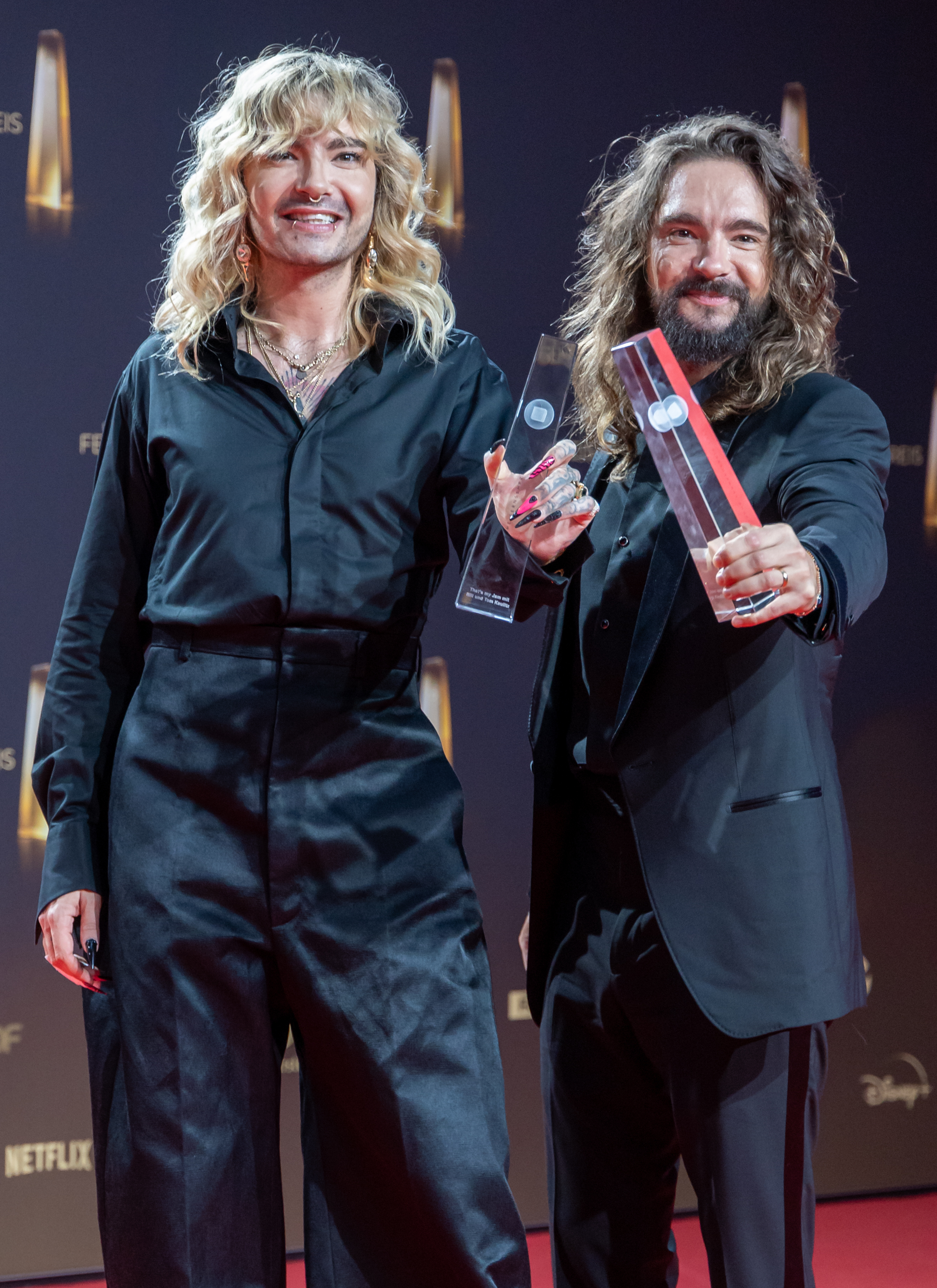
Bill & Tom Kaulitz (duo, 2023)

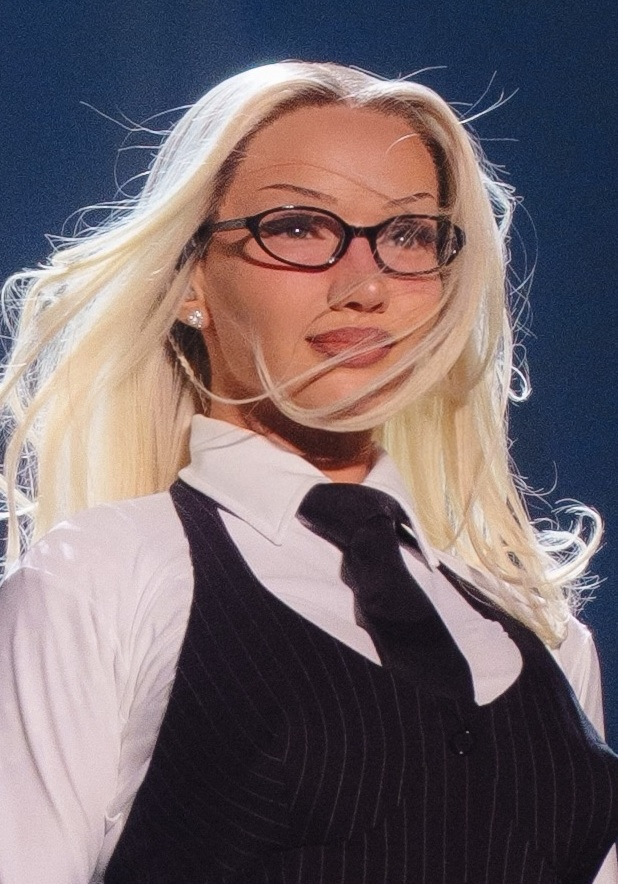
Shirin David (2023, 2025–)

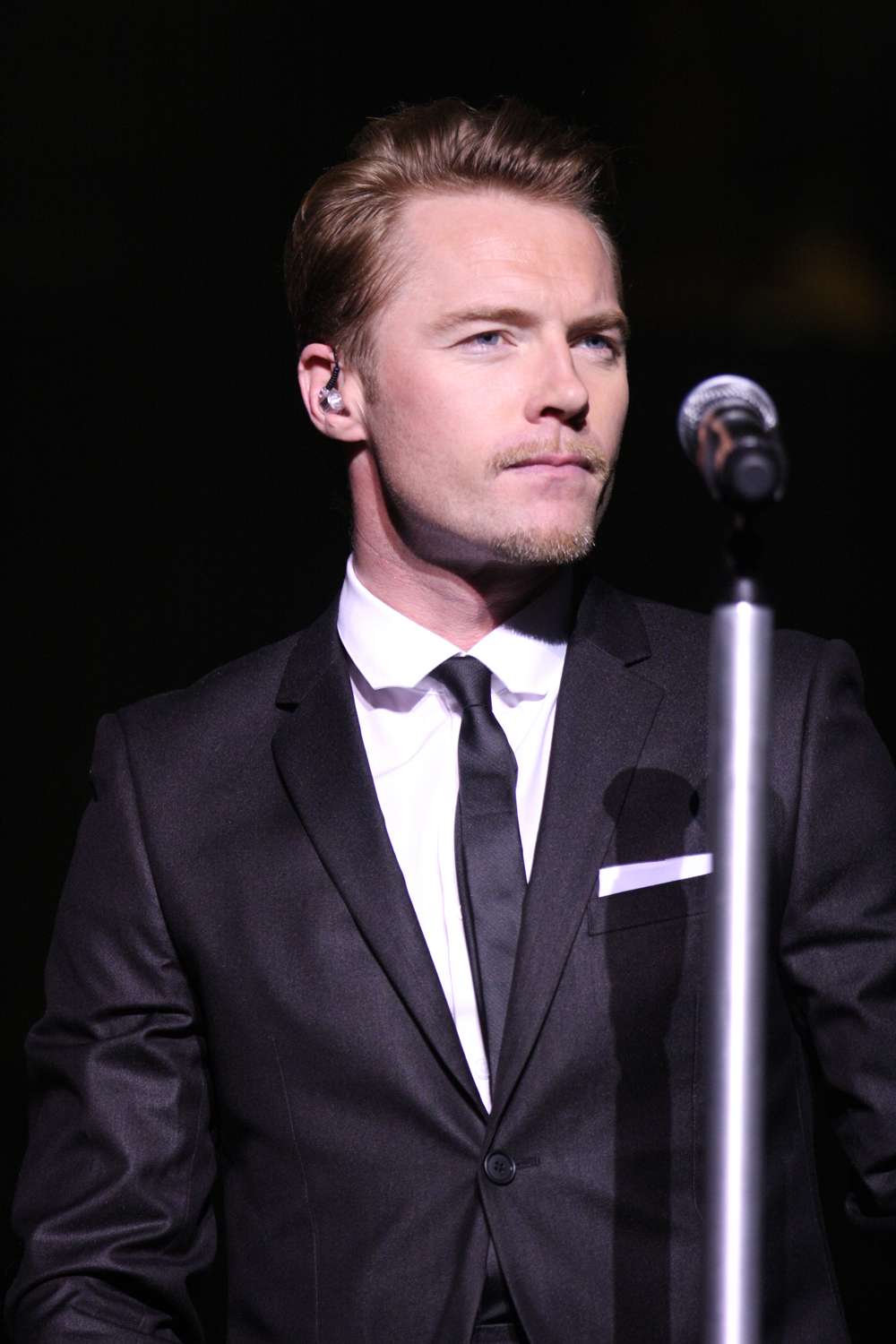
Ronan Keating (2023)

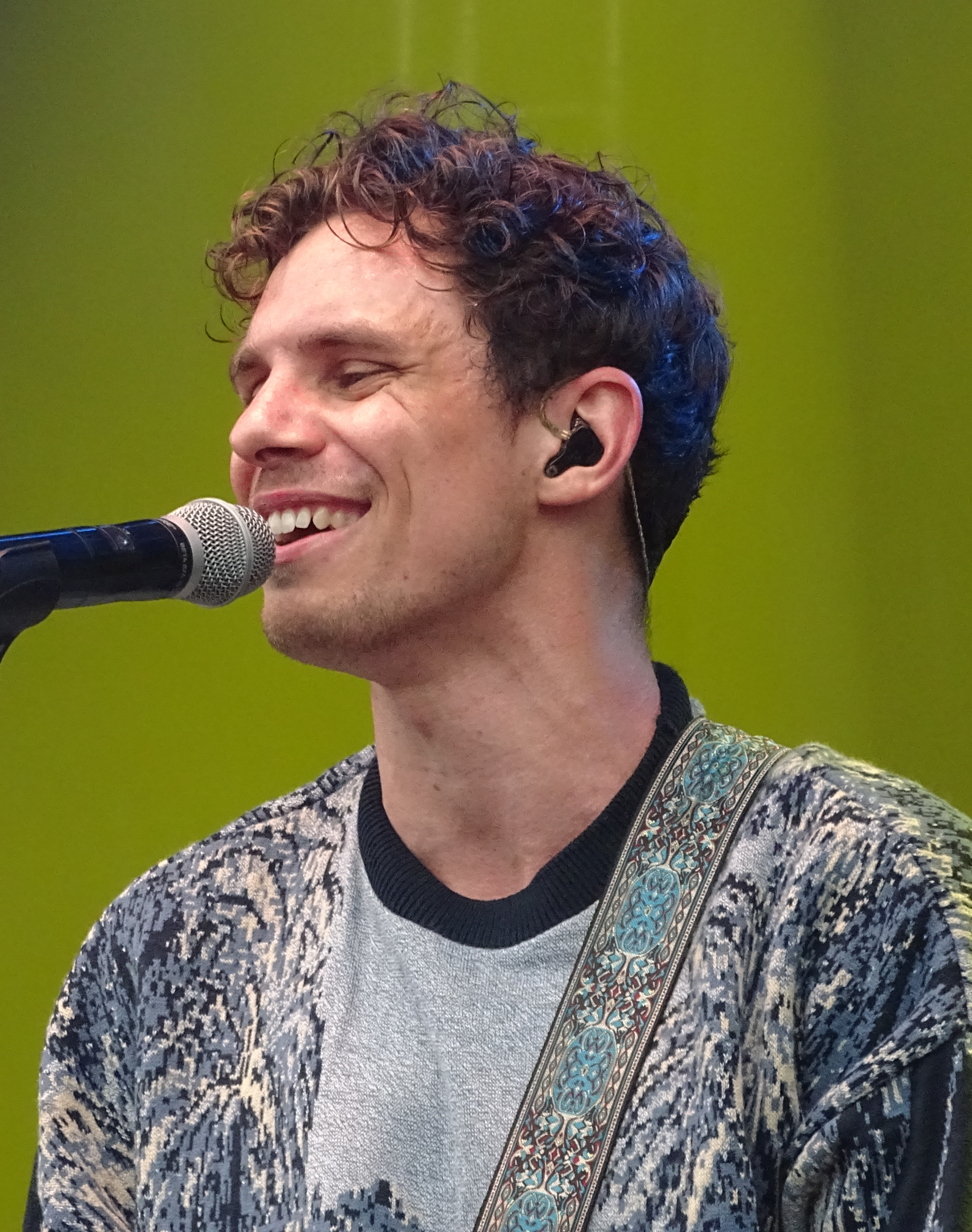
Kamrad (2024)

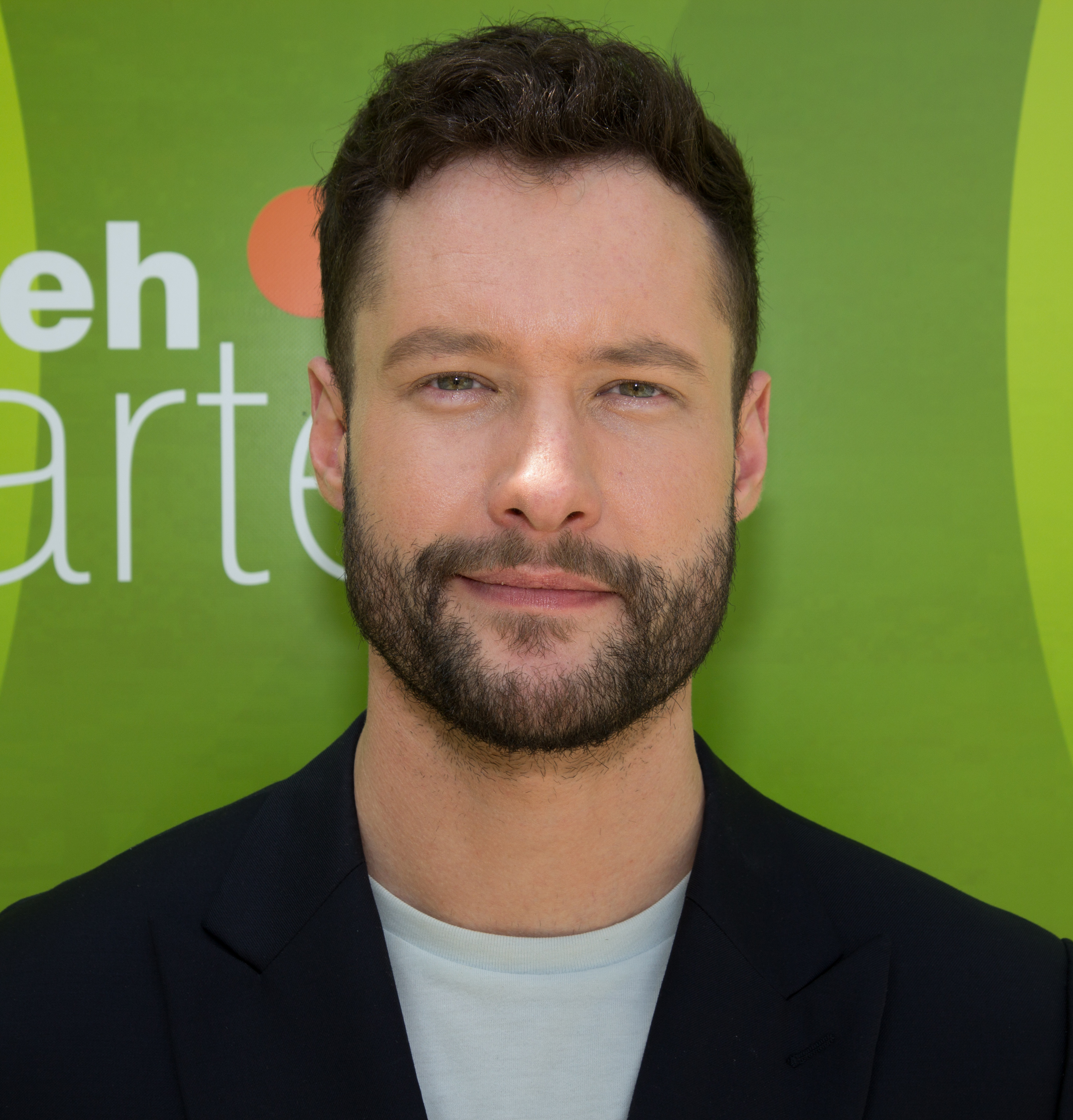
Calum Scott (Comeback Stage, 2025)

=== Lineup of coaches ===
Coaches' line-up by chairs order
Season	Year	Coaches			
Season	Year	1	2	3	4
1	2011	Rea	Nena	BossHoss	Xavier
2	2012	Rea	Nena	BossHoss	Xavier
3	2013	Samu	Nena	BossHoss	Max
4	2014	Rea	Michi Smudo	Stefanie	Samu
5	2015	Rea	Stefanie	Michi Smudo	Andreas
6	2016	Samu	Yvonne	Michi Smudo	Andreas
7	2017	Mark	Michi Smudo	Yvonne	Samu
8	2018	Michael Patrick	Michi Smudo	Yvonne	Mark
9	2019	Mark	Alice	Sido	Rea
10	2020	Mark	Yvonne Stefanie	Nico	Samu Rea
11	2021	Mark	Nico	Sarah	Johannes
12	2022	Rea	Stefanie	Peter	Mark
13	2023	Giovanni	Bill + Tom	Shirin	Ronan
14	2024	Mark	Yvonne	Kamrad	Samu
15	2025	Rea	Michi Smudo	Shirin	Nico
16	2026	Rea	Michi Smudo	Shirin	Nico

=== Presenters ===
Stefan Gödde was announced as the host of the program in July 2011. From season two to season fifteen, actor Thore Schölermann hosted the show. From the fifth season until the eleventh season, Schölermann and model Lena Gercke hosted the show together. From season 12 to season 15, Schölermann hosted the show with Melissa Khalaj.

From season one until season four, Doris Golpashin was as the show's social media correspondent during the live shows.

In the tenth season TV presenter Annemarie Carpendale hosted the show, only for the blind auditions, battle rounds and sing offs, replacing Gercke, who was pregnant. Gercke returned in the live shows. In the eleventh season, Schölermann could not be in the semi-final and final, because his wife Jana Schölermann was pregnant. Melissa Khalaj replaced him in the semi-final, and Steven Gätjen in the final. Schölermann departed the series after the fifteenth season and was replaced by Matthias Killing.

Color key
Featured as a full-time presenter.
Featured as a full-time backstage presenter.
Featured as a part-time presenter.

The Voice of Germany presenters
Presenter	Seasons															
Presenter	1	2	3	4	5	6	7	8	9	10	11	12	13	14	15	16
Stefan																
Doris																
Thore																
Lena																
Annemarie																
Melissa																
Steven																
Matthias																

Presenters gallery

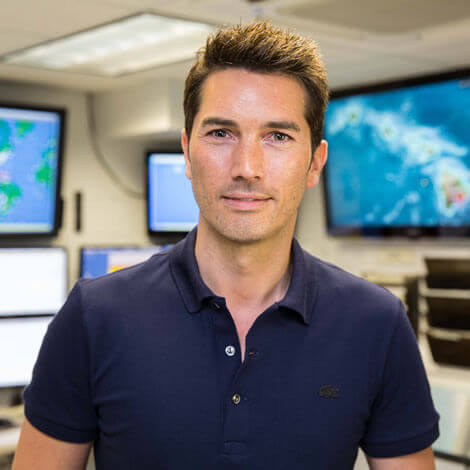
Stefan Gödde (2011)

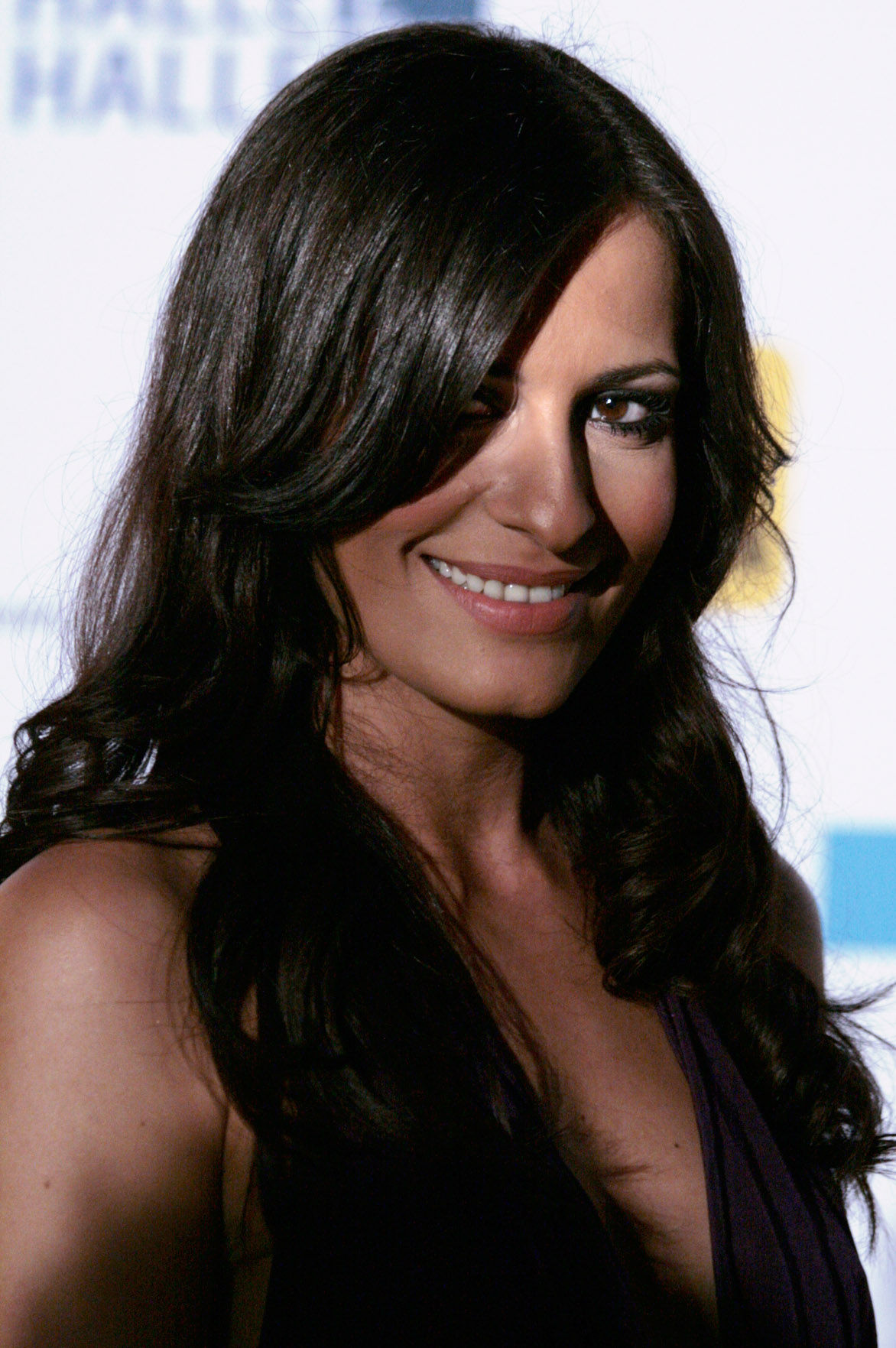
Doris Golpashin (Backstage, 2011–2014)

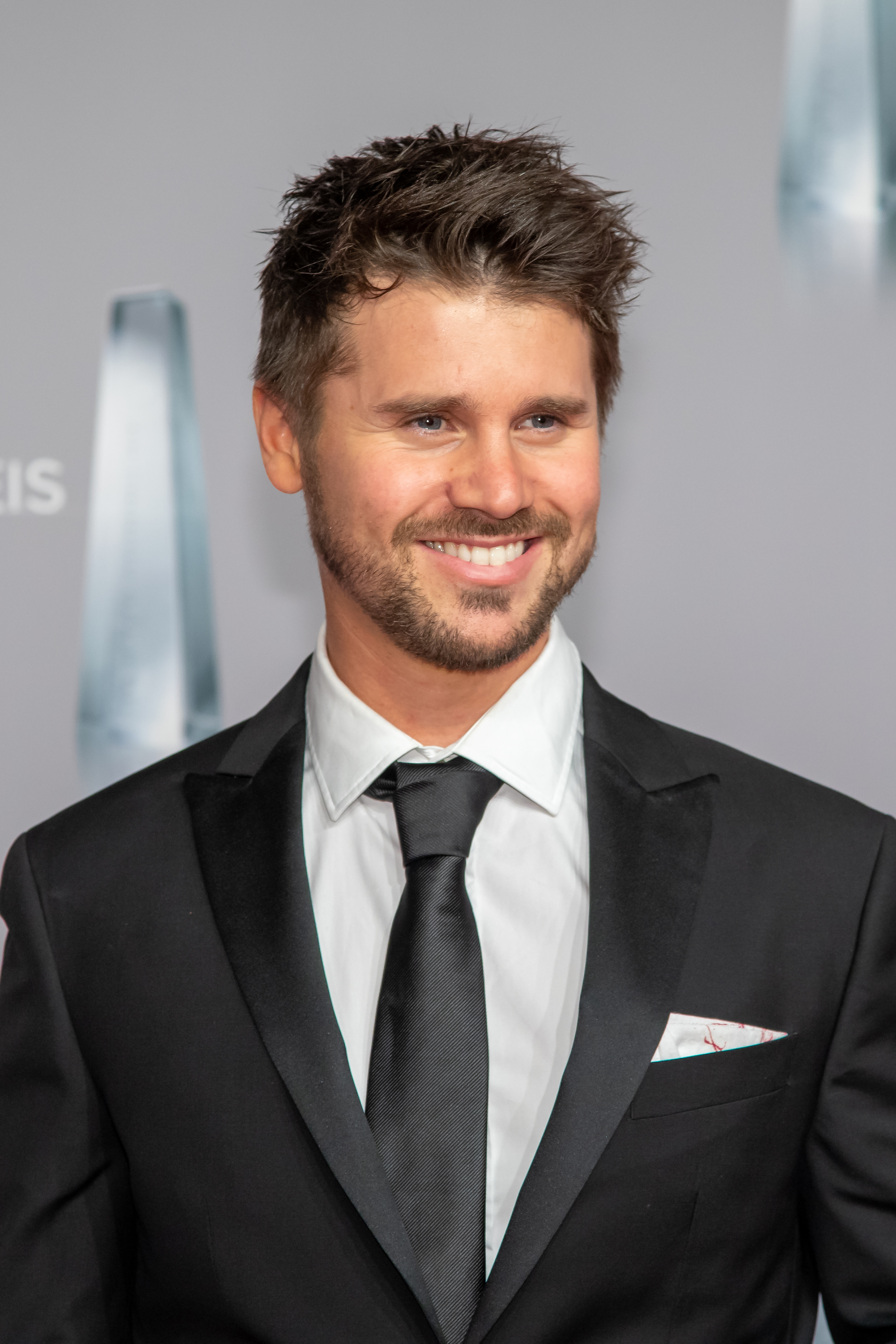
Thore Schölermann (2012–2025)

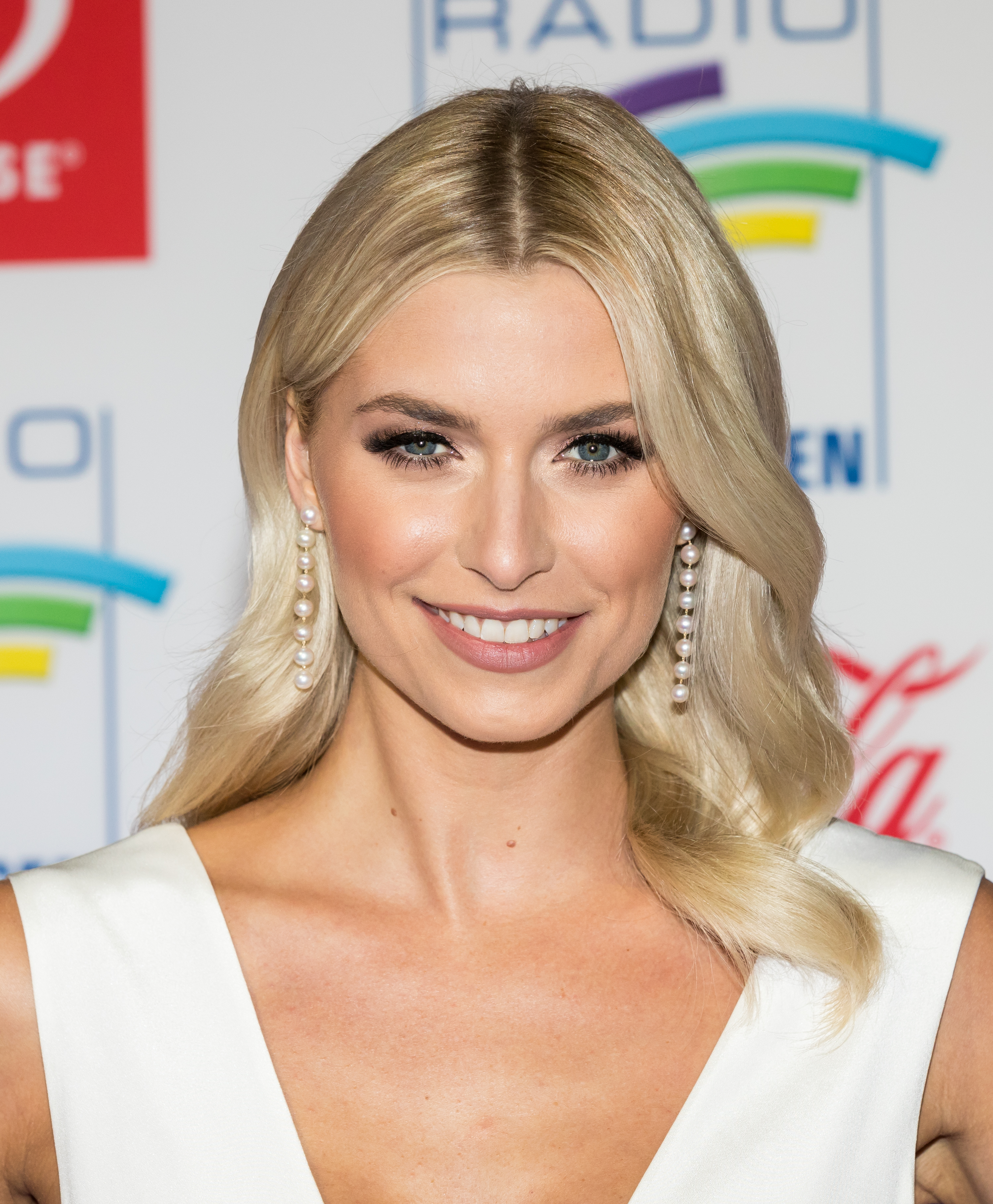
Lena Gercke (2015–2021)

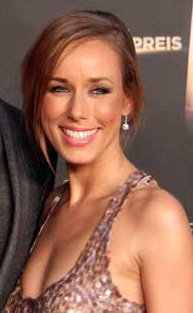
Annemarie Carpendale (2020)

Melissa Khalaj (2021–)

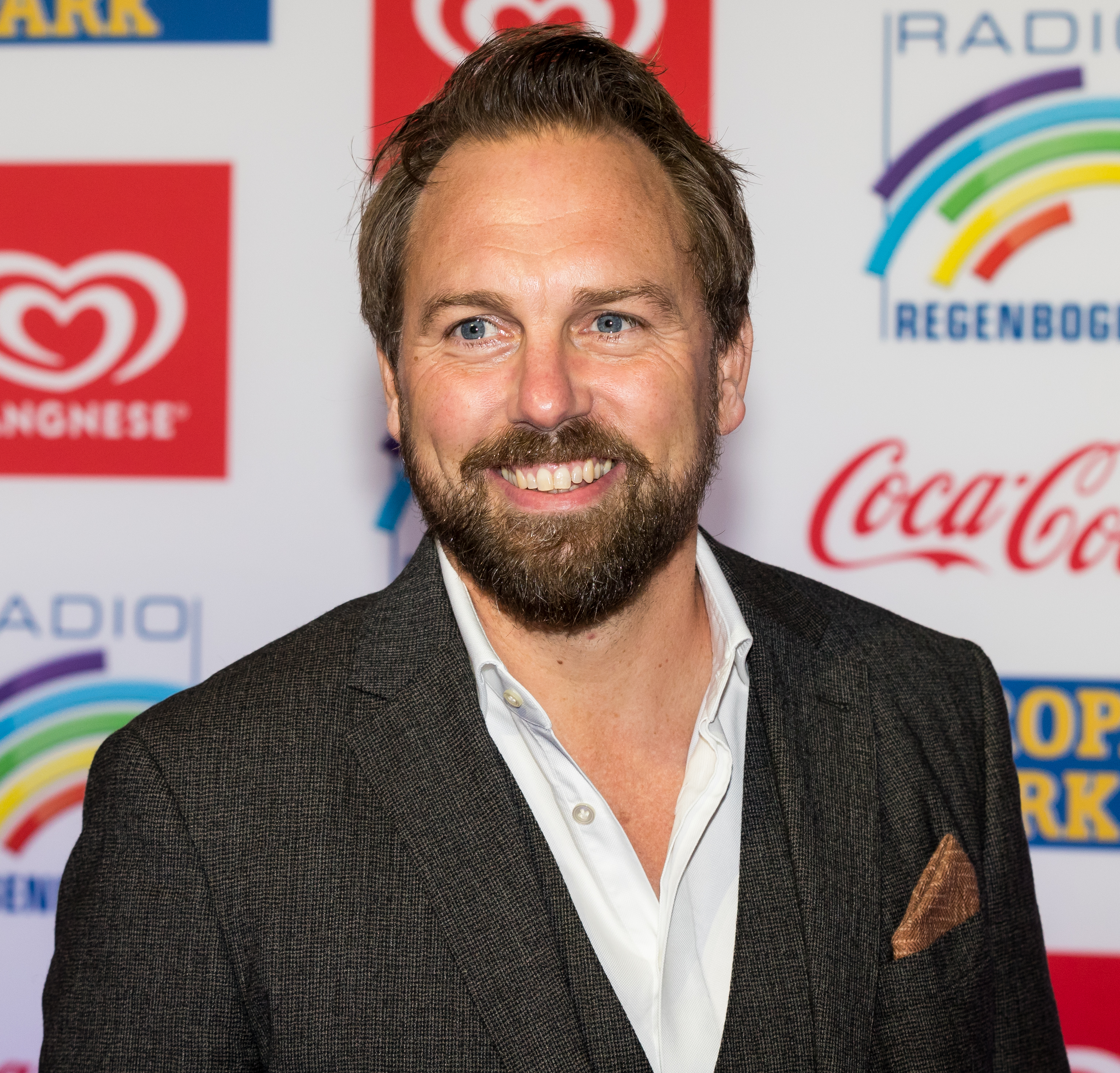
Steven Gätjen (2021)

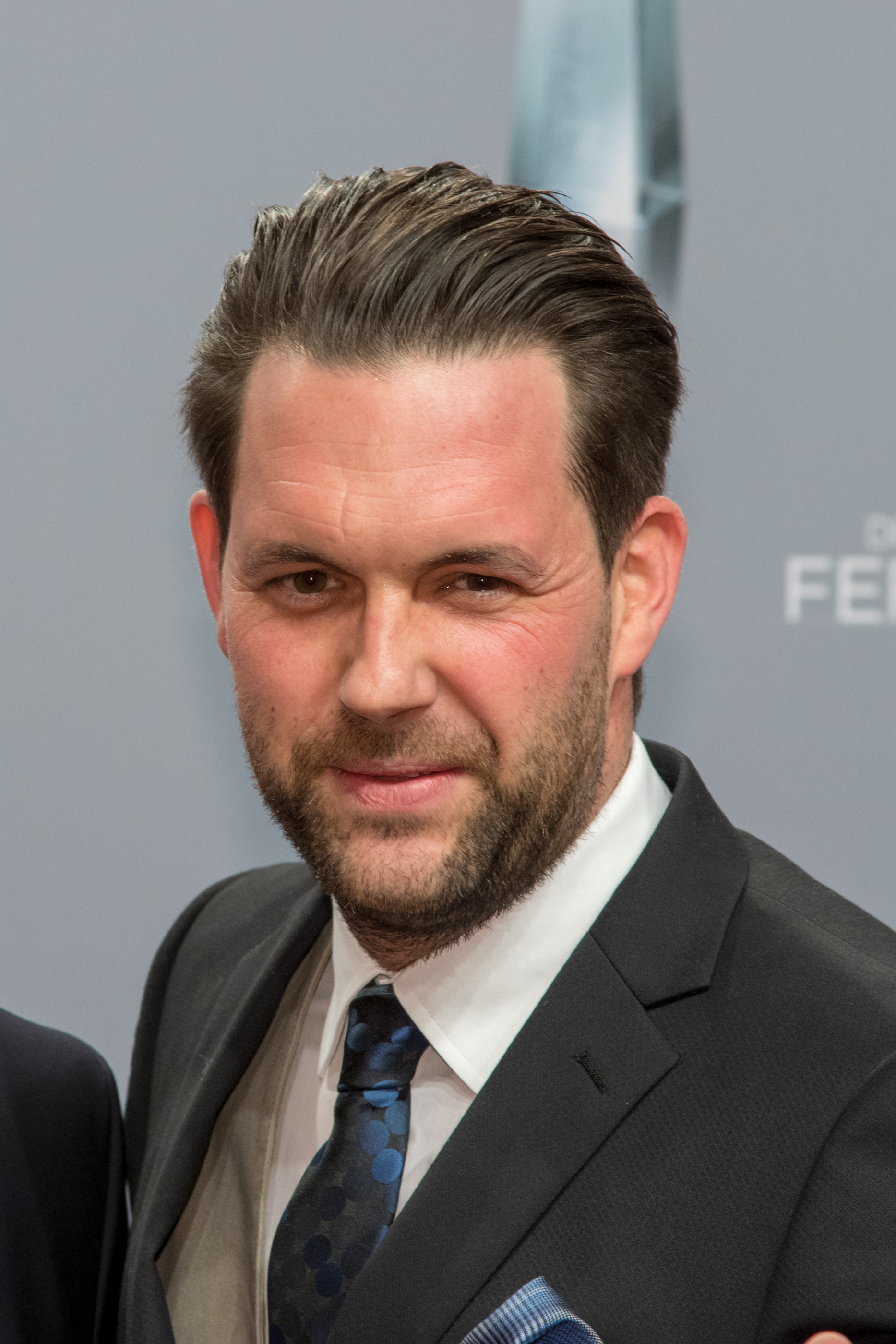
Matthias Killing (2026–)

== Coaches and finalists ==
Color key
Winner
Runner-up
Third place
Fourth place
Fifth place

- Warning: the following table presents a significant amount of different colors.
- Winners are in bold, the finalists in the finale are in italicized font, and the eliminated artists are in small font.

The Voice of Germany coaches and their finalists
Season	Rea Garvey	Nena	The BossHoss	Xavier Naidoo	—N/a
1	Michael Schulte; Jasmin Graf; Percival Duke; Benny Fiedler; Charles Simmons; Lena Sicks	Kim Sanders; Sharron Levy; Behnam Moghaddam; Yasmina Hunzinger; Nina Kutschera; Lisa Martine Weller	**Ivy Quainoo**; Ole Feddersen; Ramona Nerra; Bennie McMillan; C Jay; Sahar Haluzy	Max Giesinger; Mic Donet; Rino Galiano; Katja Friedenberg; Rüdiger Skoczowsky; Dominic Sanz	—N/a
2	**Nick Howard**; Michael Heinemann; Bianca Böhme; Jenna Hoff; Karo Fruhner; Evi Lancora; Rayland Horton; Michelle Perera	Isabell Schmidt; Brigitte Lorenz; Eva Croissant; Menna Mulugeta; Neo; Aisata Blackman; Sami & Samira Badawi; Michel Schmied	James Borges; Rob Fowler; Raffa Shira Banggard; Steffen Reusch; Keye Katcher; Lida Martel; Christin Kieu; Tiffany Kirkland	Michael Lane; Freaky T Gil Ofarim; Jesper Jürgens; Brandon Stone; Momo Djender; Iveta Mukuchyan; Marcel Gabriel	—N/a
3	Samu Haber	Nena	The BossHoss	Max Herre	—N/a
3	Chris Schummert; Judith van Hel; Yvonne Rüller; Romina Amann; Tesiree Priti; Nilima Chowdhury	Tiana Kruskic; Emily Intsiful; Thorunn Egilsdóttir; John Noville; Nader Rahy; Laura Kattan	Debbie Schippers; Caro Trischler; Tal Ofarim; Aalijah Tabatha Hahnemann; David Whitley; Anina Schibli	**Andreas Kümmert**; Peer Richter; Nico Gomez; Yasemin "Jazz" Akkar; Violeta Kokollari; Katharina Schoofs	—N/a
4	Rea Garvey	Michi Beck & Smudo	Stefanie Kloß	Samu Haber	—N/a
4	Lina Arndt; Philipp Leon Altmeyer; Alex Hartung; Carlos Jerez	**Charley Ann Schmutzler**; Calvin Bynum; Stephanie Kurpisch; René Lugonic	Marion Campbell; Ben Dettinger; Björn Amadeus Kahl; Anna Liza Risse	Andrei Vesa; René Noçon; Katrin Ringling; Daniel Mehrsadeh	—N/a
5	Rea Garvey	Stefanie Kloß	Michi Beck & Smudo	Andreas Bourani	—N/a
5	Denise Beiler; Mary Summer; Joshua Harfst	Isabel Ment; Dimi Rompos; Cheryl Vorsterman van Oijen	**Jamie-Lee Kriewitz**; Tobias Vorwerk; Matthias Nzola Zanquila	Ayke Witt; Tiffany Kemp; Michael Bauereiß	—N/a
6	Samu Haber	Yvonne Catterfeld	Michi Beck & Smudo	Andreas Bourani	—N/a
6	Robin Resch; Stas Schurins; Florian"Flo"Unger	Boris Alexander Stein; Vera Tavares; Friedemann Petter	Marc Amacher; Robert Ildefonso; Yasmin Sidibe	**Tay Schmedtmann**; Lucie Fischer; Michael Caliman	—N/a
7	Mark Forster	Michi Beck & Smudo	Yvonne Catterfeld	Samu Haber	—N/a
7	Benedikt Köstler; Michael Russ; Filiz Arslan	Anna Heimrath; Meike Hammerschmidt; Dzenan Buldic	BB Thomaz; Melvin Vardouniotis; Gregor Hägele	**Natia Todua**; Janina Beyerlein; Lara Samira Will	—N/a
8	Michael Patrick Kelly	Michi Beck & Smudo	Yvonne Catterfeld	Mark Forster	—N/a
8	**Samuel Rösch**; Bernarda Brunović; Matthias Nebel	Eros Atomus Isler; Coby Grant; Clifford Dwenger	Benjamin Dolic; Linda Alkhodor; James Smith Jr.	Jessica Schaffler; Rahel Maas; Diana Babalola	—N/a
9	Mark Forster	Alice Merton	Sido	Rea Garvey	Nico Santos
9	Fidi Steinbeck; Oxa	**Claudia Emmanuela Santoso**; Mariel Kirschall	Freschta Akbarzada; Larissa Pitzen	Erwin Kintop; Marita Hintz	Lucas Rieger; Celine Abeling
10	Mark Forster	Yvonne Catterfeld & Stefanie Kloß	Nico Santos	Samu Haber & Rea Garvey	Michael Schulte
10	Tosari Udayana; Sion Jung	Oliver Henrich; Juan Geck	Jonas & Mael; Nico Traut	**Paula Dalla Corte**; Matthias Nebel	Alessandro Pola; Mickela Löffel
11	Mark Forster	Nico Santos	Sarah Connor	Johannes Oerding	Elif Demirezer
11	Florian & Charlene; The Razzzones; Luna Farina	Gugu Zulu; Kati Lamberts; Jennifer Williams	Katarina Mihaljević; Archippe Ombang; Joel Zupan	**Sebastian Krenz**; Ann Sophie; Zeynep Avci	Linda Elsener; Sascha Salvati
12	Rea Garvey	Stefanie Kloß	Peter Maffay	Mark Forster	—N/a
12	Tammo Förster; Jan Bleeker; Sophie Frei	Basti Schmidt; Lizi Gogua; Luan Huber	Julian Pförtner; Nel Lewicki; Susan Agbor	**Anny Ogrezeanu**; Bruno Flütsch; Marlon Falter	—N/a
13	Giovanni Zarrella	Bill & Tom Kaulitz	Shirin David	Ronan Keating	Kool Savas
13	Desirey Sarpong Agyemang	**Malou Lovis Kreyelkamp**; Joel Marques Cunha; Marc Altergott; Naomi Mbiyeya; Niclas Scholz	Joy Esquivias; Kim Schutzius; Danilo Timm; Finja Bernau	Egon Herrnleben; Emely Myles	Leon "Ezo" Weick
14	Mark Forster	Yvonne Catterfeld	Kamrad	Samu Haber	—N/a
14	Jenny Hohlbauch; Kathrin German	Sebastian Zappel; Gian Carlos Navea; Gabriela Kyeremateng; Kadischa Weiß	Ingrid Arthur; Nico Klemm	**Jennifer Lynn**; Emily König; Iman Rashay; Loulia Esteves	—N/a
15	Rea Garvey	Michi Beck & Smudo	Shirin David	Nico Santos	Calum Scott
15	Max Pesé	Bernarda Brunović; Lisa Asante; Karl Frierson II; Clifford Dwenger	Oxa; Vasco José Mano; Ereza	**Anne Mosters**; Greta Heimann; Marvin Tapper; Louk Jones	Joelisa Serwah André; Vincent Rinne
16	Maja Atzmüller; Lisa Aithnard	Mel Vadouniotis	Aylin Basar	Janis Eric Thommen; Marika; Lara Trautmann; Joel	—N/a

== Coaches' advisors ==
From the first season until the fourth the coaches' advisors was in the Battle rounds and from season six until season twelve were in the Sing Offs.

The Voice of Germany coaches advisors
Season	Team Rea	Team Nena	Team BossHoss	Team Xavier
1	Nerina Pallot	Derek von Krogh	Jan Löchel	Michael Herberger
2	Andy Chatterley	Derek von Krogh	Jan Löchel	Michael Herberger
3	Team Samu	Team Nena	Team BossHoss	Team Max
3	Brix	Derek von Krogh; John Andrews	Jan Löchel	Sékou
4	Team Rea	Team Michi & Smudo	Team Stefanie	Team Samu
4	Andy Chatterley	Thomilla	Alexander Freund	Brix
5	Team Rea	Team Stefanie	Team Michi & Smudo	Team Andreas
5	—N/a			
6	Team Samu	Team Yvonne	Team Michi & Smudo	Team Andreas
6	Shawn Mendes	Alicia Keys	Robbie Williams	Emeli Sandé
7	Team Mark	Team Yvonne	Team Michi & Smudo	Team Samu
7	Rita Ora	Demi Lovato	Beth Ditto	Jason Derulo
8	Team Michael Patrick	Team Michi & Smudo	Team Yvonne	Team Mark
8	Olly Murs	Jess Glynne	Josh Groban	Dua Lipa
9	Team Mark	Team Alice	Team Sido	Team Rea
9	Natasha Bedingfield	Ryan Tedder	James Blunt	Michael Schulte
10	Team Mark	Team Yvonne & Stefanie	Team Nico	Team Samu & Rea
10	Joy Denalane	Clueso	Lea	David Guetta
11	Team Mark	Team Nico	Team Sarah	Team Johannes
11	—N/a			
12	Team Rea	Team Stefanie	Team Peter	Team Mark
12	Tones and I	Lena Meyer-Landrut	Wincent Weiss	Calum Scott
13	Team Giovanni	Team Bill & Tom	Team Shirin	Team Ronan
13	—N/a			
14	Team Mark	Team Yvonne	Team Kamrad	Team Samu
14	—N/a			
15	Team Rea	Team Michi & Smudo	Team Shirin	Team Nico
15	—N/a			
16
16	—N/a			

== Series overview ==
Warning: the following table presents a significant amount of different colors.

Teams color key
Team BossHoss	Team Mark	Team Elif
Team Nena	Team Michael Patrick	Team Peter
Team Rea	Team Alice	Team Giovanni
Team Xavier	Team Sido	Team Bill & Tom
Team Max	Team Nico	Team Shirin
Team Samu	Team Samu & Rea	Team Ronan
Team Stefanie	Team Yvonne & Stefanie	Team Kamrad
Team Michi & Smudo	Team Michael
Team Andreas	Team Johannes
Team Yvonne	Team Sarah

The Voice series overview
Season	Aired in	Winner	Runner-up	Third place	Fourth place	Fifth place	Sixth place	Seventh place	Winning coach	Host(s)
1	2011	Ivy Quainoo	Kim Sanders	Michael Schulte	Max Giesinger	—N/a	—N/a	—N/a	The BossHoss	Stefan Gödde
2	2012	Nick Howard	Isabell Schmidt	Michael Lane	James Borges	—N/a	—N/a	—N/a	Rea Garvey	Thore Schölermann
3	2013	Andreas Kümmert	Chris Schummert	Judith van Hel	Debbie Schippers	—N/a	—N/a	—N/a	Max Herre	Thore Schölermann
4	2014	Charley Ann Schmutzler	Lina Arndt	Andrei Vesa	Marion Campbell	—N/a	—N/a	—N/a	Michi & Smudo	Thore Schölermann
5	2015	Jamie-Lee Kriewitz	Ayke Witt	Tiffany Kemp	Isabel Ment	—N/a	—N/a	—N/a	Michi & Smudo	Schölermann, Lena Gercke
6	2016	Tay Schmedtmann	Robin Resch	Marc Amacher	Boris A. Stein	—N/a	—N/a	—N/a	Andreas Bourani	Schölermann, Lena Gercke
7	2017	Natia Todua	Benedikt Köstler	Anna Heimrath	BB Thomaz	—N/a	—N/a	—N/a	Samu Haber	Schölermann, Lena Gercke
8	2018	Samuel Rösch	Benjamin Dolic	Jessica Schaffler	Eros A. Isler	—N/a	—N/a	—N/a	Michael Patrick Kelly	Schölermann, Lena Gercke
9	2019	Claudia E. Santoso	Erwin Kintop	Lucas Rieger	Fidi Steinbeck	Freschta Akbarzada	—N/a	—N/a	Alice Merton	Schölermann, Lena Gercke
10	2020	Paula Dalla Corte	Oliver Henrich	Jonas & Mael	Alessandro Pola	Tosari Udayana	—N/a	—N/a	Samu & Rea	Schölermann, Lena Gercke
11	2021	Sebastian Krenz	Gugu Zulu	Katarina Mihaljević	Linda Elsener	Florian & Charlene	—N/a	—N/a	Johannes Oerding	Schölermann, Lena Gercke
12	2022	Anny Ogrezeanu	Julian Pförtner	Tammo Förster	Basti Schmidt	—N/a	—N/a	—N/a	Mark Forster	Schölermann, Melissa Khalaj
13	2023	Malou Lovis Kreyelkamp	Desirey S. Agyemang	Egon Herrnleben	Joy Esquivias	Emely Myles	—N/a	—N/a	Bill & Tom Kaulitz	Schölermann, Melissa Khalaj
14	2024	Jennifer Lynn	Jenny Hohlbauch	Sebastian Zappel	Emily König	Kathrin German	Ingrid Arthur	—N/a	Samu Haber	Schölermann, Melissa Khalaj
15	2025	Anne Mosters	Max Pesé	Greta Heimann	Bernarda Brunović	Oxa	Vasco José Mano	Marvin Tapper	Nico Santos	Schölermann, Melissa Khalaj
16	2026	Current season								Khalaj, Matthias Killing

=== Season 1 (2011–2012) ===
The first season of the show was aired from 24 November 2011 to 10 February 2012. The first season was moderated by Stefan Gödde and backstage by Doris Golpashin. The coaches were pop musician Nena, soul singer Xavier Naidoo, singer and guitarist Rea Garvey, and duo Alec Völkel and Sascha Vollmer from the band The BossHoss. The winner was Ivy Quainoo from Team BossHoss.

Ivy Quainoo debuted at No. 2 on the German Media Control charts with her debut single "Do You Like What You See", while the other three finalists also made it into the top 20.

=== Season 2 (2012) ===
The second season of The Voice of Germany aired from 18 October to 14 December 2012. The second season was moderated by Thore Schölermann. The four coaches and the backstage presenter remained the same as in season one. The winner of the second season was Nick Howard from Team Rea with his song "Unbreakable".

=== Season 3 (2013) ===
The third season of The Voice of Germany was aired from 17 October to 20 December 2013. In addition to the previous coaches Nena and the duo from The BossHoss, the coaches included rapper and music producer Max Herre and songwriter, singer and guitarist Samu Haber. The third season was moderated again by Thore Schölermann and backstage by Doris Golpashin. The winner was Andreas Kümmert from Team Max with his song "Simple Man".

=== Season 4 (2014) ===
The fourth season was aired from 9 October to 12 December 2014. Samu Haber returned as coach and with Rea Garvey, who was also in the first two seasons a coach, Stefanie Kloß and Michi Beck & Smudo. This season was again hosted by Thore Schölermann and the backstage presenter was Doris Golpashin. The winner of the fourth season was Charley Ann Schmutzler from Team Michi & Smudo with her song "Blue Heart".

=== Season 5 (2015) ===
The fifth season was aired from 15 October to 17 December 2015. Rea Garvey, Stefanie Kloß, and Michi & Smudo returned as coaches and with Andreas Bourani as the new coach. This season had two main presenters Thore Schölermann and Lena Gercke. The winner of the fifth season was Jamie-Lee Kriewitz from Team Michi & Smudo with her song "Ghost", which was also the German contribution to the Eurovision Song Contest 2016 a few months later. There Kriewitz reached the last place with 11 points.

=== Season 6 (2016) ===
The sixth season began airing on 20 October and ended on 18 December 2016. From the previous season, Michi & Smudo, and Andreas Bourani returned as coaches. Samu Haber and Yvonne Catterfeld replaced Rea Garvey and Stefanie Kloß. Thore Schölermann and Lena Gercke both returned as the hosts. On 15 September 2016, it was announced that the show would be broadcast on ProSieben on Thursdays and on Sat.1 on Sundays. The winner of the sixth season was Tay Schmedtmann from Team Andreas.

=== Season 7 (2017) ===
The seventh season started on 19 October and ended on 17 December 2017. Yvonne Catterfeld, Samu Haber as well as Michi & Smudo returned as coaches. Andreas Bourani was replaced by Mark Forster. Also hosts Thore Schölermann and Lena Gercke remained on the show. The winner was Natia Todua from Team Samu. None of the finalists sang their original song this year.

=== Season 8 (2018) ===
The eighth season of the show was aired from 18 October to 16 December 2018. Yvonne Catterfeld, Mark Forster, and Michi & Smudo were joined by Michael Patrick Kelly, who replaced Samu Haber. Host Lena Gercke and Thore Schölermann remained. The Winner was Samuel Rösch from Team Michael Patrick Kelly.

=== Season 9 (2019) ===
The ninth season began on 12 September and ended on 10 November 2019. Returning coach Mark Forster, was joined by Rea Garvey, who returned after a 3-year hiatus, and new coaches Alice Merton and Sido. For the first time in the show's history, the season featured a fifth coach, Nico Santos, who selected contestants who did not turn a chair in the Blind Auditions or was eliminated from later rounds of the competition, to participate in Comeback Stage by SEAT. Thore Schölermann and Lena Gercke remained as the presenters. The winner was Claudia Emmanuela Santoso from Team Alice.

=== Season 10 (2020) ===
The ten-year anniversary season began airing on 8 October 2020. Mark Forster returned as a coach, while Yvonne Catterfeld & Stefanie Kloß returned to the show, this time as a duo. Samu Haber & Rea Garvey also coached as a duo. Nico Santos moved from the online-coach to a full-time coach. Finally, Michael Schulte joined the show as the online-coach, replacing Santos. Thore Schölermann and Lena Gercke continued hosting. Gercke this season hosted only the live shows, due to pregnancy. In the other stages of the show, Schölermann was joined by Annemarie Carpendale. The winner was Paula Dalla Corte from Team Samu & Rea.

=== Season 11 (2021) ===
The eleventh season began airing on 7 October 2021 and concluded on 19 December 2021. Mark Forster and Nico Santos returned as coaches and were joined by new coaches Johannes Oerding and Sarah Connor. Elif Demirezer was the fifth coach, who selected contestants who were eliminated from the competition, to participate in the Comeback Stage by SEAT. Thore Schölermann and Lena Gercke returned as the presenters. The winner was Sebastian Krenz from Team Johannes.

=== Season 12 (2022) ===
The twelfth season began airing on 18 August 2022 and concluded on 4 November 2022. On 12 May 2022, it was announced that Rea Garvey, Mark Forster, & Stefanie Kloß would all return for their seventh, sixth, and fourth season, respectively. They were joined by a new coach, Peter Maffay. The winner was Anny Ogrezeanu from Team Mark.

=== Season 13 (2023) ===
The thirteenth season began airing on 21 September 2023. On 6 June 2023, it was announced that Giovanni Zarrella, Bill & Tom Kaulitz, Shirin David, and former The Voice Australia and The Voice Kids UK coach Ronan Keating would all debut as coaches this season. The block, first introduced in the fourteenth season of the American version of the show, was also introduced as a twist for the blind auditions, giving coaches the power to block another coach from getting an artist. The winner was Malou Lovis Kreyelkamp from Team Bill & Tom.

=== Season 14 (2024) ===
The fourteenth season began airing on 26 September 2024. On 18 May 2024, it was announced that Samu Haber and Yvonne Catterfeld would return as coaches after a three-season absence, as well as Mark Forster, who returns after a one-season absence. The three returning coaches were joined by Kamrad who made his debut as a coach. The winner was Jennifer Lynn from Team Samu.

=== Season 15 (2025) ===
The fifteenth season began airing on 25 September 2025. On 20 April 2025, it was announced that the panel would consist of returning coaches Shirin David, Rea Garvey, Nico Santos, and Michi & Smudo, who returned after one, two, three, and six-season hiatuses, respectively. Calum Scott is featured as the fifth coach, who selected contestants who were eliminated from the competition, to participate in the Comeback Stage by SEAT. The winner was Anne Mosters from Team Nico.

=== Season 16 (2026) ===
The sixteenth season began airing on 11 September 2026. On 27 April 2026, it was announced that Rea Garvey, Michi & Smudo, Shirin David, and Nico Santos would all return as coaches for the sixteenth season. This marks the first time a coaching panel has remained the same for two consecutive seasons since the second season. Additionally, host Thore Schölermann departed the show after fourteen seasons and Matthias Killing debuted as the main host, joining Melissa Khalaj.

== The Voice Rap ==
On 2 May 2023, the rap version of the show called The Voice Rap was announced and began airing 14 September 2023. Rappers Kool Savas and Dardan are the coaches on the new spin-off. The Voice Rap is the only version of The Voice franchise to feature only 2 coaches.

=== Coaches and finalists ===
Color key
Winner
Runner-up

- Winners are in bold, the finalists in the finale are in italicized font, and the eliminated artists are in small font.

The Voice Rap coaches and their finalists
Season	Dardan	Kool Savas
1	Dominik "CEO" Andrews Krämer; Erda Havolli	**Leon "Ezo" Weick**; Selina "Caddy" Pack

=== Series overview ===
Color key
Artist from Team Dardan
Artist from Team Kool Savas

The Voice Rap series overview
Season	Aired	Winner	Runner-up	Winning coach	Host	Coaches & Chair Order	
Season	Aired	Winner	Runner-up	Winning coach	Host	1	2
1	2023	Leon "Ezo" Weick	Dominik "CEO" Andrews Krämer	Kool Savas	Thore Schölermann	Dardan	Kool Savas

=== Coaches' timeline ===
Coach	Seasons
Coach	1
Dardan	
Kool Savas	

Coaches gallery

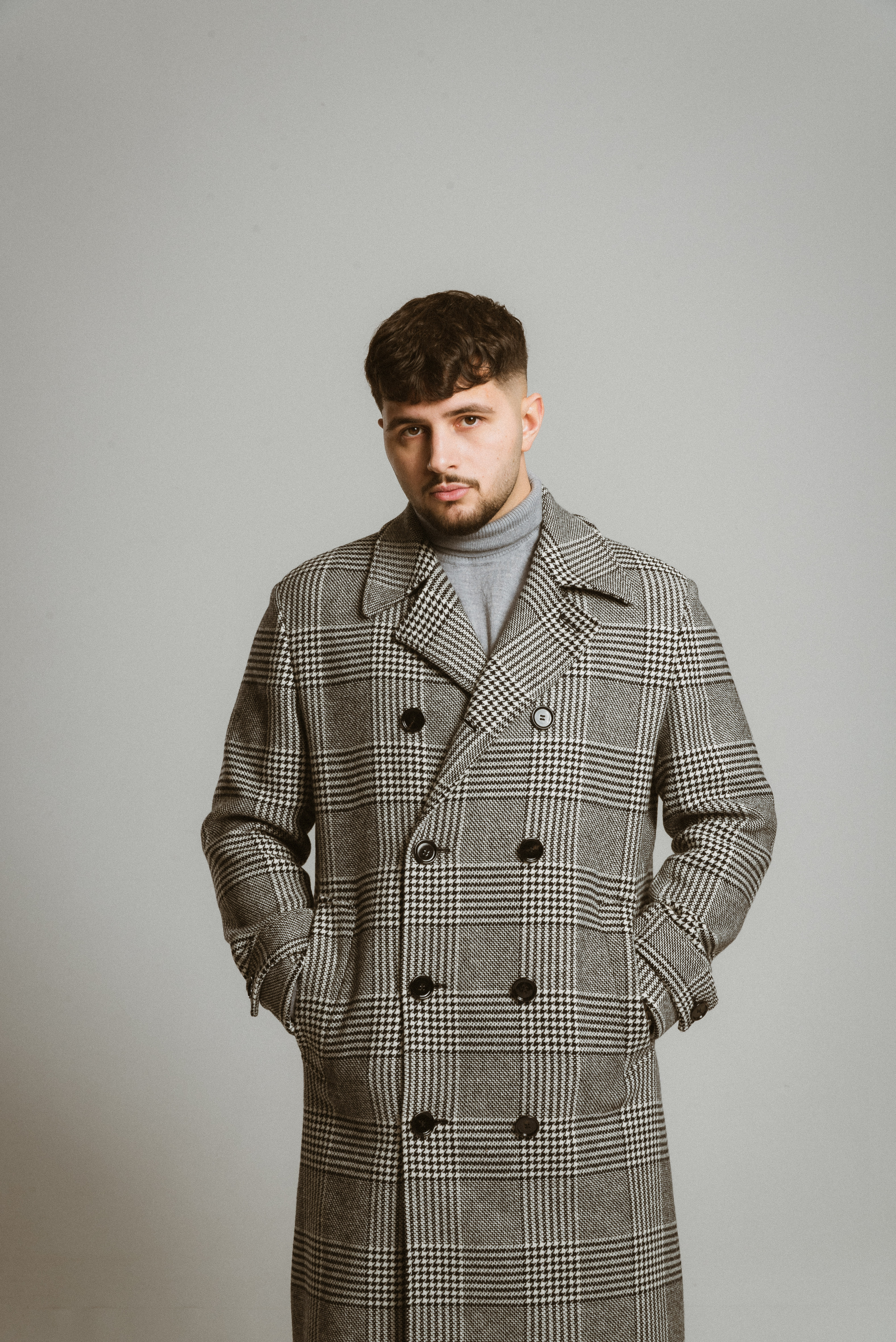
Dardan (2023)

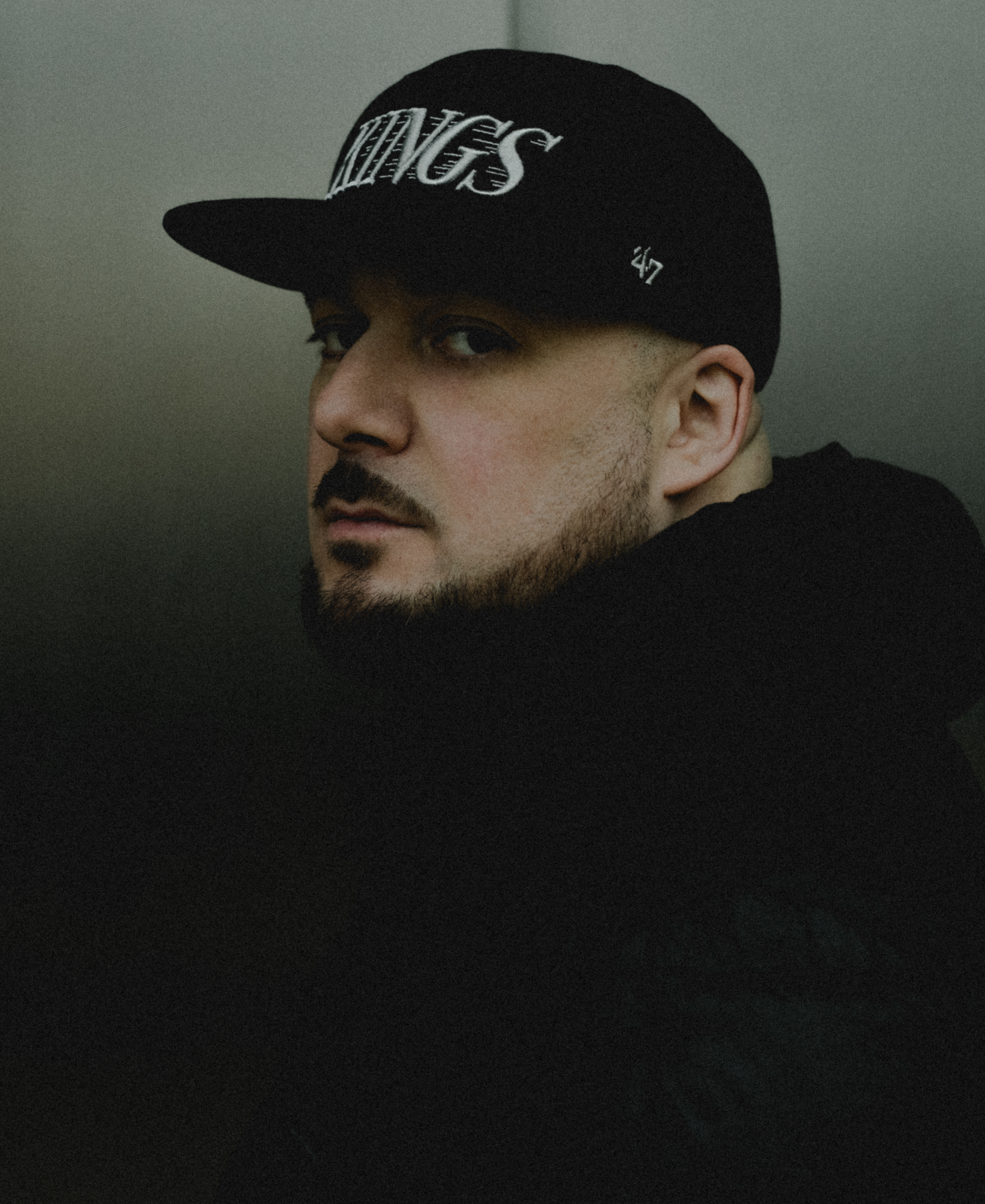
Kool Savas (2023)

== Reception ==
=== Critical reception ===
In the media, the casting show met some critical voices. In the selection of candidates is prefiltered, so that conspicuously many candidates look attractive or bring along moving stories.

The contracts of the participants were also criticized. During the production of the TV show, the candidates are usually prescribed which songs they are to sing. Even after the end of the show, they are bound to the Universal Music Group. The financial terms up to and including the third album by the TV show were not negotiable.

=== Ratings ===
The Voice of Germany ratings
Season	Time slot	Episodes	Premiered		Ended		TV season	Average viewers (millions)
Season	Time slot	Episodes	Date	Viewers (millions)	Date	Viewers (millions)	TV season	Average viewers (millions)
One	Thursdays 8:15 pm Fridays 8:15 pm	17	24 November 2011	3.89	10 February 2012	4.01	2011–2012	4.16
Two	Thursdays 8:15 pm Fridays 8:15 pm	16	18 October 2012	4.69	14 December 2012	3.42	2012–2013	4.02
Three	Thursdays 8:15 pm Fridays 8:15 pm	17	17 October 2013	4.03	20 December 2013	3.60	2013–2014	3.67
Four	Thursdays 8:15 pm Fridays 8:15 pm	17	9 October 2014	3.84	12 December 2014	3.15	2014–2015	3.52
Five	Thursdays 8:15 pm Fridays 8:15 pm	17	15 October 2015	3.81	17 December 2015	2.92	2015–2016	3.27
Six	Thursdays 8:15 pm Sundays 8:15 pm	17	20 October 2016	4.10	18 December 2016	3.08	2016–2017	3.58
Seven	Thursdays 8:15 pm Sundays 8:15 pm	17	19 October 2017	3.77	17 December 2017	3.31	2017–2018	3.70
Eight	Thursdays 8:15 pm Sundays 8:15 pm	17	18 October 2018	3.23	16 December 2018	2.54	2018–2019	2.94
Nine	Thursdays 8:15 pm Sundays 8:15 pm	17	12 September 2019	3.21	10 November 2019	2.58	2019–2020	2.76
Ten	Thursdays 8:15 pm Sundays 8:15 pm	19	8 October 2020	3.19	20 December 2020	2.50	2020–2021	2.67
Eleven	Thursdays 8:15 pm Sundays 8:15 pm	19	7 October 2021	2.14	19 December 2021	1.70	2021–2022	1.91
Twelve	Thursdays 8:15 pm Fridays 8:15 pm	19	18 August 2022	2.18	4 November 2022	1.80	2022–2023	1.86
Thirteen	Thursdays 8:15 pm Fridays 8:15 pm	19	21 September 2023	1.59	8 December 2023	1.63	2023–2024	1.51
Fourteen	Thursdays 8:15 pm Fridays 8:15 pm	17	26 September 2024	1.34	6 December 2024		2024–2025	
Fifteen	Thursdays 8:15 pm Fridays 8:15 pm	17	25 September 2025		12 December 2025		2025–2026	
Sixteen	Fridays 8:15 pm Saturdays 8:15 pm		11 September 2026		11 December 2026		2026–2027	

== Awards and nominations ==
Awards and nominations received by The Voice of Germany
Year	Award	Category	Result
2012	Goldene Kamera	Best Reality Television Series	Won
2012	Deutscher Fernsehpreis	Best Entertainment Show	Won
2012	Kress-Award	TV Program	Won
2015	Live-Entertainment-Award (LEA Award)	Artist / Young Talent of the Year 2014	Nominated
2016	Deutscher Fernsehpreis	Best entertainment primetime	Nominated
2016	Internationale Eyes & Ears Awards	Best interaction campaign	Nominated
2016	Internationale Eyes & Ears Awards	Best On-Air Program Spot: Show & Entertainment	Won
2016	Internationale Eyes & Ears Awards	Best cross-media event campaign	Nominated
2017	Bavarian TV Awards	Best Entertainment Show	Won
2017	Internationale Eyes & Ears Awards	Best special advertising form	Nominated
2018	Deutscher Fernsehpreis	Best Entertainment Show	Won
2018	Internationale Eyes & Ears Awards	Best use of music	Nominated
2021	2021 Kids' Choice Awards	Favorite Team (Germany, Austria & Switzerland)	Won
