= Bernarda Brunović =

Swiss-Croatian singer-songwriter

- Also known as: Bernarda Bruno, Bernarda
- Born: 11 November 1993 (age 32); Dietikon, Switzerland
- Origin: Zagreb, Croatia
- Genres: Pop
- Occupation: Singer-songwriter
- Years active: 2011–present
- Label: Scardona

Bernarda Brunović (born 11 November 1993), known mononymously as Bernarda and previously by the stage name Bernarda Bruno, is a Swiss-Croatian singer and songwriter.

== Career ==
In late 2010, Brunović was announced as one of the Schweizer Fernsehen (SF) candidates for Die grosse Entscheidungs Show, the Swiss national final for the Eurovision Song Contest 2011, with the song "Confidence", having made the top seven of the broadcaster's online vote. On 11 December 2010, she performed during the selection final and placed second, having received 13.36% of the votes.

Throughout 2014 and 2017, Brunović released three singles for the Croatian market, "Olujna noć", "Gdje da nađem mir" and "Ti i ja", respectively. In 2018, she took part in the eighth season of The Voice of Germany, and was eliminated during the semi-final.

On 17 January 2019, Brunović was announced as one of the participants of Dora 2019, the Croatian national final for the Eurovision Song Contest 2019, with the song "I Believe in True Love". On 16 February 2019, she performed during the selection final and placed sixth. On 15 December 2020, she was announced as one of the competitors at Dora 2021, which was to select Croatia's entry for the Eurovision Song Contest 2021, with the song "Colors", co-written with Borislav Milanov. During the national final on 13 February 2021, she finished in seventh place. On 17 December 2021, she was announced as one of the acts to perform at Dora 2022, this time selecting Croatia's entry for the Eurovision Song Contest 2022, with the song "Here for Love", which finished fourth in the final, held on 19 February 2022.

In 2025, Brunović returned as an "All Star" contestant on the fifteenth season of The Voice of Germany. All four of the show's coaches (Rea Garvey, Michi and Smudo, Shirin David, and Nico Santos) turned their chairs for her, with Brunović choosing to join Team Michi and Smudo. She made it to the final show, where she performed her new single "The Rain" and reached fourth place.

== Discography ==
=== Singles ===
- "Confidence" (2011)
- "Olujna noć" (2014)
- "Gdje da nađem mir" (2016)
- "Ti i ja" (2017)
- "I Believe in True Love" (2019)
- "Nebo" (2020)
- "Colors" (2021)
- "Here for Love" (2022)
- "The Rain" (2025)
