= Anne Mosters =

German singer

- Born: 17 November 2005 (age 20)
- Occupation: Singer
- Instruments: Vocals; Piano
- Years active: 2018–present

Anne Mosters (born 17 November 2005) is a German singer. She won the fifteenth season of the German talent competition The Voice of Germany in 2025, having competed on the team coached by Nico Santos. She has the distinction of being the first former contestant to compete and win a season, as she had competed on season 13 two years earlier.

== Personal life ==
Mosters currently resides in Alpen, where she graduated from high school from Amplonius-Gymnasium Rheinberg. According to her account, she began playing the piano and singing in choirs at a young age. In the region she resides, she has performed with her touring partner Hera Becks for years.

== Career ==
=== The Voice of Germany ===
==== 2023 ====
In 2023, Mosters auditioned for the thirteenth season of the reality competition show The Voice of Germany. In the auditions, she performed Adele's "Love in the Dark". Of the show's four coaches, Giovanni Zarrella, Bill & Tom Kaulitz, and Ronan Keating expressed interest in working with her (Shirin David did not). Mosters ultimately chose Keating as her coach. She progressed to the teamfights round of the competition where she was eliminated by the studio audience. After her elimination, Ronan Keating expressed shock and confusion, stating that it was "not okay".

Performances on The Voice of Germany 2023
Round	Song	Original artist	Original air date	Result
Blind Auditions	"Love in the Dark"	Adele	24 September 2023	Giovanni Zarrella, Bill & Tom Kaulitz, and Ronan Keating turned; elected to join Team Ronan.
Battles	"Hold Me Like You Used To" (vs. Valentina Franco)	Zoe Wees	21 October 2023	Saved by Ronan Keating
Teamfights	"Reflection"	Lea Salonga	17 November 2023	Eliminated from studio audience

==== 2025 ====
In 2025, Mosters returned as an "All Star" contestant on the fifteenth season of The Voice of Germany. The format for the season featured several previous contestants over the show's history that were eliminated prior to the final. In her audition, she sang "Because of You" by Kelly Clarkson. This time, all four coaches (Rea Garvey, Michi & Smudo, Shirin David, and Nico Santos) expressed interest in working with Mosters. After Michi & Smudo blocked David, Mosters decided to join Santos' team. She reached the final of the show where she was declared the winner of the season. Her margin of victory (1,58%) over runner-up Max Pesé was the closest in the show's history.

Performances on The Voice of Germany 2025
Round	Song	Original artist	Original air date	Result
Blind Auditions	"Because of You"	Kelly Clarkson	26 September 2025	Rea Garvey, Michi & Smudo, Shirin David, and Nico Santos turned; Shirin David blocked, elected to join Team Nico.
Battles	"Redbone" (vs. Rachel Leggio)	Childish Gambino	23 October 2025	Saved by Nico Santos
Teamfights	"Human"	Christina Perri	28 November 2025	Saved by studio audience
Semi-final (Top 14)	"I'll Never Love Again"	Lady Gaga	5 December 2025	Through to grand final
Final (Top 7)	"Gravity"	Anne Mosters	12 December 2025	Winner
Final (Top 7)	"How Will I Know" (with Nico Santos, Greta Heimann and Marvin Tapper)	Whitney Houston	12 December 2025	Winner

=== Releases ===
In 2025, Mosters released her first two singles: "Stuck Here" and "Gravity". "Stuck Here" was released on 4 April as her debut single, shortly before auditioning for season 15 of The Voice of Germany. She performed "Gravity" in the final of the show, before winning.

== Discography ==
=== Singles ===
- "Stuck Here" – 2025
- "Gravity" – 2025

Awards and achievements
Preceded by Jennifer Lynn	The Voice of Germany; Winner; 2025	Succeeded by TBA
