= The Voice of Germany season 16 =

Season of television series

The Voice of Germany
- Season 16
- Promotional poster featuring coaches Garvey, Santos, David, and Michi & Smudo
- Hosted by: Matthias Killing; Melissa Khalaj
- Coaches: Rea Garvey; Michi & Smudo; Shirin David; Nico Santos; Michael Schulte (battles, ep. 10); Delta Goodrem (battles, ep. 11); Giovanni Zarrella (battles, ep. 12); Sarah Engels (battles, ep. 13)

Release
- Original network: ProSieben; Sat.1
- Original release: 11 September 2026 – present

Season chronology
- ← Previous; Season 15

The sixteenth season of the talent show The Voice of Germany premiered on 11 September 2026 and is broadcast by the local television stations ProSieben and Sat.1.

Nico Santos, Shirin David, Rea Garvey, and duo Michi & Smudo all returned from the previous season for their fourth, third, ninth, and seventh seasons as coaches, respectively.

Thore Schölermann departed the show after serving as host for fourteen seasons. He was replaced by Matthias Killing, who joined Melissa Khalaj as co-host.

== Panelists ==
=== Coaches ===
The Voice of Germany season 16 coaches

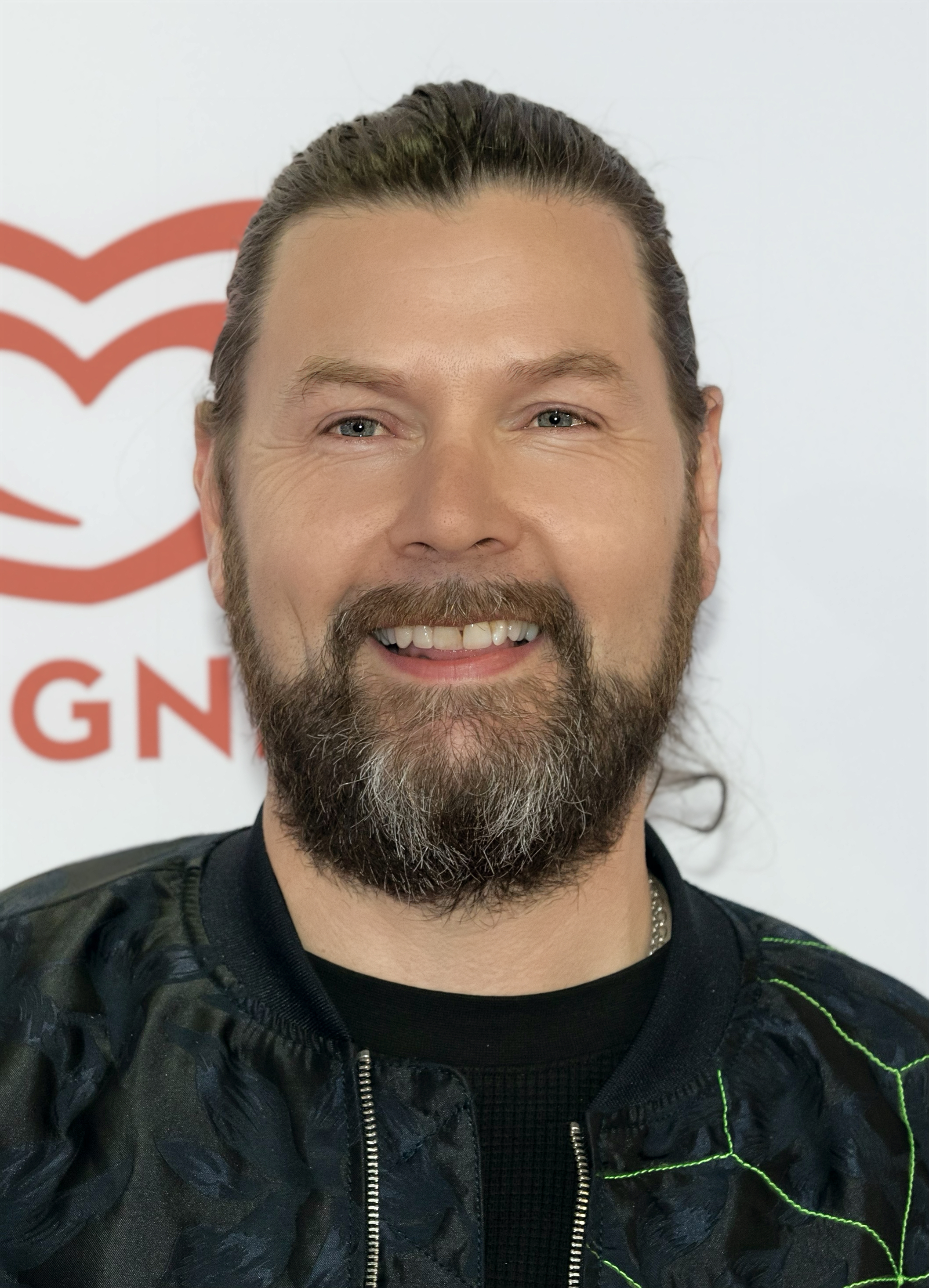
Rea Garvey

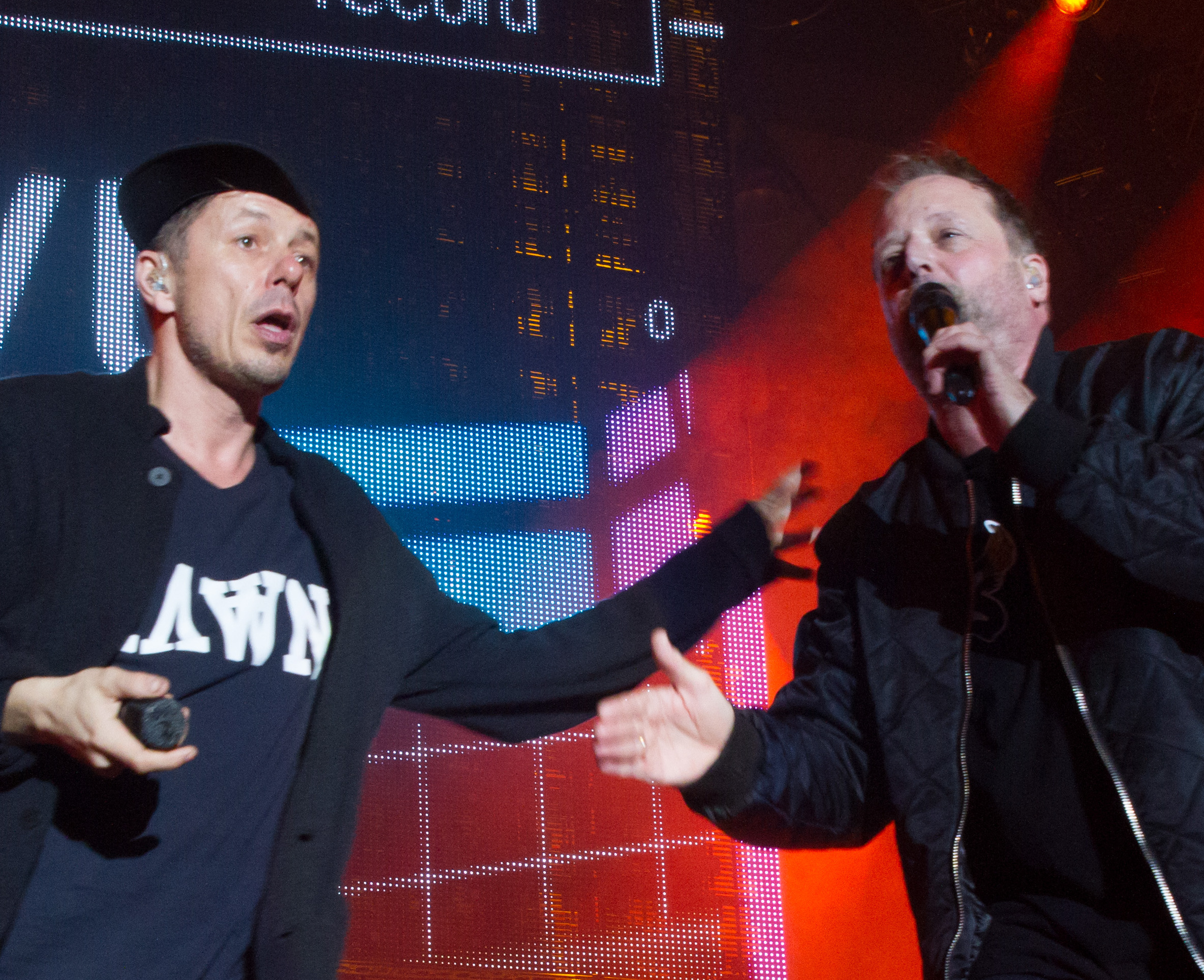
Michi & Smudo

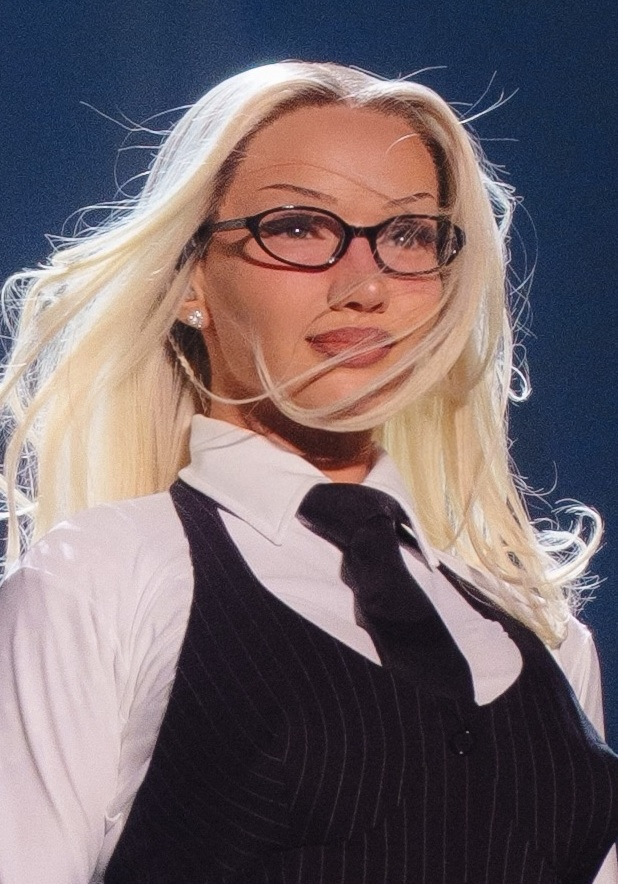
Shirin David

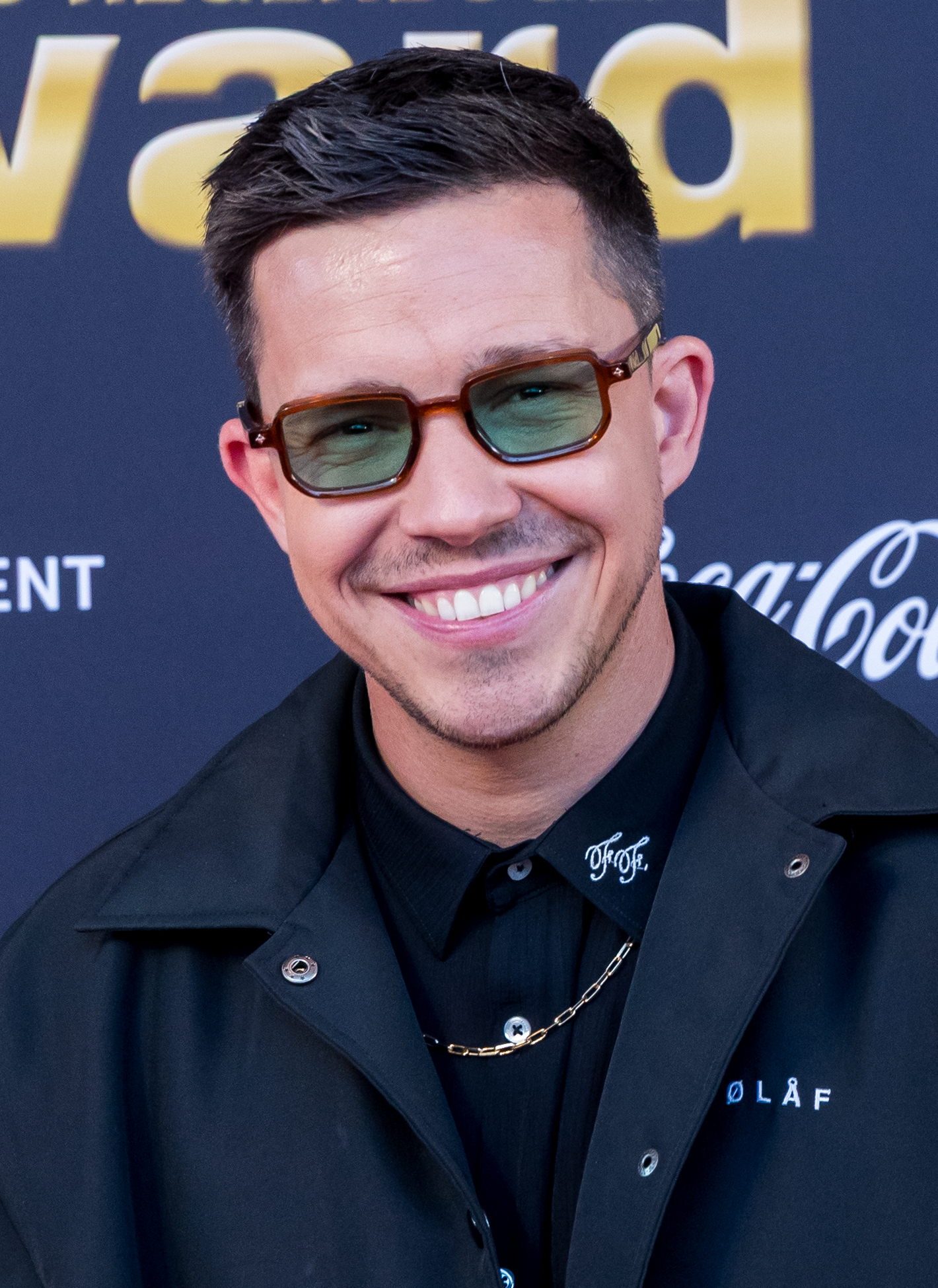
Nico Santos

On 27 April 2026, it was announced that Nico Santos, Shirin David, Rea Garvey, and Michi & Smudo would all return from the previous season. This marked the second time that the coaching panel had remained unchanged for more than two consecutive seasons, following season 2. It also marked the first time since the second season that no new coach joined the panel. Calum Scott did not return for the Comeback Stage.

=== Hosts ===
Thore Schölermann was announced to depart the series after his fourteenth season. Melissa Khalaj returned for her fifth full-time season as host, with Matthias Killing joining to co-host with her following Schölermann's departure. Schölermann made a brief appearance in the first episode where he was "coaching" Killing how to present.

== Teams ==
Teams color key
Winner	Seventh place
Runner-up	Eliminated in the Semifinals
Third place	Eliminated in the Teamfights
Fourth place	Eliminated in the Battle rounds
Fifth place	Withdrew
Sixth place

Coaching teams
Coaches	Top 66 Artists					
Rea Garvey						
Rea Garvey	Lisa Aithnard	Ruben Claro	Maja Atzmüller	Margo Junique	Philip Nsubuga	Breanna Burrone
Rea Garvey	Jessica Movahed Fard	Julia Vieregge	Abby Vogue	Anthony Bauer	Stefanie Friess	Mario Jackl
Rea Garvey	Katiuska McLean	Luca-Marie Schiavo	Isabelle Trittel	Bianca Basler		
Michi & Smudo						
Michi & Smudo	Timo Görnhardt	Ardina Petre	May Feiler	Mel Vadouniotis	Dozy Jane	Timo Jenewein
Michi & Smudo	Joachim Kenneweg	Kaye Nover	Nina Wink	Emrecan Arpaci	Emily Beadle	Bastian "Pelle" Franz
Michi & Smudo	Nicole Hagedorn	Marvin Hollederer	Kati Karney	Stephanie Joan Lingard	Butch Williams	
Shirin David						
Shirin David	Diogo Rosa	Aylin Basar	Jessica Paulo	Daniel Del Castillo	Mila Bouzid	Tom Bushin
Shirin David	Hank	Paul Huber	Emma Powda	Benjamin Bieck	Can Dean	Isabel Hernández
Shirin David	Laila Nöth	Maxime Swinkels	Vanessa Weiser	Lisa Windisch		
Nico Santos						
Nico Santos	Paul Nadler	Emma Josephine Stappenbeck	Soul-Food Vocalist	Janis Eric Thommen	Joel	Marika
Nico Santos	Lara Trautmann	Joe Jäger	Zayed	Leon Gerstner	Undine Lux	Darwin "Daris" Sanchez Pereyra
Nico Santos	Bjorn Shabanaga	Beatriz Simões	Tim & Mara	Anthony Uyumaz	Andy Zimmer	

== Blind Auditions ==
The Blind Auditions beegan broadcasting on 11 September 2026, and is broadcast every Friday on Sat.1 and every Saturday on ProSieben. Each coach has three blocks to prevent another coach from receiving an artist and one joker to further convince an artist to elect them as their coach. At the end of the blind auditions, each coach was supposed to end up with 17 artists, creating a total of 68 artists advancing to the battles. However, Rea Garvey and Shirin David only had sixteen artists on their respective teams at the end of the round, creating a total of 66 artists advancing to the battles. This is the third season in The Voice of Germany history where at least one coach (Nico Santos in this case) does not have a one-chair turn on their team. Santos also did not use his third block prior to the round's conclusion.

The four coaches performed separately at the start of the round. In the second episode, each coach performed one of their songs, Nico Santos performed "Ray of Light". Shirin David followed his performance with "Juicy Money". Rea Garvey then performed "Take This Heart" and Michi & Smudo performed last with "MFG"

Blind auditions color key
✔	Coach hit his/her "I WANT YOU" button
	Artist defaulted to this coach's team
	Artist elected to join this coach's team
	Artist was eliminated with no coach pressing their button
	Artist received an 'All Turn'.
	Coach used Joker on this artist
	Artist is an 'Allstar' contestant
✘	Coach pressed "I WANT YOU" button, but was blocked by another coach from getting the artist:
	Blocked by Rea; Blocked by Michi & Smudo; Blocked by Shirin; Blocked by Nico

Blind auditions results
Episode	Order	Artist	Age	Song	Coach's and artist's choices			
Episode	Order	Artist	Age	Song	Rea	Michi Smudo	Shirin	Nico
Episode 1 (11 September)	1	Lisa Aithnard	30	"Nothing's Real But Love"	✔	–	✘	✔
Episode 1 (11 September)	2	Paul Nadler	23	"Talking to the Moon"	–	✔	✔	✔
Episode 1 (11 September)	3	Marcel Häringer	39	"Here Without You"	–	–	–	–
Episode 1 (11 September)	4	Bianca Basler	28	"It's All Coming Back to Me Now"	✔	✘	✔	✔
Episode 1 (11 September)	5	Ruben Claro	37	"The Ballroom Blitz"	✔	✔	–	–
Episode 1 (11 September)	6	Oliver Schmitt	55	"Delilah"	–	–	–	–
Episode 1 (11 September)	7	Emma Josephine Stappenbeck	23	"Empire State of Mind"	✔	✔	✔	✔
Episode 1 (11 September)	8	Florian Knak	24	"Bauch und Kopf"	–	–	–	–
Episode 1 (11 September)	9	Stephanie Joan Lingard	43	"I See Red"	–	✔	✔	–
Episode 1 (11 September)	10	Rossano Gerhartz	17	"Vampire"	–	–	–	–
Episode 1 (11 September)	11	Julia Vieregge	41	"I'm with You"	✔	–	–	✔
Episode 2 (12 September)	1	Paul Huber	21	"T.N.T."	✘^{1}	✔	✔	–
Episode 2 (12 September)	2	Tom Bushin	31	"Skinny Love"	–	✔	✔	–
Episode 2 (12 September)	3	Viktoria Wieser	25	"What's Up?"	–	–	–	–
Episode 2 (12 September)	4	Abby Vogue	33	"Smells Like Teen Spirit"	✔	✔	–	✔
Episode 2 (12 September)	5	Giovanni Lombardo	33	"Gloria"	–	–	–	–
Episode 2 (12 September)	6	Beatriz Simões	33	"If I Were a Boy"	✔	✔	✔	✔
Episode 2 (12 September)	7	Savin Place	28 & 29	"Follow Me"	–	–	–	–
Episode 2 (12 September)	8	Nicole Hagedorn	51	"Der Weg"	–	✔	–	–
Episode 2 (12 September)	9	Can Dean	29	"Love U Anyway"	–	✔	✔	✔
Episode 2 (12 September)	10	Hank	46	"Broken Vow"	✔	✔	✔	✔
Episode 3 (18 September)	1	Darwin "Daris" Sanchez Pereyra	26	"Tití Me Preguntó"	✔	✔	✔	✔
Episode 3 (18 September)	2	Butch Williams	67	"Love's Divine"	–	✔	–	✔
Episode 3 (18 September)	3	Lara Vaupel	23	"Nemo"	–	–	–	–
Episode 3 (18 September)	4	Timo Görnhardt	24	"Blauer Ballon"	✔	✔	–	–
Episode 3 (18 September)	5	Emma Powda	26	"Escapism"	✔	✔	✔	✔
Episode 3 (18 September)	6	Kilian Schmitt	22	"Heartache Tonight"	–	–	–	–
Episode 3 (18 September)	7	Maxime Swinkels	22	"Helium"	✔	–	✔	–
Episode 3 (18 September)	8	Sarah Karabatic	23	"Sk8er Boi"	–	–	–	–
Episode 3 (18 September)	9	Stefanie Friess	48	"Winter"	✔	✔	–	–
Episode 3 (18 September)	10	Frederic Levi	24	"Bad Dreams"	–	–	–	–
Episode 3 (18 September)	11	Soul-Food Vocalist (Carmen, Francesco, Antonella, Simone)	33–57	"Caruso"	✔	✔	✘	✔
Episode 4 (19 September)	1	Isabel Hernández	39	"Llorarás"	✔	✔	✔	✔
Episode 4 (19 September)	2	Leroy Erxleben	19	"Schön genug"	–	–	–	–
Episode 4 (19 September)	3	Joe Jäger	19	"Drops of Jupiter"	✔	✔	–	✔
Episode 4 (19 September)	4	Andy Zimmer	29	"Simple Man"	–	✔	–	✔
Episode 4 (19 September)	5	Gloria Paletta	17	"I Kissed a Girl"	–	–	–	–
Episode 4 (19 September)	6	Bastian "Pelle" Franz	32	"Du schreibst Geschichte"	✔	✔	–	–
Episode 4 (19 September)	7	Tim & Mara	33 & 25	"Happy Ever After You"	✔	✔	–	✔
Episode 4 (19 September)	8	Simon Loughton	37	"I'd Do Anything for Love (But I Won't Do That)"	–	–	–	–
Episode 4 (19 September)	9	Katiuska McLean	48	"Skyfall"	✔	–	–	–
Episode 4 (19 September)	10	Tommy Morgenstern	52	"Dear Mr. President"	–	–	–	–
Episode 4 (19 September)	11	Janis Eric Thommen	25	"Hymne à l'amour"	✘	✔	✔	✔
Episode 5 (25 September)	1	Zayed	21	"One and Only"	–	✔	✔	✔
Episode 5 (25 September)	2	Ardina Petre	27	"Anxiety"	–	✔	–	✘
Episode 5 (25 September)	3	Simone Olivetti	36	"Laura non c'è"	–	–	–	–
Episode 5 (25 September)	4	Reiner Reisdorf	65	"Streets of London"	–	–	–	–
Episode 5 (25 September)	5	Benjamin Bieck	16	"Barfuß am Klavier"	–	✔	✔	✘
Episode 5 (25 September)	6	Jessica Movahed Fard	38	"River"	✔	✔	–	–
Episode 5 (25 September)	7	Aylin Basar	19	"Die on This Hill"	✔	✔	✔	✔^{2}
Episode 5 (25 September)	8	Kevin Manthei	35	"Sophia Loren"	–	–	–	–
Episode 5 (25 September)	9	Kaye Nover	36	"Wicked Game"	–	✔	–	–
Episode 5 (25 September)	10	Lena Bronckhorst	27	"Someone like You"	–	–	–	–
Episode 5 (25 September)	11	Joel	31	"Ballerina"	✔	✔	✔	✔
Episode 6 (26 September)	1	Isabelle Trittel	29	"Love You I Do"	✔	✔	✔	✔
Episode 6 (26 September)	2	Andre Berres	27	"Tears Don't Fall"	–	–	–	–
Episode 6 (26 September)	3	Undine Lux	38	"Ich liebe das Leben"	–	✔	–	✔
Episode 6 (26 September)	4	Ben Müller	31	"Unchain My Heart"	–	–	–	–
Episode 6 (26 September)	5	Dozy Jane	34	"Stop!"	✔	✔	✘	–
Episode 6 (26 September)	6	Elijah Peiler	23	"Riding to New York"	–	–	–	–
Episode 6 (26 September)	7	Marika	33	"Lila Wolken"	✔	✔	–	✔
Episode 6 (26 September)	8	Emrecan Arpaci	40	"Dostun Gül Cemali"	✔	✔	–	–
Episode 6 (26 September)	9	Yvonne Herrmann	40	"You Shook Me All Night Long"	–	–	–	–
Episode 6 (26 September)	10	Anthony Bauer	54	"You're the First, the Last, My Everything"	✔	–	–	–
Episode 6 (26 September)	11	Mila Bouzid	32	"No Tears Left to Cry"	–	–	✔	✔
Episode 6 (26 September)	12	Jason Bauer	24	"Stand by Me"	–	–	–	–
Episode 7 (2 October)^{3}	1	Daniel Del Castillo	26	"Beyond the Sea"	–	✔	✔	–
Episode 7 (2 October)^{3}	2	May Feiler	56	"Wind Beneath My Wings"	✔	✔	–	–
Episode 7 (2 October)^{3}	3	JP Storm	31	"Human"	–	–	–	–
Episode 7 (2 October)^{3}	4	Bjorn Shabanaga	19	"Human Nature"	✘	✔	✔	✔
Episode 7 (2 October)^{3}	5	Vivien Raquel Pigulla	30	"110 (Prolog)"	–	–	–	–
Episode 7 (2 October)^{3}	6	Margo Junique	19	"Slipping Through My Fingers"	✔	–	–	–
Episode 7 (2 October)^{3}	7	Joachim Kenneweg	26	"Eisberg"	–	✔	✔	✔
Episode 7 (2 October)^{3}	8	Jonas & Frederik	27 & 25	"Stick Season"	–	–	–	–
Episode 7 (2 October)^{3}	9	Luca-Marie Schiavo	22	"The Climb"	✔	✔	–	–
Episode 7 (2 October)^{3}	10	Raul Wessely	33	"(Sittin' On) The Dock of the Bay"	–	–	–	–
Episode 7 (2 October)^{3}	11	Marvin Hollederer	34	"Regen und Meer"	–	✔^{4}	–	–
Episode 7 (2 October)^{3}	12	Adisa Schäfer	36	"Try Again"	–	–	–	–
Episode 7 (2 October)^{3}	13	Jessica Paulo	20	"Oceans (Where Feet May Fail)"	✔	✔	✔	✘
Episode 8 (3 October)	1	Maja Atzmüller	21	"Piece of My Heart"	✔	–	–	–
Episode 8 (3 October)	2	Tom Mostert	21	"Primadonna"	–	–	–	–
Episode 8 (3 October)	3	Laila Nöth	31	"Männer sind Schweine"	–	–	✔	✔
Episode 8 (3 October)	4	Ramon Nischwitz	21	"Survive"	–	–	–	–
Episode 8 (3 October)	5	Kati Karney	53	"Saving All My Love for You"	–	✔	–	–
Episode 8 (3 October)	6	Leon Gerstner	25	"Mamma Mia"	✔	✔	✔	✔
Episode 8 (3 October)	7	Patrick Keil	39	"Dein ist min ganzs Herz"	–	–	–	–
Episode 8 (3 October)	8	Emily Beadle	19	"We Are the Champions"	–	✔	–	–
Episode 8 (3 October)	9	Diogo Rosa	22	"Careless Whisper"	✔	–	✔	–
Episode 8 (3 October)	10	Alina Sebastian	28	"Need You Now"	–	–	–	–
Episode 8 (3 October)	11	Mel Vardouniotis	25	"Crazy in Love"	✔	✔	–	✘
Episode 8 (3 October)	12	Judith Harke	40	"Ja"	–	–	–	–
Episode 8 (3 October)	13	Anthony Uyumaz	25	"U Got It Bad"	–	✔	–	✔
Episode 9 (10 October)	1	Breanna Burrone	28	"I Was Made for Lovin' You"	✔	–	✔	✔
Episode 9 (10 October)	2	Dominik Wieltsch	22	"Sorry"	–	–	–	–
Episode 9 (10 October)	3	Nina Wink	23	"Nur geträumt"	–	✔	–	✔
Episode 9 (10 October)	4	Mario Jackl	31	"The Book of Love"	✔	–	–	–
Episode 9 (10 October)	5	Tugra Kilic	20	"Bed of Roses"	–	–	–	–
Episode 9 (10 October)	6	Lisa Windisch	35	"Hoochie Coochie Gal"	–	✔	✔	✔
Episode 9 (10 October)	7	Timo Jenewein	32	"Starlight"	✔	✔	–	–
Episode 9 (10 October)	8	Ricky Coleman	25	"Rock with You"	–	Team Full	–	–
Episode 9 (10 October)	9	Vanessa Weiser	31	"Kleiner Finger Schwur"	–	Team Full	✔	–
Episode 9 (10 October)	10	Lara Trautmann	37	"The Dragonborn Comes"	✔	Team Full	–	✔
Episode 9 (10 October)	11	Felix Vogginger	21	"Heal"	–	Team Full	–	Team Full
Episode 9 (10 October)	12	Philip Nsubuga	28	"Gone Gone Gone"	✔	Team Full	–	Team Full
Episode 9 (10 October)	13	Linus Schölzel	22	"Chicago"	–	Team Full	–	Team Full

^1 Rea attempted to use his joker, however Shirin had already blocked him.
^2 Shirin originally blocked Nico, but later took it back and the block was removed making Nico eligible to be picked
^3 Following Raul Wessely's audition, host Melissa Khalaj performed "Man I Need". Nico willingly turned his chair while Khalaj pressed the button for Shirin, Michi & Smudo, and Rea, respectively.
^4 Michi & Smudo tried to turn for Marvin at the last second; however, their button did not activate. Nonetheless, during comments, they were allowed to acquire him for their team.

== Battles ==
The Voice of Germany season 16 guest coaches

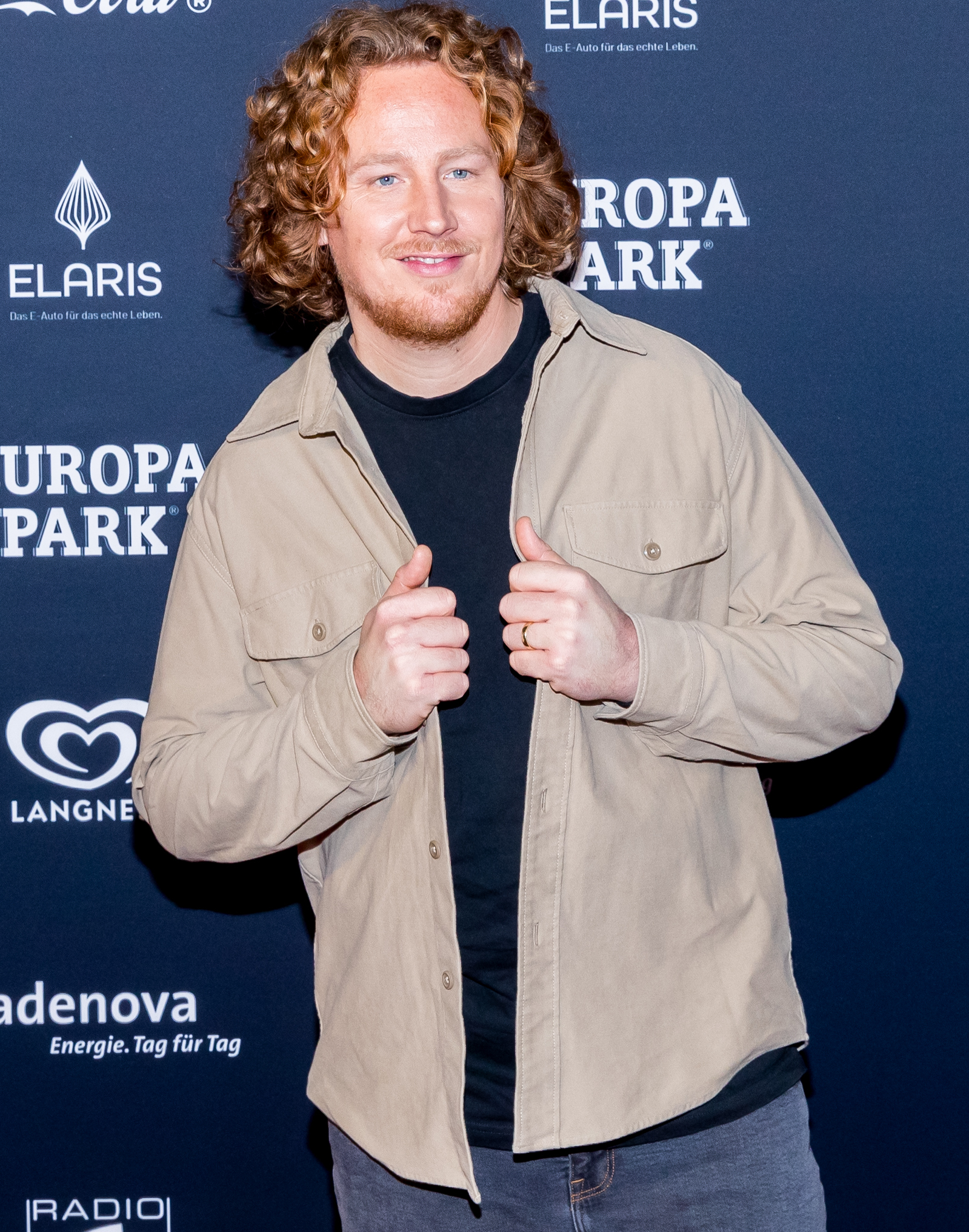
Michael Schulte

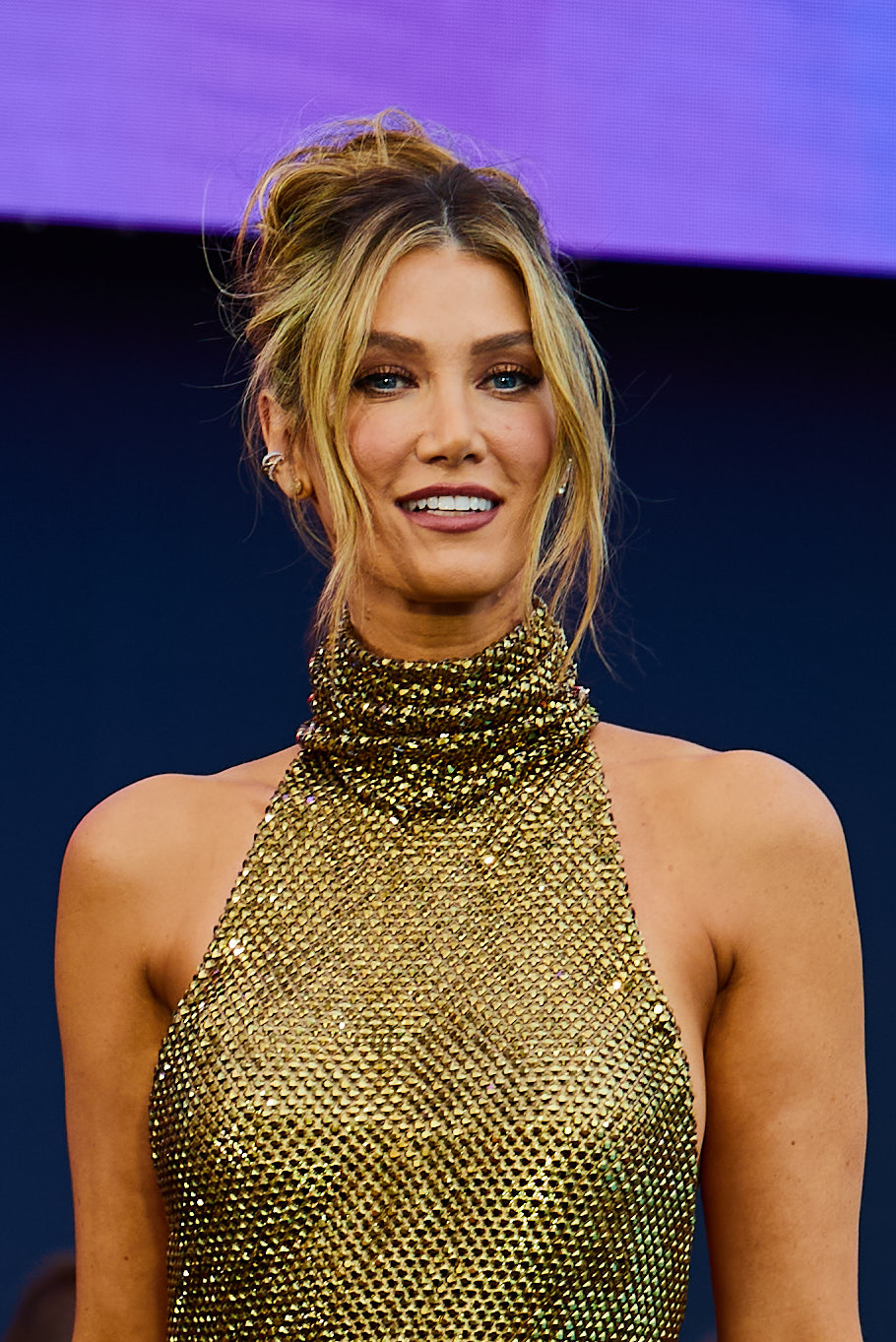
Delta Goodrem

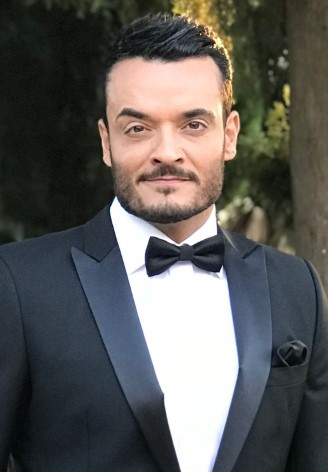
Giovanni Zarrella

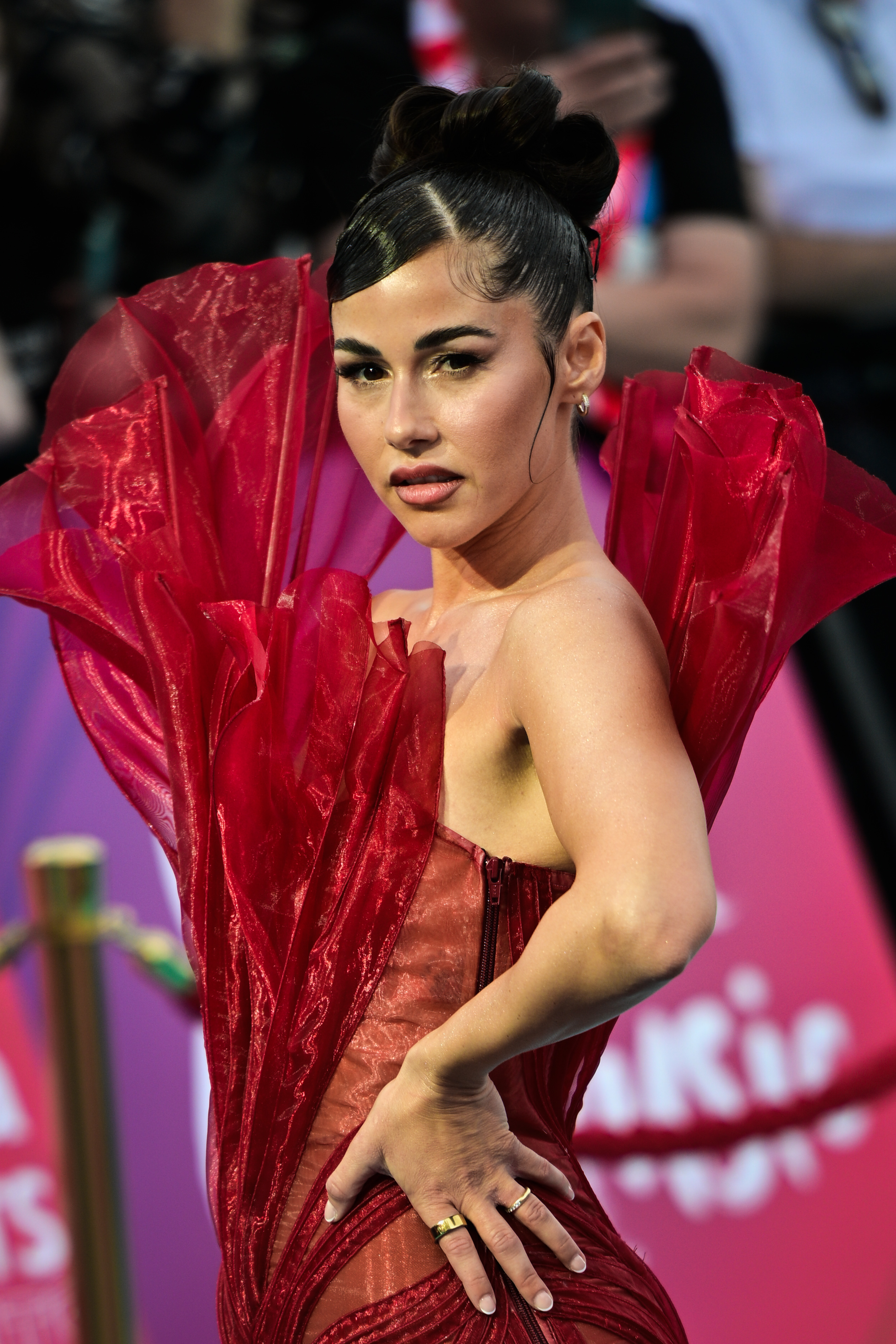
Sarah Engels

The Battles aired from 17 October to 6 November 2026, with the first episode airing on a Saturday, followed by three consecutive Friday broadcasts. Artists are divided into pairs (with Teams Nico and Michi & Smudo having one trio) to perform a song together. Each coach could select any number of candidates of each battle into the next phase, with each battle having one, multiple, or no winner.

Like last season, a fifth guest coach is present in each episode of the round: season 10's comeback coach, Michael Schulte, former The Voice Australia coach Delta Goodrem, season 13 coach Giovanni Zarrella, and Sarah Engels all made appearances as guest coaches for episodes 10 through 13 respectively. In each episode, the guest coach awards one battle the "Battle of the Night" in terms of performance quality. The coach that has those artists on his/her team therefore gains an advantage in teamfights: the coach can block a challenging coach. The battle recipients of the awards were Diogo Rosa & Aylin Basar from Team Shirin, Emma Powda & Mila Bouzid from Team Shirin, Daniel Del Castillo & Isabel Hernández from Team Shirin, and Soul-Food Vocalist & Zayed from Team Nico.

Each coach should have 9 artists remaining on their team by the end of the battles.

Battle rounds color key
Artist won the Battle and advanced to the Teamfights
Artist lost the Battle and was eliminated
Battle was declared the "Battle of the Night" by that episode's guest coach

Episode	Coach	Order	Winner(s)	Song	Loser(s)
Episode 10 (17 October)	Nico	1	Joe Jäger	"Use Somebody"	Andy Zimmer
Episode 10 (17 October)	Shirin	2	Diogo Rosa	"What Was I Made For?"	N/A
Episode 10 (17 October)	Shirin	2	Aylin Basar	"What Was I Made For?"	N/A
Episode 10 (17 October)	Michi & Smudo	3	Timo Jenewein	"Beautiful Day"	Emily Beadle
Episode 10 (17 October)	Rea	4	Breanna Burrone	"Think"	Isabelle Trittel
Episode 10 (17 October)	Nico	5	Lara Trautmann	"Soulmate"	Undine Lux
Episode 10 (17 October)	Michi & Smudo	6	Nina Wink	"Zorn & Liebe"	Marvin Hollederer
Episode 10 (17 October)	Michi & Smudo	6	Nina Wink	"Zorn & Liebe"	Bastian "Pelle" Franz
Episode 10 (17 October)	Shirin	7	Tom Bushin	"Supergirl"	Maxime Swinkels
Episode 10 (17 October)	Rea	8	Bianca Basler^{1}	"Stone Cold"	N/A
Episode 10 (17 October)	Rea	8	Julia Vieregge	"Stone Cold"	N/A
Episode 11 (23 October)	Michi & Smudo	1	Mel Vadouniotis	"Another Way to Die"	Stephanie Joan Lingard
Episode 11 (23 October)	Nico	2	N/A	"You're Still the One"	Bjorn Shabanaga
Episode 11 (23 October)	Nico	2	N/A	"You're Still the One"	Tim & Mara
Episode 11 (23 October)	Shirin	3	Emma Powda	"Unholy"	N/A
Episode 11 (23 October)	Shirin	3	Mila Bouzid	"Unholy"	N/A
Episode 11 (23 October)	Rea	4	Philip Nsubuga	"Sunny"	Anthony Bauer
Episode 11 (23 October)	Nico	5	Emma Josephine Stappenbeck	"Oscar Winning Tears"	N/A
Episode 11 (23 October)	Nico	5	Marika	"Oscar Winning Tears"	N/A
Episode 11 (23 October)	Rea	6	Margo Junique	"Drivers License"	Luca-Marie Schiavo
Episode 11 (23 October)	Shirin	7	Hank	"The Sound of Silence" / "Gratitude"	N/A
Episode 11 (23 October)	Shirin	7	Jessica Paulo	"The Sound of Silence" / "Gratitude"	N/A
Episode 11 (23 October)	Michi & Smudo	8	May Feiler	"When You Believe"	Kati Karney
Episode 12 (30 October)	Rea	1	Abby Vogue	"Bang Bang"	N/A
Episode 12 (30 October)	Rea	1	Jessica Movahed Fard	"Bang Bang"	N/A
Episode 12 (30 October)	Michi & Smudo	2	Timo Görnhardt	"Fluss"	Nicole Hagedorn
Episode 12 (30 October)	Nico	3	Joel	"Arcade"	N/A
Episode 12 (30 October)	Nico	3	Janis Eric Thommen	"Arcade"	N/A
Episode 12 (30 October)	Michi & Smudo	4	Dozy Jane	"When Doves Cry"	Butch Williams
Episode 12 (30 October)	Shirin	5	N/A	"LOV"	Laila Nöth
Episode 12 (30 October)	Shirin	5	N/A	"LOV"	Can Dean
Episode 12 (30 October)	Shirin	6	Daniel Del Castillo	"¿Quién será?"	Isabel Hernández
Episode 12 (30 October)	Rea	7	Lisa Aithnard	"You Say"	Mario Jackl
Episode 12 (30 October)	Nico	8	Paul Nadler	"Don't Let the Sun Go Down on Me"	Beatriz Simões
Episode 13 (6 November)	Michi & Smudo	1	Joachim Kenneweg	"Everybody Wants to Rule the World"	N/A
Episode 13 (6 November)	Michi & Smudo	1	Kaye Nover	"Everybody Wants to Rule the World"	N/A
Episode 13 (6 November)	Shirin	2	N/A	"Unter die Haut"	Benjamin Bieck
Episode 13 (6 November)	Shirin	2	N/A	"Unter die Haut"	Vanessa Weiser
Episode 13 (6 November)	Nico	3	Soul-Food Vocalist	"Fall on Me"	
Episode 13 (6 November)	Nico	3	Zayed	"Fall on Me"	
Episode 13 (6 November)	Shirin	4	Paul Huber	"The Emptiness Machine"	Lisa Windisch
Episode 13 (6 November)	Rea	5	N/A	"Stay"	Katiuska McLean
Episode 13 (6 November)	Rea	5	N/A	"Stay"	Stefanie Friess
Episode 13 (6 November)	Michi & Smudo	6	Ardina Petre	"Isyankar"	Emrecan Arpaci
Episode 13 (6 November)	Rea	7	Ruben Claro	"Rebel Yell"	N/A
Episode 13 (6 November)	Rea	7	Maja Atzmüller	"Rebel Yell"	N/A
Episode 13 (6 November)	Nico	8	N/A	"Beauty and a Beat"	Anthony Uyumaz
Episode 13 (6 November)	Nico	8	N/A	"Beauty and a Beat"	Leon Gerstner
Episode 13 (6 November)	Nico	8	N/A	"Beauty and a Beat"	Darwin "Daris" Sanchez Pereyra

^1 Basler withdrew from the competition after winning her battle, citing her pregnancy as the reason.

== Teamfights ==
The teamfights were recorded on 28 and 29 June 2026. It began broadcasting only by Sat.1 on Friday nights starting 13 November 2026. In this stage of the competition, 12 artists appeared in each of three rounds. First, one artist per team sang and took a seat on one of four chairs called "hotseat". Once these seats were occupied, the next artist challenged one of the seated artists, and after the artists' performance, the studio audience decided who was allowed to take the seat. This process was repeated until all 12 had performed. The coach whose artists received the "Battle of the Night" awards in each episode of the battles gained the advantage of being able to block a challenger in this round; Shirin has three blocks to use, while Nico has one to use. At the end of each episode, the 4 artists seated at the end of each episode, from any team, advanced to the semi-final. A coach had the possibility to lose all of their artists, or bring all of their artists to the semi-finals. However, every coach was represented in the semi-finals and every coach did not bring their entire team to the semi-finals after this round.

Teamfights color key
Artist was seated and advanced to the live shows
Artist was seated but was swapped and eliminated
Artist was not seated and was eliminated

Episode	Coach	Order	Artist	Song	Challenged Artist	Hotseat
Episode 14 (13 November)	Rea	1	Jessica Movahed Fard	"Mamma Knows Best"	—N/a	Put in Hot-seat 1
Episode 14 (13 November)	Shirin	2	Mila Bouzid	"Greedy"	—N/a	Put in Hot-seat 2
Episode 14 (13 November)	Nico	3	Janis Eric Thommen	"Lay Me Down"	—N/a	Put in Hot-seat 3
Episode 14 (13 November)	Michi & Smudo	4	Dozy Jane	"Heavy on My Heart"	—N/a	Put in Hot-seat 4
Episode 14 (13 November)	Rea	5	Julia Vieregge	"Alles aus Liebe"	Dozy Jane	Put in Hot-seat 4
Episode 14 (13 November)	Shirin	6	Emma Powda	"Bitch Better Have My Money"	Jessica Movahed Fard	Eliminated
Episode 14 (13 November)	Nico	7	Lara Trautmann	"Voilà"	Mila Bouzid	Put in Hot-seat 2
Episode 14 (13 November)	Michi & Smudo	8	Timo Jenewein	"Incomplete"	Janis Eric Thommen	Eliminated
Episode 14 (13 November)	Rea	9	Breanna Burrone	"Love on the Brain"	Janis Eric Thommen	Eliminated
Episode 14 (13 November)	Shirin	10	Paul Huber	"Let Me Entertain You"	Julia Vieregge	Eliminated
Episode 14 (13 November)	Nico	11	Marika	"Doo Wop (That Thing)"	Jessica Movahed Fard	Put in Hot-seat 1
Episode 14 (13 November)	Michi & Smudo	12	Mel Vardouniotis	"Creep"	Julia Vieregge	Put in Hot-seat 4
Episode 15 (20 November)	Michi & Smudo	1	Kaye Nover	"Legends Never Die"	—N/a	Put in Hot-seat 1
Episode 15 (20 November)	Shirin	2	Aylin Basar	"You Stole the Show"	—N/a	Put in Hot-seat 2
Episode 15 (20 November)	Rea	3	Abby Vogue	"Purple Rain"	—N/a	Put in Hot-seat 3
Episode 15 (20 November)	Nico	4	Joe Jäger	"When I Was Your Man"	—N/a	Put in Hot-seat 4
Episode 15 (20 November)	Michi & Smudo	5	Joachim Kenneweg	"Chasing Cars"	Joe Jäger	Eliminated
Episode 15 (20 November)	Shirin	6	Tom Bushin	"Hallelujah"	Kaye Nover	Put in Hot-seat 1
Episode 15 (20 November)	Rea	7	Lisa Aithnard	"Glory"	Joe Jäger	Put in Hot-seat 4
Episode 15 (20 November)	Nico	8	Joel	"Somebody to Love"	Abby Vogue	Put in Hot-seat 3
Episode 15 (20 November)	Michi & Smudo	9	Nina Wink	"Durch die schweren Zeiten"	Tom Bushin	Eliminated
Episode 15 (20 November)	Shirin	10	Hank	"Bohemian Rhapsody"	Joel	Eliminated
Episode 15 (20 November)	Rea	11	Maja Atzmüller	"Cry Baby"	Tom Bushin	Put in Hot-seat 1
Episode 15 (20 November)	Nico	12	Zayed	"Listen"	Maja Atzmüller	Eliminated
Episode 16 (27 November)		1			—N/a	Put in Hot-seat 1
Episode 16 (27 November)		2			—N/a	Put in Hot-seat 2
Episode 16 (27 November)		3			—N/a	Put in Hot-seat 3
Episode 16 (27 November)		4			—N/a	Put in Hot-seat 4
Episode 16 (27 November)		5				
Episode 16 (27 November)		6				
Episode 16 (27 November)		7				
Episode 16 (27 November)		8				
Episode 16 (27 November)		9				
Episode 16 (27 November)		10				
Episode 16 (27 November)		11				
Episode 16 (27 November)		12				

Detailed chairs' changes
Episode	Order	Hotseat 1	Hotseat 2	Hotseat 3	Hotseat 4
Episode 14	4	Jessica Movahed Fard	Mila Bouzid	Janis Eric Thommen	Dozy Jane
Episode 14	5	Jessica Movahed Fard	Mila Bouzid	Janis Eric Thommen	Julia Vieregge
Episode 14	6	Jessica Movahed Fard	Mila Bouzid	Janis Eric Thommen	Julia Vieregge
Episode 14	7	Jessica Movahed Fard	Lara Trautmann	Janis Eric Thommen	Julia Vieregge
Episode 14	8	Jessica Movahed Fard	Lara Trautmann	Janis Eric Thommen	Julia Vieregge
Episode 14	9	Jessica Movahed Fard	Lara Trautmann	Janis Eric Thommen	Julia Vieregge
Episode 14	10	Jessica Movahed Fard	Lara Trautmann	Janis Eric Thommen	Julia Vieregge
Episode 14	11	Marika	Lara Trautmann	Janis Eric Thommen	Julia Vieregge
Episode 14	12	Marika	Lara Trautmann	Janis Eric Thommen	Mel Vardouniotis
Episode 15	4	Kaye Nover	Aylin Basar	Abby Vogue	Joe Jäger
Episode 15	5	Kaye Nover	Aylin Basar	Abby Vogue	Joe Jäger
Episode 15	6	Tom Bushin	Aylin Basar	Abby Vogue	Joe Jäger
Episode 15	7	Tom Bushin	Aylin Basar	Abby Vogue	Lisa Aithnard
Episode 15	8	Tom Bushin	Aylin Basar	Joel	Lisa Aithnard
Episode 15	9	Tom Bushin	Aylin Basar	Joel	Lisa Aithnard
Episode 15	10	Tom Bushin	Aylin Basar	Joel	Lisa Aithnard
Episode 15	11	Maja Atzmüller	Aylin Basar	Joel	Lisa Aithnard
Episode 15	12	Maja Atzmüller	Aylin Basar	Joel	Lisa Aithnard

== Elimination Chart ==
Coaches color key

- Artist from Team Rea
- Artist from Team Michi & Smudo
- Artist from Team Shirin
- Artist from Team Nico

Results color key

- Winner
- Runner-up
- Third place
- Fourth place
- Fifth place
- Sixth place
- Seventh place
- Artist was saved by the public vote
- Artist was eliminated

Overall Results
Artist	Week 1 Semi-Final	Week 2 Final
Lisa Aithnard		
Maja Atzmüller		
Aylin Basar		
Joel		
Marika		
Janis Eric Thommen		
Lara Trautmann		
Mel Vadouniotis		

== Contestants who appeared on other TV shows or previous seasons ==
=== All-star contestants ===
- Butch Williams competed in the inaugural season as part of The BossHoss' team and was eliminated in the battles.
- Katiuska McLean competed in the tenth season as part of Samu Haber & Rea Garvey's team and was eliminated in the battles.
- Joel competed in the eleventh season under his real name Joel Zupan as part of Sarah Connor's team and was eliminated in the quarterfinals.
- Marika competed in the tenth season under her real name Maria Nicolaides as part of Yvonne Catterfeld & Stefanie Kloß's team and was eliminated in the sing-offs.
- Mel Vadouniotis competed in the seventh season under Melvin Vardouniotis and as part of Yvonne Catterfeld's team and was eliminated in the semi-finals.
- Lara Trautmann competed in the sixth season as part of Michi & Smudo's team and was eliminated in the knockouts.

=== Other TV shows ===
- Emma Powda previously competed in the inaugural season of The Voice Kids as part of Lena Meyer-Landrut's team and was eliminated in the battles.
- Leroy Erxleben previously competed in the eighth season of The Voice Kids as part of Deine Freunde's team and finished as a finalist.
- Patrick Keil appeared in the fourteenth season of Deutschland sucht den Superstar and made it to the third round of the Auslandsrecall in Dubai.
- Soul-Food Vocalist appeared in the first season of The Voice Generations Italy as part of Gigi D'Alessio's team and finished as a finalist.
- Kati Karney was a member of MeKaDo who finished 3rd for Germany in the Eurovision Song Contest 1994.
