= The Voice of Germany season 15 =

Season of television series

The Voice of Germany
- Season 15
- Promotional poster featuring coaches Santos, Garvey, David, and Michi & Smudo
- Hosted by: Thore Schölermann; Melissa Khalaj
- Coaches: Rea Garvey; Michi & Smudo; Shirin David; Nico Santos; Calum Scott (Comeback stage); Joy Denalane (battles, ep. 9); Tim Bendzko (battles, ep. 10); Cro (battles, ep. 11); Álvaro Soler (battles, ep. 12)
- Winner: Anne Mosters
- Winning coach: Nico Santos
- Runner-up: Max Pesé

Release
- Original network: ProSieben; Sat.1
- Original release: 25 September – 12 December 2025

Season chronology
- ← Previous; Season 14 Next → Season 16

The fifteenth season of the talent show The Voice of Germany premiered on 25 September 2025. The show is broadcast by two local TV stations, ProSieben and Sat.1, during the Blind Auditions and the Battles.

Shirin David, Rea Garvey, Nico Santos, and duo Michi & Smudo returned as coaches after one, two, three, and six-season hiatuses, respectively. Calum Scott is the new "Comeback Stage" coach, selecting contestants to participate in The Voice: Comeback Stage by SEAT. Thore Schölermann returned for his fourteenth season as host, with Melissa Khalaj returning for her fourth season as host.

Anne Mosters won the season with the closest margin of victory in the show's history (1,58%), marking Nico Santos' first win as a coach. Mosters became the first "All Star" contestant in the history of the show to win a season (she previously competed in the thirteenth season and was eliminated in teamfights). Additionally, Mosters became the second artist to win a season that had a coach blocked in their blind audition (Michi & Smudo blocking Shirin), following Malou Lovis Kreyelkamp in the thirteenth season.

== Panelists ==
=== Coaches ===
The Voice of Germany season 15 main coaches

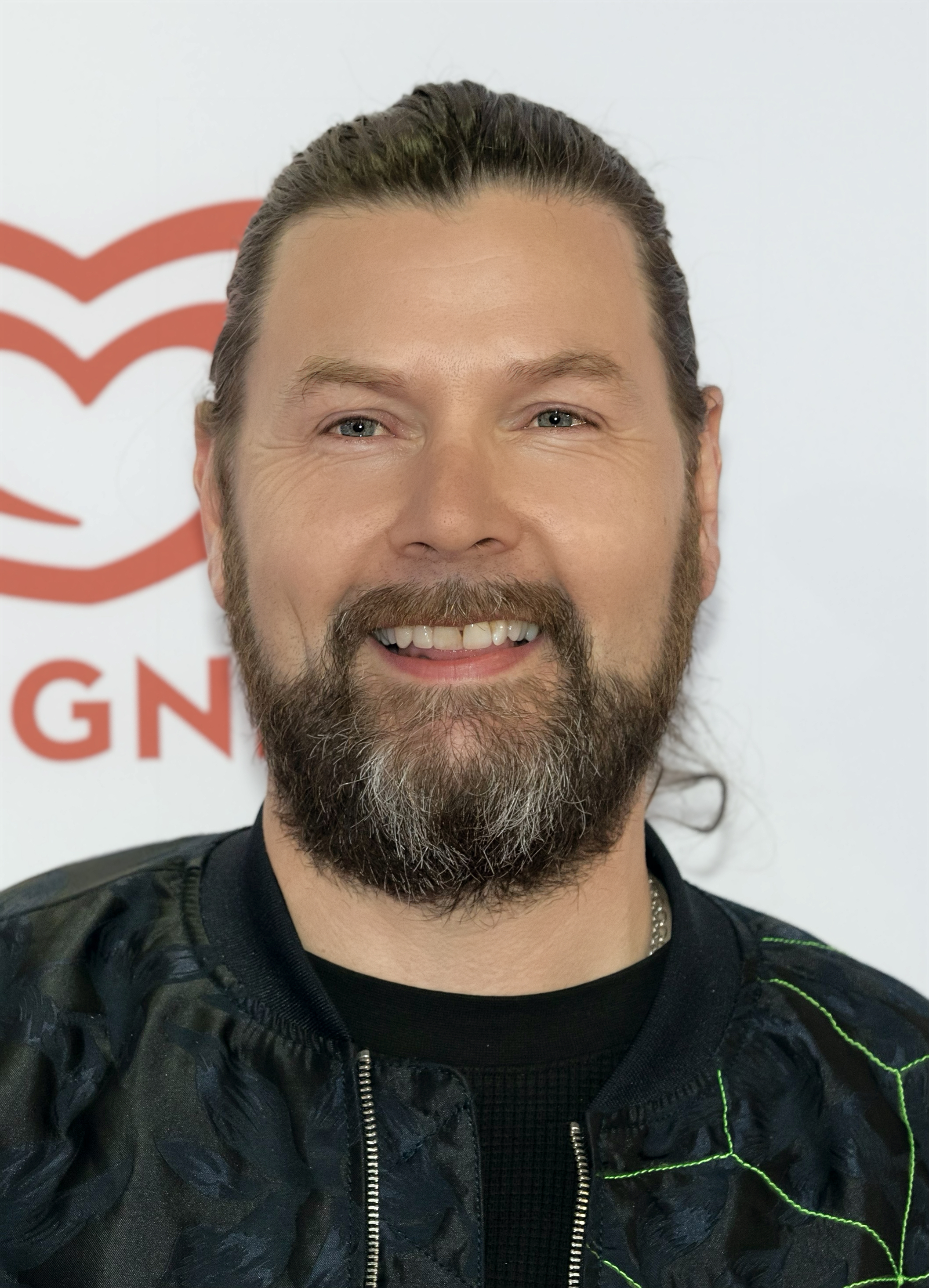
Rea Garvey

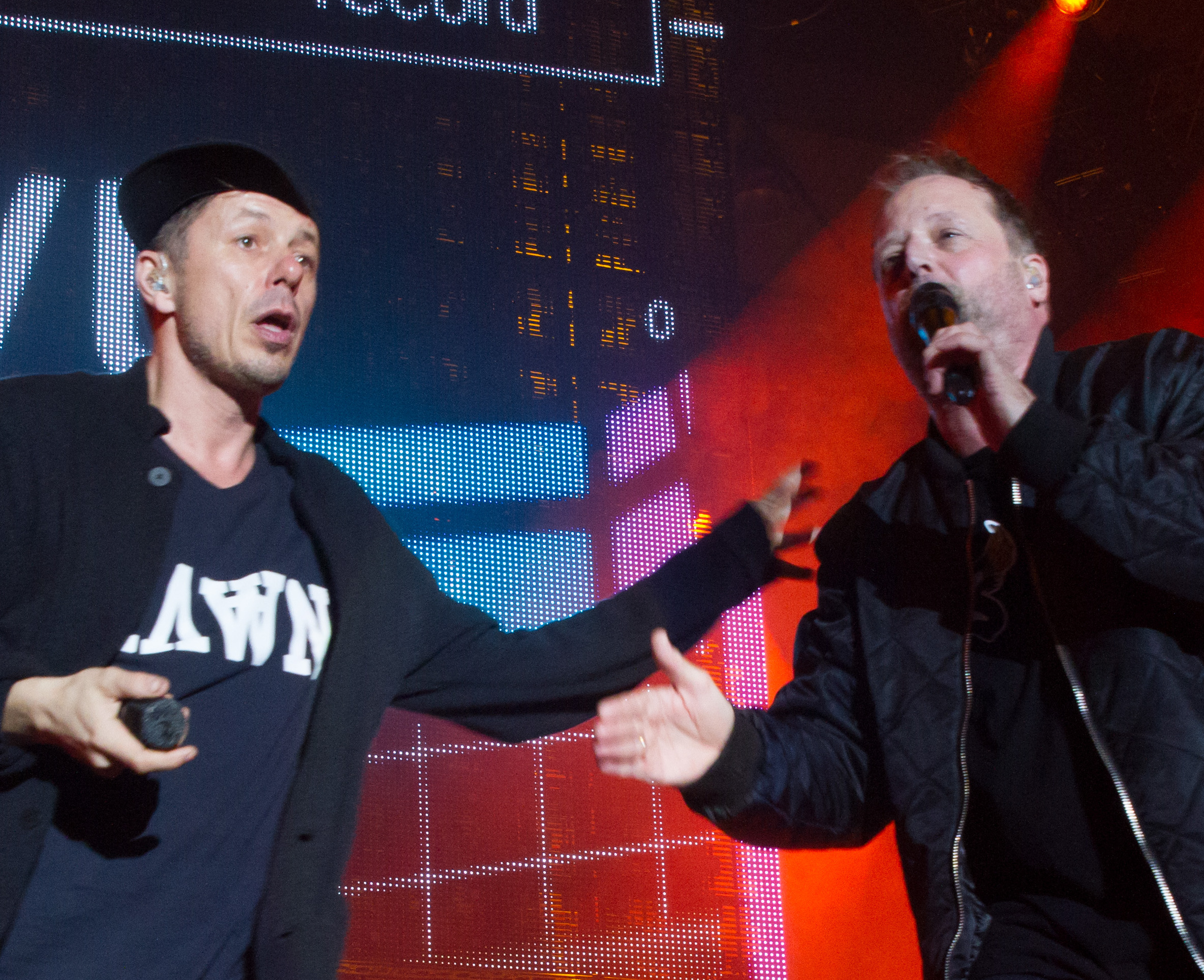
Michi & Smudo

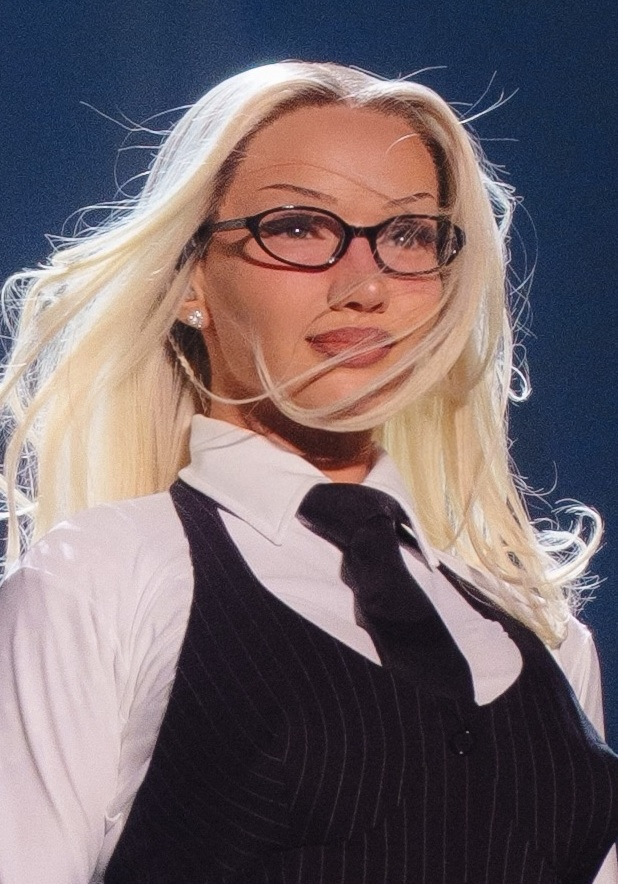
Shirin David

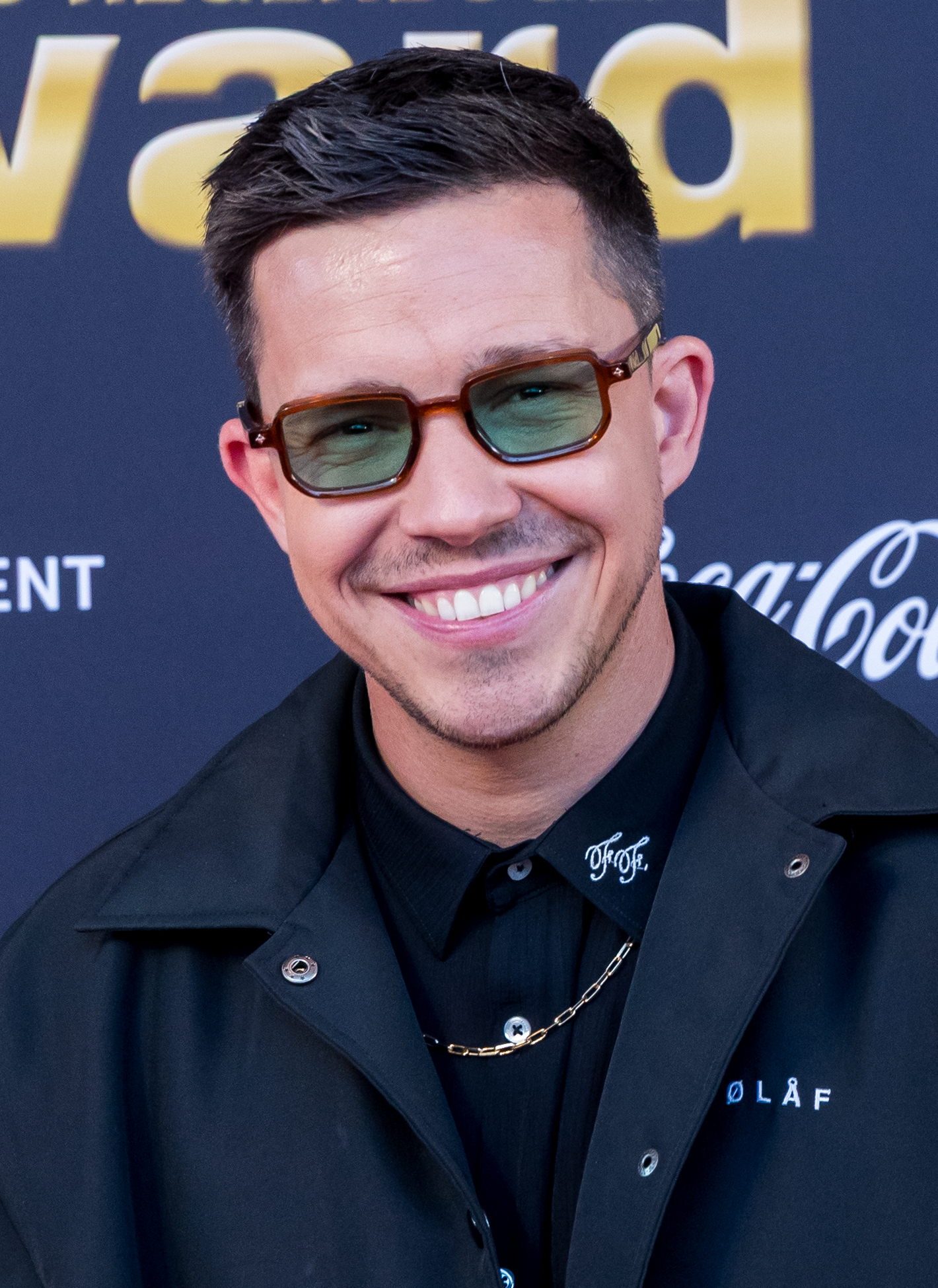
Nico Santos

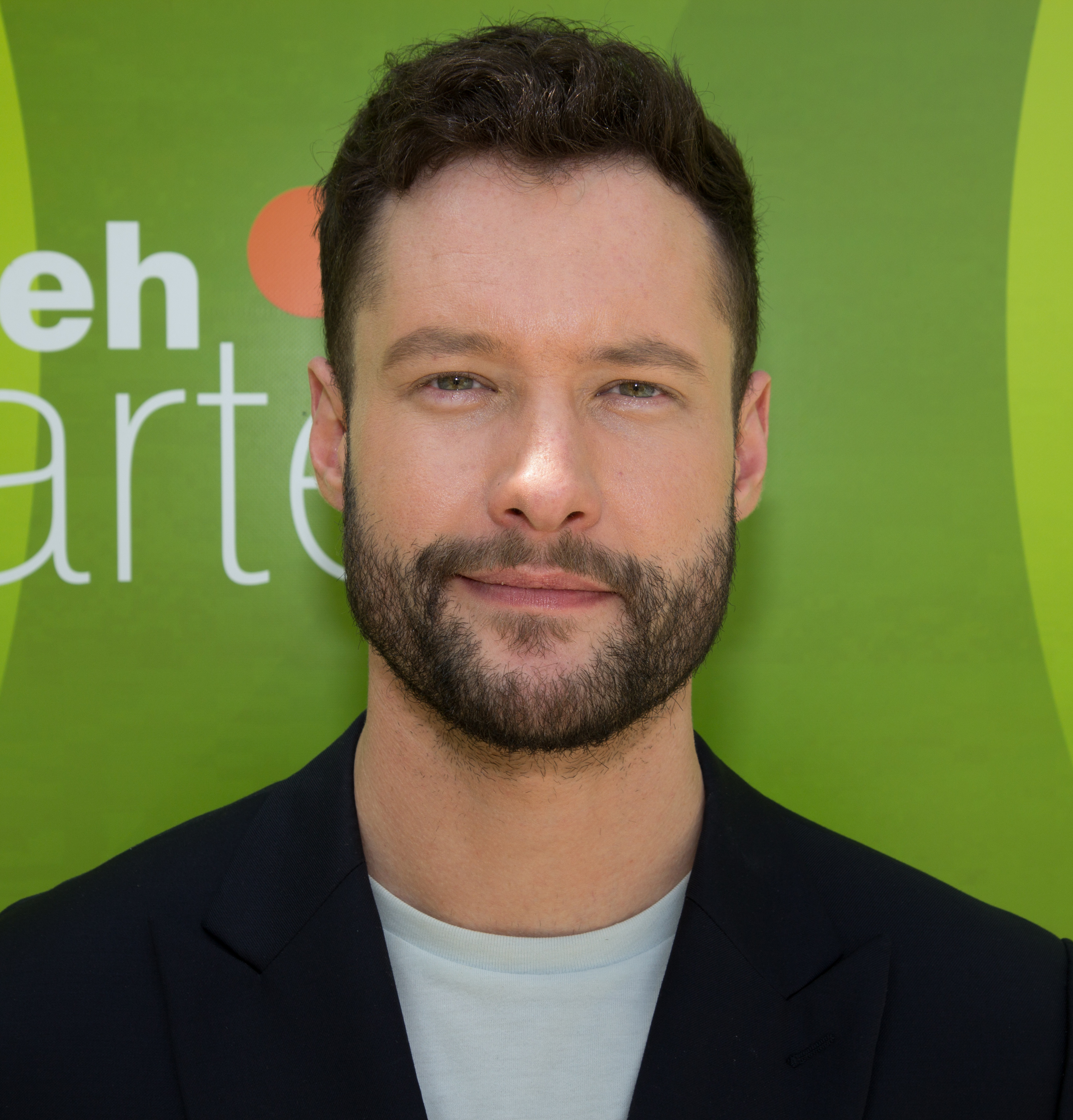
Calum Scott (Comeback Stage)

In April 2025, ProSieben and Sat.1 announced that all four coaches from the previous season; Mark Forster, Yvonne Catterfeld, Kamrad, and Samu Haber; would depart the panel for the upcoming fifteenth season. This marks the third season to have all coaches from the previous panel replaced, following season 13 and 14. On 20 April 2025, it was announced that previous coaches Rea Garvey, duo Michi & Smudo, Nico Santos, and Shirin David will return as coaches for their eighth, sixth, third, and second seasons, respectively.

On 19 August 2025, it was announced that Calum Scott would be featured as a coach for the "Comeback Stage", which was last present in season 11.

=== Hosts ===
Both Thore Schölermann and Melissa Khalaj returned as hosts from last season.

== Teams ==
Main Competition

- Winner
- Runner-up
- Third place
- Fourth place
- Fifth place
- Sixth place
- Seventh place
- Eliminated in the Semifinals
- Eliminated but selected to participate in Comeback Stage
- Eliminated in the Teamfights
- Eliminated in the Battle rounds

Comeback Stage

- Eliminated in the Live shows
- Eliminated in the third rounds
- Eliminated in the second rounds
- Eliminated in the first rounds

Coaching teams
Coaches	Top 76 Artists					
Rea Garvey						
Rea Garvey	Max Pesé	Andrea Galleti	Brunel Raherinandrasana	Cara Kienzle	Christian "Keule" Haas	Joy Krüger
Rea Garvey	Linus Bruhn	Luise Neubig	Trio ELBA	~~Tobias Dietzek~~	Alicia & David	Boysie White
Rea Garvey	John Cadelina	Julia Wolf	Ryan Bridge Madrid	Sarah Hübers	Viviana Milioti	
Michi & Smudo						
Michi & Smudo	Bernarda Brunović	Clifford Dwenger	Karl Frierson II	Lisa Asante	Amelie Fritz	Jazzy Gudd
Michi & Smudo	Lily MacKay	Samira Hofbauer	Simone Kotowski	Christopher Mathis	Denisa Allegra	Felix Hellwig
Michi & Smudo	Jermain Joewaia Burford	Kevin Scheiwiller	Marlon Ernst	Pascal Wulfes	Rita van Nek	
Shirin David						
Shirin David	Oxa	Vasco José Mano	Ereza	~~Denia Weber~~	~~Joelisa Serwah André~~	Dustin Lukat
Shirin David	Igor Santos Barbosa	Maël & Jonas	Maesra	~~Vincent Rinne~~	Daiana Vashakidze	Friedrich Häntzschel
Shirin David	Jasmine Lajeunesse	Kamai Karic	Manuël Stepanov	Marin Vrdoljak	Selina Yek	
Nico Santos						
Nico Santos	Anne Mosters	Greta Heimann	Marvin Tapper	Louk Jones	~~Lara Samira Will~~	~~Tina Ruseva~~
Nico Santos	Laura Kensy	Olena Slobodyska	Zeynep Avci	~~Sophia Brabetz~~	~~Rachel Leggio~~	Eugenie Moine
Nico Santos	Ikaros	Luciana Da Silva Alves	Marc Spitze	Nadia & Annika Schüler	Svenia Ribeiro	
Calum Scott						
Calum Scott	Joelisa Serwah André	Vincent Rinne	Lara Samira Will	Denia Weber	Tina Ruseva	Sophia Brabetz
Calum Scott	Rachel Leggio	Salvatore Tocco	Tobias Dietzek	Gwendolin Reinicke	Benedikt Froihofer	Aura Ray
Note: Italicized names are stolen artists that joined the Comeback Stage (names struck through within former teams). The underlined names are the "Comeback Stage" winners, who advanced to the Live shows.

== Blind Auditions ==
The Blind Auditions began broadcasting on 25 September 2025, and is broadcast every Thursday on ProSieben and every Friday on Sat.1. This season, the blocks returned, but with a twist. Unlike the previous seasons, each coach now only has two blocks that they can use to block another coach. However, they can choose to use the block at any time, even during their pitch. Only one block is allowed per audition; once a coach already used their block, the other coaches are not allowed to use their block. In addition, this season introduced the Joker. Each coach has a coin and is only allowed to use it once to try to further convince the artist to join their team. Each coach has seventeen spots to fill on their team, and, unlike last season, each coach filled their team. This is the second season in The Voice of Germany history where at least one coach (Shirin David in this case) does not have a one-chair turn on their team.

Like season 11 and season 13, the coaches perform separately in the first episode before the Blind Auditions, performing their own songs. Michi & Smudo performed "Aufhören", with Nico Santos joining them toward the conclusion of the song. Santos then opened his performance with "Play With Fire", with Rea Garvey joining him during the conclusion of the performance. Garvey then performed "The One". Shirin David performed last with "Bauch Beine Po".

Blind auditions color key
✔	Coach hit his/her "I WANT YOU" button
	Artist defaulted to this coach's team
	Artist elected to join this coach's team
	Artist was eliminated with no coach pressing their button
	Artist received an 'All Turn'.
	Coach used Joker on this artist
	Artist was eliminated, but got a second chance to compete in "Comeback Stage"
	Artist is an 'Allstar' contestant
✘	Coach pressed "I WANT YOU" button, but was blocked by another coach from getting the artist:
	Blocked by Rea; Blocked by Michi & Smudo; Blocked by Shirin; Blocked by Nico

Blind auditions results
Episode	Order	Artist	Age	Song	Coach's and artist's choices			
Episode	Order	Artist	Age	Song	Rea	Michi & Smudo	Shirin	Nico
Episode 1 (25 September)	1	Greta Heimann	20	"Eiserner Steg"	✔	✔	✘	✔
Episode 1 (25 September)	2	Ereza	21	"I Got You (I Feel Good)"	–	✔	✔	✔
Episode 1 (25 September)	3	Maël & Jonas	29 & 23	"I Swear to God"	✘^{1}	–	✔	✔
Episode 1 (25 September)	4	Nomi Rais	47	"I Wanna Dance with Somebody (Who Loves Me)"	–	–	–	–
Episode 1 (25 September)	5	Max Pesé	20	"Hallelujah I Love Her So"	✔	✔	✔	✔
Episode 1 (25 September)	6	Duo Schmidtreissend	56 & 49	"(Your Love Keeps Lifting Me) Higher and Higher"	–	–	–	–
Episode 1 (25 September)	7	Mabella	25	"Prisoner"	–	–	–	–
Episode 1 (25 September)	8	Lily MacKay	45	"Greatest Love of All"	–	✔	–	–
Episode 1 (25 September)	9	Christian "Keule" Haas	59	"You Shook Me All Night Long"	✔	✔	✔	✔
Episode 1 (25 September)	10	Friedrich Häntzschel	20	"Moodswings"	–	✔	✔	–
Episode 1 (25 September)	11	Shoger Panosyan	21	"Popular"	–	–	–	–
Episode 1 (25 September)	12	Vasco José Mano	28	"Stone Cold"	✔	✔	✔	✔
Episode 2 (26 September)	1	Daiana Vashakidze	30	"Toxic"	✔	✔	✔	✔
Episode 2 (26 September)	2	Selina Yek	35	"Hungriges Herz"	✔	✔	✔	✔
Episode 2 (26 September)	3	Florian Huber	23	"Dance with Somebody"	–	–	–	–
Episode 2 (26 September)	4	Joy Krüger	21	"Listen to Your Heart"	✔	–	–	✔
Episode 2 (26 September)	5	Johan Smits	64	"In the Ghetto"	–	–	–	–
Episode 2 (26 September)	6	EES	41	"Oliver Twist"	–	–	–	–
Episode 2 (26 September)	7	Anne Mosters	19	"Because of You"	✔	✔	✘	✔
Episode 2 (26 September)	8	Felix Hellwig	23	"Basket Case"	–	✔	–	–
Episode 2 (26 September)	9	Igor Santos Barbosa	28	"My Heart Will Go On"	✔	✔	✔	✔
Episode 2 (26 September)	10	Laura Kensy	25	"Wie du manchmal fehlst"	–	✔	✔	✔
Episode 2 (26 September)	11	Corrado La Rosa	45	"Più bella cosa"	–	–	–	–
Episode 2 (26 September)	12	Bernarda Brunović	32	"Fighter"	✔	✔	✔	✔
Episode 3 (2 October)	1	Tina Ruseva	20	"Do It like a Dude"	✘	✔	✔	✔
Episode 3 (2 October)	2	Linus Bruhn	26	"July"	✔	–	–	✘
Episode 3 (2 October)	3	Boysie White	66	"It's a Man's Man's Man's World"	✔	✔	✔	✔
Episode 3 (2 October)	4	Verena Zerbes	26	"Forget Me"	–	–	–	–
Episode 3 (2 October)	5	Jan Lichterfeld	27	"Piano Man"	–	–	–	–
Episode 3 (2 October)	6	Maesra	18	"Statement"	–	✔	✔^{2}	✔
Episode 3 (2 October)	7	Oxa	35	"Earth Song"	✔	✔	✔	✔
Episode 3 (2 October)	8	Brunel Raherinandrasana	35	"Soulman"	✔	✔	–	–
Episode 3 (2 October)	9	Mario Albers	34	"Ein Stern"	–	–	–	–
Episode 3 (2 October)	10	Joelisa Serwah André	23	"Pacify Her"	–	✔	✔	✔
Episode 3 (2 October)	11	Sinit Bezabeh	23	"Stadt"	–	–	–	–
Episode 3 (2 October)	12	Lisa Asante	25	"Let It Go"	✔	✔	✔	✔
Episode 3 (2 October)	13	Marvin Tapper	18	"September"	✔	–	–	✔
Episode 4 (3 October)	1	Karl Frierson II	57	"My Girl"	–	✔	–	✔
Episode 4 (3 October)	2	Deven Schulz	17	"Love in Portofino"	–	–	–	–
Episode 4 (3 October)	3	Svenia Ribeiro	31	"Sex on Fire"	✔	–	–	✔
Episode 4 (3 October)	4	Trio ELBA	30, 39 & 33	"Verbovaya Doshchechka"	✔	✔	✔	✔
Episode 4 (3 October)	5	Jazzy Gudd	35	"Ich hass dich"	–	✔	–	–
Episode 4 (3 October)	6	Luka Dakovic	28	"Too Sweet"	–	–	–	–
Episode 4 (3 October)	7	Vincent Rinne	20	"Meer"	✔	✔	✔	✘
Episode 4 (3 October)	8	Denisa Allegra	46	"I Will Survive"	–	✔	✔	✔
Episode 4 (3 October)	9	Flintsbacher Zwoagsang	28 & 33	"Weus'd a Herz hast wia a Bergwerk"	–	–	–	–
Episode 4 (3 October)	10	John Cadelina	36	"If You're Not the One"	✔	–	–	✔
Episode 4 (3 October)	11	Dustin Lukat	33	"Nur ein Wort"	–	✔	✔	–
Episode 4 (3 October)	12	Lara Samira Will	24	"Your Song"	✘	✔	✔	✔
Episode 5 (9 October)	1	Luciana Da Silva Alves	18	"No More Drama"	–	✔	–	✔
Episode 5 (9 October)	2	Antonio Calanna	34	"Left Outside Alone"	–	–	–	–
Episode 5 (9 October)	3	Viviana Milioti	28	"Who Wants To Live Forever"	✔	✔	✔	✔
Episode 5 (9 October)	4	Rita van Nek	76	"Sailing"	–	✔	–	✔
Episode 5 (9 October)	5	Marin Vrdoljak	29	"Lonely"	–	–	✔	✔
Episode 5 (9 October)	6	Judith Klingholz	22	"Pity Party"	–	–	–	–
Episode 5 (9 October)	7	Sarah Hübers	29	"Wieder genauso"	✔	✔	✔	✔
Episode 5 (9 October)	8	Tobias Dietzek	29	"The Final Countdown"	✔	✔	–	–
Episode 5 (9 October)	9	Denia Weber	23	"Heart of Stone"	✔	–	✔	✔
Episode 5 (9 October)	10	Aura Ray	23	"Good Luck, Babe!"	–	–	–	–
Episode 5 (9 October)	11	Christopher Mathis	31	"Ich laufe"	–	✔	–	–
Episode 5 (9 October)	12	Clifford Dwenger	32	"DNA"	–	✔	–	✔
Episode 6 (10 October)	1	Kamai Karic	18	"Diamonds Are a Girl's Best Friend"	✔	✔	✔	✔
Episode 6 (10 October)	2	Ikaros	23	"Something in the Orange"	✔	✔	–	✔
Episode 6 (10 October)	3	Alicia & David	27 & 25	"Fata Morgana"	✔	–	–	✔
Episode 6 (10 October)	4	Lars Hagen	49	"Die weißen Tauben sind müde"	–	–	–	–
Episode 6 (10 October)	5	Rachel Leggio	25	"A chi mi dice"	✔	✔	–	✔
Episode 6 (10 October)	6	Kevin Scheiwiller	33	"Little Lion Man"	–	✔	–	–
Episode 6 (10 October)	7	Nadia & Annika Schüler	22 & 52	"Nur kurz glücklich"	–	–	✔	✔
Episode 6 (10 October)	8	Dieter Adam	80	"My Way"	–	–	–	–
Episode 6 (10 October)	9	Tiziana Rose	25	"That's So True"	–	–	–	–
Episode 6 (10 October)	10	Marlon Ernst	27	"Was immer du willst"	–	✔	✔	✔
Episode 6 (10 October)	11	Louk Jones	33	"Crawling"	✔	–	–	✔
Episode 7^{3} (16 October)	1	Ryan Bridge Madrid	36	"Titanium"	✔	–	✔	✔
Episode 7^{3} (16 October)	2	Simone Kotowski	61	"(They Long to Be) Close to You"	✔	✔	–	–
Episode 7^{3} (16 October)	3	Aeneas Prepoudis	21	"Pompeii"	–	–	–	–
Episode 7^{3} (16 October)	4	Zeynep Avci	42	"Unutamam"	✔	–	✘	✔
Episode 7^{3} (16 October)	5	Julia Wolf	22	"Heartbreaker"	✔	✔	–	–
Episode 7^{3} (16 October)	6	Salvatore Tocco	20	"Birds of a Feather"	–	–	–	–
Episode 7^{3} (16 October)	7	Olena Slobodyska	30	"La Voix"	–	–	✔	✔
Episode 7^{3} (16 October)	8	Manuël Stepanov	23	"So Sick"	–	–	✔	✔
Episode 7^{3} (16 October)	9	Pascal Wulfes	29	"Jealous"	✔	✔	–	✔
Episode 7^{3} (16 October)	10	Gwendolin Reinicke	30	"True Colors"	–	–	–	–
Episode 7^{3} (16 October)	11	Sophia Brabetz	28	"Dynamite"	✔	✔	✔	✔
Episode 7^{3} (16 October)	12	Benedikt Froihofer	20	"Yesterday"	–	–	–	–
Episode 8 (17 October)	1	Luise Neubig	19	"Million Years Ago"	✔	–	✔	–
Episode 8 (17 October)	2	Neo Schneider	18	"Unikat"	–	–	–	–
Episode 8 (17 October)	3	Samira Hofbauer	37	"Anyone"	–	✔	–	✔
Episode 8 (17 October)	4	Miriam Schüler	29	"I'm So Excited"	–	–	–	–
Episode 8 (17 October)	5	Marc Spitze	27	"Best of You"	–	✔	–	✔
Episode 8 (17 October)	6	Jermain Joewaia Burford	35	"I Heard It Through the Grapevine"	–	✔	–	–
Episode 8 (17 October)	7	Anke Seiwald	44	"Für Frauen ist das kein Problem"	–	–	–	–
Episode 8 (17 October)	8	Andrea Galleti	31	"Rolling in the Deep"	✔	✔	–	–
Episode 8 (17 October)	9	Amelie Fritz	21	"It's a Lovely Day Today"	✔	✔	✔	✔
Episode 8 (17 October)	10	Marcos Dreher	50	"Baby Can I Hold You"	–	Team full	–	–
Episode 8 (17 October)	11	Cara Kienzle	23	"Hässlich"	✔	Team full	–	–
Episode 8 (17 October)	12	Jasmine Lajeunesse	38	"Kiss"	Team full	Team full	✔	✔
Episode 8 (17 October)	13	Eugenie Moine	21	"New Rules"	Team full	Team full	Team full	✔

- ^1 Nico unintentionally hit the Rea block button when leaning on his podium, nonetheless, the block remained.
- ^2 Michi & Smudo originally blocked Shirin, but after the performance they took it back and the block was removed making Shirin eligible to be picked
- ^3 During the episode, comeback stage coach Calum Scott surprised the coaches by performing his own song, "You Are the Reason", which earned him a four-chair turn.

== Battles ==
The Voice of Germany season 15 guest coaches

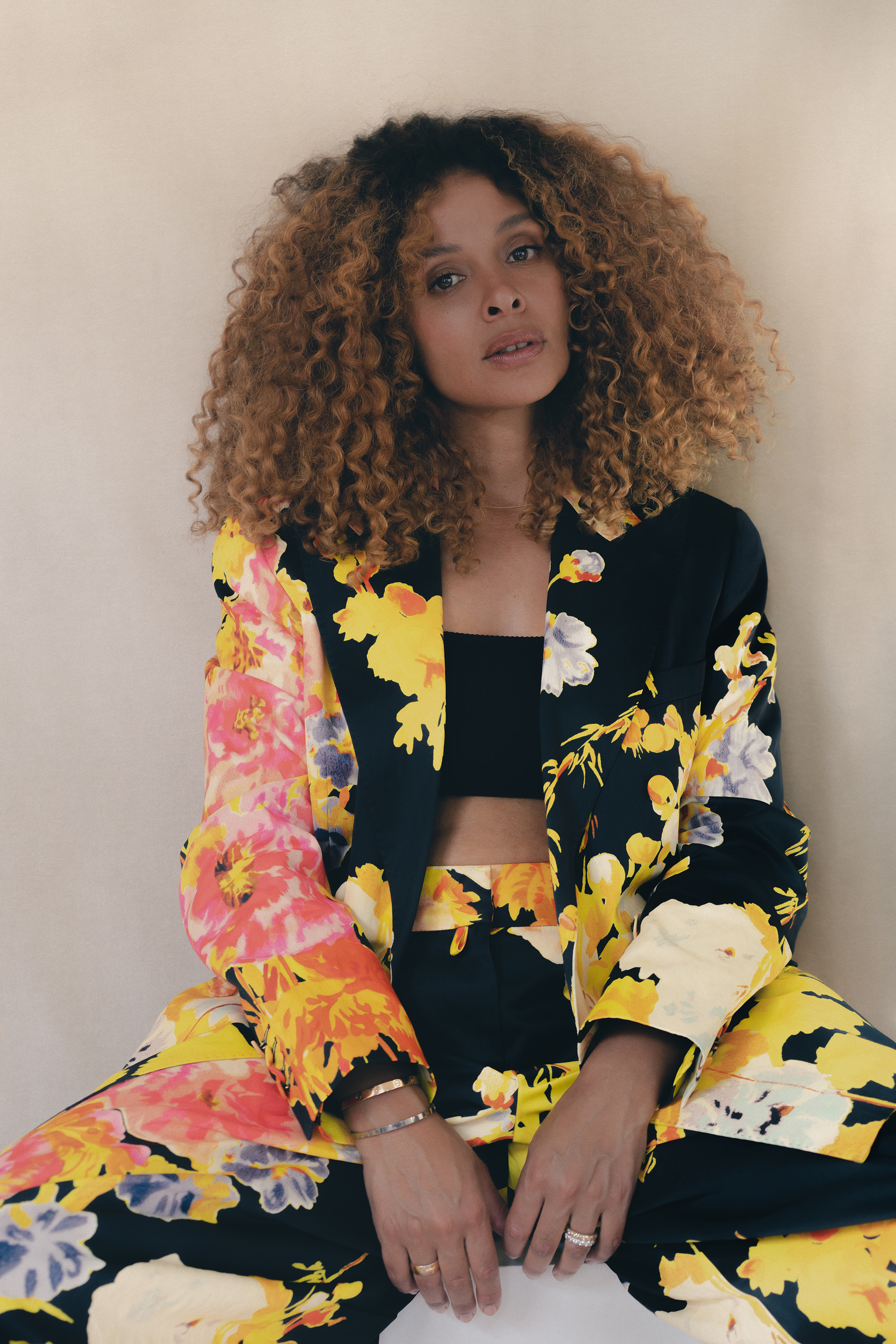
Joy Denalane

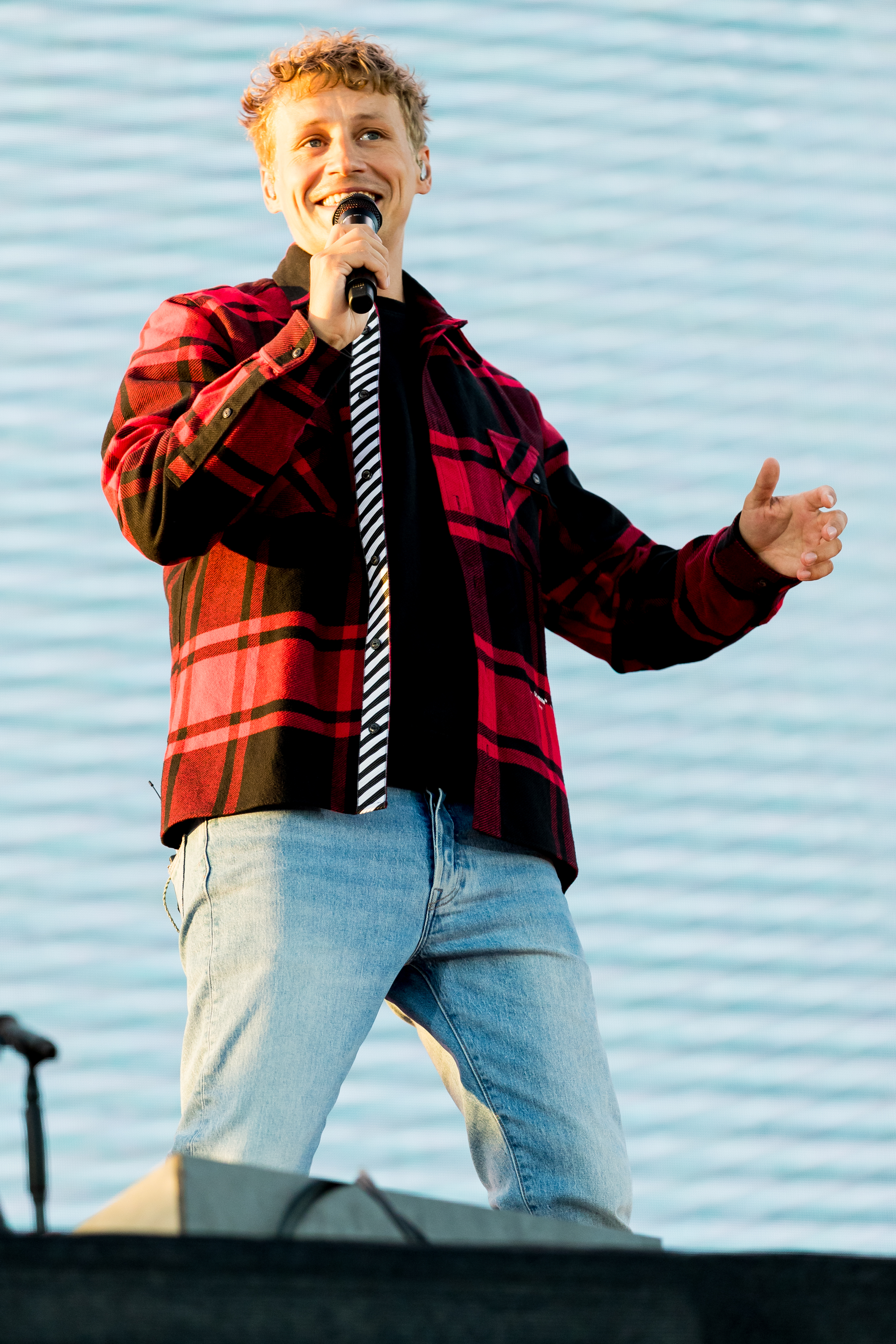
Tim Bendzko

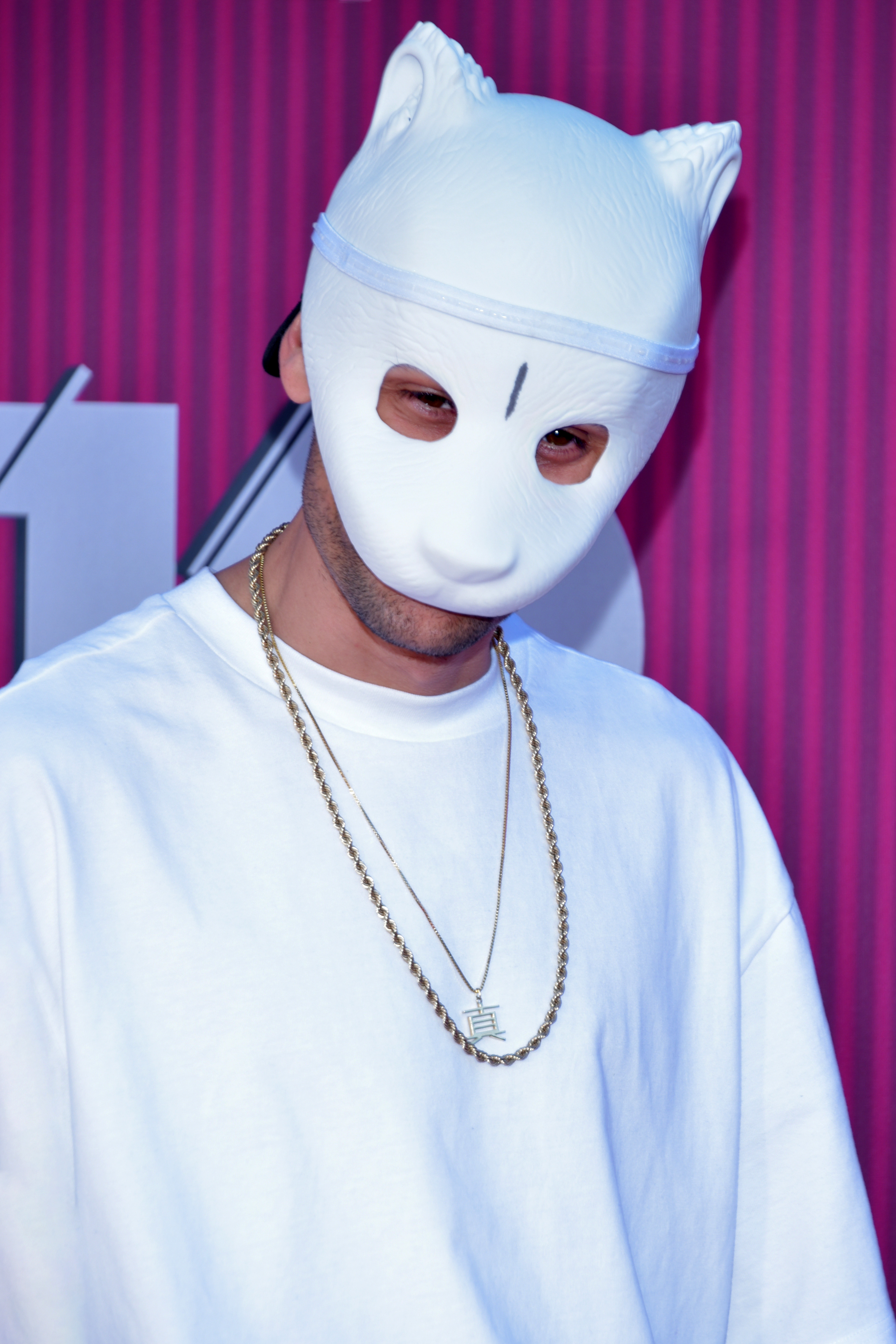
Cro

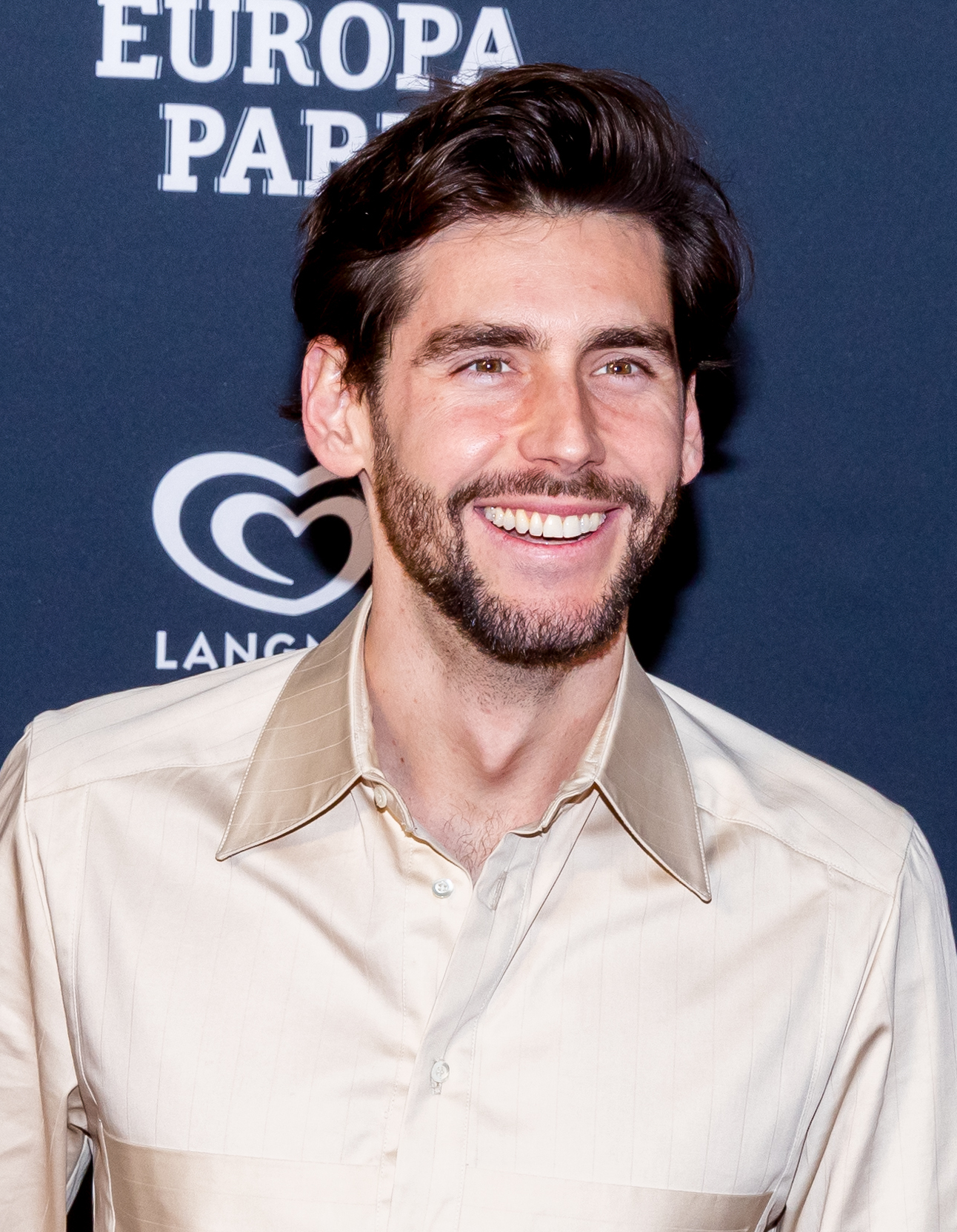
Álvaro Soler

The Battles began broadcasting on 23 October 2025, being broadcast on Thursday on ProSieben (first week only) and every Friday on Sat.1. Artists are divided into pairs (with each team having one trio due to having seventeen artists) to perform a song together. Each coach could select any number of candidates of each battle into the next phase, with each battle having one, multiple, or no winner. Each coach has nine artists on their team after the battles.

This season, a guest coach is present in each episode of the round: Joy Denalane for the first, Tim Bendzko for the second, Cro for the third, and Álvaro Soler for the fourth. In each respective episode, the guest coach awards one battle the "Battle of the Night" in terms of performance quality. The coach that has those artists on his/her team therefore gains an advantage in teamfights: the coach can block a challenging coach. The battle recipients of the awards were Joelisa Serwah André & Igor Santos Barbosa from Team Shirin, Oxa & Vasco José Mano from Team Shirin, Greta Heimann & Marvin Tapper from Team Nico, and Bernarda Brunović & Clifford Dwenger from Team Michi & Smudo.

Battle rounds color key
Artist won the Battle and advanced to the Teamfights
Artist lost the Battle and was eliminated
Artist lost the Battle, but got a second chance to compete in "Comeback Stage"
Battle was declared the "Battle of the Night" by that episode's guest coach

Episode	Coach	Order	Winner(s)	Song	Loser(s)
Episode 9 (23 October)	Rea	1	Joy Krüger	"Ordinary"	N/A
Episode 9 (23 October)	Rea	1	Linus Bruhn	"Ordinary"	N/A
Episode 9 (23 October)	Shirin	2	Maesra	"Du liebst mich nicht"	Selina Yek
Episode 9 (23 October)	Michi & Smudo	3	Lisa Asante	"Durch den Monsun"	N/A
Episode 9 (23 October)	Michi & Smudo	3	Jazzy Gudd	"Durch den Monsun"	N/A
Episode 9 (23 October)	Nico	4	Anne Mosters	"Redbone"	Rachel Leggio
Episode 9 (23 October)	Shirin	5	Joelisa Serwah André	"Creep"	N/A
Episode 9 (23 October)	Shirin	5	Igor Santos Barbosa	"Creep"	N/A
Episode 9 (23 October)	Michi & Smudo	6	Simone Kotowski	"You've Got a Friend"	Rita van Nek
Episode 9 (23 October)	Rea	7	Trio ELBA	"Teresa & Maria" / "Mon Amour"	N/A
Episode 9 (23 October)	Rea	7	Brunel Raherinandrasana	"Teresa & Maria" / "Mon Amour"	N/A
Episode 9 (23 October)	Nico	8	Tina Ruseva	"Walk This Way"	Eugenie Moine
Episode 9 (23 October)	Nico	8	Tina Ruseva	"Walk This Way"	Luciana Da Silva Alves
Episode 10 (24 October)	Rea	1	Max Pesé	"Lose Control "	Boysie White
Episode 10 (24 October)	Michi & Smudo	2	N/A	"Federleicht"	Christopher Mathis
Episode 10 (24 October)	Michi & Smudo	2	N/A	"Federleicht"	Marlon Ernst
Episode 10 (24 October)	Shirin	3	Vasco José Mano	"What About Us"	N/A
Episode 10 (24 October)	Shirin	3	Oxa	"What About Us"	N/A
Episode 10 (24 October)	Nico	4	Zeynep Avci	"Set Fire to the Rain"	N/A
Episode 10 (24 October)	Nico	4	Louk Jones	"Set Fire to the Rain"	N/A
Episode 10 (24 October)	Shirin	5	N/A	"Mirrors"	Manuël Stepanov
Episode 10 (24 October)	Shirin	5	N/A	"Mirrors"	Marin Vrdoljak
Episode 10 (24 October)	Nico	6	Olena Slobodyska	"Abracadabra"	Marc Spitze
Episode 10 (24 October)	Rea	7	Cara Kienzle	"Märchenwald"	Alicia & David
Episode 10 (24 October)	Michi & Smudo	8	Karl Frierson II	"I Wish"	Denisa Allegra
Episode 10 (24 October)	Michi & Smudo	8	Karl Frierson II	"I Wish"	Jermain Joewaia Burford
Episode 11 (31 October)	Rea	1	Christian "Keule" Haas	"Welcome to the Jungle"	Tobias Dietzek
Episode 11 (31 October)	Nico	2	Greta Heimann	"Beneath Your Beautiful"	N/A
Episode 11 (31 October)	Nico	2	Marvin Tapper	"Beneath Your Beautiful"	N/A
Episode 11 (31 October)	Shirin	3	Denia Weber	"Flashlight"	Daiana Vashakidze
Episode 11 (31 October)	Shirin	3	Denia Weber	"Flashlight"	Kamai Kapric
Episode 11 (31 October)	Michi & Smudo	4	Amelie Fritz	"Hotline Bling"	Pascal Wulfes
Episode 11 (31 October)	Shirin	5	Maël & Jonas	"Au Revoir"	N/A
Episode 11 (31 October)	Shirin	5	Dustin Lukat	"Au Revoir"	N/A
Episode 11 (31 October)	Rea	6	Luise Neubig	"Beifahrer"	Sarah Hübers
Episode 11 (31 October)	Michi & Smudo	7	Lily MacKay	"Die with a Smile"	N/A
Episode 11 (31 October)	Michi & Smudo	7	Samira Hofbauer	"Die with a Smile"	N/A
Episode 11 (31 October)	Nico	8	Lara Samira Will	"Jar of Hearts"	Sophia Brabetz
Episode 12 (7 November)	Rea^{4}	1	Andrea Galleti	"Are You Gonna Be My Girl"	Julia Wolf
Episode 12 (7 November)	Shirin	2	N/A	"Tau mich auf"	Friedrich Häntzschel
Episode 12 (7 November)	Shirin	2	N/A	"Tau mich auf"	Vincent Rinne
Episode 12 (7 November)	Rea^{4}	3	N/A	"Bridge Over Trouble Water"	Ryan Bridge Madrid
Episode 12 (7 November)	Rea^{4}	3	N/A	"Bridge Over Trouble Water"	Viviana Milioti
Episode 12 (7 November)	Rea^{4}	3	N/A	"Bridge Over Trouble Water"	John Cadeliña
Episode 12 (7 November)	Shirin	4	Ereza	"Crazy"	Jasmine Lajeunesse
Episode 12 (7 November)	Nico	5	N/A	"Just Give Me a Reason"	Ikaros
Episode 12 (7 November)	Nico	5	N/A	"Just Give Me a Reason"	Svenia Ribeiro
Episode 12 (7 November)	Michi & Smudo	6	N/A	"Hand in Hand"	Kevin Scheiwiller
Episode 12 (7 November)	Michi & Smudo	6	N/A	"Hand in Hand"	Felix Hellwig
Episode 12 (7 November)	Nico	7	Laura Kensy	"Gib mir Sonne"	Nadia & Annika Schüler
Episode 12 (7 November)	Michi & Smudo	8	Bernarda Brunović	"Freedom"	N/A
Episode 12 (7 November)	Michi & Smudo	8	Clifford Dwenger	"Freedom"	N/A

- ^4 Since Rea Garvey had already advanced eight talents to the Teamfights throughout battles 1–3, he only had one spot, but two battles left, therefore after his last battle, Andrea Galleti and Julia Wolf were called back on stage and Garvey picked one out of the five (Galleti, Wolf, Ryan Bridge Madrid, Viviana Milioti and John Cadeliña) to advance to the Teamfights.

== Teamfights ==
The teamfights were recorded on 6 and 7 July 2025. It began broadcasting only by Sat.1 on Friday nights starting 14 November 2025. In this stage of the competition, 12 artists appeared in each of three rounds. First, one artist per team sang and took a seat on one of four chairs called "hotseat". Once these seats were occupied, the next artist challenged one of the seated artists, and after the artists' performance, the studio audience decided who was allowed to take the seat. This process was repeated until all 12 had performed. The coach whose artists received the "Battle of the Night" awards in each episode of the battles gained the advantage of being able to block a challenger in this round; Shirin has two blocks to use, while Nico and Michi & Smudo have one each to use. At the end of each episode, the 4 artists seated at the end of each episode, from any team, advanced to the semi-final. A coach had the possibility to lose all of their artists, or bring all of their artists to the semi-finals. However, every coach was represented in the semi-finals and every coach did not bring their entire team to the semi-finals after this round.

Teamfights color key
Artist was seated and advanced to the live shows
Artist was not seated but got a second chance to compete in "Comeback Stage"
Artist was seated but was swapped and eliminated
Artist was not seated and was eliminated

Episode	Coach	Order	Artist	Song	Challenged Artist	Hotseat
Episode 13 (14 November)	Rea	1	Cara Kienzle	"A Thousand Years"	—N/a	Put in Hot-seat 1
Episode 13 (14 November)	Shirin	2	Ereza	"Ain't No Other Man"	—N/a	Put in Hot-seat 2
Episode 13 (14 November)	Nico	3	Louk Jones	"You've Got the Love"	—N/a	Put in Hot-seat 3
Episode 13 (14 November)	Michi & Smudo	4	Simone Kotowski	"Get Here"	—N/a	Put in Hot-seat 4
Episode 13 (14 November)	Rea	5	Brunel Raherinandrasana	"Clown"	Simone Kotowski	Put in Hot-seat 4
Episode 13 (14 November)	Shirin	6	Joelisa Serwah André	"Back to Black"	Louk Jones	Eliminated
Episode 13 (14 November)	Nico	7	Olena Slobodyska	"Trustfall"	Cara Kienzle	Eliminated
Episode 13 (14 November)	Michi & Smudo	8	Bernarda Brunović	"Rise Up"	Cara Kienzle	Put in Hot-seat 1
Episode 13 (14 November)	Rea	9	Andrea Galleti	"Power Over Me"	Ereza	Eliminated
Episode 13 (14 November)	Shirin	10	Maël & Jonas	"Teenage Dream"	Louk Jones	Eliminated
Episode 13 (14 November)	Nico	11	Greta Heimann	"Keiner ist wie du"	Brunel Raherinandrasana	Put in Hot-seat 4
Episode 13 (14 November)	Michi & Smudo	12	Samira Hofbauer	"I Don't Want to Miss a Thing"	Louk Jones	Eliminated
Episode 14 (21 November)	Nico	1	Zeynep Avci	"Can Kırıkları"	—N/a	Put in Hot-seat 1
Episode 14 (21 November)	Michi & Smudo	2	Amelie Fritz	"Messy"	—N/a	Put in Hot-seat 2
Episode 14 (21 November)	Shirin	3	Oxa	"Frozen"	—N/a	Put in Hot-seat 3
Episode 14 (21 November)	Rea	4	Trio ELBA	"Shum"	—N/a	Put in Hot-seat 4
Episode 14 (21 November)	Nico	5	Laura Kensy	"Unsicher"	Amelie Fritz	Eliminated
Episode 14 (21 November)	Michi & Smudo	6	Karl Frierson II	"It's Not Unusual"	Trio ELBA	Put in Hot-seat 4
Episode 14 (21 November)	Shirin	7	Dustin Lukat	"Whatever"	Amelie Fritz	Eliminated
Episode 14 (21 November)	Rea	8	Max Pesé	"Feeling Good"	Amelie Fritz	Put in Hot-seat 2
Episode 14 (21 November)	Nico	9	Tina Ruseva	"Killing Me Softly with His Song"	Karl Frierson II	Eliminated
Episode 14 (21 November)	Michi & Smudo	10	Lisa Asante	"The Emptiness Machine"	Zeynep Avci	Put in Hot-seat 1
Episode 14 (21 November)	Shirin	11	Igor Santos Barbosa	"Die for You"	Lisa Asante	Eliminated
Episode 14 (21 November)	Rea	12	Joy Krüger	"Scars to Your Beautiful"	Karl Frierson II	Eliminated
Episode 15 (28 November)	Nico	1	Marvin Tapper	"Mercy"	—N/a	Put in Hot-seat 1
Episode 15 (28 November)	Shirin	2	Denia Weber	"The Wizard and I"	—N/a	Put in Hot-seat 2
Episode 15 (28 November)	Michi & Smudo	3	Lily MacKay	"Don't Stop Believin'"	—N/a	Put in Hot-seat 3
Episode 15 (28 November)	Rea	4	Christian "Keule" Haas	"Highway to Hell"	—N/a	Put in Hot-seat 4
Episode 15 (28 November)	Nico	5	Lara Samira Will	"Can You Feel the Love Tonight"	Lily MacKay	Put in Hot-seat 3
Episode 15 (28 November)	Shirin	6	Vasco José Mano	"Runnin' (Lose It All)"	Christian "Keule" Haas	Put in Hot-seat 4
Episode 15 (28 November)	Michi & Smudo	7	Jazzy Gudd	"Der letzte Song (Alles wird gut)"	Lara Samira Will	Eliminated
Episode 15 (28 November)	Rea	8	Luise Neubig	"Wildest Dreams"	Marvin Tapper	Eliminated
Episode 15 (28 November)	Nico	9	Anne Mosters	"Human"	Denia Weber	Put in Hot-seat 2
Episode 15 (28 November)	Shirin	10	Maesra	"Lieben wir"	Marvin Tapper	Eliminated
Episode 15 (28 November)	Michi & Smudo	11	Clifford Dwenger	"'Till I Collapse"	Lara Samira Will	Put in Hot-seat 3
Episode 15 (28 November)	Rea	12	Linus Bruhn	"Bad Habits"	Marvin Tapper	Eliminated

Detailed chairs' changes
Episode	Order	Hotseat 1	Hotseat 2	Hotseat 3	Hotseat 4
Episode 13	4	Cara Kienzle	Ereza	Louk Jones	Simone Kotowski
Episode 13	5	Cara Kienzle	Ereza	Louk Jones	Brunel Raherinandrasana
Episode 13	6	Cara Kienzle	Ereza	Louk Jones	Brunel Raherinandrasana
Episode 13	7	Cara Kienzle	Ereza	Louk Jones	Brunel Raherinandrasana
Episode 13	8	Bernarda Brunović	Ereza	Louk Jones	Brunel Raherinandrasana
Episode 13	9	Bernarda Brunović	Ereza	Louk Jones	Brunel Raherinandrasana
Episode 13	10	Bernarda Brunović	Ereza	Louk Jones	Brunel Raherinandrasana
Episode 13	11	Bernarda Brunović	Ereza	Louk Jones	Greta Heimann
Episode 13	12	Bernarda Brunović	Ereza	Louk Jones	Greta Heimann
Episode 14	4	Zeynep Avci	Amelie Fritz	Oxa	Trio ELBA
Episode 14	5	Zeynep Avci	Amelie Fritz	Oxa	Trio ELBA
Episode 14	6	Zeynep Avci	Amelie Fritz	Oxa	Karl Frierson II
Episode 14	7	Zeynep Avci	Amelie Fritz	Oxa	Karl Frierson II
Episode 14	8	Zeynep Avci	Max Pesé	Oxa	Karl Frierson II
Episode 14	9	Zeynep Avci	Max Pesé	Oxa	Karl Frierson II
Episode 14	10	Lisa Asante	Max Pesé	Oxa	Karl Frierson II
Episode 14	11	Lisa Asante	Max Pesé	Oxa	Karl Frierson II
Episode 14	12	Lisa Asante	Max Pesé	Oxa	Karl Frierson II
Episode 15	4	Marvin Tapper	Denia Weber	Lily MacKay	Christian "Keule" Haas
Episode 15	5	Marvin Tapper	Denia Weber	Lara Samira Will	Christian "Keule" Haas
Episode 15	6	Marvin Tapper	Denia Weber	Lara Samira Will	Vasco José Mano
Episode 15	7	Marvin Tapper	Denia Weber	Lara Samira Will	Vasco José Mano
Episode 15	8	Marvin Tapper	Denia Weber	Lara Samira Will	Vasco José Mano
Episode 15	9	Marvin Tapper	Anne Mosters	Lara Samira Will	Vasco José Mano
Episode 15	10	Marvin Tapper	Anne Mosters	Lara Samira Will	Vasco José Mano
Episode 15	11	Marvin Tapper	Anne Mosters	Clifford Dwenger	Vasco José Mano
Episode 15	12	Marvin Tapper	Anne Mosters	Clifford Dwenger	Vasco José Mano

== Comeback Stage ==
This season's fifth coach, Calum Scott, selected artists who did not make a team during the blind auditions, as well as eliminated artists from later rounds of the competition, thus creating new rounds to The Voice: Comeback Stage by SEAT. The two winners compete in the live shows against the talents of the main coaches (Garvey, Michi & Smudo, David, and Santos), singing for a chance to win the fifteenth season of The Voice of Germany.

Comeback Stage color key
Artist was immediately eliminated after not being seated
Artist lost their seat and was eliminated
Artist was seated, or remained in their seat, and advanced to the next round
Artist won The Comeback Stage and advanced to the Live shows

=== First Round ===
During the first round of competition, the four selected artists from Blind auditions went head to head, Scott selected two artists to sit in the Hot-Seats and compete against other artists that were eliminated in the Battles.

First Comeback Stage results
Episode	Coach	Order	Artist	Song	Challenged / Replaced Artist	Hot-Seat
Episode 7 (16 October)	Calum Scott	1	Aura Ray	"Blowin' in the Wind"	—N/a	Put in Hot-seat 1
Episode 7 (16 October)	Calum Scott	2	Benedikt Froihofer	"She's Always A Woman"	—N/a	Put in Hot-seat 2
Episode 7 (16 October)	Calum Scott	3	Gwendolin Reinicke	"What Is Love"	Aura Ray	Put in Hot-seat 2
Episode 7 (16 October)	Calum Scott	4	Salvatore Tocco	"A Little Bit Yours"	Benedikt Froihofer	Put in Hot-seat 1

Detailed chairs' changes – Round One
Episode	Order	Hotseat 1	Hotseat 2
Episode 7	1	Aura Ray	Benedikt Froihofer
Episode 7	2	Salvatore Tocco	Gwendolin Reinicke

=== Second Round ===
During the second round, Scott was to choose four losing talents, in the battle rounds to challenge the existing hot-seats.

Second Comeback Stage results
Episode	Coach	Order	Artist	Song	Challenged / Replaced Artist	Song	Hot-Seat
Episode 9 (23 October)	Calum Scott	1	Rachel Leggio	"Impossible"	Gwendolin Reinicke	"She Used to Be Mine"	Put in Hot-Seat 2
Episode 11 (31 October)	Calum Scott	2	Tobias Dietzek	"The Kill"	Salvatore Tocco	"Somewhere Only We Know"	Eliminated
Episode 12 (7 November)	Calum Scott	3	Sophia Brabetz	"I Miss You, I'm Sorry"	Rachel Leggio	—N/a	Put in Hot-Seat 2
Episode 12 (7 November)	Calum Scott	4	Vincent Rinne	"Break My Heart Again"	Salvatore Tocco	—N/a	Put in Hot-Seat 1

Detailed chairs' changes – Round Two
Episode	Order	Hotseat 1	Hotseat 2
Episodes 9, 11 & 12	1	Salvatore Tocco	Gwendolin Reinicke
Episodes 9, 11 & 12	2	Salvatore Tocco	Rachel Leggio
Episodes 9, 11 & 12	3	Vincent Rinne	Sophia Brabetz

=== Third Round ===
In the third round, Scott chose losing talents from the teamfights to battle the current hot-seats.

At the end of this round, he chose two artists to advance to the Semi-Final of the main competition.

Third Comeback Stage results
Episode	Coach	Order	Artist	Song	Challenged / Replaced Artist	Song	Hot-Seat
Episode 13 (14 November)	Calum Scott	1	Joelisa Serwah André	"Love in the Dark"	Sophia Brabetz	"Soulmate"	Put in Hot-Seat 2
Episode 14 (21 November)	Calum Scott	2	Tina Ruseva	"The Door"	Vincent Rinne	"Falling"	Eliminated
Episode 15 (28 November)	Calum Scott	1	Lara Samira Will	"Naked"	—N/a		Eliminated
Episode 15 (28 November)	Calum Scott	2	Denia Weber	"Flowers"	—N/a		Eliminated

Detailed chairs' changes – Round Three
Episode	Order	Hotseat 1	Hotseat 2
Episode 13	1	Vincent Rinne	Sophia Brabetz
Episode 14	2	Vincent Rinne	Joelisa Serwah André
Episode 15	3	Vincent Rinne	Joelisa Serwah André

== Semi-final ==
The semi-final aired on 5 December. Seven artists out of the fourteen in the round progressed to the final, regardless of team. All decisions are made by television viewers via televoting. Due to the teamfights round prior to the semi-finals, this season is the third to feature an uneven amount of artists from each team entering the semi-finals: Team Nico and Team Michi & Smudo have four artists each, Team Shirin has three artists, and Team Rea has one artist. Team Calum joined the main competition this round, bringing two artists from the Comeback Stage to the semi-final.

Due to votes being solely for the artist, it was not guaranteed that each coach would be represented in the finale. However, all four main coaches (Garvey, Michi & Smudo, David, and Santos) successfully brought their team to the finale. Nico Santos, with the advancements of Anne Mosters, Greta Heimann, and Marvin Tapper, became the first coach in the history of the show to have three finalists represent them in the final. Shirin David, with the advancements of Vasco José Mano and Oxa, became the fifth coach; after Samu Haber, Andreas Bourani, Ronan Keating, and Mark Forster; to bring two artists to the final. David has the distinction of being the first female coach in the history of the show to accomplish this.

With the eliminations of Joelisa Serwah André and Vincent Rinne, Calum Scott no longer has any artists on his team, marking the first time a Comeback Stage coach is not represented in the finale. However, this season was the first in which a Comeback Stage coach was not guaranteed an artist in the finale.

Semi-final color key
Artist was advanced to the finale from the public's vote
Artist was eliminated

Semi-final results
Order	Coach	Artist	Song	Result
1	Shirin	Vasco José Mano	"Fix You"	Advanced
2	Nico	Marvin Tapper	"Hold Me While You Wait"	Advanced
3	Michi & Smudo	Lisa Asante	"Breaking the Habit"	Eliminated
4	Calum	Joelisa Serwah André	"Say Something"	Eliminated
5	Rea	Max Pesé	"Cry Me a River"	Advanced
6	Nico	Greta Heimann	"Cello"	Advanced
7	Shirin	Ereza	"All I Ask"	Eliminated
8	Michi & Smudo	Clifford Dwenger	"Stand Up"	Eliminated
9	Nico	Anne Mosters	"I'll Never Love Again"	Advanced
10	Shirin	Oxa	"What's Up?"	Advanced
11	Calum	Vincent Rinne	"Egoist"	Eliminated
12	Michi & Smudo	Karl Frierson II	"Soul Man"	Eliminated
13	Nico	Louk Jones	"Running Up That Hill"	Eliminated
14	Michi & Smudo	Bernarda Brunović	"Writing's on the Wall"	Advanced

== Finale ==
The finale aired on 12 December. This season featured seven finalists, being the first version to do so, who competed for the public's vote to be declared the winner of the season. Each finalist sings an original song and a duet with their coach.

During the episode, Comeback Stage coach Calum Scott performed "I Wanna Dance with Somebody" with Whitney Houston's vocals in a duet. Additionally, Michael Patrick Kelly performed "Run Free" with the finalists prior to the results being announced.

Anne Mosters from Team Nico was named the winner at the end of the episode, marking Nico Santos' first win as a coach. Mosters became the first "All Star" contestant to win a season in the show's history. Her margin of victory, 1,58%, was the closest in the show's history.

Coach	Artist	Order	Original Song	Order	Duet Song (with coach)	Voting	Result
Nico Santos	Marvin Tapper	1	"How Can I Be So Stupid"	10	"How Will I Know"	7,95%	Seventh place
Rea Garvey	Max Pesé	11	"Sweet Goodbye"	2	"Beggin'"	23,31%	Runner-up
Nico Santos	Anne Mosters	3	"Gravity"	10	"How Will I Know"	24,89%	Winner
Shirin David	Vasco José Mano	7	"Something About You"	4	"Man's World" / "It's a Man's Man's Man's World"	9,28%	Sixth place
Shirin David	Oxa	9	"Set Me Free"	4	"Man's World" / "It's a Man's Man's Man's World"	10,53%	Fifth place
Michi & Smudo	Bernarda Brunović	5	"The Rain"	8	"I Want You Back" / "Wie Weit"	11,36%	Fourth place
Nico Santos	Greta Heimann	6	"Fliegen"	10	"How Will I Know"	12,66%	Third place

== Elimination Chart ==
Coaches color key

- Artist from Team Rea
- Artist from Team Michi & Smudo
- Artist from Team Shirin
- Artist from Team Nico
- Artist from Team Calum

Results color key

- Winner
- Runner-up
- Third place
- Fourth place
- Fifth place
- Sixth place
- Seventh place
- Artist was saved by the public vote
- Artist was eliminated

Overall Results
Artist	Week 1 Semi-Final	Week 2 Final
Anne Mosters	Safe	Winner
Max Pesé	Safe	Runner-up
Greta Heimann	Safe	Third place
Bernarda Brunović	Safe	Fourth place
Oxa	Safe	Fifth place
Vasco José Mano	Safe	Sixth place
Marvin Tapper	Safe	Seventh place
Joelisa Serwah André	Eliminated	Eliminated (Semi-Final)
Lisa Asante	Eliminated	Eliminated (Semi-Final)
Clifford Dwenger	Eliminated	Eliminated (Semi-Final)
Ereza	Eliminated	Eliminated (Semi-Final)
Karl Frierson II	Eliminated	Eliminated (Semi-Final)
Louk Jones	Eliminated	Eliminated (Semi-Final)
Vincent Rinne	Eliminated	Eliminated (Semi-Final)

== Contestants who appeared on other TV shows or previous seasons ==
=== Other TV shows ===
- Igor Santos Barbosa was a contestant in the 13th season of "Deutschland sucht den Superstar" in 2016, where he was eliminated in the Semi-Finals and came in 5th place.
- Manuël Stepanov was a contestant in the 18th season of "Deutschland sucht den Superstar" in 2021, where he did not reach the Recall.
- Eugenie Moine was a contestant in the 11th season of The Voice Belgique in 2024. She was a member of Hatik's team and was eliminated in the Duels.
- Viviana Milioti was a contestant and competed as a "Herausforderer" in the 14th season of "Deutschland sucht den Superstar" in 2017, where she was eliminated in the recall finale in Dubai and placed 19th/20th.

=== Allstar contestants ===
- Maël & Jonas competed in the tenth season as part of Nico Santos' team and finished in third place.
- Christian Haas competed in the ninth season as part of Rea Garvey's team and was eliminated in the Sing-Offs.
- Anne Mosters competed in the thirteenth season as part of Ronan Keating's team and was eliminated in the Teamfights.
- Bernarda Brunović competed in the eighth season as part of Michael Patrick Kelly's team and was eliminated in the Semi-Finals.
- Linus Bruhn competed in the fifth season as part of Stefanie Kloß' team and was eliminated in the Knockouts.
- Oxa competed in the ninth season as part of Mark Forster's team and was eliminated in the Semi-Finals.
- Jazzy Gudd competed in the fifth season as part of Michi & Smudo's team and was eliminated in the Knockouts.
- Lara Samira Will competed in the seventh season as part of Samu Haber's team and was eliminated in the Semi-Finals.
- Clifford Dwenger competed in the eighth season as part of Michi & Smudo's team and was eliminated in the Semi-Finals.
- Louk Jones competed, as Louisa Jones, in the sixth season as part of Samu Haber's team and was eliminated in the Battle rounds.
- Zeynep Avci competed in the eleventh season as part of Johannes Oerding's team and was eliminated in the Quarter-Finals.
- Samira Hofbauer competed in the second season as part of Nena's team, in the duo Sami & Samira, and was eliminated in the Live shows.
