= Oxa (musician) =

Brazilian singer

- Born: Cleiton Jose Sia; Brazil
- Occupations: Singer, actor, performer
- Instrument: Vocals
- Years active: 2011–present
- Website: oxaofficial.de

Oxa (born 1989), is a Brazilian musical actress, dancer, and singer currently based in Germany. Known for their unique stage presence and dynamic stage production, Oxa has appeared in several television shows as both a dancer and a singer.

== Early and personal life ==
According to their own account, Oxa grew up as a foster and adopted child on a farm in Taquarituba, about 300 kilometers from the Brazilian city of São Paulo. As a dancer, they performed classical ballet, modern dance, hip-hop, Latin and acrobatics. Oxa has been living and working in Germany since 2015.

In 2019, Oxa stated that they were genderfluid, using they/them pronouns. They state "I am a man, I am a woman, I am transgender, I am a performer, dancer and singer!".

== Career ==
=== Musicals ===
Oxa appeared as singer and dancer in the following musicals, since 2022 under the stage name Oxa:

- 2013: O Rei Leão (The Lion King) in Brazil
- 2015: Tarzan in Stuttgart, Germany
- 2016–2017: Tarzan as Terk in Oberhausen, Germany
- 2017–2018: Kinky Boots as Angel, Referee (In This Corner), and Cover for Lola in Hamburg, Germany
- 2018: Tina – The Tina Turner Musical in Germany
- 2019-2020: West Side Story as Chino in Nuremberg, Germany
- 2022: Moulin Rouge as Baby Doll in Cologne, Germany
- since December 2024: MJ the Musical as alternate for the main character, Michael Jackson

=== Various television appearances and competition participations ===
In 2011, Oxa took second place on the Brazilian television dance show Se Ela Dança, Eu Danço, a spinoff of the show So You Think You Can Dance. The following year, Sia won the national dance competition ¡Q'Viva!: The Chosen and then performed as a background dancer for Jennifer Lopez in Las Vegas for six months.

As Oxa, Oxa appeared at the party series Animal Zircuz on the Reeperbahn in Hamburg in 2018.

In January 2019, Oxa won the annual young talent competition of the Hamburg Travestietheater Pulverfass Cabaret.

In 2021, Oxa was a co-writer of the Cypriot entry for the Eurovision Song Contest 2021 on the song "El Diablo".

==== The Voice of Germany ====
As Oxa, they auditioned for the ninth season of the reality competition show The Voice of Germany. They performed Netta's "Toy" in the first phase of the show. Of the show's four coaches, only Mark Forster expressed interest in working with Oxa. Oxa made it to the semi-final where they lost a place to fellow Team Mark member Fidi Steinbeck in the final of the show.

Performances on The Voice of Germany 2019
Round	Song	Original artist	Original air date	Result
Blind Auditions	"Toy"	Netta Barzilai	19 September 2019	Mark Forster turned; defaulted to Team Mark.
Battles	"Don't Stop Me Now" (vs. Sabina Noronha)	Queen	24 October 2019	Saved by Mark Forster
Sing offs	"Born This Way"	Lady Gaga	27 October 2019	Saved by Mark Forster
Semi-final (Top 10)	"I'm Still Standing"	Elton John	3 November 2019	Eliminated

In 2025, Oxa returned to the fifteenth season of The Voice of Germany as an "All Star". In the blind auditions phase of the show, they performed "Earth Song" by Michael Jackson. All four coaches (Rea Garvey, Michi & Smudo, Shirin David, and Nico Santos) expressed interest in working with Oxa. Ultimately, Oxa chose to join Team Shirin and finished in fifth place. In the final, Oxa performed their new original song, "Set Me Free".

Performances on The Voice of Germany 2025
Round	Song	Original artist	Original air date	Result
Blind Auditions	"Earth Song"	Michael Jackson	2 October 2025	Rea Garvey, Michi & Smudo, Shirin David, and Nico Santos turned; elected to join Team Shirin.
Battles	"What About Us" (vs. Vasco José Mano)	Pink	24 October 2025	Saved by Shirin David
Teamfights	"Frozen"	Madonna	21 November 2025	Saved by studio audience
Semi-final (Top 14)	"What's Up?"	4 Non Blondes	5 December 2025	Through to grand final
Final (Top 7)	"Set Me Free"	Cleiton Sia (Oxa)	12 December 2025	Fifth place
Final (Top 7)	"Man's World" / "It's a Man's Man's Man's World" (with Shirin David and Vasco José Mano)	James Brown	12 December 2025	Fifth place

== Discography ==
=== Singles ===
- "Bixa" – 2020
- "It's Okay" – 2020
- "Amor Com Você" – 2020
- "Sientate" – 2021
- "Não Tenta" – 2022
- "Bate Cabelo pela Paz" – 2022
- "MINHA BRISA" – 2022
- "Onipresente" – 2024
- "True to Yourself" – 2025
- "Outcast" – 2025
- "Set Me Free" – 2025
- "Bad Behavior" – 2026
