= Michi Beck =

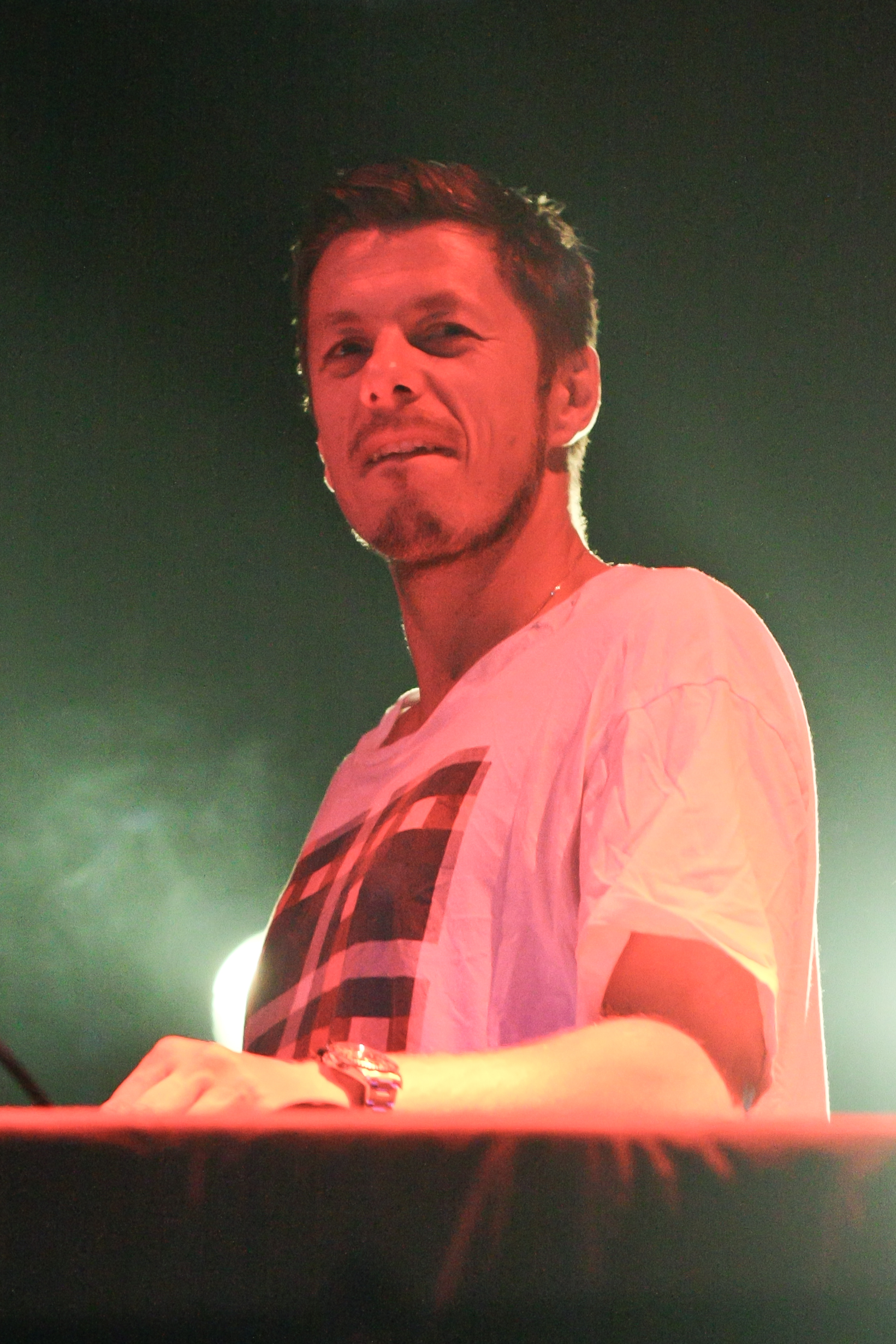
- Beck in 2010

Background information
- Birth name: Michael Beck
- Also known as: Dee Jot Hausmarke; Hausmarke; King Burger B.
- Born: 11 December 1967 (age 57); Stuttgart, West Germany
- Genres: German hip hop
- Instrument: Vocals
- Years active: 1986–present
- Labels: Four Music

Michael "Michi" Beck (born 11 December 1967), also known by his pseudonym as the disc jockey Dee Jot Hausmarke, is a member of the German hip hop group Die Fantastischen Vier where he acts as DJ and MC. He also forms the duo Turntablerocker, with Thomas Burchia.

== Solo career ==
Beck produced his first solo album Weltweit ("Worldwide") with Thomilla in the Benztown Studios Stuttgart in 1998. The album features German rappers like Afrob, Max Herre and MC Rene alongside international artists, most notably Wyclef Jean, Melle Mel and Scorpio. Three singles from Weltweit were released: "Mädchen No 1", "Turntablerocker (Beweg Deinen Popo)" featuring Max Herre and "Für immer", featuring Yvette Michelle.
