= The Voice Kids (German TV series) =

German television program

- Genre: Reality television
- Created by: John de Mol Jr.
- Presented by: Thore Schölermann; Chantal Janzen; Debbie Schippers; Melissa Khalaj
- Judges: Lena Meyer-Landrut; Tim Bendzko; Henning Wehland; Johannes Strate; Mark Forster; Sasha Schmitz; Nena & Larissa Kerner; Max Giesinger; The BossHoss; Stefanie Kloß; Deine Freunde; Álvaro Soler; Wincent Weiss; Michi Beck & Smudo; Ayliva; Clueso; Leony; Michael Patrick Kelly; Heiko & Roman Lochmann
- Country of origin: Germany
- Original language: German
- No. of seasons: 14

Production
- Executive producer: John de Mol Jr.
- Production locations: Studio Adlershof, Berlin
- Running time: 120–150 minutes

Original release
- Network: Sat.1
- Release: 5 April 2013 – present

Related
- The Voice of Germany; The Voice Senior; The Voice (franchise); The Voice Kids

The Voice Kids is a German reality talent show created by John de Mol Jr. and a junior version of The Voice of Germany. Based on the original The Voice Kids of Holland, the show was developed for children between the ages of 7 and 15. It began airing on Sat.1 on April 5, 2013.

There are five different stages to the show: producers' auditions, blind auditions, battle rounds, sing-offs, and final. There have been fourteen winners to date: Michèle Bircher (12), Danyiom Mesmer (14), Noah-Levi Korth (13), Lukas Janisch (13), Sofie Thomas (11), Anisa Celik (10), Mimi & Josefin (13 & 15), Lisa-Marie Ramm (15), Egon Werler (15), Georgia Balke (11), Emma Filipović (14), Jakob Hebgen (15), Neo Klingl (14), and Katelyn Harrington (12).

Since its inaugural season, Thore Schölermann served as the host until his departure after the fourteenth season. A second main presenter was introduced in 2015, with Chantal Janzen serving from 2015 to 2016, Debbie Schippers from 2017 to 2018, and Melissa Khalaj from 2019 to 2026. Khalaj was the sole presenter in 2026 and departed after that year. She will be succeeded by Andrea Kaiser, who is set to co-present the fifteenth season. Aline von Drateln was a backstage presenter in 2013 and was replaced by Nela Lee in 2014. The coaches for the upcoming fifteenth season are Mark Forster, Ayliva, and Wincent Weiss. Other coaches from previous seasons include Lena Meyer-Landrut, Henning Wehland, Tim Bendzko, Johannes Strate, Sasha Schmitz, the duo Nena & Larissa Kerner, Max Giesinger, the duo The BossHoss, Stefanie Kloß, Lukas Nimscheck & Flo Sump from the band Deine Freunde, Álvaro Soler, the duo Michi Beck & Smudo, Clueso, the duo Heiko & Roman Lochmann, Leony, and Michael Patrick Kelly.

== Format ==
On 25 October 2012, Sat.1 announced that they will produce the a children's version of The Voice of Germany with Talpa and Schwartzkopff TV Productions. The new show, The Voice Kids, is based on the format of the original show and focuses on children between the ages of 8 and 15. Performers for the first season had to apply to participate, and about 70 children were cast for the first phase, the "Blind Auditions". The children are onstage with a large, curved curtain around them, effectively concealing their identity from the judges, audience, and viewers. The 3 jury members are sitting in swivel chairs with their backs to the stage.

During the performance, they can elect to support a candidate by pressing a buzzer, which will automatically turn their seat towards the stage. At the end of their performance, the curtain drops, revealing the singer who then learns whether any chairs turned for them. If only one judge turns their chair, the candidate is automatically on their team. If more than one chair turns, the candidate chooses who they would like to have as their coach.

The second week of the competition is training week in which the coaches prepare their candidates for the second phase of competition, called the "Battle Round." In the Battle Round three candidates of the same coaching group are chosen to sing the same song as a trio. Each coach then picks one of their three candidates to continue on to the Final round. In season 9, coaches can steal one losing artist from the battle rounds via "Steal Deal." Also, in the same season, the coaches can send an artist directly to the final via "Fast Pass." The Steal Deal discontinued in the following two seasons, before making its return on season 12.

The winner of The Voice Kids receives a training stipend of €15,000 and an optional recording contract. The parents of the victor decide whether they pursue this option or not.

The Voice Kids Germany is the most internationally popular version of The Voice concept with a large YouTube audience for its clips with strong audience interest that stretches far beyond fellow Europeans from Brazil to Vietnam, the Philippines and New Zealand. This is in part due to the fact that the contestants often have a multicultural background with one German parent and one immigrant parent or are first generation German born to an immigrant family. This YouTube impact is exemplified by then-13-year-old performer Laura Kamhuber, born in Austria, whose performance of Dolly Parton's classic "I Will Always Love You" (popularized by Whitney Houston) in the blind audition of the first (2013) series has garnered over 200 million views on YouTube (as of April 17), and is the most watched YouTube video by an Austrian artist. However, the channel deleted that video and re-uploaded in July 2021.

== Coaches ==
The Voice Kids coaches
Coach	Seasons														
Coach	1	2	3	4	5	6	7	8	9	10	11	12	13	14	15
Lena															
Henning															
Tim															
Johannes															
Mark															
Sasha															
Nena & Larissa															
Max															
Stefanie															
BossHoss															
Deine Freunde															
Wincent															
Álvaro															
Michi & Smudo															
Ayliva															
Clueso															
Leony															
HE/RO															
Michael Patrick															

Coaches gallery

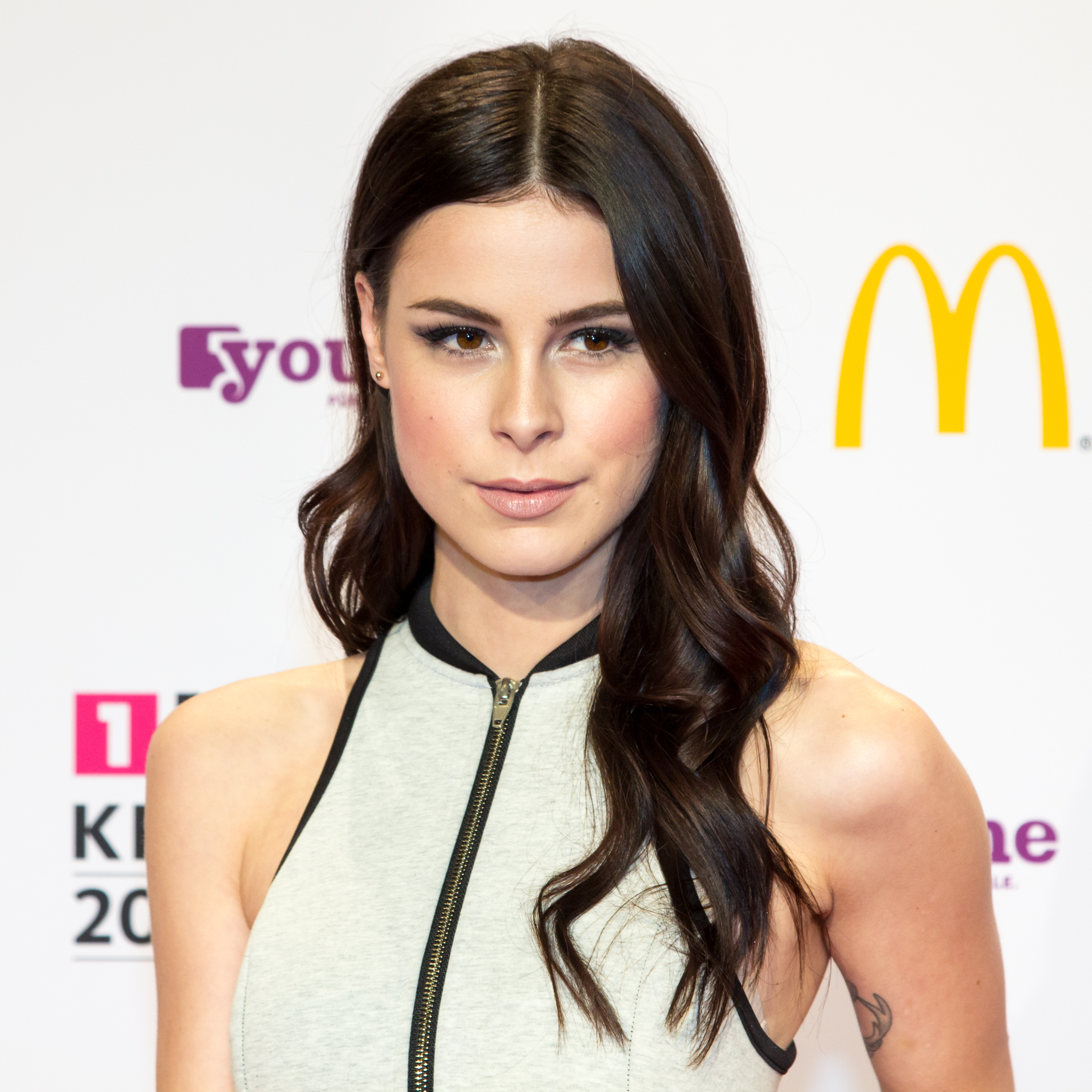
Lena Meyer-Landrut (2013–2016, 2019–2020, 2022–2024)

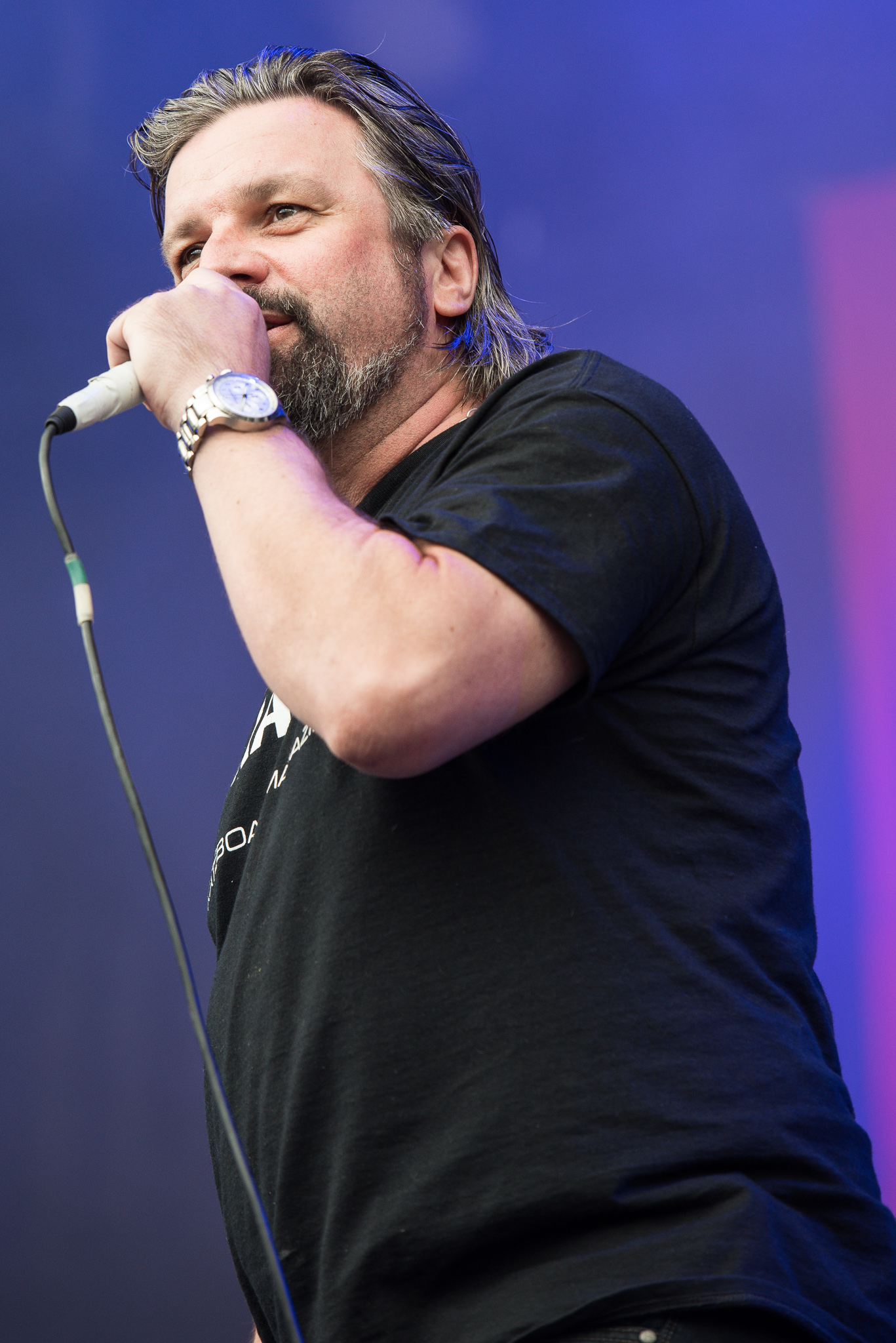
Henning Wehland (2013–2014)

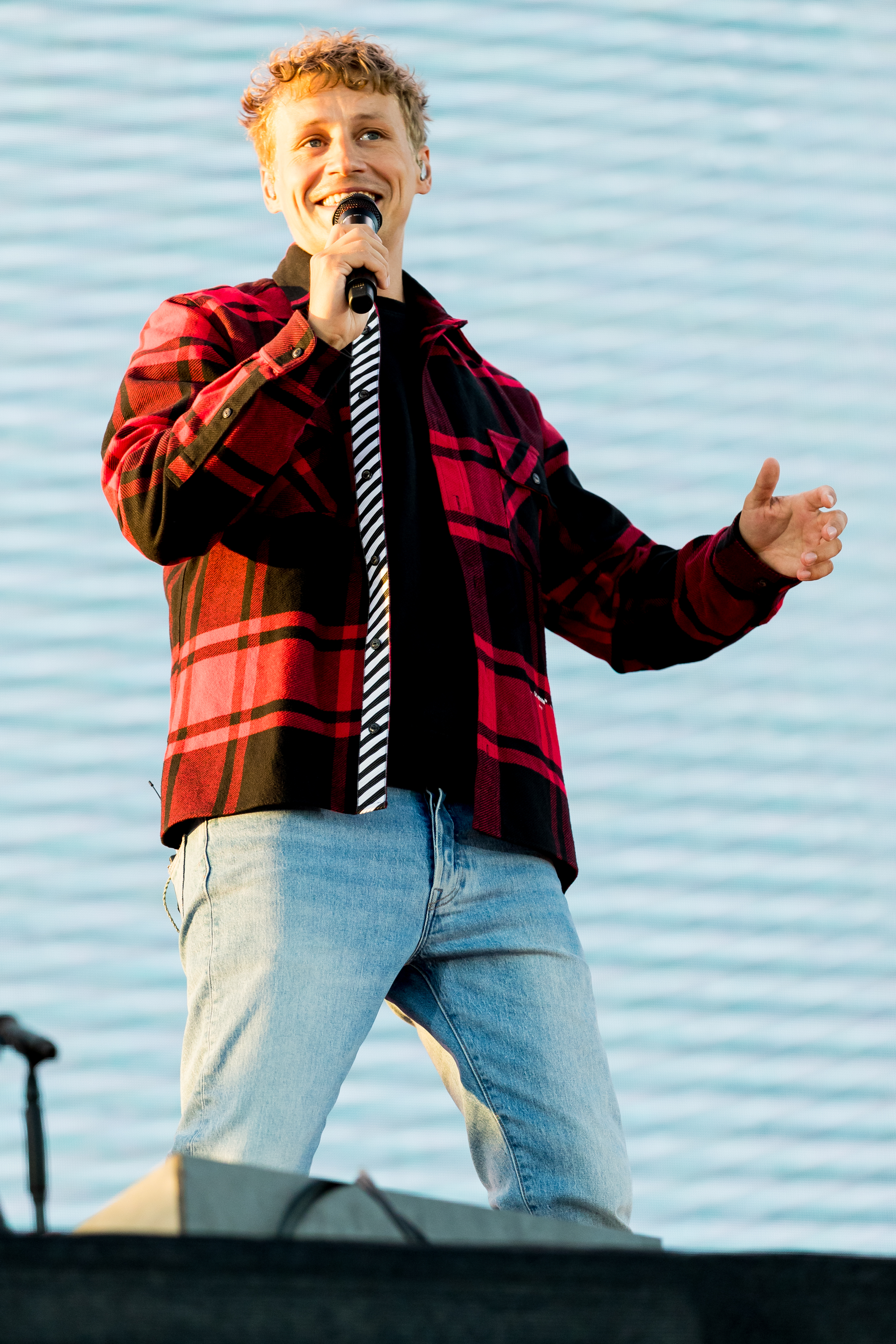
Tim Bendzko (2013)

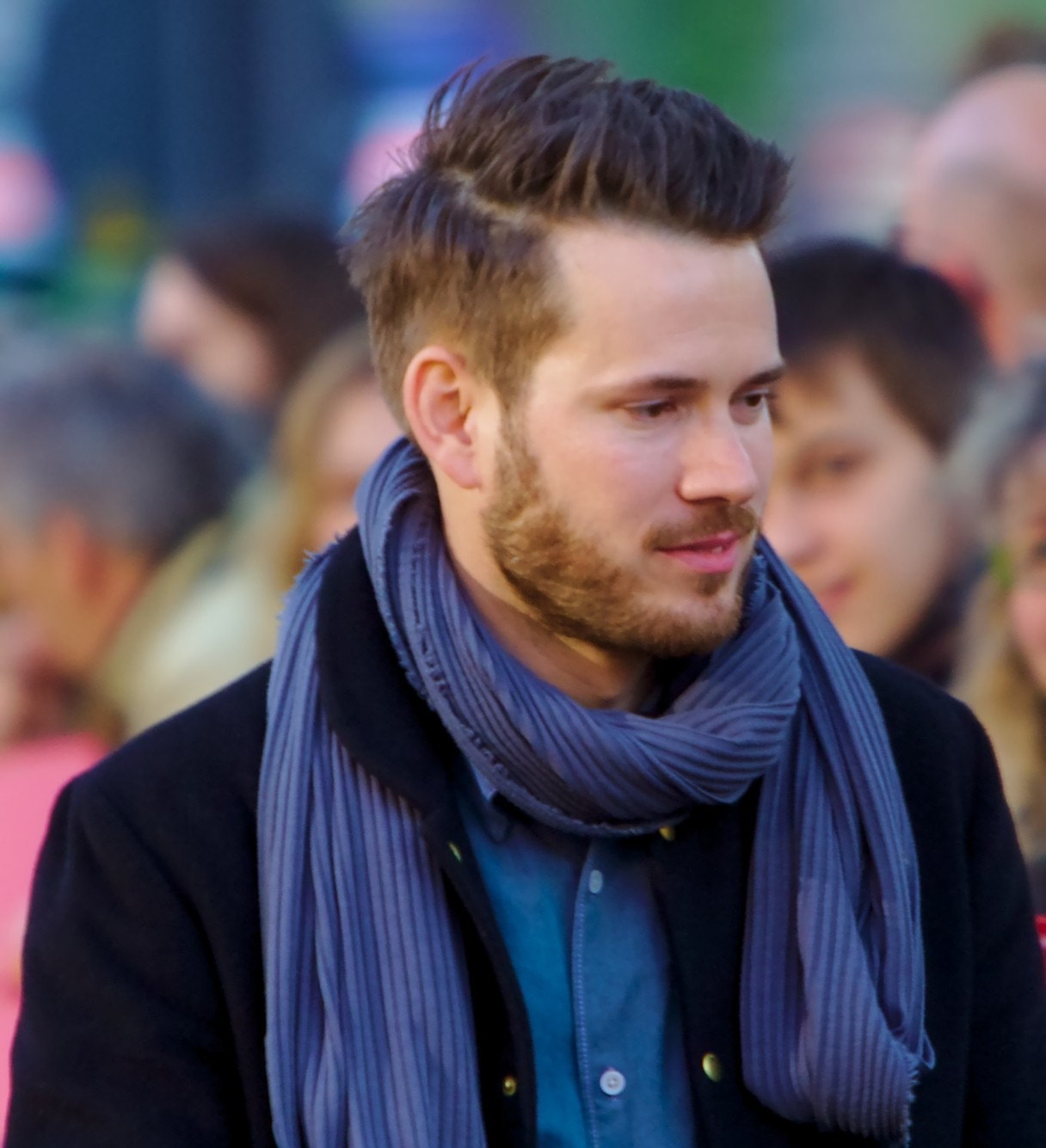
Johannes Strate (2014–2015)

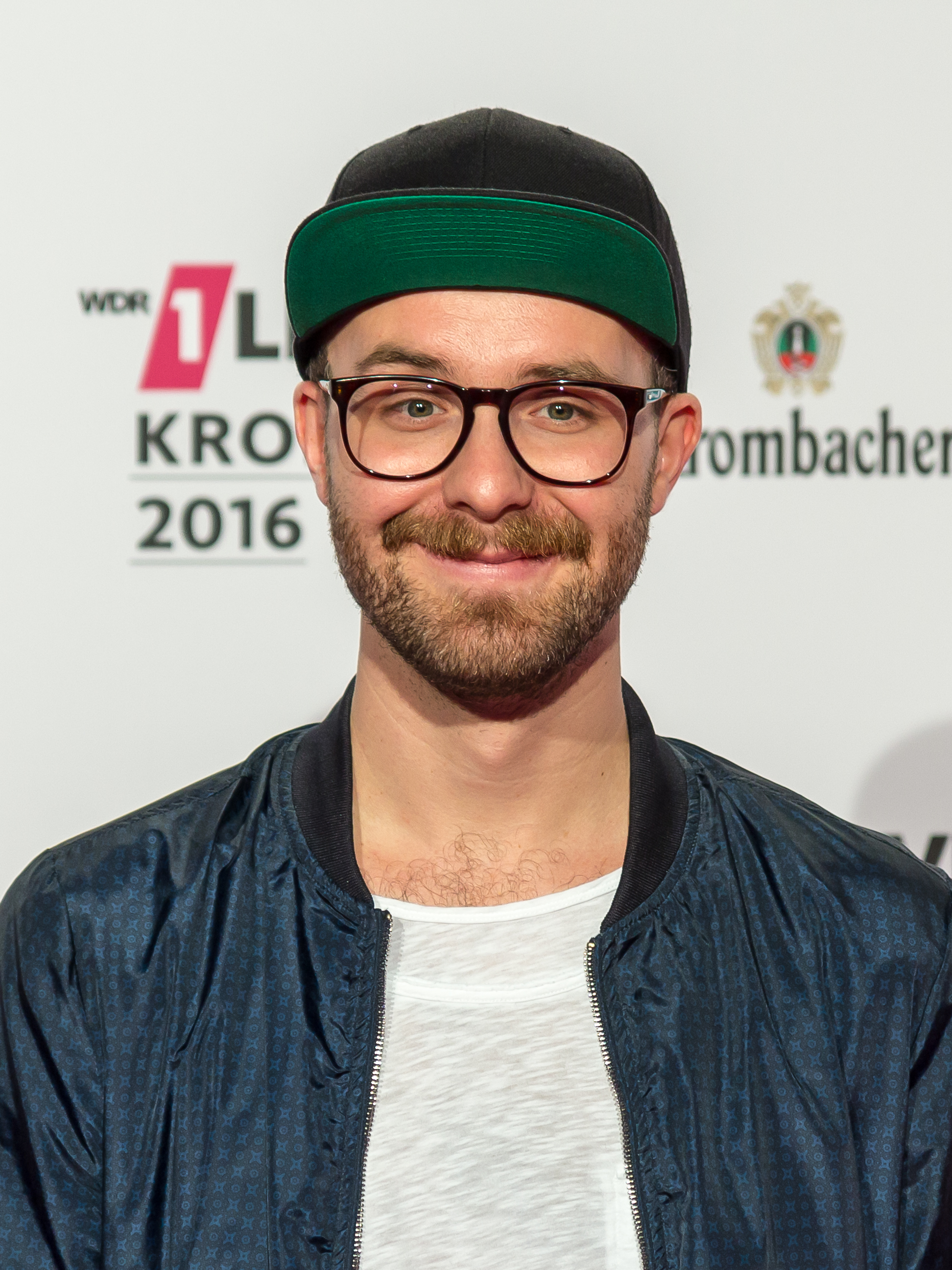
Mark Forster (2015–2019, upcoming in 2027)

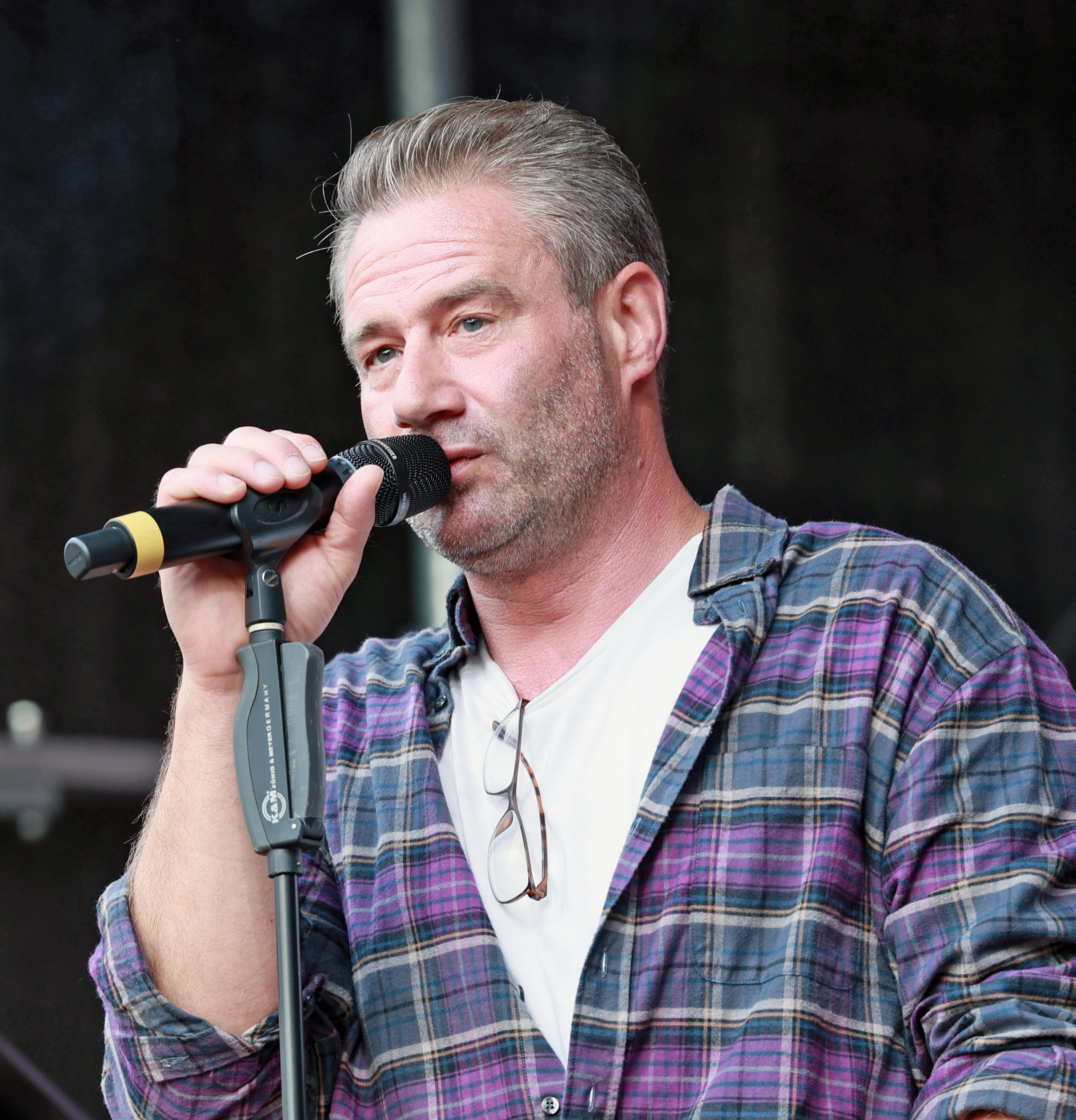
Sasha Schmitz (2016–2017, 2020)

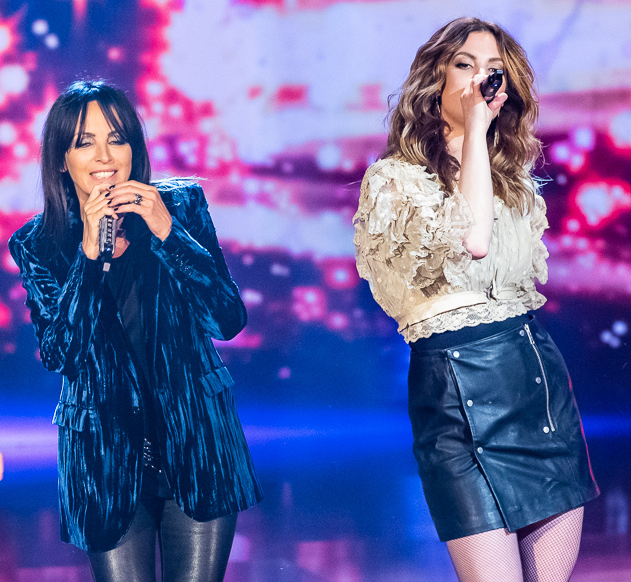
Nena & Larissa Kerner (duo, 2017–2018)

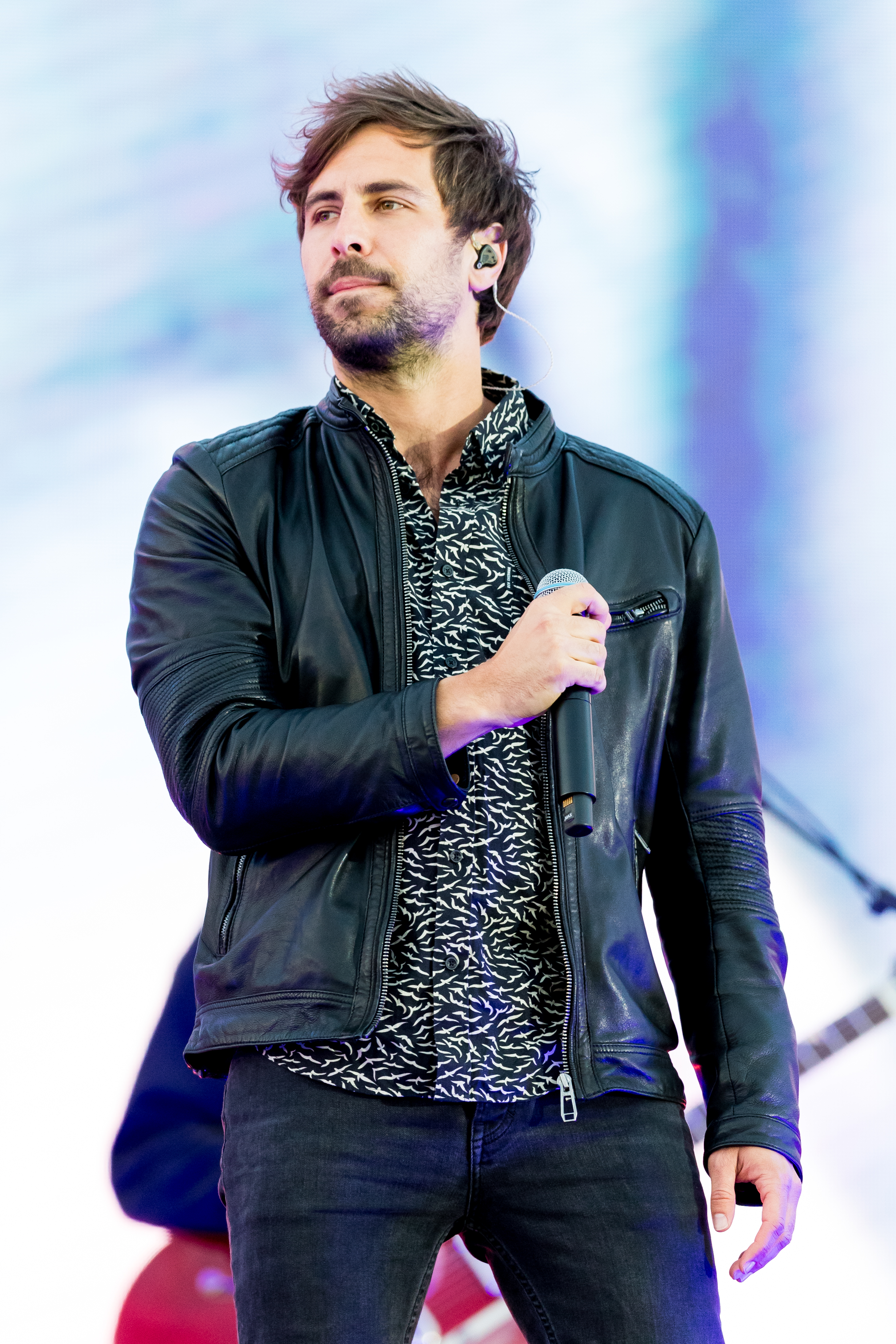
Max Giesinger (2018, 2020)

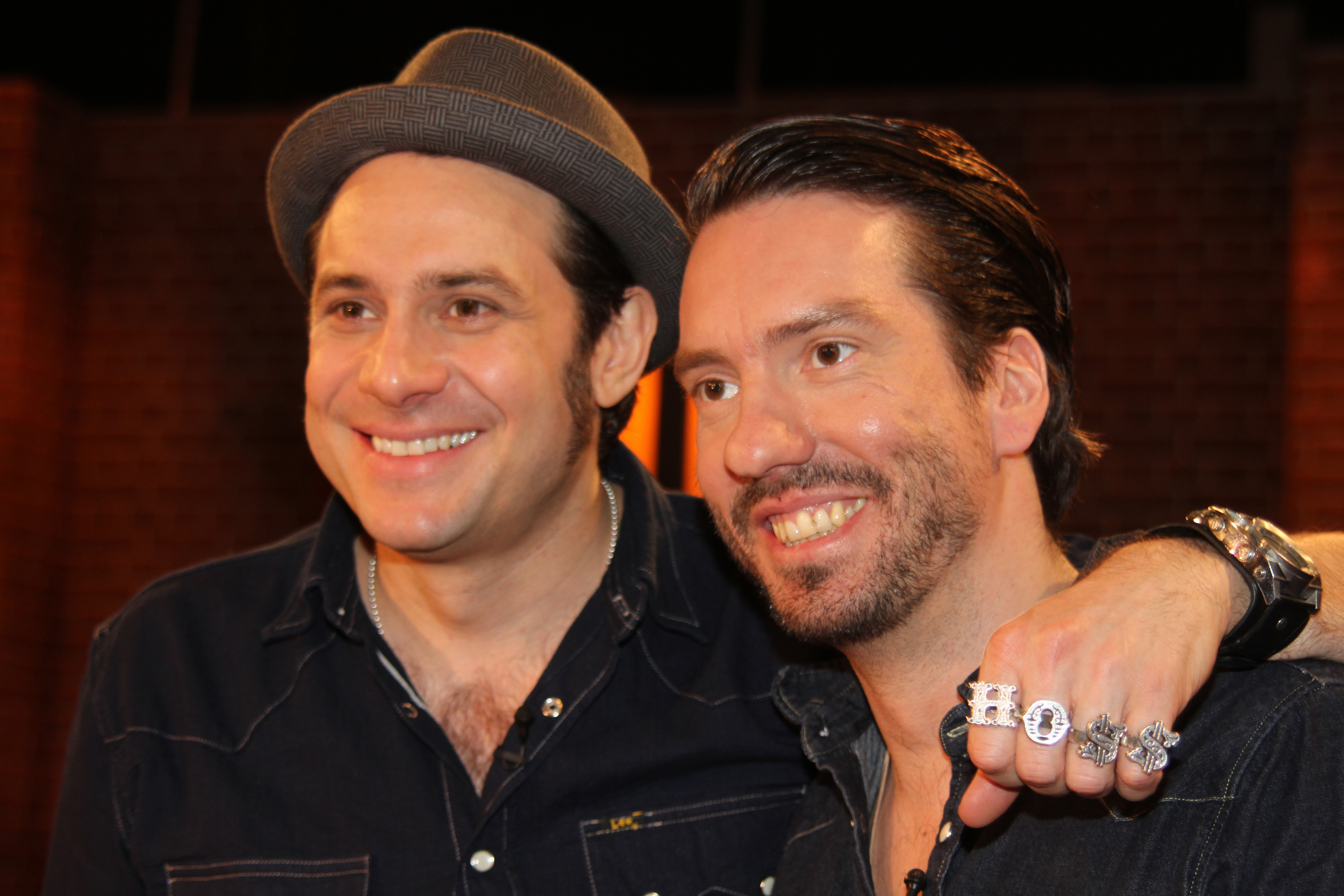
The BossHoss (duo, 2019)

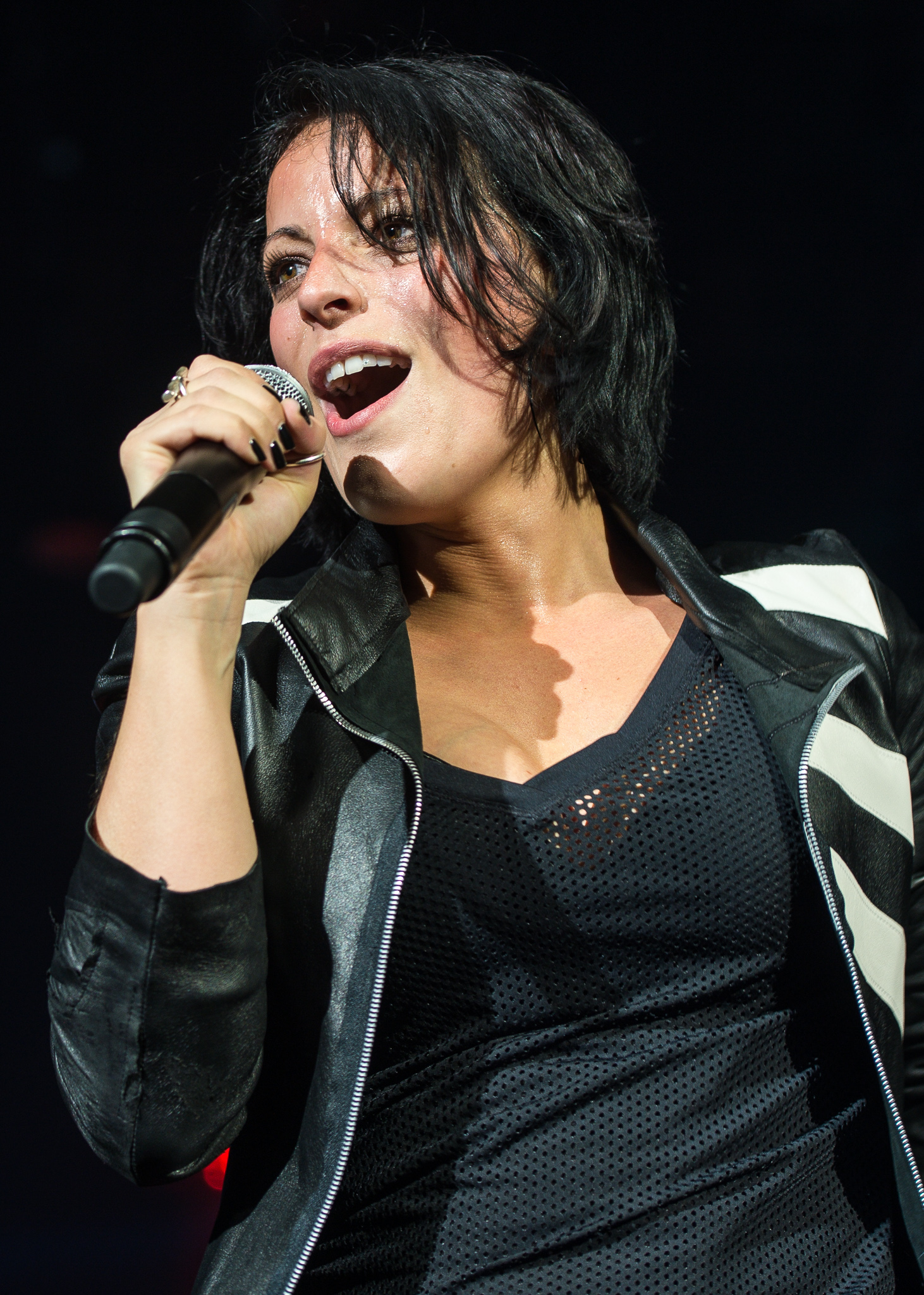
Stefanie Kloß (2019, 2021, 2025)

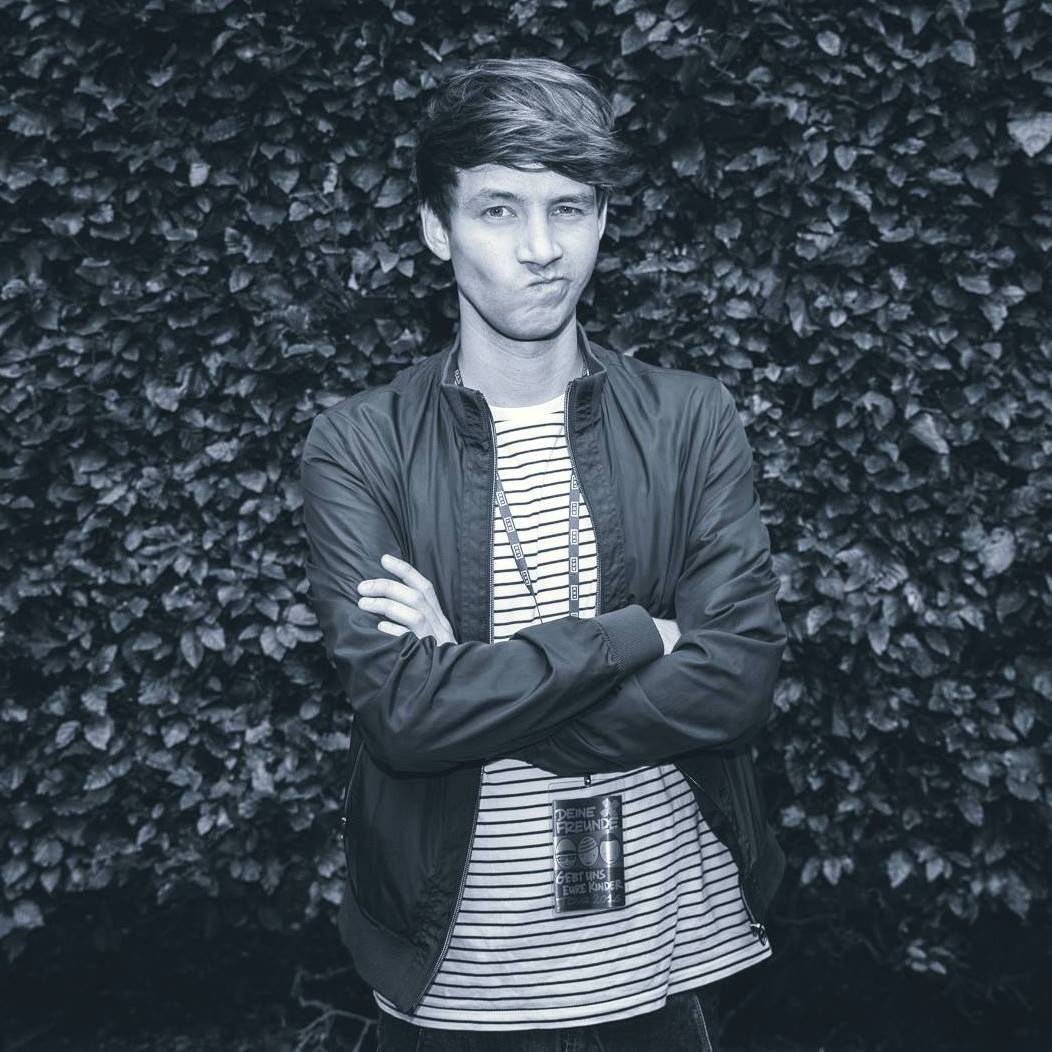
Lukas Nimscheck (Deine Freunde, duo, 2020)

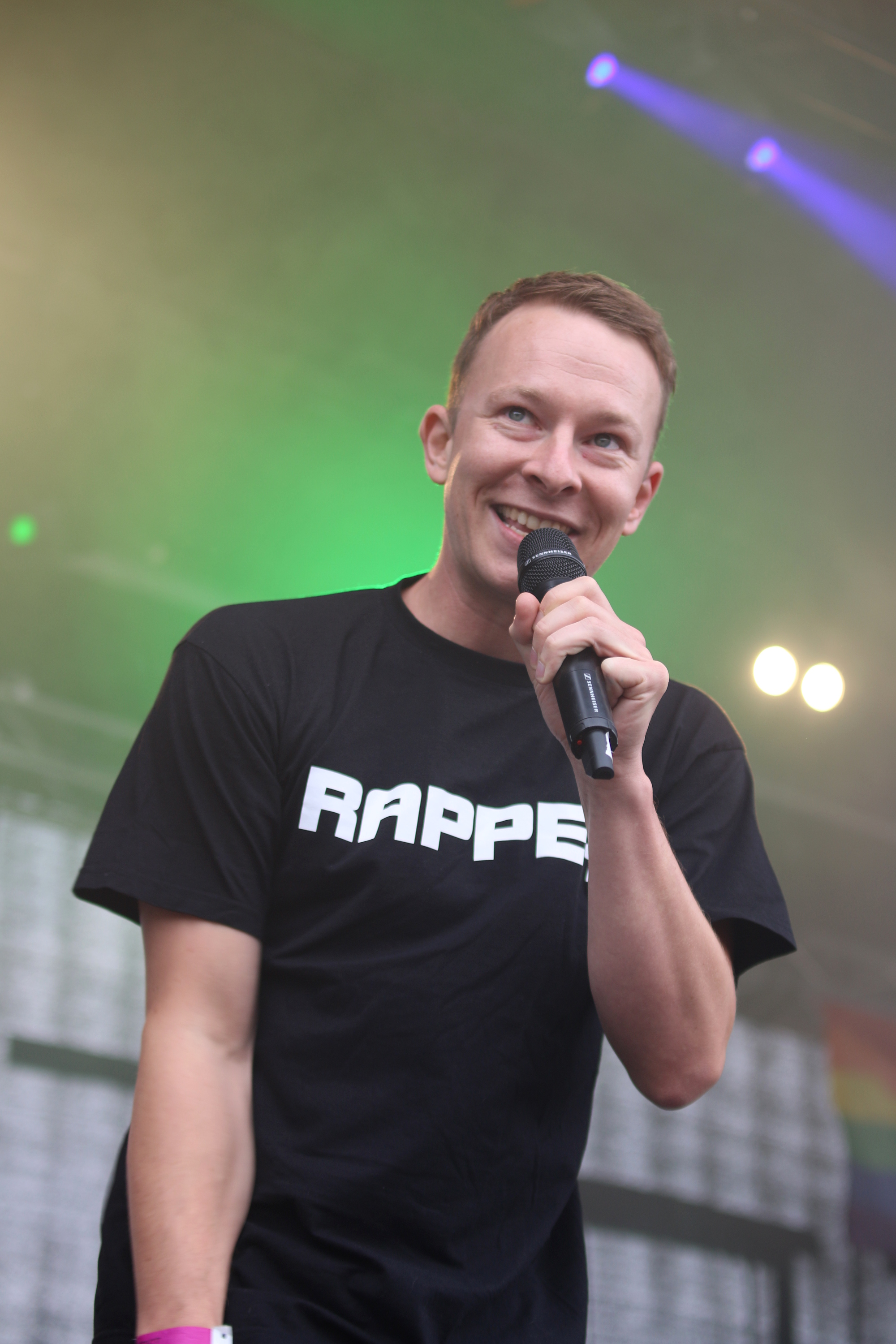
Flo Sump (Deine Freunde, duo, 2020)

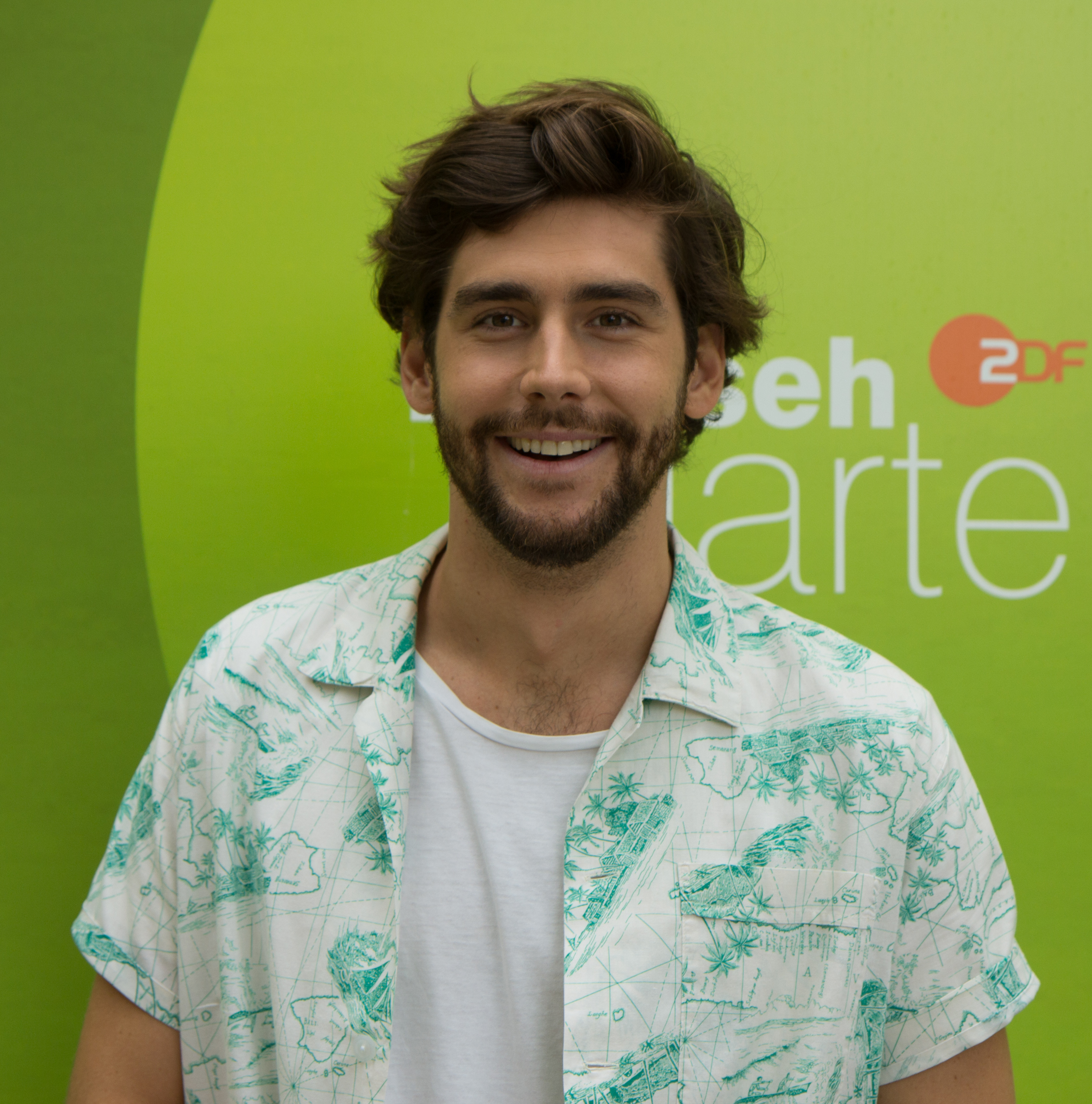
Álvaro Soler (2021–2024, 2026)

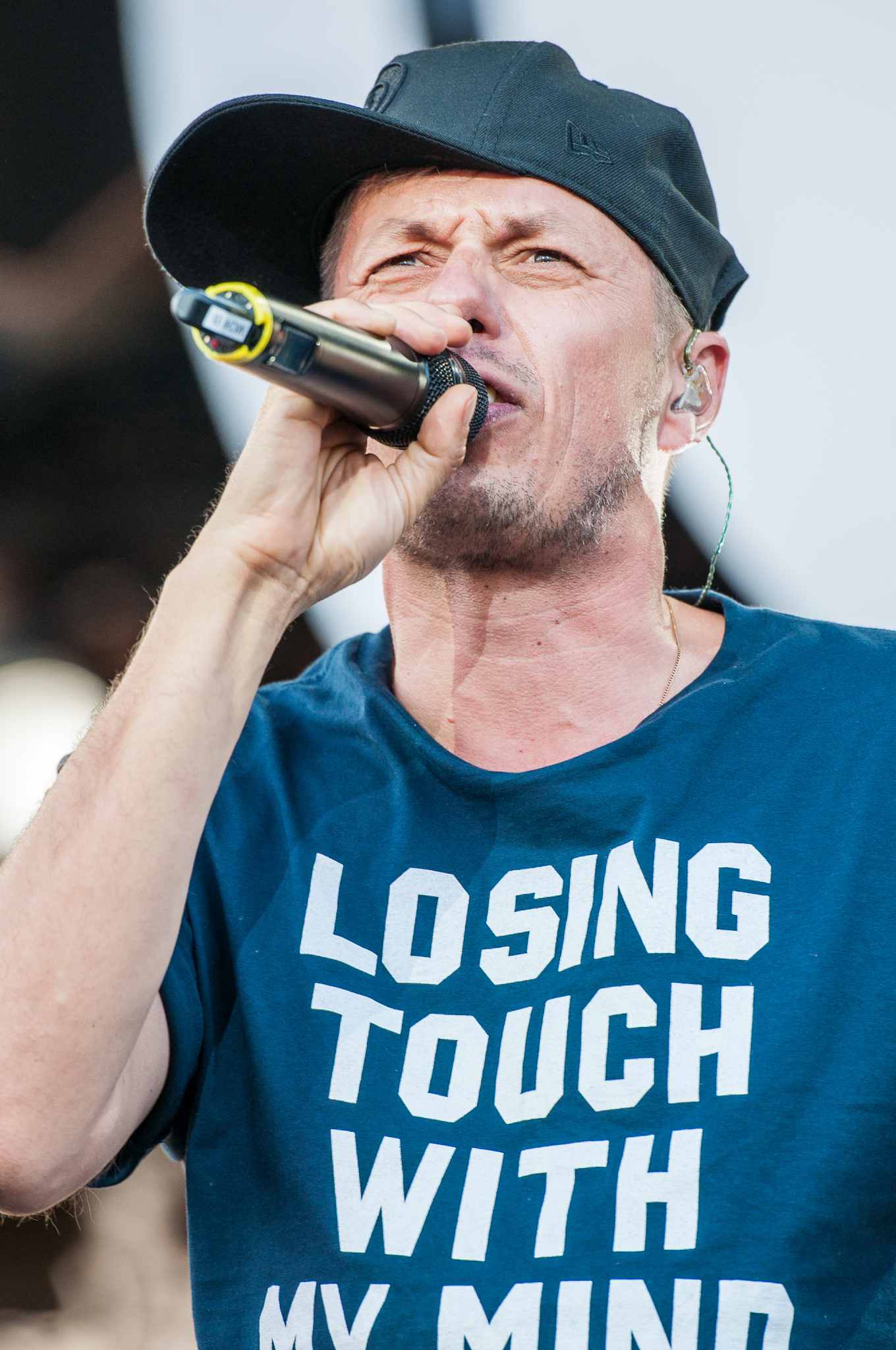
Michi Beck (duo, 2021–2024)

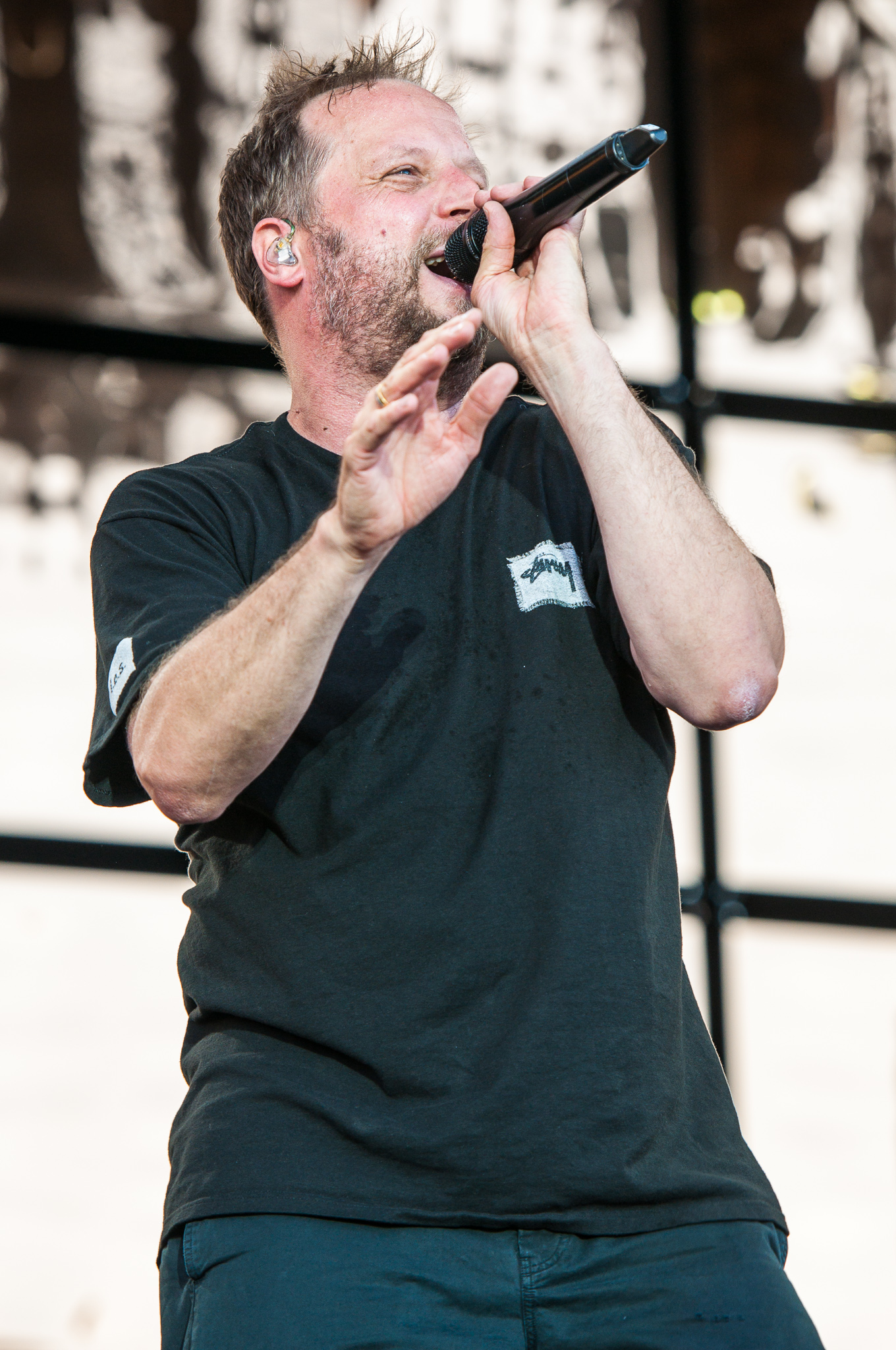
Smudo (duo, 2021–2024)

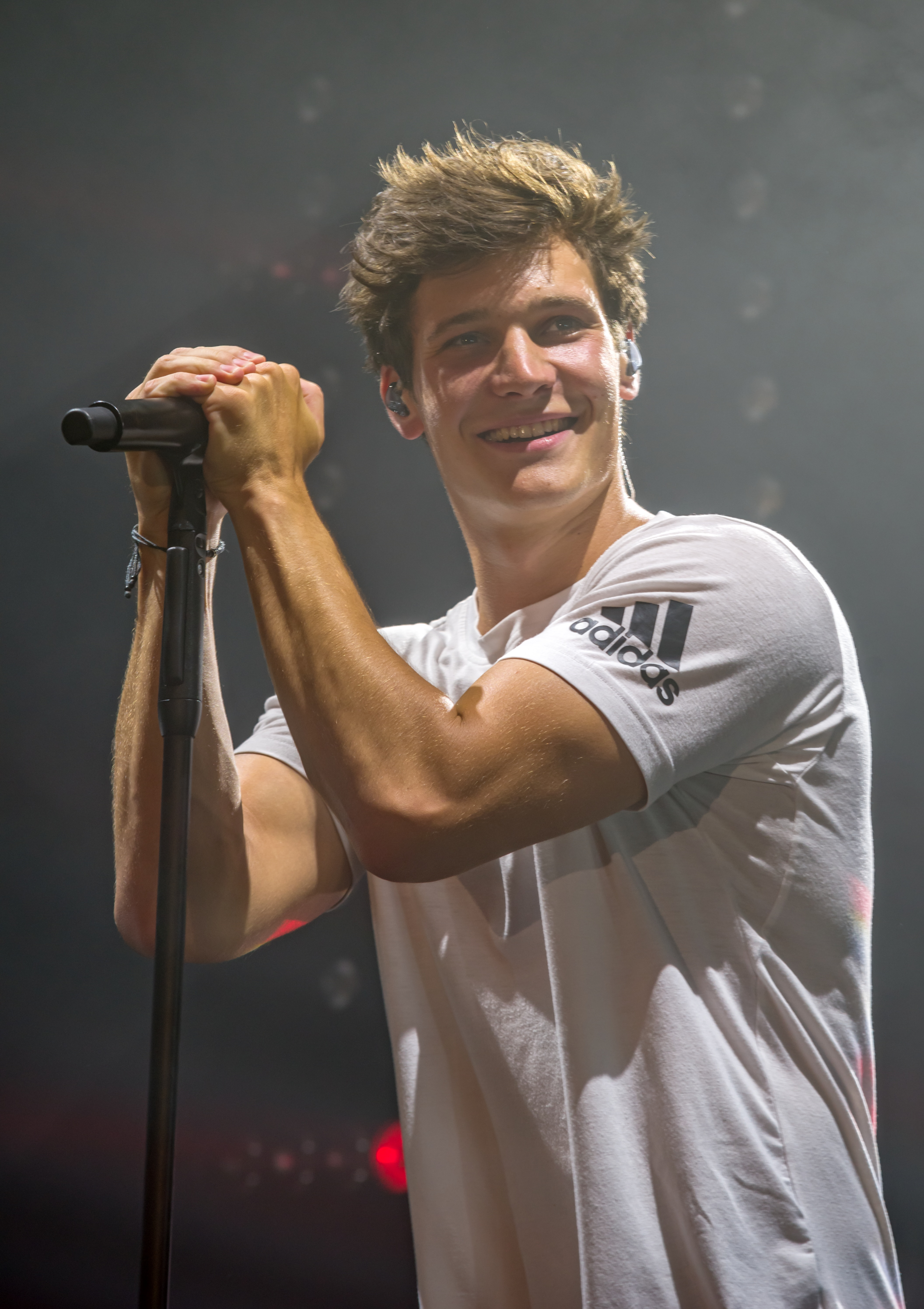
Wincent Weiss (2021–2025, upcoming in 2027)

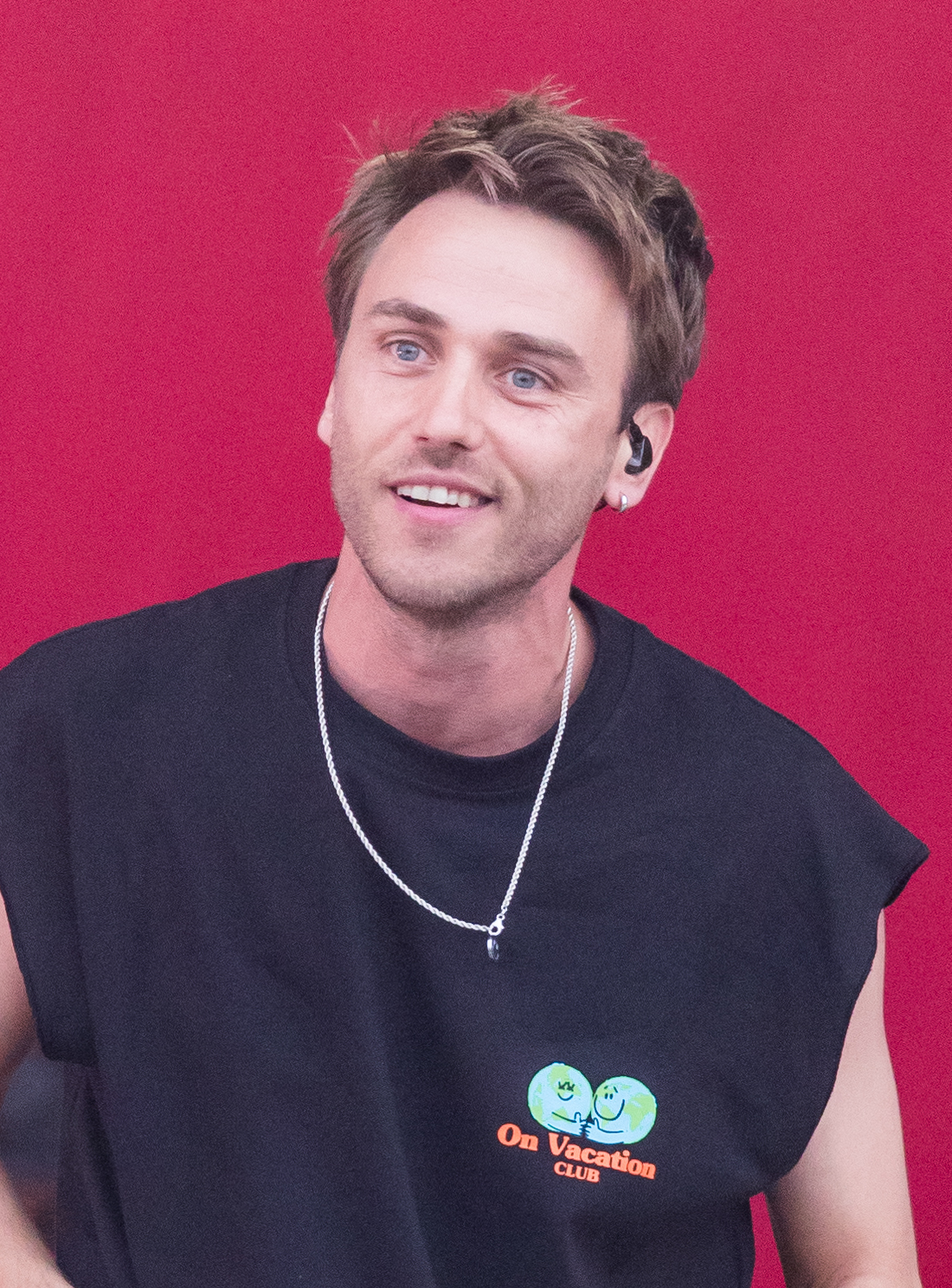
Clueso (2025)

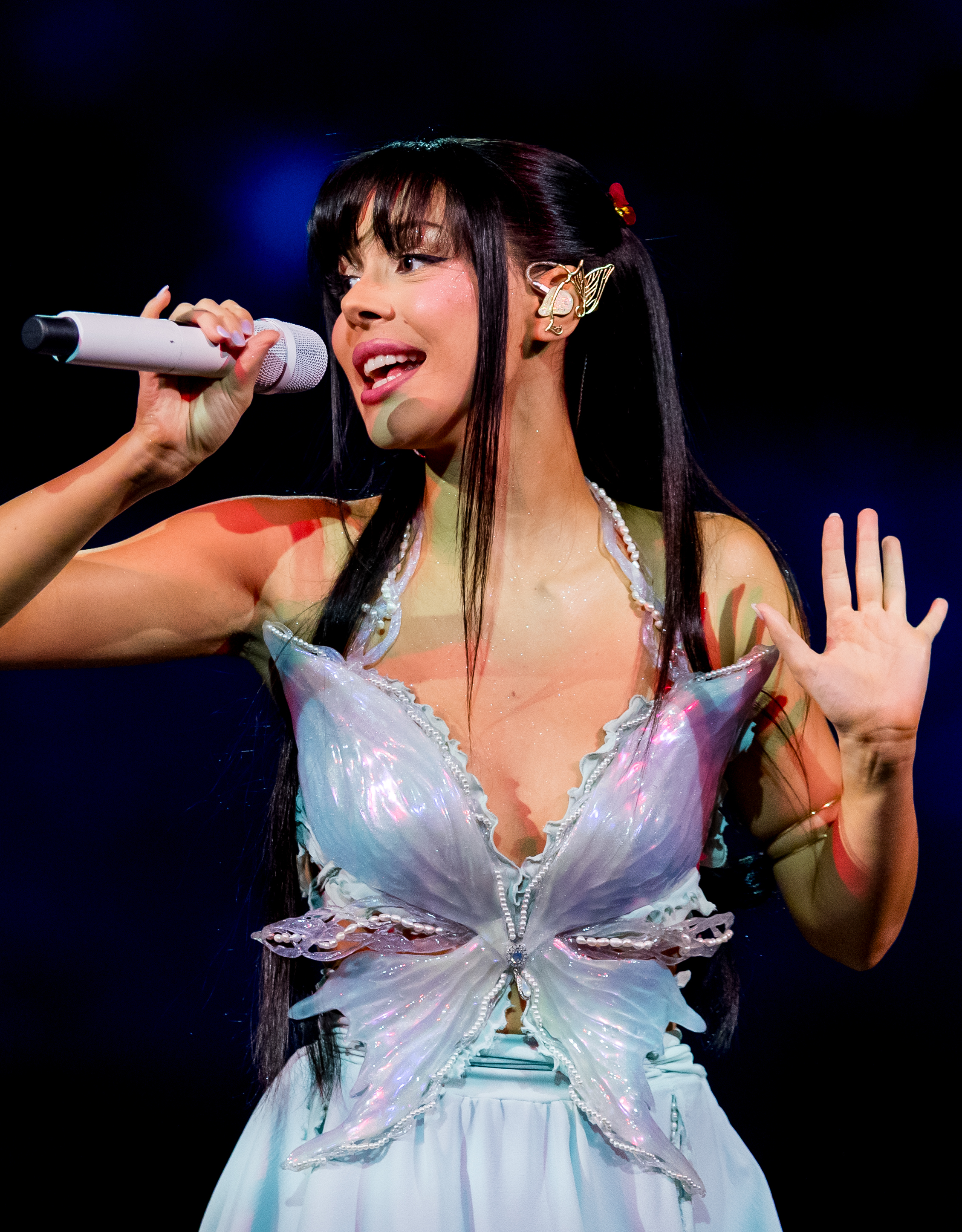
Ayliva (2025, upcoming in 2027)

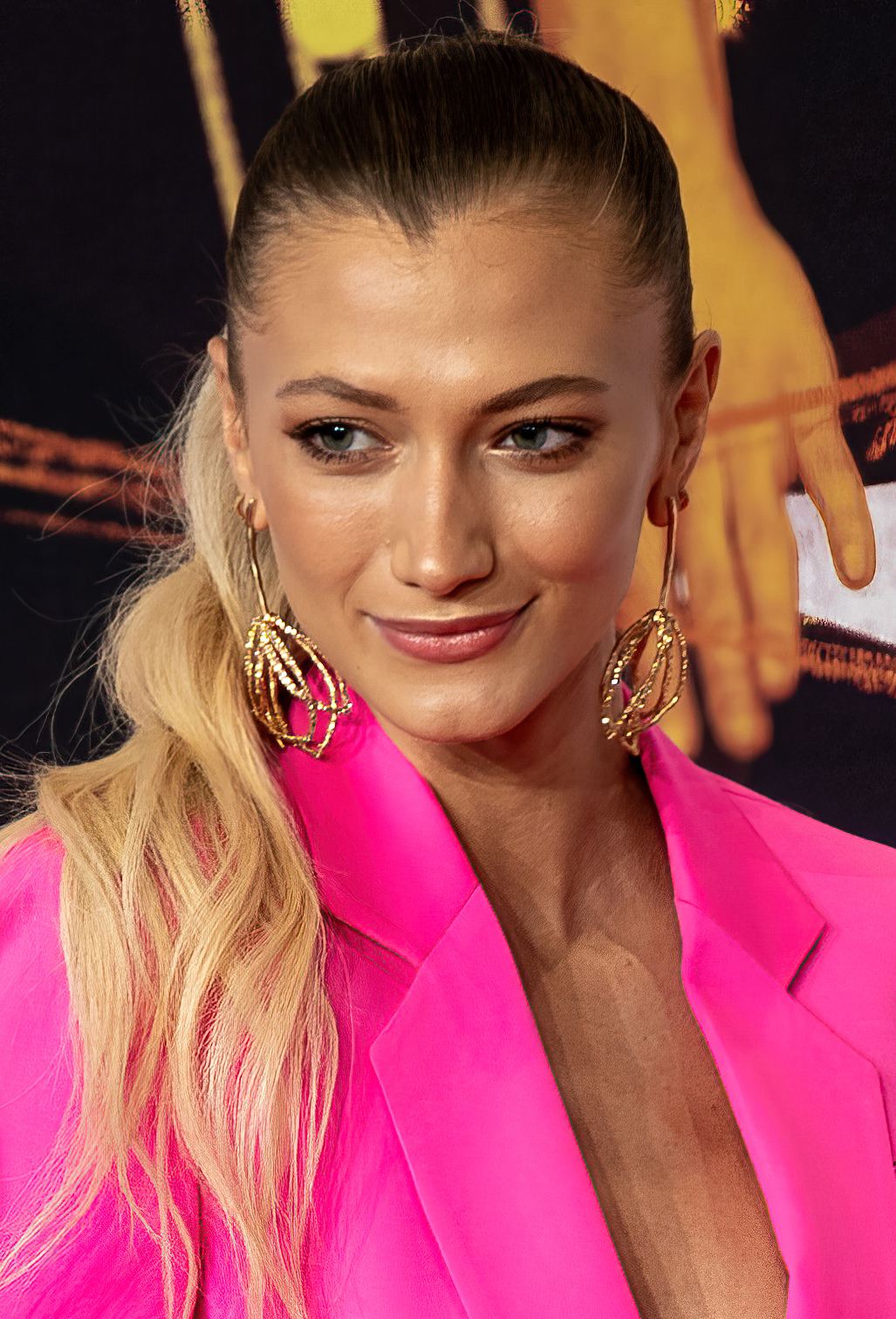
Leony (2026)

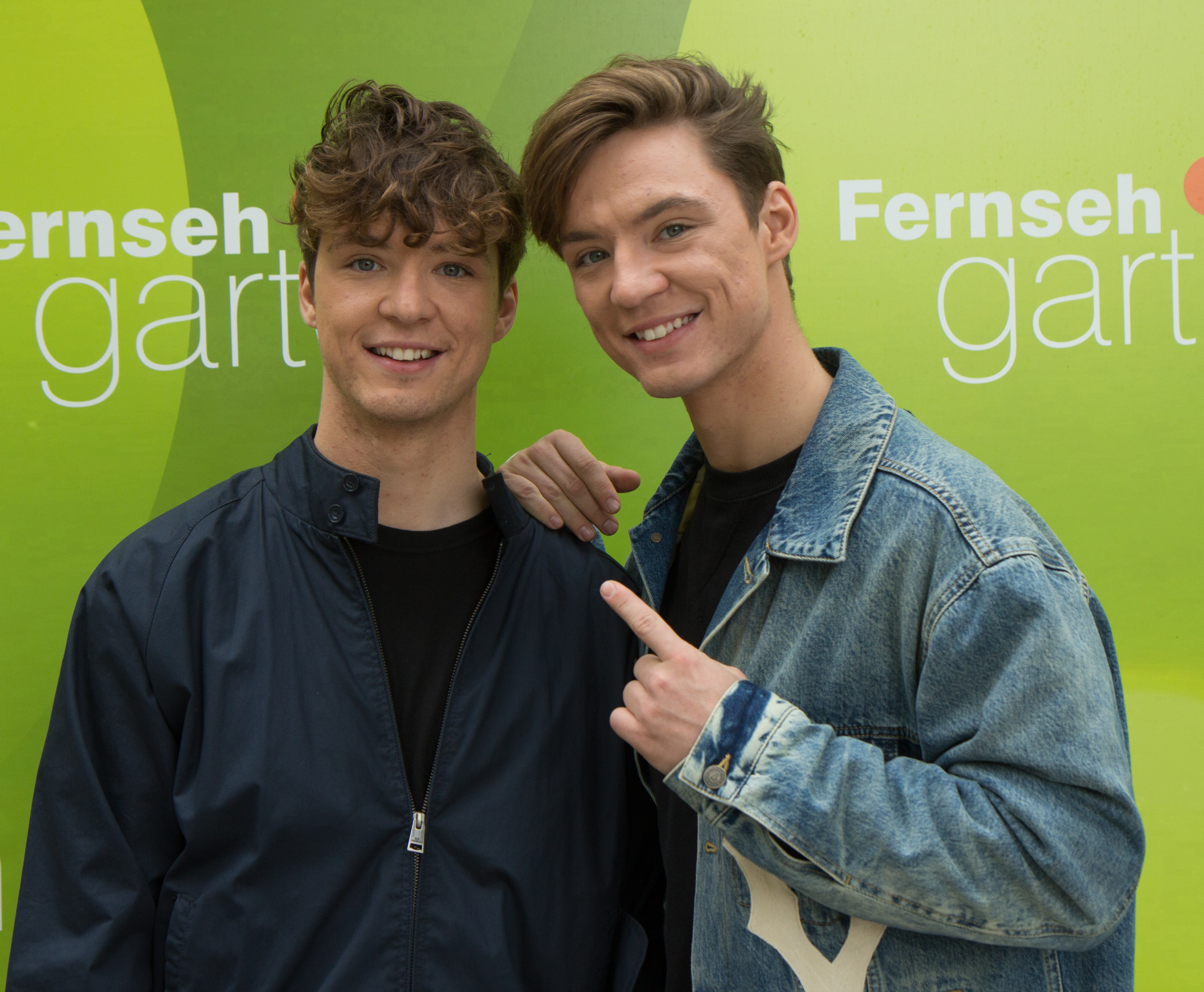
Heiko & Roman Lochmann (2026)

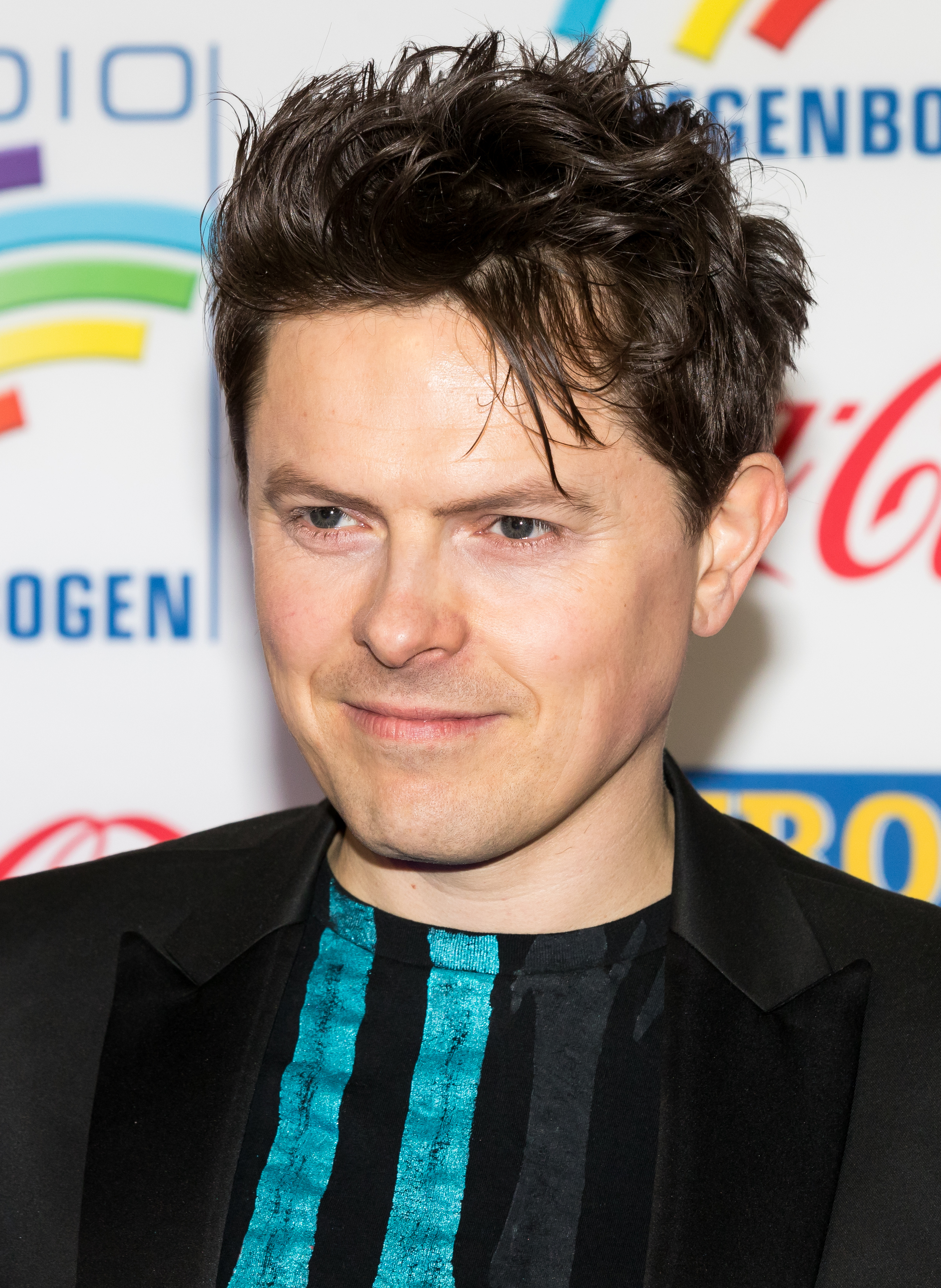
Michael Patrick Kelly (2026)

=== Lineup of coaches ===
Coaches' line-up by chairs order
Season	Year	Coaches			
Season	Year	1	2	3	4
1	2013	Tim	Lena	Henning	—N/a
2	2014	Johannes	Lena	Henning	—N/a
3	2015	Johannes	Lena	Mark	—N/a
4	2016	Sasha	Lena	Mark	—N/a
5	2017	Sasha	Nena & Larissa	Mark	—N/a
6	2018	Mark	Nena & Larissa	Max	—N/a
7	2019	Mark	Stefanie	BossHoss	Lena
8	2020	Max	Lena	Deine Freunde	Sasha
9	2021	Álvaro	Michi Smudo	Stefanie	Wincent
10	2022	Álvaro	Michi Smudo	Lena	Wincent
11	2023	Álvaro	Michi Smudo	Lena	Wincent
12	2024	Álvaro	Michi Smudo	Lena	Wincent
13	2025	Wincent	Ayliva	Clueso	Stefanie
14	2026	Álvaro	HE/RO	Leony	Michael Patrick
15	2027	Mark	Ayliva	Wincent	—N/a
16	2028	Álvaro	Leony	Clueso	Lena
17	2029	Stefanie	Bill + Tom	Sarah	Wincent

== Presenters ==
Key
Main presenter
Backstage presenter
Backstage-online presenter

The Voice Kids presenters
Presenter	Seasons														
Presenter	1	2	3	4	5	6	7	8	9	10	11	12	13	14	15
Thore															
Chantal															
Debbie															
Melissa															
Andrea															
Aline															
Nela															
Marc															
Noah-Levi															
Jonas															
Iggi															
Mimi & Josefin															
Keanu															
Egon															
Chiara															

Main Presenters gallery

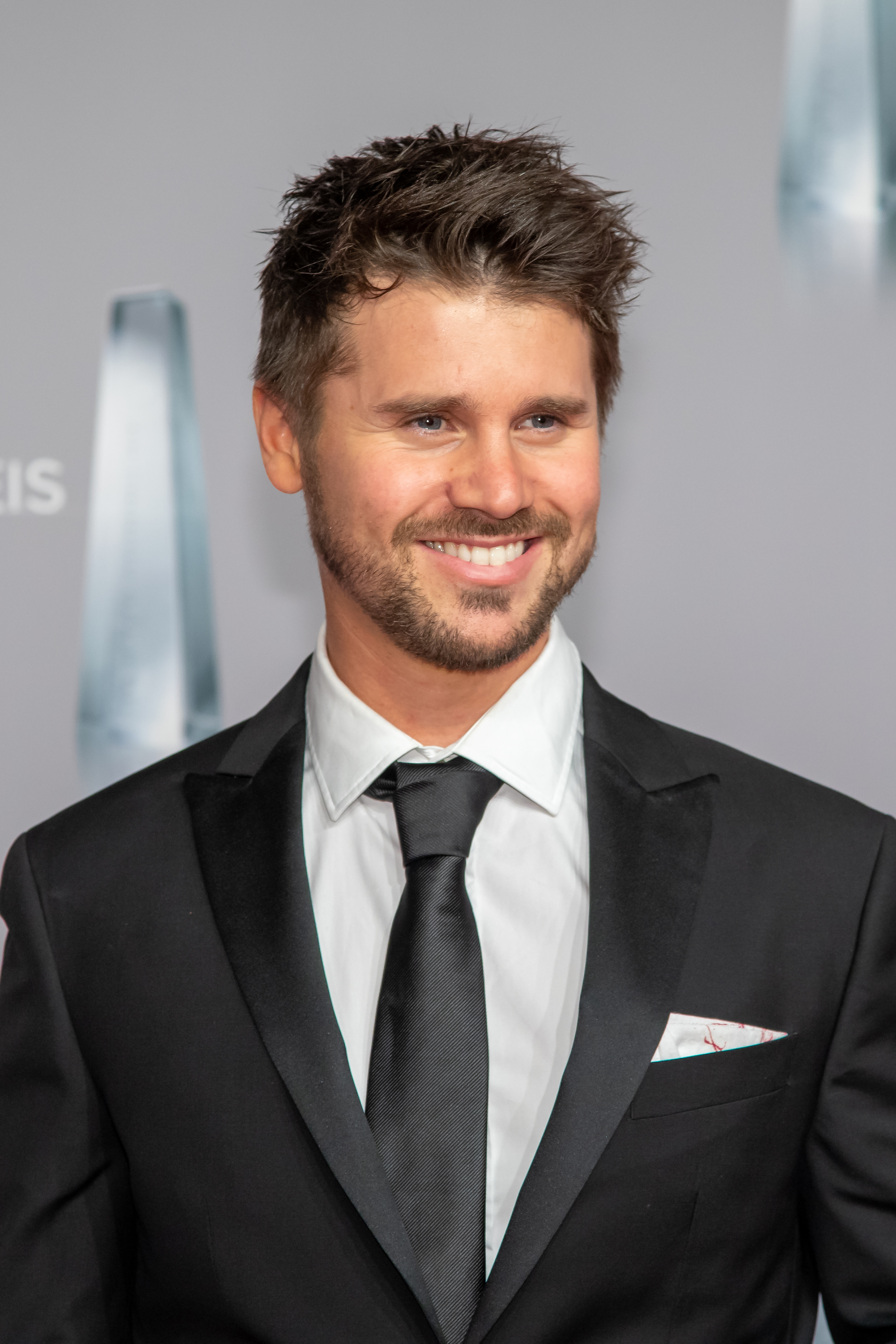
Thore Schölermann (2013–2025)

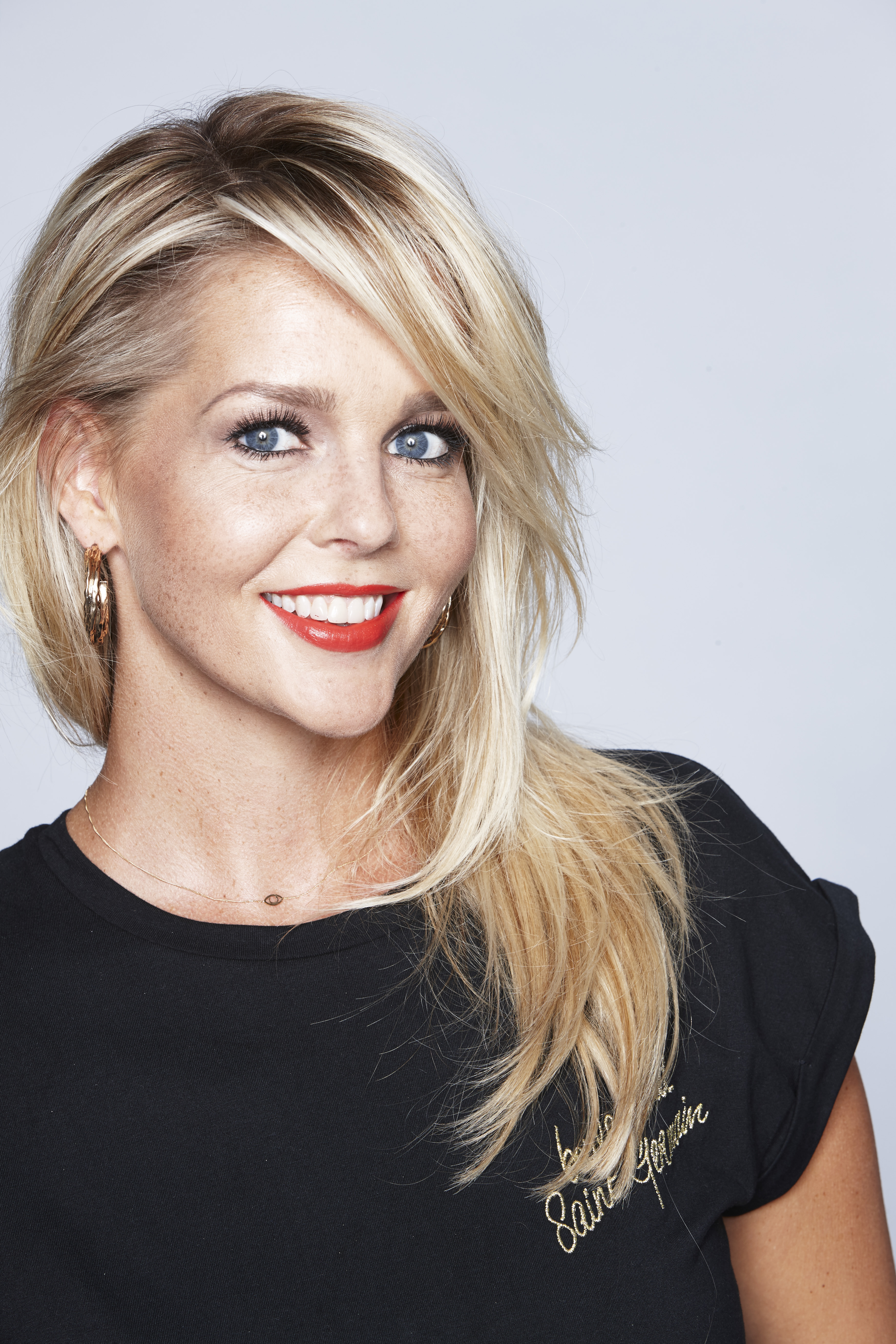
Chantal Janzen (2015–2016)

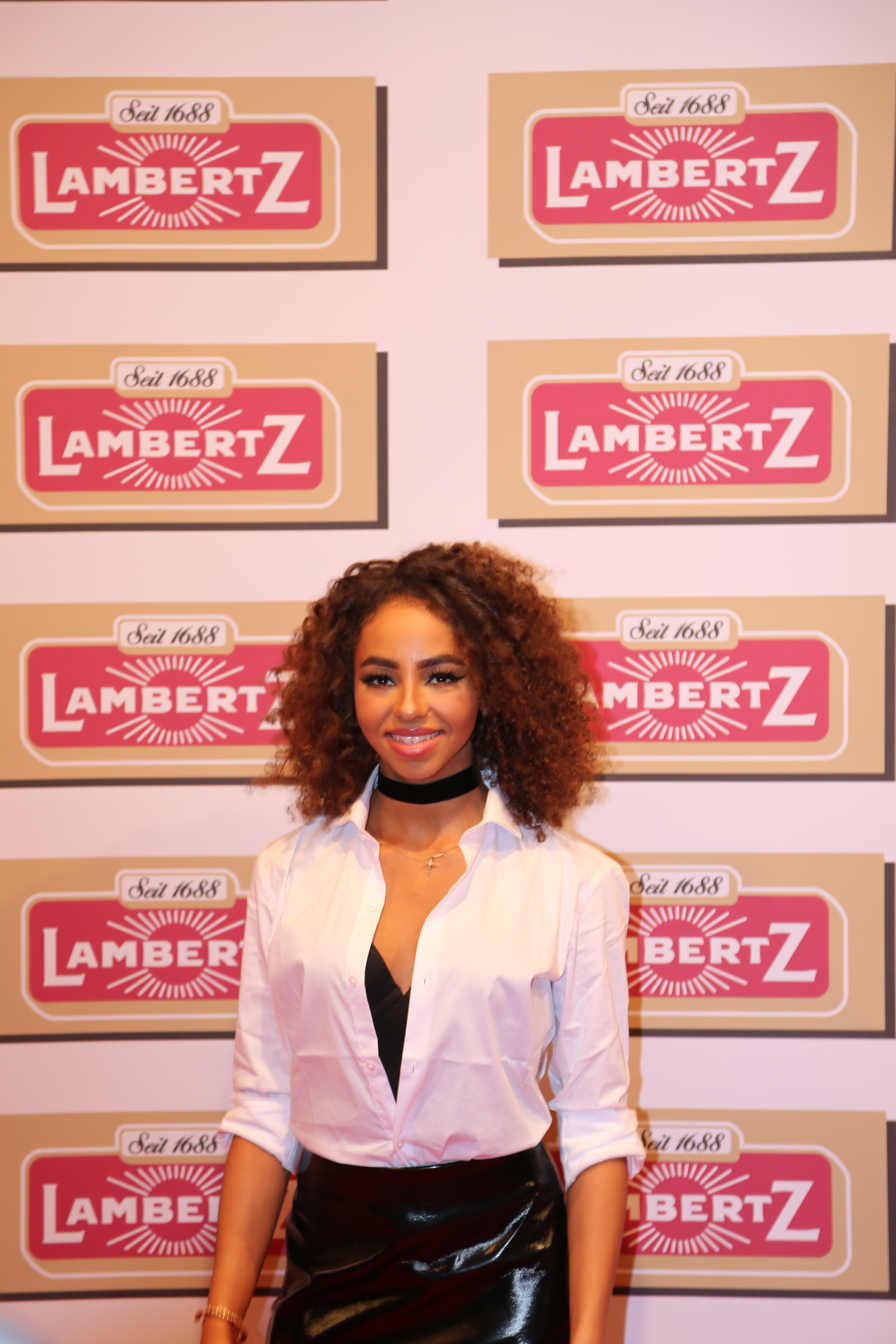
Debbie Schippers (2017–2018)

Melissa Khalaj (2019–2026)

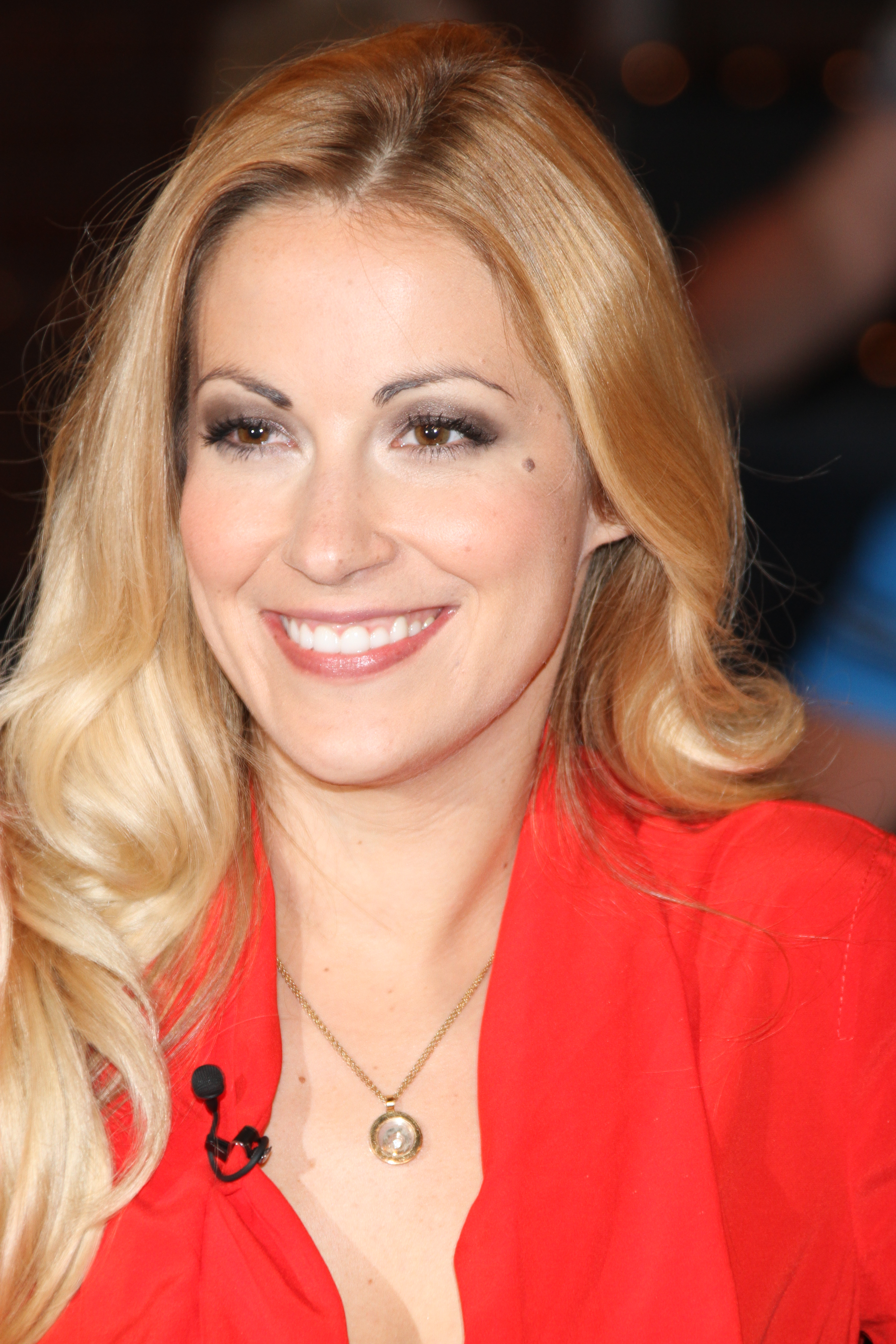
Andrea Kaiser (upcoming in 2027)
Backstage Presenters gallery

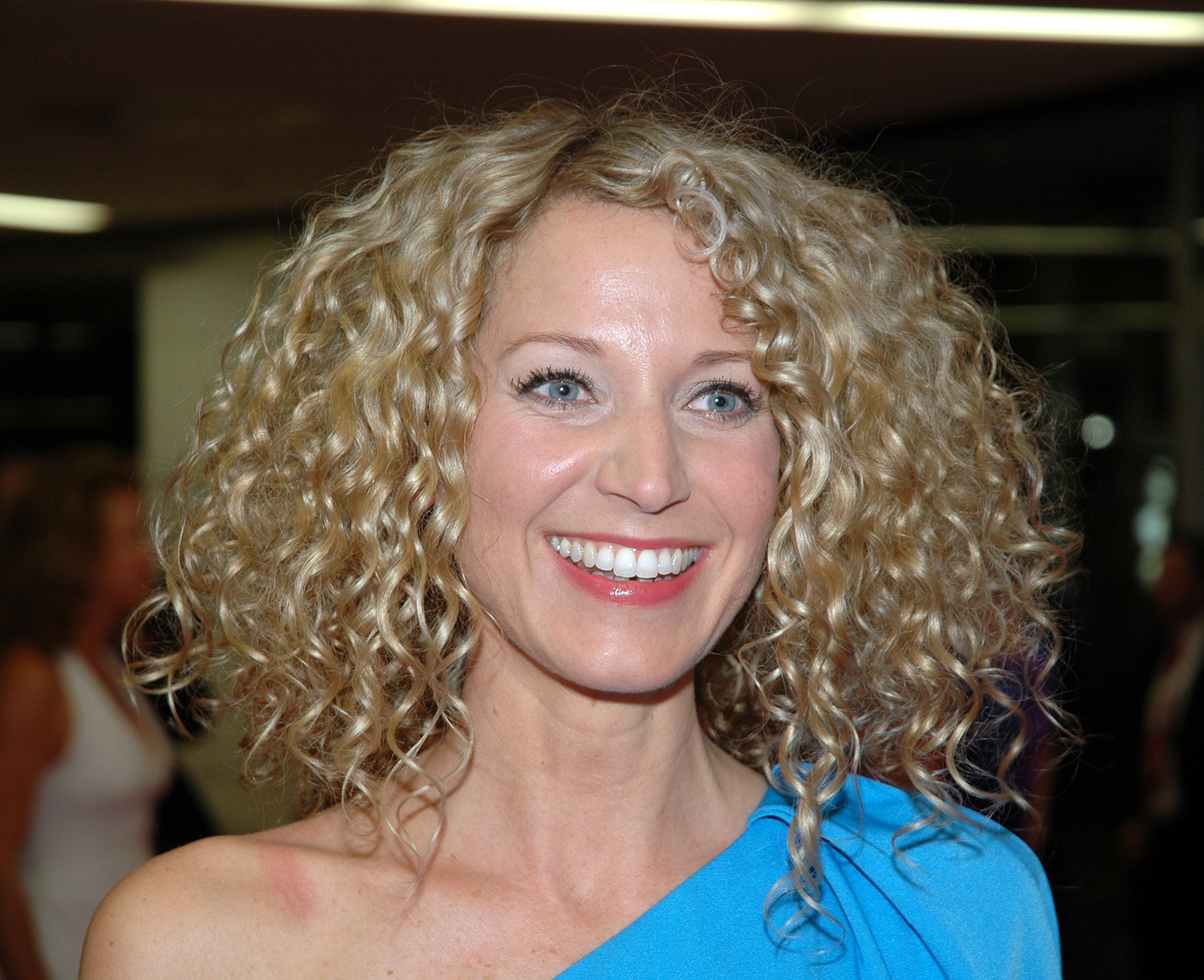
Aline von Drateln (2013)

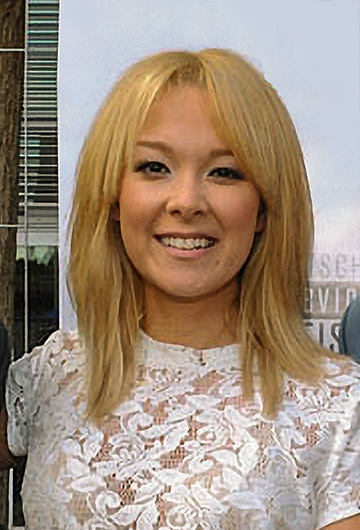
Nela Lee (2014)

== Coaches and finalists ==
Winner
Runner-up
Third Place
Fourth Place
Fast past to the Final

- Winners are in bold, the finalists that went in the televoting are in italicized font, and the eliminated artists are in small font.

Season	Coaches and their finalists			
1	Tim Bendzko	Lena Meyer-Landrut	Henning Wehland	—N/a
1	Rita Gueli; Finn Hackenberg	Tim Peltzer; Aulona	**Michèle Bircher**; Stephanie Schmidt	—N/a
2	Johannes Strate	Lena Meyer-Landrut	Henning Wehland	—N/a
2	Carlotta Truman; Jamica Blackett	Richard Istel; Selin Atici	**Danyiom Mesmer**; Hanna Michalowicz	—N/a
3	Johannes Strate	Lena Meyer-Landrut	Mark Forster	—N/a
3	Cosma Leonie; Nestor	**Noah-Levi Korth**; Samuel Wernik	Zoë; Antonia	—N/a
4	Sasha Schmitz	Lena Meyer-Landrut	Mark Forster	—N/a
4	Shanice Özbicer; Noël Lunguana	Ridon Jakupi; Matteo Markus	**Lukas Janisch**; Lara Bloß	—N/a
5	Sasha Schmitz	Nena & Larissa Kerner	Mark Forster	—N/a
5	Luca Emmanuel Kuglmeier; Marie-Sophie; Leonie	**Sofie Thomas**; Leon; Pia	Diana Donatella; Eric; Lina Kuduzović	—N/a
6	Mark Forster	Nena & Larissa Kerner	Max Giesinger	—N/a
6	**Anisa Celik**; Klaas Müller; Oliwia Czerniec	Santiago Ghigani; Alycia; Natalia Joy	Benicio Bryant; Flavio Rizzello; Jonah Wichmann	—N/a
7	Mark Forster	Stefanie Kloß	The BossHoss	Lena Meyer-Landrut
7	Davit Nikalayan; Teodora Vio	Lea DeFrant; Lazaros	**Mimi & Josefin**; Erik Panich	Thapelo Mashiane; Dio Dragaj
8	Max Giesinger	Lena Meyer-Landrut	Deine Freunde	Sasha Schmitz
8	Phil Schaller; Gianna	Nikolas Harrison; Liana	Leroy Erxleben; Paula Sophie	**Lisa-Marie Ramm**; Marc Altergott
9	Álvaro Soler	Michi & Smudo	Stefanie Kloß	Wincent Weiss
9	Isabella Paruzzo; Vivienne Hofmann; Oscar and Mino Orué	Rahel; Constance; Marko Budja	**Egon Werler**; Emily Lazarus; Kiara	Henriette Stieghan; Papuna; Rockzone
10	Álvaro Soler	Michi & Smudo	Lena Meyer-Landrut	Wincent Weiss
10	Benjamin Gedeon; Solveig Birta	**Georgia Balke**; Nadia Gonzalez Elasily; Vivien	Emil; Jemima Esteves	Benjamin N. Marvin
11	Andrea Milutinovic; Fiona Vargas; Adrian	**Emma Filipović**; Khady Doumbia; Eywa	Fia; Alexandra; Daniella Holzmann	Toby Schloesser; Ellice; Jayden Swingewood
12	Lana Melody; Madeleine	Frida; Malya	Anand Bansal; Maris Siegin	**Jakob Hebgen**; Erika Tanase
13	Wincent Weiss	Ayliva	Clueso	Stefanie Kloß
13	**Neo Klingl**; Tuana; Josh Blake	Eva; Ian Schneider; Malou	Sohum; Piet; Daryan	Luna; Helena; Arhanna Sandra Arbma
14	Álvaro Soler	Heiko & Roman Lochmann	Leony	Michael Patrick Kelly
14	Fabio; Susey Wendy; Danaya	Illia Konovchenko; Lionella Jakaj; Levy Müller	Max Behenský; Marie; Angelina	**Katelyn Harrington**; Hedi; Renat Popovschi
15	Mark Forster	Ayliva	Wincent Weiss	—N/a
15	Upcoming season			—N/a

== Series overview ==
Warning: the following table presents a significant amount of different colors.

Teams color key
Artist from Team Henning	Artist from Team Sasha	Artist from Team Deine Freunde
Artist from Team Lena	Artist from Team Nena & Larissa	Artist from Team Michi & Smudo
Artist from Team Tim	Artist from Team Max	Artist from Team Wincent
Artist from Team Johannes	Artist from Team BossHoss	Artist from Team Michael Patrick
Artist from Team Mark	Artist from Team Stefanie

German The Voice Kids series overview
Season	Aired	Winner	Other finalists			Winning coach	Presenter(s)
1	2013	Michèle Bircher	Rita Gueli	Tim Peltzer	—N/a	Henning Wehland	Thore Schölermann
2	2014	Danyiom Mesmer	Carlotta Truman	Richard Istel	—N/a	Henning Wehland	Thore Schölermann
3	2015	Noah-Levi Korth	Cosma Leonie	Zoë	—N/a	Lena Meyer-Landrut	Schölermann, Chantal Janzen
4	2016	Lukas Janisch	Ridon Jakupi	Shanice Özbicer	—N/a	Mark Forster	Schölermann, Chantal Janzen
5	2017	Sofie Thomas	Diana Donatella	Luca Kuglmeier	—N/a	Nena & Larissa	Schölermann, Debbie Schippers
6	2018	Anisa Celik	Benicio Bryant	Santiago Ghigani	—N/a	Mark Forster	Schölermann, Debbie Schippers
7	2019	Mimi & Josefin	Davit Nikalayan	Lea DeFrant	Thapelo Mashiane	The BossHoss	Schölermann, Melissa Khalaj
8	2020	Lisa-Marie Ramm	Leroy Erxleben	Nikolas Harrison	Phil Schaller	Sasha Schmitz	Schölermann, Melissa Khalaj
9	2021	Egon Werler	Note: Eleven artists finished second in season nine. (Note: Team Álvaro: Oscar & Mino Orué, Vivienne Hofmann, Isabella Paruzzo; Team Michi & Smudo: Marko Budja, Rahel, Constance; Team Stefanie: Kiara, Emily Lazarus; Team Wincent: Papuna, Rockzone, Henriette Stieghan.)			Stefanie Kloß	Schölermann, Melissa Khalaj
10	2022	Georgia Balke	Note: Eight artists finished second in season ten. (Note: Team Álvaro: Benjamin Gedeon, Solveig Birta; Team Michi & Smudo: Vivien, Nadia Gonzalez Elasily; Team Lena: Jemima Esteves, Emil; Team Wincent: Marvin, Benjamin N.)			Michi & Smudo	Schölermann, Melissa Khalaj
11	2023	Emma Filipović	Note: Eleven artists finished second in season eleven. (Note: Team Álvaro: Andrea Milutinovic, Fiona Vargas, Adrian; Team Michi & Smudo: Khady Doumbia, Eywa; Team Lena: Fia, Alexandra, Daniella Holzmann; Team Wincent: Toby Schloesser, Ellice, Jayden)			Michi & Smudo	Schölermann, Melissa Khalaj
12	2024	Jakob Hebgen	Note: Seven artists finished second in season twelve. (Note: Team Álvaro: Lana, Madeleine; Team Michi & Smudo: Frida, Malya; Team Lena: Anand Bansal, Maris Siegin; Team Wincent: Erika Tanase)			Wincent Weiss	Schölermann, Melissa Khalaj
13	2025	Neo Klingl	Note: Eleven artists finished second in season thirteen. (Note: Team Wincent: Josh Blake, Tuana; Team Ayliva: Eva, Ian Schneider, Malou; Team Clueso: Daryan, Piet, Sohum; Team Stefanie: Arhanna, Helena, Luna)			Wincent Weiss	Schölermann, Melissa Khalaj
14	2026	Katelyn Harrington	Note: Eleven artists finished second in season fourteen. (Note: Team Álvaro: Danaya, Fabio, Susey Wendy; Team HE/RO: Illia Konovchenko, Levy Müller, Lionella Jakaj; Team Leony: Angelina, Marie, Max Behenský; Team Michael Patrick: Hedi, Renat Popovschi)			Michael Patrick Kelly	Melissa Khalaj
15	2027	Upcoming season					Andrea Kaiser

== Seasons' synopsis ==
Winner
Runner-up
Third Place
Fourth Place
Fast pass to the Final
Eliminated in the Final
Stolen in the Sing-offs
Eliminated in the Sing-offs/Semifinals
Stolen in the Battles
Eliminated in the Battles
Eliminated in the Knockouts

=== Season 1 (2013) ===
The first season of The Voice Kids in Germany premiered on 5 April 2013 and ended on 10 May on Sat.1. The coaches were Tim Bendzko, Lena Meyer-Landrut and Henning Wehland. The inaugural season was hosted by Thore Schölermann. The winner was Swiss-born Michèle Bircher from Team Henning Wehland.

Coaches	Top 36 Kids			
Tim	Rita	Finn	Aitziber	Kieu
Tim	Alexandra	Dana	Gregory	Hannah Elisa
Tim	Lara Marie	Sarah	Sean	Thea
Lena	Tim	Aulona	Chelsea	Laurin
Lena	Emma	Judith	Laura	Lisa
Lena	Luisa	Mike	Nicole	Olivia
Henning	Michèle	Stéphanie	Fabienne	Maira
Henning	Alexandra	Giuliana & Gilliana	Iman	Julika
Henning	Louisa	Malin	Marie	Tim

=== Season 2 (2014) ===
The second season of The Voice Kids in Germany premiered on 21 March 2014 and ended on 9 May on Sat.1. Lena Meyer-Landrut and Henning Wehland returned for their second season as coaches. Johannes Strate completed the panel, replacing Tim Bendzko. Thore Schölermann returned for his second season as host. The winner was Danyiom Mesmer from Team Henning.

Coaches	Top 46 Kids			
Johannes	Carlotta	Jamica	Joel	Samuel
Johannes	Soufjan	Hannah	Leif	Nadine
Johannes	Pia	Renaz	Sabeschni	Sarah
Johannes	Tamara	Vanessa	Vanessa	
Lena	Richard	Selin	Lara	Naomi
Lena	Patrizia	Stepan	Caitlin	Helena
Lena	Jasmin	Julia	Lene	Lukas
Lena	Noah	Selma	Simon	Theodore
Henning	Daniyom	Hanna	Chiara	Larissa
Henning	Melissa	Alexandra	Amina	Carlo
Henning	Emmie Lee	Ilayda	Lukas	Michele
Henning	Naomi	Salvatore	Saphira	

=== Season 3 (2015) ===
The third season of The Voice Kids in Germany premiered on 27 February 2015 and ended on 24 April on Sat.1. Lena Meyer-Landrut returned for her third season as coach, and Johannes Strate returned for his second season as coach. Mark Forster completed the panel, replacing Henning Wehland. Thore Schölermann returned for his third season as host. The winner was Noah-Levi Korth from Team Lena.

Coaches	Top 45 Kids				
Johannes	Cosma	Nestor	Anna	Sophie	Tamino
Johannes	Alperen	Amber	Angelina	Duy	Elinor
Johannes	Jorena	Julian	Julie	Liv	Solomia
Lena	Noah-Levi	Samuel	Linnea	Molly Sue	Tilman
Lena	Dave	Eleni	Joli	Loredana	Luca
Lena	Luna	Michele	Paulina	Renée	Rika
Mark	Zoë	Antonia	Emil	Lukas	Samira
Mark	Alberina	Alina	Benita	Christin	Joana
Mark	Keanu	Leonie	Lorena	Malte	Simon

=== Season 4 (2016) ===
The fourth season of The Voice Kids in Germany premiered on 5 February 2016 and ended on 25 March on Sat.1. Lena Meyer-Landrut returned for her fourth season as coach, and Mark Forster returned for his second season as coach. Sasha Schmitz completed the panel, replacing Johannes Strate. Thore Schölermann returned for his fourth season as host. The winner was Lukas Janisch from Team Mark.

Coaches	Top 45 Kids				
Sasha	Shanice	Noël	Felix	Sofia	Theo
Sasha	Amaro	Amely	Emily	Eray	Ilan
Sasha	Jette	Maxime	Maximilian	Samira	Theresa
Lena	Ridon	Matteo Markus	Magdalina	Melisa	Yassine
Lena	The Anh	Claudia	Emma	Gabriele	Jessy
Lena	Leilani	Matteo	Merdan	Robin	Shayene
Mark	Lukas	Lara	Anne	Hala	Patrik
Mark	Can	Chiara	Chiara	Indra	Jaimy
Mark	Maria	Sanie	Sanja	Tom	Wilson

=== Season 5 (2017) ===
The fifth season of The Voice Kids in Germany premiered on 5 February 2017 and ended on 26 March on Sat.1. Mark Forster returned for his third season as coach, and Sasha Schmitz returned for his second season as coach. Former coach from the adult version, Nena and her daughter Larissa Kerner completed the panel as a duo coach replacing Lena Meyer-Landrut. Thore Schölermann returned for his fifth season as host. The winner was Sofie Thomas from Team Nena & Larissa.

Coaches	Top 45 Kids					
Sasha	Luca	Leonie	Marie-Sophie	~~Eric~~	Zeynep	Zoe
Sasha	Anastasia	Andreas	Evgenia	Jacqueline	Marin	Miran
Sasha	Nick	Nora	Roman & Michael	Tara		
Nena & Larissa	Sofie	Leon	Pia	Camilla	Grace	Zoé-Loes
Nena & Larissa	Andrej	Chiara	Jacqueline & Jeanette	Julia	Leah	Matteo
Nena & Larissa	Natalie	Neha	Samuel	Sarah		
Mark	Diana	Eric	Lina	~~Leonie~~	~~Pia~~	Ruben
Mark	Anais	Ashley	Elvira	Iggi	Kayan	Leon
Mark	Markus	Michael	Nele	Nils		
Note: Italicized names are stolen artists from the Sing-offs (names struck through within former teams).

=== Season 6 (2018) ===
The sixth season of The Voice Kids in Germany premiered on 11 February 2018 and ended on 15 April on Sat.1. Mark Forster returned for his fourth season as coach, while Nena & Larissa Kerner returned for their second season as coaches. The Voice of Germany season 1 finalist Max Giesinger joined the panel as a new coach replacing Sascha Schmitz. Thore Schölermann returned for his sixth season as host. The winner was Anisa Celik from Team Mark.

Coaches	Top 54 Kids						
Mark	Anisa	Klaas	Oliwia	~~Jonah~~	Charlotte	Jil	Julian
Mark	Chiara	Daria	Eliza	Gabriel	Kayla	Leni	Lucas
Mark	Marissa	Pepe	Philias	Shayan	Sienna		
Nena & Larissa	Santiago	Alycia	Natalia Joy	~~Oliwia~~	Emma	Josephine	Sarah
Nena & Larissa	Bjarne	Christian	Cristian	Emily	Friederike	Gina-Maria	Lea
Nena & Larissa	Lily-Marie	Melisa	Sara	Tim	Zlata		
Max	Benicio	Flavio	Jonah	~~Natalia Joy~~	Dimitrios	Jouline	Phil
Max	Besim	Diana	Joey	Jule	Lena	Lisa	Marcel
Max	Maxima	Nadin	Nina	Selina	Samuele		
Note: Italicized names are stolen artists from the Sing-offs (names struck through within former teams).

=== Season 7 (2019) ===
The seventh season of The Voice Kids in Germany premiered on 17 February 2019 on Sat.1. For the first time in the show's history, the coaching panel would consist of four coaches instead of three. Mark Forster was joined by Lena Meyer-Landrut who returned after a two-season hiatus, with Stefanie Kloß and The BossHoss joining as new coaches. This is also the first season wherein there are two female coaches in the panel. Thore Schölermann returned for his seventh season as host, with Melissa Khalaj as the new host replacing Debbie Schippers. Iggy Kelly joined as new Backstage-Online. The winners were sisters Mimi & Josefin from Team BossHoss.

Coaches	Top 60 Kids				
Mark	Davit	Teodora	Cedrik	Hala	Theodor
Mark	Elena	Evin	Idalia	Jenai	Leon
Mark	Miracle	Mondia	Nils	Peter	Sila
Stefanie	Lea	Lazaros	Anna	Nelli	Orlando
Stefanie	Cora	David	Evanthia	Evelyne	Fiona
Stefanie	Jonna	Nils	Theresa	Tim	Remy
BossHoss	Mimi & Josefin	Erik	Abigail	Ruza	Tapiwa
BossHoss	Franz	Greta	Helena	Isabelle	Joshua
BossHoss	Kimberly	Kira	Laura-Céline	Nico	Philipp
Lena	Thapelo	Dio	Leonie	Lilo	Nino
Lena	Elena	Eske	Jorden	Kyria	Lana
Lena	Lara	Luana	Magbule	Max	Nevio

=== Season 8 (2020) ===
The eighth season of The Voice Kids in Germany premiered on 23 February 2020 on Sat.1. Lena Meyer-Landrut was joined by Max Giesinger, who last coached in the sixth season, Sasha Schmitz, who last coached two seasons prior, and with the new duo coach Lukas Nimscheck & Flo Sump (Deine Freunde). Thore Schölermann returned for his eighth season and Melissa Khalaj returned for her second season as hosts. However, the backstage moderators were new: Last year's winners, the sibling duo Mimi & Josefin, returned to the music show in this function. The winner was Lisa-Marie Ramm from Team Sasha. The live shows were filmed at an empty auditorium following Germany's COVID-19 pandemic.

Coaches	Top 60 Kids				
Max	Phil	Gianna	Luc	Nils	Paula
Max	Alija	Anja	Benedikta	Cathleen	Charis & Joleen
Max	Daantje	Daniella	Mats	Mayumi	Michelle
Lena	Nikolas	Liana	Bjondi	Reza	Suzan
Lena	Anna	Bouchra	Enno	Kira Mae	Luca
Lena	Mariebelle	Renata	Vladi	Yaiza	Yike
Deine Freunde	Leroy	Paula Sophie	Anastasija	David	Sila
Deine Freunde	Brianna	Brinn	Elin	Henry	Learta
Deine Freunde	Mireille	Rebeca	Rosalie	Stella	Tina
Sasha	Lisa-Marie	Marc	Jason	Nora Arvena	Timur
Sasha	Bjorn	Coco	Igor	Kathrin	Lilyana
Sasha	Marius	Miguel	Naima	Rune	Vivwareeya

=== Season 9 (2021) ===
The ninth season of The Voice Kids in Germany premiered on 27 February 2021 on Sat.1. On November 15, 2020, it was announced that Stefanie Kloß would return for her second season of the series, after one-season hiatus. Kloß was joined by former The Voice of Germany duo coach Michi & Smudo, and by debutants Álvaro Soler and Wincent Weiss. Hosting, Thore Schölermann returned for his ninth season and Melissa Khalaj returned for her third season. The backstage host for the ninth season was Keanu Rapp, who was as a participant in the third season. The winner was Egon Werler from Team Stefanie.

Coaches	Top 60 Kids					
Álvaro	Isabella	Oscar & Mino	Vivienne	Hassan	Ibrahim	Sezin
Álvaro	Aanvi	Hannes	Katarina	Mariam	Maya	Saralynn
Álvaro	Sven	Tuana	Veronika, Moritz & Xavier	Viktoria		
Michi & Smudo	Constance	Marko	Rahel	Daria	Johannes	Lenny
Michi & Smudo	~~Joshua~~	Amy	Batteries of Rock	Ben	Elisa	Jessica
Michi & Smudo	Rio	The Rockets	Sebastian	Tom		
Stefanie	Egon	Emily	Kiara	Adriano	Joshua	Sefidin
Stefanie	~~Ibrahim~~	~~Rockzone~~	Alicia & Jasmina	Arthur	Grace	Jellina
Stefanie	Johanna	Leila	Michel	Michelle		
Wincent	Henriette	Papuna	Rockzone	Alma	Giada	Marie
Wincent	~~Daria~~	Anton	Chris	Elisabeth	Emily	Fabio
Wincent	Katharina	Kirstin	Lorena	Nicklas		
Note: Italicized names are stolen artists from the Battles (names struck through within former teams). Underlined names are artists who received the Fast Pass in the battles and directly advanced to the finale.

=== Season 10 (2022) ===
The tenth season of The Voice Kids in Germany premiered on 4 March 2022 on Sat.1. On 31 October 2021, it was announced that duo coach Michi & Smudo, Álvaro Soler and Wincent Weiss would all return for their second respective seasons, alongside Lena Meyer-Landrut who returned after a one-season hiatus. Hosting, Thore Schölermann returned for his tenth season and Melissa Khalaj returned for her fourth season. Keanu Rapp returned as backstage host for the tenth season, alongside season nine winner Egon Werler.

This season featured "All-Star" performances during the audition phase, including Mike Singer (S1), Chiara Castelli (S2), LOI (S5), and Benicio Bryant (S6). Past coaches Henning and Max appeared as well during the performances of Chiara and Benicio respectively.

This season was also known for multiple concerns resulting in additional quarantines. During the battles phase, coach Lena was only able to prepare via videochat, while coaches Smudo and Alvaro had to appear during the battles themselves via video. Alongside this, a multitude of contestants were unable to participate in the battles due to quarantine, including 2 members of De Breaks, Georgia, Lisa of Lisa & Lucy, Liv, Maiara, and Nina. Georgia, Liv, Maiara and Nina participated in a "Community Ticket" where one would get voted by the public to the finals (won by Georgia), while De Breaks and Lucy had to partake in battles without their remaining group members (where both acts lost their battles). De Breaks and Lisa & Lucy would later perform as full groups during the finals as guests.

The winner was Georgia Balke from Team Michi & Smudo.

Coaches	Top 60 Kids				
Álvaro	Benjamin	Solveig	Carla	Nanna	Shanice
Álvaro	Ben	David	Hans	Kiara	Laila
Álvaro	Lisa & Hanna	Marlene	Raoul	Svenja	Taylor
Michi & Smudo	Georgia	Nadia	Vivien	Michelle	Nelly
Michi & Smudo	Paul	Alice	De Breaks	Gloria	Katharina
Michi & Smudo	Lavinia	Lilli	Lisa & Lucy	Maja	Raschel
Lena	Emil	Jemima	Lara	Paulina	Rebeca
Lena	Alina	Anjeza	Charly	Felicia	Lara
Lena	Liv	Luis	Maiara	Sarah	Till
Wincent	Benjamin	Marvin	Berenike	Gabriel	Nejla
Wincent	Ayleen	Hannah	Helena	Keyan	Maurice
Wincent	Nina	Nina	Rebecca	Thao	Tyler

=== Season 11 (2023) ===
The eleventh season of The Voice Kids in Germany premiered on 10 March 2023 on Sat.1. Álvaro Soler, Michi & Smudo, Lena Meyer-Landrut, and Wincent Weiss all returned as coaches. Hosting, Thore Schölermann returned for his eleventh season and Melissa Khalaj returned for her fifth season. This season, for the first time, the Battles and Sing-offs were axed. Replacing these rounds was the Knockouts, where three artists from each team moved directly to the finale. Emma Filipović was announced as the winner of the season, marking Michi & Smudo's second and consecutive win on The Voice Kids. With Michi & Smudo's win, they became the only coach in The Voice of Germany history to win more than 3 times. Additionally, Michi & Smudo became the only coach in both the kids and main adult version to win consecutive seasons.

Coaches	Top 60 Kids				
Álvaro	Fiona	Andrea	Adrian	Dominik	David
Álvaro	Katharina	Svea	Hannah	Manon	Anja & Jana
Álvaro	Yumi	Blanche	Joyce	Thinarie	Lara
Michi & Smudo	Emma	Khady	Eywa	Damian	Hans
Michi & Smudo	Lui	Aaliyah	Chapter X	Cajus	Brianna
Michi & Smudo	Amelie	Lotte	Lotta	Amira	Valentin & Matti
Lena	Fia	Alexandra	Daniella	Julius	Moritz
Lena	Valentina	Amira	Nathalie	Melaniia	Felix
Lena	Miya	Anna	Roberta	Eliana	Martha & Norah
Wincent	Ellice	Toby	Jayden	Tom	João
Wincent	Milo	Jette	Mia	Luca	Malina
Wincent	Jolien	Mia	Luis & Mathis	Melanie	Marie

=== Season 12 (2024) ===
The twelfth season of The Voice Kids in Germany premiered on 15 March 2024 exclusively on Joyn, with the regular broadcast beginning on 22 March 2024 on Sat.1. Álvaro Soler, Michi & Smudo, Lena Meyer-Landrut, and Wincent Weiss all returned as coaches. Hosting, Thore Schölermann returned for his twelfth season and Melissa Khalaj returned for her sixth season. The Knockouts round that was introduced in the previous season was axed, and the Battles and Sing-offs returned. Additionally, in the Battles, each coach had one "steal" to recruit a losing member of a battle from another team onto their team. The winner was Jakob Hebgen from Team Wincent.

Coaches	Top 48 Kids				
Álvaro	Lana	Madeleine	Simón	Tristan	Victoria
Álvaro	~~Bellamore~~	~~Yuval~~	Isa	Noah	Leon
Álvaro	Maikel	Anabel	Paloma		
Michi & Smudo	Frida	Malya	Bellamore	Jana	Kai
Michi & Smudo	Nahla	Maleen	Lilian	Linus	Lilly
Michi & Smudo	Carmen	Anna	Lilly		
Lena	Anand	Maris	Bjarne	Lina	Miray
Lena	~~Tristan~~	Leonardo	Tilda	Anabel	Alexandra
Lena	Rosa	Emilia	Fiona		
Wincent	Jakob	Erika	Christina	Rosalie	Yuval
Wincent	~~Maris~~	Greta	Lennart	Antonia	Lucas
Wincent	Erik	Riley	Franz		
Note: Italicized names are stolen artists from the Battles (names struck through within former teams).

=== Season 13 (2025) ===
The thirteenth season of The Voice Kids in Germany premiered on 21 February 2025. In October 2024, it was announced that of the coaches from the twelfth season, only Wincent Weiss would return. On 6 November 2024, it was announced that Stefanie Kloß would return to the panel after a three-season hiatus alongside new coaches Clueso and Ayliva. With Michi & Smudo leaving The Voice Kids, the thirteenth season was the first season since season four to not feature any duo coaches. In addition, this was only the second season in the history of the show to feature two female coaches, following season seven. Hosting, Thore Schölermann returned for his thirteenth season and Melissa Khalaj returned for her seventh season.

A new button was added this season, similar to the "block buzzer" from The Voice of Germany: the "mute buzzer". This allows a coach to mute his/her competition and be the only one to speak to the artist. This can happen any time, during or after the performance. Additionally, the Battles were axed once more and the Knockouts round from season 11 returned.

The winner was Neo Klingl from Team Wincent.

Coaches	Top 51 Kids				
Wincent	Neo	Josh	Tuana	Alwin	Fabian
Wincent	Anna	Ananthu	Nele	Nikolas	Salvatore
Wincent	Sofia	Sophie	Viktoria		
Ayliva	Eva	Ian	Malou	Athanasios	Maximilian
Ayliva	Alissia	Cataleya	Ella	Emily	Leonie
Ayliva	Angelina	Luca	Sanvi		
Clueso	Daryan	Piet	Sohum	Elias	Jamil
Clueso	Anna	Christian	Lena	Liva	Madelene
Clueso	Marlene	Vincent	Volodymyr		
Stefanie	Arhanna	Helena	Luna	Max	Jonas
Stefanie	Dana & Fabrice	Claudius	Lilo	Mariana	Ava
Stefanie	Neila	Tabea			

=== Season 14 (2026) ===
The fourteenth season of The Voice Kids in Germany premiered on 14 February 2026. On 5 November, it was announced that Thore Schölermann would not be returning as the presenter of the show after 13 seasons. The following day, Wincent Weiss announced that he would be taking a break from the show, after serving 5 seasons as a coach. On 13 November 2025, it was announced that Álvaro Soler would return as a coach after a one-season hiatus. At the same time, it was announced that Leony, The Voice of Germany season 8 and The Voice Senior season 2 coach Michael Patrick Kelly, and Heiko & Roman Lochmann would debut as coaches. This marks the second complete panel change from the previous season, following season 9. The battles returned once more, replacing the knockouts from the previous season. The winner was Katelyn Harrington from Team Michael Patrick.

Coaches	Top 48 Kids			
Álvaro
Álvaro	Danaya	Fabio	Susey	Valentin
Álvaro	Cataleya	Ariana	Nina & Roman	Ruben
Álvaro	Sofia	Ella	Jamie	Sarah
Heiko & Roman
Heiko & Roman	Illia	Levy	Lionella	Laurin
Heiko & Roman	Maja	Sophia & Valentina	Iman	Lani
Heiko & Roman	Lionel	Elena	Liam	Nisa
Leony
Leony	Angelina	Max	Marie	Elias
Leony	Linsay	Nele	Giulia	Helena
Leony	Noah	Alina	Katharina	Lena
Michael Patrick
Michael Patrick	Katelyn	Hedi	Renat	Johannes
Michael Patrick	Davide	Rowan	Gina	Lilith
Michael Patrick	Marlene	Fiona	Nivedh	Pablo

=== Season 15 (2027) ===
The fifteenth season of The Voice Kids in Germany will premiere in early 2027. On 3 October 2026, it was announced that Melissa Khalaj would not be returning as the presenter of the show. Simultaneously, Andrea Kaiser was announced as her replacement. On 20 November 2026, it was announced that the coaching panel would consist of Mark Forster, who returns after seven-season hiatus; Wincent Weiss; who returns after a one-season hiatus; and Ayliva, who also returns after a one-season hiatus. This marks the third complete panel change from the previous season, following season 9 and the previous season. Additionally, this season is the first since season 6 to only feature three coaches.

Coaches	Top 36 Kids
Mark
Ayliva
Wincent
