= Smudo =

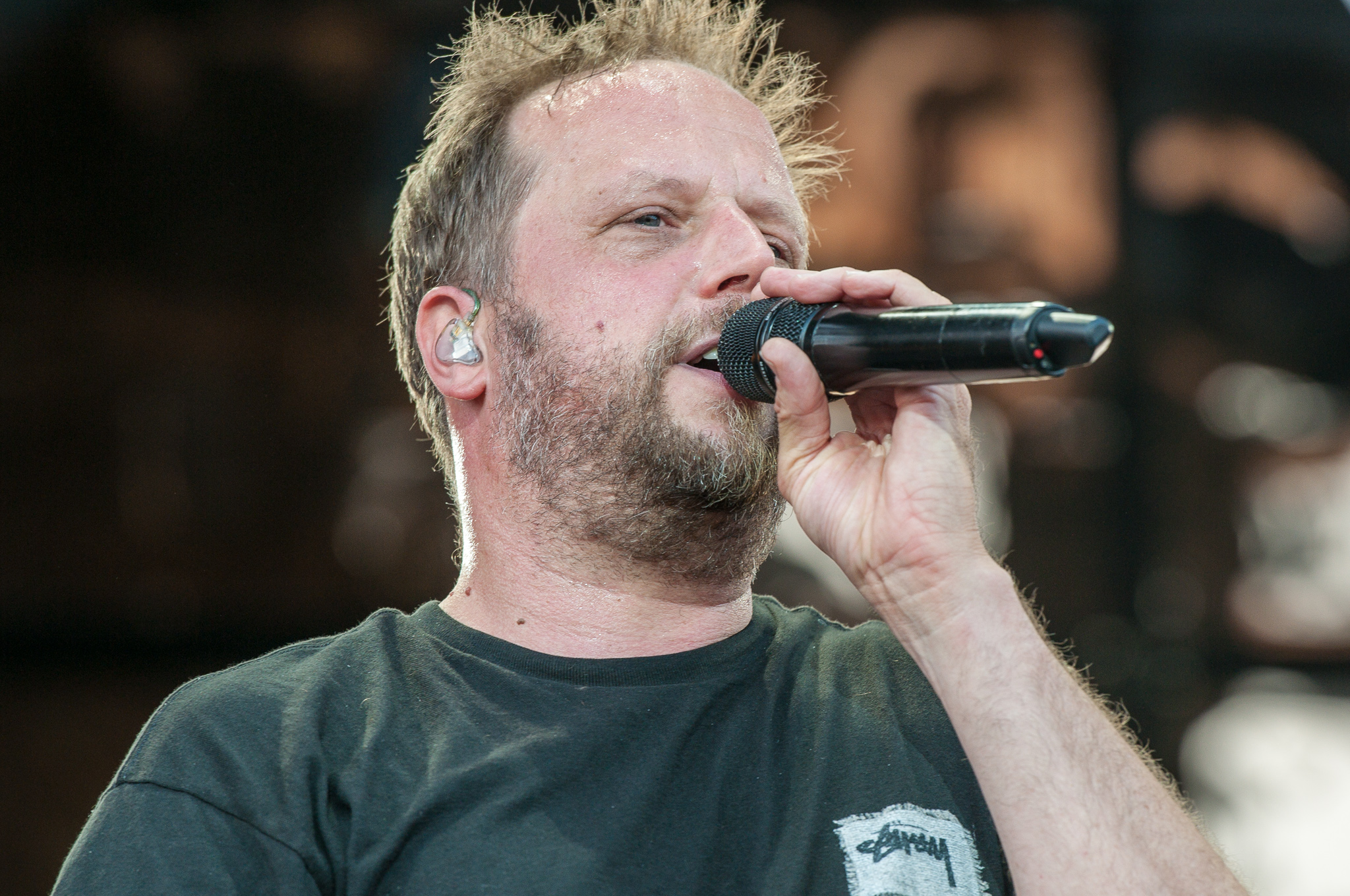
- Smudo in 2014

Background information
- Born: Michael Bernd Schmidt; 6 March 1968 (age 58); Offenbach am Main, West Germany
- Genre: German hip hop
- Occupations: Rapper, songwriter
- Member of: Die Fantastischen Vier

Michael Bernd Schmidt (German pronunciation: [ˈmɪçaʔeːl bɛʁnt ˈʃmɪt]; born 6 March 1968), better known as Smudo, is a German rapper and songwriter in the hip hop group Die Fantastischen Vier. He has been part of the group for more than 30 years.

During the COVID-19 pandemic, Smudo was involved in the development of the Luca app for contact tracing in Germany. He has appeared on The Voice of Germany and the German version of The Voice Kids as part of a judging and coaching duo with fellow musician Michi Beck. While on the respective shows, they coached Charley Ann Schmutzler, Jamie-Lee Kriewitz, Georgia Balke and Emma Filipović to victory, making them so far the coaches with the most wins (four) on both shows combined.
