= HE/RO =

German band

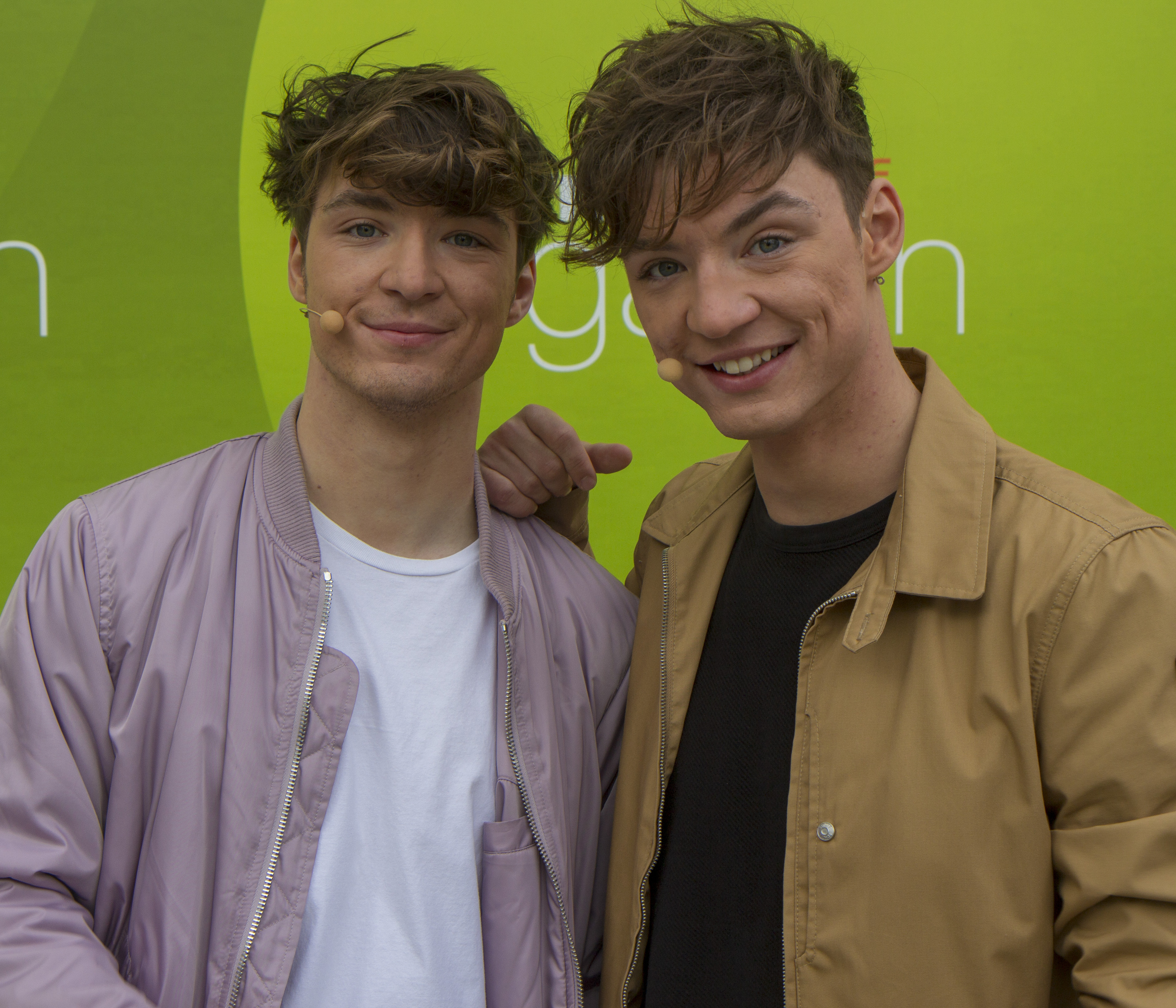
- HE/RO in 2019

Background information
- Origin: Mainz, Germany
- Genres: Pop; Pop-Rock; Pop Punk
- Occupations: Singers; YouTubers
- Years active: 2011–present
- Members: Roman Lochmann; Heiko Lochmann

HE/RO (until 2019 Die Lochis) are a German music duo of the twin brothers Heiko and Roman Lochmann (born 13 May 1999). The duo gained fame through their YouTube career, in which they initially published song translations and parodies of well-known chart hits as well as comedy sketches. Since their initial rise to fame, the duo shifted primarily to the pop genre, have made several television appearances, and have been active in philanthropic activities.

== Career ==
=== Social media career ===
On 24 August 2011, twin brothers Roman and Heiko Lochmann founded the YouTube channel DieLochis, on which they initially published mainly song translations and parodies of well-known chart hits. In 2012, they received the Audience Award of the German Web Video Award in the category "Newbie". After various television reports and regular publications, the number of subscribers and views continued rising. On 26 October 2014, the brothers' main channel reached one million subscribers. In March 2017, it ranked 18th among the most subscribed YouTube channels in Germany.

=== Musical career ===
In August 2013, the duo reached the German single charts for the first time with their single "Durchgehend Online". On 1 March 2014, they released the single "Ich bin blank", which entered at number 34 of the German single charts. The singles "Sonnenschein", "Mein letzte Tag", "Klartext" and "Ab geht's" followed. At the beginning of January 2015, the duo completed their first live tour, the "Lochiversum Tour" through Germany and Switzerland. As Die Lochis, they released their debut album, #Zwilling, on 19 August 2016, followed by the works #whatislife and Kapitel X in 2018 and 2019, respectively. Following their rebrand to HE/RO, the duo has released three albums Teen Star Dilemma (2022) and Kein Grund zur Panik (2025). Both albums were released through Columbia Records following their signing to the label.

=== Television appearances ===
In 2018, the duo participated in the 11th season of the RTL show Let's Dance, with Heiko finishing in 11th place together with Kathrin Menzinger, and Roman in 8th Place with Katja Kalugina. Also in 2018, they participated in Ninja Warrior Germany celebrity special for the RTL donation marathon.

In 2024, they competed (as flip flops) on the ProSieben show The Masked Singer and finished as the runner-up of the season.

In 2026, the brothers debuted as a duo coach on the fourteenth season of The Voice Kids alongside Álvaro Soler, Leony, and Michael Patrick Kelly.

=== Philanthropy ===
Since 2014, Heiko and Roman Lochmann have been involved as campaign ambassadors for the international education initiative Youth Against AIDS.

== Discography ==
List of studio albums, with selected details
Title	Details
#Zwilling	Released: 19 August 2016 (GER); Label: Independent
#whatislife	Released: 31 August 2018 (GER); Label: Warner Music Group
Kapitel X	Released: 13 September 2019 (GER); Label: Warner Music Group
Teen Star Dilemma	Released: 13 May 2022 (GER); Label: Columbia Records
Kein Grund zur Panik	Released: 17 January 2025 (GER); Label: Columbia Records
