= Georgia Balke =

German singer

- Born: c. 2010; Germany
- Occupation: Singer

Georgia Balke (born c. 2010) is a German singer. She is the winner of Season 10 of The Voice Kids which premiered on March 4, 2022. The 11-year-old Georgia from Bremerhaven competed on the team coached by Michi & Smudo. She won the competition on May 6, 2022. Prior to this, she was the runner up of Season 13 of Das Supertalent (Germany's Got Talent).
