= Andrea Kaiser =

German television presenter (born 1982)

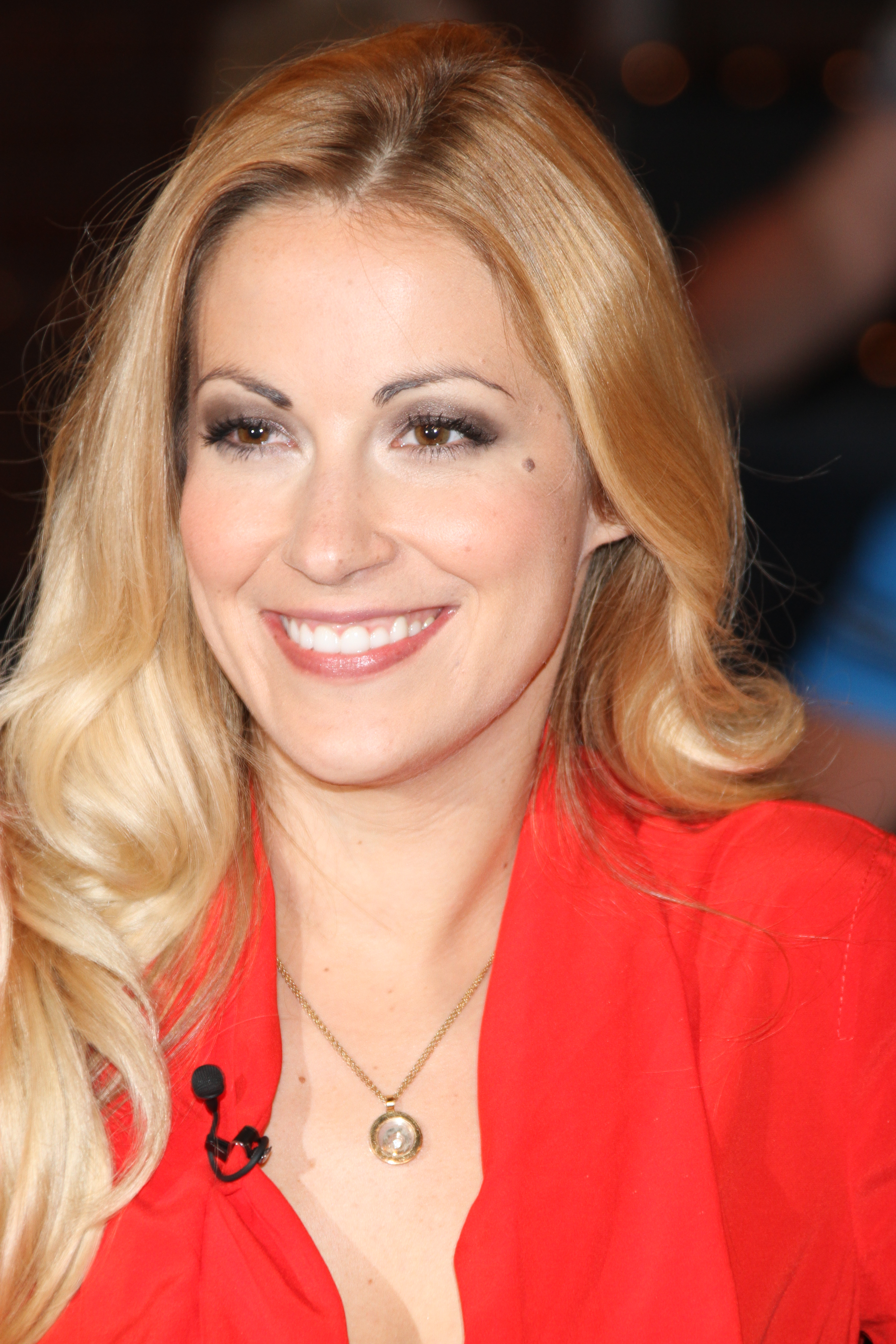
- Kaiser in 2012
- Born: 13 February 1982 (age 44); Munich, Bavaria, Germany
- Occupation: Television presenter
- Years active: 1996–present
- Spouse(s): Lars Ricken (m. 2010–2013) Sébastien Ogier (m. 2014)
- Children: 1

Andrea Kaiser (born 13 February 1982) is a German television presenter.

== Television career ==
Kaiser began in 1996 on the local radio station Radio Arabella in München and then worked as a television presenter. She began presenting the programs Weck Up on Sat.1 and Tabaluga tivi on ZDF. She later presented the programs DSF aktuell (now called Sport1 News) and Bundesliga aktuell on channel DSF (now called Sport1). Since summer 2009, she has been working for ProSiebenSat.1 Media, where she presented for ran various sport events on channel Sat.1 and Kabel eins. In early 2011, she presented with Alexander Wesselsky the television series Fort Boyard, and since August 2011 the ranking show 32Eins!.

Since July 2015, Kaiser presents the television series Die wunderbare Welt der Tierbabys on Sat.1. In January 2017, she was part of the team Moderatoren on the game show Duell der Stars – Die Sat.1 Promiarena.

== Personal life ==
On 9 July 2010, Kaiser married former Borussia Dortmund football player Lars Ricken, whom she had been dating since early 2009. On 2 August 2013, it was announced that Kaiser and Ricken had separated. Soon after, Kaiser announced her new relationship with French rally driver Sébastien Ogier. They married in summer 2014 and became parents of a son named Tim on 13 June 2016.

Kaiser has sympathized with the football club SpVgg Unterhaching and is also a fan of Hannover 96.
