= Silbermond discography =

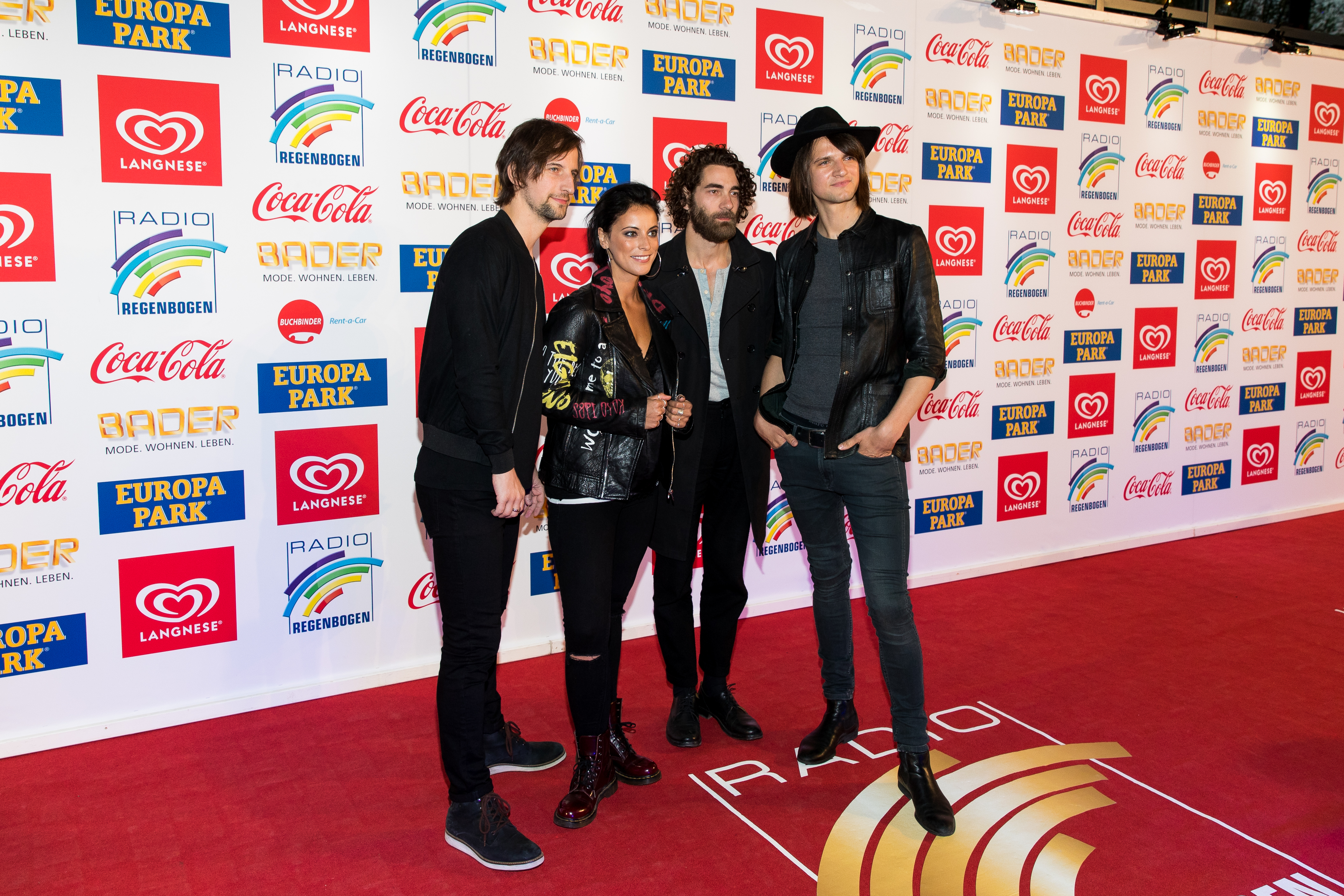
- Silbermond at the Radio Regenbogen Awards 2017.
- Studio albums: 6
- Compilation albums: 1
- Singles: 20

German pop rock band Silbermond has released six studio albums, one compilation albums, and twenty singles (including two as a featured artist). In 2004, their record company Sony BMG requested the quartet to record and release skate punk song "Mach's dir selbst" as their debut single; the song underperformed on the charts. Months later, second single "Durch die Nacht" became a top twenty hit on the German Singles Chart and prompted the label to release Silbermond's debut album Verschwende deine Zeit (2004). A major success, it reached the top five in Austria and Germany, where it was certified platinum and 7× gold, respectively. Ballad "Symphonie", the album's third single, became the group's first top five hit.

Laut gedacht, the group's second album, was released in April 2006. As with "Das Beste", the album's third single and Silbermond's first number-one hit, it reached the top of the charts in Austria and Germany and was eventually certified 3× platinum by the Bundesverband Musikindustrie (BVMI). In Switzerland, it peaked at number three. Third album Nichts passiert, released in March 2009, debuted atop the Austrian, German, and Swiss Albums Charts. It produced three singles, including "Irgendwas bleibt", Silbermond's second number-one hit, and "Krieger des Lichts", which reached the top ten in Germany.

In 2012, fourth studio album Himmel auf was released. A top three success, it was reached gold status in Austria and 3× gold status in Germany. Its same-titled debut single peaked within the top five in Germany. In 2014, Alles auf Anfang 2014–04, Silbermond's first compilation was released. It reached the top ten in Austria and Switzerland and was certified gold by the BVMI. The same year, the band collaborated with Band Aid 30 Germany on a remake of "Do They Know It's Christmas?", which became another number-one hit in Germany. Leichtes Gepäck, the group's fifth album, was released in November 2015. Recorded in Nashville, it reached the top five in Germany and Switzerland.

== Albums ==
=== Studio albums ===
List of albums, with selected chart positions and certifications
Title	Album details	Peak chart positions				Certifications
Title	Album details	GER	AUT	SWI	EU	Certifications
Verschwende deine Zeit	Released: 12 July 2004; Label: Valicon; Formats: CD	3	4	18	28	AUT: Platinum; GER: 7× Gold; SWI: Gold
Laut gedacht	Released: 21 April 2006; Label: Valicon; Formats: CD, digital download	1	1	3	—	AUT: Platinum; GER: 3× Platinum; SWI: Platinum
Nichts passiert	Released: 20 March 2009; Label: Valicon; Formats: CD, digital download, LP	1	1	1	98	AUT: Platinum; GER: 7× Gold; SWI: Platinum
Himmel auf	Released: 23 March 2012; Label: Valicon; Formats: CD, digital download	2	2	3	—	AUT: Gold; GER: 3× Gold
Leichtes Gepäck	Released: 27 November 2015; Label: Verschwende Deine Zeit; Formats: CD, digital download, LP	4	7	3	—	GER: Platinum
Schritte	Released: 15 November 2019; Label: Verschwende Deine Zeit; Formats: CD, digital download, LP	1	5	4	—	
Auf Auf	Released: 2 June 2023; Label: Verschwende Deine Zeit; Formats: CD, digital download, LP	1	11	7	—	

=== Compilation albums ===
List of albums, with selected chart positions and certifications
Title	Album details	Peak chart positions				Certifications
Title	Album details	GER	AUT	SWI	EU	Certifications
Alles auf Anfang 2014–04	Released: November 18, 2014; Label: Valicon; Formats: CD, digital download, LP	4	11	6	—	GER: Gold

== Singles ==
=== As lead artist ===
Year	Title	Chart positions			Album
Year	Title	GER	AUT	SWI	Album
2004	"Mach's dir selbst"	56	—	—	Verschwende deine Zeit
2004	"Durch die Nacht"	20	53	—	Verschwende deine Zeit
2004	"Symphonie"	5	4	56	Verschwende deine Zeit
2005	"Zeit für Optimisten"	18	30	42	Verschwende deine Zeit
2006	"Unendlich"	10	14	23	Laut gedacht
2006	"Meer sein"	32	36	69	Laut gedacht
2006	"Das Beste"	1	1	3	Laut gedacht
2007	"Das Ende vom Kreis"	27	—	—	Laut gedacht
2009	"Irgendwas bleibt"	1	2	1	Nichts passiert
2009	"Ich bereue nichts"	20	30	79	Nichts passiert
2009	"Krieger des Lichts"	8	23	63	Nichts passiert
2010	"Here We Go Again"/"Unendlich" (with Jenix)	48	—	—	non-album release
2012	"Himmel auf"	5	6	21	Himmel auf
2012	"Für dich schlägt mein Herz"	53	69	—	Himmel auf
2012	"Ja"	13	31	26	Himmel auf
2015	"Leichtes Gepäck"	13	19	30	Leichtes Gepäck
2016	"Das Leichteste der Welt"	69	—	—	Leichtes Gepäck
2020	"Machen wir das Beste draus (Home Recordings)"	69	—	—	non-album release

=== As featured artist ===
Year	Title	Chart positions			Album
Year	Title	GER	AUT	SWI	Album
2008	"Bis zum Schluss" (with Curse)	7	21	49	Freiheit
2014	"Do They Know It's Christmas?" (with Band Aid 30 Germany)	1	10	21	non-album release
