= The Voice Kids (German TV series) season 14 =

Season of television series

The Voice Kids
- Season 14
- Promotional poster featuring coaches Kelly, Leony, HE/RO, and Soler
- Hosted by: Melissa Khalaj
- Coaches: Álvaro Soler; Heiko & Roman Lochmann; Leony; Michael Patrick Kelly
- Winner: Katelyn Harrington
- Winning coach: Michael Patrick Kelly

Release
- Original network: JOYN; Sat.1
- Original release: 14 February – 3 April 2026

Season chronology
- ← Previous; Season 13

The fourteenth season of the talent show The Voice Kids premiered on 14 February 2026 on JOYN and Sat.1.

Álvaro Soler returned as a coach after a one-season hiatus and was joined by Heiko & Roman Lochmann, Leony, and Michael Patrick Kelly. This season marks the second season on the Kids version to have all four coaches from the previous season replaced, following season 9. Melissa Khalaj returned for her eighth season as host, but was a solo host this season following Thore Schölermann's departure from the show after thirteen seasons.

Katelyn Harrington from Team Michael Patrick won the competition on 3 April 2026. Her victory marked Michael Patrick Kelly's first win as a coach on The Voice Kids (second total after his win on the eighth season of The Voice of Germany). With Harrington's win, Kelly became the third coach on The Voice Kids to win on their debut season following Nena & Larissa and The BossHoss; however, Kelly became the first solo coach to accomplish this.

== Panelists ==
=== Coaches ===
The Voice Kids Germany season 14 coaches

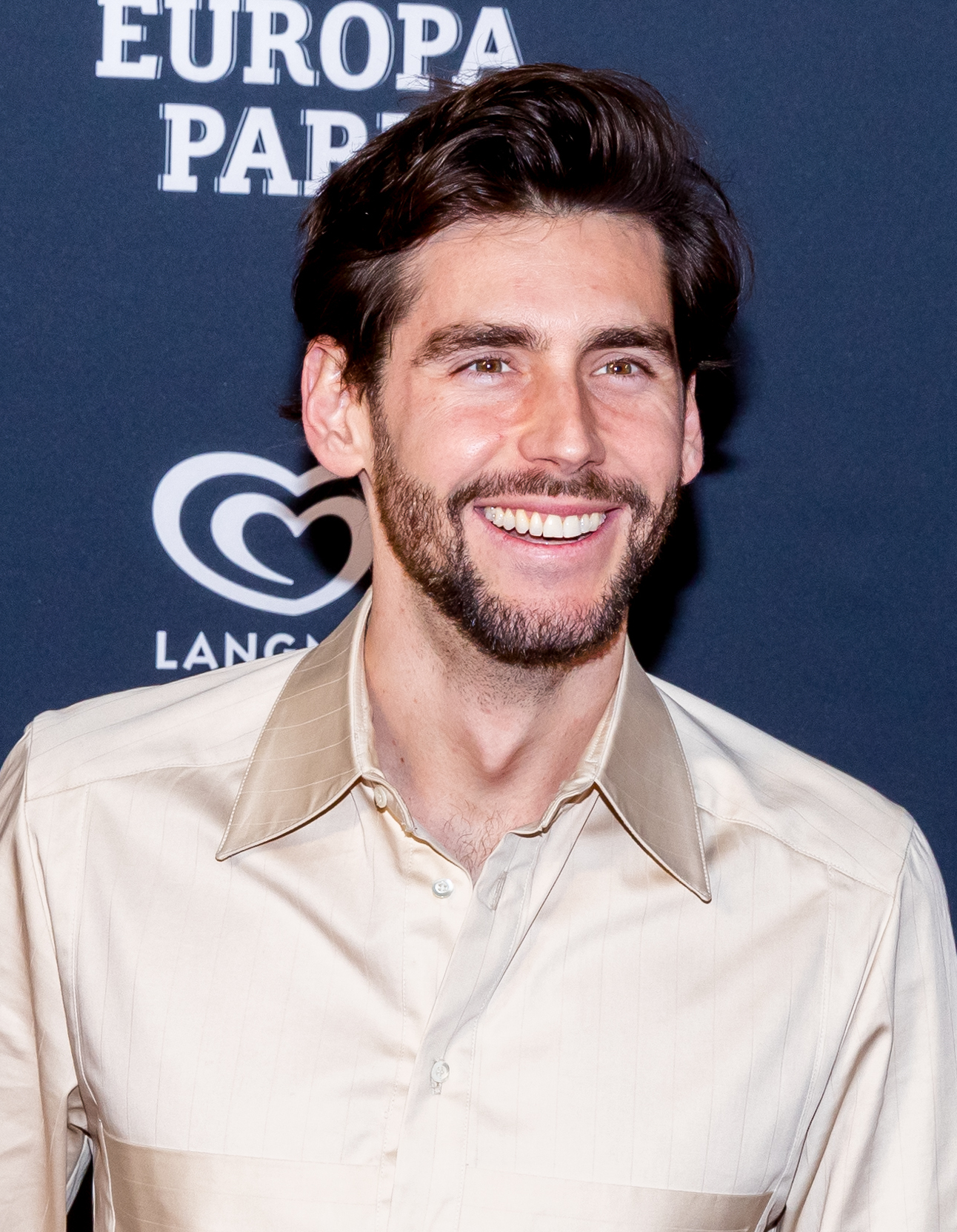
Álvaro Soler

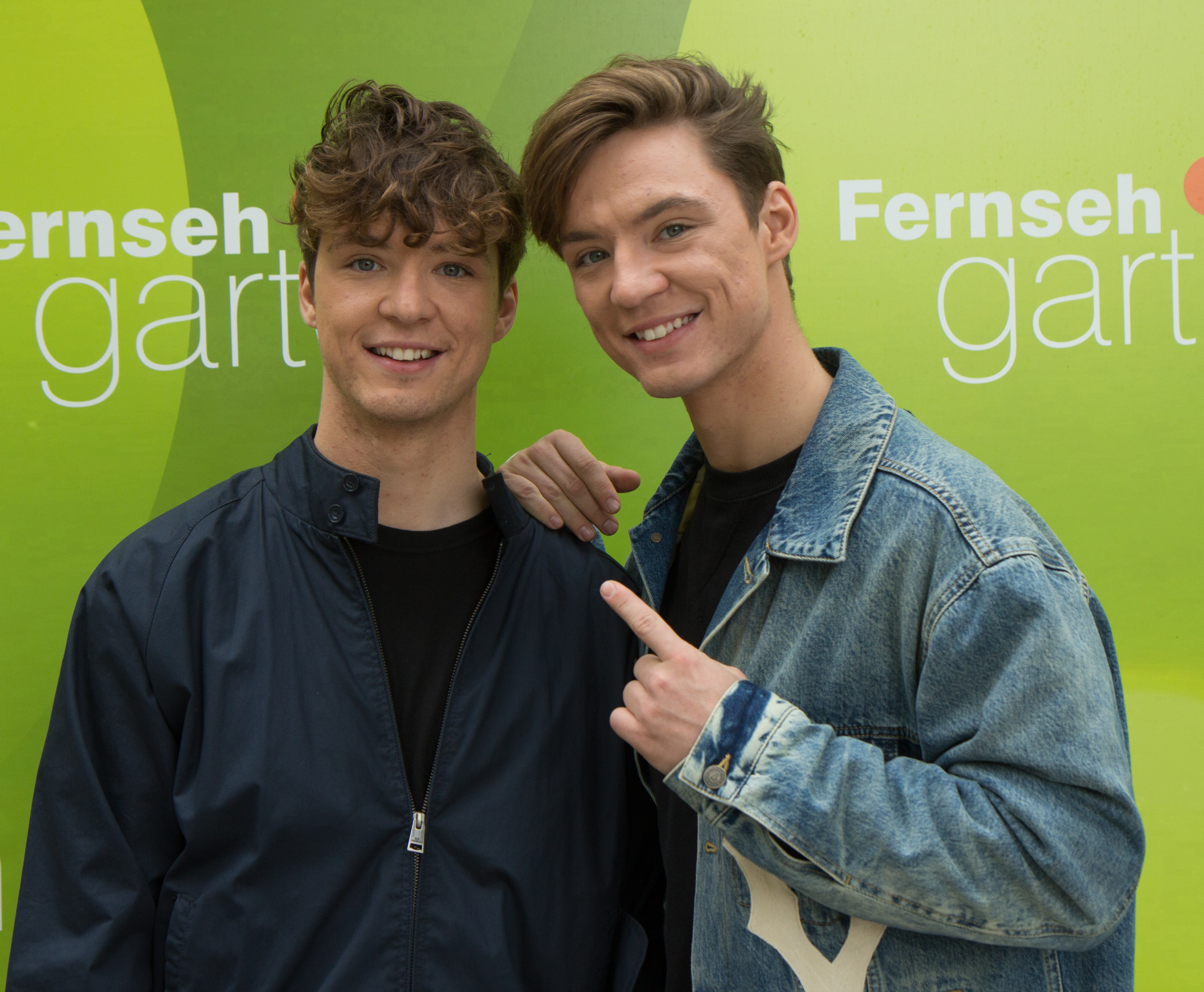
Heiko & Roman Lochmann

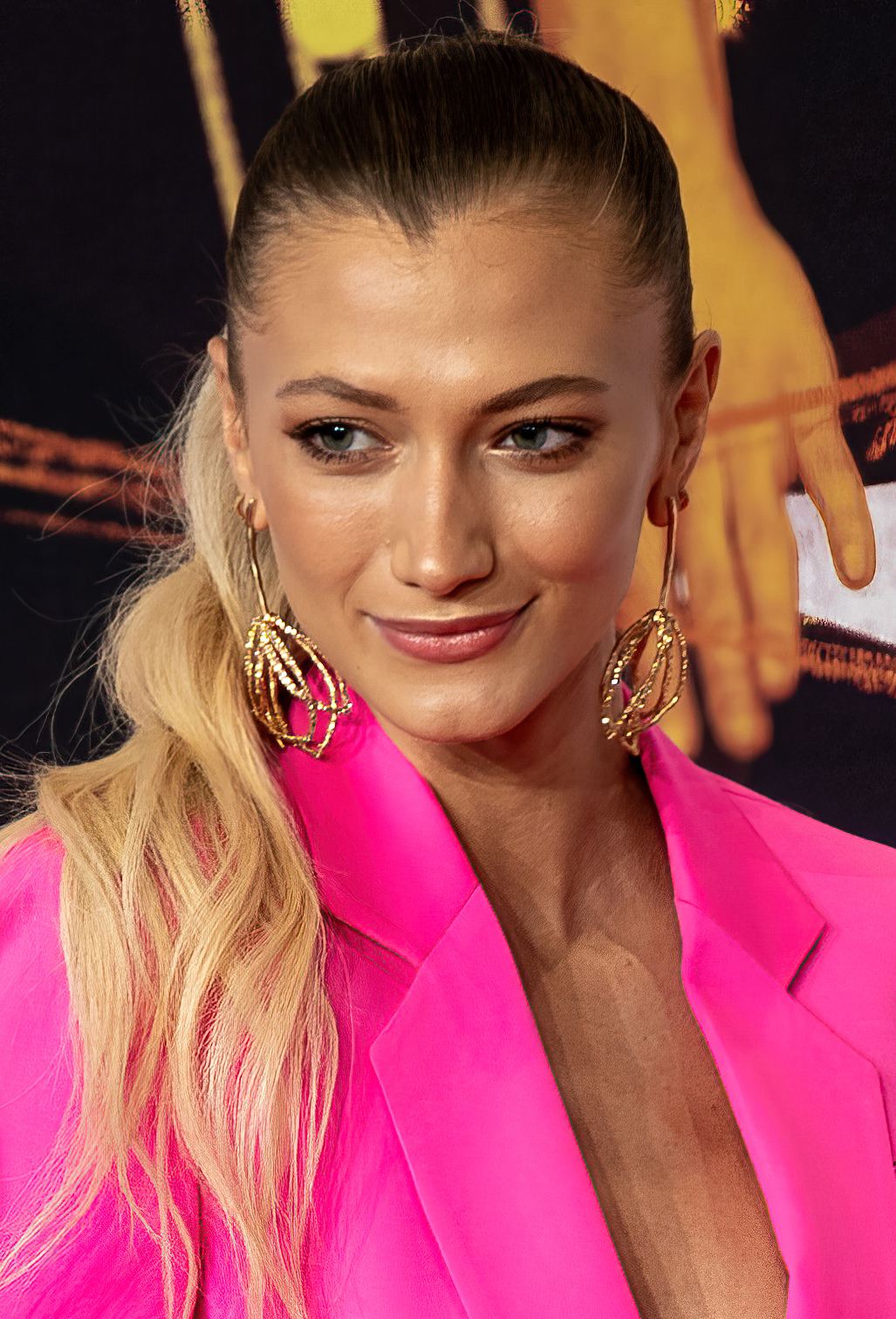
Leony

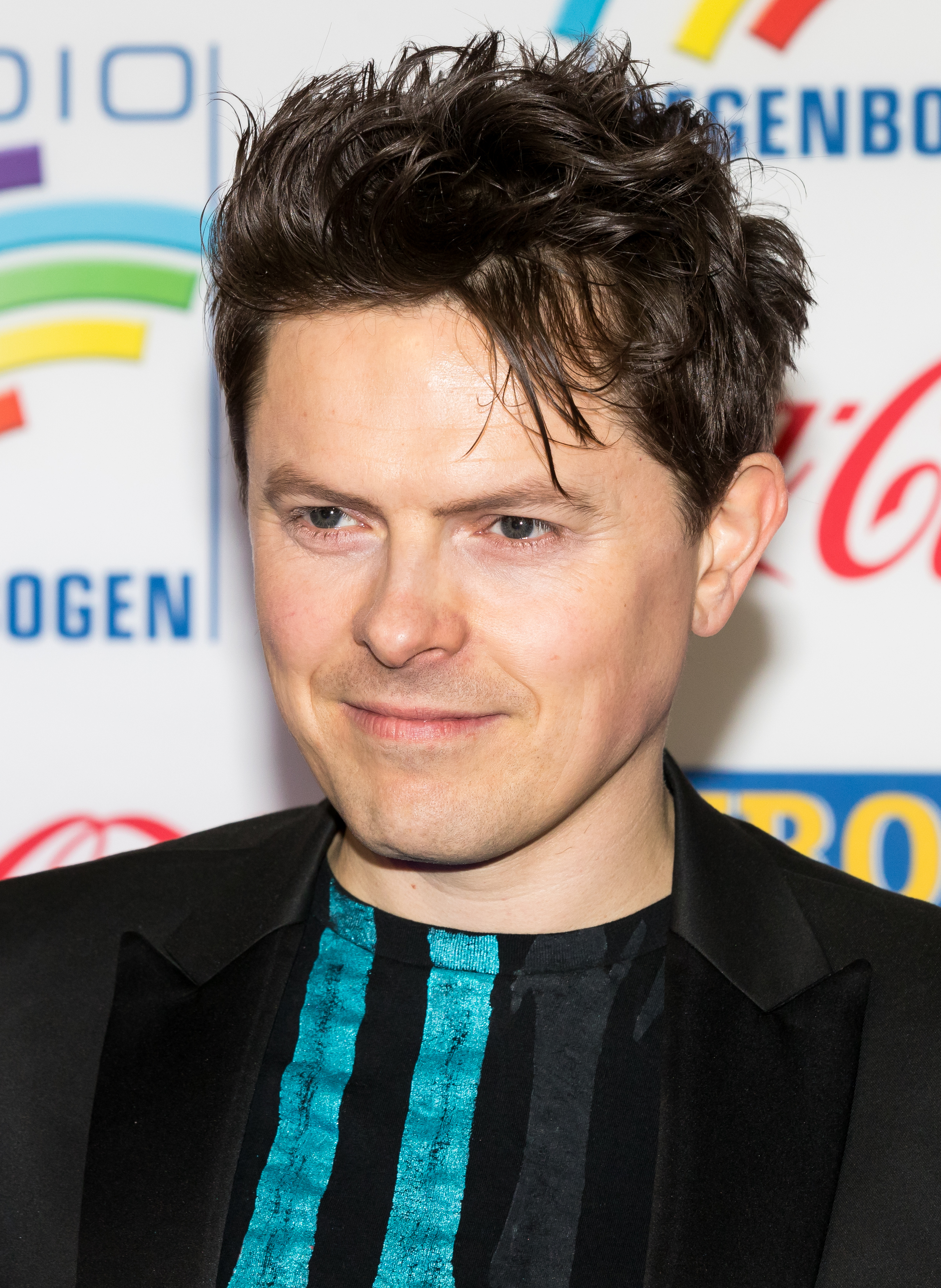
Michael Patrick Kelly

On 6 November 2025, Wincent Weiss announced that he would be departing from the show. On 13 November, it was announced that the other three coaches, Ayliva, Clueso and Stefanie Kloß would be departing from the panel and Álvaro Soler would return as a coach after a one-season hiatus. At the same time, it was announced that former coach of The Voice of Germany season 8 and The Voice Senior season 2, Michael Patrick Kelly, would be joining the panel, while Leony and Heiko & Roman Lochmann would debut as coaches. This marks the second complete panel change from the previous season, following season 9.

=== Hosts ===
On 5 November, it was announced that Thore Schölermann would not be returning as the presenter of the show after thirteen seasons. Melissa Khalaj returned for her eighth season.

== Teams ==
Teams color key
Winner
Finalist
Eliminated in the Battles rounds

Coaches	Top 48 Kids			
Álvaro Soler				
Álvaro Soler	Danaya	Fabio	Susey	Ariana
Álvaro Soler	Cataleya	Valentin	Nina & Roman	Ruben
Álvaro Soler	Sofia	Ella	Jamie	Sarah
Heiko & Roman Lochmann				
Heiko & Roman Lochmann	Illia	Levy	Lionella	Lani
Heiko & Roman Lochmann	Maja	Sophia & Valentina	Iman	Laurin
Heiko & Roman Lochmann	Lionel	Elena	Liam	Nisa
Leony				
Leony	Angelina	Max	Marie	Helena
Leony	Linsay	Nele	Giulia	Elias
Leony	Noah	Alina	Katharina	Lena
Michael Patrick Kelly				
Michael Patrick Kelly	Katelyn	Hedi	Renat	Davide
Michael Patrick Kelly	Johannes	Rowan	Gina	Lilith
Michael Patrick Kelly	Marlene	Fiona	Nivedh	Pablo

== Blind Auditions ==
The Blind Auditions began broadcasting 14 February 2026, being broadcast every Saturday on Sat.1 and available for streaming on JOYN. The mute button, introduced in the last season, did not return, however, the joker, introduced in the fifteenth season of the main series, was added to the show.

Blind auditions color key
✔	Coach hit his/her "I WANT YOU" button
	Artist defaulted to this coach's team
	Artist elected to join this coach's team
	Artist was eliminated with no coach pressing their button
	Artist received an 'All Turn'.
	Coach used Joker on this artist

Blind auditions results
Episode	Order	Artist	Age	Song	Coach's and artist's choices			
Episode	Order	Artist	Age	Song	Álvaro	HE/RO	Leony	Michael Patrick
Episode 1 (February 14)	1	Renat	12	"The Show Must Go On"	✔	✔	✔	✔
Episode 1 (February 14)	2	Julian	11	"Sowieso"	–	–	–	–
Episode 1 (February 14)	3	Hedi	9	"Für dich"	✔	✔	✔	✔
Episode 1 (February 14)	4	Cataleya	11	"Rise Up"	✔	✔	–	–
Episode 1 (February 14)	5	Laurin	12	"AF1"	–	✔	✔	–
Episode 1 (February 14)	6	Giulia	11	"Sarà perché ti amo"	✔	✔	✔	–
Episode 1 (February 14)	7	Maja^{1}	15	"Jetzt Weinst Du"	✔	✔	✔	✔
Episode 1 (February 14)	8	Djego	15	"Einen Freund wie mich"	–	–	–	–
Episode 1 (February 14)	9	Danaya	10	"Halleujah"	✔	✔	✔	✔
Episode 2 (February 21)	1	Fiona	9	"Starke Mädchen"	–	✔	–	✔
Episode 2 (February 21)	2	Fabio^{2}	14	"Mercy"	✔	✔	✔	✔
Episode 2 (February 21)	3	Elena	14	"Girls Just Wanna Have Fun"	–	✔	–	–
Episode 2 (February 21)	4	Angelina	10	"Let It Go"	✔	✔	✔	✔
Episode 2 (February 21)	5	Janis	12	"194 Länder"	–	–	–	–
Episode 2 (February 21)	6	Valentin	11	"In The Stars"	✔	✔	✔	✔
Episode 2 (February 21)	7	Gina	15	"Golden"	–	✔	✔	✔
Episode 2 (February 21)	8	Illia	13	"Virtual Insanity"	–	✔	–	✔
Episode 2 (February 21)	9	Semira	15	"Hey"	–	–	–	–
Episode 2 (February 21)	10	Marie	14	"Et Bam"	✔	✔	✔	✔
Episode 3 (February 28)	1	Alina	13	"Skyfall"	–	✔	✔	✔
Episode 3 (February 28)	2	Nivedh	10	"Hakuna Matata"	✔	–	–	✔
Episode 3 (February 28)	3	Max	14	"That's The Way It Is"	✔	✔	✔	✔
Episode 3 (February 28)	4	Lani	12	"Wir beide"	–	✔	–	–
Episode 3 (February 28)	5	Jamie	14	"Photograph"	✔	✔	✔	✔
Episode 3 (February 28)	6	Maria	14	"Pink Pony Club"	–	–	–	–
Episode 3 (February 28)	7	Johannes	13	"Plush"	–	✔	–	✔
Episode 3 (February 28)	8	Levy	13	"Auch im Regen"	–	✔	✔	–
Episode 3 (February 28)	9	Bulut	12	"Şımarık"	–	–	–	–
Episode 3 (February 28)	10	Susey	14	"What a Diff'rence a Day Makes"	✔	✔	✔	✔
Episode 4 (March 7)	1	Katharina	15	"You're Nobody 'til Somebody Loves You"	✔	✔	✔	✔
Episode 4 (March 7)	2	Lian	10	"I Always Wanted a Brother"	–	–	–	–
Episode 4 (March 7)	3	Sofia	14	"Easy on Me"	✔	✔	✔	✔
Episode 4 (March 7)	4	Ruben	13	"Stäffisburg"	✔	–	–	✔
Episode 4 (March 7)	5	Sophia & Valentina	13	"Schwesterherz"	✔	✔	✔	✔
Episode 4 (March 7)	6	Tristan	14	"Heart of Gold"	–	–	–	–
Episode 4 (March 7)	7	Katelyn	12	"Never Enough"	✔	✔	✔	✔
Episode 4 (March 7)	8	Nele	12	"Mamma Mia!"	–	✔	✔	✔
Episode 4 (March 7)	9	Iman	14	"Airwaves"	✔	✔	✔	✔
Episode 5 (March 13)	1	Ella	14	"Speechless"	✔	✔	✔	✔
Episode 5 (March 13)	2	Nisa	14	"Irgendwie, irgendwo, irgendwann"	–	✔	–	–
Episode 5 (March 13)	3	Rowan	12	"Junge"	✔	✔	–	✔
Episode 5 (March 13)	4	Flavia	14	"Glacier Rivers"	–	–	–	–
Episode 5 (March 13)	5	Helena	15	"Walzer"	–	–	✔	–
Episode 5 (March 13)	6	Elias	12	"Expresso & Tschianti"	–	✔	✔	✔
Episode 5 (March 13)	7	Sarah	15	"Der Holle Rache Kocht "	✔	–	–	–
Episode 5 (March 13)	8	Davide	14	"Everything I Wanted"	–	✔	–	✔
Episode 5 (March 13)	9	Isabella	10	"Gut Gemacht"	–	–	–	–
Episode 5 (March 13)	10	Lionella	14	"Easy"	✔	✔	✔	✔
Episode 6 (March 14)	1	Lena	14	"Lightning"	–	✔	✔	–
Episode 6 (March 14)	2	Lionel	15	"What Was I Made For?"	–	✔	–	–
Episode 6 (March 14)	3	Nina & Rowan	14 & 10	"Cheek to Cheek"	✔	✔	✔	✔
Episode 6 (March 14)	4	Marlene	14	"That's So True"	–	–	–	✔
Episode 6 (March 14)	5	Emma	13	"Better When I'm Dancin'"	–	–	–	–
Episode 6 (March 14)	6	Pablo	12	"Aline"	–	✔	–	✔
Episode 6 (March 14)	7	Liam	13	"Runaway Baby"	–	✔	✔	–
Episode 6 (March 14)	8	Linsay	15	"Girls Just Want to Have Fun"	–	–	✔	✔
Episode 6 (March 14)	9	Elliot	10	"Auf den Grund"	–	–	–	–
Episode 6 (March 14)	10	Noah	13	"Talking to the Moon"	–	✔	✔	–
Episode 6 (March 14)	11	Lilith	14	"Jesus, Take the Wheel"	–	–	–	✔
Episode 6 (March 14)	12	Ariana	8	"Elefant"	✔	✔	✔	✔

- ^1 Maja auditioned in the last season of the show, but did not receive a chair turn.
- ^2 Fabio auditioned in the last season of the show, but did not receive a chair turn.

== Battles ==
This season reintroduces the Battle rounds, which were last present in season 12. The battles are new this year, being titled as "Battles in Concert", as the battles become full-fledged concerts with an audience surrounding the stage.

The artists perform in groups of four as a band. They get to choose their own band name. After each performance, the coach selects one artist to advance, creating a total of 12 artists, 3 in each team, advancing directly to the final.

Battles color key
Artist was chosen by their coach to advance to the Finals
Artist was eliminated

Battles Results
Episode	Coach	Order	Band Name	Winner	Song	Losers
Episode 7 (March 20)
Episode 7 (March 20)	HE/RO	1	Four-Teen	Illia	"Can't Stop the Feeling!"	Elena
Episode 7 (March 20)	HE/RO	1	Four-Teen	Illia	"Can't Stop the Feeling!"	Liam
Episode 7 (March 20)	HE/RO	1	Four-Teen	Illia	"Can't Stop the Feeling!"	Nisa
Episode 7 (March 20)	Michael Patrick	2	Voice Kids Friends	Hedi	"Nessaja"	Fiona
Episode 7 (March 20)	Michael Patrick	2	Voice Kids Friends	Hedi	"Nessaja"	Nivedh
Episode 7 (March 20)	Michael Patrick	2	Voice Kids Friends	Hedi	"Nessaja"	Pablo
Episode 7 (March 20)	Leony	3	Mic Attack	Max	"Wrecking Ball"	Alina
Episode 7 (March 20)	Leony	3	Mic Attack	Max	"Wrecking Ball"	Katharina
Episode 7 (March 20)	Leony	3	Mic Attack	Max	"Wrecking Ball"	Lena
Episode 7 (March 20)	Álvaro	4	Echo of Fire	Fabio	"I See Fire"	Ella
Episode 7 (March 20)	Álvaro	4	Echo of Fire	Fabio	"I See Fire"	Jamie
Episode 7 (March 20)	Álvaro	4	Echo of Fire	Fabio	"I See Fire"	Sarah
Episode 7 (March 20)	HE/RO	5	Astr0 G's	Lionella	"Astronaut"	Lionel
Episode 7 (March 20)	HE/RO	5	Astr0 G's	Lionella	"Astronaut"	Iman
Episode 7 (March 20)	HE/RO	5	Astr0 G's	Lionella	"Astronaut"	Laurin
Episode 7 (March 20)	Michael Patrick	6	4Ever Tonight	Katelyn	"Total Eclipse of the Heart"	Gina
Episode 7 (March 20)	Michael Patrick	6	4Ever Tonight	Katelyn	"Total Eclipse of the Heart"	Lilith
Episode 7 (March 20)	Michael Patrick	6	4Ever Tonight	Katelyn	"Total Eclipse of the Heart"	Marlene
Episode 8 (March 21)
Episode 8 (March 21)	Leony	1	Young Voices	Angelina	"Wir Sind Groß"	Elias
Episode 8 (March 21)	Leony	1	Young Voices	Angelina	"Wir Sind Groß"	Giulia
Episode 8 (March 21)	Leony	1	Young Voices	Angelina	"Wir Sind Groß"	Noah
Episode 8 (March 21)	Michael Patrick	2	Rock Boys	Renat	"Bring Me to Life"	Davide
Episode 8 (March 21)	Michael Patrick	2	Rock Boys	Renat	"Bring Me to Life"	Johannes
Episode 8 (March 21)	Michael Patrick	2	Rock Boys	Renat	"Bring Me to Life"	Rowan
Episode 8 (March 21)	Álvaro	3	All About That 5	Susey	"All About That Bass"	Nina & Roman
Episode 8 (March 21)	Álvaro	3	All About That 5	Susey	"All About That Bass"	Ruben
Episode 8 (March 21)	Álvaro	3	All About That 5	Susey	"All About That Bass"	Sofia
Episode 8 (March 21)	HE/RO	4	Rückenwind	Levy	"Irgendwas bleibt"	Lani
Episode 8 (March 21)	HE/RO	4	Rückenwind	Levy	"Irgendwas bleibt"	Maja
Episode 8 (March 21)	HE/RO	4	Rückenwind	Levy	"Irgendwas bleibt"	Sophia & Valentina
Episode 8 (March 21)	Álvaro	5	Honey Energetics	Danaya	"Beautiful Things"	Ariana
Episode 8 (March 21)	Álvaro	5	Honey Energetics	Danaya	"Beautiful Things"	Cataleya
Episode 8 (March 21)	Álvaro	5	Honey Energetics	Danaya	"Beautiful Things"	Valentin
Episode 8 (March 21)	Leony	6	Blackouts	Marie	"Can't Help Falling in Love"	Nele
Episode 8 (March 21)	Leony	6	Blackouts	Marie	"Can't Help Falling in Love"	Linsay
Episode 8 (March 21)	Leony	6	Blackouts	Marie	"Can't Help Falling in Love"	Helena

== Final ==
The final took place on 3 April. The 12 finalists sang live in the studio and the coaches performed with their 3 finalists, viewers decided who is crowned the winner of the season through a voting process.

Former coach Wincent Weiss co-hosted this episode alongside Melissa Khalaj.

Finale color key
Winner
Runners-Up

Finale results
Order	Coach	Artist	Solo song	Song with Coach	Result
1	Michael Patrick Kelly	Katelyn	"You Raise Me Up"	“You're the Voice”	Winner
2	Michael Patrick Kelly	Renat	"The Final Countdown"	“You're the Voice”	Runners-up
3	Michael Patrick Kelly	Hedi	"Wie schön du bist"	“You're the Voice”	Runners-up
4	Leony	Marie	"Voilà"	“Unwritten”	Runners-up
5	Leony	Angelina	"Girl on Fire"	“Unwritten”	Runners-up
6	Leony	Max	"Run to You"	“Unwritten”	Runners-up
7	Heiko & Roman Lochmann	Levy	"Geboren um zu leben"	“Nur ein Wort”	Runners-up
8	Heiko & Roman Lochmann	Lionella	"Wildberry Lillet"	“Nur ein Wort”	Runners-up
9	Heiko & Roman Lochmann	Illia	"I Just Might"	“Nur ein Wort”	Runners-up
10	Álvaro Soler	Danaya	"My Heart Will Go On"	“We Are the World”^{1}	Runners-up
11	Álvaro Soler	Fabio	"There's Nothing Holdin' Me Back"	“We Are the World”^{1}	Runners-up
12	Álvaro Soler	Susey	“At Last”	“We Are the World”^{1}	Runners-up

^1 Featured former members of Álvaro Soler's team: Ariana, Valentin, Sophia, Cataleya, Nina & Roman, Sarah and Ella.
