= The Voice Kids (German TV series) season 13 =

Season of television series

The Voice Kids
- Season 13
- Hosted by: Thore Schölermann; Melissa Khalaj
- Coaches: Wincent Weiss; Ayliva; Clueso; Stefanie Kloß
- Winner: Neo Klingl
- Winning coach: Wincent Weiss

Release
- Original network: JOYN; Sat.1
- Original release: 21 February – 18 April 2025

Season chronology
- Next → Season 14

The thirteenth season of the talent show The Voice Kids premiered on 21 February 2025. The show was broadcast by two local TV stations, JOYN and Sat.1.

Of the coaches from the previous season, only Wincent Weiss returned, marking his fifth season. Former coach Stefanie Kloß returned for her third season after a three-season hiatus. Ayliva and Clueso joined the show as new coaches this season. Thore Schölermann returned for his thirteenth season as host, with Melissa Khalaj returning for her seventh season as host.

Neo Klingl from Team Wincent won the competition on 18 April 2025. His victory marked Wincent Weiss' second win as a coach. With Weiss' win, he became the third coach after Henning Wehland and Michi & Smudo to win two consective seasons.

== Panelists ==
=== Coaches ===
The Voice Kids Germany season 13 main coaches

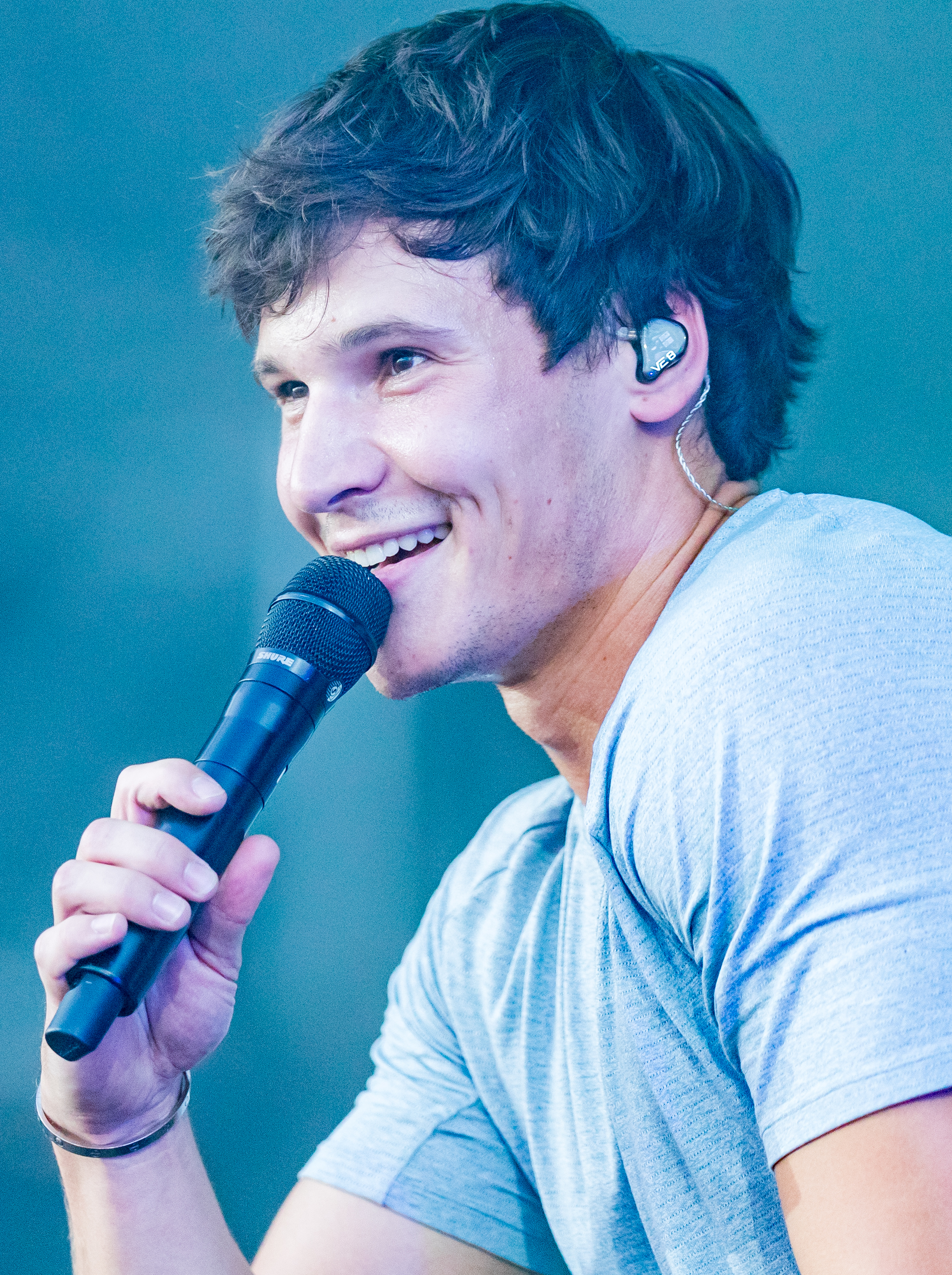
Wincent Weiss

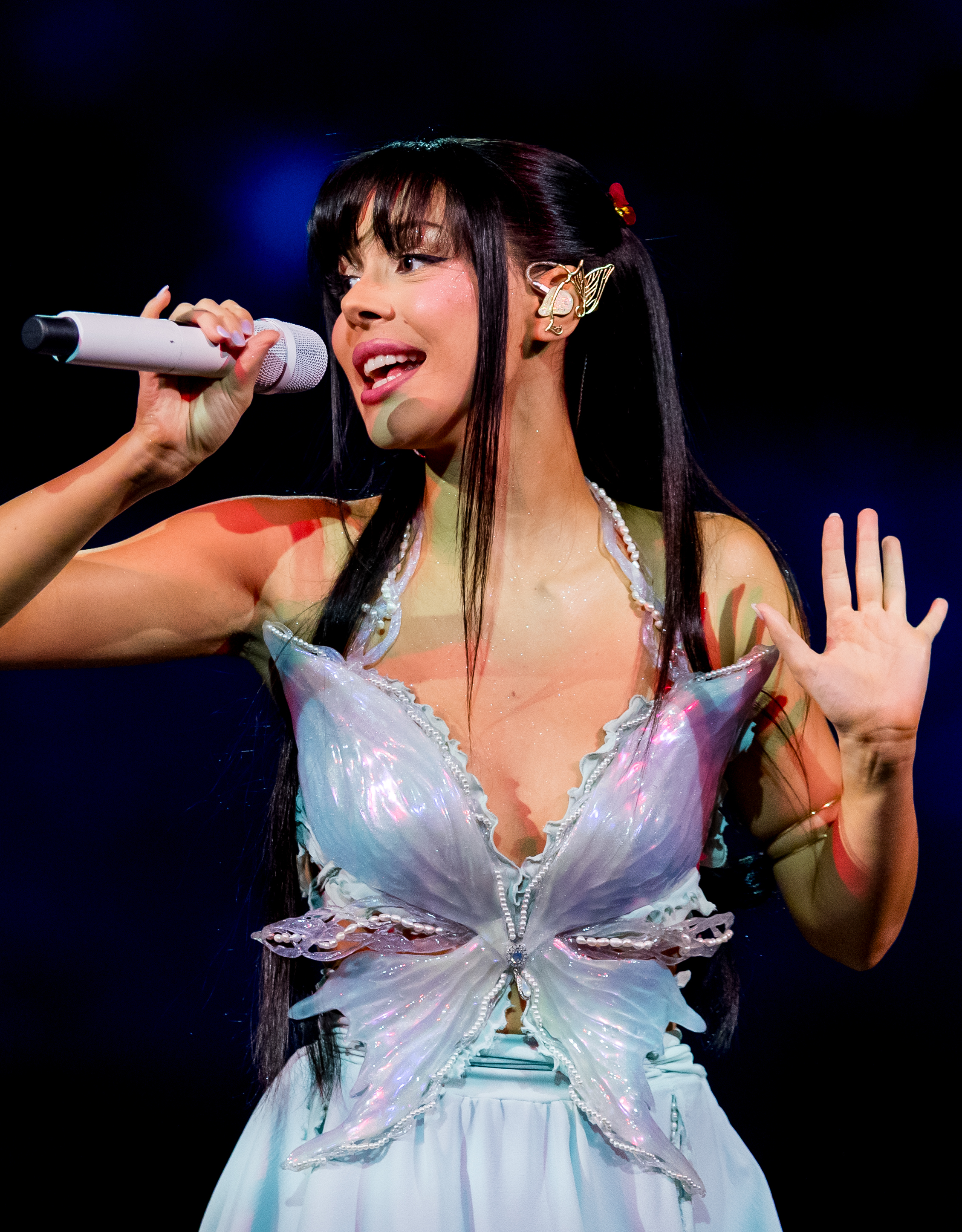
Ayliva

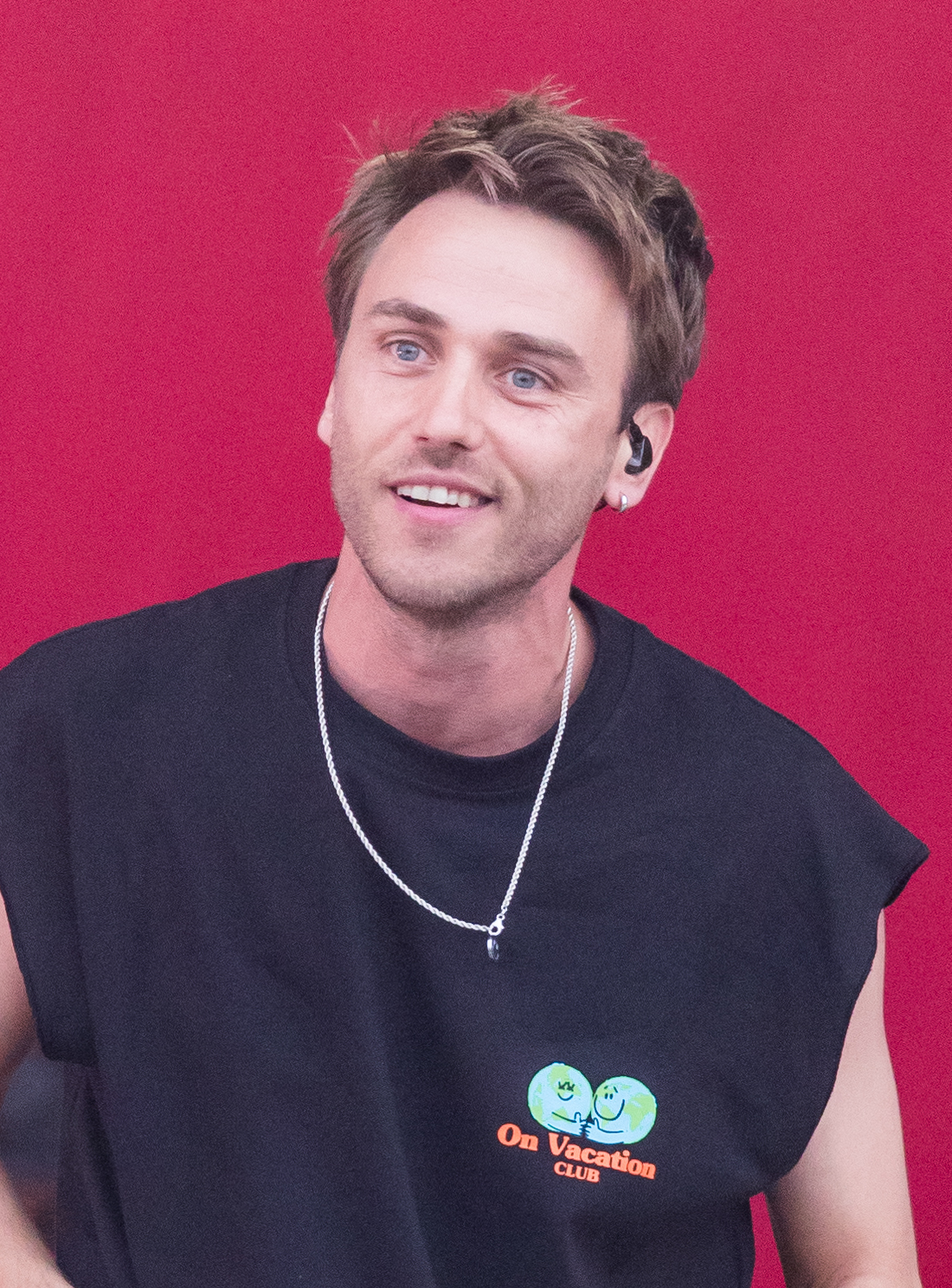
Clueso

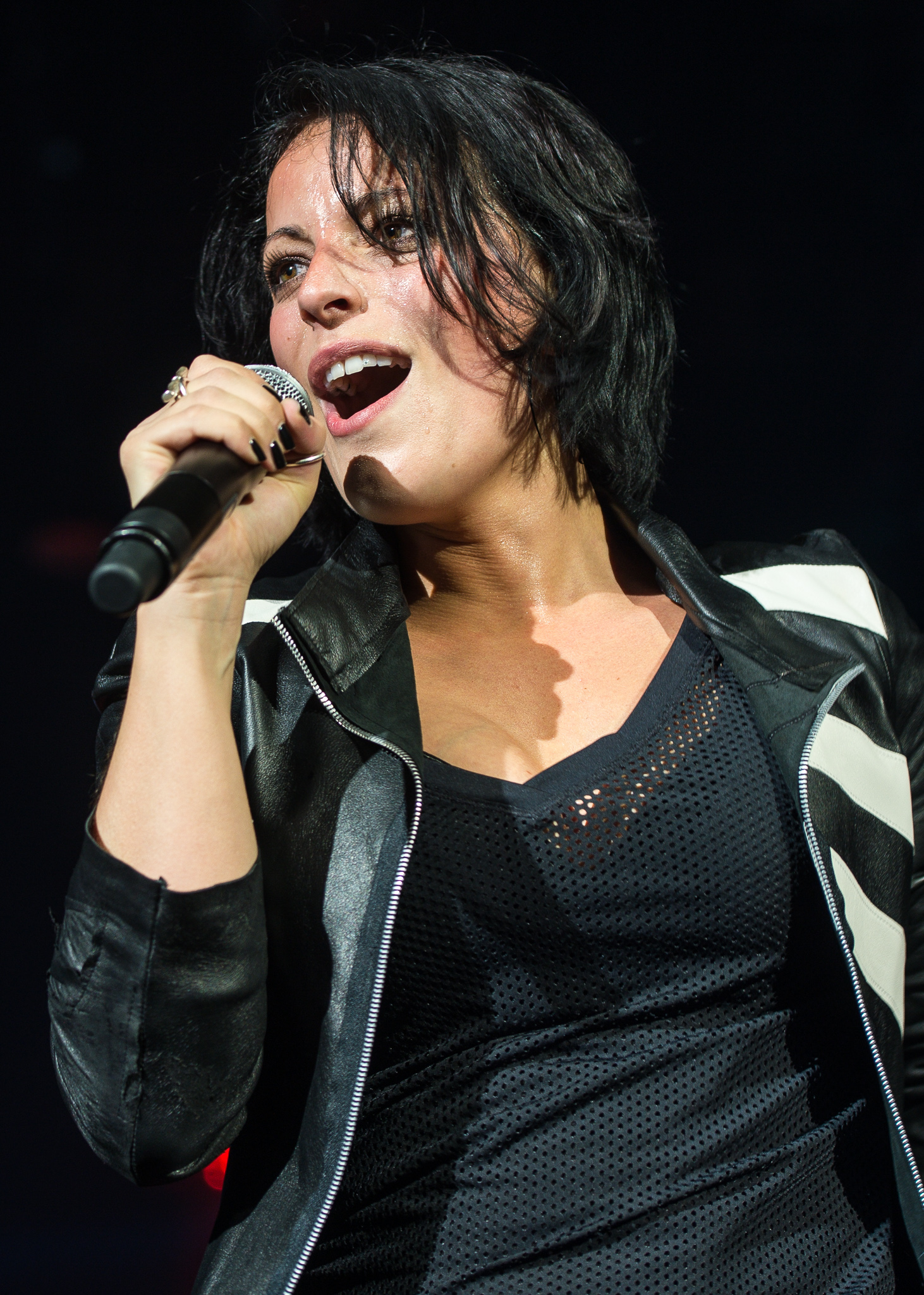
Stefanie Kloß

On 24 October 2024, it was announced that only Wincent Weiss would be returning to the panel as the other four coaches; Lena Meyer-Landrut, Álvaro Soler and Michi & Smudo would depart the panel. On 6 November 2024, it was announced that Stefanie Kloß would return after a three-season hiatus, and Ayliva and Clueso would debut as coaches. This was the first season since season 4 to not feature a duo coaching team, as well as the second season since season 7 to feature two female coaches.

=== Hosts ===
Both Thore Schölermann and Melissa Khalaj returned as hosts from last season for their thirteenth and sixth season as presenters, respectively.

== Teams ==
Teams color key
Winner
Finalist
Eliminated in the Knockouts rounds

Coaches	Top 51 Kids				
Wincent Weiss	Neo	Tuana	Josh	Alwin	Ananthu
Wincent Weiss	Anna	Fabian	Nele	Nikolas	Salvatore
Wincent Weiss	Sofia	Sophie	Viktoria		
Ayliva	Ian	Malou	Eva	Alissia	Angelina
Ayliva	Athanasios	Cataleya	Ella	Emily	Leonie
Ayliva	Luca	Maximilian	Sanvi		
Clueso	Piet	Sohum	Daryan	Anna	Christian
Clueso	Elias	Jamil	Lena	Liva	Madelene
Clueso	Marlene	Vincent	Volodymyr		
Stefanie Kloß	Luna	Helena	Arhanna	Ava	Claudius
Stefanie Kloß	Dana & Fabrice	Jonas	Lilo	Mariana	Max
Stefanie Kloß	Neila	Tabea			

== Blind Auditions ==
The Blind Auditions began broadcasting 21 February 2025, being broadcast every Friday on JOYN. New this season is the mute buzzer which allows a coach to easily mute his/her competition and be the only one to speak to the artist. This can happen at any time, during or after the performance and each coach has only one to use during the whole of The Blind Auditions.

Blind auditions color key
✔	Coach hit his/her "I WANT YOU" button
✔	Coach hit his/her "I WANT YOU" button but was muted from speaking to the artist
	Artist defaulted to this coach's team
	Artist elected to join this coach's team
	Artist was eliminated with no coach pressing their button
	Artist received an 'All Turn'.

Blind auditions results
Episode	Order	Artist	Age	Song	Coach's and artist's choices			
Episode	Order	Artist	Age	Song	Wincent	Ayliva	Clueso	Stefanie
Episode 1 (February 21)	1	Emily	15	"Hurt"	✔	✔	✔	✔
Episode 1 (February 21)	2	Piet	14	"Diene Mutter"	–	✔	✔	✔
Episode 1 (February 21)	3	Lennon	10	"Für Die Liebe"	–	–	–	–
Episode 1 (February 21)	4	Luna	15	"Put Your Records On"	–	–	✔	✔
Episode 1 (February 21)	5	Alissia	10	"Am I Enough?"	–	✔	–	–
Episode 1 (February 21)	6	Neo	14	"Reflection"	✔	✔	✔	✔
Episode 1 (February 21)	7	Mikayel	12	"Hit The Road Jack"	–	–	–	–
Episode 1 (February 21)	8	Lilo	11	"A Million Dreams"	✔	✔	✔	✔
Episode 1 (February 21)	9	Liva	11	"I Feel Good"	✔	–	✔	–
Episode 1 (February 21)	10	Tuana	14	"Lose Control"	✔	✔	✔	✔
Episode 2 (February 28)	1	Fabian	15	"Voll Gerne"	✔	✔	✔	✔
Episode 2 (February 28)	2	Niko	15	"Song 2"	–	–	–	–
Episode 2 (February 28)	3	Nele	9	"Wie Ein Mädchen"	✔	✔	✔	✔
Episode 2 (February 28)	4	Jamil	11	"Universelle"	–	–	✔	–
Episode 2 (February 28)	5	Claudius	14	"Iris"	✔	–	✔	✔
Episode 2 (February 28)	6	Eva	13	"Leave (Get Out)"	–	✔	✔	–
Episode 2 (February 28)	7	Greta	12	"Sk8er Boi"	–	–	–	–
Episode 2 (February 28)	8	Athanasios	10	"Lieb mich"	✔	✔	✔	✔
Episode 2 (February 28)	9	Ananthu	14	"Beggin'"	✔	✔	–	✔
Episode 2 (February 28)	10	Arhanna	12	"Skyscraper"	–	–	✔	✔
Episode 2 (February 28)	11	Daryan	13	"Proud Mary"	–	–	✔	✔
Episode 3 (March 7)	1	Dana & Fabrice	12 & 10	"Breaking Free"	✔	✔	✔	✔
Episode 3 (March 7)	2	Josh	15	"Love In The Dark"	✔	✔	✔	✔
Episode 3 (March 7)	3	Lucy	12	"Zu Jung (Tick Tack)"	–	–	–	–
Episode 3 (March 7)	4	Ella	11	"Dear Mr. President"	–	✔	✔	✔
Episode 3 (March 7)	5	Mariana	13	"La Llorona"	–	–	✔	✔
Episode 3 (March 7)	6	Christian	15	"The Search"	✔	–	✔	–
Episode 3 (March 7)	7	Sanvi	14	"In The Stars"	✔	✔	✔	✔
Episode 3 (March 7)	8	Neila	13	"Austin (Boots Stop Workin')"	–	–	✔	✔
Episode 3 (March 7)	9	Volodymyr	13	"Fairytale"	–	–	✔	–
Episode 3 (March 7)	10	Maja	14	"Julia"	–	–	–	–
Episode 3 (March 7)	11	Viktoria	9	"I See The Light"	✔	–	–	–
Episode 3 (March 7)	12	Salvatore	15	"Quite Miss Home"	✔	✔	✔	✔
Episode 4 (March 14)	1	Sofia	9	"Hero"	✔	✔	✔	✔
Episode 4 (March 14)	2	Jonas	13	"Writing's on the Wall"	–	✔	✔	✔
Episode 4 (March 14)	3	Lena	12	"Mangos Mit Chili"	–	–	✔	–
Episode 4 (March 14)	4	Nikolas	13	"Never Too Much"	✔	–	–	✔
Episode 4 (March 14)	5	Cataleya	11	"Schrei Nach Liebe"	✔	✔	✔	✔
Episode 4 (March 14)	6	Lynn	14	"Our Song"	–	–	–	–
Episode 4 (March 14)	7	Elias	15	"Something"	–	–	✔	✔
Episode 4 (March 14)	8	Anna	12	"The Code"	✔	–	✔	✔
Episode 4 (March 14)	9	Luca	12	"Grenade"	–	✔	–	–
Episode 4 (March 14)	10	Cassandra	12	"Wie Schön Du Bist"	–	–	–	–
Episode 4 (March 14)	11	Marlene	13	"Der Letzte Song (Alles Wird Gut)"	–	–	✔	✔
Episode 4 (March 14)	12	Max	14	"Bed of Roses"	✔	✔	✔	✔
Episode 5 (March 21)	1	Madelene	14	"Always Remember Us This Way"	–	–	✔	–
Episode 5 (March 21)	2	Maximilian	12	"Once Upon A December"	–	✔	–	✔
Episode 5 (March 21)	3	Marie	10	"Ausmacht"	–	–	–	–
Episode 5 (March 21)	4	Angelina	15	"Yesterday"	✔	✔	–	–
Episode 5 (March 21)	5	Helena	11	"Avant Toi"	–	✔	✔	✔
Episode 5 (March 21)	6	Vincent	12	"Arcade"	–	–	✔	✔
Episode 5 (March 21)	7	Leonie	13	"Fingers Crossed"	✔	✔	✔	✔
Episode 5 (March 21)	8	Fabio	13	"Ribbon In The Sky"	–	–	–	–
Episode 5 (March 21)	9	Sohum	12	"Kaisi Paheli Zindagani"	–	–	✔	–
Episode 5 (March 21)	10	Ava	14	"Crazy"	–	–	✔	✔
Episode 5 (March 21)	11	Alwin	13	"Lascia Ch'io Pianga"	✔	✔	✔	✔
Episode 5 (March 21)	12	Anna	15	"Don't Forget To Remember Me"	–	–	✔	–
Episode 5 (March 21)	13	Elias	15	"Nur In Meinem Kopf"	–	–	–	–
Episode 5 (March 21)	14	Malou	12	"Traitor"	✔	✔	✔	✔
Episode 6 (March 28)	1	Sophie	15	"Strong"	✔	✔	✔	–
Episode 6 (March 28)	2	Tabea	13	"What Was I Made For?"	–	–	✔	✔
Episode 6 (March 28)	3	Ian	15	"What A Wonderful World"	–	✔	–	✔

== Knockouts ==
The Knockouts began broadcasting 28 March 2025, being broadcast every Friday on JOYN. Each coach groups four or five of their artists to sing individually. Following the performances, their coach selects one artist to move on, while the others are eliminated.

Knockouts color key
Artist won the knockout and advanced to the Finals
Artist lost the knockout and was eliminated

Episode	Coach	Winner	Song	Losers	Song
Episode 6 (March 28)	Wincent Weiss	Neo	"I Have Nothing"	Sofia	"Wannabe"
Episode 6 (March 28)	Wincent Weiss	Neo	"I Have Nothing"	Anna	"Tattoo"
Episode 6 (March 28)	Wincent Weiss	Neo	"I Have Nothing"	Fabian	"Stitches"
Episode 6 (March 28)	Wincent Weiss	Neo	"I Have Nothing"	Viktoria	"Do You Want To Build A Snowman?"
Episode 6 (March 28)	Stefanie Kloß	Luna	"Clown"	Claudius	"Rest Der Welt"
Episode 6 (March 28)	Stefanie Kloß	Luna	"Clown"	Mariana	"Nuestra Canción"
Episode 6 (March 28)	Stefanie Kloß	Luna	"Clown"	Max	"Rock & Roll Queen"
Episode 6 (March 28)	Ayliva	Eva	"Bust Your Windows"	Sanvi	"Control"
Episode 6 (March 28)	Ayliva	Eva	"Bust Your Windows"	Angelina	"Human"
Episode 6 (March 28)	Ayliva	Eva	"Bust Your Windows"	Luca	"Perfect"
Episode 7 (April 4)	Stefanie Kloß	Helena	"Creep"	Lilo	"Cover Me in Sunshine"
Episode 7 (April 4)	Stefanie Kloß	Helena	"Creep"	Jonas	"Dancing on My Own"
Episode 7 (April 4)	Stefanie Kloß	Helena	"Creep"	Dana & Fabrice	"When You're Gone"
Episode 7 (April 4)	Wincent Weiss	Tuana	"Sen İstanbul' sun"	Ananthu	"Are You Gonna Be My Girl"
Episode 7 (April 4)	Wincent Weiss	Tuana	"Sen İstanbul' sun"	Nele	"Symphonie"
Episode 7 (April 4)	Wincent Weiss	Tuana	"Sen İstanbul' sun"	Alwin	"Vois sur ton chemin"
Episode 7 (April 4)	Clueso	Sohum	"Ocean Eyes"	Liva	"Uptown Funk"
Episode 7 (April 4)	Clueso	Sohum	"Ocean Eyes"	Marlene	"Ich wünschte, du wärst verloren"
Episode 7 (April 4)	Clueso	Sohum	"Ocean Eyes"	Jamil	"Ohne Dich"
Episode 7 (April 4)	Clueso	Sohum	"Ocean Eyes"	Volodymyr	"Feeling Good"
Episode 7 (April 4)	Ayliva	Ian	"Until I Found You"	Emily	"Because of You"
Episode 7 (April 4)	Ayliva	Ian	"Until I Found You"	Maximilian	"Can You Feel the Love Tonight"
Episode 7 (April 4)	Ayliva	Ian	"Until I Found You"	Leonie	"Unwritten"
Episode 7 (April 4)	Clueso	Piet	"Der Himmel soll warten"	Anna	"You're Still the One"
Episode 7 (April 4)	Clueso	Piet	"Der Himmel soll warten"	Vincent	"Eyes Closed"
Episode 7 (April 4)	Clueso	Piet	"Der Himmel soll warten"	Elias	"Wonderwall"
Episode 8 (April 11)	Wincent Weiss	Josh	"Rise Like a Phoenix"	Salvatore	"I'm Still Standing"
Episode 8 (April 11)	Wincent Weiss	Josh	"Rise Like a Phoenix"	Sophie	"The Show Must Go On"
Episode 8 (April 11)	Wincent Weiss	Josh	"Rise Like a Phoenix"	Nikolas	"As It Was"
Episode 8 (April 11)	Clueso	Daryan	"Die with a Smile"	Madelene	"What About Us"
Episode 8 (April 11)	Clueso	Daryan	"Die with a Smile"	Lena	"Hässlich"
Episode 8 (April 11)	Clueso	Daryan	"Die with a Smile"	Christian	"When I Grow Up"
Episode 8 (April 11)	Ayliva	Malou	"Impossible"	Cataleya	"Price Tag"
Episode 8 (April 11)	Ayliva	Malou	"Impossible"	Athanasios	"Verlierer"
Episode 8 (April 11)	Ayliva	Malou	"Impossible"	Ella	"Big Girls Don't Cry"
Episode 8 (April 11)	Ayliva	Malou	"Impossible"	Alissia	"Alles nichts ohne Dich'
Episode 8 (April 11)	Stefanie Kloß	Arhanna	"Million Reasons"	Tabea	"Vienna"
Episode 8 (April 11)	Stefanie Kloß	Arhanna	"Million Reasons"	Neila	"People Help the People"
Episode 8 (April 11)	Stefanie Kloß	Arhanna	"Million Reasons"	Ava	"Murder on the Dancefloor"

== Final ==
The final, the only live round of the season, aired on 18 April 2025. The top twelve artists all performed once solo and with the rest of their team and coach. The public then voted for the winner of the season.

During the final, former The Voice of Germany coach Sarah Connor performed her single "Spinna".

Finale color key
Artist received the most voted and was announced as the winner
Artist finished as a runner-up

Finale results
Order	Coach	Artist	Song	Result
1	Clueso	Daryan	"Purple Rain"	Runners-up
2	Wincent Weiss	Tuana	"Titanium"	Runners-up
3	Ayliva	Ian	"Unchained Melody"	Runners-up
4	Stefanie Kloß	Arhanna	"Beautiful Things"	Runners-up
5	Clueso	Sohum	"Somewhere Over the Rainbow"	Runners-up
6	Wincent Weiss	Josh	"Run"	Runners-up
7	Stefanie Kloß	Helena	"Voyage, voyage"	Runners-up
8	Wincent Weiss	Neo	"All by Myself"	Winner
9	Ayliva	Eva	"Oscar Winning Tears"	Runners-up
10	Stefanie Kloß	Luna	"If I Ain't Got You"	Runners-up
11	Ayliva	Malou	"Skinny Love"	Runners-up
12	Clueso	Piet	"Zeit, Dass Sich Was Dreht"	Runners-up
