= Alles auf Anfang 2014–04 =

Greatest hits album by Silbermond
- Released: 7 November 2014
- Genre: Pop; pop rock
- Label: Verschwende deine Zeit

Silbermond chronology
Himmel auf (2012)	Alles auf Anfang 2014–04 (2014)	Leichtes Gepäck (2015)

Alles auf Anfang 2014–04 (Starting Over 2014–04) is the first compilation album by German band Silbermond. It was released on 27 November 2015 by Verschwende deine Zeit GmbH.

== Critical reception ==
Professional ratings
Review scores
Source	Rating
laut.de	1/5 stars

laut.de editor Sven Kabelitz found that Alles auf Anfang 2014–04 "simply never seems to end. The list of tracks that did NOT make it onto this compilation is probably short. As the game progresses, I would like to follow my colleague Austel's example and hit the skip button."

== Track listing ==
Alles auf Anfang 2014–04 track listing
No.	Title	Writer(s)	Producer(s)	Length
1.	"Alles Gute"	Thomas Stolle; Johannes Stolle; Andreas Nowak; Stefanie Kloss	Ingo Politz; Bernd Wendlandt; T. Stolle	3:46
2.	"Irgendwas bleibt"	T. Stolle; J. Stolle; Nowak; Kloss	Politz; Wendlandt; T. Stolle	3:14
3.	"Meer sein"	T. Stolle; J. Stolle; Nowak; Kloss	Politz; Wendlandt	3:55
4.	"In Zeiten wie diesen"	T. Stolle; J. Stolle; Nowak; Kloss	Politz; Wendlandt	4:35
5.	"Symphonie"	T. Stolle; J. Stolle; Nowak; Kloss	Politz; Wendlandt	4:04
6.	"Krieger des Lichts"	T. Stolle; J. Stolle; Nowak; Kloss	Politz; Wendlandt; T. Stolle	3:02
7.	"Unendlich"	T. Stolle; J. Stolle; Nowak; Kloss	Politz; Wendlandt	6:13
8.	"Weiße Fahnen"	T. Stolle; J. Stolle; Nowak; Kloss	Politz; Wendlandt; T. Stolle	4:35
9.	"Himmel auf"	T. Stolle; J. Stolle; Nowak; Kloss	Politz; Wendlandt; T. Stolle	3:20
10.	"Nichts passiert"	T. Stolle; J. Stolle; Nowak; Kloss	Politz; Wendlandt	4:05
11.	"Durch die Nacht"	T. Stolle; J. Stolle; Nowak; Kloss	Politz; Wendlandt	4:12
12.	"Kartenhaus"	T. Stolle; J. Stolle; Nowak; Kloss	Politz; Wendlandt	3:14
13.	"Das Ende vom Kreis"	J. Stolle; Nowak; Kloss	Politz; Wendlandt	3:50
14.	"Keine Angst"	T. Stolle; J. Stolle; Nowak; Kloss	Politz; Wendlandt; T. Stolle	4:41
15.	"48 Stunden" (Demo 2008)	T. Stolle; J. Stolle; Nowak; Kloss	Politz; Wendlandt	4:16

== Charts ==
Weekly chart performance for Alles auf Anfang 2014–04
Chart (2014)	Peak position
Austrian Albums (Ö3 Austria)	11
German Albums (Offizielle Top 100)	4
Swiss Albums (Schweizer Hitparade)	6

== Certifications and sales ==
Certifications for Alles auf Anfang 2014–04
Region	Certification	Certified units/sales
Germany (BVMI)	Gold	100,000^{‡}
^{‡} Sales+streaming figures based on certification alone.

== Release history ==
Release history and formats for Alles auf Anfang 2014–04
Region	Date	Format	Label	Ref.
Various	7 November 2014	Digital download; CD	Verschwende deine Zeit	
