= Schritte =

Studio album by Silbermond
- Released: 15 November 2019
- Length: 34:45
- Language: German
- Label: Verschwende deine Zeit
- Producer: Thomas Stolle; Alexander Freund; Moritz Enders

Silbermond chronology
Leichtes Gepäck (2015)	Schritte (2019)	AUF AUF (2023)

Schritte (transl. Steps) is the sixth studio album by German band Silbermond. It was released on 15 November 2019 through Verschwende deine Zeit. The album reached number one in Germany, becoming the band's third album to debut atop the German Albums Chart.

== Background and composition ==
The band announced the album on 20 September 2019. The album title refers to the process of learning to walk, be it that of a small individual or of all humanity. The sound of the album was described as minimalistic and stripped-down. Lyrically, the band positions itself against xenophobia which alternates with lyrics regarding Kloß' and Stolle's parenthood as well as the loss of Kloß' father. With the album, the band intended to express their views on different issues without being condescending.

== Critical reception ==
Professional ratings
Review scores
Source	Rating
laut.de	2/5 stars
Mix1	7/8 stars
Mannheimer Morgen	4/6 stars
Plattentests	3/10

Schritte received generally positive reviews. The German magazine Stern described the songs as poignant and catchy. The website Mix1 noted that the band dips increasingly more into Folk music and will not shy away from discussing social issues. In a negative review, Kevin Holtmann of Plattentests criticized the album for being "surface level" and that the band lacks edge or courage to "break free from their musical conventions".

== Track listing ==
All song written by Thomas Stolle, Johannes Stolle, Andreas Nowak, and Stefanie Kloß.

No.	Title	Length
1.	"Schritte"	3:36
2.	"Was Freiheit ist"	2:46
3.	"Bestes Leben"	3:07
4.	"Träum ja nur (Hippies)"	3:06
5.	"In meiner Erinnerung"	3:45
6.	"Luftschloss"	3:20
7.	"Für Amy"	2:46
8.	"Hand aufs Herz"	3:48
9.	"Silbermond"	4:40
10.	"Ein schöner Schluss"	3:45
Total length:		34:45

== Charts ==
=== Weekly charts ===
Weekly chart performance for Schritte
Chart (2019)	Peak position
Austrian Albums (Ö3 Austria)	5
German Albums (Offizielle Top 100)	1
Swiss Albums (Schweizer Hitparade)	4

=== Year-end charts ===
Year-end chart performance for Schritte
Chart (2020)	Position
German Albums (Offizielle Top 100)	97

== Release history ==
Release history and formats for Schritte
Region	Date	Format	Label	Ref.
Various	15 November 2019	CD; digital download; streaming	Verschwende deine Zeit	
