= Laut Gedacht =

Laut gedacht

Studio album by Silbermond
- Released: April 21, 2006
- Recorded: 2004–2005
- Genre: Pop; pop rock
- Length: 71:37
- Label: Columbia
- Producer: Ingo Politz; Bernd Wendlandt

Silbermond chronology
Verschwende deine Zeit (2004)	Laut gedacht (2006)	Nichts passiert (2009)

Singles from Laut gedacht
- 1. "Unendlich" Released: March 31, 2006; 2. "Meer sein" Released: July 7, 2006; 3. "Das Beste" Released: October 6, 2006; 4. "Das Ende vom Kreis" Released: March 30, 2007

Professional ratings
Review scores
Source	Rating
CDStarts.de	6.5/10 stars
Laut.de	2/5 stars
LetMeEntertainYou.de	2/5 stars

Laut gedacht (Thinking Aloud) is the second studio album by German rock band Silbermond, released on April 21, 2006. Primarily produced by Ingo Politz and Bernd Wendlandt, the album peaked at #1 on the German and Austrian albums chart, and at #3 in Switzerland. Laut gedacht was released in three different versions: Basic Version, Standard Version and Premium Version.

The album cover features a looped square and a photo of the band.

== Track listing ==
Laut gedacht – Standard edition
No.	Title	Length
1.	"Meer sein"	4:26
2.	"Wenn die Anderen"	3:46
3.	"Das Ende vom Kreis"	4:05
4.	"Zu weit"	3:44
5.	"Unendlich"	6:53
6.	"In Zeiten wie diesen"	4:35
7.	"Das Beste"	4:45
8.	"Unerkannt"	3:56
9.	"Schick LOVE"	5:17
10.	"So wie jetzt"	5:15
11.	"Endlich"	3:59
12.	"Lebenszeichen"	4:03
13.	"Nein danke"	4:48
14.	"Kartenhaus"	3:15
15.	"Ich wünsch dir was"	4:10
Total length:		71:37

Laut gedacht – Reissue edition
No.	Title	Length
16.	"Das Beste (Single Version)"	4:25
17.	"Das Beste (Video)"	4:32

Laut gedacht – Live in Kamenz – Bonus DVD
No.	Title	Length
1.	"Intro"	3:27
2.	"Meer sein"	5:12
3.	"Du und ich"	3:36
4.	"A Stückl heile Welt"	4:24
5.	"Das Beste"	6:52
6.	"Zeit für Optimisten"	6:48
7.	"Immer am Limit"	6:54
8.	"Good Bye" (featuring Die Happy)	8:38
9.	"Durch die Nacht"	4:31
10.	"Symphonie"	5:44
11.	"Verschwende deine Zeit"	3:41
12.	"So wie jetzt"	5:28
13.	"Zu weit"	4:53

== Versions ==
=== Basic version ===
- Normal Album
- No Booklet
- Studio Report
- Sign: Red Sticker

=== Standard version ===
- Normal Album
- Booklet
- Studio Report
- Code for a Special Download Area at Silbermond's Homepage
- Sign: Green sticker

=== Premium version ===
- Normal Album
- Booklet
- Code
- Studio Report
- An 85 Minute DVD with the Highlights from the Verschwende deine Zeit-Abschlusskonzert and the Most Memorable Moments of Silbermond 2005.
- Sign: Blue sticker

== Charts ==
=== Weekly charts ===
Chart (2006)	Peak position
Austrian Albums (Ö3 Austria)	1
German Albums (Offizielle Top 100)	1
Swiss Albums (Schweizer Hitparade)	3

=== Year-end charts ===
Chart (2006)	Position
Austrian Albums (Ö3 Austria)	16
German Albums (Offizielle Top 100)	7
Swiss Albums (Schweizer Hitparade)	39
Chart (2007)	Position
Austrian Albums (Ö3 Austria)	57
German Albums (Offizielle Top 100)	27
Swiss Albums (Schweizer Hitparade)	70

== Certifications and sales ==
Region	Certification	Certified units/sales
Austria (IFPI Austria)	Platinum	30,000^{*}
Germany (BVMI)	3× Platinum	600,000^{^}
Switzerland (IFPI Switzerland)	Platinum	30,000^{^}
^{*} Sales figures based on certification alone.^{^} Shipments figures based on certification alone.
