= Nichts passiert =

Studio album by Silbermond
- Released: March 20, 2009
- Recorded: 2007–2009
- Genre: Pop, pop rock, German rock, alternative
- Length: 54:50 (standard version)
- Label: Sony Music Germany
- Producer: Ingo Politz, Bernd Wendlandt, Thomas Stolle

Silbermond chronology
Laut gedacht (2006)	Nichts passiert (2009)	Himmel auf (2012)

Singles from Nichts passiert
- 1. "Irgendwas bleibt" Released: February 20, 2009; 2. "Ich bereue nichts" Released: June 12, 2009; 3. "Krieger des Lichts" Released: October 16, 2009

Professional ratings
Review scores
Source	Rating
Laut.de	2/5 stars
CDStarts.de	6.5/10 stars
LetMeEntertainYou.de	3/5 stars
AllMusic	3.5/5 stars

Nichts passiert (Nothing Happens) is the third studio album by German band Silbermond. It was released on March 20, 2009. The album's lead single, Irgendwas bleibt, was released on February 20, 2009. The album debuted at #1 of the German, Austrian and Swiss album charts. In Germany, it remained there for three weeks.

== Track listing ==
Nichts passiert – Standard edition
No.	Title	Length
1.	"Alles Gute"	3:54
2.	"Nichts passiert"	4:03
3.	"Ich bereue nichts"	3:11
4.	"Irgendwas bleibt"	3:15
5.	"Tanz aus der Reihe"	2:40
6.	"Krieger des Lichts"	3:48
7.	"Nicht mein Problem" (featuring Jan Delay)	3:53
8.	"Keine Angst"	4:45
9.	"Die Liebe lässt mich nicht"	3:53
10.	"Nichts mehr"	5:38
11.	"Nach Haus"	3:27
12.	"Bist du dabei"	3:51
13.	"Weg für immer"	3:27
14.	"Sehn wir uns wieder" (featuring Xavier Naidoo)	5:07
Total length:		54:50

Nichts passiert – Bonus Mini-CD
No.	Title	Length
14.	"Der neueste Schrei"	3:58

Nichts passiert – Live in Oberhausen – Bonus DVD
No.	Title	Length
1.	"Das Ende vom Kreis"	6:00
2.	"Meer sein"	4:52
3.	"In Zeiten wie diesen"	4:43
4.	"Lebenszeichen"	4:37
5.	"Durch die Nacht"	4:54
6.	"Kartenhaus"	3:25
7.	"Basssolo"	2:12
8.	"Zeit für die Optimisten"	5:17
9.	"Symphonie"	4:58
10.	"Unendlich"	6:31
11.	"Bruderduell"	4:04
12.	"Wenn die anderen"	3:51
13.	"Das Beste"	7:06
14.	"Ich wünsch dir was"	4:30

== Charts ==
=== Weekly charts ===
Chart (2009)	Peak position
Austrian Albums (Ö3 Austria)	1
German Albums (Offizielle Top 100)	1
Swiss Albums (Schweizer Hitparade)	1

=== Year-end charts ===
Chart (2009)	Position
Austrian Albums (Ö3 Austria)	18
German Albums (Offizielle Top 100)	37
Swiss Albums (Schweizer Hitparade)	24
Chart (2010)	Position
German Albums (Offizielle Top 100)	73

== Certifications and sales ==
Region	Certification	Certified units/sales
Austria (IFPI Austria)	7× Gold	70,000^{*}
Germany (BVMI)	Platinum	200,000^{^}
Switzerland (IFPI Switzerland)	Platinum	30,000^{^}
^{*} Sales figures based on certification alone.^{^} Shipments figures based on certification alone.
