= Himmel auf =

Studio album by Silbermond
- Released: 23 March 2012
- Genre: Pop; pop rock
- Length: 54:46
- Label: Columbia
- Producer: Ingo Politz; Bernd Wendlandt; Thomas Stolle

Silbermond chronology
Nichts passiert (2009)	Himmel auf (2012)	Alles auf Anfang 2014–04 (2014)

Himmel auf (Sky Open) is the fourth studio album by German band Silbermond. It was released on 23 March 2012 by Columbia Records.

== Track listing ==
All song written by Thomas Stolle, Johannes Stolle, Andreas Nowak, and Stefanie Kloß.

No.	Title	Length
1.	"Unter der Oberfläche"	3:46
2.	"Gegen"	3:06
3.	"Himmel auf"	3:20
4.	"Wofür"	4:22
5.	"Ja"	5:10
6.	"Teil von mir"	3:54
7.	"Irgendwo in der Mitte"	4:24
8.	"FDSMH – Für dich schlägt mein Herz"	3:36
9.	"Weiße Fahnen"	4:36
10.	"Ans Meer"	3:28
11.	"Es geht weiter"	4:07
12.	"Waffen"	3:50
13.	"Du fehlst hier"	3:37
14.	"Das Gute gewinnt"	3:38

== Charts ==
=== Weekly charts ===
Chart (2012)	Peak position
Austrian Albums (Ö3 Austria)	2
German Albums (Offizielle Top 100)	2
Swiss Albums (Schweizer Hitparade)	3

=== Year-end charts ===
Chart (2012)	Position
Austrian Albums (Ö3 Austria)	49
German Albums (Offizielle Top 100)	12
Swiss Albums (Schweizer Hitparade)	25

== Certifications and sales ==
Region	Certification	Certified units/sales
Austria (IFPI Austria)	Gold	10,000^{*}
Germany (BVMI)	3× Gold	300,000^{^}
^{*} Sales figures based on certification alone.^{^} Shipments figures based on certification alone.

== Release history ==
Region	Date	Format	Label
Austria	23 March 2012	Digital download; CD	Columbia Records
Germany	23 March 2012	Digital download; CD	Columbia Records
Switzerland	23 March 2012	Digital download; CD	Columbia Records
