= Leichtes Gepäck =

Studio album by Silbermond
- Released: 27 November 2015
- Length: 47:59
- Label: Verschwende deine Zeit
- Producer: Thomas Stolle; Alexander Freund; Moritz Enders

Silbermond chronology
Alles auf Anfang 2014–04 (2014)	Leichtes Gepäck (2015)	Schritte (2019)

Leichtes Gepäck (Light Luggage) is the fifth studio album by German band Silbermond. It was released on 27 November 2015 by Verschwende deine Zeit GmbH.

== Critical reception ==
Professional ratings
Review scores
Source	Rating
laut.de	2/5 stars

laut.de editor Kai Butterweck found that "the respectable musical background only represents half of the overall product. The other belongs to Stefanie Kloß. And The Voice juror whines, whines and sighs once again. Those with good stories are always the brave ones, she whispers into the microphone at the beginning of the album. However, it takes three runs before you are sure that you have understood everything correctly. Every second syllable is drawn out like chewing gum. It goes up and down. The singer's hyper-emotional organ crawls through a bubbling swamp of poetry, either cheering to the heavens or saddened to death."

== Track listing ==
All songs written by Thomas Stolle, Johannes Stolle, Andreas Nowak, and Stefanie Kloß.

Leichtes Gepäck track listing
No.	Title	Length
1.	"Intro (Die Mutigen)"	3:06
2.	"Leichtes Gepäck"	3:52
3.	"B 96"	4:06
4.	"Langsam"	3:49
5.	"Indigo"	3:49
6.	"Das Leichteste der Welt"	4:01
7.	"Heut hab ich Zeit"	5:44
8.	"Lass mal"	3:32
9.	"Fische im Teich"	3:50
10.	"Allzu menschlich"	3:56
11.	"Himmel in die Stadt"	3:11
12.	"Zeit zu tanzen"	4:58
Total length:		47:59

== Charts ==
=== Weekly charts ===
Weekly chart performance for Leichtes Gepäck
Chart (2015)	Peak position
Austrian Albums (Ö3 Austria)	7
German Albums (Offizielle Top 100)	4
Swiss Albums (Schweizer Hitparade)	3

=== Year-end charts ===
Year-end chart performance for Leichtes Gepäck
Chart (2015)	Position
German Albums (Offizielle Top 100)	30

== Certifications and sales ==
Certifications for Leichtes Gepäck
Region	Certification	Certified units/sales
Germany (BVMI)	Platinum	200,000^{‡}
^{‡} Sales+streaming figures based on certification alone.

== Release history ==
Release history and formats for Leichtes Gepäck
Region	Date	Format	Label	Ref.
Various	27 November 2015	Digital download; CD	Verschwende deine Zeit	
