= Silbermond =

German pop/rock band

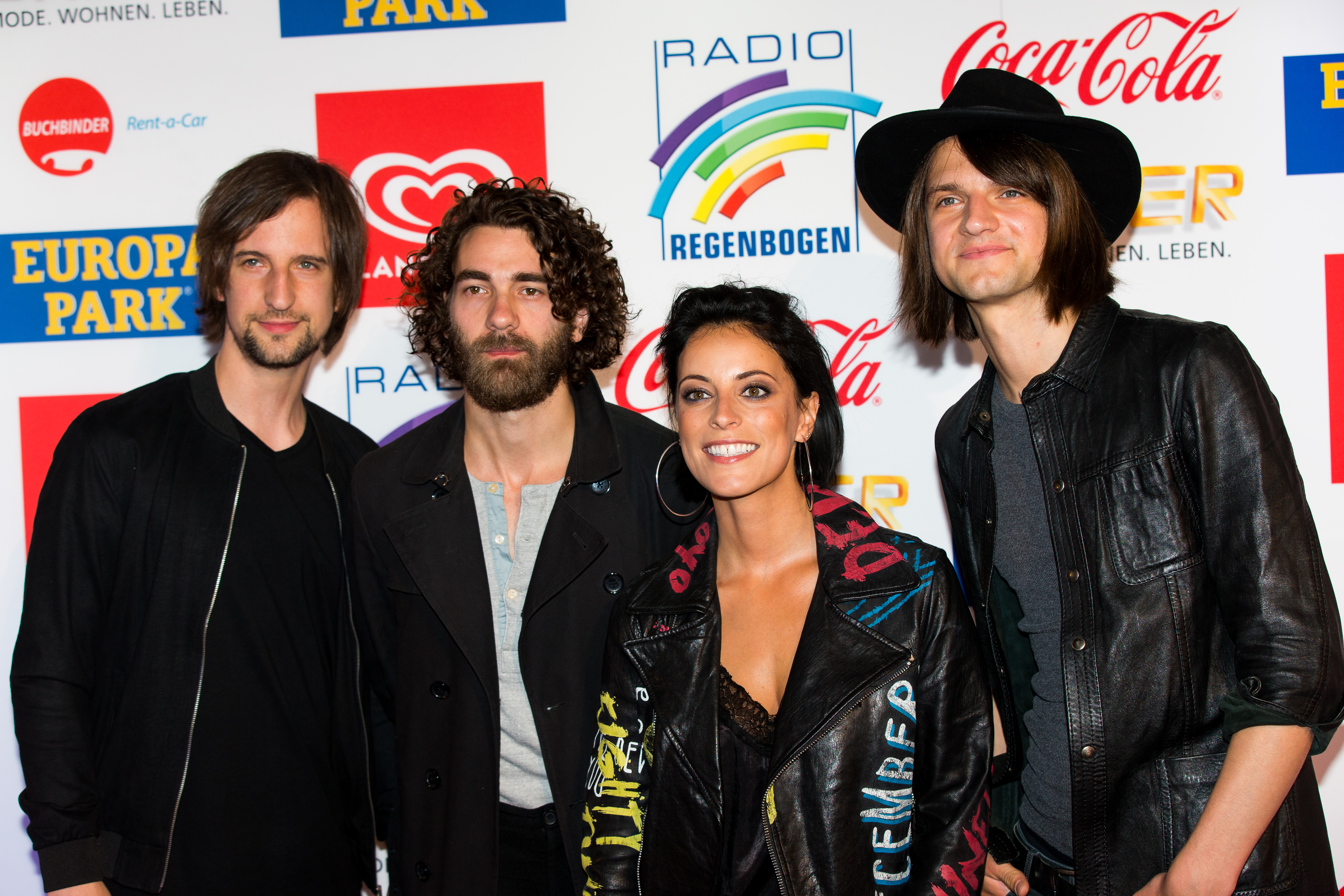
- Silbermond in 2017

Background information
- Also known as: Exakt; JAST
- Origin: Bautzen, Germany
- Genres: German rock; pop rock; pop
- Years active: 2000–present
- Labels: Verschwende deine Zeit
- Members: Stefanie Kloß; Andreas Nowak; Johannes Stolle; Thomas Stolle
- Website: silbermond.de

Silbermond ("silver moon") is a German pop rock band from Bautzen, Saxony. The band consists of Stefanie Kloß, Andreas Nowak, and brothers Johannes and Thomas Stolle.

== History ==
The band members originally met in 1998 when they participated in the music project Ten Sing. Two years later, they decided to form their own group, and as a result they began performing locally under the name JAST (composed by the initial letters of band members). In 2001, they changed their name to Silbermond, simultaneously concentrating on songs in German for the first time.

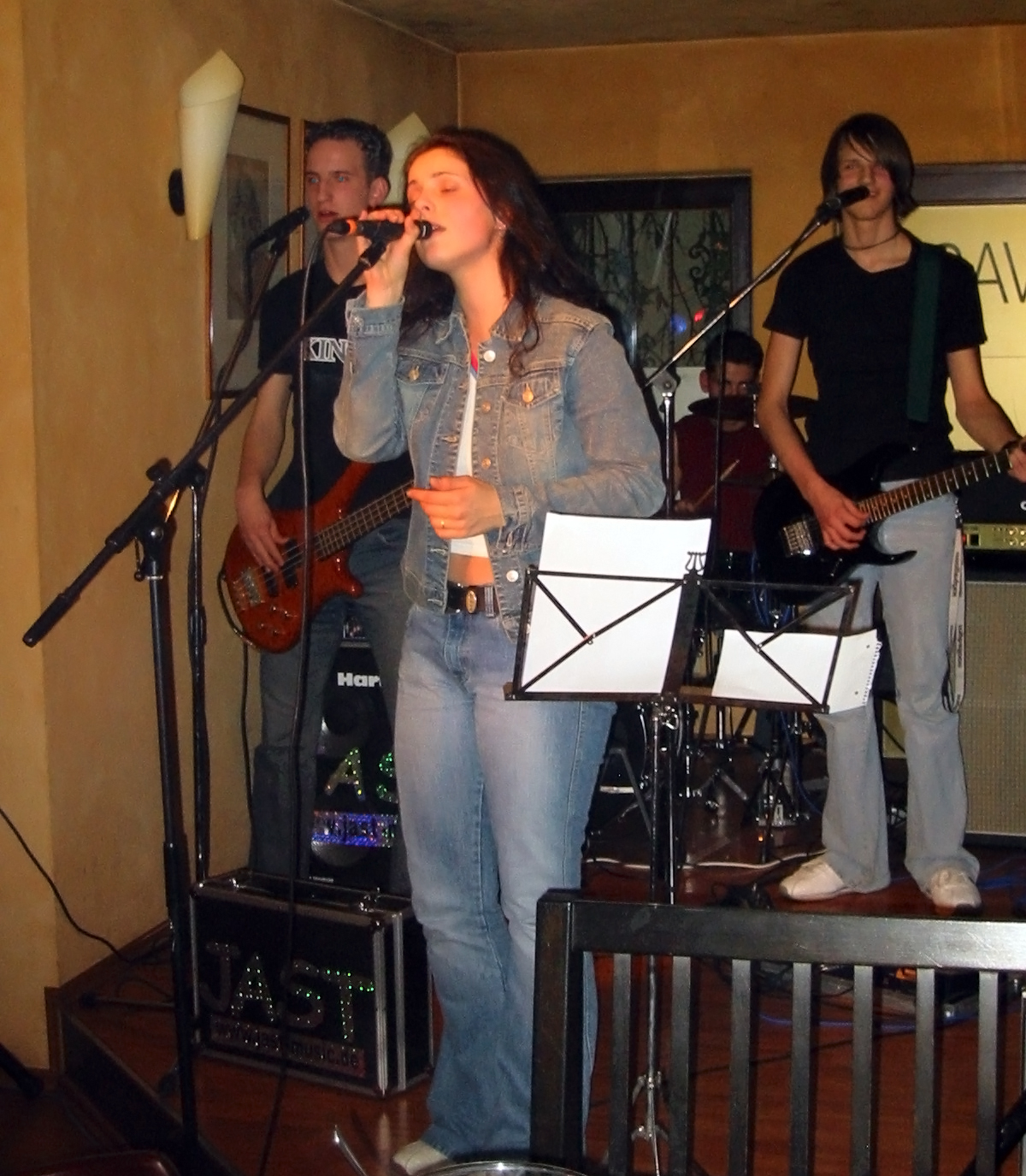
Silbermond as JAST in 2001

=== 2004–2008 ===
In January 2004, the group got the chance to perform as opening act for singer Jeanette Biedermann. Afterwards, they released their first single "Mach's dir selbst", followed-up by their debut album Verschwende deine Zeit, which became a major success and was eventually certified 7× gold and platinum in Germany and Austria. It spawned three further singles, including their first top-five hit "Symphonie". At the end of 2004, the band went on tour, and in April 2005 they published their first concert DVD Verschwende deine Zeit – Live, which reached gold status. In 2005, Silbermond participated in the Berlin installment of Live 8, where they performed "Zeit für Optimisten" after Green Day's set and before Chris De Burgh in the concert lineup.

In April 2006, Silbermond released their second album Laut gedacht. The album debuted at number one on the German and Austrian album charts and spawned another top-ten hit with its lead single "Unendlich". While the album's second single "Meer sein" failed to enter the top 30, its third single "Das Beste", released in October 2006, became the group's first number-one single. In July 2007, Silbemond performed at the German leg of Live Earth in Hamburg.

=== 2009–present ===
The band's third album, Nichts passiert, released in March 2009, became their first album to debut atop the Austrian, German and Swiss albums charts. It produced three singles, including "Irgendwas bleibt", Silbermond's second number-one hit, and third single "Krieger des Lichts", which reached the top ten in Germany. Also in 2009, Silbermond won the MTV Europe Music Award for Best German Act. In 2012, the fourth studio album, Himmel auf, was released. A top-three success, it reached gold status in Austria and 3× gold status in Germany. Its same-titled debut single peaked within the top five in Germany.

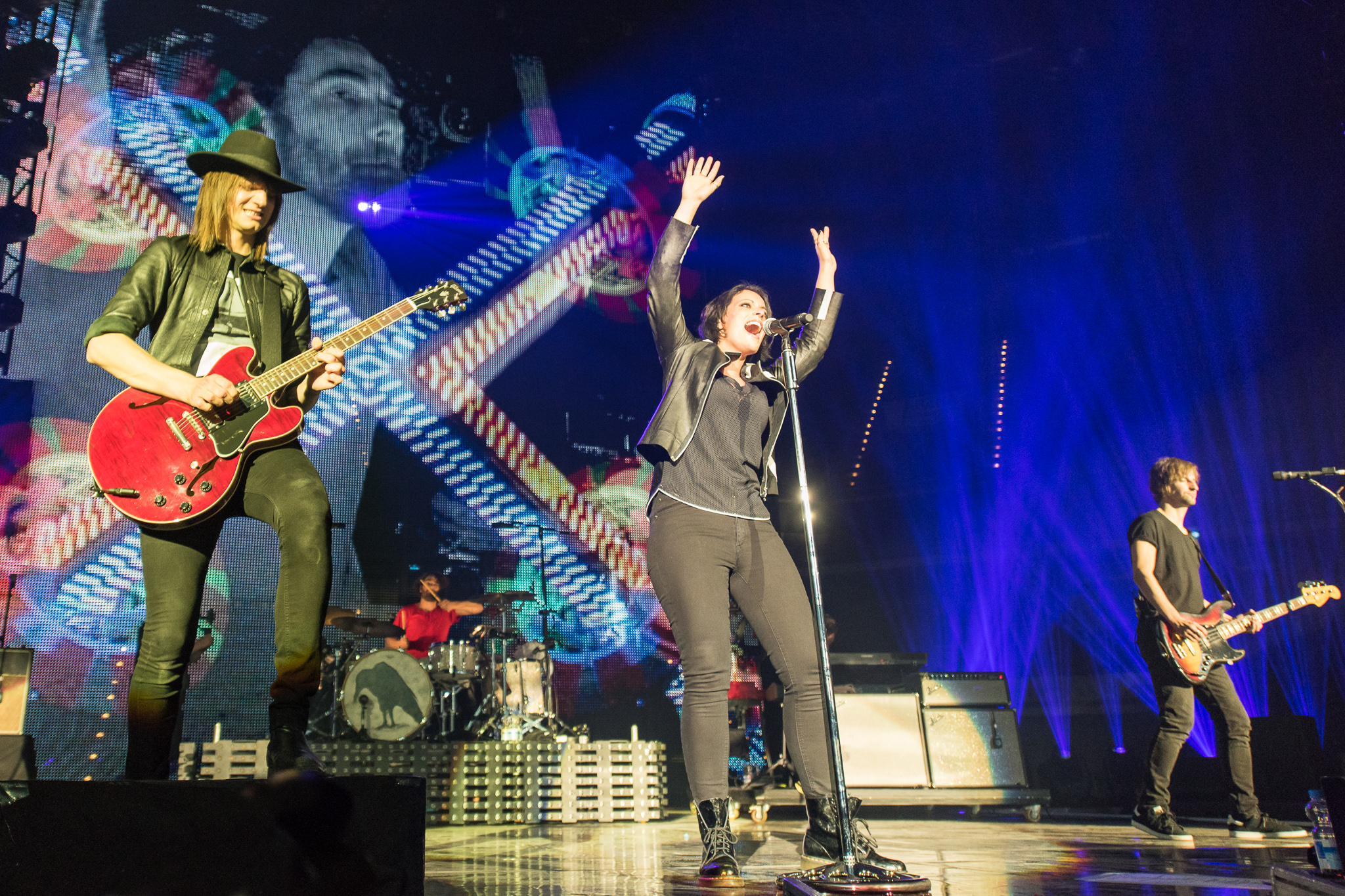
Silbermond in 2016

In 2014, Alles auf Anfang 2014–04, Silbermond's first compilation, was released. It reached the top ten in Austria and Switzerland and was certified gold by the BVMI. The same year, the band collaborated with Band Aid 30 Germany on a remake of "Do They Know It's Christmas?", which became another number-one hit in Germany. Also in 2014, lead singer Stefanie Kloß debuted as a coach on the reality competition television series The Voice of Germany.

Leichtes Gepäck, the group's fifth album, was released in November 2015. Recorded in Nashville, Tennessee, it reached the top five in Germany and Switzerland. In 2017, Kloß appeared on the fourth season of Sing meinen Song – Das Tauschkonzert, the German adaption of the TV series The Best Singers.

== Discography ==
=== Studio albums ===
- Verschwende deine Zeit (2004)
- Laut gedacht (2006)
- Nichts passiert (2009)
- Himmel auf (2012)
- Leichtes Gepäck (2015)
- Schritte (2019)
- Auf Auf (2023)

== Awards ==
=== 2004 ===
- New Faces Award
- Eins Live Krone – National Act

=== 2005 ===
- ECHO – "National Newcomer"
- Bravo Otto – "Superband"
- Comet – "Best Live Act"
- Eins Live Krone – "Best Band"

=== 2007 ===
- ECHO – Song of the year "Das Beste"
- ECHO – Best Live Act
- Comet – Best Live Act

=== 2009 ===
- MTV Europe Music Award – Best German Act
- Bambi – Category Pop National

=== 2010 ===
- ECHO – Best National Act
- ECHO – Best Live Act
- Comet – Best National Act
- Comet – Best Video (Krieger des Lichts)

=== 2011 ===
- ECHO – Radio-ECHO (Krieger des Lichts)
- ECHO – Ehren-Preis (For their charity work [Fans Helfen])
- Drums.de Musik-Fach-Award – Best Music Act 2011
