= Verschwende Deine Zeit =

Verschwende deine Zeit

Studio album by Silbermond
- Released: July 12, 2004
- Recorded: 2002–2004
- Genre: Pop; pop rock
- Length: 54:48
- Label: Modul
- Producer: Ingo Politz; Bernd Wendlandt

Silbermond chronology
Verschwende deine Zeit (2004)	Laut gedacht (2006)

Singles from Verschwende deine Zeit
- 1. "Mach’s dir selbst" Released: March 1, 2004; 2. "Durch die Nacht" Released: June 1, 2004; 3. "Symphonie" Released: September 29, 2004; 4. "Zeit für Optimisten" Released: March 21, 2005

Professional ratings
Review scores
Source	Rating
CDStarts.de	2/5 stars
Laut.de	2/5 stars

Verschwende deine Zeit (Waste Your Time) is the debut album by German rock group Silbermond, released on July 12, 2004. Primarily produced by Ingo Politz and Bernd Wendlandt, the album peaked at number 3 on the German Albums Chart and at number in Austria, eventually receiving double platinum status in both countries. On November 11, 2004, Verschwende deine Zeit was re-released as a Special Edition.

== Track listing ==
Verschwende Deine Zeit – Standard edition
No.	Title	Length
1.	"Verschwende Deine Zeit [Waste Your Time]"	3:24
2.	"Mach’s dir selbst [Do It Yourself]"	2:47
3.	"Durch die Nacht [Through the Night]"	4:10
4.	"Du & ich [You & I]"	3:50
5.	"An dich [To You]"	3:17
6.	"Passend gemacht [Made to Fit]"	3:16
7.	"Symphonie [Symphony]"	4:33
8.	"1000 Fragen [1000 Questions]"	3:59
9.	"A Stückl heile Welt [A Piece of Ideal World]"	3:22
10.	"Nicht verdient [Not Deserved]"	3:20
11.	"Letzte Bahn [Last Train]"	4:10
12.	"1, 2, 3"	2:13
13.	"Ohne Dich [Without You]"	3:05
14.	"Wissen was wird [To Know What Will Happen]"	4:17
15.	"Immer am Limit [Always at the Limit]"	4:04
Total length:		54:48

Verschwende Deine Zeit – Reissue edition
No.	Title	Length
16.	"Symphonie" (Backstage Version)	3:53
17.	"Symphonie" (OnStage Version)	3:58
18.	"Symphonie" (Video)	8:18

== Charts ==
=== Weekly charts ===
Chart (2004)	Peak position
Austrian Albums (Ö3 Austria)	4
German Albums (Offizielle Top 100)	3
Swiss Albums (Schweizer Hitparade)	18

=== Year-end charts ===
Chart (2004)	Position
Austrian Albums (Ö3 Austria)	33
German Albums (Offizielle Top 100)	13
Chart (2005)	Position
Austrian Albums (Ö3 Austria)	29
German Albums (Offizielle Top 100)	15
Swiss Albums (Schweizer Hitparade)	57

== Certifications and sales ==
Region	Certification	Certified units/sales
Austria (IFPI Austria)	Platinum	30,000^{*}
Germany (BVMI)	7× Gold	700,000^{^}
Switzerland (IFPI Switzerland)	Gold	20,000^{^}
^{*} Sales figures based on certification alone.^{^} Shipments figures based on certification alone.

== Release history ==
Region	Date	Edition	Format	Label
Austria	12 July 2004	Standard	Digital download, CD	Modul
Germany	12 July 2004	Standard	Digital download, CD	Modul
Switzerland	12 July 2004	Standard	Digital download, CD	Modul
Austria	11 November 2004	Special	Digital download, CD	Modul
Germany	11 November 2004	Special	Digital download, CD	Modul
Switzerland	11 November 2004	Special	Digital download, CD	Modul
