= The Voice of Germany season 10 =

Season of television series

The Voice of Germany
- Season 10
- Promotional poster featuring coaches Santos, Samu & Rea, Stefanie & Yvonne, and Forster
- Hosted by: Thore Schölermann; Annemarie Carpendale (blind auditions, battle rounds, sing offs); Lena Gercke (live shows)
- Coaches: Mark Forster; Yvonne Catterfeld & Stefanie Kloß; Nico Santos; Samu Haber & Rea Garvey; Michael Schulte (comeback stage)
- Winner: Paula Dalla Corte
- Winning coach: Samu Haber & Rea Garvey
- Runner-up: Oliver Henrich

Release
- Original network: ProSieben; Sat.1
- Original release: October 8 – December 20, 2020

Season chronology
- ← Previous; Season 9 Next → Season 11

The tenth season, also known as the anniversary season of the talent show The Voice of Germany premiered on October 8, 2020 on ProSieben and on October 11, 2020 on Sat.1.

Mark Forster, Yvonne Catterfeld & Stefanie Kloß, Nico Santos, Samu Haber & Rea Garvey are the main coaches this season, while Michael Schulte replaced Santos as The Voice: Comeback Stage by SEAT's coach.

Thore Schölermann returned for his ninth season as host. Lena Gercke also returned for her sixth season as host, but only hosted the live shows due to her pregnancy. Annemarie Carpendale replaced Gercke in others stages of the season.

Paula Dalla Corte was named the winner of the season on December 20, 2020 and Samu Haber & Rea Garvey became the third duo coach to win The Voice of Germany.

== Production ==
=== Coaches and hosts ===
Main coaches of season 10 of The Voice of Germany

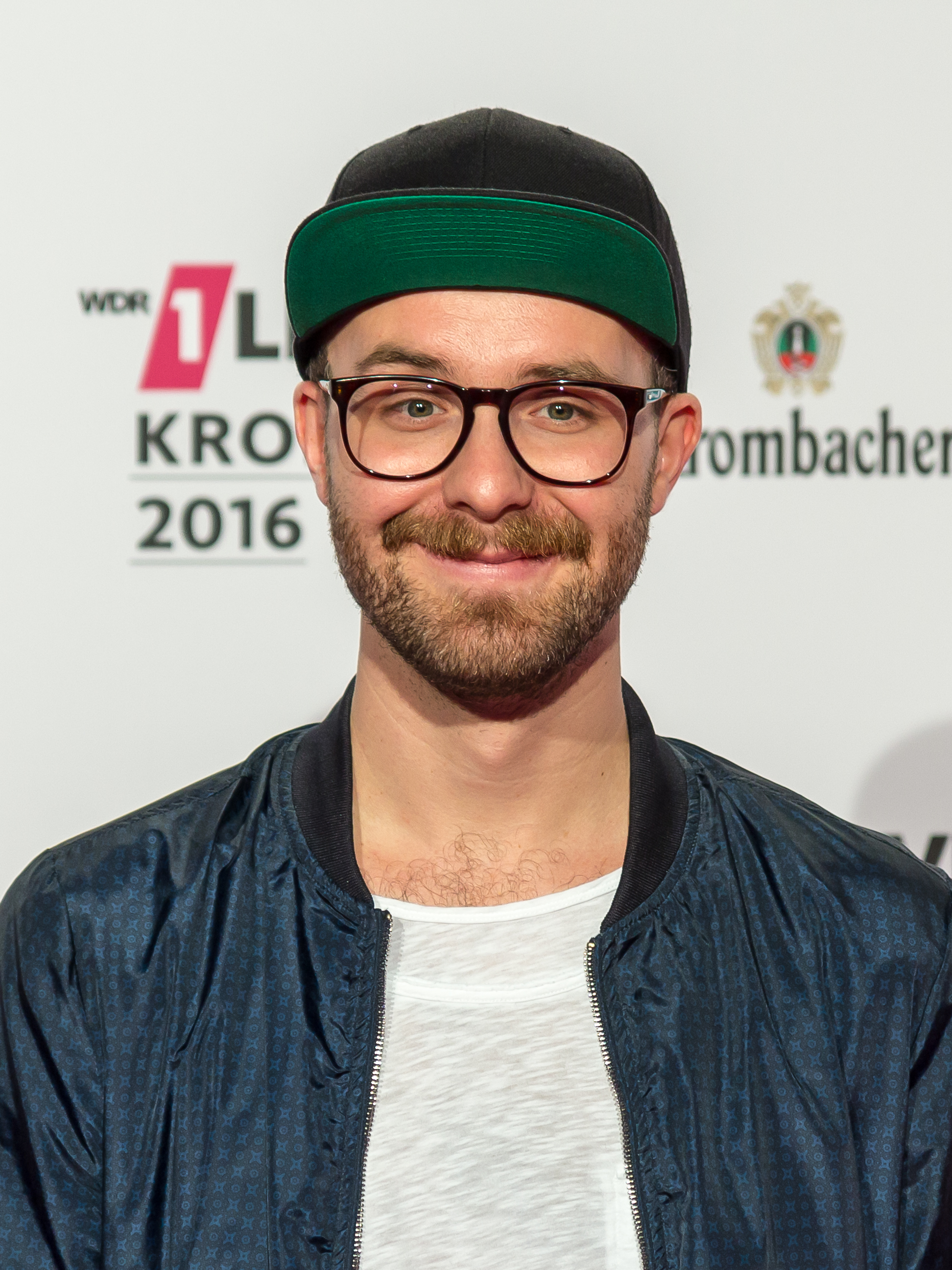
Mark Forster

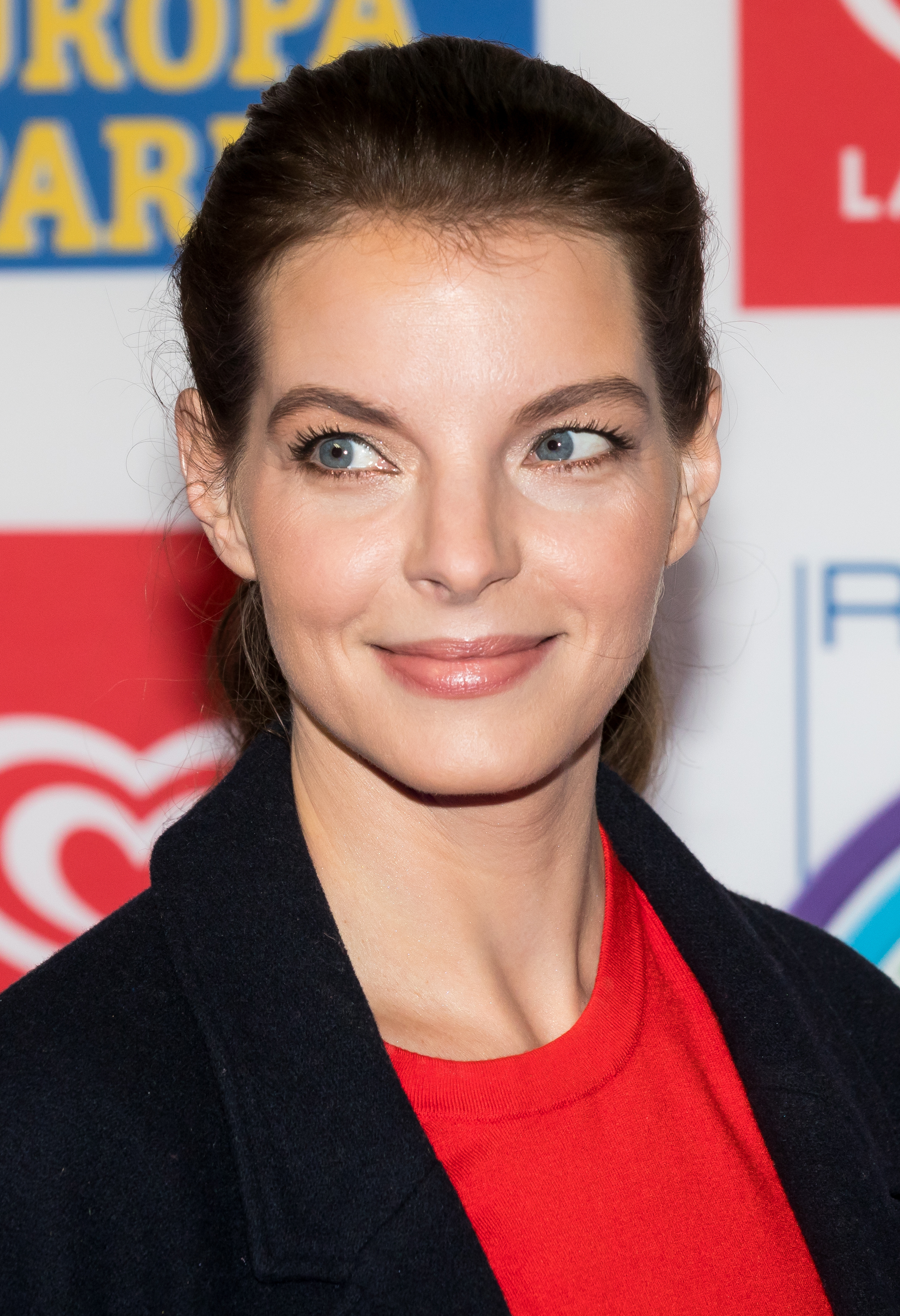
Yvonne Catterfeld

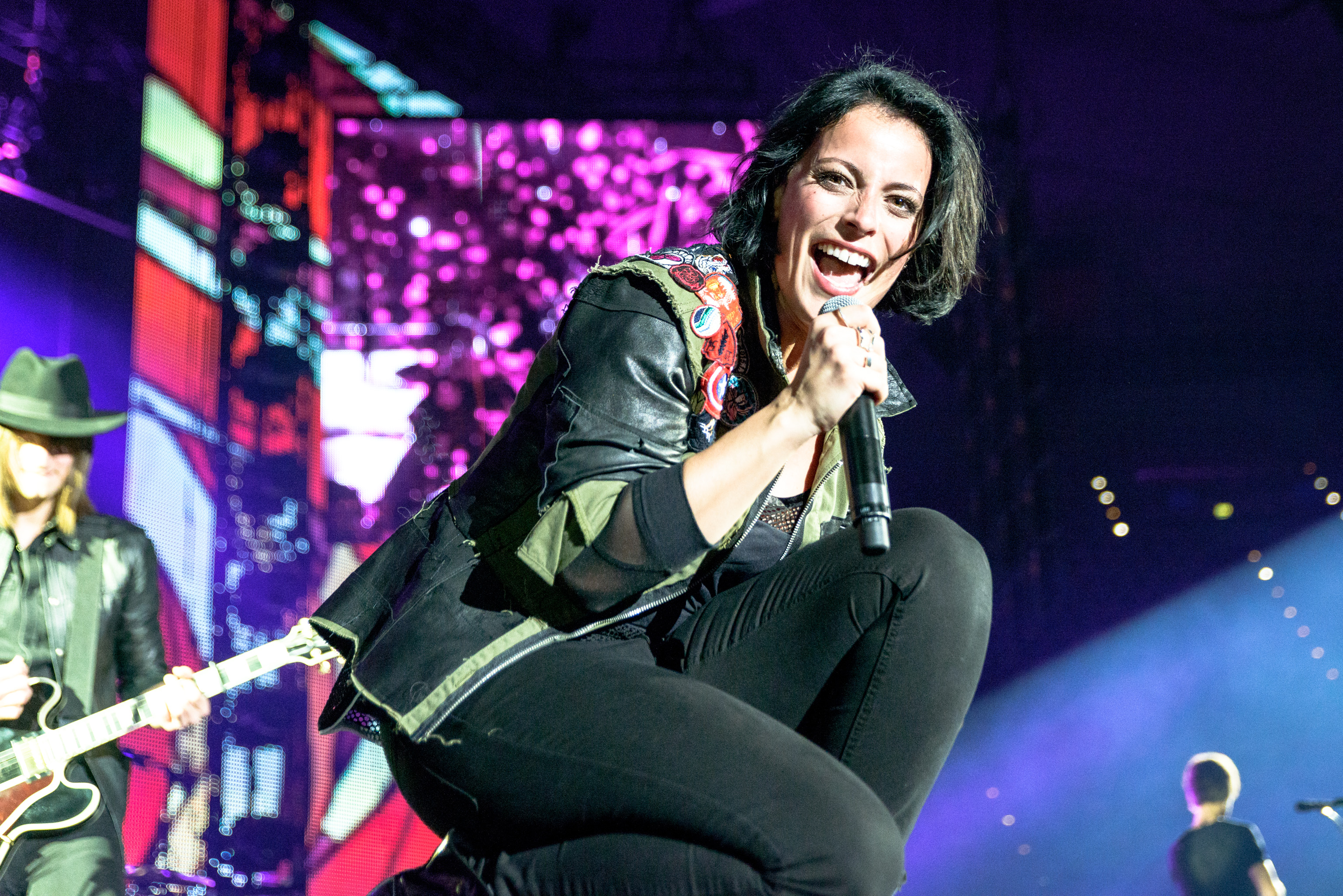
Stefanie Kloss

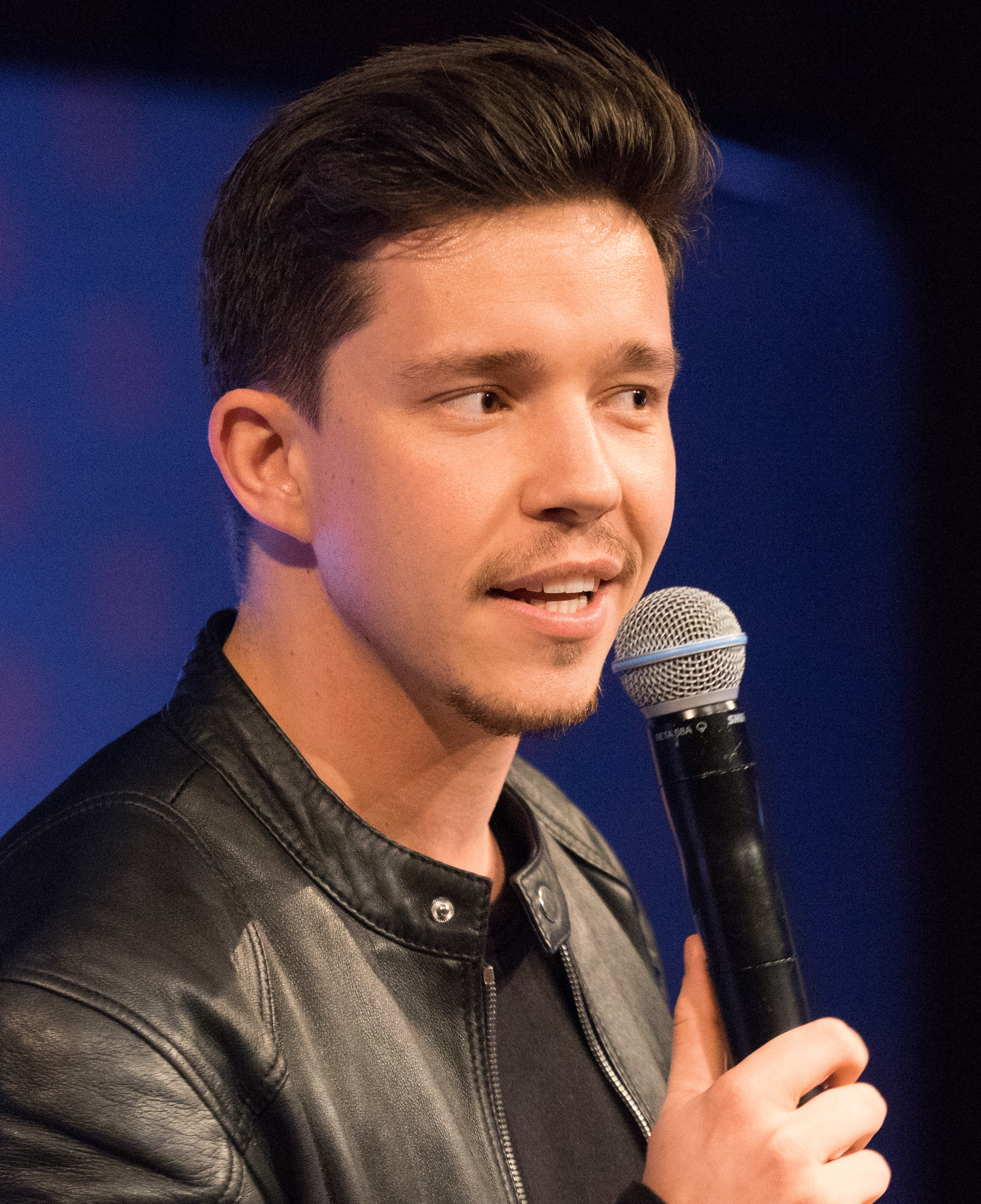
Nico Santos

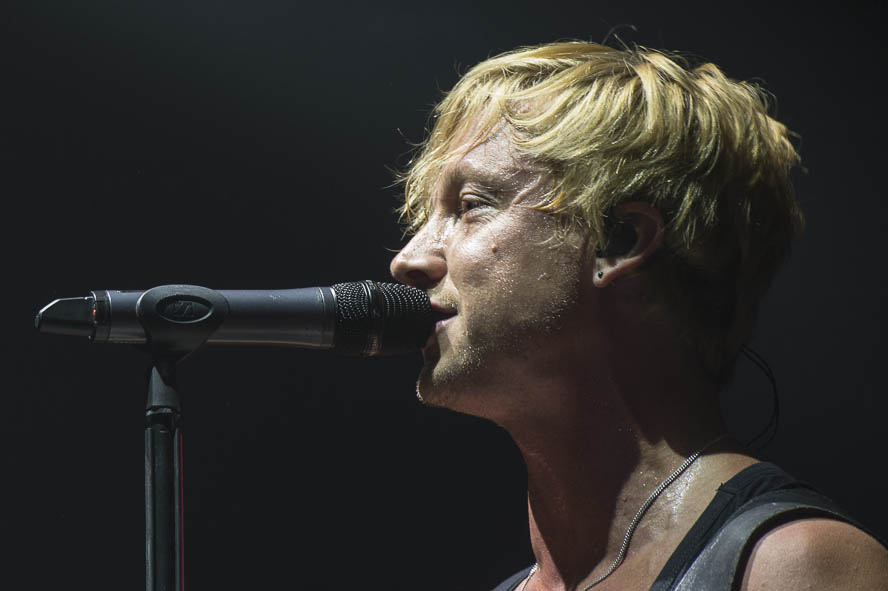
Samu Haber

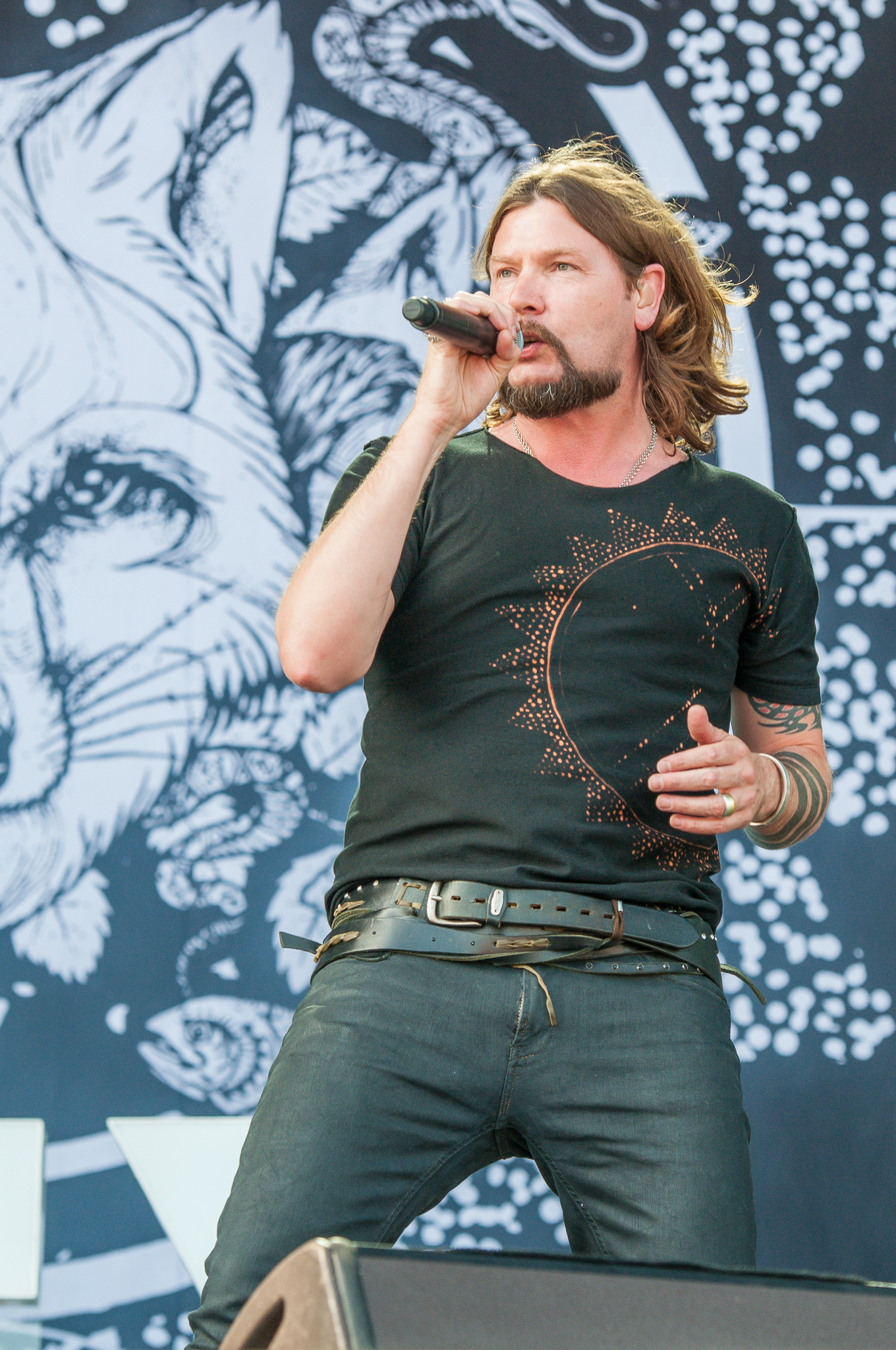
Rea Garvey

On June 19, 2020, it was announced that Sido would not be returning to the show. On June 25, 2020, it was announced that Alice Merton would also not return. The new panel and hosts were announced on July 17, 2020.

For the first time in The Voice of Germany history as well as the franchise globally, there are 2 duo and 2 solo coaches in the panel, bringing the total number of panelists to 6. Mark Forster, Rea Garvey and Nico Santos returned as coaches for the tenth season, with Santos becoming a main coach after coaching The Voice: Comeback Stage by SEAT last season and Garvey teamed up with Samu Haber, who rejoined the panel after a two-year hiatus, to form a new duo coach. Meanwhile, Yvonne Catterfeld and Stefanie Kloss reprised their role as coaches after a one-year and four-year hiatus respectively and paired up as a new duo coach. Making this the first season to feature two female coaches.

Thore Schölermann returned for his 9th season as host. It was announced that Lena Gercke would not be returning as host due to her pregnancy, but eventually returned to host the live shows. Annemarie Carpendale replaced Gercke as the host the blind auditions, battle rounds and sing offs. On July 21, 2020, it was announced that season 1's finalist Michael Schulte would become The Voice: Comeback Stage by SEAT's new coach, mentoring unsuccessful auditioners as well as eliminated artists from later rounds of the competition, on the online version .

This season features 10 contestants who had previously appeared on previous seasons of the show, they are called the "All-stars".

=== Scouting ===
The scoutings with the producers began on February 7, 2020 in Hamburg and ended on February 29, 2020 in Berlin but not shown on television. On April 17 and 18, 2020, it was announced that the Last Chance Days which would take place in Berlin was cancelled because of the coronavirus pandemic in Germany, but the production announced that the participants could send a video to apply for this season.

Scoutings
City	Date(s)	Venue
Hamburg	February 7–8, 2020	Renaissance Hamburg Hotel
Frankfurt	February 10–11, 2020	Dorint Hotel Main-Taunus-Zentrum Frankfurt/Sulzbach
Cologne	February 14–16, 2020	Park Inn by Radisson Köln City West
Stuttgart	February 18–19, 2020	DORMERO Hotel Stuttgart
Munich	February 21–22, 2020	Steigenberger Hotel München
Berlin	February 29, 2020	Hotel Courtyard by Marriott

== Teams ==
Main Competition

- Winner
- Runner-up
- Third place
- Fourth place
- Fifth place
- Eliminated in the Semi-final
- Eliminated but selected to participate in Comeback Stage
- Eliminated in the Sing Off
- Stolen in the Battle rounds
- Eliminated in the Battle rounds
- Withdrew

Comeback Stage

- Eliminated in the finals
- Eliminated in the third rounds
- Eliminated in the second rounds
- Eliminated in the first rounds

Coach	Top 80 Artists				
Mark Forster					
Mark Forster	Tosari Udayana	Sion Jung	ONAIR	Alexandra Jörg	Maciek
Mark Forster	Ninorta Coban	Finton Mumbure	Jan-Luca Bina	Jonnes Vennemann-Schmidt	Claire Litzler
Mark Forster	Natalie Behnisch	Michael Caliman	Cathalin Kuhnhardt	Targol Dalirazar	Alessandro Rinella
Mark Forster	Erwin Holm	Marc Gensior	Florian Ritzi	Eugene Asira	Kim Unger
Yvonne Catterfeld & Stefanie Kloß					
Yvonne Catterfeld & Stefanie Kloß	Oliver Henrich	Juan Geck	Noah Sam Honegger	Alessandro Pola	Maria Nicolaides
Yvonne Catterfeld & Stefanie Kloß	Vojtech Zakouril	Dimi Rompos	Max Glatzel	Manuel Suss	Leo Engels
Yvonne Catterfeld & Stefanie Kloß	Isabel Nolte	Keye Katcher	~~Anastasia Blevins~~	~~Marvin Scondo~~	~~Maciek~~
Yvonne Catterfeld & Stefanie Kloß	~~Hannah Wilhelm~~	George Philippart	Gerald Oppong	Reginald Holden Jennings	Etienne Wiebe
Nico Santos					
Nico Santos	Jonas & Mael	Nico Traut	Max Lenz	BB Thomaz	Janina Beyerlein
Nico Santos	Hannah Wilhelm	Manuel Lojo	Leon "Ezo" Weick	Pamela Falcon	Marvin Scondo
Nico Santos	Simon Paterno	~~Isabel Nolte~~	~~Sion Jung~~	~~Andrew Reyes~~	Emmanuel Sandoval Santillan
Nico Santos	Julia Köster	Kimia Scharlett Rotm	Jana Glawischnig	Michelle Schulz	Mohammed Alsharif
Samu Haber & Rea Garvey					
Samu Haber & Rea Garvey	Paula Dalla Corte	Matthias Nebel	Esther Nkongo	Sean Koch	Antonio Esposito
Samu Haber & Rea Garvey	Lorena Daum	Wolfgang Herbst	Andrew Reyes	Douglas Adkins	Celine Hammerling
Samu Haber & Rea Garvey	Anastasia Blevins	Claudia Pahl	~~Oliver Henrich~~	Duc-Nam Trinh	Katiuska McLean
Samu Haber & Rea Garvey	Max Kropius	Danica Mae Miranda	Julian Jas	Lisa-Marie Christ	Alex Hartung
Michael Schulte					
Michael Schulte	Alessandro Pola	Mickela Löffel	Max Lenz	Keye Katcher	Claudia Pahl
Michael Schulte	Alexander Seeger	Jay Gomes	Mark Ledlin	Christian Reisinger	Aisha Diabaté
Michael Schulte	Richie Gooding	Karin Hagendorfer			
Note: Italicized names are stolen artists (names struck through within former teams). The Grey names are eliminated artists selected to participate in Comeback Stage and the Underlined name is its winner who advanced in the Live Shows.

== Blind auditions ==
The blind auditions were recorded from July 17, 2020 to July 22, 2020 at Studio Adlershof in Berlin and were broadcast from October 8, 2020 until November 5, 2020, being broadcast every Thursday on ProSieben and every Sunday on Sat.1.

Color key

✔	Coach hit his/her "I WANT YOU" button
	Artist defaulted to this coach's team
	Artist elected to join this coach's team
	Artist was eliminated and was not invited back for "Comeback Stage"
	Artist was eliminated, but got a second chance to compete in "Comeback Stage"
	Artist is an 'Allstar' contestant

=== Episode 1 (October 8) ===
The first blind audition episode was broadcast on October 8, 2020 on ProSieben.

- Coaches Performance: "Viva la Vida"

Order	Artist	Age	Song	Coach's and artist's choices			
Order	Artist	Age	Song	Mark	Yvonne & Stefanie	Nico	Samu & Rea
1	Alessandro Pola	30	"If I Ain't Got You"	✔	✔	✔	✔
2	Celine Hammerling	19	"Big in Japan"	✔	–	–	✔
3	Christiane Reiter	49	"We Don't Need Another Hero"	–	–	–	–
4	Nico Traut	22	"Play with Fire"	✔	✔	✔	✔
5	Pamela Falcon	62	"Help!"	✔	–	✔	–
6	Kira Reed	26	"Physical"	–	–	–	–
7	Florian Ritzi	36	"Song 2"	✔	–	✔	✔
8	Mickela Löffel	25	"Das Leben ist schön"	–	–	–	–
9	ONAIR	36-43	"Stairway to Heaven"	✔	–	✔	–
10	Lorena Daum	27	"Since U Been Gone"	✔	–	–	✔
11	Noah Sam Honegger	22	"Riding to New York"	✔	✔	✔	–

=== Episode 2 (October 11) ===
The second blind audition episode was broadcast on October 11, 2020 on Sat.1.

Order	Artist	Age	Song	Coach's and artist's choices			
Order	Artist	Age	Song	Mark	Yvonne & Stefanie	Nico	Samu & Rea
1	Kim Unger	25	"All About That Bass"	✔	✔	✔	–
2	Marvin Scondo	31	"(Sittin' On) The Dock of the Bay"	✔	✔	✔	✔
3	Nina Berg	20	"Achterbahn"	–	–	–	–
4	Paula Dalla Corte	19	"Roar"	✔	✔	✔	✔
5	Emmanuel Sandoval Santillan	25	"Chasing Cars" (Spanish version)	✔	–	✔	✔
6	Katja Oseloff	22	"Bonfire"	–	–	–	–
7	Max Glatzel	21	"Friends"	✔	✔	–	–
8	Jonas & Mael	19/24	"Sucker"	✔	✔	✔	✔
9	Karin Hagendorfer	32	"You Shook Me All Night Long"	–	–	–	–
10	Hanna Rinella	41	"No More 'I Love You's"	–	–	–	–
11	Alessandro Rinella	47	"Il mare calmo della sera"	✔	–	✔	– ^{1}
12	Matthias Nebel	28	"Sign of the Times"	✔	✔	✔	✔

- ^1 Samu and Rea pressed their button but was too late so the turn did not count.

=== Episode 3 (October 15) ===
The third blind audition episode was broadcast on October 15, 2020 on ProSieben.

Order	Artist	Age	Song	Coach's and artist's choices			
Order	Artist	Age	Song	Mark	Yvonne & Stefanie	Nico	Samu & Rea
1	Ninorta Coban	26	"Good as Hell"	✔	–	✔	–
2	Max Lenz	18	"Falling"	✔	✔	✔	✔
3	Christin Borkowski	32	"Alles brennt"	–	–	–	–
4	Hannah Wilhelm	23	"Underdog"	✔	✔	✔	–
5	Cathalin Kuhnhardt	30	"Du hast den Farbfilm vergessen"	✔	–	–	–
6	Alexander Strebl	25	"Footloose"	–	–	–	–
7	Wolfgang Herbst	50	"Nur geträumt"	✔	✔	✔	✔
8	Anne-Sophie Kieseler	26	"The Climb"	–	–	–	–
9	Jay Gomes	34	"Mi Gente"	–	–	–	–
10	Jana Glawischnig	20	"Dance Monkey"	–	–	✔	–
11	Juan Geck	28	"Anyone"	✔	✔	✔	✔

=== Episode 4 (October 18) ===
The fourth blind audition episode was broadcast on October 18, 2020 on Sat.1.

Order	Artist	Age	Song	Coach's and artist's choices			
Order	Artist	Age	Song	Mark	Yvonne & Stefanie	Nico	Samu & Rea
1	Andrew Reyes	31	"Don't Let the Sun Go Down on Me"	✔	–	✔	–
2	Kimia Scharlett Roth	45	"Never Tear Us Apart"	✔	✔	✔	–
3	Gerald Oppong	31	"Memories"	–	✔	–	✔
4	Theo Bormann	26	"What I've Done"	–	–	–	–
5	George Philippart	30	"Si t'étais là"	✔	✔	✔	–
6	Helmut Anton Wiemer	52	"Sexy"	–	–	–	–
7	Janina Beyerlein	20	"Always Remember Us This Way"	–	✔	✔	✔
8	Finton Mumbure	34	"Redemption Song"	✔	–	–	–
9	Tanja Huber	23	"Domino"	–	–	–	–
10	Leon "Ezo" Weick	23	"Mascheregen"	✔	–	✔	–
11	Richie Gooding	36	"Chandelier"	–	–	–	–
12	Sean Koch	25	"Circles"	✔	✔	✔	✔

=== Episode 5 (October 22) ===
The fifth blind audition episode was broadcast on October 22, 2020 on ProSieben.

Order	Artist	Age	Song	Coach's and artist's choices			
Order	Artist	Age	Song	Mark	Yvonne & Stefanie	Nico	Samu & Rea
1	Karen Danger	23	"Queen of the Night"	–	–	–	–
2	Douglas Adkins	56	"Achy Breaky Heart"	✔	–	–	✔
3	Dimi Rompos	30	"Ich wünschte du kannst das sehen"	✔	✔	–	–
4	Alexander Wynands	30	"All the Small Things"	–	–	–	–
5	Sion Jung	17	"Slow Dancing in the Dark"	–	–	✔	–
6	Anastasia Blevins	19	"The Bare Necessities"	✔	✔	✔	✔
7	Erwin Holm	25	"Castle on the Hill"	✔	–	–	–
8	Reginald Holden Jennings	55	"(Your Love Keeps Lifting Me) Higher and Higher"	✔	✔	–	–
9	Claudia Pahl	25	"Amazing Grace"	✔	–	✔	✔
10	Aisha Diabaté	22	"On était beau"	–	–	–	–
11	Manuel Suss	22	"Lucifer"	✔	✔	✔	✔

=== Episode 6 (October 25) ===
The sixth blind audition episode was broadcast on October 25, 2020 on Sat.1.

Order	Artist	Age	Song	Coach's and artist's choices			
Order	Artist	Age	Song	Mark	Yvonne & Stefanie	Nico	Samu & Rea
1	Maria Nicolaides	27	"American Boy"	–	✔	–	–
2	Alex Hartung	29	"Poesiealbum"	✔	–	–	✔
3	Ekaterina Tsenkova	29	"Think Twice"	–	–	–	–
4	Julia Köster	27	"Bulletproof"	✔	✔	✔	✔
5	Linda & Vincent	25/25	"Shake Away"	–	–	–	–
6	Michelle Schulz	21	"Vincent"	✔	–	✔	✔
7	Oliver Henrich	38	"Kings and Queens"	✔	✔	✔	✔
8	Julian Jas	25	"Heast as net"	–	–	–	✔
9	Taschira Dell'Era	30	"I Like It"	–	–	–	–
10	Alexandra Jörg	43	"Die Kleptomanin"	✔	–	✔	–
11	Mark Ledlin	22	"Grow as We Go"	–	–	–	–
12	Katiuska McLean	42	"Live and Let Die"	–	–	✔	✔

=== Episode 7 (October 29) ===
The seventh blind audition episode was broadcast on October 29, 2020 on ProSieben.

Order	Artist	Age	Song	Coach's and artist's choices			
Order	Artist	Age	Song	Mark	Yvonne & Stefanie	Nico	Samu & Rea
1	Danica Mae Miranda	23	"Bang Bang"	–	✔	✔	✔
2	Jan-Luca Bina	22	"Tainted Love"	✔	–	–	–
3	Leo Engels	21	"Let Her Go"	–	✔	–	✔
4	Marina Brunner	29	"I Love It"	–	–	–	–
5	Eugene Asira	23	"Uliza Kiatu"	✔	✔	✔	✔
6	Luisa Skrabic	27	"Durch die Nacht"	–	–	–	–
7	Manuel Lojo	44	"Ai Se Eu Te Pego"	–	–	✔	–
8	Lisa-Marie Christ	25	"What Is Love"	✔	✔	✔	✔
9	Isabel Nolte	32	"Als ich Fortging"	✔	–	✔	✔
10	Alexander Seeger	21	"Dive"	–	–	–	–
11	Maciek	27	"You Gotta Be"	✔	✔	✔	✔

=== Episode 8 (November 1) ===
The eighth blind audition episode was broadcast on November 1, 2020 on Sat.1.

Order	Artist	Age	Song	Coach's and artist's choices			
Order	Artist	Age	Song	Mark	Yvonne & Stefanie	Nico	Samu & Rea
1	Natalie Behnisch	17	"I Will Survive"	✔	–	✔	–
2	Duc-Nam Trinh	19	"Here Comes the Sun"	✔	–	–	✔
3	Sebastian Frisch	52	"Du"	–	–	–	–
4	Vojtech Zakouril	24	"California Dreamin'"	✔	✔	✔	✔
5	Esther Nkongo	24	"On and on"	–	–	–	✔
6	Christian Reisinger	34	"I'm Always Here"	–	–	–	–
7	Antonio Esposito	29	"Zuhause ist wir"	✔	–	–	✔
8	Claire Litzler	29	"No Surprises"	✔	–	✔	–
9	Marc Gensior	53	"I Still Haven't Found What I'm Looking For"	✔	–	–	–
10	Gregory Krause	20	"Männer"	–	–	–	–
11	Keye Katcher	29	"Rise Up"	✔	✔	–	–
12	Julia Paul	34	"Old Town Road"	–	–	–	–
13	Mohammed Alsharif	26	"Mich Aam Tezbat Maii"	✔	–	✔	✔

=== Episode 9 (November 5) ===
The ninth and final blind audition episode was broadcast on November 5, 2020 on ProSieben.

Order	Artist	Age	Song	Coach's and artist's choices			
Order	Artist	Age	Song	Mark	Yvonne & Stefanie	Nico	Samu & Rea
1	Simon Paterno	37	"Rock with You"	✔	–	✔	–
2	Philipp Brücher	27	"Jein"	–	–	–	–
3	Targol Dalirazar	37	"Nah Neh Nah"	✔	–	–	✔
4	Michael Caliman	30	"Control"	✔	✔	✔	—
5	Anne Flach	29	"Jesus, Take the Wheel"	–	–	–	–
6	Andrew Phillip Boller	65	"Don't Be Cruel"	–	–	–	–
7	Tosari Udayana	19	"You Say"	✔	–	–	–
8	BB Thomaz	36	"Sex on Fire"	–	✔	✔	–
9	Marcel Kehrwecker	25	"Denk an mich"	–	–	Team full	–
10	Etienne Wiebe	18	"Outnumbered"	–	✔	Team full	✔
11	June Chatrine Weber	38	"You Light Up My Life"	–	Team full	Team full	–
12	Jonnes Vennemann-Schmidt	27	"Schweigen ist Silber"	✔	Team full	Team full	–
13	Max Kropius	29	"Hold the Line"	Team full	Team full	Team full	✔

== Battle rounds ==
The battle rounds were recorded from September 11, 2020 to September 13, 2020 in Berlin and were broadcast from November 8, 2020 until November 22, 2020, being broadcast like the blind auditions every Thursday on ProSieben and every Sunday on Sat.1.

The coaches can steal two losing artist from other coaches.

Color key

Artist won the Battle and advanced to the Sing-offs
Artist lost the Battle but was stolen by another coach and advances to the Sing-offs
Artist lost the Battle but got a second chance to compete in "Comeback Stage"
Artist lost the Battle and was eliminated

Episode	Coach(es)	Order	Winner	Song	Loser	'Steal' result			
Episode	Coach(es)	Order	Winner	Song	Loser	Mark	Yvonne & Stefanie	Nico	Samu & Rea
Episode 10 (November 8)	Yvonne & Stefanie	1	Alessandro Pola	"My Love Is Your Love"	Hannah Wilhelm	✔	—N/a	✔	✔
Episode 10 (November 8)	Samu & Rea	2	Antonio Esposito	"Mein Block"	Alex Hartung	–	–	–	—N/a
Episode 10 (November 8)	Nico	3	Jonas & Mael	"Aïcha"	Mohammed Alsharif	–	–	—N/a	–
Episode 10 (November 8)	Mark	4	ONAIR	"Daft Punk"	Kim Unger	—N/a	–	–	–
Episode 10 (November 8)	Samu & Rea	5	Paula Dalla Corte	"Livin' on a Prayer"	Lisa-Marie Christ	–	–	–	—N/a
Episode 10 (November 8)	Mark	6	Jonnes Vennemann-Schmidt	"Zuhause"	Eugene Asira	—N/a	–	–	–
Episode 10 (November 8)	Nico	7	Pamela Falcon	"You're the Voice"	Andrew Reyes	–	✔	—N/a	✔
Episode 11 (November 12)	Yvonne & Stefanie	1	Manuel Suss	"Legendary"	Etienne Wiebe	–	—N/a	–	–
Episode 11 (November 12)	Nico	2	Max Lenz	"Breaking Me"	Sion Jung	✔	–	—N/a	–
Episode 11 (November 12)	Samu & Rea	3	Celine Hammerling	"Wake Me Up"	Julian Jas	–	–	–	—N/a
Episode 11 (November 12)	Mark	4	Jan-Luca Bina	"The Pretender"	Florian Ritzi	—N/a	–	–	–
Episode 11 (November 12)	Nico	5	Leon "Ezo" Weick	"110"	Isabel Nolte	–	✔	—N/a	–
Episode 11 (November 12)	Samu & Rea	6	Esther Nkongo	"Independent Women Part 1"	Danica Mae Miranda	–	–	–	—N/a
Episode 11 (November 12)	Yvonne & Stefanie	7	Dimi Rompos	"Mit dir"	Maciek	✔	—N/a	–	✔
Episode 12 (November 15)	Yvonne & Stefanie	1	Juan Geck	"Freedom"	Keye Katcher	Team full	—N/a	–	–
Episode 12 (November 15)	Mark	2	Finton Mumbure	"Message in a Bottle"	Marc Gensior	Team full	–	–	–
Episode 12 (November 15)	Samu & Rea	3	Lorena Daum	"Enjoy the Silence"	Oliver Henrich	Team full	✔	✔	—N/a
Episode 12 (November 15)	Nico	4	Nico Traut	"Cry Me a River"	Michelle Schulz	Team full	Team full	—N/a	–
Episode 12 (November 15)	Mark	5	Ninorta Coban	"Don't Start Now"	Erwin Holm	Team full	Team full	–	–
Episode 12 (November 15)	Samu & Rea	6	Wolfgang Herbst	"Cordula Grün"	Max Kropius	Team full	Team full	–	—N/a
Episode 12 (November 15)	Yvonne & Stefanie	7	Maria Nicolaides	"Hit the Road Jack"	Reginald Holden Jennings	Team full	Team full	–	–
Episode 13 (November 19)	Samu & Rea	1	Matthias Nebel	"Leave a Light On"	Katiuska McLean	Team full	Team full	–	—N/a
Episode 13 (November 19)	Yvonne & Stefanie	2	Max Glatzel	"There's Nothing Holdin' Me Back"	Gerald Oppong	Team full	Team full	–	–
Episode 13 (November 19)	Mark	3	Claire Litzler	"Euphoria"	Alessandro Rinella	Team full	Team full	–	–
Episode 13 (November 19)	Nico	4	Janina Beyerlein	"Kings & Queens"	Jana Glawischnig	Team full	Team full	—N/a	–
Episode 13 (November 19)	Samu & Rea	5	Douglas Adkins	"Ocean Eyes"	Claudia Pahl	Team full	Team full	–	—N/a
Episode 13 (November 19)	Nico	6	Simon Paterno	"Freedom! '90"	Kimia Scharlett Rotm	Team full	Team full	—N/a	–
Episode 13 (November 19)	Mark	7	Natalie Behnisch	"Rain on Me"	Targol Dalirazar	Team full	Team full	–	–
Episode 13 (November 19)	Yvonne & Stefanie	8	Noah Sam Honegger	"I See Fire"	Marvin Scondo	Team full	Team full	✔	–
Episode 14 (November 22)	Nico	1	BB Thomaz	"Dirrty"	Julia Köster	Team full	Team full	Team full	–
Episode 14 (November 22)	Yvonne & Stefanie	2	Leo Engels	"Havana"	Anastasia Blevins	Team full	Team full	Team full	✔
Episode 14 (November 22)	Mark	3	Alexandra Jörg	"Guten Tag"	Cathalin Kuhnhardt	Team full	Team full	Team full	Team full
Episode 14 (November 22)	Mark	4	Tosari Udayana	"Savage Love"	Michael Caliman	Team full	Team full	Team full	Team full
Episode 14 (November 22)	Yvonne & Stefanie	5	Vojtech Zakouril	"Bridge over Troubled Water"	George Philippart	Team full	Team full	Team full	Team full
Episode 14 (November 22)	Nico	6	Manuel Lojo	"La Cintura"	Emmanuel Sandoval Santillan	Team full	Team full	Team full	Team full
Episode 14 (November 22)	Samu & Rea	7	Sean Koch	"Jealous"	Duc-Nam Trinh	Team full	Team full	Team full	Team full

== Sing offs ==
The sing offs were recorded in Berlin from October 22, 2020 to October 23, 2020 and were broadcast from November 26, 2020 on ProSieben until December 6, 2020 on Sat.1. Coach Samu Haber was missing on the second day of the recordings, after he tested positive for the Coronavirus. This season's advisors were Joy Denalane for Team Mark, Clueso for Team Yvonne & Stefanie, Lea for Team Nico and David Guetta for Team Samu & Rea.

Color key

Artist was immediately eliminated after performance without given a chair
Artist was given a chair but swapped out later in the competition and eventually eliminated
Artist was given a chair and made the final two of their own team
Artist lost the Sing Off but got a second chance to compete in "Comeback Stage"

Episode	Coach(es)	Order	Artist	Song	Coach's decision	Switched with
Episode 15 (November 26)	Nico	1	Simon Paterno	"Signed, Sealed, Delivered I'm Yours"	Put in Hot-seat 1	
Episode 15 (November 26)	Nico	2	Hannah Wilhelm	"Pretty Hurts"	Put in Hot-seat 2	
Episode 15 (November 26)	Nico	3	Marvin Scondo	"What's Going On"	Put in Hot-seat 1	Simon Paterno
Episode 15 (November 26)	Nico	4	Nico Traut	"Fix You"	Put in Hot-seat 1	Marvin Scondo
Episode 15 (November 26)	Nico	5	Pamela Falcon	"Show Me Heaven"	Eliminated	–
Episode 15 (November 26)	Nico	6	Leon "Ezo" Weick	"So wie du bist"	Eliminated	–
Episode 15 (November 26)	Nico	7	Manuel Lojo	"Bamboléo"	Eliminated	–
Episode 15 (November 26)	Nico	8	Janina Beyerlein	"Diamonds"	Put in Hot-seat 2	Hannah Wilhelm
Episode 15 (November 26)	Nico	9	Jonas & Mael	"MMMBop"	Put in Hot-seat 2	Janina Beyerlein
Episode 15 (November 26)	Nico	10	Max Lenz	"This City"	Eliminated	–
Episode 15 (November 26)	Nico	11	BB Thomaz	"A Change Is Gonna Come"	Eliminated	–
Episode 15 (November 26)	Yvonne & Stefanie	1	Max Glatzel	"Eastside"	Put in Hot-seat 1	
Episode 15 (November 26)	Yvonne & Stefanie	2	Isabel Nolte	"Dein ist mein ganzes Herz"	Put in Hot-seat 2	
Episode 15 (November 26)	Yvonne & Stefanie	3	Manuel Suss	"Animals"	Put in Hot-seat 2	Isabel Nolte
Episode 15 (November 26)	Yvonne & Stefanie	4	Leo Engels	"Youth"	Eliminated	–
Episode 15 (November 26)	Yvonne & Stefanie	5	Maria Nicolaides	"You're Nobody 'til Somebody Loves You"	Put in Hot-seat 2	Manuel Suss
Episode 16 (November 29)	Yvonne & Stefanie	6	Oliver Henrich	"Warrior"	Put in Hot-seat 1	Max Glatzel
Episode 16 (November 29)	Yvonne & Stefanie	7	Dimi Rompos	"No Diggity"	Put in Hot-seat 1	Oliver Henrich
Episode 16 (November 29)	Yvonne & Stefanie	8	Alessandro Pola	"Hold Back the River"	Put in Hot-seat 1	Dimi Rompos
Episode 16 (November 29)	Yvonne & Stefanie	9	Vojtĕch Zakouřil	"Dusk Till Dawn"	Eliminated	–
Episode 16 (November 29)	Yvonne & Stefanie	10	Noah Sam Honegger	"Hurt"	Put in Hot-seat 2	Maria Nicolaides
Episode 16 (November 29)	Yvonne & Stefanie	11	Juan Geck	"Pray"	Put in Hot-seat 1	Alessandro Pola
Episode 16 (November 29)	Mark	1	Claire Litzler	"Fields of Gold"	Put in Hot-seat 1	
Episode 16 (November 29)	Mark	2	Sion Jung	"Better Now"	Put in Hot-seat 2	
Episode 16 (November 29)	Mark	3	Natalie Behnisch	"Turning Tables"	Eliminated	–
Episode 16 (November 29)	Mark	4	Jan-Luca Bina	"Mantra"	Put in Hot-seat 1	Claire Litzler
Episode 16 (November 29)	Mark	5	Jonnes Vennemann-Schmidt	"Auf anderen Wegen"	Eliminated	–
Episode 16 (November 29)	Mark	6	Ninorta Coban	"Candyman"	Put in Hot-seat 1	Jan-Luca Bina
Episode 16 (November 29)	Mark	7	Finton Mumbure	"Talkin' 'bout a Revolution"	Eliminated	–
Episode 16 (November 29)	Mark	8	Maciek	"Flugmodus"	Put in Hot-seat 1	Ninorta Coban
Episode 17 (December 6)	Mark	9	ONAIR	"Locked Out of Heaven"	Put in Hot-seat 1	Maciek
Episode 17 (December 6)	Mark	10	Alexandra Jörg	"Die Schöne und das Biest"	Eliminated	–
Episode 17 (December 6)	Mark	11	Tosari Udayana	"Intentions"	Put in Hot-seat 1	ONAIR
Episode 17 (December 6)	Samu & Rea	1	Anastasia Blevins	"Titanium"	Put in Hot-seat 1	
Episode 17 (December 6)	Samu & Rea	2	Lorena Daum	"Weak"	Put in Hot-seat 2	
Episode 17 (December 6)	Samu & Rea	3	Andrew Reyes	"Angels"	Put in Hot-seat 1	Anastasia Blevins
Episode 17 (December 6)	Samu & Rea	4	Celine Hammerling	"7 Rings"	Eliminated	–
Episode 17 (December 6)	Samu & Rea	5	Douglas Adkins	"Crazy Little Thing Called Love"	Eliminated	–
Episode 17 (December 6)	Samu & Rea	6	Paula Dalla Corte	"Bruises"	Put in Hot-seat 1	Andrew Reyes
Episode 17 (December 6)	Samu & Rea	7	Wolfgang Herbst	"Über sieben Brücken musst du gehn"	Eliminated	–
Episode 17 (December 6)	Samu & Rea	8	Sean Koch	"God Only Knows"	Put in Hot-seat 2	Lorena Daum
Episode 17 (December 6)	Samu & Rea	9	Antonio Esposito	"AMG"	Eliminated	–
Episode 17 (December 6)	Samu & Rea	10	Esther Nkongo	"Holding Back the Years"	Put in Hot-seat 2	Sean Koch
Episode 17 (December 6)	Samu & Rea	11	Matthias Nebel	"I Don't Want to Miss a Thing"	Put in Hot-seat 2	Esther Nkongo

== Comeback Stage ==
This season's fifth coach, Michael Schulte, mentored selected artists who did not make a team during the Blind Auditions as well as eliminated artists from later rounds of the competition, thus creating new rounds to The Voice: Comeback Stage by SEAT that was exclusive to thevoiceofgermany.de. The two winners competed in the Live Shows against the talents of the coaches Mark Forster, Yvonne Catterfeld & Stefanie Kloss, Nico Santos and Samu Haber & Rea Garvey live on television for a chance to win the tenth season of The Voice of Germany.

=== First round ===
During the first round of competition, the eight selected artists from Blind Auditions went head to head, two artists per episode, and Schulte selected a winner to move on to the next round.

Artist won the battle and advanced to the next round
Artist lost the battle and was eliminated

Episode	Coach	Order	Artist	Song	Result
Episode 1 & 2 (October 8 & 11)	Michael	1	Mickela Löffel	"Für Immer"	Advanced
Episode 1 & 2 (October 8 & 11)	Michael	2	Karin Hagendorfer	"Roxanne"	Eliminated
Episode 3 (October 18)	Michael	1	Richie Gooding	"Stargazing"	Eliminated
Episode 3 (October 18)	Michael	2	Jay Gomes	"Havana"	Advanced
Episode 4 (October 25)	Michael	1	Aisha Diabaté	"Je ne parle pas français"	Eliminated
Episode 4 (October 25)	Michael	2	Mark Ledlin	"Fast Car"	Advanced
Episode 5 (November 1)	Michael	1	Alexander Seeger	"Say Something"	Advanced
Episode 5 (November 1)	Michael	2	Christian Reisinger	"Stay with Me"	Eliminated

=== Second round ===
In the second round, the four remaining artists chose another song to sing, with two of them advancing to the next round.

Artist won the battle and advanced to the next round
Artist lost the battle and was eliminated

Episode	Coach	Order	Artist	Song	Result
Episode 6 (November 8)	Michael	1	Mark Ledlin	"Roundabouts"	Eliminated
Episode 6 (November 8)	Michael	2	Mickela Löffel	"Symphonie"	Advanced
Episode 6 (November 8)	Michael	3	Jay Gomes	"194 Länder"	Eliminated
Episode 6 (November 8)	Michael	4	Alexander Seeger	"Home"	Advanced

=== Third round ===
In the third round, Schulte brought back two artists who were eliminated during the Battle rounds, giving them a chance to re-enter in the competition. These artists faced off against the two artists from the second round.

Artist won the battle and advanced to the final round
Artist lost the battle and was eliminated

Episode	Coach	Order	Artist	Song	Result
Episode 7 (November 15)	Michael	1	Keye Katcher	"River"	Advanced
Episode 7 (November 15)	Michael	2	Alexander Seeger	"Power Over Me"	Eliminated
Episode 8 (November 22)	Michael	1	Mickela Löffel	"Schön genug"	Advanced
Episode 8 (November 22)	Michael	2	Claudia Pahl	"Imagine"	Eliminated

=== Final round ===
In the final round, the two winners of the third round competed against two eliminated artists from the Sing Offs. From these four artists, two advanced in the Live Shows.

Artist won The Comeback Stage and advanced to the Live Shows
Artist lost the battle and was eliminated

Episode	Coach	Order	Artist	Song	Result
Episode 9 (November 29)	Michael	1	Alessandro Pola	"Crazy"	Advanced
Episode 9 (November 29)	Michael	2	Keye Katcher	"Who You Are"	Eliminated
Episode 10 (December 6)	Michael	1	Mickela Löffel	"Zu dir"	Advanced
Episode 10 (December 6)	Michael	2	Max Lenz	"Falling Like the Stars"	Eliminated

== Live shows ==
The live shows began on December 13, 2020 on Sat.1. Each coach has in his/her team 2 artists. For the first time in the German version, viewers can vote for their favorites artists via online voting on thevoice.de. There is still the possibility of telephone and SMS voting.

=== Week 1: Semifinal (December 13) ===
The semi-final was aired on December 13, 2020, with two acts from each team performing. The public chose one artist from each team to advance to the final. On December 8, 2020, it was announced that Noah Sam Honegger will not be participating in the live shows for health reasons and will be replaced by Oliver Henrich.

Color key

Artist was saved by the public's votes
Artist was eliminated

Order	Coach(es)	Artist	Song	Voting	Result
1	Nico	Jonas & Mael	"Shut Up and Dance"	50.9%	Advanced
2	Nico	Nico Traut	"XO"	49.1%	Eliminated
3	Yvonne & Stefanie	Oliver Henrich	"Before You Go"	57.3%	Advanced
4	Yvonne & Stefanie	Juan Geck	"Nobody's Perfect"	42.7%	Eliminated
5	Michael	Alessandro Pola	"Drops of Jupiter"	71.2%	Advanced
6	Michael	Mickela Löffel	"Eiserner Steg"	28.8%	Eliminated
7	Mark	Sion Jung	"Mood"	44.4%	Eliminated
8	Mark	Tosari Udayana	"It's Gonna Be Me"	55.6%	Advanced
9	Samu & Rea	Paula Dalla Corte	"Another Love"	60.0%	Advanced
10	Samu & Rea	Matthias Nebel	"Heaven"	40.0%	Eliminated

=== Week 2: Final (December 20) ===
The final aired on December 20, 2020. In the final week, the five finalists performed a solo cover song, an original duet song with their coach and a duet with a special guest.

Coach(es)	Artist	Order	Solo Song	Order	Original Song (feat. coach)	Order	Duet Song (with special guest)	Voting	Result
Yvonne Catterfeld & Stefanie Kloß	Oliver Henrich	1	"Beautiful Day"	12	"If It Wasn't You"	9	"Control" (with Zoe Wees)	18.06%	Runner-up
Mark Forster	Tosari Udayana	6	"Halo"	10	"Right Here"	2	"Someday At Christmas" (with Joy Denalane)	6.52%	Fifth Place
Nico Santos	Jonas & Mael	13	"All I Want for Christmas Is You"	8	"Treat You Right"	3	"Beautiful Madness" (with Michael Patrick Kelly)	17.71%	Third Place
Samu Haber & Rea Garvey	Paula Dalla Corte	4	"Strong"	15	"Someone Better"	7	"Bye Bye" (with Sarah Connor)	43.79%	Winner
Michael Schulte	Alessandro Pola	14	"Dancing on My Own"	5	"Don't You Worry"	11	"Arcade" (with Duncan Laurence)	13.92%	Fourth Place

== Elimination chart ==
Coaches color key

- Artist from Team Mark
- Artist from Team Yvonne & Stefanie
- Artist from Team Nico
- Artist from Team Samu & Rea
- Artist from Team Michael (Comeback Stage)

Results color key

- Winner
- Runner-up
- Third place
- Fourth place
- Fifth Place
- Artist was saved by the public vote
- Artist was eliminated

=== Overall ===
Live show results per week
Artist	Week 1 Semifinal	Week 2 Final
Paula Dalla Corte	Safe	Winner
Oliver Henrich	Safe	Runner-up
Jonas & Mael	Safe	3rd Place
Alessandro Pola	Safe	4th Place
Tosari Udayana	Safe	5th Place
Matthias Nebel	Eliminated	Eliminated (Semifinal)
Sion Jung	Eliminated	Eliminated (Semifinal)
Mickela Löffel	Eliminated	Eliminated (Semifinal)
Juan Geck	Eliminated	Eliminated (Semifinal)
Nico Traut	Eliminated	Eliminated (Semifinal)

=== Team ===
Live shows results per team
Artist	Week 1 Semifinal	Week 2 Final
Tosari Udayana	Advanced	Fifth place
Sion Jung	Eliminated	
Oliver Henrich	Advanced	Runner-up
Juan Geck	Eliminated	
Jonas & Mael	Advanced	Third place
Nico Traut	Eliminated	
Paula Dalla Corte	Advanced	Winner
Matthias Nebel	Eliminated	
Alessandro Pola	Advanced	Fourth place
Mickela Löffel	Eliminated	

== Contestants who appeared on previous season ==
- George Philippart was already part of The Voice of Germany in the fifth season. As Sabrina, he made it into the battles on Rea Garvey's team.
- Michelle Schulz was in the sixth season, however she did not earn a chair turn in the blind auditions.
- Gregory Krause was in the first season of The Voice Kids, where he was in team Tim Bendzko and he was eliminated in the battle rounds.
- Isabel Nolte was in the fourth season of The Voice of Holland, where she was in team Ilse DeLange and she was eliminated in the battle rounds.
- Claire Litzler was in the eighth season of The Voice: La plus belle voix , where she was in team Julien Clerc and she was eliminated in the K.O. rounds.

=== Allstar ===
- Pamela Falcon competed on the show's first season as part of Rea Garvey's team and was eliminated in the battle rounds.
- Matthias Nebel competed on the eighth season as part of Michael Patrick Kelly's team and was eliminated in the semi-final.
- Juan Geck competed on the seventh season as part of Yvonne Catterfeld's team and was eliminated in the sing offs.
- Janina Beyerlein competed on the seventh season as part of Samu Haber's team and was eliminated in the semi-final.
- Dimi Rompos auditioned for season two, but did not get a chair turn. She later auditioned again on the fifth season, where she was eliminated in the Semi-final on Stefanie Kloß's team.
- Alex Hartung competed on the fourth season as part of Michi Beck & Smudo's team and later Garvey's team, ultimately eliminated in the first live show.
- Maciek competed on the ninth season as part of Mark Forster's team and was eliminated in the sing offs.
- Keye Katcher competed on the second season as part of The BossHoss's team and was eliminated in the Semi-final.
- Michael Caliman competed on the sixth season as part of Andreas Bourani's team and was eliminated in the Semi-final.
- BB Thomaz was Yvonne Catterfeld's finalist on the seventh season, where she finished in fourth place.

== Ratings ==
Timeslot are CEST (UTC+2) for episodes 1 to 5 and CET (UTC+1) for episodes 6 to 19.

Episode		Date	Timeslot	Channel	Viewers (in millions)		Share (in %)		Source
Episode		Date	Timeslot	Channel	Total	14 - 49 Years	Total	14 - 49 Years	Source
1	"Blind Auditions"	October 8, 2020	Thursday 8:15 pm	ProSieben	3.19	1.47	11.4	18.8	
2	"Blind Auditions"	October 11, 2020	Sunday 8:15 pm	Sat.1	3.05	1.33	10.0	14.5	
3	"Blind Auditions"	October 15, 2020	Thursday 8:15 pm	ProSieben	3.08	1.46	10.5	17.7	
4	"Blind Auditions"	October 18, 2020	Sunday 8:15 pm	Sat.1	2.95	1.35	9.5	14.4	
5	"Blind Auditions"	October 22, 2020	Thursday 8:15 pm	ProSieben	3.25	1.51	11.3	18.6	
6	"Blind Auditions"	October 25, 2020	Sunday 8:15 pm	Sat.1	2.81	1.30	9.0	13.6	
7	"Blind Auditions"	October 29, 2020	Thursday 8:15 pm	ProSieben	3.29	1.71	11.2	20.4	
8	"Blind Auditions"	November 1, 2020	Sunday 8:15 pm	Sat.1	2.54	1.13	7.9	11.6	
9	"Blind Auditions"	November 5, 2020	Thursday 8:15 pm	ProSieben	2.97	1.47	9.6	16.5	
10	"Battle Rounds"	November 8, 2020	Sunday 8:15 pm	Sat.1	2.56	1.28	8.0	13.1	
11	"Battle Rounds"	November 12, 2020	Thursday 8:15 pm	ProSieben	2.64	1.31	9.1	15.9	
12	"Battle Rounds"	November 15, 2020	Sunday 8:15 pm	Sat.1	2.60	1.34	7.8	12.8	
13	"Battle Rounds"	November 19, 2020	Thursday 8:15 pm	ProSieben	2.42	1.26	8.3	15.1	
14	"Battle Rounds"	November 22, 2020	Sunday 8:15 pm	Sat.1	2.60	1.28	8.2	13.3	
15	"Sing Offs"	November 26, 2020	Thursday 8:15 pm	ProSieben	2.15	1.07	7.7	13.8	
16	"Sing Offs"	November 29, 2020	Sunday 8:15 pm	Sat.1	2.27	1.08	7.5	15.3	
17	"Sing Offs"	December 6, 2020	Sunday 8:15 pm	Sat.1	1.93	0.98	6.4	10.8	
18	"Live Shows"	December 13, 2020	Sunday 8:15 pm	Sat.1	1.91	0.90	6.1	9.3	
19	"Live Shows"	December 20, 2020	Sunday 8:15 pm	Sat.1	2.50	1.18	9.2	14.6	
