= Natia Todua =

Georgian-German singer (born 1996)

- Born: 12 March 1996 (age 30); Tbilisi, Georgia
- Genres: Pop; soul
- Occupation: Singer
- Instrument: Vocals
- Years active: 2014–present
- Label: UMG

Natia Todua (Georgian: ნათია თოდუა; born 12 March 1996) is a Georgian-German singer. She came to prominence in Germany after winning the seventh season of The Voice of Germany. In 2018, Todua became a judge on the Georgian version of Idol.

== Life and career ==
=== 2014–2016: Early life and Georgian career ===
Todua was born in Tbilisi on 12 March 1996 to parents who fled Abkhazia during the War in Abkhazia of the early-1990s. When she was two years old, her family returned to Abkhazia and settled in Gali District. After completing school, she and her sister returned to Tbilisi, where Todua studied economics at Caucasus University. She went on to take part in X Factor Georgia in 2014 and X-Factor Ukraine in 2015, but did not achieve success in the competitions.

=== 2017–present: The Voice of Germany and Unser Lied für Lissabon ===
In 2016, Todua moved to Germany where she began working as an au pair, living in Bruchsal. The following year, she auditioned for the seventh season of The Voice of Germany, and joined the team of Samu Haber. Todua progressed through the competition, and ultimately was chosen as the winner by the German public on 17 December 2017. Following her win, she was signed to Universal Music Group. On 29 December 2017, Todua was confirmed as a contestant in Unser Lied für Lissabon, the German national selection for the Eurovision Song Contest 2018. Her entry "My Own Way" was released on 20 February 2018, which went on to place last in the competition.

In 2018, Todua became a judge on the Georgian version of Idol.

== Discography ==
=== Singles ===
Title	Year	Peak chart positions	Certifications	Album
Title	Year	GER	Certifications	Album
"My Own Way"	2018	—		Non-album single

Awards and achievements
Preceded by Tay Schmedtmann	The Voice of Germany; Winner; 2017	Succeeded by Samuel Rösch
