= Paula Dalla Corte =

Swiss singer

- Born: Paula Dalla Corte; 21 May 2001 (age 25)
- Genre: Pop
- Occupation: Singer
- Instrument: Vocals
- Years active: 2020–present
- Label: Universal Music Group

Paula Dalla Corte (born May, 2001 in Tägerwilen) is a Swiss singer. She is known for winning the tenth season of The Voice of Germany broadcast by the German television channels ProSieben and Sat.1 in 2020.

== Life and career ==
=== Performances on The Voice of Germany 2020 ===
Theme	Song	Original Singer	result
The Blind Auditions	"Roar"	Katy Perry	Four chairs turned Joined Team Samu Haber & Rea Garvey
The Battle	"Livin' on a Prayer" vs Lisa-Marie Christ	Bon Jovi	Saved by Coach
Sing-Offs	"Bruises"	Lewis Capaldi	Saved by Coach
Semi-Finals	"Another Love"	Tom Odell	Saved by Public Vote
Final	"Bye Bye" ft Sarah Connor	Sarah Connor	Winner
Final	"Strong"	London Grammar	Winner
Final	"Someone Better" ft Samu Haber & Rea Garvey	Paula Dalla Corte	Winner

Voting Result Paula on The Voice of Germany
Theme	Percentage of Paula Voting	Rival	Percentage of Rival Voting	Result
Semi Final	60.0% (Advanced)	Matthias Nebel (Team Samu & Rea)	40.0% (Eliminated)	Paula advanced to Final
Final	43.79% (Winner)	Oliver Henrich (Team Stefanie & Yyvonne)	18.06% (Runner-up)	Winner
Final	43.79% (Winner)	Mael & Jonas (Team Nico)	17.71% (3rd Place)	Winner
Final	43.79% (Winner)	Alessandro Pola (Team Michael)	13.92% (4th Place)	Winner
Final	43.79% (Winner)	Tosari Udayana (Team Mark)	6.52% (5th Place)	Winner

=== After The Voice of Germany ===
On 4 August 2023, three years after her original Voice performance, she released her second single titled "Good Girl Killer".
She is currently signed under the label Universal Music.

== Discography ==
=== Singles ===
List of singles, with selected chart positions
Title	Year	Peak chart positions	Album
Title	Year	GER	Album
"Someone Better"	2020	—	Non-album single
"Good Girl Killer"	2023	—	Non-album single
"Bite Me"	2024	—	Non-album single

Awards and achievements
Preceded by Claudia Emmanuela Santoso	The Voice of Germany; Winner; 2020	Succeeded by Sebastian Krenz
