= Tay Schmedtmann =

German singer

- Born: 25 October 1996 (age 29); Brockhagen, North Rhine-Westphalia, Germany
- Genres: Pop; soul
- Occupation: Singer
- Instrument: Vocals
- Years active: 2016–present
- Label: UMG

Tay Schmedtmann (born 25 October 1996) is a German singer. He appeared on and won the sixth season of The Voice of Germany.

Awards and achievements
Preceded by Jamie-Lee Kriewitz	The Voice of Germany; Winner; 2016	Succeeded by Natia Todua
