= Doug Adkins =

Americana and country music musician and songwriter

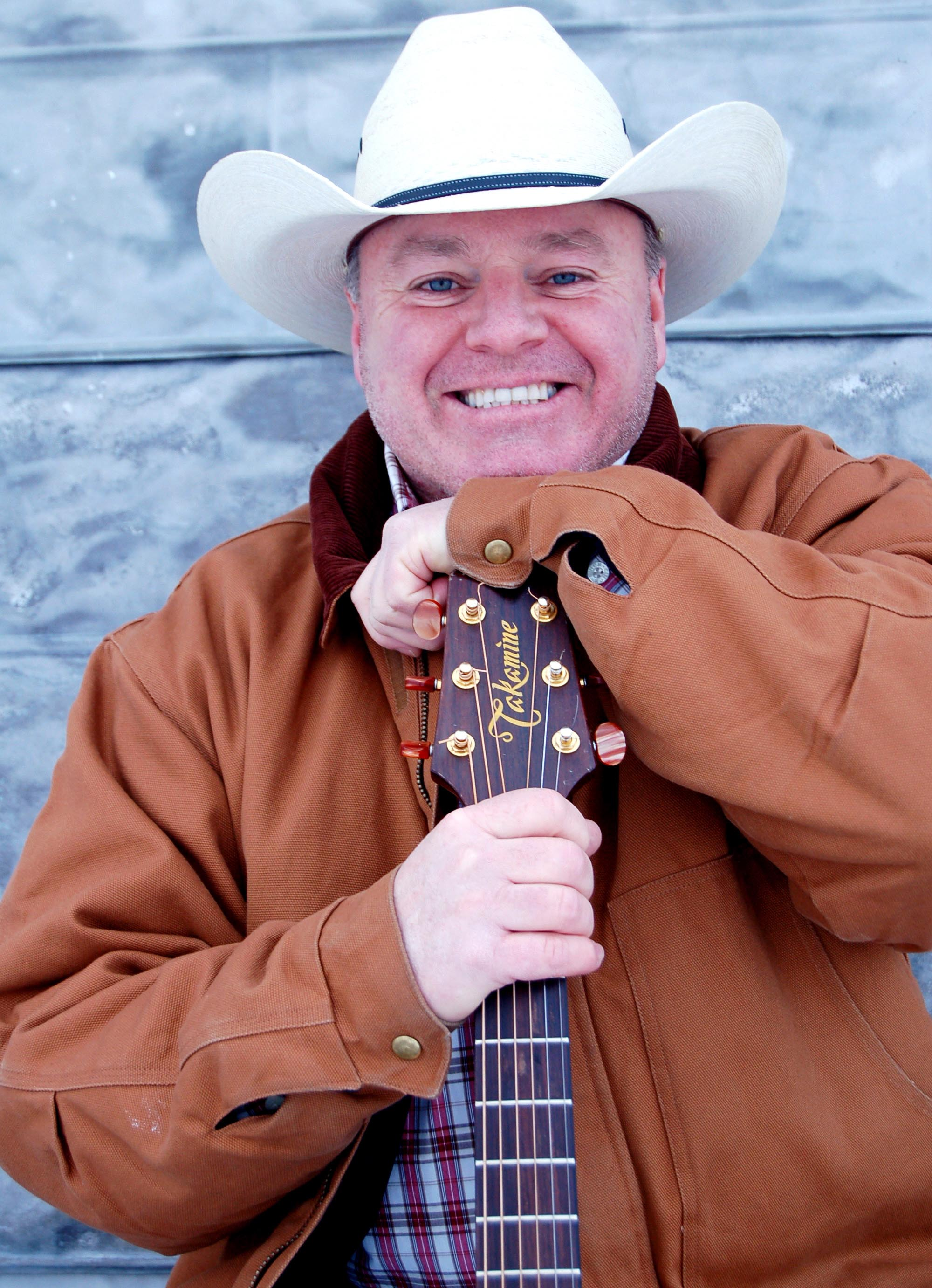

Background information
- Born: Douglas Martin Adkins; October 3, 1963 (age 62)
- Origin: Havre, Montana, United States
- Genres: Country and Americana
- Occupations: Recording artist, touring artist, singer, songwriter
- Instruments: Vocals, guitar
- Years active: 1991–present
- Label: Independent
- Website: www.dougadkins.com

Douglas Martin Adkins (born October 3, 1963) is an Americana and country musician and songwriter who grew up in Montana, United States. Adkins has released 12 studio albums and has toured extensively in Europe and the United States. His 2026 album, Don't Question Love, consists of original material and was described by Country.de as featuring some of his strongest compositions and productions.

In 2020 Adkins chose Samu Haber and Rea Garvey, the coaches from Team Samu Rea for the anniversary of The Voice of Germany (season 10). For the blind audition, Adkins sang the classic country hit "Achy Breaky Heart" by Billy Ray Cyrus. Coach Mark Forster also turned around for Adkins, but in the end Adkins chose Haber and Garvey due to the country music elements they have in their songwriting.

In the Battles, Adkins sang against newcomer Claudia Pahl from Tirol, Austria. Together they performed the Billie Eilish hit "Ocean Eyes". The duet performed the song in a country music style, which garnered worldwide attention and hundreds of thousands of views on The Voice of Germany website. It received acclaim for its originality and daring approach.

Between 1990 and 2026, Adkins released 12 studio albums. In 2005, he began recording in Nashville with producer and bass player Mike Chapman, one of Garth Brooks' longtime studio musicians known collectively as the "G-Men". The sessions for Whiskey Salesman included Brent Mason and J.T. Corenflos on guitars, Paul Franklin and Bruce Bouton on steel guitar, lap steel and dobro, and Lonnie Wilson on drums.

Following Whiskey Salesman, Adkins continued returning to Nashville to record with leading session musicians. Over the course of several albums, his recordings have featured Brent Mason and Lonnie Wilson, along with musicians including Jimmy Baker, Mike Severs and Scotty Sanders. These later Nashville recordings include Waltz Across Montana, Lonesome, Dirt Roads and Fence Lines, A Cowboys' Life, and Don't Question Love.

The first track released from the CD Whiskey Salesman stayed at the #1 position on the European Hotdisc Top 40 Country Charts for the weeks of 23 February and 2 March 2006. "Whiskey Salesman" was nominated for "Best Country Song of the Year" in 2008 by the Independent Music Awards. The second song released off the Whiskey Salesman CD was "Window Shoppin", which reached the #12 position on the European Hotdisc Top 40 Country Charts.

== Life and career ==
Adkins was born in Havre, Montana, the son of Marilyn and Jack Adkins. His father was an educator and basketball coach in Northeast Montana. Growing up in Montana, Adkins lived in Westby, Culbertson, and Froid, and graduated from high school in Sidney, Montana in 1982. He grew up singing with his sisters Jaclyn, Betty Jo, Theresa and Joan.

Adkins played basketball and golf in high school. He also played the trombone and, for four consecutive years, received a #1 rating at the state level for solo performance.

Adkins has continued touring in Germany and elsewhere in Europe, including appearances at country music events and venues throughout the 2020s.

In 2025, Adkins joined the jury of the Pullman City Country Music Award. He continued in the jury for the 2026 competition.

In 2026, Adkins released his 12th studio album, Don't Question Love. The album consists of original material and includes the songs "Left Hand Right", "If You Will", "Dinner for One", "Feel the Same", "I Don't Drink Alone", "The Old Cowboy in Me", "Saints and Sinners", and "Free". "Free", originally written by Adkins in 1990, was re-recorded for the project in connection with the 250th anniversary of the United States in 2026.

== Songwriter ==
As a songwriter, Adkins has written more than 200 original country songs over the course of his career. His songwriting frequently draws on his upbringing in Montana, small-town life, relationships, family, and experiences from more than two decades of touring in Europe and the United States.

Adkins recorded the Whiskey Salesman sessions in Nashville with producer Mike Chapman. "Whiskey Salesman" became one of Adkins' most successful songs, reaching number one on the European Hotdisc Country Chart and later receiving recognition from the Independent Music Awards. The same recording sessions produced "Window Shoppin'", which also charted in Europe.

Adkins has toured extensively in Europe and the U.S. Midwest since 2000, with regular European tours including Switzerland, France, Austria, Belgium, Germany, Poland, Italy, Latvia, Lithuania, Spain, the Netherlands, Denmark, Sweden, and Norway, along with shows across the United States.

In a 2026 review of Don't Question Love, Oasis Entertainment Blog wrote, "Doug Adkins isn't trying to reinvent country music — he's reinforcing why it resonates."

== Awards and recognition ==
In a 2026 review of Don't Question Love, Oasis Entertainment Blog wrote, "Doug Adkins isn't trying to reinvent country music — he's reinforcing why it resonates."

- 23 February 2006 - Song "Whiskey Salesman" reached #1 on the European Country Hotdisc Charts and stayed at the #1 position for four consecutive weeks.
- 22 June 2006 - Song "Window Shoppin'" reached #12 on the European Country Hotdisc Charts.
- 2008 - "Whiskey Salesman" was nominated in the Country Song category at the 8th Annual Independent Music Awards.
- 3 October 2010 - "Song Yippee ii Yippee aa'" reached #14 on the European Country Hotdisc Top 40 Charts.
- 28 November 2010- Song "Ain't Gonna Play With Your Heart" reached #14, spending 3 months from November 10, 2010 to January 30, 2011 on the European Country Hotdisc Top 40 Charts.
- 3 April 2011 - Song "Loved You More'" reached #11 on the European Country Hotdisc Top 40 Charts.
- 14 September 2014 - Song "Pretty Girls", recorded by Adkins and Barry P. Foley, reaches #2 on the European Country Hotdisc Top 40 Charts.
- 1 August 2020 - Selected Samu Haber and Rea Garvey from Team Samu Rea for the anniversary of The Voice of Germany (season 10).
- 1 October 2020 - Adkins sang the classic country hit "Achy Breaky Heart" by Billy Ray Cyrus.
- 1 November 2020 - In the Battles for The Voice of Germany Adkins and Claudia Pahl performed the Billie Eilish hit "Ocean Eyes".
- 2026 - Adkins was selected as a jury member for the Pullman City Country Music Award.

== Discography ==
=== Albums ===
- 1990 – Just Livin'
- 1993 – Habits and Hearts
- 1995 – Cowboy Comes Alive
- 1998 – Time Keeps Movin On
- 2002 – A Losin' Soul
- 2005 – Whiskey Salesman
- 2007 – One More Mile To Go
- 2010 – Waltz Across Montana
- 2016 – Lonesome
- 2018 – Dirt Roads and Fence Lines
- 2022 – A Cowboys' Life
- 2026 – Don't Question Love
