= The Voice of Germany season 7 =

The Voice of Germany
- Season 7
- Promotional poster featuring coaches Forster, Michi & Smudo, Catterfeld, and Haber
- Hosted by: Thore Schölermann; Lena Gercke
- Judges: Samu Haber; Yvonne Catterfeld; Michi Beck & Smudo; Mark Forster
- Winner: Natia Todua
- Winning coach: Samu Haber
- Runner-up: Benedikt Köstler

Release
- Original network: ProSieben and Sat.1
- Original release: October 19 – December 17, 2017

Season chronology
- ← Previous; Season 6 Next → Season 8

The Voice of Germany is a German reality talent show to find new singing talent. The seventh season premiered on October 19, 2017 on ProSieben and Sat.1. Based on the reality singing competition The Voice of Holland, the series was created by Dutch television producer John de Mol. It is part of an international series. Haber, Catterfeld and Michi & Smudo as coaches of the previous season would return, while Mark Forster joined as a new coach on the show, replacing Andreas Bourani. Schölermann and Gercke as hosts of the previous season would return.

Natia Todua was announced as the winner of The Voice of Germany, marking Samu Haber's first win as a coach.

== Coaches and Hosts ==
It was announced that Andreas Bourani would not be returning as a coach. Mark Forster was announced to take his place, following his success on The Voice Kids. Samu Haber, Yvonne Catterfield and Michi & Smudo all returned as coaches.

The Voice of Germany season 7 coaches

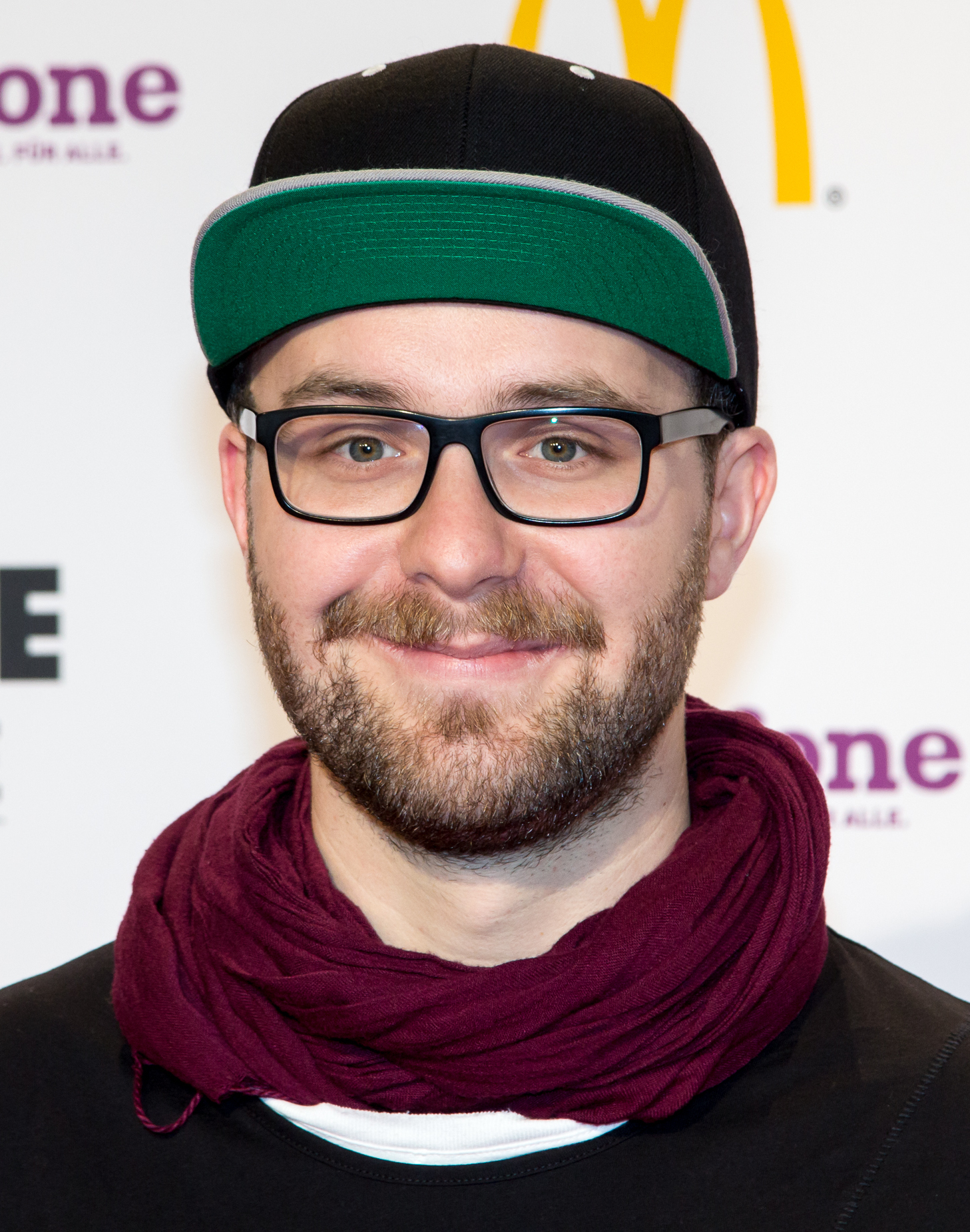
Mark Forster

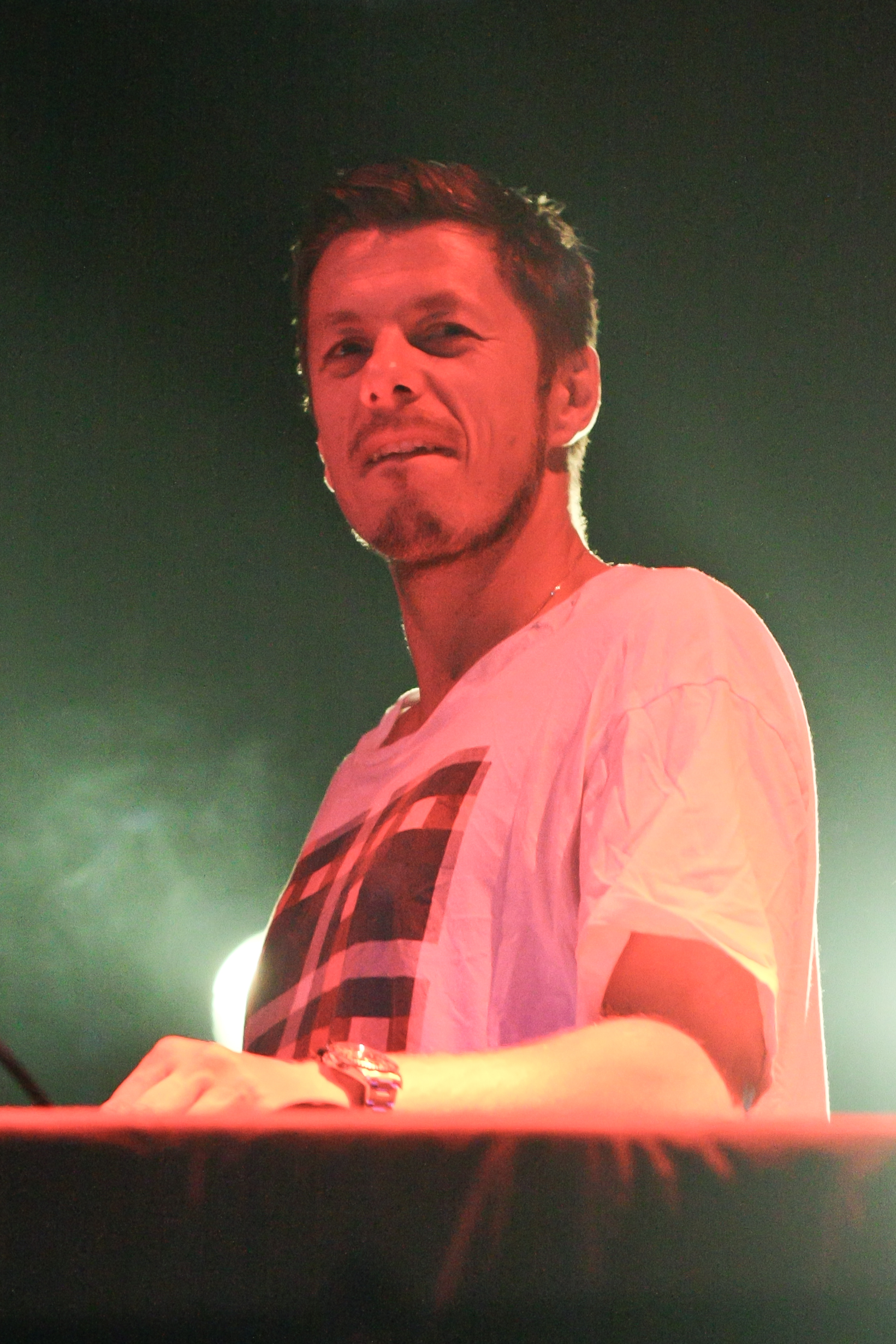
Michi

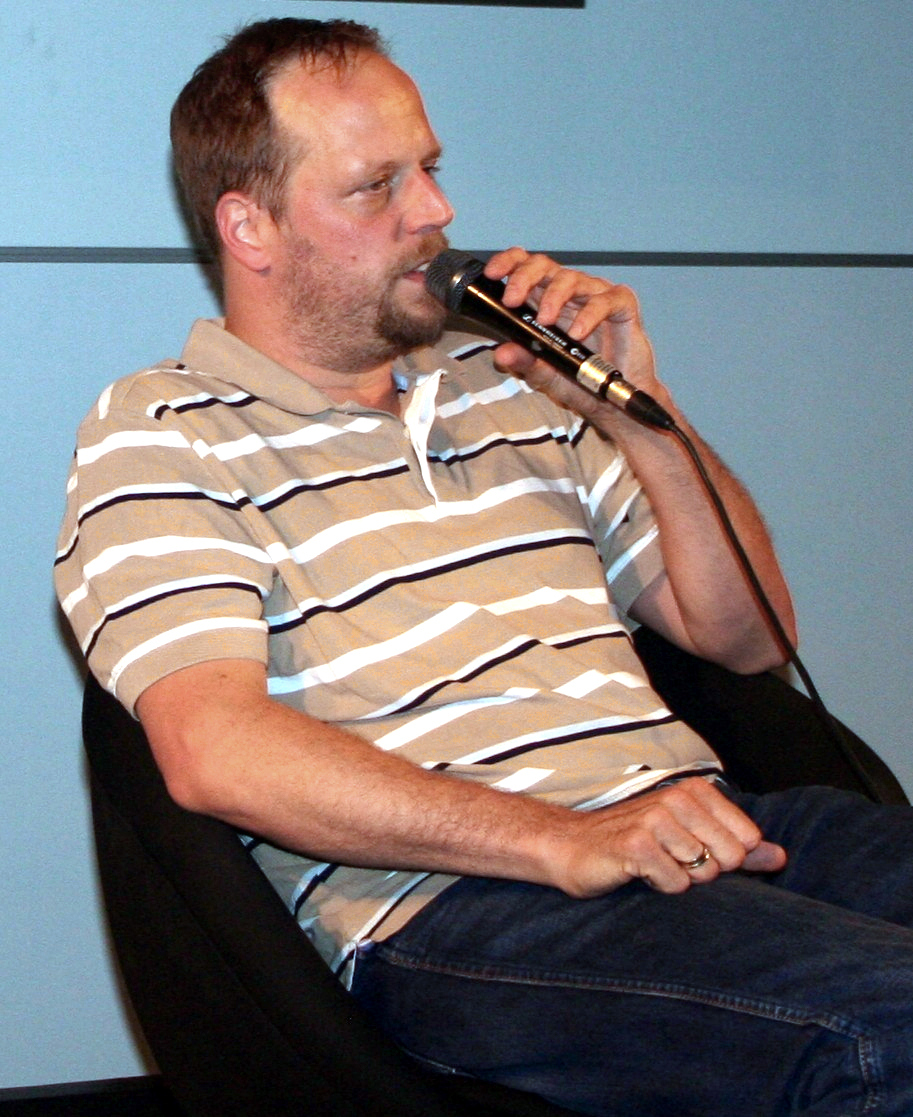
Smudo

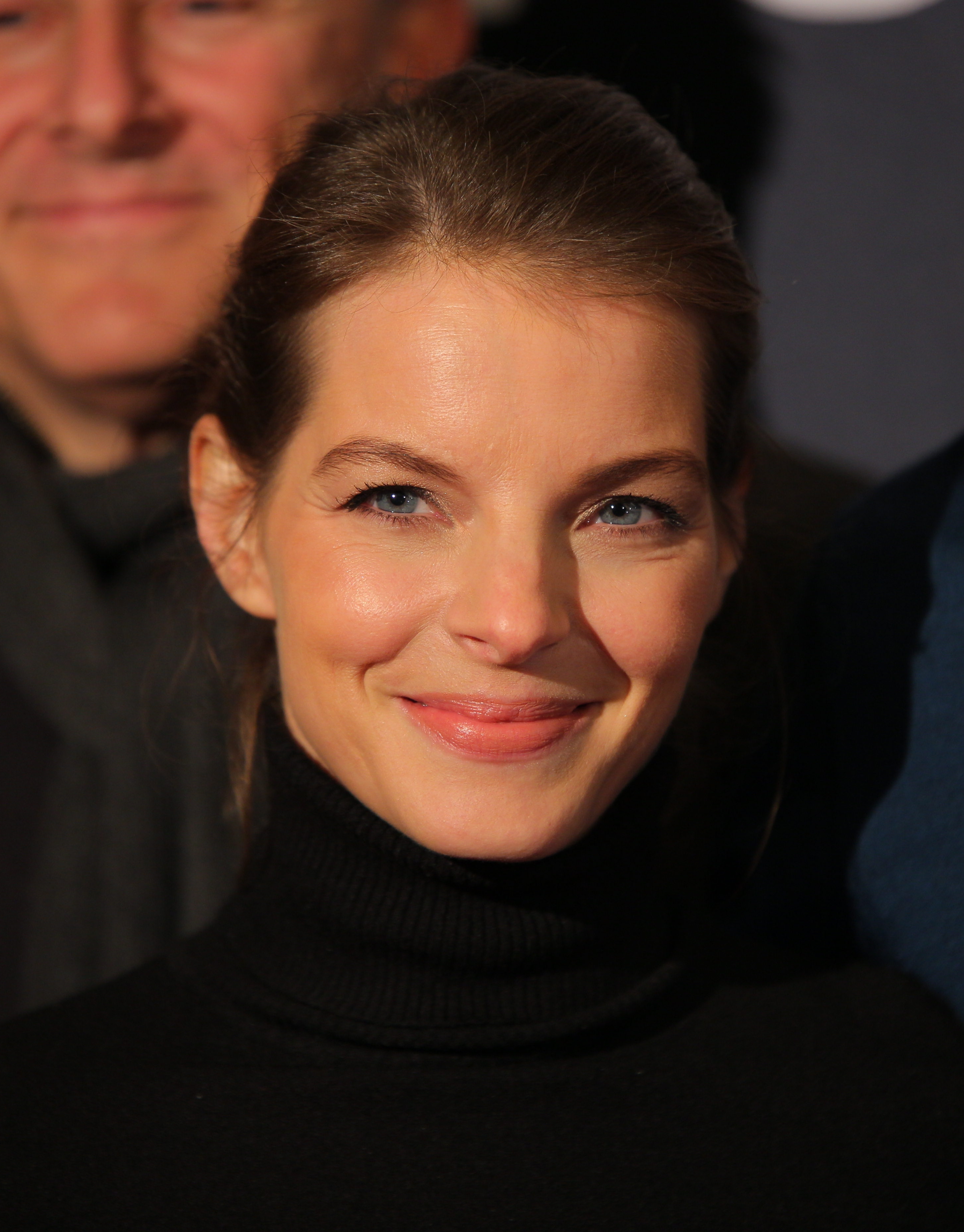
Yvonne Catterfeld

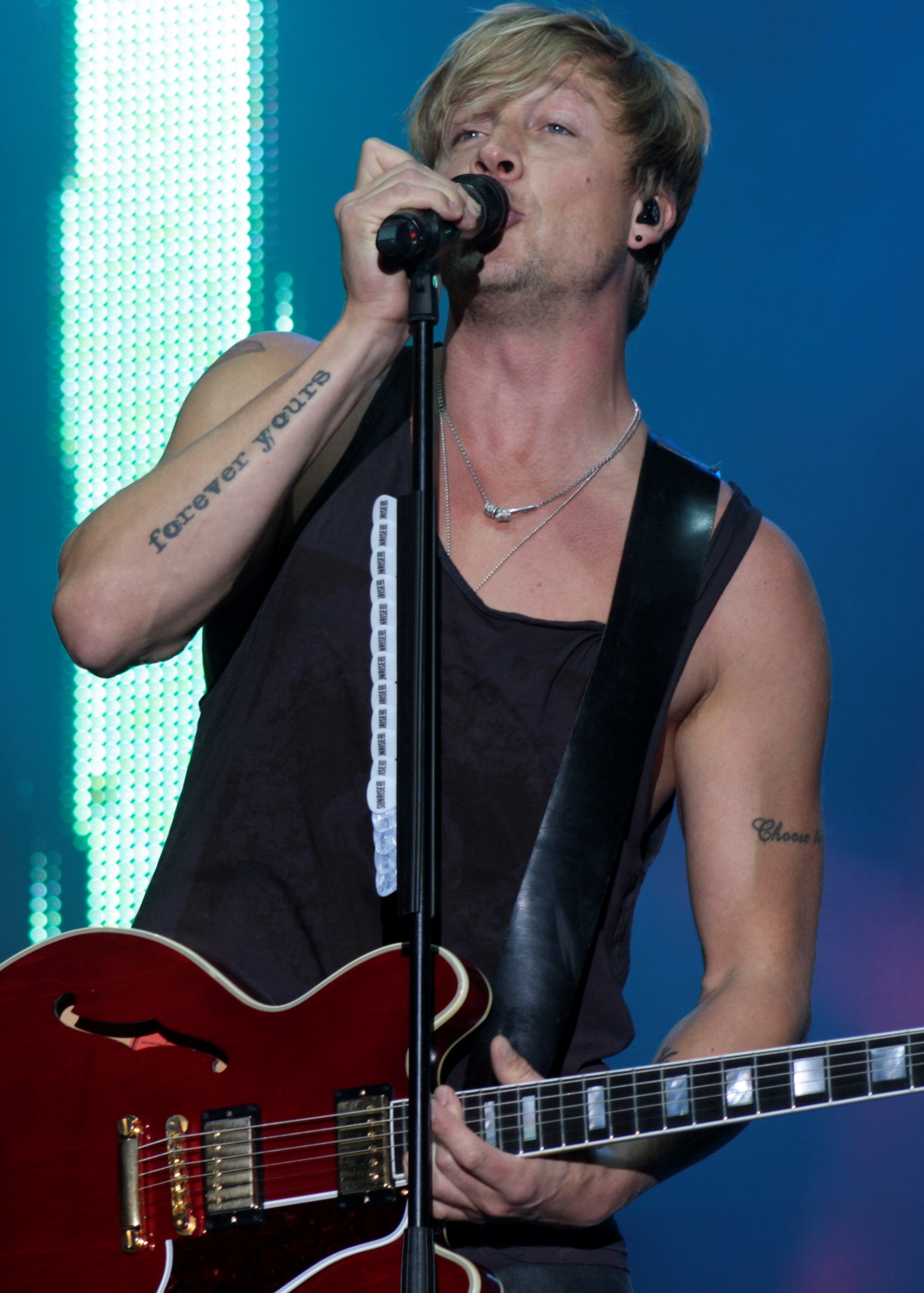
Samu Haber

== Teams ==
Colour key:

- Winner
- Runner-up
- Third place
- Fourth place
- Eliminated in the Semi-final
- Eliminated in the Sing Off
- Artist was stolen by another coach at the Battles
- Eliminated in the Battles

Coach	Top 77 Artists				
Mark Forster					
Mark Forster	Benedikt Köstler	Michael Russ	Filiz Arslan	Dajana Günther	Amin Afify
Mark Forster	Marie-Claude Rubin	Robin Portmann	Alexandra Sutter	Katy Winter	Luana Eschment
Mark Forster	Silke und Alexander Mohnfeld	Tasha Gonser	Jan Hasanov	Simon Zawila	Pishtar Dakaj
Mark Forster	Michel Oehrlein	Maria Giuseppina Cammisa	Miguel Fialho	Jonas Oberstaller	Felix Harer
Michi Beck & Smudo					
Michi Beck & Smudo	Anna Heimrath	Meike Hammerschmidt	Dzenan Buldic	Jade Pearl Baker	Luzie Juckenburg
Michi Beck & Smudo	Semion Bazavlouk	Stefanie Nerpel	Philip Piller	Melisa Toprakci	Kim Friehs
Michi Beck & Smudo	~~Christine Heitz~~	~~Doris Mete~~	Benjamin Hartmann	Barbara Padron Hernandez	Friederike Bayer
Michi Beck & Smudo	Isabell Jasmin Plaue	Helen Leahey	Mark Schlumberger	Patrick Strobel	Max Christoph Niemeyer
Yvonne Catterfeld					
Yvonne Catterfeld	BB Thomaz	Gregor Hägele	Melvin Vardouniotis	Johannes Pinter	Julien Alexander Blank
Yvonne Catterfeld	Christine Heitz	Sebastiàn Millepied	Frederic Lipgens	Tina Naderer	Juan Geck
Yvonne Catterfeld	~~Robin Portmann~~	~~Melisa Toprakci~~	Jonny Mahoro und Jakob Ude	Jimmy Risch	Patrizia Gasser
Yvonne Catterfeld	Daniel Castro Dominguez	Christina Rodrigues	Alexander Babacan	Linda Helterhoff	David Blair
Samu Haber					
Samu Haber	Natia Todua	Lara Samira Will	Janina Beyerlein	Yagmur Yagan	Michael Kutscha
Samu Haber	Doris Mete	Chris Bertl	Georgia Loui	Marlin Williford	Selina Edbauer
Samu Haber	Dae-On Jung	Petra Wydler	Malina Stark	Tiago Ribeiro da Costa	Julia Schüler
Samu Haber	Carina Chère	Meike Ehnert	Nanette Foh	Mars	Mary-Anne Bröllochs
Samu Haber	Chiara Tahnee Lütje				

== Blind Auditions ==
Blind auditions color key
✔	Coach hit his/her "I WANT YOU" button
	Artist defaulted to this coach's team
	Artist elected to join this coach's team
	Artist was eliminated with no coach pressing their button
	Artist received an 'All Turn'.

=== Episode 1 (October 19) ===
Order	Artist	Song	Coach's and artist's choices			
Order	Artist	Song	Mark	Michi & Smudo	Yvonne	Samu
1	BB Thomaz	"Bang Bang"	✔	✔	✔	✔
2	Malina Stark	"Issues"	✔	–	–	✔
3	Benedikt Köstler	"Always On My Mind"	✔	✔	✔	✔
4	Patrick Strobel	"Rock and Roll"	✔	✔	–	✔
5	Philip Donath	"Castle on the Hill"	–	–	–	–
6	Jade Pearl Baker	"Moon River"	✔	✔	✔	✔
7	Selina Edbauer	"Green Light"	✔	–	–	✔
8	Melvin Vardouniotis	"Bridge over Troubled Water"	–	–	✔	✔
9	Mario Götz	"Lie To Me"	–	–	–	–
10	Lara Samira Will	"Let It Be"	✔	✔	✔	✔

=== Episode 2 (October 22) ===
Order	Artist	Song	Coach's and artist's choices			
Order	Artist	Song	Mark	Michi & Smudo	Yvonne	Samu
1	Michael Kutscha	"Sledgehammer"	✔	✔	✔	✔
2	Katy Winter	"Don't You Worry 'Bout A Thing"	✔	✔	–	✔
3	Esther Filly Ridstyle	"No Roots"	–	–	–	–
4	Georgia Loui	"Don't You Remember"	✔	✔	✔	✔
5	Valentino Di Cursi	"Feuerwerk"	–	–	–	–
6	David Blair	"As Long as You Love Me"	–	✔	✔	–
7	Meike Hammerschmidt	"Just a Girl"	✔	✔	✔	✔
8	Marco Antic	"You Shook Me All Night Long"	–	–	–	–
9	Robin Portmann	"There's Nothing Holdin' Me Back"	–	–	✔	✔
10	Natia Todua	"I Put a Spell on You"	✔	✔	✔	✔

=== Episode 3 (October 26) ===
Order	Artist	Song	Coach's and artist's choices			
Order	Artist	Song	Mark	Michi & Smudo	Yvonne	Samu
1	Stefanie Nerpel	"Free Fallin'"	–	✔	–	✔
2	Luana Eschment	"Morgens Immer Müde"	✔	✔	✔	✔
3	Angelo Walter	"Love Hurts"	–	–	–	–
4	Jakob & Jonny	"Let It Be Me"	–	✔	✔	–
5	Palina Vereti	"Chained to the Rhythm"	–	–	–	–
6	Chris Bertl	"Rise Like a Phoenix"	✔	–	–	✔
7	Filiz Arslan	"Doppelleben"	✔	✔	–	–
8	Marlin Williford	"Legendary"	✔	✔	✔	✔
9	Hang-Shuen Lee	"The Sound of Silence"	–	–	–	–
10	Maria Giuseppina Cammisa	"Chasing Highs"	✔	–	–	–
11	Mars	"Waterfalls"	✔	✔	–	✔

=== Episode 4 (October 29) ===
Order	Artist	Song	Coach's and artist's choices			
Order	Artist	Song	Mark	Michi & Smudo	Yvonne	Samu
1	Johannes Pinter	"Almost Is Never Enough"	✔	✔	✔	✔
2	Semion Bazlavouk	"Dance Little Sister"	✔	✔	✔	✔
3	Patrizia Gasser	"Running with the Wolves"	–	–	✔	✔
4	Jan Gülle	"Hard to Handle"	–	–	–	–
5	Gregor Hägele	"When You Love Someone"	✔	✔	✔	–
6	Salima Chiakh	"Soulman"	–	–	–	–
7	Mary-Anne Bröllochs	"Are You Gonna Be My Girl"	✔	✔	✔	✔
8	Mark Schlumberger	"Rückenwind"	✔	✔	✔	–
9	Raja	"Winter"	–	–	–	–
10	Sebastiàn Millepied	"Resolution"	✔	–	✔	✔

=== Episode 5 (November 2) ===
Order	Artist	Song	Coach's and artist's choices			
Order	Artist	Song	Mark	Michi & Smudo	Yvonne	Samu
1	Frederic Lipgens	"Shake It Off"	✔	–	✔	–
2	Alexander Babacan	"Sieben Milliarden"	✔	✔	✔	✔
3	Jana Elena Hlava	"Because of You"	–	–	–	–
4	Philip Piller	"Russian Roulette"	✔	✔	–	–
5	Isabell Jasmin Plaue	"Keiner Ist Wie Du"	✔	✔	–	–
6	Felipe Galleguillos	"Despacito"	–	–	–	–
7	Alexandra Sutter	"What a Wonderful World"	✔	✔	–	–
8	Hariett Hastreiter-Gross	"Tanz"	–	–	–	–
9	Tiago Ribeiro da Costa	"Angel by the Wings"	✔	✔	✔	✔
10	Julia Schüler	"Helium"	✔	–	–	✔
11	Charleen White	"I Love You I Do"	–	–	–	–
12	Amin Afify	"Hold On, We're Going Home"	✔	✔	✔	✔

=== Episode 6 (November 5) ===
Order	Artist	Song	Coach's and artist's choices			
Order	Artist	Song	Mark	Michi & Smudo	Yvonne	Samu
1	Chiara Tahnee Lütje	"Decode"	✔	✔	✔	✔
2	Felix Harer	"Can I Be Him"	✔	–	✔	–
3	Antje Reich	"Leichtes Gepäck"	–	–	–	–
4	Max Christoph Niemeyer	"Evermore"	–	✔	–	–
5	Yelin Güclüdal	"Scared to Be Lonely"	–	–	–	–
6	Dae-On Jung	"Desperado"	–	–	✔	✔
7	Helen Leahey	"Danny Boy"	✔	✔	–	–
8	Robel Ambaye	"Red"	–	–	–	–
9	Friederike Bayer	"Black Hole Sun"	–	✔	–	–
10	Tina Naderer	"Hold Back the River"	–	–	✔	✔
11	Frank Marpoder	"Sweet Home Chicago"	–	–	–	–
12	Luzie Juckenburg	"Don't Rain on My Parade"	✔	✔	–	–
13	Juan Geck	"Recovery"	✔	✔	✔	✔

=== Episode 7 (November 9) ===
Order	Artist	Song	Coach's and artist's choices			
Order	Artist	Song	Mark	Michi & Smudo	Yvonne	Samu
1	Julien Alexander Blank	"Where Did You Sleep Last Night"	–	✔	✔	–
2	Carina Chère	"Alone"	✔	–	–	✔
3	Shahd Syoufi	"Bird Set Free"	–	–	–	–
4	Michael Russ	"Perfect"	✔	✔	✔	✔
5	Doris Mete	"Work It"	✔	✔	–	–
6	Carole Curty	"Mehr als ein Lied"	–	–	–	–
7	Simon Zawila	"Gone Too Soon"	✔	✔	–	–
8	Melisa Toprakci	"Stay"	–	–	✔	–
9	Anna Heimrath	"It Ain't Me"	✔	✔	–	✔
10	Franz Lippert	"But For Grace Of God"	–	–	–	–
11	Jan Hasanov	"That's What I Like"	✔	–	–	–
12	Meike Ehnert	"O Mio Babbino Caro"	✔	✔	–	✔
13	Kim Friehs	"Sign of the Times"	✔	✔	–	✔

=== Episode 8 (November 12) ===
Order	Artist	Song	Coach's and artist's choices			
Order	Artist	Song	Mark	Michi & Smudo	Yvonne	Samu
1	Dajana Günther	"Wind Beneath My Wings"	✔	✔	–	–
2	Dzenan Buldic	"Classic"	✔	✔	✔	✔
3	Sarah Isabelle Ksouri	"Best Thing I Never Had"	–	–	–	–
4	Michael Oehrlein	"Nur in meinem Kopf"	✔	–	✔	–
5	Silke und Alexander Mohnfeld	"Need You Now"	✔	–	–	–
6	Daniel Denmark	"Gettin' Jiggy wit It"	–	–	–	–
7	Christina Rodrigues	"On & On"	–	✔	✔	–
8	Yagmur Yagan	"Domino"	✔	✔	✔	✔
9	Damiano Maiolini	"Sleeping At Last"	–	–	–	–
10	Tasha Gonser	"Schön genug"	✔	–	–	–
11	Barbara Padron Hernandez	"Run Boy Run"	✔	✔	–	–
12	Markus Rodenbäck	"Bonnie & Clyde"	–	–	–	–
13	Daniel Castro Dominguez	"Million Years Ago"	✔	✔	✔	✔

== Final ==
Rank	Contestant	Coach	Songs		Televoting
1	Natia Todua	Samu Haber			
1	Natia Todua	Samu Haber	Coverversion	"With a Little Help from My Friends"	50,10%
1	Natia Todua	Samu Haber	Duet with Coach	"I Help You Hate Me"	50,10%
1	Natia Todua	Samu Haber	Duet with Guest Artist	"We Could Run" with Beth Ditto	50,10%
2	Benedikt Köstler	Mark Forster			
2	Benedikt Köstler	Mark Forster	Coverversion	"Your Song"	25,45%
2	Benedikt Köstler	Mark Forster	Duet with Coach	"Kogong"	25,45%
2	Benedikt Köstler	Mark Forster	Duet with Guest Artist	"Anywhere" with Rita Ora	25,45%
3	Anna Heimrath	Michi & Smudo	Coverversion	"Beneath Your Beautiful"	16,79%
3	Anna Heimrath	Michi & Smudo	Duet with Coach	"A-N-N-A"	16,79%
3	Anna Heimrath	Michi & Smudo	Duet with Guest Artist	"Don’t Give Me Those Eyes" with James Blunt	16,79%
4	BB Thomaz	Yvonne Catterfeld	Coverversion	"Empire State of Mind"	7,66%
4	BB Thomaz	Yvonne Catterfeld	Duet with Coach	"Was bleibt"	7,66%
4	BB Thomaz	Yvonne Catterfeld	Duet with Guest Artist	"Love So Soft" with Kelly Clarkson	7,66%
