= The Voice of Germany season 6 =

The Voice of Germany
- Season 6
- Hosted by: Thore Schölermann; Lena Gercke
- Judges: Samu Haber; Yvonne Catterfeld; Michi Beck & Smudo; Andreas Bourani
- Winner: Tay Schmedtmann
- Winning coach: Andreas Bourani
- Runner-up: Robin Resch

Release
- Original network: ProSieben and Sat.1
- Original release: October 20 – December 18, 2016

Season chronology
- ← Previous; Season 5 Next → Season 7

The Voice of Germany is a German reality talent show that premiered its sixth season on October 20, 2016 on ProSieben and Sat.1. Based on the reality singing competition The Voice of Holland, the series was created by Dutch television producer John de Mol. It is part of an international series. Andreas Bourani and Michi Beck & Smudo returned as coaches from the previous season, alongside Samu Haber who returned after a one season hiatus, replacing Rea Garvey. Yvonne Catterfeld joined the show as a new coach, replacing Stefanie Kloß from the previous season. The host(s) for this season will be Thore Schölermann and Lena Gercke.

Tay Schmedtmann was announced as the winner of The Voice of Germany, marking Andreas Bourani's first and only win as a coach.

== Coaches and Hosts ==
On 30 April 2016, it was announced that Rea Garvey would exit the panel and Samu Haber would once again join the coaching panel after a hiatus from the previous season. On 14 June 2016, it was announced that Michi & Smudo and Andreas Bourani would be returning as coaches, while Stefanie Kloß would exit the show. Yvonne Catterfield was announced to take her place. With Garvey's departure, this is the first season to not feature any coaches from the shows inaugural season. The hosts remained the same for this season.

The Voice of Germany season 6 coaches

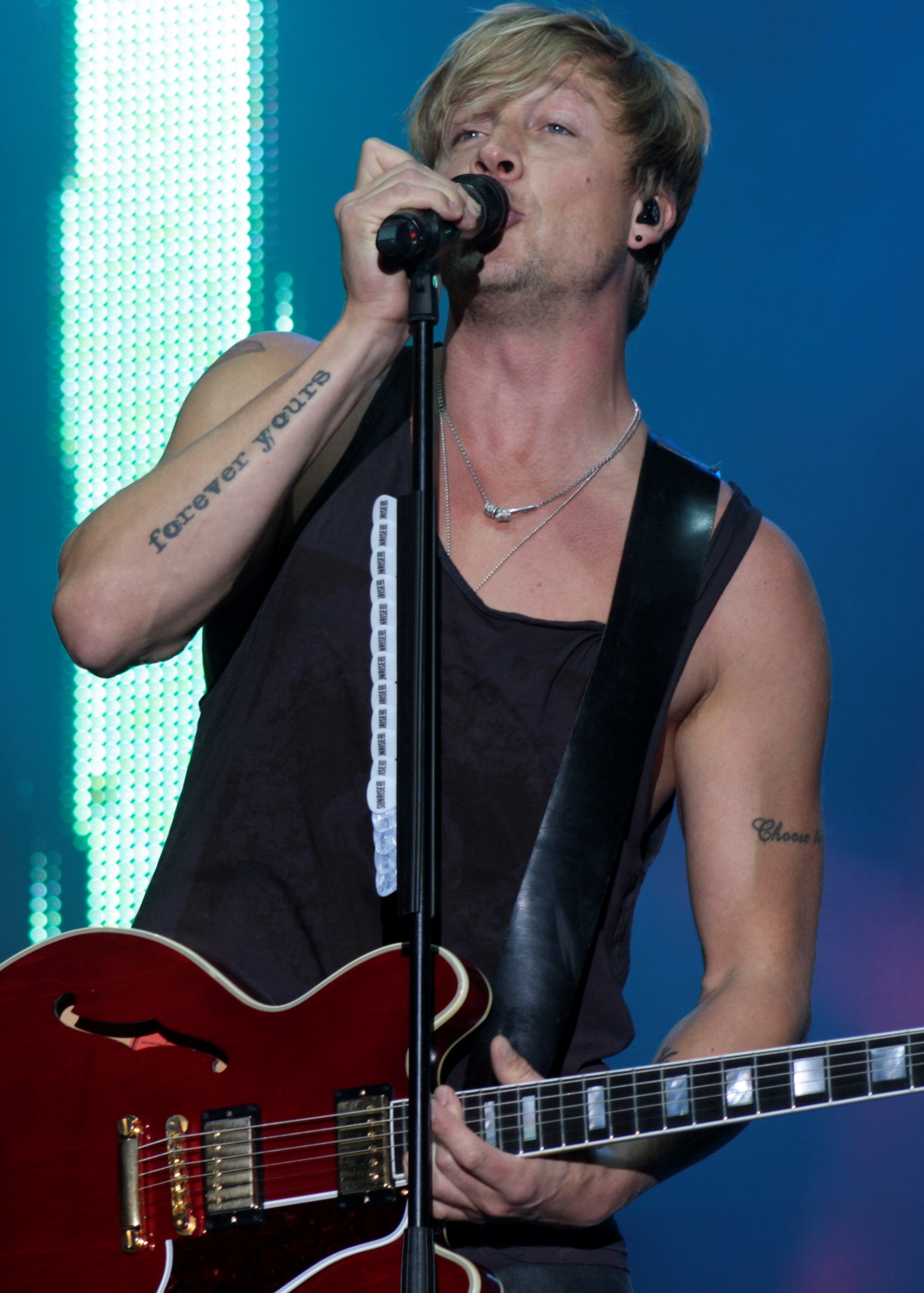
Samu Haber

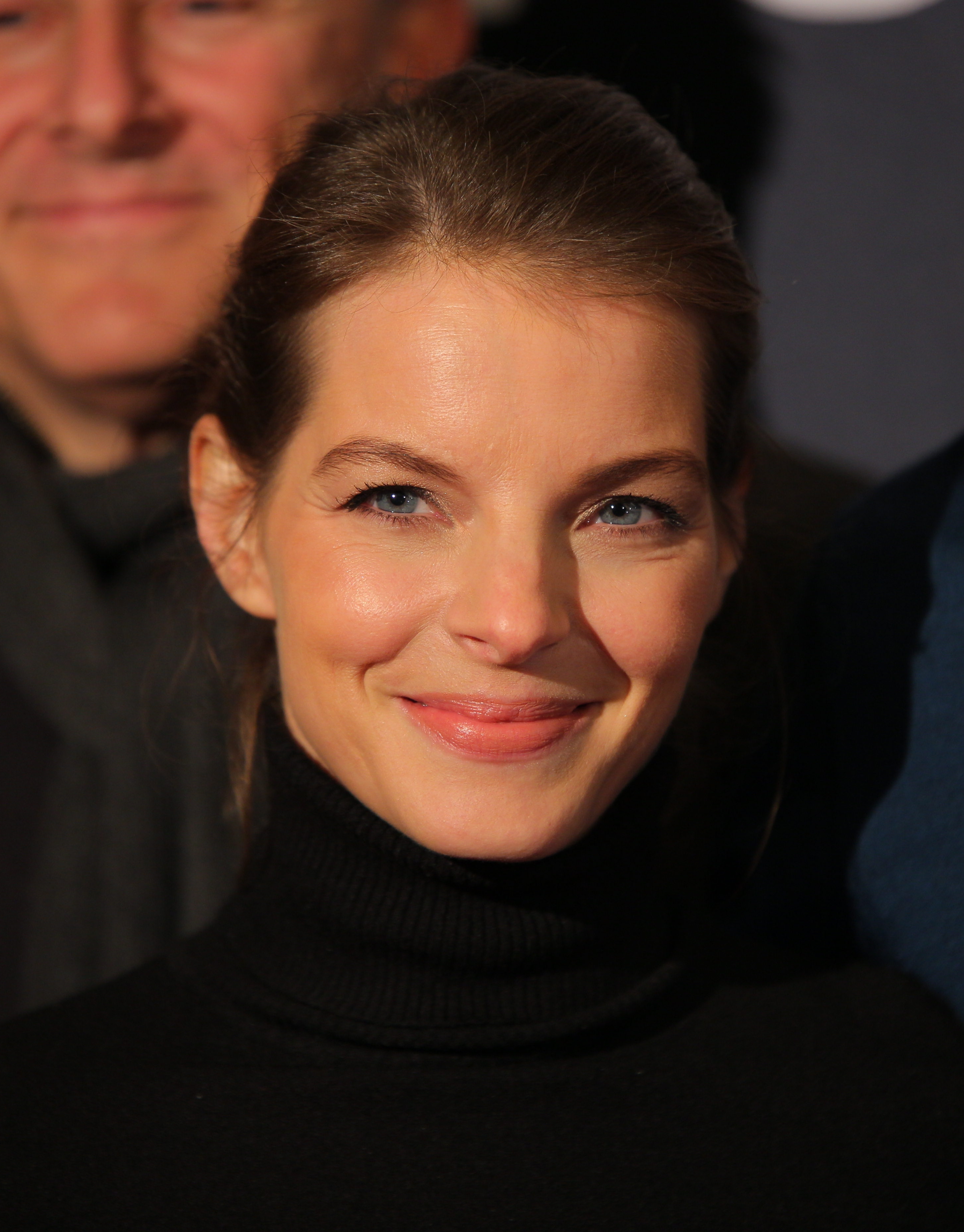
Yvonne Catterfeld

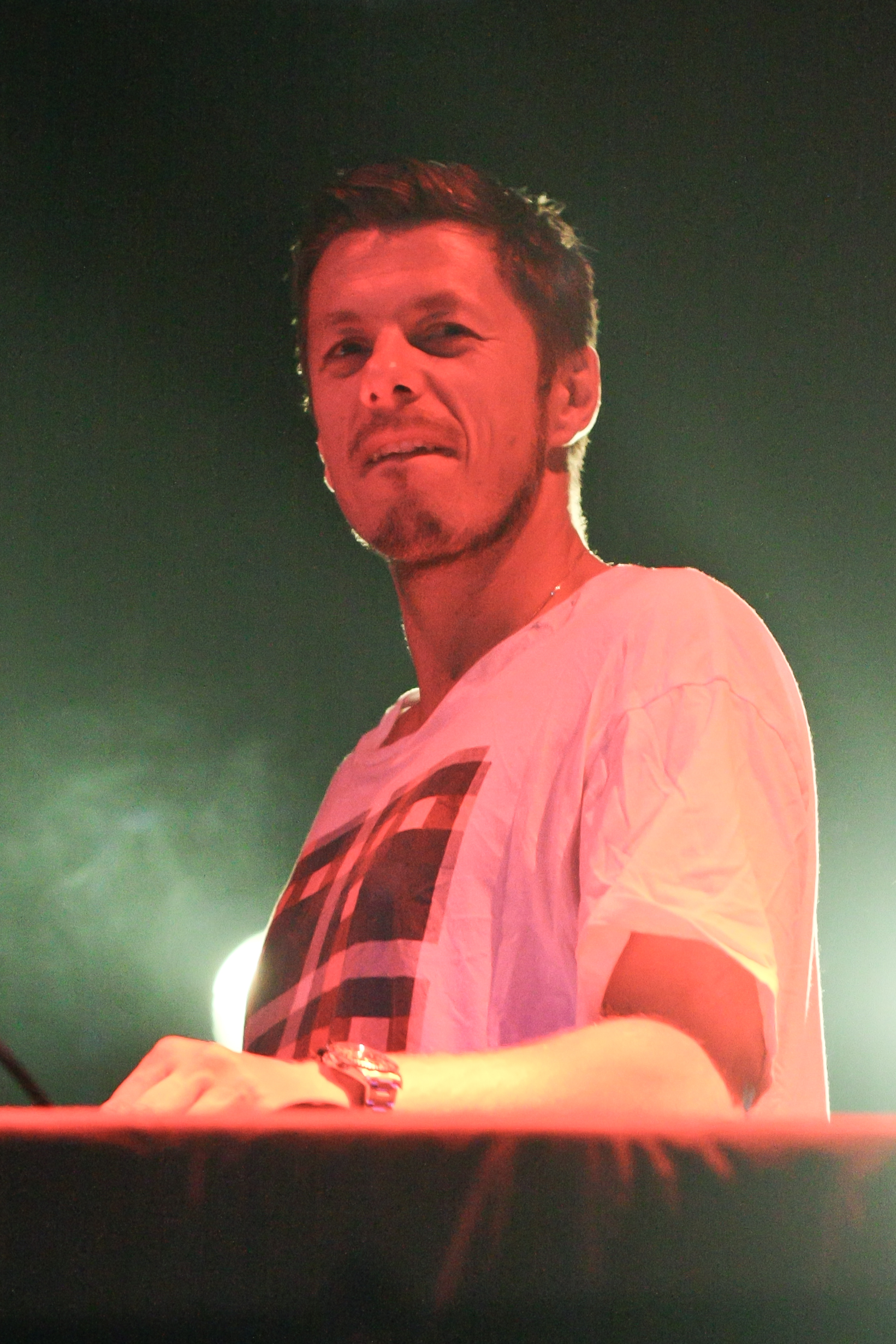
Michi

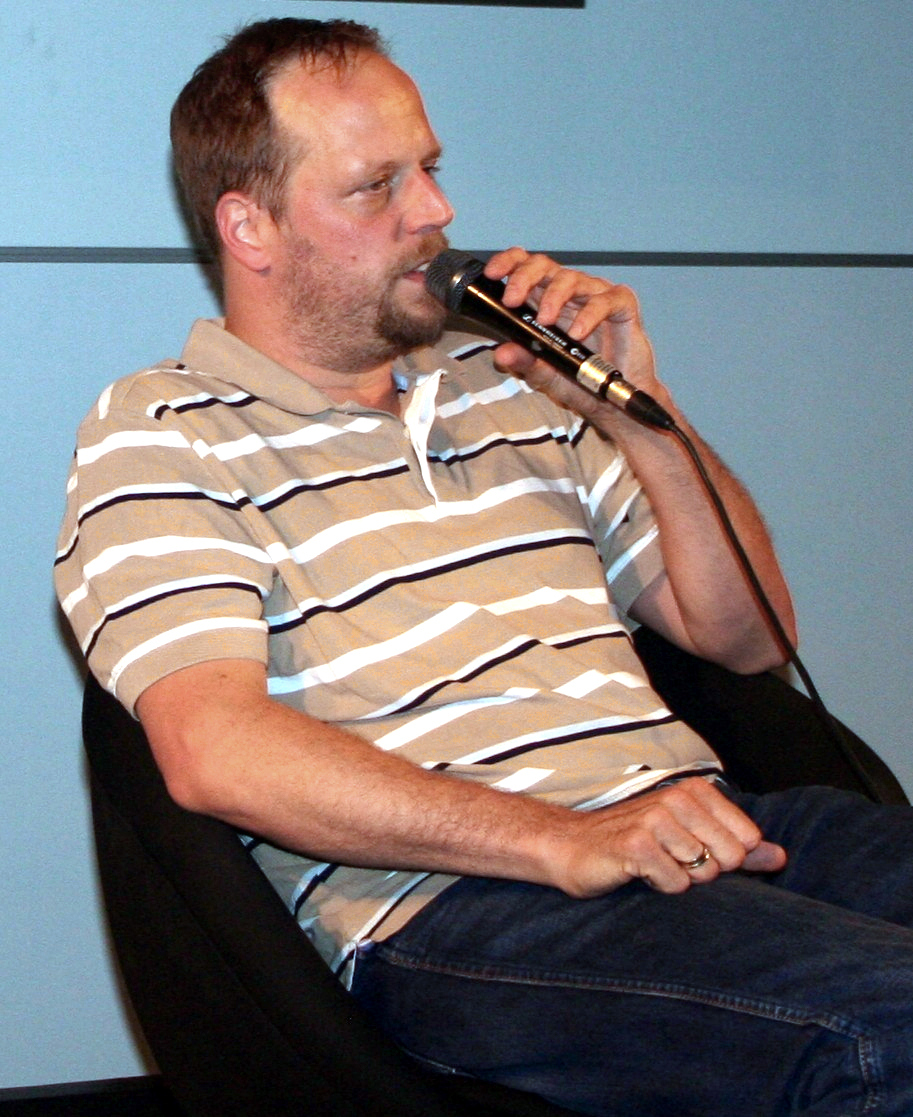
Smudo

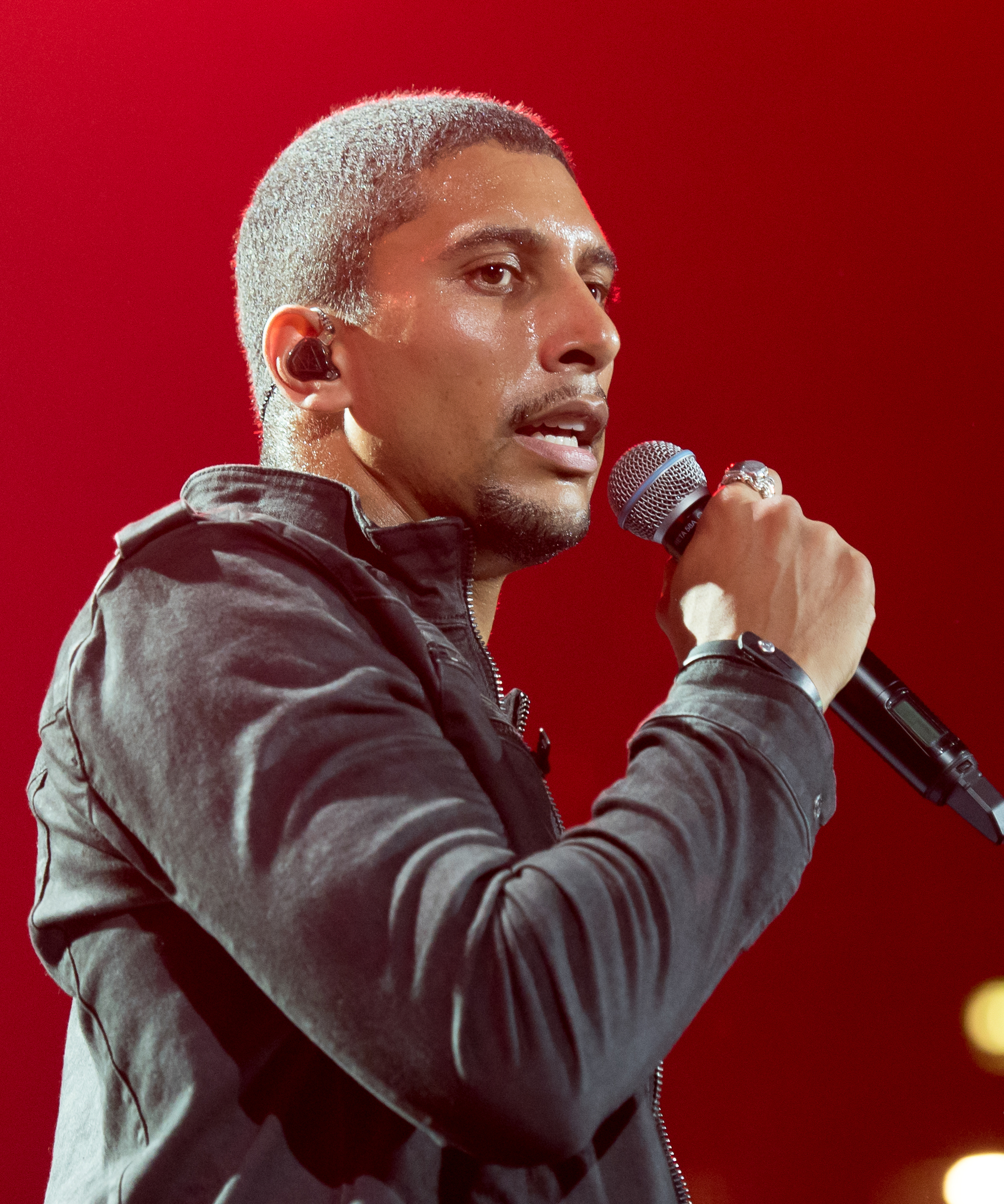
Andreas Bourani

== Teams ==
- Winner
- Runner-up
- Third place
- Fourth place
- Eliminated in the Semi-final
- Eliminated in the Knockout rounds
- Stolen in the Battle rounds
- Eliminated in the Battle rounds

| Coach | Top 73 Artists | | | | | | |
|---|---|---|---|---|---|---|---|
| Samu Haber | | | | | | | |
| Samu Haber | Robin Resch | Stas Schurins | Florian Unger | Fabian Ludwig | Laura Ritter | Anna-Lena Schäfer | Dorothea Proschko |
| Samu Haber | Andreas Steiger | Andrina Travers | Anna-Maria Nemetz | ~~Vanessa Iraci~~ | ~~Bünyamin Yazici~~ | Sem Eisinger | Fabian Blesin |
| Samu Haber | Vincenzo Iuzzolini | Louisa Jones | Nicole Bührer | Dehua Hu | Maja Endres | | |
| Yvonne Catterfeld | | | | | | | |
| Yvonne Catterfeld | Boris Alexander Stein | Vera Tavares | Friedemann Petter | Mathea Elisabeth Höller | Alessio Loriga | Nico Laska | Vanessa Iraci |
| Yvonne Catterfeld | Marie Claudia Apenou | Flávio Martins | Pauline Steinbrecher | ~~Jonny vom Dahl~~ | Darius Zander | Daria Müller | Mimoza, Vjollca & Shkurte Mustafa |
| Yvonne Catterfeld | Victoria Mishchenko | Anja Kraml | Artur Molin | Viktoria Andonova | Angelina Schmigelski | | |
| Michi & Smudo | | | | | | | |
| Michi & Smudo | Marc Amacher | Robert Ildefonso | Yasmin Sidibe | Lara Trautmann | Danyal Demir | Jonny vom Dahl | Florentina Krasniqi |
| Michi & Smudo | Ruth Lomboto | Lukas Räuftlin | Sally Grayson | Schpresim Ahmeti | Michael Wansch | Marco Pinto | Elena Ancuta Stegaru |
| Michi & Smudo | Martin Menzel | Celena Pieper | Georg Stengel | Selina Grinberg | Marijana Maksimovic | | |
| Andreas Bourani | | | | | | | |
| Andreas Bourani | Tay Schmedtmann | Lucie Fischer | Michael Caliman | Bünyamin Yazici | Steven Sylvester Ludkowski | Joel Guzman | Leon Braje |
| Andreas Bourani | Daniel Moczarski | Neo Kaliske | Jonas Hug | ~~Anna-Maria Nemetz~~ | Marina Mast | Sarah Maier, Teresa Pleger & Maria Vogl-Fernheim | Jayla Brown |
| Andreas Bourani | Daniela Oude Kotte | Sarah Sacher | Adrian Schiele | Homsing Ronra Shinray | Theresa Gratzl | Daniel Ferrer | |
Note: Italicized names are stolen artists (names struck through within former teams).

== Blind Auditions ==
=== Episode 1 (October 20) ===
| Order | Artist | Song | Coach's and artist's choices | | | |
| Order | Artist | Song | Samu | Yvonne | Michi & Smudo | Andreas |
|---|---|---|---|---|---|---|
| 1 | Danyal Demir | "Pony" | ✔ | ✔ | ✔ | ✔ |
| 2 | Vera Tavares | "Oops!... I Did It Again" | – | ✔ | ✔ | ✔ |
| 3 | Maggie Jane | "The Real Thing" | – | – | – | – |
| 4 | Bünyamin Yazici | "Das ist Dein Leben" | ✔ | ✔ | – | ✔ |
| 5 | Michael Wansch | "Confrontation" | – | – | ✔ | – |
| 6 | Diana & Daniela Alexander | "Pendel" | – | – | – | – |
| 7 | Darius Zander | "80 Millionen" | ✔ | ✔ | – | ✔ |
| 8 | Marina Mast | "Ghost" | ✔ | – | – | ✔ |
| 9 | Aleksandra Ziolkowska | "Me, Myself & I" | – | – | – | – |
| 10 | Marc Amacher | "For What It's Worth" | ✔ | ✔ | ✔ | ✔ |

=== Episode 2 (October 23) ===
| Order | Artist | Song | Coach's and artist's choices | | | |
| Order | Artist | Song | Samu | Yvonne | Michi & Smudo | Andreas |
|---|---|---|---|---|---|---|
| 1 | Mathea Höller | "Ex's & Oh's" | ✔ | ✔ | ✔ | ✔ |
| 2 | Hanna Czarnecka | "Diva's Dance" | – | – | – | – |
| 3 | Georg Stengel | "Pocahontas" | – | – | ✔ | ✔ |
| 4 | Ruth Lomboto | "I Wanna Dance with Somebody" | ✔ | ✔ | ✔ | ✔ |
| 5 | Ruben Dimitri | "Diamonds" | – | – | – | – |
| 6 | Dorothea Proschko | "Nobody's Perfect" | ✔ | ✔ | – | ✔ |
| 7 | Pauline Steinbrecher | "When We Were Young" | – | ✔ | – | – |
| 8 | Michael Caliman | "Wishing Well" | – | ✔ | – | ✔ |
| 9 | Pigs Can't Fly | "Here Comes the Sun" | – | – | – | – |
| 10 | Stas Schurins | "7 Years" | ✔ | ✔ | ✔ | ✔ |

=== Episode 3 (October 27) ===
| Order | Artist | Song | Coach's and artist's choices | | | |
| Order | Artist | Song | Samu | Yvonne | Michi & Smudo | Andreas |
|---|---|---|---|---|---|---|
| 1 | Friedemann Petter | "Jackpot" | ✔ | ✔ | ✔ | ✔ |
| 2 | Shpresim Ahmeti | "It's a Man's Man's Man's World" | – | ✔ | ✔ | – |
| 3 | Jesse Kolb | "Numb/Encore" | – | – | – | – |
| 4 | Victoria Mishchenko | "Always" | ✔ | ✔ | ✔ | – |
| 5 | Robin Resch | "Wasn't Expecting That" | ✔ | ✔ | ✔ | ✔ |
| 6 | Anna-Maria Nemetz | "Freedom" | – | ✔ | – | ✔ |
| 7 | Julien Alexander Blank | "Heart-Shaped Box" | – | – | – | – |
| 8 | Lucie Fischer | "Don't Let Me Down" | – | – | – | ✔ |
| 9 | Laura Jane Fischer | "Hold On, We're Going Home" | – | – | – | – |
| 10 | Lukas Räuftlin | "Wohin Du Gehst" | – | – | ✔ | – |
| 11 | Lina Marie Walbracht | "Catch & Release" | – | – | – | – |
| 12 | Dehua Hu | "Talking to the Moon" | ✔ | ✔ | – | ✔ |

=== Episode 4 (October 30) ===
| Order | Artist | Song | Coach's and artist's choices | | | |
| Order | Artist | Song | Samu | Yvonne | Michi & Smudo | Andreas |
|---|---|---|---|---|---|---|
| 1 | Sally Grayson | "The Love Cats" | ✔ | – | ✔ | ✔ |
| 2 | Anja Kraml | "I'd Rather Go Blind" | ✔ | ✔ | ✔ | ✔ |
| 3 | Lin Gothoni | "Ein Letztes Lied" | – | – | – | – |
| 4 | Martin Menzel | "Frauen Regiern' Die Welt" | – | – | ✔ | ✔ |
| 5 | Marie Claudia Apenou | "No One" | ✔ | ✔ | ✔ | ✔ |
| 6 | Phillip Mandel | "The Take Over, the Breaks Over" | – | – | – | – |
| 7 | Andreas Steiger | "Speeding Cars" | ✔ | ✔ | – | ✔ |
| 8 | Joel Guzman | "I'm Not the Only One" | ✔ | ✔ | ✔ | ✔ |
| 9 | Louisa Jones | "Dog Days Are Over" | ✔ | – | – | – |
| 10 | Hanna Rohkohl | "Titanium" | – | – | – | – |
| 11 | Florian Unger | "Bis Ans Ender der Welt" | ✔ | ✔ | ✔ | ✔ |

=== Episode 5 (November 3) ===
| Order | Artist | Song | Coach's and artist's choices | | | |
| Order | Artist | Song | Samu | Yvonne | Michi & Smudo | Andreas |
|---|---|---|---|---|---|---|
| 1 | Tay Schmedtmann | "Starke Schulter" | ✔ | ✔ | ✔ | ✔ |
| 2 | Andrina Travers | "Heavy Cross" | ✔ | – | ✔ | – |
| 3 | Hanna Szczepkowska | "Ship to Wreck" | – | – | – | – |
| 4 | Flávio Martins | "So Sick" | – | ✔ | – | – |
| 5 | Kai Thurau | "The Look" | – | – | – | – |
| 6 | Viktoriya Andonova | "You're Nobody till Somebody Loves You" | ✔ | ✔ | – | – |
| 7 | Yvonne Kamermann | "Dream a Little Dream of Me" | – | – | – | – |
| 8 | Daniel Ferrer | "Fever" | – | ✔ | ✔ | ✔ |
| 9 | Tim Heberlein | "Watch Over You" | – | – | – | – |
| 10 | Lara Trautmann | "Das Leben Ist Schön" | ✔ | – | ✔ | – |
| 11 | Homsing Ronra Shimray | "Shadow of the Day" | – | – | – | ✔ |
| 12 | Florian Pfitzner | "Wir Sind Groß" | – | – | – | – |
| 13 | Vanessa Iraci | "How Come U Don't Call Me Anymore?" | ✔ | ✔ | ✔ | ✔ |

=== Episode 6 (November 6) ===
| Order | Artist | Song | Coach's and artist's choices | | | |
| Order | Artist | Song | Samu | Yvonne | Michi & Smudo | Andreas |
|---|---|---|---|---|---|---|
| 1 | Daniela Oude Kotte | "Gravity" | – | – | ✔ | ✔ |
| 2 | Leon Braje | "Wunderbare Jahre" | ✔ | ✔ | ✔ | ✔ |
| 3 | Gitty | "Man! I Feel Like a Woman!" | – | – | – | – |
| 4 | Florentina Krasniqi | "This Is What You Came For" | – | – | ✔ | – |
| 5 | Robert Ildefonso | "Lost Stars" | – | ✔ | ✔ | – |
| 6 | Marco Weichselbraun | "Livin' on a Prayer" | – | – | – | – |
| 7 | Maja Endres | "Sexy and I Know It" | ✔ | – | – | – |
| 8 | Jonny vom Dahl | "Durch Die Schweren Zeiten" | ✔ | ✔ | – | – |
| 9 | Lawrence Pinoyski | "Feel Good Inc." | – | – | – | – |
| 10 | Celena Pieper | "Thinking of You" | – | – | ✔ | – |
| 11 | Sarah, Maria & Teresa | "Das Gold Von Morgen" | – | – | ✔ | ✔ |
| 12 | Fabian Storzum | "One Dance" | – | – | – | – |
| 13 | Alessio Loriga | "Schwarz Auf Weiss" | ✔ | ✔ | ✔ | ✔ |

=== Episode 7 (November 6) ===
| Order | Artist | Song | Coach's and artist's choices | | | |
| Order | Artist | Song | Samu | Yvonne | Michi & Smudo | Andreas |
|---|---|---|---|---|---|---|
| 1 | Anna-Lena Schäfer | "Barfuß Am Klavier" | ✔ | ✔ | ✔ | – |
| 2 | Angelina Schmigelski | "Piece by Piece" | – | ✔ | – | – |
| 3 | Olaf Klaas | "Unchain My Heart" | – | – | – | – |
| 4 | Elena Ancuta Stegaru | "Sax" | ✔ | ✔ | ✔ | ✔ |
| 5 | Nicole Bührer | "Sweet Child o' Mine" | ✔ | – | – | – |
| 6 | Daniel Johnson | "A Sky Full of Stars" | – | – | – | – |
| 7 | Boris Alexander Stein | "Im Schneckenhaus" | – | ✔ | – | – |
| 8 | Sarah Sacher | "Liebe Ist" | ✔ | – | – | ✔ |
| 9 | Artur Molin | "The Most Beautiful Girl in the World" | – | ✔ | – | ✔ |
| 10 | Kai Schernbeck | "If I Could Fly" | – | – | – | – |
| 11 | Marco Pinto | "Lego House" | ✔ | – | ✔ | – |
| 12 | Sem Eisinger | "One Call Away" | ✔ | ✔ | ✔ | ✔ |

== Final ==
| Rang | Contestant | Coach | Songs | | Televoting round 1 | Televoting round 2 |
|---|---|---|---|---|---|---|
| 1 | Tay Schmedtmann | Andreas Bourani | Coverversion | "Sie sieht mich nicht" | | 53,87 % |
| 1 | Tay Schmedtmann | Andreas Bourani | Duet with Coach | "Eisberg" | | 53,87 % |
| 1 | Tay Schmedtmann | Andreas Bourani | Duet with Guest Artist | "Love Me Now" with John Legend | | 53,87 % |
| 1 | Tay Schmedtmann | Andreas Bourani | Winner single | "Lauf Baby Lauf" | | 53,87 % |
| 2 | Robin Resch | Samu Haber | Coverversion | "Photograph" | | 46,13 % |
| 2 | Robin Resch | Samu Haber | Duet with Coach | "Hollywood Hills" | | 46,13 % |
| 2 | Robin Resch | Samu Haber | Duet with Guest Artist | "Say You Won't Let Go" with James Arthur | | 46,13 % |
| 2 | Robin Resch | Samu Haber | Winner single | "Disneyland" | | 46,13 % |
| 3 | Marc Amacher | Michi & Smudo | Coverversion | "Are You Gonna Go My Way" | | — |
| 3 | Marc Amacher | Michi & Smudo | Duet with Coach | "Ernten was wir säen" | | — |
| 3 | Marc Amacher | Michi & Smudo | Duet with Guest Artist | "Breathing Underwater" with Emeli Sandé | | — |
| 4 | Boris Alexander Stein | Yvonne Catterfeld | Coverversion | "Demo (Letzter Tag)" | | — |
| 4 | Boris Alexander Stein | Yvonne Catterfeld | Duet with Coach | "Irgendwas" | | — |
| 4 | Boris Alexander Stein | Yvonne Catterfeld | Duet with Guest Artist | "Let's Hurt Tonight" with OneRepublic | | — |

== Contestants, who appeared in previous seasons ==
- Florian Pfitzner participated in season 4, but no coach turned for him
