= Ben Dolic =

Slovenian singer (born 1997)

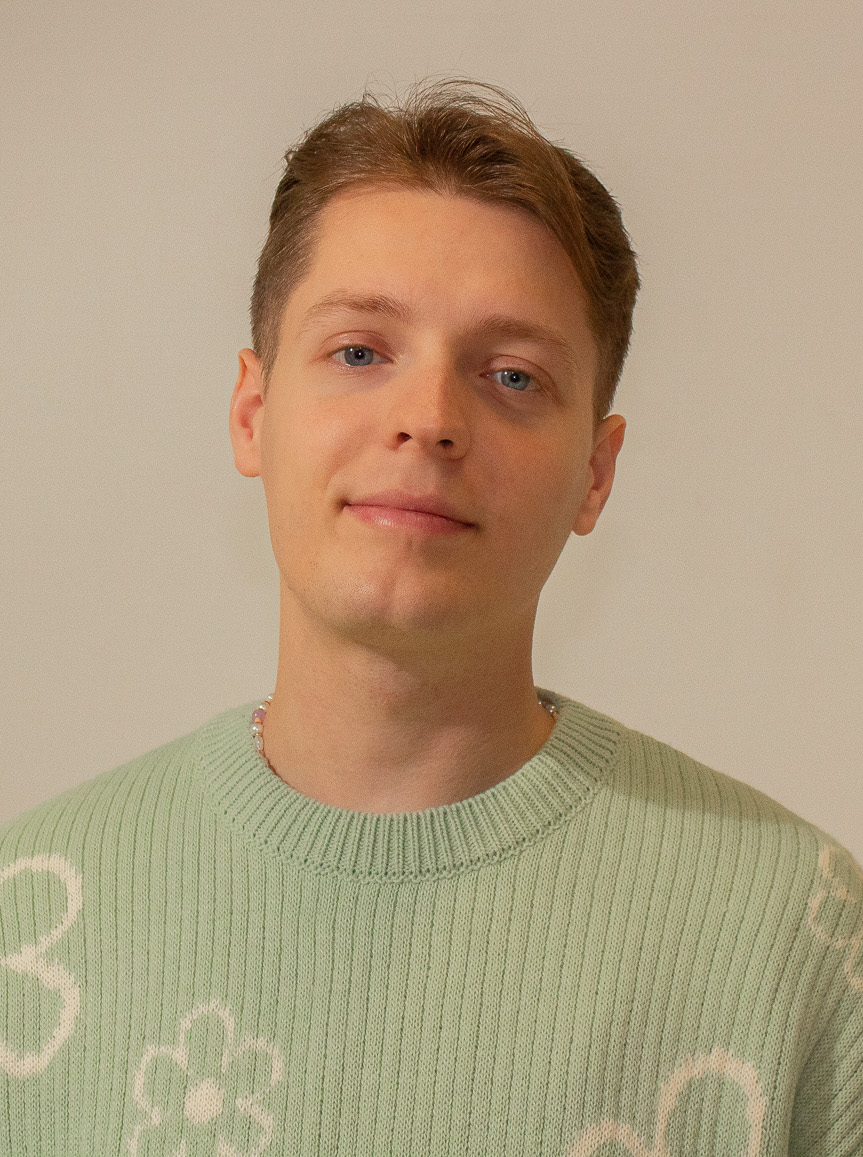
- Dolic in 2023

Background information
- Born: Benjamin Dolić; 4 May 1997 (age 29); Ljubljana, Slovenia
- Genres: Pop, R&B
- Occupations: Singer, Songwriter
- Instruments: Vocals, piano, guitar
- Years active: 2016–present
- Formerly of: D Base
- Website: bendolic.com

Benjamin Dolić (born 4 May 1997), known professionally as Ben Dolic, is a Slovenian singer. He gained popularity in Germany after his participation in the eighth season of The Voice of Germany. Dolic would have represented Germany in the Eurovision Song Contest 2020 held in Rotterdam with the song "Violent Thing" before it was cancelled due to the COVID-19 pandemic.

== Early life ==
Dolic was born in Ljubljana to Bosnian parents from Velika Kladuša.

== Career ==
=== Early career ===
At the age of 12, Dolic was a contestant in Slovenija ima talent, the Slovenian version of Got Talent, in which he reached the semi-final. He then began competing in numerous song festivals for children, such as the Turkish Olympics, where he won a silver medal and headed on tour around Turkey, performing in stadiums and arenas for up to 40,000 people. While in high school, he became part of the group D Base. With the group he participated in EMA 2016, the Slovenian preselection for the Eurovision Song Contest 2016.

=== 2018: The Voice of Germany ===
In 2018, Dolic auditioned for the eighth season of The Voice of Germany with the song "No Tears Left to Cry" by Ariana Grande. He caught the interest of judges Yvonne Catterfeld and Mark Forster and headed into the next round joining team Yvonne. This led him all the way to the final, where Ben performed with Swedish Pop star Zara Larsson and finished second, behind the winner Samuel Rösch. Ben embarked upon The Voice of Germany Live in Concert Tour and performed in multiple arenas across Germany and Austria.

The Voice of Germany performances and results
Round	Song	Original artist	Result
Blind Audition	"No Tears Left to Cry"	Ariana Grande	Joined Team Yvonne
The Battles	"Cry Me a River"	Justin Timberlake	Winner
The Sing-Offs	"Stay"	Rihanna ft. Mikky Ekko	Advanced
Semi-final	"Can't Help Falling in Love"	Elvis Presley	Advanced
Final	"Creep"	Radiohead	Runner-up
Final	"Ruin My Life"	Zara Larsson	Runner-up
Final	"She's Out of My Life"	Michael Jackson	Runner-up

=== 2020: Eurovision Song Contest ===
On 27 February 2020, the German broadcaster ARD announced that Dolic had been internally selected to represent Germany in the Eurovision Song Contest 2020 held in Rotterdam, Netherlands with the song "Violent Thing". The single was Ben’s debut release and very quickly made its way into the German airplay charts, major Spotify editorial playlists and was a fan favourite for the competition. However, on 18 March, 2020, the event was cancelled due to the COVID-19 pandemic.

== Discography ==
=== Extended plays ===
Title	Details
How I'm Feeling	Released: 9 October 2024; Label: Self-released; Formats: Digital download, streaming

=== Singles ===
Title	Year	Album or EP
"Violent Thing"	2020	Non-album singles
"Stuck in My Mind"	2021	Non-album singles
"Kissing Her, Missing You"	2022	Non-album singles
"Breakaway"	2022	Non-album singles
"Come By"	2022	Non-album singles
"Headspace"	2023	How I'm Feeling
"How I'm Feeling"	2023	How I'm Feeling
"Alright"	2024	How I'm Feeling
"Still the Same"	2024	How I'm Feeling
"Colours"	2024	Non-album singles
"Hold On"	2026	Non-album singles
"Vertigo"	2026	Non-album singles

Preceded by S!sters with "Sister"	Germany in the Eurovision Song Contest; 2020 (cancelled)	Succeeded by Jendrik Sigwart with "I Don't Feel Hate"
