= If They Only Knew (song) =

Single by Alfie Arcuri
- Released: 19 May 2017
- Recorded: 2017
- Genre: Pop
- Length: 3:44
- Label: Universal Music Australia
- Songwriters: Alfie Arcuri; Toby Lee; Cameron Nacson

Alfie Arcuri singles chronology
"Cruel" (2016)	"If They Only Knew" (2017)	"Love is Love" (2017)

Music video
- "If They Only Knew" on YouTube

"If They Only Knew" is a song by Australian singer-songwriter Alfie Arcuri. It was released digitally in May 2017, as the lead single from his planned but unreleased second studio album.

== Background and release ==
In 2016, Arcuri won the fifth season of The Voice Australia and released a studio album of covers performed on the show shortly after. The album, Zenith, peaked at number 5 on the ARIA Charts.

Arcuri then began to write material. In an interview with auspOp, Arcuri explained: "I never intended "If They Only Knew" to be a single, but it ended up affecting me the most. When you feel heartbreak for the very first time, it's the most extreme emotion, other than being in love. I can't explain how it makes me feel that I've written it and hopefully people will connect to it the way I have."

The song is a love story from a previous relationship, whereby Arcuri's ex-partner's parents did not know he was gay. "I fell in love with this guy and it was instant love," Arcuri explained. "We were together for a couple of years and half way through the relationship he came out. The song is almost like a diary entry for me telling his parents how innocent our love and relationship was because to them I was like the devil who turned their son gay. It wasn't like that at all though, it was a beautiful love."

Arcuri performed the song live on The Voice Australia on 25 June 2017.

== Music video ==
The music video for "If They Only Knew" was released on 30 June 2017. Arcuri told auspOp: "Acceptance is something that we all struggle with. For some young people that challenge involves discovering their identity and their sexuality. Being gay myself, I struggled to accept my sexuality for quite sometime." He added, "I worked with a team of people and together we have shot a short film for "If They Only Knew" exploring some of the challenges that young LGBTQ people face. I believe that by sharing our stories we can inspire empathy and help support anyone going through that struggle. Love is Love."

== Charts ==
Chart performance for "If They Only Knew"
Chart (2016)	Peak position
Australia (ARIA)	96

== Release history ==
Release history and formats for "If They Only Knew"
Country	Date	Format	Edition	Label
Australia	19 May 2017	Digital download	Standard	Universal Music Australia
Australia	23 June 2017	Digital download	Stripped back	Universal Music Australia
