= Alfie Arcuri =

Australian singer-songwriter (born 1988)

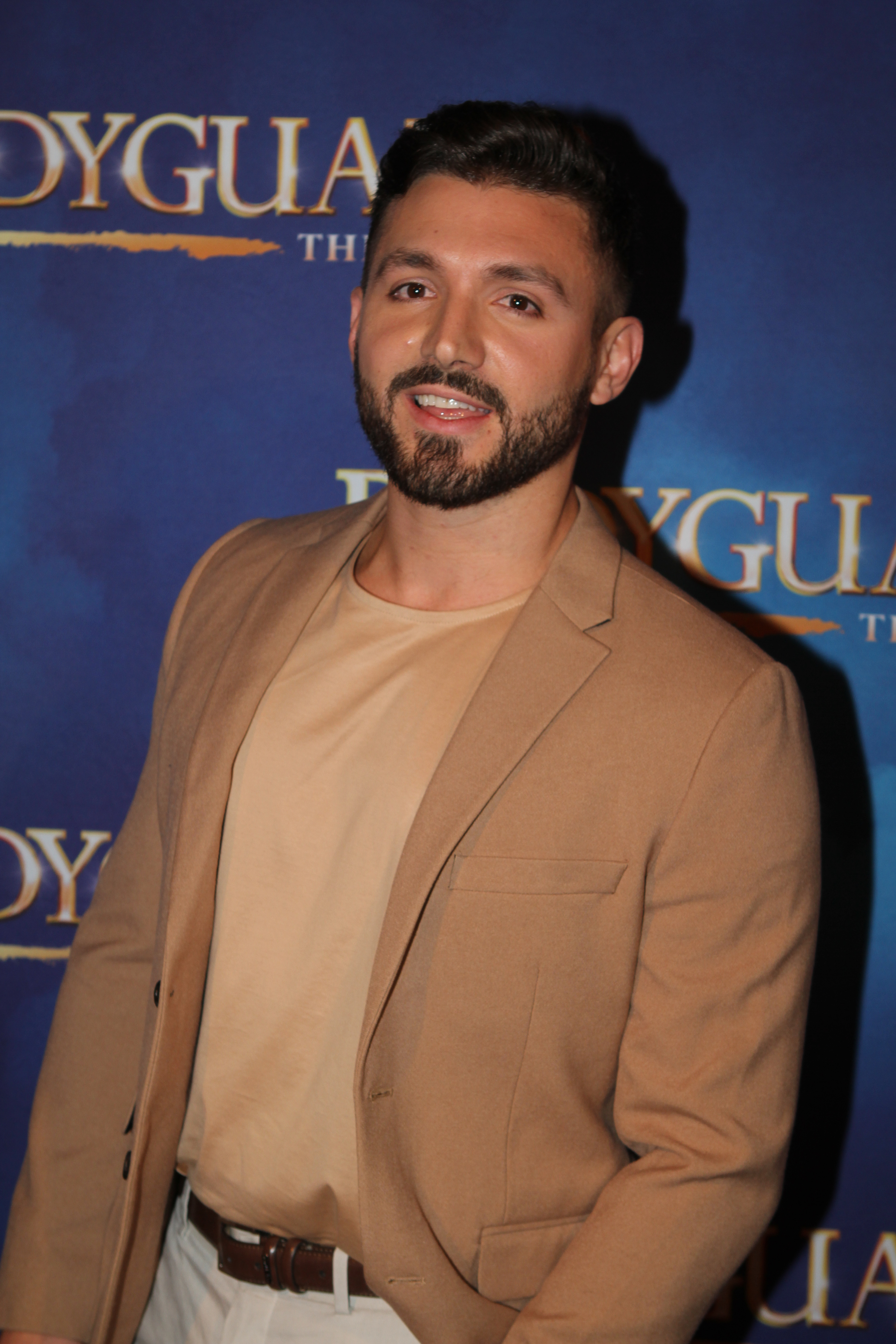

Background information
- Born: 19 April 1988 (age 38); Central Coast, New South Wales, Australia
- Genre: Pop
- Occupations: Singer, songwriter
- Years active: 2016–present
- Labels: Universal Music Australia, King Gary Records

Alfred James Arcuri (19 April 1988) is an Australian singer-songwriter best known for winning the fifth season of The Voice Australia in 2016. He signed with Universal Music Australia. His debut studio album Zenith was released in July 2016 and peaked at number 5 on the ARIA Charts.

== Early life ==
Arcuri was born to an Italian family and grew up in Camden, New South Wales. He is a qualified architect, working at Mosca Pserras Architects until 2014. He told his family he was gay in 2013, when he was 24 years old.

== Career ==
=== 2016–2018: The Voice and Zenith ===
In 2016 Arcuri took part in the fifth season of The Voice Australia, where he joined Delta Goodrem's team, and was the first auditionee. He made it through to the Grand Finale and on 10 July, he was announced as the winner.

denotes having been in the bottom four. denotes winner.

The Voice performances and results (2016)
| Episode | Song | Original Artist | Result |
|---|---|---|---|
| Audition | "Scars" | James Bay | Through to Battle rounds |
| Battle Rounds | "Drag Me Down" | One Direction | Through to Super Battle rounds |
| Super Battle rounds | "Red" | Daniel Merriweather | Through to live shows |
| Live show 1 | "Pillowtalk" | ZAYN | Saved by coach |
| Live show 2 | "Lay Me Down" | Sam Smith | Saved by public |
| Live show 3 | "I Can't Make You Love Me" | Bonnie Raitt | Bottom four |
| Semi-final (sing off) | "Alive" | Sia | Saved |
| Semi-final | "All of Me" | John Legend | Saved |
| Grand Final | "Catapult" | Jack Savoretti | Winner |
| Grand Final | "Beneath Your Beautiful" (with Delta Goodrem) | Labrinth ft. Emeli Sandé | Winner |
| Grand Final | "Cruel" | Arcuri | Winner |

Arcuri released his debut single "Cruel" immediately after. The song peaked at number 89 selling 1,458 in its first week, becoming the show's worst performing winners single to date. Arcuri's debut album Zenith was released on 29 July 2016 and peaked at number 5 on the ARIA Charts. In November, Arcuri talked about "Cruel" and its lack of success to River 949: "I love the song and it sounds so good acoustically. But I sort of had a feeling it wasn't going to do too well because I guess people on the show connected with me for certain songs and I was a ballad guy, and then I come out with this song which is a bit different. People would have connected more with a ballad but that's what I'm doing now anyway, I'm coming out with that. And that was the right way it was meant to happen." Arcuri commenced his first national tour across Australia in November 2016.

In May 2017, Arcuri released "If They Only Knew". It is a song Arcuri co-wrote, saying "When you feel heartbreak for the very first time, it's the most extreme emotion, other than being in love. I can't explain how it makes me feel that I've written it and hopefully people will connect to it the way I have."

In October 2017, Arcuri released "Love Is Love", a song in support of the "Yes" vote of the Australian Marriage Law Postal Survey. Arcuri told DNA magazine: "I wrote it for myself, my friends and the community... There has been a bit of propaganda floating around and some of my friends were feeling a bit defeated, so I wanted to write an uplifting anthem. Music has always been my escape and writing this song was very therapeutic."

=== 2019–present: Australia Decides, Golden Stag Festival and Una voce per San Marino ===
On 18 January, Arcuri released "To Myself"; a song named as an entry in the running to represent Australia at the Eurovision Song Contest 2019. In February, Arcuri performed the song at the final of Eurovision - Australia Decides, placing 5th out of 10 performers.

In August 2019, Arcuri represented Australia at the Golden Stag Festival (Romanian: Cerbul de Aur), winning the prize for the best interpretation of a Romanian song. Arcuri co-wrote "Running" with Sandro Nicolas, which was the Cypriot entry at the Eurovision Song Contest 2020.

In February 2023, Arcuri entered Una voce per San Marino in an attempt to represent San Marino at the Eurovision Song Contest 2023 with "Collide". He qualified for the final. In the same month, Arcuri announced the release of his debut EP, L.D.D. (Love Is a Dangerous Drug).

== Discography ==
=== Studio albums ===
List of studio albums, with selected details
| Title | Album details | Peak chart positions |
| Title | Album details | AUS |
|---|---|---|
| Zenith | Released: 29 July 2016; Label: Universal Music Australia; Formats: CD, digital download | 5 |

=== Extended plays ===
List of EPs, with selected details
| Title | Details |
|---|---|
| L.D.D. (Love Is a Dangerous Drug) | Released: 24 February 2023; Format: Digital; Label: King Gary |

=== Singles ===
List of singles, with selected chart positions
| Title | Year | Peak chart positions | Album |
| Title | Year | AUS | Album |
|---|---|---|---|
| "Cruel" | 2016 | 89 | Zenith |
| "If They Only Knew" | 2017 | 96 | Non-album singles |
| "Love Is Love" | 2017 | — | Non-album singles |
| "To Myself" | 2019 | — | Non-album singles |
| "Same" | 2019 | — | Non-album singles |
| "Buona Sera" (with Gran Error) | 2020 | — | Non-album singles |
| "Handsome Man" (with Cam Nacson) | 2021 | — | Non-album singles |
| "Devils Lips" | 2021 | — | L.D.D. (Love Is a Dangerous Drug) |
| "Overtime" | 2022 | — | L.D.D. (Love Is a Dangerous Drug) |
| "Happy" | 2024 | — | Non-album single |
| "Lost" (with Eliad Cohen) | 2025 | — | Non-album single |
"—" denotes a recording that did not chart or was not released in that territory.

| Preceded by Ellie Drennan | The Voice winner 2016 | Succeeded by Judah Kelly |
