= If They Only Knew =

If They Only Knew may refer to:

- If They Only Knew (Trip Lee album), 2006
- If They Only Knew (Dave Liebman album), 1981
- "If They Only Knew" (song), a 2017 song by Alfie Arcuri
