= Running (Sandro song) =

2020 single by Sandro Nicolas

Single by Sandro
- Released: 7 March 2020
- Genre: Dance-pop
- Length: 3:02
- Label: Panik
- Songwriters: Sandro Nicolas; Alfie Arcuri; Octavian Rasinariu; Sebastian Metzner Rickards; Teo DK

Sandro singles chronology
"In My Blood" (2019)	"Running" (2020)	"Two for the Show" (2020)

Eurovision Song Contest 2020 entry
- Country: Cyprus
- Artist: Sandro
- Language: English
- Composers: Sandro Nicolas; Alfie Arcuri; Sebastian Metzner Rickards; Octavian Rasinariu; Teo DK
- Lyricists: Sandro Nicolas; Alfie Arcuri; Sebastian Metzner Rickards; Octavian Rasinariu

Finals performance
- Semi-final result: Contest cancelled

Entry chronology
- ◄ "Replay" (2019)
- "El Diablo" (2021) ►

"Running" is a song recorded by Greek-German singer Sandro. Released on 7 March 2020, the song was written by Sandro, Alfie Arcuri, Sebastian Rickards, Octavian Rasinariu, and Teo DK. It was planned to represent Cyprus in the Eurovision Song Contest 2020 in Rotterdam, the Netherlands, after being selected by the national broadcaster Cyprus Broadcasting Corporation. However, the contest was later cancelled due to the COVID-19 pandemic.

Described as a dance-pop song, the lyrics of "Running" encourage people to stand up and fight against their problems. Critical reception of the song was mixed, with several reviewers referring to the song as "average". To promote the song, an accompanying music video was released, as well as an unplugged acoustic version. Sandro performed the song live in both Sweden and Romania in preparation for his Eurovision appearance.

== Background and composition ==
On 29 November 2019, Sandro was announced as the Cypriot entrant for the Eurovision Song Contest 2020 after being internally selected by the Cyprus Broadcasting Corporation (CyBC). "Running" was then revealed as the name of his selected song on 11 February 2020 through a post on Instagram. It was written by Sandro and Australian singer-songwriter Alfie Arcuri with a team also consisting of Sebastian Rickards, Octavian Rasinariu, and Teo DK. Sandro described the song as "something that comes straight from the heart". "A dark story that showcases the struggle against adversity and the storms we have to weather in life," he elaborated. CyBC noted that "having gone through depression himself, Sandro's performance underlines the tunnel of darkness that we must keep on running through in difficulties or catastrophes but also of the strength needed to stand tall and not fall". Summarily, the song describes how young people need to stand up and fight against their problems.

The song and its music video premiered on 6 March 2020 during CyBC's show Happy Hour. Robyn Gallagher of Wiwibloggs described it as a "deep-house style electro-pop song, with solid beats underscoring Sandro's vocals", while Star Channel referred to it as dynamic dance-pop anthem with rebellious beats that showcased Sandro's vocals. It was released as a single on 7 March 2020 for download and streaming, and was followed by the release of an acoustic version on 13 April 2020.

== Critical reception ==
Upon its release, the songs received mixed reviews from music critics. Jonathan Currinn of CelebMix referred to the song as "generic pop" that would be "perfect for radio play". In a Wiwibloggs review containing several reviews from individual critics, the song was given a score of 5.9 out of 10 points. The reviewers noted that the song was average and "middle-of-the-road", though still a contemporary danceable pop song. Contributing writers for EuroVisionary echoed that sentiment, with Josef Štaif calling the track "a good average dance pop track. Not bad, but not great either". William Savage closed the review by summarizing their remarks as "not overly positive", though he anticipated the song could still qualify for the Eurovision final.

== Music video and promotion ==
To promote the song, a music video directed by Alexandros Kostelidis was released at the time of the song's premiere, on 6 March 2020. It was shown during CyBC's Happy Hour show and also became available on record label Panik's YouTube channel the same day. The video shows Sandro wearing all black, surrounded by darkness with occasional holograms of flames and landscapes cast on his outfit. There are periods where he appears to be restrained by plastic wrapped around him. Robyn Gallagher of Wiwibloggs described it as a "simple scenario" that "starts in black and white but introduces more colour tones, bringing different feelings as the song progresses". In late April, a second video was released, featuring an unplugged acoustic version of the song, in which Sandro sings with a guitar in a dimly lit studio setting.

Sandro visited a number of countries that were to participate in the Eurovision Song Contest to promote his song. The first live performance of "Running" was at Melfest WKND 20, a pre-party in Stockholm that took place the night before Melodifestivalen 2020, the selection process for Sweden in the Eurovision Song Contest. The song was also performed at Selecția Națională 2020, Romania's selection process for the contest. On 1 May, Sandro performed "Running" on an episode of Eurovision Home Concerts, a weekly online show organised by the European Broadcasting Union showcasing Eurovision contestants.

== Eurovision Song Contest ==
The Eurovision Song Contest 2020 was originally scheduled to take place at Rotterdam Ahoy in Rotterdam, Netherlands and consist of two semi-finals on 12 and 14 May, and a final on 16 May 2020. According to Eurovision rules, each country, except the host nation and the "Big Five" (France, Germany, Italy, Spain and the United Kingdom), would have been required to qualify from one of two semi-finals to compete for the final; the top ten countries from each semi-final would have progressed to the final. On 28 January 2020, the allocation draw was held, placing Cyprus into the second half of the first semi-final. Marvin Dietmann was announced as the artistic director for the entry, charged with staging Sandro's performance. However, due to the COVID-19 pandemic in Europe, the contest was cancelled on 18 March 2020. The EBU announced soon after that entries intended for 2020 would not be eligible for the following year, though each broadcaster would be able to send either their 2020 representative or a new one. On 1 June, CyBC announced through its social media accounts that Sandro would not return for the 2021 contest.

=== Alternative song contests ===
Some of the broadcasters scheduled to take part in the Eurovision Song Contest 2020 organised alternative competitions. Austria's ORF aired Der kleine Song Contest in April 2020, which saw every entry being assigned to one of three semi-finals. A jury consisting of ten singers that had represented Austria at Eurovision before was hired to rank each song; the best-placed in each semi-final advanced to the final round. In the first semi-final on 14 April, "Running" placed tenth in a field of 14 participants, achieving 50 points. The song participated in Sveriges Television's Sveriges 12:a in May, though it was eliminated in the qualifying round.

== Track listing ==
- Digital download
1. "Running" – 3:02
- Digital download – Acoustic Version
1. "Running" (Acoustic Version) – 3:33

== Release history ==
Region	Date	Format	Label	Ref.
Various	7 March 2020	Digital download; streaming	Panik	
Various	13 April 2020	Acoustic Version: Digital download; streaming	Panik	
