= Roger Cicero discography =

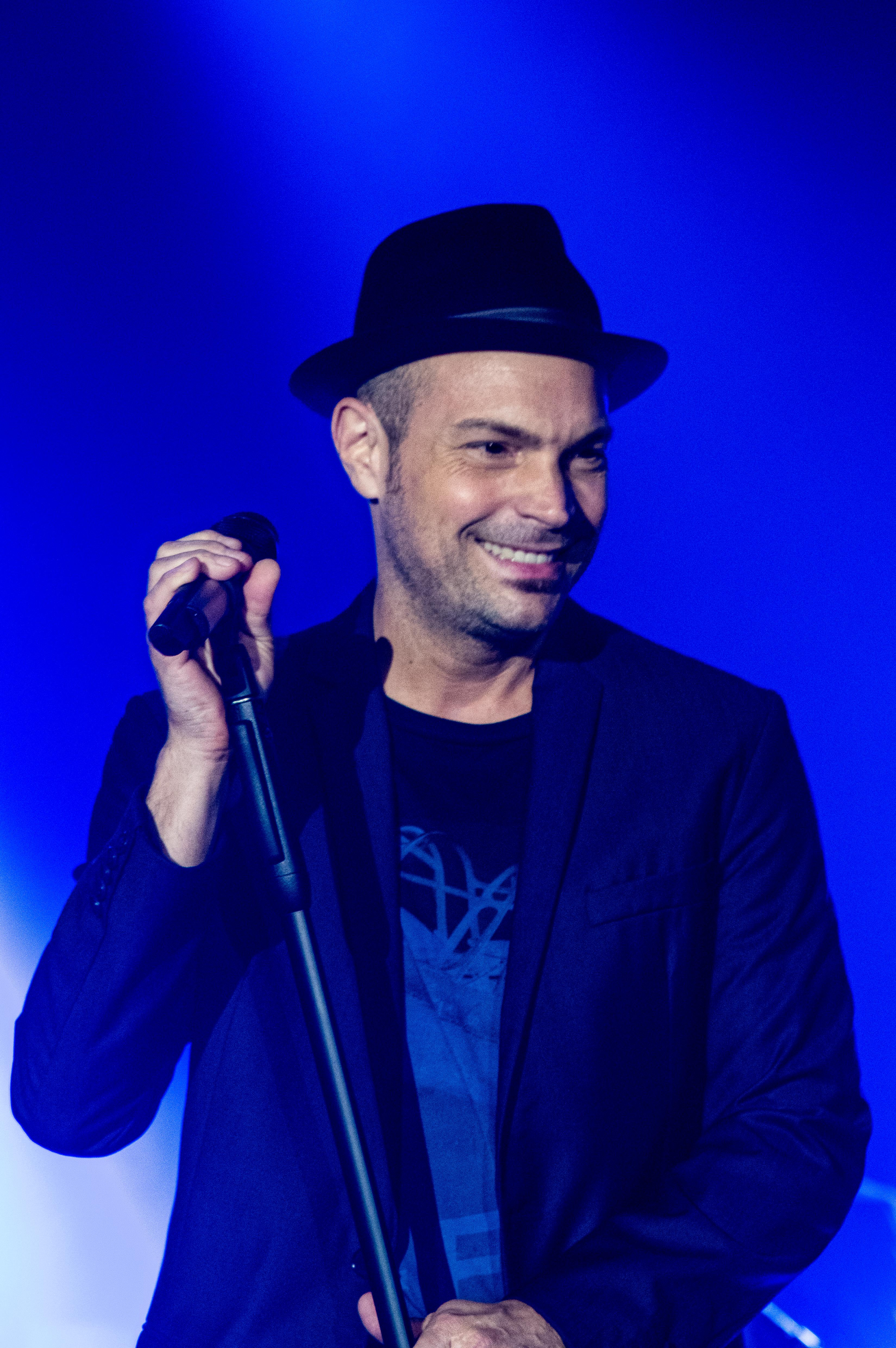
- Cicero at the Das Zelt festival in Freiburg im Breisgau in 2014.
- Studio albums: 8
- Live albums: 1
- Compilation albums: 1

== Albums ==
=== Studio albums ===
List of albums, with selected chart positions and certifications
Title	Album details	Peak chart positions			Certifications
Title	Album details	GER	AUT	SWI	Certifications
There I Go (with After Hours)	Released: November 25, 2005; Label: Jazzsick; Formats: CD, digital download	—	—	—	
Good Morning Midnight (with Julia Hülsmann Trio)	Released: January 27, 2006; Label: Jazzsick; Formats: CD, digital download	—	—	—	
Männersachen	Released: May 26, 2006; Label: Starwatch/Warner; Formats: CD, digital download	3	23	40	AUT: Gold; GER: 3× Platinum
Beziehungsweise	Released: October 12, 2007; Label: Starwatch/Warner; Formats: CD, digital download	2	7	17	AUT: Gold; GER: 3× Gold
Artgerecht	Released: April 3, 2009; Label: Starwatch/Warner; Formats: CD, digital download	2	4	8	GER: Platinum
In diesem Moment	Released: October 28, 2011; Label: Starwatch/Warner; Formats: CD, digital download	4	8	18	GER: Gold
Was immer auch kommt	Released: March 28, 2014; Label: Starwatch/Warner; Formats: CD, digital download	4	3	11	
The Roger Cicero Jazz Experience	Released: October 2, 2015; Label: Wavemusic; Formats: CD, digital download	27	29	79	

=== Live albums ===
List of albums, with selected chart positions and certifications
Title	Album details	Peak chart positions			Certifications
Title	Album details	GER	AUT	SWI	Certifications
Cicero Sings Sinatra – Live in Hamburg	Released: November 27, 2015; Label: RCA; Formats: CD, digital download	4	4	17	

=== Compilation albums ===
List of albums, with selected chart positions and certifications
Title	Album details	Peak chart positions			Certifications
Title	Album details	GER	AUT	SWI	Certifications
Männersachen / Beziehungsweise	Released: August 31, 2012; Label: Starwatch/Warner; Formats: CD, digital download	86	—	—	
Glück ist leicht - Das Beste von 2006-2016	Released: March 17, 2017; Label: Starwatch/Warner; Formats: CD, digital download	4	4	12	

== Singles ==
- 2006: "Zieh die Schuh aus" (GER #71)
- 2006: "So geil Berlin"
- 2006: "Ich atme ein" (GER #74)
- 2006: "Murphys Gesetz" (Promo Single)
- 2007: "Frauen regier'n die Welt" (GER #7, AUT #51, SWI #64)
- 2007: "Guess who rules the world" (Online Single)
- 2007: "Die Liste"
- 2007: "Bin heute Abend bei dir" (Online Single)
- 2008: "Wovon träumst du nachts?" (Online Single)
- 2008: "Alle Möbel verrückt" live
- 2009: "Nicht Artgerecht"
- 2009: "Seine Ruhe"
- 2010: "Tabu"
- 2011: "In Diesem Moment"
- 2012: "Für nichts auf dieser Welt"
- 2014: "Wenn es morgen schon zu Ende wär'"
- 2014: "Du bist mein Sommer"
- 2017: "Eine Nummer zu groß"

== DVDs ==
- 2007: Roger Cicero: Männersachen Live! (Recorded on February 18, 2007, in Frankfurt/Main)
- 2008: Roger Cicero - Beziehungsweise Live (Recorded on February 13, 2008, in Berlin)
- 2010: Roger Cicero - Live at Montreux 2010 (Recorded on July 12, 2010, at the Montreux Jazz Festival)
- 2015: Roger Cicero - Cicero Sings Sinatra - Live in Hamburg (Recorded on September 7–8, 2015 in Hamburg)
