= Cruel (Alfie Arcuri song) =

Single by Alfie Arcuri

from the album Zenith
- Released: 10 July 2016
- Recorded: 2016
- Genre: Pop
- Length: 3:36
- Label: Universal Music Australia
- Songwriters: Alexander Izquierdo; James Abrahart; Serm Style; Jonathan "J.R." Rotem; Lindy Robbins
- Producers: Eric J. Dubowsky; Dave Hammer

Alfie Arcuri singles chronology
"Cruel" (2016)	"If They Only Knew" (2017)

Music video
- "Cruel" on YouTube

"Cruel" is the debut and winner's single by season five winner of The Voice Australia, Alfie Arcuri. It was released digitally immediately after he was announced the winner on 10 July 2016, as the lead single from his debut studio album Zenith. The song peaked at number 89 on the ARIA Singles Chart, selling 1,458 in its first week, becoming the show's worst performing winner's single to date.

Lynnette Guzman from Australian Network News believes "music insiders considered the likely mismatch of Arcuri's singing style with the pop song as the problem."

The music video was released on 18 August 2016.

== Reception ==
David Knox from TV Tonight questioned "Who on earth decided Alfie Arcuri should be releasing an up-tempo single "Cruel" as his first single?...with viewers voted him through on the back of Sam Smith-style ballads for much of the season", calling Arcuri "a fine vocalist".

Paul Cashmere from Noise11 felt that the song "was a complete disaster and makes a mockery of a show promoted to be about music".

== Charts ==
"Cruel" debuted on the ARIA Singles Chart at number 89 with 1,458 sales. In its second week, the song fell to number 298 with 482 sales.

Chart performance for "Cruel"
Chart (2016)	Peak position
Australian (ARIA)	89
