= The Voice of Germany season 8 =

The Voice of Germany
- Season 8
- Promotional poster featuring coaches Kelly, Forster, Michi & Smudo, and Catterfeld
- Hosted by: Thore Schölermann; Lena Gercke
- Coaches: Michael Patrick Kelly; Michi & Smudo; Yvonne Catterfeld; Mark Forster
- Winner: Samuel Rösch
- Winning coach: Michael Patrick Kelly
- Runner-up: Benjamin Dolic

Release
- Original network: ProSieben; Sat.1
- Original release: October 18 – December 16, 2018

Season chronology
- ← Previous; Season 7 Next → Season 9

The eighth season of the talent show The Voice of Germany premiered on October 18, 2018 on ProSieben and on October 21, 2018 on Sat.1. Michi & Smudo, Yvonne Catterfeld and Mark Forster returned for their fifth, third and second seasons respectively. Michael Patrick Kelly was declared as the new coach, joining the show for the first time, replacing Samu Haber. Both hosts returned Thore Schölermann returning for his seventh season and Lena Gercke returning for her fourth season.

On December 16, 2018, Samuel Rösch was crowned the winner of The Voice of Germany 2018, marking Michael Patrick Kelly's first and only win as a coach.

== Coaches and hosts ==
The Voice of Germany season 8 coaches

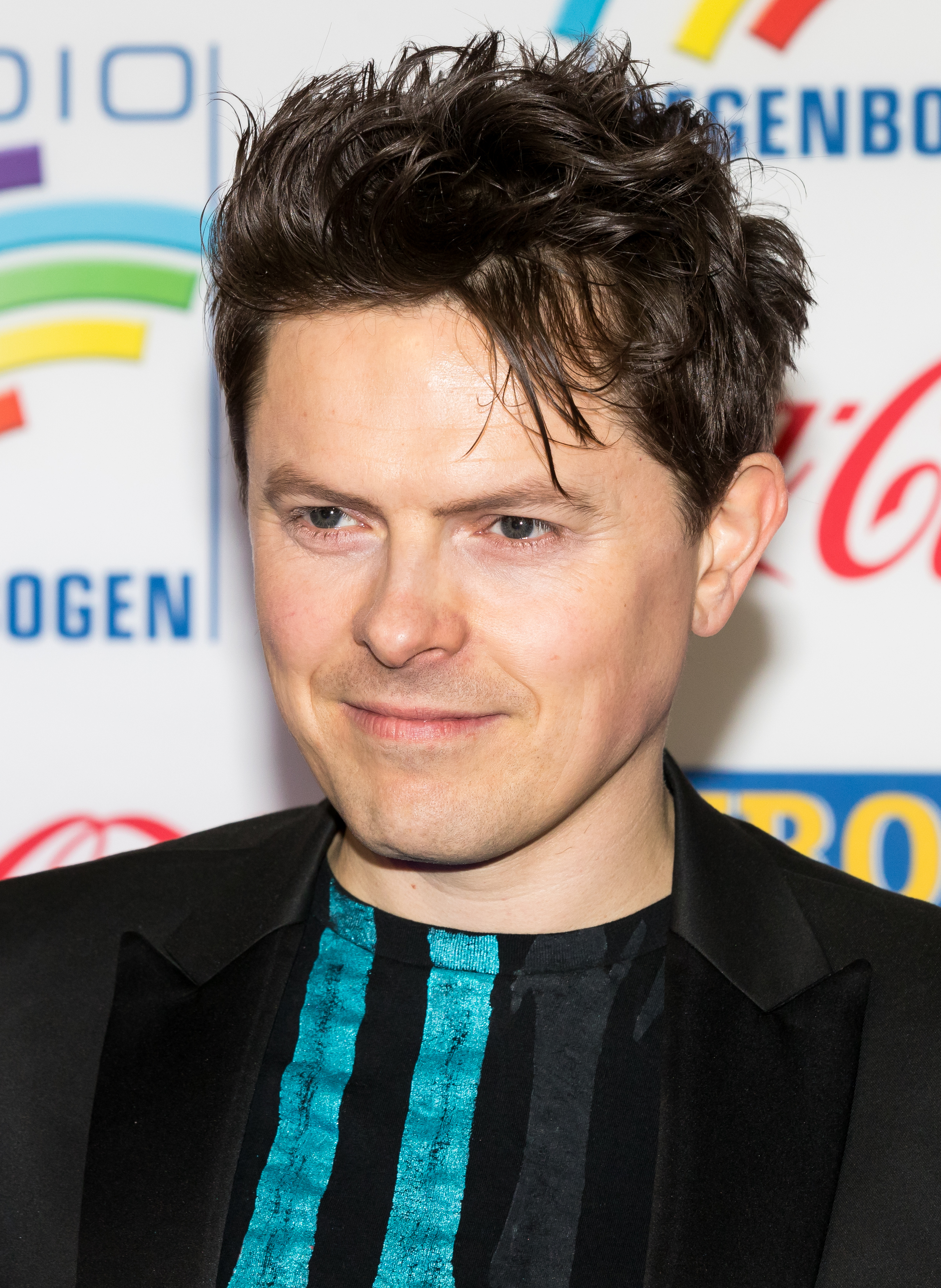
Michael Patrick Kelly

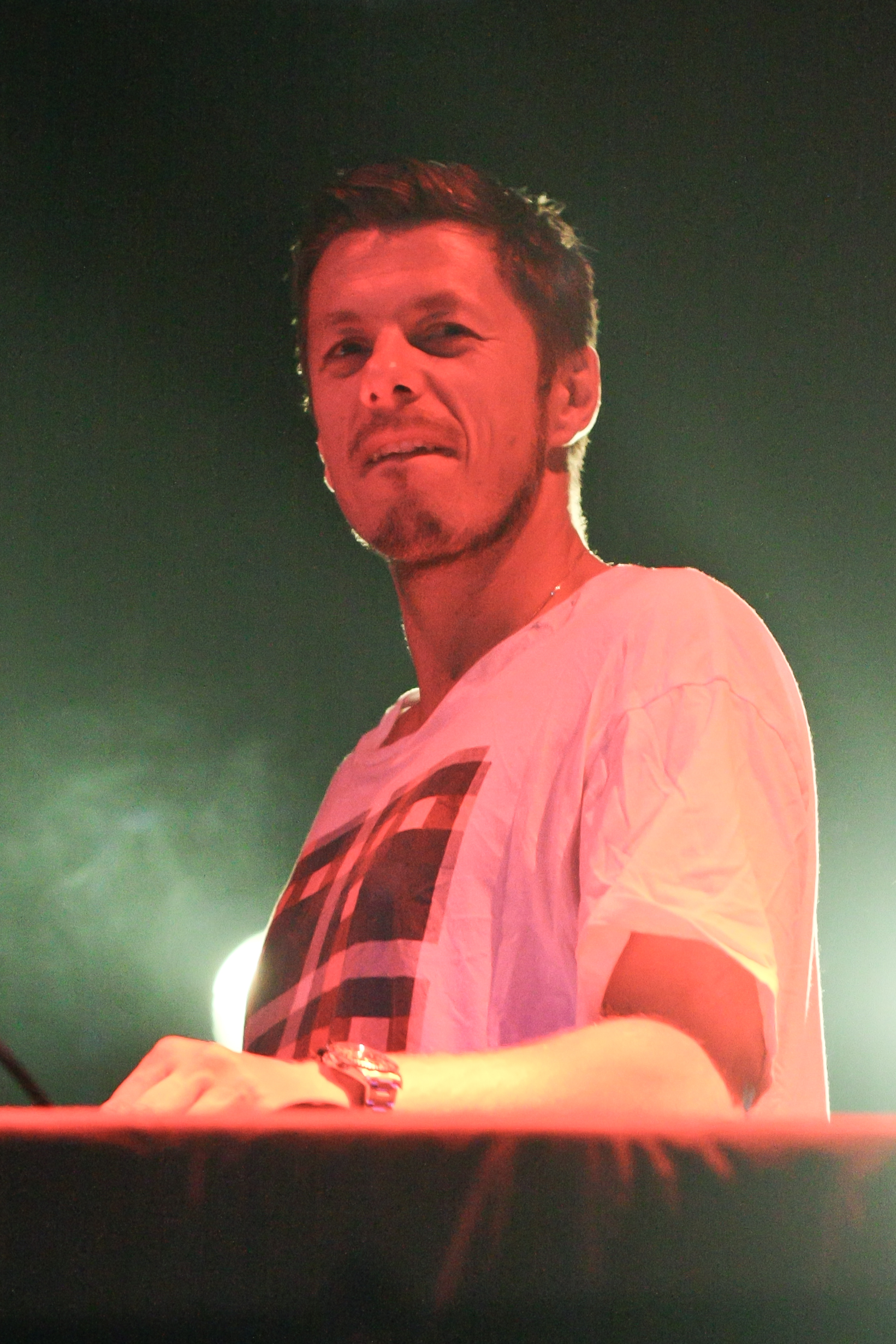
Michi

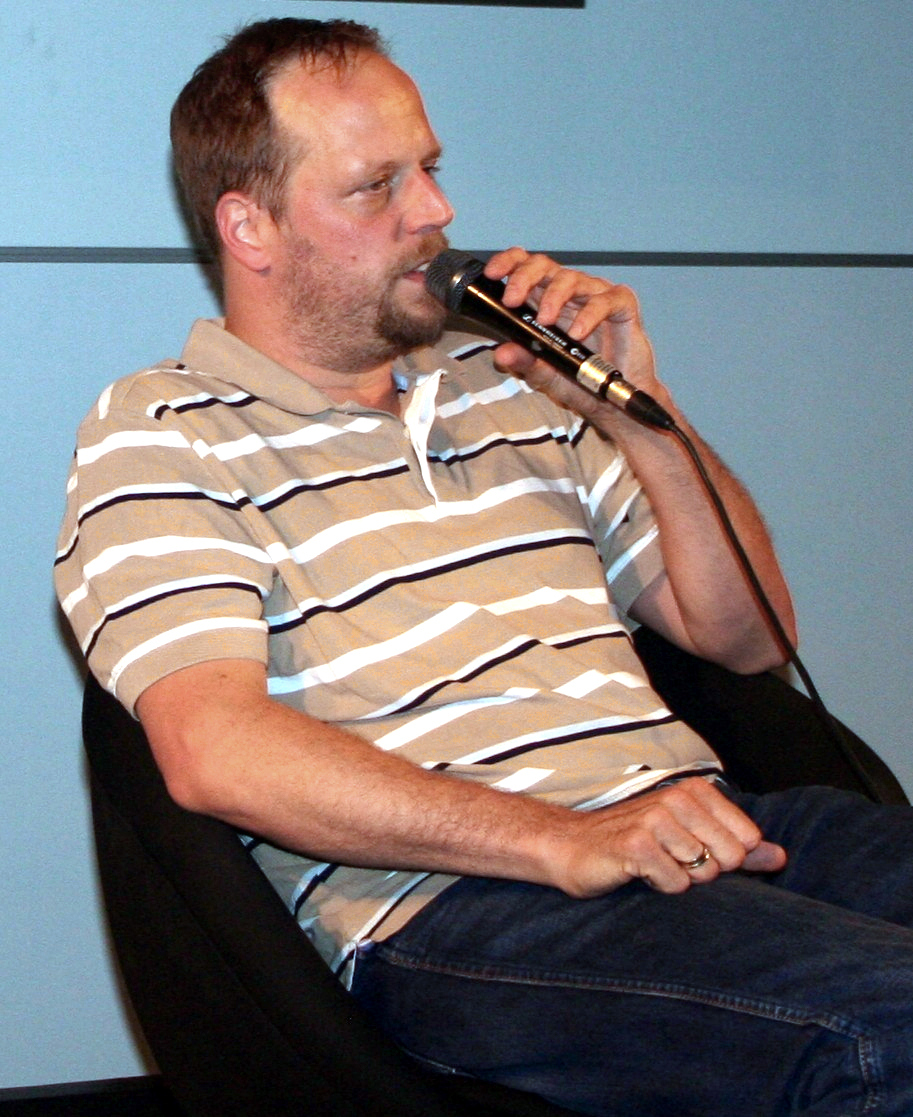
Smudo

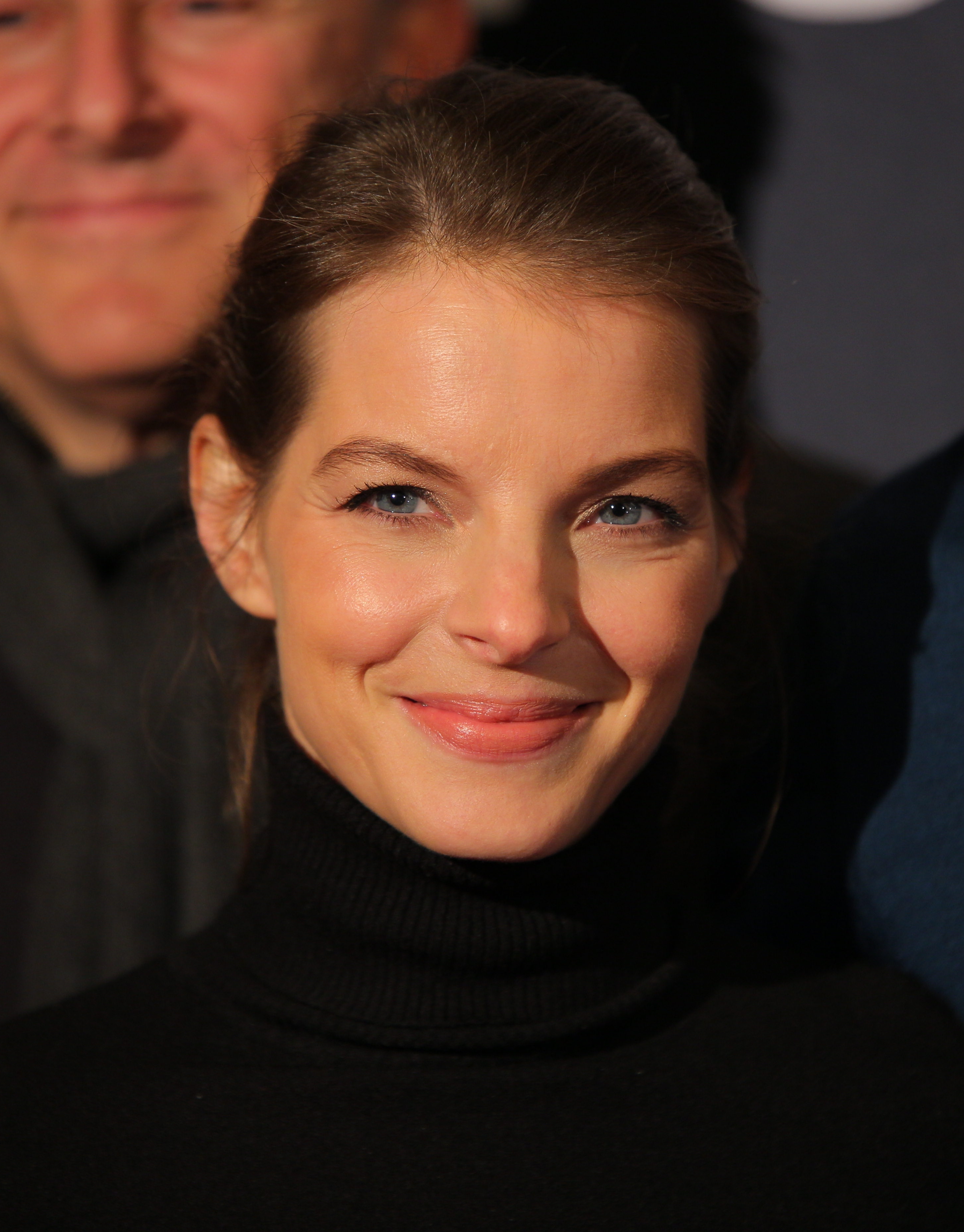
Yvonne Catterfeld

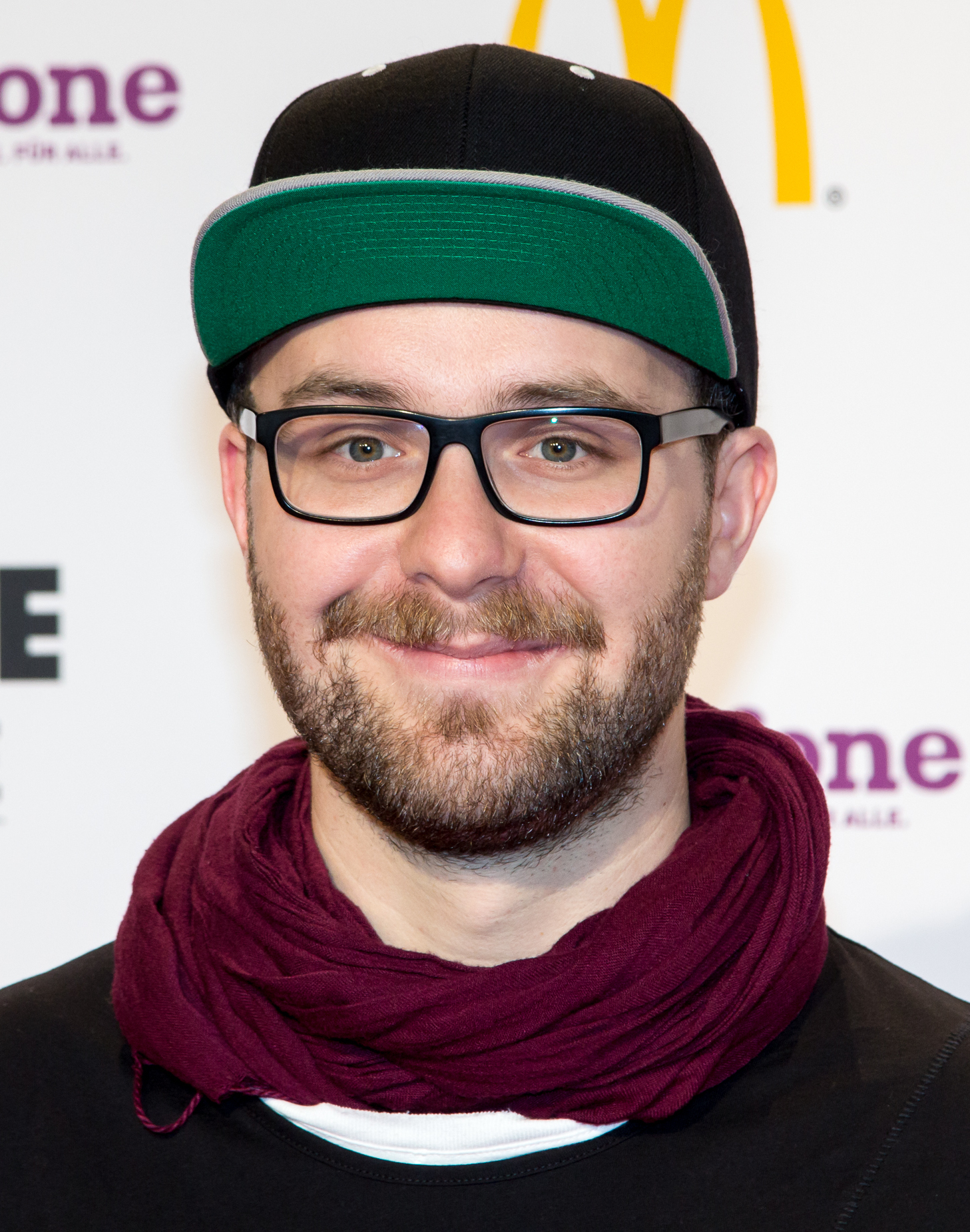
Mark Forster

On May 19, 2018, it was announced that after 2 years Samu Haber would not be returning to the show. On June 20, 2018, it was announced that Haber was replaced by new coach Michael Patrick Kelly and returning coaches Michi & Smudo, Yvonne Catterfeld and Mark Forster.

Thore Schölermann and Lena Gercke both returned as hosts.

== Teams ==
Colour key:

- Winner
- Runner-up
- Third place
- Fourth place
- Eliminated in the Semi-final
- Eliminated in the Sing Off
- Stolen in the Battle rounds
- Eliminated in the Battles rounds
- Withdrew

Coach	Top 76 Artists				
Michael Patrick Kelly					
Michael Patrick Kelly	Samuel Rösch	Bernarda Brunović	Matthias Nebel	Chantal Dorn	Sümeyra Stahl
Michael Patrick Kelly	Liam Blaney	Monica Lewis-Schmidt	Ludmila Larusso	Guido Goh	Maria Pasqua Casti
Michael Patrick Kelly	~~Laura Neels~~	Mario Geckeler	Fabian Riaz	Jélila Bouraoui	Philipp von Unold
Michael Patrick Kelly	Samuele Di Dio	Lena Rotermund	Amanda Lena Jakucs	Gaby Schwager	Taylor Shore
Michi & Smudo					
Michi & Smudo	Eros Atomus Isler	Coby Grant	Clifford Dwenger	Sascha Coles	Jeanie Celina Schultheiß
Michi & Smudo	Eun Chae Rhee	Fabrice Richter-Reichhelm	Kaye-Ree	Alexander Eder	Lia Joham
Michi & Smudo	~~Malin Lewis~~	Sebastian Stipp	Cem Kücük	Seda Acar	Mascha Winkels
Michi & Smudo	Felicia Peters	Igor Quennehen	Steffen Frommberger	Kinga Noémi Balla	Karina Klüber
Yvonne Catterfeld					
Yvonne Catterfeld	Benjamin Dolic	Linda Alkhodor	James Smith Jr.	Nora Brandenburger	Hugo Gonzalez Morales
Yvonne Catterfeld	Andreas Hauser	Malin Lewis	Flavio Baltermia	Patrice Gerlach	Giuliano De Stefano
Yvonne Catterfeld	~~Sascha Coles~~	~~Chantal Dorn~~	Mattis Laustroer	Florian Alexander Kurz	Luka Nozza
Yvonne Catterfeld	Stefan Celar	Abdullah Azad	Doriane Kamdem Mabou	Juliane Götz	Shireen Nikolic
Mark Forster					
Mark Forster	Jessica Schaffler	Diana Babalola	Rahel Maas	Damiano Maiolini	Misses Melaza
Mark Forster	Felicitas Mayer	Laura Neels	Dominik Hartz	Kira Mesterheide	Alessandro Rütten
Mark Forster	Alexandre Heitz	Melissa Muamba	Sinem Uraz	John Alexander Garner III	Penni Jo Blatterman
Mark Forster	Lars Kamphausen	Debora Vater	Johannes Holfeld	Judith Jandl	Mark Agpas
Note: Italicized names are stolen artists (names struck through within former teams).

== Blind Auditions ==
=== Episode 1 (October 18) ===
Order	Artist	Song	Coach's and artist's choices			
Order	Artist	Song	Michael Patrick	Michi and Smudo	Yvonne	Mark
1	Alessandro Rütten	"In My Blood (Shawn Mendes song)"	✔	✔	✔	✔
2	Sümeyra Stahl	"Shake Away"	✔	–	–	✔
3	Matthias Nebel	"Bed of Roses"	✔	✔	✔	✔
4	Samantha Krug	"For You"	–	–	–	–
5	Nora Brandenburger	"One Night Only (song)"	–	✔	✔	✔
6	Alexander Eder	"Your Man"	–	✔	–	✔
7	Eva Kaufmann	"Ohne dich schlaf ich heut Nacht nicht ein"	–	–	–	–
8	Gaby Schwager	"Scarborough Fair (ballad)"	✔	✔	–	✔
9	Coby Grant	"Leaving on a Jet Plane"	✔	✔	✔	✔

=== Episode 3 (October 25) ===
Order	Artist	Song	Coach's and artist's choices			
Order	Artist	Song	Michael Patrick	Michi and Smudo	Yvonne	Mark
1	Judith Jandl	"License to Kill"	✔	✔	✔	✔
2	James Smith Jr.	"Finesse"	✔	–	✔	✔
3	Christina Lindner	"Dude Looks Like a Lady"	–	–	–	–
4	Fabian Riaz	"You Let Me Walk Alone"	✔	✔	✔	✔
5	Seda Acar	"Fell in Love with a Boy"	–	✔	✔	–
6	Alexandre Heitz	"Papaoutai"	–	✔	✔	✔
7	Clifford Dwenger	"You Can Do It"	✔	✔	✔	✔
8	Kendra Pilling	"IDGAF"	–	–	–	–
9	Melissa Muamba	"I Would Die 4 U"	✔	–	✔	✔
10	Mario Nowack	"Real to Me"	–	–	–	–
11	Eros Atomus Isler	"Bette Davis Eyes"	–	✔	–	✔

=== Episode 5 (November 1) ===
Order	Artist	Age	Song	Coach's and artist's choices			
Order	Artist	Age	Song	Michael Patrick	Michi & Smudo	Yvonne	Mark
1	Philipp von Unold	22	"Supermarket Flowers"	✔	–	✔	–
2	Kathrin Kay-Ree	39	"Is This Love"	✔	✔	✔	✔
3	Kira Mesterheide	22	"The Drugs Don't Work"	–	–	✔	✔
4	Philipp Fixmer	30	"Paradize"	–	–	–	–
5	Benjamin Dolic	21	"No Tears Left To Cry"	–	–	✔	✔
6	Eun Chae Rhee	23	"Gangnam Style"	–	✔	–	✔
7	Sirio Meier	20	"Jenny Don't Be Hasty"	–	–	–	–
8	Damiano Maiolino	27	"You Are The Reason"	✔	–	–	✔
9	Ute Spiegel	50	"Heart of Stone"	–	–	–	–
10	Mark Agpas	38	"Come Together"	✔	✔	✔	✔

=== Episode 8 (November 11) ===
Order	Artist	Song	Coach's and artist's choices			
Order	Artist	Song	Michael Patrick	Michi and Smudo	Yvonne	Mark
1	Debora Vater	"Can't Fight This Feeling"	✔	✔	✔	✔
2	Taylor Shore	"Incomplete"	✔	–	–	✔
3	Alina Kubina	"I Miss You"	–	–	–	–
4	Fabrice Richter-Reichhelm	"Weltwunder"	–	✔	–	✔
5	Maria Pasqua Casti	"The Middle"	✔	–	–	✔
6	Chantal Dorn	"You Are So Beautiful"	–	✔	✔	–
7	Luana Jil Kälin	"Steady As She Goes"	–	–	–	–
8	Lars Kamphausen	"Traum"	–	✔	–	✔
9	Susanne Czech	"Water Under the Bridge"	–	–	–	–
10	Luka Nozza	"Just For Tonight"	–	–	✔	–
11	Hugo Gonzalez Morales	"Rush"	✔	–	✔	–
12	Kevin Owen	"Whataya Want from Me"	–	–	–	–
13	Sinem Uraz	"Isyan"	✔	✔	✔	✔

== Sing Off ==
The Sing Off determines which three artists from each team will advance to the final round of competition, the Semi Final. In this round, after an artist performs, he or she will sit in one of three seats above the stage. The first three artists performing from each team will sit down, but once the fourth artist performs, a coach has the choice of replacing the fourth artist with any artist sitting down or eliminating them immediately. Once all artists have performed, those who remain seated will advance to the Semi Final. The two Sing Off episodes was broadcast on 2 and 6 December.

Color key
– Contestant was eliminated, either immediately or switched with another contestant
– Contestant was not switched out and advanced to the Semi-final

Episode	Coach	Order	Artist	Song	Result
Episode 14 (December 2)	Michi & Smudo	1	Lia Joham	"Believer"	Eliminated
Episode 14 (December 2)	Michi & Smudo	2	Alexander Eder	"Ring of Fire"	Eliminated
Episode 14 (December 2)	Michi & Smudo	3	Kaye-Ree	"Grenade"	Eliminated
Episode 14 (December 2)	Michi & Smudo	4	Fabrice Richter-Reichhelm	"Keinen Zentimeter"	Eliminated
Episode 14 (December 2)	Michi & Smudo	5	Eun Chae Rhee	"Toxic"	Eliminated
Episode 14 (December 2)	Michi & Smudo	6	Eros Atomus Isler	"Roxanne"	Advanced
Episode 14 (December 2)	Michi & Smudo	7	Jeanie Celina Schultheiß	"Genie in a Bottle"	Eliminated
Episode 14 (December 2)	Michi & Smudo	8	Sascha Coles	"Breaking the Habit"	Eliminated
Episode 14 (December 2)	Michi & Smudo	9	Coby Grant	"I Wanna Dance with Somebody (Who Loves Me)"	Advanced
Episode 14 (December 2)	Michi & Smudo	10	Clifford Dwenger	"Niggas in Paris"	Advanced
Episode 14 (December 2)	Mark	1	Alessandro Rütten	"Hotter than Hell"	Eliminated
Episode 14 (December 2)	Mark	2	Kira Mesterheide	"Jealous"	Eliminated
Episode 14 (December 2)	Mark	3	Dominik Hartz	"Bye Bye"	Eliminated
Episode 14 (December 2)	Mark	4	Jessica Schaffler	"Human"	Advanced
Episode 14 (December 2)	Mark	5	Laura Neels	"Don't Leave Me Alone"	Eliminated
Episode 14 (December 2)	Mark	6	Rahel Maas	"Zu Dir"	Advanced
Episode 14 (December 2)	Mark	7	Damiano Maiolini	"She Said"	Eliminated
Episode 14 (December 2)	Mark	8	Diana Babalola	"Nutbush City Limits"	Advanced
Episode 14 (December 2)	Mark	9	Felicitas Mayer	"If I Wasn't Your Daughter"	Eliminated
Episode 14 (December 2)	Mark	10	Misses Melaza	"Despacito"	Eliminated
Episode 15 (December 6)	Michael Patrick	1	Guido Goh	"With or Without You"	Eliminated
Episode 15 (December 6)	Michael Patrick	2	Maria Pasqua Casti	"Happy Now"	Eliminated
Episode 15 (December 6)	Michael Patrick	3	Monica Lewis-Schmidt	"Ain't Nobody"	Eliminated
Episode 15 (December 6)	Michael Patrick	4	Liam Blaney	"Shotgun"	Eliminated
Episode 15 (December 6)	Michael Patrick	5	Ludmila Larusso	"Who Wants to Live Forever"	Eliminated
Episode 15 (December 6)	Michael Patrick	6	Samuel Rösch	"Auf anderen Wegen"	Advanced
Episode 15 (December 6)	Michael Patrick	7	Sümeyra Stahl	"No Roots"	Eliminated
Episode 15 (December 6)	Michael Patrick	8	Matthias Nebel	"Breakeven"	Advanced
Episode 15 (December 6)	Michael Patrick	9	Chantal Dorn	"Lovesong"	Eliminated
Episode 15 (December 6)	Michael Patrick	10	Bernarda Brunovic	"Lady Marmalade"	Advanced
Episode 15 (December 6)	Yvonne	1	Giuliano De Stefano	"It's a Man's Man's Man's World"	Eliminated
Episode 15 (December 6)	Yvonne	2	Patrice Gerlach	"Bubbly"	Eliminated
Episode 15 (December 6)	Yvonne	3	Linda Alkhodor	"Tell Me You Love Me"	Advanced
Episode 15 (December 6)	Yvonne	4	James Smith Jr.	"Earned It"	Advanced
Episode 15 (December 6)	Yvonne	5	Flavio Baltermia	"I'm All Over It"	Eliminated
Episode 15 (December 6)	Yvonne	6	Malin Lewis	"Brand New Me"	Eliminated
Episode 15 (December 6)	Yvonne	7	Andreas Hauser	"Summer Is A Curse"	Eliminated
Episode 15 (December 6)	Yvonne	8	Benjamin Dolic	"Stay"	Advanced
Episode 15 (December 6)	Yvonne	9	Hugo Gonzalez Morales	"XO"	Eliminated
Episode 15 (December 6)	Yvonne	10	Nora Brandenburger	"When We Were Young"	Eliminated

== Live Shows ==
=== Week 1: Semifinals (December 9) ===
The semi final aired on December 9, 2018 – with three acts from each team performing. The public chose one artist from each team to advance to the final.

- Group performance: Rita Ora and Top 12 - "Let You Love Me"

Order	Coach	Artist	Song	Voting	Result
1	Mark Forster	Diana Babalola	"Crazy"	16,7%	Eliminated
2	Mark Forster	Rahel Maas	"Schön Genug"	26,2%	Eliminated
3	Mark Forster	Jessica Schaffler	"Head Above Water"	56,1%	Advanced
4	Michi Beck & Smudo	Eros Atomus Isler	"Another Love"	37,6%	Advanced
5	Michi Beck & Smudo	Clifford Dwenger	"California Love"	31,0%	Eliminated
6	Michi Beck & Smudo	Coby Grant	"Let It Go"	31,4%	Eliminated
7	Yvonne Catterfeld	James Smith Jr.	"Summer Love"	9,9%	Eliminated
8	Yvonne Catterfeld	Linda Alkhodor	"Scars to Your Beautiful"	31,6%	Eliminated
9	Yvonne Catterfeld	Benjamin Dolic	"Can't Help Falling in Love"	58,5%	Advanced
10	Michael Patrick Kelly	Matthias Nebel	"Wrecking Ball"	19,8%	Eliminated
11	Michael Patrick Kelly	Samuel Rösch	"Der Weg"	47,0%	Advanced
12	Michael Patrick Kelly	Bernarda Brunovic	"Free Your Mind"	33,2%	Eliminated

=== Week 2: Finale (December 16) ===
The final aired on December 16, 2018 – with one artist from each team performing.

Coach	Artist	Order	Solo Song	Order	Duet Song (with coach)	Order	Duet Song (with special guest)	Voting	Result
Mark Forster	Jessica Schaffler	5	"A Million Dreams"	9	"Einmal"	1	"Half Good As You" (with Tom Odell)	14.99%	Third place
Michi Beck & Smudo	Eros Atomus Isler	7	"Fly Me To The Moon"	2	"Zusammen"	11	"Thursday" (with Jess Glynne)	13.52%	Fourth place
Michael Patrick Kelly	Samuel Rösch	3	"In Diesem Moment"	6	"Auf Uns"	10	"Love Someone" (with Lukas Graham)	54.89%	Winner
Yvonne Catterfeld	Benjamin Dolic	12	"She's Out of My Life"	4	"Creep"	8	"Ruin My Life" (with Zara Larsson)	16.60%	Runner-up

== Elimination Chart ==
=== Overall ===
Color key
Artist's info

- Artist from Team Michael Patrick
- Artist from Team Michi & Smudo
- Artist from Team Yvonne
- Artist from Team Mark

Result details

- Winner
- Runner-up
- Third place
- Fourth place
- Artist was saved by the public vote
- Artist was eliminated

Live show results per week
Artist	Week 1	Week 2 Finale
Samuel Rösch	Safe	Winner
Benjamin Dolic	Safe	Runner-up
Jessica Schaffler	Safe	3rd Place
Eros Atomus Isler	Safe	4th Place
Bernarda Brunović	Eliminated	Eliminated (Semi Final)
Matthias Nebel	Eliminated	Eliminated (Semi Final)
Linda Alkhodor	Eliminated	Eliminated (Semi Final)
James Smith Jr.	Eliminated	Eliminated (Semi Final)
Coby Grant	Eliminated	Eliminated (Semi Final)
Clifford Dwenger	Eliminated	Eliminated (Semi Final)
Rahel Maas	Eliminated	Eliminated (Semi Final)
Diana Babalola	Eliminated	Eliminated (Semi Final)

=== Team ===
Color key
Artist's info

- Artist from Team Michael Patrick
- Artist from Team Michi & Smudo
- Artist from Team Yvonne
- Artist from Team Mark

Result details

- Winner
- Runner-up
- Third place
- Fourth place
- Artist was eliminated

Artist	Week 1	Week 2 Finale
Samuel Rösch	Advanced	Winner
Bernarda Brunović	Eliminated	
Matthias Nebel	Eliminated	
Eros Atomus Isler	Advanced	Fourth place
Coby Grant	Eliminated	
Clifford Dwenger	Eliminated	
Benjamin Dolic	Advanced	Runner-up
Linda Alkhodor	Eliminated	
James Smith Jr.	Eliminated	
Jessica Schaffler	Advanced	Third place
Rahel Maas	Eliminated	
Diana Babalola	Eliminated	
