= Zenith (Alfie Arcuri album) =

Studio album by Alfie Arcuri
- Released: 29 July 2016
- Recorded: July 2016
- Genre: Pop
- Length: 35:35
- Label: Universal Music Australia
- Producer: Eric J. Dubowsky; Ryan Miller; Matthew Engst; Dave Hammer

Singles from Zenith
- 1. "Cruel" Released: 10 July 2016

Zenith is the debut studio album by Australian pop singer Alfie Arcuri. The album includes two original tracks as well as full length re-recorded studio version of songs he performed on the fifth season of The Voice Australia, where he won. The album was released through Universal Music Australia on 29 July 2016 and debuted and peaked at number 5 on the ARIA Albums Chart.

== Track listing ==
No.	Title	Writer(s)	Length
1.	"Cruel" (original song)	Alexander Izquierdo; James Abrahart; Serm Style; Jonathan "J.R." Rotem; Lindy Robbins	3:38
2.	"Careless Game" (original song)	Tonino Speciale; Troye Mellet	3:16
3.	"Pillowtalk" (Zayn Malik song)	Zayn Malik; Levi Lennox; Anthony Hannides; Michael Hannides; Joe Garrett	3:26
4.	"Scars" (James Bay song)	James Bay	4:04
5.	"Alive" (Sia song)	Adele Adkins; Sia Furler; Tobias Jesso Jr.	3:45
6.	"Red" (Daniel Merriweather song)	Amanda Ghost; Ian Dench; Scott McFarnon	3:32
7.	"Lay Me Down" (Sam Smith song)	Sam Smith; James Napier; Elvin Smith	3:56
8.	"All of Me" (John Legend song)	John Stephens; Toby Gad	4:42
9.	"Catapult" (Jack Savoretti song)	Jack Savoretti; Jon Green	3:11
10.	"I Can't Make You Love Me" (live; Bonnie Raitt song)	Allen Shamblin; Mike Reid	2:05
Total length:			35:35

== Charts ==
Chart (2016)	Peak position
Australian Albums (ARIA)	5

== Release history ==
Country	Date	Format	Label	Catalogue
Australia	29 July 2016	CD; digital download	Universal Music Australia	5701962
