= Männersachen =

Studio album by Roger Cicero
- Released: May 26, 2006
- Studio: Peer Studio · Studios des Berliner Rundfunks
- Genre: Jazz · pop jazz · vocal jazz
- Length: 45:53
- Label: Starwatch
- Producer: Frank Ramond · Matthias Hass

Roger Cicero chronology
There I Go (2005)	Männersachen (2006)	Beziehungsweise (2007)

Singles from Männersachen
- 1. "So geil Berlin (Digital single)" Released: May 26, 2006; 2. "Zieh die Schuh aus" Released: May 26, 2006; 3. "Ich atme ein" Released: May 26, 2006; 4. "Murphys Gesetz" Released: May 26, 2006; 5. "Frauen regier'n die Welt (Bonus)" Released: March 9, 2007

Männersachen (German for: "Guys' Stuff") is a studio album by German jazz musician Roger Cicero. The album was released on May 26, 2006 for the German record label Starwatch Music and is distributed through Warner Music Group throughout the world. The album marked Cicero's debut success as a solo artist reaching the charts top 40 in Switzerland, Austria and Germany. It received an Echo in 2007 and was certified with multiple gold awards in Germany and Austria.

It was re-released on March 9, 2007 and this time, included his Eurovision entry Frauen regier'n die Welt".

== Critical reception ==
AllMusic critic James Christopher Monger calls the release an "impressive debut," that "offers up 14 tracks that show off the son of renowned jazz pianist Eugen Cicero's gift for phrasing and clever arrangements". He recommends this album for people that like Michael Bublé's music or "contemporary swing in general". German music critic and journalist Frank Ehrlacher thinks that the album may not be "revolutionary", but notes the excellent musical work that can be heard on the release. In his review for CD Lexikon, Ehrlacher criticized the fact, that Cicero did not write many of the album's songs.

== Accolades ==
Year	Award	Category	Work	Result
2007	Echo	"Künstler des Jahres (national)" – National artist of the year	"Männersachen"	Won
2007	Echo	"Newcomer des Jahres (national)" – National newcomer of the year	"Männersachen"	Nominated

== Track listing ==
Männersachen – Standard edition
No.	Title	Writer(s)	Length
1.	"Zieh die Schuh aus"	Matthias Hass · Frank Ramond	3:18
2.	"Kein Mann für eine Frau"	Matthias Hass · Frank Ramond	2:44
3.	"Kompromisse"	Matthias Hass · Frank Ramond	3:14
4.	"Ich atme ein"	Matthias Hass · Frank Ramond	3:31
5.	"Schieß mich doch zum Mond (Fly Me To The Moon – In Other Words)"	Bart Howard · Frank Ramond	2:18
6.	"Wenn sie dich fragt"	Lutz Krajenski · Frank Ramond	4:44
7.	"Fachmann in Sachen Anna"	Matthias Hass · Frank Ramond	3:19
8.	"Ich Idiot ließ Dich gehen"	Matthias Hass · Frank Ramond	2:53
9.	"Mein guter Stern auf allen Wegen"	Roger Cicero · Frank Ramond	3:51
10.	"Murphys Gesetz"	Matthias Hass · Frank Ramond	4:05
11.	"Schön, dass du da bist"	Matthias Hass · Frank Ramond	2:38
12.	"Das ganze Leben ist ein Zoo"	Matthias Hass · Frank Ramond	3:05
13.	"Du willst es doch auch"	Matthias Hass · Frank Ramond	3:29
14.	"So geil Berlin"	Matthias Hass · Frank Ramond	2:43
15.	"Frauen regier'n die Welt (Bonus Track)"	Matthias Hass · Frank Ramond	2:59
Total length:			45:53

== Chart performance ==
=== Weekly charts ===
Chart (2006–2014)	Peak position
Austrian Albums (Ö3 Austria)	23
Dutch Albums (Album Top 100)	100
European Albums (IFPI)	13
German Albums (Offizielle Top 100)	3
Swiss Albums (Schweizer Hitparade)	40

=== Year-end charts ===
Chart (2006)	Position
German Albums (Offizielle Top 100)	16
Chart (2007)	Position
German Albums (Offizielle Top 100)	6

== Certifications ==
Region	Certification	Certified units/sales
Austria (IFPI Austria)	Gold	15,000^{*}
Germany (BVMI)	3× Platinum	600,000^{‡}
^{*} Sales figures based on certification alone.^{‡} Sales+streaming figures based on certification alone.
