= Germany in the Eurovision Song Contest 2020 =

- Eurovision Song Contest 2020
- Participating broadcaster: ARD (Note: Arbeitsgemeinschaft der öffentlich-rechtlichen Rundfunkanstalten der Bundesrepublik Deutschland) – Norddeutscher Rundfunk (NDR)
- Country: Germany
- Selection process: Internal selection
- Announcement date: 27 February 2020

Competing entry
- Song: "Violent Thing"
- Artist: Ben Dolic
- Songwriters: Borislav Milanov; Peter St. James; Dag Lundberg; Jimmy Thorén; Connor Martin

Placement
- Final result: Contest cancelled

Participation chronology

Germany was set to be represented at the Eurovision Song Contest 2020 with the song "Violent Thing", written by Borislav Milanov, Peter St. James, Dag Lundberg, Jimmy Thorén, and Connor Martin, and performed by Ben Dolic. The German participating broadcaster on behalf of ARD, Norddeutscher Rundfunk (NDR), internally selected its entry for the contest. The presentation of "Violent Thing" as the German entry occurred during the show Unser Lied für Rotterdam on 27 February 2020.

As a member of the "Big Five", Germany had automatically qualified to compete in the final of the Eurovision Song Contest; however, the contest was cancelled due to the COVID-19 pandemic. In its place, the entry was included in several Eurovision replacement events.

== Background ==
Prior to the 2020 contest, ARD has participated in the Eurovision Song Contest representing Germany 63 times since its debut at the inaugural contest in 1956. Germany has won the contest on two occasions: in 1982 with the song "Ein bißchen Frieden" performed by Nicole and in 2010 with the song "Satellite" performed by Lena. By 2020, Germany had been noted for competing in the contest more than any other country, with entries in every contest since the first edition with the exception of the 1996 contest when the nation was eliminated in a pre-contest elimination round.

As part of its duties as participating broadcaster, ARD organises the selection of its entry in the Eurovision Song Contest and broadcasts the event in the country. Since 1996, ARD has delegated the participation in the contest to its member Norddeutscher Rundfunk (NDR). The broadcaster confirmed that it would participate in the 2020 contest on 23 May 2019. Since 2013, NDR had set up national finals with several artists, to choose both the song and performer to compete for Germany. On 10 February 2020, the broadcaster announced that they would instead select the German entry internally this year. In regards to the internal selection, ARD's entertainment coordinator and head of the fiction and entertainment department for NDR, Thomas Schreiber, stated: "The German final and the Eurovision Song Contest reach completely different people. However, to find a successful Eurovision act it is important that the same people who do vote in the big contest also decide which singer should represent a country. That's the reason, why we then only let the Eurovision Panel together with the international jury decide on the German act."

== Before Eurovision ==
=== Internal selection process ===
The German entry for the Eurovision Song Contest 2020 was selected internally by NDR. Interested performers and songwriters were able to submit their entries to NDR, and additional proposals were received from artists, songwriters, and producers who were invited by NDR. Several songwriting camps with German and international composers and lyricists were also held between June and October 2019, during which 84 songs were created and submitted for selection. 607 artist applications and 568 songs were received by NDR at the close of the submission deadline. 100 performers and 74 songs were longlisted by a Eurovision panel consisting of 30 members selected in cooperation with Simon-Kucher and Digame from 2.26 million applications received from German residents through surveys on social media in order to reflect the taste of the wider European audience, while 50 performers and 34 songs were shortlisted by an alternate Eurovision panel consisting of 100 members selected through a similar process. The 34 songs were then tested with the 50 artists, and the top 20 combinations of artist and song were determined by the 100-member Eurovision panel and an international jury. The international jury panel consisted of 20 members who had been national juries for their respective countries at the Eurovision Song Contest. Videos of the 20 combinations were recorded and presented to both groups that ultimately selected the German entry in December 2019.

=== Entry reveal ===
Single cover of "Violent Thing" performed by Ben Dolic, which was internally selected to represent Germany in the Eurovision Song Contest 2020.

On 27 February 2020, "Violent Thing" performed by Slovenian singer Ben Dolic, was announced by NDR as the German entry for the 2020 Eurovision Song Contest during the show Unser Lied für Rotterdam (English: Our Song for Rotterdam), which was held at the HafenCity in Hamburg, hosted by Barbara Schöneberger and broadcast on One as well as online via the broadcaster's official website ardmediathek.de and Eurovision Song Contest website eurovision.de. In addition to the reveal of Germany's entry, the 45-minute show included guest appearances by the nation's 2018 representative Michael Schulte and Eurovision commentator Peter Urban. The song also became available for digital download and streaming on the same day, through record label Universal Music.

Ben Dolic previously attempted to represent Slovenia at the Eurovision Song Contest in 2016 by competing in the national final EMA 2016 as a member of the group D Base with the song "Spet živ". "Violent Thing" was written by members of the songwriting team Symphonix International: Bulgaria-born Borislav Milanov, joined by Peter St. James, Dag Lundberg, Jimmy Thorén and Connor Martin. In regards to his selection as the German entrant, Dolic stated: "When I got the news that I had been accepted by the juries, I was totally overwhelmed. Taking part in the Eurovision Song Contest for Germany was a dream come true for me. This is where I made my breakthrough as a professional singer. I think we have the perfect song for the Eurovision Song Contest, and I will give everything I have for Germany." Upon its reveal, the length of "Violent Thing" was longer than the three-minute maximum for a Eurovision entry, so it was subsequently shortened as the singer prepared for presenting the final version of the song.

== At Eurovision ==
The Eurovision Song Contest 2020 was originally scheduled to take place at Rotterdam Ahoy in Rotterdam, Netherlands and consist of two semi-finals on 12 and 14 May, and a final on 16 May 2020. However, due to COVID-19 pandemic, the contest was cancelled. The EBU announced soon after that entries intended for 2020 would not be eligible for the following year, though each broadcaster would be able to send either their 2020 representative or a new one. In October 2020, Dolic stated that he was not interested in returning to Eurovision for the time being, tweeting "I don't feel that the direction I am moving in is a suitable fit for Eurovision. I want to prioritize myself and my career and I am working on releasing more music as an independent artist".

Prior to the contest's cancelation, many aspects of Germany's participation had already been determined. According to Eurovision rules, all nations with the exceptions of the host country and the "Big Five" (France, Germany, Italy, Spain and the United Kingdom) are required to qualify from one of two semi-finals in order to compete for the final; the top ten countries from each semi-final progress to the final. As a member of the "Big 5", Germany had automatically qualified to compete in the final on 16 May 2020. In addition to their participation in the final, Germany would have also been required to broadcast and vote in one of the two semi-finals. The semi-final allocation draw had taken place on 28 January 2020, and Germany was assigned to broadcast and vote in the first semi-final on 12 May 2020. Dolic's stage presence was announced to be directed by Marty Kudelka, who in the past had worked with American performer Justin Timberlake and on projects including the Super Bowl.

=== Alternative song contests ===
Some of the broadcasters scheduled to take part in the Eurovision Song Contest 2020 organised alternative competitions and showcase events. Germany's NDR and ARD aired a programme titled World Wide Wohnzimmer on 9 May which featured the music videos of all of the 2020 entries (with the exception of Germany's). The top 10 entries as voted upon by the German public then moved on to a final titled Eurovision 2020 – das deutsche Finale, which aired on 16 May.

Germany's entry was able to take part in Austria's ORF broadcast Der kleine Song Contest in April 2020, which saw every entry being assigned to one of three semi-finals. A jury consisting of ten singers that had represented Austria at Eurovision before was hired to rank each song; the best-placed entry in each semi-final advanced to the final round. In the third semi-final on 18 April, Germany placed third in a field of 13 participants, achieving 66 points. Germany's song also took part in Sveriges Television's Sveriges 12:a in May, and was qualified for the final round, where it finished in 11th place out of the 25 finalists.
