= Samuel Rösch =

German singer (born 1994)

- Born: 24 August 1994 (age 32); Großrückerswalde, Saxony, Germany
- Genres: Pop; soul
- Occupation: Singer
- Instrument: Vocals
- Years active: 2018–present
- Label: UMG

Samuel Rösch (born 24 August 1994) is a German singer. He appeared on and won the eighth season of The Voice of Germany.

Awards and achievements
Preceded by Natia Todua	The Voice of Germany; Winner; 2018	Succeeded by Claudia Emmanuela Santoso
