= The Voice (Australian TV series) season 5 =

The Voice
- Season 5
- Promotional poster featuring coaches Keating, Goodrem, Madden Brothers, and Jessie J
- Hosted by: Sonia Kruger
- Judges: Ronan Keating; Jessie J Delta Goodrem; The Madden Brothers
- Winner: Alfie Arcuri
- Winning coach: Delta Goodrem
- Runner-up: Adam Ladell

Release
- Original network: Nine Network
- Original release: 1 May – 10 July 2016

Season chronology
- ← Previous; Season 4 Next → Season 6

The fifth season of The Voice began on 1 May 2016. Jessie J, Delta Goodrem and The Madden Brothers returned as coaches with Ronan Keating replacing Ricky Martin. Sonia Kruger became solo host of the season after Darren McMullen left the series.

Alfie Arcuri from Team Delta won the competition, marking Goodrem's first victory as a coach and the second female coach after Jessie J to win a season. Adam Ladell, also from Team Delta, finished as runner-up, while Tash Lockhart and Ellen Reed finished in third and fourth place, respectively. This season was the last to feature The Madden Brothers and Jessie J as coaches. This is also the first series where the first artist to auditon, in this case Arcuri, ended up winning the series.

== Coaches and host ==
Of the coaches from the previous season, Jessie J, Delta Goodrem, and The Madden Brothers returned. Ricky Martin departed the series and was replaced by Boyzone member Ronan Keating. During the third live show, The Madden Brothers were absent due to touring commitments & were replaced by sister duo The Veronicas.

Coaches and Host of The Voice Season 5

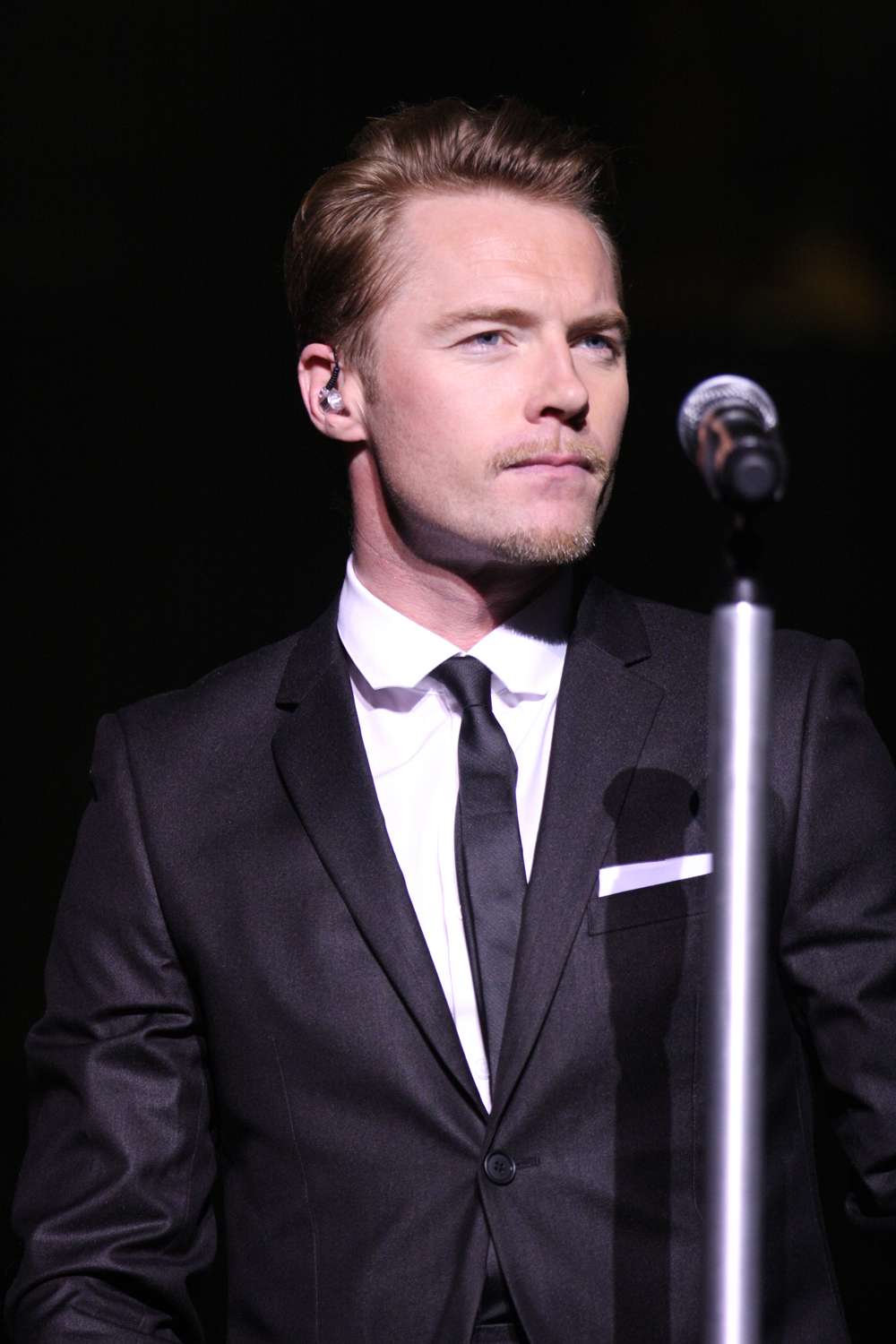
Ronan Keating

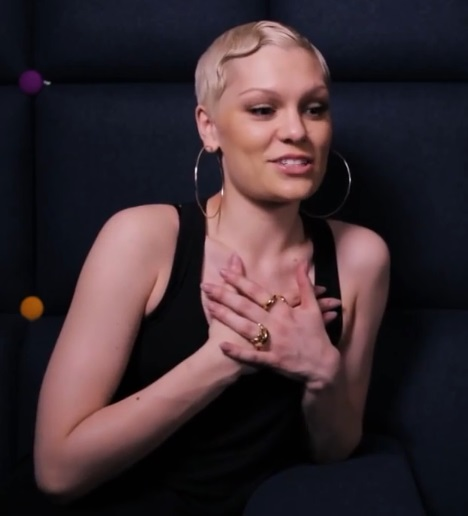
Jessie J

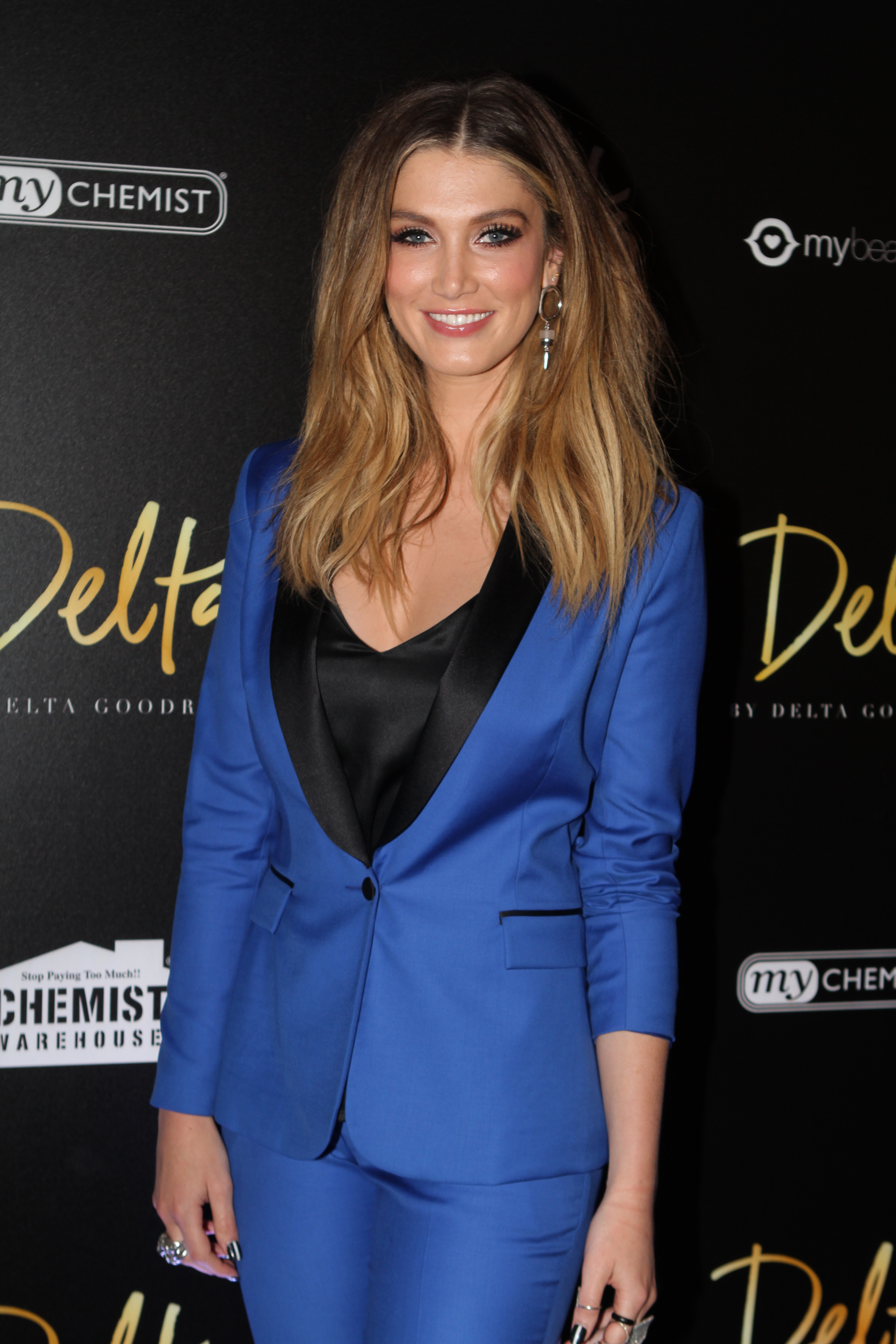
Delta Goodrem

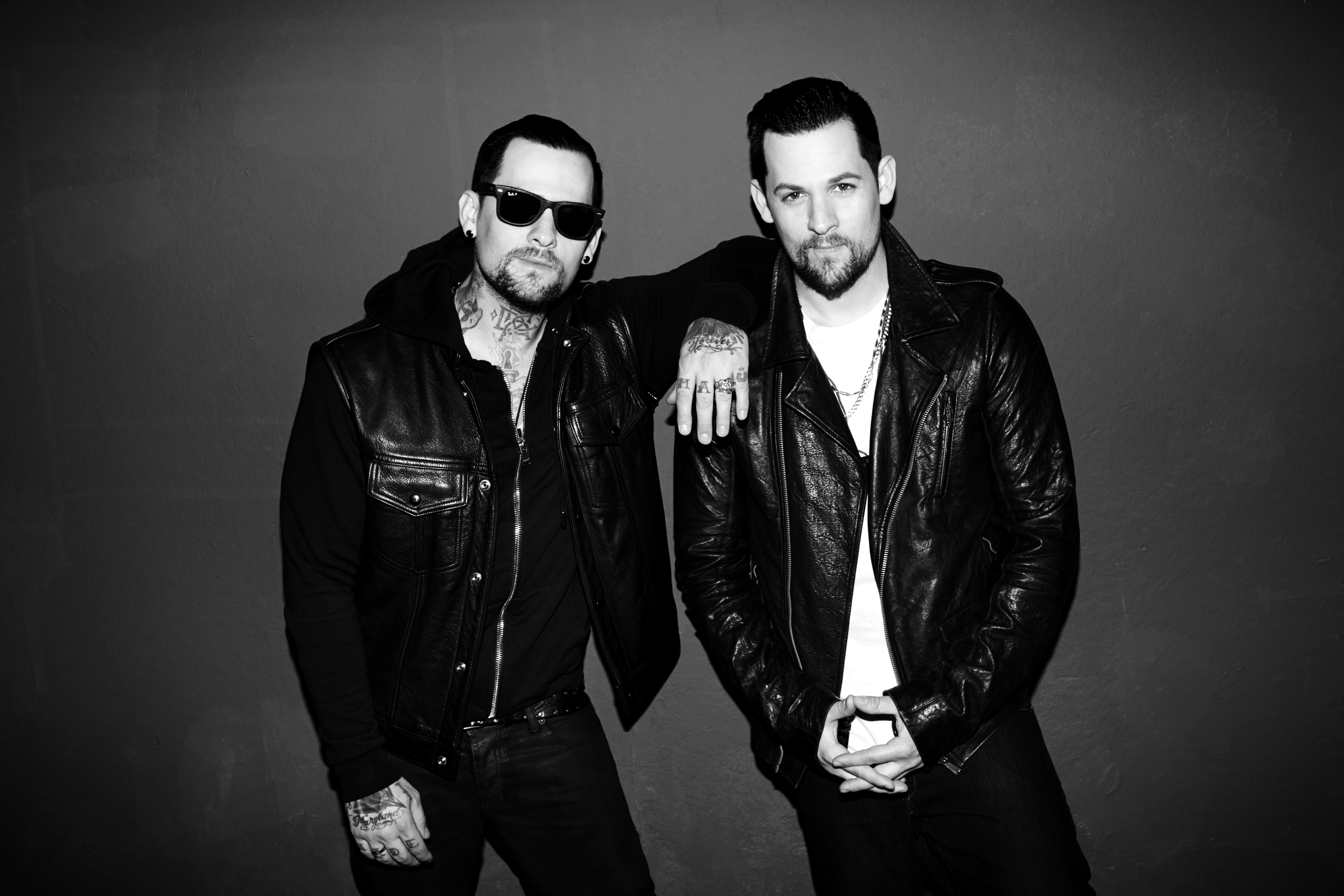
The Madden Brothers

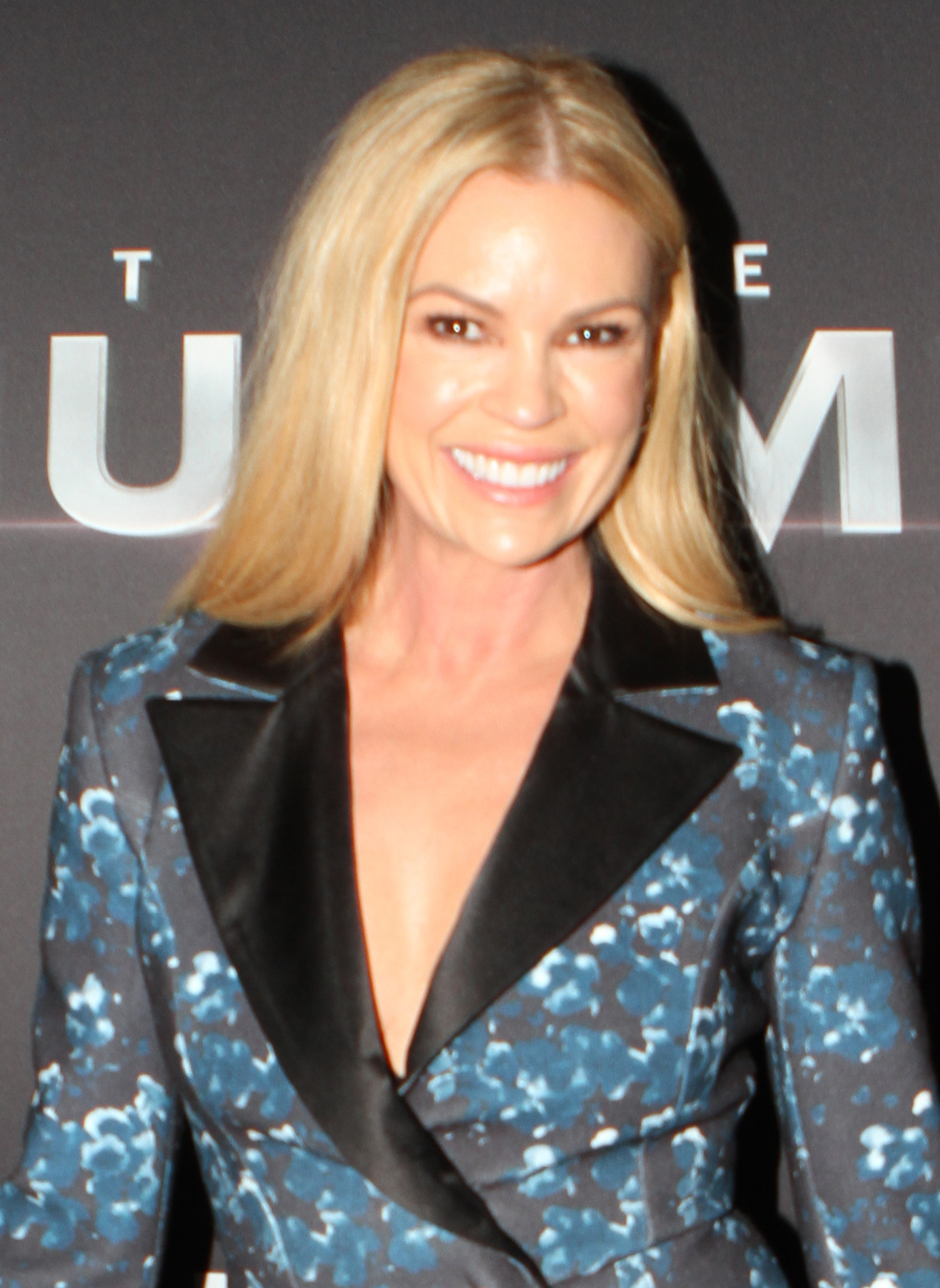
Sonia Kruger (host)

== Teams ==
Color key

- Winner
- Runner-up
- Third place
- Fourth place
- Eliminated in the Live shows
- Eliminated in the Super Battle round
- Artist was saved at the Battle rounds
- Eliminated in the Battle rounds

| Coach | Top 48 | | | | |
|---|---|---|---|---|---|
| Ronan Keating | | | | | |
| Ronan Keating | Tash Lockhart | Mitch Gardner | Georgia Wiggins | Emad Younan | Georgia Carey |
| Ronan Keating | Kayleigh Killick | Nina Ferro | Sam Trenwith | ~~Adam Ladell~~ | ~~Mikaela Dean~~ |
| Ronan Keating | Astrid Ripepi | Kate Van Elswijk | Nic Jeffries | Sarah Browne | |
| Jessie J | | | | | |
| Jessie J | Ellen Reed | Jack Pellow | Mikaela Dean | Brianna Holm | Ashleigh Marshall |
| Jessie J | The Koi Boys | Maddison McNamara | Nada-Leigh & Jasmin | ~~Aaliyah Warren~~ | ~~Calvin Swart~~ |
| Jessie J | ~~Carmel Rodrigues~~ | Claire Howell | Ilisavani Cava | | |
| Delta Goodrem | | | | | |
| Delta Goodrem | Alfie Arcuri | Adam Ladell | Kim Sheehy | Elle Murphy | Marcia Howard |
| Delta Goodrem | Calvin Swart | Maryann Wright | Shirin Majd | ~~Tash Lockhart~~ | Andrew McKinnon |
| Delta Goodrem | Ben Logan | Crissy Ashcroft | Maxon | Natasha Hoeberigs | |
| The Madden Brothers | | | | | |
| The Madden Brothers | Andrew Loadsman | Aaliyah Warren | Lane Sinclair | Lexi Clark | Blake Morgan |
| The Madden Brothers | Carmel Rodrigues | Nazzereene Taleb | Talia Giancaspro | ~~Georgia Wiggins~~ | ~~Maddison McNamara~~ |
| The Madden Brothers | Casey Rose | Don Leaton | Kylie Jane | Nathan Lamont | |
Note: Italicized names are stolen artists (names struck through within former teams).

== Blind auditions ==
Color key

| ✔ | Coach hit the "I/WE WANT YOU" button |
| | Artist defaulted to this team |
| | Artist elected to join this team |
| | Artist eliminated with no coach pressing "I/WE WANT YOU" button |
| | Artist received an 'All Turn'. |

=== Episode 1 (1 May) ===
The coaches performed a cover of "Hello" together at the start of the show.

| Order | Artist | Age | Song | Coaches and artists choices | | | |
| Order | Artist | Age | Song | Ronan | Jessie | Delta | Joel & Benji |
|---|---|---|---|---|---|---|---|
| 1 | Alfie Arcuri | 27 | "Scars" | ✔ | ✔ | ✔ | ✔ |
| 2 | Blake Morgan | 21 | "Talk Is Cheap" | — | — | — | ✔ |
| 3 | Claire Fabri | 20 | "I Kissed a Girl" | — | — | — | — |
| 4 | Jack Pellow | 22 | "From Eden" | ✔ | ✔ | ✔ | — |
| 5 | Maddison McNamara | 21 | "Gone" | ✔ | ✔ | ✔ | ✔ |
| 6 | Ace Avenue | 26 | "When You Say Nothing at All" | — | — | — | — |
| 7 | Lexi Clark | 19 | "Nothing's Real but Love" | ✔ | — | ✔ | ✔ |

=== Episode 2 (2 May) ===
| Order | Artist | Age | Song | Coaches and artists choices | | | |
| Order | Artist | Age | Song | Ronan | Jessie | Delta | Joel & Benji |
|---|---|---|---|---|---|---|---|
| 1 | Elle Murphy | 19 | "Devil Inside" | ✔ | — | ✔ | ✔ |
| 2 | Jay Parrino | 30 | "Whole Lotta Love" | — | — | — | — |
| 3 | Tash Lockhart | 22 | "Turning Tables" | ✔ | — | ✔ | — |
| 4 | Claire Howell | 18 | "Who You Are" | ✔ | ✔ | ✔ | ✔ |
| 5 | Truman Mullins | 24 | "Latch" | — | — | — | — |
| 6 | Maryann Wright | 25 | "Maybe This Time" | ✔ | — | ✔ | — |
| 7 | Lane Sinclair | 21 | "When You Were Young" | ✔ | — | ✔ | ✔ |
| 8 | Georgia Carey | 21 | "Let It Go" | ✔ | ✔ | ✔ | ✔ |

=== Episode 3 (3 May) ===
| Order | Artist | Age | Song | Coaches and artists choices | | | |
| Order | Artist | Age | Song | Ronan | Jessie | Delta | Joel & Benji |
|---|---|---|---|---|---|---|---|
| 1 | Sam Trenwith | 21 | "I Don't Wanna Be" | ✔ | — | ✔ | — |
| 2 | Nina Ferro | 42 | "Why" | ✔ | — | ✔ | ✔ |
| 3 | Mitchell Cox | 26 | "This Is The Moment" | — | — | — | — |
| 4 | Sarah Jane | 28 | "How Deep Is Your Love" | — | — | — | — |
| 5 | Mitch Gardner | 19 | "Only Love" | ✔ | — | ✔ | — |
| 6 | Ben Logan | 44 | "Caruzo" | — | — | ✔ | — |
| 7 | Jordan Welshman | 20 | "Amnesia" | — | — | — | — |
| 8 | Brianna Holm | 20 | "Creep" | ✔ | ✔ | ✔ | ✔ |

=== Episode 4 (9 May) ===
| Order | Artist | Age | Song | Coaches and artists choices | | | |
| Order | Artist | Age | Song | Ronan | Jessie | Delta | Joel & Benji |
|---|---|---|---|---|---|---|---|
| 1 | Andrew Loadsman | 30 | "Demons" | ✔ | ✔ | ✔ | ✔ |
| 2 | Alexandra Younes | 20 | "Hate on Me" | — | — | — | — |
| 3 | Calvin Swart | 20 | "Style" | — | ✔ | — | ✔ |
| 4 | Casey Rose* | 22 | "Poker Face" | ✔ | — | — | ✔ |
| 5 | Marcia Howard | 55 | "Fields of Gold" | — | — | ✔ | — |
| 6 | Col Usher | 39 | "When Love Comes to Town" | — | — | — | — |
| 7 | Aaliyah Warren | 17 | "Runnin' (Lose It All)" | — | ✔ | — | ✔ |
| 8 | Adam Ladell | 16 | "Trouble" | ✔ | ✔ | ✔ | ✔ |

- Casey Rose originally was a duo with Barnaby, however, the coaches told her that she is better off alone. They gave her the decision to split and become a solo or continue as a duet with Barnaby and be eliminated in the battles. She, with Barnaby’s approval, chose to split, however, Casey was still eliminated in the battles after choosing to go with team Madden Brothers.

=== Episode 5 (10 May) ===
| Order | Artist | Age | Song | Coaches and artists choices | | | |
| Order | Artist | Age | Song | Ronan | Jessie | Delta | Joel & Benji |
|---|---|---|---|---|---|---|---|
| 1 | Don Leaton | 18 | "High Hopes" | ✔ | ✔ | — | ✔ |
| 2 | Susan Songsuk | 23 | "One Night Only" | — | — | — | — |
| 3 | Ashleigh Marshall | 16 | "Reflection" | ✔ | ✔ | — | ✔ |
| 4 | Bella Maree | 18 | "I'd Rather Go Blind" | — | — | — | — |
| 5 | Emad Younan | 39 | "Only You" | ✔ | — | — | — |
| 6 | Emily Markham | 21 | "9 to 5" | — | — | — | — |
| 7 | Maxon | 27 | "Wings" | — | — | ✔ | — |
| 8 | Ilisavani Cava | 22 | "I'm Not the Only One" | ✔ | ✔ | — | — |

=== Episode 6 (15 May) ===
| Order | Artist | Age | Song | Coaches and artists choices | | | |
| Order | Artist | Age | Song | Ronan | Jessie | Delta | Joel & Benji |
|---|---|---|---|---|---|---|---|
| 1 | Carmel Rodrigues | 16 | "Part of Your World" | — | ✔ | — | ✔ |
| 2 | Mikaela Dean | 21 | "Changing" | ✔ | — | — | — |
| 3 | Nathan Lamont | 22 | "Like I'm Gonna Lose You" | ✔ | — | — | ✔ |
| 4 | Clancy Dunn | 76 | "Can't Help Falling in Love" | — | — | — | — |
| 5 | Micah Rothwell | 21 | "The House of the Rising Sun" | — | — | — | — |
| 6 | Crissy Ashcroft | 49 | "When the War Is Over" | — | — | ✔ | — |
| 7 | Kate Van Elswijk | 19 | "People Help the People" | ✔ | — | — | — |
| 8 | Kayleigh Killick | 27 | "We Found Love" | ✔ | ✔ | — | — |

=== Episode 7 (16 May) ===
| Order | Artist | Age | Song | Coaches and artists choices | | | |
| Order | Artist | Age | Song | Ronan | Jessie | Delta | Joel & Benji |
|---|---|---|---|---|---|---|---|
| 1 | Kayla Piscopo | 16 | "Titanium" | — | — | — | — |
| 2 | Kim Sheehy | 28 | "She Used To Be Mine" | ✔ | — | ✔ | — |
| 3 | Dem & Amy Kwong | 21/23 | "If I Were a Boy" | — | — | — | — |
| 4 | Stephen Ward | 21 | "With a Little Help from My Friends" | — | — | — | — |
| 5 | Kylie Jane Howard | 24 | "What I Did for Love" | ✔ | — | — | ✔ |
| 6 | Codi Kaye | N/A | "When We Were Young" | — | — | — | — |
| 7 | Cody Bell | N/A | "How Will I Know" | — | — | — | — |
| 8 | David O'Brien | N/A | "Babylon" | — | — | — | — |
| 9 | Shirin Majd | 34 | "Ave Maria" | — | — | ✔ | — |
| 10 | Talia Giancaspro | 30 | "Angel" | — | — | — | ✔ |
| 11 | The Koi Boys | N/A | "Sh-Boom (Life Could Be a Dream)" | ✔ | ✔ | ✔ | ✔ |

=== Episode 8 (22 May) ===
| Order | Artist | Age | Song | Coaches and artists choices | | | |
| Order | Artist | Age | Song | Ronan | Jessie | Delta | Joel & Benji |
|---|---|---|---|---|---|---|---|
| 1 | Jasmin Jade Nasser | 21 | "Almost Is Never Enough" | ✔ | ✔ | — | — |
| 2 | Nada-Leigh Nasser | 23 | "And I Am Telling You I'm Not Going" | — | ✔ | — | — |
| 3 | Blake Tailor | 20 | "Lonely Boy" | — | — | — | — |
| 4 | Astrid Ripepi | 24 | "Fallin'" | ✔ | — | — | — |
| 5 | Nic Jeffries | 32 | "Bridge Over Troubled Water" | ✔ | ✔ | ✔ | ✔ |
| 6 | Nazzereene Taleb | 19 | "Gravity" | — | — | — | ✔ |
| 7 | Pascoe Braun | 52 | "When the Saints Go Marching In" | — | — | — | — |
| 8 | Georgia Wiggins | 16 | "All I Want" | ✔ | — | — | ✔ |

=== Episode 9 (23 May) ===
| Order | Artist | Age | Song | Coaches and artists choices | | | |
| Order | Artist | Age | Song | Ronan | Jessie | Delta | Joel & Benji |
|---|---|---|---|---|---|---|---|
| 1 | Natasha Hoeberigs | 23 | "Cry Me a River" | ✔ | — | ✔ | Team full |
| 2 | Beau Lamshed | 25 | "Dangerous" | — | — | — | Team full |
| 3 | Sarah Browne | 32 | "Make You Feel My Love" | ✔ | — | — | Team full |
| 4 | Billie Court | 41 | "Proud Mary" | Team full | — | — | Team full |
| 5 | Nick Tabone | 24 | "Bloodstream" | Team full | — | — | Team full |
| 6 | Andrew McKinnon | 19 | "Resolution" | Team full | — | ✔ | Team full |
| 7 | Katrina Noela | N/A | "Habanera" | Team full | — | Team full | Team full |
| 8 | Jaycee | N/A | "Higher Ground" | Team full | — | Team full | Team full |
| 9 | Victor Johl | 25 | "When I Get You Alone" | Team full | — | Team full | Team full |
| 10 | Ellen Reed | 27 | "Chandelier" | Team full | ✔ | Team full | Team full |

== Battle rounds ==
Color key

– Contestant wins battle round/advances to the Super Battles
– Contestant loses battle round but gets saved/advances
– Contestant loses battle round and is eliminated

=== Episode 10 (29 May) ===
The first episode of the Battle Rounds was first broadcast on 29 May 2016. The coaches opened the show performing a cover of "One Way or Another (Teenage Kicks)" together.

| Order | Coach | Winner | Battle Song | Loser | 'Steal' result | | | |
| Order | Coach | Winner | Battle Song | Loser | Ronan | Jessie | Delta | Joel & Benji |
|---|---|---|---|---|---|---|---|---|
| 1 | Ronan Keating | Sam Trenwith | "Harder to Breathe" | Mikaela Dean | N/A | ✔ | ✔ | ✔ |
| 2 | Jessie J | Ashleigh Marshall | "Colours of the Wind" | Carmel Rodriguez | — | N/A | — | ✔ |
| 3 | Delta Goodrem | Elle Murphy | "What Kind of Man" | Tash Lockhart | ✔ | — | N/A | ✔ |
| 4 | The Maddens | Blake Morgan | "Stitches" | Don Leaton | — | — | — | N/A |
| 5 | Ronan Keating | Nina Ferro | "All I Ask" | Nic Jeffries | N/A | — | — | — |
| 6 | Jessie J | Jack Pellow | "Sweet Dreams (Are Made of This)" | Calvin Swart | — | N/A | ✔ | — |
| 7 | Delta Goodrem | Maryann Wright | "Memory" | Natasha Hoeberigs | — | — | N/A | — |
| 8 | The Maddens | Lane Sinclair | "Everybody Wants to Rule the World" | Georgia Wiggins | ✔ | — | — | N/A |

=== Episode 11 (30 May) ===
The second episode of the Battle Rounds was first broadcast on 30 May 2016.

| Order | Coach | Winner | Battle Song | Loser | 'Steal' result | | | |
| Order | Coach | Winner | Battle Song | Loser | Ronan | Jessie | Delta | Joel & Benji |
|---|---|---|---|---|---|---|---|---|
| 1 | Jessie J | The Koi Boys | "Uptown Funk" | Ilisavani Cava | Team full | N/A | — | — |
| 2 | Ronan Keating | Kayleigh Killick | "Never Forget You" | Astrid Ripepi | Team full | — | — | — |
| 3 | Delta Goodrem | Kim Sheehy | "Goodbye Yellow Brick Road" | Maxon | Team full | — | N/A | — |
| 4 | The Maddens | Andrew Loadsman | "I Will Wait" | Nathan Lamont | Team full | — | — | N/A |
| 5 | Ronan Keating | Emad Younan | "Dancing in the Dark" | Sarah Browne | Team full | — | — | — |
| 6 | The Maddens | Nazzereene Taleb | "Stole the Show" | Maddison McNamara | Team full | ✔ | — | N/A |
| 7 | Delta Goodrem | Marcia Howard | "Wicked Game" | Crissy Ashcroft | Team full | Team full | N/A | — |
| 8 | Jessie J | Nada-Leigh Nasser* | "How Come U Don't Call Me Anymore?" | Jasmin Jade Nasser* | Team full | Team full | — | — |

- Finding it difficult to choose a battle winner between Nada-Leigh and Jasmin Jade, Jessie J chose both of them to advance as a duo with approval from the producers.

=== Episode 12 (5 June) ===
The third episode of the Battle Rounds will be broadcast on 5 June 2016.

| Order | Coach | Winner | Battle Song | Loser | 'Steal' result | | | |
| Order | Coach | Winner | Battle Song | Loser | Ronan | Jessie | Delta | Joel & Benji |
|---|---|---|---|---|---|---|---|---|
| 1 | The Maddens | Lexi Clark | "Ex's & Oh's" | Casey Rose | Team full | Team full | — | N/A |
| 2 | Delta Goodrem | Alfie Arcuri | "Drag Me Down" | Andrew McKinnon | Team full | Team full | N/A | — |
| 3 | Jessie J | Brianna Holm | "Smells Like Teen Spirit" | Aaliyah Warren | Team full | Team full | — | ✔ |
| 4 | Ronan Keating | Georgia Carey | "Believe" | Kate Van Elswijk | Team full | Team full | — | Team full |
| 5 | Delta Goodrem | Shirin Majd | "The Prayer" | Ben Logan | Team full | Team full | N/A | Team full |
| 6 | The Maddens | Talia Giancaspro | "Not Ready to Make Nice" | Kylie Jane | Team full | Team full | — | Team full |
| 7 | Ronan Keating | Mitch Gardner | "Firestone" | Adam Ladell | Team full | Team full | ✔ | Team full |
| 8 | Jessie J | Ellen Reed | "Unconditionally" | Claire Howell | Team full | Team full | Team full | Team full |

== Super Battle round ==
Each coach splits their team into two groups of four. Those four artists then take to the stage together and each perform a different song in a head-to-head duel. Two go through to the Live Shows, while two are eliminated, with no saves available. Plus, the songs in each Super Battle have a theme picked by the coaches.

Color key

– Contestant wins battle round/advances to the lives
– Contestant loses battle round and is eliminated

=== Episode 13 (6 June) ===
The Super Battle round was first broadcast on 6 June 2016.

The Super Battles

| Order | Coach | Theme | Winners | | Losers | |
| Order | Coach | Theme | Contestant | Song | Contestant | Song |
|---|---|---|---|---|---|---|
| 1 | Jessie J | The King of Pop (Michael Jackson) | Mikaela Dean | "They Don't Care About Us" | The Koi Boys | "P.Y.T. (Pretty Young Thing)" |
| 1 | Jessie J | The King of Pop (Michael Jackson) | Jack Pellow | "Billie Jean" | Ashleigh Marshall | "Ben" |
| 2 | The Maddens | Girls & Boys | Andrew Loadsman | "Lean On" | Blake Morgan | "Dark Horse" |
| 2 | The Maddens | Girls & Boys | Aaliyah Warren | "7 Years" | Nazzereene Taleb | "Earned It" |
| 3 | Delta Goodrem | Stage and Screen | Elle Murphy | "Skyfall" | Maryann Wright | "I Don't Know How to Love Him" |
| 3 | Delta Goodrem | Stage and Screen | Adam Ladell | "Safe & Sound" | Shirin Majd | "Habanera" |
| 4 | Ronan Keating | Songs of Ireland | Emad Younan | "Danny Boy" | Georgia Carey | "Someone New" |
| 4 | Ronan Keating | Songs of Ireland | Georgia Wiggins | "Zombie" | Nina Ferro | "With or Without You" |
| 5 | The Maddens | American Anthems | Lane Sinclair | "I'm On Fire" | Carmel Rodrigues | "I'd Do Anything for Love" |
| 5 | The Maddens | American Anthems | Lexi Clark | "Seven Nation Army" | Talia Giancaspro | "Jolene" |
| 6 | Delta Goodrem | Homegrown Hits | Alfie Arcuri | "Red" | Calvin Swart | "Remind Me" |
| 6 | Delta Goodrem | Homegrown Hits | Kim Sheehy | "Everyone's Waiting" | Marcia Howard | "Throw Your Arms Around Me" |
| 7 | Ronan Keating | Legends and Legacies | Tash Lockhart | "Heroes" | Kayleigh Killick | "Tears Dry on Their Own" |
| 7 | Ronan Keating | Legends and Legacies | Mitch Gardner | "Blackbird" | Sam Trenwith | "It's a Man's World" |
| 8 | Jessie J | Battle of the Brits | Brianna Holm | "The Scientist" | Maddison McNamara | "Jealous" |
| 8 | Jessie J | Battle of the Brits | Ellen Reed | "Hold My Hand" | Nada-Leigh & Jasmin | "Wings" |

== The Live Shows ==
=== Episode 14 (13 June) ===
The first episode of the Live shows was first broadcast on 13 June 2016. Each of the coach's four artists performed a song. Each coach then saved one of their artists, guaranteeing them a performance in the second live show. The remaining artists faced the public vote all week. Then, the artist with the fewest votes from each team was eliminated during Live Show two before they got a chance to perform.

| Order | Coach | Contestant | Song | Result |
|---|---|---|---|---|
| 1 | Jessie J | Ellen Reed | "Ghost" | Saved by public |
| 2 | Jessie J | Brianna Holm | "Samson" | Eliminated |
| 3 | Jessie J | Jack Pellow | "Blame It on Me" | Saved by public |
| 4 | Jessie J | Mikaela Dean | "Take Me Home" | Saved by coach |
| 5 | The Maddens | Lexi Clark | "Rumour Has It" | Eliminated |
| 6 | The Maddens | Aaliyah Warren | "Welcome to the Black Parade" | Saved by coach |
| 7 | The Maddens | Andrew Loadsman | "Say Something" | Saved by public |
| 8 | The Maddens | Lane Sinclair | "Video Games" | Saved by public |
| 9 | Ronan Keating | Tash Lockhart | "Be the One" | Saved by public |
| 10 | Ronan Keating | Mitch Gardner | "Down Under" | Saved by coach |
| 11 | Ronan Keating | Georgia Wiggins | "Hide Away" | Saved by public |
| 12 | Ronan Keating | Emad Younan | "Vincent" | Eliminated |
| 13 | Delta Goodrem | Elle Murphy | "Somebody to Love" | Eliminated |
| 14 | Delta Goodrem | Kim Sheehy | "Hearts a Mess" | Saved by public |
| 15 | Delta Goodrem | Alfie Arcuri | "Pillowtalk" | Saved by coach |
| 16 | Delta Goodrem | Adam Ladell | "Imagine" | Saved by public |

=== Episode 15 (19 June) ===
The second episode of the Live shows was first broadcast on 19 June 2016.

| Order | Coach | Contestant | Song | Result |
|---|---|---|---|---|
| 1 | The Maddens | Andrew Loadsman | "Hold Back the River" | Saved by public |
| 2 | The Maddens | Aaliyah Warren | "Killing Me Softly" | Saved by public |
| 3 | The Maddens | Lane Sinclair | "Life on Mars" | Eliminated |
| 4 | Jessie J | Jack Pellow | "Stressed Out" | Saved by public |
| 5 | Jessie J | Ellen Reed | "Stone Cold" | Saved by public |
| 6 | Jessie J | Mikaela Dean | "Finally" | Eliminated |
| 7 | Delta Goodrem | Adam Ladell | "Chasing Cars" | Saved by public |
| 8 | Delta Goodrem | Kim Sheehy | "Wild Things" | Eliminated |
| 9 | Delta Goodrem | Alfie Arcuri | "Lay Me Down" | Saved by public |
| 10 | Ronan Keating | Tash Lockhart | "Riptide" | Saved by public |
| 11 | Ronan Keating | Georgia Wiggins | "Fast Car" | Eliminated |
| 12 | Ronan Keating | Mitch Gardner | "Wasn't Expecting That" | Saved by public |

=== Episode 16 (26 June) ===
The third episode of the Live shows was first broadcast on 26 June 2016. Due to a pre-commitment The Madden Brothers had with their band Good Charlotte, Australian sister band The Veronicas filled in as judges in their place for this episode and also performed their new single "In My Blood".

| Order | Coach | Contestant | Song | Result |
|---|---|---|---|---|
| 1 | Jessie J | Ellen Reed | "Since U Been Gone" | Bottom four |
| 2 | Jessie J | Jack Pellow | "Hotline Bling" | Saved by public |
| 3 | The Maddens | Aaliyah Warren | "Don't Let Me Down" | Bottom four |
| 4 | The Maddens | Andrew Loadsman | "Gold on the Ceiling" | Saved by public |
| 5 | Delta Goodrem | Alfie Arcuri | "I Can't Make You Love Me" | Bottom four |
| 6 | Delta Goodrem | Adam Ladell | "Faded" | Saved by public |
| 7 | Ronan Keating | Mitch Gardner | "Love Yourself" | Bottom four |
| 8 | Ronan Keating | Tash Lockhart | "Run" | Saved by public |

== The Semi-Finals ==
The Semi-Finals was broadcast on 3 July 2016. At the beginning of the show, the four artists with the most votes (one per team) were fast tracked to the second half of the show, the four artists with the fewest votes (one per team) performed to stay in the competition. Only two made it through on an instant app vote mid-show to join the top four artists, giving us the top six. The top six performed their Semi-Final song, followed by another instant app vote, and from there the top four were announced and advanced to The Grand Finale. Coach Delta Goodrem performed her new single "Enough" featuring Gizzle.

- With the elimination of Andrew Loadsman, The Maddens had no more contestants left on their team, making this the second season in the Australian version of the franchise where a coach did not have a contestant in the grand finale.

| Order | Coach | Contestant | Song | Result |
Sing-off performances
| 1.1 | Jessie J | Ellen Reed | "Good Luck" | Instant Save |
| 1.2 | The Maddens | Aaliyah Warren | "Stay" | Eliminated |
| 1.3 | Delta Goodrem | Alfie Arcuri | "Alive" | Instant Save |
| 1.4 | Ronan Keating | Mitch Gardner | "Talk Me Down" | Eliminated |
Top 6 performances
| 2.1 | Jessie J | Jack Pellow | "Fall at Your Feet" | Eliminated |
| 2.2 | Delta Goodrem | Adam Ladell | "Viva la Vida" | Instant Save |
| 2.3 | Jessie J | Ellen Reed | "Perfect" | Instant Save |
| 2.4 | The Maddens | Andrew Loadsman | "Love Runs Out" | Eliminated |
| 2.5 | Ronan Keating | Tash Lockhart | "Clarity" | Instant Save |
| 2.6 | Delta Goodrem | Alfie Arcuri | "All of Me" | Instant Save |

== Grand Finale ==
The Grand Finale was first broadcast on 10 July 2016. The Madden Brothers' band Good Charlotte performed their single "Life Can't Get Much Better" and girl band Fifth Harmony performed their single "All in My Head (Flex)".

- With Alfie Arcuri and Adam Ladell being Winner and Runner-up, respectively, Delta Goodrem became the first coach in the Australian version of the franchise to have two of her artists as Top 2.

Solo performances
| Order | Coach | Contestant | Song | Result |
|---|---|---|---|---|
| 1 | Jessie J | Ellen Reed | "Firework" by Katy Perry | Fourth place |
| 2 | Delta Goodrem | Adam Ladell | "Superheroes" by The Script | Runner-up |
| 5 | Delta Goodrem | Adam Ladell | "My Heart Stops with You" (Original song) | Runner-up |
| 3 | Ronan Keating | Tash Lockhart | "People Get Ready" by The Impressions | Third place |
| 4 | Delta Goodrem | Alfie Arcuri | "Catapult" by Jack Savoretti | Winner |
| 6 | Delta Goodrem | Alfie Arcuri | "Cruel" (Original song) | Winner |

Duet performances
| Order | Duet performers | | Song |
| Order | Coach | Contestant | Song |
|---|---|---|---|
| 1 | Delta Goodrem | Alfie Arcuri | "Beneath Your Beautiful" by Labrinth featuring Emeli Sandé |
| 2 | Ronan Keating | Tash Lockhart | "Don't Dream It's Over" by Crowded House |
| 3 | Jessie J | Ellen Reed | "Ain't Nobody" by Rufus and Chaka Khan |
| 4 | Delta Goodrem | Adam Ladell | "True Colors" by Cyndi Lauper |

Group performances
| Order | Performer | Song |
|---|---|---|
| 1 | Top 4 | "Sing" by My Chemical Romance |

Special guest performances
| Order | Performer/s | Song |
|---|---|---|
| 1 | Good Charlotte | "Life Can't Get Much Better" |
| 2 | Fifth Harmony | "All in My Head (Flex)" |

== Live Shows Elimination Chart ==
=== Overall ===
Artist's info

- Artist from Team Ronan
- Artist from Team Jessie
- Artist from Team Delta
- Artist from Team Madden

Result details

- Winner
- Runner-up
- Third place
- Fourth place
- Artist was saved by Instant Save (via App)
- Artist was immune to being eliminated
- Artist was in the bottom four
- Artist was saved by the public
- Artist was saved by his/her coach
- Artist was eliminated

Live show results per week
| Artist | Week 1 | Week 2 | Week 3 | Semi-Finals | | The Live Final |
| Artist | Week 1 | Week 2 | Week 3 | Sing-off | Top 6 | The Live Final |
|---|---|---|---|---|---|---|
| Alfie Arcuri | Safe | Safe | Bottom 4 | Safe | Safe | Winner |
| Adam Ladell | Safe | Safe | Safe | Immune | Safe | Runner-up |
| Tash Lockhart | Safe | Safe | Safe | Immune | Safe | 3rd Place |
| Ellen Reed | Safe | Safe | Bottom 4 | Safe | Safe | 4th Place |
| Andrew Loadsman | Safe | Safe | Safe | Immune | Eliminated | Eliminated in the Semi-Finals |
| Jack Pellow | Safe | Safe | Safe | Immune | Eliminated | Eliminated in the Semi-Finals |
| Aaliyah Warren | Safe | Safe | Bottom 4 | Eliminated | Eliminated in the Quarter-Finals | |
| Mitch Gardner | Safe | Safe | Bottom 4 | Eliminated | Eliminated in the Quarter-Finals | |
| Georgia Wiggins | Safe | Eliminated | Eliminated in Week 2 | | | |
| Kim Sheehy | Safe | Eliminated | Eliminated in Week 2 | | | |
| Lane Sinclair | Safe | Eliminated | Eliminated in Week 2 | | | |
| Mikaela Dean | Safe | Eliminated | Eliminated in Week 2 | | | |
| Brianna Holm | Eliminated | Eliminated in Week 1 | | | | |
| Elle Murphy | Eliminated | Eliminated in Week 1 | | | | |
| Emad Younan | Eliminated | Eliminated in Week 1 | | | | |
| Lexi Clark | Eliminated | Eliminated in Week 1 | | | | |

=== Team ===
Result details

- Winner
- Runner-up
- Third place
- Fourth place
- Artist was saved by Instant Save (via App)
- Artist was immune to being eliminated
- Artist was in the bottom four
- Artist was saved by his/her coach
- Artist was saved by public
- Artist was eliminated

Live show results per week
| Artist | Live Shows | | | | | The Live Finale |
| Artist | Week 1 | Week 2 | Week 3 | The Semi-Final | | The Live Finale |
| Artist | Week 1 | Week 2 | Week 3 | Bottom 4 | Top 6 | The Live Finale |
|---|---|---|---|---|---|---|
| Tash Lockhart | Safe | Safe | Safe | Immune | Safe | 3rd Place |
| Mitch Gardner | Safe | Safe | Bottom 4 | Eliminated | | |
| Georgia Wiggins | Safe | Eliminated | | | | |
| Emad Younan | Eliminated | | | | | |
| Ellen Reed | Safe | Safe | Bottom 4 | Safe | Safe | 4th Place |
| Jack Pellow | Safe | Safe | Safe | Immune | Eliminated | |
| Mikaela Dean | Safe | Eliminated | | | | |
| Brianna Holm | Eliminated | | | | | |
| Alfie Arcuri | Safe | Safe | Bottom 4 | Safe | Safe | Winner |
| Adam Ladell | Safe | Safe | Safe | Immune | Safe | Runner-up |
| Kim Sheehy | Safe | Eliminated | | | | |
| Elle Murphy | Eliminated | | | | | |
| Andrew Loadsman | Safe | Safe | Safe | Immune | Eliminated | |
| Aaliyah Warren | Safe | Safe | Bottom 4 | Eliminated | | |
| Lane Sinclair | Safe | Eliminated | | | | |
| Lexi Clark | Eliminated | | | | | |

== Ratings ==
The Voice season five consolidated viewership and adjusted position Colour key: – Highest rating during the season – Lowest rating during the season
| Episode | | Original airdate | Timeslot | Viewers (millions) | Night Rank | Source |
|---|---|---|---|---|---|---|
| 1 | "The Blind Auditions" | 1 May 2016 | Sunday 7:00 pm | 1.454 | #1 | |
| 2 | "The Blind Auditions" | 2 May 2016 | Monday 7:30 pm | 1.469 | #1 | |
| 3 | "The Blind Auditions" | 3 May 2016 | Tuesday 7:30 pm | 1.333 | #1 | |
| 4 | "The Blind Auditions" | 9 May 2016 | Monday 7:30 pm | 1.530 | #1 | |
| 5 | "The Blind Auditions" | 10 May 2016 | Tuesday 7:30 pm | 1.267 | #1 | |
| 6 | "The Blind Auditions" | 15 May 2016 | Sunday 7:00 pm | 1.449 | #1 | |
| 7 | "The Blind Auditions" | 16 May 2016 | Monday 7:30 pm | 1.366 | #1 | |
| 8 | "The Blind Auditions" | 22 May 2016 | Sunday 7:00 pm | 1.297 | #2 | |
| 9 | "The Blind Auditions" | 23 May 2016 | Monday 7:30 pm | 1.254 | #1 | |
| 10 | "The Battle Rounds" | 29 May 2016 | Sunday 7:00 pm | 1.386 | #2 | |
| 11 | "The Battle Rounds" | 30 May 2016 | Monday 7:30 pm | 1.209 | #2 | |
| 12 | "The Battle Rounds" | 5 June 2016 | Sunday 7:00 pm | 1.358 | #3 | |
| 13 | "The Super Battles" | 6 June 2016 | Monday 7:30 pm | 1.134 | #5 | |
| 14 | "The Live Shows" | 13 June 2016 | Monday 7:30 pm | 1.039 | #6 | |
| 15 | "The Live Shows" | 19 June 2016 | Sunday 7:00 pm | 1.105 | #4 | |
| 16 | "The Live Shows" | 26 June 2016 | Sunday 7:00 pm | 1.080 | #4 | |
| 17 | "Semi Final" | 3 July 2016 | Sunday 7:00 pm | 1.052 | #5 | |
| 18 | "Grand Finale" | 10 July 2016 | Sunday 7:00 pm | 1.207 | #4 | |
| 18 | "Winner Announced" | 10 July 2016 | Sunday 7:00 pm | 1.331 | #1 | |

== Trivia ==
- Alfie Arcuri and Ellen Reed were the first and last televised auditioners that year, and both managed to advance to the final four.
