= Alessandro Rütten =

Leo Dante
- Also known as: Sandro Nicolas, Sandro, Sammy Clay, Tyler, TYLR
- Born: Alessandro Heinrich Rütten; 4 October 1996 (age 30); Heinsberg, Germany
- Origin: Germany; United States; Greece
- Genre: Pop
- Occupation: Singer
- Instruments: Vocals; drums; guitar

Alessandro Heinrich Rütten (born 4 October 1996 in Heinsberg, Germany), formerly known by his stage names Sandro Nicolas, Sammy Clay, TYLR and currently Leo Dante, is a German singer-songwriter.

== Career ==
Rütten was born in Heinsberg, Germany, as Alessandro Rütten to a Greek-German mother and a German father. Part of his paternal family lives in the US. He was raised in Germany, where he started his career in music.

In 2018, as Alessandro Rütten, he participated in season 8 of The Voice of Germany (the German version of The Voice). He performed Shawn Mendes' "In My Blood" in the Blind Auditions, and all four coaches turned for him. He was eliminated in the Sing Off round.

In 2019, performing as Sandro Nicolas, he represented the United States in the New Wave competition in Sochi, Russia and finished in 5th place.

Later in 2019, he was internally selected by the Cypriot broadcaster CyBC to represent Cyprus in the Eurovision Song Contest 2020 in Rotterdam, Netherlands. He was due to perform the song "Running" under the mononym Sandro. However, the contest was later cancelled due to the COVID-19 pandemic and CyBC did not invite him back for 2021. In May 2020, he was part of the joint European broadcast of Eurovision: Europe Shine a Light.

In 2020, Rütten rebranded himself with the stage name Sammy Clay. In 2021, Rütten rebranded himself again with the stage name TYLR. In 2022, Rütten took on yet another stage name, this time calling himself Leo Dante.

== Discography ==
=== Singles ===
Single	Year	Album or EP
"Running" (as Sandro)	2020	Non-album singles
"Love Somebody" (as TYLR)	2021	Non-album singles
"Hollywood High"	2021	Non-album singles
"Adderall" (as Leo Dante)	2022	Non-album singles
"Better Off" (with Leon Brooks and Alphacast)	2023	Non-album singles
"Turn Off the Lights" (with Mike Perry)	2023	Non-album singles
"Fall From Grace" (with Erlandsson and Ten Times)	2023	Non-album singles
"The Other Side" (with Erlandsson and Ten Times)	2024	Non-album singles
"Medicine"	2025	Non-album singles

Preceded by Tamta with "Replay"	Cyprus in the Eurovision Song Contest; 2020 (cancelled)	Succeeded by Elena Tsagrinou with "El Diablo"
