= Paper plane (disambiguation) =

A paper plane is a toy airplane made out of paper.

Paper plane may also refer to:

== Music ==
- Paper Aeroplanes, an alternative pop band from West Wales formed around 2009
- Paper Airplane (album), a 2011 album by Alison Krauss & Union Station
- "Paper Plane" (song), a 1972 song by Status Quo
- "Paper Planes", a 2008 song by M.I.A.
- "Paper Planes" (Hoseah Partsch song), 2017
- Paper Aeroplane, an EP by Rosie Thomas
- "Paper Planes", a song by I'm from Barcelona from their 2008 album Who Killed Harry Houdini?
- "Paper Airplanes", a song by Ruth B. and Terrence Blanchard
- "Paper Airplanes (makeshift wings)", a song by alternative rock band AFI from the album Sing the Sorrow
- "Paper Aeroplane", a song by Angus & Julia Stone from their EP Chocolates and Cigarettes

== Other uses ==
- Paper Planes (film), a 2015 film
- Paper plane (cocktail), a cocktail named after the song by M.I.A.
- "Paper Airplane" (The Office), an episode of the American comedy television series The Office
- Paper Plane, a DSiWare game found in WarioWare, Inc.: Mega Microgames!
