= Hoseah Partsch =

- Born: Auckland, New Zealand
- Genre: Pop
- Occupations: Singer, songwriter
- Years active: 2017–present
- Label: Universal Music Australia

Hoseah Partsch is a New Zealand-Australian singer-songwriter who was the runner-up of the sixth series of The Voice Australia in 2017 behind the winner Judah Kelly. Partsch was signed to Universal Music Australia and released "Paper Planes" which peaked at number 35 on the ARIA charts. Partsch toured with Culture Club in 2017.

== Early life ==
Hoseah Partsch was born in Auckland, New Zealand as one of four children. He shared one bedroom with his siblings. The family moved to Australia at the end of 2011 and resides in Cranbourne West, Victoria, Australia and attended Dandenong High School. Partsch taught himself to play piano.

== Music career ==
=== 2017: The Voice ===
In 2017 Partsch auditioned for the sixth season of The Voice Australia. In his blind audition, all four chairs were turned and joined team Boy George. Partsch made it to the grand finale and ultimately placed runner-up. denotes runner-up. denotes a song that reached the top 10 on iTunes.

The Voice performances and results (2017)
Episode	Song	Original Artist	Result
Audition	"Almost Is Never Enough"	Ariana Grande ft. Nathan Sykes	Through to The Knockouts
The Knockouts	"Man in the Mirror"	Michael Jackson	Through to Battle Rounds
Battle Rounds	"Bridge over Troubled Water"	Simon & Garfunkel	Through to live shows
Live show 1	"Sorry Seems to Be the Hardest Word"	Elton John	Saved by public
Live show 2	"Everybody's Free (To Feel Good)"	Rozalla	Saved by public
Live show 3	"I Wish"	Stevie Wonder	Saved by public
Semi Final	"I Wanna Dance with Somebody (Who Loves Me)"	Whitney Houston	Saved by public
Semi Final	"Is This Love"	Bob Marley & The Wailers	Saved by public
Grand Final	"All of Me"	John Legend	Runner-up
Grand Final	"What a Wonderful World" (with Boy George)	Louis Armstrong	Runner-up
Grand Final	"Paper Planes"	Partsch	Runner-up

Immediately following the show, Partsch was signed to Universal Music Australia and released "Paper Planes". The song peaked at number 35 on the ARIA charts with 5147 sales.

Following the show, Boy George asked Partsch if he would join Culture Club on their national tour in December. Since October 2017, Partsch has modelled with menswear brand Johnny Bigg.

== Discography ==
=== Singles ===
Title	Year	Peak chart positions	Album
Title	Year	AUS	Album
"Paper Planes"	2017	35	TBA
"Mama" (Sean Brown featuring Hoseah Partsch)	2017	—	TBA
"—" denotes releases that did not chart or were not released.
