= Count On Me (album) =

Studio album by Judah Kelly
- Released: 28 July 2017
- Recorded: July 2017
- Genres: Pop, country
- Length: 41:41
- Label: Universal Music Australia

Judah Kelly chronology
Count On Me (2017)	Real Good Time (2018)

Singles from Count On Me
- 1. "Count On Me" Released: 2 July 2017; 2. "Kingdom Come" Released: 28 July 2017

Count On Me is the self-titled debut studio album by Judah Kelly, the winner of the sixth season of The Voice Australia. The album was released through Universal Music Australia on 28 July 2017. The album peaked at number three on the ARIA Albums Chart.

== Critical reception ==
Professional ratings
Review scores
Source	Rating
The Australian	2.5/5 stars

Emily Ritchie of The Australian said the album "contains a mixture of original tunes and covers, with an overwhelmingly Motown and country influence. The instrumental accompaniment is simple and repetitive, but this ensures Kelly’s voice is highlighted". Ritchie complemented "If I Go" but criticised the covers for "offer[ing] scant differences from the original tunes".

== Commercial performance ==
Count On Me debuted at number three on the ARIA Albums Chart with sales of 2,455 copies. In its second week, the album fell to number 18 with less than 900 copies sold.

== Track listing ==
No.	Title	Writer(s)	Length
1.	"Count On Me"	Peter James Harding	2:57
2.	"Kingdom Come"	Nancy Haas; Jordan Palmer; Andrew Wells	3:25
3.	"When I Get Back Home"	Harding; Judah Kelly	4:14
4.	"If I Go" (Ella Eyre song)	Natalia Hajjara; Ella McMahon; Jarrad Rogers	3:42
5.	"Tennessee Whiskey" (David Allan Coe song)	Dean Dillon; Linda Hargrove	5:00
6.	"You Woke Me Up"	Patrick Jason Matthews; Philip Norman; Alex Wasiliev	3:57
7.	"Take You Home"	Toby Chew Lee; Cameron Nacson; Chloe Papandrea; Jessica Porfiri	4:23
8.	"The Climb" (Miley Cyrus song)	Jessi Alexander; Jon Mabe	4:36
9.	"Either Way" (Chris Stapleton song)	Chris Stapleton; Tim James; Kendall Marvel	4:17
10.	"Tell Me Fool" (Vince Gill song)	Vince Gill; Pete Wasner	5:08

== Charts ==
Chart (2017)	Peak position
Australian Albums (ARIA)	3
Australian Country Albums (ARIA)	1

== Release history ==
Country	Date	Format	Label	Catalogue
Australia	28 July 2017	CD; digital download	Universal Music Australia	5784414
