= Dandenong High School =

- The heritage-listed main administration building

Location
- Princes Highway; Dandenong, Victoria, 3175; Australia; 37°58′45″S 145°12′33″E

Information
- Type: State school
- Motto: Latin: Faber Quisque Fortunae (Every person is the architect of their own destiny)
- Established: 1919
- Founder: Private P. C. W. Langford
- Principal: Susan Ogden
- Teaching staff: 165
- Years offered: 7–12
- Gender: Co-educational
- Enrolment: 1785
- Campus: Dandenong Site & Ann Street Site
- Houses: Banksia; Callistemon; Darwinia; Eucalyptus; Fern; Grevillea; Hakea
- Colours: Royal blue, light blue and red
- Song: We Shall Be Strong
- Athletics: Athletics; Swimming; Chorals
- Nickname: Dandy High
- Newspaper: Fortnightly
- Yearbook: The Gate
- Assoc. Principals: Katie Watmough & Mark Dewar
- Website: http://www.dandenonghs.vic.edu.au

Dandenong High School is one of the largest co-educational government secondary schools in Melbourne, Victoria, Australia, catering for students from Years 7 to 12. It is the oldest school, public or private, in Melbourne's outer east, and now has 1400 students alone on its Dandenong site on the north side of the Princes Highway. The historic façade of the Administration Building will remain, as it is heritage-listed and is a landmark of Dandenong.

At the start of 2007, Dandenong High School, Cleeland Secondary College and Doveton Secondary College officially merged to become the new Dandenong High School, as part of the Federal Government's Building the Education Revolution. As of 2017, the school has 165 teaching and 54 non-teaching staff, as well as 1785 students.

== History ==
Dandenong High School officially opened on 10 March 1919. It opened late due to the large outbreak of pneumonic influenza at the end of the First World War. When the school opened there were 104 students, and it was in temporary premises with the junior students housed at the Old Fire Station, and the senior students at the Temperance Hall and Church of Christ. The foundation stone of the Administration Building (A Block) was laid on 21 November 1919 and the school was officially opened in late 1920.

In 1920 the total student enrolment was 150, of which 60 students came from the Berwick, Pakenham, Garfield, Bunyip, Hallam, Lyndhurst, Cranbourne, Koo-Wee-Rup, Carnegie and Murrumbeena areas.

The first Headmaster of Dandenong High School was Percival Charles William Langford, who served in the 4th Light Horse Brigade of the First Australian Imperial Force and saw action in France and the Sinai and Palestine Campaign. He was invalided out of the Army in September 1916 suffering from typhoid, and then undertook recruitment work for the Army. Langford served at the school until 1934 when he transferred to Mildura, then to Frankston in 1937 where he worked until his retirement in 1948.

The colours of the school are those of Langford's Regiment, the 4th Light Horse, and are red and two shades of blue. The school crest was designed by the art mistress, D. McKinnon. In 1920 there were six houses – Bluegum, Clematis, Orchid, Wattle, Boronia and Waratah, though this was soon reduced to four with the loss of Boronia and Waratah. The names and colours of the houses were chosen by Dora Taylor, the senior mistress. With the regeneration of the school came seven brand new houses – Banksia, Callistemon, Eucalyptus, Hakea, Darwinia, Fern and Grevillea, all named after Australian flora.

In 2009, Dandenong High School celebrated its 90th anniversary. The Administration Building was renamed the Langford Building in 2010, where a plaque was placed at the building entrance in honour of the first Headmaster.

=== Ann Street Campus ===
The Ann Street Campus (37°58′40″S 145°12′48″E), formerly the Cleeland Secondary College (named after the nearby Cleeland Street), is situated about 200 m (660 ft) directly east of the Dandenong Main Campus, with the entrance down on Ann Street about halfway between Herbert Street and Cleeland Street, with a campus area about twice the size of the Dandenong main site. It was originally built in 1957 as a girls' school, the Dandenong Girls High School, with the motto Above Renown and the Olympic torch as its school logo to commemorate the Melbourne Olympics. The student population at Cleeland reflected the local cultural diversity and it was for some time the most ethnically diverse school in the state. The college established Literacy and Numeracy Centres to promote crucial educational skills to its mainstream and many special needs students. Cleeland Secondary College was the first school to offer, in conjunction with Chisholm Institute, the new Vocational Education Training (VET) course in Information Technology/Multimedia.

After the school merger, the original Cleeland school buildings will be demolished after Stage Two building works are complete. A new double-gymnasium, performing arts/drama centre, 350-seat auditorium and sporting ovals/fields will be constructed on the site, as part of the Stage 3 building works. The construction of a federally funded Language Centre is nearing completion on the Ann Street site.

=== Former Doveton Campus ===
The Victorian Education Department anticipated an increasing demand for technical school education in areas surrounding Dandenong when it decided to establish Doveton Technical School at the beginning of 1963. Temporarily housed in Dandenong Technical School, it began with 115 boys in Form 1. The new school, built in cement tile veneer on the 14.5-acre (59,000 m^{2}) site in Box Street, became available at the beginning of 1964. The Principal W. J. H. Smith was joined by a staff of six. The Parents' Association was led by W. Montagne as president and B. King as Secretary. The Chief Inspector of Technical Schools, J.L. Kepert. attended the inaugural meeting of the Advisory Council when Cr G.F. Knowles was elected president. On 5 April 1968 the Minister, the Hon. L.H.S. Thompson, MLC, officially opened the school of which the first three stages had been completed. Enrolments from 1963 to 1968 included students from Doveton (the area east of the Frankston-Dandenong Road), Narre Warren North, Beaconsfield, Pakenham East, Koo-Wee-Rup, Korumburra, Lang Lang and Cranbourne. Subsidised bus services, trains and school buses from Dandenong railway station brought children to Doveton. In 1967, girls' courses at Form 1 level were introduced.

The former Doveton Campus, or Doveton Secondary College officially closed down 1 December 2008. Doveton Campus students joined students on the Dandenong Site for the remainder of the 2008 school year. The buildings on the Doveton Campus have now been demolished. A new P-9 government school called Doveton College opened in 2012 1.5 km (0.93 mi) east of the old Doveton Secondary location.

=== Dandenong Education Precinct Project ===
The Dandenong Education Precinct Project is a major regeneration project funded under the Federal Government's Building the Education Revolution. The previous three separate schools were officially merged under the one name of Dandenong High School in 2007. The amalgamation of the campuses will cost the Victorian Government $45 million and will be completed in stages. Stage 1 of the building program was completed in early 2009, including the construction of Banksia, Darwinia and Callistemon Houses, and also the extension and refurbishment of the current Library Resource Centre. Stage 2 of the building program consisted of the constructing of the remaining 4 Houses: Fern, Hakea, Grevillea and Eucalyptus, as well as the construction of a Commonwealth-funded Language Centre on the Ann Street Site, costing $2 million. The school architecture designed by Hayball involves "green" and environmental aspects and incorporates Environmentally Sustainable Design (ESD) principles, including passive solar building design and natural light penetration.

Each House or SWIS (School-With-In-School) building houses 300 students and a core of 25 teachers. There are 50 students from each year level in each house. Students from years 7 through to year 12 are based in the same House for their whole six years of secondary schooling. From years 7 to 10, three teachers conduct a class of 50 students. However, because the new buildings can cater for both collaborative and independent learning, these classes usually break off into groups of 16–17 to one teacher. Thus, whilst Dandenong High School is one of the largest public schools in Australia, it also has one of the lowest student-to-teacher ratios. In years 11 and 12, however, class sizes are capped at 25 students to one teacher, due to the complexity of the VCE, VCAL and VET elective programs. The House buildings resemble a mini-school because of the administrative structure in each House. Each of the seven Houses is led by a House Leader (or Assistant Principal), along with an Assistant House Leader and a House Student Coordinator. An Attendance Officer/Receptionist assists with attendance and general tracking of student records. All seven Houses are overseen by the two Associate principals and the Principal.

Stage 3 of the building project, which is yet to be funded, will consist of a Performing Arts Centre, a 350-seat auditorium, additional Physical Education Centre (with a double-gymnasium), Fine Arts Wing, Design Technology Wing, Senior Chemistry/Physics Laboratories, Food Technology Centre, cafeteria, and Fabrics/Media/ICT Wing. Students will be based in their Houses for around 65% of the time, whilst specialty subjects such as Food Technology and Art will be conducted in their respective wings and buildings. The first half of Stage 3, totalling $10M, was funded in the 2011-12 State Budget, and the second half of Stage 3, totalling $9.4M, was funded in the 2012-13 State Budget.

The new Alkira Secondary College in Cranbourne North and William Ruthven Secondary College in Reservoir are following a similar architectural concept as Dandenong High School with the SWIS approach.

== Houses ==
=== Former Houses ===
Dandenong High School Houses (1920–2008)
Bluegum	Clematis	Orchid	Wattle
Green	Blue	Purple	Yellow

Cleeland Secondary College Houses (1957–2007)
Cuthbert	Landy	Marshall	Strickland
-	-	-	-

=== New Houses ===
The new Dandenong High School Houses, or Learning Centres, are named after Australian native plants. These Houses are also the same student bodies used for school curricular activities, such as sporting and music chorals events. The seven new houses, which consist of 300 students each, are:

Dandenong High School Houses (2009–present)
Banksia	Callistemon	Darwinia	Eucalyptus	Fern	Grevillea	Hakea
Orange	Red	Burgundy	Blue	Green	Purple	Yellow

== Grounds, buildings and facilities ==
Dandenong High School is spread across two sites in Dandenong, the main Princes Highway Campus and the Ann Street Campus. The Princes Highway Campus comprises is split into the following blocks: Administration Block or Langford Building (built in 1919), Banksia House (built in 2009), Callistemon House (built in 2009), Darwinia House (built in 2009), Eucalyptus House (built in 2010), Fern House (built in 2010), Grevillea House (built in 2010), Hakea House (built in 2010), R Block (built in 2000 and consisting of a Gymnasium and music rooms), a Library Resource Centre and a Careers Resource Centre.

The Ann Street Campus comprises the old buildings from the former Cleeland Secondary College as well as football fields and basketball courts. A Language Centre is currently being built on the site, and when Stage 3 is complete, the Ann Street Campus will comprise a Physical Education Centre (with double gymnasium), a 350-seat auditorium, Performing Arts Centre, and extra sporting fields. The Princes Highway will also have a Fine Arts Wing, Design Technology Wing, Senior Chemistry/Physics Laboratories, Food Technology Centre, Cafeteria, and Fabrics/Media/ICT Wing as part of Stage 3.

== Media/Awards ==
In August 2009, Dandenong High School, in conjunction with its architect Hayball Pty Ltd and interior designer Mary Featherson, received an award from the Victorian Chapter of the Council of Educational Facility Planners International. The school obtained the award for Best New Construction/Major Facility. In October 2009, Dandenong High School received two major awards in the Government's School Design Awards. The awards won by the school were Best Overall School Design and Best Secondary School. Education Minister Bronwyn Pike said that, "The awards showcase innovative building design that reflects the 21st Century learning occurring in our Victorian schools". She also said that "Leading architect Hayball pushed the boundaries with its design of this outstanding Victorian school".

== Notable alumni ==
- Pone Fa'amausili, rugby union player
- Louis Garlick, politician
- Joe Hildebrand, journalist, television and radio presenter
- Eve Langley, novelist and poet
- David Leyonhjelm, Liberal Democratic Senator for NSW
- Hoseah Partsch, singer-songwriter
- Donnell Ryan, Federal Court judge
- Jackson Taylor, Labor MLA for Bayswater
- Adam Treloar, Australian Football League player for Western Bulldogs

== Notable staff ==
- Barry Jones
