= Trust Myself =

Single by Sam Perry
- Released: 17 June 2018
- Recorded: 2018
- Length: 3:00
- Label: Universal Music Australia

Sam Perry singles chronology
"Choir Boy" (2018)	"Trust Myself" (2018)	"Looking for Light" (2018)

"Trust Myself" is the winner's single by season seven winner of The Voice Australia, Sam Perry. It was released digitally immediately after he was announced as the winner on 17 June 2018. Perry co-wrote "Trust Myself", unlike the previous winners of The Voice, who have had a single allocated to them by the label.

== Chart performance ==
"Trust Myself" debuted on the ARIA Singles Chart at number 78 with 2,414 sales.

== Charts ==
Chart (2018)	Peak position
Australia (ARIA)	78
