= Real Good Time (Judah Kelly album) =

Studio album by Judah Kelly
- Released: 5 October 2018
- Length: 48:50
- Label: Universal Music Australia

Judah Kelly chronology
Count On Me (2017)	Real Good Time (2018)

Singles from Real Good Time
- 1. "Real Good Time" Released: 10 August 2018; 2. "Found" Released: 5 October 2018

Real Good Time is the second studio album by Australian singer Judah Kelly. The album was released through Universal Music Australia on 5 October 2018.

Upon release Kelly said "For me it is about setting up an actual career now. For me this is the first album. It's not just The Voice Australia winning dude, it's a Judah Kelly album." When asked to describe the music on the album, he said "I would say this album is a blend of country and blues I guess. The last album was too country for a pop audience and too pop for a country audience. With this one there's no doubt where it sits."

== Track listing ==
No.	Title	Writer(s)	Length
1.	"Found"	Anthony Smith	3:39
2.	"Real Good Time"	Gary Harrison; Chris Stapleton	3:12
3.	"2 Million Miles"	Kevin Bennett	3:10
4.	"Ain't No Thing"	John Scott Sherrill; Stapleton	3:49
5.	"What Not to Do"	Rodney Clawson; Josh Thompson; Craig Wiseman	3:22
6.	"Don't Kick Me When I'm Down"	Will Kimbrough	3:25
7.	"Call It a Night"	Jeb Gipson; Lynn Hutton; Clint Lagerberg	3:41
8.	"Strangers Like Us"	Matt Chase; Gipson	3:33
9.	"I Can't Think"	Tony Martin; Mark Nesler; Jimmy Wayne	3:27
10.	"I'll Come Running"	Zach Crowell; Jerry Flowers; Jonathan Singleton	3:21
11.	"Tucker's Daughter"	Ian Moss; Don Walker	4:08
12.	"Nothing Makes Sense"	Peter James Harding; Judah Kelly	4:04
13.	"House on the Hill"	Kevin Bennett	5:03

== Charts ==
Chart (2018)	Peak position
Australian Physical Albums (ARIA)	38
Australian Digital Albums (ARIA)	34
Australian Country Albums (ARIA)	11

== Release history ==
Country	Date	Format	Label	Catalogue
Australia	5 October 2018	CD; digital download	Universal Music Australia	6774535
