= Count On Me (Judah Kelly song) =

Single by Judah Kelly

from the album Count On Me
- Released: 2 July 2017
- Recorded: 2017
- Genre: Pop, Country Soul
- Length: 2:57
- Label: Universal Music Australia
- Songwriter: Peter James Harding

Judah Kelly singles chronology
"Count On Me" (2017)	"Kingdom Come" (2017)

"Count On Me" is the debut and winner's single by season six winner of The Voice Australia, Judah Kelly. It was released digitally immediately after he was announced the winner on 2 July 2017, as the lead single from his debut studio album, Count On Me.

== Charts ==
"Count On Me" debuted on the ARIA Charts at number 19 with 7,980 sales, becoming the Voice Australia's most successful winner's single in four years.

Chart (2017)	Peak position
Australia (ARIA)	19
