= The Chronicles of a Serial Idealist =

Studio album by Charley
- Released: 17 April 2026
- Length: 38:42
- Label: EMI Australia
- Producers: Harry Charles; Lukas Costas; Anton Engdahl; The Nocturns; Nightly; Ben Stancombe; Oskar Widén

Charley chronology
Timebombs (2024)	The Chronicles of a Serial Idealist (2026)

Singles from The Chronicles of a Serial Idealist
- 1. "Cherries" Released: 26 September 2025; 2. "Limerence" Released: 21 November 2025; 3. "Serial Idealist" Released: 30 January 2026; 4. "Bite My Tongue" Released: March 2026; 5. "Other Side of the Room" Released: 17 April 2026

The Chronicles of a Serial Idealist is the debut studio album by the Australian pop singer Charley. The album was announced in January 2026, released on 17 April 2026 and peaked at number 23 on the ARIA Charts.

The album was going to be called Tunnel Vision, but in an interview with The Music upon release, Charley said she landed on something that felt far more fitting, saying "I wanted my album to feel bigger than just music, it's felt like a whole chunk of my life that's been separated into chapters... I was just going through so many different titles, and the one thing that really stuck with me was being an 'idealist' And then I wanted it to sound a little bit crazy, so 'serial idealist' came to me."

== Reception ==
Simon Kelesidis from Future Mag said "With production styles that are both sonically cohesive to Australian pop and yet also leave room for creating soundscapes to immerse the listener into the story, she pairs it with lyrical content that takes a peek into her psyche and also leaves songs open ended, very rarely disclosing the genders of her muses, creating an accessible album while also remaining unapologetically queer."

Sarah Duggan from The Music said "At its core, it's a catchy pop record with big, fun tracks and surprisingly intricate instrumentation. The longer you sit with it, though, you'll notice that there's a depth to it that slowly reveals itself and lets you in piece by piece." Duggan added "Upbeat, euphoric choruses sit alongside more restrained, reflective verses, creating a constant sense of movement from the highs to the lows."

Rachel Bissett from Scottish Music Network described it as "an emotionally charged project that offers an honest and romantic interpretation of reclaiming your own strength, the heartbreaks of idealism, as well as the tension between holding on and the power in letting go."

Chris Rutherford from PopMatters said "The Chronicles of a Serial Idealist, is an impressive exercise in mind over matter, in which Charley weaves a 12-track tapestry of enchanted poptimism to counteract very real pain."

== Track listing ==
The Chronicles of a Serial Idealist track listing
No.	Title	Writer(s)	Producer(s)	Length
1.	"Muscle Memory"	Claire Howell; Harry Charles; Ned Houston	Charles	3:02
2.	"Limerence"	Howell; Louise Udin; Oskar Widén	Widén	2:40
3.	"Serial Idealist"	Howell; Charles; Houston	Charles	3:08
4.	"Other Side of the Room"	Howell; Charles; Houston	Charles	3:28
5.	"Bite My Tongue"	Howell; Joseph Housley; Charlie Martin	The Nocturns	3:55
6.	"Lil Rockstar"	Howell; Joey Beretta; Jonathan Capeci; Nicholas Sainato	Nightly	3:18
7.	"Cherries"	Howell; Tommy "TBHits" Brown; Lukas Costas; Houston; Sissy Smith	Costas; Brown^{[a]}	3:13
8.	"Boys Scare Me"	Howell; Adam Argyle; Ben Stancombe	Stancombe	2:52
9.	"Used to You Two"	Howell; Christoffer Collins; Anton Engdahl	Engdahl	3:10
10.	"Liar"	Howell; Charles; Houston	Charles	2:49
11.	"Man on the Moon"	Howell; Charles; Houston	Charles	3:13
12.	"The End of Everything"	Howell; Houston; Jordan Shulman; Whakaio Taahi	Charles	3:52
Total length:				38:42

=== Note ===
- ^{^[a]} indicates an additional producer

== Personnel ==
Credits are adapted from the album's liner notes.

- Charley – performance
- Geoff Swan – mixing (tracks 1–8, 10–12)
- Anton Engdahl – mixing (9)
- Matt Cahill – mixing assistance
- Dale Becker – mastering
- Adam Burt – mastering assistance
- Katie Harvey – mastering assistance
- Noah McCorkle – mastering assistance (7)

== Charts ==
Chart performance for The Chronicles of a Serial Idealist
Chart (2026)	Peak position
Australian Albums (ARIA)	23
