= Sam Perry (looping artist) =

Australian singer and looping artist

- Born: Samuel Nicholas Perry; 18 September 1989 (age 36)
- Origin: Perth, Western Australia
- Occupations: Singer, looping artist
- Years active: 2018–present
- Label: Universal Music Australia

Sam Perry (born 18 September 1989) is an Australian singer and looping artist best known for winning the seventh series of The Voice Australia in 2018. Sam Perry has not posted on social media since 2021.

== Career ==
=== 2013–2017 ===
In early 2013 Perry was scouted for Onyx Productions' live theatre stunt show 360 Allstars – Urban Circus. The show toured Australia with over 76 performances before continuing its success in Germany with a near-sold out 25-show tour.

In February 2014, Perry premièred a non-stop vocal soundscape titled The World Is.. at the Perth Fringeworld Festival. The show was awarded a four-star review from The West Australian and the Fringeworld Music Award of 2014.

In 2017, Perry performed at the Fringe Festival for the fourth consecutive year.

=== 2018: The Voice ===
In 2018, Perry took part in the seventh season of The Voice Australia, where he auditioned with "When Doves Cry" and joined Kelly Rowland's team. His audition sparked controversy throughout the competition, with some viewers and judge Boy George questioning whether his sample-based approach complies with essentially a singing competition. Perry progressed through the various stages to the final and was announced the winner on 17 June 2018. His debut single on Universal Records titled "Trust Myself" was released immediately after the show.

denotes winner. denotes a song that reached the top 10 on iTunes.

The Voice performances and results (2018)
Episode	Song	Original Artist	Result
Audition	"When Doves Cry"	Prince	Through to The Knockouts
The Knockouts	"Survivor"	Destiny's Child	Through to Battle Rounds
Battle Rounds	"Sympathy for the Devil"	The Rolling Stones	Through to live shows
Live show 1	"Smells Like Teen Spirit"	Nirvana	Saved by public
Live show 2	"Like a Prayer"	Madonna	Saved by public
Live show 3	"Gangsta's Paradise"	Coolio ft. L.V.	Saved by public
Semi Final	"Bohemian Rhapsody"	Queen	Saved by public
Grand Final	"Praise You"/ "Stronger"	Fatboy Slim x Kanye West	Winner
Grand Final	"They Don't Care About Us" (with Kelly Rowland)	Michael Jackson	Winner
Grand Final	"Trust Myself"	Perry	Winner

In August 2018, Perry announced details for a 9-date national tour commencing in Melbourne on 16 November 2018. Perry said "My new music is coming together well, I have a lot to do and more to learn, but it's exciting. I can't wait to tour Australia and show everyone what I have been working on."

In November 2018, Perry released "Looking for Light", a song created in collaboration with Melbourne music dynamo Dub FX and lyrically pokes at our obsession with image and what others think of us.

== Discography ==
=== Singles ===
Title	Year	Peak chart positions	Album
Title	Year	AUS	Album
"Stepping Stones"	2018	—	Non-album singles
"Choir Boy"	2018	—	Non-album singles
"Trust Myself"	2018	78	Non-album singles
"Looking for Light"	2018	—	Non-album singles
"—" denotes releases that did not chart or were not released.

=== As a featured artist ===
List of singles as featured artist
Title	Year
"Wandering Strangers" (Black & Blunt featuring Sam Perry and MC Coppa)	2013

Preceded by Judah Kelly	The Voice winner 2018	Succeeded by Diana Rouvas
