= Charley (singer) =

Australian pop singer

- Born: Claire Howell; Gold Coast, Australia
- Origin: Gold Coast, Australia, Australia
- Genre: Pop
- Occupations: Singer; songwriter
- Instrument: Vocals
- Years active: 2016–present
- Label: EMI Music Australia
- Website: www.emimusic.com.au/charley/

Claire Howell (born 16 September 1997), professionally known as Charley, is a Sydney-based, Australian singer and songwriter. She is best known for entering The Voice Australia in 2016 and 2017 and for winning the Vanda & Young Global Songwriting Competition Unpublished Australasian Songwriter Award/ Emerging Songwriter Prize in 2022 and 2024.

== Early life ==
Howell grew up in a musical family on the Gold Coast, Australia.

== Career ==
=== The Voice ===
In 2016, Howell auditioned for season five of The Voice Australia, and chose to sing coach Jessie J's "Who You Are" in her blind audition, where she received a four chair turn and joined team Jessie J. She was defeated in the first of the Battle rounds.

The Voice performances and results (2016)
| Episode | Song | Original Artist | Result |
|---|---|---|---|
| Audition | "Who You Are" | Jessie J | Through to battle rounds |
| Battle Rounds | "Unconditionally" | Katy Perry | eliminated |

In 2017, Howell returned for season six of The Voice Australia and sang coach Seal's "Crazy" for her blind audition. After another four chair turn, Howell coach team Delta Goodrem and made it to the last of the live shows before being eliminated in 9th or 10th place.

The Voice performances and results (2017)
| Episode | Song | Original Artist | Result |
|---|---|---|---|
| Audition | "Crazy" | Seal | Through to the knockouts |
| Knockouts | "Let Me Love You" | DJ Snake featuring Justin Bieber | Through to battle rounds |
| Battle Rounds | "Rise" | Katy Perry | Through to the live shows |
| Live Shows (top 12) | "Into You" | Ariana Grande | Saved by public / Through to top 11 |
| Live Shows (top 11) | "Symphony" | Clean Bandit featuring Zara Larsson | Saved by public / Through to top 10 |
| Live Shows (top 10) | "Stay" | Zedd and Alessia Cara | bottom three |
| Live Shows (top 10) | "Secret Love Song" | Little Mix featuring Jason Derulo | eliminated 9th or 10th |

Following The Voice, Howell relocated to Sydney and was signed to EMI Music Australia in 2020 changing her performing name to Charley.

=== 2021-present ===
On 5 March 2021, Charley release for her debut single, "Hard for Me", about the "rush" felt upon seeing her boyfriend after getting back together with him. In an interview with The Music, she described her music as "very pop [...] [like a] Katy Perry crossover with Julia Michaels."

In 2022, Charley entered "I Suck At Being Lonely" into Eurovision – Australia Decides with the intend to represent Australia at the Eurovision Song Contest. She came 4th out of 11 contestants.

She won the Emerging Songwriter Prize at the 2022 Vanda & Young Global Songwriting Competition saying, "I'm so stoked to have won this award – this song means so much to me as it's my first queer song and having had so much support from my fans and music community/industry after coming out means the world. This song came from such a sad moment in my life so having some type of reward for it is very bittersweet."

Charley's debut EP, Timebombs was released on 23 June 2023. At the 2023 ARIA Music Awards, the EP was nominated for Michael Gudinski Breakthrough Artist.

In January 2026, Charley announced the forthcoming release of debut album The Chronicles of a Serial Idealist. Upon announcement, Charley said, "This album captures some of the most defining moments of my life so far, and releasing it feels equal parts exhilarating and terrifying. Where Timebombs came from, trying to hold things together as they fell apart, this record is about finding hope in the mess - being honest, reflective, and learning to let go."

== Discography ==
=== Albums ===
List of albums, with selected details
| Title | Details | Peak chart positions |
| Title | Details | AUS |
|---|---|---|
| The Chronicles of a Serial Idealist | Released: 17 April 2026; Format: LP, digital, CD; Label: EMI, UMA (5767993) | 23 |

=== Extended plays ===
List of EPs, with selected details
| Title | Details |
|---|---|
| Timebombs | Released: 23 June 2024; Format: digital; Label: EMI, UMA |

== Awards and nominations ==
=== ARIA Awards ===
The ARIA Music Awards is an annual award ceremony event celebrating the Australian music industry.

| Year | Nominee / work | Award | Result | Ref. |
|---|---|---|---|---|
| 2023 | Timebombs | Michael Gudinski Breakthrough Artist | Nominated | |

=== Vanda & Young Global Songwriting Competition ===
The Vanda & Young Global Songwriting Competition is an annual competition that "acknowledges great songwriting whilst supporting and raising money for Nordoff-Robbins" and is coordinated by Albert Music and APRA AMCOS. It commenced in 2009.

| Year | Nominee / work | Award | Result | Ref. |
|---|---|---|---|---|
| 2022 | "Worst Taste in Girls" (co-written with Anthony Egizii and David Musumeci) | Emerging Songwriter Prize | Won | |
| 2024 | "Timebomb" (co-written with Anton Engdahl and Kristin Carpenter) | Unpublished Australasian Songwriter Award | Won | |
| 2025 | "Man On the Moon" (co-written with Ned Houston and Harry Charles) | Emerging Global Songwriter Awards | Finalist | |
