= The Voice (Australian TV series) season 7 =

The Voice
- Season 7
- Promotional poster featuring coaches Rowland, Boy George, Goodrem, and Jonas
- Hosted by: Sonia Kruger
- Coaches: Boy George; Kelly Rowland; Delta Goodrem; Joe Jonas
- Winner: Sam Perry
- Winning coach: Kelly Rowland
- Runner-up: Bella Paige

Release
- Original network: Nine Network
- Original release: 15 April – 17 June 2018

Season chronology
- ← Previous; Season 6 Next → Season 8

The seventh season of The Voice began airing on 15 April 2018, although it was originally scheduled to debut on 16 April 2018. The coaching line-up consisted of returning coaches Delta Goodrem, returning for her sixth season, Boy George and Kelly Rowland, both returning for their second, and new addition Joe Jonas, replacing Seal.

Sam Perry from Team Kelly won the competition on 17 June 2018, marking Rowland's first win as a coach.

== Coaches and hosts ==
Coaches and Host of The Voice Season 7

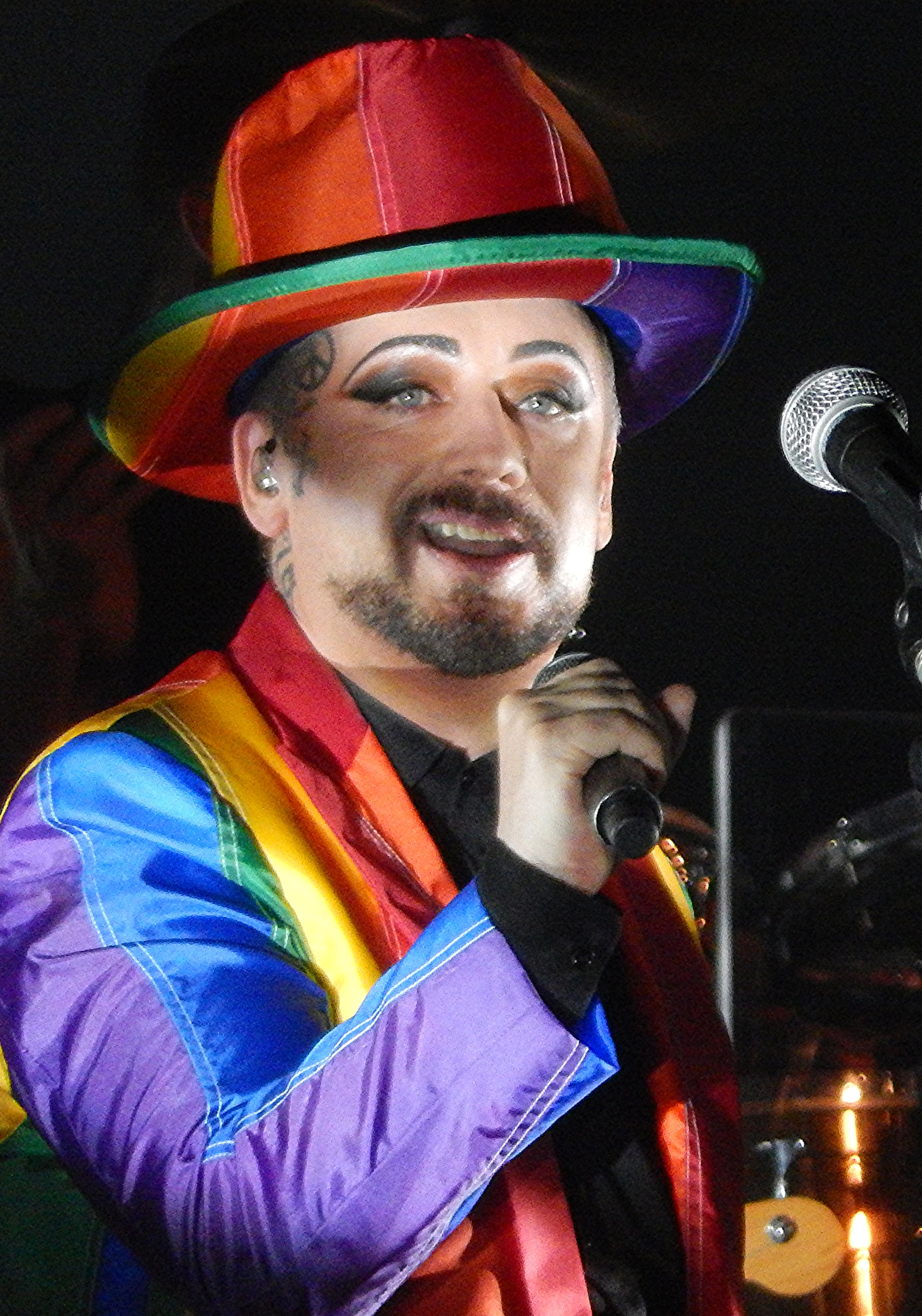
Boy George

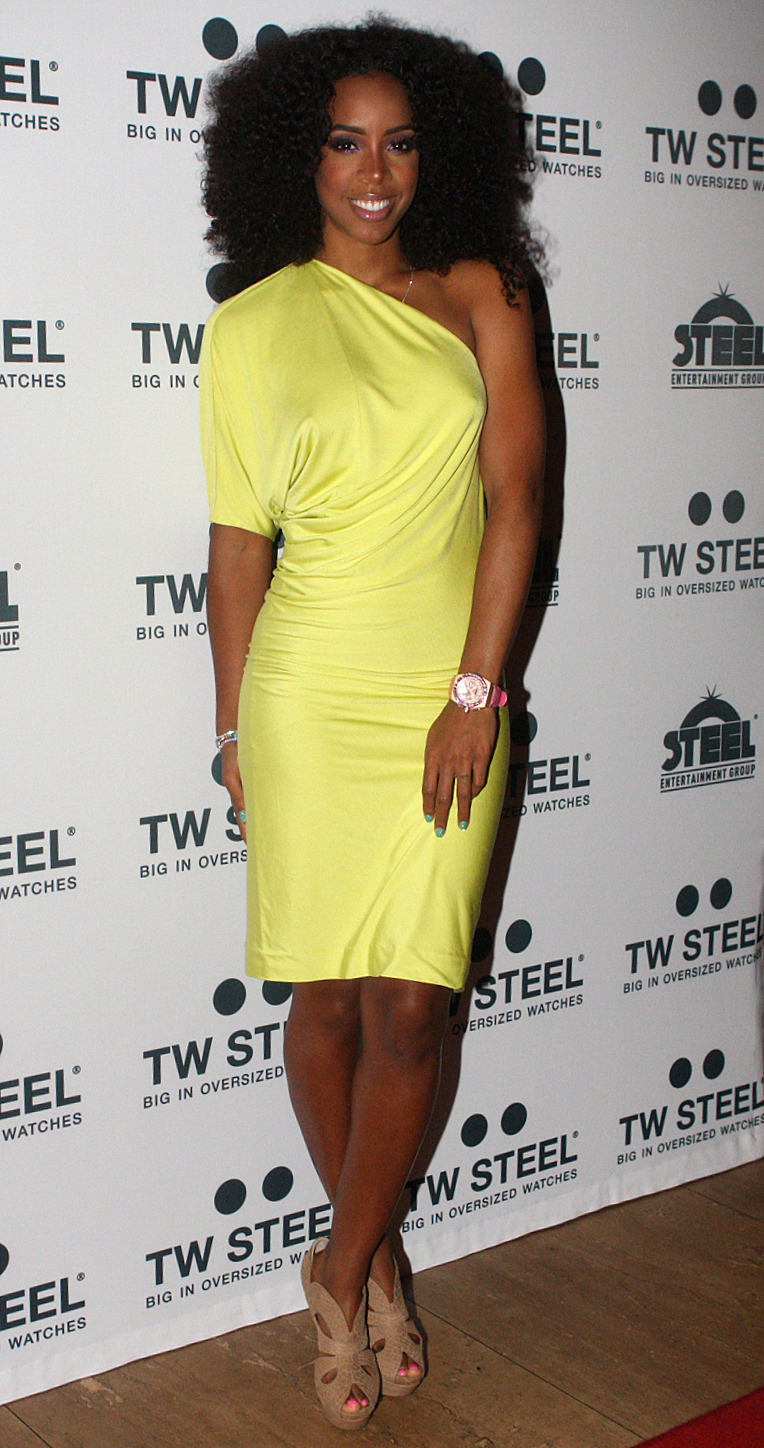
Kelly Rowland

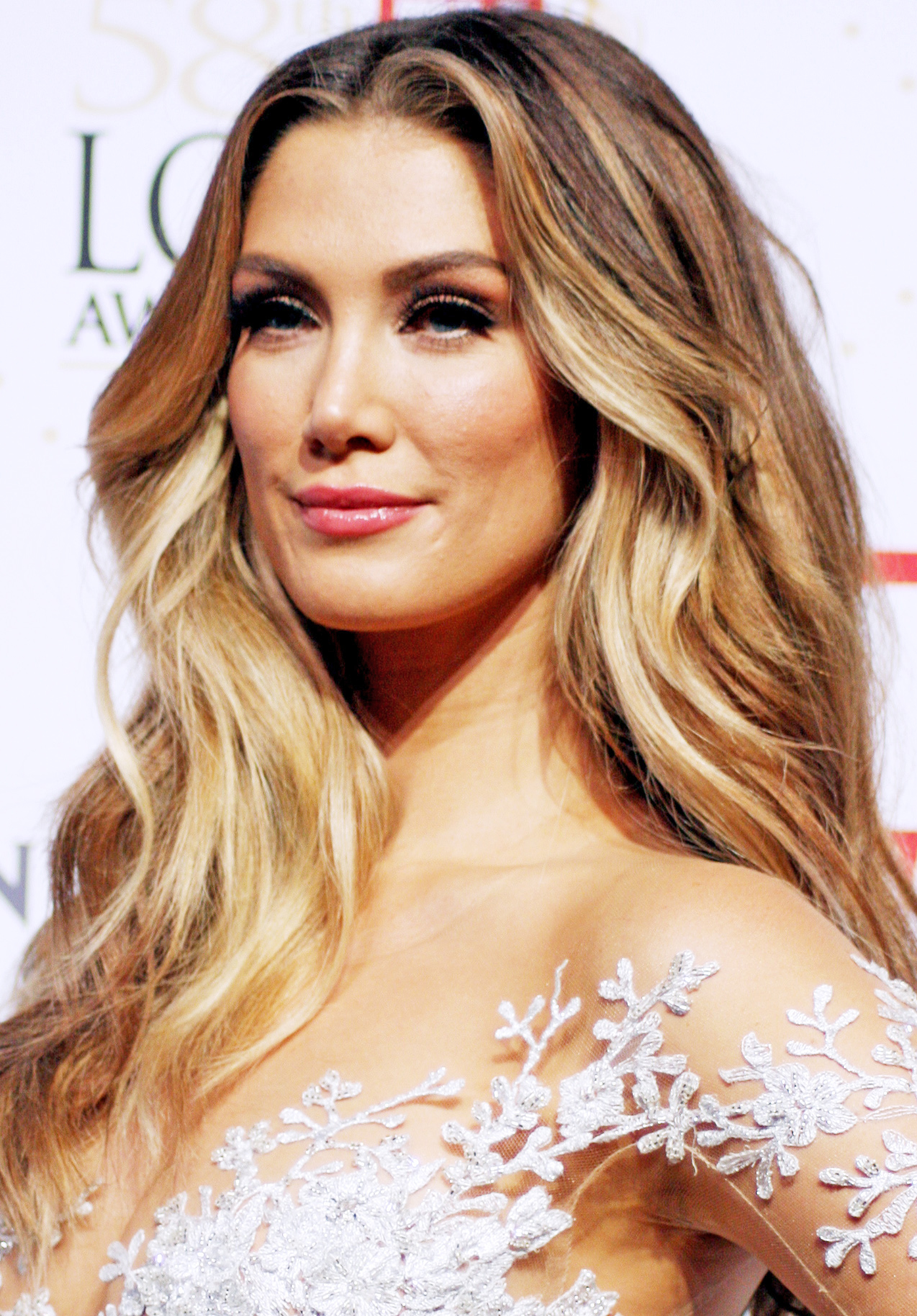
Delta Goodrem

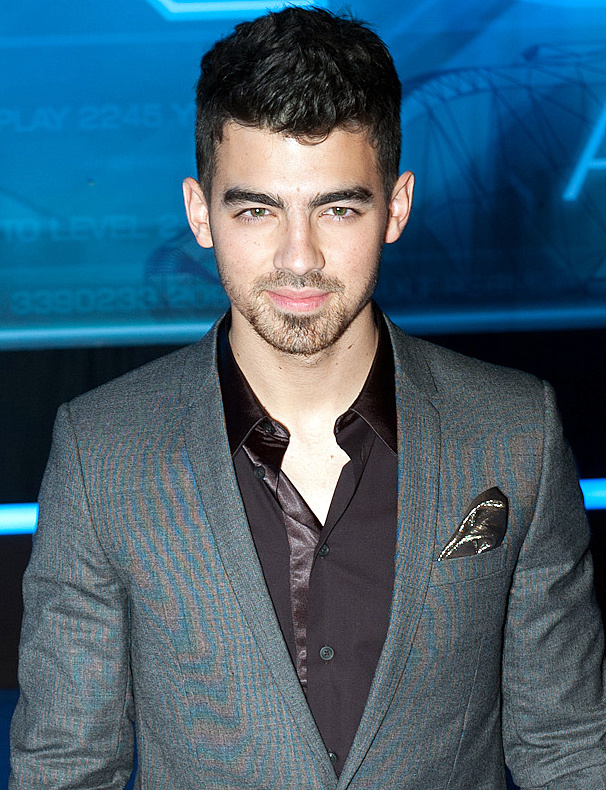
Joe Jonas

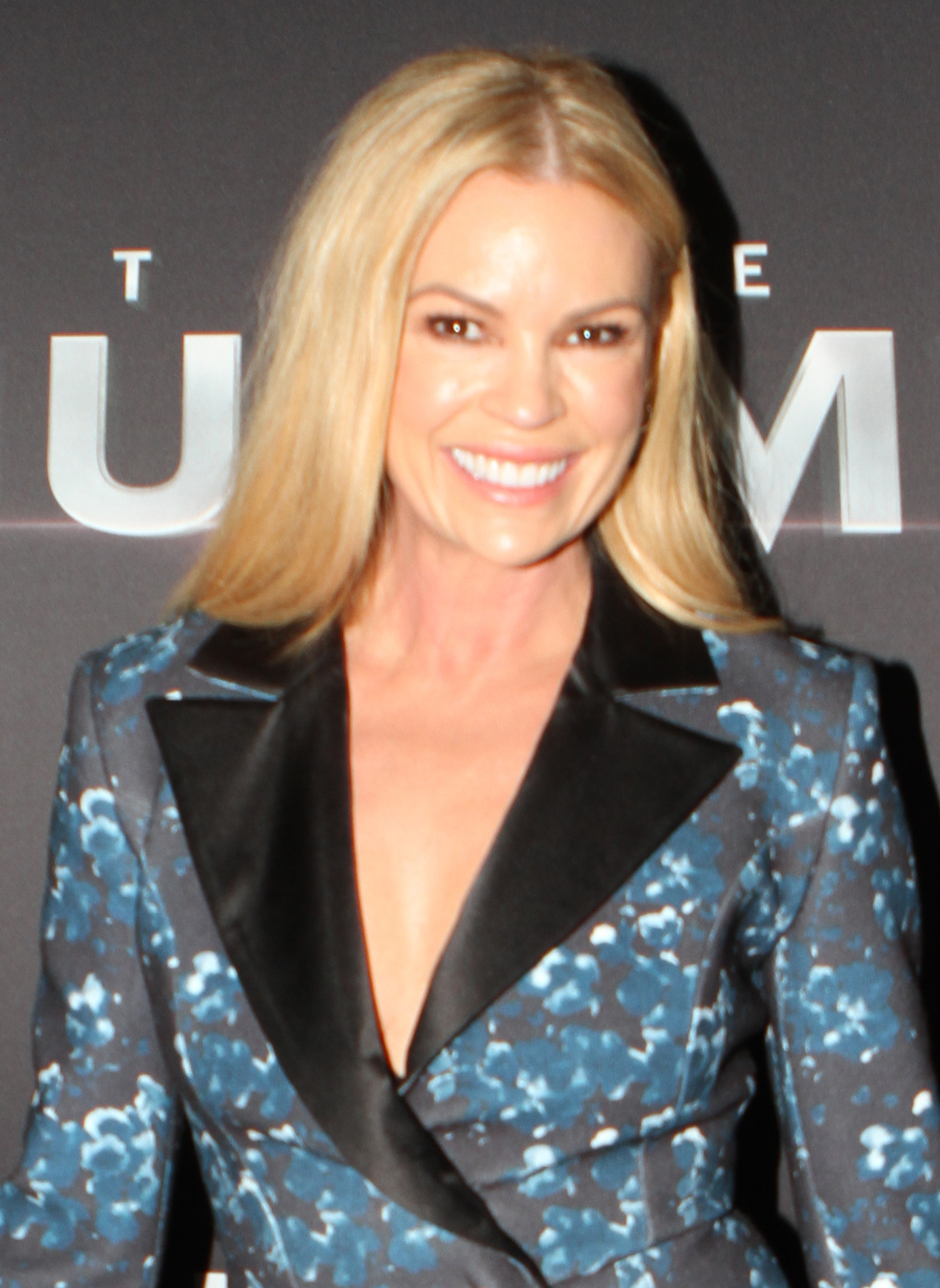
Sonia Kruger

On 11 October 2017, the series was renewed for a seventh season and it was announced that Goodrem, George and Rowland would all return. On 14 December 2017, Nine announced Joe Jonas would replace Seal as the fourth judge for the seventh season. This is also the first season to feature only one Australian coach on the panel.

== Teams ==
Color key

- Winner
- Runner-up
- Third place
- Fourth place
- Eliminated in the Live shows
- Eliminated in the Wildcard round
- Eliminated in the Battle rounds
- Artist was stolen in the Knockout rounds
- Eliminated in the Knockout rounds

Coach	Top 48				
Boy George					
Boy George	Sheldon Riley	Chang Po Ching	Luke Antony	Mikayla Jade	Aunty Ora
Boy George	Maddison McNamara	~~Leo Abisaab~~	Chrislyn Hamilton	René Le Feuvre	Colin Lillie
Boy George	Michelle Cashman	Emma Fitzgerald	Jackie Ramsay	Joel Wiggins	
Kelly Rowland					
Kelly Rowland	Sam Perry	Bella Paige	AP D'Antonio	Brock Ashby	Erin Whetters
Kelly Rowland	Jackson Parfitt	~~Somer Smith~~	~~Madi Krstevski~~	Lacey Madison	Jake Nicholls
Kelly Rowland	Hannah Pearce	Emily Green	Ricky Nifo	Seanny Millar	
Delta Goodrem					
Delta Goodrem	Ben Clark	Trent Bell	Jacinta Gulisano	Nathan Brake	Josh Richards
Delta Goodrem	Somer Smith	~~Aunty Ora~~	~~Mikayla Jade~~	Tayla Thomas	Aja Elshaikh
Delta Goodrem	Holly Summers-Clarke	Tim Karkowski	Oskar Proy	Aimee Hannan	
Joe Jonas					
Joe Jonas	Aydan Calafiore	Sally Skelton	Ben Sekali	Homegrown	Leo Abisaab
Joe Jonas	Madi Krstevski	~~Jackson Parfitt~~	~~Josh Richards~~	~~AP D'Antonio~~	Zoe Tsagalis
Joe Jonas	Clint Posselt	Liv Bevan	Pete McCredie	Anyerin Drury	
Note: Italicized names are stolen artists (names struck through within former teams).

== Blind auditions ==
Colour key

✔	Coach hit the "I WANT YOU" button
	Artist defaulted to this team
	Artist elected to join this team
	Artist eliminated with no coach pressing "I WANT YOU" button
	Artist received an 'All Turn'.

=== Episode 1 (15 April) ===
The coaches performed a cover of "Heroes" together at the start of the show.

Order	Artist	Age	Song	Coaches and artists choices			
Order	Artist	Age	Song	George	Kelly	Delta	Joe
1	Mikayla Jade	18	"Dancing On My Own"	✔	✔	✔	✔
2	Aydan Calafiore	17	"Despacito"	✔	✔	✔	✔
3	Homegrown	15-21	"Fast Car"	✔	✔	✔	✔
4	Jacinta Gulisano	24	"Came Here for Love"	✔	—	✔	—
5	Lauren Greco	21	"Ain't No Other Man"	—	—	—	—
6	Erin Whetters	28	"And I Am Telling You I'm Not Going"	✔	✔	✔	✔

=== Episode 2 (16 April) ===
Order	Artist	Age	Song	Coaches and artists choices			
Order	Artist	Age	Song	George	Kelly	Delta	Joe
1	Jake Nicholls	24	"You're Nobody 'til Somebody Loves You"	✔	✔	✔	✔
2	Somer Smith	19	"His Eye Is On The Sparrow"	✔	✔	✔	✔
3	Emily Hespe	17	"I Will Survive"	—	—	—	—
4	Jackson Parfitt	19	"Toothbrush"	—	—	✔	✔
5	Ben Clark	33	"Caruso"	✔	✔	✔	✔
6	Ashley McTackett	28	"Redneck Woman"	—	—	—	—
7	Sheldon Riley	19	"Do You Really Want to Hurt Me"	✔	✔	✔	✔

=== Episode 3 (17 April) ===
Order	Artist	Age	Song	Coaches and artists choices			
Order	Artist	Age	Song	George	Kelly	Delta	Joe
1	Chang Po Ching	26	"Shout"	✔	✔	✔	✔
2	David McCredie	23	"Castle on the Hill"	—	—	—	—
3	Pete McCredie	19	"Blame It on Me"	✔	✔	✔	✔
4	Madi Krstevski	17	"The One That Got Away"	✔	✔	—	—
5	René Le Feuvre	19	"I Like Me Better"	✔	—	—	—
6	Kelly Peterson	18	"How Far I'll Go"	—	—	—	—
7	Sally Skelton	19	"Wolves"	✔	✔	✔	✔

=== Episode 4 (22 April) ===
Order	Artist	Age	Song	Coaches and artists choices			
Order	Artist	Age	Song	George	Kelly	Delta	Joe
1	Bella Paige	16	"Praying"	✔	✔	✔	✔
2	Tim Karkowski	24	"Coming Home"	✔	✔	✔	—
3	Josh Richards	15	"I'll Be There"	✔	✔	✔	✔
4	Luke Antony	27	"Stole The Show"	✔	✔	✔	✔
5	Amy Reeves	19	"Halo"	—	—	—	—
6	James Oxley	17	"Cold Water"	—	—	—	—
7	Sam Perry	28	"When Doves Cry"	✔	✔	✔	✔

=== Episode 5 (23 April) ===
Order	Artist	Age	Song	Coaches and artists choices			
Order	Artist	Age	Song	George	Kelly	Delta	Joe
1	Chrislyn Hamilton	27	"(You Make Me Feel Like) A Natural Woman"	✔	—	✔	✔
2	Liv Bevan	19	"Goodbye Yellow Brick Road"	—	✔	✔	✔
3	Shikye Smith	-	"I Wanna Dance with Somebody"	—	—	—	—
4	Rachel Constanzo	-	"Your Song"	—	—	—	—
5	Abel Firew	-	"Sun Comes Up"	—	—	—	—
6	Jordi Davis	20	"Cake by the Ocean"	—	—	—	—
7	Oskar Proy	18	"Asturias, Patria Querida"	—	—	✔	✔
8	Seanny Millar	33	"If You Could Only See"	—	✔	—	—
9	Jordynne Emmett	20	"Scared to Be Lonely"	—	—	—	—
10	Ricky Nifo	29	"I Can't Make You Love Me"	✔	✔	✔	✔

=== Episode 6 (24 April) ===
Order	Artist	Age	Song	Coaches and artists choices			
Order	Artist	Age	Song	George	Kelly	Delta	Joe
1	Brock Ashby	24	"Use Somebody"	✔	✔	—	✔
2	Tayla Thomas	23	"Let It Go"	✔	✔	✔	✔
3	Virginia Mann	22	"You Oughta Know"	—	—	—	—
4	Leo Abisaab	14	"Chain of Fools"	✔	—	✔	—
5	Jake Daulby	25	"Way Down We Go"	—	—	—	—
6	Zoe Tsagalis	20	"Liability"	—	✔	✔	✔
7	Aunty Ora	35	"One and Only"	✔	✔	✔	✔

=== Episode 7 (25 April) ===
Order	Artist	Age	Song	Coaches and artists choices			
Order	Artist	Age	Song	George	Kelly	Delta	Joe
1	Anyerin Drury	31	"Chandelier"	—	✔	✔	✔
2	Aja Elshaikh	15	"Different Worlds"	✔	✔	✔	✔
3	Jackie Ramsay	52	"Rock and Roll"	✔	—	—	—
4	Sax Bates	18	"Perfect"	—	—	—	—
5	Tony Trimboli	22	"I Took a Pill in Ibiza"	—	—	—	—
6	Holly Summers-Clarke	28	"Sitting on Top of the World"	✔	—	✔	—
7	Paris Wells	35	"Upside Down"	—	—	—	—
8	Colin Lillie	44	"Father and Son"	✔	—	—	✔

=== Episode 8 (29 April) ===
Order	Artist	Age	Song	Coaches and artists choices			
Order	Artist	Age	Song	George	Kelly	Delta	Joe
1	Lacey Madison	17	"Wicked Game"	✔	✔	✔	—
2	Mason Hope	18	"Bloodstone"	—	—	—	—
3	Nathan Brake	26	"Jealous"	—	✔	✔	✔
4	Aimee Hannan	29	"Help!"	—	—	✔	✔
5	Erica Padilla	-	"One Last Time"	—	—	—	—
6	Phoenix Keating	-	"Back to Black"	—	—	—	—
7	Steph Lambell	-	"We Found Love"	—	—	—	—
8	AP D'Antonio	35	"Mr. Tambourine Man"	—	—	—	✔
9	Hannah Pearce	16	"Can't Help Falling in Love"	—	✔	—	—

=== Episode 9 (30 April) ===
Order	Artist	Age	Song	Coaches and artists choices			
Order	Artist	Age	Song	George	Kelly	Delta	Joe
1	Clint Posselt	22	"Malibu"	✔	✔	✔	✔
2	Emma Fitzgerald	27	"Piece by Piece"	✔	—	✔	—
3	Tajana Turkovic	37	"I Put a Spell On You"	—	—	—	—
4	Emily Green	21	"Edge of Seventeen" / "Bootylicious"	—	✔	—	—
5	Michelle Cashman	35	"Landslide"	✔	Team full	—	✔
6	Lara Dabbagh	15	"Rise Up"	—	Team full	—	—
7	Joel Wiggins	27	"Bridge Over Troubled Water"	✔	Team full	✔	—

=== Episode 10 (1 May) ===
Order	Artist	Age	Song	Coaches and artists choices			
Order	Artist	Age	Song	George	Kelly	Delta	Joe
1	Sophie Fraser	19	"Ex's and Oh's"	—	Team full	—	—
2	Trent Bell	27	"Always"	✔	Team full	✔	✔
3	Zain Mitchlan	23	"Strong"	—	Team full	Team full	—
4	Sophie Swarbrick	17	"When We Were Young"	—	Team full	Team full	—
5	Ben Sekali	24	"A Change Is Gonna Come"	—	Team full	Team full	✔
6	Gemma Nha	17	"Nessun Dorma"	—	Team full	Team full	Team full
7	Lachlan Gergaghty	27	"Lay Me Down"	—	Team full	Team full	Team full
8	Maddison McNamara	23	"I Will Always Love You"	✔	Team full	Team full	Team full

== The Knockouts ==
The first episode of the knockouts aired on 6 May 2018. Each knockout round pits 3 artists from the same team against each other, with only one act winning each round. The judges also get two 'steals' each for the entirety of the knockouts, which allows them to steal a rejected act from another team.

Color key

– Contestant wins knockout round
– Contestant loses knockout round but gets saved/advances
– Contestant loses knockout round and is eliminated

=== Episode 11 (6 May) ===
Order	Coach	Theme	Winner		Losers		'Steal' result			
Order	Coach	Theme	Artist	Song	Artists	Song	George	Kelly	Delta	Joe
1	Joe	Ariana Grande	Aydan Calafiore	"Side to Side"	Jackson Parfitt	"Into You"	—	✔	—	N/A
1	Joe	Ariana Grande	Aydan Calafiore	"Side to Side"	Josh Richards	"One Last Time"	—	—	✔	N/A
2	Delta	P!nk	Jacinta Gulisano	"What About Us"	Aimee Hannan	"Beautiful Trauma"	—	—	N/A	—
2	Delta	P!nk	Jacinta Gulisano	"What About Us"	Mikayla Jade	"Nobody Knows"	✔	—	N/A	—
3	George	Soul Greats	Chang Po Ching	"Try a Little Tenderness"	Joel Wiggins	"At Last"	N/A	—	—	—
3	George	Soul Greats	Chang Po Ching	"Try a Little Tenderness"	Jackie Ramsay	"Piece of My Heart"	N/A	—	—	—
4	Joe	Demi Lovato	Sally Skelton	"Skyscraper"	Anyerin Drury	"Stone Cold"	—	—	—	N/A
4	Joe	Demi Lovato	Sally Skelton	"Skyscraper"	Pete McCredie	"Cool For The Summer"	—	—	—	N/A
5	Kelly	Lady Gaga	Brock Ashby	"Million Reasons"	Hannah Pearce	"The Cure"	—	N/A	—	—
5	Kelly	Lady Gaga	Brock Ashby	"Million Reasons"	Lacey Madison	"Joanne"	—	N/A	—	—

=== Episode 12 (7 May) ===
Order	Coach	Theme	Winner		Losers		'Steal' result			
Order	Coach	Theme	Artist	Song	Artists	Song	George	Kelly	Delta	Joe
1	Kelly	Girl Groups	Sam Perry	"Survivor"	Madi Krstevski	"Shout Out to My Ex"	—	N/A	—	✔
1	Kelly	Girl Groups	Sam Perry	"Survivor"	Emily Green	"Say You'll Be There"	—	N/A	—	—
2	George	Amy Winehouse	Luke Antony	"Love Is a Losing Game"	Emma Fitzgerald	"Back to Black"	N/A	—	—	—
2	George	Amy Winehouse	Luke Antony	"Love Is a Losing Game"	Leo Abisaab	"Valerie"	N/A	—	—	✔
3	Joe	Boy Bands	Ben Sekali	"I Want You Back"	Liv Bevan	"I Want It That Way"	—	—	—	Team full
3	Joe	Boy Bands	Ben Sekali	"I Want You Back"	AP D'Antonio	"Across The Universe"	—	✔	—	Team full
4	Delta	Ed Sheeran	Trent Bell	"I See Fire"	Oskar Proy	"Supermarket Flowers"	—	Team full	N/A	Team full
4	Delta	Ed Sheeran	Trent Bell	"I See Fire"	Tim Karkowski	"Shape Of You"	—	Team full	N/A	Team full
5	George	Storytellers	Maddison McNamara	"The Sound of Silence"	Michelle Cashman	"Make You Feel My Love"	N/A	Team full	—	Team full
5	George	Storytellers	Maddison McNamara	"The Sound of Silence"	Colin Lillie	"Fire and Rain"	N/A	Team full	—	Team full
6	Kelly	Bruno Mars	Bella Paige	"It Will Rain"	Somer Smith*	"Versace On The Floor"	—	Team full	✔	Team full
6	Kelly	Bruno Mars	Bella Paige	"It Will Rain"	Ricky Nifo	"Finesse"	—	Team full	—	Team full

- Joe wanted to steal Somer as well, but it was edited as if Joe's team was already full and Somer joined Team Delta on default.

=== Episode 13 (8 May) ===
Order	Coach	Theme	Winner		Losers		'Steal' result			
Order	Coach	Theme	Artist	Song	Artists	Song	George	Kelly	Delta	Joe
1	Delta	Katy Perry	Nathan Brake	"Part of Me"	Holly Summers-Clarke	"Unconditionally"	—	Team full	Team full	Team full
1	Delta	Katy Perry	Nathan Brake	"Part of Me"	Aja Elshaikh	"Wide Awake"	—	Team full	Team full	Team full
2	Joe	One Direction Members	Homegrown	"Sweet Creature"	Clint Posselt	"Slow Hands"	—	Team full	Team full	Team full
2	Joe	One Direction Members	Homegrown	"Sweet Creature"	Zoe Tsagalis	"Dusk Till Dawn"	—	Team full	Team full	Team full
3	Kelly	Michael Jackson	Erin Whetters	"Who's Loving You"	Seanny Millar	"Smooth Criminal"	—	Team full	Team full	Team full
3	Kelly	Michael Jackson	Erin Whetters	"Who's Loving You"	Jake Nicholls	"They Don't Care About Us"	—	Team full	Team full	Team full
4	Delta	Stage and Screen	Ben Clark	"Bring Him Home"	Aunty Ora	"Circle of Life"	✔	Team full	Team full	Team full
4	Delta	Stage and Screen	Ben Clark	"Bring Him Home"	Tayla Thomas	"Colors of the Wind"	—	Team full	Team full	Team full
5	George	Cher	Sheldon Riley	"Believe"	Chrislyn Hamilton	"If I Could Turn Back Time"	Team full	Team full	Team full	Team full
5	George	Cher	Sheldon Riley	"Believe"	René Le Feuvre	"I Got You Babe"	Team full	Team full	Team full	Team full

== Battle rounds ==
The first episode of the Battle Rounds was first broadcast on 13 May 2018.

Color key

– Contestant wins battle round and advances
– Contestant loses battle round and is eliminated
– Contestant was chosen to be a wildcard and lost
– Contestant was chosen to be a wildcard and won

=== Episode 14 (13 May) ===
Order	Coach	Winner	Battle Song	Loser
1	Joe	Aydan Calafiore	"Uptown Funk"	Madi Krstevski
2	George	Sheldon Riley	"Diamonds"	Mikayla Jade
3	Delta	Jacinta Gulisano	"How Will I Know"	Somer Smith
4	Kelly	Brock Ashby	"Waves"	Jackson Parfitt
5	George	Luke Antony	"Ain't Nobody (Loves Me Better)"	Maddison McNamara
6	Kelly	Sam Perry	"Sympathy for the Devil"	AP D'Antonio

=== Episode 15 (14 May) ===
Order	Coach	Winner	Battle Song	Loser
1	Delta	Ben Clark	"I Want To Know What Love Is"	Nathan Brake
2	Joe	Sally Skelton	"The Chain"	Homegrown
3	Delta	Trent Bell	"There's Nothing Holdin' Me Back"	Josh Richards
4	George	Chang Po Ching	"With a Little Help From My Friends"	Aunty Ora
5	Joe	Ben Sekali	"One Last Song"	Leo Abisaab
6	Kelly	Bella Paige	"Sorry Not Sorry"	Erin Whetters

== The Live Shows ==
=== Episode 16 (20 May) ===
The first episode of the Live shows was first broadcast on 20 May 2018.

Order	Coach	Contestant	Song	Result
Top 13 performances
1	Joe	Sally Skelton	"Spectrum"	Saved by public
2	Boy George	Chang Po Ching	"Happy"	Saved by public
3	Kelly	AP D'Antonio	"I'm on Fire"	Saved by public
4	Delta	Jacinta Gulisano	"End of Time"	Saved by public
5	Kelly	Brock Ashby	"Too Good at Goodbyes"	Bottom two
6	Joe	Aydan Calafiore	"Can't Feel My Face"	Saved by public
7	Delta	Trent Bell	"The Horses"	Saved by public
8	Joe	Ben Sekali	"Say Something"	Saved by public
9	Boy George	Sheldon Riley	"Creep"	Saved by public
10	Boy George	Luke Antony	"Livin' la Vida Loca"	Bottom two
11	Kelly	Bella Paige	"Never Enough"	Saved by public
12	Delta	Ben Clark	"The Prayer"	Saved by public
13	Kelly	Sam Perry	"Smells Like Teen Spirit"	Saved by public
Sing-off performances
2.1	Boy George	Luke Antony	"Impossible"	Eliminated
2.2	Kelly	Brock Ashby	"Sex on Fire"	Instant Save

=== Episode 17 (27 May) ===
Order	Coach	Contestant	Song	Result
Top 12 performances
1	Joe	Aydan Calafiore	"Wanna Be Startin' Somethin'"	Saved by public
2	Delta	Jacinta Gulisano	"For You"	Bottom two
3	Kelly	AP D'Antonio	"Gold on the Ceiling"	Saved by public
4	George	Chang Po Ching	"Jealous"	Saved by public
5	Kelly	Bella Paige	"No Tears Left to Cry"	Saved by public
6	Delta	Ben Clark	"This Is the Moment"	Saved by public
7	Kelly	Sam Perry	"Like a Prayer"	Saved by public
8	Delta	Trent Bell	"In My Blood"	Saved by public
9	Joe	Ben Sekali	"Signed, Sealed, Delivered I'm Yours"	Saved by public
10	Kelly	Brock Ashby	"Attention"	Bottom two
11	Joe	Sally Skelton	"Fix You"	Saved by public
12	George	Sheldon Riley	"Scars to Your Beautiful"	Saved by public
Sing-off performances
2.1	Kelly	Brock Ashby	"Rolling in the Deep"	Eliminated
2.2	Delta	Jacinta Gulisano	"One Night Only"	Instant Save

=== Episode 18 (3 June) ===
Order	Coach	Contestant	Song	Result
Top 11 performances
1	George	Sheldon Riley	"Born This Way"	Saved by public
2	Kelly	AP D'Antonio	"I Will Wait"	Bottom three
3	Delta	Jacinta Gulisano	"Shake It Off"	Bottom three
4	Joe	Sally Skelton	"I Miss You"	Saved by public
5	Delta	Ben Clark	"Nessun Dorma"	Saved by public
6	Joe	Ben Sekali	"Call Out My Name"	Saved by public
7	Kelly	Bella Paige	"Chandelier"	Saved by public
8	George	Chang Po Ching	"Johnny B. Goode"	Saved by public
9	Delta	Trent Bell	"You're The Voice"	Bottom three
10	Joe	Aydan Calafiore	"You Are the Reason"	Saved by public
11	Kelly	Sam Perry	"Gangsta's Paradise"	Saved by public
Sing-off performances
1	Kelly	AP D'Antonio	"The House of the Rising Sun"	Eliminated
2	Delta	Trent Bell	"Iris"	Instant Save
3	Delta	Jacinta Gulisano	"The Winner Takes It All"	Eliminated

== The Semi-Finals ==
The semi-finals was first broadcast on 10 June 2018. At the end of this episode, four artists will advance to the grand final, while the other five will be eliminated.

With the eliminations of Trent Bell and Ben Clark, Delta Goodrem had no more contestants left on her team, making this the third season in the Australian version of the franchise where a coach didn't have a contestant in the grand finale. This was also the second season in which Goodrem did not have an act in the grand finale.

Sheldon Riley was originally given "Girls Just Want to Have Fun"; however, during rehearsals, Boy George changed it to "Rise".

Order	Coach	Contestant	Song	Result
1	George	Sheldon Riley*	"Rise"	Saved by public
2	Joe	Ben Sekali	"24K Magic"	Eliminated
3	Kelly	Bella Paige	"All by Myself"	Saved by public
4	Delta	Trent Bell	"Don't Stop Believin'"	Eliminated
5	Joe	Sally Skelton	"Life on Mars"	Eliminated
6	George	Chang Po Ching	"Love On Top"	Eliminated
7	Delta	Ben Clark	"Come What May"	Eliminated
8	Joe	Aydan Calafiore	"Pray for Me"	Saved by public
9	Kelly	Sam Perry	"Bohemian Rhapsody"	Saved by public

== Grand Finale ==
The Grand Finale was first broadcast on 17 June 2018.

- With Sam Perry and Bella Paige being the Winner and Runner-up, respectively, Kelly Rowland became the second coach in the Australian version of the franchise to have two of her artists as the Top 2, the first being Delta Goodrem in the fifth season. Only female coaches have had this distinction.
- After winning season 5 and 6, Delta didn’t have an artist from her team in the Grand Finale for the second time in her 6 seasons on the show, the first being in season 4.

Solo performances
Order	Coach	Contestant	Song	Result
3	George	Sheldon Riley	"Young and Beautiful" by Lana Del Rey	Third Place
5	Kelly	Bella Paige	"Greatest Love of All" by Whitney Houston	Runner-up
N/A	Kelly	Bella Paige	"Changing" (Original Song)	Runner-up
9	Joe	Aydan Calafiore	"Runaway Baby" by Bruno Mars	Fourth Place
10	Kelly	Sam Perry	"Praise You" / "Stronger" by Fatboy Slim / Kanye West	Winner
N/A	Kelly	Sam Perry	"Trust Myself" (Original Song)	Winner

Duet performances
Order	Duet performers		Song
Order	Coach	Contestant	Song
2	Kelly	Sam Perry	"They Don't Care About Us" by Michael Jackson
4	Joe	Aydan Calafiore	"Shut Up and Dance" by Walk the Moon
6	George	Sheldon Riley	"Sweet Dreams" by Eurythmics
7	Kelly	Bella Paige	"Last Dance" by Donna Summer

Group performances
Order	Performer	Song
1	Top 4	"This Is Me"

Special guest performances
Order	Performer/s	Song
8	Calum Scott	"You Are the Reason" / "Dancing On My Own"
11	DNCE	"TV in the Morning" / "Cake by the Ocean"

== Live Shows Elimination Chart ==
=== Overall ===
Artist's info

- Artist from Team George
- Artist from Team Kelly
- Artist from Team Delta
- Artist from Team Joe

Result details

- Winner
- Runner-up
- Third place
- Fourth place
- Artist was saved by Instant Save (via App)
- Artist was saved by the public
- Artist was saved by Wildcard
- Immune
- Artist was eliminated

Live show results per week
Artist	Week 1		Week 2	Week 3	Semi-Final	The Live Final
Artist	Wildcard	Top 13	Week 2	Week 3	Semi-Final	The Live Final
Sam Perry	Immune	Safe	Safe	Safe	Safe	Winner
Bella Paige	Immune	Safe	Safe	Safe	Safe	Runner-up
Sheldon Riley	Immune	Safe	Safe	Safe	Safe	3rd Place
Aydan Calafiore	Immune	Safe	Safe	Safe	Safe	4th Place
Ben Clark	Immune	Safe	Safe	Safe	Eliminated	Eliminated (Semi-Finals)
Ben Sekali	Immune	Safe	Safe	Safe	Eliminated	Eliminated (Semi-Finals)
Chang Po Ching	Immune	Safe	Safe	Safe	Eliminated	Eliminated (Semi-Finals)
Sally Skelton	Immune	Safe	Safe	Safe	Eliminated	Eliminated (Semi-Finals)
Trent Bell	Immune	Safe	Safe	Safe	Eliminated	Eliminated (Semi-Finals)
AP D'Antonio	Safe	Safe	Safe	Eliminated	Eliminated (Week 3)	
Jacinta Gulisano	Immune	Safe	Safe	Eliminated	Eliminated (Week 3)	
Brock Ashby	Immune	Safe	Eliminated	Eliminated (Week 2)		
Luke Antony	Immune	Eliminated	Eliminated (Week 1)			
Homegrown	Eliminated	Eliminated (Wildcard)				
Mikayla Jade	Eliminated	Eliminated (Wildcard)				
Nathan Brake	Eliminated	Eliminated (Wildcard)				

=== Team ===
Result details

- Winner
- Runner-up
- 3rd place
- 4th place
- Artist was saved by Instant Save (via App)
- Artist was saved by public
- Artist was saved by Wildcard
- Immune
- Artist was eliminated

Live show results per week
Artist	Live Shows					The Live Finale
Artist	Week 1		Week 2	Week 3	The Semi-Final	The Live Finale
Artist	Wildcard	Top 13	Week 2	Week 3	The Semi-Final	The Live Finale
Sheldon Riley	Immune	Safe	Safe	Safe	Safe	3rd Place
Chang Po Ching	Immune	Safe	Safe	Safe	Eliminated	
Luke Antony	Immune	Eliminated				
Mikayla Jade	Eliminated					
Sam Perry	Immune	Safe	Safe	Safe	Safe	Winner
Bella Paige	Immune	Safe	Safe	Safe	Safe	Runner-up
AP D'Antonio	Safe	Safe	Safe	Eliminated		
Brock Ashby	Immune	Safe	Eliminated			
Ben Clark	Immune	Safe	Safe	Safe	Eliminated	
Trent Bell	Immune	Safe	Safe	Safe	Eliminated	
Jacinta Gulisano	Immune	Safe	Safe	Eliminated		
Nathan Brake	Eliminated					
Aydan Calafiore	Immune	Safe	Safe	Safe	Safe	4th Place
Ben Sekali	Immune	Safe	Safe	Safe	Eliminated	
Sally Skelton	Immune	Safe	Safe	Safe	Eliminated	
Homegrown	Eliminated					

== Contestants who appeared on previous shows or seasons ==
- Aydan Calafiore originally auditioned for season 6, but no coach turned their chair during his audition. He was previously a cast member of the 2012 reboot of Network Ten's Young Talent Time. He also auditioned on Australia's Got Talent in 2013.
- Sally Skelton originally auditioned for season 6, where she was eliminated during the battles.
- Bella Paige was in the Top 3 of season 1 of The Voice Kids Australia. She also represented Australia at Junior Eurovision Song Contest 2015.
- Brock Ashby was part of Moorhouse, a boy band which came fourth on the first season of The X Factor New Zealand.
- Nathan Brake was on the seventh season of Australian Idol where he came fourth.
- Jacinta Gulisano was on the fifth season of The X Factor Australia, as a member of the band THIRD D3GREE, that finished in fourth place.
- Tajana Turkovic was on the second season of The Voice Croatia (Najljepši glas Hrvatske) where she was eliminated during the battle rounds.
- Chrislyn Hamilton competed on the sixth season of ‘‘Australian Idol’’, where she placed fifth. She later appeared on ‘’Australia’s Got Talent’’ and also performed in Creative Generation – State Schools Onstage.
- Emma Fitzgerald originally auditioned for season 6, but no coach turned their chair during her audition.
- Michelle Cashman originally auditioned for season 2, but no coach turned their chair during her audition. She also appeared on the first season of Australian Idol where she was a semi-finalist.
- Trent Bell was on the fourth season of The X Factor, as a member of The Collective, where they came third. He also auditioned for the seventh season of Australian Idol.
- Gemma Nha competed on season 1 of The Voice Kids Australia and reached top 15.
- Maddison McNamara originally auditioned for season 5, where she was eliminated during the super battles.
- Sheldon Riley appeared in Creative Generation – State Schools Onstage in 2016 on Network 10, and was later a contestant on the eighth season of ‘‘The X Factor’’ as a member of Time and Place, who were eliminated on the first live show.

== Ratings ==
Colour key:
– Highest rating during the season
– Lowest rating during the season

The Voice season seven consolidated viewership and adjusted position
Episode		Original airdate	Timeslot	Viewers (millions)	Night Rank	Source
1	"The Blind Auditions"	15 April 2018	Sunday 7:00 pm	1.072	5	
2	"The Blind Auditions"	16 April 2018	Monday 7:30 pm	0.979	7	
3	"The Blind Auditions"	17 April 2018	Tuesday 7:30 pm	0.865	6	
4	"The Blind Auditions"	22 April 2018	Sunday 7:00 pm	1.166	3	
5	"The Blind Auditions"	23 April 2018	Monday 7:30 pm	0.980	5	
6	"The Blind Auditions"	24 April 2018	Tuesday 7:30 pm	0.911	2	
7	"The Blind Auditions"	25 April 2018	Wednesday 7:30 pm	1.011	4	
8	"The Blind Auditions"	29 April 2018	Sunday 7:00 pm	1.108	3	
9	"The Blind Auditions"	30 April 2018	Monday 7:30 pm	0.953	6	
10	"The Blind Auditions"	1 May 2018	Tuesday 7:30 pm	1.075	3	
11	"The Knockout Rounds"	6 May 2018	Sunday 7:00 pm	1.077	4	
12	"The Knockout Rounds"	7 May 2018	Monday 7:30 pm	1.023	4	
13	"The Knockout Rounds"	8 May 2018	Tuesday 7:30 pm	0.890	6	
14	"The Battle Rounds"	13 May 2018	Sunday 7:00 pm	1.051	2	
15	"The Battle Rounds"	14 May 2018	Monday 7:30 pm	0.928	5	
16	"The Live Shows"	20 May 2018	Sunday 7:00 pm	0.925	3	
17	"The Live Shows"	27 May 2018	Sunday 7:00 pm	0.937	4	
18	"The Live Shows"	3 June 2018	Sunday 7:00 pm	0.859	5	
19	"The Semi-Finals"	10 June 2018	Sunday 7:00 pm	0.810	4	
20	"The Grand Finale"	17 June 2018	Sunday 7:00 pm	1.028	4	
20	"Winner Announced"	17 June 2018	Sunday 7:00 pm	1.086	3	
