= Paper Planes (Hoseah Partsch song) =

Single by Hoseah Partsch
- Released: 2 July 2017
- Recorded: 2017
- Genre: Pop
- Length: 3:44
- Label: Universal Music Australia
- Songwriter(s): Dennis Dowlut, Maxwell Bidstrup

Hoseah Partsch singles chronology
"Paper Planes" (2017)	"Mama" (2017)

"Paper Planes" is the debut single by season six runner-up of The Voice Australia, Hoseah Partsch. It is co-written by Dennis Dowlut (ex-Disco Montego) and Maxwell Bidstrup, which was released digitally immediately after the final on 2 July 2017. The song debuted and peaked at number 35 on the ARIA Singles Chart with 5,147 sales.

Speaking about the single, Partsch said: "I fell in love with it straightaway... It feels like something that I would have written myself. It talks about my life and things that I'm going through today. I've been blessed, and I feel like I'm flying. I'm extremely excited about everything that’s coming up. I can't wait."

A lyric music video was released on YouTube on 7 December 2017.

On the 8 February 2018, Partsch performed the song live on BBC Radio 2 breakfast show.

== Versions ==
- Original – 3:44
- MOZA remix – 3:18
- Hounded remix – 3:14
- Haides remix – 4:21
- Cuurely remix – 3:43

== Charts ==
Chart (2017–18)	Peak position
Australia (ARIA)	35
Scotland (OCC)	36

== Release history ==
Country	Date	Format	Version	Label	Ref.
Australia	2 July 2017	Digital download; streaming	original	Universal Music Australia	
United Kingdom	9 July 2017	Digital download; streaming	original	Universal Music Australia	
Australia	1 December 2017	Digital download; streaming	MOZA remix	Universal Music Australia	
Australia	12 January 2018	Digital download; streaming	Hounded remix	Universal Music Australia	
Australia	19 January 2018	Digital download; streaming	Haides remix	Universal Music Australia	
United Kingdom	20 January 2018	Contemporary hit radio	original	Universal Music Australia	
Australia	26 January 2018	Digital download, streaming	Cuurley remix	Universal Music Australia	
