= The Voice (Australian TV series) season 6 =

The Voice
- Season 6
- Promotional poster featuring coaches Goodrem, Boy George, Rowland, and Seal
- Hosted by: Sonia Kruger
- Coaches: Seal; Delta Goodrem; Kelly Rowland; Boy George
- Winner: Judah Kelly
- Winning coach: Delta Goodrem
- Runner-up: Hoseah Partsch

Release
- Original network: Nine Network
- Original release: 24 April – 2 July 2017

Season chronology
- ← Previous; Season 5 Next → Season 7

The sixth season of The Voice began on 24 April 2017. Delta Goodrem was the only coach to reprise her role from the fifth season. She was joined by returning coach, Seal, returning for his third season after a three-year absence and new additions Boy George and Kelly Rowland, replacing Jessie J, The Madden Brothers and Ronan Keating, respectively.

Judah Kelly from Team Delta won the competition on 2 July 2017, marking Goodrem's third (her first win occurred on The Voice Kids) and final win as a coach.

== Coaches and hosts ==
Coaches and Host of The Voice Season 6

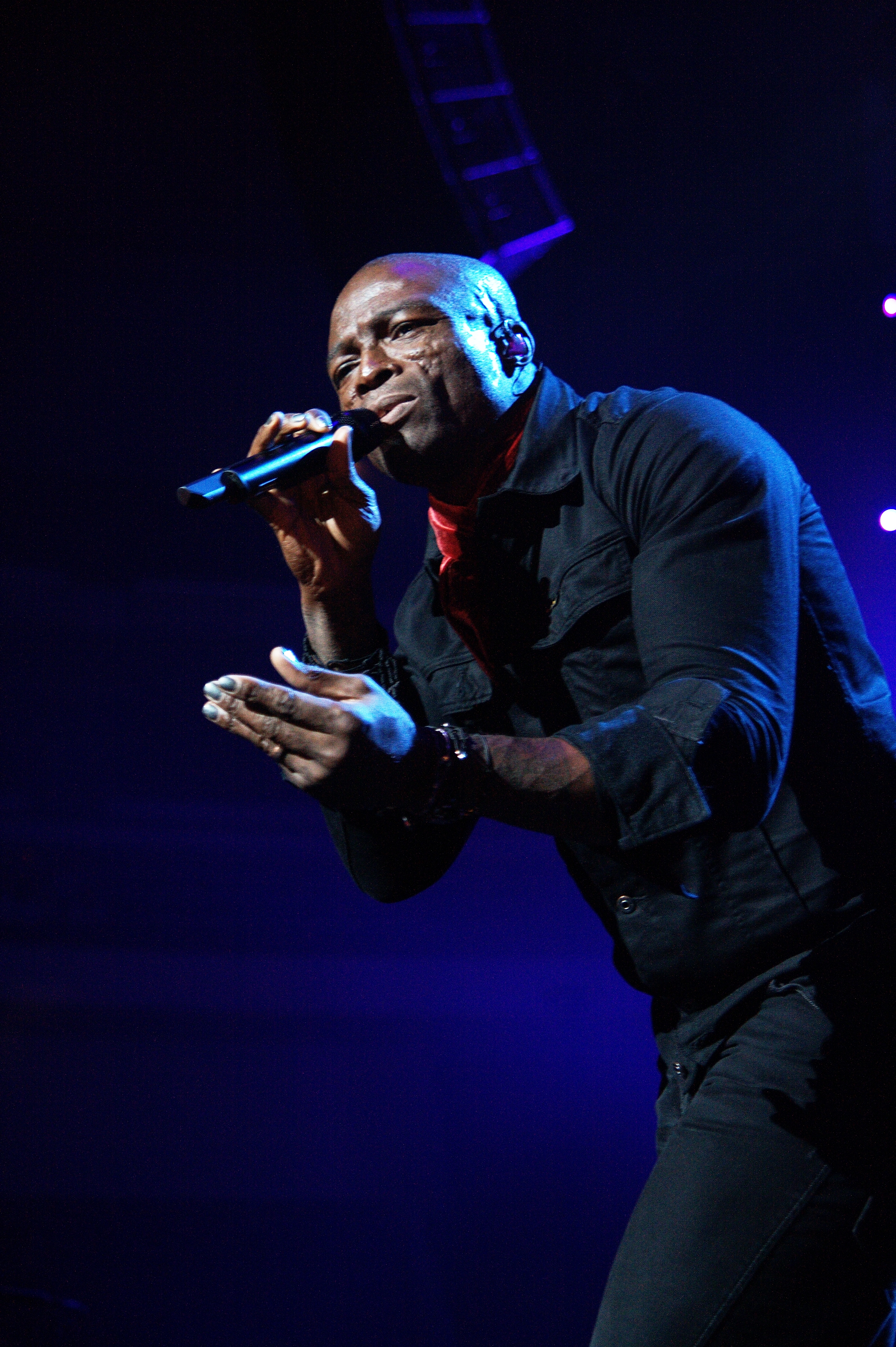
Seal

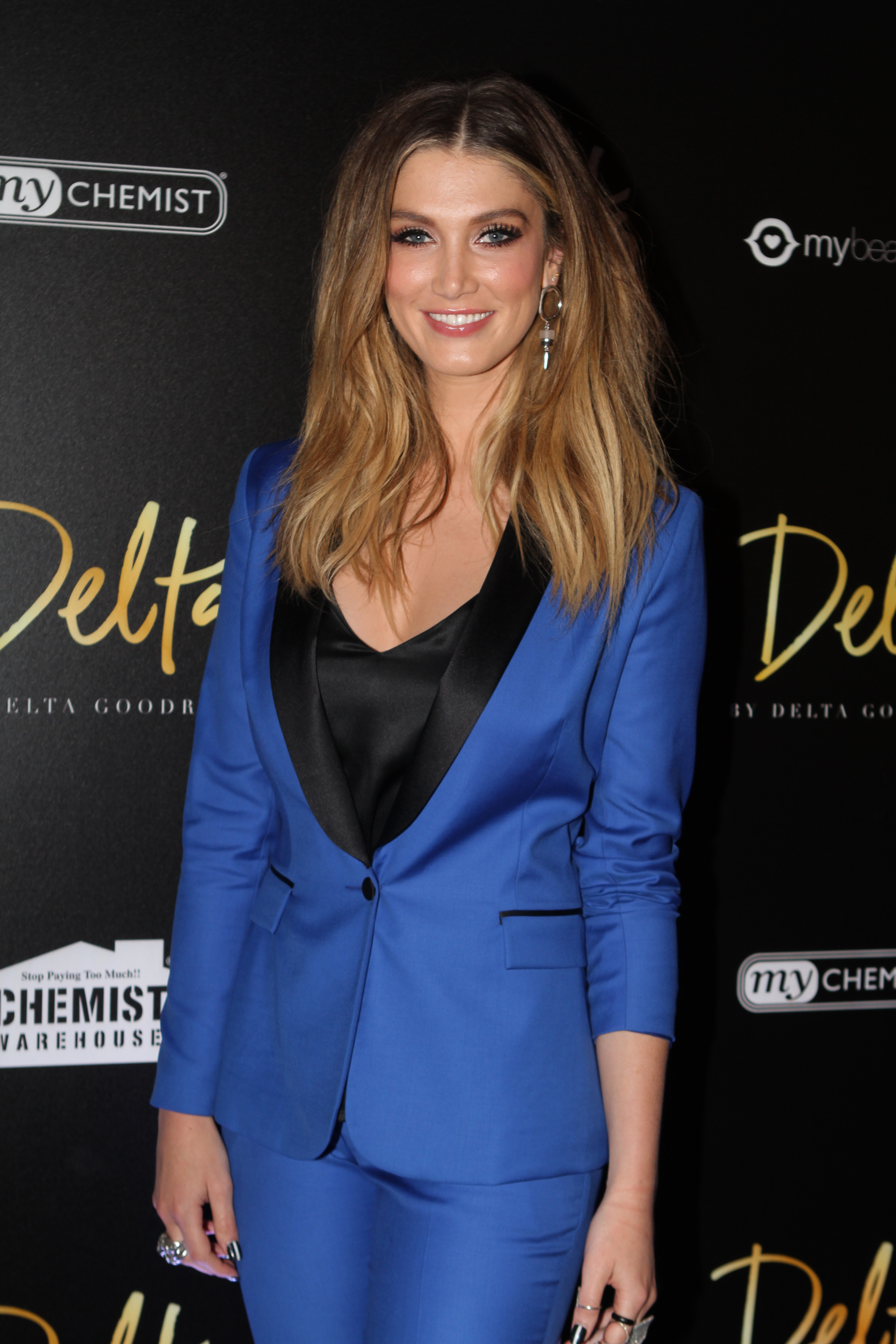
Delta Goodrem

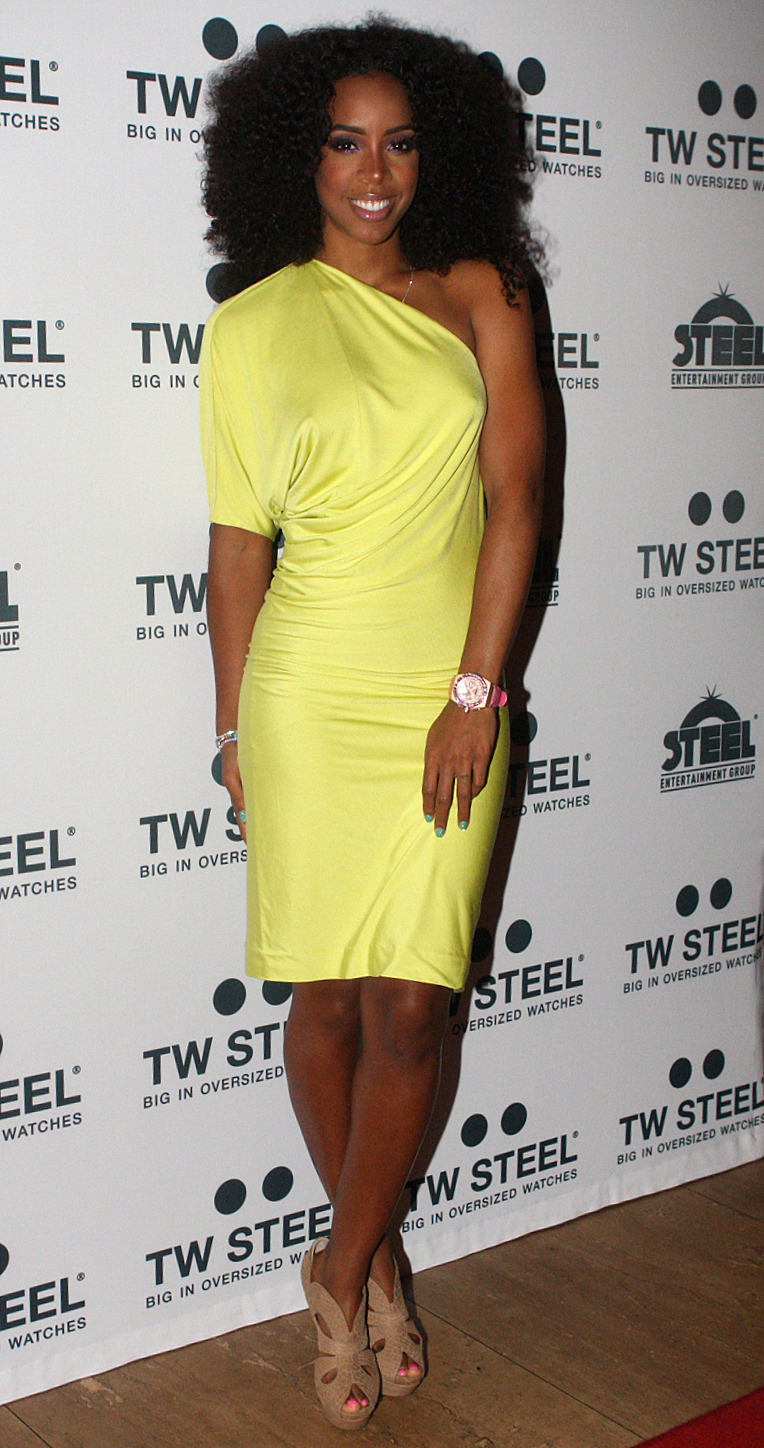
Kelly Rowland

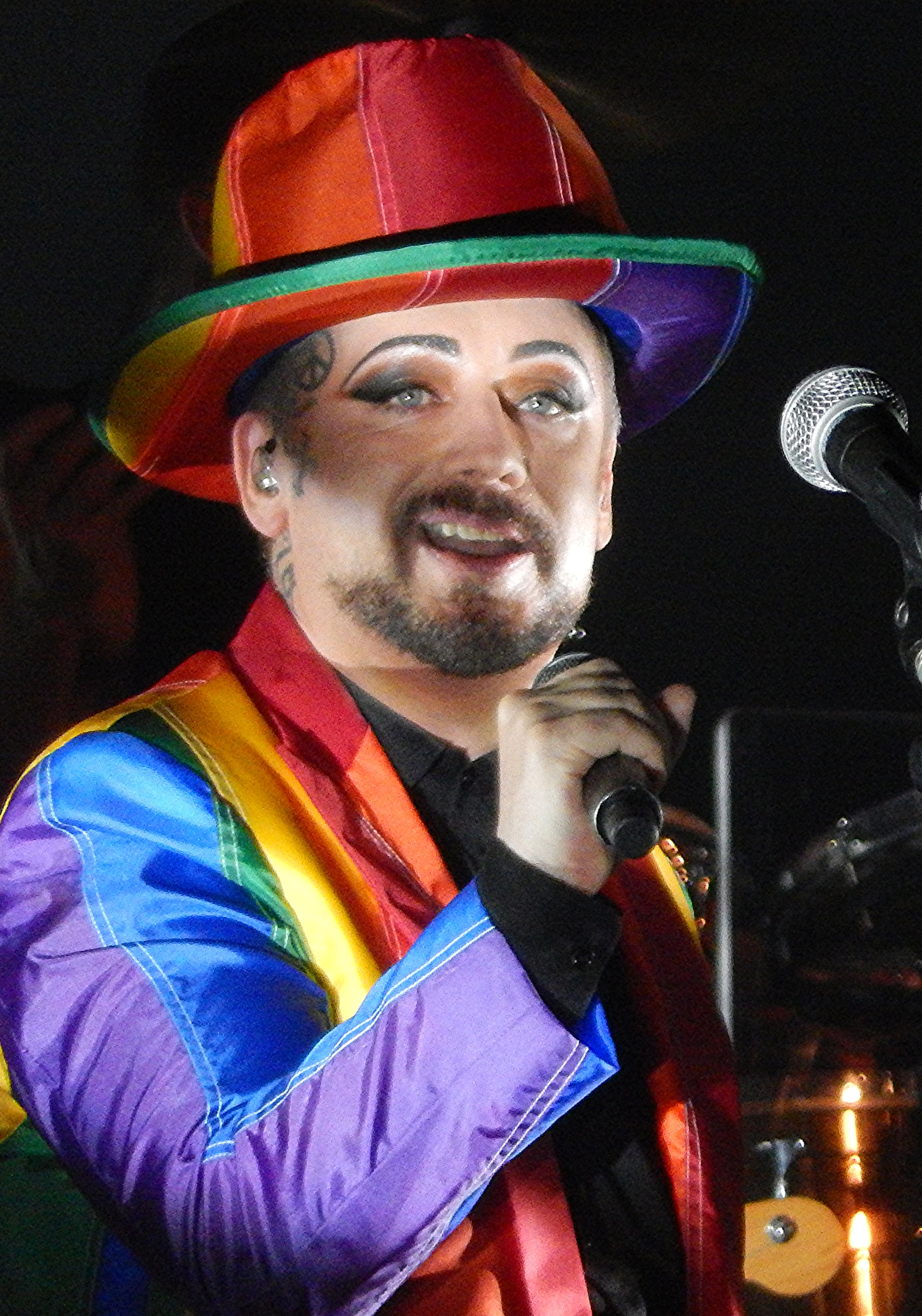
Boy George

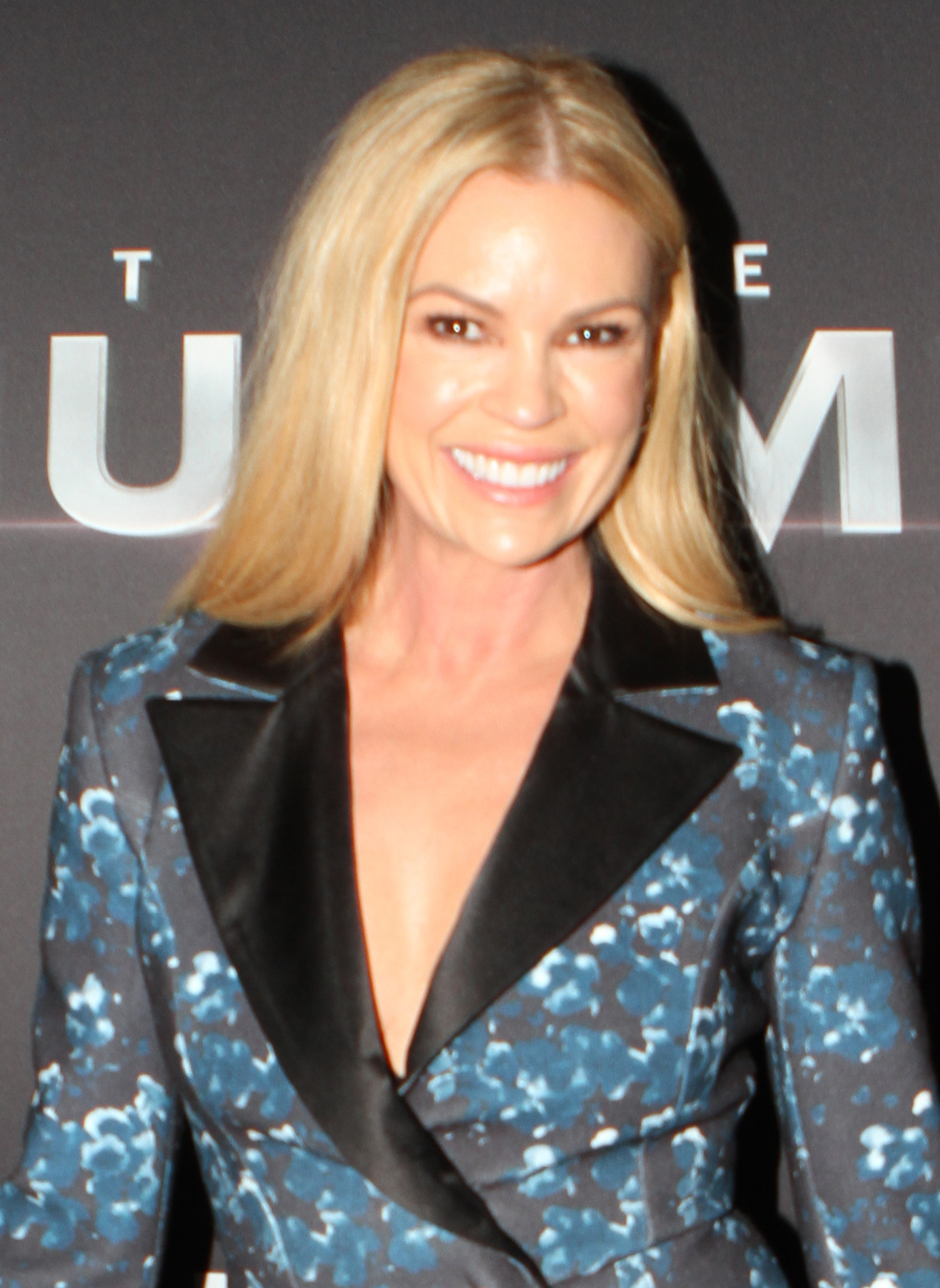
Sonia Kruger

In July 2016, Jessie J announced her departure from The Voice after two seasons, commenting "I've loved doing the show, I've done four seasons: two in the U.K., two in Sydney, but I just need to make another album." In November, it was confirmed that Delta Goodrem would be returning for her fifth season as coach, whilst Seal would be returning for his third season after a three-year hiatus to replace Jessie J. On 8 December 2016, it was announced that former The Voice UK coach Boy George would be joining the show as the third coach replacing The Madden Brothers. On 24 December 2016, via the show's Facebook page, it was announced that former The X Factor USA judge Kelly Rowland would be joining the panel as the fourth and final coach to replace Ronan Keating.

== Teams ==
Color key

- Winner
- Runner-up
- Third place
- Fourth place
- Eliminated in the Live shows
- Eliminated in the Battle rounds
- Artist was stolen in the Knockout rounds
- Eliminated in the Knockout rounds

Coach	Top 48				
Seal					
Seal	Lucy Sugerman	Berni Harrison	Rennie Adams	Annalisse Walker	Ruva Ngwenya
Seal	Camryn Jordans	~~Russel Francis~~	Sam Hale	Ruby Jo	Lara Nakhle
Seal	Jessie Tolo-Paepae	Arthur Bristowe	Liz Conde	Brooke Schubert	
Delta Goodrem					
Delta Goodrem	Judah Kelly	Claire Howell	Tim Conlon	Kelsie Rimmer	James Banks
Delta Goodrem	Ellis Hall	~~Nathan Kneen~~	~~Fasika Ayallew~~	Anthony Sharpe	Sean & Molly
Delta Goodrem	Joel & Leroy	Grace Laing	Rachel Noakes	Kelly Read	
Kelly Rowland					
Kelly Rowland	Fasika Ayallew	Spencer Jones	Bojesse Pigram	Gemma Lyon	Sally Skelton
Kelly Rowland	Russ Walker	~~Camryn Jordans~~	~~Ruva Ngwenya~~	Michelle Mutyora	Tommy Harris
Kelly Rowland	Jasmin Khan	Chloe Kandetzki	Lewis Ciavarella	He Planned Us	
Boy George					
Boy George	Hoseah Partsch	Sarah Stone	Robin Johnson	Nathan Kneen	Russel Francis
Boy George	Lyn Bowtell	~~James Banks~~	~~Ellis Hall~~	~~Sally Skelton~~	Benjamin James Caldwell
Boy George	Taylah Harrington	Brittania Clifford-Pugh	Darcy Thornton	Jesse Dutlow	
Note: Italicized names are stolen artists (names struck through within former teams).

== Blind auditions ==
Color key

✔	Coach hit the "I WANT YOU" button
	Artist defaulted to this team
	Artist elected to join this team
	Artist eliminated with no coach pressing "I WANT YOU" button
	Artist received an 'All Turn'.

=== Episode 1 (24 April) ===
The coaches performed a cover of "Vertigo" together at the start of the show.

Order	Artist	Age	Song	Coaches and artists choices			
Order	Artist	Age	Song	Seal	Delta	Kelly	George
1	Berni Harrison	24	"Dancing in the Dark"	✔	✔	✔	—
2	Robin Johnson	31	"You're Nobody 'til Somebody Loves You"	✔	✔	✔	✔
3	Bojesse Pigram	20	"You Need Me, I Don't Need You"	—	✔	✔	—
4	Natalia Eggett	31	"River Deep – Mountain High"	—	—	—	—
5	Lauren Cassidy	N/A	"Life Is a Highway"	—	—	—	—
6	Danny Alcorn	N\A	"How to Save a Life"	-	-	-	-
7	Emma Paige Fitzgerald	N/A	"Piece by Piece"	—	—	—	—
8	Gemma Lyon	27	"Say My Name"	✔	✔	✔	✔
9	Hoseah Partsch	17	"Almost Is Never Enough"	✔	✔	✔	✔

=== Episode 2 (25 April) ===
Order	Artist	Age	Song	Coaches and artists choices			
Order	Artist	Age	Song	Seal	Delta	Kelly	George
1	Michelle Mutyora	19	"Listen"	—	✔	✔	✔
2	Benjamin James Caldwell	30	"Don't Think Twice, It's All Right"	✔	✔	✔	✔
3	Cherich Rafael	30	"Can't Stop the Feeling!"	—	—	—	—
4	Tim Conlon	23	"Castle on the Hill"	✔	✔	—	—
5	Camryn Jordans	17	"Chandelier"	✔	✔	✔	—
6	Jeff Gibson	48	"Dumb Things"	—	—	—	—
7	Claire Howell	19	"Crazy"	✔	✔	✔	✔

=== Episode 3 (26 April) ===
Order	Artist	Age	Song	Coaches and artists choices			
Order	Artist	Age	Song	Seal	Delta	Kelly	George
1	Sally Skelton	18	"One Day I'll Fly Away"	—	—	✔	✔
2	Andy Walton	33	"I Believe in a Thing Called Love"	—	—	—	—
3	Fasika Ayallew	19	"I Say a Little Prayer"	—	✔	—	✔
4	Arthur Bristowe	32	"Living for the City"	✔	✔	—	—
5	Brittania Clifford-Pugh	17	"Safe & Sound"	—	—	—	✔
6	Tia Gigliotti	20	"Finally"	—	—	—	—
7	Annalisse Walker	30	"I Can't Make You Love Me"	✔	✔	✔	✔

=== Episode 4 (30 April) ===
Order	Artist	Age	Song	Coaches and artists choices			
Order	Artist	Age	Song	Seal	Delta	Kelly	George
1	Brooke Schubert	30	"Taking Chances"	✔	✔	—	—
2	Sean & Molly	23 & 20	"Papercuts"	—	✔	—	—
3	Sam Hale	22	"Lullaby"	✔	—	—	✔
4	Elizabeth Issa	25	"Don't Be So Hard on Yourself"	—	—	—	—
5	Tommy Harris	18	"Fire and the Flood"	—	—	✔	✔
6	Loren Ryan	23	"Bootylicious"	—	—	—	—
7	Lucy Sugerman	15	"Space Oddity"	✔	—	✔	✔

=== Episode 5 (1 May) ===
Order	Artist	Age	Song	Coaches and artists choices			
Order	Artist	Age	Song	Seal	Delta	Kelly	George
1	Jasmin Khan	18	"Royals"	—	—	✔	✔
2	Heath Milner	17	"Much Too Young (To Feel This Damn Old)"	—	—	—	—
3	Russel Francis	30	"Locked Out of Heaven"	✔	—	—	—
4	Joel & Leroy	20 & 20	"Work from Home"	✔	✔	✔	✔
5	Kelly Read	36	"Landslide"	—	✔	—	✔
6	Chelsea J Gibson	39	"Mercy"	—	—	—	—
7	Amy Fredes	N/A	"Whenever, Wherever"	—	—	—	—
8	David Garnham	N/A	"Wish You Well"	—	—	—	—
9	Judah Kelly	20	"Tennessee Whiskey"	✔	✔	✔	✔

=== Episode 6 (2 May) ===
Order	Artist	Age	Song	Coaches and artists choices			
Order	Artist	Age	Song	Seal	Delta	Kelly	George
1	Spencer Jones	47	"Black Dog"	✔	✔	✔	—
2	Grace Laing	16	"Should've Been Us"	✔	✔	—	—
3	Simon Brook McLachlan	N/A	"Your Song"	—	—	—	—
4	Kat Risteska	N/A	"Rain on Your Parade"	—	—	—	—
5	Bree Philipson	N/A	"A Thousand Years"	—	—	—	—
6	Dale Ostridge	24	"Don't You Worry Child"	—	—	—	—
7	Sarah Stone	23	"Autumn"	✔	✔	✔	✔
8	Yasmina Despot	34	"Whatta Man"	—	—	—	—
9	Anthony Sharpe	42	"Mr. Brightside"	—	✔	—	—
10	Nathan Kneen	40	"Nessun dorma"	✔	✔	✔	✔

=== Episode 7 (7 May) ===
Order	Artist	Age	Song	Coaches and artists choices			
Order	Artist	Age	Song	Seal	Delta	Kelly	George
1	Ruby Jo	15	"Scars to Your Beautiful"	✔	—	—	✔
2	Lyn Bowtell	39	"Fields of Gold"	✔	✔	✔	✔
3	Lewis Ciavarella	18	"Billie Jean"	—	—	✔	—
4	Taylor Pfeiffer	17	"He Taught Me To Yodel"	—	—	—	—
5	Jesse Dutlow	20	"Tonight Again"	—	—	—	✔
6	Rianna Corcoran	17	"Mad World"	—	—	—	—
7	Rennie Adams	31	"Tiny Dancer"	✔	✔	✔	✔

=== Episode 8 (8 May) ===
Order	Artist	Age	Song	Coaches and artists choices			
Order	Artist	Age	Song	Seal	Delta	Kelly	George
1	Chloe Kandetzki	15	"Who's Lovin' You"	✔	—	✔	—
2	Russ Walker	31	"If I Ain't Got You"	✔	✔	✔	—
3	Jazmin Varlet	N/A	"Leave (Get Out)"	—	—	—	—
4	Elissa Pietrasanta	N/A	"Heaven"	—	—	—	—
5	Liam Endersby	19	"Dancing on My Own"	—	—	—	—
6	Rachel Noakes	23	"Dear Life"	—	✔	✔	—
7	Jessica D'Souza	20	"Lady Marmalade"	—	—	—	—
8	James Banks	25	"Summertime Sadness"	—	—	—	✔

=== Episode 9 (14 May) ===
Order	Artist	Age	Song	Coaches and artists choices			
Order	Artist	Age	Song	Seal	Delta	Kelly	George
1	Lara Nakhle	19	"Feels Like Home"	✔	—	✔	—
2	He Planned Us	23/20/21	"Joyful, Joyful"	—	✔	✔	—
3	Aydan Calafiore	16	"Say You Won't Let Go"	—	—	—	—
4	Thomas Stowers	38	"Master Blaster (Jammin')"	—	—	—	—
5	Ellis Hall	19	"Free Fallin'"	—	—	—	✔
6	Mercy & Mia	N/A	"You Are My Sunshine"	—	—	—	—
7	Joe Tannoes	N/A	"Closer"	—	—	—	—
8	Tegan Martonyi	N/A	"Wide Awake"	—	—	—	—
9	Liz Conde	20	"I Will Always Love You"	✔	—	—	—
10	Kelsie Rimmer	25	"Monday"	✔	✔	✔	—

=== Episode 10 (15 May) ===
Order	Artist	Age	Song	Coaches and artists choices			
Order	Artist	Age	Song	Seal	Delta	Kelly	George
1	Taylah Harrington	17	"Believe"	—	Team full	✔	✔
2	Jesse Tolo-Paepae	33	"I Got a Woman"	✔	Team full	—	✔
3	Bridget O'Shannessy	17	"Dancing Queen"	Team full	Team full	—	—
4	Darcy Thornton	16	"Part of Me"	Team full	Team full	—	✔
5	Sun Park	N/A	"Listen to Your Heart"	Team full	Team full	—	Team full
6	Tiffany Smith	N/A	"The Climb"	Team full	Team full	—	Team full
7	Roy Sagigi	N/A	"Stand by Me"	Team full	Team full	—	Team full
8	Sharin Attamimi	19	"Feeling Good"	Team full	Team full	—	Team full
9	Ruva Ngwenya	24	"Hello"	Team full	Team full	✔	Team full

== The Knockouts ==
The first episode of the knockouts aired on 21 May 2017. Each knockout round pits 3 artists from the same team against each other, with only one act winning each round. The judges also get two 'steals' each for the entirety of the knockouts, which allows them to steal a rejected act from another team.

Color key

– Contestant wins knockout round
– Contestant loses knockout round but gets saved/advances
– Contestant loses knockout round and is eliminated

=== Episode 11 (21 May) ===
Order	Coach	Theme	Winner		Losers		'Steal' result			
Order	Coach	Theme	Artist	Song	Artists	Song	Seal	Delta	Kelly	George
1	Delta	Adele	Judah Kelly	"When We Were Young"	Fasika Ayallew	"Send My Love (To Your New Lover)"	—	—N/a	✔	—
1	Delta	Adele	Judah Kelly	"When We Were Young"	Kelly Read	"Someone like You"	—	—N/a	—	—
2	George	Dance Producers	Sarah Stone	"Runnin' (Lose It All)"	Darcy Thornton	"Rather Be"	—	—	—	—N/a
2	George	Dance Producers	Sarah Stone	"Runnin' (Lose It All)"	Jesse Dutlow	"Latch"	—	—	—	—N/a
3	Kelly	Independent Woman	Gemma Lyon	"Ain't Nobody"	Lewis Ciavarella	"I Can't Stand the Rain"	—	—	—N/a	—
3	Kelly	Independent Woman	Gemma Lyon	"Ain't Nobody"	He Planned Us	"Ain't No Mountain High Enough"	—	—	—N/a	—
4	Seal	Sia	Lucy Sugerman	"She Wolf (Falling to Pieces)"	Liz Conde	"Alive"	—N/a	—	—	—
4	Seal	Sia	Lucy Sugerman	"She Wolf (Falling to Pieces)"	Brooke Schubert	"Big Girls Cry"	—N/a	—	—	—
5	George	Meaningful Songs to George	Robin Johnson	"Faith"	Sally Skelton	"Will You Love Me Tomorrow"	✔	—	✔	—N/a
5	George	Meaningful Songs to George	Robin Johnson	"Faith"	Ellis Hall	"Need You Tonight"	—	✔	—	—N/a

=== Episode 12 (22 May) ===
Order	Coach	Theme	Winner		Losers		'Steal' result			
Order	Coach	Theme	Artist	Song	Artists	Song	Seal	Delta	Kelly	George
1	Kelly	Ariana Grande	Bojesse Pigram	"One Last Time"	Ruva Ngwenya	"Dangerous Woman"	✔	—	Team full	—
1	Kelly	Ariana Grande	Bojesse Pigram	"One Last Time"	Chloe Kandetzki	"Break Free"	—	—	Team full	—
2	Delta	Justin Bieber	Claire Howell	"Let Me Love You"	Rachel Noakes	"Love Yourself"	—	—N/a	Team full	—
2	Delta	Justin Bieber	Claire Howell	"Let Me Love You"	Grace Laing	"Cold Water"	—	—N/a	Team full	—
3	Seal	Soul Men	Rennie Adams	"When a Man Loves a Woman"	Arthur Bristowe	"Ordinary People"	—N/a	—	Team full	—
3	Seal	Soul Men	Rennie Adams	"When a Man Loves a Woman"	Jessie Tolo-Paepae	"Land of a Thousand Dances"	—N/a	—	Team full	—
4	Delta	ARIA No. 1s	Tim Conlon	"Start Again"	Joel & Leroy	"Never Be like You"	—	—N/a	Team full	—
4	Delta	ARIA No. 1s	Tim Conlon	"Start Again"	Sean & Molly	"Battle Scars"	—	—N/a	Team full	—
5	Kelly	Movie Soundtracks	Spencer Jones	"I Don't Want to Miss a Thing"	Camryn Jordans	"How Far I'll Go"	✔	—	Team full	—
5	Kelly	Movie Soundtracks	Spencer Jones	"I Don't Want to Miss a Thing"	Jasmin Khan	"I Don't Wanna Live Forever"	—	—	Team full	—
6	George	Songs with a Message	Hoseah Partsch	"Man in the Mirror"	James Banks	"Beautiful"	Team full	✔	Team full	—N/a
6	George	Songs with a Message	Hoseah Partsch	"Man in the Mirror"	Brittania Clifford-Pugh	"Imagine"	Team full	—	Team full	—N/a

=== Episode 13 (23 May) ===
Order	Coach	Theme	Winner		Losers		'Steal' result			
Order	Coach	Theme	Artist	Song	Artists	Song	Seal	Delta	Kelly	George
1	Seal	British Singers	Annalisse Walker	"Clown"	Russel Francis	"Shape of You"	Team full	Team full	Team full	✔
1	Seal	British Singers	Annalisse Walker	"Clown"	Lara Nakhle	"People Help the People"	Team full	Team full	Team full	—
2	George	The Beatles	Lyn Bowtell	"Let It Be"	Taylah Harrington	"Here Comes the Sun"	Team full	Team full	Team full	—N/a
2	George	The Beatles	Lyn Bowtell	"Let It Be"	Benjamin James Caldwell	"Jealous Guy"	Team full	Team full	Team full	—N/a
3	Kelly	Beyoncé	Russ Walker	"1+1"	Tommy Harris	"Drunk in Love"	Team full	Team full	Team full	—
3	Kelly	Beyoncé	Russ Walker	"1+1"	Michelle Mutyora	"Halo"	Team full	Team full	Team full	—
4	Delta	Australian Anthems	Kelsie Rimmer	"The Day You Went Away"	Nathan Kneen	"Burn For You"	Team full	Team full	Team full	✔
4	Delta	Australian Anthems	Kelsie Rimmer	"The Day You Went Away"	Anthony Sharpe	"Sweet Disposition"	Team full	Team full	Team full	—
5	Seal	Rihanna	Berni Harrison	"Love on the Brain"	Ruby Jo	"This Is What You Came For"	Team full	Team full	Team full	Team full
5	Seal	Rihanna	Berni Harrison	"Love on the Brain"	Sam Hale	"FourFiveSeconds"	Team full	Team full	Team full	Team full

== Battle rounds ==
The first episode of the Battle Rounds was first broadcast on 28 May 2017.

Color key

– Contestant wins battle round and advances
– Contestant loses battle round and is eliminated

=== Episode 14 (28 May) ===
The coaches performed a cover of "Dream On" together at the start of the show.

Order	Coach	Winner	Battle Song	Loser
1	Seal	Lucy Sugerman	"Issues"	Camryn Jordans
2	George	Sarah Stone	"Why"	Lyn Bowtell
3	Delta	Tim Conlon	"Bloodstream"	Ellis Hall
4	Kelly	Spencer Jones	"Higher Ground"	Russ Walker
5	Delta	Claire Howell	"Rise"	James Banks
6	Kelly	Bojesse Pigram	"Dancing on My Own"	Sally Skelton

=== Episode 15 (29 May) ===
Order	Coach	Winner	Battle Song	Loser
1	Delta	Judah Kelly	"The Climb"	Kelsie Rimmer
2	Seal	Rennie Adams	"Human"	Ruva Ngwenya
3	George	Robin Johnson	"7 Years"	Russel Francis
4	Kelly	Fasika Ayallew	"Remember Me"	Gemma Lyon
5	Seal	Berni Harrison	"California Dreamin'"	Annalisse Walker
6	George	Hoseah Partsch	"Bridge over Troubled Water"	Nathan Kneen

== The Live Shows ==
=== Episode 16 (4 June) ===
The first episode of the Live shows was first broadcast on 4 June 2017.

Order	Coach	Contestant	Song	Result
Top 12 performances
1	Seal	Lucy Sugerman	"Wrecking Ball"	Saved by public
2	Kelly	Bojesse Pigram	"There's Nothing Holdin' Me Back"	Saved by public
3	George	Hoseah Partsch	"Sorry Seems to Be the Hardest Word"	Saved by public
4	Delta	Claire Howell	"Into You"	Saved by public
5	Seal	Rennie Adams	"Let It Go"	Saved by public
6	Kelly	Fasika Ayallew	"Young Hearts Run Free"	Saved by public
7	George	Robin Johnson	"Red"	Bottom two
8	Kelly	Spencer Jones	"We Are the Champions"	Saved by public
9	Delta	Tim Conlon	"Sign of the Times"	Bottom two
10	George	Sarah Stone	"Water Under the Bridge"	Saved by public
11	Seal	Berni Harrison	"Diamonds"	Saved by public
12	Delta	Judah Kelly	"Purple Rain"	Saved by public
Sing-off performances
2.1	George	Robin Johnson	"Don't Let Me Down"	Eliminated
2.2	Delta	Tim Conlon	"Treat You Better"	Instant Save

=== Episode 17 (11 June) ===
Australian sister band The Veronicas performed their new single "The Only High".

Order	Coach	Contestant	Song	Result
Top 11 performances
1.1	George	Hoseah Partsch	"Everybody's Free (To Feel Good)"	Saved by public
1.2	Delta	Claire Howell	"Symphony"	Saved by public
1.3	Seal	Rennie Adams	"Way Down We Go"	Saved by public
1.4	Kelly	Bojesse Pigram	"Waves"	Bottom two
1.5	Delta	Judah Kelly	"Chains"	Saved by public
1.6	Seal	Lucy Sugerman	"Candle in the Wind"	Saved by public
1.7	Kelly	Spencer Jones	"Chain of Fools"	Bottom two
1.8	Delta	Tim Conlon	"Hold Back the River"	Saved by public
1.9	Seal	Berni Harrison	"Only Love Can Hurt Like This"	Saved by public
1.10	George	Sarah Stone	"Gravity"	Saved by public
1.11	Kelly	Fasika Ayallew	"Freedom"	Saved by public
Sing-off performances
2.1	Kelly	Bojesse Pigram	"Sing"	Eliminated
2.2	Kelly	Spencer Jones	"Skyfall"	Instant Save

=== Episode 18 (18 June) ===
- Performance from Hailee Steinfeld with her song Most Girls/Starving.
- Performance from Jennifer Hudson with her new single "Remember Me".

Order	Coach	Contestant	Song	Result
Top 10 performances
1.1	Delta	Judah Kelly	"I'm Not the Only One"	Saved by public
1.2	Seal	Lucy Sugerman	"Don't Kill My Vibe"	Saved by public
1.3	Kelly	Spencer Jones	"Working Class Man"	Saved by public
1.4	George	Sarah Stone	"Scared to Be Lonely"	Saved by public
1.5	Seal	Berni Harrison	"Tears Dry on Their Own"	Bottom three
1.6	Delta	Tim Conlon	"Wonderwall"	Bottom three
1.7	Kelly	Fasika Ayallew	"Love the Way You Lie (Part II)"	Saved by public
1.8	Delta	Claire Howell	"Stay"	Bottom three
1.9	Seal	Rennie Adams	"True Colors"	Saved by public
1.10	George	Hoseah Partsch	"I Wish"	Saved by public
Sing-off performances
2.1	Delta	Claire Howell	"Secret Love Song"	Eliminated
2.2	Seal	Berni Harrison	"Never Tear Us Apart"	Instant Save
2.3	Delta	Tim Conlon	"Ex's & Oh's"	Eliminated

== The Semi-Finals ==
The semi-finals will first broadcast on 25 June 2017. At the end of this episode, four artists will advance to the grand final, while the other four will be eliminated.

Guest Performances

- Alfie Arcuri: "If They Only Knew".
- Jessica Mauboy: "Fallin'".

Notes

- Judah Kelly's rendition of "Hallelujah" reached #3 on the Australian iTunes chart.
- With the eliminations of Sarah Stone and Berni Harrison, this is the first time in two seasons that each coach has an artist advance to the Grand Finale.

Order	Coach	Contestant	Song	Result
Top 8 performances
1.1	Kelly	Fasika Ayallew	"One Night Only"	Saved by public
1.2	Seal	Lucy Sugerman	"Skinny Love"	Saved by public
1.3	Seal	Rennie Adams	"Lonely Boy"	Eliminated
1.4	George	Sarah Stone	"Green Light"	Saved by public
1.5	Kelly	Spencer Jones	"One"	Eliminated
1.6	George	Hoseah Partsch	"I Wanna Dance with Somebody (Who Loves Me)"	Saved by public
1.7	Seal	Berni Harrison	"You Don't Own Me"	Saved by public
1.8	Delta	Judah Kelly	"Iris"	Saved by public
Top 6 performances
2.1	George	Hoseah Partsch	"Is This Love"	Saved by public
2.2	Seal	Berni Harrison	"Turning Tables"	Eliminated
2.3	George	Sarah Stone	"If I Were a Boy"	Eliminated
2.4	Seal	Lucy Sugerman	"It's Oh So Quiet"	Saved by public
2.5	Delta	Judah Kelly	"Hallelujah"	Saved by public
2.6	Kelly	Fasika Ayallew	"I Have Nothing"	Saved by public

== Grand Finale ==
The Grand Finale was first broadcast on 2 July 2017.

Notes

- Judah Kelly's single "Count On Me" reached #1 on the Australian iTunes chart.
- Hoseah Partsch's single "Paper Planes" reached #3 on the Australian iTunes chart.

Solo performances
Order	Coach	Contestant	Song	Result
1	George	Hoseah Partsch	"All of Me" by John Legend	Runner-up
6	George	Hoseah Partsch	"Paper Planes" (Original Song)	Runner-up
2	Kelly	Fasika Ayallew	"When Love Takes Over" by Kelly Rowland	Fourth Place
3	Seal	Lucy Sugerman	"You Belong with Me" by Taylor Swift	Third Place
4	Delta	Judah Kelly	"Climb Ev'ry Mountain" from The Sound of Music	Winner
5	Delta	Judah Kelly	"Count On Me" (Original Song)	Winner

Duet performances
Order	Duet performers		Song
Order	Coach	Contestant	Song
1	Seal	Lucy Sugerman	"Lucy in the Sky with Diamonds" by The Beatles
2	Delta	Judah Kelly	"I Was Here" by Beyoncé
3	George	Hoseah Partsch	"What a Wonderful World" by Louis Armstrong
4	Kelly	Fasika Ayallew	"Proud Mary" by Ike & Tina Turner

Group performances
Order	Performer	Song
1	Top 4 with Katy Perry	"Chained to the Rhythm" by Katy Perry

Special guest performances
Order	Performer/s	Song
1	Noah Cyrus	"I'm Stuck"
2	Niall Horan	"Slow Hands"
3	Katy Perry	"Swish Swish"

== Live Shows Elimination Chart ==
=== Overall ===
Artist's info

- Artist from Team Seal
- Artist from Team Delta
- Artist from Team Kelly
- Artist from Team George

Result details

- Winner
- Runner-up
- Third place
- Fourth place
- Artist was saved by Instant Save (via App)
- Artist was saved by the public
- Artist was saved by his/her coach
- Artist was eliminated

Live show results per week
Artist	Week 1	Week 2	Week 3	Semi-Finals		The Live Final	
Artist	Week 1	Week 2	Week 3	Top 8	Top 6	Round 1	Round 2
Judah Kelly	Safe	Safe	Safe	Safe	Safe	Safe	Winner
Hoseah Partsch	Safe	Safe	Safe	Safe	Safe	Safe	Runner-up
Lucy Sugerman	Safe	Safe	Safe	Safe	Safe	3rd Place	Eliminated in the Live Final Round 1
Fasika Ayallew	Safe	Safe	Safe	Safe	Safe	4th Place	Eliminated in the Live Final Round 1
Berni Harrison	Safe	Safe	Safe	Safe	Eliminated	Eliminated in the Semi-Finals	
Sarah Stone	Safe	Safe	Safe	Safe	Eliminated	Eliminated in the Semi-Finals	
Rennie Adams	Safe	Safe	Safe	Eliminated	Eliminated in the Semi-Finals		
Spencer Jones	Safe	Safe	Safe	Eliminated	Eliminated in the Semi-Finals		
Claire Howell	Safe	Safe	Eliminated	Eliminated (Week 3)			
Tim Conlon	Safe	Safe	Eliminated	Eliminated (Week 3)			
Bojesse Pigram	Safe	Eliminated	Eliminated (Week 2)				
Robin Johnson	Eliminated	Eliminated (Week 1)					

=== Team ===
Result details

- Winner
- Runner-up
- 3rd place
- 4th place
- Artist was saved by Instant Save (via App)
- Artist was saved by public
- Artist was eliminated

Live show results per week
Artist	Live Shows					The Live Finale	
Artist	Week 1	Week 2	Week 3	The Semi-Final		The Live Finale	
Artist	Week 1	Week 2	Week 3	Top 8	Top 6	Round 1	Round 2
Lucy Sugerman	Safe	Safe	Safe	Safe	Safe	3rd Place	
Berni Harrison	Safe	Safe	Safe	Safe	Eliminated		
Rennie Adams	Safe	Safe	Safe	Eliminated			
Fasika Ayallew	Safe	Safe	Safe	Safe	Safe	4th Place	
Spencer Jones	Safe	Safe	Safe	Eliminated			
Bojesse Pigram	Safe	Eliminated					
Judah Kelly	Safe	Safe	Safe	Safe	Safe	Safe	Winner
Claire Howell	Safe	Safe	Eliminated				
Tim Conlon	Safe	Safe	Eliminated				
Hoseah Partsch	Safe	Safe	Safe	Safe	Safe	Safe	Runner-up
Sarah Stone	Safe	Safe	Safe	Safe	Eliminated		
Robin Johnson	Eliminated						

== Contestants who appeared on previous shows or seasons ==
- Aydan Calafiore was previously a cast member of the 2012 reboot of Network Ten's Young Talent Time and auditioned on Australia's Got Talent in 2013.
- Grace Laing auditioned for The Voice Kids and made it to the top 6.
- Claire Howell originally auditioned for season 5, where she was eliminated during the battle rounds.
- Kelsie Rimmer originally auditioned for season 1, where she was eliminated during the battle rounds.
- Judah Kelly auditioned for season 4 and season 6 of the Australian The X Factor but didn't make it to the live shows.
- Michelle Mutyora was a member of the 2012 reboot of Network Ten's Young Talent Time.
- Ellis Hall auditioned for season 5 of the Australian The X Factor part of Straight Up but didn't make it to the live shows and auditioned for season 6 but this time made the live shows as a member of Younger Than Yesterday and got eliminated in 12th place.
- Chelsea J Gibson competed on season 1 of Australian Idol and was eliminated in the semi-finals.

== Ratings ==
The Voice season six consolidated viewership and adjusted position Colour key: – Highest rating during the season – Lowest rating during the season
Episode		Original airdate	Timeslot	Viewers (millions)	Night Rank	Source
1	"The Blind Auditions"	24 April 2017	Monday 7:30 pm	1.277	#1	
2	"The Blind Auditions"	25 April 2017	Tuesday 7:30 pm	1.256	#4	
3	"The Blind Auditions"	26 April 2017	Wednesday 7:30 pm	1.159	#2	
4	"The Blind Auditions"	30 April 2017	Sunday 7:00 pm	1.248	#3	
5	"The Blind Auditions"	1 May 2017	Monday 7:30 pm	1.244	#1	
6	"The Blind Auditions"	2 May 2017	Tuesday 7:30 pm	1.191	#1	
7	"The Blind Auditions"	7 May 2017	Sunday 7:00 pm	1.124	#2	
8	"The Blind Auditions"	8 May 2017	Monday 7:30 pm	1.164	#1	
9	"The Blind Auditions"	14 May 2017	Sunday 7:00 pm	1.161	#1	
10	"The Blind Auditions"	15 May 2017	Monday 7:30 pm	1.116	#2	
11	"The Knockout Rounds"	21 May 2017	Sunday 7:00 pm	1.101	#2	
12	"The Knockout Rounds"	22 May 2017	Monday 7:30 pm	1.053	#5	
13	"The Knockout Rounds"	23 May 2017	Tuesday 7:30 pm	0.992	#5	
14	"The Battle Rounds"	28 May 2017	Sunday 7:00 pm	1.108	#4	
15	"The Battle Rounds"	29 May 2017	Monday 7:30 pm	0.997	#7	
16	"The Live Shows"	4 June 2017	Sunday 7:00 pm	1.058	#4	
17	"The Live Shows"	11 June 2017	Sunday 7:00 pm	0.914	#4	
18	"The Live Shows"	18 June 2017	Sunday 7:00 pm	1.005	#4	
19	"The Semi-Final"	25 June 2017	Sunday 7:00 pm	0.987	#4	
20	"The Grand Finale"	2 July 2017	Sunday 7:00 pm	1.231	#4	
20	"The Final Two"	2 July 2017	Sunday 7:00 pm	1.347	#2	
20	"Winner Announced"	2 July 2017	Sunday 7:00 pm	1.357	#1	
