= Judah Kelly =

Australian singer-songwriter

- Born: 15 November 1996 (age 30)
- Origin: Townsville, Queensland, Australia
- Genres: Pop, country soul
- Occupations: Singer, songwriter
- Years active: 2017–present
- Label: Universal Music Australia

Judah Kelly (born 15 November 1996) is an Australian singer-songwriter best known for winning the sixth series of The Voice Australia in 2017. He signed with Universal Music Australia. Kelly described his music as "country with soul".

== Early life ==
In 2006, Kelly attended Queens Beach State School in Bowen, Queensland. While there, he was a part of the school choir.

In 2011, Kelly attended the Junior Academy of Country Music in Tamworth, New South Wales, and has since also made regular appearances at the Tamworth Country Music Festival.

Kelly auditioned for The X Factor Australia in 2012 and 2014, without success.

== Career ==
=== 2017: The Voice ===
In 2017, Kelly took part in the sixth season of The Voice Australia, where he joined Delta Goodrem's team after singing "Tennessee Whiskey" in the blind audition. He made it through to the Grand Finale, held on 2 July, where he was announced as the winner. His winner's single "Count On Me" was released immediately after the announcement. Speaking to Fairfax Media, Kelly said: "I came in not really seeing myself getting very far at all in the competition, to be able to say that I won... it's everything." Kelly stated that "Count On Me" is about battling "dark times". The song debuted at number 19 on the ARIA Charts with 7,980 sales.

denotes winner. denotes a song that reached the top 10 on iTunes.

The Voice performances and results (2017)
Episode	Song	Original Artist	Result
Audition	"Tennessee Whiskey"	Chris Stapleton	Through to The Knockouts
The Knockouts	"When We Were Young"	Adele	Through to Battle Rounds
Battle Rounds	"The Climb"	Miley Cyrus	Through to live shows
Live show 1	"Purple Rain"	Prince	Saved by public
Live show 2	"Chains"	Tina Arena	Saved by public
Live show 3	"I'm Not the Only One"	Sam Smith	Saved by public
Semi Final	"Iris"	Goo Goo Dolls	Saved by public
Semi Final	"Hallelujah"	Leonard Cohen	Saved by public
Grand Final	"Climb Ev'ry Mountain"	The Sound of Music	Winner
Grand Final	"I Was Here" (with Delta Goodrem)	Beyoncé	Winner
Grand Final	"Count On Me"	Kelly	Winner

On 15 December, Kelly released a live version of Leonard Cohen's "Hallelujah".

=== 2018: Real Good Time ===
On 10 August 2018, Kelly released "Real Good Time" the lead single from his second studio album of the same name due on 5 October 2018. Kelly also announced a "Real Good Time" tour commencing in October 2018.

On 5 October 2018, Kelly released "Found" as the second single from Real Good Time.

Kelly featured in the 2025 short film, The Singers which won an Academy Award.

== Discography ==
=== Albums ===
Title	Album details	Peak chart positions
Title	Album details	AUS
Count On Me	Released: 28 July 2017; Label: Universal Music Australia; Formats: Digital download, CD, streaming	3
Real Good Time	Released: 5 October 2018; Label: Universal Music Australia; Formats: Digital download, CD, streaming	— (Note: Real Good Time did not enter the ARIA Albums Chart, but peaked at number 38 on the ARIA Physical Albums Chart.)

=== Singles ===
Title	Year	Peak chart positions	Album
Title	Year	AUS	Album
"Count On Me"	2017	19	Count On Me
"Kingdom Come"	2017	—	Count On Me
"Hallelujah"	2017	—	Non-album single
"Real Good Time"	2018	—	Real Good Time
"Found"	2018	—	Real Good Time
"—" denotes releases that did not chart or were not released.

== Awards and nominations ==
=== Country Music Awards of Australia ===
The Country Music Awards of Australia is an annual awards night held in January during the Tamworth Country Music Festival. Celebrating recording excellence in the Australian country music industry. They commenced in 1973.

Year	Nominee / work	Award	Result	Ref.
2018	Judah Kelly	New Artist of the Year	Nominated	
2019	Judah Kelly	New Artist of the Year	Nominated	

== Notes ==
Preceded by Alfie Arcuri	The Voice winner 2017	Succeeded by Sam Perry
