= The Voice of Germany season 11 =

Season of television series

The Voice of Germany
- Season 11
- Promotional poster featuring coaches Forster, Santos, Connor, and Oerding
- Hosted by: Lena Gercke; Thore Schölermann (blind auditions, battle rounds, sing-offs, quarterfinal); Melissa Khalaj (semi-final); Steven Gätjen (final)
- Coaches: Mark Forster; Nico Santos; Sarah Connor; Johannes Oerding; Elif Demirezer (Comeback stage)
- Winner: Sebastian Krenz
- Winning coach: Johannes Oerding
- Runner-up: Gugu Zulu

Release
- Original network: ProSieben; Sat.1
- Original release: October 7 – December 19, 2021

Season chronology
- ← Previous; Season 10 Next → Season 12

The eleventh season of the talent show The Voice of Germany premiered on October 7, 2021 on ProSieben and on October 10, 2021 on Sat.1. Both singers and songwriters Mark Forster and Nico Santos returned as coaches for their fifth and second seasons, respectively, and two new coaches joined: singers and songwriters Johannes Oerding, and Sarah Connor, who replaced Samu Haber & Rea Garvey, and Stefanie Kloss & Yvonne Catterfeld. Elif Demirezer was the new "Comeback Stage" coach, who selected contestants to participate in The Voice: Comeback Stage by SEAT, replacing Michael Schulte. Thore Schölermann and Lena Gercke returned as hosts for their tenth and seventh seasons, respectively.

Sebastian Krenz was named The Voice of Germany on December 19, 2021, this marked Johannes Oerding’s first and only win as a coach.

== Coaches and hosts ==
Coaches of The Voice of Germany season 11

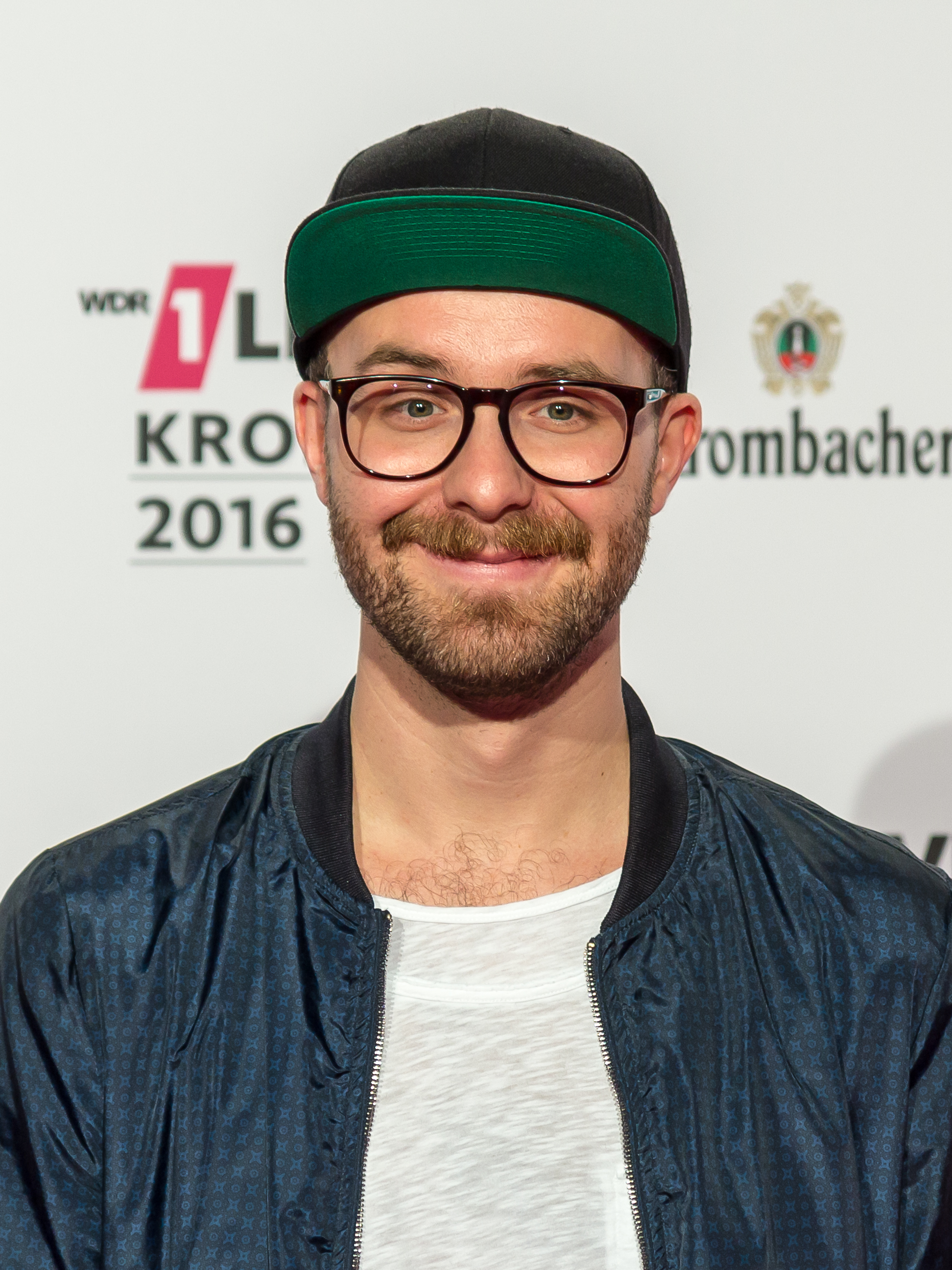
Mark Forster

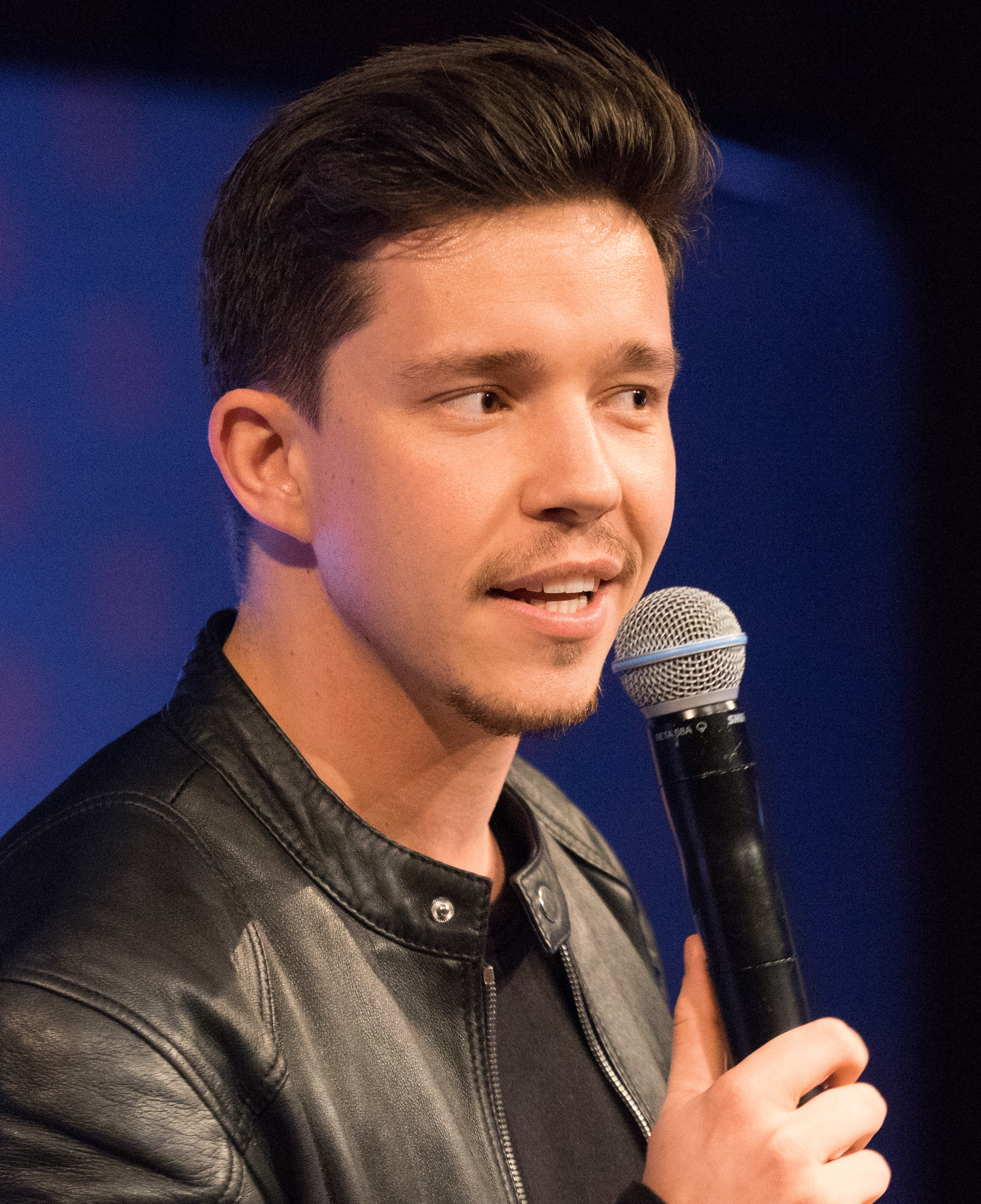
Nico Santos

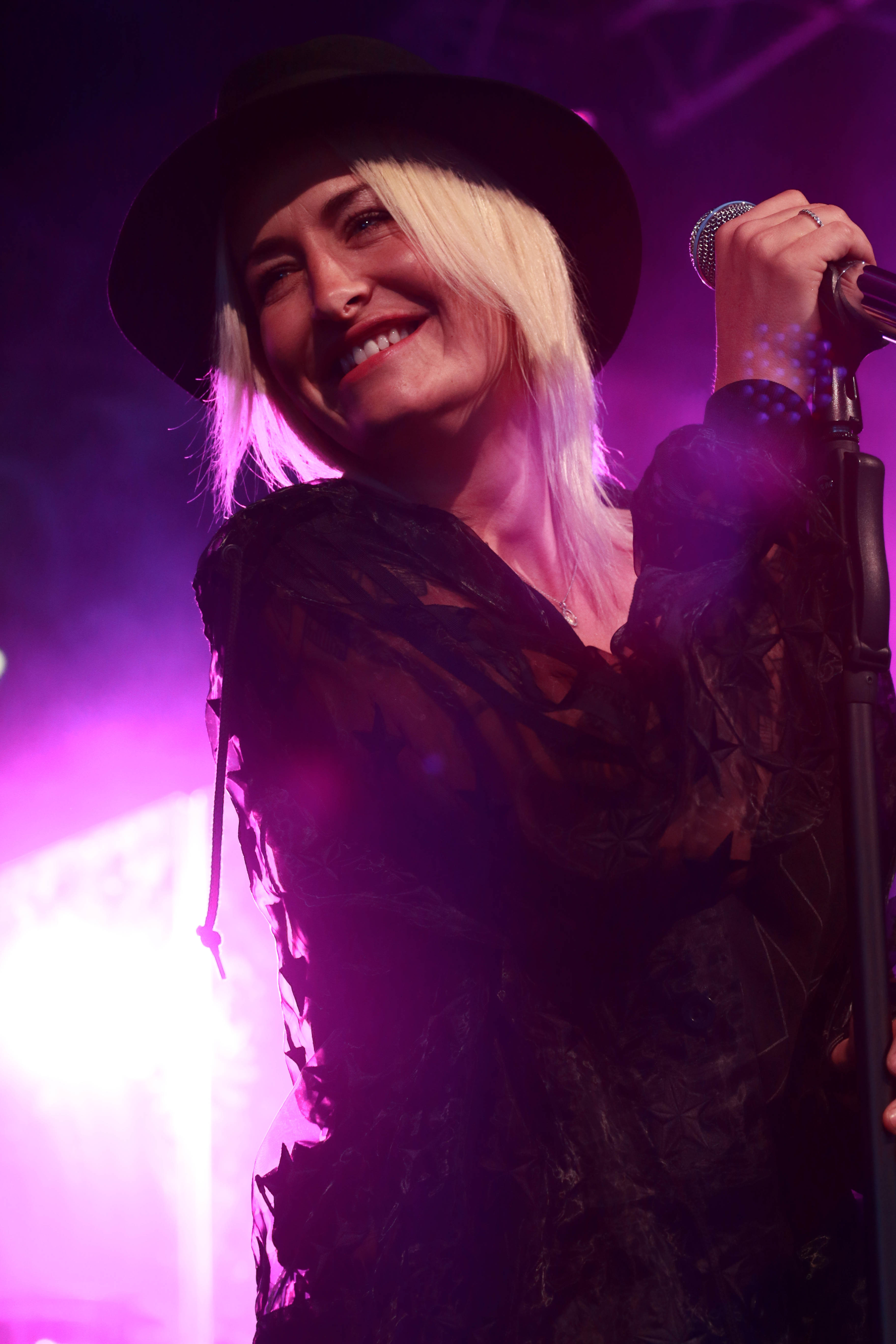
Sarah Connor

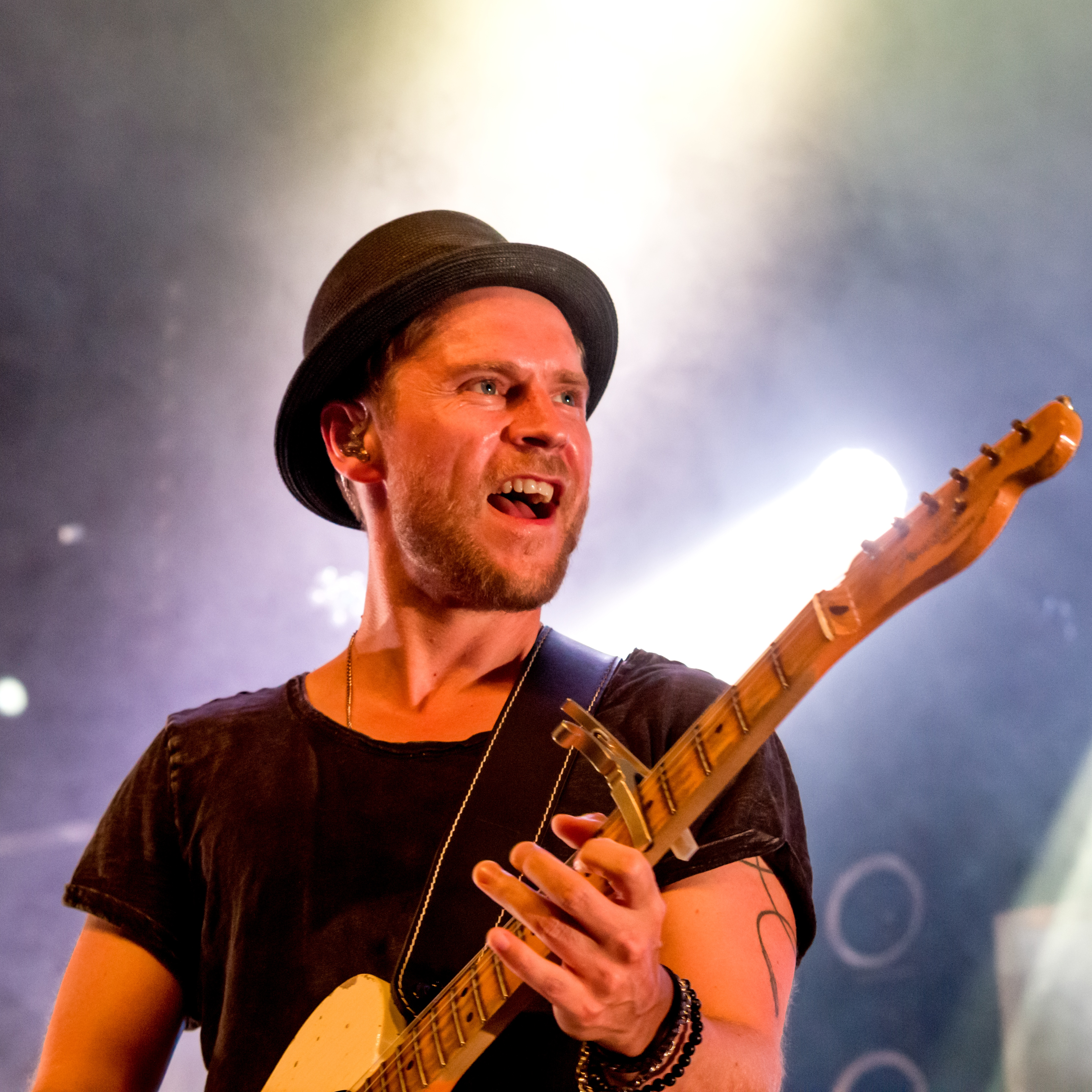
Johannes Oerding

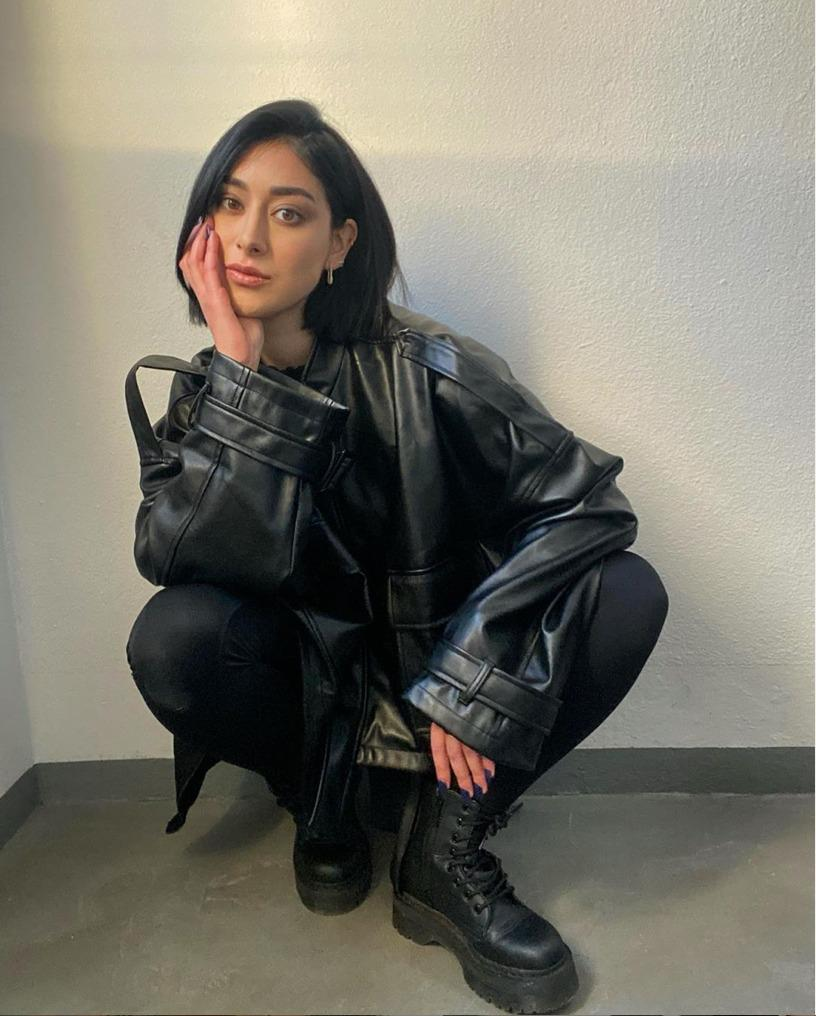
Elif (Comeback Stage)

On 9 June 2021, it was announced that Samu Haber, Rea Garvey, Stefanie Kloss, and Yvonne Catterfeld would not be returning for the eleventh season, and this season would not have a duo coach again. On 15 June 2021, it was rumored that Johannes Oerding and Sarah Connor would be joining the show as new coaches, whereas Mark Forster and Nico Santos would be returning. On 25 June 2021, ProSieben and Sat.1 announced that Forster, Santos, Oerding and Connor would be the coaches for the eleventh season, alongside Elif Demirezer who became this year's fifth coach, mentoring unsuccessful auditioners as well as eliminated artists from later rounds of the competition, on the online version The Voice: Comeback Stage by SEAT.

Thore Schölermann and Lena Gercke both remained on the show as hosts. Schölermann did not take part after the quarterfinal, because he and his wife are expecting the birth of their first child. Melissa Khalaj will moderate in his place in the semifinal and Steven Gätjen in the final.

== Teams ==
Main Competition

- Winner
- Runner-up
- Third place
- Fourth place
- Fifth place
- Eliminated in the Live shows
- Eliminated but selected to participate in Comeback Stage
- Eliminated in the Sing Off
- Stolen in the Battle rounds
- Eliminated in the Battle rounds
- Eliminated in the Pre-Battle
- Withdrew

Comeback Stage

- Eliminated in the finals
- Eliminated in the third rounds
- Eliminated in the second rounds
- Eliminated in the first rounds

Coaching teams
Coaches	Top 83 Artists					
Mark Forster						
Mark Forster	Florian & Charlene	The Razzzones	Luna Farina	Alex Kerski	Stefanie Black	Karen Tepperis
Mark Forster	Chris Gogler	~~JOEMISMO~~	Mia Sternberger	Peter Hoebertz	Mazen Mohsen	Marco Spöri
Mark Forster	Tímea Göghova	Nico Lange	Patrick Rokitensky	Perry Beenen	Jakob Wenig	Babsi Pak
Mark Forster	Jonas Eisemann					
Nico Santos						
Nico Santos	Gugu Zulu	Kati Lamberts	Jennifer Williams	Azarel Gottfried	Sang-Ji Lee	Julia & Barbara
Nico Santos	Robin Becker	~~Will Church~~	~~Roman Pocta~~	Larissa Frank	Natascha Ronowski	Tillmann Urbaniak
Nico Santos	Laura & Sophie	Taiga Trece	Lisa & David (Note: In the group were 3 Persons, Anna, Lisa and David, but Anna had to leave the show, due to personal reasons, and Lisa and David continued in duo.)	Marina Vavoura	Maximilian Theiss	André Stangier
Nico Santos	Milijana Mijatović					
Sarah Connor						
Sarah Connor	Katarina Mihaljević	Archippe Ombang	Joel Zupan	~~JOEMISMO~~	Robert Cotton	Noordin Derbali
Sarah Connor	Anouar Chauech	Anton Verzani	~~Kira Bernard~~	~~Hai Mi Trân~~	~~Luna Farina~~	~~Jennifer Williams~~
Sarah Connor	~~Ann Sophie~~	Oliver Zinhobl	Jennifer Hans	Raya Despodovska	Ilho Cho	Laila Ghaleb
Sarah Connor	Sophie Platiel	Jacqueline Büthe	Ron Jackson	Katy Weber		
Johannes Oerding						
Johannes Oerding	Sebastian Krenz	Ann Sophie	Zeynep Avci	~~Linda Elsener~~	~~Lena Belgart~~	Dirk Weidner
Johannes Oerding	Martin Bollig	Laura Plösser	Alisha Popat	Simon Fetzer	Matthias Wiesner	Anastasia Troska
Johannes Oerding	Nadja Fingerhuth	Patrick Aretz	Naomi Maier	Norman Ebel	Charline Klimt	Max Hofmann
Johannes Oerding	Nico Grund					
Elif Demirezer						
Elif Demirezer	Linda Elsener	Sascha Salvati	Lena Belgart	Mathis Kloss	Will Church	JOEMISMO
Elif Demirezer	Hai Mi Trân	Kira Bernard	Roman Pocta	Ophundem Nyama	Salomé Stresing	Christoph Rieger
Elif Demirezer	Myriam Benoun	Raffi Kerz	Felix Breßmer			
Note: Italicized names are stolen artists (names struck through within former teams). The underlined names are the "Comeback Stage" winners, who advanced to the Live shows.

== Blind auditions ==
The blind auditions were recorded from June 25, 2021 to June 30, 2021 at Studio Adlershof in Berlin and were broadcast from October 7, 2021 until November 7, 2021, being broadcast every Thursday on ProSieben and every Sunday on Sat.1.

Blind auditions color key
✔	Coach hit his/her "I WANT YOU" button
	Artist defaulted to this coach's team
	Artist elected to join this coach's team
	Artist was eliminated, but got a second chance to compete in "Comeback Stage"
	Artist was eliminated and was not invited back for "Comeback Stage"

Blind auditions results
Episode	Order	Artist	Age	Song	Coach's and artist's choices			
Episode	Order	Artist	Age	Song	Mark	Nico	Sarah	Johannes
Episode 1 (October 7)	1	Jennifer Williams	63	"I Put a Spell on You"	✔	✔	✔	✔
Episode 1 (October 7)	2	Nico Grund	27	"Supermarket Flowers"	✔	–	–	✔
Episode 1 (October 7)	3	Dan Perry	27	"Killer Queen"	–	–	–	–
Episode 1 (October 7)	4	Zeynep Avci	38	"Yalan"	✔	✔	✔	✔
Episode 1 (October 7)	5	Janine Gierszewsky	21	"Why So Serious"	–	–	–	–
Episode 1 (October 7)	6	Archippe Ombang	21	"Count On Me"	✔	–	✔	–
Episode 1 (October 7)	7	Andy Woithe	33	"(I Just) Died in Your Arms"	–	–	–	–
Episode 1 (October 7)	8	Laura & Sophie	23/26	"Valerie"	✔	✔	–	✔
Episode 1 (October 7)	9	Peter Hoebertz	31	"Wellerman (Sea Shanty)"	✔	–	–	–
Episode 1 (October 7)	10	Salomé Stresing	23	"Say So"	–	–	–	–
Episode 1 (October 7)	11	Katarina Mihaljević	21	"Drivers License"	✔	✔	✔	✔
Episode 2 (October 10)
Episode 2 (October 10)	1	Jennifer Hans	31	"Juice"	✔	✔	✔	✔
Episode 2 (October 10)	2	Philipp Steffen	39	"Luka"	–	–	–	–
Episode 2 (October 10)	3	Natascha Ronowski	25	"One And Only"	✔	✔	–	–
Episode 2 (October 10)	4	Sebastian Krenz	29	"Still Loving You"	✔	✔	✔	✔
Episode 2 (October 10)	5	Katy Weber	20	"Break My Heart"	–	–	✔	–
Episode 2 (October 10)	6	Fadi Semmo	32	"U Got It Bad"	–	–	–	–
Episode 2 (October 10)	7	Anton Verzani	22	"Grüne Augen Lügen Nicht"	✔	–	✔	✔
Episode 2 (October 10)	8	The Razzzones	33-38	"Drop It Like It's Hot"	✔	✔	✔	✔
Episode 2 (October 10)	9	Jeanette Alterino	31	"Come Together"	–	–	–	–
Episode 2 (October 10)	10	Karen Tepperis	71	"When We Were Young"	✔	–	–	–
Episode 2 (October 10)	11	Felix Breßmer	25	"Will We Talk?"	–	–	–	–
Episode 2 (October 10)	12	Anouar Chauech	26	"Breathe Easy"	✔	✔	✔	✔
Episode 3 (October 14)
Episode 3 (October 14)	1	Francesco Farina	51	"Adesso tu"	–	–	–	–
Episode 3 (October 14)	2	Luna Farina	19	"Wie schön du bist"	✔	✔	✔	✔
Episode 3 (October 14)	3	Chris Gogler	31	"I Wanna Dance With Somebody"	✔	–	–	–
Episode 3 (October 14)	4	Will Church	26	"Arcade"	✔	✔	✔	✔
Episode 3 (October 14)	5	Susanne Seeber	54	"Locked Out of Heaven"	–	–	–	–
Episode 3 (October 14)	6	Julia & Barbara	24/28	"Hypnotized"	✔	✔	–	–
Episode 3 (October 14)	7	Daniel Hellmann	35	"Take On Me"	–	–	–	–
Episode 3 (October 14)	8	Oliver Zinhobl	27	"This Is The Life"	–	–	✔	✔
Episode 3 (October 14)	9	Martin Bollig	27	"Steine"	✔	–	–	✔
Episode 3 (October 14)	10	Raffi Kerz	21	"Break My Heart"	–	–	–	–
Episode 3 (October 14)	11	Ann Sophie	30	"Summertime"	✔	✔	✔	✔
Episode 4 (October 17)
Episode 4 (October 17)	1	Florian & Charlene	35/32	"Mercy"	✔	✔	–	–
Episode 4 (October 17)	2	Azarel Gottfried	24	"Nana Triste"	✔	✔	✔	✔
Episode 4 (October 17)	3	Philipp Allar	28	"Prisoner"	–	–	–	–
Episode 4 (October 17)	4	Stefanie Black	22	"Genau hier"	✔	–	–	✔
Episode 4 (October 17)	5	Florian Schindler	29	"Wasted Love"	–	–	–	–
Episode 4 (October 17)	6	Ilho Cho	44	"Highway Star"	✔	✔	✔	✔
Episode 4 (October 17)	7	Mathis Kloss	16	"Glück Ist Leicht"	–	–	–	–
Episode 4 (October 17)	8	Linda Elsener	20	"I Won't Let You Go"	✔	–	✔	✔
Episode 4 (October 17)	9	Tillmann Urbaniak	20	"Erfolg ist kein Glück"	✔	✔	–	–
Episode 4 (October 17)	10	Petra Berghaus	53	"Mut"	–	–	–	–
Episode 4 (October 17)	11	Gugu Zulu	28	"I Look to You"	✔	✔	✔	✔
Episode 5 (October 21)	1	Taiga Trece	35	"Soy Yo"	–	✔	–	✔
Episode 5 (October 21)	2	Romy Wolf	19	"Almost Is Never Enough"	–	–	–	–
Episode 5 (October 21)	3	Noordin Derbali	42	"Treat You Better"	✔	✔	✔	✔
Episode 5 (October 21)	4	Josua Schwab	20	"Pauken"	–	–	–	–
Episode 5 (October 21)	5	Naomi Maier	24	"Without Me"	✔	–	–	✔
Episode 5 (October 21)	6	Robin Becker	25	"Keiner Ist Wie Du"	✔	✔	✔	✔
Episode 5 (October 21)	7	Myriam Benoun	24	"Sunny"	–	–	–	–
Episode 5 (October 21)	8	Alex Kerski	24	"Psychosocial"	✔	–	–	–
Episode 5 (October 21)	9	Jacqueline Büthe	28	"Tell It To My Heart"	✔	–	✔	✔
Episode 5 (October 21)	10	Norman Ebel	39	"Katy Perry"	–	–	–	✔
Episode 5 (October 21)	11	Hao Phan Quoc	18	"Without You"	–	–	–	–
Episode 5 (October 21)	12	Robert Cotton	69	"Hey Bartender"	✔	✔	✔	✔
Episode 6 (October 24)
Episode 6 (October 24)	1	Justin Sobot	21	"Hold My Girl"	–	–	–	–
Episode 6 (October 24)	2	Kati Lamberts	26	"Bohemian Rhapsody"	✔	✔	✔	✔
Episode 6 (October 24)	3	Mia Sternberger	27	"2x"	✔	–	–	✔
Episode 6 (October 24)	4	Dustin Lukat	29	"Astronaut"	–	–	–	–
Episode 6 (October 24)	5	Raya Despodovska	24	"Russian Roulette"	–	–	✔	–
Episode 6 (October 24)	6	Roman Pocta	17	"Lonely"	✔	✔	✔	✔
Episode 6 (October 24)	7	Tímea Göghova	42	"TV Glotzer"	✔	–	–	✔
Episode 6 (October 24)	8	Ophundem Nyama	19	"Get Here"	–	–	–	–
Episode 6 (October 24)	9	Marco Spöri	24	"Bruises"	✔	–	✔	✔
Episode 6 (October 24)	10	Diolem Turunc	21	"Part Of Me"	–	–	–	–
Episode 6 (October 24)	11	Simon Fetzer	52	"Jetzt"	✔	–	–	✔
Episode 6 (October 24)	12	Alisha Popat	34	"Wicked Game"	✔	✔	✔	✔
Episode 7 (October 28)
Episode 7 (October 28)	1	Laura Plösser	25	"Fuckin' Perfect"	–	–	✔	✔
Episode 7 (October 28)	2	JOEMISMO	22	"Qué Pena"	✔	–	–	–
Episode 7 (October 28)	3	Joel Zupan	27	"Cuz I Love You"	✔	✔	✔	✔
Episode 7 (October 28)	4	Louise Mayer	30	"Better When I'm Dancin'"	–	–	–	–
Episode 7 (October 28)	5	Larissa Frank	42	"Blank Space"	✔	✔	–	–
Episode 7 (October 28)	6	Dustin Wessels	23	"Vermissen"	–	–	–	–
Episode 7 (October 28)	7	Nico Lange	40	"Stuck on You"	✔	–	–	–
Episode 7 (October 28)	8	Kira Bernard	17	"Man in the Mirror"	–	✔	✔	✔
Episode 7 (October 28)	9	Sascha Salvati	36	"Lieb Mich Dann"	–	–	–	–
Episode 7 (October 28)	10	Anastasia Troska	27	"Dancing with the Devil"	–	–	–	✔
Episode 7 (October 28)	11	K'Daanso	32	"Superior"	–	–	–	–
Episode 7 (October 28)	12	Matthias Wiesner	36	"Halt Mich"	✔	✔	✔	✔
Episode 8 (October 31)
Episode 8 (October 31)	1	Dirk Weidner	45	"Zünde Alle Feuer"	✔	–	–	✔
Episode 8 (October 31)	2	Hai Mi Trân	20	"Ghost"	–	–	✔	–
Episode 8 (October 31)	3	Damian & Chris	31/28	"Roller"	–	–	–	–
Episode 8 (October 31)	4	Max Hofmann	27	"Last Resort"	✔	✔	✔	✔
Episode 8 (October 31)	5	Lea-Christin Wilhelmus	38	"Tim Liebt Tina"	–	–	–	–
Episode 8 (October 31)	6	André Stangier	21	"Afterglow"	–	✔	–	✔
Episode 8 (October 31)	7	Jill Fischer	26	"Locomotive"	–	–	–	–
Episode 8 (October 31)	8	Patrick Rokitensky	32	"Regen und Meer"	✔	–	–	–
Episode 8 (October 31)	9	Christoph Rieger	27	"Wenn Worte meine Sprache wären"	–	–	–	–
Episode 8 (October 31)	10	Laila Ghaleb	20	"I Could Have Danced All Night"	✔	✔	✔	✔
Episode 8 (October 31)	11	Marina Vavoura	17	"Peaches"	✔	✔	✔	–
Episode 8 (October 31)	12	Perry Beenen	31	"Superstition"	✔	✔	–	–
Episode 9 (November 4)
Episode 9 (November 4)	1	Maximilian Theiss	21	"Stay"	✔	✔	–	✔
Episode 9 (November 4)	2	Nadja Fingerhuth	34	"Before He Cheats"	–	–	–	✔
Episode 9 (November 4)	3	Julian Schmidt	20	"Übermorgen"	–	–	–	–
Episode 9 (November 4)	4	Sang-Ji Lee	19	"Godzilla"	✔	✔	✔	✔
Episode 9 (November 4)	5	Nico Röwenstrunk	47	"Amarillo By Morning"	–	–	–	–
Episode 9 (November 4)	6	Jonas Eisemann	26	"Undercover Martyn"	✔	✔	–	✔
Episode 9 (November 4)	7	Lilli Venskeviciutė	28	"Uptown Funk"	–	–	–	–
Episode 9 (November 4)	8	Mazen Mohsen	27	"Die Gedanken Sind Frei"	✔	–	–	–
Episode 9 (November 4)	9	Sabine Wagener	26	"Time Is Running Out"	–	–	–	–
Episode 9 (November 4)	10	Patrick Aretz	25	"Julia"	✔	–	– ^{1}	✔
Episode 9 (November 4)	11	Sophie Platiel	26	"1A"	–	–	✔	–
Episode 9 (November 4)	12	Dominik Poch	30	"Save Your Tears"	–	–	–	–
Episode 9 (November 4)	13	Lena Belgart	35	"Nightingale"	✔	✔	✔	✔
Episode 10 (November 7)
Episode 10 (November 7)	1	Anna, Lisa & David	28/23/29	"Midnight Sky"	–	✔	–	–
Episode 10 (November 7)	2	Faraz Sineh	39	"Ich Will Noch Nicht Nach Hause"	–	–	–	–
Episode 10 (November 7)	3	Helin Koyuncu	25	"Lift Me Up"	–	–	–	–
Episode 10 (November 7)	4	Ron Jackson	46	"Pony"	✔	✔	✔	✔
Episode 10 (November 7)	5	Andreas Langer	29	"Deine Stärken"	–	–	Team full	–
Episode 10 (November 7)	6	Anika Lehmann	35	"Emanuela"	–	–	Team full	–
Episode 10 (November 7)	7	Jakob Wenig	26	"City Of Stars"	✔	–	Team full	–
Episode 10 (November 7)	8	Charline Klimt	29	"Empire State Of Mind"	✔	–	Team full	✔
Episode 10 (November 7)	9	Lukas Schrieber	35	"Herz Über Kopf"	–	–	Team full	Team full
Episode 10 (November 7)	10	Milijana Mijatović	26	"Habits"	–	✔	Team full	Team full
Episode 10 (November 7)	11	Babsi Pak	45	"Whole Lotta Love"	✔	Team full	Team full	Team full

- ^1 Sarah pressed her button but was too late so the turn did not count.

== Battle rounds ==
The battle rounds were recorded from September 4, 2021 to September 5, 2021 in Berlin and will broadcast from November 11, 2021 until November 21, 2021, being broadcast like the blind auditions every Thursday on ProSieben and every Sunday on Sat.1. Sarah Connor participated in the recordings via video link after testing positive for the coronavirus.

Unlike in previous seasons, each coach initially divided his participants into groups of three. Seven battles took place in Sarah Connor's 21-candidate group, and six battles each in the other three groups of 18 participants. After the rehearsals of each group of three, only two of the three candidates were usually admitted to the battle duels, the third was eliminated. The respective coach selected a participant of each battle directly into the next phase. The defeated battle participants could be taken over by the other coaches via "Steal Deal". Each coach has only one steal throughout the battles, as opposed to two on the previous season. If more than one coach wanted to take on a candidate, the participant chose one of them as his new coach. Elif selected four more participants from all battles for the third phase of the Comeback Stage.

Battle rounds color key
Artist won the Battle and advanced to the Sing-offs
Artist lost the Battle but was stolen by another coach and advances to the Sing-offs
Artist lost the Battle but got a second chance to compete in "Comeback Stage"
Artist lost the Battle and was eliminated
Artist eliminated before the battle rounds

Battles results
Episode	Coach	Order	Winner	Song	Loser	'Steal' result			
Episode	Coach	Order	Winner	Song	Loser	Mark	Nico	Sarah	Johannes
Episode 11 (November 11)	Sarah	1	Katarina Mihaljević	"Crazy Love"	Katy Weber	–	–	—N/a	–
Episode 11 (November 11)	Sarah	1	Katarina Mihaljević	"Crazy Love"	Raya Despodovska	–	–	—N/a	–
Episode 11 (November 11)	Johannes	2	Martin Bollig	"Weinst du"	Nico Grund	–	–	–	—N/a
Episode 11 (November 11)	Johannes	2	Martin Bollig	"Weinst du"	Patrick Aretz	–	–	–	—N/a
Episode 11 (November 11)	Nico	3	Azarel Gottfried	"Con Calma"	Milijana Mijatović	–	—N/a	–	–
Episode 11 (November 11)	Nico	3	Azarel Gottfried	"Con Calma"	Taiga Trece	–	—N/a	–	–
Episode 11 (November 11)	Mark	4	Karen Tepperis	"Piano Man"	Jonas Eisemann	—N/a	–	–	–
Episode 11 (November 11)	Mark	4	Karen Tepperis	"Piano Man"	Nico Lange	—N/a	–	–	–
Episode 11 (November 11)	Johannes	5	Sebastian Krenz	"Walk This Way"	Max Hofmann	–	–	–	—N/a
Episode 11 (November 11)	Johannes	5	Sebastian Krenz	"Walk This Way"	Nadja Fingerhuth	–	–	–	—N/a
Episode 11 (November 11)	Sarah	6	Archippe Ombang	"Stand Up"	Ann Sophie	✔	–	—N/a	✔
Episode 11 (November 11)	Sarah	6	Archippe Ombang	"Stand Up"	Jennifer Williams	–	✔	—N/a	Team full
Episode 12 (November 14)	Johannes	1	Lena Belgart	"This Is Me"	Charline Klimt	–	Team full	–	Team full
Episode 12 (November 14)	Johannes	1	Lena Belgart	"This Is Me"	Anastasia Troska	–	Team full	–	Team full
Episode 12 (November 14)	Sarah	2	Noordin Derbali	"That's What I Like"	Ron Jackson	–	Team full	—N/a	Team full
Episode 12 (November 14)	Sarah	2	Noordin Derbali	"That's What I Like"	Luna Farina	✔	Team full	—N/a	Team full
Episode 12 (November 14)	Mark	3	Alex Kerski	"Umbrella"	Babsi Pak	Team full	Team full	–	Team full
Episode 12 (November 14)	Mark	3	Alex Kerski	"Umbrella"	Tímea Göghova	Team full	Team full	–	Team full
Episode 12 (November 14)	Johannes	4	Dirk Weidner	"Mensch"	Norman Ebel	Team full	Team full	–	Team full
Episode 12 (November 14)	Johannes	4	Dirk Weidner	"Mensch"	Matthias Wiesner	Team full	Team full	–	Team full
Episode 12 (November 14)	Nico	5	Sang-Ji Lee	"Home"	André Stangier	Team full	Team full	–	Team full
Episode 12 (November 14)	Nico	5	Sang-Ji Lee	"Home"	Roman Pocta	Team full	Team full	–	Team full
Episode 12 (November 14)	Sarah	6	Anouar Chauech	"You Are the Reason"	Jacqueline Büthe	Team full	Team full	—N/a	Team full
Episode 12 (November 14)	Sarah	6	Anouar Chauech	"You Are the Reason"	Hai Mi Trân	Team full	Team full	—N/a	Team full
Episode 13 (November 18)	Nico	1	Kati Lamberts	"Wings"	Maximilian Theiss	Team full	Team full	–	Team full
Episode 13 (November 18)	Nico	1	Kati Lamberts	"Wings"	Will Church	Team full	Team full	–	Team full
Episode 13 (November 18)	Mark	2	The Razzzones	"Beggin'"	Marco Spöri	Team full	Team full	–	Team full
Episode 13 (November 18)	Mark	2	The Razzzones	"Beggin'"	JOEMISMO	Team full	Team full	✔	Team full
Episode 13 (November 18)	Sarah	3	Anton Verzani	"Nie gesagt"	Sophie Platiel	Team full	Team full	Team full	Team full
Episode 13 (November 18)	Sarah	3	Anton Verzani	"Nie gesagt"	Kira Bernard	Team full	Team full	Team full	Team full
Episode 13 (November 18)	Mark	4	Chris Gogler	"Bette Davis Eyes"	Jakob Wenig	Team full	Team full	Team full	Team full
Episode 13 (November 18)	Mark	4	Chris Gogler	"Bette Davis Eyes"	Mazen Mohsen	Team full	Team full	Team full	Team full
Episode 13 (November 18)	Sarah	5	Joel Zupan	"I Wanna Be Your Slave"	Laila Ghaleb	Team full	Team full	Team full	Team full
Episode 13 (November 18)	Sarah	5	Joel Zupan	"I Wanna Be Your Slave"	Jennifer Hans	Team full	Team full	Team full	Team full
Episode 13 (November 18)	Nico	6	Julia & Barbara	"Cover Me in Sunshine"	Marina Vavoura	Team full	Team full	Team full	Team full
Episode 13 (November 18)	Nico	6	Julia & Barbara	"Cover Me in Sunshine"	Laura & Sophie	Team full	Team full	Team full	Team full
Episode 13 (November 18)	Johannes	7	Zeynep Avci	"Durch die schweren Zeiten"	Alisha Popat	Team full	Team full	Team full	Team full
Episode 13 (November 18)	Johannes	7	Zeynep Avci	"Durch die schweren Zeiten"	Simon Fetzer	Team full	Team full	Team full	Team full
Episode 14 (November 21)	Johannes	1	Linda Elsener	"Girls Like Us"	Naomi Maier	Team full	Team full	Team full	Team full
Episode 14 (November 21)	Johannes	1	Linda Elsener	"Girls Like Us"	Laura Plösser	Team full	Team full	Team full	Team full
Episode 14 (November 21)	Mark	2	Florian & Charlene	"Higher Power"	Perry Beenen	Team full	Team full	Team full	Team full
Episode 14 (November 21)	Mark	2	Florian & Charlene	"Higher Power"	Peter Hoebertz	Team full	Team full	Team full	Team full
Episode 14 (November 21)	Sarah	3	Robert Cotton	"Great Balls of Fire"	Ilho Cho	Team full	Team full	Team full	Team full
Episode 14 (November 21)	Sarah	3	Robert Cotton	"Great Balls of Fire"	Oliver Zinhobl	Team full	Team full	Team full	Team full
Episode 14 (November 21)	Mark	4	Stefanie Black	"Ohne Dich (schlaf' ich heut' Nacht nicht ein)"	Patrick Rokitensky	Team full	Team full	Team full	Team full
Episode 14 (November 21)	Mark	4	Stefanie Black	"Ohne Dich (schlaf' ich heut' Nacht nicht ein)"	Mia Sternberger	Team full	Team full	Team full	Team full
Episode 14 (November 21)	Nico	5	Robin Becker	"7 Stunden"	Lisa & David	Team full	Team full	Team full	Team full
Episode 14 (November 21)	Nico	5	Robin Becker	"7 Stunden"	Tillmann Urbaniak	Team full	Team full	Team full	Team full
Episode 14 (November 21)	Nico	6	Gugu Zulu	"Titanium"	Larissa Frank	Team full	Team full	Team full	Team full
Episode 14 (November 21)	Nico	6	Gugu Zulu	"Titanium"	Natascha Ronowski	Team full	Team full	Team full	Team full

== Sing-offs ==
The sing-off phase will be broadcast live on television; in all previous seasons it had been recorded. It will take place in two events on 25 and 28 November 2021 in Berlin. Each of the 28 remaining participants will perform a song. Two candidates from each coaching group are selected by audience voting, then the coach selects a third participant from his group for the Live shows. Elif selects a total of three further participants from all groups for the fourth round of the Comeback Stage. Anton Verzani, from Team Sarah, will not be participating in the live shows for personal reasons. On the afternoon of November 28, it was announced that Anouar Chauech from Sarah Connor's team would not be admitted to the Sing Offs because he had repeatedly violated values and rules.

Sing-offs color key
Artist was saved by public's vote
Artist was saved by the coach's decision
Artist lost the Sing Off but got a second chance to compete in "Comeback Stage"
Artist was eliminated

Sing-offs results
Episode	Coach	Order	Artist	Song	Result
Episode 15 (November 25)	Nico	1	Robin Becker	"Auf anderen Wegen"	Eliminated
Episode 15 (November 25)	Nico	2	Julia & Barbara	"Thursday"	Eliminated
Episode 15 (November 25)	Nico	3	Jennifer Williams	"Chain of Fools"	Nico's choice
Episode 15 (November 25)	Nico	4	Sang-Ji Lee	"Stay"	Eliminated
Episode 15 (November 25)	Nico	5	Kati Lamberts	"Your Song"	Public's vote
Episode 15 (November 25)	Nico	6	Azarel Gottfried	"El barco"	Eliminated
Episode 15 (November 25)	Nico	7	Gugu Zulu	"I Was Here"	Public's vote
Episode 15 (November 25)	Johannes	1	Sebastian Krenz	"Always"	Public's vote
Episode 15 (November 25)	Johannes	2	Lena Belgart	"If I Ain't Got You"	Eliminated
Episode 15 (November 25)	Johannes	3	Martin Bollig	"In diesem Moment"	Eliminated
Episode 15 (November 25)	Johannes	4	Zeynep Avci	"Kıyamam"	Johannes's choice
Episode 15 (November 25)	Johannes	5	Linda Elsener	"You Don't Know"	Eliminated
Episode 15 (November 25)	Johannes	6	Dirk Weidner	"Blueprint"	Eliminated
Episode 15 (November 25)	Johannes	7	Ann Sophie	"Creep"	Public's vote
Episode 16 (November 28)	Mark	1	Luna Farina	"Purple Rain"	Public's vote
Episode 16 (November 28)	Mark	2	Chris Gogler	"Blackbird"	Eliminated
Episode 16 (November 28)	Mark	3	The Razzzones	"Dickes B"	Mark's choice
Episode 16 (November 28)	Mark	4	Karen Tepperis	"Always Remember Us This Way"	Eliminated
Episode 16 (November 28)	Mark	5	Stefanie Black	"Mit jedem Herzschlag"	Eliminated
Episode 16 (November 28)	Mark	6	Alex Kerski	"Good 4 U"	Eliminated
Episode 16 (November 28)	Mark	7	Florian & Charlene	"The Best"	Public's vote
Episode 16 (November 28)	Sarah	1	Noordin Derbali	"Cry Me a River"	Eliminated
Episode 16 (November 28)	Sarah	2	Robert Cotton	"Rock This House"	Eliminated
Episode 16 (November 28)	Sarah	3	Katarina Mihaljević	"All I Ask"	Public's vote
Episode 16 (November 28)	Sarah	4	Joel Zupan	"Sweet Transvestite"	Sarah's choice
Episode 16 (November 28)	Sarah	5	JOEMISMO	"Bandoleros"	Eliminated
Episode 16 (November 28)	Sarah	6	Archippe Ombang	"What a Wonderful World"	Public's vote

Non-competition performances
Order	Performer	Song
15.1	Nico Santos & his team	"Would I Lie to You"
15.2	Johannes Oerding & his team	"Kreise"
16.1	Mark Forster & his team	"Mellow Mellow"
16.2	Sarah Connor & her team	"Vincent"

== Comeback stage ==
This season's fifth coach, Elif Demirezer, selected artists who did not make a team during the blind auditions, as well as eliminated artists from later rounds of the competition, thus creating new rounds to The Voice: Comeback Stage by SEAT, exclusive to thevoiceofgermany.de. The two winners compete in the live shows against the talents of the main coaches (Forster, Santos, Connor, and Oerding), singing for a chance to win the eleventh season of The Voice of Germany.

Comeback Stage color key
Artist won the battle and advanced to the next round
Artist lost the battle and was eliminated
Artist won The Comeback Stage and advanced to the Live shows

=== First round ===
During the first round of competition, the eight selected artists from Blind auditions went head to head, two artists per episode, and Demirezer selected a winner to move on to the next round.

First round results
Episode	Coach	Order	Artist	Song	Result
Episode 1 & 2 (October 7 & 14)	Elif	1	Salomé Stresing	"Levitating"	Advanced
Episode 1 & 2 (October 7 & 14)	Elif	2	Felix Breßmer	"Chocolate"	Eliminated
Episode 3 (October 21)	Elif	1	Raffi Kerz	"Blank Space"	Eliminated
Episode 3 (October 21)	Elif	2	Mathis Kloss	"Bad Habits"	Advanced
Episode 4 (October 28)	Elif	1	Ophundem Nyama	"Who You Are"	Advanced
Episode 4 (October 28)	Elif	2	Myriam Benoun	"Lose You to Love Me"	Eliminated
Episode 5 (November 4)	Elif	1	Sascha Salvati	"Say My Name"	Advanced
Episode 5 (November 4)	Elif	2	Christoph Rieger	"Ultraleicht"	Eliminated

=== Second round ===
In the second round, the four remaining artists chose another song to sing, with two of them advancing to the next round.

Second round results
Episode	Coach	Order	Artist	Song	Result
Episode 6 (November 11)	Elif	1	Sascha Salvati	"Leave the Door Open"	Advanced
Episode 6 (November 11)	Elif	2	Salomé Stresing	"Deja Vu"	Eliminated
Episode 6 (November 11)	Elif	3	Ophundem Nyama	"Nobody but You"	Eliminated
Episode 6 (November 11)	Elif	4	Mathis Kloss	"Let Me Down Slowly"	Advanced

=== Third round ===
In the third round, Demirezer brought back four artists who were eliminated during the Battle rounds, giving them a chance to re-enter in the competition. These artists faced off against the two artists from the second round. At the end of the round, three of them, from any group, advances to the next round.

Third round results
Episode	Coach	Order	Artist	Song	Result
Episode 7 (November 18)	Elif	1	Hai Mi Trân	"Stuck with U"	Eliminated
Episode 7 (November 18)	Elif	1	Roman Pocta	"Stuck with U"	Eliminated
Episode 7 (November 18)	Elif	1	Sascha Salvati	"Stuck with U"	Advanced
Episode 8 (November 25)	Elif	2	Kira Bernard	"Lovely"	Eliminated
Episode 8 (November 25)	Elif	2	Mathis Kloss	"Lovely"	Advanced
Episode 8 (November 25)	Elif	2	Will Church	"Lovely"	Advanced

=== Final round ===
In the final round, the three winners of the third round competed against three eliminated artists from the Sing Offs. From these six artists, two advanced in the Semifinal.

Final round results
Episode	Coach	Order	Artist	Song	Result
Episode 9 & 10 (December 3)	Elif	1	Will Church	"In My Blood"	Eliminated
Episode 9 & 10 (December 3)	Elif	2	Linda Elsener	"Outnumbered"	Advanced
Episode 9 & 10 (December 3)	Elif	3	Mathis Kloss	"Train Wreck"	Eliminated
Episode 9 & 10 (December 3)	Elif	4	JOEMISMO	"Morado"	Eliminated
Episode 9 & 10 (December 3)	Elif	5	Lena Belgart	"Believe"	Eliminated
Episode 9 & 10 (December 3)	Elif	6	Sascha Salvati	"Falling"	Advanced

== Live shows ==
The live shows began airing on December 5, 2021 and ended on December 19, 2021 on Sat.1 and three live shows are planned in Berlin, after seasons 6 to 10 had only two live shows.

Live shows color key
Artist was saved by the public's votes
Artist was eliminated

=== Week 1: Quarterfinal (December 5) ===
The first live show was aired on December 5, 2021, with three acts from each team performing. The public chose two artists from each team to advance to the semi-final.

Week 1 results
Episode	Coach	Order	Artist	Song	Voting	Result
Episode 17 (December 5)	Mark	1	Florian & Charlene	"Sex on Fire"	39.6%	Advanced
Episode 17 (December 5)	Sarah	2	Archippe Ombang	"Love's Divine"	50.5%	Advanced
Episode 17 (December 5)	Johannes	3	Sebastian Krenz	"Who Wants to Live Forever"	42.8%	Advanced
Episode 17 (December 5)	Nico	4	Kati Lamberts	"When the Party's Over"	17.7%	Advanced
Episode 17 (December 5)	Mark	5	Luna Farina	"Levitating"	29.7%	Eliminated
Episode 17 (December 5)	Nico	6	Jennifer Williams	"(You Make Me Feel Like) A Natural Woman"	16.6%	Eliminated
Episode 17 (December 5)	Johannes	7	Ann Sophie	"Hallelujah"	28.7%	Advanced
Episode 17 (December 5)	Nico	8	Gugu Zulu	"Easy on Me"	65.7%	Advanced
Episode 17 (December 5)	Mark	9	The Razzzones	"Let Me Love You"	30.7%	Advanced
Episode 17 (December 5)	Sarah	10	Katarina Mihaljević	"Jealous"	28.7%	Advanced
Episode 17 (December 5)	Sarah	11	Joel Zupan	"Sweet Dreams"	20.8%	Eliminated
Episode 17 (December 5)	Johannes	12	Zeynep Avci	"Öyle Sev"	28.5%	Eliminated

Non-competition performances
Order	Performer	Song
1	Coaches Performance	"Feeling Good"

=== Week 2: Semifinal (December 12) ===
The semi-final aired on December 12, 2021, with the eight advanced contestants of the quarter-finals and the two contestants of the Comeback Stage selected by Elif, participated. The public chose one artist from each team to advance to the final.

An initially planned guest appearance by the band Coldplay was canceled the day before the broadcast due to COVID-19 cases in the area around the band.

Week 2 results
Episode	Coach	Order	Artist	Song	Voting	Result
Episode 18 (December 12)	Johannes	1	Sebastian Krenz	"Shallow"	67.2%	Advanced
Episode 18 (December 12)	Johannes	2	Ann Sophie	"Nothing Compares 2 U"	32.8%	Eliminated
Episode 18 (December 12)	Mark	3	The Razzzones	"Hey Ya!"	26.8%	Eliminated
Episode 18 (December 12)	Mark	4	Florian & Charlene	"Broken Strings"	73.3%	Advanced
Episode 18 (December 12)	Sarah	5	Archippe Ombang	"My Way"	45.4%	Eliminated
Episode 18 (December 12)	Sarah	6	Katarina Mihaljević	"Run"	54.6%	Advanced
Episode 18 (December 12)	Elif	7	Linda Elsener	"Free Fallin'"	51.8%	Advanced
Episode 18 (December 12)	Elif	8	Sascha Salvati	"When You Believe"	48.2%	Eliminated
Episode 18 (December 12)	Nico	9	Gugu Zulu	"Rise Up"	65.9%	Advanced
Episode 18 (December 12)	Nico	10	Kati Lamberts	"Take Me to Church"	34.1%	Eliminated

Non-competition performances
Order	Performer	Song
1	All contestants	"My Universe"
2	Mark Forster & his team (The Razzzones and Florian & Charlene)	"Chöre"
3	Rea Garvey, YouNotUs, Kush Kush	"Love makes you shine"
4	Elif Demirezer & her team (Linda Elsener and Sascha Salvati)	"Aber wo bist du"
5	Nico Santos & his team (Gugu Zulu and Kati Lamberts)	"Survivor"

=== Week 3: Final (December 19) ===
The final aired on December 19, 2021. In the final week, the five finalists performed an original duet song with their coach and a duet with a special guest.

An initially planned guest appearance by Ed Sheeran was canceled shortly before the broadcast due to COVID-19 cases in his environment. Instead, he appeared in a video with a greeting message, singing an acoustic version of the new Christmas song Merry Christmas.

Coach	Artist	Order	Original Song (feat. coach)	Order	Duet Song (with special guest)	Voting	Result
Elif	Linda Elsener	8	"How To Fall In Love"	1	"Love Under Pressure" (with James Blunt)	11.05%	Fourth place
Johannes	Sebastian Krenz	2	"What They Call Life"	7	"SOS" (with James Arthur)	36.29%	Winner
Nico	Gugu Zulu	6	"When It Goes Down"	3	"Rise" (with Calum Scott)	26.23%	Runner-up
Sarah	Katarina Mihaljević	4	"Girl In A Big Shirt"	10	"Blurry Eyes" (with Michael Patrick Kelly)	18.45%	Third place
Mark	Florian & Charlene	9	"Above And Beyond"	5	"Who's Gonna Love Me Now?" (with James Morrison)	7.98%	Fifth place

Non-competition performances
Order	Performer	Song
1	The 5 finalists	"Shake It Out"
2	Birdy	"I Only Want to Be with You"

== Elimination chart ==
Coaches color key

- Artist from Team Mark
- Artist from Team Nico
- Artist from Team Sarah
- Artist from Team Johannes
- Artist from Team Elif

Results color key

- Winner
- Runner-up
- Third place
- Fourth place
- Fifth Place
- Artist was saved by the public vote
- Artist was eliminated
- Artist did not perform on that particular week

=== Overall ===
Live show results per week
Artist	Week 1	Week 2	Week 3 Final
Sebastian Krenz	Safe	Safe	Winner
Gugu Zulu	Safe	Safe	Runner-up
Katarina Mihaljević	Safe	Safe	3rd Place
Linda Elsener		Safe	4th Place
Florian & Charlene	Safe	Safe	5th Place
Kati Lamberts	Safe	Eliminated	Eliminated (Week 2)
Sascha Salvati		Eliminated	Eliminated (Week 2)
Archippe Ombang	Safe	Eliminated	Eliminated (Week 2)
The Razzzones	Safe	Eliminated	Eliminated (Week 2)
Ann Sophie	Safe	Eliminated	Eliminated (Week 2)
Luna Farina	Eliminated	Eliminated (Week 1)	
Jennifer Williams	Eliminated	Eliminated (Week 1)	
Joel Zupan	Eliminated	Eliminated (Week 1)	
Zeynep Avci	Eliminated	Eliminated (Week 1)	

=== Team ===
Live shows results per team
Artist	Week 1	Week 2	Week 3 Final
Florian & Charlene	Advanced	Advanced	Fifth place
The Razzzones	Advanced	Eliminated	
Luna Farina	Eliminated		
Gugu Zulu	Advanced	Advanced	Runner-up
Kati Lamberts	Advanced	Eliminated	
Jennifer Williams	Eliminated		
Katarina Mihaljević	Advanced	Advanced	Third place
Archippe Ombang	Advanced	Eliminated	
Joel Zupan	Eliminated		
Sebastian Krenz	Advanced	Advanced	Winner
Ann Sophie	Advanced	Eliminated	
Zeynep Avci	Eliminated		
Linda Elsener		Advanced	Fourth place
Sascha Salvati		Eliminated	

== Ratings ==
Timeslot are CEST (UTC+2) for episodes 1 to 7 and CET (UTC+1) for episodes 8 to 19.

Episode		Date	Timeslot	Channel	Viewers (in millions)		Share (in %)		Source
Episode		Date	Timeslot	Channel	Total	14 - 49 Years	Total	14 - 49 Years	Source
1	"Blind Auditions"	October 7, 2021	Thursday 8:15 pm	ProSieben	2.14	0.99	8.5	16.1	
2	"Blind Auditions"	October 10, 2021	Sunday 8:15 pm	Sat.1	2.63	1.00	9.6	13.9	
3	"Blind Auditions"	October 14, 2021	Thursday 8:15 pm	ProSieben	2.07	0.91	8.0	14.6	
4	"Blind Auditions"	October 17, 2021	Sunday 8:15 pm	Sat.1	2.35	0.92	8.1	11.9	
5	"Blind Auditions"	October 21, 2021	Thursday 8:15 pm	ProSieben	2.38	1.05	9.0	16.7	
6	"Blind Auditions"	October 24, 2021	Sunday 8:15 pm	Sat.1	2.42	1.00	8.2	12.7	
7	"Blind Auditions"	October 28, 2021	Thursday 8:15 pm	ProSieben	1.83	0.82	7.1	13.1	
8	"Blind Auditions"	October 31, 2021	Sunday 8:15 pm	Sat.1	1.95	0.72	7.1	10.6	
9	"Blind Auditions"	November 4, 2021	Thursday 8:15 pm	ProSieben	2.11	0.96	7.8	14.5	
10	"Blind Auditions"	November 7, 2021	Sunday 8:15 pm	Sat.1	2.36	0.93	8.0	11.6	
11	"Battle Rounds"	November 11, 2021	Thursday 8:15 pm	ProSieben	1.79	0.78	6.8	12.1	
12	"Battle Rounds"	November 14, 2021	Sunday 8:15 pm	Sat.1	1.79	0.85	6.2	10.9	
13	"Battle Rounds"	November 18, 2021	Thursday 8:15 pm	ProSieben	1.22	0.53	5.2	8.9	
14	"Battle Rounds"	November 21, 2021	Sunday 8:15 pm	Sat.1	1.71	0.74	5.9	9.3	
15	"Sing Offs"	November 25, 2021	Thursday 8:15 pm	ProSieben	1.52	0.59	6.0	9.5	
16	"Sing Offs"	November 28, 2021	Sunday 8:15 pm	Sat.1	1.49	0.63	5.2	7.8	
17	"Live Shows"	December 5, 2021	Sunday 8:15 pm	Sat.1	1.42	0.50	5.1	6.8	
18	"Live Shows"	December 12, 2021	Sunday 8:15 pm	Sat.1	1.50	0.58	5.6	8.1	
19	"Live Shows"	December 19, 2021	Sunday 8:15 pm	Sat.1	1.70	0.64	6.2	8.9	
