= Plan A =

Plan A may refer to:

- Plan A (Johannes Oerding album), 2022
- Plan A (Lil Tecca album), 2024
- "Plan A" (The Dandy Warhols song), 2003
- "Plan A" (Paulo Londra song), 2022
- "Plan A: Captain Cook", first episode of Blackadder Goes Forth
- Plan A Entertainment, South Korean independent record label
- Plan A (film), 2021

== See also ==
- Plan B (disambiguation)
