= Johannes Oerding =

German singer-songwriter

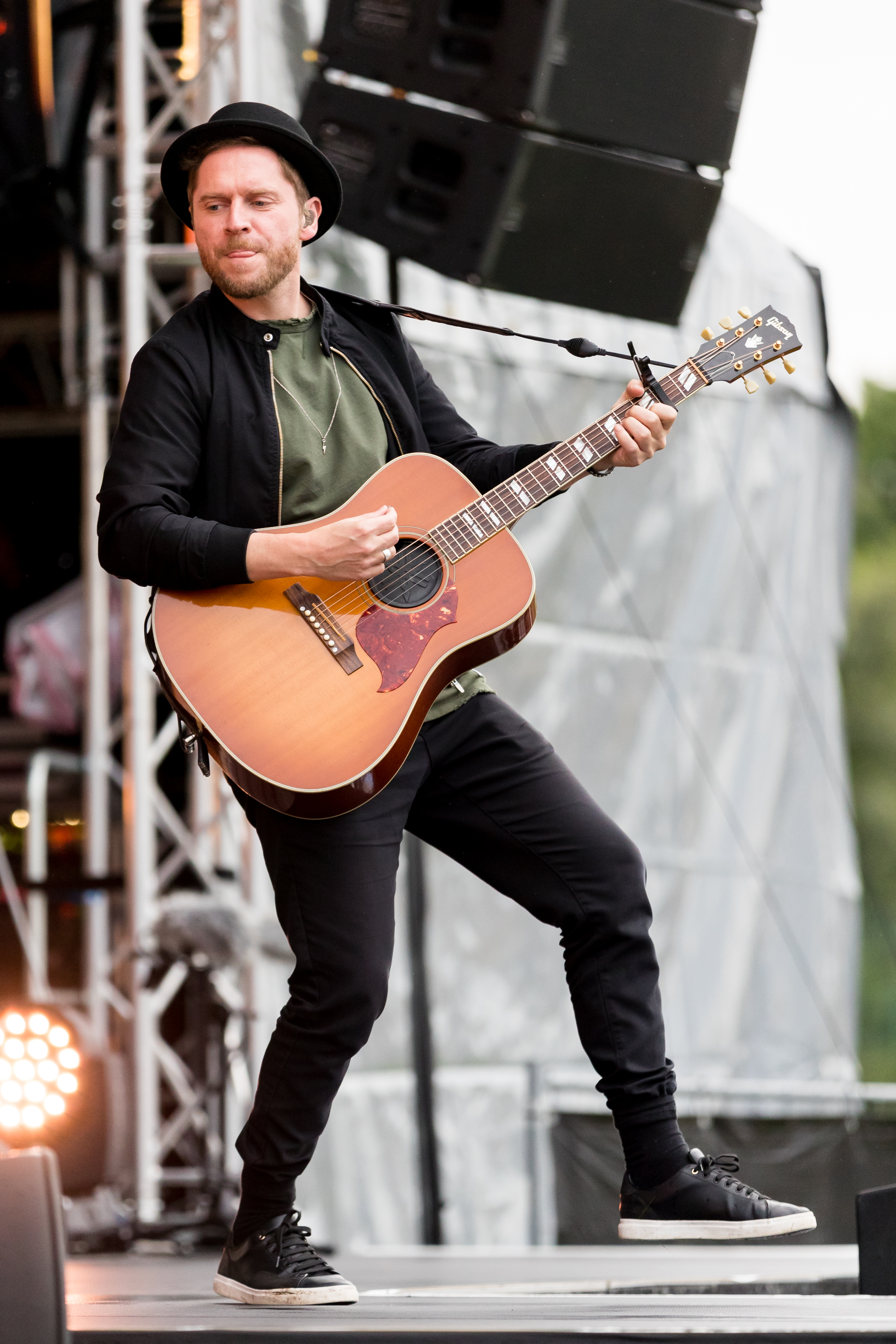
- Oerding in 2021

Background information
- Born: 26 December 1981 (age 44)
- Origin: Hamburg, Germany
- Genres: Pop
- Occupation: Singer-songwriter
- Years active: 2009–present
- Label: Columbia
- Website: www.johannesoerding.de

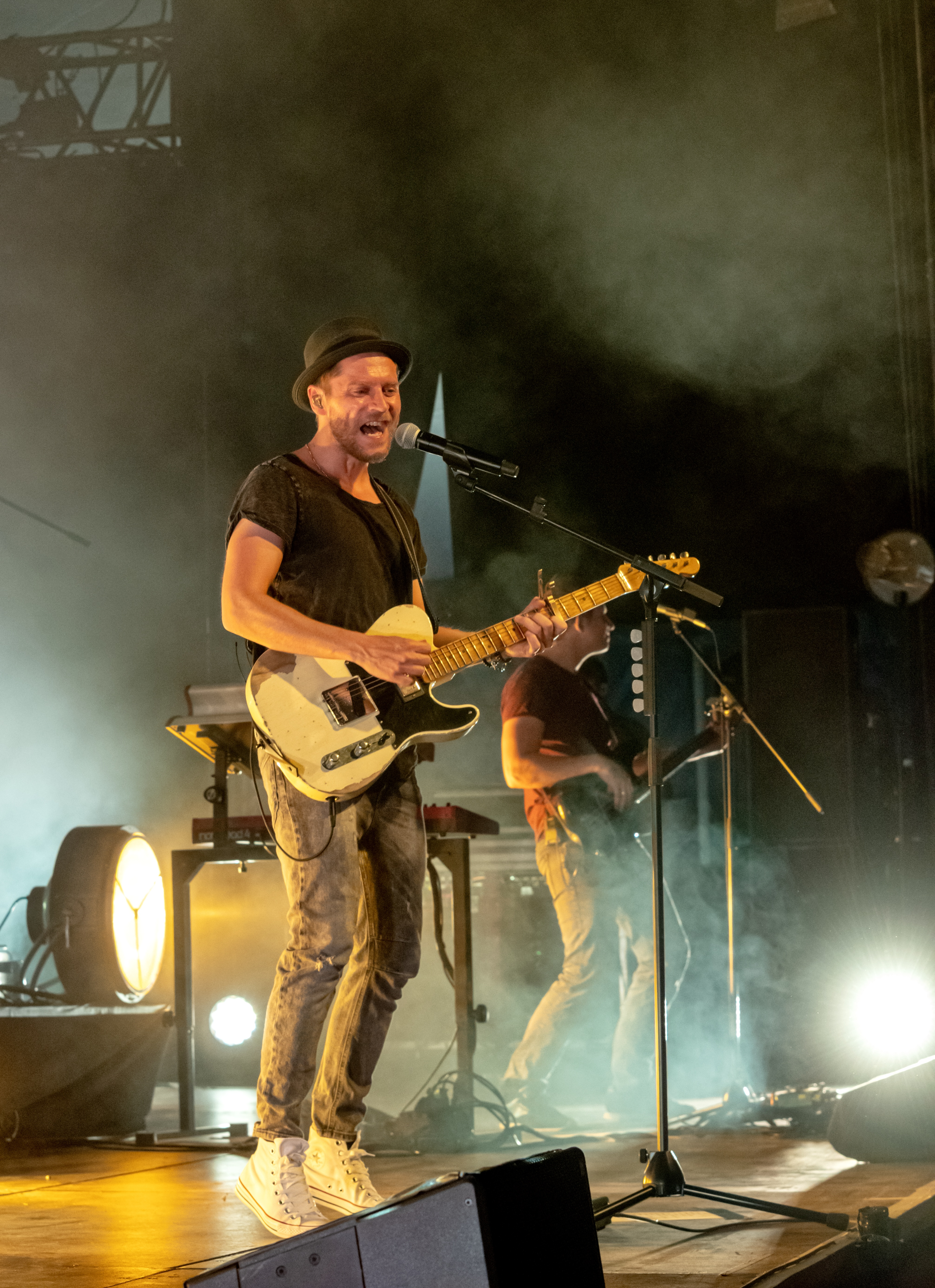
Johannes Oerding at the Zelt-Musik-Festival 2018 in Freiburg, Germany

Johannes Oerding (born 26 December 1981) is a German singer-songwriter. He primarily records his work in German.

== Early life ==
Oerding was born in Münster, North Rhine-Westphalia and raised in Geldern-Kapellen near the border of the Netherlands. His father is a country doctor, while his mother is a nurse. Oerding has two brothers and two sisters.

Oerding was discovered in 1999, when he performed at a local block party in Iserlohn. Later, he moved to the Netherlands to earn a diploma in International Marketing at Fontys University of Applied Sciences in Venlo. In 2006, he relocated to Hamburg to pursue a professional music career. There, he met singer-songwriter Michy Reincke, his neighbor at his new home in Barmbek-Süd, who garnered Oerding his first gigs.

== Career ==
In 2009, Oerding released his first single "Die Tage werden anders sein" on Columbia Records. The same year, his debut album Erste Wahl was released. Oerding worked with producers Mark "Big" Smith and Sven "Chef" Bünger on the majority of the album. While it failed to chart upon its initial release, a reissue of Erste Wahl, released in 2010, peaked at number 39 on the German Albums Chart when its single "Engel" received heavy radio rotation. The following year, Oerding's second album Boxer was released. It debuted at number eleven in Germany.

In 2013, Für immer ab jetzt, Oerding's third studio album, was released. It became his first top ten album in Germany, debuting at number four, and was eventually certified gold by Bundesverband Musikindustrie (BVMI). The album's first two singles, "Einfach nur weg" and "Nichts geht mehr", both entered the German Singles Chart. In September 2013, Oerding represented Hamburg with "Nichts geht mehr" in the Bundesvision Song Contest 2013; he finished second in the contest.

In 2015, Oerding released his fourth album Alles brennt. It debuted at number three on the German Albums Charts, marking his highest-charting album yet. It was eventually certified gold by Bundesverband Musikindustrie (BVMI).

In 2021, he was a coach on the eleventh season of The Voice of Germany and won along with his artist Sebastian Krenz.

== Discography ==
=== Studio albums ===
Title	Album details	Peak positions			Certifications
Title	Album details	GER	AUT	SWI	Certifications
Erste Wahl	Released: 2009; Label: Columbia; Formats: CD, digital download	39	—	—	BVMI: Gold
Boxer	Released: 2011; Label: Columbia; Formats: CD, digital download	11	—	—	
Für immer ab jetzt	Released: 2013; Label: Columbia; Formats: CD, digital download	4	71	93	BVMI: Gold
Alles brennt	Released: 2015; Label: Columbia; Formats: CD, digital download	3	58	45	BVMI: 3× Gold
Kreise	Released: 2017; Label: Columbia; Formats: CD, digital download	2	46	20	BVMI: Platinum
Konturen	Released: 2019; Label: Columbia; Formats: CD, digital download	1	18	8	BVMI: Platinum
Plan A	Released: 4 November 2022; Label: Columbia; Formats: CD, digital download	1	35	13	
Hotel	Released: 27 March 2026; Label: Columbia; Formats: CD, digital download	1	16	12	

=== Singles ===
Year	Single	Peak chart positions			Album
Year	Single	GER	AUT	SWI	Album
2009	"Die Tage werden anders sein"	—	—	—	Erste Wahl
2009	"Für die Welt"	—	—	—	Erste Wahl
2009	"Wann wenn nicht jetzt"	—	—	—	Erste Wahl
2010	"Engel"	80	—	—	Erste Wahl (deluxe edition)
2010	"Erste Wahl"	—	—	—	Erste Wahl (deluxe edition)
2010	"Reparier'n"	—	—	—	Boxer
2010	"Boxer"	—	—	—	Boxer
2011	"Morgen"	—	—	—	Boxer
2012	"Einfach nur weg"	98	—	—	Für immer ab jetzt
2013	"Nichts geht mehr"	43	—	—	Für immer ab jetzt
2013	"Jemanden wie dich"	—	—	—	Für immer ab jetzt
2014	"Alles brennt"	20	—	34	Alles brennt
2015	"Wenn du lebst"	75	—	—	Alles brennt
2015	"Heimat"	—	—	—	Alles brennt
2015	"Das alles geht hier" (with Anna Loos)	—	—	—	Deutschland. Dein Tag
2017	"Kreise"	91	42	—	Kreise
2017	"Hundert Leben"	—	—	—	Kreise
2019	"An guten Tagen"	45	—	85	Konturen
2019	"Pyramiden" (with Sido)	38	50	47	Ich & keine Maske
