= Für immer ab jetzt =

Album by Johannes Oerding

Studio album by Johannes Oerding
- Released: January 11, 2013
- Label: Columbia
- Producer: Johannes Oerding; Sven Bünger; Mark Smith

Johannes Oerding chronology
| Boxer (2011) | Für immer ab jetzt (2013) | Alles brennt (2015) |

Für immer ab jetzt (English: Forever From Now) is the third studio album by the German singer-songwriter Johannes Oerding. It was released by Columbia Records on January 11, 2013, in German-speaking Europe.

== Track listing ==
Für immer ab jetzt track listing
| No. | Title | Writer(s) | Producer(s) | Length |
|---|---|---|---|---|
| 1. | "Wo wir sind ist oben" | Sven Bünger; Tobias Röger; Oerding | Sven Bünger; Big Smith; Oerding | 3:08 |
| 2. | "Einfach nur weg" | Smith; Oerding | Bünger; Smith; Oerding | 3:36 |
| 3. | "Magneten" | Bünger; Smith; Oerding | Bünger; Smith; Oerding | 4:15 |
| 4. | "Jemanden wie Dich" | Bünger; Smith; Oerding | Bünger; Smith; Oerding | 3:54 |
| 5. | "Sommer" | Ramond; Oerding | Bünger; Smith; Oerding | 3:36 |
| 6. | "Und wenn die Welt" | Oerding | Bünger; Smith; Oerding | 3:42 |
| 7. | "Nichts geht mehr" | Oerding | Bünger; Smith; Oerding | 2:57 |
| 8. | "Für immer ab jetzt" | Oerding | Bünger; Smith; Oerding | 3:51 |
| 9. | "Nicht genug" | Bünger; Smith; Oerding | Bünger; Smith; Oerding | 3:02 |
| 10. | "Traurig aber wahr" | Stefan Knoess; Bünger; Oerding | Bünger; Smith; Oerding | 3:12 |
| 11. | "Die dunklen Jahre" | Sebastian Madsen; Oerding | Bünger; Smith; Oerding | 3:23 |
| 12. | "Mein schönster Fehler" | Ramond; Bünger; Smith; Oerding | Bünger; Smith; Oerding | 2:55 |

Deluxe edition
| No. | Title | Writer(s) | Producer(s) | Length |
|---|---|---|---|---|
| 13. | "Nichts geht mehr" (Single Version) | Oerding | Bünger; Smith; Oerding | 2:57 |
| 14. | "Flieg mit mir" | Bünger; Smith; Oerding | Bünger; Smith; Oerding | 3:36 |
| 15. | "Schlaflos" | Oerding | Bünger; Smith; Oerding | 4:08 |
| 16. | "Für immer ab jetzt" (Band Edit) | Oerding | Bünger; Smith; Oerding | 4:14 |
| 17. | "Spring" | Smith; Oerding | Bünger; Smith; Oerding | 4:20 |

== Charts ==
Chart performance for Für immer ab jetzt
| Chart (2013) | Peak position |
|---|---|
| Austrian Albums (Ö3 Austria) | 71 |
| German Albums (Offizielle Top 100) | 4 |
| Swiss Albums (Schweizer Hitparade) | 93 |

== Certifications and sales ==
Certifications for Für immer ab jetzt
| Region | Certification | Certified units/sales |
|---|---|---|
| Germany (BVMI) | Gold | 100,000^{^} |
^{^} Shipments figures based on certification alone.
