= Kreise (album) =

Studio album by Johannes Oerding
- Released: May 5, 2017
- Length: 74:58
- Label: Columbia
- Producer: Oerding; Mark Smith

Johannes Oerding chronology
Alles brennt (2015)	Kreise (2017)	Konturen (2019)

Kreise (German: Circles) is the fifth studio album by German singer-songwriter Johannes Oerding. It was released on May 5, 2017 by Columbia Records.

== Track listing ==
Kreise track listing
No.	Title	Writer(s)	Length
1.	"Kreise"	Oerding; Fabian Römer; David Voigt	3:41
2.	"Tetris"	Oerding; Mark Smith; Benni Dernhoff	3:55
3.	"Hundert Leben"	Oerding; Dernhoff	3:46
4.	"So schön"	Oerding; Smith; Dernhoff	3:39
5.	"Leuchtschrift (Große Freiheit)"	Oerding; Moritz Stahl; Martin Jungck; Maarten Hemmen; Angela Stahl	4:19
6.	"Freier Fall"	Oerding; Dernhoff	3:28
7.	"Love Me Tinder"	Oerding; Dernhoff	4:05
8.	"Unser Himmel ist derselbe"	Oerding	3:51
9.	"Weiße Tauben"	Oerding; Samy Deluxe	3:51
10.	"Die Zeit nach der Zeit danach"	Oerding; Smith; Stahl; Dernhoff	3:51
11.	"Zieh dich aus"	Oerding	2:35
12.	"Stein für Stein"	Oerding; Smith	4:21
13.	"Nur unterwegs"	Oerding; Römer; Voigt	3:57
14.	"Zwischen Mann und Kind"	Oerding	2:51
15.	"Kreise" (Akustik Solo)	Oerding; Römer; Voigt	3:23
16.	"Hundert Leben" (Akustik Solo)	Oerding; Dernhoff	3:50
17.	"Love Me Tinder" (Akustik Solo)	Oerding	4:05
18.	"Unser Himmel ist derselbe" (Akustik Solo)	Oerding	3:43
19.	"Stein für Stein" (Akustik Solo)	Oerding; Smith	4:16
20.	"Auf die andere Seite" (Akustik Solo)	Oerding	3:22
Total length:			74:58

== Charts ==
=== Weekly charts ===
Weekly chart performance for Kreise
Chart (2017)	Peak position
Austrian Albums (Ö3 Austria)	46
German Albums (Offizielle Top 100)	2
Swiss Albums (Schweizer Hitparade)	20

=== Year-end charts ===
Year-end chart performance for Kreise
Chart (2017)	Position
German Albums (Offizielle Top 100)	30

== Certifications ==
Certifications for Kreise
Region	Certification	Certified units/sales
Germany (BVMI)	Platinum	200,000^{‡}
^{‡} Sales+streaming figures based on certification alone.
