= Konturen (album) =

Studio album by Johannes Oerding
- Released: 8 November 2019
- Length: 49:58
- Language: German
- Label: Columbia
- Producer: Benni Dernhoff; Johannes Oerding; Mark Smith

Johannes Oerding chronology
Kreise (2017)	Konturen (2019)	Plan A (2022)

Konturen (transl. Contours) is the sixth studio album by German singer-songwriter Johannes Oerding. It was released through Columbia Records on 8 November 2019. It debuted atop the German Albums Chart, becoming Oerding's first number-one album in Germany. It was supported by the single "An guten Tagen".

== Background ==
Oerding named the album Konturen (Contours) after a line in the song "Alles okay": "Und dieser Dreck auf meiner Haut ist mir endlich so vertraut. Denn diese Spuren und Konturen machen mich aus" ("And this dirt on my skin is finally so familiar to me, because these traces and contours make me"). Oerding said that with his sixth album, he wanted to find his own "profile more and more".

Oerding recorded "Ich hab dich nicht mehr zu verlieren" with singer Ina Müller, his girlfriend of 10 years. Oerding remarked that if the topic of the song were not separation, "I would not have done it, everything else I would have found extremely cheesy".

== Critical reception ==
Professional ratings
Review scores
Source	Rating
laut.de	1/5 stars
Mix1	7/8 stars
Musicheadquarter	8/9
Plattentests	2/10

Konturen received generally mixed reviews from music critics. Musicheadquarter's Andy called the album the singer's best effort to date, alongside Kreise. The website Mix1 praised the album for documenting a "maturation process" by returning to the singer's roots. In a negative review, Tony Henning of laut.de pointed out that the songs are characterized by a high level of "penetrance and pettiness" and that the record "hits the listener where it hurts the most, namely his ears". Pascal Bremmer of Plattentests described the songs as "chumming up" and that the music would fully satisfy mainstream radio listeners in its "naïvety".

== Track listing ==
Konturen track listing
No.	Title	Writer(s)	Length
1.	"An guten Tagen"	Johannes Oerding; Mark Smith; Benni Dernhoff	3:18
2.	"Alles okay"	Oerding; Thomas "X-Plosive" Kessler; Benni Dernhoff	3:29
3.	"Blinde Passagiere"	Oerding; Simon Triebel; Ali Zuckowski; Sera Finale; Daniel Flamm	4:12
4.	"Anfangen"	Oerding; Dernhoff	3:10
5.	"Unter einen Hut"	Oerding; Dernhoff	3:26
6.	"Anfassen"	Oerding; Dernhoff	4:03
7.	"Ich hab dich nicht mehr zu verlieren" (with Ina Müller)	Oerding; Müller	5:47
8.	"Besser als jetzt"	Oerding; Smith; Dernhoff	4:12
9.	"K.O."	Oerding; Finale; Flamm	3:41
10.	"Vielleicht im nächsten Leben"	Oerding; Dernhoff	3:45
11.	"All In"	Oerding	3:59
12.	"Wenn du gehst"	Oerding	3:15
13.	"Benjamin Button"	Oerding	3:41
Total length:			49:58

== Charts ==
=== Weekly charts ===
Weekly chart performance for Konturen
Chart (2019)	Peak position
Austrian Albums (Ö3 Austria)	18
German Albums (Offizielle Top 100)	1
Swiss Albums (Schweizer Hitparade)	8

=== Year-end charts ===
Year-end chart performance for Konturen
Chart (2019)	Position
German Albums (Offizielle Top 100)	45

== Certifications ==
Certifications for Konturen
Region	Certification	Certified units/sales
Germany (BVMI)	Platinum	200,000^{‡}
^{‡} Sales+streaming figures based on certification alone.

== Release history ==
Release dates and formats for Konturen
Region	Date	Edition(s)	Format(s)	Label	Ref.
Various	8 November 2019	Standard	CD; LP; digital download; streaming	Columbia	
Various	23 October 2020	Special	CD; LP; digital download; streaming	Columbia	
