= Alles brennt =

Studio album by Johannes Oerding
- Released: January 30, 2015
- Label: Columbia
- Producer: Johannes Oerding; Sven Bünger; Mark Smith

Johannes Oerding chronology
| Für immer ab jetzt (2013) | Alles brennt (2015) | Kreise (2017) |

Alles brennt (English: Everything Burns) is the fourth studio album by the German singer-songwriter Johannes Oerding. It was released by Columbia Records on January 30, 2015 in German-speaking Europe.

== Track listing ==
Alles brennt track listing
| No. | Title | Writer(s) | Producer(s) | Length |
|---|---|---|---|---|
| 1. | "Alles brennt" | Oerding; Martin Jungck | Sven Bünger; Mark Smith; Oerding | 4:56 |
| 2. | "Wenn du lebst" | Oerding; Frank Ramond; Bünger; Smith | Bünger; Smith; Oerding | 4:12 |
| 3. | "Heimat" | Oerding; Ina Müller | Bünger; Smith; Oerding | 3:00 |
| 4. | "Nie wieder Alkohol" | Bünger; Smith; Müller; Oerding | Bünger; Smith; Oerding | 3:56 |
| 5. | "Immer wieder" | Ramond; Oerding | Bünger; Smith; Oerding | 4:11 |
| 6. | "Diese Nacht gehört uns" | Bünger; Smith; Oerding | Bünger; Smith; Oerding | 3:43 |
| 7. | "Gesucht und nichts gefunden" | Oerding | Bünger; Smith; Oerding | 3:45 |
| 8. | "Plötzlich perfekt" | Oerding | Bünger; Smith; Oerding | 3:47 |
| 9. | "Turbulenzen" | Bünger; Smith; Oerding | Bünger; Smith; Oerding | 3:39 |
| 10. | "Zweites Gesicht" | Bünger; Smith; Oerding | Bünger; Smith; Oerding | 3:49 |
| 11. | "So oder gar nicht" | Ramond; Bünger; Smith; Oerding | Bünger; Smith; Oerding | 3:41 |
| 12. | "Ich will doch nicht nach Hause" | Jungck; Oerding | Bünger; Smith; Oerding | 3:58 |

== Charts ==
=== Weekly charts ===
Weekly chart performance for Alles brennt
| Chart (2015) | Peak position |
|---|---|
| Austrian Albums (Ö3 Austria) | 58 |
| German Albums (Offizielle Top 100) | 3 |
| Swiss Albums (Schweizer Hitparade) | 45 |

=== Year-end charts ===
Year-end chart performance for Alles brennt
| Chart (2015) | Position |
|---|---|
| German Albums (Offizielle Top 100) | 23 |

== Certifications ==
Certifications for Alles brennt
| Region | Certification | Certified units/sales |
|---|---|---|
| Germany (BVMI) | 3× Gold | 300,000^{‡} |
^{‡} Sales+streaming figures based on certification alone.
