= Boxer (Johannes Oerding album) =

Studio album by Johannes Oerding
- Released: January 28, 2011
- Label: Columbia
- Producer: Big Smith; Sven "Chef" Bünger

Johannes Oerding chronology
Erste Wahl (2009)	Boxer (2011)	Für immer ab jetzt (2013)

Boxer is the second studio album by German recording artist Johannes Oerding. It was released by Columbia Records on January 28, 2011 in German-speaking Europe.

== Track listing ==
Boxer track listing
No.	Title	Writer(s)	Producer(s)	Length
1.	"Tausend Menschen"	Oerding	Big Smith; Sven "Chef" Bünger	4:02
2.	"Reparier'n"	Oerding	Bünger; Smith	4:01
3.	"Morgen"	Frank Ramond; Oerding	Bünger; Smith	3:40
4.	"Sonne"	Oerding	Bünger; Smith	4:00
5.	"Erste Klasse"	Oerding	Bünger; Smith	3:29
6.	"Zurück"	Oerding	Bünger; Smith	3:34
7.	"Trotzdem"	Sven Bünger; Stefan Knoess; Oerding	Bünger; Smith	4:06
8.	"Boxer"	Oerding	Bünger; Smith	4:40
9.	"Halt mich fest"	Mark Smith; Oerding	Bünger; Smith	4:18
10.	"Ich lass dich geh'n"	Ramond; Oerding	Bünger; Smith	4:01
11.	"Wenn du mich brauchst"	Oerding	Bünger; Smith	3:30
12.	"Alles was bleibt"	Ramond; Oerding	Bünger; Smith	3:53
13.	"Gelandet"	Bünger	Bünger; Smith	3:45

== Charts ==
Chart performance for Boxer
Chart (2011)	Peak position
German Albums (Offizielle Top 100)	11
