= Erste Wahl =

Studio album by Johannes Oerding
- Released: August 21, 2009
- Length: 48:09
- Label: Columbia
- Producer: Big Smith; Sven "Chef" Bünger

Johannes Oerding chronology
Erste Wahl (2009)	Boxer (2011)

Erste Wahl (English: First Choice) is the debut studio album by German recording artist Johannes Oerding. It was released by Columbia Records on August 21, 2009 in German-speaking Europe.

== Track listing ==
Erste Wahl track listing
No.	Title	Writer(s)	Producer(s)	Length
1.	"Wenn es einen Gott gibt"	Stefan Knoess	Big Smith; Sven "Chef" Bünger	4:09
2.	"Grenzenlos"	Bünger; Sebastian Madsen; Jovanka von Willsdorf	Bünger; Smith	3:37
3.	"Erste Wahl"	Oerding	Bünger; Smith	3:13
4.	"Wann wenn nicht jetzt"	Masen Abou-Dakn; Oerding	Bünger; Smith; Oerding	4:05
5.	"Die Tage werden anders sein"	Oerding	Bünger; Smith	3:41
6.	"Lass mich allein"	Bünger; Knoess	Bünger; Smith	3:52
7.	"Lass mich los"	Oerding	Bünger; Smith	2:44
8.	"Wenn der Regen fällt"	Mark Smith; von Willsdorf; Steffi Werner	Bünger; Smith	4:14
9.	"Hotel zur Einsamkeit"	Oerding	Bünger; Smith	3:52
10.	"Für die Welt"	Bünger; Sven Lauer; Erich Karl Schilke	Bünger; Smith	4:13
11.	"So tun als ob"	Knoess	Bünger; Smith	3:57
12.	"Ich will dich nicht verlier'n"	Smith; Uli Wehner	Bünger; Smith	4:01
13.	"Im Februar"	Oerding	Bünger; Smith	2:47

Deluxe edition
No.	Title	Writer(s)	Producer(s)	Length
1.	"Engel" (Album Version)	Oerding	Big Smith; Sven "Chef" Bünger	4:48
2.	"Wenn es einen Gott gibt"	Stefan Knoess	Big Smith; Sven "Chef" Bünger	4:09
3.	"Grenzenlos"	Bünger; Sebastian Madsen; Jovanka von Willsdorf	Bünger; Smith	3:38
4.	"Erste Wahl"	Oerding	Bünger; Smith	3:14
5.	"Wann wenn nicht jetzt"	Masen Abou-Dakn; Oerding	Bünger; Smith; Oerding	4:05
6.	"Die Tage werden anders sein"	Oerding	Bünger; Smith	3:41
7.	"Lass mich allein"	Bünger; Knoess	Bünger; Smith	3:52
8.	"Lass mich los"	Oerding	Bünger; Smith	2:44
9.	"Wenn der Regen fällt"	Mark Smith; von Willsdorf; Steffi Werner	Bünger; Smith	4:14
10.	"Hotel zur Einsamkeit"	Oerding	Bünger; Smith	3:52
11.	"Für die Welt"	Bünger; Sven Lauer; Erich Karl Schilke	Bünger; Smith	4:14
12.	"So tun als ob"	Knoess	Bünger; Smith	3:58
13.	"Ich will dich nicht verlier'n"	Smith; Uli Wehner	Bünger; Smith	4:01
14.	"Im Februar"	Oerding	Bünger; Smith	2:48
15.	"Attrappe"	Sven Büringer; von Willsdorf; Oerding	Bünger; Smith	3:06
16.	"Sonne"	Oerding	Bünger; Smith	3:06
17.	"Zu zweit" (Live in Hamburg)			4:59
18.	"Erste Wahl" (Live in Hamburg)			5:52

== Charts ==
Chart performance for Erste Wahl
Chart (2009)	Peak position
German Albums (Offizielle Top 100)	39

== Certifications ==
Certifications for Erste Wahl
Region	Certification	Certified units/sales
Germany (BVMI)	Gold	100,000^{‡}
^{‡} Sales+streaming figures based on certification alone.
