= Elif Demirezer =

German singer and guitarist

Elif
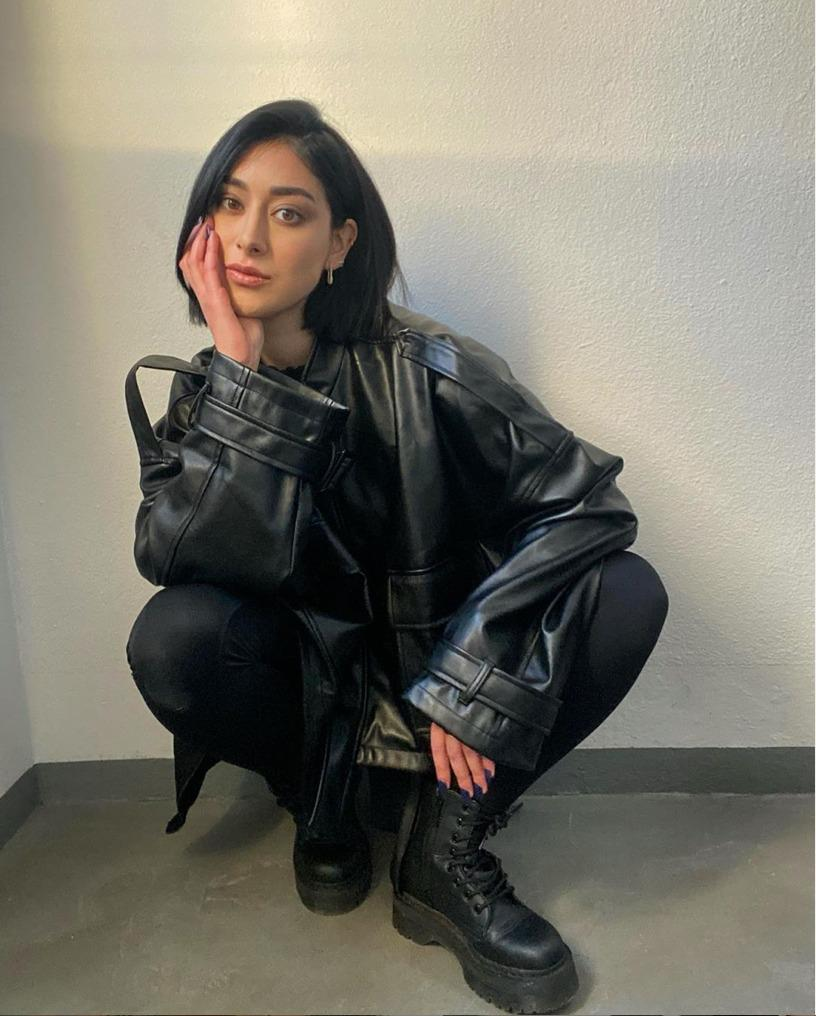
- Elif in 2020

Background information
- Born: Elif Demirezer; 12 December 1992 (age 33); Berlin, Germany
- Genres: Rock
- Occupations: Singer, songwriter, guitarist, model
- Years active: 2009–present

Elif Demirezer (born 12 December 1992), also known by her stage name ELIF, is a German rock musician and model of Turkish descent.

== Early life ==
Demirezer was born as the daughter of Turkish immigrants in Berlin and is the third of four children. She grew up in the Berlin district of Moabit and attended the OSC KIM school. In addition to performing in both the school musical and the school choir, Demirezer took guitar lessons as a teenager. It was during that time that she wrote her first songs.

== Career ==
=== Popstars ===
At 16 years old, Demirezer competed in the eighth season of the ProSieben talent show Popstars. She made joint appearances with the All American Rejects (The Wind Blows) and Cassandra Steen (Never Knew I Needed) and finished together with her partner Niklas Dennin to earn second place in the final.

Elif's performances in Popstars
Show	Song	Original artist
Casting; 10. September 2009	Fliegen; I Caught Myself	Self-composed; Paramore
Recall; 17. September 2009	–	–
Bewährungsshow; Elif und Agi vs. Esra und Julia; 17. September 2009	Stone Cold Sober	Paloma Faith
1. Workshopwoche; Elif, Elena, Esra und Manuela; 24. September 2009	Waking Up in Vegas	Katy Perry
2. Workshopwoche; Elif und Niklas; 1. Oktober 2009	Another Way to Die	Jack White und Alicia Keys
3. Workshopwoche; Elif und Aytug vs. Marc und Julia; 8. Oktober 2009	"Beautiful Liar"	Beyoncé und Shakira
4. Workshopwoche; Elif, Sandra, Andy, Esra, Daniel; 15. Oktober 2009	The Scientist	Coldplay
5. Workshopwoche; Aytug und Manuela vs. Elif und Sandra; 22. Oktober 2009	Burning Down the House	Talking Heads
Las Vegas – New York; Niklas und Elif; 29. Oktober 2009	Free Fallin'	Tom Petty
Las Vegas – New York; Elif und Dagmara; 29. Oktober 2009	Love Story	Taylor Swift
1. Bandhauswoche; Elif und Manu vs Sandra und Valentina; 5. November 2009	Bulletproof	La Roux
2. Bandhauswoche; Elif und Marc; 12. November 2009	"Rehab"	Rihanna
3. Bandhauswoche; Elif, Niklas und The All American Rejects; 19. November 2009	The Wind Blows	The All American Rejects
1. Finalphase; Elif und Niklas; 26. November 2009	Shadow of the Day	Linkin Park
1. Finalphase; Elif und Niklas; 26. November 2009	How to Save a Life	The Fray
2. Finalphase; Elif und Niklas; 3. Dezember 2009	Free Fallin'	Tom Petty
2. Finalphase; Elif und Niklas; 3. Dezember 2009	Too Perfect	Hanne Sørvaag
Halbfinale; Elif, Niklas und Cassandra Steen; 8. Dezember 2009	Never Knew I Needed	Cassandra Steen und Ne-Yo
Halbfinale; Elif, Niklas, Leonardo, Vanessa und Leona Lewis; 8. Dezember 2009	Run	Leona Lewis
Finale; Elif und Niklas; 10. Dezember 2009	We Are Broken	Paramore
Finale; Elif, Niklas und Rihanna; 10. Dezember 2009	"Don't Stop the Music"	Rihanna
Finale; Elif, Niklas, Leonardo und Vanessa; 10. Dezember 2009	Too Perfect	Hanne Sørvaag

=== Solo career ===
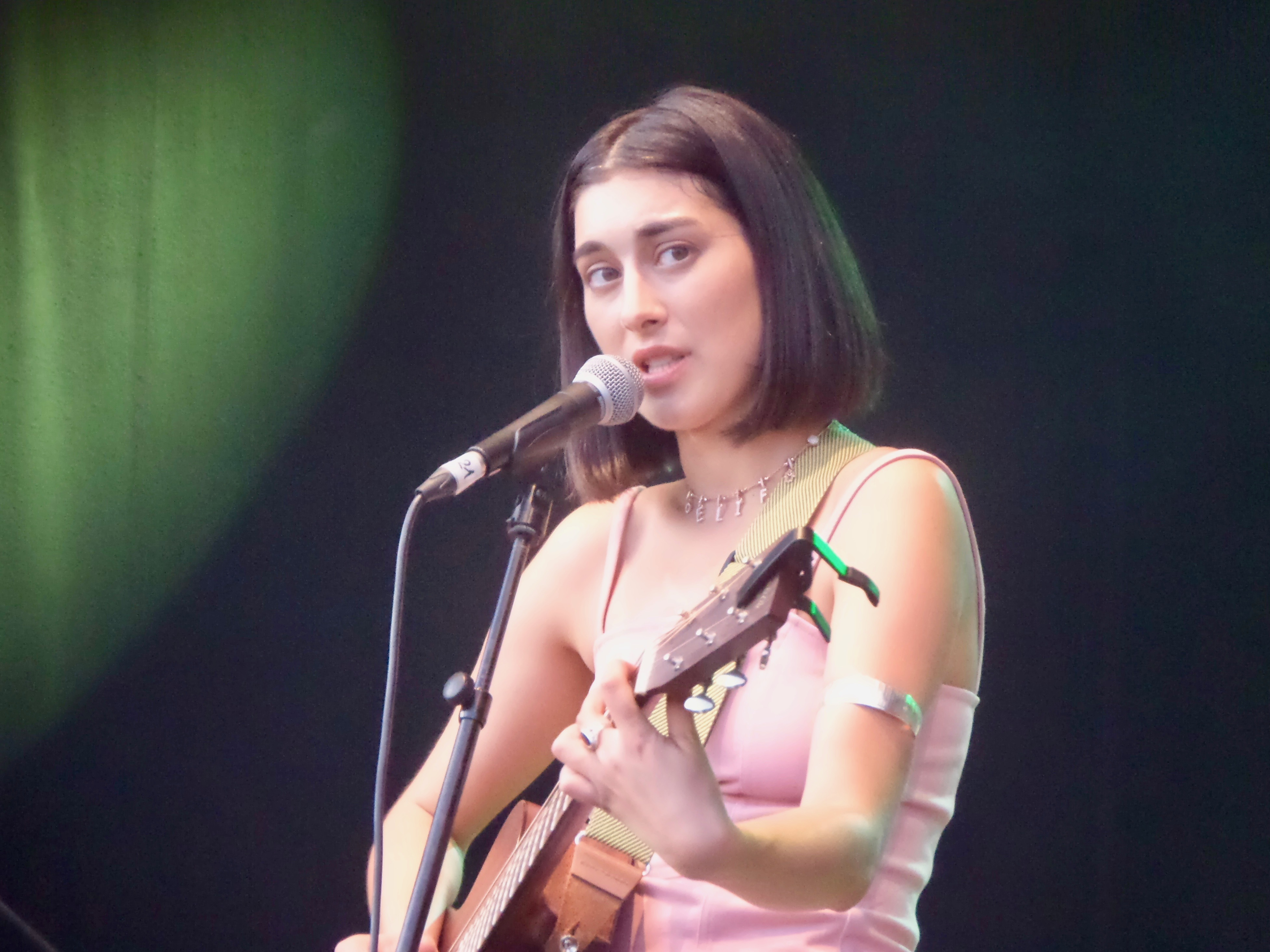
Elif in 2019

After Popstars, Demirezer reinforced her internet presence on Facebook and YouTube by introducing her own songs, which were mainly in German language. She also worked as a blogger for Webradio's "I Love Radio". In 2012, Demirezer joined Tim Bendzko for his November tour of German clubs. Later, in February 2013, Demirezer became the opening act for Ronan Keating during his tour of Germany.

Later in the year, her first single "Unter meiner Haut" (Under My Skin) was released by Universal Music, and reached number 80 in the German single charts in mid-April. On 7 April 2013, Demirezer joined Seeed, Blumio, Glass Bead Game and Andreas Bourani at the memorial concert in Admiral Palace "I Am Jonny – Voices for Our Brother" commemorating the murder of Jonny K. In early August 2013, a single entitled "200 Days Summer" was released. The video, which shows Demirezer along with tame elephants on the island of Sri Lanka, was directed by Justin Kruse, who worked with Ivy Quainoo, Max Herre, Max Prosa, Leslie Clio and Joy Dena Lane on previous productions.

At the end of August 2013, Demirezer's debut album Unter meiner Haut was released. It was produced by Demirezer herself and Philipp Schwär and reached number 23 on the German album charts. In January 2014, she completed her first tour through German clubs.

== Discography ==
=== Studio albums ===
Title	Album details	Peak chart positions		
Title	Album details	GER	AUT	SWI
Unter meiner Haut	Released: 30 August 2013; Label: Vertigo/Capitol, Universal; Formats: CD, digital download, streaming	23	—	—
Doppelleben	Released: 26 May 2017; Label: Urban, Universal; Formats: CD, digital download, streaming	18	62	—
Nacht	Released: 4 September 2020; Label: Jive Germany, Sony Music; Formats: CD, digital download, streaming	7	18	45

=== EP's ===
- 2013: Unter meiner Haut
- 2015: Als ich fortging

=== Singles ===
==== As lead artist ====
Title	Year	Peak chart positions			Certifications	Album
Title	Year	GER	AUT	SWI	Certifications	Album
"Unter meiner Haut"	2013	80	—	—		Unter meiner Haut
"Augen zu" (feat. Samra)	2020	9	28	40		Nacht

==== Other singles ====
- 2009: Last Man Standing (download only; as Nik & Elif)
- 2013: 200 Tage Sommer
- 2013: Nichts tut für immer weh (download only)
- 2015: Als ich fortging
- 2016: Auf halber Strecke
- 2017: Doppelleben
- 2017: Fort Knox
- 2020: Freunde
- 2020: Gitarre
- 2020: Nur mir
- 2020: Alaska
- 2020: Ein letztes Mal
- 2020: Kann das bitte so bleiben
- 2020: Schwarz
- 2020: Aber wo bist du
- 2021: Du liebst nur dich selbst

==== As featured artist ====
Title	Year	Peak chart positions			Certifications	Album
Title	Year	GER	AUT	SWI	Certifications	Album
"Zu Ende" (Samra feat. Elif)	2020	4	3	8		Jibrail & Iblis
"Bitte geh" (Mero feat. Elif)	2020	14	33	37		Seele

== Awards and nominations ==
=== Results ===
Year	Award	Nomination	Work	Result	Ref.
2019	Deutscher Musikautorenpreis	Nachwuchs (Sparte U)	Herself	Won	
2020	Bravo Otto Awards	Newcomer / Breakthrough	Herself	Bronze	
