= Death of Jonny K. =

2012 fatal beating of a man at Alexanderplatz in Mitte, Berlin, Germany

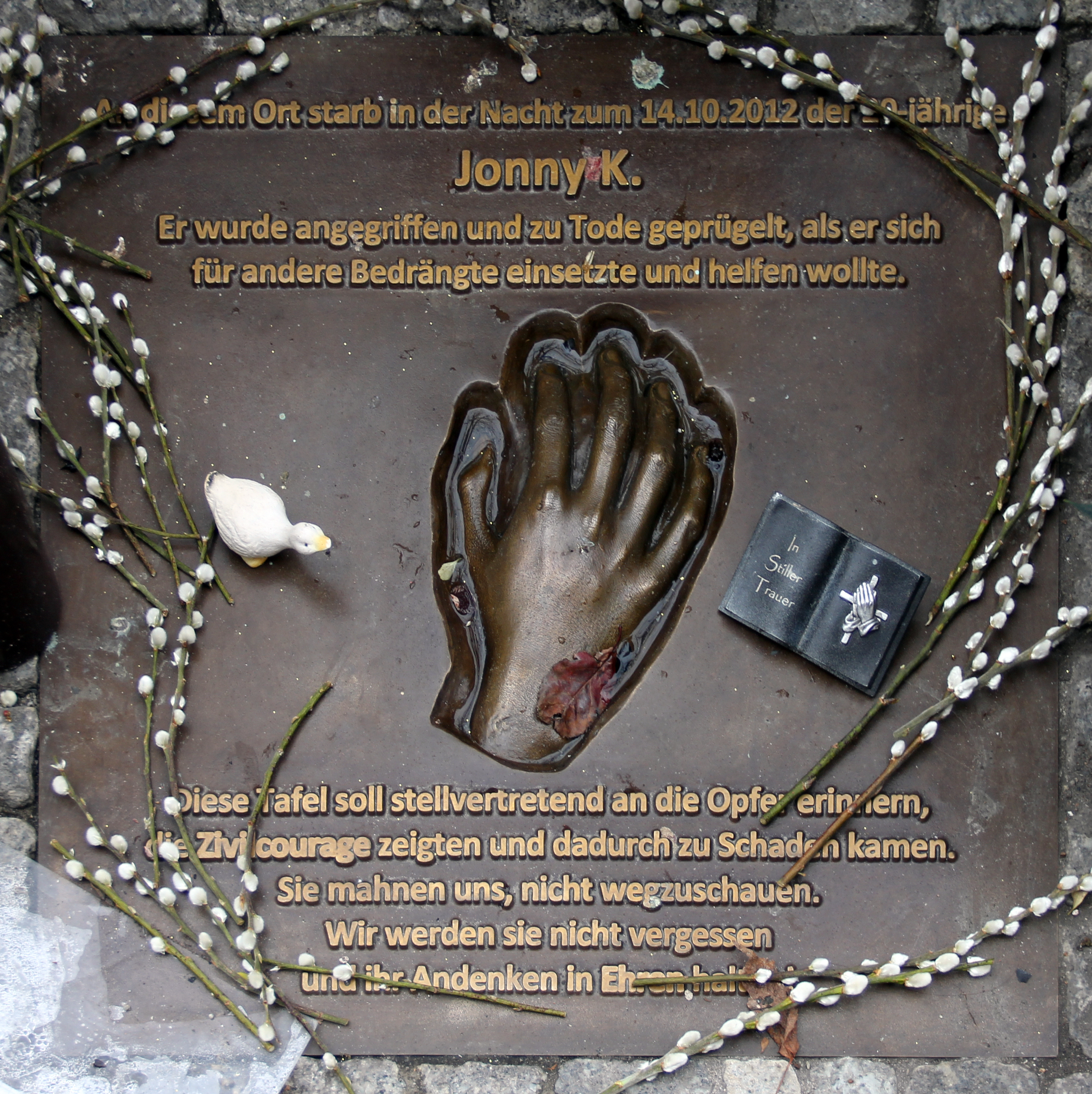
Memorial to Jonny K.

Jonny K. was a man who was fatally beaten at Alexanderplatz in Mitte, Berlin, Germany on 14 October 2012. Six people were criminally prosecuted for the beating.

Jonny K. was a 20-year-old Thai-German student. He was a Buddhist and was born in Khon Kaen, Thailand on 7 April 1992.

== Attack and arrests ==
He was with friends when one of them was attacked, and he received injuries when he attempted to intervene. The attack occurred close to a bar. Jonny K. was hospitalised before succumbing to a brain hemorrhage.

Police in Berlin arrested four of the accused while another one, Onur U., initially fled to Turkey. Onur U., a Turkish citizen, was 19 years old at the time and was an amateur boxer. He later said that he left Germany as he felt he was being presumed guilty. In April 2013 the Turkish authorities extradited Onur U. to Germany. Prosecutors stated that he was the primary culprit, as he was the first to punch the victim.

The trial began in May 2013. Two of the accused were charged with aggravated assault and the remaining ones were charged with grievous bodily harm causing death. The suspects were not charged with manslaughter or murder as the court could not determine that they planned to kill the victim. The prosecution wanted a five-and a-half-year sentence for Onur U. while the suspect said he did not hit Jonny K.

In June 2013 a mistrial was declared, therefore requiring the trial to occur again. Sentencing occurred in August 2013. Onur U., classified as a juvenile, was sentenced to four-and-a-half years. Five other men, all of ages ranging from 19 to 24, each received sentences with the highest being two years and eight months.

== Aftermath ==
According to Deutsche Welle, the killing sparked nationwide outrage and triggered a debate on youth violence.

Jonny K.'s sister, Tina K., began anti-violence advocacy. She was a co-plaintiff in the criminal case against the suspects.
