= Plan A (Johannes Oerding album) =

Studio album by Johannes Oerding
- Released: 4 November 2022
- Length: 42:23
- Language: German
- Label: Columbia

Johannes Oerding chronology
Konturen (2019)	Plan A (2022)

Plan A is the seventh studio album by German singer-songwriter Johannes Oerding. It was released through Columbia Records on 4 November 2022. The album became his second album to debut atop the German Albums Chart.

== Critical reception ==
Professional ratings
Review scores
Source	Rating
laut.de	1/5 stars

In his review for laut.de, Philipp Kause called Plan A "an embarrassing record whose predictable chart success makes others ashamed."

== Chart performance ==
Plan A became Oerdings second consecutive studio album to debut at number one on the German Albums Chart.

== Track listing ==
Plan A track listing
No.	Title	Writer(s)	Producer(s)	Length
1.	"Kaleidoskop"	Johannes Oerding; Benni Dernhoff	Oerding; Dernhoff	3:40
2.	"Porzellan"	Oerding	Oerding; Dernhoff	2:57
3.	"Plan A"	Oerding; Dernhoff	Oerding; Dernhoff	3:23
4.	"Stärker" (featuring Zeynep Avci)	Oerding; Dernhoff; Avci	Oerding; Dernhoff	3:24
5.	"Was wäre wenn"	Oerding; Dernhoff; Farsad Zoroofchi; Steffen Graef	Oerding; Dernhoff	3:22
6.	"Ecke Schmilinsky"	Oerding; Dernhoff; Moritz Stahl; Kai Lindner; Simon Gattringer; Robin Engelhardt	Oerding; Dernhoff; Stahl; Lindner; Gattringer; Engelhardt	3:11
7.	"Eins-zu-eins-Gespräch"	Oerding; Dernhoff	Oerding; Dernhoff	4:34
8.	"Vielleicht"	Oerding; Dernhoff; Yanek Stärk	Oerding; Dernhoff	3:55
9.	"Schnee von gestern"	Oerding; Dernhoff	Oerding; Dernhoff	3:13
10.	"Diese Stadt ist einsam ohne Dich"	Oerding; Dernhoff; Graef	Oerding; Graef	4:17
11.	"Santa Fu"	Oerding; Graef	Oerding; Graef	2:47
12.	"Bis der Himmel uns bestellt"	Oerding; Dernhoff; Ina Müller	Oerding; Dernhoff	3:49
Total length:				42:23

== Charts ==
=== Weekly charts ===
Weekly chart performance for Plan A
Chart (2022)	Peak position
Austrian Albums (Ö3 Austria)	35
German Albums (Offizielle Top 100)	1
Swiss Albums (Schweizer Hitparade)	13

=== Year-end charts ===
2022 year-end chart performance for Plan A
Chart (2022)	Position
German Albums (Offizielle Top 100)	27

2023 year-end chart performance for Plan A
Chart (2023)	Position
German Albums (Offizielle Top 100)	72

== Release history ==
Release dates and formats for Plan A
Region	Date	Format(s)	Label	Ref.
Various	4 November 2022	CD; LP; digital download; streaming	Columbia	
