= Sebastian Krenz =

German singer

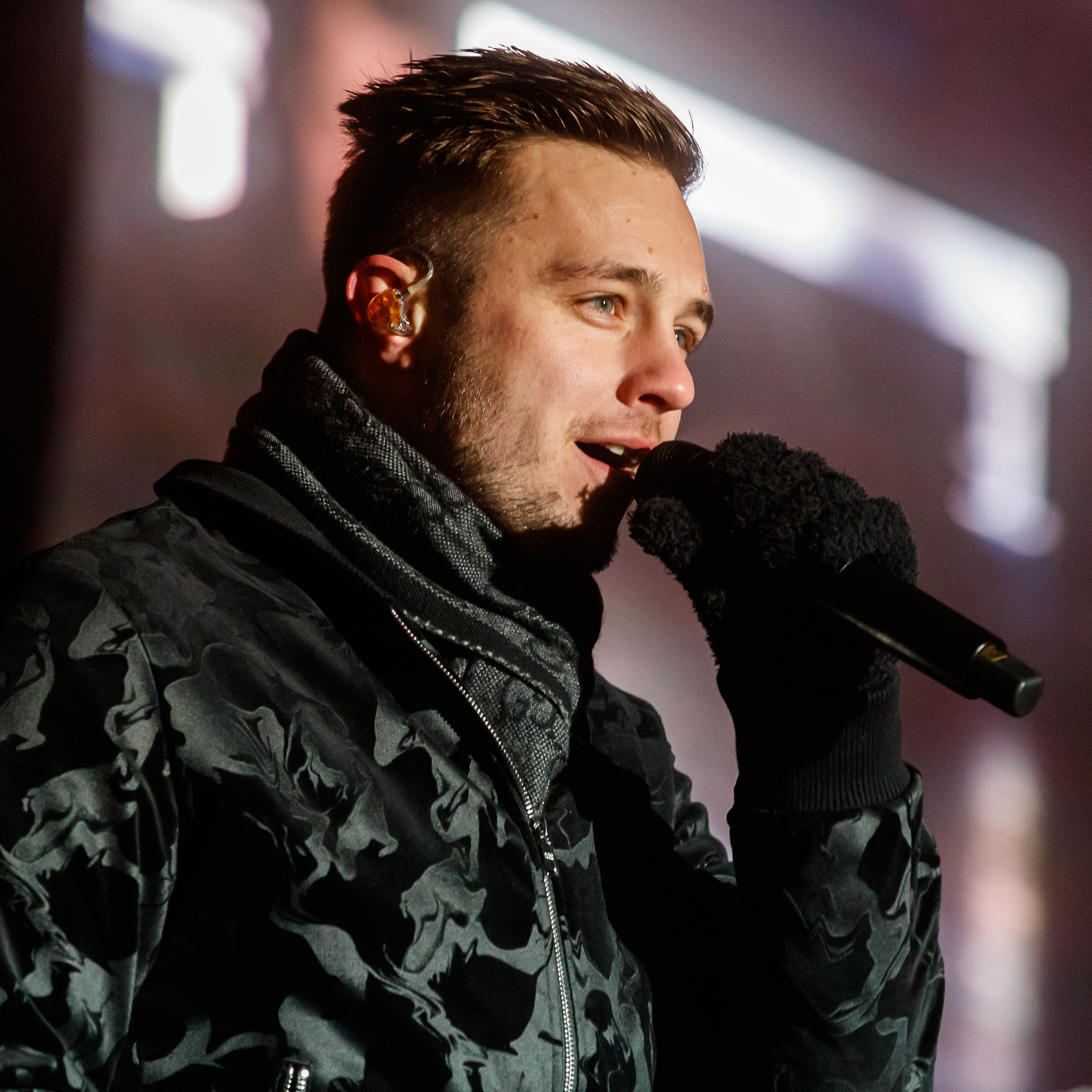
- Krenz in 2023

Background information
- Born: 1992 (age 33–34); Thuringia, Germany
- Genres: Rock
- Occupation: Singer
- Instrument: Vocals
- Years active: 2021-present
- Label

Sebastian Krenz (born 1992) is a German singer. He is the winner of the eleventh season of The Voice of Germany in 2021.

Awards and achievements
Preceded by Paula Dalla Corte	The Voice of Germany; Winner; 2021	Succeeded by Anny Ogrezeanu
