= Return of Hip Hop =

Studio album by DJ Tomekk
- Released: 12 February 2001
- Recorded: 1999–2000
- Genre: Hip hop
- Label: Fila; Modul; BMG
- Producer: DJ Tomekk

DJ Tomekk chronology
Return of Hip Hop (2001)	Beat of Life Vol. 1 (2003)

Singles from Return of Hip Hop
- 1. "1, 2, 3, ... Rhymes Galore" Released: 1999; 2. "Ich lebe für Hip Hop" Released: 2000; 3. "Return of Hip Hop (Ooh, Ooh)" Released: 2000

Professional ratings
Review scores
Source	Rating
laut.de	3/5 stars

Return of Hip Hop is the first album by hip hop producer DJ Tomekk. It was released on 12 February 2001 through Fila/Modul/BMG. Entirely produced by Tomekk, it features guest appearances from several German hip hop recording artists, including MC Rene, Torch, Afrob, Curse, Die Firma and Stieber Twins, as well as American rappers, such as Coolio, Flavor Flav, GZA, KRS-One and Prodigal Sunn. The album peaked at number 5 in Germany, number 27 in Switzerland and number 49 in Austria. It was supported with three charted singles: "1, 2, 3, ... Rhymes Galore", "Ich lebe für Hip Hop" and "Return of Hip Hop (Ooh, Ooh)".

== Track listing ==
No.	Title	Length
1.	"Intro"	1:01
2.	"Return of Hip Hop (Ooh, Ooh)" (featuring KRS-One, Torch and MC Rene)	5:23
3.	"Legends (Rauch was, trink was...)" (featuring Tony Touch)	3:54
4.	"Hot Boyz (DJ Tomekk Radio Mix)" (featuring Missy Elliott)	3:21
5.	"Run It Selectah" (featuring Prezident Brown)	4:31
6.	"The Genesis" (featuring Aphrodelics)	4:09
7.	"Girls" (featuring Coolio)	4:19
8.	"Backseat" (featuring Tikki Diamond, Traft, Plattenpapzt and MC Spontan)	3:34
9.	"Ich lebe für Hip Hop (Teil 2: Juice Crew Saga 2001)" (featuring GZA, Curse, Prodigal Sunn and Stieber Twins)	4:21
10.	"The Heat" (featuring Group Home)	2:48
11.	"1, 2, 3, ... Rhymes Galore" (featuring Grandmaster Flash, Afrob, Flavor Flav and MC Rene)	3:23
12.	"Temple of Hip Hop" (featuring Torch)	1:13
13.	"Blessed by God" (featuring Stone River)	4:18
14.	"Fuck You" (featuring MC Serch)	4:06
15.	"Kreislauf" (featuring Die Firma)	5:29
16.	"Outro" (featuring Valerie & Sophie)	0:32

Notes

The German in the titles translates to:

- Track 3 "Legends (Rauch was, trink was...)" - "Legends (Smoke Something, Drink Something...)"
- Track 4 "Ich lebe für Hip Hop (Teil 2: Juice Crew Saga 2001)" - "I Live for Hip Hop (Part 2: Juice Crew Saga 2001)"
- Track 15 "Kreislauf" - "Cycle"

== Charts ==
Chart (2001)	Peak position
Austrian Albums (Ö3 Austria)	49
German Albums (Offizielle Top 100)	5
Swiss Albums (Schweizer Hitparade)	27
