= DJ Tomekk =

Polish DJ and record producer (born 1975)

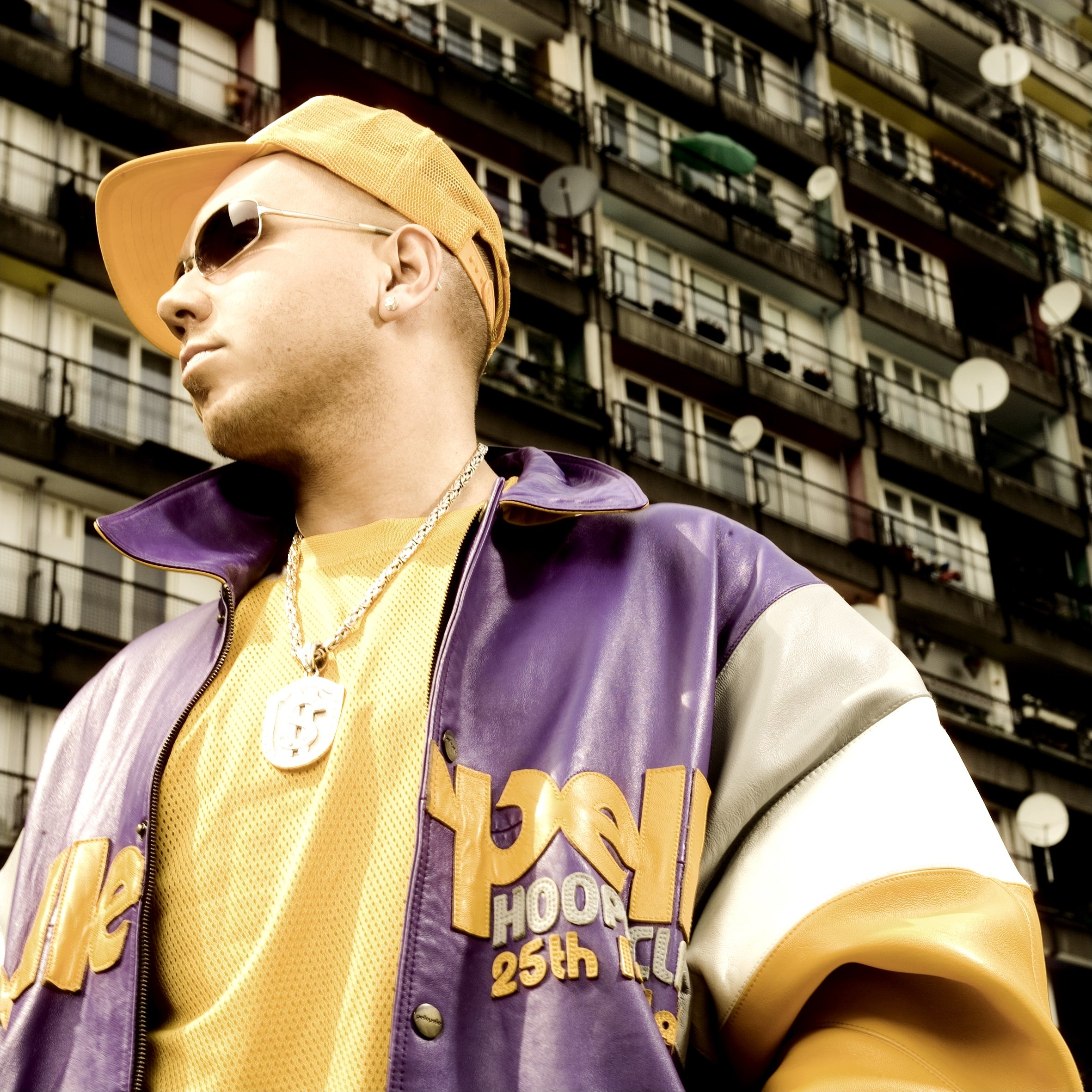
- DJ Tomekk in 2007

Background information
- Born: Tomasz Kuklicz; 11 October 1975 (age 51); Kraków, Poland
- Origin: Germany
- Genre: Hip hop
- Occupations: Record producer; DJ
- Years active: 1999–present (solo)

Tomasz Kuklicz (born 11 October 1975), known professionally as DJ Tomekk, is a Polish-born German-based hip hop DJ and record producer. Rappers who have featured in his songs include Ice-T, Fatman Scoop, Khia, Xzibit, Fler, Sido, Kurupt, Lil' Kim, KRS-One, Torch, Afrob, Flavor Flav, and GZA.

DJ Tomekk's debut album, Return of Hip Hop, was released in 2001, and was followed by Beat of Life Vol. 1 in 2003 and Numma Eyns ("Number One"; intentionally misspelled, in correct German "Nummer Eins") in 2005.

== Early life ==
Tomekk was born in Kraków, Poland. His father was a Moroccan pianist and his mother a visual artist. At the age of 10, Tomekk met a DJ for the first time and was inspired by his work. That same year, his father emigrated to Germany and Tomekk followed him to West Berlin, where he lived in Berlin's Wedding district and attended the Diesterweg High School. His father died five years later. Tomekk lived in the children's home "Frohsinn" in Wedding from the age of 15 to 18. During this time he met the rapper Sido, five years his junior. Sido would later dedicate one of his songs to Tomekk. As a teenager, Tomekk got his own radio show on 98.8 KISS FM Berlin called "Boogie Down Berlin". At 17, he made his first recording contract with Stuff Records, and in 1991 released the single "OC featuring MC Mis One".

== Career ==
=== 1992–2002 ===
In 1993, DJ Tomekk invited Kurtis Blow to Kiss FM Berlin. Coincidentally, Kurtis Blow needed a short-term replacement DJ and offered the position to Tomekk. After that, Tomekk toured with him for a year through the east and west coast of the US. While he was barely known in Germany, he already appeared in the US together with Run-DMC, Public Enemy, Ice-T, the Wu-Tang Clan, LL Cool J and KRS-One. After their US tour, Tomekk returned to Europe where he continued to tour with Blow.

In November 1993, Tomekk was honored for his work by the City of Los Angeles for Peace and International Understanding. In 1994, DJ Tomekk became the first non-US American to be nominated for the 1st Annual Rap Music Award. 5. Juli 1996 that year he toured with the band Reality Brothers and acts as opening act at Reggea Summer Jam by Ziggy Marley.

In 1996, DJ Tomekk worked with Lauryn Hill and produced the "Fu-Gee-La" remix for the Fugees.

From the mid-nineties DJ Tomekk produced his first compilations and mixtapes, where he frequently integrated American and German artists together in his songs. In 1998, he founded one of the first hip hop labels "Hip Hop Büro Berlin" with Ronny Boldt, a roommate of his flat-sharing community in Berlin Mitte. Here, first mixtapes were produced on a cassette copying machine.

In 1999, Tomekk produced the single "1, 2, 3, ... Rhymes Galore", which featured Grandmaster Flash, Flavor Flav, Afrob, Jazzy Jeff, and MC Rene. The song stayed in the German Top 10 charts for several weeks, peaking at number 6 in the German charts. 1999 he produced a remix for Jay Z's "Anything", which rose to number 9 in the US charts on the 12" vinyl "Anything (The Berlin Remixes)". His second single, "Ich lebe für Hip Hop", featured GZA, Prodigal Sunn, Curse and the Stieber Twins, and reached number 11 in Germany. In 2000, DJ received a Comet Award as the best national newcomer. In 2001, he released the single "Return of Hip Hop (Ooh, Ooh)", featuring KRS-One, Torch and MC Rene, and later that year released his first album, also entitled Return of Hip Hop.

In 2001 he went to the studio with Shaquille O'Neal. In the song "How You Like That (Ja, Ja, Ja)", Shaquille O'Neal, who spent part of his childhood in Germany, raps in a mix of English and German. Their music was used for the America-wide advertising campaign against drunk driving. That same year, he produced the single "Beat of Life" with Ice-T, which stayed in the German charts for 9 weeks, peaking at number 12.

In October of the same year, The Island Def Jam, (New York) released his remix "You and Me" by LL Cool J with a feature with ghospel singer Kelly Price and an own video by Julien Christian Lutz (Little X). In 2000, Mexico's first hip-hop band, Control Machete, released the double maxi singles Control Machete Vs. Dj Tomekk Vs. Eminem "Si señor / iles3" in Berlin, with remixes by Eminem and DJ Tomekk.

From July 2001 Tomekk ran a biofarm near Berlin with guest apartments and studios. Here artists from all over the world produce and young musicians are supported. Under his label Boogie Down Berlin he was booked by many American hip hop and RNB artists as a producer. In 2002, his song "Kimnotyze" with Lil' Kim reached number 6 in Germany.

=== 2003–2013 ===
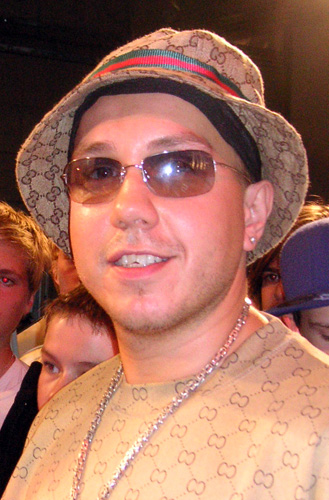
DJ Tomekk in 2005

Nothing But You was a 2003 single released by Paul van Dyk in collaboration with the British group Hemstock & Jennings, featuring trance singer Jan Johnston and Kym on vocals. The song was a reissue of Hemstrong & Jennings' 2002 single Arctic, appeared with DJ Tomekk's remix, and was featured on the EA Games Fifa Football 2004 soundtrack and its Cirrus remix in Need For Speed: Underground 2. It reached number 14 on the UK Singles Chart and number 6 on the US Hot Dance Club Play. DJ Tomekk's production for Paul van Dyk was nominated for a Grammy Award. In 2003 Snap! released a remix of their global hit "Ooops Up" produced by DJ Tomekk as a single.

In 2003, DJ Tomekk released with American rapper Kurupt the single "Ganxtaville Pt. III", which placed fifth on the German charts, as well as in the charts of Austria and Switzerland. He toured with his Boogie Down Berlin crew (DJ Noppe, Saeed, Trooper Da Don), where he completed about 150 appearances.

In the following years, DJ Tomekk worked with artists such as MC Lyte, Xzibit, Noreaga, B-Tight, Montell Jordan, Truth Hurts, Horace Brown, Black Ivory and Harris on his new album Numma Eyns, which he finally released in 2005.

2007 Missy Elliott's "Hot Boyz" maxi single was released with two DJ Tomekk remixes - one of which featured Nas.

In 2008, Tomekk featured in the third series of German reality show Ich bin ein Star – Holt mich hier raus! but was evicted by RTL Television for making a Nazi salute and singing "Deutschland über Alles". In response, Tomekk stated his actions were clearly a joke that was not intended to incite racism, noting among other things that his wife is African.

On the occasion of their 20th stage anniversary, DJ Tomekk and Kurtis Blow jointly released the single "The Legendary Hip Hop Sway" about 20 years DJ Tomekk and MC Kurtis under the label "Boogie Down Berlin" with a video and won the Music recording certification in gold.

In 2013, American R&B singer and songwriter Dawn Richard released the single "Riot" with a Tomekk remix.

=== 2013–present ===
DJ Tomekk renounced all drugs and began campaigning against drug use as a speaker, author and sponsor.

In 2016, he released the single "Lonely" with Dante Thomas and in 2019 the single "Never Give Up" with M.O.P.

In 2020, his autobiography "Ich lebe für hip hop" was published by Random House (Heyne-Verlag) with a foreword by Kurtis Blow.

In 2022, DJ Tomekk produced songs for the soundtrack of the American film "Kobe – The Legend of the 81-Point Game". The documentary looks at the life of Kobe Bryant. The single for the film "Ballin" by DJ Tomekk with Silla and Coolio, who died in September 2022, was released in November 2023.

== Discography ==
=== Albums ===
Year	Album	Chart Positions		
Year	Album	GER	AUT	SWI
2001	Return of Hip Hop	5	49	27
2003	Beat of Life Vol. 1	55	—	—
2005	Numma Eyns	39	67	96
2006	Best of DJ Tomekk	—	—	—
2007	The Next Generation Mixtape	—	—	—
2022	Ehrenkodex			
"—" denotes a record that did not chart or was not released in that territory.

=== Singles ===
Year	Single	Chart Positions			
Year	Single	GER	AUT	SWI	BEL
1999	"1, 2, 3, ... Rhymes Galore" (featuring Grandmaster Flash, Flavor Flav, MC Rene and Afrob)	6	9	34	—
2000	"Ich lebe für Hip Hop" (featuring GZA, Curse, Prodigal Sunn and Stieber Twins)	11	31	17	—
2001	"Return of Hip Hop (Ooh, Ooh)" (featuring KRS-One, Torch and MC Rene)	13	64	22	—
2002	"How You Like That (Ja, Ja, Ja)" (featuring Shaquille O'Neal)	68	—	—	—
2002	"Kimnotyze" (featuring Lil' Kim and Trooper Da Don)	6	31	43	38
2003	"Beat of Life" (featuring Ice-T, Sandra Nasić and Trigga tha Gambler)	12	52	100	—
2003	"Ganxtaville Pt. III" (featuring Kurupt, G-Style and Tatwaffe)	5	30	22	—
2003	"Dankbar" (featuring Trooper Da Don, G-Style, Tatwaffe and Said)	31	56	72	—
2004	"Party" (featuring Lil O)	45	—	—	—
2005	"Jump, Jump" (featuring Fler and G-Hot)	3	17	25	—
2005	"Eey Yo (Eeeeins)" (featuring Das Bo)	64	—	—	—
2022	Ballin featuring Coolio & Silla				
"—" denotes a title that did not chart, or was not released in that territory.

=== Remixes ===
- Afrika Islam
  - Troop (feat. Troopa Da Don)
- Ak'Sent
  - Zingy
- Bintia
  - Saturday Love (Very Rare) (feat. Montell Jordan)
- Brandy
  - The Boy Is Mine (feat. Monica)
- Coolio
  - Ghetto Square Dance
  - I Like Girls
- DJ Noppe
  - Eye Yey (Original-Mix) (feat. Said & Saeed)
- Eve
  - Hot Boyz (Video-Mix) (feat. Missy Elliott, Nas & Q-Tip)
- Four Colourz
  - Abcd
- Fugees
  - Fu-Gee-La
- Guano Apes
  - Dödel Up
- Hemstock & Jennings
  - Nothing But You (feat. Paul van Dyk)
- Jay-Z
  - Anything
- Joy Denalane
  - Can't Stop, Don't Stop
  - Time Heals the Pain
- Lexy & K-Paul
  - Let's Play
- Lil' Kim
  - The Jump Off (Video-Mix)
- Liroy & Prodigal Sunn
  - Prosto Z Polski
- LL Cool J
  - You and Me (Video-Mix)
- Missy Elliott
  - Hot Boyz (Video-Mix) (feat. Nas, Eve & Q-Tip)
- Monica
  - The Boy Is Mine (feat. Brandy)
- Monie Love
  - Slice of the Pie
- Montell Jordan
  - Saturday Love (Very Rare) (feat. Bintia)
- Nas
  - Hot Boyz (Video-Mix) (feat. Missy Elliott, Eve & Q-Tip)
- Nena
  - Leuchtturm
- Paul van Dyk
  - Nothing But You (feat. Hemstock & Jennings)
- Prezident Brown
  - Rough Road (Video-Mix)
- Ray Slijngaard and Marvin D. as VIP Allstars
  - Mamacita
- Q-Tip
  - Hot Boyz (Video-Mix) (feat. Missy Elliott, Nas & Eve)
- Sabrina Setlur
  - Hija (Video-Mix)
- Saeed
  - Eye Yey (Original-Mix) (feat. DJ Noppe & Said)
- Said
  - Eye Yey (Video-Mix) (feat. Vanessa S.)
  - Eye Yey (Original-Mix) (feat. DJ Noppe & Saeed)
- Shaquille O'Neal
  - How You Like That
- Sido
  - Mein Block
- Smoove D.
  - End of the World
- Snap!
  - Ooops Up
- Spezializtz
  - Babsi Flowa
- Trooper Da Don
  - Ride or Die (I Need You) (Vanessa S.)
  - Troop (feat. Afrika Islam)
- Vanessa S.
  - Eye Yey (Video-Mix) (feat. Said)
  - Ride or Die (I Need You) (Trooper Da Don)
- Yana
  - Keep Forgetting

== Awards ==
Juice Awards

- 1999: Category Best Producer

1 Live Krone

- 2000: in Category Best Producer

Bravo Otto

- 2000: Gold in Category HipHop National
- 2002: Silber in Category HipHop National
- 2003: Silber in Category HipHop National

Comet Award

- 2000: Category "Best Newcomer"

Other awards

- 2003: Rap Music Award
- MC Mega Music Award
