= Quadratur des Kreises =

Studio album by Freundeskreis
- Released: February 21, 1997
- Genre: German hip hop
- Label: Four Music
- Producer: Philippe Kayser

Freundeskreis chronology
Quadratur des Kreises (1997)	Esperanto (1999)

Quadratur des Kreises (German for "Squaring the circle") is the debut album by German hip hop group Freundeskreis. It hit #12 in Germany, #34 in Switzerland and #38 in Austria. Three singles were released from the album, the first one being the hit "A-N-N-A", which peaked at #6 in the German charts and reached the top 30 in Austria and Switzerland.

== Track listing ==
No.	Title	Length
1.	"Quadratur des Kreises (Intro)" ("Squaring the circle")	2:43
2.	"Leg dein Ohr auf die Schiene der Geschichte" ("Put your ear on the tracks of history")	5:11
3.	"Lasst Mich Nicht Alleine" ("Don't leave me alone")	3:26
4.	"Enfants Terribles International" (French: "Terrible children international" feat. Déborah)	5:20
5.	"Letzten Sonntag Bei Donato" ("Last sunday at Donato's")	1:24
6.	"A-N-N-A" (feat. Donato Wharton & Davide Petroca)	6:06
7.	"Nachtrag" ("Addendum")	0:37
8.	"Future Mothers"	4:26
9.	"Vorspiel" ("Foreplay")	0:38
10.	"Baby, wenn ich down bin" ("Baby, when I'm down" feat. Theresa J. Burnette)	5:16
11.	"Cross The Tracks" (feat. Donato Wharton)	4:56
12.	"Wenn der Vorhang fällt" ("When the curtain falls" feat. Wasi)	4:15
13.	"Zwischenteil" ("Interlude")	0:58
14.	"Overseas/Übersee" (feat. Afrob)	6:53
15.	"Cassandra & Christina"	0:34
16.	"Telefonterror" ("Telephone terror" feat. Cassandra Steen)	5:45
17.	"Im Land der 1210er" ("In the land of the 1210s")	4:21
18.	"Enfants Terribles" (French: "Terrible children")	5:45
19.	"Easy At Last (Outro)"	0:58

== Singles ==
Year	Title	Chart position		
Year	Title	Germany	Switzerland	Austria
1997	"A-N-N-A"	6	15	27
1997	"Leg dein Ohr auf die Schiene der Geschiche"	—	—	—
1997	"Wenn der Vorhang fällt"	77	—	—

== Certifications ==
Region	Certification	Certified units/sales
Germany (BVMI)	Gold	250,000^{‡}
^{‡} Sales+streaming figures based on certification alone.
