= Massive Töne =

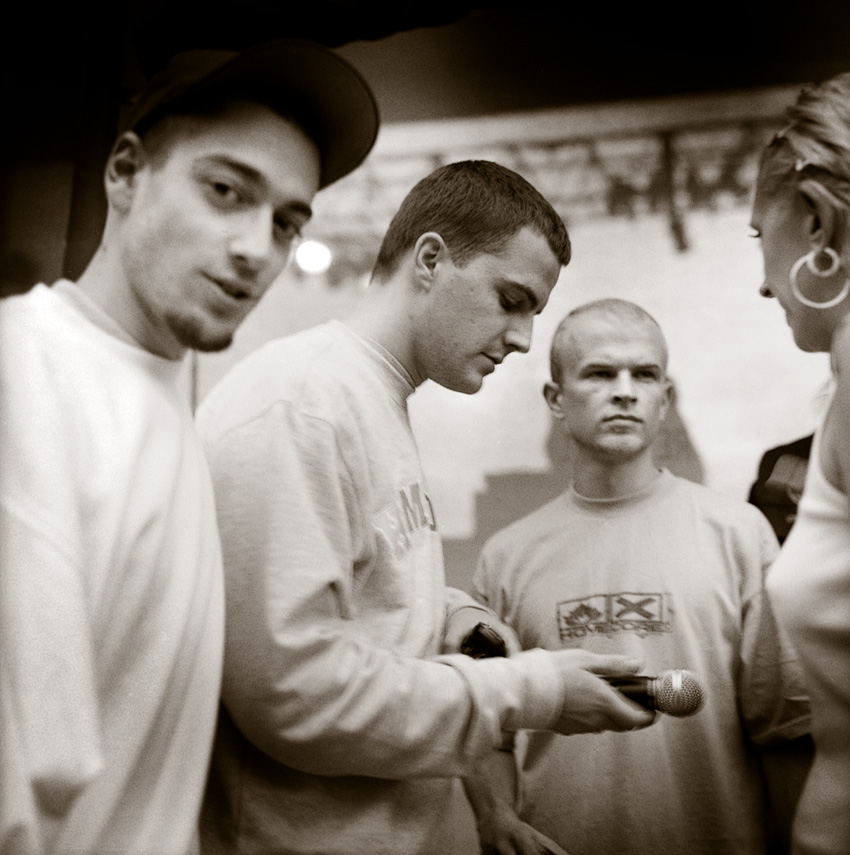
- Massive Töne (2000)

Background information
- Origin: Stuttgart, Germany
- Genres: German hip hop
- Years active: 1991–present
- Members: Ju; Schowi; DJ 5ter Ton
- Past members: Wasi; Flo Schanze (Live drummer)
- Website: www.massivetoene.de

Massive Töne is one of the oldest German hip hop groups, founded 1991 in Stuttgart.

The four founding members, Schowi (Jean-Christoph Ritter), Ju (João dos Santos), Wasi (Wasi Ntuanoglu) and DJ 5ter Ton ("DJ Fifth Note", Alexander Scheffel) all originated in Stuttgart's hip hop scene and modeled themselves at first on the American and French hip hop groups like Breakdance Soundtracks, Beastie Boys, Public Enemy and Ultramagnetics, before they finally found their own style.

In 1993 Massive Töne joined up with other hip-hop musicians, BBoys und Graffiti artists to form the Stuttgarter Kolchose. Along with Massive Töne, the best known members were Afrob, Freundeskreis, DJ Thomilla and Breite Seite.

From 1994 to 1995 Massive Töne appeared at most of the important hip-hop concerts, where they appeared alongside well-known hip-hop groups like Fettes Brot, Spax, Absolute Beginner, the Stieber Twins, and MC Rene.

Massive Töne's debut album Kopfnicker appeared in 1996, making them well known to the entire German hip-hop scene. It remains today as their most important album and as an emblem for the group. In 1998 Massive Töne switched to the major label Eastwest and produced the single Unterschied. The video for Unterschied became an enduring hit in Germany. The 1999 album Überfall brought together highly refined rhythms with strongly expressive lyrics. With well-known performers like Blahzay Blahzay, they collaborated on tracks and produced four singles from Überfall. Another piece, "2Mille", was recorded especially for the French action-comedy film Taxi 2.

After the extraordinary success of the album Überfall, which ended up being one of the best-selling German hip-hops albums ever, the group split in 2000 from their MC/producer, Wasi, and founded their own label, Kopfnicker Records. Kopfnicker Records — das Album was released that same year.

At the turn of the century Massive Töne started to take things slower. It wasn't until 2002 that they released the album MT3, whose single "Cruisen" ("Cruising") reached number 5 in the German charts. The album's 14 tracks are range widely in style, from pure party tracks to socially critical songs like Deutschland, Deutschland.

In 2005 they released their Album Zurück In Die Zukunft ("Back to the Future").

== Discography ==
=== Albums ===
- 1995 - ...Dichter In Stuttgart (EP)
- 1996 - Kopfnicker
- 1999 - Überfall
- 2002 - MT3
- 2005 - Zurück in die Zukunft

=== Singles ===
==== From ...Dichter In Stuttgart ====
- 1995 - "Sie ist in Gefahr"

==== From Kopfnicker ====
- 1996 - "Kopfnicker"

==== From Überfall ====
- 1998 - "Unterschied"
- 1999 - "Rapgame"
- 1999 - "Chartbreaker"

==== From Taxi 2 - OST ====
- 2000 - "2 Mille" (with Skills en Masse)

==== From MT3 ====
- 2002 - "Cruisen"
- 2002 - "Geld Oder Liebe"
- 2003 - "Traumreise"
- 2003 - "Stress"

==== From Zurück in die Zukunft ====
- 2005 - "Bumerang"
- 2005 - "Topmodel"
- 2006 - "Mein Job"

== Music that sounds like Massive Töne ==
- East Coast Avengers
