= Clueso =

German singer, rapper, songwriter, and producer

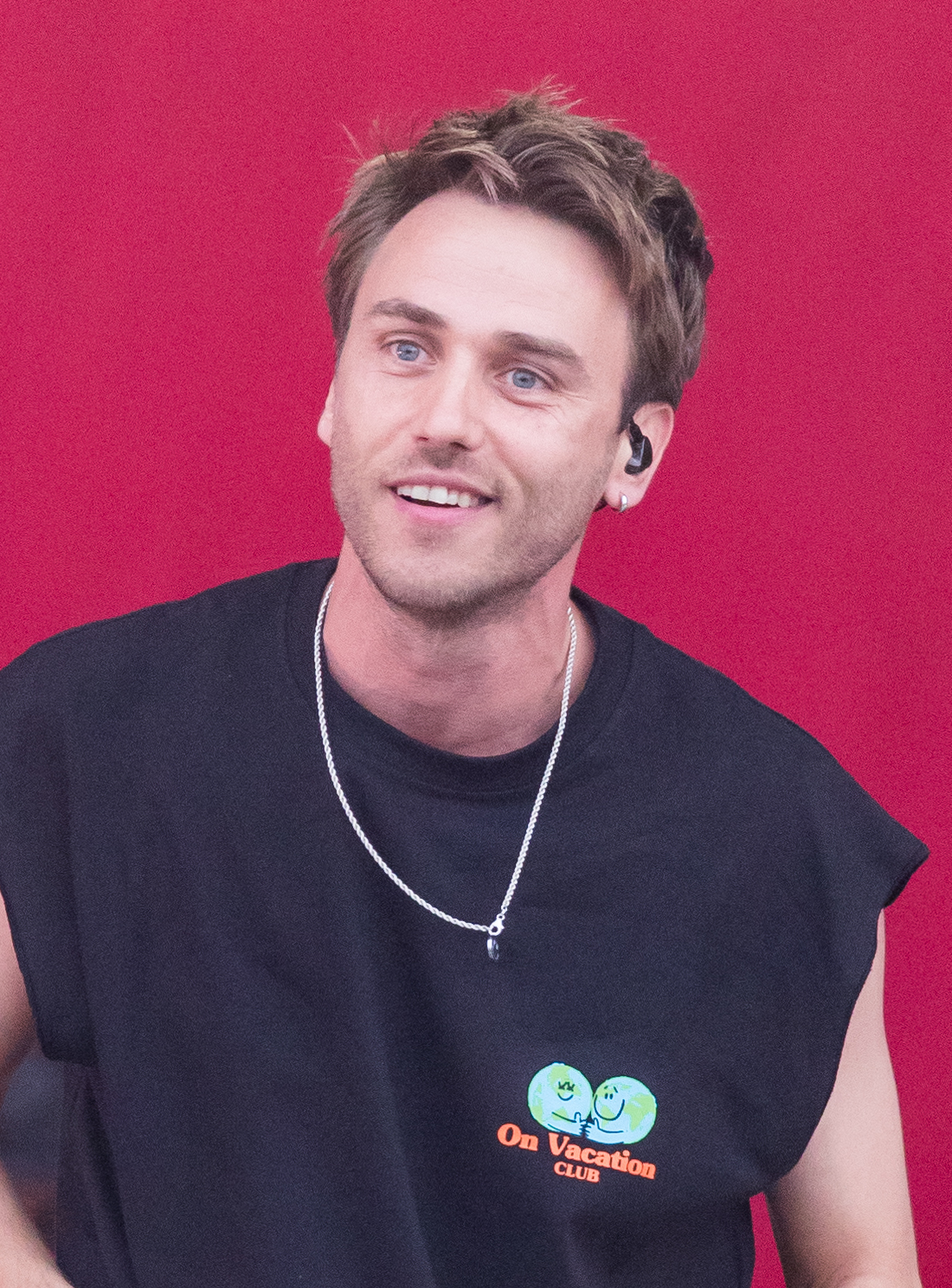
- Clueso in 2023

Background information
- Born: Thomas Hübner; 9 April 1980 (age 45); Erfurt, East Germany
- Genres: Pop; German hip-hop; electronic; reggae
- Occupations: Singer; rapper; songwriter; record producer
- Instruments: Guitar; synthesizer; Vocals
- Years active: 1995–present
- Labels: Four; Sony
- Website: clueso.de

Thomas Hübner (born 9 April 1980), better known by his stage name Clueso (pronounced [klyˈzo]), is a German singer, rapper, songwriter, and producer. His first album, Text und Ton, was released in 2001. Since then, he has released seven more albums, of which the last three—Stadtrandlichter (2014), Neuanfang (2016) and Handgepäck I (2018)—reached number 1 of the German Top 100.

His music is notable for being a mix of hip hop, pop and electronic music, and sometimes reggae.

== Career ==
Born in Erfurt, Clueso—named after Inspector Clouseau in The Pink Panther—started making music in 1995. In 1998, he got to know his future manager Andreas Welskop and gave up his hairdressing apprenticeship. His first vinyl, Clüsolo, was released on BMG Ufa the same year. In 1999, he moved to the 10vor10-Studios in Cologne with Welskop. A year later, he signed a label contract at Four Music and released Text und Ton in 2001. Around that time, he performed with Curfew at the MTV HipHop Open in Stuttgart and at Beats for Life in Cologne.

In 2002, Clueso moved back to Erfurt and recorded the Rowdy-Club-Tape 2002. One year later, he started producing his second album Gute Musik, which translates to "Good Music" (featuring Blumentopf, Steer M, Tilmann Jarmer, Delhia, Tim Neuhaus and Jürgen Kerth), which was finished by 2004. It does not contain any English tracks and concentrates on singing rather than rapping.

In 2005, Clueso represented Thuringia in the Bundesvision Song Contest 2005 with the song "Kein Bock zu gehen", placing seventh with 63 points. The same year, he was the partner of Start Ab, the "biggest non-commercial remix contest in Europe".

On 19 May 2006, his third album, Weit weg, was released. In conjunction with the STÜBAphilharmonie, a Thuringian orchestra, Clueso gave a concert in the Fritz-Club in Berlin on 3 February 2007, where he performed his songs together with the orchestra and his band in an arrangement for more than 70 instruments. This concert was also released on the DVD Clueso Live or Clueso – Weit weg – Live. In May and June 2007, Clueso was the opening act of Herbert Grönemeyer's 12-Tour and in the same year he was nominated by 1 live for the 1 live radio listener's award, the 1LIVE Krone, in the category "Best Live Act".

In September 2007, the single "Lala", a song, which was especially recorded for the movie Leroy, was released. On 14 February 2008, Clueso again represented Thuringia in Stefan Raab's Bundesvision Song Contest. With his song "Keinen Zentimeter", he came second, only one point behind the winner. On 30 May 2008, his fourth album So sehr dabei was released.

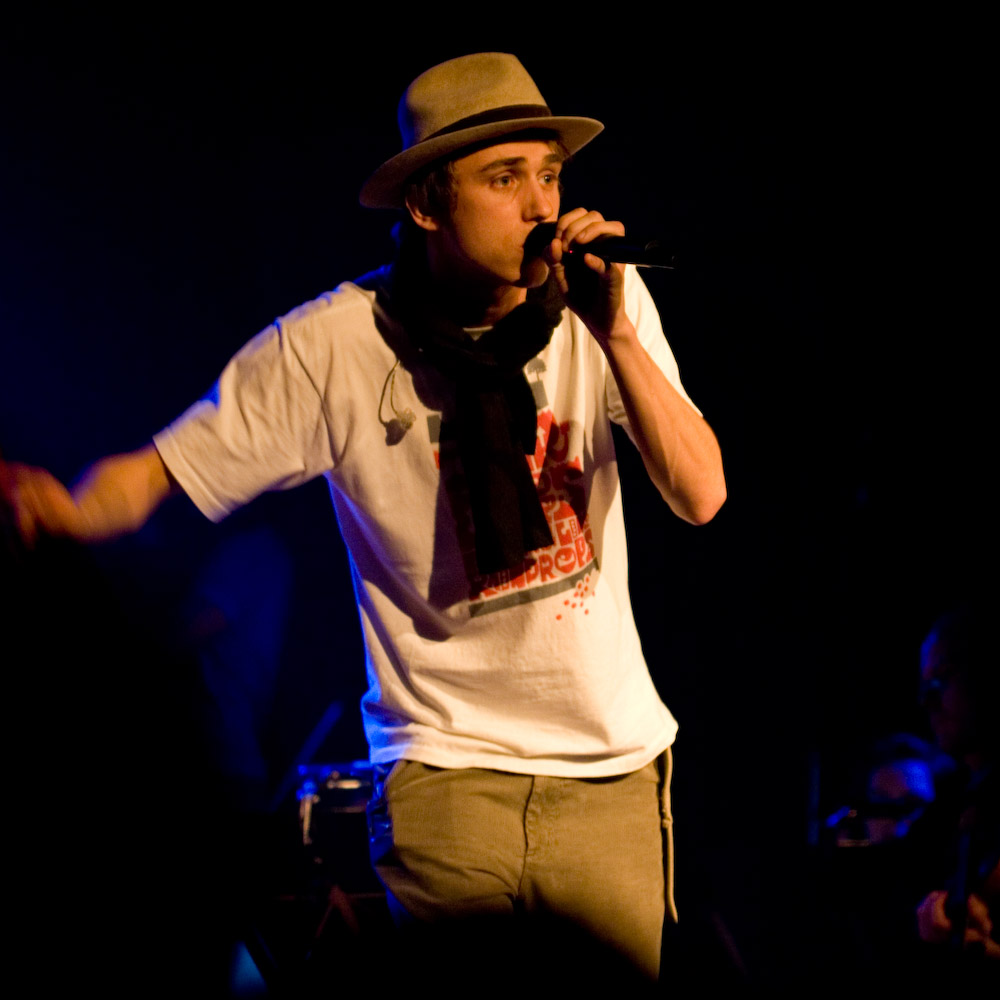
Clueso performing in 2008

In December 2010 Clueso released a book Clueso. Von und über ("Clueso. Made By and About").

The fifth studio album An und für sich ("In and of itself") was released on 25 March 2011. The same year, Clueso collaborated with Udo Lindenberg performing the song "Cello" on the album MTV Unplugged – Live im Hotel Atlantic. The song was also released as a single and reached number 4 in the German charts. After having released number 1 album Stadtrandlichter in 2014, Clueso parted ways with his long-standing band and management team. He wrote his following album about this period of separation and fittingly named it Neuanfang"("New Beginning"). The album reached number 1 of the German charts.

After the release of Neuanfang, he started working on a new album called Handgepäck I ("Hand Luggage I"), a collection of acoustic songs that he has written and collected over the last seven years during several trips and journeys around the world.

== Discography ==
=== Studio albums ===
Title	Album details	Peak positions			Certifications
Title	Album details	GER	AUT	SWI	Certifications
Text und Ton	Released: 30 April 2001; Label: Four Music; Formats: CD, digital download	—	—	—	
Gute Musik	Released: 18 June 2004; Label: Four Music; Formats: CD, digital download	53	—	—	BVMI: Gold
Weit weg	Released: 19 May 2006; Label: Text und Ton, Universal; Formats: CD, digital download	12	—	62	BVMI: Gold
So sehr dabei	Released: 30 May 2008; Label: Text und Ton, Universal; Formats: CD, digital download	3	40	26	BVMI: 3× Gold
An und für sich	Released: 25 March 2011; Label: Text und Ton, Universal; Formats: CD, digital download	2	20	24	BVMI: Platinum
Stadtrandlichter	Released: 19 September 2014; Label: Text und Ton, Universal; Formats: CD, digital download	1	12	6	BVMI: Gold
Neuanfang	Released: 14 October 2016; Label: Vertigo Berlin, Universal; Formats: CD, digital download	1	14	15	BVMI: Gold
Handgepäck I	Released: 24 August 2018; Label: Vertigo Berlin, Universal; Formats: CD, digital download	1	17	12	
Album	Released: 1 October 2021; Label: Epic Records Germany, Sony Music; Formats: CD, digital download	2	12	13	

=== Live albums ===
Title	Album details	Peak positions			Certifications
Title	Album details	GER	AUT	SWI	Certifications
So sehr dabei – Live	Released: 24 April 2009; Label: Text und Ton, Universal; Formats: CD, digital download	—	—	—	
Clueso & STÜBA Philharmonie	Released: 9 July 2010; Label: Text und Ton, Universal; Formats: CD, digital download	11	—	—	
Stadtrandlichter – Live	Released: 13 November 2015; Label: Text und Ton, Universal; Formats: CD, digital download	—	—	—	

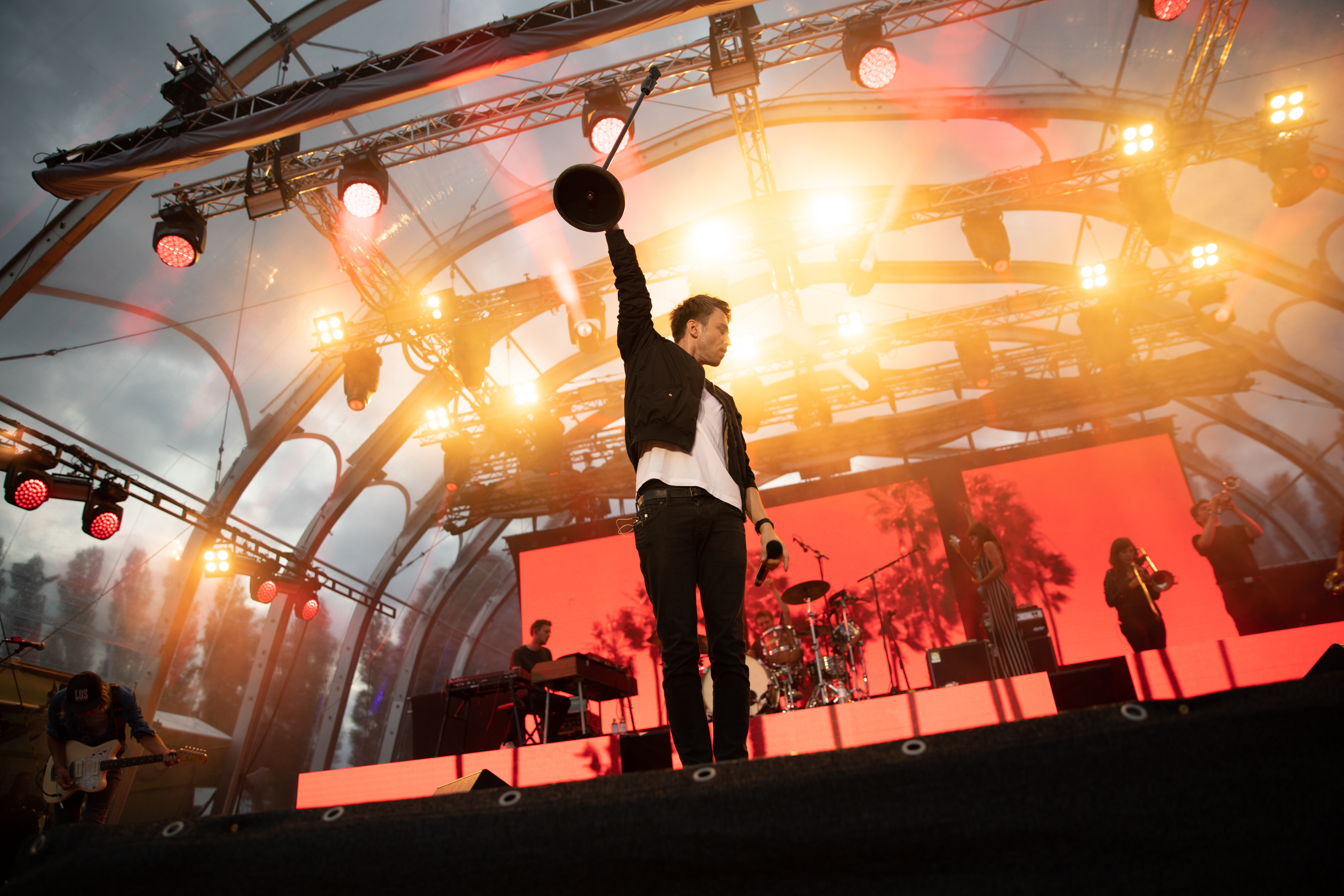
Clueso & Band, 2018

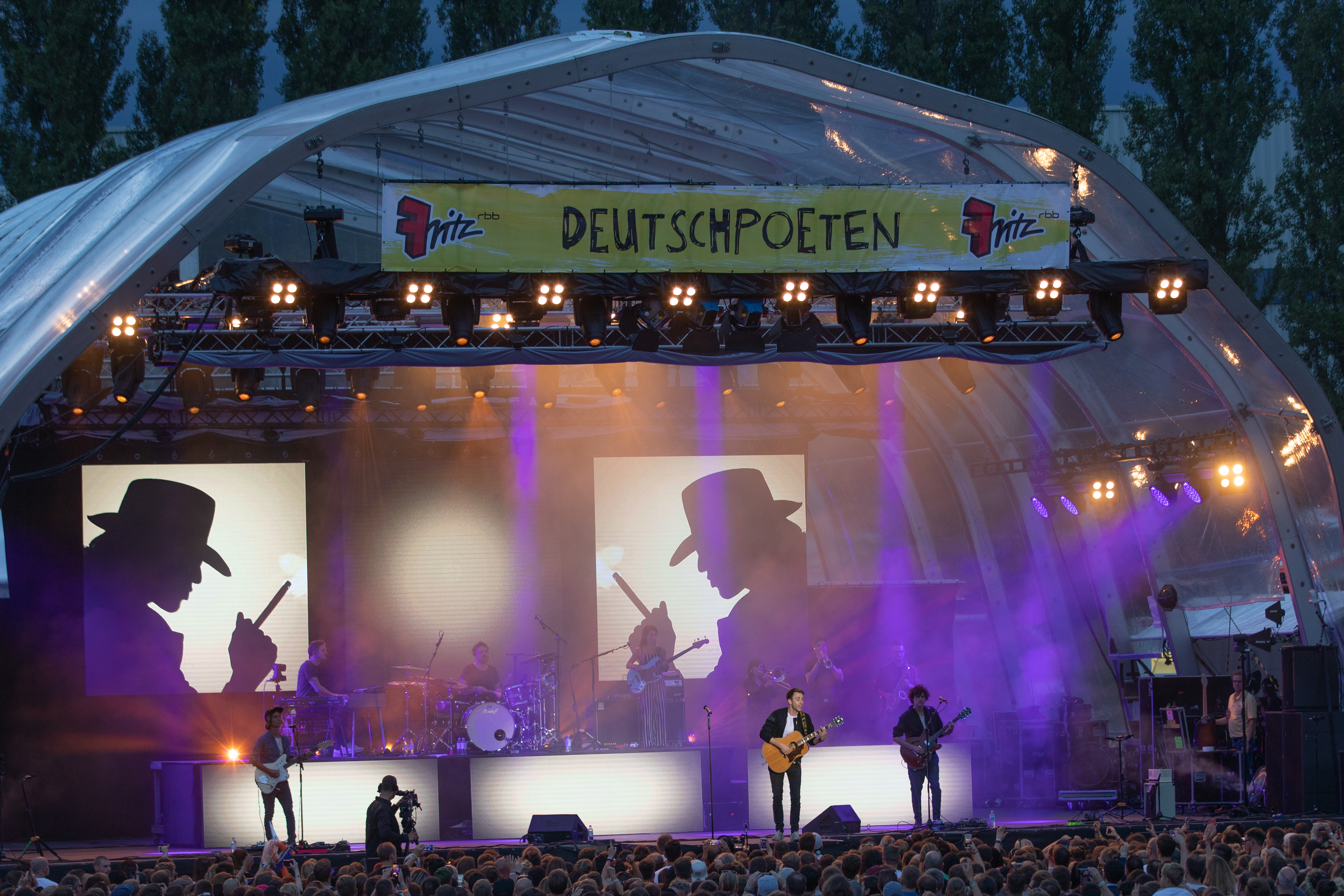
Clueso & Band, 2018

=== Singles ===
- 2000: The Disk feat. Metaphysics
- 2000: Spiel da nich mit ("Don't play along with it")
- 2001: Sag mir wo ("Tell me where")
- 2003: Extended Player EP
- 2004: Wart' mal ("Wait a second")
- 2005: Kein Bock zu geh'n (#65 German Top 100) ("Don't wanna go")
- 2005: Pizzaschachteln ("Pizza boxes")
- 2005: Komm schlaf bei mir ("Clueso Singt Rio Reiser") ("Come, sleep here with me")
- 2006: Chicago (#60 German Top 100)
- 2006: Out of Space
- 2007: Chicago (Live)
- 2007: Lala (for the movie Leroy)
- 2008: Keinen Zentimeter (#15 German Top 100) ("Not an inch")
- 2008: Mitnehm' (#79 German Top 100) ("Take along")
- 2008: Niemand an dich denkt (#83 German Top 100) ("Nobody's thinking about you")
- 2009: Gewinner (#21 German Top 100) ("Winner")
- 2011: Zu schnell vorbei (#38 German Top 100) ("Too Quickly Gone")
- 2011: Du bleibst ("You stay")
- 2011: Beinah ("Almost")
- 2011: Cello Udo Lindenberg feat. Clueso (#4 German Top 100)
- 2014: Stadtrandlichter ("Lights of the Outskirts")
- 2014: Freidrehen ("Freely revolving") (#20 German Top 100)
- 2016: Neuanfang ("New Beginning") (#48 German Top 100)
- 2017: Wenn du liebst Clueso feat. Kat Frankie ("If you love")
- 2017: Achterbahn ("Rollercoaster")
- 2018: Du und ich ("You and Me")
- 2018: Vier Jahreszeiten an einem Tag ("Four Seasons in One Day" – Crowded House Cover)
- 2018: Wie versprochen ("As promised")
- 2020: Sag mir was du willst (Tell me what you want)
- 2020: Tanzen (Dance)
- 2020: Flugmodus (Flight mode)
- 2020: Aber ohne dich (But without you)
- 2020: Du warst immer dabei (You were always there)
- 2021: Leider Berlin (Unfortunately Berlin)
- 2021: Willkommen Zurück Clueso feat. Andreas Bourani (Welcome Back)
- 2021: 37 Grad im Paradies (37 Degrees in Paradise)
