= Curse (rapper) =

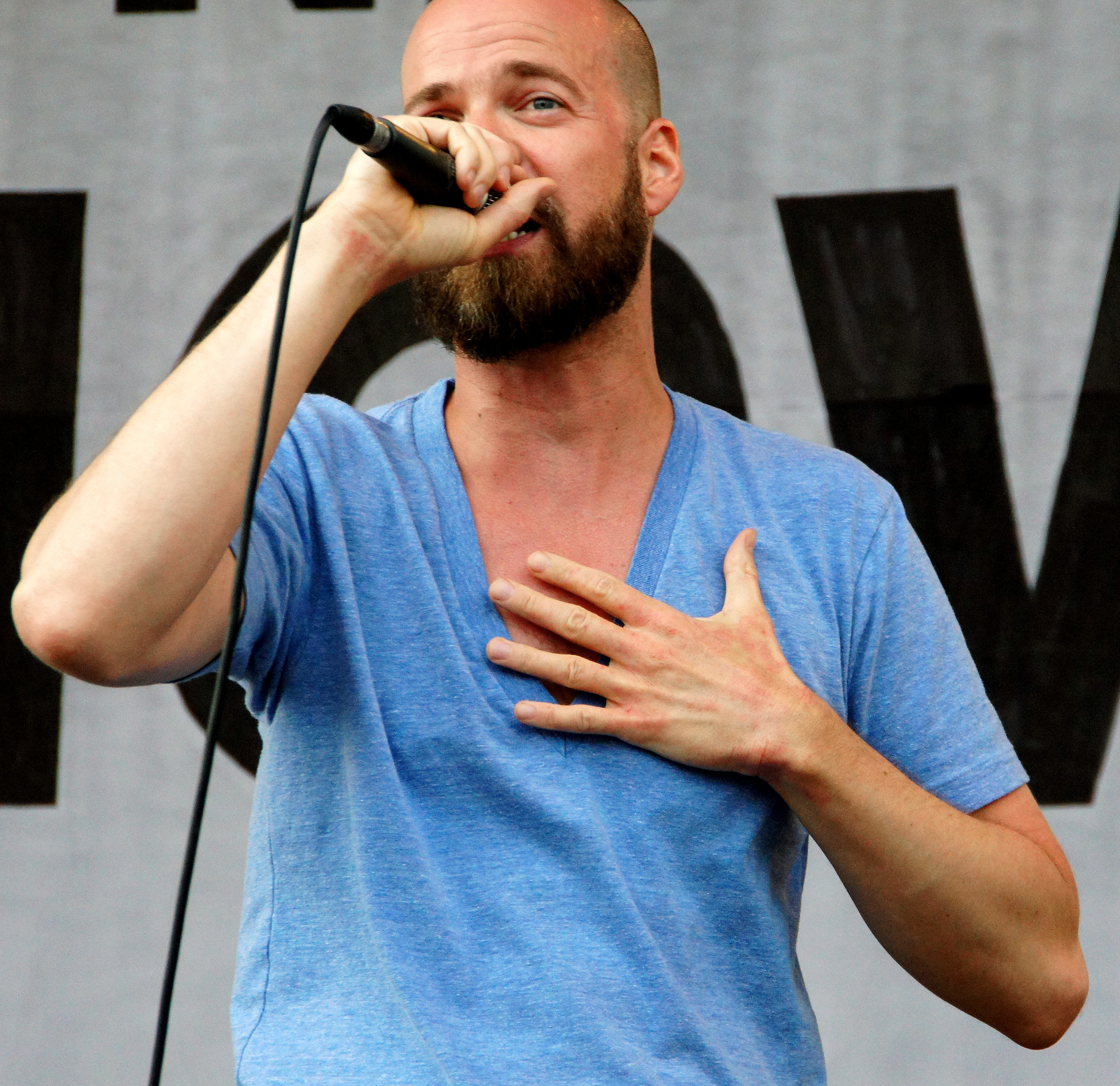
- Curse in 2012

Background information
- Born: Michael Sebastian Kurth; 6 September 1978 (age 48); Minden, Germany
- Genre: Hip hop
- Occupation: Rapper
- Labels: Four Music, Indie Neue Welt
- Website: curse.de

Michael Sebastian Kurth (born 6 September 1978), better known as Curse, is a German rapper.

== Biography ==
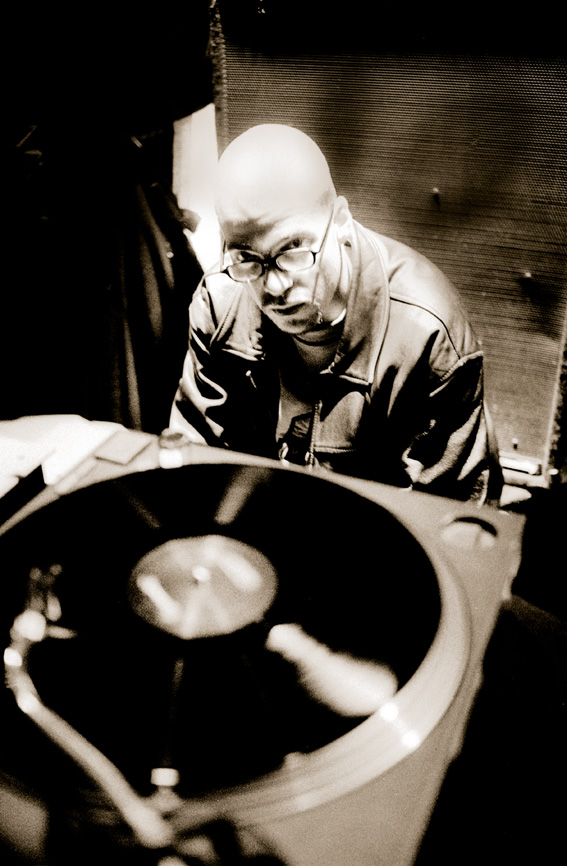
Curse in 1999

Curse has had a long musical past. In his youth, he played songs like "Zwei mal in den Kopf" ("Twice into the Head") in his former band Phat Kicks. In the 1990s, his band had gigs in the area of Stadthagen.

In 2000, he rapped together with GZA, Prodigal Sunn and the Stieber Twins on the single "Ich lebe für Hip Hop" from DJ Tomekk, which was placed on the German charts.

On his first album, Feuerwasser, (released in 2000), his lyrics were self-reflective and dealt with things that had happened in his life, but also contained classical hip hop tracks such as representing- and battle-tracks. He especially raps about abortive relationships and admits mistakes to himself. For that reason, he is something of an outsider in the hip hop scene.

The beats on Feuerwasser and many other releases are often produced by Sascha Bühren, a.k.a. Busy.

In 2001, he released his second album, Von innen nach außen, which literally means "From the Inside to the Outside". On this album, Curse continued his style. The lead single "Lass uns doch Freunde sein" ("Let Us Be Friends") was different from current rap clichés, and thus gained attention outside the hip hop scene. The German hip hop magazine Juice awarded this album with the title "Best National Album". It reached the German top-ten charts and was released in Japan.

On his third album, Innere Sicherheit ("Inner Security"), his style changed in many aspects. While the beats on his previous albums were mainly produced electronically, on this album they are produced with a wide range of instruments. The album covers a broad musical array from sophisticated instrumentals with classical transverse flutes ("Ich versteh dich") via the crossover song "Schocktherapie" to the very emotional "Und was ist jetzt?", a piano ballad, which emphasizes and accompanies the deep lyrics. An increasing amount of political society-critical texts can be detected, although he is not ignoring his 'old' topics. Similarly, the single "Widerstand" originated with the German reggae artist Gentleman.

With the cooperation of up-and-coming talents he acquired renown. So, for instance, he gave Italo Reno & Germany as soon as Stress und Trauma the opportunity to present themselves to a general public with guest appearances on his releases and not least by his artist platform Alles Real Records. Over the years he collaborated with various German and international artists, including Kool Savas, Xavier Naidoo, Max Herre (Freundeskreis), Samy Deluxe, J-Luv, Braz (4Lyn), Patrice, Black Thought (The Roots), Pete Rock and RZA.

On 2 December 2005, Curse released his fourth album Sinnflut. The lead single, "Gangsta Rap", entered the German charts at number No. 25. On Sinnflut, Curse returns to his roots, as if the experimental album Innere Sicherheit had never existed. With deep and very private songs such as "Kein Weg zurück" ("No Way Back") or "Mein Leben" ("My Life"), or the representative tracks like "Der Fluch" ("The Curse") or "Broken Language Reloaded" with the Samy Deluxe Feature (a remake of the classic "Broken Language" from Smooth Da Hustler feat. Trigger Tha Gambler from 1995) the record became homogeneous and multifaceted. Curse fulfilled for himself a childhood dream with the features with Black Thought (of The Roots) and the producer Pete Rock. The latter was persuaded to sing the hooks and shoutouts, which he had done for Nas. He names Nas as his big idol to whom he is often compared as one of Germany's greatest lyricists.

Curse released his new album called Freiheit (Freedom) in 2008. The first single released from the album was a sample of Marius Müller-Westernhagen's song "Freiheit".

On 5 October 2010, Curse announced that he would not continue his rap career. On 4 August 2014, he announced his comeback and on 31 October, a new album, Uns, was released on his new-founded label "Indie Neue Welt". The first single, "Wir brauchen nur uns", was released on 10 October 2014.

== Discography ==
=== Albums ===
- 2000: Feuerwasser (Jive Records) (BMG)
- 2001: Von innen nach außen (Jive Records) (BMG)
- 2003: Innere Sicherheit (Jive Records) (BMG)
- 2005: Prestige: Taz. Greis. Claud. Curse (ARR Suisse)
- 2005: Sinnflut (ARR)
- 2006: Einblick Zurück (best-of mixtape) (ARR)
- 2006: Sinnflut (Japanese edition) (Bad News Records/Miclife Recordings)
- 2008: Freiheit (Alles Real Records)
- 2014: Uns (Indie Neue Welt)
- 2015: Feuerwasser15 (BMG)
- 2018: Die Farbe von Wasser (Indie Neue Welt)
- 2024: Unzerstörbarer Sommer (Indie Neue Welt)

=== Singles/EPs ===
- 1999: Doppeltes Risiko/Kreislauf (vinyl) (Jive Records) (BMG)
- 1999: Sonnenwende/Erfolg (Vinyl) (Jive Records) (BMG)
- 1999: 99 Essenz EP (Jive Records) (BMG)
- 2000: Wahre Liebe (Jive Records) (BMG)
- 2000: Hassliebe (Jive Records) (BMG)
- 2001: Lass uns doch Freunde sein (Jive Records) (BMG)
- 2001: Warum nicht? (Jive Records) (BMG)
- 2003: Hand hoch (Jive Records) (BMG)
- 2003: Widerstand (Jive Records) (BMG)
- 2003: Und was ist jetzt? (Jive Records) (BMG)
- 2005: Gangsta Rap (EP) (Subword) (BMG)
- 2006: Struggle (feat. Samir) (ARR)
- 2006: Rap (recorded in 2003) (ARR)
- 2014: Wir brauchen nur uns (Indie Neue Welt)
- 2015: 99' Essenz EP (BMG)
- 2023: Waffen (AHORN Session, Tailormade)
- 2024: Die Stimme (Indie Neue Welt)
- 2024: Teil 1: Overdrive / Teil 2: Slow Down (Indie Neue Welt)
- 2024: 1994 (Indie Neue Welt)
- 2024: Sonne (Indie Neue Welt)
- 2024: Firmament (with Moses Pelham) (Indie Neue Welt)

=== Miscellaneous ===
- 2001: Nichts wird mehr so sein wie es war (on the occasion of the September 11 attacks)
- 2003: Vom Feinsten (best-of) (Bad News Records/Miclife Recordings)
- 2003: Feuer über Deutschland (free download EP)
- 2003: Von Minden nach Aussen (DVD) (Subword) (BMG)
- 2005: S.I.N.N.F.L.U.T. / Endlich wieder - MZEE.com exclusive (free download track)
- 2005: Wieder da (free download track)

== Awards ==
In 2002, his homepage curse.de was awarded the VIVA Comet in the category "Best Artist Homepage".
