= Ganxtaville Pt. III =

Single by DJ Tomekk featuring Kurupt, Tatwaffe and G-Style

from the album Beat of Life Vol. 1
- Released: 2003
- Genre: Hip hop
- Length: 3:32
- Label: Modul; BMG
- Songwriter(s): Tomasz Kuklicz; Ricardo Brown; Alexander Terboven; Hüsnü Kilic
- Producer(s): DJ Tomekk; Thomas Schmidt

DJ Tomekk singles chronology
"Beat of Life" (2003)	"Ganxtaville Pt. III" (2003)	"Dankbar" (2003)

Music video
- "Ganxtaville" on YouTube

"Ganxtaville Pt. III" is a 2003 single by DJ Tomekk. The song is a follow-up to Ganxtaville Pt. I and 2, both of which originally appeared on the album Beat of Life Vol. 1. The song features Kurupt, G-Style and Tatwaffe. It peaked at No. 5 in Germany. The music video features both an American 1920s and a modern urban gangsta theme.

== Track listing ==
No.	Title	Length
1.	"Ganxtaville Pt. 3" (feat. Kurupt, Tatwaffe and G-Style)	3:32
2.	"Ganxtaville Pt. 2" (feat. Kurupt, Tatwaffe and G-Style)	3:38
3.	"Ganxtaville (Instrumental)"	3:32
4.	"Nice Girls (Schöne Chicken)" (feat. Clumsy & Shegun)	3:04

== Charts ==
=== Weekly charts ===
Chart (2003)	Peak position
Austria (Ö3 Austria Top 40)	30
Germany (GfK)	5
Switzerland (Schweizer Hitparade)	22

=== Year-end charts ===
Chart (2003)	Position
Germany (Official German Charts)	30
