= Ich lebe für Hip Hop =

2000 single by DJ Tomekk

Single by DJ Tomekk featuring GZA, Curse, Prodigal Sunn and Stieber Twins

from the album Return of Hip Hop
- Language: German; English
- Released: 2000
- Genre: Hip hop
- Length: 4:30
- Label: Fila; Modul; BMG
- Songwriter(s): Tomasz Kuklicz; Gary Grice; Michael Kurth; Vergil Ruff; Christian Stieber; Martin Stieber; Tomas Schmidt
- Producer(s): Tomasz Kuklicz; Tomas Schmidt

DJ Tomekk singles chronology
"1, 2, 3, ... Rhymes Galore" (1999)	"Ich lebe für Hip Hop" (2000)	"Return of Hip Hop (Ooh, Ooh)" (2001)

Music video
- "Ich lebe für Hip Hop" on YouTube

"Ich lebe für Hip Hop" ("I Live for Hip Hop") is a single by hip hop producer DJ Tomekk, released in 2000. The song features GZA, Curse, Prodigal Sunn and the Stieber Twins. With the exception of repeating the song's title, Prodigal Sunn and GZA rap in English. Curse and the Stieber twins rap in German. The song peaked at number 11 in Germany.

== Music video ==
The music video shows a car pulling up to a building and GZA emerging from it. As he walks inside the building the song's music begins. DJ Tomekk is seen inside the building performing on turntables to a cheering crowd. GZA walks up to the stage and begins rapping his lyrics. Curse can be seen obtaining a cassette tape from two individuals in the street, which gains the attention of some border police officers. He passes the tape on to somebody else before the officers confront him, and the raps his lyrics at the officers. The tape is couriered from person to person. A car stops and picks Curse up, and the officers return to their vehicle and begin driving off. The tape is eventually handed to a motorcycle rider. Prodigal Sunn is seen on stage rapping near Tomekk and GZA. One of the Stieber Twins raises from the now seated crowd listening to Sunn and also begins rapping. The other Stieber twin is seen with a group graffitiing an old building. The officers pull up and pursue the now fleeing graffiti artists. The motorcycle rider who has the cassette tape picks up the Stieber twin, and rides to the building where DJ Tomekk is performing. The tape is eventually handed to Tomekk, who puts it in his pocket and continues performing.

== Track listing ==
No.	Title	Length
1.	"Ich lebe für Hip Hop (Radio Mix)"	4:30
2.	"Ich lebe für Hip Hop (Stieber Twins Remix)"	4:41
3.	"Ich lebe für Hip Hop (True Busyness Remix)"	3:51
4.	"Ich lebe für Hip Hop (Censored Version)"	4:40
5.	"Ich lebe für Hip Hop (Busy Edit)"	4:40
6.	"Ich lebe für Hip Hop (Instrumental)"	4:15

== Charts ==
=== Weekly charts ===
Chart (2000)	Peak position
Austria (Ö3 Austria Top 40)	31
Germany (GfK)	11
Switzerland (Schweizer Hitparade)	17

=== Year-end charts ===
Chart (2000)	Position
Germany (Official German Charts)	95
