= Feuerwasser =

Studio album by Curse
- Released: March 27, 2000
- Recorded: 1999 at True Busyness Studios in Bad Oeynhausen
- Genre: Hip hop
- Length: 43:37
- Label: Jive Records
- Producer: Sascha "Busy" Bühren, Lord Scan (Der Klan), Iman etc.

Curse chronology
Feuerwasser (2000)	Von Innen Nach Außen (2001)

Feuerwasser is the debut solo album by German rapper Curse.

== Track listing ==
1. "Zehn Rap Gesetze"
2. "Was Ist"
3. "Wahre Liebe"
4. "Leavin' Las Vegas" featuring Der Klan
5. "Ladykiller"
6. "Entwicklungshilfe"
7. "Unter 4 Augen"
8. "Séance" featuring The Arsonists, Shabazz the Disciple and Stieber Twins
9. "Hassliebe"
10. "Kaspaklatsche" featuring Der Klan
11. "Weserwasser"
12. "Auf Uns Ist Verlass" featuring Tone
13. "Licht & Schatten" featuring J-Luv
14. "Schlußstrich"
