= Der Letzte seiner Art =

Studio album by Afrob
- Released: 4 September 2009
- Recorded: 2008–2009
- Genre: Hip-hop
- Label: G-Lette Music
- Producer: DJ Rocky; Terrance; Sholar; Bock auf'n Beat; Sebastian Bazee Wohlgemuth; Almazonly Beats (Minus40 Music) and Montana Beats; Rafik

Afrob chronology
| Hammer (2005) | Der Letzte seiner Art (2009) |

Der Letzte seiner Art is the fourth album by German rapper Afrob, released in September 2009 via his own label G-Lette Music.

== Track listing ==
| # | Title | Producer(s) | Performer(s) |
|---|---|---|---|
| 1 | "Wo sind die Rapper hin?!" | DJ Rocky | Afrob |
| 2 | "Wat is los?" | Terrance | Afrob feat. Lisi |
| 3 | "Was wollt ihr?" | Sholar | Afrob |
| 4 | "Schnelle Nummer" | Bock auf'n Beat | Afrob feat. Brixx & Dean Dawson |
| 5 | "Babygirl" | Sebastian Bazee Wohlgemuth | Afrob feat. DJ Rocky |
| 6 | "So lange her" | Sebastian Bazee Wohlgemuth | Afrob feat. Lisi |
| 7 | "Mein Kampf" | Almazonly Beats (Minus40 Music) & Montana Beats | Afrob |
| 8 | "Sie, ich & sie" | DJ Rocky | Afrob feat. Cassandra Steen |
| 9 | "ASD Comeback" | DJ Rocky | Afrob feat. Samy Deluxe |
| 10 | "Mach mein Ding" | Sebastian Bazee Wohlgemuth | Afrob feat. Camouflow |
| 11 | "Allein" | Bock auf'n Beat | Afrob |
| 12 | "Gief Konjunkturpaket VI" | Bock auf'n Beat | Afrob feat. Sarah |
| 13 | "Du weißt (was ich will)" | Rafik | Afrob feat. Habesha |
| 14 | "I want you" | Bock auf'n Beat | Afrob feat. Jayson Biggz |
| 15 | "Spektakulär 2009" | Sebastian Bazee Wohlgemuth | Afrob |

== Album singles ==
Single information
"Wo sind die Rapper hin?"
- Released: 5 June 2009
"Was wollt ihr?"
- Released: 11 September 2009

== Chart performance ==
| Chart (2009) | Peak position |
|---|---|
| German Albums (Offizielle Top 100) | 70 |
