= Jump, Jump =

2005 single by DJ Tomekk

Single by DJ Tomekk featuring Fler and G-Hot

from the album Numma Eyns
- Released: 2005
- Genre: Hip Hop
- Length: 3:05
- Songwriter(s): Freddie Perren; Berry Gordy; Jermaine Dupri; Alphonso Mizell; Leroy Bonner; Marshall Jones; Marvin Pierce; Ralph Middlebrooks; Walter Morrison; Dennis Lussier; Gregory Webster; Andrew Noland; Norman Bruce Napier

DJ Tomekk singles chronology
| "Party" (2004) | "Jump, Jump" (2005) |

"Jump, Jump" is a 2005 single by DJ Tomekk from the album Numma Eyns. It features Fler and introduces G-Hot. The song peaked at No. 3 in Germany. It samples the song "Jump" by Kris Kross, though with the exception of the words "Jump, Jump" lyrics are in German. It was Tomekk's last single released. The music video features Tomekk parachuting into a club where Fler and G-Hot rap the lyrics of the song.

== Track listing ==
| No. | Title | Length |
|---|---|---|
| 1. | "Jump, Jump (DJ Tomekk Kommt) (Video Version)" | 3:05 |
| 2. | "Jump, Jump (DJ Tomekk Kommt) (Instrumental)" | 2:59 |
| 3. | "Jump, Jump (DJ Tomekk Kommt) (Partybreak)" | 2:55 |
| 4. | "Jump, Jump (DJ Tomekk Kommt) (Raggaton Remix)" | 3:43 |
| 5. | "Jump, Jump (DJ Tomekk Kommt) (Accapella)" | 3:06 |

== Charts ==
| Chart | Peak Position |
|---|---|
| Germany | 3 |
| Austria | 17 |
| Switzerland | 25 |
