= The Godbody LP =

Studio album by Kurupt, Rakim, and Masta Killa
- Released: September 18, 2026
- Genres: East Coast hip-hop; hardcore hip hop
- Length: 53:06
- Label: Team League Entertainment
- Producers: Rakim; Nick Wiz; Nick Price

The Godbody LP is a collaboration studio album by American rappers Kurupt, Rakim, and Masta Killa, released on September 18, 2026.

== Background ==
In June 2026, it was announced that Kurupt, Rakim, and Masta Killa were working on a collaboration album titled The Godbody LP, which contains 15 tracks, produced by Rakim and Nick Wiz. Features include Snoop Dogg, Raekwon, Kokane, Daz Dillinger, Ghostface Killah, Killa Sin, Mac Shawn 100, Jamall Ray, Buckshot, RIM, Trigga tha Gambler, KRS-One, and Kool G Rap. A few days later, it was reported that Eminem and Jay-Z would appear in an interlude track together, making their first collaboration in 25 years.

On June 15, Kurupt announced the title of the album on Instagram.

== Track listing ==
All tracks are produced by Rakim and Nick Wiz, except for track 10, which is produced by Nick Price.

The Godbody LP track listing
No.	Title	Writer(s)	Length
1.	"Goin' Down" (featuring Kokane)	William Michael Griffin Jr.; Ricardo Emmanuel Brown; Jamel Irief; Jerry Buddy Long Jr.	3:33
2.	"DPG-Wu-Tang, Wu-Tang-DPG"	Brown; Irief	3:39
3.	"Rock Ya Body" (featuring Daz Dillinger, Ghostface Killah & Raekwon)	Griffin Jr.; Brown; Irief; Delmar Drew Arnaud; Dennis David Coles; Corey Woods	3:21
4.	"Push the Button"	Brown; Irief	2:35
5.	"Rabbit" (featuring Mac Shawn 100)	Brown; Irief; DeShawn Dawson	3:26
6.	"God Speak (Interlude)" (featuring Eminem and Jay-Z)	Marshall Mathers III; Shawn Corey Carter	1:09
7.	"A Different Kind"	Griffin Jr.	3:03
8.	"Is It Love" (featuring Jamall Ray)	Brown; Irief; Jamall Ray	2:54
9.	"Thelonius" (featuring Buckshot, Rim and Trigga)	Brown; Irief; Kenyatta Blake; Tywone Smith	3:40
10.	"Nights Over Brooklyn"	Irief	3:10
11.	"I'm Good (Remix)"	Griffin Jr.; Brown; Irief	5:15
12.	"Upstate Introspective (Interlude)" (featuring Killa Sin)	Jeryl Grant	0:56
13.	"Still Ill!" (featuring KRS-One & Kool G Rap)	Griffin Jr.; Brown; Irief; Lawrence Parker; Nathaniel Thomas Wilson	4:14
14.	"Nine & Chrome Fiend" (featuring Kokane)	Brown; Long Jr.	4:20
15.	"Rabbit (Remix)" (featuring Snoop Dogg)	Brown; Irief; Calvin Cordozar Broadus Jr.	3:46
16.	"Halleluja (Remix)" (featuring Mic King)	Griffin Jr.; Brown; Irief; Long Jr.; Michael King	4:05
Total length:			53:06

== Charts ==
Chart performance for The Godbody LP
Chart (2026)	Peak position
UK Album Downloads (Official Charts)	69
