= Once Upon a Time in America (album) =

Studio album by Smoothe da Hustler
- Released: March 19, 1996
- Recorded: 1994–1995
- Studio: Nexx Level Studios
- Genre: Hip hop
- Length: 55:36
- Label: Profile
- Producer: Ill Will Fulton (exec.); DR Period; Kenny Gee

Smoothe da Hustler chronology
Once Upon a Time in America (1996)	Violenttimes Day (2008)

Singles from Once Upon a Time in America
- 1. "Broken Language / Hustlin'" Released: December 12, 1995; 2. "Dollar Bill / My Brother My Ace" Released: 1996; 3. "Hustler's Theme / Murdafest" Released: March 5, 1996

Professional ratings
Review scores
Source	Rating
AllMusic	4.5/5 stars
Muzik	4/5 stars
The Source	3.5/5 stars

Once Upon a Time in America is the debut studio album by American rapper Smoothe da Hustler. It was released on March 19, 1996, via Profile Records. It was produced by New York City-based producer DR Period, with the exception of the song "Glocks on Cock", which was produced by Kenny Gee. It features guest appearances from Trigga tha Gambler, Kovon and DV Alias Khrist.

The album was met with positive reviews, but failed to sell well, only making it to 93 on the Billboard 200, while faring better on the Top R&B/Hip-Hop Albums, peaking at 11. The album produced three singles: "Broken Language" b/w "Hustlin'", "Dollar Bill" b/w "My Brother My Ace" and "Hustler's Theme" b/w "Murdafest". "Broken Language" was alleged to be the inspiration behind Heather Headley's 2002 song "He Is". In a 2006 Vibe interview with Bobbito Garcia, Headley noticed the similarities between the two songs. In a 2006 interview, Smoothe da Hustler confirmed that the song's writer and producer asked him for permission to use the cadence for "Broken Language" and there was a remix of "He Is" with Headley, but the song was never officially released.

== Track listing ==
No.	Title	Writer(s)	Length
1.	"Once upon a Time"	Damon Smith; Darryl Pittman	1:38
2.	"Fuck Whatcha Heard" (featuring Trigga tha Gambler)	D. Smith; Tawan Smith; Pittman	5:13
3.	"Dollar Bill" (featuring D.V. Alias Khrist)	D. Smith; Kenneth Scranton; Pittman	5:00
4.	"Glocks on Cock"	D. Smith; Kenny Glanton	3:54
5.	"Broken Language" (featuring Trigga tha Gambler)	D. Smith; T. Smith; Pittman	3:53
6.	"Speak My Peace"	D. Smith; Pittman	0:50
7.	"Neva Die Alone"	D. Smith; Pittman	4:52
8.	"Food for Thoughts"	D. Smith; Pittman	3:37
9.	"Family Conflicts"	D. Smith; Pittman	1:06
10.	"Only Human" (featuring Kovon)	D. Smith; Pittman	4:29
11.	"Hustler's Theme" (featuring Kovon)	D. Smith; Pittman; Curtis Mayfield	5:10
12.	"Murdafest" (featuring Trigga tha Gambler and D.V. Alias Khrist)	D. Smith; Scranton; Pittman	3:57
13.	"Hustlin'"	D. Smith; Pittman	4:24
14.	"My Brother My Ace" (featuring Trigga tha Gambler)	D. Smith; T. Smith; Pittman	3:20
15.	"Dedication" (featuring Kovon)	D. Smith; Pittman; John Harris; Terry Lewis	4:13
Total length:			55:36

Sample credits

- Track 11 contains samples from "Freddie's Dead" by Curtis Mayfield
- Track 15 contains samples from "No One's Gonna Love You" by The S.O.S. Band

== Personnel ==
- Damon Smith – main artist
- Tawan Smith – featured artist (tracks: 2, 5, 12, 14)
- Kenneth "D.V. Alias Khrist" Scranton – featured artist (tracks: 3, 12)
- Dawn Tallman – additional vocals (track 7)
- Kovon – featured artist (tracks: 10, 11, 15)
- Darryl Pittman – producer (tracks: 1–3, 5–15), arranger, mixing, engineering
- Kenny Glanton – producer (track 4)
- William Broady – executive producer
- Randy Battiste – mixing
- D. Noize – engineering
- Low Mid – engineering
- Tony Dawsey – mastering
- Hope Carr – sample clearance
- Carla Leighton – art direction, design
- Daniel Hastings – photography
- Will Montanez – stylist

== Charts ==
Chart (1996)	Peak position
US Billboard 200	93
