= Hammer (album) =

Studio album by Afrob
- Released: 25 February 2005
- Recorded: 2004–2005
- Genre: Hip-hop
- Label: Four Music
- Producer: DJ 5ter Ton; Dash; Jaz-O; Blitz; Needlz; Sebastian "Bazee" Wohlgemuth; DJ Rocky; DJ Desue; B.R. Gunna; Waajeed; Gerrard C. Baker; J-Luv; Bock Auf'n Beat Garde

Afrob chronology
Made in Germany (2001)	Hammer (2005)	Der Letzte seiner Art (2009)

Hammer is the third album by German rapper Afrob, released in February 2005 by Four Music. It was produced by many famous producers like Needlz, Jaz-O and Waajeed.

== Track listing ==
#	Title	Producer(s)	Performer(s)
1	"Intro"	DJ 5ter Ton	Afrob
2	"Wollt ihr wissen..."	Dash	Afrob
3	"Soulmate"	Jaz-O	Afrob feat. Joy Denalane
4	"Geh dazu ab"	Blitz	Afrob
5	"Stopp die Party"	Needlz	Afrob
6	"Nicht mit mir"	Sebastian "Bazee" Wohlgemuth	Afrob feat. Dean Dawson
7	"WAS"	DJ Rocky	Afrob
8	"German & Yardie"	DJ Desue	Afrob feat. Light of da Bushbabees
9	"Ohne uns geht es nicht"	B.R. Gunna	Afrob feat. Samy Deluxe
10	"Es geht hoch"	DJ Desue	Afrob feat. Lisi
11	"Viel zu gut"	B.R. Gunna	Afrob feat. Max Herre
12	"Stossen mit den Jungs an"	Waajeed	Afrob feat. Dean Dawson
13	"Was weiß ich"	Gerrard C. Baker	Afrob
14	"Schaffen ums zu schaffen"	J-Luv	Afrob feat. Dymak & J-Luv
15	"Supastar"	Bock Auf'n Beat Garde	Afrob
16	"Zähl mein Geld"	Needlz	Afrob
17	"Du bist es nicht!"	DJ Rocky	Afrob feat. Lisi

== Album singles ==
Single information
"Wollt ihr wissen..."
- Released: 14 February 2005
"Es geht hoch"
- Released: 29 June 2005
"Zähl mein Geld"
- Released: 16 December 2005
