= 1, 2, 3, ... Rhymes Galore =

Debut single by DJ Tomekk

Single by DJ Tomekk vs. Grandmaster Flash featuring Afrob, Flavor Flav and MC Rene

from the album Return of Hip Hop
- Language: German; English
- Released: 1999
- Genre: Hip hop
- Length: 3:27
- Label: Fila; Modul; BMG
- Songwriter(s): Tomasz Kuklicz; Robert Zemichiel; René El Khazraje; William Drayton; Thomas Schmidt; Robb Boldt
- Producer(s): DJ Tomekk; Thomas Schmidt

DJ Tomekk singles chronology
"1, 2, 3, ... Rhymes Galore" (1999)	"Ich lebe für Hip Hop" (2000)

Music video
- "1, 2, 3, ... Rhymes Galore" on YouTube

"1, 2, 3, ... Rhymes Galore" is a single by DJ Tomekk and Grandmaster Flash, released in 1999. It was Tomekk's debut single. It features raps by Flavor Flav, MC Rene and Afrob. Flavor Flav raps in English and Afrob and MC Rene both rap in German. The song peaked at No. 6 in Germany and No. 9 in Switzerland.

== Music video ==
The music video begins with Afrob being detained by airport security in Berlin for unknown reasons. When he is left alone in an interview room, he makes a phone call. A payphone in New York begins ringing, and DJ Tomekk answers it. Afrob complains that he is stuck at the airport and asks if they can film later. Tomekk insists they start filming immediately instead. The music begins with Tomekk walking to a building, and Afrob can be seen dialing another number. Flavor Flav is seen holding a payphone receiver as he raps the song's first lyrics. Afrob listens to Flav's lyrics before hanging up the phone and rapping his own lyrics in the room he is being held in. Tomekk can be seen performing on turntables on a roof building. Grandmaster Flash is seen also using turntables in the street, as break dancers perform. MC Rene is seen rapping the last verses of the song as he walks through the street. The video ends with footage of a graffiti tag by graphic artist Specter Berlin, who worked doing art direction for Tomekk.

== Track listing ==
No.	Title	Length
1.	"1, 2, 3, ... Rhymes Galore (Radio Mix)"	3:27
2.	"1, 2, 3, ... Rhymes Galore (DJ Desue Remix)"	3:36
3.	"1, 2, 3, ... Rhymes Galore (Bubblez Remix)"	3:21
4.	"1, 2, 3, ... Rhymes Galore (DJ Sepalot Remix)"	3:24
5.	"1, 2, 3, ... Rhymes Galore (Jeep Mix)"	3:29
6.	"1, 2, 3, ... Rhymes Galore (Instrumental Version)"	3:28

== Charts ==
=== Weekly charts ===
Chart (1999)	Peak position
Austria (Ö3 Austria Top 40)	34
Germany (GfK)	6
Switzerland (Schweizer Hitparade)	9

=== Year-end charts ===
Chart (1999)	Position
Germany (Official German Charts)	55
