= Beat of Life Vol. 1 =

Studio album by DJ Tomekk
- Released: 2002
- Genre: Hip hop
- Length: 1:10:10
- Label: Modul; BMG
- Producer: DJ Tomekk; Thomas Schmidt

DJ Tomekk chronology
| Return of Hip Hop (2001) | Beat of Life Vol. 1 (2002) | Numma Eyns (2005) |

Singles from Beat of Life Vol. 1
- 1. "Kimnotyze" Released: 2002; 2. "Beat of Life" Released: 2002

Professional ratings
Review scores
| Source | Rating |
|---|---|
| laut.de | 1/5 stars |

Beat of Life Vol. 1 is the second album by Polish-born German hip hop producer DJ Tomekk. It was released on in late 2002 through Modul/BMG. Produced entirely by Tomekk and Thomas Schmidt, it features guest appearances from German musicians Trooper Da Don, G-Style, MC Spontan, Sandra Nasić, Shadee, Tatwaffe, Clumsy & Shegun, as well as American hip hop acts, such as the Perverted Monks, The Beatnuts, Ice-T, Kurupt, Lil' Kim, Trigga tha Gambler, Fatman Scoop, and Jamaican recording artist Prezident Brown. The album peaked at number 55 in Germany. It was supported by two charted singles: "Kimnotyze" and "Beat of Life".

== Track listing ==
| No. | Title | Writer(s) | Length |
|---|---|---|---|
| 1. | "On the Wheels..." (Intro) | Tomasz Kuklicz; Thomas Schmidt | 0:37 |
| 2. | "Heidi (That Girl...)" (featuring Perverted Monks) | Kuklicz; Schmidt; Aaron Phillip; A. Harper; C. Harper; Russell Ballanger | 3:29 |
| 3. | "Viel Zu Sehen" (featuring Trooper Da Don) | Kuklicz; Schmidt; Toyin Taylor | 3:54 |
| 4. | "Kimnotyze" (featuring Lil' Kim and Trooper Da Don) | Kuklicz; Schmidt; Kimberly Jones; Taylor | 3:29 |
| 5. | "0177-DJ Tomekk" (Skit) | Kuklicz; Schmidt | 2:12 |
| 6. | "Unleash the Lion" (featuring Prezident Brown) | Kuklicz; Schmidt; Fitz Albert Cotterell | 5:05 |
| 7. | "Ganxtaville Pt. 2" (featuring Kurupt, Tatwaffe and G-Style) | Kuklicz; Schmidt; Ricardo Brown; Alexander Terboven | 3:43 |
| 8. | "Beat of Life" (featuring Ice-T, Sandra Nasić and Trigga tha Gambler) | Kuklicz; Schmidt; Tracy Marrow; Sandra Nasić; Tawan Smith | 5:39 |
| 9. | "Rasta Soldier" (featuring Prezident Brown) | Kuklicz; Schmidt; Cotterell | 5:57 |
| 10. | "Russian Roulette" (featuring Afu-Ra) | Kuklicz; Schmidt; Phillip | 3:59 |
| 11. | "Woody" (featuring The Beatnuts) | Kuklicz; Schmidt; Jerry Tineo | 3:40 |
| 12. | "1-800-Slave 4 U" (Skit) | Kuklicz; Schmidt | 1:22 |
| 13. | "Supermadl" (featuring Shadee) | Kuklicz; Schmidt; Igor Kölblinger | 2:37 |
| 14. | "Holdin It Down" (Skit) | Kuklicz; Schmidt | 1:21 |
| 15. | "Du" (featuring MC Spontan) | Kuklicz; Schmidt; Zafer Öztürk | 4:11 |
| 16. | "Beat of Life Radio" (Skit) | Kuklicz; Schmidt | 1:09 |
| 17. | "Nice Girls (Schöne Chicken)" (featuring Clumsy & Shegun) | Kuklicz; Schmidt; Michael Ongeri; George Ogunleye | 3:05 |
| 18. | "Colorado Part 1 (Live From Japan)" (featuring Fatman Scoop) | Kuklicz; Schmidt; Isaac Freeman III | 2:40 |
| 19. | "After the Show" (Skit) | Kuklicz; Schmidt | 1:21 |
| 20. | "How You Like That RMX (Bonus Track)" (featuring Shaquille O'Neal) | Kuklicz; Schmidt; Shaquille O'Neal | 2:45 |
| 21. | "Ganxtaville Pt. 1" (featuring Kurupt) | Kuklicz; Schmidt; Brown | 7:55 |
| Total length: | | | 1:10:10 |

== Personnel ==
- Tomasz "DJ Tomekk" Kuklicz – producer, mixing
- Thomas Kristian Schmidt – producer, mixing
- Hanse Warns – mastering

== Charts ==
| Chart (2002) | Peak position |
|---|---|
| German Albums (Offizielle Top 100) | 55 |
