= Kimnotyze =

2002 single by DJ Tomekk & Lil' Kim

Single by DJ Tomekk featuring Lil' Kim and Trooper Da Don

from the album Beat of Life Vol. 1
- Language: English; German
- Released: 30 September 2002 (Germany, Austria, Switzerland)
- Recorded: 2001
- Genre: Hip hop
- Length: 3:03
- Label: Modul; Sony BMG
- Songwriter(s): Tomasz Kuklicz; Kimberly Jones; Toyin Taylor; Thomas Schmidt
- Producer(s): DJ Tomekk; Thomas Schmidt

DJ Tomekk singles chronology
| "How You Like That (Ja, Ja, Ja)" (2002) | "Kimnotyze" (2002) | "Beat of Life" (2003) |

Lil' Kim singles chronology
| "In the Air Tonite" (2001) | "Kimnotyze" (2002) | "The Jump Off" (2003) |

Music video
- "Kimnotyze" on YouTube

"Kimnotyze" is the lead single of Lil' Kim for record producer DJ Tomekk's second album Beat of Life Vol. 1. It was released in Switzerland, Austria and Germany only. The song was successful, becoming Lil' Kim's third consecutive Top 10 hit in Germany after her number 1 hit "Lady Marmalade" featuring Christina Aguilera, Mýa, Pink and Missy Elliott and her number 3 hit "In the Air Tonite" featuring Phil Collins. She is the only rapper to achieve this in Germany.

The song is mostly in English but also contains German lyrics, notably a rap by Trooper Da Don and Kim's recurring "Gib's mir richtig, ganz egal wo" (Give it to me right, no matter where). The song samples its instrumental beat from Mtume's "Juicy Fruit" and its chorus is a re-interpretation of the hit song "Hypnotize" by Notorious B.I.G. The song also features the title melody of the German version of Sesame Street transposed to minor scale.

== Track listing ==
1. Kimnotyze (Radio/TV Version) – 3:00
2. Kimnotyze (Lil Kim Mix) – 3:03
3. Kimnotyze (Club Mix) – 3:30
4. Kimnotyze (Instrumental) – 3:21
5. Colorado Part. 1 (feat. Fatman Scoop) – 4:33

== Charts ==
=== Weekly charts ===
| Chart (2002) | Peak position |
|---|---|
| Austria (Ö3 Austria Top 40) | 31 |
| Belgium (Ultratop 50 Flanders) | 38 |
| Germany (GfK) | 6 |
| Switzerland (Schweizer Hitparade) | 43 |

=== Year-end charts ===
| Chart (2002) | Position |
|---|---|
| Germany (Official German Charts) | 51 |
