= Smoothe da Hustler =

African-American rapper (born 1975)

Smoothe Da Hustler
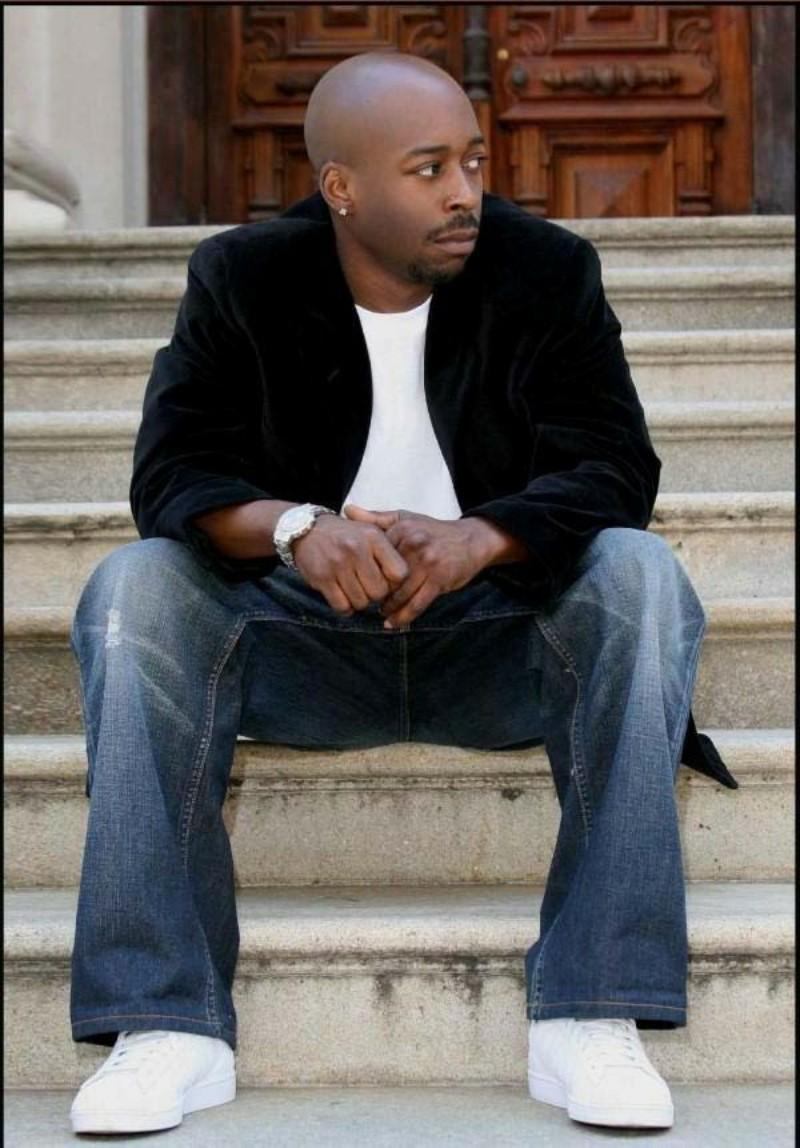

Background information
- Born: Damon Smith; February 8, 1975 (age 51)
- Origin: Brownsville, Brooklyn, New York, U.S.
- Genres: Hip hop
- Occupations: Rapper; record producer; songwriter; record executive; actor
- Years active: 1994–present
- Labels: Profile; SMG Records
- Website: smoothedahustler.com

Damon Smith (born February 8, 1975), known by his stage name Smoothe Da Hustler, is an American rapper, songwriter, record producer, actor, and entrepreneur. He released his debut LP Once Upon a Time in America on Profile Records in 1996. He runs an entertainment company, SMG Entertainment, which includes the record label SMG Records.

== Profile records ==
=== "Broken Language" ===
Smoothe Da Hustler's musical career began when he joined fellow Brooklyn rapper The Notorious B.I.G. on his 1994 Ready to Die promotional tour. The following year, Smoothe Da Hustler teamed up with producer D/R Period to release “Broken Language” independently in his hometown of Brownsville, Brooklyn, NY. The track was a 'Hip Hop Quotable' in the November 1995 issue of The Source and led to a record deal with Profile Records.

=== Once Upon A Time In America ===
Profile Records re-released “Broken Language” on Smoothe Da Hustler's 1996 debut album Once Upon a Time in America. The album peaked at No. 11 and spent four weeks on the Billboard 200. The album's two singles, “Broken Language/Hustlin’” and “Hustler's Theme” spent 24 weeks on the Billboard Top R&B/Hip Hop Albums charts. Billboard described Smoothe Da Hustler as possessing

"a head-spinning, locomotive flow that sounded like nothing else."

== Def Jam Recordings ==
Off the momentum of Once Upon a Time in America, Smoothe Da Hustler was recruited by Def Jam Recordings and wrote for variety of gold- and platinum- certified recording artists, including writing with Rhymefest for Dr. Dre’s legendary unfinished album, Detox.

=== Soundtracks ===
With Def Jam Recordings, Smoothe Da Hustler wrote and recorded "My Crew Can't Go For That" for The Nutty Professor soundtrack, and "Game Face" for Public Enemy's He Got Game album, which became the featured soundtrack for Spike Lee's film of the same name.

== SMG Records ==
=== Repossession: SMG ===
In 2002, Smoothe Da Hustler ended his record deals to create SMG Records in order to retain full authority over his music. SMG Records’ debut album, Repossession: SMG was a no-holds-barred performance by label-mates Ice-T, Trigga tha Gambler, Marc Live (Analog Brothers), and Deuce Fever. Due to high demand, Repossession: SMG turned into a U.S. tour. The tour was recorded for the follow-up live performance DVD, released in conjunction with Penalty Recordings.

=== Violenttimes Day ===
On Valentine's Day 2008, Smoothe Da Hustler released a highly anticipated solo album Violenttimes Day, which included only two featured artists- Trigga tha Gambler and DV Alias Kryst- his long-time writing and recording partners. The 16-track album was received enthusiastically by fans worldwide, leading him to release the follow-up album, Violenttimes Day 2, with SMG Records on Valentine's Day 2012. Due to high-demand, physical copies of the album are no longer available, but Violenttimes Day 2 will be re-released digitally in 2016 with additional tracks not featured on the original pressing.

=== Dem Brooklyn Boys ===
Smoothe Da Hustler is currently writing and producing the soundtrack for Dem Brooklyn Boys, which will be released through SMG Records in conjunction with the film in 2017.

== Notable performances ==
Smoothe Da Hustler has performed alongside Ice-T, Onyx, The Notorious B.I.G., Busta Rhymes, Capone-N-Noreaga, The Lox, Ghostface Killah, KRS-One, Public Enemy, Jeru the Damaja, SWV, Nine, and Special Ed, to name a few. Special notable performances include Jean-Michel Jarre's 50th Anniversary UNESCO Celebration at the Eiffel Tower in Paris, France, which saw 1.25 million people in attendance, the 2002 X Games, which saw 700,000 people in audience, as well as Hot 97's Summer Jam and the Central Park Summerstage in New York City.

== Cultural influence ==
=== Television ===
Broken Language was used by David Simon (The Wire), Ed Burns (The Wire), and David Mills (NYPD Blue, E.R.) for their HBO miniseries The Corner in 2000.

=== Fine arts ===
In 2013, José Parlá staged a critically acclaimed art exhibition entitled "Broken Language" at Haunch of Venison in London, England. He cited Smoothe Da Hustler's "Broken Language" cadence and writing style as the sonic inspiration for his visual art form. "Broken Language" became the title painting, and ultimately, the name of the exhibition and accompanying epitaph. In an interview with Paddle8, Parlá stated:

"The idea of 'Broken Language' as a title for my 2013 exhibition at Haunch of Venison, the gallery's last show as a primary gallery, comes from the song of the same title from 1995 by Smoothe Da Hustler from Brooklyn. His cadence and delivery of rhymes made me think of language made up of styles defined by ethnic backgrounds. For example, English with a Spanish accent, or Jamaican Patois or Creole and so forth. I want to imagine works that visually connect the sound and cadence of language transformed by gesture and surface."

== Discography ==
Year	Title	Chart positions	
Year	Title	U.S. Billboard 200	U.S. R&B
1996	Once Upon a Time in America: Released: March 19, 1996; Label: Profile	93	11
2008	Violenttimes Day: Released: March 28, 2008; Label: SMG Music	—	—
2016	Violenttimes Day 2: Released: February 14, 2016; Label: SMG Music	—	—
2017	Full Time Hustle: Released: March 8, 2017	—	—
