= Trigga tha Gambler =

American rapper

Trigger tha Gambler
- Also known as: Trigga
- Born: Tywone Smith
- Genres: East Coast hip hop
- Occupation: Rapper

Tywone Smith, professionally known by his stage name Trigger tha Gambler (or simply Trigga), is an American East Coast rapper. He is the younger brother of Damon Smith aka Smoothe da Hustler, and first became known for his "aggressive hardcore flow" on his brother's 1995 hit single "Broken Language".

In 1996 Trigga was on No Doubt's roster. In 1999 the brothers were signed to Tommy Boy Records to work on an album Dying To Live.

== Discography ==
With Smoothe da Hustler

- "Broken Language".
- "Fuck Whatcha Heard", "Murdafest" and "My Brother My Ace" from Once Upon a Time in America
- "My Crew Can't Go For That" (also features DV Alias Khrist) from The Nutty Professor Soundtrack
- His 1996 album Life's A 50-50 Gamble was supposed to be released on Def Jam Recordings, but he was dropped from the label, and the album was canceled.
- "Rap Game" from Violenttimes Day

On other artist's recordings

- Shyheim: "What Makes the World Go Round" with Rubbabandz, Trigga tha Gambler, Smoothe da Hustler and DV Alias Khrist (The Lost Generation, 1996)
- Blahzay Blahzay: "Danger, Pt. 2" with Trigga tha Gambler, Darkman and Smoothe da Hustler (Blah Blah Blah, 1996))
- SWV: "'96 Anthem - You're the One (All Star Rap Remix)" with Busta Rhymes, Jay-Z, Mr. Cheeks, Smoothe da Hustler and Trigga tha Gambler (SWV Greatest Hits, 1999)
- DJ Tomekk: "Beat of Life" with Ice-T, Sandra Nasić and Trigga Tha Gambla (Beat of Life Vol. 1, 2003).
- Triple Seis: "Coast 2 Coast" with Ice-T and Trigga Tha Gambler (Only Time'll Tell, 2004)
- Rakim, Kurupt & Masta Killa: "Thelonius" with Buckshot and Rim & Trigga tha Gambler (The Godbody LP, 2026)
