= Beat of Life =

2003 single by DJ Tomekk, Ice-T, Sandra Nasic & Trigga Tha Gambla

Single by DJ Tomekk featuring Ice-T, Sandra Nasić and Trigga tha Gambler

from the album Beat of Life Vol. 1
- Released: 2003
- Recorded: 2002
- Genre: Rap rock
- Length: 4:12
- Label: Modul
- Composers: DJ Tomekk; Thomas Schmidt
- Lyricists: Tracy Marrow; Sandra Nasić; Tawan Smith; Tomasz Kuklicz
- Producer: DJ Tomekk

DJ Tomekk singles chronology
| "Kimnotyze" (2002) | "Beat of Life" (2003) | "Ganxtaville Pt. III" (2003) |

Ice-T singles chronology
| "Get On Down" (2003) | "Beat of Life" (2003) | "Walking in the Rain" (2006) |

Music video
- "Beat Of Life" on YouTube

"Beat of Life" is a 2003 single by DJ Tomekk from his second album Beat of Life Vol. 1. It features guest vocal appearances from American rappers Ice-T and Trigga tha Gambler, as well as Guano Apes vocalist Sandra Nasić. The song peaked at No. 12 in Germany.

== Music video ==
A music video was created for the song. It begins with DJ Tomekk, Ice-T, Trigga tha Gambler and Coco Austin in a car waiting for somebody. Trigga complains about why the person is taking so long to arrive, leading to an argument between him and Ice-T which is only stopped when the man they are waiting for approaches the car. The man starts giving cash to Ice-T, who complains that it is not enough. Sirens appear in the background, leading to an argument between Ice-T and the man outside the car. Ice-T grabs the man by the collar and pulls him against the car as police cars arrives. Police officers grab the man outside the car and Ice-T speeds off, knocking over barrels and getting shot at by police as the car leaves. The music for the song begins, along with brief footage of a high speed chase. Ice-T can next be seen rapping at a streetball match, where DJ Tomekk can be seen performing on turntables. Trigga raps his verses at the event, whilst SWAT agents climb a staircase. The SWAT agents confront Sandra Nasić, who sings her lyrics as the laser sights from their weapons shine on her body. At one point Ice-T completely exposes Coco Austin's breasts whilst he is rapping; the footage was usually censored though uncensored copies exist. DJ Tomekk struggles with two police officers who are trying to apprehend him, before he smashes one of their heads through a window. The video ends with the camera zooming in on Trigga, Coco, Ice-T, DJ Tomekk and several others standing silently.

== Track listing ==
| No. | Title | Length |
|---|---|---|
| 1. | "Beat of Life (Radio Version)" | 4:12 |
| 2. | "Beat of Life (Video Version)" | 5:24 |
| 3. | "Beat of Life (Original Rock Cock Mix)" | 4:07 |
| 4. | "Viel Zu Sehen" (featuring Trooper Da Don) | 3:35 |
| 5. | "Kimnotyze (Party Break)" | 2:30 |

== Charts ==
| Chart (2003) | Peak position |
|---|---|
| Austria (Ö3 Austria Top 40) | 52 |
| Germany (GfK) | 12 |
| Switzerland (Schweizer Hitparade) | 100 |
