= Return of Hip Hop (Ooh, Ooh) =

Single by DJ Tomekk featuring KRS-One, Torch and MC Rene

from the album Return of Hip Hop
- Language: German; English
- Released: 2001
- Genre: Hip hop
- Length: 3:39
- Label: Fila; Modul; BMG
- Songwriter(s): Tomasz Kuklicz; Lawrence Parker; Frederik Hahn; René El Khazraje; Thomas Schmidt
- Producer(s): DJ Tomekk; Thomas Schmidt

DJ Tomekk singles chronology
"Ich lebe für Hip Hop" (2000)	"Return of Hip Hop (Ooh, Ooh)" (2001)	"How You Like That (Ja, Ja, Ja)" (2002)

KRS-One singles chronology
"5 Boroughs" (1998)	"Return of Hip Hop (Ooh, Ooh)" (2001)	"The Mind" (2001)

Music video
- "Return of Hip Hop" on YouTube

"Return of Hip Hop (Ooh, Ooh)" is a 2001 single by DJ Tomekk from his debut album Return of Hip Hop. The song features KRS-One, Torch and MC Rene. KRS-One raps in English, Torch and MC Rene rap in German. The song peaked at No. 13 in Germany.

== Music video ==
The music video credits DJ Tomekk starring as 'Doctor Love', KRS-One starring as an ambulance driver, Torch as a paramedic and MC Rene as a homeless man. KRS-One raps as he is driving the ambulance, and Torch raps whilst in the back of the ambulance as he stands over a patient with defibrillator paddles. Tomekk is seen dressed as a surgeon performing on turntables in an operating room. MC Rene raps whilst pushing a shopping cart full or garbage, whilst Torch and KRS-One are seen taking their patient to Tomekk. MC Rene follows Torch and KRS-One into the operating room, where it is implied that Tomekk saves the patients life.

== Track listing ==
No.	Title	Length
1.	"Return of Hip Hop (Ooh, Ooh) (Radio Version)"	3:29
2.	"Return of Hip Hop (Ooh, Ooh) (Instrumental)"	3:29
3.	"Return of Hip Hop (Ooh, Ooh) (A Cappella)"	3:00
4.	"Return of Hip Hop (Ooh, Ooh) (Boulevard Bou Remix)"	3:52
5.	"Return of Hip Hop (Ooh, Ooh) (Full Clip LP Mix)"	7:00

== Charts ==
Chart (2001)	Peak position
Austria (Ö3 Austria Top 40)	64
Germany (GfK)	13
Switzerland (Schweizer Hitparade)	22
