= Afrob =

German rapper and actor (born 1977)

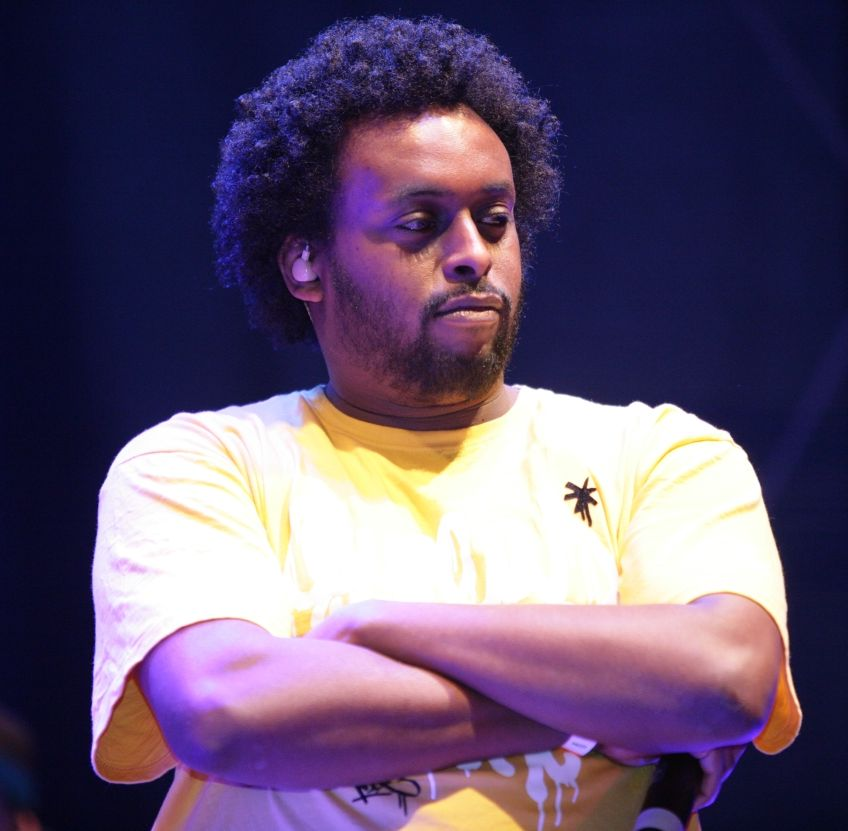
- Afrob in 2007

Background information
- Born: Robert Zemichiel; 1 August 1977 (age 48); Venice, Italy
- Origin: Germany
- Genres: Hip hop
- Occupations: Rapper; actor
- Years active: 1994–present
- Labels: Four Music, G-Lette, One Shotta
- Website: afrob.com

Robert Zemichiel (born 1 August 1977), known professionally as Afrob, is a German rapper and actor. He was born in Venice, Italy but grew up in Stuttgart, Germany. He began rapping in 1994, and has released nine albums since: Rolle mit Hip Hop (1999), Made in Germany (2001), Wer hätte das gedacht? (2003), Hammer (2005), Der Letzte seiner Art (2009), Push (2014), Blockbasta (2015), Mutterschiff (2016), and most recently Abschied von Gestern (2019).

In addition to rapping, Afrob has also appeared in two movies as part of the cast: namely Leroy (2007) and Kopf oder Zahl (2009).

== Biography ==
Afrob was born in Venice, Italy to Eritrean parents but moved to Germany at a young age. He grew up in the German city of Stuttgart, which is where he started his rap career. In 1994, Afrob began his rap career as a featured artist for befriended rap crews such as the Massive Töne, Freundeskreis (FK), and the Spezializtz. Afrob's also gained early fame from his collaboration with Stuttgart Posses such as "Die Kolchose" and "FK Allstars" (et al. with Max Herre, Joy Denalane, Gentleman, and Sékou).

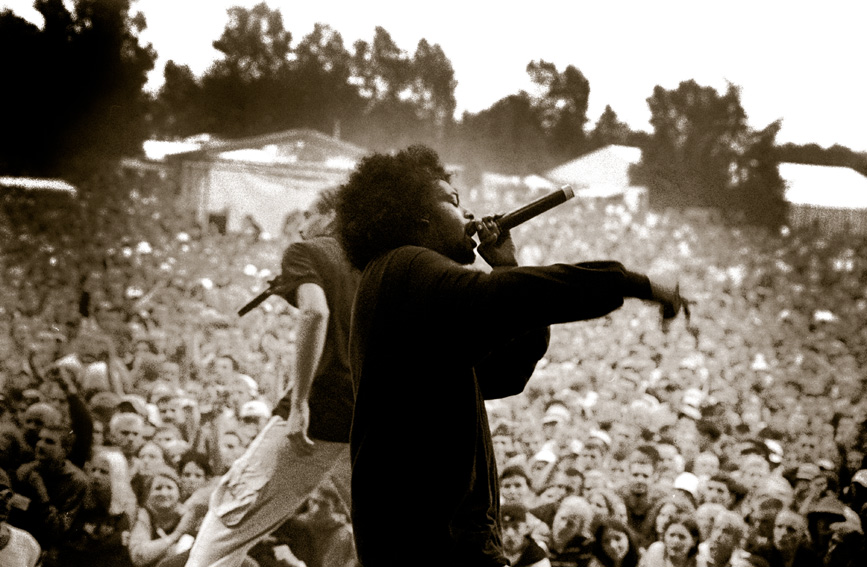
Afrob and Dean in Splash-Festival (2000)

It was not until 1999 that he released his first solo album, Rolle mit Hip Hop. Rolle mit Hip Hop was distributed by Four Music and featured collaborations with the Kolchose, and the album peaked at spot 13 on the German album charts. The same year, Afrob released the single "Reimemonster" ("rhyme monsters") which featured Hamburg City rapper Ferris MC. For this single, Afrob worked together primarily with musicians from Stuttgart (e.g. Wasi, DJ Friction, and Max Herre). Today, "Reimemonster" is still widely regarded as a German hip hop classic. In May 1999, Afrob arranged a tour with Freundeskreis, and in the fall of 1999, he toured with the Fantastischen Vier throughout Germany. At the end of 1999, together with Flavor Flav from Public Enemy and MC Rene, he rapped the song "1, 2, 3, ... Rhymes Galore" on the single by DJ Tomekk and Grandmaster Flash, which placed sixth in the German charts.

His second album, Made in Germany, was released in 2001 by Four Music. The album was less successful, despite featuring acts like Gentleman, Wasi from Massive Töne, Max Herre, and Joy Denalane, and it peaked at spot 79 on the German album charts. This album was more pensive than the first, however, and was interesting due to its social criticism, epitomized by the release of the anti-racist single "Öffne die Augen" ("Open Your Eyes") with Frankfurt's D-Flame. Afrob's engagement with German racism continued with his participation in the Brothers Keepers project, collaborating with an all-star cast of Afro-German musicians in the single "Adriano".

The Brothers Keepers project also marked the first collaboration with Samy Deluxe. They met again when they worked on the single "Four Fists". They subsequently formed a group called ASD (Afrob und Samy Deluxe) and recorded an entire album together. The product of this cooperation was called Wer hätte das gedacht? ("Who Would Have Thought?"), which hit the stores in 2003. Today, Wer hätte das gedacht? remains Afrob's most successful album, having reached fifth place in the German charts.

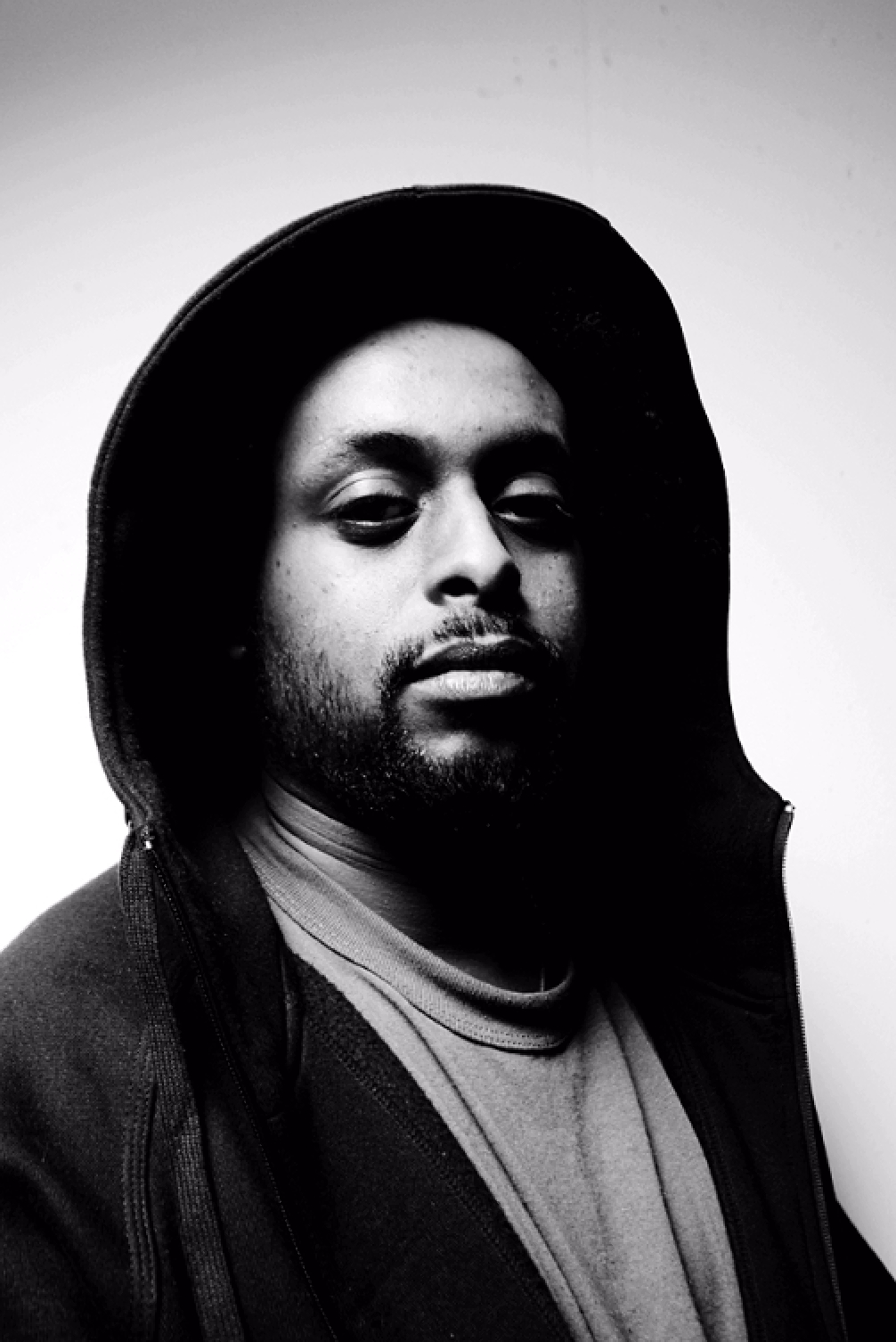
Afrob in 2005

After the success of ASD, Afrob released his third solo album in 2005. The album, named Hammer, was produced by the American producers Needlz, Waajeed, and B.R. Gunna and released on 28 February 2005 by Four Music. The Album was not as successful as Wer hätte das gedacht?, and it peaked at number 38 of the German charts.

In 2006, Afrob collaborated in the solo album of the German rapper Lisi, Eine wie keine ("One of a Kind"). In the following year of 2007, Afrob made his acting debut in the comedy Leroy. Later, he appeared in the 2009 gangster film Kopf oder Zahl.

In 2008, Afrob and rapper Brixx produced the title song for the RTL-Series Alarm für Cobra 11 – Die Autobahnpolizei. In the same year, Afrob left the label Four Music and founded his own label named "G-Lette Music". Lastly, Afrob began work on his album Der Letzte seiner Art in 2008, which was finally released in the September 2009. Der Letzte seiner Art reached a peak at spot 70 on the German album charts.

After a four year creative break, Afrob appeared in the German rapper Sido's 2013 song, 30-11-80. Next, Afrob's fifth solo album Push debuted on 30 May 2014. Push came as a bigger success compared to Afrob's previous albums, Hammer and Der Letzte seiner Art. Push peaked at spot 20 of the German album charts.

On 3 July 2015, Afrob and Samy Deluxe released their second ASD album Blockbasta, which peaked at number five on the German album charts. On 23 September 2016 Afrob released his sixth solo album Mutterschiff, and in 2017, he released his seventh solo album Beats, Rhymes & Mr. Scardanelli.

His most recent and potentially final album Abschied von Gestern (Goodbye to Yesterday) was released in 2019. In this album, Afrob discusses topics such as his relationship with rap and the hip hop community. Furthermore, the song "Flüchtling4Life" ("Refugee4Life") addresses the xenophobia and racism Afrob has experienced in Germany.

Afrob is active on social media, maintaining a Facebook page, Instagram account, and a Twitter account among other forms of social media. On 21 April 2020, Afrob streamed a showcase on Facebook Live with DJ Derezon to raise donations for Stuttgart artists who were impacted by the COVID-19 pandemic.

Afrob is a long-time fan of football club VfB Stuttgart.

== Discography ==
=== Albums ===
- 1999: Rolle mit Hip Hop
- 2001: Made in Germany
- 2003: Wer hätte das gedacht? (with Samy Deluxe as ASD)
- 2005: Hammer
- 2009: Der Letzte seiner Art
- 2014: Push
- 2015: Blockbasta (with Samy Deluxe as ASD)
- 2016: Mutterschiff
- 2019: Abschied von Gestern
- 2023: König ohne Land

=== Singles ===
- 1999: Reimemonster (featuring Ferris MC)
- 1999: Einfach (featuring Meli)
- 2000: Get Up (DJ Thomilla featuring Afrob)
- 2001: Made in Germany
- 2001: Öffne die Augen (featuring D-Flame)
- 2003: Sneak Preview (with Samy Deluxe as ASD)
- 2003: From Street to the Crowd (featuring Street-Igor-X)
- 2003: Sag mir wo die Party ist! (with Samy Deluxe as ASD)
- 2003: Hey du (Nimm dir Zeit) (with Samy Deluxe as ASD)
- 2005: Wollt ihr wissen...
- 2005: Es geht hoch (featuring Lisi)
- 2005: Zähl mein Geld
- 2006: Müde (featuring Lisi)
- 2007: Flashback (featuring Emory)
- 2009: Wo sind die Rapper hin?
- 2009: Was wollt ihr?
- 2014: Immer weiter
- 2014: Afrob kommt
- 2014: Abriss (feat. Megaloh)
- 2014: R.I.P. (feat. Megaloh)
- 2016: Ich bin dieser
- 2019: Stadtmensch
- 2019: Stein auf Stein (feat. Haze)
- 2019: U.N.I.T.Y. 2020 (feat. Alex Prince)
- 2023: One Shotta Boy
- 2023: Vendetta

== Filmography ==
- 2007: Leroy
- 2009: Kopf oder Zahl
