= Numma Eyns =

Studio album by DJ Tomekk
- Released: 16 September 2005
- Genre: Hip hop
- Length: 1:14:23
- Label: EMI
- Producer: DJ Tomekk; Thomas Schmidt; Mr. Hunter; Bora Kalderim

DJ Tomekk chronology
Beat of Life Vol. 1 (2003)	Numma Eyns (2005)	Ehrenkodex (2010)

Singles from Numma Eyns
- 1. "Salem Aleikum" Released: 10 May 2004; 2. "Jump, Jump" Released: 4 July 2005; 3. "Eey Yo (Eeeeins)" Released: 30 September 2005

Professional ratings
Review scores
Source	Rating
laut.de	1/5 stars

Numma Eyns (from German 'Nummer Eins' to English: 'Number One') is the third album by Polish-born German hip hop producer DJ Tomekk. It was released on 16 September 2005 through EMI. Produced by Tomekk, Thomas Schmidt, Mr. Hunter and Bora Kalderim, it features guest appearances from German rappers, such as Harris, Sido, B-Tight and Fler, as well as American musicians, including Khia, Truth Hurts, Blaque, Horace Brown, MC Lyte and Xzibit. The album peaked at number 39 in Germany, number 67 in Austria and number 96 in Switzerland and. It was supported by singles "Salem Aleikum", "Jump, Jump" and "Eey Yo (Eeeeins)" with the latter two were charted.

== Track listing ==
No.	Title	Writer(s)	Producer(s)	Length
1.	"Boogie Down Berlin (Here We Go Again)" (performed by Truth Hurts)	David Blake; Stephen Garrett; William Griffin, Jr.		1:45
2.	"T.O.M.E.K.K." (featuring Queen's Finest, Pain, Trooper Da Don and STS)	Queen's Finest; Pain; Toyin Taylor; S.T.S.; Tomasz Kuklicz; Mr. Hunter	DJ Tomekk; Mr. Hunter	5:50
3.	"Salam Alajkum (Boogie Down Berlin)" (featuring Xzibit, Sido and Harris)	Alvin Joyner; Paul Würdig; Oliver Harris; Kuklicz; Thomas Schmidt	DJ Tomekk; Thomas Schmidt	3:31
4.	"Jump, Jump (DJ Tomekk kommt)" (featuring Fler and G-Hot)	Freddie Perren; Berry Gordy; Jermaine Dupri; Alphonso Mizell; Leroy Bonner; Marshall Jones; Marvin Pierce; Ralph Middlebrooks; Walter Morrison; Dennis Lussier; Gregory Webster; Andrew Noland; Norman Bruce Napier	DJ Tomekk; Thomas Schmidt; Mr. Hunter	3:05
5.	"Da hinten, da hinten" (featuring Nore and B-Tight)	Nore; Robert Edward Davis; Kuklicz; Mr. Hunter	DJ Tomekk; Mr. Hunter	3:50
6.	"Partyverlauf" (featuring MC Lyte, Mike K. Downing, Icebear and Siamak)	Lana Moorer; Icebear; Siamak; Kuklicz; Schmidt; Mike Gruszin	DJ Tomekk; Thomas Schmidt; Mike Gruszin	4:07
7.	"Eey Yo (Eyns)" (featuring Das Bo)	Mirko Bogojević; Kuklicz; Schmidt; Mr. Hunter; Bora Kalderim	DJ Tomekk; Thomas Schmidt; Mr. Hunter; Bora Kalderim	3:01
8.	"Schaatzee" (featuring Blaque and Horace Brown)	Natina Reed; Milton McGhee; Kuklicz; Schmidt; Mr. Hunter	DJ Tomekk; Thomas Schmidt; Mr. Hunter	3:30
9.	"Badesong" (featuring Khia and Sido)	Khia Shamone Finch; Würdig; Kuklicz; Schmidt	DJ Tomekk; Thomas Schmidt	4:34
10.	"Imm Club" (featuring Khia, Mega D, G-Style and Pain)	Mem-Brain; G-Style; Pain; Kuklicz; Schmidt	DJ Tomekk; Thomas Schmidt	3:42
11.	"Jamila" (featuring Said and Harris)	Said Ahmed; Harris; Kuklicz; Schmidt; Taylor	DJ Tomekk; Thomas Schmidt	5:21
12.	"It's a Rap (This Time)" (featuring Truth Hurts and Harris)	Shari Watson; Harris; Kuklicz; Schmidt; Mr. Hunter	DJ Tomekk; Thomas Schmidt; Mr. Hunter	3:40
13.	"Wherever You Go" (featuring Monie Love)	Simone Johnson; Kuklicz; Schmidt	DJ Tomekk; Thomas Schmidt	5:10
14.	"Biggie's Anruf"			1:53
15.	"Du Spast" (featuring Pain)	Pain; Kuklicz; Kalderim	DJ Tomekk; Bora Kalderim	2:51

Bonus tracks
No.	Title	Length
16.	"Saturday Love"	3:30
17.	"Mega Mix (Medley)"	15:00
Total length:		1:14:23

Notes

- Track 4 is a cover of "Jump" performed by Kris Kross

== Charts ==
Chart (2005)	Peak position
Austrian Albums (Ö3 Austria)	67
German Albums (Offizielle Top 100)	39
Swiss Albums (Schweizer Hitparade)	96
