= Leroy (film) =

- Directed by: Armin Völckers
- Starring: Alain Morel; Anna Hausburg
- Release date: 27 September 2007
- Running time: 89 minutes
- Country: Germany
- Language: German

Leroy is a 2007 German comedy film directed by Armin Völckers.

== Cast ==
- Alain Morel - Leroy
- Anna Hausburg - Eva
- Constantin von Jascheroff - Dimitrios
- Günther Kaufmann - Leroy's father
- Eva Mannschott - Leroy's mother
- Arnel Tači - Achmed
- Paul Maaß - Hanno
- Julius Jellinek - Horst
- Afrob
