= Kolchose =

The Kolchose is a group of Hip hop artists in the southern German city of Stuttgart. The group was founded in 1993 and includes the artists Freundeskreis, Massive Töne, Afrob, Breite Seite and Skillz en Masse, to name a few.
