= Die Firma =

German hip hop group

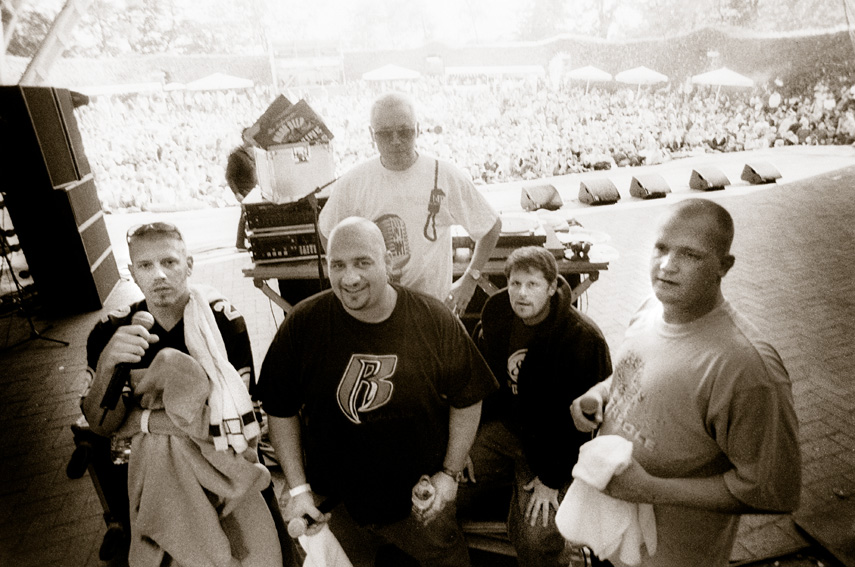
- Die Firma in 1999

Background information
- Origin: Cologne, Germany
- Genres: Hip hop
- Years active: 1996–present
- Members: Tatwaffe (Alexander Tarboven); Def Benski Obiwahn (Ben Hartung); Fader Gladiator (Daniel Sluga)

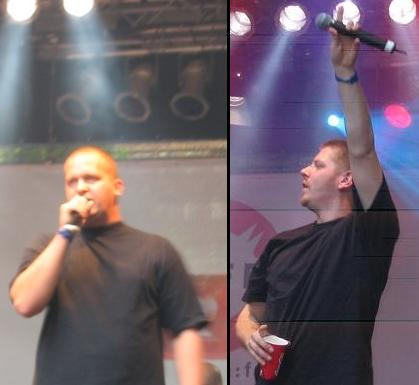
Tatwaffe (left) and Def Benski Obiwahn in 2005

Die Firma is a German hip hop group formed in Cologne in 1996. It consists of Tatwaffe (Alexander Trabhoven), Def Benski Obiwahn (Ben Hartung), and Fader Gladiator (Daniel Sluga). To date, they have released six albums. Their second album sold over 80.000 copies in Germany and reached number 8 on the German album charts. They are best known for their 2005 hit "Die Eine" ("The One"), which peaked at number 2 on the German single charts. The band refers to its own style as "lyrics about beats that represent good and evil".

In 2016, Tatwaffe released his second solo album, Sternenklar ("Starlit"), while Fader Gladiator worked with other artists like Lumaraa and Pillath.

== Discography ==
=== Albums ===
- 1998: Spiel des Lebens
- 1999: Das zweite Kapitel
- 2002: Das dritte Auge
- 2005: Krieg und Frieden
- 2007: Goldene Zeiten
- 2009: Gesammelte Werke
- 2010: Das sechste Kapitel

=== Singles ===
- 1996: Die Eine 96
- 1999: Scheiß auf die Hookline
- 1999: Kap der guten Hoffnung
- 1999: Das neue Jahrtausend
- 2002: Hör ma!
- 2002: Strassenfest
- 2003: Kein Ende in Sicht
- 2005: Die Eine 2005
- 2005: Spiel des Lebens
- 2007: Glücksprinzip
- 2007: Wunder
- 2007: Wunschzettel (feat. CJ Taylor)
- 2008: Scheiss auf die Hookline II

=== DVDs ===
- 2002: Das dritte Auge (limited edition)
