= MC Rene =

German rapper and comedian

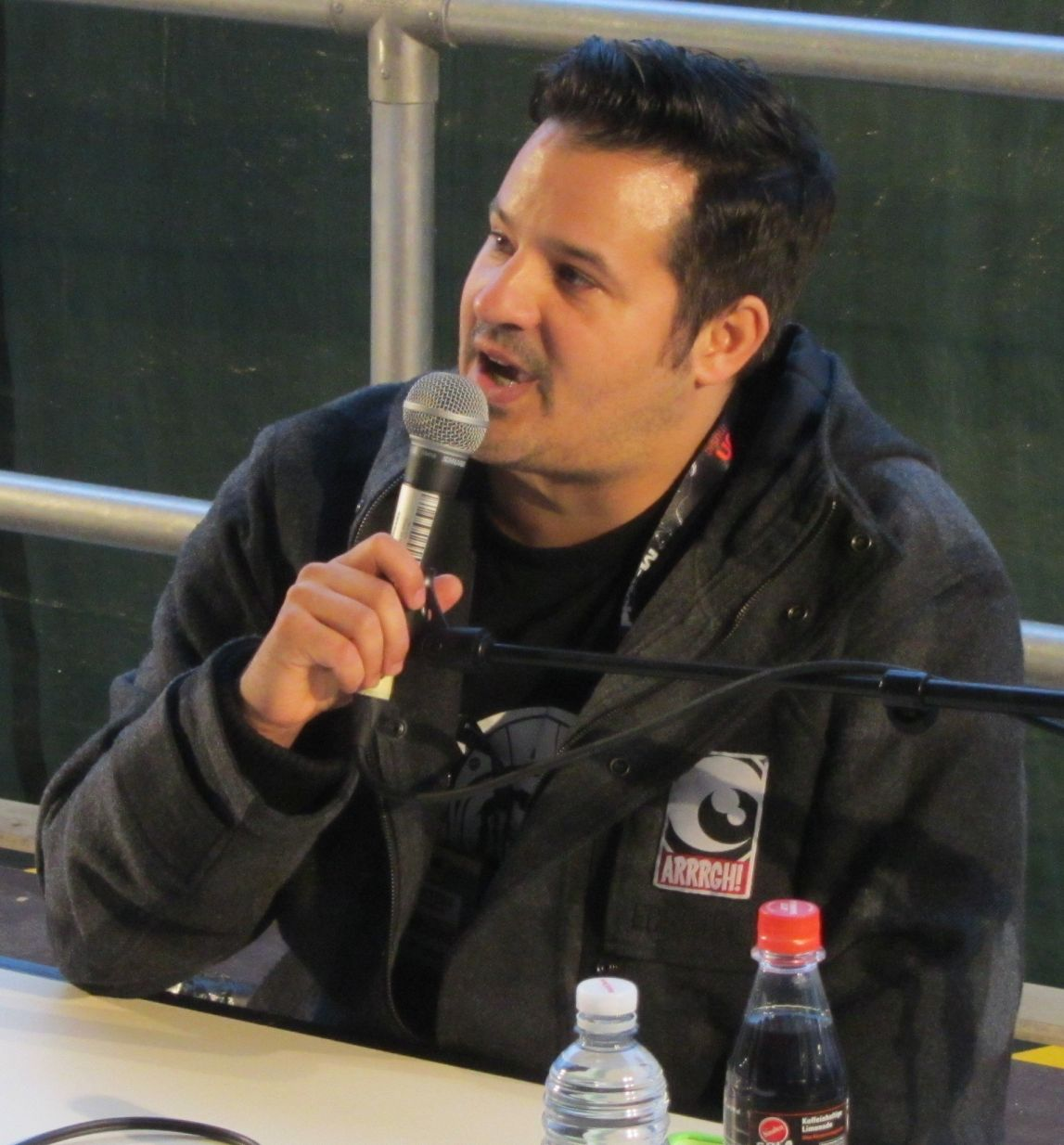
- MC Rene in 2013

Background information
- Born: René El Khazraje; 11 September 1976 (age 49); Braunschweig, West Germany
- Occupations: Rapper, comedian
- Website: mcrene.de

René El Khazraje (born 11 September 1976 in Braunschweig), best known by his stage name MC Rene, is a German rapper and stand-up comedian.

== Discography ==
Albums

- 1995: Renevolution
- 1995: Renevolution Instrumentals
- 1999: Reneflektion
- 2000: Ein Album namens Bernd
- 2002: Scheiß auf euren Hip Hop
- 2005: Der Letzte Marokkaner
- 2013: Alles auf eine Karte (feat. Carl Crinx; audiobook)
- 2015: Renessance (feat. Carl Crinx; CD)
- 2016: Khazraje
- 2021: Irgendwas Stimmt
- 2022: Ein Album Namens Bernd
- 2025: Das Ende vom Anfang

Singles

- 1994: Die neue Reimgeneration (12")
- 1994: Reimenergie (MCD/12")
- 1995: Spüre diesen Groove (MCD/12")
- 1995: Ein anderer Ausflug (MCD/12")
- 1996: Ein anderer Ausflug (Stieber Twins Remix) (12")
- 2000: Zieh dir das rein (MCD/12")
- 2000: Ich würde alles für dich tun (MCD/12")
- 2002: Pump up den Shit (MCD/12")
- 2005: Reens Welt/Die Enthüllung (Remix) (MCD/12")

As a featured artist

Year	Artist	Single	Chart positions		
Year	Artist	Single	GER	AUT	SWI
1999	DJ Tomekk	"1, 2, 3, ... Rhymes Galore" (featuring alongside Grandmaster Flash, Flavor Flav and Afrob)	6	9	34
2001	DJ Tomekk	"Return of Hip Hop (Ooh, Ooh)" (featuring alongside KRS-One and Torch)	13	64	22

== Bibliography ==
- El Khazraje, René (2012). MC Rene. Alles auf eine Karte. Rowohlt Verlag. ISBN 978-3-499-62969-3.
