= Freundeskreis =

German hip hop group

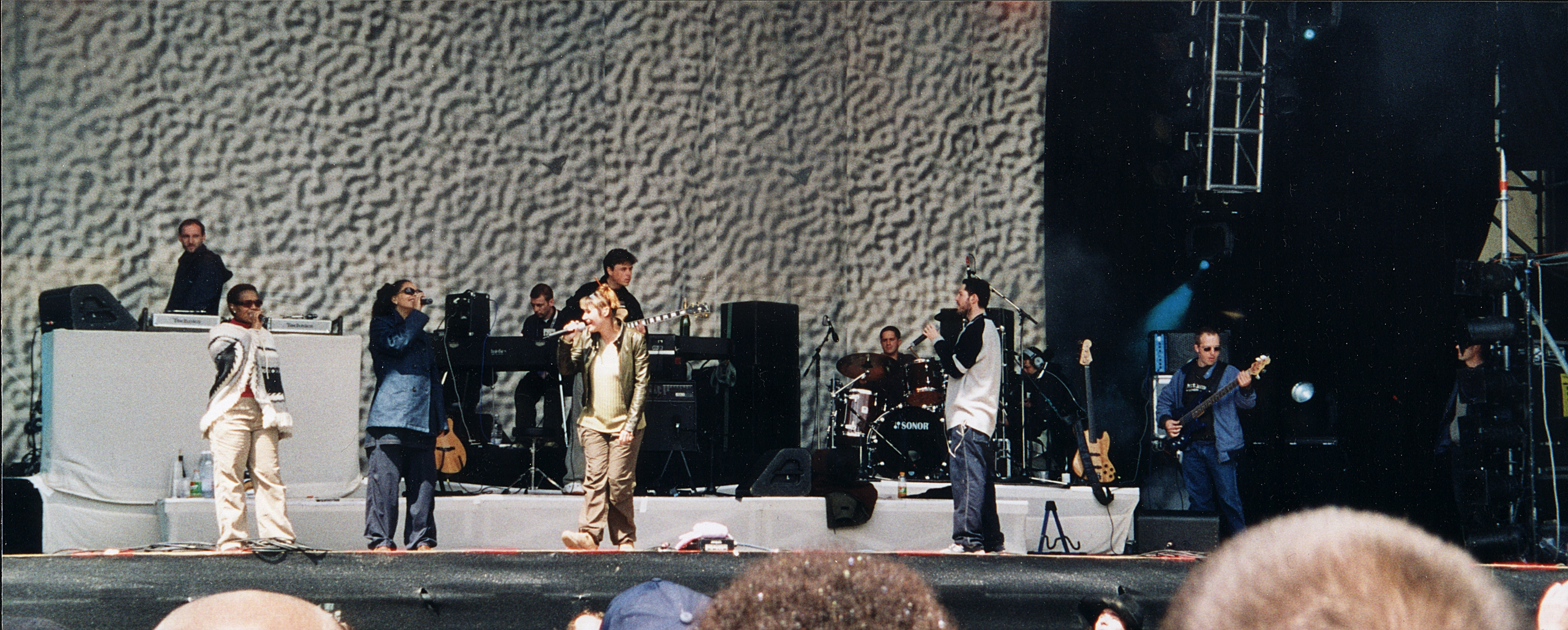

Background information
- Origin: Stuttgart, Germany
- Genres: German hip hop Hip hop Rap
- Years active: 1996–2007
- Label: Four Music
- Past members: Maximilian "Max" Herre "Don" Philippe Kayser; Martin "Friction" Welzer
- Website: Official website

Freundeskreis (meaning "Circle of Friends") also known as FK, were a German hip hop group from Stuttgart. They performed songs in German, English, French and Esperanto. The members were Max Herre, Don Philippe and DJ Friction.

They were a socially conscious German rap group that released three top twenty albums.

== History ==
=== Freundeskreis ===
Freundeskreis were primarily known for their political lyrics, in which they advocate equality and international understanding. After the much-noticed first album, Quadratur des Kreises (Squaring the Circle), and its hit single "A-N-N-A" which peaked at #6 in the German charts, the band released its second album, Esperanto, named after the constructed language Esperanto. The reasoning for the name was that the group wished to show that they believe that hip hop should be the Esperanto of youth.

In 1999 and 2000, the band was back in the charts with the singles "Mit Dir" (With you; featuring Joy Denalane, who would later become Herre's wife) and "Tabula Rasa Pt. II". For the soundtrack of the film 23, Freundeskreis covered the song "Halt dich an deiner Liebe fest" (Hold on to your love) written by Rio Reiser, voicing it on Lee "Scratch" Perry's police & thieves riddim. Freundeskreis was one of the first bands to take part in the Kolchose, a group of hip hop artists from Stuttgart.

In 2001, the band took a break for the members to pursue solo careers, the most active being Herre, who has released a solo album and works as producer for his wife.

A Freundeskreis greatest hits album was released in July 2007 under the title FK10. After announcing their breakup in summer 2007, Freundeskreis gave their last concert in Stuttgart on 19 September 2007.

== Conscious lyrics ==
Freundeskreis have been considered as a conscious hip-hop artist as their lyrics have educational themes. The song "Leg Dein Ohr Auf Die Schiene Der Geschichte" (lay your ear on the tracks of history) asks listeners to look beyond what they were taught in history lessons and learn the real lessons of history.

Excerpts from "Leg Dein Ohr Auf Die Schiene Der Geschichte""

viele Menschen schrecken zurück wenn sie "Geschichte" hör'n

Geschichte...

vier langweilige Stunden pro Woche in der Schule

(...)

neunzehnhundertdreiundsiebzig Geburtsjahr wichtig für mich

als auch geschichtlich denn da wurd' klar dass die C.I.A. 'ne Hure war

Rough translation:

many people step away when they hear "history"

History...

Four boring lessons in school a week

(...)

nineteenseventythree, birth year, important for me,

as well as historically, because then it became clear that the CIA was a whore

The rest of the song takes into account other historical events important to his year of birth, as well as other events throughout his childhood which are often overlooked. The chorus implores,

you're just a part of it so get to the heart of it

'cause if you don't go you won't know

you're just a part of it get to the heart of it

'cause if you don't go you never ever never ever gonna know

=== FK Allstars ===
FK Allstars was a collaboration of several hip hop, soul, and reggae artists, including Max Herre, Sekou Neblett, Afrob, Brooke Russell, Joy Denalane and Gentleman. Despite the FK Allstars band having its roots in hip hop, there are elements of reggae, soul, funk and jazz blended in.

== Discography ==
=== Albums ===
Year	Title	Chart position
Year	Title	Germany
1997	Quadratur des Kreises	12
1999	Esperanto	3
2007	FK 10 - Best Of	15

=== Singles ===
Year	Title	Chart position
Year	Title	Germany
1997	"A-N-N-A"	6
1997	"Leg dein Ohr auf die Schiene der Geschichte" (Put your ear on the tracks of history)	-
1997	"Wenn der Vorhang fällt" (When the curtain falls)	77
1998	"Tabula rasa" with Mellowbag and Gentleman	13
1998	"Halt dich an deiner Liebe fest"	30
1999	"Esperanto"	46
1999	"Mit Dir" with Joy Denalane	9
1999	"You can't run away" with Gentleman and Udo Lindenberg	74
2000	"Tabula Rasa Pt. II" with FK Allstars	30
2007	"FK 10"	-

== See also ==
- German hip hop
- Esperanto music
- Ich Zwerg
