= Prezident Brown =

Jamaican vocalist (born 1965)

- Also known as: Junior
- Born: Fitz Albert Cotterell c. 1965
- Origin: Clarendon, Jamaica
- Genres: Reggae
- Occupations: Recording Artist, Singjay/Chant
- Instrument: Vocal
- Years active: 1980s–present
- Website: prezidentbrownmusic.com

Fitz Albert Cotterell (born c. 1965), better known as Prezident Brown, is a Jamaican reggae/dancehall vocalist

== Biography ==
Fitz Albert Cotterell was born in Johnny's Hill district on the Bullhead Mountain, Jamaica in the mid-1960s and raised in Oracabessa, St. Mary. He built up a reputation by performing on local sound systems throughout the 1980s, under various names including Junior Ranking, before starting his recording career in the late 1980s. He was given the name Prezident Brown by producer and sound system operator Jack Ruby, who made him the resident deejay on his Hi-Power sound system. Early singles included "Tears" and "Everything is Right" (with Jack Radics) and (Professor Frisky)and all time Jamaican favourite song "Mickey Mouse" on the DigitalB label. His lyrics concentrate on "cultural" themes. He broke through to a wider audience with performances in 1995 at the Reggae Sumfest and Reggae Sunsplash festivals. He recorded the anti-drugs song "Blow Your Nose" with Everton Blender, and "Wrong or Right", which received international daytime radio play. He was also featured on "Black and Proud" on the Steel Pulse album Rage and Fury. He collaborated with Anthony Red Rose and Anthony Malvo on "Red Alert", which topped the Jamaican singles chart, and his continuing success saw him sign to Chris Blackwell's Island Jamaica label, although an album recorded for the label was never released.

He toured the United States in 2002, playing 46 shows including an appearance at the Sierra Nevada World Music Festival, and toured the US again in 2009.

In 2012 he released the album I Sound Is From Creation and again toured the US; in 2013 Prezident Brown toured in Europe

== Discography ==
- Big Bad and Talented (1995), X Rated/Runn Records
- Original Blue Print (1996), Digital B
- Prezident Selection (1996), Runn Records
- To Jah Only (Praying for the World) (1999), Kariang
- Showcase Volume One, Jahmani
- Showcase Volume Two, Jahmani
- Showcase Volume Three-Prepare Ye the Way, (2003) Jahmani
- Generation Next (2003)Chet/Sony
- Showcase Volume Four-Health And Strength (2007), Muzik Ave.
- Common Prosperity (2009), Tomorrow's Children
- I Sound Is From Creation (2012), Tad's
- The Journeyman Ep (2015), Tower Production
