= Stieber Twins =

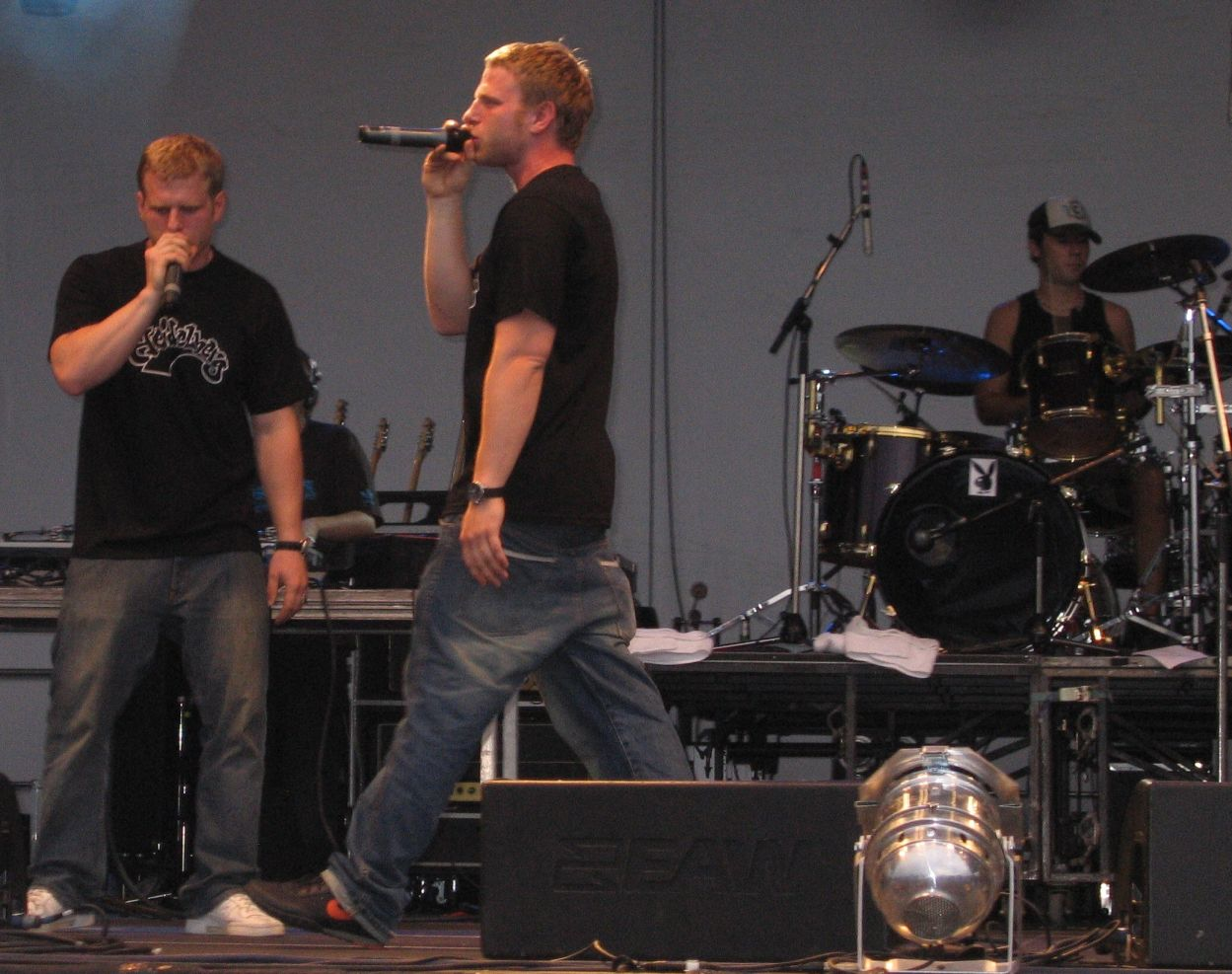

Background information
- Origin: Heidelberg, Germany
- Genres: German hip hop Hip hop Rap
- Years active: 1983 - present
- Labels: MZEE
- Members: Martin Stieber; Christian Stieber

The Stieber Twins are a duo from Heidelberg, Germany, consisting of the brothers Martin (Marshall Mar, a.k.a. Martin Jekyll) and Christian (Luxus Chris a.k.a. Christian Hyde). They are known as graffiti artists, breakdancers, rappers, hip hop producers and DJs.

The twins have been active since about 1983, and the two have been producing hip hop music since 1992. Their first instrumental was on the album Alte Schule ("Old school"), the first songs which featured the twins rapping were "HipHop und Rap" ("HipHop and Rap") and "Allein zu zweit" ("Alone Together") and were released in 1995 on the album The Sound of MZEE. They are considered to be pioneers of the German hip hop scene.

Although they have only released one rap album, they are well respected in Germany because of their lyrics, which are critical of the hip hop business and politics, all of which are performed in the distinctive accent of the Heidelberg, Germany area.

In 2006, the twins performed at the Hip Hop Kemp Festival in the Czech Republic.

Today, they are active as DJs and play all over Germany and especially in their hometown of Heidelberg.

== Discography ==
- Fenster zum Hof (Album, 1997, MZEE) engl. "Rear Window"
- "Just Writin' My Name" (feat. Zeb.Roc.Ski, 12″, MZEE)
- "Schlangen sind giftig" (12″, MZEE) engl. "Snakes are Venomous"
- "Malaria" (feat. Samy Deluxe and Max Herre, 12″, MZEE)
- "Speechless" (Instrumental 12″, Twinity)
- "Twin Beats" (Instrumental 12", MZEE)
