= Joy Denalane discography =

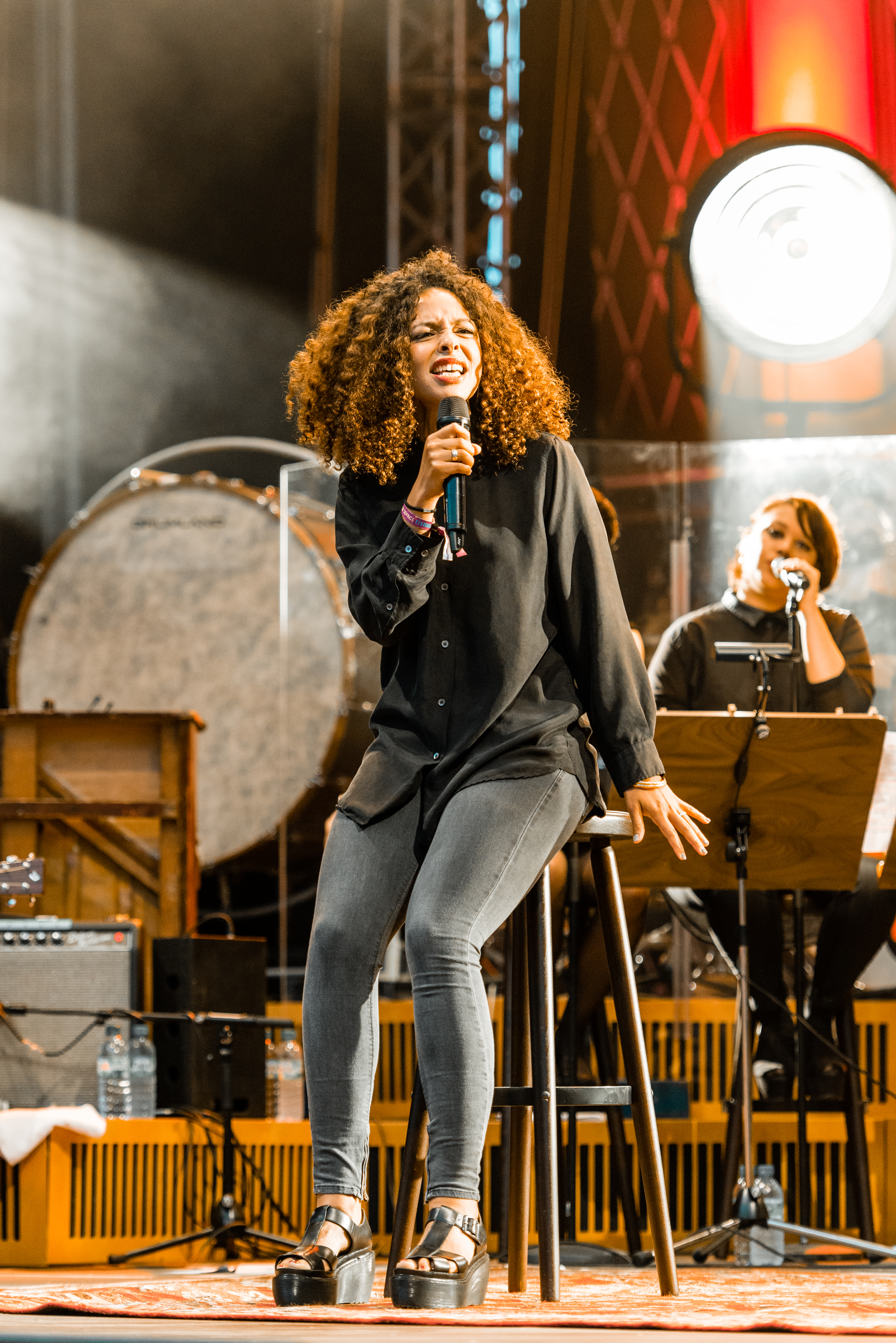
- Denalane live in Düsseldorf in 2014.
- Studio albums: 7
- Live albums: 2
- Singles: 17

German recording artist Joy Denalane has released six studio albums, two live albums and more than two dozen singles. Denalane scored her first chart entry in 1999, when she was featured on hip hop group Freundeskreis's single "Mit dir", a duet with future husband Max Herre, that became a top ten hit in Germany. Its success led to a recording deal with the Four Music label, which released her debut album Mamani in 2001. A soul album with elements of neo soul, jazz, and afro pop, it reached number eight on the German Albums Chart and earned a gold certification from the Bundesverband Musikindustrie (BVMI). It produced five singles and spawned the live album Mamani Live, which was released in 2004.

Following a longer hiatus in which she recorded collaborations with others musicians such as Herre, Afrob, and Common, Denalane released her second album Born & Raised in 2006. A breakaway form her previous album, it was entirely recorded in English language and took Denalane's work further into the rhythm and blues and hip hop genres. Upon its released, it debuted at number two in Germany and at number five on the Swiss Albums Chart. Both, the album and its lead single "Let Go", the latter of which entered the top thirty on the German Singles Chart, remain her highest-charting solo releases to date. In 2017, it reached Gold status in Germany.

Maureen, Denalane's first German-language album since Mamani, was released in 2011. It reached the top ten and top twenty in Germany and Switzerland respectively, but failed to produce a charting single. An English language version of the album was issued in 2012. In 2014, she became part of the German Band Aid 30 project; their rendition of which "Do They Know It's Christmas?" reached number-one on the German Singles Chart. In 2015, she released "Keine Religion", the theme song of the romantic comedy Traumfrauen (2015) as a single. It was followed by her fourth studio album Gleisdreieck, released in March 2017, which became her fourth top ten album in Germany, reaching number eight.

Following another hiatus, Denalane signed with Motown Records to release her fifth studio album Let Yourself Be Loved in 2020. Produced by Roberto Di Gioia, it marked the first project by a German artist to be released by the label as well as her third English language album. Let Yourself Be Loved debuted and peaked at number five on the German Albums Chart, becoming her highest-charting album in 14 years. In 2023, Lesedi Records released Willpower, Denalane's sixth studio album. Taking her work further into late 1970s-R&B, it was produced by Di Gioia and Herre and marked her lowest-charting album yet, when it debuted and peaked at number 33 on the German Albums Chart. Alles Liebe, a collaborative album with husband Max Herre, was released on November 1, 2024 and reached number five on the German Albums Chart.

== Albums ==
=== Studio albums ===
List of albums, with selected chart positions
Title	Album details	Peak chart positions			Certifications
Title	Album details	GER	AUT	SWI	Certifications
Mamani	Released: June 3, 2002; Format: CD, Download; Label: Four Music	8	44	54	BVMI: Gold
Born & Raised	Released: August 11, 2006; Format: CD, Download; Label: Nesola, Four Music	2	42	5	BVMI: Gold
Maureen	Released: May 20, 2011; Format: CD, Download; Label: Nesola, Four Music	8	36	11	
Gleisdreieck	Released: March 3, 2017; Format: CD, download; Label: Nesola	8	36	25	
Let Yourself Be Loved	Released: September 4, 2020; Format: CD, download; Label: Nesola, Motown	5	—	22	
Willpower	Released: October 6, 2023; Format: CD, download; Label: Lesedi, Four Music	33	—	—	
Alles Liebe	Released: November 1, 2024; Format: CD, download; Label: Lesedi, Four Music	5	57	22	
A Joyful Christmas	Released: November 20, 2026; Format: CD, download; Label: Lesedi, Four Music	To be released			

=== Live albums ===
List of albums, with selected chart positions
Title	Album details	Peak chart positions		
Title	Album details	GER	AUT	SWI
Mamani Live	Released: October 18, 2004; Format: CD, Download; Label: Four Music	44	—	—
The Dresden Soul Symphony (with Bilal, Dwele, Tweet, and MDR Symphony Orchestra)	Released: October 24, 2008; Format: DVD, CD; Label: Four Music	—	—	—

== Singles ==
=== As a main artist ===
List of singles, with selected chart positions, showing year released and album name
Title	Year	Peak chart positions			Album
Title	Year	GER	AUT	SWI	Album
"Can't Stop, Won't Stop" (featuring Scorpio)	1999	—	—	—	Non-album single
"Time Heals the Pain"	1999	—	—	—	Non-album single
"Sag's Mir"	2001	—	—	—	Mamani
"Geh Jetzt"	2002	64	—	—	Mamani
"Was Auch Immer"	2002	86	—	—	Mamani
"Im Ghetto von Soweto"	2003	—	—	—	Mamani
"Kinderlied"	2003	—	—	—	Mamani
"Höchste Zeit"	2004	—	—	—	Mamani Live
"Let Go"	2006	26	—	46	Born & Raised
"Heaven or Hell" (featuring Raekwon)	2006	—	—	—	Born & Raised
"Sometimes Love"	2007	—	—	—	Born & Raised
"Change" (featuring Lupe Fiasco)	2007	—	—	—	Born & Raised
"Niemand (Was wir nicht tun)"	2011	—	—	—	Maureen
"Nie wieder, nie mehr" (featuring Julian Williams)	2012	—	—	—	Maureen
"Keine Religion"	2015	97	—	—	Traumfrauen soundtrack
"Alles leuchtet"	2017	—	—	—	Gleisdreieck
"Wieder Kind" (with BRKN)	2018	—	—	—	Non-album single
"I Believe" (featuring BJ the Chicago Kid)	2020	—	—	—	Let Yourself Be Loved
"Top of My Love"	2020	—	—	—	Let Yourself Be Loved
"I Gotta Know"	2020	—	—	—	Let Yourself Be Loved
"Use Me"	2021	—	—	—	Let Yourself Be Loved (deluxe edition)
"The Show"	2021	—	—	—	Let Yourself Be Loved (deluxe edition)
"Forever"	2021	—	—	—	Let Yourself Be Loved (deluxe edition)
"An meiner Seite"	2022	—	—	—	Non-album single
"Christmas Will Really Be Christmas"	2022	—	—	—	Non-album single
"Hideaway"	2023	—	—	—	Willpower
"Happy" (featuring Ghostface Killah)	2023	—	—	—	Willpower
"Fly By"	2023	—	—	—	Willpower
"The Christmas Song"	2023	—	—	—	Non-album single
"Alles Liebe" (with Max Herre)	2024	—	—	—	Alles Liebe
"Driving Home for Christmas" (with Rea Garvey and Esther Graf)	2025	—	—	—	Non-album single
"I Miss the Summer Already"	2026	—	—	—	Non-album single
"My Favorite Things"	2026	—	—	—	A Joyful Christmas

=== As a featured artist ===
List of singles, with selected chart positions, showing year released and album name
Title	Year	Peak chart positions			Album
Title	Year	GER	AUT	SWI	Album
"Mit Dir" (Freundeskreis with Joy Denalane)	1999	9	30	12	Esperanto
"So Many Men" (Youssou N'Dour featuring Joy Denalane)	2003	—	—	—	Non-album single
"Torch of Freedom" ([Re:Jazz] featuring Joy Denalane)	2003	—	—	—	Non-album single
"1ste Liebe" (Max Herre with Joy Denalane)	2004	33	—	—	Max Herre
"GO! (Remix)" (Common featuring Joy Denalane)	2005	—	—	—	Be
"Do They Know It's Christmas?" (with Band Aid 30 Germany)	2014	1	10	21	Non-album single
"Bathele" (Mafikizolo featuring Joy Denalane)	2019	—	—	—	African Legends
"Das Wenigste" (Max Herre featuring Joy Denalane)	2019	—	—	—	Athen
"What You Give" (Web Web featuring Joy Denalane)	2020	—	—	—	Worshippers
"Golden" (Noah Slee featuring Joy Denalane)	2022	—	—	—	It Takes a Village

== Album appearances ==
Song	Year	Artist(s)	Album
"Whats Up with That"	1999	DJ Thomilla, Joy Denalane	Genuine Draft
"Mit Dir"	1999	Freundeskreis (with Joy Denalane)	Esperanto
"Tabula Rasa, Pt. II"	1999	Freundeskreis (featuring FK Allstars)	Esperanto
"Nicht Allein (Absolut Nicht Remix)"	2000	Absolute Beginner (featuring Joy Denalane)	Boombule (Bambule Remixed)
"Kuck ma' wer da rollt"	2001	Afrob (featuring Joy Denalane & Max Herre)	Made In Germany
"In Due Time"	2001	Sékou (featuring Joy Denalane & Max Herre)	D.I.a.S.P.O.R.a
"Music"	2001	Tiefschwarz (feat. Joy Denalane)	RAL9005
"Torch of Freedom"	2002	[RE:Jazz], Joy Denalane	Infracom! Presents [Re:Jazz]
"Men's World"	2003	ASD (featuring Brooke Russell & Joy Denalane)	"Hey Du"
"1ste Liebe"	2004	Max Herre (with Joy Denalane)	Max Herre
"Soulmate"	2005	Afrob (featuring Joy Denalane)	Hammer
"Schlaflied für die Sehnsucht"	2005	Joy Denalane	Selma – in Sehnsucht eingehüllt
"Arouna"	2007	Angélique Kidjo (featuring Joy Denalane)	Djin Djin
"Ich geh für dich"	2007	Azad (featuring Joy Denalane)	Blockschrift
"À 2 contre tous"	2007	Passi (featuring Joy Denalane)	Évolution
"How Long Will It Last?"	2010	Nottz (featuring Joy Denalane)	You Need This Music
