= Let Yourself Be Loved =

Studio album by Joy Denalane
- Released: September 4, 2020
- Length: 37:01
- Language: English
- Label: Nesola; Vertigo Berlin; Motown
- Producer: Roberto Di Gioia

Joy Denalane chronology
Gleisdreieck (2017)	Let Yourself Be Loved (2020)	Willpower (2023)

Singles from Let Yourself Be Loved
- 1. "I Believe" Released: July 10, 2020

Let Yourself Be Loved is the fifth studio album by German soul singer Joy Denalane. It was released by Nesola, the label of Denalane and her husband Max Herre, in association with Vertigo Berlin and Motown Records on September 4, 2020. Produced by Roberto Di Gioia, it marked the first project by a German artist to be released by Motown as well as Denalane's third English language album following Born & Raised (2006) and the reissue of Maureen (2011). Let Yourself Be Loved debuted and peaked at number five on the German Albums Chart.

== Critical reception ==
Professional ratings
Review scores
Source	Rating
Laut.de	4/5 stars
Musikexpress	4.5/6 stars
Pop Magazine	4.5/5 stars
Rolling Stone	4/5 stars

Sven Kabelitz from Laut.de noted that "stories about the different facets of [love] connect the songs. She authentically resurrects the Motown era in all its different orientations, but incorporates enough Denalane everywhere so that it doesn't fail as a copy." Similarly, Musikexpress editor Thomas Winkler called Let Yourself Be Loved a "very monothematic album" and concluded: "A retro record, yes, but not a boring copy." Rolling Stone critic Markus Schneider wrote: "The best thing about these completely successful eleven songs is how artistically decisive, cohesive and self-confident they sound here."

== Chart performance ==
Let Yourself Be Loved debuted and peaked at number five on the German Albums Chart in the week of September 11, 2023. It became her highest-charting album since Born & Raised (2006) and marked Denalane's fifth consecutive top ten album in Germany. Elsewhere, it peaked at number 22 on the Swiss Albums Chart. Let Yourself Be Loved failed to chart in Austria.

== Track listing ==
All songs produced and arranged by Roberto Di Gioia.

Let Yourself Be Loved track listing
No.	Title	Writer(s)	Length
1.	"Wounded Love"	Sékou Neblett; Chris Soper; Jesse Singer; Joy Denalane; Nick Banns	3:00
2.	"Be Here in the Morning" (featuring C.S. Armstrong)	Chauncy S. Armstrong; Soper; Singer; Denalane; Banns; Sway Clarke	4:04
3.	"I Believe" (featuring BJ the Chicago Kid)	Neblett; Bryan Sledge; Soper; Singer; Denalane; Banns	2:51
4.	"The Ride"	Neblett; Soper; Singer; Denalane; Banns; Roberto Di Gioia	3:05
5.	"I Gotta Know"	Neblett; Soper; Singer; Denalane; Banns	3:03
6.	"Hey Dreamer"	Neblett; Soper; Singer; Denalane; Banns; Clarke	3:39
7.	"Stand"	Neblett; Soper; Singer; Denalane; Banns	3:17
8.	"Love Your Love"	Soper; Singer; Denalane; Banns; Clarke	3:42
9.	"Top of My Love"	Soper; Singer; Denalane; Banns; Clarke	3:19
10.	"Let Yourself Be Loved"	Neblett; Soper; Singer; Denalane; Banns; Di Gioia	3:16
11.	"Put in Work"	Neblett; Soper; Singer; Denalane; Banns	3:41
Total length:			37:02

Deluxe edition – disc 2
No.	Title	Writer(s)	Length
1.	"Use Me"	Bill Withers	3:49
2.	"Still It Ain't You"	Soper; Singer; Denalane; Banns; Clarke	2:51
3.	"The Show"	Soper; Singer; Denalane; Banns; Clarke; Di Gioia	2:43
4.	"Forever"	Soper; Singer; Denalane; Banns; Clarke	4:20
5.	"Give and Take"	Neblett; Soper; Singer; Denalane; Banns; Di Gioia	4:36
Total length:			55:22

== Charts ==
Chart performance for Let Yourself Be Loved
Chart (2020)	Peak position
German Albums (Offizielle Top 100)	5
Swiss Albums (Schweizer Hitparade)	22

== Release history ==
Let Yourself Be Loved release history
Region	Date	Edition	Format(s)	Label	Ref.
Various	September 4, 2020	Standard	CD; digital download; streaming; vinyl	Nesola; Vertigo Berlin; Motown	
Various	September 3, 2021	Deluxe	CD; digital download; streaming; vinyl	Nesola; Vertigo Berlin; Motown	
