= The Voice of Germany season 13 =

Season of television series

The Voice of Germany
- Season 13
- Promotional poster featuring coaches Keating, Zarrella, David, and Bill & Tom Kaulitz
- Hosted by: Thore Schölermann; Melissa Khalaj
- Coaches: Giovanni Zarrella; Bill & Tom Kaulitz; Shirin David; Ronan Keating; Rita Ora (battles ep. 14); Kool Savas (semi-finals)
- Winner: Malou Lovis Kreyelkamp
- Winning coach: Bill & Tom Kaulitz
- Runner-up: Desirey Sarpong Agyemang

Release
- Original network: ProSieben; Sat.1
- Original release: 21 September – 8 December 2023

Season chronology
- ← Previous; Season 12 Next → Season 14

The thirteenth season of the talent show The Voice of Germany premiered on 21 September 2023. The show was broadcast by two local TV stations, ProSieben and Sat.1, during the Blind Auditions and the Battles. The rest episodes of the season were broadcast by Sat.1 only.

Giovanni Zarrella, Bill & Tom Kaulitz, Shirin David and former The Voice Australia and The Voice Kids UK coach Ronan Keating joined the show as new coaches this season, replacing the four coaches in the previous season. Thore Schölermann returned for his twelfth season as host, with Melissa Khalaj returning for her second season as host.

Malou Lovis Kreyelkamp was named The Voice of Germany on December 8, 2023, making her the first winning artist to have a coach blocked in their blind audition. This marked Bill & Tom Kaulitz's first and only win as coaches, they became the sixth new coach to win their debut season. Also, Bill & Tom became the fourth duo coach to win The Voice of Germany.

== Panelists ==
=== Coaches ===
The Voice of Germany season 13 main coaches

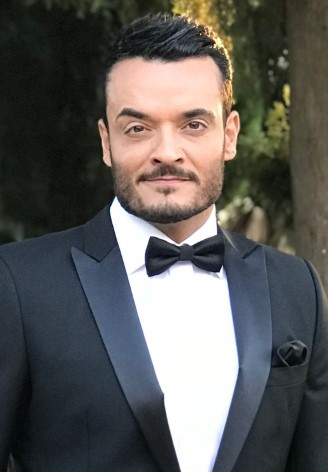
Giovanni Zarrella

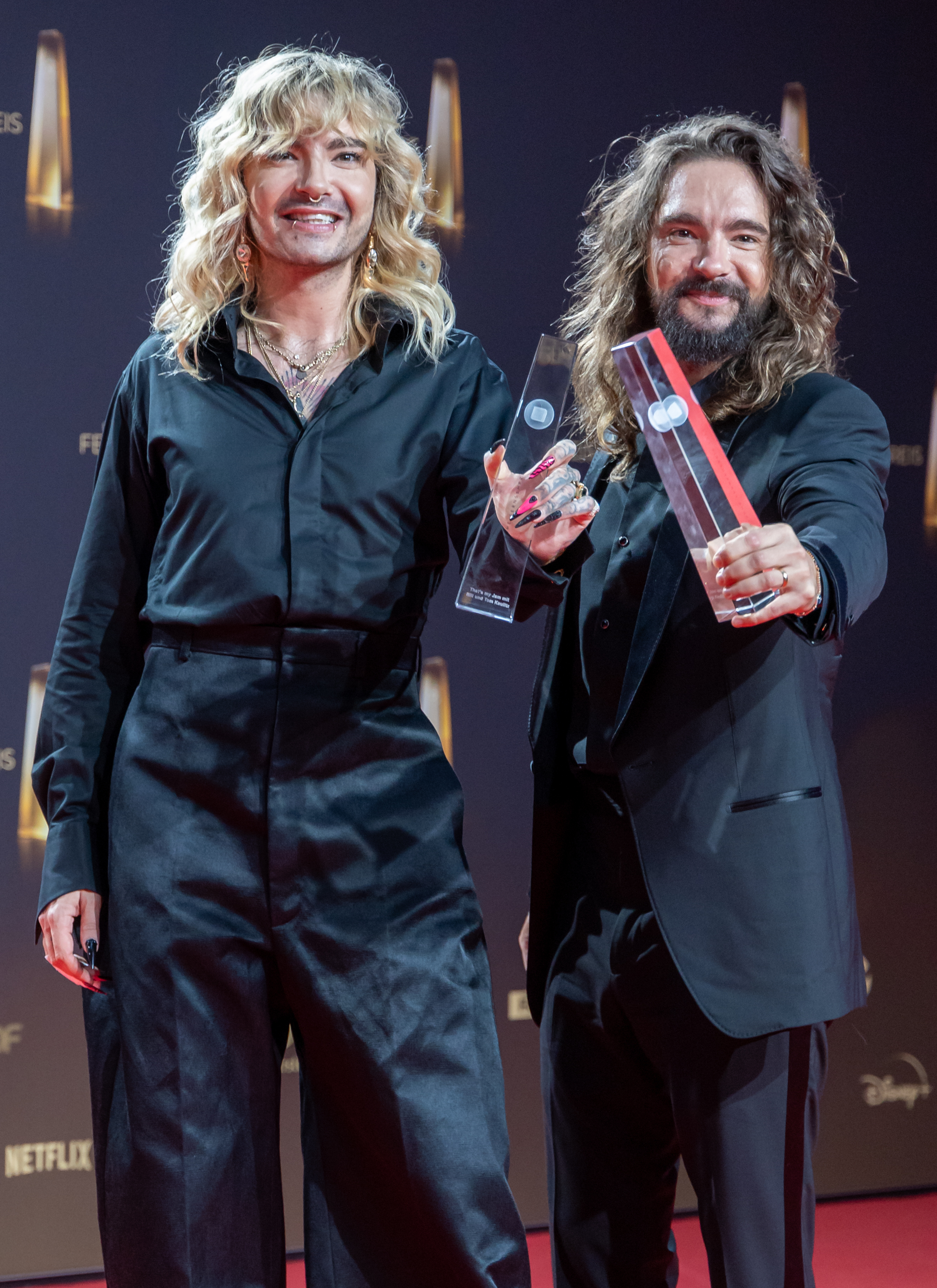
Bill & Tom Kaulitz

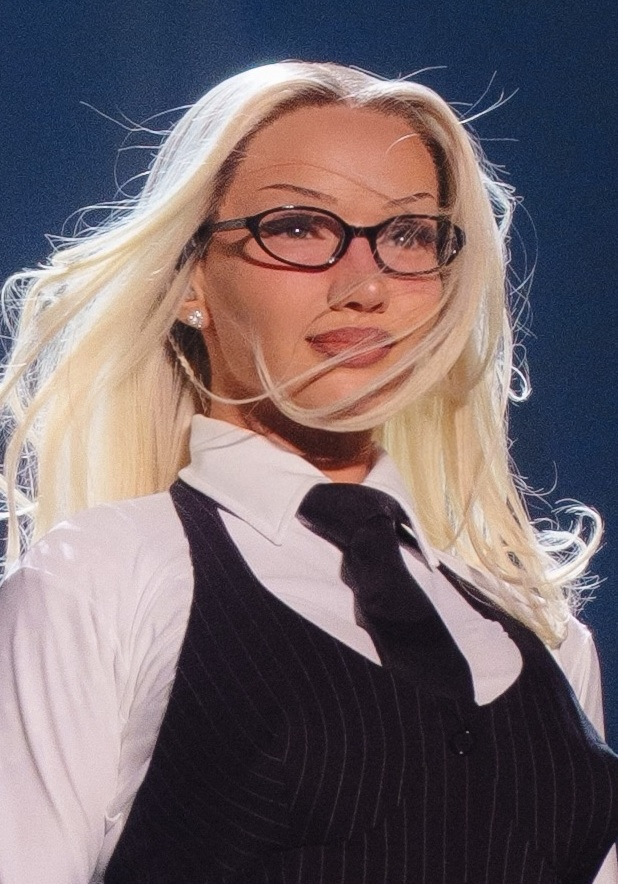
Shirin David

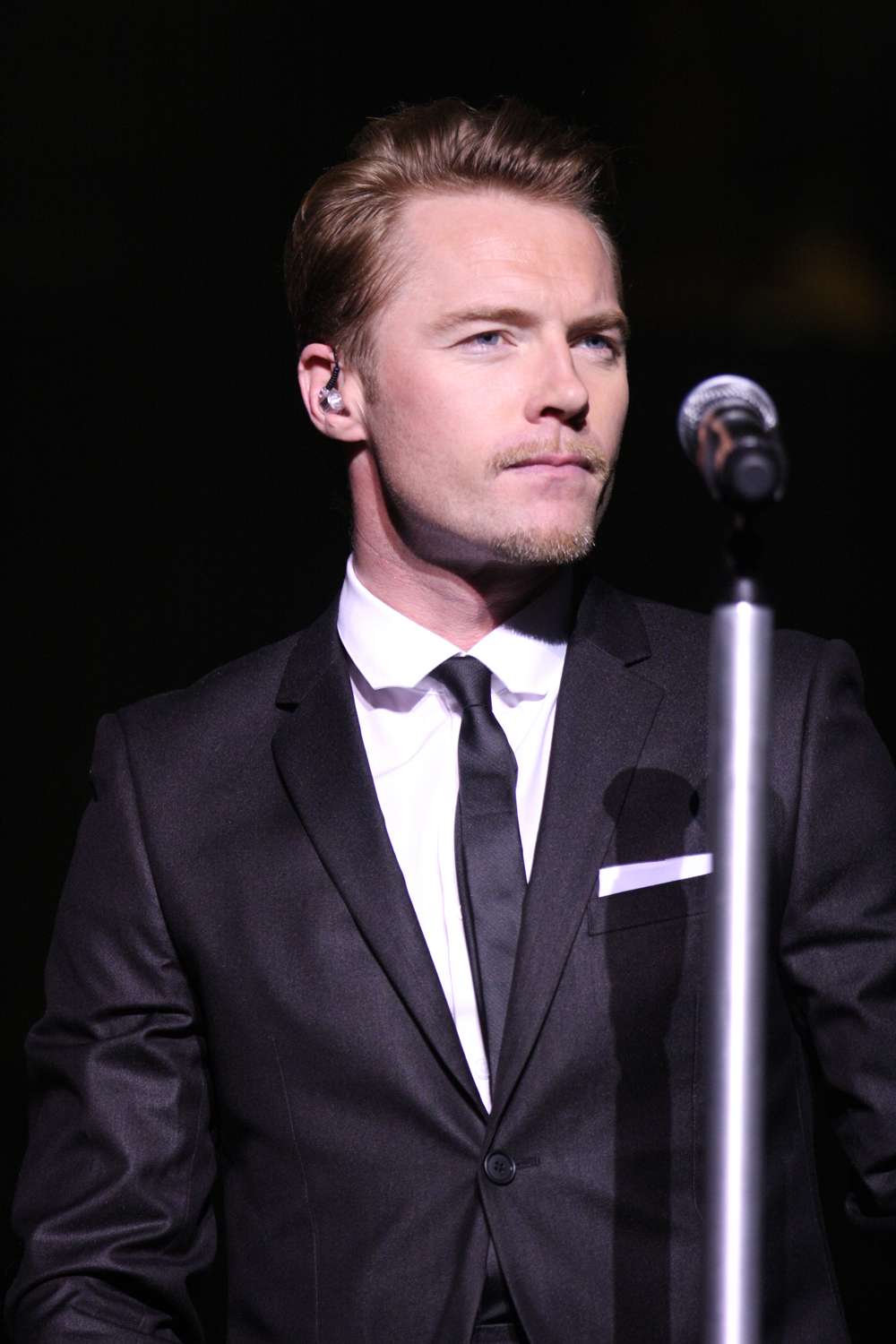
Ronan Keating

On 6 June 2023, ProSieben and Sat.1 announced that all four coaches from the previous season; Rea Garvey, Stefanie Kloß, Peter Maffay, and Mark Forster; would depart the panel for the upcoming thirteenth season. This marks the first season to have all coaches from the previous panel replaced. At the same time, it was announced that Giovanni Zarrella, Bill & Tom Kaulitz, Shirin David, and Ronan Keating would all join the panel for this season.

In the live semi-finals, Kool Savas, who served as a coach on The Voice Rap, joined as a coach to mentor his artist, Leon "Ezo" Weick, who had won The Voice Rap prior to the semi-finals.

=== Hosts ===
Both Thore Schölermann and Melissa Khalaj returned as hosts from last season.

== Teams ==
Teams color key
Winner	Eliminated in the Live shows
Runner-up	Eliminated in the Teamfights
Third place	Eliminated in the Battle rounds
Fourth place
Fifth place

Coaching teams
Coaches	Top 71 Artists				
Giovanni Zarrella					
Giovanni Zarrella	Desirey Sarpong Agyemang	Sorlo Hoffmann	Johann Bardowicks	Lizi Gozalishvili	Impulso Tenors
Giovanni Zarrella	Elias Biechele	Laura Schopf	Dan Mudd	Carlotta Bach	Anna Vichery
Giovanni Zarrella	Lauren Mace	Julia Szatmári	Marius Hof	Patrick Schmitt	Kevin Smith
Giovanni Zarrella	Nicole Scholz	Charles Johnson	Thomas Schmidbauer		
Bill & Tom Kaulitz					
Bill & Tom Kaulitz	Malou Lovis Kreyelkamp	Joel Marques Cunha	Marc Altergott	Naomi Mbiyeya	Niclas Scholz
Bill & Tom Kaulitz	Tatjana Falkner	Sebastian Zierof	Alina Zamalieva	Philip Hoffmann	Kristin Witte
Bill & Tom Kaulitz	Cemre Polat	Felix Deeg	Sina Lecking	Max Schrut	Luna Cavari
Bill & Tom Kaulitz	Franziska Bittner	Angela Peltner	Cäcilia Kubi		
Shirin David					
Shirin David	Joy Esquivias	Kim Schutzius	Danilo Timm	Finja Bernau	Lorenz Haase
Shirin David	Richard Vaupel	Fritz Speck	Linus Nehrig	Yang Ge	Moritz Steckenstein
Shirin David	Rudy Chopper	Süleyman Atar	Chayane Coetzee	Rouven Gruber	Luca Grace Kampmann
Shirin David	Justyna Chaberek	Kevin Derbas			
Ronan Keating					
Ronan Keating	Egon Herrnleben	Emely Myles	Kimmy June	Susan Albers	Anna Ebner
Ronan Keating	Alex Seeger	Anne Mosters	Simon Schmerbeck	Jaqueline Bloem	Felix Brückner & Kai Nötting
Ronan Keating	Annemarie Schmidt	Priti Pawar	Katharina Bongard & Arestak Babakyan	Vikrant Subramanian	Oskar Jelitto
Ronan Keating	Valentina Franco	Lisa Christ	Theresa Steininger		
Kool Savas					
Kool Savas	Leon "Ezo" Weick				

== Blind Auditions ==
The Blind Auditions began broadcasting 21 September 2023, being broadcast every Thursday on ProSieben and every Friday on Sat.1. New this season are the blocks, which were first introduced on the fourteenth season on the American version of the show. Each coach is allowed to block another coach thrice. Only one block is allowed per audition; once a coach already used their block, the other coaches are not allowed to use their block. At the end of the blind auditions, Giovanni Zarrella, Bill & Tom Kaulitz, and Ronan Keating managed to complete their teams.

Like season 11, the coaches performed separately. Each coach performed a song before introducing the next coach following the conclusion of their performance. Bill + Tom performed "White Lies", followed by Shirin David, who sang "Lieben Wir". Giovanni Zarrella performed "Senza Te (Ohne Dich)", followed by Ronan Keating, who performed "Life Is a Rollercoaster".

Blind auditions color key
✔	Coach hit his/her "I WANT YOU" button
	Artist defaulted to this coach's team
	Artist elected to join this coach's team
	Artist was eliminated with no coach pressing their button
	Artist received an 'All Turn'.
✘	Coach pressed "I WANT YOU" button, but was blocked by another coach from getting the artist
	Blocked by Giovanni; Blocked by Bill & Tom; Blocked by Shirin; Blocked by Ronan

Blind auditions results
Episode	Order	Artist	Age	Song	Coach's and artist's choices			
Episode	Order	Artist	Age	Song	Giovanni	Bill & Tom	Shirin	Ronan
Episode 1 (September 21)	1	Carlotta Bach	17	"Ave Maria"	✔	✔	✔	✔
Episode 1 (September 21)	2	Danilo Timm	35	"Landslide"	✘	–	✔	✔
Episode 1 (September 21)	3	Chiara Vogel	21	"I'm Outta Love"	–	–	–	–
Episode 1 (September 21)	4	Max Schrut	30	"Geile Zeit"	–	✔	–	✔
Episode 1 (September 21)	5	Luca Grace Kampmann	24	"Valerie"	✔	✔	✔	✔
Episode 1 (September 21)	6	Umut Uysaler	26	"Someone Like You"	–	–	–	–
Episode 1 (September 21)	7	Felix Brückner & Kai Nötting	32	"Wildberry Lillet"	✔	✔	–	✔
Episode 1 (September 21)	8	Sorlo Hoffmann	25	"Hinter dem Burnout"	✔	–	✔	✔
Episode 1 (September 21)	9	Roberta Lorenza	55	"I maschi"	–	–	–	–
Episode 1 (September 21)	10	Yang Ge ^{1}	34	"Truth Hurts"	✔	✔	✔	✔
Episode 2 (September 22)
Episode 2 (September 22)	1	Kim Schutzius	29	"When You Believe"	✔	✔	✔	✔
Episode 2 (September 22)	2	Cheyenne Kadlubek	22	"Masterpiece"	–	–	–	–
Episode 2 (September 22)	3	Fritz Speck	18	"5 Meter Mauern"	✔	✔	✔	✘
Episode 2 (September 22)	4	Judy Rafat	74	"Smile"	–	–	–	–
Episode 2 (September 22)	5	Marc Altergott	16	"A Song for You"	✔	✔	–	– ^{2}
Episode 2 (September 22)	6	Tana Wüthrich	23	"Girls Just Want to Have Fun"	–	–	–	–
Episode 2 (September 22)	7	Niclas Scholz	22	"Ace of Spades"	✔	✔	✔	✔
Episode 2 (September 22)	8	Priti Pawar	27	"Barbie Girl"	–	–	✘	✔
Episode 2 (September 22)	9	Dennis Buskohl	31	"Bilder Von Dir"	–	–	–	–
Episode 2 (September 22)	10	Theresa Steininger	20	"Welcome to Burlesque"	✔	–	✔	✔
Episode 2 (September 22)	11	Impulso Tenors	25–58	"Il mondo"	✔	✔	✔	✔
Episode 3 (September 24)
Episode 3 (September 24)	1	Joel Marques Cunha	25	"Way Down We Go"	✔	✔	✔	✘
Episode 3 (September 24)	2	Ioanna Gkrigkorian	18	"Bang Bang"	–	–	–	–
Episode 3 (September 24)	3	Kevin Smith	39	"Auf uns"	✔	–	✔	–
Episode 3 (September 24)	4	Lorenz Haase	22	"Eure Kinder"	✔	✔	✔	✔
Episode 3 (September 24)	5	Mirella Janev	21	"Mad World"	–	–	–	–
Episode 3 (September 24)	6	Elias Biechele	17	"You Will Be Found"	✔	–	–	✘
Episode 3 (September 24)	7	Patrice Godefroid	73	"You'll Never Walk Alone"	–	–	–	–
Episode 3 (September 24)	8	Patrick Schmitt	41	"Abenteuerland"	✔	–	–	–
Episode 3 (September 24)	9	Richard Vaupel	20	"Can't Wait Until Tonight"	✔	✔	✔	✘
Episode 3 (September 24)	10	Lucie Fadinger	37	"I Love Rock 'n' Roll"	–	–	–	–
Episode 3 (September 24)	11	Anne Mosters	17	"Love in the Dark"	✔	✔	–	✔
Episode 4 (September 29)
Episode 4 (September 29)	1	Lisa Christ	18	"Voyage Voyage"	✔	✔	✔	✔
Episode 4 (September 29)	2	Leandro Mendoza	N/A	"Un-Break My Heart"	–	–	–	–
Episode 4 (September 29)	3	Linus Nehrig	19	"Kiss Me"	✘	✔	✔ ^{3}	✔
Episode 4 (September 29)	4	Chayane Coetzee	25	"Billie Jean"	✔	✔	✔	– ^{4}
Episode 4 (September 29)	5	Laura Schopf	22	"Goodbye My Lover"	✔	–	–	✔
Episode 4 (September 29)	6	Egon Herrnleben	39	"Whiskey in the Jar"	–	✔	–	✔
Episode 4 (September 29)	7	Sabrina Sauder	38	"Wer Liebe lebt"	–	–	–	–
Episode 4 (September 29)	8	Thomas Schmidbauer	34	"I'll Be Waiting"	✔	–	–	–
Episode 4 (September 29)	9	Sven Ablaß	52	"Stark"	–	–	–	–
Episode 4 (September 29)	10	Desirey Sarpong Agyemang	20	"You Broke Me First"	✔	✔	–	–
Episode 4 (September 29)	11	Valentin Schöppner	23	"Perfect"	–	–	–	–
Episode 4 (September 29)	12	Alina Zamalieva	18	"Nessun dorma"	✔	✔	✔	✔
Episode 5 (October 5)
Episode 5 (October 5)	1	Johann Bardowicks	25	"City of Stars"	✔	✔	✔	✔
Episode 5 (October 5)	2	Sebastian Zierof	39	"Into the Unknown"	✔	✔	–	✔
Episode 5 (October 5)	3	Anna Zivkov	N/A	"Side to Side"	–	–	–	–
Episode 5 (October 5)	4	Charles Johnson	64	"Purple Rain"	✔	–	–	–
Episode 5 (October 5)	5	Emely Myles	33	"Cuz I Love You"	–	✔	✔	✔
Episode 5 (October 5)	6	Philipp Krenn	29	"Umbrella"	–	–	–	–
Episode 5 (October 5)	7	Joy Esquivias	25	"Symphony"	✔	✔	✔	✔
Episode 5 (October 5)	8	Amanda Morena	28	"Chöre"	–	–	–	–
Episode 5 (October 5)	9	Cemre Polat	25	"Kleiner Finger Schwur"	–	✔	–	–
Episode 5 (October 5)	10	Kei Lorenz	21	"Bad Memories"	–	–	–	–
Episode 5 (October 5)	11	Susan Albers	39	"I Have Nothing"	✔	✔	✘ ^{5}	✔
Episode 6 (October 6)
Episode 6 (October 6)	1	Kevin Derbas	26	"Rise Like a Phoenix"	✔	–	✔	✔
Episode 6 (October 6)	2	Bianca Schnelle	35	"Er Gehört Zu Mir"	–	–	–	–
Episode 6 (October 6)	3	Valentina Franco	36	"Runaway"	–	–	–	✔
Episode 6 (October 6)	4	Malou Lovis Kreyelkamp	24	"Rainbow Connection"	✔	✔	✔	✘
Episode 6 (October 6)	5	Patrick Smith	N/A	"Jessie"	–	–	–	–
Episode 6 (October 6)	6	Maximilian Qunaj	31	"Sneak Preview"	–	–	–	–
Episode 6 (October 6)	7	Jaqueline Bloem	34	"All of Me"	–	–	✔	✔
Episode 6 (October 6)	8	Majanko Bauer	27	"Breakeven"	–	–	–	–
Episode 6 (October 6)	9	Cäcilia Kubi	31	"Durch den Monsun"	✔	✔	✔	✔
Episode 6 (October 6)	10	Alexander Fechtig	31	"You're Beautiful"	–	–	–	–
Episode 6 (October 6)	11	Julia Szatmári	36	"Feels Like Home"	✔	–	–	–
Episode 6 (October 6)	12	Rouven Gruber	20	"Ich Will Wur"	✔	✔	✔	✔
Episode 7 (October 12)
Episode 7 (October 12)	1	Justyna Chaberek	34	"How Will I Know"	✔	✔	✔	–
Episode 7 (October 12)	2	Sina Lecking	21	"We Are Never Ever Getting Back Together"	–	✔	–	✔
Episode 7 (October 12)	3	Manfred Lohuis	N/A	"Human"	–	–	–	–
Episode 7 (October 12)	4	Marcel Rainprecht	22	"More Than Words"	–	–	–	–
Episode 7 (October 12)	5	Lizi Gozalishvili	19	"Earth Song"	✔	✔	–	–
Episode 7 (October 12)	6	Simon Schmerbeck	22	"I Guess I'm in Love"	–	–	–	✔
Episode 7 (October 12)	7	Tatjana Falkner	25	"Holding Out for a Hero"	✔	✔	✘	✔
Episode 7 (October 12)	8	Dario Pellino	N/A	"Late Night Talking"	–	–	–	–
Episode 7 (October 12)	9	Vikrant Subramanian	34	"Both Sides, Now"	✔	–	–	✔
Episode 7 (October 12)	10	Tobias Enzl	N/A	"Bierle In Da Sun"	–	–	–	–
Episode 7 (October 12)	11	Angela Peltner	43	"Leuchtturm"	–	✔	–	–
Episode 7 (October 12)	12	Alex Seeger	24	"Dancing Queen"	✔	✔	–	✔
Episode 8 (October 13)
Episode 8 (October 13)	1	Naomi Mbiyeya	19	"Für Immer Ab Jetzt"	✔	✔	–	✔
Episode 8 (October 13)	2	Katharina Bongard & Arestak Babakyan	37 & 30	"Fall on Me"	✔	–	–	✔
Episode 8 (October 13)	3	Manuela Tayler	39	"Piece of My Heart"	–	–	–	–
Episode 8 (October 13)	4	Finja Bernau	20	"Denkmal"	–	–	✔	–
Episode 8 (October 13)	5	Vivien Barman	24	"Don't Start Now"	–	–	–	–
Episode 8 (October 13)	6	Philip Hoffmann	24	"Circle of Life"	✔	✔	✔	✘
Episode 8 (October 13)	7	Johanna Löhr	18	"Let It Go"	–	–	–	–
Episode 8 (October 13)	8	Marius Hof	27	"Was Du Liebe Nennst"	✔	–	–	–
Episode 8 (October 13)	9	Kristin Witte	20	"Gold"	✔	✔	–	✔
Episode 8 (October 13)	10	Adil Madougou	N/A	"Fly Me to the Moon"	–	–	–	–
Episode 8 (October 13)	11	Gabi Steinbach	N/A	"Rolling in the Deep"	–	–	–	–
Episode 8 (October 13)	12	Dan Mudd	44	"Hoochie Coochie Man"	✔	–	–	✔
Episode 9 (October 19)
Episode 9 (October 19)	1	Annemarie Schmidt	23	"Afterglow"	–	–	–	✔
Episode 9 (October 19)	2	Anna Vichery	39	"Ich hätt getanzt heut Nacht"	✔	✔	✔	✔
Episode 9 (October 19)	3	Joao Rodrigues-Pio	25	"Ex's & Oh's"	–	–	–	–
Episode 9 (October 19)	4	Lanya Al Gumur	21	"How You Like That"	–	–	–	–
Episode 9 (October 19)	5	Anna Ebner	19	"Rest der Welt"	✔	–	–	✔
Episode 9 (October 19)	6	Asja Ahatovic	25	"Domino"	–	–	–	–
Episode 9 (October 19)	7	Felix Deeg	21	"Escape"	–	✔	✔	–
Episode 9 (October 19)	8	Selina Schlier	26	"Feel It Still"	–	–	–	–
Episode 9 (October 19)	9	Oskar Jelitto	17	"Never Gonna Give You Up"	–	–	✔	✔
Episode 9 (October 19)	10	Luna Cavari	26	"I See Red"	–	✔	–	–
Episode 9 (October 19)	11	Lauren Mace	38	"Flowers"	✔	–	–	–
Episode 9 (October 19)	12	Dave Schaefer	55	"All Right Now"	–	–	–	–
Episode 9 (October 19)	13	Kimmy June	28	"Jolene"	✔	✔	✘	✔
Episode 10 (October 20)
Episode 10 (October 20)	1	Rudy Chopper	28	"Unholy"	–	–	✔	Team full
Episode 10 (October 20)	2	Franziska Bittner	23	"Rinnsteinprinzessin"	–	✔	✔	Team full
Episode 10 (October 20)	3	Sandra Exner-Niebergall	52	"Sleeping in My Car"	–	Team full	–	Team full
Episode 10 (October 20)	4	Süleyman Atar	25	"Stärker"	–	Team full	✔	Team full
Episode 10 (October 20)	5	Moritz Steckenstein	37	"I'm Like A Bird"	✔	Team full	✔	Team full
Episode 10 (October 20)	6	Aquilla Fearon	50	"You Are the Reason"	–	Team full	–	Team full
Episode 10 (October 20)	7	Nicole Scholz	27	"Call Me"	✔	Team full	✔	Team full

- ^1 Yang Ge previously participated in the sixth season of The Voice Russia, where she was coached by Dima Bilan. She was brought to the finals, finishing in 4th place.
- ^2 Giovanni blocked Ronan, but Ronan did not press his button, so the block did not count.
- ^3 Bill & Tom tried to block Shirin, but was not possible, since Ronan already blocked Giovanni.
- ^4 Shirin blocked Ronan, but Ronan did not press his button, so the block did not count.
- ^5 Bill & Tom successfully pressed the block button on Shirin, but Giovanni had already blocked Shirin so the block didn't count.

== Battles ==
The Battles began broadcasting on 20 October 2023, being broadcast every Thursday on ProSieben and every Friday on Sat.1. Coaches are divided into pairs (one trio in the case of Shirin's team, as she has only 17 artists in her team). Each coach could select any number of candidates of each battle into the next phase, with each battle having one, multiple, or no winner. Each coach has to remain nine artists on their team after the battles. This is the first time since season 2 that there are no steals in this phase.

Battle rounds color key
Artist won the Battle and advanced to the Teamfights
Artist lost the Battle and was eliminated

Episode	Coach	Order	Winner(s)	Song	Loser(s)
Episode 10 (October 20)	Shirin	1	Kim Schutzius	"No Air"	Justyna Chaberek
Episode 10 (October 20)	Shirin	1	Kim Schutzius	"No Air"	Kevin Derbas
Episode 10 (October 20)	Giovanni	2	Lizi Gozalishvili	"Prisoner"	Nicole Scholz
Episode 10 (October 20)	Bill & Tom	3	Joel Marques Cunha	"Impossible"	N/A
Episode 10 (October 20)	Bill & Tom	3	Marc Altergott	"Impossible"	N/A
Episode 11 (October 21)	Ronan	1	Anne Mosters	"Hold Me Like You Used To"	Valentina Franco
Episode 11 (October 21)	Bill & Tom	2	Sebastian Zierof	"Because the Night"	Cäcilia Kubi
Episode 11 (October 21)	Shirin	3	Lorenz Haase	"Nein!"	N/A
Episode 11 (October 21)	Shirin	3	Finja Bernau	"Nein!"	N/A
Episode 11 (October 21)	Giovanni	4	Dan Mudd	"Senza una donna (Without a Woman)"	Charles Johnson
Episode 11 (October 21)	Ronan	5	N/A	"If the World Was Ending"	Lisa Christ
Episode 11 (October 21)	Ronan	5	N/A	"If the World Was Ending"	Oskar Jelitto
Episode 11 (October 21)	Giovanni	6	Laura Schopf	"The Joker and the Queen"	Thomas Schmidbauer
Episode 11 (October 21)	Ronan	7	Jaqueline Bloem	"Lady Marmalade"	Theresa Steininger
Episode 11 (October 21)	Bill & Tom	8	Alina Zamalieva	"The Phantom of the Opera"	N/A
Episode 11 (October 21)	Bill & Tom	8	Niclas Scholz	"The Phantom of the Opera"	N/A
Episode 12 (October 22)
Episode 12 (October 22)	Giovanni	1	Elias Biechele	"A Million Dreams"	N/A
Episode 12 (October 22)	Giovanni	1	Johann Bardowicks	"A Million Dreams"	N/A
Episode 12 (October 22)	Shirin	2	Linus Nehrig	"Best Part of Me"	N/A
Episode 12 (October 22)	Shirin	2	Joy Esquivias	"Best Part of Me"	N/A
Episode 12 (October 22)	Bill & Tom	3	N/A	"Für mich soll's rote Rosen regnen"	Angela Peltner
Episode 12 (October 22)	Bill & Tom	3	N/A	"Für mich soll's rote Rosen regnen"	Franziska Bittner
Episode 12 (October 22)	Giovanni	4	Sorlo Hoffmann	"Ein Lied kann eine Brücke sein"	Kevin Smith
Episode 12 (October 22)	Ronan	5	Simon Schmerbeck	"Rule the World"	Vikrant Subramanian
Episode 12 (October 22)	Shirin	6	Richard Vaupel	"I'm Not the Only One"	Luca Grace Kampmann
Episode 12 (October 22)	Ronan	7	N/A	"One"	Katharina Bongard & Arestak Babakyan
Episode 12 (October 22)	Ronan	7	N/A	"One"	Priti Pawar
Episode 12 (October 22)	Bill & Tom	8	Malou Lovis Kreyelkamp	"Everytime"	Luna Cavari
Episode 13 (November 2)	Shirin	1	Fritz Speck	"Komet"	Rouven Gruber
Episode 13 (November 2)	Ronan	2	Kimmy June	"I Don't Wanna Fight"	Annemarie Schmidt
Episode 13 (November 2)	Shirin	3	N/A	"Africa"	Chayane Coetzee
Episode 13 (November 2)	Shirin	3	N/A	"Africa"	Süleyman Atar
Episode 13 (November 2)	Bill & Tom	4	Naomi Mbiyeya	"Weinst Du"	Max Schrut
Episode 13 (November 2)	Ronan	5	Emely Myles	"Cake by the Ocean"	Felix Brückner & Kai Nötting
Episode 13 (November 2)	Bill & Tom	6	N/A	"Fast Car"	Sina Lecking
Episode 13 (November 2)	Bill & Tom	6	N/A	"Fast Car"	Felix Deeg
Episode 13 (November 2)	Ronan	7	Alex Seeger	"99 Luftballons"	N/A
Episode 13 (November 2)	Ronan	7	Anna Ebner	"99 Luftballons"	N/A
Episode 13 (November 2)	Giovanni	8	N/A	"Zusammen"	Marius Hof
Episode 13 (November 2)	Giovanni	8	N/A	"Zusammen"	Patrik Schmitt
Episode 14 (November 3)	Shirin	1	Danilo Timm	"Take On Me"	Moritz Steckenstein
Episode 14 (November 3)	Giovanni	2	N/A	"Why"	Lauren Mace
Episode 14 (November 3)	Giovanni	2	N/A	"Why"	Julia Szatmári
Episode 14 (November 3)	Bill & Tom	3	Philip Hoffmann	"Broken Strings"	Cemre Polat
Episode 14 (November 3)	Giovanni	4	Desirey Sarpong Agyemang	"Firework"	N/A
Episode 14 (November 3)	Giovanni	4	Carlotta Bach	"Firework"	N/A
Episode 14 (November 3)	Ronan	5	Susan Albers	"Bring Me to Life"	N/A
Episode 14 (November 3)	Ronan	5	Egon Herrnleben	"Bring Me to Life"	N/A
Episode 14 (November 3)	Bill & Tom	6	Tatjana Falkner	"Crush"	Kristin Witte
Episode 14 (November 3)	Shirin	7	Yang Ge	"Rich Girl"	Rudy Chopper
Episode 14 (November 3)	Giovanni	8	Impulso Tenors	"Time To Say Goodbye"	Anna Vichery

== Teamfights ==
The teamfights were recorded from 23 and 24 July 2023. It began broadcasting only by Sat.1 on Friday nights starting 10 November 2023. In this stage of the competition, a new mode was introduced: 12 artists appeared in each of three rounds. First, one artist per team sang and took a seat on one of four chairs called "hotseat". Once these seats were occupied, the next artist challenged one of the seated artists, and after the artists' performance, the studio audience decided who was allowed to take the seat. This process was repeated until all 12 had been performing. At the end of each episode, the 4 artists seated at the end of each episode, from any team, advanced to the semi-final. A coach had the possibility to lose all of their artists, or bring all of their artists to the semi-finals. However, every coach was represented in the semi-finals and every coach did not bring their entire team to the semi-finals after this round.

Teamfights color key
Artist was seated and advanced to the live shows
Artist was seated but was swapped and eliminated
Artist was not seated and was eliminated

Episode	Coach	Order	Artist	Song	Challenged Artist	Hotseat
Episode 15 (November 10)	Shirin	1	Yang Ge	"Poker Face"	—N/a	Put in Hot-seat 1
Episode 15 (November 10)	Giovanni	2	Carlotta Bach	"You Raise Me Up"	—N/a	Put in Hot-seat 2
Episode 15 (November 10)	Ronan	3	Jaqueline Bloem	"Not Fair"	—N/a	Put in Hot-seat 3
Episode 15 (November 10)	Bill + Tom	4	Alina Zamalieva	"Adagio g-Moll"	—N/a	Put in Hot-seat 4
Episode 15 (November 10)	Shirin	5	Joy Esquivias	"Chandelier"	Jaqueline Bloem	Put in Hot-seat 3
Episode 15 (November 10)	Giovanni	6	Dan Mudd	"Someone You Loved"	Yang Ge	Put in Hot-seat 1
Episode 15 (November 10)	Ronan	7	Simon Schmerbeck	"Falling"	Carlotta Bach	Put in Hot-seat 2
Episode 15 (November 10)	Bill + Tom	8	Philip Hoffman	"Tattoo"	Joy Esquivias	Eliminated
Episode 15 (November 10)	Shirin	9	Linus Nehrig	"Can I Be Him"	Dan Mudd	Eliminated
Episode 15 (November 10)	Giovanni	10	Desirey Sarpong Agyemang	"Flashlight"	Alina Zamalieva	Put in Hot-seat 4
Episode 15 (November 10)	Ronan	11	Egon Herrnleben	"Livin' On A Prayer"	Dan Mudd	Put in Hot-seat 1
Episode 15 (November 10)	Bill + Tom	12	Joel Marques Cunha	"Leave a Light On"	Simon Schmerbeck	Put in Hot-seat 2
Episode 16 (November 17)	Bill + Tom	1	Sebastian Zierof	"Music"	—N/a	Put in Hot-seat 1
Episode 16 (November 17)	Ronan	2	Emely Myles	"Respect"	—N/a	Put in Hot-seat 2
Episode 16 (November 17)	Giovanni	3	Laura Schopf	"Lost Without You"	—N/a	Put in Hot-seat 3
Episode 16 (November 17)	Shirin	4	Fritz Speck	"Meine Soldaten"	—N/a	Put in Hot-seat 4
Episode 16 (November 17)	Bill + Tom	5	Naomi Mbiyeya	"Spring Nicht"	Laura Schopf	Put in Hot-seat 3
Episode 16 (November 17)	Ronan	6	Alex Seeger	"All I Want"	Sebastian Zierof	Eliminated
Episode 16 (November 17)	Giovanni	7	Elias Biechele	"Say Something"	Fritz Speck	Put in Hot-seat 4
Episode 16 (November 17)	Shirin	8	Richard Vaupel	"Jealous"	Sebastian Zierof	Put in Hot-seat 1
Episode 16 (November 17)	Bill + Tom	9	Marc Altergott	"If I Ain't Got You"	Richard Vaupel	Put in Hot-seat 1
Episode 16 (November 17)	Ronan	10	Anne Mosters	"Reflection"	Marc Altergott	Eliminated
Episode 16 (November 17)	Giovanni	11	Impulso Tenors	"The Prayer"	Naomi Mbiyeya	Eliminated
Episode 16 (November 17)	Shirin	12	Kim Schutzius	"Easy on Me"	Elias Biechele	Put in Hot-seat 4
Episode 17 (November 24)	Shirin	1	Danilo Timm	"Ocean Eyes"	—N/a	Put in Hot-seat 1
Episode 17 (November 24)	Bill + Tom	2	Tatjana Falkner	"My Happy Ending"	—N/a	Put in Hot-seat 2
Episode 17 (November 24)	Giovanni	3	Lizi Gozalishvili	"Since U Been Gone"	—N/a	Put in Hot-seat 3
Episode 17 (November 24)	Ronan	4	Kimmy June	"Girl Crush"	—N/a	Put in Hot-seat 4
Episode 17 (November 24)	Shirin	5	Lorenz Haase	"Paradise"	Tatjana Falkner	Put in Hot-seat 2
Episode 17 (November 24)	Bill + Tom	6	Malou Lovis Kreyelkamp	"Don't Watch Me Cry"	Lizi Gozalishvili	Put in Hot-seat 3
Episode 17 (November 24)	Giovanni	7	Johann Bardowicks	"Fix You"	Kimmy June	Eliminated
Episode 17 (November 24)	Ronan	8	Anna Ebner	"Das Leichteste der Welt"	Danilo Timm	Eliminated
Episode 17 (November 24)	Shirin	9	Finja Bernau	"Verlierer"	Kimmy June	Put in Hot-seat 4
Episode 17 (November 24)	Bill + Tom	10	Niclas Scholz	"Human"	Lorenz Haase	Put in Hot-seat 2
Episode 17 (November 24)	Giovanni	11	Sorlo Hoffmann	"In diesem Moment"	Malou Lovis Kreyelkamp	Eliminated
Episode 17 (November 24)	Ronan	12	Susan Albers	"Skyscraper"	Niclas Scholz	Eliminated

Detailed chairs' changes
Episode	Order	Hotseat 1	Hotseat 2	Hotseat 3	Hotseat 4
Episode 15	4	Yang Ge	Carlotta Bach	Jaqueline Bloem	Alina Zamalieva
Episode 15	5	Yang Ge	Carlotta Bach	Joy Esquivias	Alina Zamalieva
Episode 15	6	Dan Mudd	Carlotta Bach	Joy Esquivias	Alina Zamalieva
Episode 15	7	Dan Mudd	Simon Schmerbeck	Joy Esquivias	Alina Zamalieva
Episode 15	8	Dan Mudd	Simon Schmerbeck	Joy Esquivias	Alina Zamalieva
Episode 15	9	Dan Mudd	Simon Schmerbeck	Joy Esquivias	Alina Zamalieva
Episode 15	10	Dan Mudd	Simon Schmerbeck	Joy Esquivias	Desirey Sarpong Agyemang
Episode 15	11	Egon Herrnleben	Simon Schmerbeck	Joy Esquivias	Desirey Sarpong Agyemang
Episode 15	12	Egon Herrnleben	Joel Marques Cunha	Joy Esquivias	Desirey Sarpong Agyemang
Episode 16	4	Sebastian Zierof	Emely Myles	Laura Schopf	Fritz Speck
Episode 16	5	Sebastian Zierof	Emely Myles	Naomi Mbiyeya	Fritz Speck
Episode 16	6	Sebastian Zierof	Emely Myles	Naomi Mbiyeya	Fritz Speck
Episode 16	7	Sebastian Zierof	Emely Myles	Naomi Mbiyeya	Elias Biechele
Episode 16	8	Richard Vaupel	Emely Myles	Naomi Mbiyeya	Elias Biechele
Episode 16	9	Marc Altergott	Emely Myles	Naomi Mbiyeya	Elias Biechele
Episode 16	10	Marc Altergott	Emely Myles	Naomi Mbiyeya	Elias Biechele
Episode 16	11	Marc Altergott	Emely Myles	Naomi Mbiyeya	Elias Biechele
Episode 16	12	Marc Altergott	Emely Myles	Naomi Mbiyeya	Kim Schutzius
Episode 17	4	Danilo Timm	Tatjana Falkner	Lizi Gozalishvili	Kimmy June
Episode 17	5	Danilo Timm	Lorenz Haase	Lizi Gozalishvili	Kimmy June
Episode 17	6	Danilo Timm	Lorenz Haase	Malou Lovis Kreyelkamp	Kimmy June
Episode 17	7	Danilo Timm	Lorenz Haase	Malou Lovis Kreyelkamp	Kimmy June
Episode 17	8	Danilo Timm	Lorenz Haase	Malou Lovis Kreyelkamp	Kimmy June
Episode 17	9	Danilo Timm	Lorenz Haase	Malou Lovis Kreyelkamp	Finja Bernau
Episode 17	10	Danilo Timm	Niclas Scholz	Malou Lovis Kreyelkamp	Finja Bernau
Episode 17	11	Danilo Timm	Niclas Scholz	Malou Lovis Kreyelkamp	Finja Bernau
Episode 17	12	Danilo Timm	Niclas Scholz	Malou Lovis Kreyelkamp	Finja Bernau

== Semi-final ==
The semi-final aired on 1 December. All decisions are made by television viewers via televoting. Due to the teamfights round prior to the semi-finals, this season is the first to feature an uneven amount of artists from each team entering the semi-finals: Team Giovanni has one artist, Team Ronan has two, Team Shirin has four, and Team Bill & Tom has five. Unlike the previous season, this season featured 5 finalists once again.

The winner of the spin-off series The Voice Rap, Leon "Ezo" Weick, who is coached by Kool Savas, also competed in the semi-finals. Weick previously made it to the Sing-off in the 10th season of The Voice of Germany in 2020 on Team Nico.

Due to votes being solely for the artist, it was not guaranteed that each coach would be represented in the finale. However, all four main coaches successfully brought their team to the finale. Ronan Keating, with the advancements of Egon Herrnleben and Emely Myles, became the third coach to successfully bring two artists to the finale in the history of the show. However, with the elimination of Leon "Ezo" Weick, Kool Savas no longer had an artist on his team, marking the first instance since season 5 that not all coaches are represented in the finale.

To start off the semi-final, the semi-finalists performed with Michael Schulte, singing "Waterfall".

Semi-final color key
Artist was advanced to the finale from the public's vote
Artist was eliminated

Semi-final results
Order	Coach	Artist	Song	Result
1	Bill & Tom	Joel Marques Cunha	"Drops of Jupiter (Tell Me)"	Eliminated
2	Ronan	Egon Herrnleben	"Don't Stop Believin'"	Advanced
3	Shirin	Kim Schutzius	"Bleeding Love"	Eliminated
4	Kool Savas	Leon "Ezo" Weick	"Astronaut"	Eliminated
5	Shirin	Joy Esquivias	"Grenade"	Advanced
6	Bill & Tom	Naomi Mbiyeya	"Fragen Fragen Fragen"	Eliminated
7	Shirin	Danilo Timm	"Grace Kelly"	Eliminated
8	Bill & Tom	Marc Altergott	"Stop and Stare"	Eliminated
9	Giovanni	Desirey Sarpong Agyemang	"Fallin'"	Advanced
10	Shirin	Finja Bernau	"Lila Wolken"	Eliminated
11	Ronan	Emely Myers	"I'll Never Love Again"	Advanced
12	Bill & Tom	Niclas Scholz	"I Want It All"	Eliminated
13	Bill & Tom	Malou Lovis Kryvelkamp	"People Help the People"	Advanced

== Finale ==
The finale aired on 8 December. Unlike the previous season, this season featured five finalists once again who competed for the public's vote to be declared the winner of the season.

The show invited famous singer-songwriters including season 9-11 coach Nico Santos, Giant Rooks, James Blunt, Emeli Sandé, and Joy Denalane to duet with the finalists. Former coach Rea Garvey performed his song "Perfect in My Eyes" with the finalists at the start of the show.

Malou Lovis Kreyelkamp from Team Bill & Tom won the season, marking Bill & Tom Kaulitz's first win as coaches. Bill & Tom also became the sixth new coach to win on their first season, following Max Herre in season 3, Michi Beck & Smudo in season 4, Michael Patrick Kelly in season 8, Alice Merton in season 9, and Johannes Oerding in season 11.

Coach	Artist	Order	Original Song	Order	Duet Song (with special guest)	Voting	Result
Giovanni Zarrella	Desirey Sarpong Agyemang	1	"Break of Day"	8	"Number 1" (with Nico Santos)	20,24%	Runner-up
Ronan Keating	Egon Herrnleben	6	"Monsters"	2	"Somebody Like You" (with Giant Rooks)	18,75%	3rd Place
Bill & Tom Kaulitz	Malou Lovis Kreyelkamp	3	"Glacier Rivers"	9	"All the Love That I Ever Needed" (with James Blunt)	28,62%	Winner
Shirin David	Joy Esquivias	7	"Promenade"	4	"All This Love" (with Emeli Sandé)	18,15%	4th Place
Ronan Keating	Emely Myles	10	"We Got This"	5	"Happy" (with Joy Denalane)	14,25%	5th Place

== Elimination Chart ==
Coaches color key

- Artist from Team Giovanni
- Artist from Team Bill & Tom
- Artist from Team Shirin
- Artist from Team Ronan
- Artist from Team Kool Savas

Results color key

- Winner
- Runner-up
- Third place
- Fourth place
- Fifth place
- Artist was saved by the public vote
- Artist was eliminated

Overall Results
Artist	Week 1 Semi-Final	Week 2 Final
Malou Lovis Kreyelkamp	Safe	Winner
Desirey Sarpong Agyemang	Safe	Runner-up
Egon Herrnleben	Safe	3rd Place
Joy Esquivias	Safe	4th Place
Emely Myles	Safe	5th Place
Marc Altergott	Eliminated	Eliminated (Semi-Final)
Finja Bernau	Eliminated	Eliminated (Semi-Final)
Joel Marques Cunha	Eliminated	Eliminated (Semi-Final)
Naomi Mbiyeya	Eliminated	Eliminated (Semi-Final)
Niclas Scholz	Eliminated	Eliminated (Semi-Final)
Kim Schutzius	Eliminated	Eliminated (Semi-Final)
Danilo Timm	Eliminated	Eliminated (Semi-Final)
Leon "Ezo" Weick	Eliminated	Eliminated (Semi-Final)
