= Gleisdreieck =

Gleisdreieck (literally meaning triangle of rails in German) may refer to:

- Gleisdreieck (Berlin U-Bahn), a U-Bahn station in the city of Berlin in Germany
- Gleisdreieck (Bochum), a district of the city of Bochum in North Rhine-Westphalia, Germany
- Gleisdreieck (album), a 2017 album by recording artist Joy Denalane
- Wye (rail), a type of railway junction comprising a triangle of rails
- Dangerous Crossing (1937 film), a German drama film
