= Willpower (Joy Denalane album) =

Studio album by Joy Denalane
- Released: October 6, 2023
- Length: 42:44
- Language: English
- Label: Lesedi; Four
- Producer: Roberto Di Gioia; Max Herre; Shuko

Joy Denalane chronology
Let Yourself Be Loved (2020)	Willpower (2023)

Singles from Willpower
- 1. "Hideaway" Released: August 4, 2023; 2. "Happy" Released: September 15, 2023; 3. "Fly By" Released: October 4, 2023

Willpower is the sixth studio album by German singer Joy Denalane. It was released by Lesedi Music in association with Four Music on October 6, 2023.

== Critical reception ==
Professional ratings
Review scores
Source	Rating
Laut.de	4/5 stars

Laut.de editor Philipp Kause called the album a "great record" and noted: "In a few years the release will be seen as a strong milestone." Andrian Kreye, writing for Süddeutsche Zeitung, wrote that "on her new album Willpower, singer Joy Denalane collapses the space-time of pop. Wonderful." Westdeutscher Rundfunk critic Marc Mühlenbrock found that "Denalane remains true to her great love for the soul of bygone eras, but travels a decade further in the time machine: after the sound of the late 60s, it is now the turn of the late 70s. Her band and her voice also master this sound vision skillfully."

== Chart performance ==
Willpower debuted and peaked at number 33 on the German Albums Chart for the week of October 13, 2023. It became Denalane's lowest-charting album yet as well as her first album to miss the top ten in Germany.

== Track listing ==
Willpower track listing
No.	Title	Writer(s)	Length
1.	"Can't We Smile"	Denalane; Fonce Mizell; Larry Mizell; Sekou Neblett	2:53
2.	"Fly By"	Denalane; Max Herre; Roberto Di Gioia; Sway Clarke	3:21
3.	"I Believe" (featuring Ghostface Killah)	Denalane; Dennis Coles; Di Gioia; Clarke	3:42
4.	"Hideaway"	Denalane; Coles; Di Gioia; Clarke	4:19
5.	"Revolutions"	Denalane; Herre; Di Gioia; Neblett	4:14
6.	"Far Cry"	Denalane; Di Gioia; Neblett	2:35
7.	"Good Times Better"	Denalane; Alan Freeman; Derek Moore; Ron Howden; Roye Terrence Albrighton; Neblett	4:04
8.	"All of Me"	Denalane; Herre; Di Gioia; Neblett	3:36
9.	"By Heart"	Denalane; Herre; Di Gioia; Neblett	3:47
10.	"Willpower"	Denalane; Di Gioia; Neblett	3:36
11.	"True (Soweto)"	Denalane; Di Gioia; Clarke	3:33
12.	"Happy"	Denalane; Di Gioia; Clarke	2:57
Total length:			42:44

== Charts ==
Chart performance for Willpower
Chart (2023)	Peak position
German Albums (Offizielle Top 100)	33

== Release history ==
Willpower release history
Region	Date	Format(s)	Label	Ref.
Various	October 6, 2023	CD; digital download; streaming; vinyl	Lesedi; Four Music	
