= Maureen (album) =

Studio album by Joy Denalane
- Released: May 20, 2011
- Length: 47:45
- Label: Nesola; Four
- Producer: Anthony Bell; Paul "Gooch" Cantor; Max Herre; Kahedi; Steve Mckie

Joy Denalane chronology
The Dresden Soul Symphony (2008)	Maureen (2011)	Gleisdreieck (2017)

Maureen is the third studio album by German recording artist Joy Denalane. It was released by Nesola Records and Four Music on May 20, 2011, in German-speaking Europe. Her first German-language studio album since Mamani (2002), it takes its title from Denalane's middle name. Incorporating neo soul, R&B and hip hop styles, it features production and songwriting credits from Steve McKie, Anthony Bell, Kahedi, Paul "Gooch" Cantor, Bilal and Denalane's husband Max Herre.

Upon its release, Maureen earned a mixed response from critics who complimented its production but found that the album lacked depth. On the charts, it debuted number eight on the German Albums Chart. Elsewhere, the album peaked at number thirty-six in Austria and number eleven on the Swiss Albums Chart. Spawning four singles, including lead single "Niemand (Was wir nicht tun)," an English language version of Maureen was released in March 2012.

== Critical reception ==
Professional ratings
Review scores
Source	Rating
Laut.de	3/5 stars
Plattentests.de	6/10
Rolling Stone	2.5/5 stars

Maureen earned generally mixed reviews from music critics. Laut.de editor Mara Wecker rated the album three stars out of five and noted that Maureen was "a bit more pop" than Denalane's previous albums. She concluded that "even if there is objectively nothing wrong with this record, the spark in the overall package doesn't really jump over. The rawness and rawness that made Joy Denalane so stunning from the start only comes through in certain places." Frank Lähnemann from the German edition of Rolling Stone praised the album's technical as well as Denalane's vocal performance on Maureen but noted that the album left him "unemotional," writing: "Here I only feel cold and strangeness, as if I were leafing through the advice pages of Cosmopolitan." Plattentests.de called the album a "logical consequence of her two previous albums: The modernity of classic soul."

== Track listing ==
Maureen track listing
No.	Title	Writer(s)	Producer(s)	Length
1.	"Niemand (was wir nicht tun)"	Max Herre; Sékou Neblett; Denalane; Samon Kawamura; Roberto Di Gioia	Kahedi	3:11
2.	"Frei"	Herre; Neblett; Denalane; Kawamura; Di Gioia	Kahedi	4:36
3.	"Der Tag ist nah"	Herre; Baris Aladag; Bilal Oliver; Conley Whitfield	Steve McKie	4:04
4.	"Nie wieder, nie mehr" (featuring Bilal)	Curtis Mayfield; Herre; Neblett; Denalane; Jacob Dutton; Aladag; Gregory Fowler; Clearance Burke Jr.	Kahedi	3:30
5.	"Bin und bleib dein"	Herre; Neblett; Denalane; Aladag; Anthony Bell	Bell	4:13
6.	"Wo wollen wir hin von hier?"	Herre; Neblett; Denalane; R. Taylor; Sylvia Robinson; Bert Keyes; McKie; Aladag	McKie	4:27
7.	"Siehst du mich"	Herre; Neblett; Denalane; McKie; Aladag	McKie	5:00
8.	"Lass es Liebe sein"	Herre; Neblett; Denalane; McKie; Aladag; Dan Raaf	McKie; Raaf^{[a]}	4:31
9.	"Happiness"	Johnnie James Wilder Jr.	McKie	4:27
10.	"Rosen"	Herre; Neblett; Denalane; Kawamura; Di Gioia	Kahedi	3:41
11.	"Du allein"	Herre; Neblett; Denalane; Aladag; Paul Cantor; Barry White	Paul "Gooch" Cantor	2:56
12.	"Mehr als wir"	Herre; Neblett; Denalane; McKie; Aladag	McKie	4:11
Total length:				47:45

Sample credits

- ^{^[a]} denotes additional producer

== Charts ==
Chart performance for Maureen
Chart (2011)	Peak position
Austrian Albums (Ö3 Austria)	36
German Albums (Offizielle Top 100)	8
Swiss Albums (Schweizer Hitparade)	11

== Release history ==
Maureen release history
Region	Date	Edition(s)	Format(s)	Label	Ref.
Various	May 20, 2012	German language version	CD; digital download; streaming	Nesola; Four	
Various	March 20, 2013	English language version	CD; digital download; streaming	Nesola; Four	
