= Born & Raised (Joy Denalane album) =

Studio album by Joy Denalane
- Released: August 11, 2006
- Length: 65:04
- Language: English
- Label: Nesola; Four Music; Sony
- Producer: BAB Garde; Max Herre; Tom Krüger; Franc Kuruc; No I.D.; Jake One; Don Phillipe; Timmy W.

Joy Denalane chronology
Mamani Live (2004)	Born & Raised (2006)	The Dresden Soul Symphony (2008)

Born & Raised is the second studio album by German recording artist Joy Denalane. Her first English-language album, it was released by Nesola Records and Four Music on August 11, 2006 in German-speaking Europe, featuring production by No I.D., Jake One, BAB Gardeat and executive producer Max Herre. American rappers Lupe Fiasco, Raekwon and Governor appear as guest vocalists on the album.

The album was released to universal acclaim. It reached number 2 on the German Albums Chart and entered the top five in Switzerland. In Germany, Born & Raised was eventually certified Gold by the Bundesverband Musikindustrie (BVMI). Denalane's highest-charting record to date, it spawned four singles, including "Let Go", Raekwon-cover "Heaven or Hell", "Sometimes Love" and "Change".

== Critical reception ==
Professional ratings
Review scores
Source	Rating
About.com	4.5/5 stars
CDStarts	8.5/10
Laut.de	4/5 stars
The Situation	4.5/5 stars

Laut.de editor Alexander Engelen noted that you "couldn't blame the album if it achieved no commercial success" in the United States." He found that Denalane, Herre and "their team did a good job on that. But one must not forget that Madame Denalane is traveling on unknown paths. No German soul singer has made the leap to America before her. However, no one has ever been this close to the dream." Mark Edward Nero from About.com felt that "anyone who grew up on the party music of the last decade might not like or not understand Born & Raised. But anyone who's a fan of Amel Larrieux or Alicia Keys would probably enjoy this CD."

BBC Music critic Ilka Schlockermann complimented the album for its mixture of "real soul songs, strong production and a confident, strong voice." She wrote that "whether Joy’s name is widely enough known to make the cross-over remains to be seen, but on this evidence she has what it takes. Born & Raised pushes all the right R&B buttons. But you can't help but think that the best is yet to come for someone this talented." Melisa Tang, writing for The Situation called the album "an astoundingly good album. She further described it as a "breath of fresh air. [Denalane's] love and devotion to her art is obvious through her music."

== Track listing ==
Born & Raised track listing
No.	Title	Writer(s)	Producer(s)	Length
1.	"Change" (featuring Lupe Fiasco)	Curtis Mayfield; Max Herre; Sékou Neblett; Joy Denalane; B. Krass; W. Muhammad Jaco	No I.D.	4:18
2.	"Let Go"	Lewis; Herre; Neblett; Denalane; Buster Poindexter; Jackie Members	Jake One	4:32
3.	"Be Real"	Herre; Neblett; Anthony Tidd; Denalane	Herre	4:16
4.	"Heaven or Hell" (featuring Raekwon)	Herre; Neblett; Denalane; Randle; Corey Woods; Alex Zanetis	Herre	4:35
5.	"One in a Million"	Herre; Neblett; Denalane; Benjamin Wright	Hassan Annouri; Richard James Moore	3:46
6.	"For the Love"	Herre; Neblett; Denalane; James W. Alexander; W. Hutchinson	Paul "Gooch" Cantor	4:07
7.	"7 Year Itch"	Herre; Neblett; Denalane; Chris Sholar; A.L. Barret	Chris Sholar	5:00
8.	"Caught Up"	Herre; Neblett; Tidd; Denalane; J. Glaser; T. Glaser	Herre; Tidd	3:31
9.	"Stranger in This Land"	Herre; Neblett; Denalane	Herre	5:38
10.	"Start Over"	Herre; Neblett; Denalane	Herre	4:02
11.	"Born & Raised"	Herre; Neblett; Denalane; Ernest Wilson	No I.D.	4:08
12.	"Something Stirrin' Up" (featuring Governor)	Norman Whitfield	SaschliQ	5:50
13.	"Despite It All"	Herre; Neblett; Tidd; Melvin Lewis; Denalane; M. Mathews; Jean-Baptiste Kouame	Noizetrip	3:53
14.	"Soweto '76 – '06"	Michael Wagener; Herre; Neblett; Denalane; Phillip Lehman; Gabriel Roth	Herre	4:55
15.	"Sometimes Love"	Herre; Neblett; Denalane; A.L. Barret	Herre; Josh David	3:11
Total length:				65:04

Born & Raised – Japanese edition
No.	Title	Writer(s)	Producer(s)	Length
16.	"Let Go (Teka One Drop RMX)" (featuring Jah Mason)	Lewis; Herre; Neblett; Denalane; Poindexter; Members	Jake One; Teka^{[a]}	4:43
17.	"Heaven or Hell (Samon Kawamura RMX)" (featuring Raekwon)	Herre; Neblett; Denalane; Randle; Woods; Zanetis	Herre; Samon Kawamura^{[a]}	4:48

Notes

- ^{^[a]} denotes additional producer

Sample credits

- "Change" contains an interlopation of "I Want to Go Back" originally recorded by The Impressions.
- "Let Go" contains an interlopation of "Love Gonna Pack Up" originally recorded by Sly, Slick and Wicked.
- "Heaven or Hell" contains an interpolation of "I Hate I Walked Away" originally recorded by Syl Johnson.
- "One in a Million" contains an interpolation of "I Can't Go On Living Without You" originally recorded by Tavares.
- "For the Love" contains an interpolation of "Together Let's Find Love" originally recorded by The 5th Dimension.
- "Caught Up" contains an interpolation of "Let Me Down Easy" originally recorded by Bettye LaVette.
- "Something Stirrin' Up" contains an interpolation of "Crying" originally recorded by Rose Royce for the soundtrack of Car Wash (1976).
- "Soweto '76 – '06" contains an interpolation of "Eltsuhg Ibal Lasiti" originally by The Daktaris.

== Credits and personnel ==
- Dan Abitol — violin
- Odile Biard — violin
- Felix Borel — violin
- Ian Cumming — trombone
- Kathrin Distler — cello
- Andreas Fischer — viola
- Klaus Graf — saxophone
- Michael Kedaisch — marimba
- Franc Kuruc — guitar
- Tom Krüger — bass
- Dalma Lima — percussion
- Klaus Graf — saxophone
- Max Herre — executive producer
- Chiwoniso Maraire — mbira
- Klaus Marquardt — violin
- Claudia Pfister — violin
- Don Phillipe — wurlitzer
- Raphael Sacha — viola
- Christoph Sauer — bass
- Violina Sauleva — viola
- Lillo Scrimali — piano, organ, synthesizer
- Tim Ströble — cello
- Sebastian Studinitzky — horn
- Myriam Trück — violin
- Matthias Trück — cello
- Tommy W. — drums

== Charts ==
=== Weekly charts ===
Weekly chart performance for Born & Raised
Chart (2006–2007)	Peak position
Austrian Albums (Ö3 Austria)	42
French Albums (SNEP)	86
German Albums (Offizielle Top 100)	2
Swiss Albums (Schweizer Hitparade)	5
UK Independent Albums (OCC)	48

=== Year-end charts ===
Year-end chart performance for Born & Raised
Chart (2006)	Position
German Albums (Offizielle Top 100)	96

== Certifications ==
Certifications for Born & Raised
Region	Certification	Certified units/sales
Germany (BVMI)	Gold	100,000^{‡}
^{‡} Sales+streaming figures based on certification alone.
