= Chiwoniso Maraire =

Zimbabwean singer and songwriter (1976–2013)

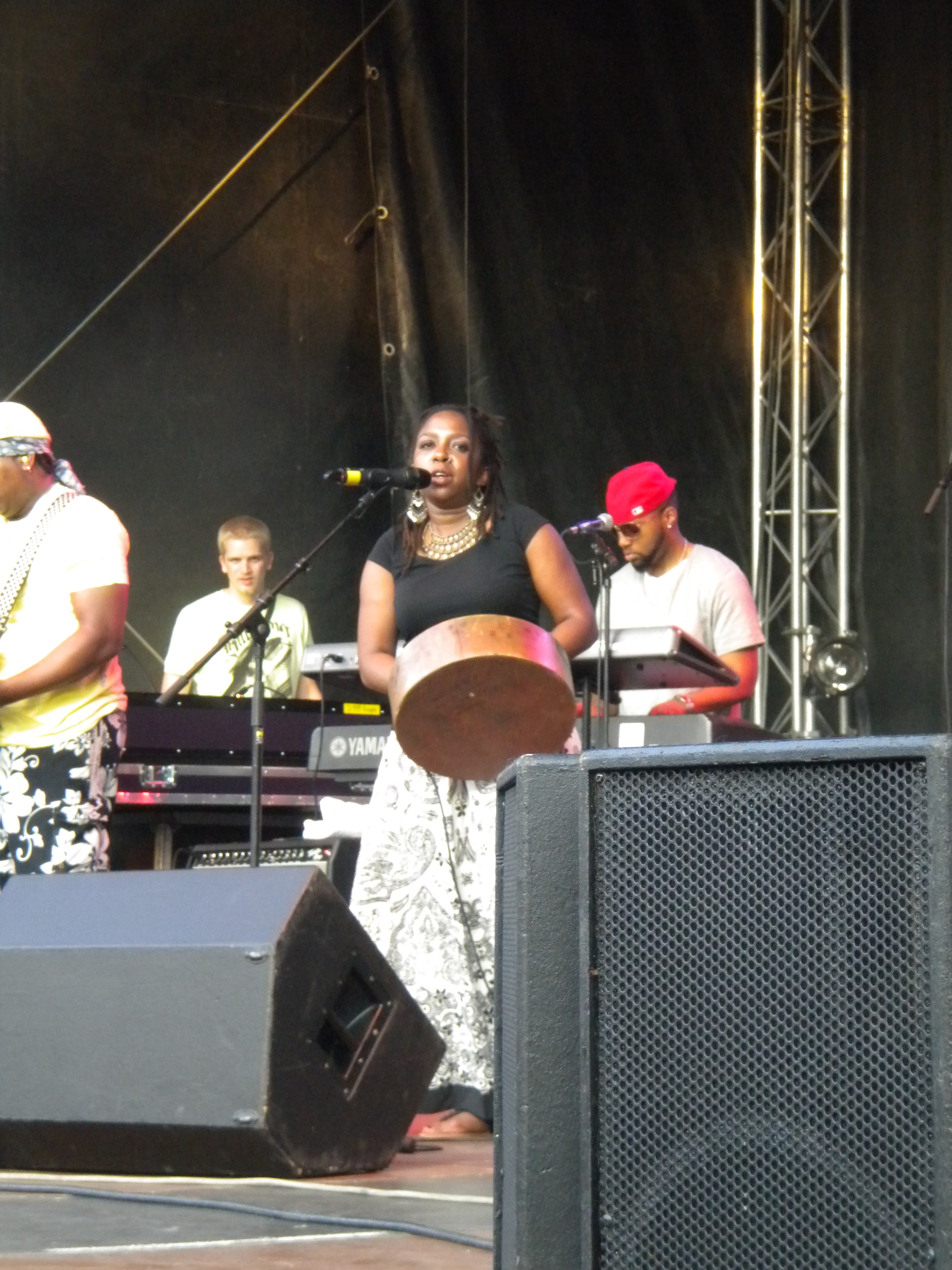
- Chiwoniso Maraire in 2009

Background information
- Also known as: Chiwoniso
- Born: March 5, 1976; Olympia, Washington, United States
- Died: July 24, 2013 (aged 37) Chitungwiza, Zimbabwe
- Genres: Chimurenga; worldbeat; mbira
- Instruments: voice; mbira; percussion
- Years active: 1995-2013

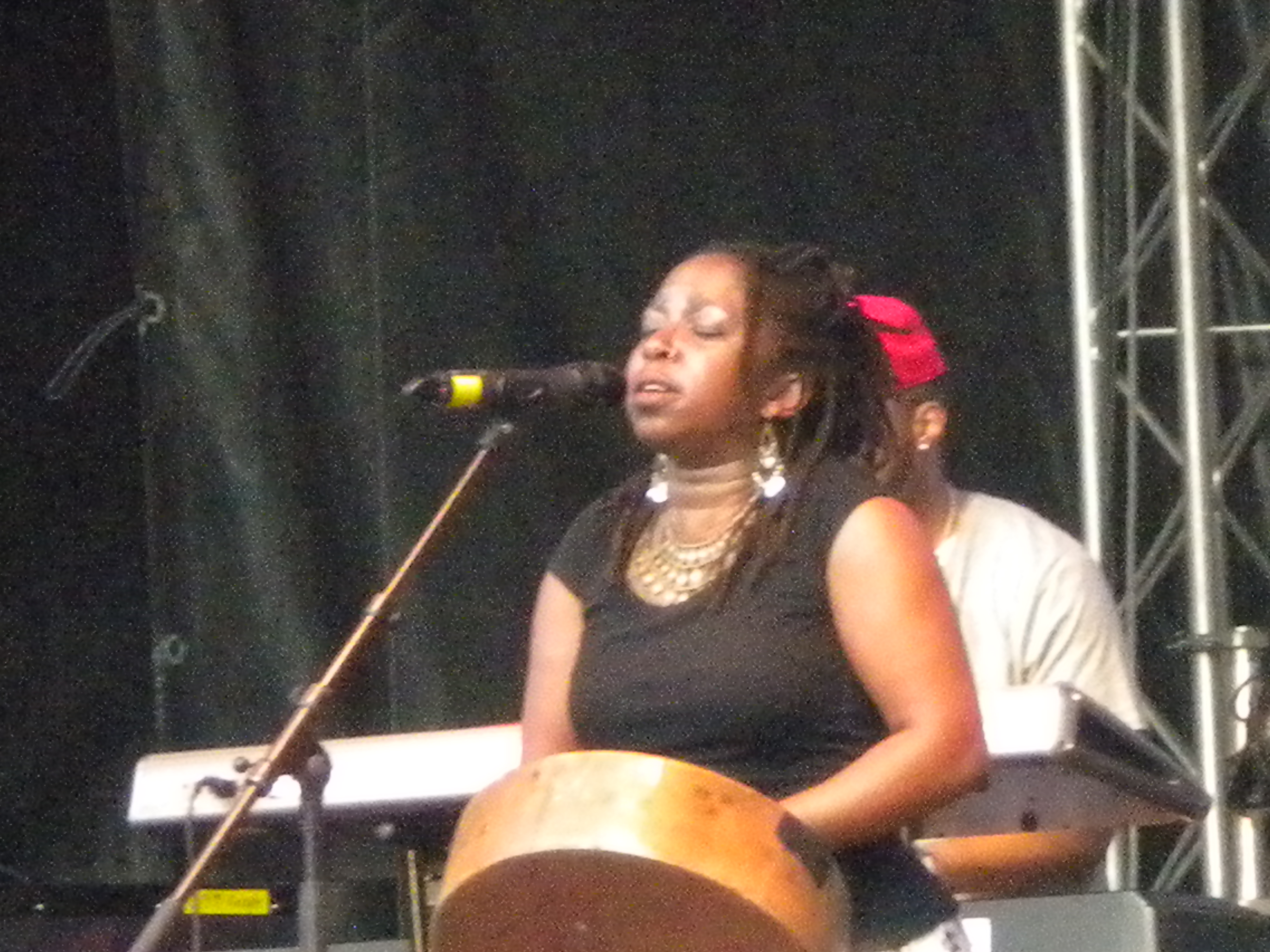
Chiwoniso Maraire in performance

Chiwoniso Maraire (5 March 1976 – 24 July 2013) was a Zimbabwean singer, songwriter, and exponent of Zimbabwean mbira music. She was the daughter of Zimbabwean mbira master and teacher Dumisani Maraire (and former officer in the Zimbabwe Ministry of Sports and Culture in the early 1980s). Describing the mbira, an instrument traditionally used by male musicians, she said, "It is like a large xylophone. It is everywhere in Africa under different names: sanza, kalimba, etc. For us in Zimbabwe it is the name for many string instruments. There are many kinds of mbiras. The one that I play is called the nyunga nyunga, which means sparkle-sparkle."

== Biography ==
Maraire was born in 1976 in Olympia, Washington, where her father had moved his family. Maraire spent the first seven years of her life in the United States. She spent a portion of her high school years attending The Northwest School in Seattle, Washington. When she moved back to Zimbabwe, she attended Mutare Girls' High School and took evening classes at the University of Zimbabwe, where her father was teaching.

In the early 1990s, when she was 15, she formed part of the Afro-fusion hip-hop trio A Peace of Ebony, which "was perhaps the first group to fuse mbira with contemporary beats". In 1996, she joined The Storm, a band led by guitarist Andy Brown (who later became her husband): "The Storm became one of Zimbabwe's biggest bands, touring the world and winning accolades.... Maraire's firm voice and Brown's plucky guitar made a beautiful combination."

Chiwoniso fronted her acoustic group Chiwoniso & Vibe Culture for several years. Her first album, Ancient Voices, was released to international acclaim in 1998. In 1998, she toured West Africa and Europe with fellow mbira player, Kurai Mubaiwa, serving as the opening act for Cape Verdean singer-songwriter Cesária Évora.

Chiwoniso went on to record three more albums: Timeless (2004), Hupenyu Kumusha, Life at Home, Impilo Ekhaya. The Collaboration: Volume 1 (2006), and Rebel Woman (2008). From 2001 to 2004, she was also a core member of the multinational all-women band Women's Voice, whose original members hailed from Norway, Zimbabwe, Tanzania, the United States, Israel, and Algeria. Chiwoniso also starred in film, having worked on the soundtracks for movies and documentaries by an array of Zimbabwean writers and film producers in the last ten years. She made her last recording in March 2013, and "Zvichapera", a cover of Thomas Mapfumo's song, was released posthumously in 2015.

== Speaking out against police brutality ==
She said, "To beat people, to threaten people, to put a person in a situation where they have to think for the next five hours about whether or not they are going to be okay — is a very, very bad thing to do."

== Death and suicide of daughter ==
Maraire died on 24 July, 2013, at South Medical Hospital in Chitungwiza, Zimbabwe, aged 37. According to her manager Cosmas Zamangwe, she had been admitted to hospital 10 days earlier suffering from chest pains. The cause of death was the result of suspected pneumonia, just a year after the death of her ex-husband, Andy Brown, also a prominent musician. The couple left behind two daughters, Chengeto and Chiedza. She was buried at her rural home in Chakohwa village in Mutambara.

On 12 September 2015, the younger of her daughters, 15 year old Chiedza Brown, died by suicide. Chiedza was also a musician in the Mbira tradition like her mother and an accomplished singer. The last surviving member of Maraire's family with Andy Brown is her daughter, Chengeto, although Andy Brown had other children, the step-siblings of Maraire's daughters.

== Awards and honours ==
Chiwoniso was honoured by Radio France ("Decouverte Afrique") for her debut album, Ancient Voices (1998), and was nominated in the Kora All-Africa Music Awards for best female vocals of Africa in 1999. The album entered the World Music Charts Europe three times.

== Discography ==
=== Albums ===
- A Piece of Ebony: From the Native Tongue (1992)
- Ancient Voices (1998)
- Chiwoniso & Vibe Culture: Timeless (2004)
- The Collaboration: Hupenyu Kumusha/Life at Home/Impilo Ekhaya. Volume 1 (2006)
- Rebel Woman (2008)

=== Singles ===
- "Zvichapera" (released posthumously 2015)

=== Spurious/Untraced ===
- "Woman of the Well"
- "Return Great Spirit" (alternative version to the one on Timeless)

=== Also appears on ===
- Everyone's Child: tracks 1, 15 and 17 (soundtrack, 1996)
- Andy Brown and The Storm: Hondo Ye Sadza (2000)
- Joy Denalane: Mamani (2002)
- Andy Brown and The Storm: Passage of Time (2003)
- Women Care with Marie Daulne, Talike, Anneli Drecker and others (2005)
- Tanyaradzwa (soundtrack, 2006)
- Trio Ivoire: Across the Ocean (2009)
- with Mari Boine and others: Make Me A Channel Of Your Peace - The Nobel Peace Prize 100 years (2010)
- Max Wild: Tamba (2010)
- Antonio Forcione: Sketches of Africa (2012)

=== Featured by ===
- Outspoken Tha Humble Neophyte: "The Heavens And The Skies"
- Jah Prayzah: "Dande"

=== Compilations ===
- Women Care (2005) - "African Woman", "A Mother To Them All (African Woman 2)", "A Song For A Modern Woman"
- Putumayo Kids: African Dreamland (2008) - "Usacheme"
- Hear Globally: A Cumbancha Collection (2009) - "Vanorapa", "Woman of the Well"
- Listen To The Banned (2010) - "Rebel Woman"
- Positive Generation (2011) - "Galgal Hatzila (The Lifeline)" with David Broza and the Jimila Choir
