= The Dresden Soul Symphony (album) =

Live album by MDR Symphony Orchestra featuring Joy Denalane, Bilal, Dwele and Tweet
- Released: October 24, 2008
- Recorded: April 26–27, 2008
- Venue: Alter Schlachthof (Dresden, Germany)
- Genre: Soul; R&B; classical; funk; pop; disco
- Label: Four Music Productions

Joy Denalane chronology
Born & Raised (2006)	The Dresden Soul Symphony (2008)	Maureen (2011)

Bilal chronology
1st Born Second (2001)	The Dresden Soul Symphony (2008)	Airtight's Revenge (2010)

Dwele chronology
Sketches of a Man (2008)	The Dresden Soul Symphony (2008)	Dwele (2009)

Tweet chronology
It's Me Again (2005)	The Dresden Soul Symphony (2008)	Simply Tweet EP (2013)

The Dresden Soul Symphony is a live album by The Dresden Soul Symphony, released October 24, 2008. The musicians reinterpret soul hits and combine them with classical music. The musical ensemble includes vocals from Joy Denalane, Bilal, Dwele and Tweet, the MDR Symphony Orchestra and conducted by Jun Märkl.

== Track listing ==
1. "Prelude" - 3:39
2. "Midnight Train to Georgia" - 3:57
  - Joy Denalane, Bilal, Dwele and Tweet
3. "I Thank You" - 2:16
  - Bilal and Dwele
4. "Take Me to the River" - 2:53
  - Dwele
5. "(You Make Me Feel Like) A Natural Woman" - 3:08
  - Joy Denalane
6. "I Got a Woman" - 2:33
  - Bilal
7. "Lovin' You" - 3:51
  - Tweet
8. "Midnight Train to Georgia (Reprise)" - 1:15
  - Joy Denalane, Bilal, Dwele and Tweet
9. "I'm Coming Out" - 1:40
10. "A Song for You" - 1:40
  - Joy Denalane
11. "You're All I Need to Get By" - 3:18
  - Joy Denalane and Bilal
12. "Let's Stay Together" - 2:22
  - Dwele
13. "It's a Man's Man's Man's World" - 2:08
  - Joy Denalane and Tweet
14. "Me and Mrs. Jones" - 3:12
  - Dwele
15. "Betcha by Golly Wow!" - 3:48
  - Tweet
16. "I'll Take You There" - 2:47
  - Tweet and Dwele
17. "ABC" - 2:30
  - Joy Denalane, Bilal, Dwele and Tweet
18. "Sir Duke" - 2:43
  - Bilal
19. "Everything Is Everything" - 3:00
  - Joy Denalane
20. "Prelude Reprise" - 2:28
21. "Master Blaster" - 2:55
  - Bilal
22. "Love's Theme" - 2:12
23. "T.S.O.P." - 1:54
24. "Love Train" - 2:30
  - Bilal
25. "Ain't No Stoppin' Us Now" - 3:16
  - Joy Denalane, Bilal, Dwele and Tweet
26. "Midnight Train to Georgia (Finale)" - 2:53
  - Joy Denalane, Bilal, Dwele and Tweet

== Personnel ==
- Joy Denalane - vocals
- Bilal - vocals
- Dwele - vocals
- Tweet - vocals
- MDR Symphony Orchestra
- Jun Märkl - conductor
