= Lance Butters =

German rapper

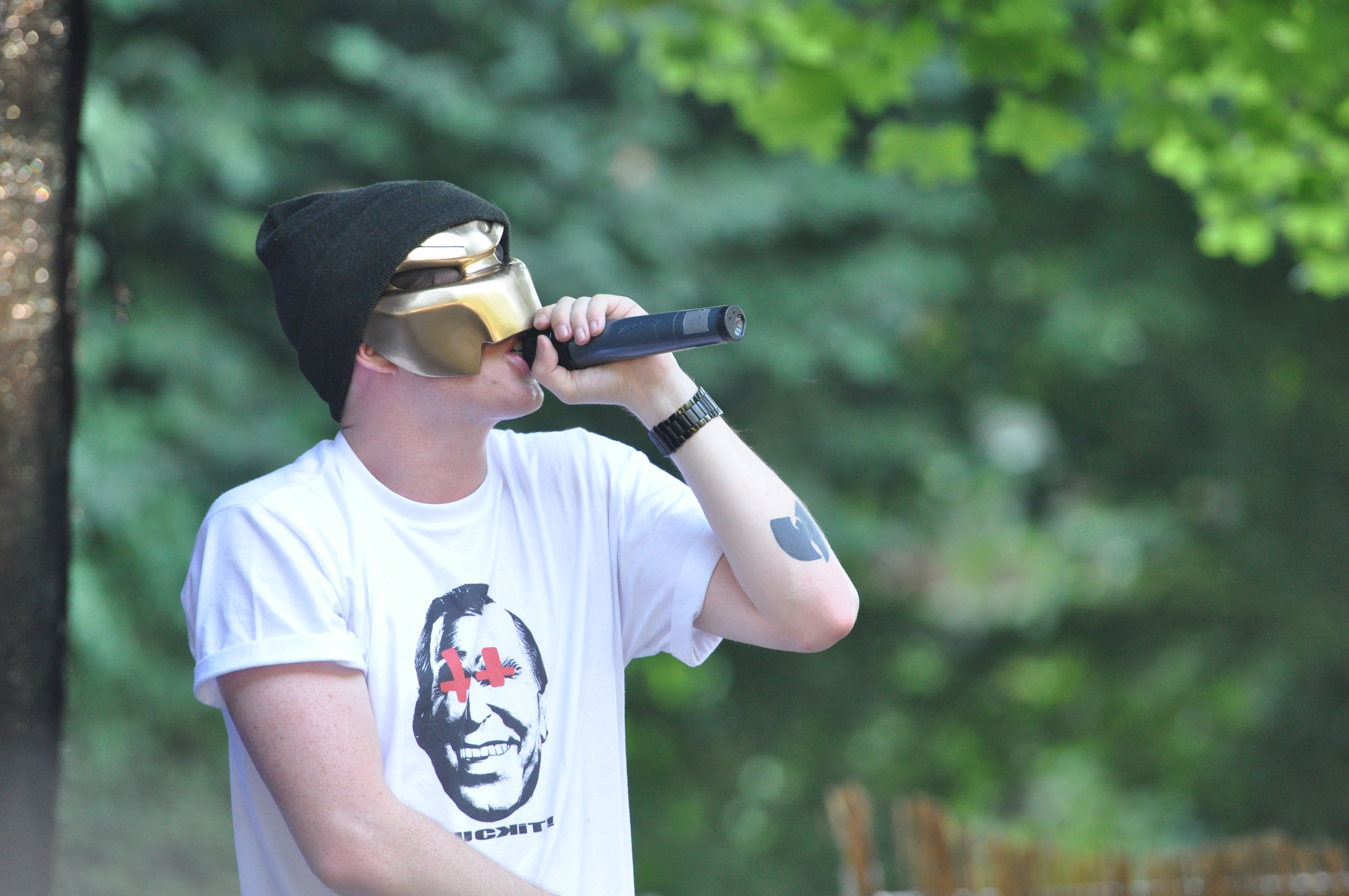
- Lance Butters at the Splash! on 16 August 2013
- Born: 1988 (age 36–37); Friedrichshafen, Baden-Württemberg, West Germany
- Occupations: Rapper; songwriter
- Years active: 2006–present
- Musical career
- Genres: Battle rap, Cloud rap
- Instrument: Vocals
- Labels: Four Music; A Corn Dawg; UMG

Lance Butters (born 1988) is a German rapper. Born and raised in Friedrichshafen in southern Germany, Butters started rapping in his youth.

== Biography ==
Lance Butters was born in 1988 in the South German town Friedrichshafen. In his childhood, his parents divorced, which he often mentioned in his music. Between 2006 and 2010, he participated in the Reimliga Battle Arena, a German online platform for rap battles. In 2010 and 2011, he participated in the Videobattleturnier (VBT), but lost against Tamo-Flage in 2010 and T-Jey in 2011. In the years, he also released multiple freetracks with the producer Bennett One on YouTube. On 22 December 2011, he released the studio album cooking sum as a member of the Frank Castle Cooking Gang, through Bandcamp. On 27 July 2012, he independently released his first solo project, the selfish EP. In May 2013, he signed with Four Music, through he released the EP futureshit on 12 July 2013. The EP charted at no. 32 for one week on the German Albums Chart, while the same titled single debuted at no. 73 in Austria.

His debut studio album Blaow was released on 8 May 2015 and debuted in the top ten in Germany and Austria. His second album was released on 12 October 2018.

On 20 April 2020, Butters released the single "Therapie" to commemorate the International day for cannabis. The following day, he released his fifth extended play Loner through A Corn Dawg Records. The same day, he announced a tour in Germany and Austria for October 2020, which was postponed due to the COVID-19 pandemic to May/June 2021.

== Discography ==
=== Studio albums ===
List of studio albums, with chart positions
Title	Album details	Peak chart positions		
Title	Album details	GER	AUT	SWI
Blaow	Released: 8 May 2015; Label: Four Music; Formats: CD, LP, digital download	2	6	31
Angst	Released: 12 October 2018; Label: Four Music; Formats: CD, LP, digital download,	10	11	70

=== Extended plays ===
List of extended plays, with chart positions
Title	Album details	Peak
Title	Album details	GER
selfish	Released: 27 July 2012; Label: Self-released; Formats: CD, digital download	—
futureshit	Released: 12 July 2013; Label: FourMusic; Formats: CD, digital download	32
Die Welle (with Ahzumjot)	Released: 4 October 2016; Label: FourMusic; Formats: CD, digital download	—
Loner	Released: 21 April 2020; Label: Corn Dawg Records; Formats: CD, digital download	—

=== Singles ===
List of singles as lead artist
Title	Year	Album
"Wie gewohnt" (feat. Chris Miles)	2013	Non-album single
"Raw"	2015	Blaow
"Deal with It"	2015	Blaow
"Es zieht / Ich zieh"	2015	Blaow
"Track-by-Track Intro"	2015	Blaow
"Ohladidadida" (feat. Dissythekid)	2016	Non-album single
"Yeeeaaah"	2018	Angst
"So Schön"	2018	Angst
"Keller"	2018	Angst
"Therapie"	2020	Loner

== Awards and nominations ==
Award Ceremony	Year	Work	Category	Result
Berlin Music Video Awards	2016	Es Zieht, Ich Zieh	Best Cinematography	Nominated
Berlin Music Video Awards	2019	SO SCHÖN	Best Concept	Nominated
Berlin Music Video Awards	2023	KNOCK KNOCK	Best Performer	Nominated
