= Rebel Woman =

Studio album by Chiwoniso Maraire
- Released: September 2, 2008 (US)
- Genre: World music
- Length: 52:14
- Label: Cumbancha
- Producer: Chiwoniso Maraire, Keith Farquharson, Jacob Edgar

Rebel Woman is a 2008 album by Chiwoniso Maraire and her first international release in more than 10 years, released via the U.S.-based independent label Cumbancha. Chiwoniso's music on the album incorporates elements of traditional African music, British rhythm and blues, and modern African sounds, particularly those of Zimbabwe. The tracks are backed by the sounds of the traditional Marimba.

== Critical reception ==
Philip Van Vreck of Billboard praised the album's title track, saying that it "testifies to the strength of women in war and in peace." He also called "Listen to the Breeze" a "beautiful song that possesses the elegant expansiveness so typical of such African players as Hugh Masekela and West Nkosi." François Blain of the Canadian Broadcasting Corporation complimented the album's balance of traditional and modern musical styles. Allmusic's Adam Greenberg wrote that throughout the album's myriad of styles and themes, from the political to cultural to straightforward dance music, "Chiwoniso's sound is clean and complex, her vocals and mbira holding the front of the stage."

== Track listing ==
1. Vanorapa (4:04)
2. Matsotsi (5:05)
3. Gomo (4:26)
4. Nguva Ye Kufara (4:38)
5. Kurima (5:30)
6. Listen To The Breeze (3:48)
7. Wakashinga (4:14)
8. Irobukairo (4:35)
9. Pamuromo (2:41)
10. Nerudo (4:22)
11. Only One World (4:20)
12. Rebel Woman (4:31)

== Charts ==
Chart (2008)	Peak position
U.S. Billboard Top World Albums	14
