= Gleisdreieck (album) =

Studio album by Joy Denalane
- Released: March 3, 2017
- Language: German
- Label: Nesola; Four Music

Joy Denalane chronology
Maureen (2011)	Gleisdreieck (2017)	Let Yourself Be Loved (2020)

Gleisdreieck (Triangle of Rails) is the fourth studio album by German recording artist Joy Denalane. It was released by Nesola Records and Four Music on March 3, 2017. Named after the same-titled Berlin U-Bahn station in the Kreuzberg district, it marked Denalane's first album in six years

== Critical reception ==
Professional ratings
Review scores
Source	Rating
Laut.de	3/5 stars

Anastasia Hartleib from Laut.de was critical with Gleisdreieck's heavy use of autotune effects but enjoyed the overall sound of the album, writing: "Musically, there's hardly anything wrong with Gleisdreieck. The productions are varied but always to the point. There are no unnecessary flourishes, the sometimes quiet, sometimes driving compositions remain pleasantly in the background and give Denalane enough space to showcase her voice aptly. Her fourth album sounds thoroughly modern and knocks the dusty German soul clean. The singer balances masterfully between her roots and current trends. At least most of the time."

== Track listing ==
Gleisdreieck track listing
No.	Title	Lyrics	Music	Producer(s)	Length
1.	"Gleisdreieck (Intro)" (spoken by Jamil Denalane)	Kevin Rittberger	Max Herre; Roberto Di Gioia; Samon Kawamura	Herre; Di Gioia; Kawamura	0:52
2.	"Himmel berühren"	Joy Denalane; Maxim Richarz; Herre	Herre; Di Gioia; Kawamura	Herre; Di Gioia; Kawamura; Tua^{[a]}	4:23
3.	"So sieht man sich wieder" (featuring Tua)	Denalane; Richarz; Johannes "Tua" Bruhns	Denalane; Richarz; Bruhns	Tua	3:37
4.	"Hologramm"	Denalane; Herre; Richarz	Herre; Di Gioia; Kawamura; Bruhns	Herre; Di Gioia; Kawamura; Tua	3:32
5.	"Venus & Mars"	Denalane; Shakeri	Denalane; Philip Niessen	Herre; Di Gioia; Kawamura; Tua	3:22
6.	"Wieder gut"	Denalane; Shakeri	Shakeri; Herre; Di Gioia; Kawamura	Herre; Di Gioia; Kawamura	4:43
7.	"Alles leuchtet" (G3E Version)	Denalane; Ali Zuckowski; Martin Fliegenschmidt	Denalane; Zuckowski; David Jürgens; Fliegenschmidt; Ben Bazzazian	Bazzazian; Herre; Di Gioia; Kawamura; Derek von Krogh^{[a]}	3:29
8.	"Zwischen den Zeilen"	Denalane; Shakeri	Perry Perezovic; Shakeri; Herre; Di Gioia; Kawamura	Herre; Di Gioia; Kawamura	4:30
9.	"B.I.N.D.A.W."	Denalane; Alexander Freund	Denalane; Freund	Freund	4:50
10.	"Elli Lou"	Denalane; Herre; Zuckowski; Fliegenschmidt; Uchenna van Capelleveen	Denalane; Zuckowski; Fliegenschmidt; Alan Mensah	Ghanaian Stallion; Herre^{[a]}; Di Gioia^{[a]}; Kawamura^{[a]}	4:25
11.	"Vorsichtig sein"	Denalane; Herre; Richarz	Herre; Di Gioia; Kawamura	Herre; Di Gioia; Kawamura	3:31
12.	"Schlaflos" (featuring Megaloh)	Denalane; Jürgens; Zuckowski; Uchenna van Capelleveen	Denalane; Jürgens; Zuckowski	Jürgens; Zuckowski; Herre^{[a]}; Di Gioia^{[a]}; Kawamura^{[a]}	3:45
13.	"Deshalb" (featuring Ahzumjot)	Denalane; Herre; Richarz; Shakeri; Alan Julian Asare-Tawiah	Denalane; Jürgens; Zuckowski	Herre; Di Gioia; Kawamura; Tua^{[a]}	4:58
14.	"RotSchwarz"	Denalane; Herre; Richarz	Herre; Di Gioia; Kawamura	Herre; Di Gioia; Kawamura; Tua^{[a]}	5:19
15.	"Stadt"	Denalane; Herre; Richarz	Herre; Di Gioia; Kawamura	Herre; Di Gioia; Kawamura; Tua^{[a]}	4:21
16.	"Gleisdreieck" (Outro)	Herre	Herre; Di Gioia; Kawamura	Herre; Di Gioia; Kawamura	0:21
17.	"Zuhause"	Denalane; Freund	Denalane; Freund	Freund	3:01
18.	"Alles leuchtet" (single version)	Denalane; Zuckowski; Fliegenschmidt	Denalane; Zuckowski; Jürgens; Fliegenschmidt	Jürgens; Herre; Di Gioia; Kawamura; Derek von Krogh^{[a]}	3:29

== Charts ==
Chart performance for Gleisdreieck
Chart (2017)	Peak position
Austrian Albums (Ö3 Austria)	36
German Albums (Offizielle Top 100)	8
Swiss Albums (Schweizer Hitparade)	25

== Release history ==
Gleisdreieck release history
Region	Date	Edition(s)	Format(s)	Label	Ref.
Various	March 3, 2017	Standard; deluxe	CD; digital download; streaming; vinyl	Nesola Records	
