= Dwele (album) =

Mixtape by Dwele
- Released: February 24, 2009
- Genre: R&B; soul

Dwele chronology
The Dresden Soul Symphony (2008)	Dwele (2009)	W.ants W.orld W.omen (2010)

Dwele is a self-titled unofficial mixtape by the American R&B singer Dwele, released on February 24, 2009.

== Track listing ==
Number	Track name	Length
1	"Coming Home (Acapella)"	1:25
2	"I'm Cheatin'"	3:43
3	"Shady"	4:28
4	"Sketches of a Man"	1:29
5	"Love Ultra"	3:45
6	"Brandi"	2:19
7	"Don't You Have a Man"	1:04
8	"I Think I Love You"	3:46
9	"Got #2"	1:31
10	"Lady at Mahogany"	4:05
11	"Without You" (featuring Raphael Saadiq)	2:10
12	"The Sun (Remix)" (featuring New Sector Movements)	4:57
13	"Money Don't Mean a Thing"	3:46
14	"That's The Way of The World" (Earth Wind and Fire cover)	5:18
15	"Too High" (Stevie Wonder cover)	4:01
16	"Open Your Eyes"	2:25
17	"Tainted" (featuring Slum Village)	1:29
18	"Flashing Lights" (with Kanye West)	1:48
19	"The People" (with Common)	1:18
20	"Say How I Feel" (featuring Slum Village)	1:17
21	"Fall In Love"	1:37
22	"Hold On" (featuring Kanye West)	3:12
23	"What's Goin' On" (Marvin Gaye cover)	1:37
24	"Startin' Somethin" (Michael Jackson cover)	1:52
25	"Without You (Live)"	4:50
26	"Whose in Town"	1:43
27	"Hold On"	2:26
28	"My Lova"	3:43
29	Wuneanunda	2:50
