= The Dresden Soul Symphony =

German concert show

- Years active: 2008–present
- Members: Bilal; Joy Denalane; Tweet; Dwele; MDR Symphony Orchestra

The Dresden Soul Symphony is a German concert show. The musicians reinterpret soul hits and combine them with classical music. The musical ensemble contains the singers Joy Denalane, Bilal, Tweet and Dwele; the radio orchestra of the Mitteldeutscher Rundfunk; four backing vocalists; the MDR children's choir and four instrumentalists, who do not belong to the orchestra. The performance venue of the show is Dresden, Germany. The premiere was on April 26, 2008.

== Project history ==
The idea of The Dresden Soul Symphony came from Reinhard Bärenz, the musical director of the German radio station MDR Sputnik. Bärenz had some experience with classical music – he played the violin professionally in a symphony orchestra in the 1980s. Bärenz decided to found a crossover project to combine classical music with another music genre. He sought for the support of Johann Michael Möller, the radio director of the MDR who was enthusiastic about Bärenz's idea. So he contracted the MDR Symphony Orchestra and Bärenz started contacting various musicians. The first to join the project was soul singer Joy Denalane. Bärenz believed that soul and classic would work well together. For that reason the American soul musicians Bilal, Tweet and Dwele joined the ensemble. Bärenz was able to engage Larry Gold (former cellist of MFSB) and Daniel Felsenfeld (composer of classical music and Gold's son-in-law) as arrangers.

The show took place on April 26 and 27, 2008 at 08:00 pm (CET) in the concert hall Alter Schlachthof in Dresden, Germany. It was broadcast by radio stations MDR Sputnik and MDR Figaro live on April 27 from 9 pm (CET). Both a CD and DVD were released in October 2008.

== Discography ==
- The Dresden Soul Symphony

== Songs ==
=== Movement I: Sonata-Allegro ===
- "Prelude"
- "Midnight Train to Georgia" by Gladys Knight & the Pips
- "I Thank You" by Sam & Dave
- "Take Me to the River" by Al Green
- "(You Make Me Feel Like) A Natural Woman" by Aretha Franklin
- "I Got a Woman" by Ray Charles
- "Lovin' You" by Minnie Riperton
- "Midnight Train to Georgia" (Reprise)

=== Movement II: Adagio ===
- "A Song for You" by Leon Russell
- "You're All I Need to Get By" by Marvin Gaye and Tammi Terrell
- "Let's Stay Together" by Al Green
- "It's a Man's Man's Man's World" by James Brown
- "Me and Mrs. Jones" by Billy Paul
- "Betcha by Golly Wow!" by The Stylistics

=== Movement III: Scherzo ===
- "I'll Take You There" by The Staple Singers
- "ABC" by The Jackson 5
- "Sir Duke" by Stevie Wonder
- "Everything Is Everything" by Lauryn Hill

=== Movement IV: Finale ===
- "Prelude"
- "Master Blaster (Jammin)" by Stevie Wonder
- "Love's Theme" by Love Unlimited Orchestra
- "The Sound of Philadelphia" by MFSB
- "Love Train" by The O'Jays
- "Ain't No Stoppin' Us Now" by McFadden & Whitehead
- "Midnight Train to Georgia" (Finale)
