= Malou Lovis Kreyelkamp =

German singer (born 1999)

- Also known as: Malou Lovis
- Born: 1999 (age 26–27); Wettringen, Germany
- Occupation: Singer
- Instrument: Vocals
- Years active: 2020–present

Malou Lovis Kreyelkamp (born 1999 in Wettringen) is a German singer. She is the winner of season 13 of the German talent competition The Voice of Germany, having competed on the team coached by Bill & Tom Kaulitz (from the band Tokio Hotel).

== Personal life ==
She lives in Cologne.

In her single "Glacier Rivers", Kreyelkamp thematized her coming out. In the song she is talking to her younger self, wishing her to be strong and brave enough to admit she wants to date women. She wants to encourage everyone who feels similar to stand up for themselves.

== Career ==
Kreyelkamp has released four singles on streaming platforms before her participation in The Voice of Germany.

=== The Voice of Germany 2023 ===
In 2023, Kreyelkamp auditioned for the thirteenth season of The Voice of Germany, singing "Rainbow Connection" by Jim Henson from The Muppet Movie. All four coaches turned, but Bill & Tom Kaulitz used their "block" on Ronan Keating, preventing Keating from getting Kreyelkamp on his team. Kreyelkamp ultimately chose to be a part of Team Bill & Tom, where she won the season on 8 December with 28.62% of the public vote. Even before the official announcement of the title, Kreyelkamp was spontaneously invited by the Kaulitz brothers to join as a guest singer on Tokio Hotel's European tour in 2025.

Upon winning the show, Kreyelkamp sang her original song, "Glacier Rivers", which was then released as a single. Following her victory, she was given the opportunity to sign a record deal with the label Embassy of Music under Ministry of Sound.

Performances on The Voice of Germany season 13
Round	Song	Original artist	Order	Original air date	Result
Blind Auditions	"Rainbow Connection"	Jim Henson	6.4	6 October 2023	All four coaches (Giovanni Zarrella, Bill & Tom Kaulitz, Shirin David, and Ronan Keating) turned, joined Team Bill & Tom
Battles rounds	"Everytime" (vs. Luna Cavari)	Britney Spears	12.8	22 October 2023	Saved by coach
Teamfights	"Don't Watch Me Cry"	Jorja Smith	17.6	24 November 2023	Saved by studio audience
Semi-finals	"People Help the People"	Cherry Ghost	18.13	1 December 2023	Saved by public
Finale	"Glacier Rivers"	Malou Lovis Kreyelkamp	19.3	8 December 2023	Winner
Finale	"All the Love That I Needed" (with James Blunt)	James Blunt	19.9	8 December 2023	Winner

== Discography ==
=== Singles ===
List of singles, with selected chart positions
Title	Year	Peak chart positions	Album
Title	Year	GER	Album
"Vielleicht" (with Greta Marvie)	2020	—	Non-album single
"Song of the Ocean"	2020	—	Non-album single
"Wind Blows" (with Jan Benkest & NZ6)	2023	—	Non-album single
"How They Know" (with Jan Benkest)	2023	—	Non-album single
"Glacier Rivers"	2023	—	Non-album single
"Breathing"	2019		Breathing Ben Bohmer,Nils Hoffman ,Malou.

Awards and achievements
Preceded by Anny Ogrezeanu	The Voice of Germany; Winner; 2023	Succeeded by Jennifer Lynn
