= Mamani (album) =

Studio album by Joy Denalane
- Released: June 3, 2002
- Length: 70:24
- Label: Four Music; Columbia; Sony
- Producer: Max Herre

Joy Denalane chronology
Mamani (2002)	Mamani Live (2004)

Mamani (Tsonga: Mother) is the debut studio album by German singer Joy Denalane. It was released by Four Music in association with Columbia Records on June 3, 2002 in German-speaking Europe. Chiefly produced by Max Herre, Mamani peaked at number 8 on the German Albums Chart and was certified Gold by the Bundesverband Musikindustrie (BVMI). It spawned six singles, including "Sag's Mir", "Geh Jetzt", "Was Auch Immer", "Im Ghetto von Soweto", "Kinderlied" and "Höchste Zeit."

== Critical reception ==
Professional ratings
Review scores
Source	Rating
Laut.de	4/5 stars

Laut.de editor Nkechi Uzoma rated the album four out of five stars. She wrote that Mamani "has a lot to offer musically and lyrically. Swinging, pulsating, original and goes to the core and soul. An album that clearly stands out in the little-scoured market of good German soul. Great soul with a great voice. Anyone who continues to give Joy Denalane only a questioning look is either blind, deaf or to blame."

== Track listing ==
All tracks produced by Max Herre; co-produced by Timmy Wittinger, Don Phillipe, Franc Kuruc and Tom Krüger.

Mamani track listing
No.	Title	Writer(s)	Length
1.	"Setho"	W. Henderson	1:55
2.	"Miscommunication"	Joy Denalane; Max Herre; Philippe Kayser; Tommy Wittinger; Frank Kuruc	5:06
3.	"Geh jetzt"	Denalane; Herre; Kayser; Wittinger; Kuruc	5:27
4.	"Bantwana" (Skit)		0:47
5.	"Höchste Zeit"	Denalane; Herre; Kayser; Wittinger; Kuruc	4:59
6.	"Vier Frauen" (featuring Sara Tavares, Chiwoniso & Deborah)	Nina Simone	5:46
7.	"Sag's mir"	Denalane; Herre; Kayser; Wittinger; Kuruc	4:36
8.	"Ma Jimbos" (Skit)		0:54
9.	"Im Ghetto von Soweto (Auntie's House)" (featuring Hugh Masekela)	Denalane; Herre; Kayser; Wittinger; Kuruc	5:26
10.	"Kinderlied"	Denalane; Herre; Kayser; Wittinger; Kuruc	4:49
11.	"Was auch immer"	Denalane; Herre; Kayser; Wittinger; Kuruc	5:32
12.	"Passenger Denalane" (Skit)		0:58
13.	"Mamani" (featuring Hugh Masekela)	Caiphus Semenya	2:09
14.	"Fragen (Ein Brief aus Lesotho)"	Denalane; Herre; Kayser; Wittinger; Kuruc; Berthold Brecht	3:57
15.	"Wem gehört die Welt"	Denalane; Herre; Johnny Watson	4:36
16.	"I Cover the Waterfront"	Johnny Green; Edward Heyman	4:01
17.	"Outro"	Denalane; Herre; Kuruc	2:47
18.	"Mathatha Agotlokamna" (featuring Mahotella Queens)	Mildred Mangxola; Hilda Tloubatla; Nobesuthu Mbadu	1:49
Total length:			70:24

== Personnel ==
- Dan Abitol – violin
- Odile Biard – violin
- Felix Borel – violin
- Minu Constantin – vocal assistance
- Ian Cumming – trombone
- Fola Dada – vocal assistance
- Kathrin Distler – cello
- Ross Feltus – photography
- Andreas Fischer – viola
- Klaus Graf – saxophone
- Daniel Gottschalk – photography
- Max Herre – executive producer, producer
- Denise Hill – vocal assistance
- Michael Kedaisch – marimba
- Cherie Kedida – vocal assistance
- Franc Kuruc – guitar, producer
- Tom Krüger – bass, producer, mixing, mastering
- Dalma Lima – percussion
- Chiwoniso Maraire – mbira
- Klaus Marquardt – violin
- Stephanos Notopoulos – photography
- Claudia Pfister – violin
- Don Phillipe – wurlitzer, producer, mixing
- Raphael Sacha – viola
- Samir – vocal assistance
- Christoph Sauer – bass
- Violina Sauleva – viola
- Lillo Scrimali – piano, organ, synthesizer
- Tim Ströble – cello
- Sebastian Studinitzky – horn
- Felix Thomas – vocal assistance
- Myriam Trück – violin
- Matthias Trück – cello
- Tommy W. – drums, producer, mixing

== Charts ==
=== Weekly charts ===
Weekly chart performance for Mamani
Chart (2002)	Peak position
Austrian Albums (Ö3 Austria)	44
German Albums (Offizielle Top 100)	8
Swiss Albums (Schweizer Hitparade)	54

=== Year-end charts ===
Year-end chart performance for Mamani
Chart (2002)	Position
German Albums (Offizielle Top 100)	62

== Certifications ==
Certifications for Mamani
Region	Certification	Certified units/sales
Germany (BVMI)	Gold	150,000^{‡}
^{‡} Sales+streaming figures based on certification alone.
