= Joy Denalane =

German singer-songwriter (born 1973)

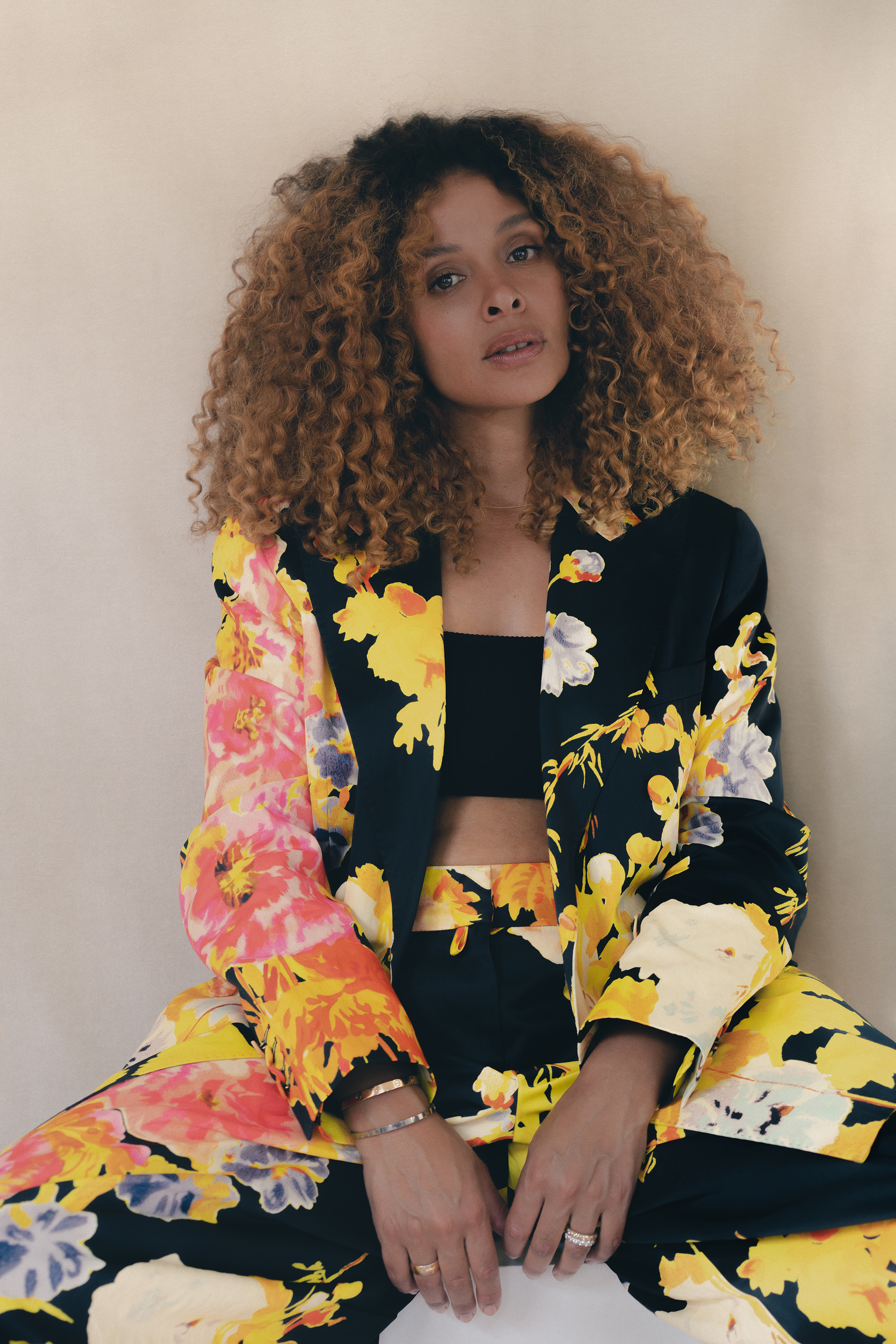
- Denalane in 2018

Background information
- Born: Joy Maureen Denalane; 11 June 1973 (age 53); West Berlin, West Germany
- Genres: Soul, R&B, jazz, folk
- Occupation: Singer-songwriter
- Years active: 1999–present
- Labels: Nesola, Four, Motown, Vertigo Berlin
- Website: joydenalane.com

Joy Maureen Denalane (born 11 June 1973) is a German singer-songwriter, known for her mixture of soul, R&B, and African folk music with lyrics in German and English.

== Early life ==
Denalane was born in Berlin-Schöneberg to a South African father and a German mother, but grew up in the Berlin district of Kreuzberg. At the age of 16, she left home and focused on her music, joining the reggae and soul bands Culture Roots and Family Affair. At 19 she was signed to a major pop music label, but she and her management could not agree on what her music and image should be like and Denalane soon asked to be released. Afterwards, she moved to Stuttgart, where she met DJ Thomilla and Tiefschwarz (two already well-known producers active in the Kolchose), with whom she wrote and produced the club hit "Music".

== Career ==
=== 1999–2005: Debut and Mamani ===
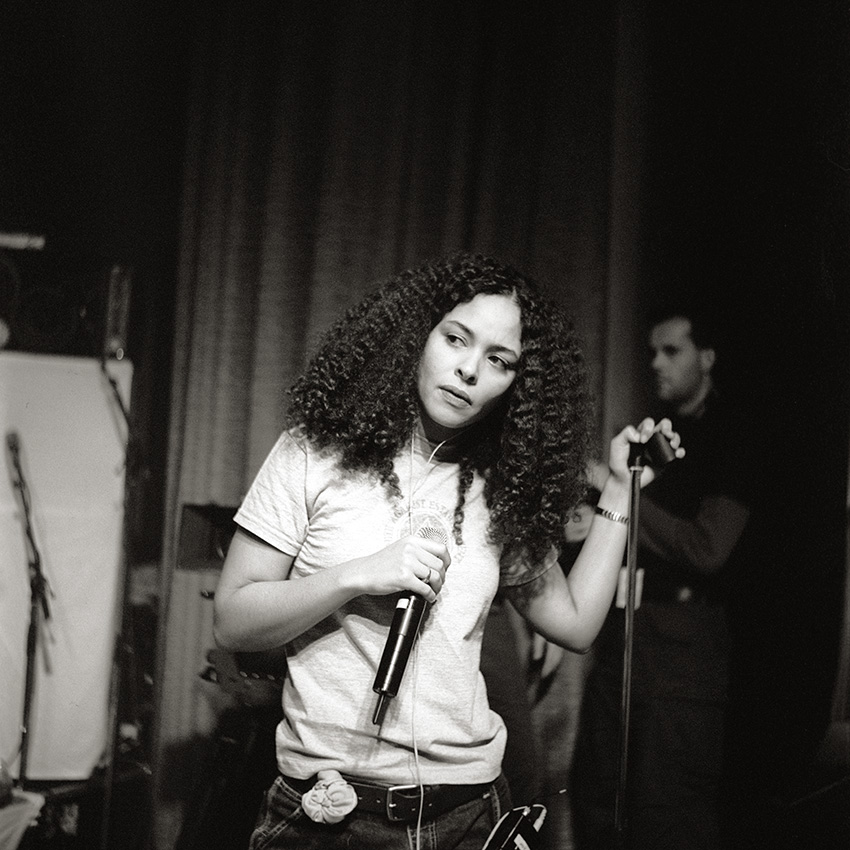
Denalane in 1999

Around the same time, Denalane came in first contact with hip hop group Freundeskreis, who searched for a female counterpart to lead singer Max Herre's voice on their track "Mit Dir" then. However, the duet was released as a single in July 1999 and made the top 10 in Germany, the top 30 in Austria, and the top 15 in Switzerland—pushed by the fact Denalane and Herre had become a couple.

Afterwards Denalane joined the FK Allstars, which also consisted of Afrob, Gentleman, Sekou, and Brooke Russell, among others, and went on tour with them for more than two years. Later on she signed a contract with Four Music (founded by Die Fantastischen Vier) and began working on her debut album Mamani, which was released in June 2002 and debuted at number eight on the German Albums Chart. Inspired by African roots, the album was primarily produced by husband Max Herre. In total Mamani spawned six singles, including the lead single "Sag's Mir", the socially critical track "Im Ghetto von Soweto" (featuring her uncle, South African flugelhorn legend Hugh Masekela), and "Kinderlied", a song dedicated to her oldest son Isaiah.

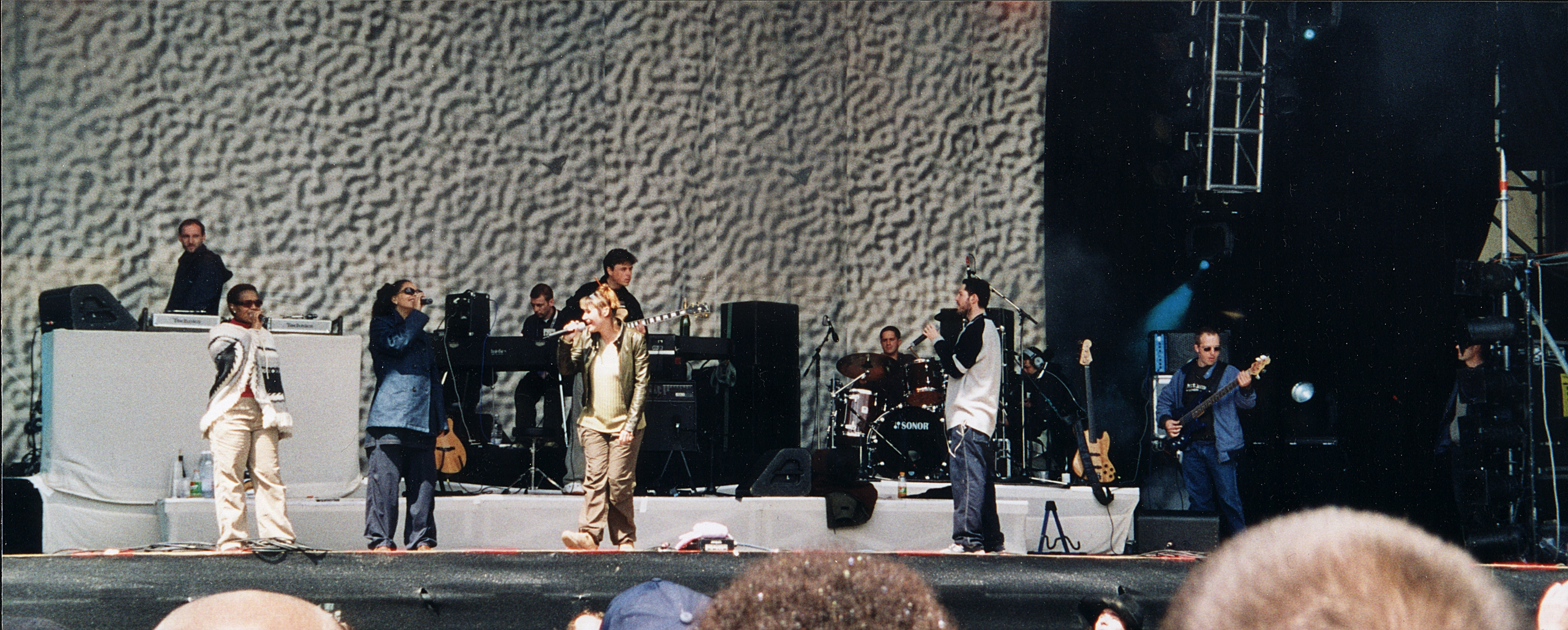
Denalane onstage with Freundeskreis at the Gurtenfestival in Bern, Switzerland in 2000

In 2003, Denalane went on a solo tour and finished collaborations with Youssou N'Dour, ASD, and Till Brönner. She also performed in New York City and Philadelphia for the first time and eventually received a Comet for Best Hip-Hop/R&B National and three ECHO nominations, including Best Female Artist. Soon after she released a live edition of Mamani on CD and DVD, which was recorded during a special performance at Berlin's Tränenpalast and involved a set of previously unreleased remakes. In summer 2005 Denalane contributed vocals to the German version of Common's 2005 single "Go!".

=== 2006–2015: Born and Raised and Maureen ===
In April 2006, Denalane and Herre founded their own label, Nesola. Simultaneously Denalane prepared the release of her second album, Born & Raised, her first record in English. Pre-programmed in Germany, the album was entirely recorded in Philadelphia and features appearances by American rappers Lupe Fiasco, Raekwon, and Governor. While its lead single "Let Go" reached a moderately successful number 40 on the German Singles Chart, the critically acclaimed Born & Raised (released in August 2006) debuted at number two (behind Christina Aguilera's Back to Basics) on the national albums chart, making it Denalane's highest chart entry to date. Further singles from the album, "Heaven or Hell" and "Sometimes Love", failed to chart within the top one hundred. In early 2007, Denalane released the single "Change" (featuring Lupe Fiasco) in the United Kingdom, which failed to chart; however, it was featured in the 2008 blockbuster film, Taken, starring Liam Neeson.

In 2008, Denalane worked with Tweet, Dwele and Bilal on the project The Dresden Soul Symphony in Dresden, Germany. They performed classic soul cuts like "Let's Stay Together", "Natural Woman", "It's a Man's Man's Man's World", "Ain't Nothing Like a Real Thing", etc. with the MDR Symphony Orchestra. An album, The Dresden Soul Symphony, and DVD were later released on 24 October 2008.

Denalane's third studio Maureen, titled after her middle name, was released May 2011. Her first German-language studio album since Mamani (2002), it received a positive response from critics and reached number eight on the German Albums Chart. Elsewhere the album peaked at number thirty-six in Austria and number eleven on the Swiss Albums Chart, becoming both her highest and lowest-charting album yet, respectively. Spawning four singles, an English language version of Maureen was released in March 2012.

In August 2014, Denalane became a judge on the debut season of the RTL reality program, Rising Star along with Sasha, Gentleman, and Anastacia.

=== 2016–present: Gleisdreieck and Let Yourself Be Loved ===
In 2017, Denalane released her fourth studio album, Gleisdreieck, her third German-language album.

On 4 September 2020, Denalane released her fifth studio album, Let Yourself Be Loved, via Motown Records. It is her second English-language album.

== Discography ==
=== Studio albums ===
- Mamani (2002)
- Born & Raised (2006)
- Maureen (2011)
- Gleisdreieck (2017)
- Let Yourself Be Loved (2020)
- Willpower (2023)

=== Live albums ===
- Mamani Live (2004)
- The Dresden Soul Symphony (2008)
