= Max Herre =

German rapper, singer-songwriter

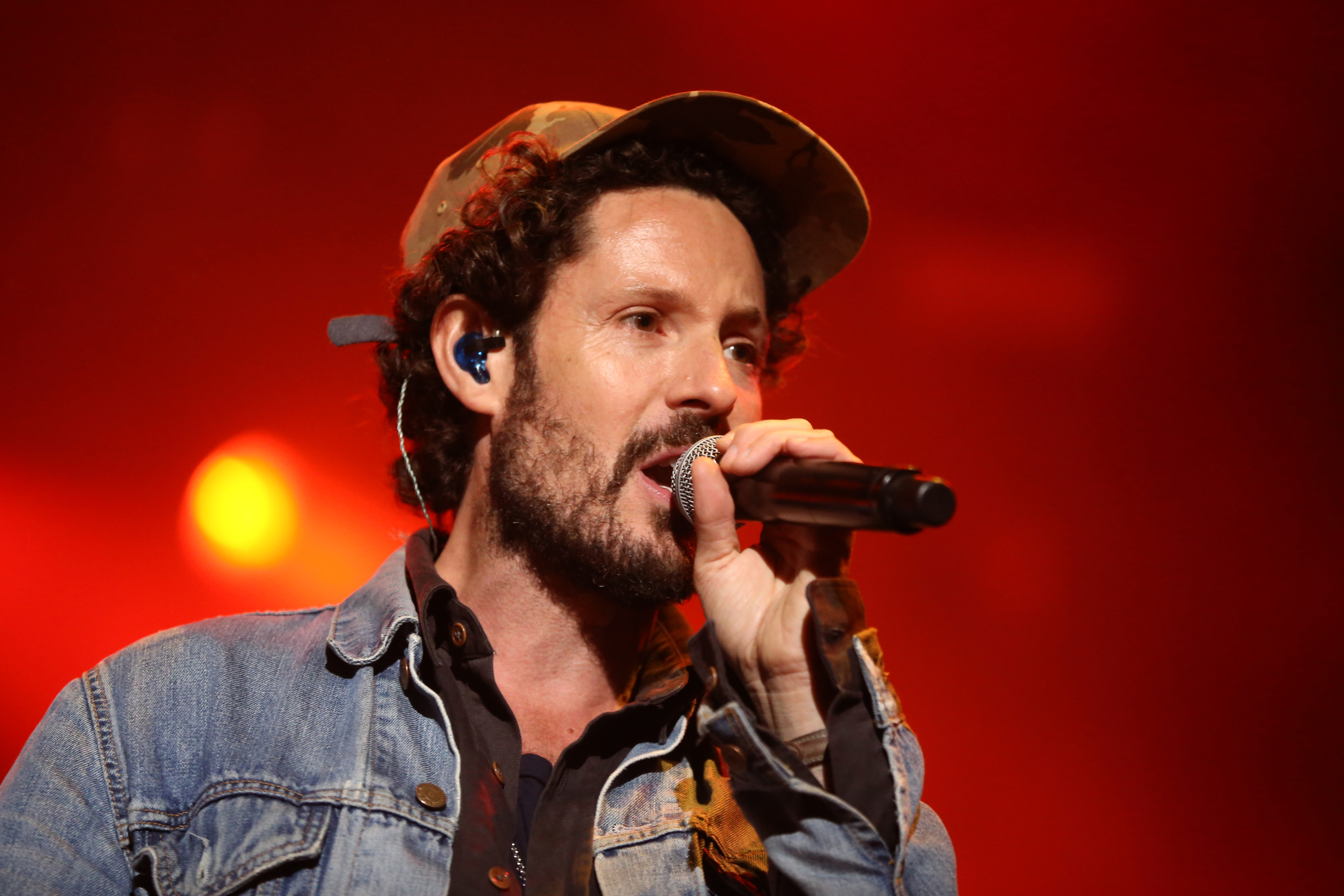
- Herre in 2013

Background information
- Born: Maximilian Herre; 22 April 1973 (age 52); Stuttgart, West Germany
- Genres: Hip hop, R&B, pop
- Occupations: Rapper, singer, songwriter, record producer
- Years active: 2004–present (solo)
- Labels: Nesola/Four Music
- Website: maxherre.de

Maximilian Herre (born 22 April 1973) is a German rapper, singer-songwriter and music producer who rose to fame as a member of the group Freundeskreis. He is also A&R for the record label Nesola, a joint venture with his wife Joy Denalane, among others.

== Early life and career ==
Herre was born in Stuttgart. After hearing the 1990s German hip-hop group Advanced Chemistry, he decided to create hip-hop himself in German. He started his first band, Seedless Jam, when he was 15, and his first hip-hop project, Agit Jazz, four years later with music producer Philippe A. Kayser (Don Philippe). In order to perform their music live, they formed the band Maximilian und sein Freundeskreis in 1993 with another producer, DJ Friction (Martin Welzer). In the same year, Herre also founded the hip-hop group Kolchose with other Stuttgart artists.

== Career ==
=== Freundeskreis ===
Herre, Philippe, and Welzer signed with the label Four Music (founded by German rap pioneers Die Fantastischen Vier) in 1997, and soon after made a musical and commercial breakthrough with the single A-N-N-A. The song has sold more than 250,000 copies. Freundeskreis's debut album, Die Quadratur des Kreises, has sold more than 170,000 copies.

In 1999, their second album, Esperanto, sold more than 300,000 copies. Their live double-album, En Directo der FK Allstars, was recorded in the same year.

Although Freundeskreis seemed to have performed its last concerts in 2000, the band re-appeared in 2007 at different festivals, including the festival MTV Hip-Hop Open in Stuttgart, where they celebrated the 10th anniversary of the band's founding.

=== FK-Allstars ===
Herre also founded the FK-Allstars, a collaboration of 15 musical artists, including Gentleman, Afrob, Sékou, Joy Denalane and Brooke Russell. In 2000 they performed at some of central Europe's biggest music festivals, i.e. Rock im Park, Rock am Ring, and Splash!. Herre left the group after the tour.

=== Music producer ===
Herre retreated from public life after the birth of his first son in 2001, and concentrated on producing Mami, the debut album of his wife, Joy Denalane. Mami reached the top 10 in Germany and received three nominations for the German music award, the Echo.

In August 2006 the second album of Joy Denalane's produced by Herre, Born and Raised, was released on the label Four Music.

=== Solo career ===
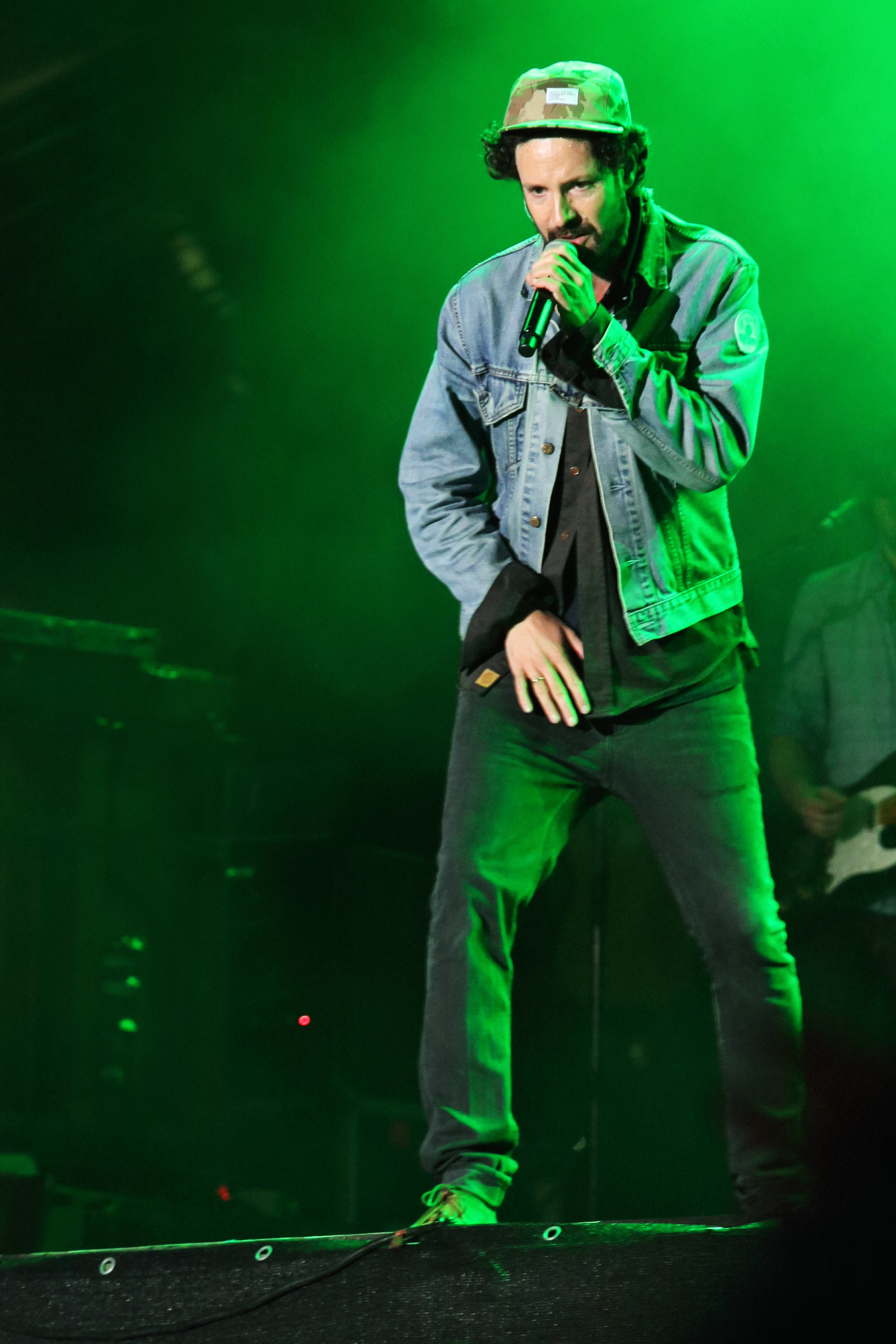
Herre performing in 2013

In September 2004, Herre released his debut eponymous solo album, Max Herre, a collection of songs in a variety of genres in addition to hip hop, including soul, reggae, and rock. The album was a commercial success. In April 2006, Herre, Joy Denalane, Götz Gottschalk, and Sophie Raml formed a new record label named Nesola.

Ein Geschenkter Tag, Herre's second solo album, appeared in 2009. In 2012, his third album, Hallo Welt!, was published.

In 2013, Herre became the third German hip-hop artist to be included in the German version of the MTV Unplugged album series, titling his MTV Unplugged Kahedi Radio Show. For the album he won the 2014 Echo Award for hip-hop performer of the year. The album reached gold two weeks after being released and soon after platinum.

In November 2019, after a six-year break, his fifth solo album Athen was released.

== Personal life ==
Herre is married to singer Joy Denalane, with whom he has two sons. Herre and Denalane separated in October 2007. In March 2011, they showed up at different events together and have stated that they are back together again. Herre also has a daughter, to whom he dedicated his album Hallo Welt!.

== Discography ==
=== Albums ===
- Max Herre (2004)
- Ein geschenkter Tag (2009)
- Hallo Welt! (2012)
- MTV Unplugged – Kahedi Radio Show (2013)
- Athen (2019)

=== Singles ===
- Zu elektrisch (2004)
- 1ste Liebe (2004) with Joy Denalane
- Du weißt (Bye Bye Baby) (2005)
- Number One (2005) with John Legend
- Du weißt (Bye Bye Baby) (2005)
- Geschenkter Tag / Blick nach vorn (2009)
- Scherben (2009)
- Niemand (2011) with Joy Denalane, Samy Deluxe and Megaloh
- Jeder Tag zuviel (2012)
- Wolke 7 (2012) featuring Philipp Poisel
- Fühlt sich wie fliegen an (2012) feat. Cro and Clueso
- Fremde (2013) feat. Sophie Hunger
