= Four Music =

German record label

Coordinates: 52.5305°N 13.3865°E

Four Music (Four Music Productions GmbH) is a German record label founded by hip hop group Die Fantastischen Vier in 1996. It was originally located in Stuttgart, but has moved to Kreuzberg, Berlin.

In 2004, Max Herre's debut album, as well as Confidence by Gentleman, and Viel by Die Fantastischen Vier were among the top 3 in the German album charts. The same year, the opening concert for the Popkomm solely consisted of artists signed on Four Music.

In July 2005, the record label Sony BMG Music Entertainment took over 50% of Four Music Productions for a seven-figure sum of money. According to the Annual Report of Four Music GmbH of fiscal year 2009 to 2010, Sony Music Entertainment Germany GmbH has acquired all the shares of Four Music GmbH.

== Notable artists ==
Notable musicians and groups signed on Four Music are:

- 3Plusss
- Afrob
- Blumentopf (until 2009)
- Casper
- Chakuza
- Clueso
- Freundeskreis (until 2007)
- Gentleman (until 2010)
- Grosssdatgeflüster (One Album)
- Jason Rowe
- Joy Denalane
- Lance Butters
- Mark Forster
- Marteria
- Max Herre
- Miss Platnum
- Son Goku (until 2002)

== See also ==
- List of record labels
