= Kraut (disambiguation) =

Kraut is an English-language ethnic slur for a German person.

Kraut may also refer to:

- Sauerkraut, a cabbage dish
- Kraut, German for cabbage or herb
- Kraut (surname)
- Kraut (band), a punk rock band from New York City
- Kraut, the b-side song on the Juke Joint Jezebel single by industrial rock group KMFDM
- Kraut Canyon, a valley in New Mexico
