= Eek-A-Nomics =

Studio album by Eek-A-Mouse
- Released: 19 December 1988
- Genre: Reggae
- Label: RAS
- Producer: Gary "Dr. Dread" Himelfarb, Noel Alphonso, Eek-A-Mouse

Eek-A-Mouse chronology
Mouse-A-Mania (1987)	Eek-A-Nomics (1988)	U-Neek (1991)

Eek-A-Nomics is the ninth studio album by Jamaican reggae artist Eek-A-Mouse. The Daily Hampshire Gazette called it a "worthwhile album" that showcases Eek-A-Mouse's "small, association-rich details to create alternative realities".

== Track listing ==
No.	Title	Length
1.	"The Freak"	5:11
2.	"Oh Me Oh My"	5:11
3.	"Come Back in the Morning"	4:13
4.	"Do Me"	4:00
5.	"Lies"	3:56
6.	"Champagne"	3:56
7.	"What Me Ago Do"	3:39
8.	"Glamity"	3:14
9.	"Rich and Famous"	3:39
10.	"Goon-A-Goon"	4:54
11.	"The Freak (Dance Vision)"	7:26

== Personnel ==
- Vocals – Eek-A-Mouse, Noel Alphonso, Paul Henton
- Bass – Paul Henton
- Drums – Noel Alphonso
- Guitar – Ronald Butler
- Piano – Paul Henton
