= German hip-hop =

Music genre

German hip-hop (locally known as Deutschrap) refers to hip-hop in the German language. Elements of American hip-hop culture, such as graffiti art and breakdancing, diffused into Western Europe in the early 1980s.

== History ==
=== 1980–1990 ===
Early underground artists included Cora E. and Advanced Chemistry. It was not until the early 1990s that German hip-hop entered the mainstream as groups like Die Fantastischen Vier and the Rödelheim Hartreim Projekt gained popularity. German hip-hop was heavily influenced by films, leading to a strong emphasis on visual and cultural elements such as graffiti and breakdancing beyond the music itself.

In addition to films such as Wild Style and Beat Street, American expats and soldiers stationed in West Germany facilitated the introduction of hip-hop music and culture into German pop culture.

GLS United released the first German-language hip-hop song, "Rapper's Deutsch" ("Rapper’s German"), in 1980. While the group (consisting of three radio DJs including the later comedian and TV host Thomas Gottschalk) was formed explicitly for the one song, and the song was intended primarily as a parody of "Rapper's Delight" by The Sugarhill Gang, it was nonetheless the first German hip-hop group and first German-language hip-hop track. Also, the punk rock band Die Toten Hosen released one of the first German hip-hop songs, "Hip Hop Bommi Bop ", in 1983, which was also one of the first rap rock crossovers ever. The song, created in collaboration with Fab 5 Freddy, is a parody hip-hop version of their song "Eisgekühlter Bommerlunder". Nina Hagen also raps in her 1983 single "New York / N.Y." New York New York, the English version of New York / N.Y., was successful in American dance charts, peaking at number nine on the Billboard Hot Dance Club Songs.

These hip-hop movies -Wild Style and Beat Street- led the younger audiences in Germany to realize that hip-hop was much more than just rap music, but was very much a cultural movement in and of itself. Though at the time of the release of the movies, they did not have a great overall impact, once German reunification began in 1990, the hip-hop scene began to flourish. As one German remembers on a visit to the US in 1986, things were much different. MTV did not exist in Europe at the time, and the scene was still very much underground. Moreover, there was a lack of European hip-hop clubs.

After this initial wave of popularity, hip-hop fans were few and far between. However, the fans that did remain would play a role in the revival of hip-hop culture in the country. "The hardcore hip-hop fans that remained after the breakdance craze faded from the media were central to the further development of hip-hop in Germany-they supplied much of the personnel for the important rap groups that began to develop in the late 1980s and early '90s." "Graffiti and breakdancing came out big but it only lasted for a short period of time. But hip-hop survived in the underground."

American hip-hop continued to influence the German scene, influencing emergent acts such as Rock Da Most. Originally most German rappers relied on English language lyrics, a fact which has led some academics and groups of the German public to interpret the emergence of hip-hop in German pop culture as "cultural imperialism": that is to say, as a movement that emulated the culture of the United States at the expense of their native German cultural traditions. The influence of American hip-hop artists remains strong even in today's German-language hip-hop scene: music videos rely on similar symbols of power and affluence, such as cars and jewelry.

Many German hip-hop artists are of Turkish-German or Arab-German descent, often second- and third-generation German citizens who grew up in comparatively poor or "tough" neighborhoods, which has become an influential hip-hop narrative. Identification with their roots in neighborhoods remains an important aspect of the identity of individual rappers and their "crews".

When not rapping in English, many German rappers employ a dialect of German developed in these communities and which is therefore associated with immigrants and the German "ghetto". Using this language in their music, some academics have argued, enables them to levy criticism and protest aspects of society and politics that they perceive as having disadvantaged them and their communities.

Die Fantastischen Vier (the Fantastic Four) are another important German hip-hop group, who also began to rap in German around the same time as Advanced Chemistry. Die Fantastischen Vier saw English-language rap in Germany as meaningless loyalty to "surface elements" of U.S. rap, and devoid of any German political or social context. They sought to appropriate hip-hop from its foreign framework and use it to bring a voice to historical and contemporary problems in Germany. The shift of rapping from English into German increased hip-hop's appeal to the German people, Gastarbeiter (guest workers) included. Growing self-confidence among Germany's immigrant population coincided with the use of the German language in German hip-hop, and provided them with a vocal outlet in line with the plight of poor African Americans, out of which hip-hop had originally emerged.

The Group Advanced Chemistry originated from Heidelberg, Germany. As they were one of the few early hip-hop groups to rap in English, they were extremely influential in promoting the hip-hop scene in Germany. More importantly, however, Advanced Chemistry was a prominent hip-hop group because of the ethnic diversity of the members. Torch, the leader of the group, is, for instance, both of a Haitian and German ethnic background. Advanced Chemistry exploded onto the German hip-hop scene in November 1992 with their first mixed single entitled "Fremd im eigenen Land" ("Foreign in Your Own Country"). This song was immensely popular because it directly addressed the issue of immigrants in Germany: "In the video of the song, a band member brandishes a German passport in a symbolic challenge to traditional assumptions about what it means to be German. If the passport is not enough, the video implies, then what is required? German Blood?".

After the reunification of Germany in 1990, many Germans saw a growing wave of racism. Because many hip-hop artists were children of immigrants, this became a major theme of German hip-hop.

During the 1980s, Germany first saw a wave of second generation immigrants coming into the country. Immigration became a big issue in hip-hop albums at this point. The German synonym for an immigrant is Gastarbeiter, which means guest worker, and these guest workers were rapped about often. Immigrant teenagers commonly use rap and hip-hop as a way to defend themselves in their new countries. "Since honour cannot be gained, but only lost, a permanent readiness to fight is required. Thus, social approval is acquired by actually defending one's honour or by exhibiting abilities such as the willingness to face physical encounter, talkativeness, and humour... According to the rules of the game, the first one to whom nothing clever comes to the mind is the loser. This concept is quite similar to 'dissing' in rap."

=== 1990–1995 ===
In 1991, the German music label Bombastic released the record Krauts with Attitude: German Hip Hop Vol. 1. The album featured fifteen songs – three in German, eleven in English, and one in French. The album was produced by DJ Michael Reinboth, a popular hip-hop DJ at that time. Michael Reinboth moved to Munich in 1982 and was the first DJ to introduce Garage House and Old school hip-hop music to the Munich club scene. His compilation Krauts with Attitude is considered one of the first German hip-hop albums, as it features Die Fantastischen Vier. The title refers to N.W.A (Niggaz with Attitude), one of the most controversial hip-hop groups of the time in the United States. Krauts with Attitude was the first album to nationalize German hip-hop, and its album packaging reflected this. "The cover was designed in the colours of the national flag (black, red and yellow), and the liner notes read as follows: 'Now is the time to oppose somehow the self-confidence of the English and the American.'"

In the early 1990s, hip-hop established itself in the mainstream, and many new rappers emerged on the scene. One such band was Die Fantastischen Vier, four rappers from Stuttgart, whose optimistic sound and lighthearted lyrics have brought them fame both in Germany and abroad. Apparently, original crew members Smudo and Thomas D were inspired to begin rapping in German following a six-month visit to the United States. It became apparent that they had nothing in common with U.S. rappers and their essentially middle-class upbringing was foreign to that of the cultural environment of U.S. hip-hop. "The group subsequently decided to concentrate on issues they saw around them, using their own language, rather than aping American styles."

Although Die Fantastischen Vier achieved commercial success and helped to pioneer hip-hop music in Germany, they were criticized for sounding "too American." The group's lack of socially conscious topics and simplistic delivery and material informed the ways in which they were viewed as a trite pop group.

During 1992–93 many acts of protest occurred in the wake of rising anti-immigration sentiment in Germany. Amongst the angst of this period, the content of German hip-hop started to become more politicized. Additionally, the language of the music started to reflect a more local voice. The group Advanced Chemistry has been noted as one of the first to incorporate social critiques of growing prejudice and racism in Germany. "…the newly emerging hip-hop movement took a clear stance for the minorities and against the marginalisation of immigrants who, as the song said, might be German on paper, but not in real life" In 1992 the group released the single "Fremd im eigenen Land". The song dealt with the widespread racism that non-white German citizens faced. In the same year, another rock-hip-hop collaboration emerged. The punk rock band Die Goldenen Zitronen, together with the US-American rapper Eric IQ Gray and the hip-hop group Easy Business, released the maxi-single "80 000 000 Hooligans", which includes a rap version of their song "80 Million Hooligans". The song addressed the nationalism and hatred against foreigners that emerged in Germany after the reunification.

During the inception of hip-hop into Germany, most popular hip-hop artists have come from West Germany. This could be because of the large immigrant population there at the time. "By 1994, the number of immigrants living in Germany had reached 6.9 million. 97 per cent of all immigrants were resident in the western part of the country, which meant that in the former Federal Republic of Germany and in West Berlin every tenth citizen was a foreigner." Of those 97% of immigrants in the Western part of Germany over 1.5 million of them originated from a European country. For example, the community with the largest number of immigrants (roughly 1.9 million people) was the Turkish community. Within the Turkish community, only 5% of its people were of age 60 or older. Such statistics give justification for why hip-hop may have flourished in Germany; many of the people were young. Furthermore, German hip-hop, much like many other countries, was heavily influenced by the Western world. During that time, a rise in anti-immigrant feelings resulted in acts of arson and murder against the Turkish asylum seekers. In May 1993, 5 Turkish people were killed and many injured when someone attacked the home of a Turkish family with a firebomb. In 1993 German hip-hop "globalized" with the emergence of Viva's Freestyle; the equivalent to the American Yo! MTV Raps show. Viva's freestyle consisted of hip-hop songs from the United States, United Kingdom, and Germany. The influx of immigrants into Germany caused an adverse effect on employment and wages. It was found that immigrants and native Germans were imperfect substitutes for each other, while old and new immigrants were interchangeable, exposing an inelastic labor market.

In the mid-1990s, German hip-hop was growing. John Clarke used the term 'recontextualization' to describe the process of borrowing cultural ideas and integrating them into a new society. German hip-hop did just this as it took US hip-hop and gave it a new meaning and identity in German culture. Black American gangsta rap, however, is not the only type of rap that has developed in Germany. Some of the most innovative rap music in Germany is made by Germans or by underground crews dedicated to rap for both political and artistic reasons. Rap has been able to succeed in Germany not just due to a different national culture from the U.S., but also because people are responding to other racial and ethnic cultures. At this time, in the mid-1990s, the ratio of imports and domestic rap was 70% import to 30% domestic, but domestic rap was increasing rapidly. CDs had practically taken over the market in Germany, and cassettes were almost out and were just used for black copies. German hip-hop was yet to have a specific identity as different styles occurred due to ethnic and musical background.

=== 1995–2000 ===
This was also a time when a lot of immigrants were moving to Germany and they all came with their own culture, which contrasted with or added to that of Germany.

Karakan also emerged in the German hip-hop scene. In 1991, Alper Aga & Kabus Kerim formed the group in Nuremberg, Germany, as an offshoot of the hardcore rap group King Size Terror, which included Alper and rapper/producer Chill Fresh. That year, they released the first-ever Turkish language rap track, named "Bir Yabancının Hayatı" (Life of a Foreigner). Two years later, they released classic tracks like "Cehenneme Hoşgeldin" (Welcome to Hell) and the controversial "Defol Dazlak" (Begone Skinhead), which was released as a Maxi Single. "Big Porno Ahmet" joined the group as a producer/beatmaker. Shortly, the success of Karakan spread beyond the borders of Germany, and the group started to get well known within the European hip-hop scene. During jams, they met Cinai Sebeke (Da Crime Posse) and Erci-E. Together, they established the legendary group CARTEL and released a compilation album in 1995. In 1997, KARAKAN finally released his first official album "Al Sana Karakan" and shot 2 videos, which marked a high point in Turkish hip-hop.

The multilingual and multinational group TCA- The Microphone Mafia is an example of 'Oriental Hip Hop in the German Diaspora'. They combine Spanish, Italian, Turkish, and German raps with live music and samples of traditional music from all the previously named countries.

=== 2000 to present ===
In October 2006, what is thought to be the first US-released commercial compilation of German hip-hop (and reggae), Big Up Berlin was released in the US. It received 4.5 of 5 stars in All Music Guide (now known as All Music) and featured artists such as Bushido, Fler, Kool Savas, Azad and others.

Today, the German hip-hop scene is a reflection of the many dimensions that Germany has come to represent in a unified image of Europe. Everything from "migrant hip-hop," which is known as hip-hop from the large Turkish immigrant population, to the more humour-based groups paint a portrait of a vibrant and diverse hip-hop community in Germany.

Despite common notions of the Old School German hip-hop's emulation of US hip-hop styles and the New School's attempt to rap about crime and violence, some "Old Schoolers" feel that the New School has, in fact, forgotten about its roots. Old School supporters and Scholars disagree on the nature of the recent transformation in German hip-hop. Scholars have argued that the Old School German hip-hop "scene was musically and vocally oriented to American role models. Rhymes were written in English; funk and soul samples dominated musical structures". However, Old Schoolers themselves contend that it is the New School German rap artists who have been "Americanized," and therefore lack the authenticity of the struggle of the ghetto in West Germany. The German old school acknowledged that there were many differences between the situation in the United States and the situation in Germany, and aimed at expressing the concept of "realness," meaning to "be true to oneself". Different from the US hip-hop's equating "realness" with a tougher "street credibility," many raps that came out of the old school German hip-hop "address this issue and reject unreflected imitation of US hip-hop as clichés and as the betrayal of the concept of realness". Furthermore, the Old School of German hip-hop may have been seen as representing "a critique of White America" because of its modeling after US hip-hop; however, Old schoolers dispute that hip-hop in Germany was about the oppression of people in Germany. One Old School artist, DJ Cutfaster lamented that, "Most people have forgotten that hip-hop functions as a mouthpiece against violence and oppression and ultimately against the ghetto, which has become the metaphor for the deplorable state of our world". Contrary to the New School hip-hop's attempts to crossover into the mainstream popular culture, the Old School "envisioned and propagated hip-hop as an underground community that needed to keep its distance from and to create resistance to mainstream culture in order to avoid co-optation".

== Artists ==
=== German rappers with most No. 1 on German album charts ===
(as of June 2026)

12 albums

- Kollegah

10 albums

- Bushido

9 albums

- Kontra K
- RAF Camora

7 albums

- Bonez MC
- Farid Bang
- Casper

6 albums

- Cro
- Fler
- Gzuz
- Kool Savas

=== German rappers who reached No. 1 on German single charts ===
22 Singles

- Capital Bra

12 Singles

- Samra

11 Singles

- Apache 207

9 Singles

- Bonez MC

8 Singles

- Luciano

6 Singles

- Loredana
- Mero
- RAF Camora
- Shirin David

Other artists

- Azad
- Marteria
- Sido
- Kay One
- Kollegah
- Farid Bang
- Bausa
- Olexesh
- Ufo361
- Bushido
- RAF Camora
- Gzuz
- Eno
- Luciano
- Trettmann
- Gringo
- Shindy
- KC Rebell
- Summer Cem
- Kalazh44
- Nimo
- Zuna
- AK Ausserkontrolle
- Jamule
- Kasimir1441
- Namika
- Juju
- Hava
- Céline
- Elif
- Katja Krasavice
- Badmómzjay
- Kitty Kat

=== Other influential and successful artists ===
- Kurdo
- Xatar
- Haftbefehl
- Capo
- Eko Fresh
- Veysel
- Alpa Gun
- Mert
- Hasan K.
- Metrickz
- KMN Gang (rappers: Azet, Nash, Zuna, Miami Yacine)
- SXTN (rappers: Juju, Nura)
- Celo & Abdi
- Dú Maroc
- MC Rene
- Hanybal
- Said
- MoTrip
- Baba Saad
- Moe Phoenix
- Tony D
- Mudi
- Massiv
- Ali Bumaye
- PA Sports
- Kianush
- Fard
- SSIO
- SadiQ
- Casper
- Alligatoah
- Dendemann
- Prinz Pi
- Ferris MC
- Curse
- Favorite
- Hollywood Hank
- 187 Strassenbande (rappers: Bonez MC, Gzuz, Maxwell, LX, Sa4)
- Beginner (rappers: Jan Delay, Denyo)
- Fünf Sterne deluxe (rappers: Das Bo, Tobi Tobsen)
- K.I.Z. (rappers: Tarek, Nico, Maxim)
- Advanced Chemistry (rappers: Torch, Toni L, Linguist)
- Manuellsen
- Nate57
- Samy Deluxe
- Afrob
- B-Tight
- J-Luv
- Moses Pelham
- Taktloss
- Dardan
- RIN
- Sun Diego
- Genetikk
- Vega
- Bass Sultan Hengst
- Schwesta Ewa
- Money Boy
- Chakuza
- Nazar
- Denots Crew

== See also ==
- List of German hip-hop musicians
