= Kraut (surname) =

Kraut is a German-language surname. Notable people with the surname Kraut include:

- Bojan Kraut, a Slovene engineer
- Dominik Kraut, a Czech football player
- Laura Kraut, an American show jumping competitor
- Ogden Kraut (1927-2002), American author
- Richard Kraut, American professor
- Robert E. Kraut, an American social psychologist

== See also ==
- Kraut
- Kraut (disambiguation)
