= Blauer Samt =

Studio album by Torch
- Released: September 25, 2000; September 30, 2011 (Re-release)
- Recorded: Piemont-Studios, Heidelberg
- Genres: German hip hop; conscious rap; boom bap; alternative hip hop
- Length: 71:52
- Labels: V2 Records Inc. 360° Records
- Producers: Frederik Hahn; Bülent Teztiker; Detlef Rick; Frero

Torch chronology
Gewalt oder Sex (2000)	Blauer Samt (2000)	Die Welt brennt/Wir waren mal Stars (2001)

Blauer Samt (German for Blue velvet) is the debut album by German hip hop artist Torch. It released in September 2000 by the labels V2 Records and 360° Records.

On September 30, 2011, the album was re-released as CD and vinyl.

Blauer Samt is regarded as one of the most important German hip hop albums. The German rap albums Grüner Samt by Marsimoto (2012, “Green velvet”), Lila Samt by Sookee (2014, “Purple velvet”) and Normaler Samt by Audio88 & Yassin (2015, “Normal velvet”) are named after it.

Professional ratings
Review scores
Source	Rating
Laut.de	4/5 stars
Laut.de (2011)	5/5 stars
Musikexpress	5/6 stars

== Track listing ==
No.	Title	Length
1.	"Kapitel 29" ("Chapter 29")	2:54
2.	"Die Welt brennt" ("The world burns", feat. Gente Guasta)	4:08
3.	"Interlude 1"	0:24
4.	"Gewalt oder Sex" ("Violence or sex")	3:29
5.	"Wir waren mal Stars" ("We used to be stars")	3:03
6.	"Interlude 2"	1:25
7.	"Als ich zur Schule ging" ("When I went to school" feat. Advanced Chemistry)	5:25
8.	"Interlude 3"	0:26
9.	"Wer bin ich" ("Who am I" feat. Toni L)	3:06
10.	"Der flammende Ring" ("The flaming ring")	2:25
11.	"Blauer Schein" ("Blue bill")	4:28
12.	"Hey Mädel" ("Hey girl")	4:10
13.	"In deinen Armen" ("In your arms")	5:17
14.	"Heute" ("Today")	1:09
15.	"Ich hab geschrieben" ("I wrote")	4:07
16.	"Blauer Samt"	4:12
17.	"Heute Nacht" ("Tonight" feat. Boulevard Bou)	5:23
18.	"Zeig mir den Weg" ("Show me the way")	5:01
19.	"Interlude 4"	0:22
20.	"Auf der Flucht" ("On the run" feat. Eek-A-Mouse)	6:08
21.	"Rote Wellen" ("Red waves" feat. Ebony Prince, Esa & Toni L)	4:17
22.	"Shaolin" (feat. Frero)	2:29
23.	"Morgen" ("Tomorrow")

== Samples ==
"Kapitel 29"

- "A Life (1895 - 1915)" by Mark Hollis

"Gewalt oder Sex"

- "It's a Man's Man's Man's World" by James Brown

"Wir waren mal Stars"

- "Fantasy" by Maynard Ferguson

"Als ich zur Schule ging"

- "If Only We Knew" by John Handy
- "The Bridge" by MC Shan

"Hey Mädel"

- "Dreaming About You" by The Blackbyrds

"Ich hab geschrieben"

- "Water Moon" by Andreas Vollenweider

"Blauer Samt"

- "Sehr fern" by Klaus Kinski
- "Allein" by Klaus Hoffmann
- "Night Streets - Sandy and Jeffrey" by Angelo Badalamenti

"Heute Nacht"

- "Long Red" (Live) by Mountain

"Morgen"

- "Tomorrow Started" (Live) by Talk Talk

== Personnel ==
Credits for Blauer Samt

- Arranged By – Torch (tracks: A5, A6)
- Producer – Boulevard Bou (tracks: B2, B5, C3), Torch (tracks: A1 to A3, A5, A6, B3, B4, B6 to C2, C4 to D5)
- Recorded By, Mixed By – Boulevard Bou

== Sources ==
- Discogs.com
- Whosampled.com
