= Fremd im eigenen Land =

Fremd im eigenen Land may refer to:

- Fremd im eigenen Land (album), a 2008 album by Fler
- "Fremd im eigenen Land" (song), a song by Advanced Chemistry
