= SAMT =

SAMT may refer to:

- Samara Time, the time zone 4 hours ahead of UTC
- SAMT (organization), the Organization for Researching and Composing University Textbooks in the Humanities

== People ==
Wilma Samt, Austrian chess master

== See also ==
- Blauer Samt, an album by Torch
