= Eek-A-Mouse =

Jamaican reggae artist

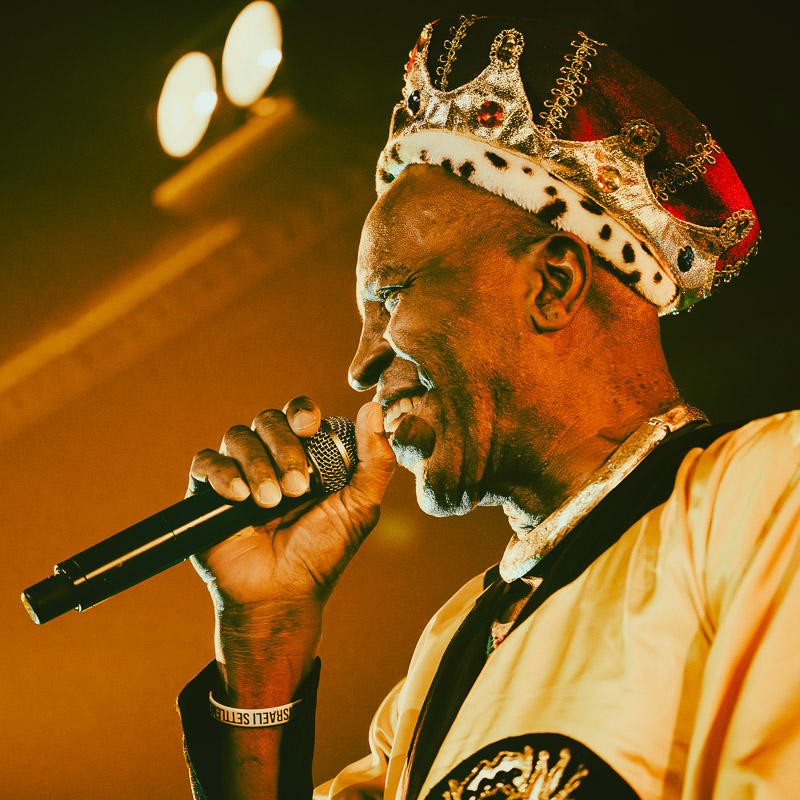
- Eek-a-Mouse (Ripton Joseph Hylton), Burgerweeshuis, Deventer, The Netherlands, 31-01-2025 - by Raymond Rothengatter

Background information
- Born: Ripton Joseph Hylton; 19 November 1957 (age 68)
- Origin: Kingston, Jamaica
- Genres: Reggae, dancehall
- Years active: 1975–present

Ripton Joseph Hylton (born 19 November 1957), known artistically as Eek-A-Mouse, is a Jamaican reggae musician. He is one of the earliest artists to be described as a singjay. (Note: Eek-A-Mouse often softly disregards notions of himself being a deejay and singjay in live-performances, especially during his prime in the 1980s.) He is known for pioneering his own style of scatting, differing from the-then toasting deejays in the 1980s. Apart from his distinctive vocal style, Eek-A-Mouse has been noted for often wearing flashy and eccentric costumes during his performances. In a 1985 interview, he explained: "Entertaining is not just singing and rapping to audiences. People want to see you in costume and dancing."

== Early life, family and education ==
Ripton Joseph Hylton was born in Kingston, Jamaica. He attended college.

== Career ==
Hylton began his music career when he was in college, releasing two roots reggae singles under his own name, which were produced by his mathematics tutor, Mr. Dehaney. These early works were influenced by the music of Pablo Moses. Hylton worked for various sound systems over the next few years and also released a few more singles. He adopted his stage name in 1979 after betting on a racehorse of that name; it was a nickname his friends had used for some time. He began recording for Joe Gibbs in 1979, having a hit straight away with "Once a Virgin", now showing the influence of Ranking Joe, and this was soon followed with "Wa-Do-Dem" (produced by Douglas Boothe), and "Modelling Queen", which began an association with Linval Thompson, who produced his debut Bubble Up Yu Hip album.

By the end of 1980, he was working with producer Henry "Junjo" Lawes, with whom he had big hits in 1981 with the likes of "Virgin Girl" and a recut "Wa-Do-Dem". In 1981, he was the star of the Reggae Sunsplash Festival, cheering audiences still mourning over the death of reggae icon Bob Marley. His association with Lawes led to a string of successful singles and albums, and in 1982 his hits included "Wild Like a Tiger", "For Hire and Removal", "Do You Remember", and "Ganja Smuggling". The same year he released his second album, Wa Do Dem. The "Operation Eradication" single showed Hylton's serious side, the song inspired by the vigilante killing of close friend and fellow DJ Errol Shorter. Skidip was released before the year was out.

Further albums followed: Mouse and the Man (1983), produced by Linval Thompson, and Mouseketeer (1984), produced by Junjo Lawes. Eek-A-Mouse also featured on several of the live dancehall albums from the era, including the Aces International and Live at Skateland collections. In the second half of the decade his popularity began to wane slightly, and he targeted the United States with the Assassinator album in 1985 (his first US release), produced by Anthony and Ronald Welch. He also travelled to the United Kingdom to record The King and I the same year, the album targeted at the rock crossover audience to which he had begun to appeal.

His 1988 album Eek-A-Nomics saw him begin to establish himself with an international audience, spawning a club hit with "The Freak", and he was signed by Island Records in 1989. He returned to prominence with 1991's U-Neek album, which continued the rock-oriented style, including a cover version of Led Zeppelin's "D'yer Mak'er", and from which the hit single "You're The One I Need" was taken. He went through a period of relative quietness before returning in 1996 with the Black Cowboy album.

He also has a performance in the 1991 gangster movie New Jack City, playing a drug-dealing Rastafarian named Fat Smitty. That same year, he also had a performance in Out for Justice playing a chauffeur of a pimp.

Eek-A-Mouse was a regular performer at Reggae Sunsplash, often teaming up with reggae duo Michigan & Smiley. An album of their 1982 performance was released by Sunsplash Records.

He performed in Jamaica for the first time in eight years in August 2015 at the Marcus Garvey Festival in Ocho Rios.

== Collaborations ==
Eek guests on Roger Kellaway's 1984 release Creation, contributing his voice to the title track. He was also featured on nu metal group P.O.D.'s album Satellite, lending his vocals to the rock-reggae track "Ridiculous." He can also be heard on OPM's album, ForThemAsses, on the track "Perfect Day." Eek-A-Mouse recorded a song with hip-hop recording artist Ditch, called "Smoke it up" (2007, released in 2009), which is featured on Ditch's CD Public Intoxication. The song by Ditch and Eek-a-Mouse is featured on the Jack Herer documentary as well. Eek was featured with background vocals on the hit single "Khaki Suit", also featuring Bounty Killer, from the Grammy-award-winning album Welcome to Jamrock by Damian Marley. Eek was also part of the recording of one of the most important German hip hop albums Blauer Samt by Torch (German rapper). He can be heard on the track "Auf der Flucht" ("On the run"). He collaborated with Canadian band Bran Van 3000 in 2001 on the track "Go Shoppin'" on their Discosis album.

== Personal life ==
As of 2021, Eek-A-Mouse had lived in Sweden with his partner since 2017. He has eight children: five live in the US, and three live in Jamaica.

=== Legal issues ===
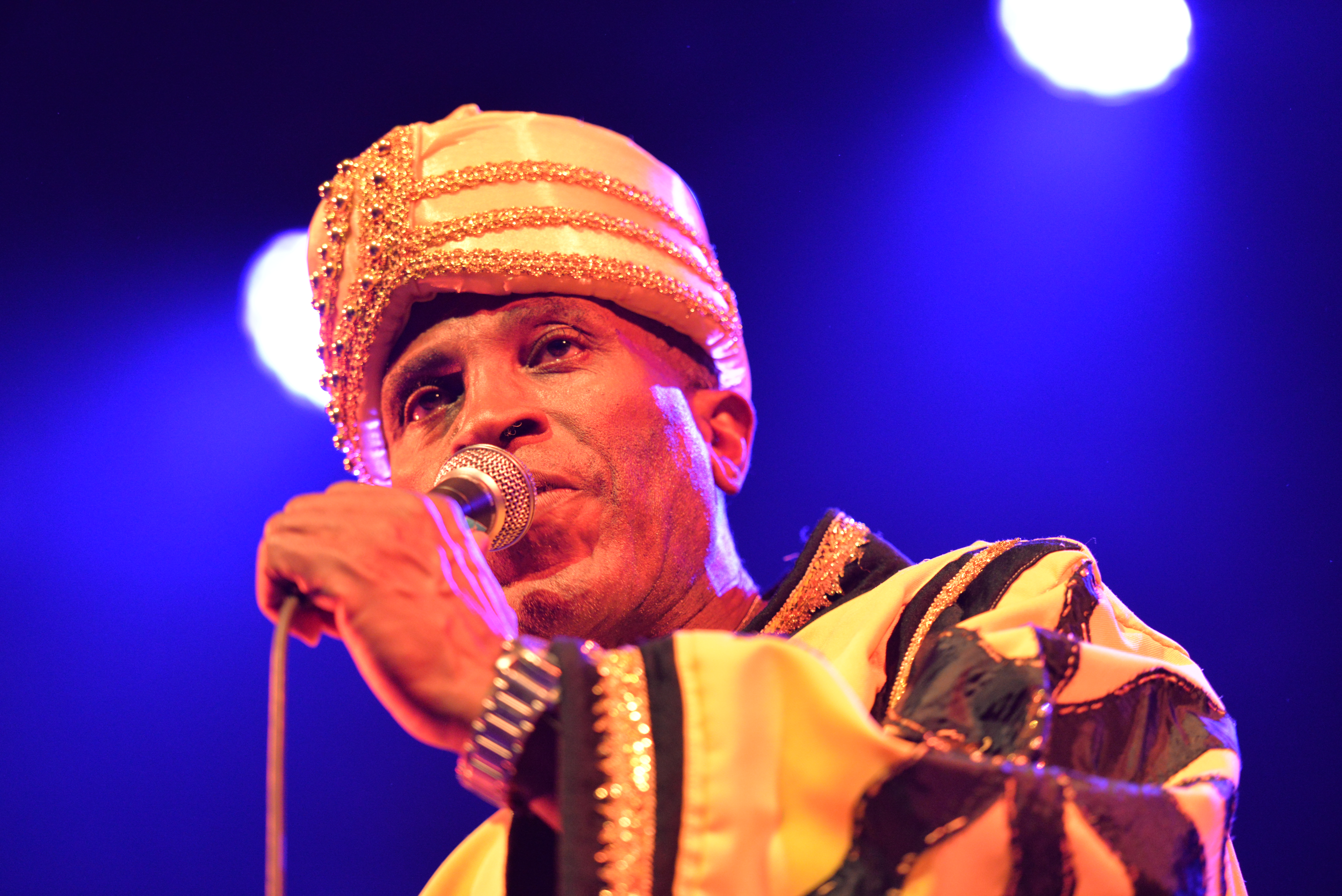
Eek-A-Mouse performing in 2019

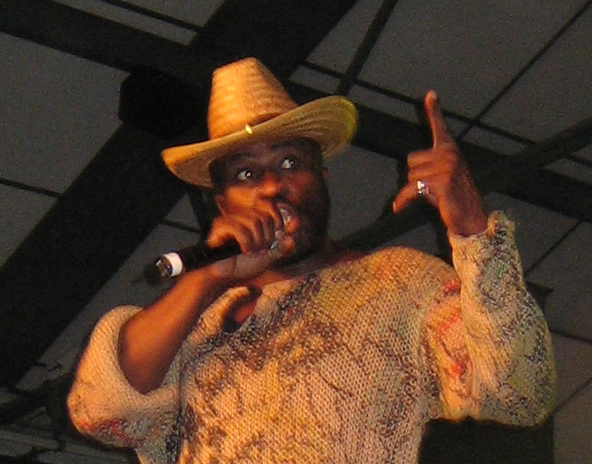
Eek-A-Mouse performing in 2006

On 16 August 2008, Eek-a-Mouse was arrested on charges of rape and narcotics possession in Dare County, North Carolina after a performance at the Port O'Call restaurant. Having fled the US, he failed to appear at his first hearing, so the court issued an "order to arrest". with a US$1 million bond issued. He was discovered to be in the Netherlands in 2010, but was unable to travel due to either an expired visa or the volcanos in Iceland.

On 21 November 2012, Eek-a-Mouse was found in Paraguay without a proper visa and was eventually extradited to the US. He was charged with felony rape, felony kidnapping, felony cocaine charges and misdemeanor relating to possession of marijuana. In July 2013 he was released after a plea agreement, having pleaded no contest to misdemeanor charges for assault on a female and attempted crime against nature, with his time already spent in jail covering his sentence. He was deported to Jamaica.

== Discography ==
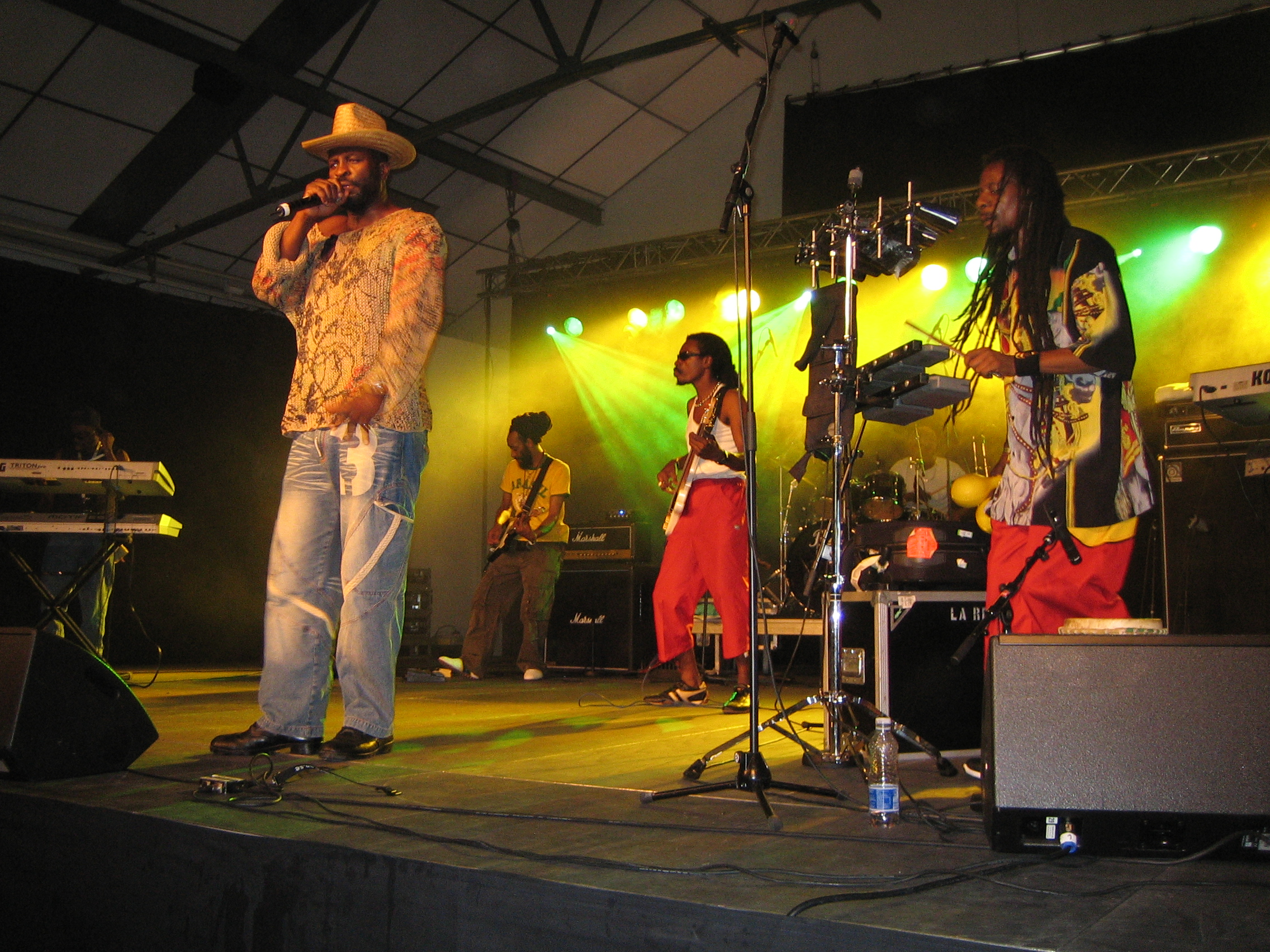
Eek-A-Mouse with band performing in 2006

Studio albums

- Bubble Up Yu Hip (1980), Greensleeves
- Wa-Do-Dem (1981), Shanachie
- Skidip! (1982), Shanachie
- The Mouse and the Man (1983), Shanachie
- Assassinator (1983), RAS
- Mouseketeer (1984), Greensleeves
- The King and I (1985), Original Sounds/(1986), RAS
- Eek-A-Nomics (1988), RAS
- U-Neek (1991), Mango
- Black Cowboy (1996), Explicit
- Eeeksperience (2001), Coach House
- Mouse Gone Wild (2004), Sanctuary
- Eek-A-Speeka (2004), Greensleeves
- Eekziled (2011)
- Put Food On The Ghetto Youth Table (2022), Irie Ites

Live albums

- Live At Reggae Sunsplash (1983), Sunsplash (with Michigan & Smiley)
- Live in San Francisco (2006), 2B1

Compilations

- Mouse-A-Mania (1987), RAS
- The Very Best Of (1987), Greensleeves
- Ras Portraits (1997), RAS
- At His Best (1998)
- The Very Best Of Vol.2 (2003), Shanachie
- Most Wanted (2009), Greensleeves
- Ganja Smuggling (2009)
- Reggae Anthology: Eek-Ology (2013), VP

== See also ==
- Hyman Wright
