= Toni L =

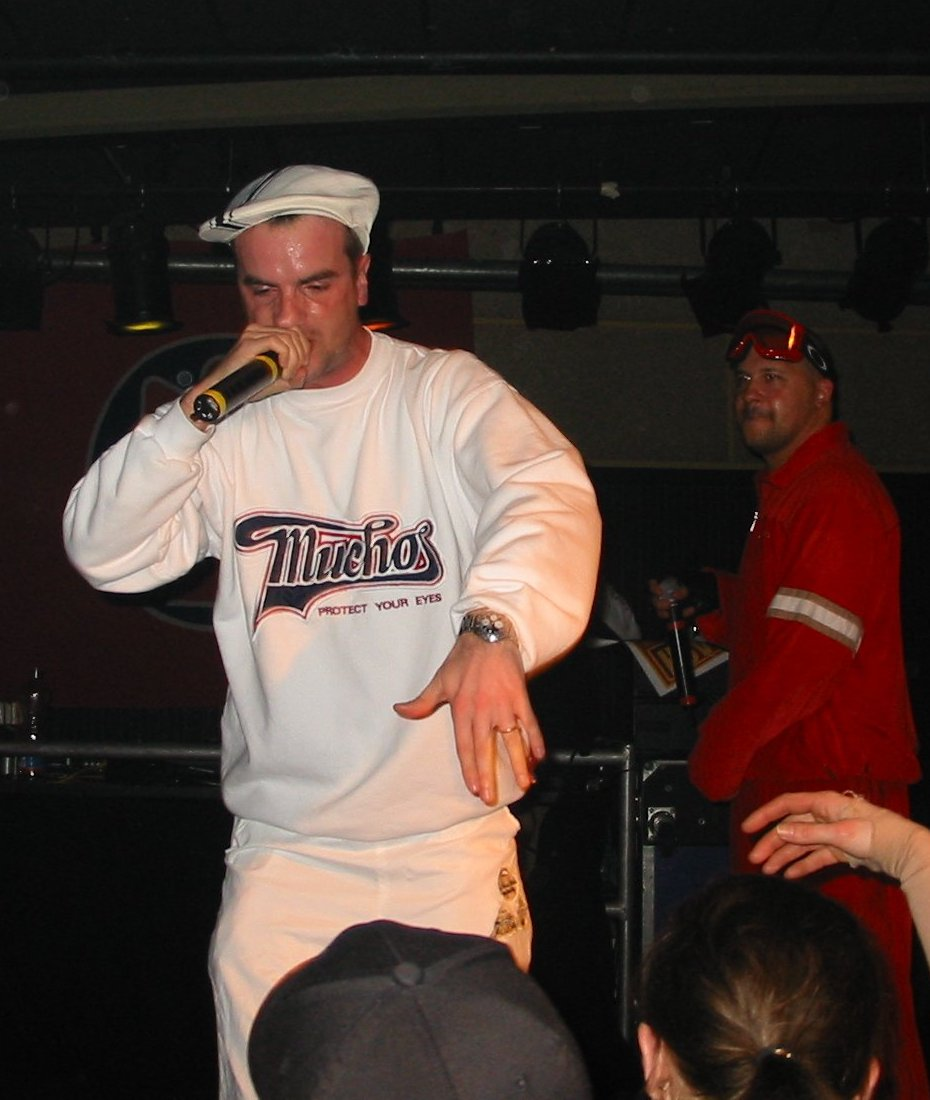
- Toni L in 2004

Background information
- Born: Toni Landomini
- Origin: Germany
- Genres: German hip hop
- Years active: 1980s-present

Toni Landomini, better known as Toni L, is one of the three artists comprising the German rap group Advanced Chemistry formed in 1987. He is often referred to as “der pate” or “the Godfather,” Toni holds German citizenship but has an Italian background. His Italian roots provide him with material for his rap songs, such as in Advanced Chemistry’s hit single “Fremd Im Eigenen Land” (A Foreigner In My Own Country), where the group discusses the struggle to be accepted as a German. Toni has produced solo releases, beginning with his debut “Der Pate,” hence leading to his nickname. He has also founded the German hip-hop label MZEE.

== Discography ==
=== Solo ===
- 1997 – Der Pate
- 2000 – Der Funkjoker
- 2005 – Der Zug rollt (Toni L & Def Cut)
- 2007 – Funkanimal (Toni L & Safarisounds)

=== With Advanced Chemistry ===
- 1992 – Fremd im eigenen Land
- 1993 – Welcher Pfad führt zur Geschichte?
- 1994 – Operation Artikel 3
- Dir fehlt der Funk
- 1995 – Advanced Chemistry

=== Features ===
- 1997 - "Ha - Ha!" by Otierre (Album: Dalla Sede)
- 2000 – "Wir waren mal Stars", "Wer ich bin" (Who I am), "Rote Wellen" (Red waves), "Als ich zur Schule ging" (When I went to school) by Torch (Album: Blauer Samt)
- "Zimmer 101" (Room 101) by Peripherique
