= Kraut Canyon =

Valley in Lincoln County, United States of America

Coordinates: 33.4673°N 105.7405°W

Kraut Canyon is a valley in Lincoln County, New Mexico, in the United States.

A large share of the early settlers being natives of Germany led to the valley to be called Kraut Canyon, from the ethnic slur "kraut".
