= Schwesta Ewa =

Polish rapper based in Germany

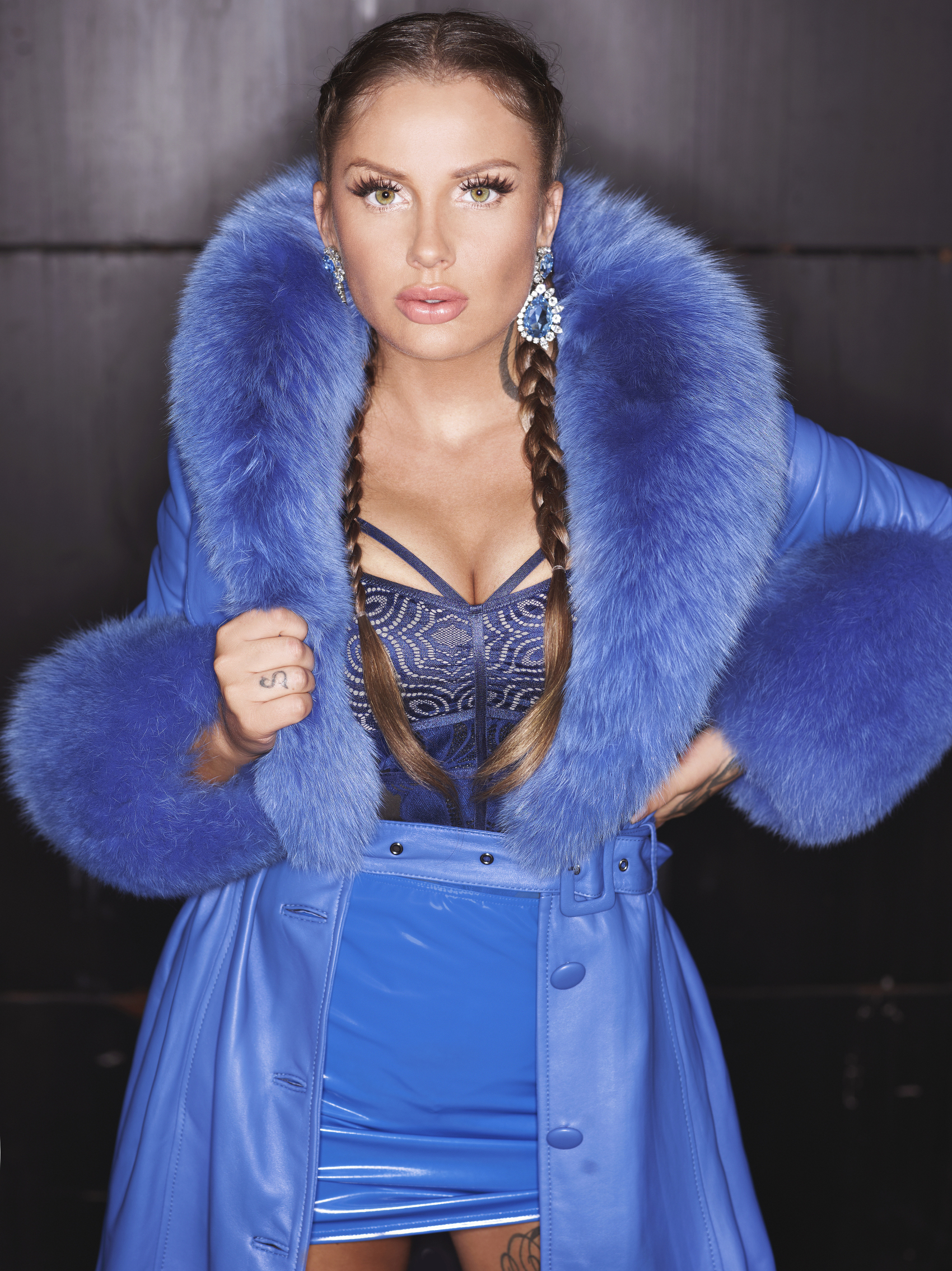
- Schwesta Ewa in 2019

Background information
- Also known as: Ewa Malanda; Ewa Müller
- Born: 16 July 1984 (age 42); Koszalin, Poland
- Origin: Frankfurt, Germany
- Genre: German hip hop
- Occupation: Rapper
- Years active: 2012–present
- Label: Alles oder Nix

Ewa Malanda (formerly Ewa Müller; born 16 July 1984), known under her stage name Schwesta Ewa, is a German rapper of Polish descent.

Ewa's family was stranded in Germany while en route to the United States when she was a child. She rose to fame in Frankfurt, where she originally moved in order to work as a prostitute. While working, she met the rapper Xatar, who signed her to his record label, and her first album, Kurwa, reached number 11 on the German album chart.

In November 2016, Ewa was arrested and later convicted of bodily harm, abuse of minors and tax violations in connection with the prostitution of five of her fans, some of whom were underage. She was released in February 2021.

== Early life ==
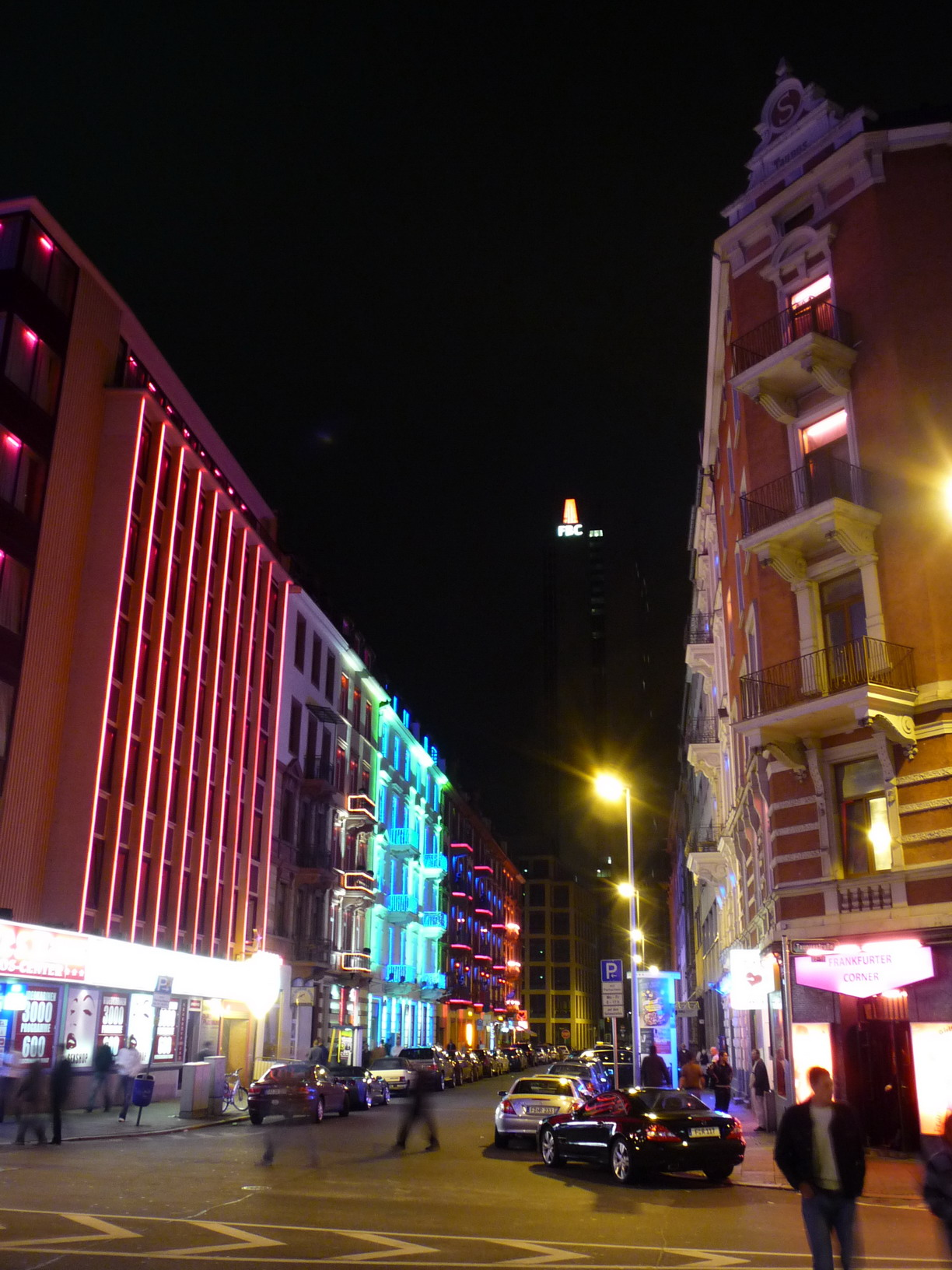
Frankfurt red-light district. Ewa worked at Rotes Haus, seen on the left of this image.

Ewa Müller was born 16 July 1984 in Koszalin, Poland, into a family of different religious beliefs. She is an atheist. Her father was arrested and imprisoned on the charge of murder while Ewa's mother was pregnant, and so Ewa spent the first three years of her life in hiding – her mother feared that the family of the victim would attack her in revenge.

When Ewa was 3 years old, her mother left Poland and headed for West Berlin, with the aim of seeking asylum in the United States. Her mother was approved for a Green Card but was then convicted of theft. The Green Card was withdrawn, leaving the family stranded in Germany. Ewa grew up in a refugee home, and later a women's shelter, in Kiel, Schleswig-Holstein, at the time in West Germany. Her mother married a German man, and Ewa took her stepfather's surname, Müller. Ewa has two brothers born in Germany, who know that she worked as a prostitute. Ewa's mother does not know about her career, and she is no longer in contact with her father.

At the age of 16, Ewa began working as a bartender at a bar in Kiel's red light district, while studying at a Realschule (the middle rank of high school in the German school system) to become an occupational therapist, but failed her final exam, which Ewa subsequently attributed to smoking cannabis.

Ewa began sex work at the brothel in the back of the bar. She then moved to Bonn, and then on to Frankfurt's Bahnhofsviertel red light district. Her alias there was "Anja", for which she adopted a false Polish accent. There, she was able to earn €20,000–30,000 a month as a prostitute, but also became addicted to crack cocaine. Suffering under its effects, her looks deteriorated and her earnings began to decrease, until she was forced to give up cold turkey.

== Career ==
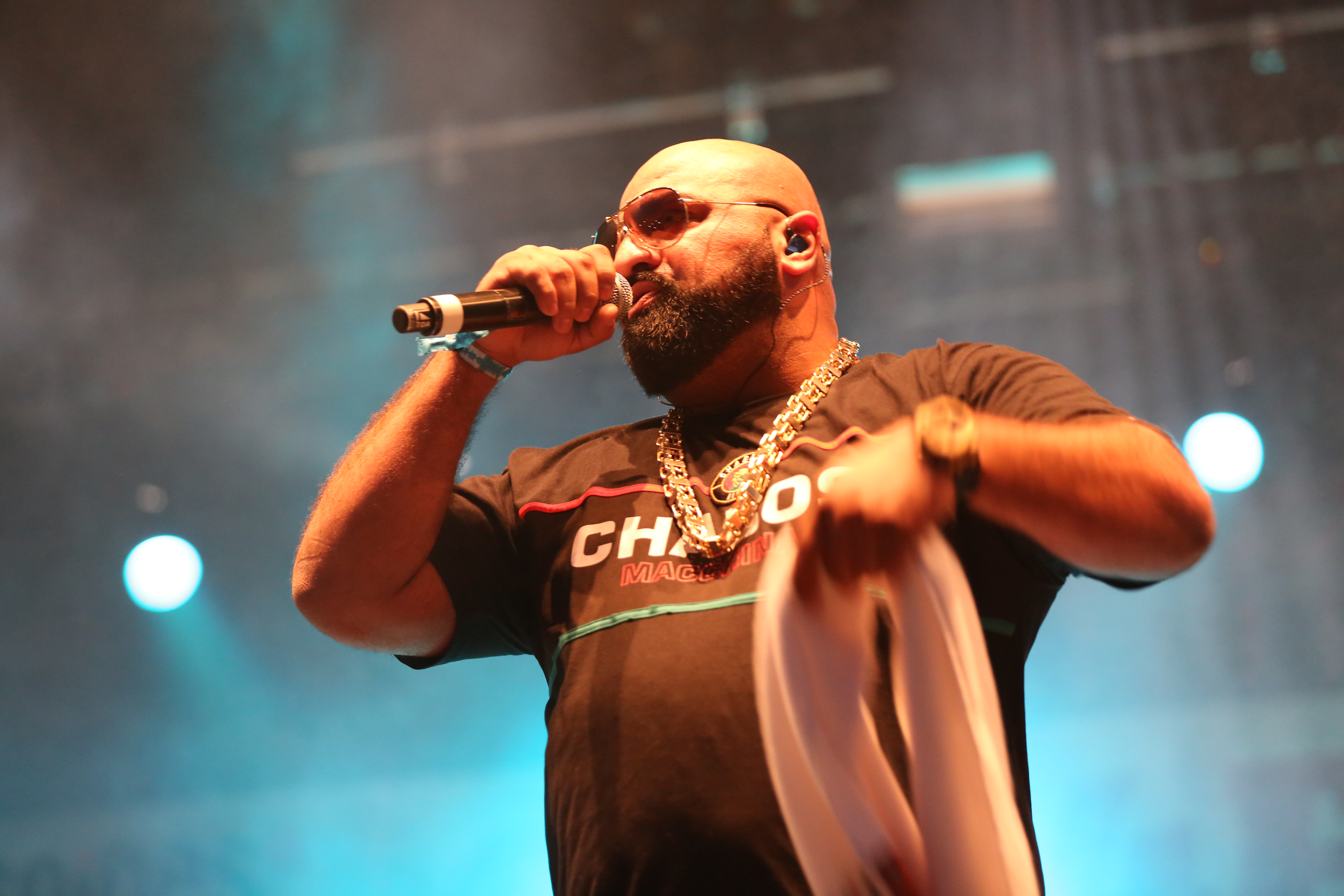
Xatar, Ewa's mentor and label boss

Her breakthrough came at a party in Bonn, where she met the rapper and record label boss Xatar. Xatar was impressed by her voice and became her friend. He later signed her and became her mentor, sending her to London to practice her rapping.

In December 2009, Xatar and seven accomplices robbed €1.7 million of gold from a transporter lorry. Xatar fled to Iraq, where he was caught and arrested in February 2010. Xatar's flight and subsequent arrest impacted Ewa's career – she found herself "twiddling her thumbs", unable to share her tracks with him. However, she also decided that she would not go back to prostitution – her promotion as a rapper meant that she was now famous, and she was worried about returning to drugs. She has described rap as a form of music therapy, helping her work through her past.

With Xatar running his record label from prison, Schwesta Ewa eventually managed to appear on the song "Beifall" from Xatar's album 415 and on "Frauen" on Hinterhofjargon by Celo & Abdi. Her first mixtape, Realität ("Reality") was released on 5 October 2012. No tracks from Realität charted, but her first music video, "Schwätza" ("Small Talker") received over six million views on YouTube. After the release of the "Schwätza" video in 2011, Ewa gave up prostitution to become a full-time artist.

Her debut album, Kurwa (from the Polish kurwa, both a slang term for "whore" and a general-purpose expletive; formerly Dr. Entjungferung ("Dr. Deflowering", with "Dr" also standing for "Deutschrap")) was released in January 2015 and reached number 11 in the German album charts.

=== Lyrical content ===
Many of Schwesta Ewa's songs cover scenes from her life as a prostitute, and she describes herself as a storytelling rapper; topics include being attacked by johns, and being forced to watch the rape of a friend.

Ewa has described herself as uncomfortable on stage and sometimes suffers stage fright. She therefore prefers to rap straight through, without banter or comic routines. However, she is accompanied on tour by strip dancers who perform as she sings.

== Bar and arrest ==
Alongside her rap career, Schwesta Ewa opened a bar in Central Frankfurt, Stoltze. The bar was raided by police on suspicion that it was an illegal brothel, prompting an angry response from Ewa who wrote on Facebook "This is a bar, not a brothel! [...] I will open a legal brothel in two months. It will pay taxes etc. Don't worry!"

At 8:30 AM on 16 November 2016, Ewa was arrested by a SEK police tactical unit in Oeventrop, a district of Arnsberg, North Rhine-Westphalia where she was recording her new album. She was detained at JVA Frankfurt-Preungesheim on charges of human trafficking for sexual exploitation, pimping, bodily harm, and offenses against the German tax code. Ewa had been under investigation by the organised crime department of Frankfurt Police for several months, and was alleged to have brought young female fans, between the ages of 17 and 19, to a hotel room and offered to lend them money for costs such as rent, clothing, cosmetics and petrol, then forced them into prostitution to repay this debt. Following the arrest, Ewa's record label released a statement that her surname had been changed to Malanda. On 20 June 2017, Malanda was found guilty of 35 counts of bodily harm, tax violations and the abuse of minors, and was sentenced to 2 years and 6 months. She was cleared of pimping and human trafficking, on the grounds that the girls had become prostitutes of their own free will. Malanda's appeals to the Federal Court of Justice (German: Bundesgerichtshof) were rejected.

In February 2021, Malanda announced via Instagram that she had been released from prison early for good behavior, having served two-thirds of her sentence. She said that her three-year-old daughter, Aaliyah Jeyla Malanda, had suffered trauma due to being away from her mother.

== Discography ==
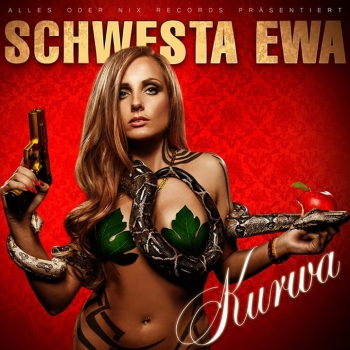
Cover of Kurwa (2015)

=== Studio albums ===
Title	Release	Chart position		
Title	Release	GER	AUT	SWI
Kurwa	Released: 9 January 2015; Label: Alles oder Nix Records; Formats: CD, digital download, streaming, box set	11	28	34
Aywa	Released: 1 June 2018; Label: Alles oder Nix Records; Formats: CD, digital download, streaming, box set	8	20	26
Aaliyah	Released: 31 January 2020; Label: Alles oder Nix Records; Formats: CD, digital download, streaming, box set	5	25	—

=== Mixtapes ===
- 2012: Realität (Alles oder Nix Records)

=== Singles ===
- 2018: Schubse den Bullen
- 2018: Mein Geständnis
- 2018: Tabledance (with SXTN)
- 2018: Alles nur Show (with Bonez MC)
- 2019: Cruella
- 2019: Tokat
- 2020: Bang Bang
- 2020: Mama iz da
- 2022: Mehr Eier (with XATAR)

=== Other releases ===
- 2021: Break Ups (Krankfurt Remix) [with Senna Gammour, LIZ]
