= U-Neek =

Studio album by Eek-A-Mouse
- Released: 1991
- Recorded: 1990–1991
- Genre: Reggae
- Length: 50:22
- Label: Island
- Producer: Glenn "Daddy-O" Bolton, Matt Robinson, Augustus "Gussie" Clarke

Eek-A-Mouse chronology
Mouse-A-Mania (1989)	U-Neek (1991)	Black Cowboy

"Border Patrol"
Border Patrol audio sample

U-Neek is an album by the Jamaican reggae artist Eek-A-Mouse, released in 1991. He supported the album with a North American tour. "You're the Only One I Need" was released as a single.

== Production ==
The album was produced primarily by Glenn "Daddy-O" Bolton, Matt Robinson, and Augustus "Gussie" Clarke. It includes a cover of Led Zeppelin's "D'yer Mak'er". "Border Patrol" is about the Immigration and Naturalization Service. "Rude Boys a Foreign" concerns drug trafficking. "No Problem" involves Eek-A-Mouse leading nations and solving hunger crises. "So Fine" contains a sample of "Spinning Wheel".

== Critical reception ==
Professional ratings
Review scores
Source	Rating
AllMusic	3/5 stars
The Encyclopedia of Popular Music	3/5 stars

Newsday wrote that "U-Neek is full of oddities, from an apparently sincere love song ('You're the Only One I Need') to 'Gangster Chronicles', which features the Eekster rapping—or toasting—his own lyrics to part of the 'Theme from The Godfather'." The Boston Globe determined that "the album moves faster than most reggae purists would like, but Eek-A-Mouse delights and informs while breaking new musical ground." The State noted that Eek-A-Mouse "can toast and rap with the best of the dance-hall sing-jays, then turn around and croon a romantic melody like a rasta Sinatra."

== Track listing ==
No.	Title	Length
1.	"Yc"	4:58
2.	"Love Me"	6:04
3.	"D'yer Mak'er"	4:06
4.	"Get Away"	4:28
5.	"Gangster Chronicles"	4:55
6.	"So Fine"	4:47
7.	"Border Patrol"	6:14
8.	"Rude Boys a Foreign"	5:33
9.	"No Problem"	5:38
10.	"Let the Children Play"	4:07

== Personnel ==
- Eek-A-Mouse – vocals
- Glenn "Daddy-O" Bolton – various instruments
- Danny Lipman – guitar, trumpet
- Paul Vercesi – alto saxophone
- Danny Moynahan – saxophone
- Anthony Brewster – trumpet
- I. Timothy – trombone
- Dean Fraser – horns, vocals
- Matt Robinson – keyboards, vocals
- Robbie Lyn, Handel Tucker, Jamie Carse, Michael Hyde – keyboards
- Danny Brown, Vere Isaacs – bass
- Danny Drum, Carl Wright – drums
- Keene Carse – drum programming, trombone
- Johnny Rivers – drum & synthesizer programming
- Dave Tobocman – programming, vocals
- Kevin O'Conner, Tommy James, Debra Falconer, Mikey Bennet, J.C. Lodge, Tony Gold – background vocals
- Producers: Daddy-O, Matt Robinson, Keene Carse, Sidney Mills, Augustus "Gussie" Clarke, Johnny Rivers
- Engineers: Kevin O'Conner, Butch Jones, Rob Sutton
