= Krauts with Attitude =

Compilation album by various artists
- Released: 1991
- Genre: Hip hop

Krauts with Attitude was released in 1991 under the Bombastic label. The album was compiled by DJs Michael Reinboth and Katmando. It features 15 different acts; three rapped in German, eleven in English, and one in French. This release was the first compilation of German hip-hop, and essentially helped create a hip-hop scene in Germany.

== Background ==
The album was controversial for its language and disrespect towards authority. The title of the album refers to Niggaz with Attitude (N.W.A.), a hip-hop group from California, and the word "kraut," which is derogatory slang for German people. N.W.A. is widely considered a seminal gangsta rap group. Their lyrics are controversial, and Krauts with Attitude provided a German counterpart to the American rap scene. The Krauts record was influential to future German artists who wanted to make it in German hip-hop.

The album cover was designed in the colors of the nation’s flag (black, red, and gold), a move that was mimicked by the Turkish hip hop group Cartel. The group supported this underlying nationalism with the linernotes reading "Now is the time to oppose somehow the self confidence of the English and the American."

== See also ==
- German hip hop
