= The Denots Crew =

TDC
- The Denots Crew
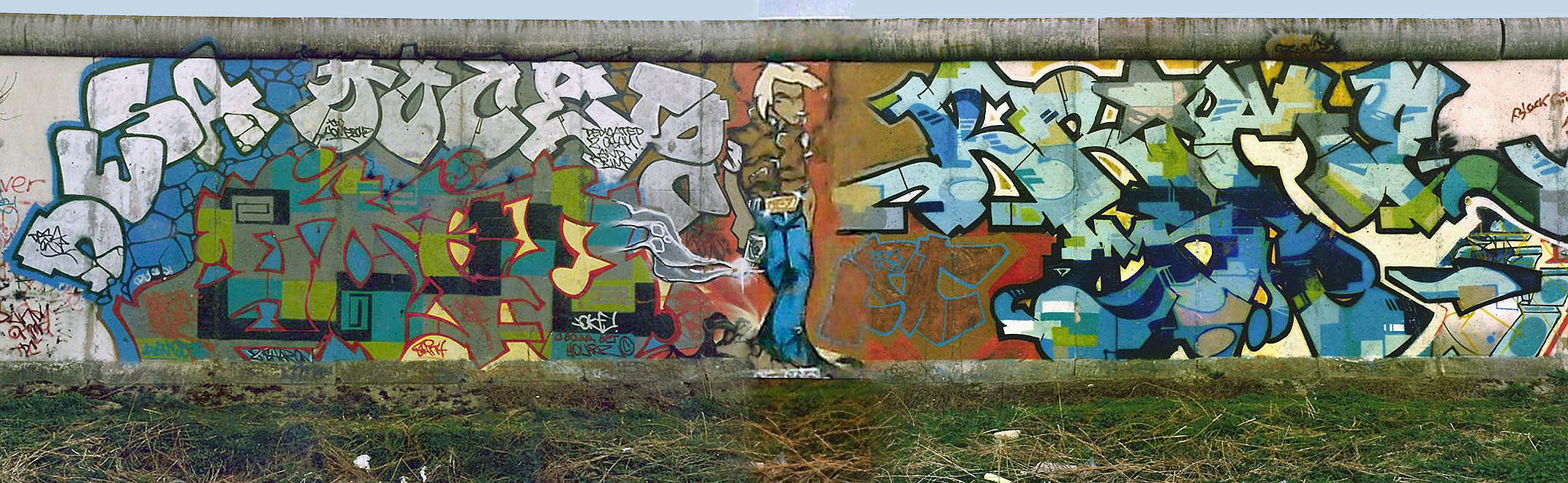
- Pieces by TDC on the Berlin Wall, 1988
- Abbreviation: TDC
- Predecessor: TU3; The Denots Crew; Ku-Damm; Razzia
- Formation: 1982; 44 years ago
- Founded at: Märkisches Viertel, Reinickendorf
- Type: Graffiti crew
- Purpose: Vandalism
- Location: Berlin, West Germany

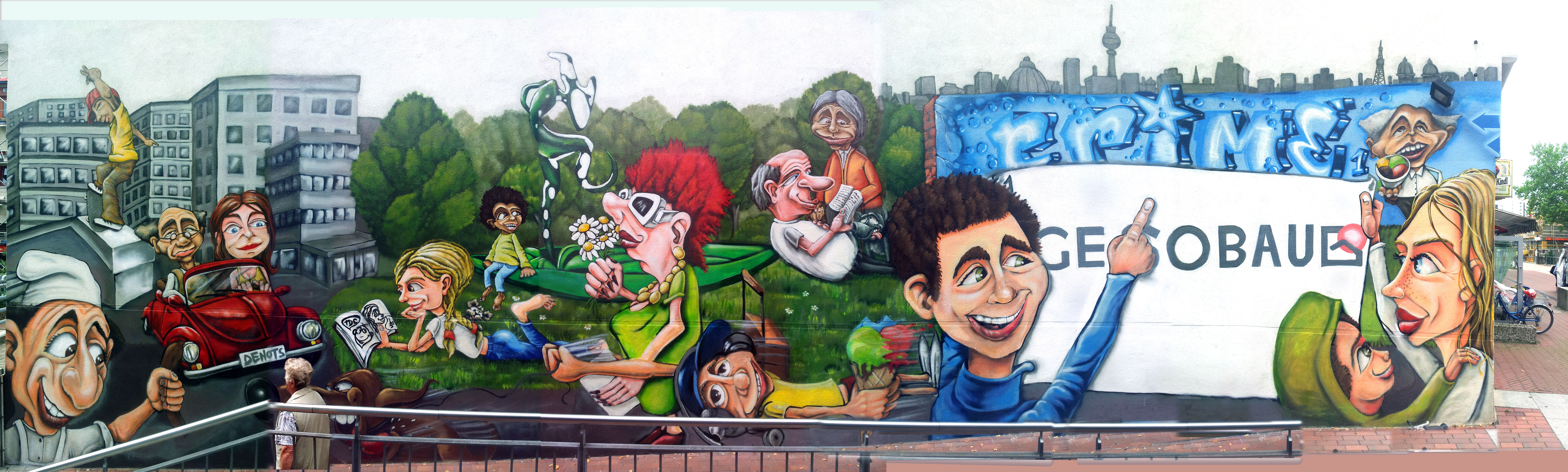
Mural by Crime, 2012

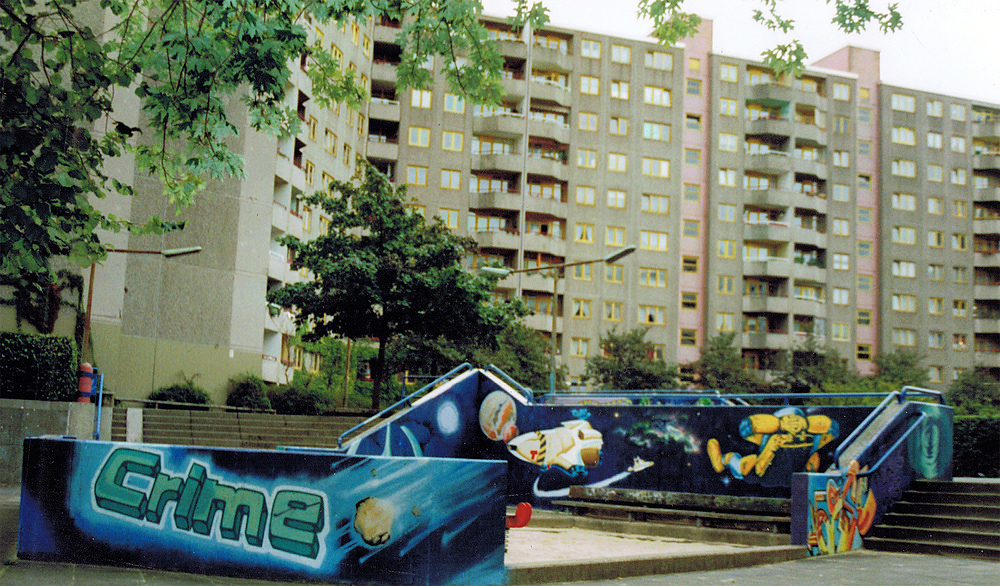
Mural Street Art by Crime 1997

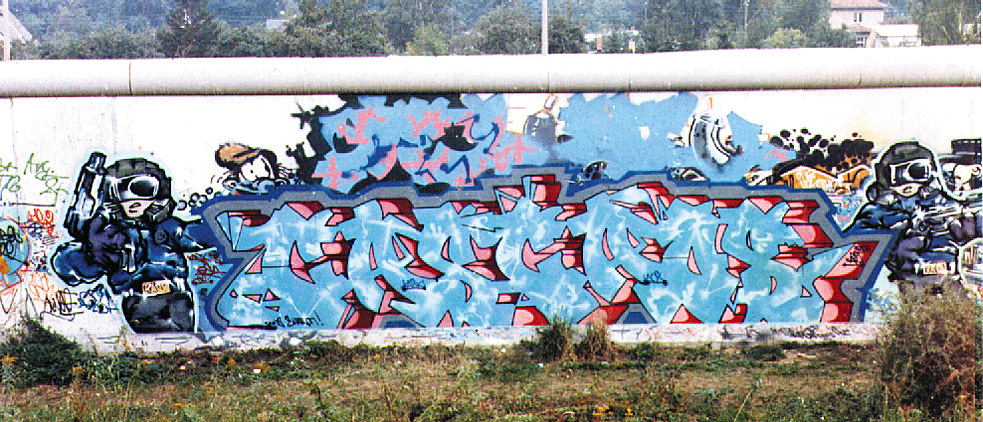
CASCAOS TDC Berlin Wall, 1987

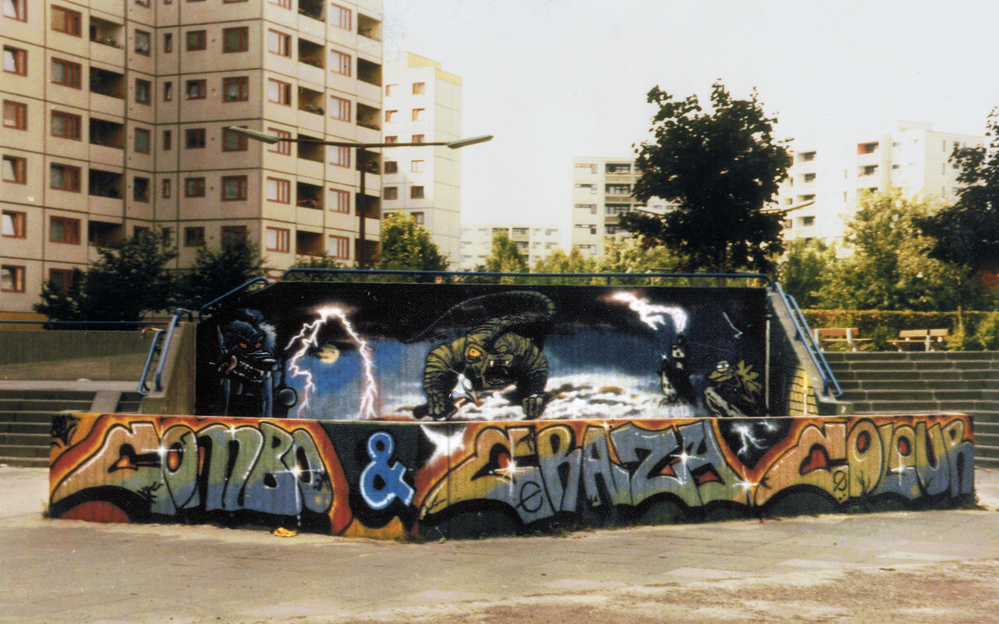
Denots Crew Mural 1986

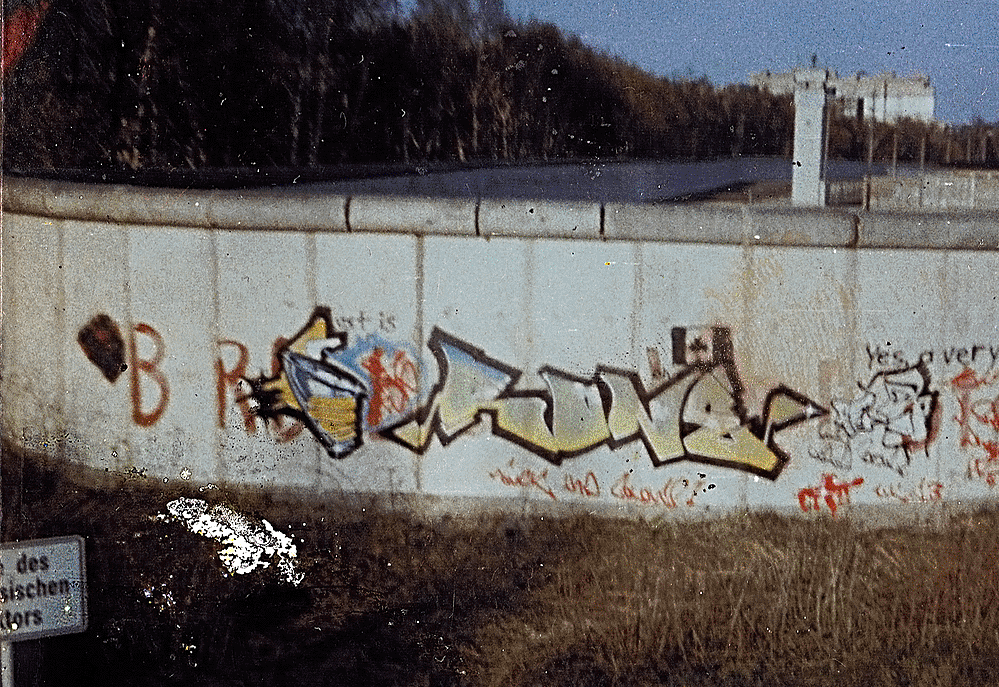
Rone Denots Crew - Berlin Wall Graffiti 1985

The Denots Crew (TDC) is a group of international street artists, musicians and dancers. Their artwork and music productions pushed Berlin Hip-Hop- and Graffiti History since 1982 to Europe's main cities of today.

== HISTORY ==
- Graffiti - group "The Unknown 3" (Deza aka Combo, Crime, Crazy Colour, from 1985 Rebel and since 1987 Kaos)
- German Rap-group: "The Denots Crew"
- German Breakdance Group "Ku-Damm"
- German Punk Rock Band "Razzia"

Those 4 groups started separately but became one as TDC because of their affinity to Skateboarding and their neighbourhood Märkisches Viertel, a large housing estate in the north of Berlin.

== Beginning "The Early Days 1980s" ==
At the beginning of the 1980s, West Berlin was still surrounded by the Berlin Wall. American hip-hop had hardly been seen on the streets of Europe. But it changed suddenly. Nearly at the same time. And all over Europe's main cities like Berlin, Paris, London and Amsterdam. In Berlin TDC started with breakdance shows in a popular tourist area known as Ku'damm. They painted the first street art on the Berlin Wall in 1983, which became the original East Side Gallery later on. In 1986 TDC met up with Keith Haring while he painted a 100 m section of the Berlin Wall. TDC continued experimentally and started the integration of American hip-hop into Berlin's youth culture. Just like other pioneers of Europe's hip-hop culture such as Mode2 in London, Shoe in Amsterdam and Ash from the Bad Boys Crew in Paris.

== Denots Crew Today ==
From the early 1990s most TDC members have been involved in various social or commercial projects worldwide. Many original TDC artworks are still extant, inside and outside Berlin. For example: A segment of the Berlin Wall on display at the Ronald Reagan Presidential Library in Simi Valley, California, 2004 Art by Kaos. A Berlin Wall art relic in Bedok Reservoir Park in Singapore. 2010 Artist: Kaos. Today TDC is named and known as the pioneers of the Berlin hip-hop scene.

== Sources ==
- Berlin, le mur vit; Christian Bourguignon (ua.) ; Editions de l´est;1990, ISBN 2-86955-090-1
- "Hallo Nachbar" Press 1997, Denots Crew commercial Mural Project
- Interview: Rebel MC. 25 years German Hip Hop Scene, Schwarzkopf & Schwarzkopf, 2000
- "Style 1983 Graffiti by Crime TDC". 2009 Goethe-Institut Stockholm "Graffiti and other Art on the Berlin Wall" by Johannes Stahl

== press and printed articles ==
- TV Show german channel NDR in 1986 All about the graffiti group "Unknown 3": Crazy Colour, DEZA, Crime
- Berliner press Article 19.05. 1999 Graffiti - Art or vandalism
- "Rock News 1989"
- Interview with Crime „Die Mauer“, DTV Verlag 2011. Covergraffiti by Crime
- Interview of Crime , Berliner Zeitung 2002
- Berliner Stadtmagazin TIP Article Berlin HipHop Scene in 1987
- 25years german Hip Hop Scene "Bei uns geht einiges" Schwarzkopf & Schwarzkopf Verlag
- Märkisches Viertel Newspaper MV Express 1986 "Graffiti wurde übermalt"

== Concerts ==
- Berlin Old School Revival Concert 2008
- Konzertplakat mit Rebel und Lady Zue, 1989
- "Rock News 1989"
- "The Denots Crew / Quartier Latin 1988"

== Music Productions and Releases ==
- Gotta Rock Tape 1986
- Rebel One

== Biographies and portfolio of Denots Crew Members today ==
- Deza (Graphic Design)
- Panter a.k.a. Crime (Graphic Design / Street Art Artist)
- Kaos (DJ and Art)
- Streetstyler.org (International Street Art )
- Rebel One (MC + Rapper)
- Phet One (Street Art Artist)
