= Mouse-A-Mania =

Compilation album by Eek-A-Mouse
- Released: 1987
- Recorded: Aquarius Studios, Kingston, Jamaica, Gooseberry Studios, London, England
- Genre: Reggae
- Label: RAS Records Inc.
- Producer: Clifton Carnegie

Eek-A-Mouse chronology
The King And I	Mouse-A-Mania	Eek-A-Nomics

Mouse-A-Mania is the eight studio album by Jamaican reggae singer Eek-A-Mouse. The album is a collection of two of The Mouse's prior albums The Assassinator (1983) and The King And I (1985).

== Track listing ==
No.	Title	Length
1.	"Juicy Juicy & Weedy Weedy"	3:25
2.	"Assassinator"	3:52
3.	"Safari"	3:25
4.	"Penni-Walli"	3:52
5.	"I Like Them All"	4:17
6.	"Posse"	3:27
7.	"Triple Love"	3:18
8.	"De Di Doo"	4:15
9.	"Now I Know"	3:52
10.	"Gun Shot a Cry"	4:40
11.	"Mi Brethren Roach"	5:07
12.	"Crime"	3:51
13.	"Macho Man"	4:14
14.	"Some a Holler, Some a Bawl"	3:27
15.	"Born Traveller"	3:24
