= Rock Da Most =

Rock Da Most was a German-based hip-hop group in Berlin. The group is composed of members DJ Derezone, DJ Run X Kid, MC Roskoe and MC Blacky. Credited with releasing the first record by a West German hip-hop group, Rock Da Most released Use the Posse in 1988 prior to the reunification of West and East Germany. The twelve-inch single was rapped in English and released by a small West Berlin independent label. This type of German hip hop, sonically resembles that which was forged in America.

Birthed by the hip-hop scene in Germany, Rock Da Most, like other hip-hop artists and groups, were influenced by the images of American hip-hop circulating at the time. During the late 1970s to mid 1980s, Germany experienced its short era of an old-school hip hop scene after Charlie Ahearn's 1982 film Wild Style and the 1984 film Beat Street produced by Harry Belafonte. Through the depiction of an African-American/Latino-American youth street culture in America, films like these influenced the hip-hop scene in Germany as well as its manifestation.
