= Torch (German rapper) =

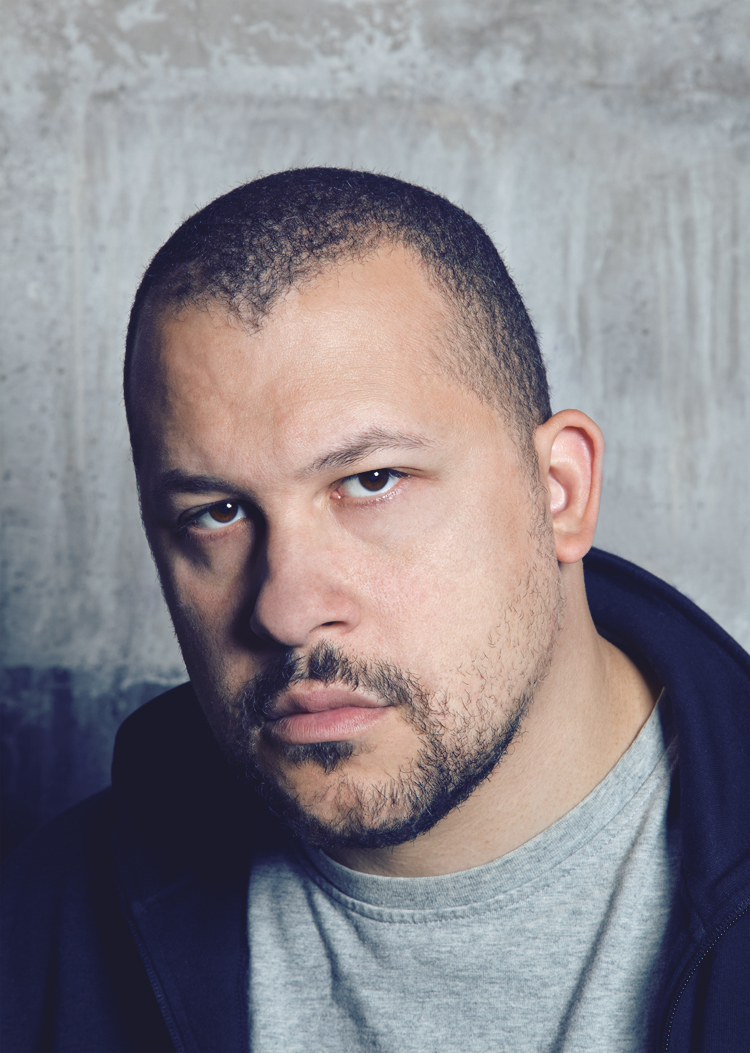
- Torch in 2011

Background information
- Also known as: Torchmann, Torchkinski, DJ Haitian Star
- Born: Frederik Hahn; September 29, 1971 (age 55)
- Origin: Heidelberg, Germany
- Genre: German hip hop
- Years active: 1980s–present
- Member of: Advanced Chemistry
- Website: www.mctorch.de

Frederik Hahn (born September 29, 1971 in Heidelberg), better known by his stage name Torch, is a German rapper. He is also known as DJ Haitian Star. He was among the first German rappers who began rapping in German in the mid-1980s in Heidelberg, laying the foundation for the success of German hip hop music. In 1985, Afrika Bambaataa named him king of the first German chapter of the Zulu Nation and also gave him the title: Overlord of Sound & Culture.

== Career ==
In 1987, Torch founded the group Advanced Chemistry with Toni L, Linguist, Gee-One and DJ Mike MD. In 1992, the song Fremd im eigenen Land ("Stranger in one's own country") became the group's first hit. Primarily due to exposure on the cable television network MTV, the song garnered attention outside of Germany's hip hop scene, which was still quite small at the time.

In 2000 he rapped with KRS-One and MC Rene on DJ Tomekk's Single Return of Hip-Hop, which placed in the German charts for 9 weeks. In the joint video, the hip hop was brought to the hospital in an ambulance and revived by nurses.

Torch's first (and so far only) solo-album was Blauer Samt ("Blue Velvet"), released in 2000.

He worked with international artists like Afrika Bambaataa, Freestyle (Ex-Arsonists), Grandmaster Caz (Cold Crush Bros), Jurassic 5, KRS1 (BDP), Melle Mel, Missing Linx (Al Tariq-Ex Beatnuts), Whipper Whip & Virtuoso (Boston), Fréro-La Mixture (France). After his introduction to Bambaataa, Torch was given the task of heading up the very first German chapter of the Zulu nation as well as collaborating for the socially conscious German hip-hop concert, 'Rap against the Right'. Torch was chosen for these tasks because of his social consciousness as purveyed through his music and lyrics. Advanced Chemistry (and specifically Torch) have expressed the desire to remain largely underground while other German hip hop groups have sought stardom, but a common view shared by these other groups and Torch is their view on "Americanness." Author Timothy Brown cites Torch as stating, "What the American do is exotic for us because we don't live like they do. What they do seems to be more interesting and newer. But not for me. For me it's more exciting to experience my fellow Germans in new contexts... For me it's interesting to see what the kids try to do that's different from what I know."

He is also travelling the World as DJ Haitian Star where he has performed at the Battle of the Year (Germany), Jazz Festival Montreux (Switzerland), Hip Hop Kemp (Czech Republic), Zulu Anniversary (NY/USA),... He shared the decks with DJs like: Z-Trip (US), David Rodigan (UK), Grandmaster Flash (US), Kool Herc (US), Tee (Japan), Supreme/Hijack (UK), Defcut (CH), Stylewarz (D), Marc Hype (D).

2021 Torch published a book by the name "Blauer Samt". And released his own Wine by the same name.

== Discography ==
- 2000: Gewalt oder Sex
- 2000: Blauer Samt
- 2000: Die Welt brennt/Wir waren mal Stars
- 2001: Die Welt brennt/Wir waren mal Stars (Remixe)
- 2001: In deinen Armen
- 2001: Blauer Samt (Instrumentals)
- 2005: Move the Crowd
- 2008: Heidelberg (Mixtape)
- 2009: Mixtape 01
- 2011: Blauer Samt (Re-Edition)
- 2015: Boomshell Bounce EP
