= John R. Clarke (historian) =

American art historian

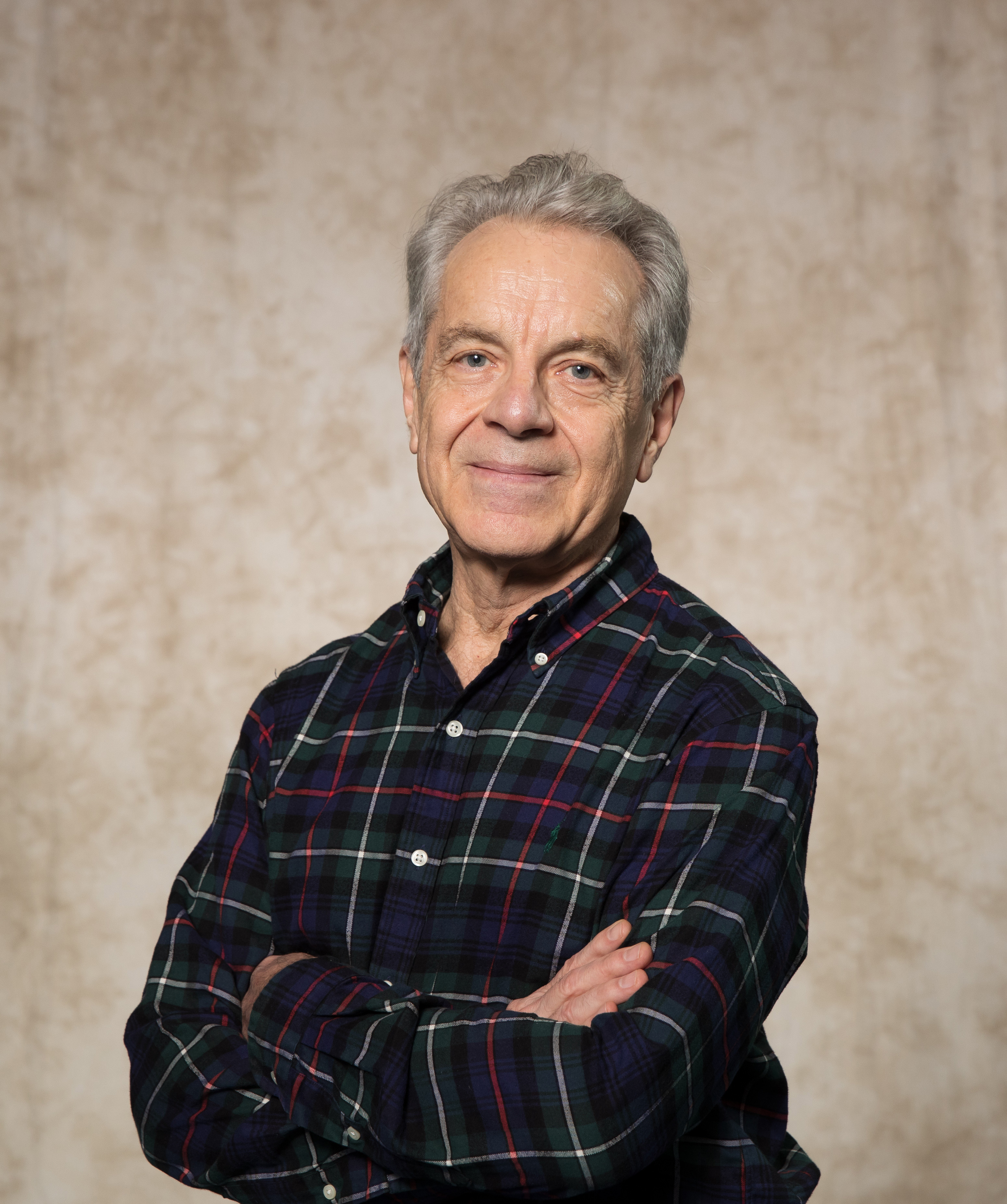
Photographed at the Hamilton Book Awards, University of Texas at Austin, December 2019

John R. Clarke is an American art historian, professor, and author. He is Annie Laurie Howard Regents Professor of Fine Arts in University of Texas at Austin, teaching in the Department of Art and Art History. Clarke (Ph.D. Yale, 1973), joined the University of Texas at Austin in 1980. His research and teaching focus on Roman art and archaeology, art-historical methodology, art of the sixties, and digital modeling.

Clarke was a Trustee of the American Academy in Rome (2011–2013), a member of the board of directors of the American Council of Learned Societies, (2000–2010), and served on the board of directors of the College Art Association (1991–2001—President 1998–2000). He is 2017 recipient of the gold medal for Distinguished Achievement in Archaeology from the Archaeological Institute of America.

== Bibliography ==
- Clarke, John R. (2003), Roman Sex: 100 B.C. to 100 A.D., Abrams, ISBN 9780810942639
- Clarke, John R. (2003), Art in the Lives of Ordinary Romans: Visual Representation and Non-elite Viewers in Italy, 100 B.C.-A.D. 315, University of California Press, ISBN 9780520219762
- Clarke, John R. (2007), Roman life: 100 B.C. to A.D. 200, Abrams, ISBN 978-0810993396
- Clarke, John R. (2007), Looking at laughter: humor, power, and transgression in Roman visual culture, 100 B.C.-A.D. 250, University of California Press, ISBN 9781282357051
- Clarke, John R. (1998), Looking at lovemaking: constructions of sexuality in Roman art, 100 B.C.-A.D. 250, University of California Press, ISBN 9780585327136
- Clarke, John R. (1991),The Houses of Roman Italy, 100 B.C.-A.D. 250: Ritual, Space, and Decoration. Berkeley: University of California Press, ISBN 9780520084292
- Clarke, John R (1979), Roman black-and-white figural mosaics, Monographs on archaeology and fine arts, 35., Published by New York University Press for the College Art Association of America, ISBN 9780271004013
- Clarke, John R. and Nayla K. Muntasser, eds. (2014), Villa A (“of Poppaea”) at Torre Annunziata, Italy (50 B.C.-A.D. 79). Volume 2: The Decorations: Painting, Stucco, Pavements, Sculptures. New York: The Humanities E-Book Series of the American Council of Learned Societies, 2019. Open Access permanent link: Oplontis: Villa A ("of Poppaea") at Torre Annunziata, Italy. Volume 2. The Decorations: Painting, Stucco, Pavements, Sculptures
- Clarke, John R. and Nayla K. Muntasser, eds. (2019),Villa A (“of Poppaea”) at Torre Annunziata, Italy (50 B.C.-A.D. 79). Volume 1: The Ancient Setting and Modern Rediscovery. New York: The Humanities E-Book Series of the American Council of Learned Societies, 2014. Open Access permanent link: Oplontis: Villa A ("of Poppaea") at Torre Annunziata, Italy. Volume 2. The Decorations: Painting, Stucco, Pavements, Sculptures
- Clarke, John R. and Elaine K. Gazda, eds. Leisure and Luxury in the Age of Nero: The Villas of Oplontis near Pompeii (2016), Exhibition catalogue. The Kelsey Museum of Archaeology, University of Michigan, Ann Arbor; The Museum of the Rockies, Montana State University; Smith College, 10 February 2016 – 31 August 2017, Kelsey Museum of Archaeology, ISBN 0990662349
- Clarke, John R. ed. and trans. (2015), The Mediterranean Foundations of Ancient Art. Mittelmeerstudien vol. 4, Critical introduction and first English edition and translation of Guido Kaschnitz von Weinberg, Die mittelmeerischen Grundlagen der antiken Kunst (Frankfurt: Vittorio Klostermann, 1944), Ferdinand Schöningh, ISBN 3506779192
