= Advanced Chemistry =

German hip-hop band

- Origin: Heidelberg, Germany
- Genre: Hip-hop
- Years active: 1987–present
- Labels: MZEE, 360° Records
- Members: Torch; Toni L; Linguist
- Past members: Gee One; DJ Mike MD

Advanced Chemistry is a German hip-hop band from Heidelberg, Baden-Württemberg. It was founded in 1987 by Toni L, Linguist, Gee-One, DJ Mike MD (Mike Dippon) and MC Torch. Each member of the group holds German citizenship, and Toni L, Linguist, and Torch are of Italian, Ghanaian, and Haitian backgrounds, respectively.

Influenced by North American socially conscious rap and the Native tongues movement, Advanced Chemistry is regarded as one of the main pioneers in German hip-hop. They were one of the first groups to rap in German (although their name is in English). Furthermore, their songs tackled controversial social and political issues, distinguishing them from early German hip-hop group "Die Fantastischen Vier" (The Fantastic Four), which had a more light-hearted, playful, party image.

== Career ==
Advanced Chemistry frequently rapped about their lives and experiences as children of immigrants, exposing the marginalization experienced by most ethnic minorities in Germany, and the feelings of frustration and resentment that being denied a German identity can cause. The song "Fremd im eigenen Land" (Foreign in your own nation) was released by Advanced Chemistry in November 1992. The single became a staple in the German hip-hop scene. It made a strong statement about the status of immigrants throughout Germany, as the group was composed of multi-national and multi-racial members. The video shows several members brandishing their German passports as a demonstration of their German citizenship to skeptical and unaccepting 'ethnic' Germans.

This idea of national identity is important, as many rap artists in Germany have been of foreign origin. These so-called Gastarbeiter (guest workers) children saw breakdance, graffiti, rap music, and hip-hop culture as a means of expressing themselves. Since the release of "Fremd im eigenen Land", many other German-language rappers have also tried to confront anti-immigrant ideas and develop themes of citizenship. However, though many ethnic minority youth in Germany find these German identity themes appealing, others view the desire of immigrants to be seen as German negatively, and they have actively sought to revive and recreate concepts of identity in connection to traditional ethnic origins.

Advanced Chemistry helped to found the German chapter of the Zulu nation.

The rivalry between Advanced Chemistry and Die Fantastischen Vier has served to highlight a dichotomy in the routes that hip-hop has taken in becoming a part of the German soundscape. While Die Fantastischen Vier may be said to view hip-hop primarily as an aesthetic art form, Advanced Chemistry understand hip-hop as being inextricably linked to the social and political circumstances under which it is created. For Advanced Chemistry, hip-hop is a “vehicle of general human emancipation”. In their undertaking of social and political issues, the band introduced the term "Afro-German" into the context of German hip-hop, and the theme of race is highlighted in much of their music.

With the release of the single “Fremd im eigenen Land”, Advanced Chemistry separated itself from the rest of the rap being produced in Germany. This single was the first of its kind to go beyond simply imitating US rap and addressed the current issues of the time. "Fremd im eigenen Land", which translates to “foreign in my own country”, dealt with the widespread racism that non-white German citizens faced. This change from simple imitation to political commentary was the start of German identification with rap. The sound of “Fremd im eigenen Land” was influenced by the 'wall of noise' created by Public Enemy's producers, The Bomb Squad.

After the reunification of Germany, an abundance of anti-immigrant sentiment emerged, as well as attacks on the homes of refugees in the early 1990s. Advanced Chemistry came to prominence in the wake of these actions because of their pro-multicultural society stance in their music. Advanced Chemistry's attitudes revolve around their attempts to create a distinct "Germanness" in hip-hop, as opposed to imitating American hip-hop as other groups had done. Torch has said, "What the Americans do is exotic for us because we don't live like they do. What they do seems to be more interesting and newer. But not for me. For me it's more exciting to experience my fellow Germans in new contexts...For me, it's interesting to see what the kids try to do that's different from what I know." Advanced Chemistry were the first to use the term "Afro-German" in a hip-hop context. This was part of the pro-immigrant political message they sent via their music.

While Advanced Chemistry's use of the German language in their rap allows them to make claims to authenticity and true German heritage, bolstering pro-immigration sentiment, their style can also be problematic for immigrant notions of any real ethnic roots. Indeed, part of the Turkish ethnic minority of Frankfurt views Advanced Chemistry's appeal to the German image as a "symbolic betrayal of the right of ethnic minorities to 'roots' or to any expression of cultural heritage." In this sense, their rap represents a complex social discourse internal to the German soundscape in which they attempt to negotiate immigrant assimilation into a xenophobic German culture with the maintenance of their own separate cultural traditions. It is quite possibly the feelings of alienation from the pure-blooded German demographic that drive Advanced Chemistry to attack nationalistic ideologies by asserting their "Germanness" as a group composed primarily of ethnic others. The response to this pseudo-German authenticity can be seen in what Andy Bennett refers to as "alternative forms of local hip hop culture which actively seek to rediscover and, in many cases, reconstruct notions of identity tied to cultural roots." These alternative local hip-hop cultures include oriental hip-hop, the members of which cling to their Turkish heritage and are confused by Advanced Chemistry's elicitation of a German identity politics to which they technically do not belong. This cultural binary illustrates that rap has taken different routes in Germany and that, even among an already isolated immigrant population, there is still disunity and, especially, disagreement on the relative importance of assimilation versus cultural defiance. According to German hip-hop enthusiast 9@home, Advanced Chemistry is part of a "hip-hop movement [which] took a clear stance for the minorities and against the [marginalization] of immigrants who...might be German on paper, but not in real life," which speaks to the group's hope of actually being recognized as German citizens and not foreigners, despite their various other ethnic and cultural ties.

== Influences ==
Advanced Chemistry's work was rooted in German history and the country's specific political realities. However, they also drew inspiration from African-American hip-hop acts like A Tribe Called Quest and Public Enemy, who had helped bring a soulful sound and political consciousness to American hip-hop. One member, Torch, later explicitly listed his references on his solo song "Als (When I Was in School):" "My favorite subject, which was quickly discovered poetry with Last Poets, awakens the intellect or policy at Chuck D I'll never forget the lyrics by Public Enemy." Torch goes on to list other American rappers like Biz Markie, Big Daddy Kane and Dr. Dre as influences.

== Discography ==
- 1992 - "Fremd im eigenen Land" (12"/MCD, MZEE)
- 1993 - "Welcher Pfad führt zur Geschichte" (12"/MCD, MZEE)
- 1994 - "Operation § 3" (12"/MCD)
- 1994 - "Dir fehlt der Funk!" (12"/MCD)
- 1995 - Advanced Chemistry (2xLP/CD)

== Bibliography ==
El-Tayeb, Fatima “‘If You Cannot Pronounce My Name, You Can Just Call Me Pride.’ Afro-German Activism, Gender, and Hip Hop,” Gender & History15/3(2003):459-485.

Felbert, Oliver von. “Die Unbestechlichen.” Spex (March 1993): 50–53.

Weheliye, Alexander G. Phonographies:Grooves in Sonic Afro-Modernity, Duke University Press, 2005.
