= Kraut =

Ethnic slur

Kraut is a German word recorded in English from 1918 onwards as an ethnic slur for a German, particularly a German soldier during World War I and World War II. Its earlier meaning in English was as a synonym for sauerkraut, a traditional Central and Eastern European food.

== Etymological foundations ==
In German, the term means "herb", or designates the leaves and stem of a plant as opposed to the root. The term is more often used in compound nouns for herbs, and also for cabbage and cabbage products:

- Weißkraut = white cabbage (also called Weißkohl)
- Blaukraut or Rotkraut = red cabbage (also called Rotkohl)
- Sauerkraut = fermented white cabbage or 'sour cabbage'
- Unkraut = weed
- Bohnenkraut = savory
- Rübenkraut = thick sugar beet syrup

The plural Kräuter is commonly used (herbs, weeds) when talking about spices, but is often replaced by Gewürz which can refer to any spice.

== Slang ==
It was recorded as a colloquial term for Germans by the mid-19th century. During World War I, Kraut came to be used in English as an ethnic slur for a German. However, during World War I, it was mainly used by British soldiers; during World War II, it became used mainly by American soldiers and less so by British soldiers, who preferred the terms Jerry or Fritz.

== Demonym ==
The Bauer (farmer in German) Krauts were an atom-level hockey team based in Kitchener, Ontario (known as "Berlin, Ontario" prior to the outbreak of World War I); they were active in the 20th century.

== Music ==
Krautrock is a popular term for a form of German experimental rock of the late 1960s and 1970s. Krautrock was typified by acts such as Amon Düül II, Kraftwerk, Neu!, Tangerine Dream, Faust, Can and David Bowie on his "Berlin Trilogy" albums Low, "Heroes", and Lodger, as well as many others.

Kraut was the name of a New York punk rock band in the 1980s. Their song "All Twisted" was the first independent video to air on MTV.

"Magic Kraut" is the name of a song in the album Fresh by Teddybears.

Industrial rock band KMFDM’s song “Kraut” appears on the b-side of their “Juke Joint Jezebel” single, and on their Extra, Vol. 3 compilation.

Krauts with Attitude is the title of the record released in Germany in 1991; it is credited for playing a prominent role in establishing the German hip hop scene.

The Swedish indie rock band Peter Bjorn and John composed the track titled "School of Kraut".

== See also ==
- Krautrock
- List of terms used for Germans
- List of ethnic slurs
