= The Voice of Germany season 14 =

Season of television series

The Voice of Germany
- Season 14
- Promotional poster featuring coaches Haber, Catterfeld, Forster, and Kamrad
- Hosted by: Thore Schölermann; Melissa Khalaj
- Coaches: Mark Forster; Yvonne Catterfeld; Kamrad; Samu Haber
- Winner: Jennifer Lynn
- Winning coach: Samu Haber
- Runner-up: Jenny Hohlbauch

Release
- Original network: ProSieben; Sat.1
- Original release: 26 September – 6 December 2024

Season chronology
- ← Previous; Season 13 Next → Season 15

The fourteenth season of the talent show The Voice of Germany premiered on 26 September 2024. The show is broadcast by two local TV stations, ProSieben and Sat.1, during the Blind Auditions and the Battles.

Samu Haber and Yvonne Catterfeld returned as coaches after a three-season absence, as well as Mark Forster, who returned after a one-season absence. The three returning coaches were joined by Kamrad who made his debut as a coach. Thore Schölermann returned for his thirteenth season as host, with Melissa Khalaj returning for her third season as host.

Jennifer Lynn won the season, marking Samu Haber's third win as a coach (Haber's second win was during season 10 along with Rea Garvey as a duo coach), making her the oldest winner to date in the show's history. With Lynn's win, Haber became the first coach on the main version of the show to win three times.

== Panelists ==
=== Coaches ===
The Voice of Germany season 14 main coaches

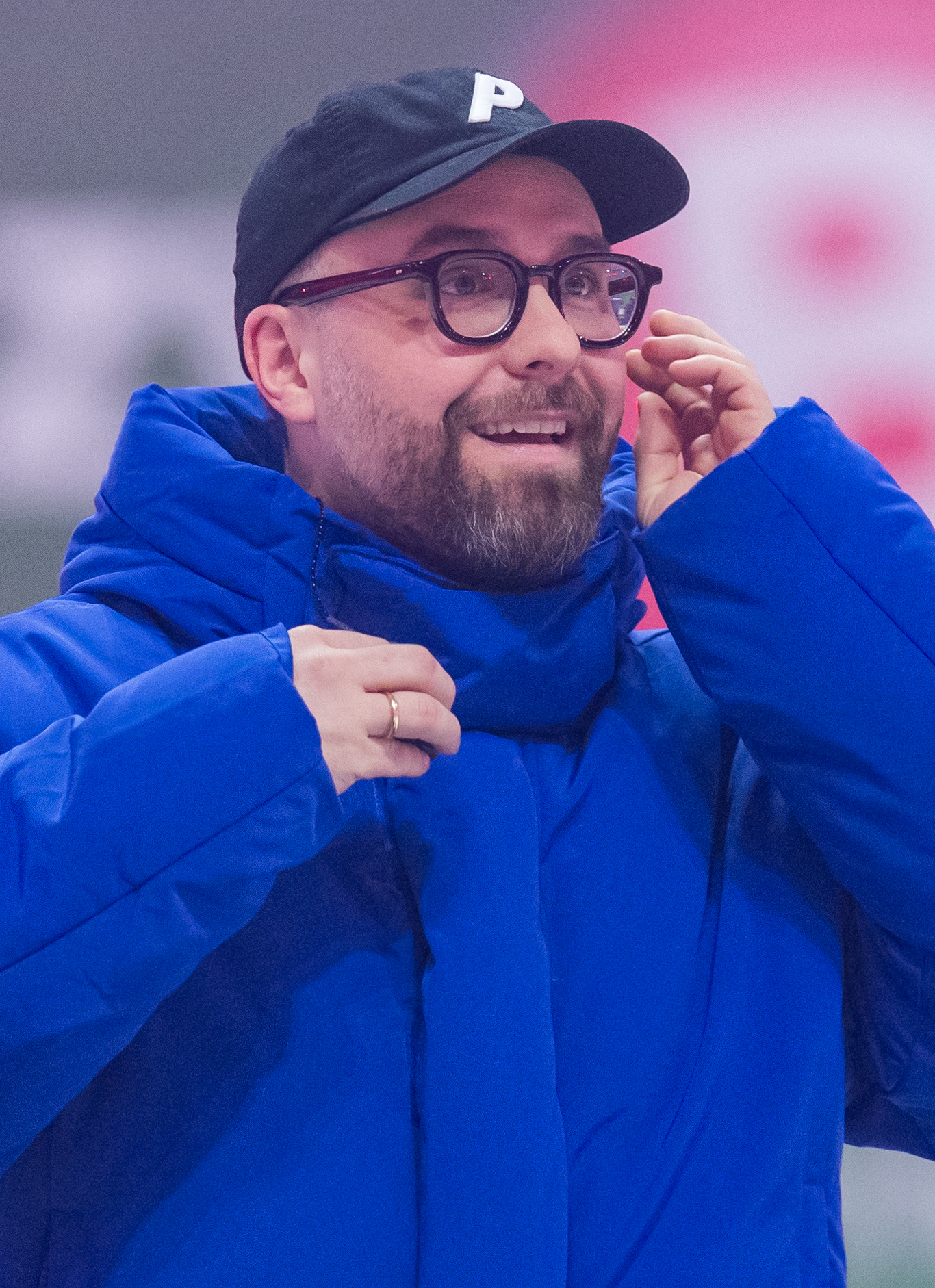
Mark Forster

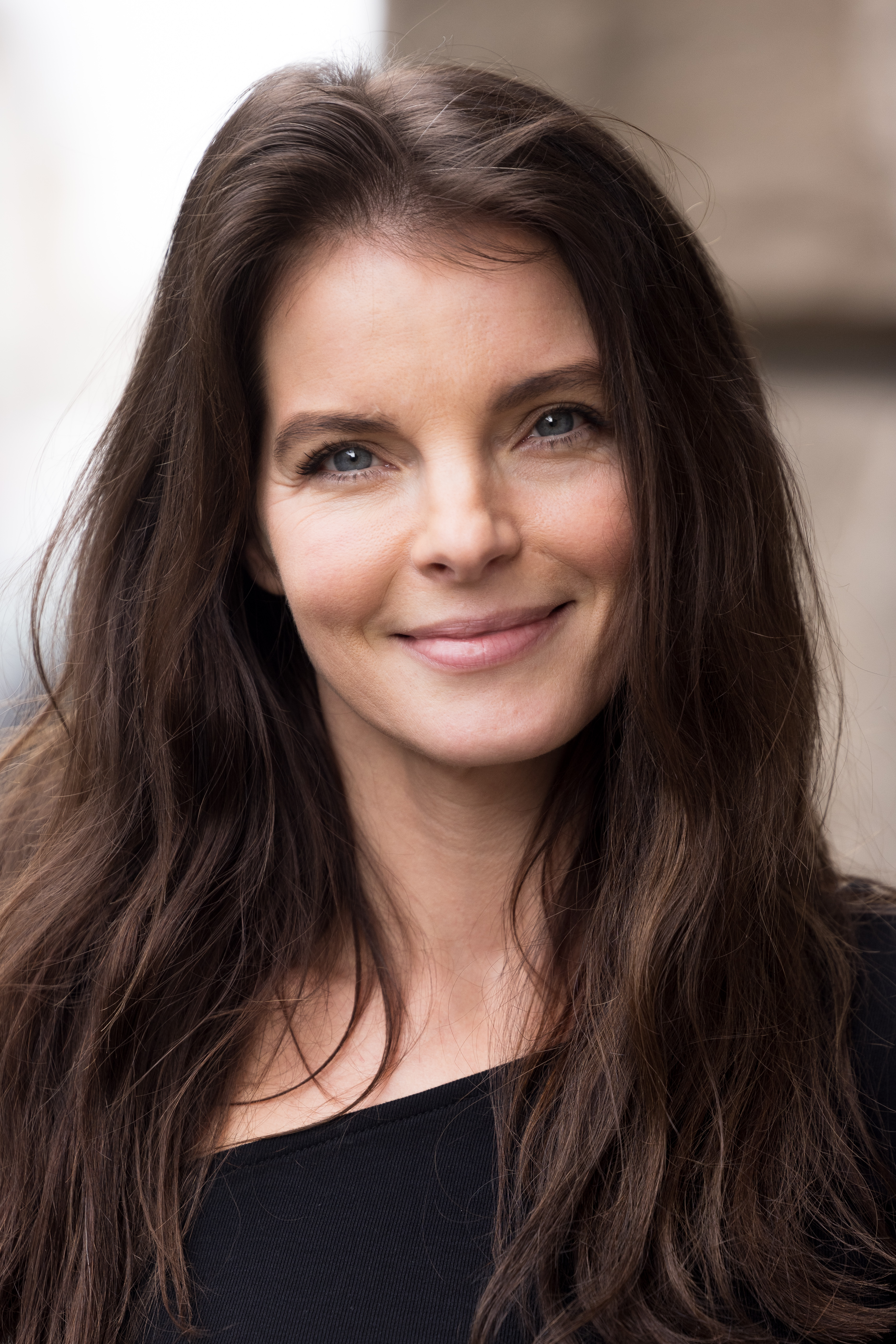
Yvonne Catterfeld

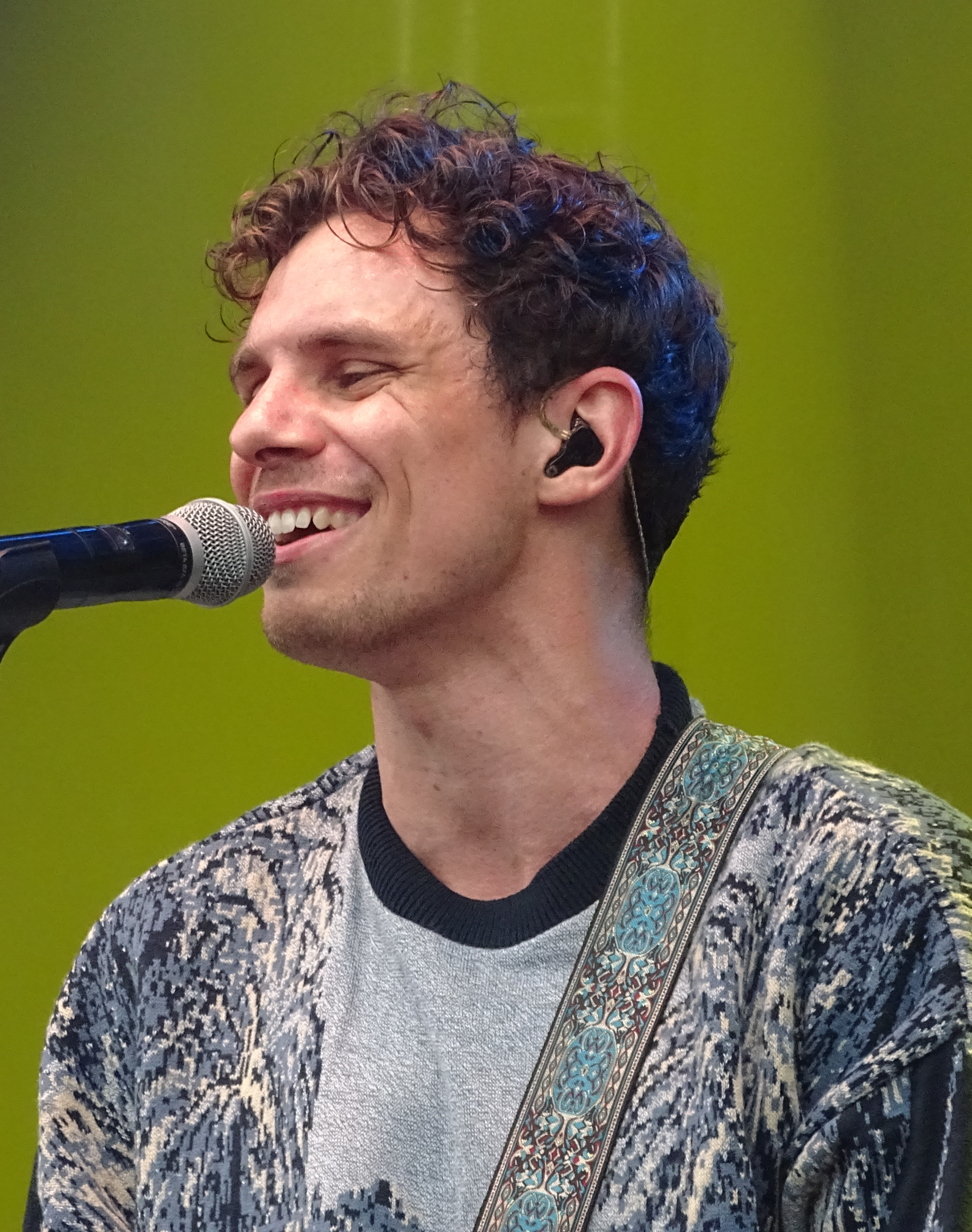
Kamrad

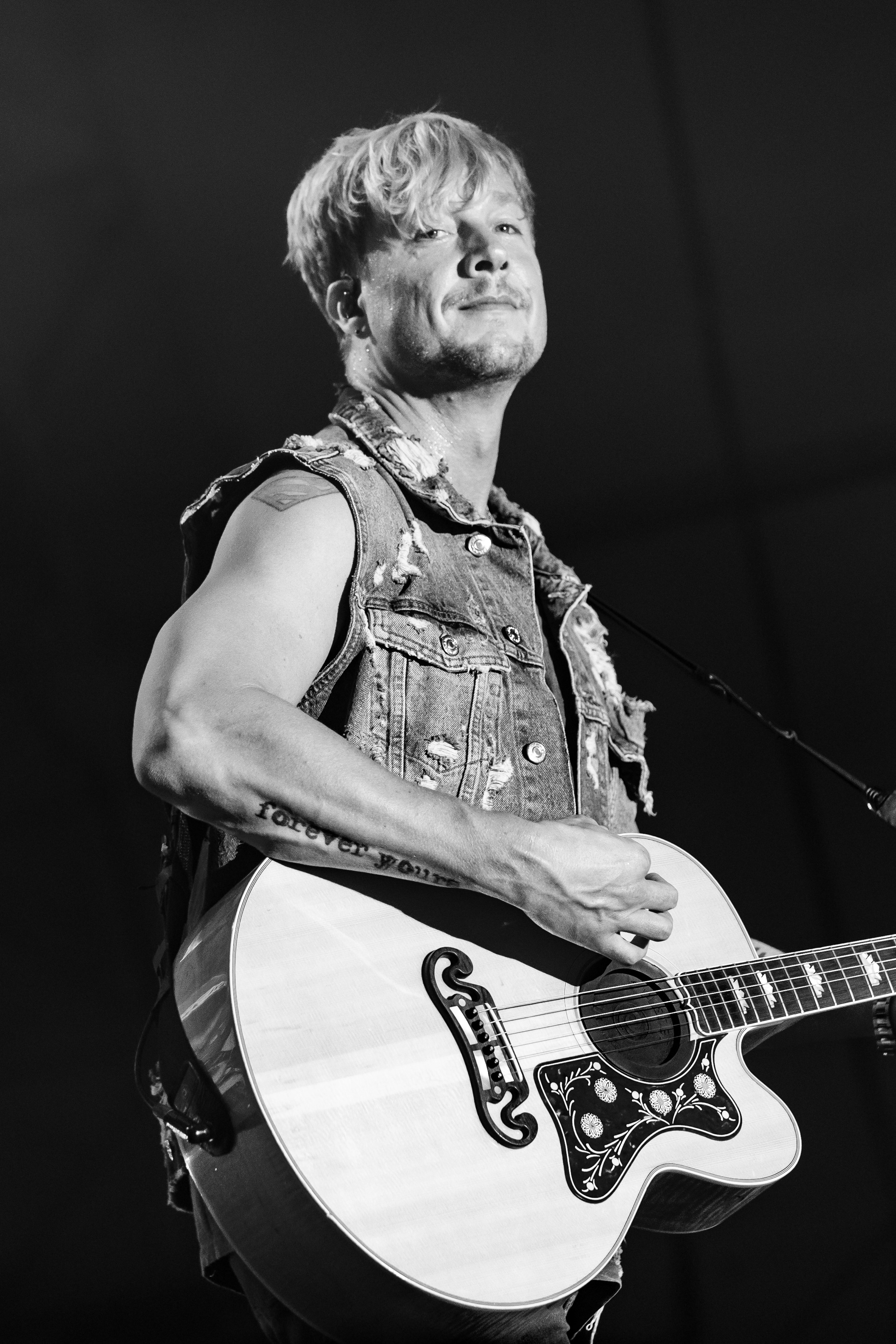
Samu Haber

In April 2024, ProSieben and Sat.1 announced that all four coaches from the previous season; Giovanni Zarrella, Bill & Tom Kaulitz, Shirin David, and Ronan Keating; would depart the panel for the upcoming fourteenth season. This marks the second season to have all coaches from the previous panel replaced, following season 13. On 18 May 2024, it was announced that previous coaches Mark Forster, Yvonne Catterfeld, and Samu Haber would return for their seventh, fifth, and sixth seasons, respectively. They were joined by Kamrad who made his debut as a coach this season.

=== Hosts ===
Both Thore Schölermann and Melissa Khalaj returned as hosts from last season.

== Teams ==
Teams color key
Winner	Eliminated in the Live shows
Runner-up	Eliminated in the Teamfights
Third place	Eliminated in the Battle rounds
Fourth place
Fifth place
Sixth place

Coaching teams
Coaches	Top 68 Artists					
Mark Forster						
Mark Forster	Jenny Hohlbauch	Kathrin German	Anna Lena Lubes	Elias Zobeley	Gina Bulach	Kai-Olaf Stehrenberg
Mark Forster	Marco Schumertl	Steffani Seven	Tim Schaefer	Cecile Centeno	Jacqueline Haider	Lukas Wohlaib
Mark Forster	Marius Müller	Marlene Bellissimo	Pana Petersdorff	Sarah Knöbl	Shalu Chisenga	
Yvonne Catterfeld
Yvonne Catterfeld	Sebastian Zappel	Gian Carlos Navea	Gabriela Kyeremateng	Kadischa Weiß	Alina Jany	Anima Beka
Yvonne Catterfeld	Gabriel Alvarez Perez	Jason Klees	Verena de la Caridad Voigt Linares	Brendan Osbourne	Celina Lücke	Elijas Karlsson
Yvonne Catterfeld	Jan Becker	Jeanette Teloh	Karl Worner	Maurice Allen Lee		
Kamrad
Kamrad	Ingrid Arthur	Nico Klemm	Alexandra Kwast	Ares	Fabio Faganello	Gonçalo Martins Santana
Kamrad	Michele & Pasquale Tibello	Pino Severino	René Schlothauer	Anil Yildirim	Arlena	Biggi Kafer
Kamrad	Duo Deluxe	Hannes Volz	Marc Phillips	Miri Bond	Sascha Steitz	
Samu Haber
Samu Haber	Jennifer Lynn	Emily König	Iman Rashay	Loulia Esteves	Chris Chalmer	Corinna Feil
Samu Haber	Petter Bjällö	Scorpion	Toni Lautenschlager	Anastasia Trautwein	Jakob Trcka	Katrin Sperling
Samu Haber	Kaya Wiemers	Niklas Gajzler	Pascal Bucherer-Klingler	Raphael Merlin	Selina Hartel	Yukita

== Blind Auditions ==
The Blind Auditions began broadcasting on 26 September 2024, being broadcast every Thursday on ProSieben and every Friday on Sat.1. This season, the blocks, which were introduced last season, returned. Each coach is allowed to block another coach thrice. Only one block is allowed per audition; once a coach already used their block, the other coaches are not allowed to use their block. This season, each coach filled their teams with 18 artists. However, at the end of the blind auditions, only Samu Haber completed his team.

At the beginning on the blind auditions, the coaches performed "As It Was" to kick off the new season.

Blind auditions color key
✔	Coach hit his/her "I WANT YOU" button
	Artist defaulted to this coach's team
	Artist elected to join this coach's team
	Artist was eliminated with no coach pressing their button
	Artist received an 'All Turn'.
✘	Coach pressed "I WANT YOU" button, but was blocked by another coach from getting the artist
	Blocked by Mark; Blocked by Yvonne; Blocked by Kamrad; Blocked by Samu

Blind auditions results
Episode	Order	Artist	Age	Song	Coach's and artist's choices			
Episode	Order	Artist	Age	Song	Mark	Yvonne	Kamrad	Samu
Episode 1 (September 26)	1	Verena de la Caridad Voigt Linares	17	"Train Wreck"	✔	✔	✔	✔
Episode 1 (September 26)	2	Anil Yildirim	25	"Ich Wünschte, Du Wärst Verloren"	✘ ^{1}	✔	✔	✔
Episode 1 (September 26)	3	Anna Kneer	28	"Texas Hold 'Em"	–	–	–	–
Episode 1 (September 26)	4	Marlene Bellissimo	29	"Dream A Little Dream"	✔	–	✔	–
Episode 1 (September 26)	5	Biggi Käfer	53	"Whole Lotta Love"	–	–	✔	–
Episode 1 (September 26)	6	Benjamin and Jamal	24 & 29	"Mr. Brightside"	–	–	–	–
Episode 1 (September 26)	7	Anna Lena Lubes	31	"Part of Your World"	✔	✔	✔	✔
Episode 1 (September 26)	8	Marta Syrenskiy	38	"Let Me Blow Ya Mind"	–	–	–	–
Episode 1 (September 26)	9	Sebastian Zappel	25	"Pointless"	✔	✔	✔	✔
Episode 1 (September 26)	10	Kaya Wiemers	21	"Ich liebe das Leben"	✔	–	–	✔
Episode 1 (September 26)	11	Maurice Allen Lee	71	"Loco in Acapulco"	✔	✔	✔	✘
Episode 2 (September 27)	1	Iman Rashay	23	"Are You Gonna Be My Girl"	✔	✔	✔	✔
Episode 2 (September 27)	2	René Schlothauer	45	"Broken Wings"	✔	–	✔	–
Episode 2 (September 27)	3	Maren & Christian Janowsky	27 & 61	"Butterfly Fly Away"	–	–	–	–
Episode 2 (September 27)	4	Cecile Centeno	39	"It's All Coming Back To Me"	✔	–	✔	–
Episode 2 (September 27)	5	Gabriela Kyeremateng	25	"Shackles (Praise You)"	✔	✔	✔	✔
Episode 2 (September 27)	6	Michael Wilhelm	36	"Drift Away"	–	–	–	–
Episode 2 (September 27)	7	Jenny Hohlbauch	20	"Immer Wieder Geht Die Sonne Auf"	✔	–	✔	–
Episode 2 (September 27)	8	Gabriel Alvarez Perez	23	"Te Vi Venir"	–	✔	✔	–
Episode 2 (September 27)	9	Kai-Olaf Stehrenberg	44	"Eloise"	✔	–	–	–
Episode 2 (September 27)	10	Lisandra Estevez Gonzalez	25	"Lieb Mich"	–	–	–	–
Episode 2 (September 27)	11	Michele & Pasquale Tibello	31	"Rule The World"	✔	✔	✔	✔
Episode 3 (October 3)	1	Elijas Karlsson	18	"In The Stars"	✔	✔	✘	✔
Episode 3 (October 3)	2	Lea Wilhelm		"Eisberg"	–	–	–	–
Episode 3 (October 3)	3	Pino Severino	32	"Beautiful Things"	✔	✔	✔	–
Episode 3 (October 3)	4	Kathrin German ^{2}	16	"Rise Up"	✔	✔ ^{3}	✔	✔
Episode 3 (October 3)	5	Yukita	24	"Haus am See"	–	–	✔	✔
Episode 3 (October 3)	6	Thomas Meyenberg	53	"Merci Chérie"	–	–	–	–
Episode 3 (October 3)	7	Selina Hartel	19	"Somewhere Only We Know"	–	–	–	✔
Episode 3 (October 3)	8	Chris Chalmer	31	"Boomerang"	✔	–	–	✔
Episode 3 (October 3)	9	Gian Carlos Navea	24	"Watermelon Sugar"	✔	✔	✔	✔
Episode 3 (October 3)	10	Esra Richter	36	"Alles Leuchtet"	–	–	–	–
Episode 3 (October 3)	11	Alexandra Kwast	30	"No Time To Die"	✔	✔	✔	✔
Episode 4 (October 4)	1	Marius Müller	41	"Verdammt, ich lieb' dich"	✔	–	✔	✔
Episode 4 (October 4)	2	Jennifer Lynn	46	"Dreams"	✔	✔	✔	✔
Episode 4 (October 4)	3	Marko Parlow	49	"Ein Stück Vom Himmel"	–	–	–	–
Episode 4 (October 4)	4	Jason Klees^{4}	19	"I'm just Ken"	–	✔	–	–
Episode 4 (October 4)	5	Kadischa Weiß	19	"One Night Only"	–	✔	✔	–
Episode 4 (October 4)	6	Pascal Bucherer-Klingler	25	"If I Ain't Got You"	–	✘	–	✔
Episode 4 (October 4)	7	Leonie Herbertz	23	"If I Ain't Got You"	–	–	–	–
Episode 4 (October 4)	8	Fabio Faganello	28	"Holiday"	–	✔	✔	–
Episode 4 (October 4)	9	The New Asuka	32	"My Universe"	–	–	–	–
Episode 4 (October 4)	10	Corinna Feil	25	"Oscar Winning Tears"	✔	✘	✔	✔
Episode 4 (October 4)	11	Sarah Knöbl	23	"Wie A Kind"	✔	–	–	–
Episode 4 (October 4)	12	Ingrid Arthur	57	"Still Haven't Found What I'm Looking For"	✔	✘	✔	✔
Episode 5 (October 9)	1	Marco Schumertl	27	"Rebel Yell"	✔	✘	✔	✔
Episode 5 (October 9)	2	Alina Jany	18	"Lovely"	✘	✔	–	–
Episode 5 (October 9)	3	Nicholas Hofbauer	32	"Go the Distance"	–	–	–	–
Episode 5 (October 9)	4	Tim Schaefer	25	"Über den Wolken"	✔	–	–	–
Episode 5 (October 9)	5	Toni Lautenschlager	29	"Junge"	✔	–	✔	✔
Episode 5 (October 9)	6	Barbara Heß	54	"There You'll Be"	–	–	–	–
Episode 5 (October 9)	7	Brendan Osborne	34	"Tik Tok"	✔	✔	–	–
Episode 5 (October 9)	8	Nico Klemm	22	"Homicide"	✔	✔	✔	✔
Episode 5 (October 9)	9	Jessica Wiest	41	"Ich lebe"	–	–	–	–
Episode 5 (October 9)	10	Duo Deluxe	55/60	"Up Where We Belong"	–	–	✔	–
Episode 5 (October 9)	11	Karl Worner	24	"Egoist"	✔	✔	–	–
Episode 5 (October 9)	12	Gina Bulach	26	"Cry Me a River"	✔	✔	✘	✔
Episode 6 (October 11)	1	Petter Bjällö	49	"Die Musik Der Nacht"	✔	–	✔	✔
Episode 6 (October 11)	2	Bärbel Weinert-Maurer	41	"Open Your Eyes"	–	–	–	–
Episode 6 (October 11)	3	Scorpion	24	"Jaded"	✔	✔	–	✔
Episode 6 (October 11)	4	Celina Lücke	20	"She Used To Be Mine"	–	✔	–	–
Episode 6 (October 11)	5	Sascha Steitz	29	"Glücklich"	–	–	✔	✔
Episode 6 (October 11)	6	Emily König	19	"Flowers"	✔	✘	✔	✔
Episode 6 (October 11)	7	Maximilian Henning	22	"Holes"	–	–	–	–
Episode 6 (October 11)	8	Anima Beka	22	"Masterpiece"	✔	✔	–	–
Episode 6 (October 11)	9	Jacqueline Haider	22	"Nothing's Gonna Change My Love for You"	✔	✔	✔	✔
Episode 6 (October 11)	10	Marc Phillips	26	"California Dreamin'"	✔	✔	✔	✔
Episode 7 (October 17)	1	Elias Zobeley	20	"Rocket Man"	✔	–	–	✘
Episode 7 (October 17)	2	Loulia Esteves	25	"The Lady Is a Tramp"	✔	✔	✔	✔
Episode 7 (October 17)	3	Mo'Voce	35-37	"Bridge over Troubled Water"	–	–	–	–
Episode 7 (October 17)	4	Hannes Volz	27	"Stick Season"	–	✔	✔	✔
Episode 7 (October 17)	5	Miri Bond	38	"You're the One That I Want"	–	–	✔	–
Episode 7 (October 17)	6	Pana Petterdoff	62	"Hinter'm Horizont geht's weiter"	✔	–	✔	–
Episode 7 (October 17)	7	Anna Behrendt	28	"Null auf 100"	–	–	–	–
Episode 7 (October 17)	8	Ares	19	"When the Party's Over"	✔	✔	✔	✔
Episode 7 (October 17)	9	Lukas Wohlaib	26	"Hey Laura"	✔	–	✔	–
Episode 7 (October 17)	10	Arlena	36	"Make You Feel My Love"	✔	–	✔	–
Episode 7 (October 17)	11	Olivia Brunen	32	"Keiner ist wie du	–	–	–	–
Episode 7 (October 17)	12	Jakob Trcka	19	"Be Alright	–	✔	–	✔
Episode 8 (October 18)	1	Steffani Seven	47	"Ain't Nobody"	✔	✔	✔	–
Episode 8 (October 18)	2	Madeleine Bradley	19	"Million Reasons"	–	–	–	–
Episode 8 (October 18)	3	Anastasia Trautwein	28	"Ich hass dich"	–	–	–	✔
Episode 8 (October 18)	4	Goncalo Martins Santana	25	"For Once in My Life"	–	✘	✔	–
Episode 8 (October 18)	5	Katrin Sperling	38	"(You Make Me Feel Like) A Natural Woman"	–	–	–	✔
Episode 8 (October 18)	6	Isa Roddy	24	"Barracuda "	–	–	–	–
Episode 8 (October 18)	7	Niklas Gajzler	21	"Dancing on My Own"	–	✔	–	✔
Episode 8 (October 18)	8	Sherin Gencer	19	"Love"	–	–	–	–
Episode 8 (October 18)	9	Jeanette Teloh	31	"Soulmate"	–	✔	✔	–
Episode 8 (October 18)	10	Shalu Chisenga	34	"Here Comes the Hotstepper"	✔	✔	–	–
Episode 8 (October 18)	11	Yeuseff	33	"Gratitude"	–	–	–	–
Episode 8 (October 18)	12	Jan Becker	25	"Lonely"	–	✔	–	–
Episode 8 (October 18)	13	Raphael Merlin	30	"Best of You"	✔	✔	✔	✔

- ^1 Kamrad successfully pressed the block button on Mark, but Samu had already blocked Mark so the block didn't count.
- ^2 Kathrin German previously particiapated in the eighth season of The Voice Kids Germany where she was coached by Sasha Schmitz and was eliminated in the Battles
- ^3 Kamrad tried to block Yvonne, but was not possible, since she had already turned.
- ^4 Jason Klees previously participated in the eighth season of The Voice Kids Germany, where he was coached by Sasha Schmitz and was eliminated in the Sing-Offs.

== Battles ==
The Battles began broadcasting on 24 October 2024, being broadcast every Thursday on ProSieben and every Friday on Sat.1. Artists are divided into pairs (Teams Mark and Kamrad featured one trio each and Team Samu featured two trios due to their teams having 17 and 18 artists, respectively) to perform a song together. Each coach could select any number of candidates of each battle into the next phase, with each battle having one, multiple, or no winner. Each coach has nine artists on their team after the battles.

Battle rounds color key
Artist won the Battle and advanced to the Teamfights
Artist lost the Battle and was eliminated

Episode	Coach	Order	Winner(s)	Song	Loser(s)
Episode 9 (October 24)	Yvonne	1	Verena de la Caridad Voigt Linares	"Lose Control"	N/A
Episode 9 (October 24)	Yvonne	1	Gabriela Kyeremateng	"Lose Control"	N/A
Episode 9 (October 24)	Mark	2	Marco Schumertl	"1000 Und 1 Nacht"	Marius Müller
Episode 9 (October 24)	Samu	3	Jennifer Lynn	"Crying in the Rain"	N/A
Episode 9 (October 24)	Samu	3	Petter Bjällö	"Crying in the Rain"	N/A
Episode 9 (October 24)	Kamrad	4	Nico Klemm	"Numb/Encore"	N/A
Episode 9 (October 24)	Kamrad	4	Fabio Faganello	"Numb/Encore"	N/A
Episode 9 (October 24)	Yvonne	5	N/A	"Mambo"	Karl Worner
Episode 9 (October 24)	Yvonne	5	N/A	"Mambo"	Jan Becker
Episode 9 (October 24)	Mark	6	Kathrin German	"Stay"	Cecile Centeno
Episode 9 (October 24)	Mark	6	Anna Lena Lubes	"Stay"	Cecile Centeno
Episode 9 (October 24)	Kamrad	7	Michele & Pasquale Tibello	"Sarà perché ti amo"	Duo Deluxe
Episode 9 (October 24)	Samu	8	Iman Rashay	"Psychosocial"	Raphael Merlin
Episode 9 (October 24)	Samu	8	Chris Chalmer	"Psychosocial"	Raphael Merlin
Episode 10 (October 25)	Kamrad	1	René Schlothauer	"You're The Voice"	Biggi Kafer
Episode 10 (October 25)	Mark	2	Kai-Olaf Stehrenberg	"...Baby One More Time"	N/A
Episode 10 (October 25)	Mark	2	Steffani Seven	"...Baby One More Time"	N/A
Episode 10 (October 25)	Yvonne	3	Alina Jany	"True Colors"	Jeanette Teloh
Episode 10 (October 25)	Samu	4	N/A	"Belong Together"	Niklas Gajzler
Episode 10 (October 25)	Samu	4	N/A	"Belong Together"	Jakob Trcka
Episode 10 (October 25)	Kamrad	5	Alexandra Kwast	"Sweet Dreams (Are Made of This)"	Miri Bond
Episode 10 (October 25)	Mark	6	N/A	"Hey"	Pana Petterdoff
Episode 10 (October 25)	Mark	6	N/A	"Hey"	Sarah Knöbl
Episode 10 (October 25)	Samu	7	Loulia Esteves	"Dark Horse"	N/A
Episode 10 (October 25)	Samu	7	Corinna Feil	"Dark Horse"	N/A
Episode 10 (October 25)	Yvonne	8	Gabriel Alvarez Perez	"I Won't Give Up"	N/A
Episode 10 (October 25)	Yvonne	8	Gian Carlos Navea	"I Won't Give Up"	N/A
Episode 11 (October 31)	Samu	1	N/A	"Forgive Me Friend"	Pascal Bucherer-Klingler
Episode 11 (October 31)	Samu	1	N/A	"Forgive Me Friend"	Katrin Sperling
Episode 11 (October 31)	Kamrad	2	Ares	"Unholy"	N/A
Episode 11 (October 31)	Kamrad	2	Pino Severino	"Unholy"	N/A
Episode 11 (October 31)	Mark	3	Elias Zobeley	"Wild World"	Jacqueline Haider
Episode 11 (October 31)	Yvonne	4	N/A	"Don't Let Me Be Misunderstood"	Celina Lücke
Episode 11 (October 31)	Yvonne	4	N/A	"Don't Let Me Be Misunderstood"	Brendan Osborne
Episode 11 (October 31)	Samu	5	Scorpion	"We Can't Be Friends (Wait for Your Love)"	N/A
Episode 11 (October 31)	Samu	5	Emily König	"We Can't Be Friends (Wait for Your Love)"	N/A
Episode 11 (October 31)	Kamrad	6	N/A	"I Will Wait"	Marc Phillips
Episode 11 (October 31)	Kamrad	6	N/A	"I Will Wait"	Hannes Volz
Episode 11 (October 31)	Mark	7	Gina Bulach	"My Love Is Your Love"	Shalu Chisenga
Episode 11 (October 31)	Yvonne	8	Jason Klees	"Give Me One Reason"	N/A
Episode 11 (October 31)	Yvonne	8	Anima Beka	"Give Me One Reason"	N/A
Episode 12 (November 1)	Yvonne	1	Kadischa Weiß	"Valerie"	Maurice Allen Lee
Episode 12 (November 1)	Kamrad	2	N/A	"Ausmacht"	Anil Yildirim
Episode 12 (November 1)	Kamrad	2	N/A	"Ausmacht"	Sascha Steitz
Episode 12 (November 1)	Mark^{5}	3	N/A	"Where the Wild Roses Grow"	Marlene Bellissimo
Episode 12 (November 1)	Mark^{5}	3	N/A	"Where the Wild Roses Grow"	Lukas Wohlaib
Episode 12 (November 1)	Samu	4	N/A	"Big Big World"	Kaya Wiemers
Episode 12 (November 1)	Samu	4	N/A	"Big Big World"	Selina Hartel
Episode 12 (November 1)	Yvonne	5	Sebastian Zappel	"Power Over Me"	Elijas Karlsson
Episode 12 (November 1)	Samu	6	Toni Lautenschlager	"Geile Zeit"	Yukita
Episode 12 (November 1)	Samu	6	Toni Lautenschlager	"Geile Zeit"	Anastasia Trautwein
Episode 12 (November 1)	Mark^{5}	7	Jenny Hohlbauch	"Grüne Augen lügen nicht"	N/A
Episode 12 (November 1)	Mark^{5}	7	Tim Schaefer	"Grüne Augen lügen nicht"	N/A
Episode 12 (November 1)	Kamrad	8	Ingrid Arthur	"With a Little Help from My Friends"	Arlena
Episode 12 (November 1)	Kamrad	8	Goncalo Martins Santana	"With a Little Help from My Friends"	Arlena

- ^5 Mark Forster had already advanced 7 artists to the next round in his previous battles, leaving his team with only two spots left in the Teamfights. However, he still had two battles left. As a result, he decided to postpone his decision at the end of his second-last battle with Marlene Bellissimo and Lukas Wohlaib, because he thought it would be unfair to decide until after his final battle pairing (Jenny Hohlbauch and Tim Schaefer) performed. After his last battle, Marlene Bellissimo and Lukas Wohlaib were called back on stage. Forster picked two out of the four artists (Bellissimo, Wohlaib, Hohlbauch and Schaefer) to advance to the Teamfights.

== Teamfights ==
The teamfights were recorded from 27 and 28 July 2024. It began broadcasting only by Sat.1 on Friday nights starting 8 November 2024. In this stage of the competition, 12 artists appeared in each of three rounds. First, one artist per team sang and took a seat on one of four chairs called "hotseat". Once these seats were occupied, the next artist challenged one of the seated artists, and after the artists' performance, the studio audience decided who was allowed to take the seat. This process was repeated until all 12 had been performing. At the end of each episode, the 4 artists seated at the end of each episode, from any team, advanced to the semi-final. A coach had the possibility to lose all of their artists, or bring all of their artists to the semi-finals. However, every coach was represented in the semi-finals and every coach did not bring their entire team to the semi-finals after this round.

Teamfights color key
Artist was seated and advanced to the live shows
Artist was seated but was swapped and eliminated
Artist was not seated and was eliminated

Episode	Coach	Order	Artist	Song	Challenged Artist	Hotseat
Episode 13 (November 8)	Yvonne	1	Anima Beka	"If I Were a Boy"	—N/a	Put in Hot-seat 1
Episode 13 (November 8)	Kamrad	2	René Schlothauer	"Roxanne"	—N/a	Put in Hot-seat 2
Episode 13 (November 8)	Mark	3	Gina Bulach	"I See Red"	—N/a	Put in Hot-seat 3
Episode 13 (November 8)	Samu	4	Toni Lautenschlager	"Major Tom, Part II"	—N/a	Put in Hot-seat 4
Episode 13 (November 8)	Yvonne	5	Alina Jany	"Wings""	Toni Lautenschlager	Put in Hot-seat 4
Episode 13 (November 8)	Kamrad	6	Pino Severino	"Incomplete"	Gina Bulach	Eliminated
Episode 13 (November 8)	Mark	7	Jenny Hohlbauch	"Flugzeuge im Bauch"	Alina Jany	Put in Hot-seat 4
Episode 13 (November 8)	Samu	8	Jennifer Lynn	"Angel"	René Schlothauer	Put in Hot-seat 2
Episode 13 (November 8)	Yvonne	9	Kadischa Weiß	"Because You Loved Me"	Gina Bulach	Put in Hot-seat 3
Episode 13 (November 8)	Kamrad	10	Ingrid Arthur	"And I Am Telling You I'm Not Going"	Anima Beka	Put in Hot-seat 1
Episode 13 (November 8)	Mark	11	Anna Lena Lubes	"My Heart Will Go On"	Kadischa Weiß	Eliminated
Episode 13 (November 8)	Samu	12	Chris Chalmer	"Blue (Da Ba Dee)"	Kadischa Weiß	Eliminated
Episode 14 (November 15)	Yvonne	1	Gabriel Alvarez Perez	"You Are the Reason"	—N/a	Put in Hot-seat 1
Episode 14 (November 15)	Samu	2	Petter Bjällö	"The NeverEnding Story"	—N/a	Put in Hot-seat 2
Episode 14 (November 15)	Kamrad	3	Michele & Pasquale Tibello	"Ti amo"	—N/a	Put in Hot-seat 3
Episode 14 (November 15)	Mark	4	Kai-Olaf Stehrenberg	"She's So High"	—N/a	Put in Hot-seat 4
Episode 14 (November 15)	Yvonne	5	Verena de la Caridad Voigt Linares	"I Put a Spell on You"	Petter Bjällö	Put in Hot-seat 2
Episode 14 (November 15)	Samu	6	Emily König	"You Say"	Gabriel Alvarez Perez	Put in Hot-seat 1
Episode 14 (November 15)	Kamrad	7	Nico Klemm	"Can't Hold Us"	Kai-Olaf Stehrenberg	Put in Hot-seat 4
Episode 14 (November 15)	Mark	8	Elias Zobeley	"Father and Son"	Michele & Pasquale Tibello	Put in Hot-seat 3
Episode 14 (November 15)	Yvonne	9	Gian Carlos Navea	"Way Down We Go"	Elias Zobeley	Put in Hot-seat 3
Episode 14 (November 15)	Samu	10	Scorpion	"Beautiful"	Verena de la Caridad Voigt Linares	Eliminated
Episode 14 (November 15)	Kamrad	11	Fabio Faganello	"So What"	Gian Carlos Navea	Eliminated
Episode 14 (November 15)	Mark	12	Kathrin German	"I Have Nothing"	Verena de la Caridad Voigt Linares	Put in Hot-seat 2
Episode 15 (November 22)	Samu	1	Loulia Esteves	"La Vie en rose"	—N/a	Put in Hot-seat 1
Episode 15 (November 22)	Mark	2	Marco Schumertl	"Kryptonite"	—N/a	Put in Hot-seat 2
Episode 15 (November 22)	Kamrad	3	Ares	"Eastside"	—N/a	Put in Hot-seat 3
Episode 15 (November 22)	Yvonne	4	Sebastian Zappel	"To Love Someone"	—N/a	Put in Hot-seat 4
Episode 15 (November 22)	Samu	5	Corinna Feil	"Nobody's Perfect"	Ares	Put in Hot-seat 3
Episode 15 (November 22)	Mark	6	Tim Schaefer	"Küssen kann man nicht alleine"	Corinna Feil	Eliminated
Episode 15 (November 22)	Kamrad	7	Alexandra Kwast	"Elastic Heart"	Marco Schumertl	Eliminated
Episode 15 (November 22)	Yvonne	8	Jason Klees	"Golden"	Corinna Feil	Eliminated
Episode 15 (November 22)	Samu	9	Iman Rashay	"The Code"	Marco Schumertl	Put in Hot-seat 2
Episode 15 (November 22)	Mark	10	Steffani Seven	"The Best"	Corinna Feil	Put in Hot-seat 3
Episode 15 (November 22)	Kamrad	11	Gonçalo Martins Santana	"You Give Me Something"	Loulia Esteves	Eliminated
Episode 15 (November 22)	Yvonne	12	Gabriela Kyeremateng	"I Look to You"	Steffani Seven	Put in Hot-seat 3

Detailed chairs' changes
Episode	Order	Hotseat 1	Hotseat 2	Hotseat 3	Hotseat 4
Episode 13	4	Anima Beka	René Schlothauer	Gina Bulach	Toni Lautenschlager
Episode 13	5	Anima Beka	René Schlothauer	Gina Bulach	Alina Jany
Episode 13	6	Anima Beka	René Schlothauer	Gina Bulach	Alina Jany
Episode 13	7	Anima Beka	René Schlothauer	Gina Bulach	Jenny Hohlbauch
Episode 13	8	Anima Beka	Jennifer Lynn	Gina Bulach	Jenny Hohlbauch
Episode 13	9	Anima Beka	Jennifer Lynn	Kadischa Weiß	Jenny Hohlbauch
Episode 13	10	Ingrid Arthur	Jennifer Lynn	Kadischa Weiß	Jenny Hohlbauch
Episode 13	11	Ingrid Arthur	Jennifer Lynn	Kadischa Weiß	Jenny Hohlbauch
Episode 13	12	Ingrid Arthur	Jennifer Lynn	Kadischa Weiß	Jenny Hohlbauch
Episode 14	4	Gabriel Alvarez Perez	Petter Bjällö	Michele & Pasquale Tibello	Kai-Olaf Stehrenberg
Episode 14	5	Gabriel Alvarez Perez	Verena de la Caridad Voigt Linares	Michele & Pasquale Tibello	Kai-Olaf Stehrenberg
Episode 14	6	Emily König	Verena de la Caridad Voigt Linares	Michele & Pasquale Tibello	Kai-Olaf Stehrenberg
Episode 14	7	Emily König	Verena de la Caridad Voigt Linares	Michele & Pasquale Tibello	Nico Klemm
Episode 14	8	Emily König	Verena de la Caridad Voigt Linares	Elias Zobeley	Nico Klemm
Episode 14	9	Emily König	Verena de la Caridad Voigt Linares	Gian Carlos Navea	Nico Klemm
Episode 14	10	Emily König	Verena de la Caridad Voigt Linares	Gian Carlos Navea	Nico Klemm
Episode 14	11	Emily König	Verena de la Caridad Voigt Linares	Gian Carlos Navea	Nico Klemm
Episode 14	12	Emily König	Kathrin German	Gian Carlos Navea	Nico Klemm
Episode 15	4	Loulia Esteves	Marco Schumertl	Ares	Sebastian Zappel
Episode 15	5	Loulia Esteves	Marco Schumertl	Corinna Feil	Sebastian Zappel
Episode 15	6	Loulia Esteves	Marco Schumertl	Corinna Feil	Sebastian Zappel
Episode 15	7	Loulia Esteves	Marco Schumertl	Corinna Feil	Sebastian Zappel
Episode 15	8	Loulia Esteves	Marco Schumertl	Corinna Feil	Sebastian Zappel
Episode 15	9	Loulia Esteves	Iman Rashay	Corinna Feil	Sebastian Zappel
Episode 15	10	Loulia Esteves	Iman Rashay	Steffani Seven	Sebastian Zappel
Episode 15	11	Loulia Esteves	Iman Rashay	Steffani Seven	Sebastian Zappel
Episode 15	12	Loulia Esteves	Iman Rashay	Gabriela Kyeremateng	Sebastian Zappel

== Semi-final ==
The semi-final aired on 29 November. Six artists out of the twelve in the round progressed to the final, regardless of team. All decisions are made by television viewers via televoting. Due to the teamfights round prior to the semi-finals, this season is the second to feature an uneven amount of artists from each team entering the semi-finals: Team Mark and Team Kamrad has two artists each, while Team Yvonne and Team Samu has four artists each.

Due to votes being solely for the artist, it was not guaranteed that each coach would be represented in the finale. However, all four coaches successfully brought their team to the finale. Mark Forster, with the advancements of Kathrin German and Jenny Hohlbauch, became the fourth coach in the history of the show; after Samu Haber, Andreas Bourani, and Ronan Keating; to bring two artists to the final. This season marks the first time in the history of the show that two coaches (Forster and Haber) brought two artists to the final.

To start off the semi-final, the coaches and semi-finalists performed "Beggin'". During the show, last season's winner, Malou Lovis Kreyelkamp, performed her song "Twenty-Five".

Semi-final color key
Artist was advanced to the finale from the public's vote
Artist was eliminated

Semi-final results
Order	Coach	Artist	Song	Result
1	Samu	Jennifer Lynn	"Easy on Me"	Advanced
2	Yvonne	Gian Carlos Navea	"Leave a Light On"	Eliminated
3	Mark	Kathrin German	"Against All Odds (Take a Look at Me Now)"	Advanced
4	Kamrad	Nico Klemm	"Rap God" / "Without Me"	Eliminated
5	Yvonne	Kadischa Weiß	"Listen"	Eliminated
6	Samu	Iman Rashay	"The Emptiness Machine"	Eliminated
7	Kamrad	Ingrid Arthur	"Purple Rain"	Advanced
8	Samu	Loulia Esteves	"Mercy"	Eliminated
9	Yvonne	Sebastian Zappel	"Control"	Advanced
10	Yvonne	Gabriela Kyeremateng	"You Don't Own Me"	Eliminated
11	Mark	Jenny Hohlbauch	"Wenn Du Mich Lasst"	Advanced
12	Samu	Emily König	"Piece by Piece"	Advanced

== Finale ==
The finale will air on 6 December. For the first time in the history of the show, this season featured six finalists who competed for the public's vote to be declared the winner of the season. Each finalist sings an original song, a duet with their coach, and a duet with a guest singer (Ray Dalton or Calum Scott).

David Garrett performed with the finalists at the start of the show.

At the end of the show, Jennifer Lynn won the season, marking Samu Haber's third win as a coach. With Lynn's win, Haber became the first coach on the main version of the show to win three times.

Coach	Artist	Order	Original Song	Order	Duet Song (with coach)	Order	Duet Song (with special guest)	Voting	Result
Kamrad	Ingrid Arthur	1	"I Got More"	10	"One"	6	"Thee Unknown" (with Ray Dalton)	8,17%	Sixth place
Mark Forster	Kathrin German	2	"Another Forever"	8	"Du trägst keine Liebe in dir"	6	"Thee Unknown" (with Ray Dalton)	14,06%	Fifth place
Samu Haber	Jennifer Lynn	11	"Light The Sky"	3	"Another Love"	6	"Thee Unknown" (with Ray Dalton)	29,49%	Winner
Samu Haber	Emily König	9	"Last Girl Standing"	3	"Another Love"	12	"Roots" (with Calum Scott)	14,53%	Fourth place
Yvonne Catterfeld	Sebastian Zappel	7	"Pretty Things"	4	"FourFiveSeconds"	12	"Roots" (with Calum Scott)	14,98%	Third place
Mark Forster	Jenny Hohlbauch	5	"Vergessen mein Herz zu brechen"	8	"Du trägst keine Liebe in dir"	12	"Roots" (with Calum Scott)	18,77%	Runner-up

== Elimination Chart ==
Coaches color key

- Artist from Team Mark
- Artist from Team Yvonne
- Artist from Team Kamrad
- Artist from Team Samu

Results color key

- Winner
- Runner-up
- Third place
- Fourth place
- Fifth place
- Sixth place
- Artist was saved by the public vote
- Artist was eliminated

Overall Results
Artist	Week 1 Semi-Final	Week 2 Final
Jennifer Lynn	Safe	Winner
Jenny Hohlbauch	Safe	Runner-up
Sebastian Zappel	Safe	Third place
Emily König	Safe	Fourth place
Kathrin German	Safe	Fifth place
Ingrid Arthur	Safe	Sixth place
Loulia Esteves	Eliminated	Eliminated (Semi-Final)
Nico Klemm	Eliminated	Eliminated (Semi-Final)
Gabriela Kyeremateng	Eliminated	Eliminated (Semi-Final)
Gian Carlos Navea	Eliminated	Eliminated (Semi-Final)
Iman Rashay	Eliminated	Eliminated (Semi-Final)
Kadischa Weiß	Eliminated	Eliminated (Semi-Final)
