= Jennifer Lynn =

American singer

- Born: Chicago, Illinois, U.S.
- Occupation: Singer
- Instruments: Vocals; Piano
- Years active: 2005–present
- Website: jenniferlynn.com

Jennifer Lynn is a German-based American-born singer. She is the winner of season 14 of the German talent competition The Voice of Germany, having competed on the team coached by Samu Haber.

== Personal life ==
Born in Chicago, Illinois, Lynn toured the US as a dueling pianist and singer before moving to the Netherlands in 2009 to perform for the Dutch club and piano bar Crazy Pianos. While in the Netherlands, Lynn was invited to perform for members of the Dutch Royal Family, including King Willem-Alexander, Princess Margriet, and Prince Pieter-Christiaan. In 2014, Lynn married and moved to Germany to support her husband's career and raise their children. After their separation in 2022, Lynn resumed making music.

== Career ==
In 2005, Lynn released her studio album, In a Moment.

=== The Voice of Holland ===
In 2013, Lynn auditioned for the fourth season of The Voice of Holland, singing "Fix You" by Coldplay. All four coaches on the show (Marco Borsato, Trijntje Oosterhuis, Ilse DeLange and Ali B) turned their chairs for her. Lynn chose to be a part of Team Ali B. She was eliminated in the Semi-finals. During her time on the show, two of her songs' studio version reached the Dutch Single Top 100: "Fix You" reached #29 on 4 October 2013, and "Zombie" charted at #98 on 6 December 2013. She also recorded a Christmas single along with the season's fellow top 8 contestants, "Christmas Hearts", which charted #29 on 21 October 2013.

Performances on The Voice of Holland season 4
Round	Song	Original artist	Order	Original air date	Result
Blind Audition	"Fix You"	Coldplay	6.8	4 October 2013	All four chairs turned; joined Team Ali B
Battle Round	"You're Still the One" (vs. Laurèn ter Horst)	Shania Twain	9.4	8 November 2013	Saved by coach
Live shows	"Wicked Game"	Chris Isaak	2.1	22 November 2013	Saved by coach
Live shows	"Waves"	Mr. Probz	3.1	29 November 2013	Saved by public
Live shows	"Zombie"	The Cranberries	1.3	6 December 2013	Saved by public
Semi-finals	"Set Fire To The Rain"	Adele	3.2	13 December 2013	Eliminated

Post The Voice of Holland, Lynn released her album, 6 Degrees.

In 2015, the Netherlands Red Cross commissioned her to write and perform Carry Me as a tribute to all volunteer aid workers, releasing it on International Red Cross Day.

=== The Voice of Germany ===
In 2024, Lynn auditioned for the fourteenth season of The Voice of Germany, singing "Dreams" by Fleetwood Mac. All four coaches on the show (Mark Forster, Yvonne Catterfeld, Kamrad, and Samu Haber) expressed interest in working with Lynn, leaving the decision to her as to who would be her mentor. Lynn ultimately chose to be a part of Team Samu. During her performances, Lynn played the piano, accompanying her vocals. She won the season on 6 December with 29.49% of the public vote.

Upon winning the show, Lynn sang her original song, "Light the Sky", which was then released as a single.

Performances on The Voice of Germany season 14
Round	Song	Original artist	Order	Original air date	Result
Blind Audition	"Dreams"	Fleetwood Mac	4.2	4 October 2024	All four chairs turned; joined Team Samu
Battle Round	"Crying in the Rain" (vs. Petter Bjällö)	The Everly Brothers	9.3	24 October 2024	Saved by coach
Team Fights	"Angel"	Sarah McLachlan	13.8	8 November 2024	Saved by studio audience
Semi-finals	"Easy on Me"	Adele	16.1	29 November 2024	Saved by public
Finale	"Another Love" (with Samu Haber and Emily König)	Tom Odell	17.3	6 December 2024	Winner
Finale	"Thee Unknown" (with Ray Dalton, Ingrid Arthur, and Kathrin German)	Ray Dalton	17.20	6 December 2024	Winner
Finale	"Light the Sky"	Jennifer Lynn	17.11	6 December 2024	Winner

== Discography ==
=== Albums ===
List of studio albums
Title	Details
In a Moment	Released: 22 June 2005
6 Degrees	Released: 17 October 2014

=== Singles ===
List of singles, showing year released, and the name of the album
Title	Year	Album
"Once in a While"	2005	In a Moment
"Where My Heart Is"	2005	In a Moment
"Stay"	2005	In a Moment
"Why I'm Still Here"	2005	In a Moment
"Dreams"	2005	In a Moment
"Even Real"	2005	In a Moment
"Mislead"	2005	In a Moment
"Get Me There"	2005	In a Moment
"Rhythm of Life"	2005	In a Moment
"Never Said"	2005	In a Moment
"Rode Away"	2005	In a Moment
"We All Run"	2005	In a Moment
"Stay (Coffee House Version)"	2005	In a Moment
"Remember to Breathe"	2009	Remember to Breathe
"Seven Deadly Sins"	2009	Remember to Breathe
"Unlove"	2009	Remember to Breathe
"Fix You"	2014	Non-album releases by The Voice of Holland
"Waves"	2014	Non-album releases by The Voice of Holland
"Zombie"	2014	Non-album releases by The Voice of Holland
"Waiting On a Lifetime"	2014	6 Degrees
"Falling"	2014	6 Degrees
"Six Degrees to Go"	2014	6 Degrees
"Another Way In, Another Way Out"	2014	6 Degrees
"Fishing for the Moon"	2014	6 Degrees
"Only You"	2014	6 Degrees
"Keep it Light" (with Mitchell Brunings)	2014	6 Degrees
"Give Me Simple"	2014	6 Degrees
"Cried Enough"	2014	6 Degrees
"Crazy Stupid Love"	2014	6 Degrees
"Cathy (The Day You Saved My Life)"	2014	6 Degrees
"Carry Me (The Red Cross Song)"	2015	Non-album single (Netherlands Red Cross 2015 song)
"Light the Sky"	2024	Non-album single release by The Voice of Germany
"Another Way In, Another Way Out"	2024	Non-album live releases by The Voice of Germany
"Dreams"	2024	Non-album live releases by The Voice of Germany
"Crying in the Rain"	2024	Non-album live releases by The Voice of Germany
"Angel"	2024	Non-album live releases by The Voice of Germany
"Easy on Me"	2024	Non-album live releases by The Voice of Germany

Awards and achievements
Preceded by Malou Lovis Kreyelkamp	The Voice of Germany; Winner; 2024	Succeeded by Anne Mosters
