= Happy Birthday to Me =

Happy Birthday to Me may refer to:

== Film and television ==
- Happy Birthday to Me (1981 film), a Canadian slasher film
- Happy Birthday to Me, a 1998 short film starring Brendan Coyle
- Happy Birthday to Me (2024 film), an Indian Kannada-language black comedy film
- "Happy Birthday to Me" (Scream), a 2016 television episode

== Music ==
- Happy Birthday to Me (album), a 1997 album by the Muffs
- "Happy Birthday to Me" (Hank Locklin song), 1961
- "Happy Birthday to Me", a song by Bulldog Mansion from Funk
- "Happy Birthday to Me", a song by Cracker from Cracker
- "Happy Birthday to Me", a song by Dana Valery
- "Happy Birthday to Me", a song by Epik High from [e]
- "Happy Birthday to Me", a song by Kokia from Remember Me
- "Happy Birthday to Me", a song by Reinhard Mey from Keine ruhige Minute
- "Happy Birthday to Me", a song by Rose Melberg from Portola
- "Happy Birthday to Me", a song by The Vandals from Live Fast, Diarrhea
- "Happy Birthday to Me", a song from the touring stage show Barney's Big Surprise
- "Happy Birthday to Me (Feb. 15)", a song by Bright Eyes, a B-side of the single "Drunk Kid Catholic"

== Literature ==
- "Happy Birthday to Me", a short story by Alison Venugoban published in the 2001 anthology Nor of Human
- "Happy Birthday to Me", a chapter of the manga Hayate the Combat Butler

== See also ==
- Happy Happy Birthday To Me Records, an American record label
