= Reinhard Mey =

German Liedermacher (born 1942)

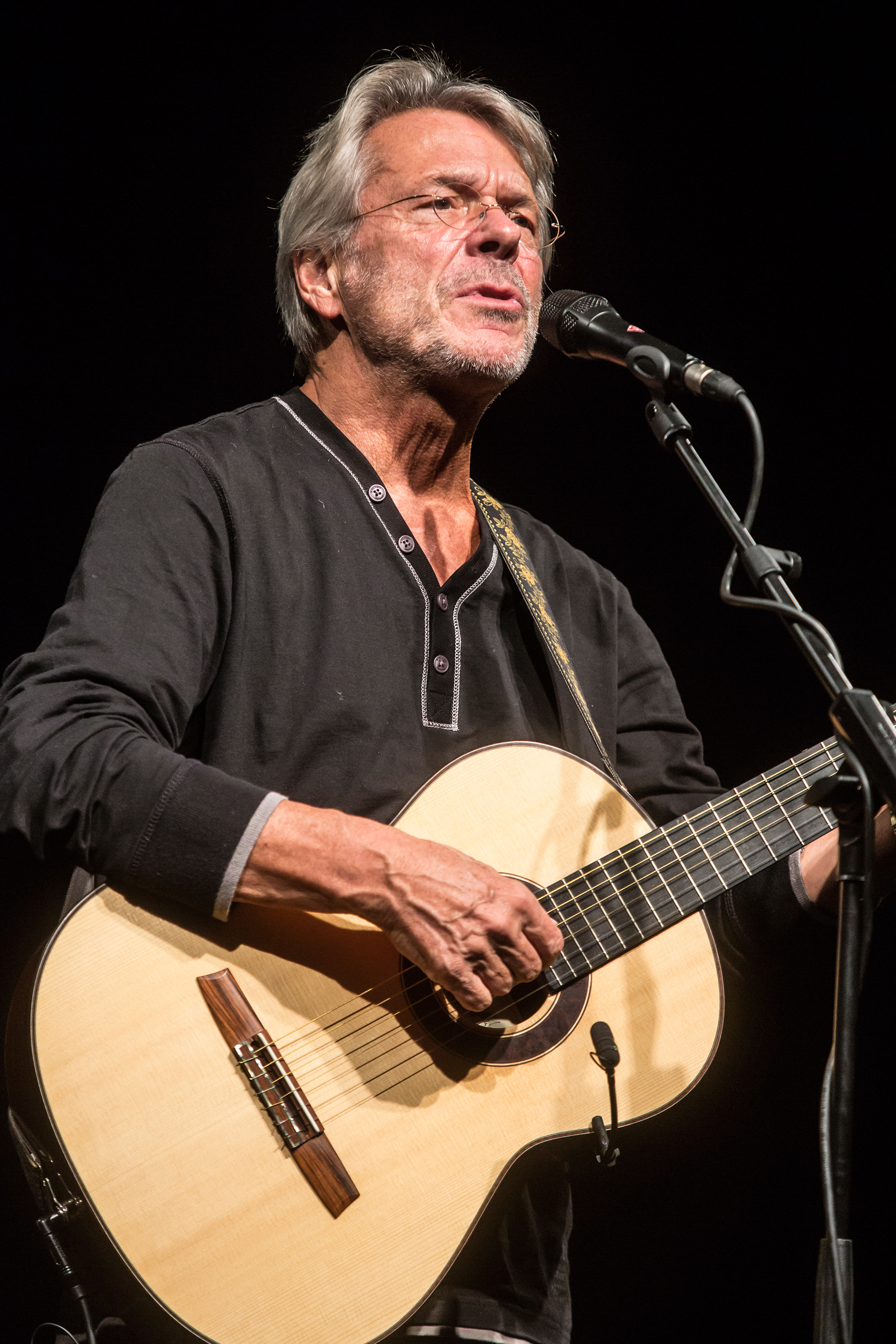
- Mey performing in 2014

Background information
- Also known as: Frédérik Mey (in France); Alfons Yondrascheck
- Born: Reinhard Friedrich Michael Mey; 21 December 1942 (age 83); Berlin, Germany
- Genres: Folk, chanson, skiffle
- Occupations: Musician, singer, songwriter
- Instruments: Vocals, guitar, trumpet
- Years active: 1965–present
- Label: EMI
- Website: www.reinhard-mey.de

Reinhard Friedrich Michael Mey (born 21 December 1942) is a German Liedermacher (lit. 'songmaker', a German-style singer-songwriter). In France, he is known as Frédérik Mey.

By 2009, Mey had released 27 German albums, and generally releases a new album approximately every two years; his first album was Ich wollte wie Orpheus singen (1967); the most recent studio album is Das Haus an der Ampel (2020). His biggest success to date was Mein Achtel Lorbeerblatt (1972). His most famous song by far is "Über den Wolken" (1974), which numerous German artists have covered. Mey is known to embark upon an extensive concert tour every two or three years, with a live album released from each tour.

== Biography ==
Reinhard Mey was born on 21 December 1942, in Berlin, Germany, where he spent his childhood. At the age of 12, he had his first piano lesson, and at the age of 14 he got his first guitar. He taught himself how to play the trumpet. During his school years, he gained performance experience by playing Skiffle music with friends. In 1965, Mey was offered the chance to perform at a Liedermacher festival at Waldeck Castle, a converted castle ruin. This led to his first recording contract. In 1961, he became part of the group Les Trois Affamés, with Schobert Schulz.

In 1963, Mey graduated from the French Gymnasium in Berlin, receiving the German Abitur as well as the French Baccalauréat, and thereafter began vocational training as an industrial trader at Schering AG Berlin. He broke off his university studies in economics to concentrate on songwriting and singing, and has been a successful performer in Germany, France, and in the Netherlands ever since. He has written songs in German, French, Dutch and English. He records his French material under the name of Frédérik Mey. In 1967, he married a French woman named Christine. Their marriage was dissolved in 1976.

Today, Mey lives in Berlin-Frohnau in his second marriage (since 1977) to Hella Hennies (born in Hanover), and had three children in the marriage: Frederik (born 20 November 1976), Maximilian (born 28 January 1982; died May 2014), and Victoria-Luise (born 19 November 1985).

His son Maximilian died in May 2014 after five years in a persistent vegetative state. Undiagnosed severe pneumonia had led to a cardio-pulmonary arrest, from which Maximilian was resuscitated after eight minutes of hypoxia.

== Lyrics and political views ==
Mey writes both sensitive and humorous songs, with subject matter taken mostly from his everyday life and surroundings. His themes include life on the road, his hobbies (e.g., flying), childhood memories, his family life and surroundings, and occasionally politics.

Mey's politics tend to be moderate to left-leaning. He speaks out in particular for freedom and non-violence, not only in his songs (for example, he participated in a demonstration at the beginning of 2003 against the coming war in Iraq). Nevertheless, his Annabelle criticises female political correct deadly-serious non-serene activism; Mey is later said to have repented of it and wrote another song in response to himself. Strongly influenced by the French chanson, Mey's political songs were relatively scarce among his works at the beginning; however, they have increased in quantity over time, such that there is usually at least one song about politics on each new album. His 2004 album, Nanga Parbat, for example, includes "Alles OK in Guantanamo Bay", a song critical of the U.S. detention facility in Cuba. The song "Das Narrenschiff" from his 1998 album Flaschenpost has enjoyed increasing popularity, likely due to its apocalyptic description of a seemingly more and more corrupt and insane world headed for disaster.

Mey's pacifist songs are often cited in debates about the reestablishment of compulsory military service in Germany. Especially with the song written 1986 "Nein, meine Söhne geb ich nicht" he said that no reason would justify militarization. Under no circumstances he would send his two sons to the military and he would "rather flee with them, than to allow you to make them [your] servants". In 2020 Mey republished the song as a collaboration with multiple German artists. Mey also signed an open letter calling for the German government to focus more on diplomacy in the Russo-Ukrainian war and to reduce weapon exports to Ukraine.

For years, Mey has been an avid vegetarian, and also has been active in the German chapter of the organisation People for the Ethical Treatment of Animals (PETA). Several of his songs deal with the theme of prevention of cruelty to animals, the most famous one being "Die Würde des Schweins ist unantastbar" (roughly, "a pig's dignity is inviolable.", echoing the first sentence of the first article of the German constitution).

== Theme music ==
The first bars of Reinhard Mey's Gute Nacht, Freunde have been used since 1976 as the beginning of the theme tune for the popular Dutch radio show Met het Oog op Morgen, broadcast every night from 23:00 until midnight on Radio 1. After the words "und ein letztes Glas im Steh'n", the Mey song fades away and an orchestra takes over.

== Awards ==
- 1968 Prix International de la Chanson française (the first non-French singer to receive this award)
- 1972 Grand Prix du Disque
- 1983 Verdienstkreuz am Bande (Cross of Merit on ribbon)
- 2001 Verdienstkreuz 1. Klasse (Cross of Merit, First class)

== Selected discography ==
=== German ===
==== Studio albums ====
- 1967 – Ich wollte wie Orpheus singen
- 1968 – Ankomme Freitag, den 13.
- 1970 – Aus meinem Tagebuch
- 1971 – Ich bin aus jenem Holze
- 1972 – Mein achtel Lorbeerblatt
- 1974 – Wie vor Jahr und Tag
- 1975 – Ikarus
- 1977 – Menschenjunges
- 1979 – Keine ruhige Minute
- 1980 – Jahreszeiten
- 1981 – Freundliche Gesichter
- 1983 – Die Zwölfte
- 1985 – Hergestellt in Berlin
- 1986 – Alleingang
- 1988 – Balladen
- 1990 – Farben
- 1992 – Alles geht
- 1994 – Immer weiter
- 1996 – Leuchtfeuer
- 1998 – Flaschenpost
- 2000 – Einhandsegler
- 2002 – Rüm Hart
- 2004 – Nanga Parbat
- 2007 – Bunter Hund
- 2010 – Mairegen
- 2013 – Dann mach's gut
- 2016 – Mr. Lee
- 2020 – Das Haus an der Ampel
- 2024 – Nach Haus

==== Live albums ====
- 1971 – Reinhard Mey live
- 1974 – 20.00 Uhr
- 1978 – Unterwegs
- 1981 – Tournee
- 1984 – Live '84
- 1987 – Die grosse Tournee '86
- 1991 – Mit Lust und Liebe
- 1995 – Zwischen Zürich und zu Haus
- 1997 – Lebenszeichen
- 1999 – Lampenfieber
- 2002 – Solo – Die Einhandsegler Tournee
- 2003 – Klaar Kiming
- 2006 – !ich kann
- 2009 – Danke Liebe Gute Fee
- 2012 – Gib mir Musik!
- 2015 – dann mach's gut Live
- 2018 – Mr. Lee Live
- 2023 – In Wien – The Song Maker

==== Compilation albums ====
- 1973 – Mädchen in den Schänken (Compilation of 7-inch 45 rpm singles)
- 1973 – Alles was ich habe
- 1977 – Starportrait
- 1982 – Starportrait 2, Welch ein Geschenk ist ein Lied
- 1987 – Die großen Erfolge
- 1989 – Mein Apfelbäumchen
- 1990 – Die Story (6-CD-Release Bertelsmann Buchclub)
- 1993 – Ich liebe dich
- 1997 – Du bist ein Riese ...
- 2000 – Peter und der Wolf / Tierballaden
- 2003 – Über den Wolken – Lieder aus 4 Jahrzehnten
- 2005 – Frei!
- 2013 – Jahreszeiten
- 2015 – Lieder von Freunden

==== Singles ====
- 1965 – Geh und fang den Wind / Drei Lilien (Debut single; German cover version of Donovan's "Catch The Wind" under the pseudonym Rainer May)
- 1966 – 25 00 30 Fred Kasulzke protestazki / Frau Pohl / Vertreterbesuch / Ballade / Bauer ich bitt euch (EP)
- 1966 – Die drei Musketiere / Schuttabladeplatz der Zeit / Abgesang / Mein Kanapee (EP)
- 1968 – Diplomatenjagd / Komm, giess mein Glas noch einmal ein
- 1969 – Ich hab' nur Dich gekannt / Der Weg zurück
- 1970 – Die Ballade vom Pfeifer / Ankomme, Freitag, den 13.
- 1970 – In meinem Zimmer fällt leis' der Regen / Ein Krug aus Stein
- 1971 – Die heisse Schlacht am kalten Buffet / Neun... und vorbei
- 1971 – Der Mörder ist immer der Gärtner / Längst geschlossen sind die Läden
- 1972 – Annabelle, ach Annabelle / Bevor ich mit den Wölfen heule
- 1973 – Trilogie auf Frau Pohl / Das Geheimnis im Hefeteig oder der Schuss im Backofen
- 1973 – Aber Deine Ruhe findest Du nicht mehr / Zwei Hühner auf dem Weg nach Vorgestern
- 1974 – Mann aus Alemannia / Über den Wolken
- 1974 – Gute Nacht Freunde / Musikanten sind in der Stadt
- 1974 – Über den Wolken / Der alte Bär ist tot und sein Käfig leer
- 1975 – Es gibt Tage, da wünscht' ich, ich wär' mein Hund / Es bleibt eine Narbe zurück
- 1975 – Hab Erdöl im Garten / Ich bin Klempner von Beruf
- 1977 – Ist mir das peinlich / Mein erstes graues Haar
- 1977 – Einen Antrag auf Erteilung eines Antragsformulars / Menschenjunges
- 1978 – Daddy Blue / Alles ist gut
- 1979 – Keine ruhige Minute / Dieter Malinek, Ulla und ich
- 1979 – Dr. Nahtlos, Dr. Sägeberg und Dr. Hein / Was weiss ich schon von Dir?
- 1980 – Wir sind lauter arme, kleine Würstchen / Freunde, lasst uns trinken
- 1980 – Sommermorgen / Bei Ilse und Willi auf'm Land
- 1981 – Müllmänner-Blues / Das Leben ist ...
- 1983 – Was in der Zeitung steht / Ich würde gern einmal in Dresden singen
- 1983 – Hilf mir / Ich habe nie mehr Langeweile
- 1984 – Rundfunkwerbung-Blues
- 1984 – Frohe Weihnacht / Alles ist so schön verpackt
- 1985 – Lasst sie reisen / Ich grüsse ...
- 1990 – Alle Soldaten woll'n nach Haus'
- 1986 – Nein, meine Söhne geb' ich nicht
- 1992 – Das Etikett (Promo-Single)
- 1994 – 51er Kapitän
- 1996 – Lilienthals Traum
- 1998 – Die 12 Weihnachtstage (Adaptation of the British Christmas song "The Twelve Days of Christmas") / Willst Du Dein Herz mir schenken
- 2000 – Einhandsegler
- 2000 – Ich bring' Dich durch die Nacht (Promo-Single)

==== With other artists ====
- 1986 – Ein Loch in der Kanne (Live with Rainhard Fendrich)
- 1996 – Liebe, Schnaps & Tod (with Hannes Wader and Klaus Hoffmann)
- 1999 – Einfach abhau'n, einfach geh'n (Maxi-CD, with Ina Deter)
- 2003 – Mey, Wader, Wecker – Das Konzert (live with Hannes Wader and Konstantin Wecker)

==== DVDs ====
- 2003 – Klaar Kiming
- 2009 – Danke liebe gute Fee

=== British albums ===
- 1970 – One Vote for tomorrow

=== French albums ===
==== Studio ====
- 1968 – Frédérik Mey, Vol. 1
- 1972 – Frédérik Mey, Vol. 2
- 1974 – Frédérik Mey, Vol. 3
- 1976 – Frédérik Mey, Vol. 4
- 1979 – Frédérik Mey, Vol. 5
- 1982 – Frédérik Mey, Vol. 6
- 2005 – Frédérik Mey, Vol. 7 – douce France

==== Live ====
- 1976 – Recital Frédérik Mey à l'Olympia
- 1979 – Bobino

=== Dutch singles ===
- 1975 – Als de dag van toen
- 1976 – Vergeef me als je kunt
- 1976 – Soms Zou Ik Mijn Hond Willen Zijn
