= Über den Wolken =

1974 song by Reinhard Mey

"Über den Wolken" is a song by the German singer-songwriter Reinhard Mey. It has become his most famous song and is one of the most popular modern folk songs in German speaking countries. The line from the song's refrain "Über den Wolken muss die Freiheit wohl grenzenlos sein" (Above the clouds freedom must know no limits) has become a well known German catchphrase.

"Über den Wolken" was originally published in 1974 on the album Wie vor Jahr und Tag and on the B-side of the single "Mann aus Alemannia". In the same year Mey wrote and published a French version as well, "Au-dessus des nuages". In 1976 Mey published a Dutch version, "Boven de wolken", the text of which, however, was not by Mey himself but is due to Dutch writer translating Mey's original German version.

== Background ==
Already as a child Mey was fascinated by planes. When he started to pursue his dream of flying himself as an adult, he could not do that in his hometown West Berlin due to restrictions imposed by the Cold War. Therefore, in 1973 he moved next to the JadeWeser Airport near Wilhelmshaven in Lower Saxony to receive his flying instructions and pilot license there. His observations and experiences at this airport provided the inspiration for his famous song.

== Content ==
The song describes thoughts and observations of a person watching a plane taking off at an airport and feeling left behind. The refrain of the song is suggesting feeling of freedom and escape and its first two lines have become a catchphrase in German. It goes as follows:

Über den Wolken
Muss die Freiheit wohl grenzenlos sein.
Alle Ängste, alle Sorgen
Sagt man
Blieben darunter verborgen
Und dann
Würde was uns groß und wichtig erscheint
Plötzlich nichtig und klein.

Above the clouds,
Freedom must know no limits,
All fears and sorrows,
They say
are hidden below [the clouds]
And then
Everything that has appeared so big and important
Suddenly feels vain and small.

The refrain of French version describes a similar sentiment, however the lines don't rhyme quite in the same way as the German version does. It goes as follows:

Au dessus des nuages
La liberté semble être infinie.
Toutes nos craintes et nos peines, dit-on,
En sont ensevelies sous l‘horizon,
Et tout ce qui nous accable et confond,
S‘y allège et s‘éclaircit.

== Reception ==
The German film director Christian Petzold recalls in an interview with the Tagesspiegel how he was sitting in a plane seeing it breaking through the cloud cover and this made appreciating Über den Wolken as a great song and continues to say:

Nie zuvor wurden Zeilen wie "Irgendjemand kocht Kaffee / in der Luftaufsichtsbaracke" gesungen. Was erzählt das Lied? Dass wir Deutschen nur über den Wolken frei atmen können, nicht auf Erden, nicht auf dem "nassen Asphalt" dieses Songs. Es ist das einzige gute deutsche Volkslied. Never before has somebody sung lines like "Irgendjemand kocht Kaffee / in der Luftaufsichtsbaracke". What is the song telling us? That Germans can only breathe freely above clouds, but not on the ground, not on the wet asphalt of this song. It is the only good German folk song.

— Christian Petzold, Tagesspiegel, 23 September 2014

The German journalist and writer Hilmar Klute describes the song in an article in the Süddeutsche Zeitung as a smart and poetic illustration of how the big reflects in the small. It elegantly weaves the powerful themes of freedom, fear and sorrows into the song and does them justice. Furthermore, Klute opines, that for creating a rhyme using "Jacke" and "Luftaufsichtsbaracke" alone Mey should have received the Friedrich-Hölderlin-Preis (literary award).

Gabrielle Werth writes in the Rolling Stone that Mey's carefully composed lines let even bulky words like "Luftaufsichtsbaracke" appear elegant and light. The description of his airport observations carries between the lines a feeling of overcoming fears and sorrows and a desire for "the lightness of being".

In an article in the Süddeutsche Zeitung by Holger Gertz Über den Wolken is described as a folk song of the best kind and it is suggested, that this song of desire about overcoming the daily sorrows has become a monument for the inner beauty of the German language.

In East Germany, where Mey could not perform during the Cold War era, the song was strongly associated with the notion of freedom. This was in particular due to the lines from the refrain and one of the reasons the East German leadership banned Mey from performing. Finally in 1989 Mey was allowed to perform in the East German TV show Showkolade in Dresden. Originally he had been required not to sing "Über den Wolken" during his performance, but due to the fall of the Berlin Wall shortly before the day of the performance, he ended up singing it nevertheless.

The actress Katrin Sass, who had grown up in East Germany, presented "Über den Wolken" as her personal song classic on the radio station Deutschlandfunk and stated:

Klassiker sage ich einfach dazu, weil das mich schon über Jahrzehnte begleitet. Ich konnte es ja auch im Osten hören. Und im Osten war es ein ganz starkes Gefühl von Freiheit.[...] Also, wenn Reinhard Mey dieses Lied sang, das gab´s ja nicht in unseren Sendern. Das habe ich dann im Deutschlandradio oder so gehört, ich hatte dann immer ein Gefühl von Freiheit, egal, wo man landet, es ist immer die Freiheit. Also, wegzufliegen. I call it a classic because the song has been with me for decades. I was able to hear it in the East as well. And in the East it generated a strong feeling of freedom. [...] When Reinhard Mey was singing this song it wasn't covered by our stations, but I listened to it on the Deutschlandradio and others. It always gave me a strong feeling of freedom, no matter where you land, you always had the option to leave by taking off.

— Katrin Sass, Deutschlandfunk, 17 September 2013

In an episode of the series Unsere Besten of the German broadcaster ZDF on the 100 best German songs "Über den Wolken" was ranked 4th.

At the occasion of Mey's 80th birthday the German broadcaster Rundfunk Berlin-Brandenburg devoted an episode of its series 30 Favoriten (30 favourites) to his songs. A jury consisting of 10 members was tasked to select and rank the 30 best songs by Mey. Über den Wolken reached the first place followed by Gute Nacht, Freunde and a combined Dutch and French version of the song was ranked 29th.

== Live recordings, covers and adaptions ==
Mey himself wrote the French version of his song Au-dessus des nuages himself and it was published in 1974 in his French album Frédérik Mey Volume 3. First live recordings of it appeared on the French live album Recital Frédérik Mey à l’Olympia (1976) and on the German live album Unterwegs (1978). Mey published the Dutch version Boven de wolken on his album Er Zijn Dagen (1976). Its text however was not written by him, but the Belgian singer-songwriter Marcel Uyttersprot, who translated Meys German version. In 2013 Mey appeared in an episode of the Sesamstraße, where he sang a modified version of his song and commented later that he really enjoyed the experience and this version of the song.

Over the years there have been a variety of cover versions, among them one in Schlager style by Dieter Thomas Kuhn (1994) and one by Xavier Naidoo (2002). The German country group Texas Lightning published 2005 with Over the Mountains an English version.

The German comedian Otto Waalkes used the melody of Über den Wolken to write a parody song called Unter den Wolken (under the clouds, 2001) in which he describes the unpleasantness of flying economy class. The Austrian band Erste Allgemeine Verunsicherung published the song Unter den Bäumen (under the trees, 2003), which is using textual and melodic motives from Über den Wolken and is referencing to it. A similar approach was used in the song Unter den Wolken (below the clouds, 2017) by the German punk band Die Toten Hosen.
