= Keine ruhige Minute =

Kein ruhige Minute

Studio album by Reinhard Mey
- Released: 1979
- Label: Intercord
- Producer: Walther Richter

Reinhard Mey chronology
Menschenjunges (1977)	Kein ruhige Minute (1979)	Jahreszeiten (1980)

Keine ruhige Minute is the ninth album by the singer-songwriter Reinhard Mey. All songs were written by Mey. It was the 40th in the German charts in its first week on 28 May 1979.

== Track listing ==
1. Happy birthday to me 5: 12
2. Dieter Malinek, Ulla und ich 3: 51
3. Dr. Nahtlos, Dr. Sägeberg und Dr. Hein 4: 45
4. Von Kammerjägern, Klarsichthüllen, von dir und mir 2: 30
5. Zeugnistag 4: 20
6. Alles ist gut 3: 33
7. Keine ruhige Minute 2: 26
8. Erinnerungen 3: 23
9. Daddy Blue 5: 05
10. Von Luftschlössern, die zerbrochen sind 3: 20
11. Was weiss ich schon von dir? 3: 10
12. Ab heut' und ab hier 3: 00
