= Wie vor Jahr und Tag =

Studio album by Reinhard Mey
- Released: 1974
- Label: Intercord
- Producer: Walther Richter

Reinhard Mey chronology
Mein achtel Lorbeerblatt (1972)	Wie vor Jahr und Tag (1974)	Ikarus (1975)

Wie vor Jahr und Tag is the sixth album by Reinhard Mey. It was also published in Dutch in 1975. All songs (except Susann) were written by Mey.

== Track listing ==
1. Was kann schöner sein auf Erden, als Politiker zu werden 3:05
2. Susann 3:00 (Toni Vescoli)
3. Ich bin Klempner von Beruf 3:25
4. Zwei Hühner auf dem Weg nach vorgestern 3:25
5. Der alte Bär ist tot und sein Käfig leer 5:30
6. Mein Testament 4:37
7. Wie vor Jahr und Tag 4:36
8. Über den Wolken 3:45
9. Es gibt keine Maikäfer mehr 4:12
10. Wie ein Baum, den man fällt 3:43
11. Aber deine Ruhe findest du trotz alledem nicht mehr 3:47
12. Die Zeit des Gauklers ist vorbei 4:15
