= Kamrad =

German singer

Tim Kamrad
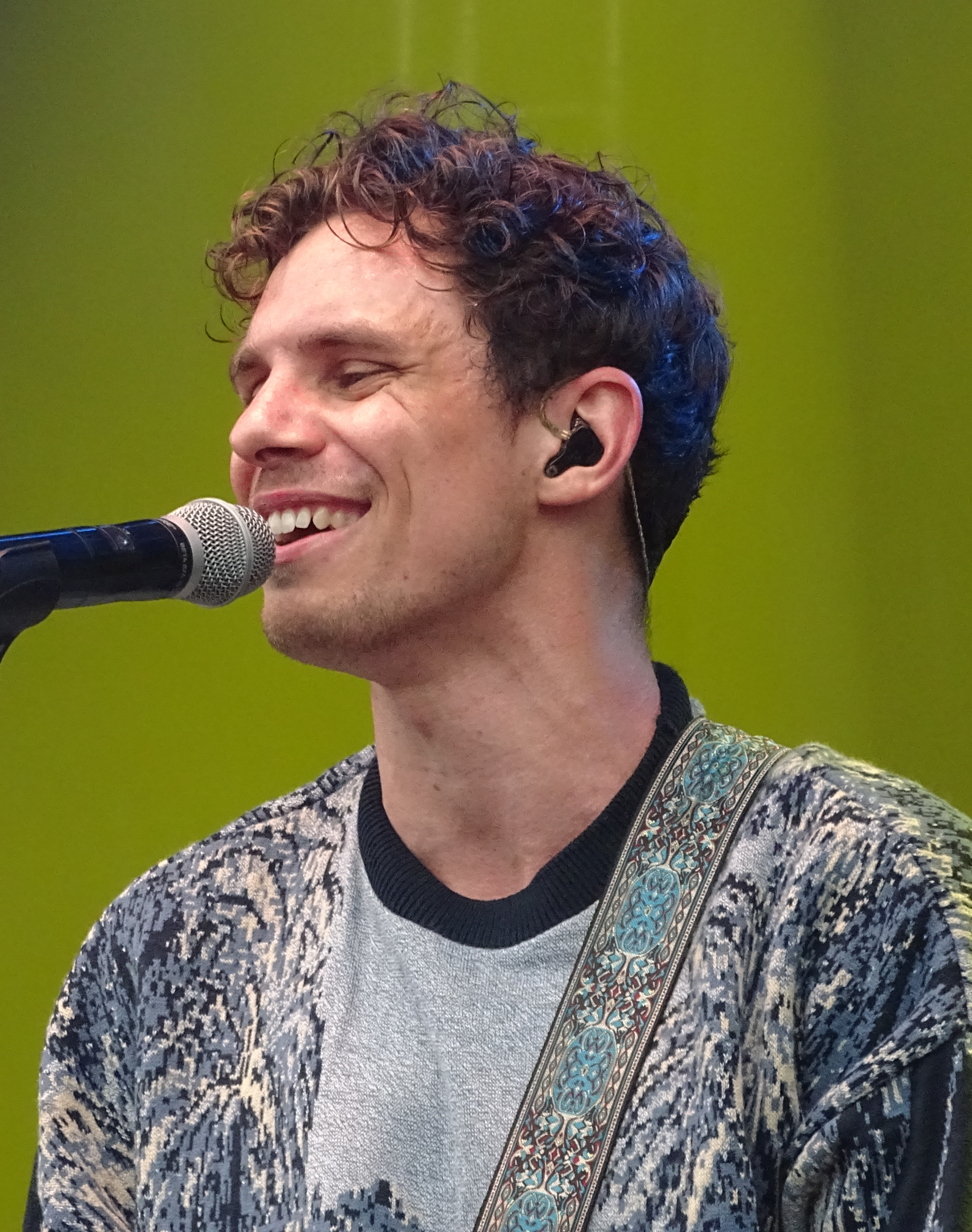
- Kamrad in 2022
- Born: April 10, 1997 (age 29); Wuppertal, North Rhine-Westphalia, Germany
- Occupation: Singer
- Years active: 2016–present
- Musical career
- Genres: Pop; R&B; EDM
- Instruments: Vocals; guitar
- Website: kamrad-music.com

Tim Kamrad (born April 10, 1997), or also as Kamrad (stylized as KAMRAD), is a German singer-songwriter. After the success of his debut single "Changes", In 2025 he released the popular global hit single "Be Mine".

== Career ==
Tim Kamrad grew up in Langenberg, a borough of Velbert. He participated in school choir, where he developed a passion for singing and playing the guitar. After smaller band projects and his first songwriting experiences, he worked with Motor Music's Rent-A-Record Company service, releasing his first single with the company on October 7, 2016. Next, "Changes" was published as his first single.

In November 2016, Kamrad appeared in the supporting program of Lions Head on the tour See You Tour Part II through Germany and Austria. Kamrad played on December 15, 2016 in Cologne as the opening act for the band ABC.

On February 24, 2017, Kamrad's debut EP Changes was released. In connection with this release, he was voted Newcomer of the Month for March on N-Joy, a Hamburg radio station. At the end of 2017, he performed for several dates of the club tour as the opening act for the German singer Lotte. In 2018, he supported Sunrise Avenue on their Heartbreak Century tour.

Since spring 2019 he has been recording his songs in his recording studio in Bochum-Langendreer. After releasing Down & Up, his debut album in 2018, and Not Good At Playing Love Songs, his second album in 2023, Kamrad found more fame. In 2024, Kamrad joined The Voice of Germany as a coach alongside Samu Haber, Yvonne Catterfeld, and Mark Forster.

== Discography ==
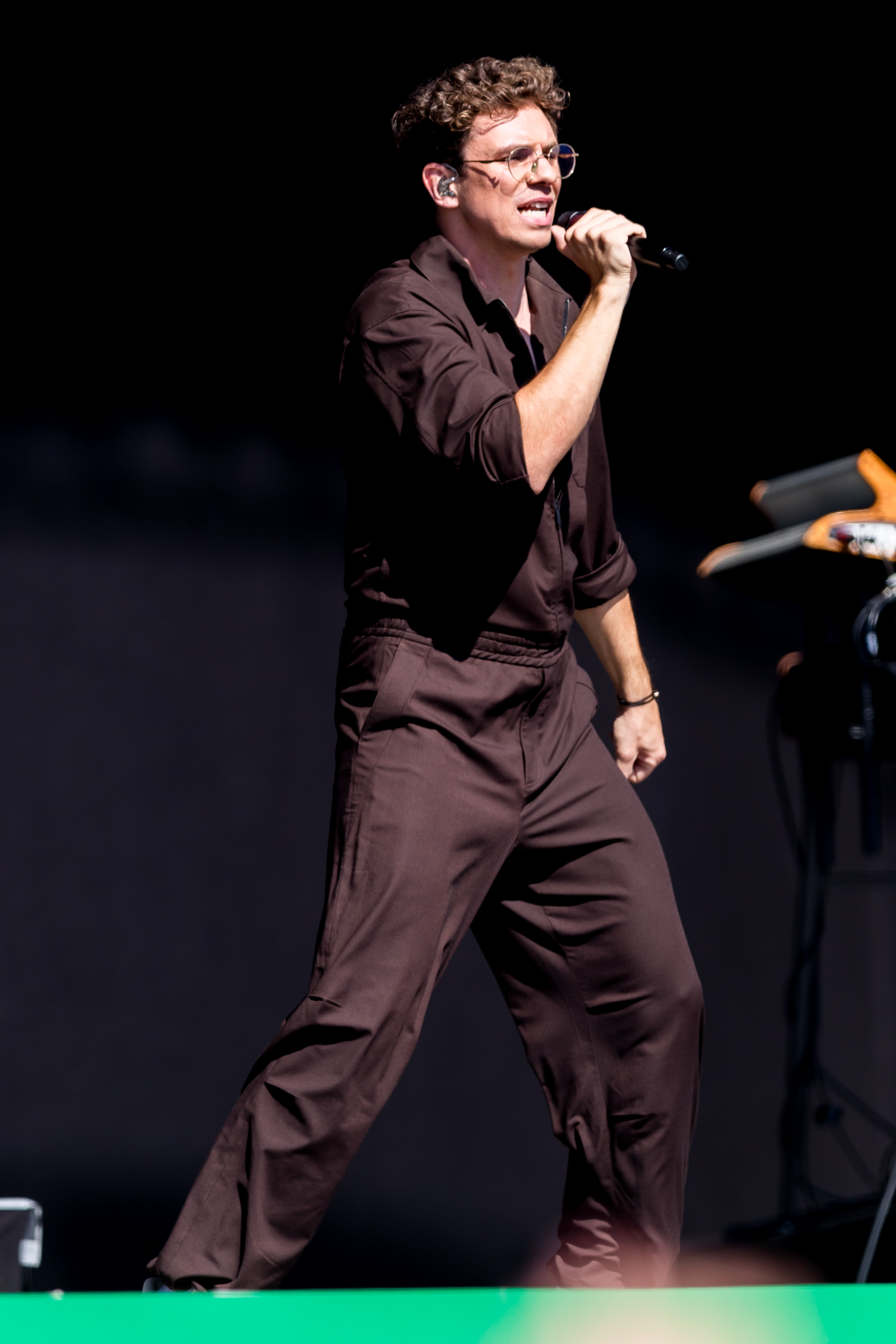
Kamrad performing in Hockenheim, Germany, September 2023

=== Albums ===
- 2018: Down & Up
- 2023: Not Good At Playing Love Songs
- 2024: Wanna Be Friends?
- 2026: Trying Not to Panic

=== EPs ===
- 2017: Changes

=== Singles ===
- 2016: "Changes"
- 2017: "Return"
- 2017: "Ruin Me"
- 2018: "Words 4 U"
- 2018: "You Don't Owe Me Your Love"
- 2018: "Heartbeat"
- 2018: "On You"
- 2018: "Holdin' On"
- 2019: "Fight (String Version)"
- 2019: "Closing In"
- 2020: "Outside"
- 2020: "Blame It on the Lights"
- 2021: "Dance with Danger"
- 2021: "Grow"
- 2022: "I Believe"
- 2022: "Better Days"
- 2023: "Feel Alive"
- 2023: "I'm Done"
- 2023: "You Feel Like Summer"
- 2023: "Never Get Older"
- 2023: "I Hope You End Up Alone (With Me)"
- 2024: "So Good"
- 2024: "Friends"
- 2025: "Be Mine"
- 2026: "Hug Yourself"
- 2026: "Love Sober"
