= The Kelly Family discography =

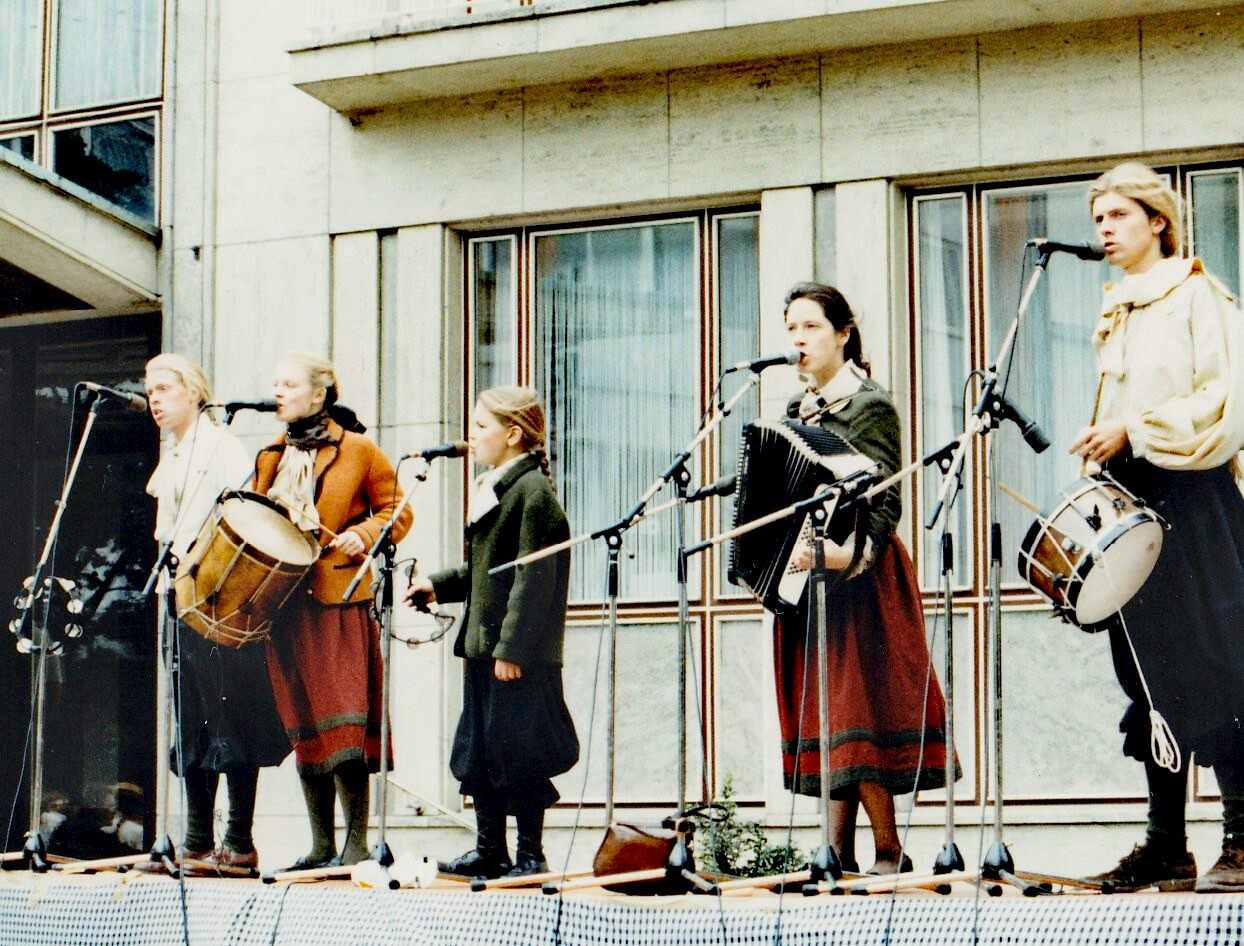
- Some members of The Kelly Family
- Studio albums: 22
- Live albums: 5
- Compilation albums: 7
- Singles: 57
- Music videos: 95
- EP: 2

The Kelly Family, a European pop music group of Irish, American, Spanish and German heritage, released 22 studio albums, four of them being holiday albums, five live albums, seven compilation albums, two extended plays and 57 singles, seven of them being Double A-Side singles. Since the late 1970s, the family have released more than 21 studio albums and 43 singles on Universal Music, Polydor, their own record company Kel-Life Records and a number of smaller labels, the most successful being Over the Hump and Almost Heaven and its first singles "An Angel" and "I Can't Help Myself".

Since the late 1990s, the lineup of the band has seen changes during different recording and touring phases, caused by family reasons, solo activities or other side projects. Altogether, The Kelly Family has sold more than 20 million records around the world, including 54 gold and platinum-certified albums.

== Albums ==
=== Studio albums ===
Year	Album	Chart positions							Certifications
Year	Album	AUT	BEL	GER	NLD	NOR	SWE	SWI	Certifications
1977	Kelly Family Tours Europe: Released: 1977; Label: —; Formats: CS	—	—	—	—	—	—	—	
1979	The Kelly Family: Released: March 5, 1979; Label: Polydor; Formats: CS, LP	—	—	—	—	—	—	—	
1979	Lieder der Welt: Released: 1979; Label: Polydor; Formats: CD, CS, LP	—	—	—	4	—	—	—	BVMI: Gold
1980	Ein Vogel kann im Käfig nicht fliegen: Released: 1980; Label: Polydor; Formats: CS, LP	—	—	—	—	—	—	—	
1981	Wonderful World!: Released: 1981; Label: Kel-Life; Formats: CD, CS, LP	—	—	—	—	—	—	—	
1984	Une famille c'est une chanson: Released: 1984; Label: Eddy Barclay; Formats: CS, LP	—	—	—	—	—	—	—	
1989	Keep on Singing...: Released: 1989; Label: Kel-Life/Dino; Formats: CD, CS, LP	—	—	—	—	—	—	—	
1990	New World: Released: 1990; Label: Kel-Life/Dino; Formats: CD, CS, LP	—	—	—	—	—	—	—	
1991	Honest Workers: Released: 1991; Label: Kel-Life/Dino; Formats: CD, CS, LP	—	—	—	—	—	—	—	
1993	Wow: Released: 1993; Label: Kel-Life/Sattva; Formats: CD, CS, LP	—	—	38	—	—	—	—	
1994	Over the Hump: Released: 1994; Label: Kel-Life/EMI; Formats: CD, CS, LP	1	—	1	24	26	—	1	BVMI: 9× Gold; IFPI Austria: 2× Platinum; ZPAV: 3× Platinum; IFPI Switzerland: 2× Platinum; IFPI Europe: Platinum; FIMI: Gold; PROMUSICAE: Platinum
1996	Almost Heaven: Released: October 25, 1996; Label: Kel-Life/EMI; Formats: CD, CS, LP	1	19	1	3	2	—	1	ZPAV: 3× Platinum; IFPI Norway: Platinum; IFPI Europe: Platinum; IFPI Austria: 2× Platinum; BVMI: 2× Platinum; IFPI Switzerland: 2× Platinum; PROMUSICAE: Platinum
1997	Growin' Up: Released: November 3, 1997; Label: Kel-Life/EMI; Formats: CD, LP	5	10	1	4	27	59	3	LV: Gold; ZPAV: Gold; IFPI Switzerland: Platinum; IFPI Austria: Gold
1998	From Their Hearts: Released: November 2, 1998; Label: Kel-Life/EMI; Formats: CD, LP	14	21	3	17	—	—	12	
2002	La Patata: Released: April 8, 2002; Label: Kel-Life/Polydor; Formats: CD, LP, DVD	35	32	3	16	—	—	63	
2004	Homerun: Released: June 7, 2004; Label: Polydor; Formats: CD, LP, DVD	52	—	9	36	—	—	—	
2017	We Got Love: Released: March 24, 2017; Label: Airforce1, Universal Music; Formats: CD, LP	1	34	1	18	—	—	3	BMVI: 5× Gold; IFPI Austria: Gold
2019	25 Years Later: Released: 25 October 2019; Label: Airforce1, Universal Music; Formats: CD, LP	1	26	1	40	—	—	2	

=== Holiday albums ===
Year	Album	Chart positions					Certifications
Year	Album	AUT	BEL	GER	NLD	SWI	Certifications
1980	Festliche Stunden bei der Kelly Family: Released: 1980; Label: Polydor; Formats: CS, LP	—	—	—	—	—	BMVI: Gold
1980	Kelly Family Loves Christmas and You: Released: 1980; Label: Kel-Life; Formats: CS, LP	—	—	—	—	—	
1981	Christmas All Year: Released: 1981; Label: Kel-Life; Formats: CD, CS, LP	—	—	—	—	—	
1994	Christmas for All: Released: 1995; Label: Kel-Life/EMI; Formats: CD, CS, LP	1	—	2	—	2	BMVI: Gold; ZPAV: Gold; IFPI Austria: Platinum; IFPI Switzerland: Platinum
2022	Christmas Party: Released: 4 November 2022; Label: Airforce1, Universal; Formats: CD, CS, LP	4	49	2	77	5	

=== Live albums ===
Year	Album	Chart positions				
Year	Album	AUT	BEL	GER	NLD	SWI
1988	Live: Released: March 12, 1988; Label: Kel-Life; Formats: CD, CS, LP	—	—	—	36	—
1992	Streetlife: Released: 1992; Label: Kel-Life; Formats: CD, CS, LP	—	—	—	—	—
1998	Live, Live, Live: Released: May 16, 1998; Label: Kel-Life; Formats: CD, LP	21	—	46	—	24
2012	Stille Nacht - Live-CD 2011: Released: September 2012; Label: Pink Production, Kel-Life; Formats: CD	—	—	—	—	—
2013	Stille Nacht 2012: Label: Pink Production, Kel-Life; Formats: CD	—	—	—	—	—
2017	We Got Love Live: Released: October 20, 2017; Label: Airforce1 (Universal); Formats: Double CD	—	61	—	60	—
2020	25 Years Later: Live: Released: April 3, 2020; Label: Airforce1 (Universal); Formats: CD, download, streaming	—	40	—	59	—
2024	Tough Road: Live at Westfalenhalle '94: Released: May 15, 2024; Label: Kel-Life; Formats: CD, download, streaming	10	—	5	—	9

=== Compilations ===
Year	Album	Chart positions					Certifications
Year	Album	AUT	BEL	GER	NLD	SWI	Certifications
1980	Stargala (unofficial): Released: 1980; Label: Polydor NL; Formats: CS, LP	—	—	—	—	—	
1984	Unsere schönsten deutschen Lieder (unofficial): Released: 1984; Label: Allstar; Formats: CS, LP	—	—	—	—	—	
1993	The Very Best – Over 10 Years: Released: 1993; Label: Kel-Life; Formats: CD, CS, LP	—	—	—	—	22	
1994	Meisterstücke (unofficial): Released: 1994; Label: Polydor; Formats: CD, LP	—	—	—	—	—	BMVI: Gold
1998	The Bonus-Tracks Album: Released: July 12, 1998; Label: Kel-Life/Ariola; Formats: CD, LP	—	—	46	31	—	
1999	Best of The Kelly Family: Released: October 4, 1999; Label: Kel-Life; Formats: CD, LP	43	15	14	35	20	
1999	Best of The Kelly Family 2: Released: November 29, 1999; Label: Kel-Life; Formats: CD, LP	—	33	29	—	54	
2005	Hope: Released: November 10, 2005; Label: Formats: CD	—	—	—	—	—	

=== Box sets ===
Year	Details
1996	The First Singles: Released: 1996; Label: Formats: 5-CD box
2011	The Complete Story: Released: 2011; Label: Formats: 4-CD box

== Extended plays ==
Year	Details
1978	Familia Kelly Canta La Navidad: Released: 1978; Label: —; Formats: CS
2021	One More Happy Christmas: Released: 2021; Label: —; Formats: CD

== Singles ==
Year	Single	Chart positions							Certifications	Album
Year	Single	AUT	BEL	GER	IRE	NLD	NOR	SWI	Certifications	Album
1978	"Danny Boy"	—	—	—	—	—	—	—		Kelly Family
1978	"Agur Jaunak"	—	—	—	—	—	—	—		Kelly Family
1979	"Eagle on the Breeze"	—	—	—	—	—	—	—		Lieder der Welt
1979	"Knick-Knack-Song (This Old Man)"	—	—	—	—	—	—	—		Lieder der Welt
1979	"David's Song (Who'll Come with Me)"	—	4	15	—	1	—	—		Lieder der Welt
1979	"The Last Rose of Summer"	—	27	—	—	44	—	—		Lieder der Welt
1979	"Join This Parade (Scotland the Brave)"	—	—	—	—	—	—	—		Lieder der Welt
1980	"Ein Vogel kann im Käfig nicht fliegen"	—	—	—	—	—	—	—		Ein Vogel kann im Käfig nicht fliegen
1980	"Alle Kinder brauchen Freunde (Child)"	—	—	—	—	—	—	—		Ein Vogel kann im Käfig nicht fliegen
1980	"Die Vogelhochzeit"	—	—	—	—	—	—	—		Ein Vogel kann im Käfig nicht fliegen
1980	"Estudiantina Portuguesa" (unofficial)	—	—	—	—	—	—	—		Stargala
1984	"Old McDonald"	—	—	—	—	—	—	—		Wonderful World!
1984	"Amazing Grace"	—	—	—	—	—	—	—		Wonderful World!
1984	"Une Famille c'est une Chanson"	—	—	—	—	—	—	—		Une Famille c'est une Chanson
1984	"Didelidei" (Version One)	—	—	—	—	—	—	—		Une Famille c'est une Chanson
1984	"Eine Familie ist wie Ein Lied"	—	—	—	—	—	—	—		Non-album single
1984	"Didelidei" (Version Two)	—	—	—	—	—	—	—		Non-album single
1985	"Hiroshima, I'm Sorry"	—	—	—	—	—	—	—		Non-album single
1986	"We Love the Pope"	—	—	—	—	—	—	—		Wonderful World!
1986	"Our Father"	—	—	—	—	—	—	—		Wonderful World!
1989	"Sean O'Kelley"	—	—	—	—	—	—	—		Keep on Singing...
1992	"House on the Ocean"	—	—	—	—	—	—	—		Streetlife
1993	"Key to My Heart"	—	—	—	—	—	—	—		Streetlife
1993	"No Lies"	—	—	—	—	—	—	—		Wow
1993	"When the Last Tree..."	—	—	—	—	—	—	—		Wow
1993	"One More Freakin' Dollar"	—	—	—	—	—	—	—		Wow
1994	"An Angel"	1	—	2	5	40	—	2	BMVI: 3× Gold; IFPI Austria: Platinum	Over the Hump
1995	"Why Why Why"	16	—	26	—	—	—	34		Over the Hump
1995	"Roses of Red"	—	—	15	—	—	—	21		Over the Hump
1995	"First Time"	16	—	19	25	—	—	19		Over the Hump
1996	"I Can't Help Myself"	2	11	1	—	1	1	1	BMVI: Platinum; IFPI Norway: 2× Platinum; IFPI Austria: Gold; IFPI Switzerland: Gold; ZPAV: Gold	Almost Heaven
1996	"Every Baby"	9	—	13	—	75	18	5		Almost Heaven
1996	"Gott Deine Kinder"	19	—	26	—	—	—	14		Der Glöckner von Note Dame
1997	"Fell in Love with an Alien"	15	30	15	—	3	—	14		Almost Heaven
1997	"Nanana"	23	—	17	—	—	—	6		Almost Heaven
1997	"When the Boys Come into Town"	29	—	37	—	—	—	32		Almost Heaven
1997	"Because It's Love"	2	—	3	—	13	—	3		Growin' Up
1997	"Red Shoes"	—	—	—	—	—	—	—		Growin' Up
1998	"One More Song"	23	—	19	—	37	—	32		Growin' Up
1998	"I Will Be Your Bride"	14	—	14	—	17	—	19		From Their Hearts
1999	"Oh, It Hurts"	—	—	57	—	57	—	—		From Their Hearts
1999	"Hooks"	—	—	57	—	57	—	—		From Their Hearts
1999	"I Really Love You"	—	—	—	—	—	—	—		From Their Hearts
1999	"The Children of Kosovo"	35	—	8	—	18	—	13		Best of The Kelly Family
1999	"Saban's Mystic Knights of Tir Na Nog"	—	—	27	—	22	—	47		Best of The Kelly Family 2
1999	"Mama"	40	—	14	—	27	—	86		Best of The Kelly Family 2
2000	"I Wanna Kiss You"	—	—	44	—	37	—	79		Best of The Kelly Family 2
2002	"I Wanna Be Loved"	—	—	31	—	—	—	—		La Patata
2002	"What's a Matter You People"	—	—	23	—	26	—	—		La Patata
2002	"Mrs. Speechless"	—	—	31	—	53	—	—		La Patata
2004	"Flip a Coin"	52	—	24	—	40	—	—		Homerun
2004	"Blood"	59	—	24	—	31	—	—		Homerun
2004	"Streets of Love"	72	—	52	—	—	—	—		Homerun
2017	"Nanana"	—	—	—	—	—	—	—		We Got Love
2019	"Over the Hump"	—	—	—	—	—	—	—		25 Years Later
2019	"Fire"	—	—	—	—	—	—	—		25 Years Later
2021	"One More Happy Christmas"	—	—	35	—	—	—	—		One More Happy Christmas

=== Promotional singles ===
- 1994: Cassette Sampler (MC)
- 1995: Quisiera ser un Ángel (MC)
- 1995: The Kelly Family canta Quisiera ser un Ángel y Santa Maria en Español (MC)
- 1995: Ares Qui (MC)
- 1999: Ein Herz Für Kinder Medley (CD, MC)
- 1999: Mela, Mela Nutella (CD, Vinyl)
- 2017: Good Neighbor (Digital download)
- 2017: Brothers and Sisters (Digital download)
- 2017: Please Don't Go – Live (Digital download)
