= We Got Love (album) =

Studio album by The Kelly Family
- Released: March 24, 2017
- Genre: Pop; rock; folk
- Length: 67:44
- Label: Airforce1; Universal Music
- Producer: Thorsten Brötzmann; Elephant Music; JEO; Kathy Kelly; Angelo Kelly

The Kelly Family chronology
Hope (2005)	We Got Love (2017)	25 Years Later (2019)

We Got Love is the fifteenth studio album by European-American pop group The Kelly Family. It was released by license to Airforce1 Records, a division of Universal Music, on March 24, 2017 throughout most of Central Europe.

This is the comeback album, released 13 years after the previous one and the band's breakup. The album contains remakes of old hits and the new material.

== Track listing ==
We Got Love – Standard edition
No.	Title	Writer(s)	Length
1.	"Nanana" (2017 version)	The Kelly Family	3:29
2.	"Fell in Love with an Alien" (2017 version)	The Kelly Family	3:24
3.	"An Angel" (2017 version with Emma Kelly)	The Kelly Family	3:54
4.	"Stand by Me"	Ben E. King; Jerry Leiber; Mike Stoller	3:31
5.	"First Time" (2017 version)	The Kelly Family	3:32
6.	"Good Neighbor" (2017 version)	The Kelly Family	3:38
7.	"Brothers and Sisters"	Patricia Kelly	4:14
8.	"Why Why Why" (2017 version)	The Kelly Family	3:25
9.	"I Can't Help Myself" (2017 version)	The Kelly Family	3:08
10.	"Imagine" (2017 version)	The Kelly Family	2:52
11.	"Come Back to Me" (2017 version)	The Kelly Family	3:43
12.	"Keep On Singing"	Angelo Kelly	3:32
13.	"We Got Love"	Jimmy Kelly	3:43
14.	"Who'll Come with Me (David's Song)" (2017 version featuring Papa Kelly)	The Kelly Family	3:11

We Got Love – Deluxe edition
No.	Title	Writer(s)	Length
15.	"No Lies" (2017 version)	The Kelly Family	2:56
16.	"Because It's Love" (2017 version)	The Kelly Family	3:32
17.	"Miracles"	Kuba Kubin; Norbert Peticzky	3:56
18.	"Baby Smile" (2017 version with Barby Kelly)	The Kelly Family	3:23
19.	"An Angel" (2017 version)	The Kelly Family	3:55

== Charts ==
=== Weekly charts ===
Chart (2017)	Peak position
Austrian Albums (Ö3 Austria)	1
Belgian Albums (Ultratop Flanders)	34
Czech Albums (ČNS IFPI)	59
Dutch Albums (Album Top 100)	18
German Albums (Offizielle Top 100)	1
Polish Albums (ZPAV)	10
Swiss Albums (Schweizer Hitparade)	3

=== Year-end charts ===
Chart (2017)	Position
Austrian Albums (Ö3 Austria)	11
Belgian Albums (Ultratop Flanders)	199
German Albums (Offizielle Top 100)	5
Swiss Albums (Schweizer Hitparade)	24

Chart (2018)	Position
Austrian Albums (Ö3 Austria)	53
German Albums (Offizielle Top 100)	14
Swiss Albums (Schweizer Hitparade)	43

=== Decade-end charts ===
Chart (2010–2019)	Position
Germany (Official German Charts)	45

== Certifications ==
Certifications for We Got Love
Region	Certification	Certified units/sales
Austria (IFPI Austria)	Gold	7,500^{‡}
Germany (BVMI)	5× Gold	500,000^{‡}
Switzerland (IFPI Switzerland)	Gold	10,000^{‡}
^{‡} Sales+streaming figures based on certification alone.
