= The Kelly Family (album) =

Studio album by The Kelly Family
- Released: March 5, 1979
- Recorded: 1978–1979
- Studio: Polydor Studio (Hamburg, Germany)
- Genre: Folk
- Length: 38:14
- Label: Polydor
- Producer: Jürgen Kramer, Peter Schirmann

The Kelly Family studio album chronology
Familia Kelly Canta la Navidad (1978)	The Kelly Family (1979)	Lieder der Welt (1979)

Singles from The Kelly Family
- 1. "Danny Boy/Agur Jaunak" Released: fall-1978

The Kelly Family is the third studio album by Euro-American folk band The Kelly Family, released on March 5, 1979, through Polydor.

This was the first album released by the label for the band. This was also the first album to be released on shops by the band, and also the first where the band had professional recordings.

== Informations ==
=== Background ===
The Kelly Family was formed in 1974, initially as a hobby by the older siblings, Caroline, Kathy, Paul and John, and one of their cousins, Maribel, when they lived in Spain. They mainly played at other children's parties or in the streets. Popularity began to grow and the hobby became more serious, as Dan and Barbara Kelly joined their sons on the stage.

Dan Kelly opened a bar in 1974 called La Vida where the band and others could play, but eventually closed it after the bar became too popular for the freedom of their children.

In 1975, the family started to tour in Europe, without Maribel. So Patricia learned to play the guitar in two weeks (thanks to Caroline) and she joined the band, aged only 6.

In 1976, while Papa Dan was showing Rome to his children, all of their money was stolen in their double-decker bus, leaving only their passports and their instruments.

After that, the Kellys continued to play in the streets, in order to finish the return trip. They also released two albums without professional recordings in 1977 and in 1978. By this time, also Jimmy and Joey had joined the band.

At mid-1978, the label Polydor offered them a contract, which Papa Dan accepted. The family then moved to Germany and lived in a camp, in order to record songs in Polydor's studios in Hamburg.

Their first recordings were for the songs Danny Boy and Agur Jaunak, which were both released as a Double A-side single in 1978.

=== The album ===
Ten Kellys took part in the album: Dan, Barbara, Caroline, Kathy, Paul, John, Patricia, Jimmy, Joey and Barby. The older child, Danny, did not take part because of a disability, but he briefly took part in home music. Though they were present on this album, Barbara, Paul and Barby have no lead vocals here.

Many of the tracks from this album were also recorded and released in 1977 in their first album, Kelly Family Tours Europe.

All the tracks were produced by Jürgen Kramer and Peter Schirmann and arranged by Schirmann and Dan Kelly.

This album features traditional tracks or cover of famous songs. Five of them are English, four Spanish, two in Basque and one German.

The first song recorded for this album was Danny Boy.

== Track listing ==
No.	Title	Length
1.	"Estudiantina Portuguesa" (Lead vocals: Kathy, Caroline, John, Patricia)	2:13
2.	"Peces en el Rio" (Lead vocals: Kathy, Caroline, Jimmy, John, Patricia, Joey)	3:13
3.	"Minstrel Boy" (Lead vocals: John)	3:12
4.	"Greensleeves" (Lead vocals: Dan, Kathy)	4:50
5.	"Cintas de Mi Capa" (Lead vocals: none)	2:23
6.	"Boga Boga" (Lead vocals: none)	3:03
7.	"Danny Boy" (Lead vocals: John, Dan)	3:53
8.	"Bendemeer's Stream" (Lead vocals: John)	3:42
9.	"Agur Jaunak" (Lead vocals: Dan)	4:03
10.	"Clavelitos" (Lead vocals: John, Patricia)	2:22
11.	"Rose of Tralee" (Lead vocals: Dan)	2:25
12.	"Muß Ich denn zum Städtele Hinaus" (Lead vocals: John)	2:55
Total length:		38:14

== Personnel ==
=== The Kelly Family ===
- Dan "Papa" Kelly – lead vocals (Tracks 4, 7, 9 and 11), vocals, bombo, percussions
- Barbara "Mama" Kelly – vocals
- Caroline Kelly – lead vocals (Tracks 1–2) vocals, accordion
- Kathy Kelly – lead vocals (Tracks 1–2 and 4), vocals, violin, guitar
- Paul Kelly – vocals, saxophone, violin, flute
- John Kelly – lead vocals (Tracks 1–3, 7–8, 10 and 12), vocals, bombo, percussions
- Patricia Kelly – lead vocals (Tracks 1–2 and 10), vocals, guitar
- Jimmy Kelly – lead vocals, vocals, percussions
- Joey Kelly – lead vocals, vocals, triangle
- Barby Kelly – vocals
