= Almost Heaven =

Studio album by The Kelly Family
- Released: October 25, 1996
- Recorded: 1996
- Studios: Sound Studio N (Cologne, Germany); Capri Digital Studio (Capri, Italy)
- Genres: Pop; pop rock; folk
- Length: 48:35
- Label: Kel-Life
- Producers: Kathy Kelly; Paddy Kelly

The Kelly Family chronology
Christmas for All (1995)	Almost Heaven (1996)	Growin' Up (1997)

Almost Heaven is the tenth regular studio album by European-American pop group The Kelly Family. Based on a concept by Dan Kelly, it was co-produced by Kathy and Paddy Kelly and released in 1996 throughout most of Europe. Following the major success of previous albums Over the Hump and Christmas for All and the number-one single "I Can't Help Myself", the album debuted at number one in Austria, Germany and Switzerland. It also entered the top 5 in the Netherlands and Norway and made it to the top 20 in Belgium. Almost Heaven eventually sold more than three million copies worldwide, making it the band's second biggest-selling release to date.

== Track listing ==
No.	Title	Writer(s)	Producer(s)	Length
1.	"When the Boys Come into Town" (lead vocals: John, Kathy, Maite)	The Kelly Family	Paddy Kelly; Kathy Kelly	3:15
2.	"Every Baby" (lead vocals: Maite)	The Kelly Family	Paddy Kelly; Kathy Kelly	2:56
3.	"I Can't Help Myself" (lead vocals: Angelo, Paddy)	The Kelly Family	Paddy Kelly; Kathy Kelly	3:03
4.	"Nanana" (lead vocals: Jimmy,)	The Kelly Family	Paddy Kelly; Kathy Kelly	4:03
5.	"You Belong to Me" (lead vocals: Patricia, Paddy)	The Kelly Family	Paddy Kelly; Kathy Kelly	3:15
6.	"Staying Alive" (lead vocals: Joey Kelly)	The Kelly Family	Paddy Kelly; Kathy Kelly	3:35
7.	"Come Back to Me" (lead vocals: Kathy)	The Kelly Family	Paddy Kelly; Kathy Kelly	3:49
8.	"Fell in Love with an Alien" (lead vocals: Paddy, Kathy)	The Kelly Family	Paddy Kelly; Kathy Kelly	3:11
9.	"Hey Diddle Diddle" (lead vocals: Paddy, Maite, Angelo, Barby)	The Kelly Family	Paddy Kelly; Kathy Kelly	2:43
10.	"Like a Queen" (lead vocals: Barby)	The Kelly Family	Paddy Kelly; Kathy Kelly	2:54
11.	"Stars Fall From Heaven" (lead vocals: Patricia, Maite)	The Kelly Family	Paddy Kelly; Kathy Kelly	3:23
12.	"Thunder" (lead vocals: Jimmy)	The Kelly Family	Paddy Kelly; Kathy Kelly	3:45
13.	"Calling Heaven" (lead vocals: Paddy)	The Kelly Family	Paddy Kelly; Kathy Kelly	3:25
14.	"Nothing like Home" (lead vocals: Kathy,)	The Kelly Family	Paddy Kelly; Kathy Kelly	3:42

== Personnel ==
Credits are taken from the album's liner notes.

Instruments and performances

- Johan Daansen – mouth harp
- Angelo Kelly – drums, percussion, washboard, timbales, vocals
- Barby Kelly – vocals, electric guitar, akustic guitar, perkussions, conga, piano, bongo
- Jimmy Kelly – acoustic guitar, electric-zither, spoons, vocals
- Joey Kelly – acoustic guitars, electric guitars, vocals
- John Kelly – acoustic guitars, electric guitar, percussions, vocals
- Kathy Kelly – accordion, keyboards, hammond, organ, piano, violin, vocals
- Maite Kelly – percussions, bass, vocals
- Patricia Kelly – harp, vocals
- Paddy Kelly – banjo, bass, guitars, keyboards, mandolin, tabla, percussions

Technical and production

- Album concept: Dan Kelly
- Writing: The Kelly Family
- Recording: Jan Shurman
- Mastering: Georgi Nedelschev, Dieter Wegner
- Mixing: Günther Kasper, G. Nedelschev, Kathy Kelly, Paddy Kelly, Max Volume
- Engineers: Günther "Mr. Cool" Kasper, Max Carola, Max Volume, Jürgen Lusky
- Engineering assistance: Alessandro Benedetti
- Photography: Thomas Stachelhaus
- Styling: Uschi Ries
- Litho: RGI Dortmund Germany

== Charts ==
=== Weekly charts ===
Chart (1996)	Peak position
Austrian Albums (Ö3 Austria)	1
Dutch Albums (Album Top 100)	3
Belgian Albums (Ultratop Flanders)	19
German Albums (Offizielle Top 100)	1
Hungarian Albums (MAHASZ)	1
Norwegian Albums (VG-lista)	2
Spanish Albums (Promusicae)	32
Swiss Albums (Schweizer Hitparade)	1

=== Year-end charts ===
Chart (1996)	Position
Austrian Albums (Ö3 Austria)	25
Dutch Albums (Album Top 100)	58
German Albums (Offizielle Top 100)	24
Chart (1997)	Position
Austrian Albums (Ö3 Austria)	43
Belgian Albums (Ultratop Flanders)	67
Dutch Albums (Album Top 100)	16
German Albums (Offizielle Top 100)	34

== Certifications ==
Region	Certification	Certified units/sales
Austria (IFPI Austria)	2× Platinum	100,000^{*}
France (SNEP)	Gold	100,000^{*}
Germany (BVMI)	2× Platinum	1,000,000^{^}
Netherlands (NVPI)	Platinum	100,000^{^}
Norway (IFPI Norway)	Platinum	50,000^{*}
Poland (ZPAV)	2× Platinum	200,000^{*}
Spain (Promusicae)	Platinum	100,000^{^}
Switzerland (IFPI Switzerland)	2× Platinum	100,000^{^}
^{*} Sales figures based on certification alone.^{^} Shipments figures based on certification alone.
