= I Will Be Your Bride =

Single by The Kelly Family

from the album From Their Hearts
- Genre: Pop
- Length: 4:22
- Songwriter: Angelo Kelly
- Producers: Kathy, Paddy and Angelo Kelly

"I Will Be Your Bride" is a song by European-American pop group The Kelly Family and was written by Angelo Kelly. It was produced by Kathy, Paddy and Angelo Kelly as the lead single for their twelfth studio album From Their Hearts and features lead vocals by Angelo Kelly.

The single also includes live versions of the songs "One More Freaking Dollar" (sung by Paddy Kelly) and "First Time" (sung by Patricia Kelly).

== Formats and track listings ==
Maxi single

1. I Will Be Your Bride (4:22)

2. One More Freakin' Dollar (live version) (3:49)

3. First Time (live version) (3:34)

== Charts ==
Chart (1997)	Peak position
Austria (Ö3 Austria Top 40)	14
Germany (GfK)	14
Switzerland (Schweizer Hitparade)	19
Netherlands (Single Top 100)	17
