= Wonderful World! (The Kelly Family album) =

Studio album by The Kelly Family
- Released: 1981
- Recorded: 1980/1981 (Frans Peter's Hilversum, Netherlands)
- Genres: Pop, pop rock, folk
- Length: 37:38
- Label: Kel-Life
- Producer: Dan Kelly

The Kelly Family chronology
Christmas All Year (1981)	Wonderful World! (1981)	Une Famille c'est une Chanson (1984)

Wonderful World! is a 1981 album by The Kelly Family. The album includes traditional Virginia melodies such as the "New Britain" melody to "Amazing Grace", published in the 1831 collection Virginia Harmony.

== Information ==
After Lieder der Welt, the Kellys' label, Polydor, offered Dan "Papa" Kelly a solo contract for his star, young John Kelly, which was promptly refused by Papa Kelly. The Kelly Family's contract with Polydor expired in 1980, which Papa Kelly was glad for as he wanted his children to feel free. He then started his personal label, KEL-Life.

Production began for two albums, Wonderful World! and Christmas for All. Caroline left the band (and soon the family too) in 1980 after the recordings of Kelly Family Loves Christmas and You, though she very briefly took part in the early recordings of Wonderful World!.

Nine members took part in the album; Papa and Mama Kelly and siblings Kathy, Paul, John, Patricia, Jimmy, Joey and Barby. This is the first album where Barby has lead vocals and the last where Mama Kelly took part, as she'll die of breast cancer in 1982. The family immediately moved to Spain after finishing producing the album.

All the songs were arranged by Kathy Kelly and Willeem Poot and two of them ("Txiki" and "Lonely") are credited as written by Kathy.

Video clips were made in Germany, Italy and in Spain featuring all members, Paddy and Maite, but without Caroline (with the exception of "Ave Maria" where also Angelo is present). Many of them were released on A Long Time Ago with Mom, and others on The Complete Story and Christmas for All.

There are two versions known of the track "What a Wonderful World". The first is the official version from 1981 with John and Joey on the lead vocals and the 1984 version with Paddy and Joey, released on another version of the album. The 1984 version is one of the five songs known from the Eric Barclay era (along with "Une Famille c'est une Chanson", "Didelidei", "Ein Familie ist Ein Wield" and "Hiroshima, I'm Sorry").

Two Double-A singles were released from this album: the first is "Old McDonald" / "Amazing Grace" released in 1984 and the other "We Love the Pope" / "Our Father" in 1986.

== Track listing ==
Wonderful World! – regular version
No.	Title	Length
1.	"All My Trials, Lord" (Lead vocals: Papa, Kathy, Mama)	5:06
2.	"Txiki"	3:16
3.	"We Love the Pope" (Lead vocals: Papa, John)	3:25
4.	"You'll Never Walk Alone" (Lead vocals: John, Papa)	2:24
5.	"Old McDonald" (Lead vocals: Patricia, John, Jimmy, Joey, Kathy, Paul, Barby)	2:30
6.	"Our Father" (Lead vocals: John, Papa)	2:22
7.	"Amazing Grace" (Lead vocals: Papa, Patricia, Kathy, John)	3:32
8.	"Lonely" (Lead vocals: John, Papa)	3:13
9.	"What a Wonderful World" (Lead vocals: Joey, John)	2:16
10.	"Shortnin' Bread" (Lead vocals: Papa, Patricia, Jimmy, Joey, Paul)	2:16
11.	"Ave Maria" (Lead vocals: John, Papa)	4:09
12.	"Ode to Joy" (Lead vocals: John)	3:13
Total length:		37:38

Multimedia bonus track
No.	Title	Length
13.	"Memories" (Lead vocals: Patricia, Kathy, Dan)	5:30
Total length:		43:08

== Personnel ==
=== The Kelly Family ===
- Dan "Papa" Kelly – lead vocals (Tracks 1, 3–4, 6–8, 10–11, 13), producer
- Barbara-Ann "Mama" Kelly – lead vocals (Track 1)
- Caroline Kelly – background vocals (Track 3), accordion
- Kathy Kelly – lead vocals (Tracks 1, 5, 7, 13), violin, accordion, guitar, arrangements
- Paul Kelly – lead vocals (Tracks 5, 10), violin, flute, saxophone
- John Kelly – lead vocals (Tracks 3–9, 11–12), bombo, percussions
- Patricia Kelly – lead vocals (Tracks 5, 7, 10, 13), guitar
- Jimmy Kelly – lead vocals (Tracks 5, 10)
- Joey Kelly – lead vocals (Tracks 5, 9–10)
- Barby Kelly – lead vocals (Track 5)
