= When the Boys Come into Town =

Single by The Kelly Family

from the album Almost Heaven
- Released: 1997
- Recorded: 1996
- Genre: Pop; folk; latin
- Length: 3:15
- Label: KEL-Life
- Songwriter(s): The Kelly Family
- Producer(s): Kathy Kelly; Paddy Kelly

The Kelly Family singles chronology
"Nanana" (1997)	"When the Boys Come into Town" (1997)	"Because It's Love" (1997)

"When the Boys Come into Town" is a song by European-American pop group The Kelly Family. It was produced by Kathy and Paddy Kelly for their ninth studio album Almost Heaven (1996) and features lead vocals by John, Kathy and Maite Kelly. The song served as the last single from the album.

== Track listings ==
Maxi single
No.	Title	Length
1.	"When the Boys Come into Town"	3:15
2.	"It's OK Now"	3:25

== Charts ==
Chart (1997)	Peak position
Austria (Ö3 Austria Top 40)	29
Germany (GfK)	37
Switzerland (Schweizer Hitparade)	32
