= Roses of Red =

1995 single by the Kelly Family

Single by the Kelly Family

from the album Over the Hump
- Released: 1995
- Length: 3:46
- Label: KEL-Life
- Songwriter(s): The Kelly Family
- Producer(s): Kathy Kelly; Hartmut Pfannmüller

The Kelly Family singles chronology
"Why Why Why" (1995)	"Roses of Red" (1995)	"First Time" (1995)

"Roses of Red" is a song by European-American pop music group the Kelly Family. Written and lead sung by band member Maite Kelly, it was produced by her sister Kathy Kelly and Hartmut Pfannmüller for their eighth regular studio album, Over the Hump (1994). The song was released as the album's third single. The song reached the top 20 of the German Singles Chart.

== Track listings ==
Maxi single
No.	Title	Length
1.	"Roses of Red" (Single-Remix)	3:51
2.	"The Wolf"	3:25
3.	"Roses of Red" (Groove-Mix)	3:51

== Credits and personnel ==
Credits adapted from the liner notes of Over the Hump.

- Songwriting – The Kelly Family
- Production – Hartmut Pfannmüller, Kathy Kelly
- Executive production – Dan Kelly, Mike Ungefehr
- Engineering – Günther Kasper

== Charts ==
=== Weekly charts ===
Chart (1995)	Peak Position
Germany (GfK)	15
Switzerland (Schweizer Hitparade)	21

=== Year-end charts ===
Chart (1995)	Position
Germany (Media Control)	67
