= One More Song (song) =

Single by The Kelly Family

from the album Growin' Up
- Released: 1998
- Recorded: 1997
- Genre: Pop; folk
- Length: 4:20
- Label: KEL-Life
- Songwriter: The Kelly Family
- Producers: Kathy Kelly; Paddy Kelly

The Kelly Family singles chronology
"Red Shoes" (1997)	"One More Song" (1998)	"I Will Be Your Bride" (1998)

"One More Song" is a song by European-American pop group The Kelly Family and was written by Paddy Kelly. It was produced by Kathy and Paddy Kelly for their eleventh studio album Growin' Up (1997) and features lead vocals by Paddy Kelly. The song served as the second album's single. The single includes two bonus tracks. First the song "Say That You Love Me", written and sung by Maite Kelly. The song was released later on the album The Bonus-Tracks Album in 1999. And second the song "Leave It to the Spirits", written and sung by Barby and Jimmy Kelly.

== Track listings ==
Maxi single
No.	Title	Length
1.	"One More Song"	4:20
2.	"Say That You Love Me"	3:57
3.	"Leave It to the Spirits"	2:56

== Charts ==
Chart (1998)	Peak position
Austria (Ö3 Austria Top 40)	23
Germany (GfK)	19
Netherlands (Single Top 100)	37
Switzerland (Schweizer Hitparade)	32
