= Every Baby =

Single by The Kelly Family

from the album Almost Heaven
- Released: 1996
- Recorded: 1996
- Genre: Pop; folk
- Length: 2:56
- Label: KEL-Life
- Songwriter: The Kelly Family
- Producers: Kathy Kelly; Paddy Kelly

The Kelly Family singles chronology
"I Can't Help Myself" (1996)	"Every Baby" (1996)	"Gott Deine Kinder" (1996)

"Every Baby" is a song by European-American pop group The Kelly Family. It was produced by Kathy Kelly and Paddy Kelly for their ninth studio album Almost Heaven (1996) and features lead vocals by Maite Kelly. Released as the album's second single, the ballad reached the top five of the Swiss Singles Chart.

== Formats and track listings ==
Maxi single
No.	Title	Length
1.	"Every Baby"	2:56
2.	"Fat Man"	3:12
3.	"Like a Queen"	2:45

== Credits and personnel ==
Credits adapted from the liner notes of Almost Heaven.

- Songwriting – The Kelly Family
- Production – Kathy Kelly, Paddy Kelly
- Executive production – Dan Kelly, Mike Ungefehr
- Engineering, mixing – Günther Kasper, Max Carola
- Mixing assistance – Georgi Nedeltschev, Kathy Kelly, Paddy Kelly
- Mastering – Dieter Wegner, Georgi Nedeltschev

== Charts ==
Chart (1996)	Peak position
Austria (Ö3 Austria Top 40)	9
Germany (GfK)	13
Hungary (Mahasz)	9
Netherlands (Single Top 100)	75
Norway (VG-lista)	18
Switzerland (Schweizer Hitparade)	5
