= Growin' Up (The Kelly Family album) =

Studio album by The Kelly Family
- Released: November 3, 1997
- Recorded: 1997
- Studio: Sound Studio N (Cologne, Germany); Rinn Ronain Hotel Cobh (Cork, Ireland); Capri Digital Studio (Capri, Italy)
- Genre: Pop; pop rock; folk
- Length: 46:42
- Label: Kel-Life
- Producer: Kathy Kelly; Paddy Kelly

The Kelly Family chronology
Almost Heaven (1996)	Growin' Up (1997)	Live Live Live (1998)

Growin' Up is the eleventh regular studio album by European-American pop group The Kelly Family. Based on concept by Dan Kelly, it was co-produced by Kathy and Paddy Kelly and released in 1997 throughout most of Europe.

== Track listing ==
No.	Title	Writer(s)	Producer(s)	Length
1.	"Because It's Love" (lead vocals: Angelo, Paddy)	The Kelly Family	Paddy Kelly; Kathy Kelly	3:43
2.	"Angels Flying" (lead vocals: Joey)	The Kelly Family	Paddy Kelly; Kathy Kelly	4:00
3.	"I'll Swim I'll Swim" (lead vocals: Paddy, Angelo)	The Kelly Family	Paddy Kelly; Kathy Kelly	3:11
4.	"Life Is Hard Enough" (lead vocals: Patricia)	The Kelly Family	Paddy Kelly; Kathy Kelly	3:40
5.	"Wish I Were a Swallow" (lead vocals: Maite, Kathy)	The Kelly Family	Paddy Kelly; Kathy Kelly	3:19
6.	"Ego" (lead vocals: Jimmy, Paddy, Joey, John)	The Kelly Family	Paddy Kelly; Kathy Kelly	2:50
7.	"One More Song" (lead vocals: Paddy)	The Kelly Family	Paddy Kelly; Kathy Kelly	4:20
8.	"Rock'n' Roll Stole My Soul" (lead vocals: Paddy, Kathy)	The Kelly Family	Paddy Kelly; Kathy Kelly	4:09
9.	"Red Shoes" (lead vocals: John)	The Kelly Family	Paddy Kelly; Kathy Kelly	4:12
10.	"Leave It to the Spirits" (lead vocals: Barby, Jimmy)	The Kelly Family	Paddy Kelly; Kathy Kelly	2:56
11.	"Big Mouth on TV" (lead vocals: Paddy)	The Kelly Family	Paddy Kelly; Kathy Kelly	2:36
12.	"Another World" (lead vocals: Joey)	The Kelly Family	Paddy Kelly; Kathy Kelly	3:59
13.	"All Along the Way (I Will Be with You)" (lead vocals: Kathy, Jimmy)	The Kelly Family	Paddy Kelly; Kathy Kelly	4:33

== Personnel ==
Credits are taken from the album's liner notes.

Instruments and performances

- Johann Daansen – flute, piano
- Angelo Kelly – bongos, drums, shaker, tambourine, timbales, vocals
- Barby Kelly – congas, shaker, tambourine, vocals, akustická gitara
- Jimmy Kelly – electric guitar, vocals
- Joey Kelly – acoustic guitar, electric guitar, 12-string, vocals
- John Kelly – acoustic guitar, maracas, mandolin, tremolo guitar, vocals
- Kathy Kelly – accordion, Hammond, keyboard, organ, vocals
- Maite Kelly – bass, congas, shaker, vocals
- Patricia Kelly – hammond organ, harp, keyboard, vocals
- Paddy Kelly – acoustic guitar, bass, e-bow guitar, electric guitar, keyboard, piano, 12-string, vocals
- Munich Philharmonic Orchestra – various
- Kristian Schulze – conduction

Technical and production

- Album concept: Dan Kelly
- Mastering: Georgi Nedelschev, Dieter Wegner
- Mixing engineers: Günther Kasper, Thomas Brück, Hartmur Pfannmüller, Max Volume, Stuart Bruce, Jürgen Lusky
- Recording engineers: Chris Brown, Stuart Bruce, Thomas Brück, Steve Bush, Massimo Carola, Renny Hill, Günther Kasper, Jürgen Lusky, Max Volume
- Assistant engineers: Alessandro Benedetti, Pat Grogan, Nick Friend, Tobias Nievelstein, Richard Rainey, Nico Schütte, Graham Stewart
- Cover design: Heidi Mösl, Dan Kelly, Thomas Stachelhaus
- Photography: Thomas Stachelhaus
- Styling: Uschi Ries
- Litho: RGI Dortmund, Germany

== Charts ==
=== Weekly charts ===
Chart (1997)	Peak position
Austrian Albums (Ö3 Austria)	5
Dutch Albums (Album Top 100)	4
Belgian Albums (Ultratop Flanders)	10
German Albums (Offizielle Top 100)	1
Hungarian Albums (MAHASZ)	3
Norwegian Albums (VG-lista)	27
Swedish Albums (Sverigetopplistan)	59
Swiss Albums (Schweizer Hitparade)	3

=== Year-end charts ===
Chart (1997)	Position
German Albums (Offizielle Top 100)	57

== Certifications ==
Region	Certification	Certified units/sales
Belgium (BRMA)	Gold	25,000^{*}
Poland (ZPAV)	Gold	50,000^{*}
^{*} Sales figures based on certification alone.
