= An Angel =

1994 single by the Kelly Family

Single by the Kelly Family

from the album Over the Hump
- Released: June 28, 1994
- Length: 3:44
- Label: Kel-Life
- Songwriter: The Kelly Family
- Producers: Kathy Kelly; Hartmut Pfannmüller

The Kelly Family singles chronology
"One More Freakin' Dollar" (1993)	"An Angel" (1994)	"Why Why Why" (1995)

"An Angel" is a song by European-American pop group the Kelly Family. It was produced by Kathy Kelly and Hartmut Pfannmüller for their eighth regular studio album, Over the Hump (1994), and features lead vocals by Angelo and Paddy Kelly. Paddy wrote the song for his mother, Barbara Kelly, who died in 1982 from breast cancer. He wrote it on the family's boat, Santa Barbara. In 2017, the Kelly Family re-recorded the song for their We Got Love album.

== Track listings ==
CD maxi single
No.	Title	Length
1.	"An Angel"	3:45
2.	"Break Free"	2:38

== Personnel ==
Personnel are adapted from the liner notes of Over the Hump.

- Songwriting – the Kelly Family
- Production – Hartmut Pfannmüller, Kathy Kelly
- Executive production – Dan Kelly, Mike Ungefehr
- Engineering – Günther Kasper

== Charts ==
=== Weekly charts ===
Weekly chart performance for "An Angel"
Chart (1994–1995)	Peak position
Austria (Ö3 Austria Top 40)	1
Europe (Eurochart Hot 100)	8
Germany (GfK)	2
Iceland (Íslenski Listinn Topp 40)	22
Ireland (IRMA)	5
Netherlands (Single Top 100)	40
Switzerland (Schweizer Hitparade)	2
UK Singles (Official Charts)	69

=== Year-end charts ===
1994 year-end chart performance for "An Angel"
Chart (1994)	Position
Germany (Media Control)	45

1995 year-end chart performance for "An Angel"
Chart (1995)	Position
Austria (Ö3 Austria Top 40)	9
Europe (Eurochart Hot 100)	71
Germany (Media Control)	43
Switzerland (Schweizer Hitparade)	27

=== Decade-end charts ===
Chart (1990–1999)	Rank
Austria (Ö3 Austria Top 40)	79

== Certifications ==
Certifications for "An Angel"
Region	Certification	Certified units/sales
Austria (IFPI Austria)	Platinum	50,000^{*}
Germany (BVMI)	3× Gold	800,000
Poland (ZPAV)	Platinum	50,000^{‡}
^{*} Sales figures based on certification alone.^{‡} Sales+streaming figures based on certification alone.

== Other versions ==
- In 2006, the song was also covered by English singer Declan Galbraith and served as the first single and opening track from his second album Thank You (2006).
- Gregor Meyle for his album Meylensteine Vol 1 (2015).
- Silbermond lead singer Stefanie Kloß for the compilation album Sing meinen Song – Das Tauschkonzert Vol 4 (2017)
- In 2023, American singer Anastacia recorded a version of "An Angel" for her album Our Songs.
