= Homerun (The Kelly Family album) =

Studio album by The Kelly Family
- Released: June 7, 2004
- Recorded: Conny's Studio (Cologne)
- Genre: Pop; Rock; folk
- Length: 70:40
- Label: Polydor
- Producer: Kelbros

The Kelly Family chronology
| La Patata (2002) | Homerun (2004) | Hope (2005) |

Professional ratings
Review scores
| Source | Rating |
|---|---|
| laut.de | 3/5 stars |

Homerun is the fourteenth regular studio album by the European-American pop group The Kelly Family, released by Polydor in 2004 throughout most of Europe. The first disc has only acoustic songs while the songs on the second disc include drums and electric guitars. In 2004 and 2005 The Kelly Family toured Germany to promote the album.

== Track listing ==
=== Disc one ===
1. "I'll Be There" – 4:16
2. "Walking" – 3:49
3. "Strange World" – 3:39
4. "What If Love" – 4:06
5. "Don't Always Want" – 3:46
6. "Intermission: Mother Teresa" – 0:13
7. "Carry My Soul" – 3:43
8. "Break the Walls" – 3:52
9. "Burning Fire" – 5:18
10. "Don't Be So Unhappy" – 4:31

=== Disc two ===
1. "Babylon" – 4:06
2. "Everybody Is Beautiful" – 4:07
3. "Streets of Love" – 3:23
4. "Street Kid (Gucci Shit)" – 3:27
5. "Intermission: China Keitetsi" – 0:34
6. "Blood" – 3:51
7. "I Wish the Very Best" – 4:35
8. "Flip a Coin" – 4:30
9. "Edge of Happiness" – 4:54

== Personnel ==
=== Musicians ===
- Wilhelm Geschwind – bass, fretless bass, piccolo-double bass.
- Axel Hilgenstoehler – Wurlitzer electric piano, guitar, sound treatment.
- Angelo Kelly – vocals, drums, percussion, guitars, keyboards, piano, Hammond organ, xylophone.
- Jimmy Kelly – vocals, piano, Wurlitzer electric piano, Hammond organ, guitars, percussion.
- Joey Kelly – vocals, acoustic guitar, electric guitar, percussion.
- Maite Kelly – vocals, acoustic guitar, Wurlitzer electric piano, percussion.
- Paddy Kelly– vocals, guitars, piano, keyboards, mandolin, Wurlitzer electric piano, Rhodes piano, Hammond organ, percussion.
- Patricia Kelly – vocals, piano, acoustic guitar, percussion.
- Paul Kelly – hurdy-gurdy.
- Peter Materna – saxophone.
- Ölberger Kinderchor – vocals.
- Marc Weis – sound treatment.

=== Production ===
- Writing: The Kelly Family
- Recording: Britta Kühlmann
- Mastering: Bob Ludwig
- Mixing: Richard Rainey
  - Mixing assistance: Flo Beir
- Engineers: Britta Kühlmann
  - Engineering assistance: Marc Weis
- Photography: Thomas Stachelhaus
- Artwork: Heidi Mösl
- Litho: RGI Dortmund Germany

== Charts ==
| Chart (2004) | Peak position |
|---|---|
| Austrian Albums (Ö3 Austria) | 52 |
| Dutch Albums (Album Top 100) | 36 |
| German Albums (Offizielle Top 100) | 9 |
