= Nanana (The Kelly Family song) =

Single by The Kelly Family

from the album Almost Heaven
- Released: 1997
- Recorded: 1996
- Genre: Pop; folk
- Length: 4:03
- Label: KEL-Life
- Songwriter(s): The Kelly Family
- Producer(s): Kathy Kelly; Paddy Kelly

The Kelly Family singles chronology
"Fell in Love with an Alien" (1997)	"Nanana" (1997)	"When the Boys Come into Town" (1997)

"Nanana" is a song by European-American pop group The Kelly Family. It was produced by Kathy and Paddy Kelly for their ninth studio album Almost Heaven (1996) and features lead vocals by Jimmy Kelly. The song reached the top ten of the Swiss Singles Chart and peaked at number 17 in Germany. In support of their comeback compilation album We Got Love (2007), "Na Na Na" was re-released as a single in March 2017, this time again with Jimmy on the lead vocals.

== Track listings ==
Maxi single
No.	Title	Length
1.	"Nanana"	4:03
2.	"I'm So Happy"	2:48
3.	"Staying Alive"	2:56

== Charts ==
Chart (1996)	Peak position
Austria (Ö3 Austria Top 40)	23
Germany (GfK)	17
Switzerland (Schweizer Hitparade)	6
