= Because It's Love =

1997 single by the Kelly Family

Single by the Kelly Family

from the album Growin' Up
- Released: 1997
- Length: 3:43
- Label: KEL-Life
- Songwriter(s): The Kelly Family
- Producer(s): Kathy Kelly; Paddy Kelly

The Kelly Family singles chronology
"When the Boys Come into Town" (1997)	"Because It's Love" (1997)	"Red Shoes" (1997)

"Because It's Love" is a song by European-American pop group the Kelly Family. It was produced by Kathy and Paddy Kelly as the lead single for their 11th studio album Growin' Up (1997) and features lead vocals by Angelo and Paddy. The CD single contains an edited version of "Sweetest Angel" sung by Barby Kelly, which was also appears on the Kelly Family's next album, From their Hearts (1998).

== Track listings ==
Maxi single
No.	Title	Length
1.	"Because It's Love"	3:42
2.	"Sweetest Angel"	3:36
3.	"I'll Send You a Letter"	2:46

== Charts ==
=== Weekly charts ===
Chart (1997)	Peak position
Austria (Ö3 Austria Top 40)	2
Belgium (Ultratip Bubbling Under Flanders)	11
Germany (GfK)	3
Netherlands (Dutch Top 40)	6
Netherlands (Single Top 100)	13
Switzerland (Schweizer Hitparade)	2

=== Year-end charts ===
Chart (1997)	Position
Germany (Media Control)	90
Netherlands (Dutch Top 40)	60
Netherlands (Single Top 100)	66
