= Why Why Why (The Kelly Family song) =

Single by The Kelly Family

from the album Over the Hump
- Released: 1995
- Genre: Pop; rock
- Length: 3:33
- Label: Kel-Life
- Songwriter(s): The Kelly Family
- Producer(s): Kathy Kelly; Hartmut Pfannmüller

The Kelly Family singles chronology
"An Angel" (1994)	"Why Why Why" (1995)	"Roses of Red" (1995)

"Why Why Why" is a song by European-American pop group The Kelly Family. It was produced by Hartmut Pfannmüller and Kathy Kelly for their eighth regular studio album Over the Hump (1994) and features lead vocals by Joey and Paddy Kelly. Released as the album's second single, the song reached the top twenty of the Austrian Singles Chart. This song was also released as a promotional single in Italy after the band played it at the 1995 Festival di Sanremo as guest stars.

== Track listings ==
Maxi single
No.	Title	Length
1.	"Why Why Why"	3:33
2.	"We Are the World"	4:55
3.	"She's Crazy"	3:40

== Credits and personnel ==
Credits adapted from the liner notes of Over the Hump.

- Songwriting – The Kelly Family
- Production – Hartmut Pfannmüller, Kathy Kelly
- Executive production – Dan Kelly, Mike Ungefehr
- Engineering – Günther Kasper

== Charts ==
Chart (1995)	Peak Position
Austria (Ö3 Austria Top 40)	16
Germany (GfK)	26
Switzerland (Schweizer Hitparade)	34
