= La Patata =

Studio album by The Kelly Family
- Released: April 2002
- Recorded: 2001–2002
- Genre: Pop rock, pop, folk
- Length: 63:04
- Label: KEL-Life, Universal
- Producer: Kelbros

The Kelly Family chronology
Best of The Kelly Family 2 (1999)	La Patata (2002)	Homerun (2004)

Professional ratings
Review scores
Source	Rating
laut.de	link

La Patata is the thirteenth regular studio album by European-American pop group The Kelly Family, released by KEL-Life Records in April 2002 throughout most of Europe. It was the band's first new release since From Their Hearts in October 1998 and marked the departure of original band members Kathy and John Kelly. In 2002 and 2003 The Kelly Family toured Europe to promote the album.

== Track listing ==
La Patata – Standard edition
No.	Title	Length
1.	"What's a Matter You People"	4:18
2.	"Love, Music 'n' Sun"	3:40
3.	"New Morals (Human Race)"	4:09
4.	"Brother Brother"	4:44
5.	"Spinning Around"	4:25
6.	"Special Girl"	3:26
7.	"I Wanna Be Loved"	3:26
8.	"Oh God"	5:49
9.	"True Love"	3:34
10.	"So Many Troubles"	4:08
11.	"So Many Things"	3:34
12.	"No One But You"	4:11
13.	"Lord Can You Hear My Prayer"	4:23
14.	"Life Can Be So Beautiful"	3:30

Disc 1: La Patata — reissue edition
No.	Title	Length
1.	"What's a Matter You People"	4:18
2.	"Love, Music 'n' Sun"	3:40
3.	"New Morals (Human Race)"	4:09
4.	"Brother Brother"	4:44
5.	"Spinning Around"	4:25
6.	"Special Girl"	3:26
7.	"I Wanna Be Loved"	3:26
8.	"Mrs. Speechless"	3:46
9.	"Oh God"	5:49
10.	"True Love"	3:34
11.	"So Many Troubles"	4:08
12.	"So Many Things"	3:34
13.	"No One But You"	4:11
14.	"Lord Can You Hear My Prayer"	4:23
15.	"Life Can Be So Beautiful"	3:30

Disc 2: La Patata — reissue edition
No.	Title	Length
1.	"Making of "Mrs. Speechless""
2.	"Brother, Brother" (About the Song, Paddy's Comments)
3.	"What's Matter You People" (Music video)
4.	"I Wanna Be Loved" (Alternative music video)

== Charts ==
Chart (2002)	Peak position
Austrian Albums (Ö3 Austria)	35
Dutch Albums (Album Top 100)	16
Belgian Albums (Ultratop Flanders)	32
German Albums (Offizielle Top 100)	3
Hungarian Albums (MAHASZ)	31
Swiss Albums (Schweizer Hitparade)	63
