= 25 Years Later =

Studio album by The Kelly Family
- Released: 25 October 2019
- Length: 58:26
- Label: Airforce1; Universal Music
- Producer: Thorsten Brötzmann; Jeo Mezei; Elephant Music

The Kelly Family chronology
We Got Love (2017)	25 Years Later (2019)

25 Years Later is the sixteenth studio album by European-American pop group The Kelly Family. It was released by license to Airforce1 Records, a division of Universal Music, on 25 October 2019 throughout most of Central Europe.

== Track listing ==
All tracks produced by Thorsten Brötzmann, Jeo Mezei, and Elephant Music.

No.	Title	Writer(s)	Length
1.	"Over the Hump"	Angelo Kelly	3:47
2.	"Fire"	Patricia Kelly; Danny Shah; Sky Adams	3:10
3.	"El camino"	John Kelly; Maite Itoiz	3:42
4.	"Once in a While" (2019 version)	The Kelly Family	3:35
5.	"We Had a Dream"	Joey Kelly; Victor James Kelly	3:34
6.	"Star of the County Down" (with Paul Kelly)	Traditional	3:06
7.	"Baila mi corazon"	Kathy Kelly	3:20
8.	"Sweet Freedom"	Patricia Kelly; Jonas Myrin	3:57
9.	"Never Gonna Break Me Down" (2019 version)	The Kelly Family	4:42
10.	"Tears"	John Kelly; Maite Itoiz	4:26
11.	"If You Love Me"	Angelo Kelly	3:16
12.	"Father's Nose" (2019 version)	The Kelly Family	3:09
13.	"Take My Heart"	Victor James Kelly	3:20
14.	"Break Free" (2019 version with Barby Kelly)	The Kelly Family	2:56
15.	"Made of Gold"	Patricia Kelly; Justin Gray	4:11
16.	"Santa Maria" (2019 version)	The Kelly Family	3:52

== Charts ==
=== Weekly charts ===
Chart (2019)	Peak position
Austrian Albums (Ö3 Austria)	1
Belgian Albums (Ultratop Flanders)	26
Dutch Albums (Album Top 100)	40
German Albums (Offizielle Top 100)	1
Swiss Albums (Schweizer Hitparade)	2

=== Year-end charts ===
Chart (2019)	Position
Austrian Albums (Ö3 Austria)	70
German Albums (Official Top 100)	33
Swiss Albums (Schweizer Hitparade)	75
Chart (2020)	Position
German Albums (Official Top 100)	27
Swiss Albums (Schweizer Hitparade)	89

== Release history ==
Region	Date	Format	Label	Ref(s)
Various	25 October 2019	CD; digital download	Airforce1; Universal Music	
