= First Time (The Kelly Family song) =

Single by The Kelly Family

from the album Over the Hump
- Released: 1995
- Recorded: 1994
- Genre: Pop; folk
- Length: 4:14
- Label: KEL-Life
- Songwriter(s): The Kelly Family
- Producer(s): Kathy Kelly; Hartmut Pfannmüller

The Kelly Family singles chronology
"Roses of Red" (1995)	"First Time" (1995)	"I Can't Help Myself" (1996)

"First Time" is a song by European-American pop group The Kelly Family. It was produced by Kathy Kelly and Hartmut Pfannmüller for their eighth regular studio album Over the Hump (1994) and features lead vocals by Patricia Kelly who co-wrote the song. "First Time" was released as the album's fourth and final single in 1995.

== Track listings ==
CD maxi single
No.	Title	Length
1.	"First Time" (Remix)	4:12
2.	"Father's Nose"	3:18
3.	"First Time" (Live)	3:43

== Credits and personnel ==
Credits adapted from the liner notes of Over the Hump.

- Songwriting – The Kelly Family
- Production – Hartmut Pfannmüller, Kathy Kelly
- Executive production – Dan Kelly, Mike Ungefehr
- Engineering – Günther Kasper

== Charts ==
Chart (1995)	Peak Position
Austria (Ö3 Austria Top 40)	16
Germany (GfK)	19
Ireland (IRMA)	25
Switzerland (Schweizer Hitparade)	19
