= Over the Hump =

Studio album by The Kelly Family
- Released: 26 August 1994
- Recorded: 1994
- Studio: Sound Studio N (Cologne, Germany)
- Genre: Pop; pop rock; folk
- Length: 49:46
- Label: KEL-Life
- Producer: Dan Kelly; Mike Ungefehr (exec.); Kathy Kelly; Hartmut Pfannmüller

The Kelly Family chronology
The Very Best Over 10 Years (1993)	Over the Hump (1994)	Christmas for All (1995)

Over the Hump is the eighth regular studio album by European-American pop group The Kelly Family. Co-produced by Hartmut Müller and Kathy Kelly and recorded at the Sound Studio N in Cologne, it was released on 26 August 1994 throughout most of Europe. The album reached number-one in Austria, Germany and Switzerland, resulting in the group's breakthrough in German-speaking Europe after years of minor successful studio and live releases. It peaked at 17 in their native Ireland and also entered the top 30 in the Netherlands, Norway and Spain and sold more than 1.8 million copies within the first five months of its release.

Over the Hump eventually sold more than 2.25 million copies in Germany alone, making it one of the biggest-selling albums of German origin to date. It produced the band's first number-one hit single, "An Angel", and yielded three further top-twenty singles: "Why Why Why", "Roses of Red" and "First Time". In 2019, The Kelly Family produced the studio album 25 Years Later to commemorate the release of Over the Hump.

== Track listing ==
No.	Title	Writer(s)	Producer(s)	Length
1.	"Why Why Why" (lead vocals: Joey, Paddy)	The Kelly Family	Hartmut Pfannmüller; Kathy Kelly	3:33
2.	"Father's Nose" (lead vocals: Kathy)	The Kelly Family	Hartmut Pfannmüller; Kathy Kelly	3:18
3.	"First Time" (lead vocals: Patricia)	The Kelly Family	Hartmut Pfannmüller; Kathy Kelly	4:14
4.	"Baby Smile" (lead vocals: Barby)	The Kelly Family	Hartmut Pfannmüller; Kathy Kelly	3:36
5.	"Cover the Road" (lead vocals: Jimmy)	The Kelly Family	Hartmut Pfannmüller; Kathy Kelly	3:59
6.	"She's Crazy" (lead vocals: Barby)	The Kelly Family	Hartmut Pfannmüller; Kathy Kelly	3:40
7.	"Ares qui" (lead vocals: Paddy, Kathy, Jimmy)	The Kelly Family	Hartmut Pfannmüller; Kathy Kelly	3:49
8.	"Key to My Heart" (lead vocals: Paddy, Joey)	The Kelly Family	Hartmut Pfannmüller; Kathy Kelly; Dan Kelly	2:57
9.	"Roses of Red" (lead vocals: Maite)	The Kelly Family	Hartmut Pfannmüller; Kathy Kelly	3:46
10.	"Once in a While" (lead vocals: Angelo)	The Kelly Family	Hartmut Pfannmüller; Kathy Kelly	2:52
11.	"Break Free" (lead vocals: Barby)	The Kelly Family	Hartmut Pfannmüller; Kathy Kelly	2:37
12.	"An Angel" (lead vocals: Paddy, Angelo)	The Kelly Family	Hartmut Pfannmüller; Kathy Kelly	3:44
13.	"The Wolf" (lead vocals: Joey)	The Kelly Family	Hartmut Pfannmüller; Kathy Kelly	3:25
14.	"Santa Maria" (lead vocals: Johnny, Angelo)	The Kelly Family	Hartmut Pfannmüller; Kathy Kelly	3:07

== Personnel ==
Credits are taken from the album's liner notes.

Instruments and performances

- Johann Daansen – bass guitar, guitar, keyboards
- Angelo Kelly – vocals, drums
- Barby Kelly – vocals, guitar, perkusie, conga, tamburina

- Jimmy Kelly – vocals, bass guitar, acoustic guitar, drums, percussions, accordion
- Joey Kelly – vocals, electric guitar
- John Kelly – vocals, acoustic guitar, drums
- Kathy Kelly – vocals, piano, keyboards, accordion, hurdy gurdy
- Maite Kelly – vocals
- Paddy Kelly – vocals, guitar, electric guitar, drums, keyboards, flute
- Patricia Kelly – vocals, bombo
- Hartmut Pfannmüller – drums

Technical and production

- Album producers: Dan Kelly, Kathy Kelly, Paddy Kelly
- Executive producers: Dan Kelly, Mike Ungefehr
- Writing: The Kelly Family
- Recording: Günther Kasper
- Mastering: Radu Marinescu, Pfannmüller
- Mixing: Pfannmüller
- Mixing assistance: Kathy Kelly, Ungefehr
- Photography: Thomas Stachelhaus
- Hairstyling: Uschi Ries
- Cover design: Dan Kelly

== Charts ==
=== Weekly charts ===
Chart performance for Over the Hump
Chart (1994–2020)	Peak position
Austrian Albums (Ö3 Austria)	1
Dutch Albums (Album Top 100)	24
European Albums (IFPI)	11
German Albums (Offizielle Top 100)	1
Hungarian Albums (MAHASZ)	3
Norwegian Albums (VG-lista)	26
Swiss Albums (Schweizer Hitparade)	1

=== Year-end charts ===
Year-end chart performance for Over the Hump
Chart (1994)	Position
European Albums (IFPI)	97
German Albums (Offizielle Top 100)	22

Chart (1995)	Position
Austrian Albums (Ö3 Austria)	1
Dutch Albums (Album Top 100)	76
European Albums (IFPI)	11
German Albums (Offizielle Top 100)	1
Swiss Albums (Schweizer Hitparade)	1

Chart (1996)	Position
Austrian Albums (Ö3 Austria)	47
German Albums (Offizielle Top 100)	18

== Certifications ==
Sales certifications for Over the Hump
Region	Certification	Certified units/sales
Austria (IFPI Austria)	3× Platinum	150,000^{*}
Denmark (IFPI Danmark)	Gold	25,000^{^}
Germany (BVMI)	9× Gold	3,000,000
Netherlands (NVPI)	Gold	50,000^{^}
Poland (ZPAV)	3× Platinum	300,000^{*}
Spain (PROMUSICAE)	Platinum	100,000^{^}
Switzerland (IFPI Switzerland)	3× Platinum	150,000^{^}
Summaries
Europe (IFPI)	2× Platinum	4,000,000
^{*} Sales figures based on certification alone.^{^} Shipments figures based on certification alone.
