= From Their Hearts =

Studio album by The Kelly Family
- Released: 1998
- Studio: Sound Studio N (Cologne, Germany); Capri Digital Studio (Capri, Italy)
- Genre: Pop; pop rock; folk
- Length: 51:48
- Label: Kel-Life
- Producer: Kathy Kelly; Paddy Kelly

The Kelly Family chronology
Live Live Live (1997)	From Their Hearts (1998)	The Bonus-Tracks Album (1999)

From Their Hearts is the twelfth regular studio album by European-American pop group The Kelly Family. Based on a concept by Dan Kelly, it was co-produced by Kathy and Paddy Kelly and released in 1998 throughout most of Europe. As it failed to produce any top-ten single, the album performed noticeably worse on the charts than its predecessors, reaching the top ten of the albums chart in Germany only. From Their Hearts eventually became the band's last regular studio album in their 1990s nine-person line-up, as Kathy and Johnny Kelly left the group for solo careers and did not return for the recording of their follow-up, 2002's La Patata.

== Track listing ==
No.	Title	Writer(s)	Length
1.	"I Feel Love" (lead vocals: Paddy, Angelo, Maite)	The Kelly Family	3:27
2.	"Hooks" (lead vocals: Barby, Paddy)	The Kelly Family	3:13
3.	"Please Don't Go" (lead vocals: Patricia, Jimmy)	The Kelly Family	4:15
4.	"I Really Love You" (lead vocals: John)	The Kelly Family	3:46
5.	"Maximum" (lead vocals: Joey)	The Kelly Family	3:26
6.	"Oh It Hurts" (lead vocals: Maite)	The Kelly Family	3:35
7.	"Yo te quiero" (lead vocals: Kathy)	The Kelly Family	3:22
8.	"Dance to the Rock'n'Roll" (lead vocals: Sean, Paddy, Maite)	The Kelly Family	3:19
9.	"Why Don't You Go" (lead vocals: Paddy)	The Kelly Family	4:03
10.	"You're Losing Me" (lead vocals: Kathy)	The Kelly Family	4:06
11.	"You Got Me Rockin' Now" (lead vocals: Paddy, Angelo, Maite)	The Kelly Family	2:57
12.	"Hallelujah" (lead vocals: Joey)	The Kelly Family	3:43
13.	"Sweetest Angel" (lead vocals: Barby)	The Kelly Family	3:42
14.	"I Will Be Your Bride" (lead vocals: Angelo)	The Kelly Family	4:23

== Charts ==
=== Weekly charts ===
Chart (1998)	Peak position
Austrian Albums (Ö3 Austria)	14
Belgian Albums (Ultratop Flanders)	21
Dutch Albums (Album Top 100)	17
German Albums (Offizielle Top 100)	3
Hungarian Albums (MAHASZ)	16
Swiss Albums (Schweizer Hitparade)	12

=== Year-end charts ===
Chart (1998)	Position
Belgian Albums (Ultratop Flanders)	94
