= Christmas for All =

Studio album by The Kelly Family
- Released: October 1, 1994
- Recorded: 1994
- Genre: Christmas
- Length: 48:30
- Label: Kel-Life
- Producer: Hartmut Pfannmüller; Kathy Kelly

The Kelly Family chronology
Over the Hump (1994)	Christmas for All (1994)	Almost Heaven (1996)

Christmas for All is a Christmas album by European-American pop group The Kelly Family. It was released on October 1, 1995 by Kel-life Music.

== Track listing ==
No.	Title	Length
1.	"One More Happy Christmas"	3:43
2.	"Santa Maria"	3:08
3.	"White Christmas"	3:09
4.	"Peces"	3:48
5.	"Rudolph, the Rednosed Reindeer"	3:06
6.	"Two Front Teeth"	2:20
7.	"First Noel"	3:15
8.	"Ave Maria"	3:55
9.	"Oh Holy Night"	2:30
10.	"Chi-Qui-Rri-Tin" (A Medley of Spanish Christmas Songs)	3:21
11.	"Who'll Come with Me (David's Song)"	3:49
12.	"Jingle Bells"	2:59
13.	"Little Drummer Boy"	2:43
14.	"We Are the World"	5:22
15.	"Santa Maria (Reprise)"	1:15

== Charts ==
Chart (1995)	Peak position
Austrian Albums (Ö3 Austria)	1
German Albums (Offizielle Top 100)	2
Swiss Albums (Schweizer Hitparade)	2

== Certifications ==
Region	Certification	Certified units/sales
Austria (IFPI Austria)	Platinum	50,000^{*}
Germany (BVMI)	Gold	250,000^{^}
Poland (ZPAV)	Gold	50,000^{*}
Switzerland (IFPI Switzerland)	Platinum	50,000^{^}
^{*} Sales figures based on certification alone.^{^} Shipments figures based on certification alone.
