= Fell in Love with an Alien =

Single by The Kelly Family

from the album Almost Heaven
- Released: 1997
- Length: 3:11
- Label: KEL-Life
- Songwriter: The Kelly Family
- Producers: Kathy Kelly; Paddy Kelly

The Kelly Family singles chronology
"Gott Deine Kinder" (1996)	"Fell in Love with an Alien" (1997)	"Nanana" (1997)

"Fell in Love with an Alien" is a song by Irish-American pop group The Kelly Family. It was produced by Kathy Kelly and Paddy Kelly for their ninth studio album Almost Heaven (1996), featuring lead vocals by both siblings. The song was released as the album's third single in the first quarter of 1997 and reached the top five of the Dutch Singles Chart.

== Track listings ==
Maxi single
No.	Title	Length
1.	"Fell In Love With An Alien"	3:11
2.	"Never Gonna Break Me Down"	4:31
3.	"Come Back to Me"	3:35

== Charts ==
=== Weekly charts ===
Chart (1997)	Peak position
Austria (Ö3 Austria Top 40)	15
Belgium (Ultratop 50 Flanders)	30
Germany (GfK)	15
Netherlands (Dutch Top 40)	3
Netherlands (Single Top 100)	4
Switzerland (Schweizer Hitparade)	14

=== Year-end charts ===
Chart (1997)	Position
Belgium (Ultratop 50 Flanders)	97
Netherlands (Dutch Top 40)	21
Netherlands (Single Top 100)	44
Romania (Romanian Top 100)	54
