= I Can't Help Myself (The Kelly Family song) =

1996 single by the Kelly Family

Single by the Kelly Family

from the album Almost Heaven
- Released: 1996
- Length: 3:03
- Label: KEL-Life
- Songwriter: The Kelly Family
- Producers: Kathy Kelly; Paddy Kelly

The Kelly Family singles chronology
"First Time" (1995)	"I Can't Help Myself" (1996)	"Every Baby" (1996)

"I Can't Help Myself" (subtitled "I Love You, I Want You" for the single release) is a song by European-American pop music group the Kelly Family. Written by Angelo Kelly, it was produced by Kathy Kelly and Paddy Kelly for their ninth studio album, Almost Heaven (1996), and features lead vocals by Paddy and Angelo Kelly. The song was released as the album's lead single and reached number one in the Czech Republic, Germany, the Netherlands, Norway, and Switzerland.

== Track listings ==
CD maxi single
No.	Title	Length
1.	"I Can't Help Myself (I Love You, I Want You)"	3:03
2.	"Look Up My File"	2:25

== Credits and personnel ==
Credits are adapted from the liner notes of Almost Heaven.

- Songwriting – The Kelly Family
- Production – Kathy Kelly, Paddy Kelly
- Executive production – Dan Kelly, Mike Ungefehr
- Engineering, mixing – Günther Kasper, Max Carola
- Mixing assistance – Georgi Nedeltschev, Kathy Kelly, Paddy Kelly
- Mastering – Dieter Wegner, Georgi Nedeltschev

== Charts ==
=== Weekly charts ===
Chart (1996)	Peak position
Austria (Ö3 Austria Top 40)	2
Belgium (Ultratop 50 Flanders)	11
Czech Republic (IFPI CR)	1
Denmark (IFPI)	5
Germany (GfK)	1
Netherlands (Dutch Top 40)	1
Netherlands (Single Top 100)	1
Norway (VG-lista)	1
Switzerland (Schweizer Hitparade)	1

=== Year-end charts ===
Chart (1996)	Position
Austria (Ö3 Austria Top 40)	8
Germany (Media Control)	6
Netherlands (Dutch Top 40)	5
Netherlands (Single Top 100)	4
Norway (VG-lista)	2
Switzerland (Schweizer Hitparade)	9

Chart (1997)	Position
Belgium (Ultratop 50 Flanders)	49
Romania (Romanian Top 100)	59

=== Decade-end charts ===
Chart (1990–1999)	Rank
Austria (Ö3 Austria Top 40)	70
Netherlands (Dutch Top 40)	42

== Certifications ==
Certifications and sales for "I Can't Help Myself"
Region	Certification	Certified units/sales
Austria (IFPI Austria)	Gold	25,000^{*}
Germany (BVMI)	Platinum	500,000^{^}
Norway (IFPI Norway)	2× Platinum	
Poland (ZPAV)	Gold	10,000^{*}
Spain (Promusicae)	Platinum	50,000^{^}
Switzerland (IFPI Switzerland)	Gold	25,000^{^}
^{*} Sales figures based on certification alone.^{^} Shipments figures based on certification alone.
