= Agur Jaunak =

"Agur Jaunak" ("Greetings, Sir!"), is a Basque song which is sung at particular ceremonies to welcome someone recently arrived or to say goodbye to a friend, or to welcome a visitor as he/she deserves to be. It consists of a form of displaying honour and welcoming those present and the guests. Normally it is sung a cappella in one or various voices, and it is a custom that the audience stand up to hear this song.

== Origins ==
It comes from a popular Lapurdian melody for hunting and in its evolution has been adapted into other versions by multiple musicians. Jose Olaizola Gabarain was the author of the first and best-known version of "Agur Jaunak". It was presented for the first time on 1 August 1918 in the Sanctuary of Loyola for the festival of Saint Ignatius. It became popular at the celebration of the Congress of Basque Studies that took place in Oñati in September 1918.

Despite all of this it is difficult to state categorically where certain popular melodies originated — as José Luis Ansorena says, "no language can brag that it has not been influenced by another; there is no songbook in the world which can boast absolute autonomy". Ansorena stated on the 22nd of August 1983:

Regarding Agur Jaunak, I'll tell you what happened to me in Vienna in 1955. I was having dinner in the restaurant located in the wine cellar of the old imperial palace when the person who was enlivening the evening by playing the zither began to play a melody which was identical to that of this song. When he finished I approached him and asked what the origin of that music was. He told me that he could not say precisely, but that it was an ancient popular Viennese melody. I hummed Agur Jaunak to him, telling him that it was a Basque song and he told me that it was indeed the same.

Antonio Peña y Goñi, a celebrated composer, musicologist and music and bullfighting critic and the founder of the Orfeón Donostiarra (San Sebastian concert choir), explained the origin of this song in a conference which was held in 1898 at the Madrid Press Association:

The Gipuzkoan Manuel Lecuona was a renowned pelota player and outstanding singer of bertso and guitarist, who divided his time between playing pelota and singing. After winning a match against a team of Frenchmen, a valiant young boy approached the victors and sang this song, which Urchalle (that was his nickname at the time) went on to incorporate into his repertoire, having understood that it was about requesting or offering a rematch.

== Translation to English ==
Basque dialectal text:

Agur, jaunak,
jaunak, agur,
agur t´erdi.

Danak Jainkoak eiñak gire
zuek eta bai gu ere.

Agur, jaunak,
jaunak, agur,
hemen gire.

English:

Hail, Good Sirs,
Good Sirs, Hail
Thrice Hail !

We all are God´s creatures
You and we both.

Hai, Good Sirs,
Good Sirs, hail!
Here we are, all present.

The translation needs certain explanations from the original Basque words:

"Agur" is a Basque word that we can translate into English both as "hail" and as "farewell".

"Jaunak" in the context of the song means gentlemen, sirs, people of certain social stature, someone who deserves certain courtesy.

When you are appreciated a lot or you are held in great esteem or profound respect one says "Agur t´erdi" — with a strange translation of "hello/goodbye 'and a half'" — which in the Basque Country is one of the highest greetings.

When we say "Hemen gire", which means "here we are", we make reference to a feeling, and it says to us: here we are and we will continue here because it is our land, here we are to serve you.

It is said that whenever this melody and song are performed, Basque people stand up.

== Partiture ==
The work was written in three-beat meter ¾. Its melody is a simple, unique tone; it basically moves over two chords (tonic and dominant).

== Bibliography ==
- (in Spanish) Agur Jaunak Auñamendi Eusko Entziklopedia
- (in Spanish) PÉREZ ARREGUI, Ignacio: El Diario Vasco, 31-VII; 1-VIII-1963
- (in Spanish) EZCURDIA, Luis: Los Miqueletes, 211-218. Zarauz : Icharopena, D.L. 1968
