= Eresbil =

Spanish musical archive

Coordinates: 43°18′51″N 1°54′04″W

Eresbil is an archive of Basque music located in Errenteria, Gipuzkoa, Spain. Its principal aim is the collection, preservation, protection and dissemination of the Basque musical heritage and, especially, the output of Basque composers.

It emerged in 1974 as a result of the need to set the repertory for Musikaste, a week music festival in Renteria devoted to the spreading of Basque composers. Jose Luis Ansorena, within the Andra Mari Choir, the organizer of Musikaste since 1973, took the initiative to create a center to collect the works that could be spread by this festival. The collection of scores of Basque-navarre composers throughout the time began in 1974.

Nowadays, it contains over 200,000 documents, 93,997 of which are audiovisual documents and 74,441 are sheets. Other 16,810 documents complete the collection, including books, magazines and microforms, and also 15,669 copies of varied documentation, such as letters, photographs, programs and posters.

The archive consists of different sections:

- Basque composers: at the beginning, the score collection of Basque–navarre composers was carried out through queries in libraries and archives, purchase and collaboration with creatives. Since 2000, a score legal deposit copy is collected from the Basque Country Autonomous Community.
- Archives collections: documentary collections, archives and individual libraries, as well as institutional collections, began to arrive in 1978, either in terms of donation or as assignment on depot.
- Sound archives: this section stores the sound records of the works created by Basque composers. At present, the initial scope has been enlarged to include the entire musical production which is edited in the Basque Country, as well as the one concerning Basque musicians. Since 2000 a sound recording legal deposit copy is collected from the Basque Country Autonomous Community.
- Musical library: this section compiles the main printed sources for the musical research development, with an important presence of reference works. Furthermore, it collects European score collections to help musicians find and study repertory.
- Documentation: this section collects all kind of materials related to composers and music subjects in documents such as articles, press, letters and reports, and it also contains a poster collection, programs, photographs and iconography.
