= Gamonal =

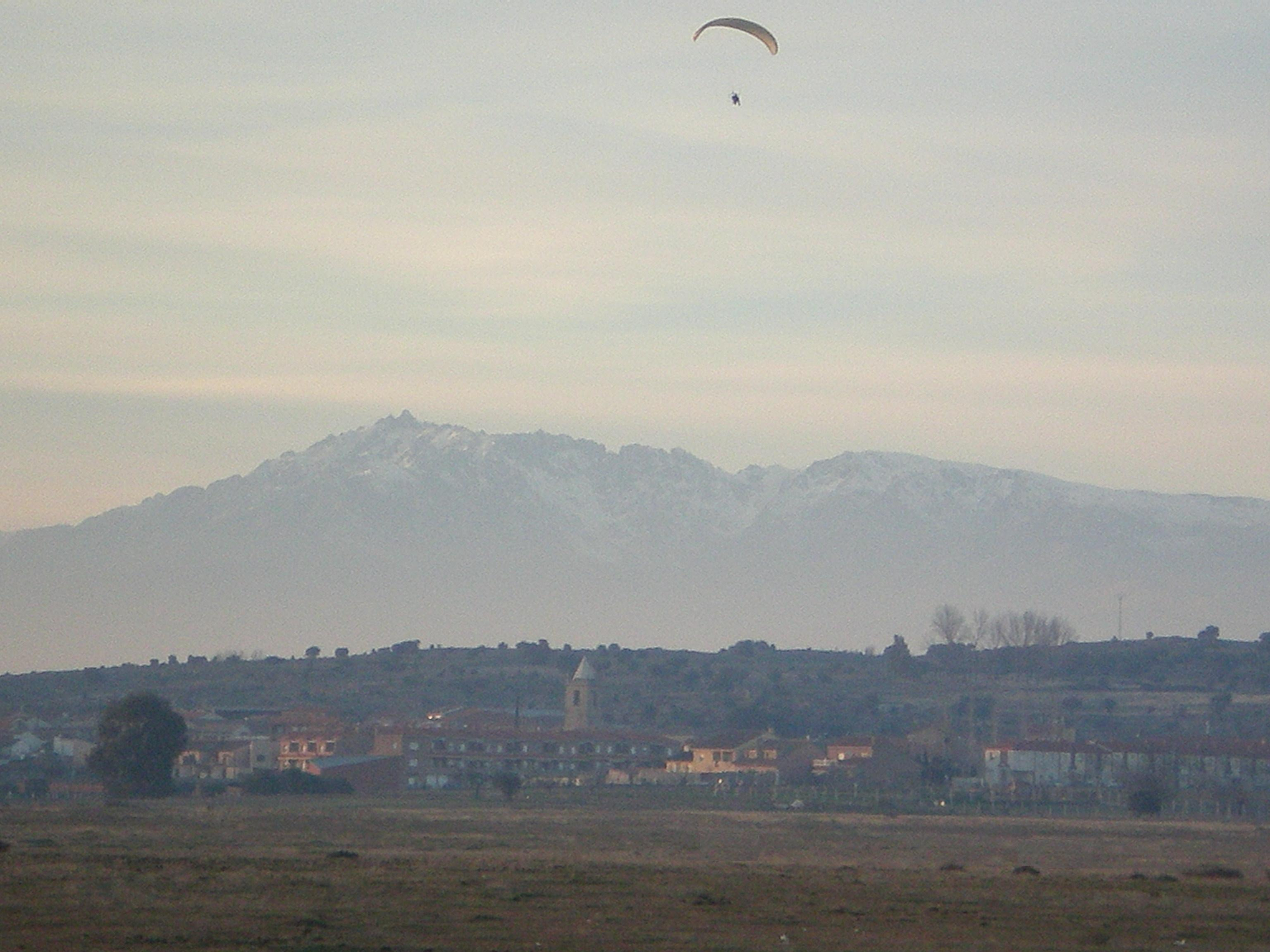
- Gamonal and Sierra de Gredos panoramic view

- Flag Coat of arms

- Location in Spain
- Coordinates: 39°57′39″N 4°57′36″W
- Country: Spain
- Autonomous community: Castile-La Mancha
- Province: Toledo

Government
  - Alcaldesa: María del Prado Gómez (PSOE)

Area
  - Total: 32 km^{2} (12 sq mi)
- Elevation: 400 m (1,300 ft)

Population (2010)
  - Total: 976
  - Density: 31/km^{2} (79/sq mi)
- Demonym(s): Gamonino, na
- Time zone: UTC+1 (CET)
  - Summer (DST): UTC+2 (CEST)
- Postal code: 45613
- Dialing code: (+34)925

Gamonal (Spanish pronunciation: [ɡa.moˈnal]) is a little Spanish village, situated in the municipality of Talavera de la Reina (province of Toledo, Castile-La Mancha).

== Geography and Demography ==
Gamonal is located in the middle of Spain, in the northwestern part of Toledo province, 30 km south of the Sierra de Gredos, 10 km north of the river Tagus, 130 km southwest of Madrid, 105 km south of Ávila and 98 km west of the city of Toledo.

Its population in 2010 was 976.

The inhabitants of the village are known as 'Gamoninos' (feminine form: 'Gamoninas').

== Transport ==
Gamonal is well communicated, important roads are next to the village:

- Autovía A-5 (Madrid - Lisbon).
- N-400 (Ávila-Córdoba).
