= Patricia Kelly =

Irish-American singer and songwriter

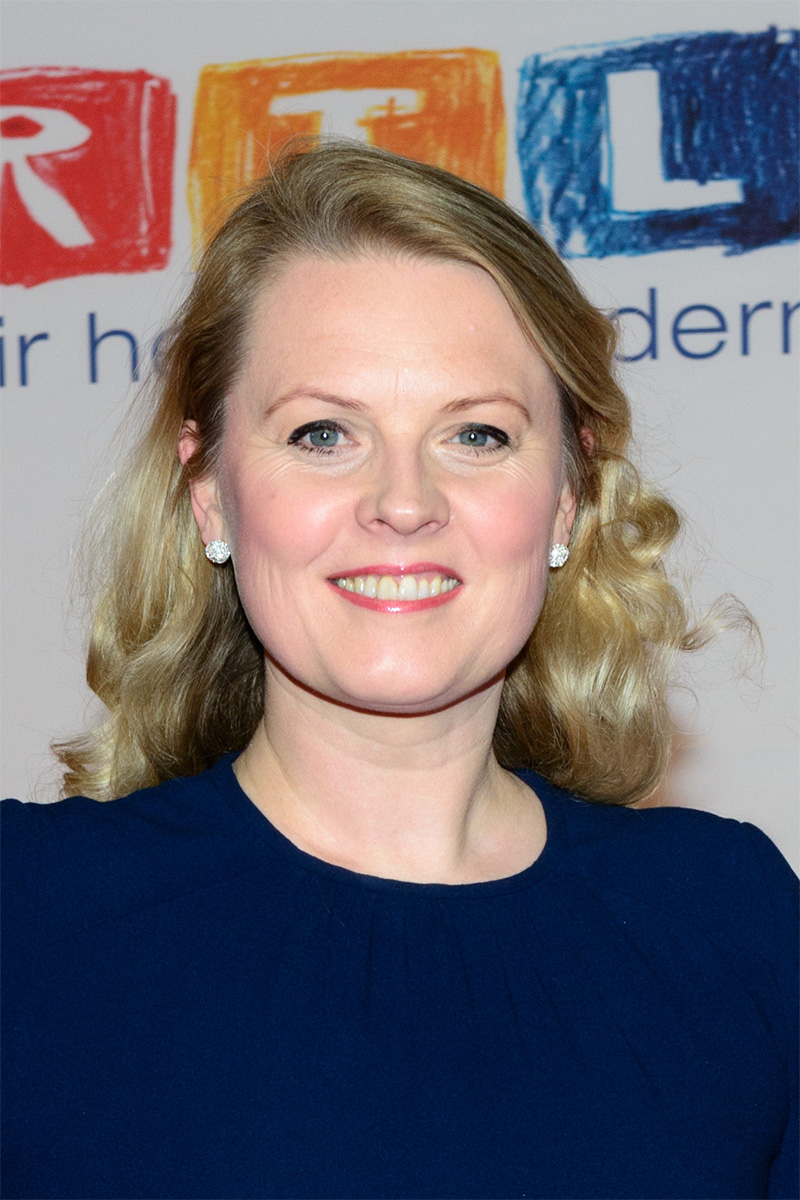
- Kelly in 2014

Background information
- Born: Maria Patricia Kelly; 22 November 1969 (age 56); Gamonal, Spain
- Genres: Pop; folk
- Occupations: Singer; songwriter
- Spouse: Denis Sawinkin (m. 2001)
- Website: patricia-kelly.com

Maria Patricia Kelly is an Irish-American singer and songwriter. Born in Gamonal, Spain, she came to prominence with her musical family The Kelly Family, a multi-generational pop group that achieved success in Europe, in the 1990s. During their hiatus, Kelly released several solo albums.

== Discography ==
=== Studio albums ===
List of singles, with selected chart positions, showing year released
| Title | Album details | Peak positions | | |
| Title | Album details | AUT | GER | SWI |
|---|---|---|---|---|
| It Is Essential | Released: 1 January 2010; Label: Patricia Kelly Records; Formats: CD, digital download | — | — | — |
| Blessed Christmas | Released: 1 November 2012; Label: Patricia Kelly Records; Formats: CD, digital download | — | — | — |
| Grace & Kelly | Released: 25 March 2016; Label: Musicstarter; Formats: CD, digital download | — | 43 | — |
| One More Year | Released: 6 March 2020; Label: Electrola; Formats: CD, digital download | 7 | 3 | 7 |
| Unbreakable | Released: 30 December 2021; Label: Electrola; Formats: CD, digital download | 26 | 2 | 12 |

=== Live CDs ===
- Essential (double CD) (2011)
- Songs & Stories (2015)
- Grace&Kelly - Live in concert (2016)
- My Christmas Concert (2020)

=== EPs ===
- A New Room (2008)
- Essential (2009)

=== DVDs ===
- Von Geist der Weihnacht (musical) (2009)
- Essential (live DVD)
- Grace&Kelly - live in concert (2016)
