= Maite Kelly =

German-Irish singer and actress

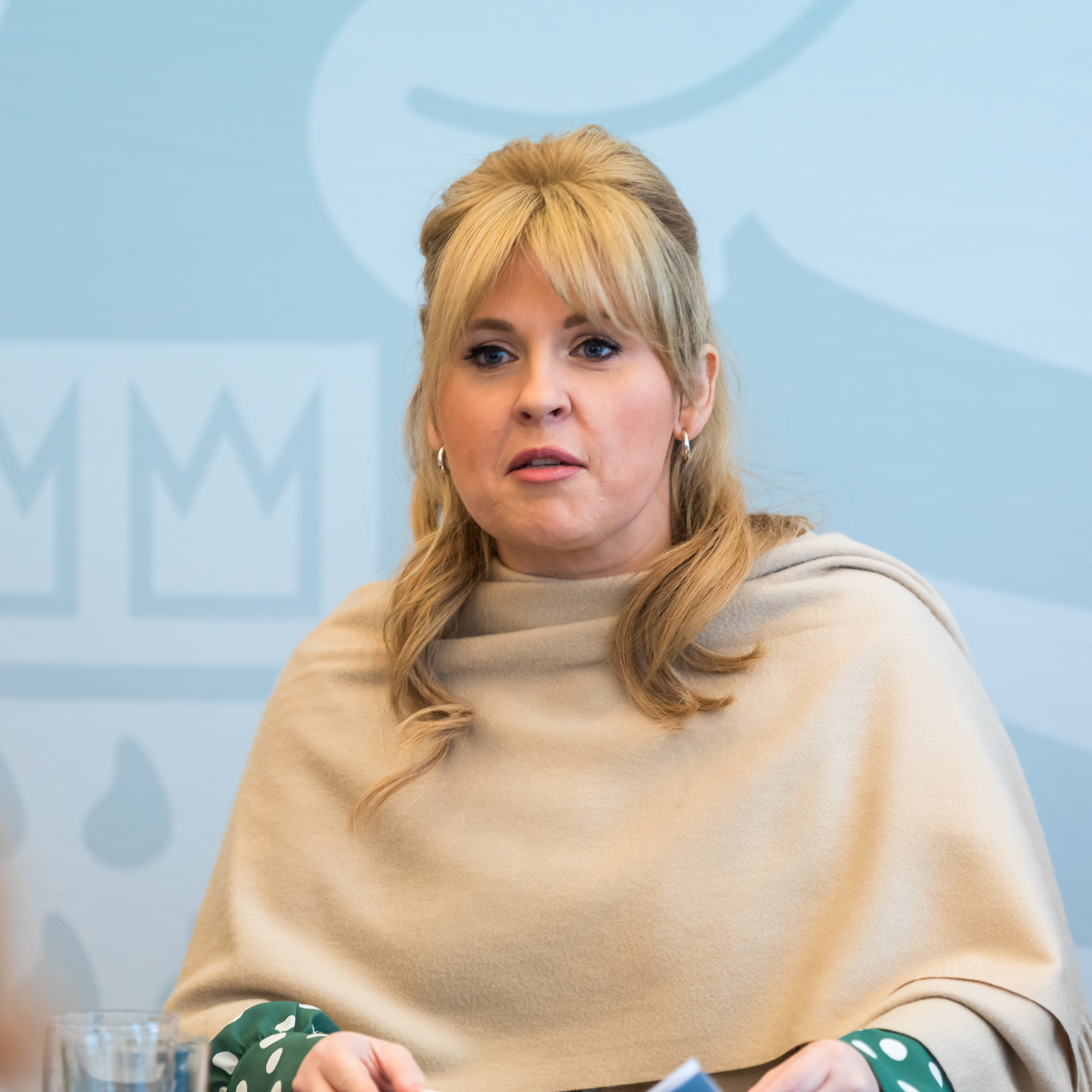
- Kelly in 2020
- Born: Maite Star Kelly; 4 December 1979 (age 46); West Berlin, West Germany (now Berlin, Germany)
- Occupation: Singer
- Spouse: Florent Michel Raimond (m. 2005; div. 2018)
- Children: 3
- Musical career
- Genres: Pop; Schlager; Europop
- Instrument: Vocals
- Labels: Electrola

Maite Star Kelly (born 4 December 1979) is a German-born Irish-American singer and actress, who is the second youngest child of The Kelly Family and is the only one born in Germany. When she was younger, Kelly worked singing with her family. Later, she started a solo career.

== Biography ==
Kelly was born in West Berlin to Daniel and Barbara Kelly. She is one of The Kelly Family, a music group made up of members of the extended Kelly family. Their style of music is folk, pop and pop rock. Her siblings first appeared as Kelly Kids in 1974 and they traveled through the USA and Europe under the name The Kelly Family from 1978 and performed numerous free concerts in public places and pedestrian zones as street musicians. Though she was born in Germany, Kelly was educated in the USA. However she lives in Cologne. She was married to model Florent Michel Raimond with whom she had three children. Her first solo album was released in 2007. She went on to take part in the German version of the musical Hairspray and appear in Dancing with the stars. Kelly wrote the children's book, Die kleine Hummel Bommel which was published in 2015. In 2012, she was awarded the Order of Merit of the State of North Rhine-Westphalia for "her role model as an artist and socially committed citizen" and in 2019 she was given an award by SWR4.

== Discography ==
=== Studio albums ===
List of albums, with selected chart positions and certifications
Title	Album details	Peak chart positions			Certifications
Title	Album details	GER	AUT	SWI	Certifications
The Unofficial Album	Released: 1 October 2011; Label: Delta; Formats: CD, digital download	—	—	—	
Das volle Programm	Released: 16 September 2011; Label: Polydor; Formats: CD, digital download	23	—	—	
Wie ich bin	Released: 29 March 2013; Label: Telamo; Formats: CD, digital download	87	—	—	
Sieben Leben für dich	Released: 14 October 2016; Label: Electrola; Formats: CD, digital download	8	8	23	GER: 3× Gold
Die Liebe siegt sowieso	Released: 12 October 2018; Label: Electrola; Formats: CD, digital download	3	4	4	AUT: Gold; GER: Gold
Hello!	Released: 19 March 2021; Label: Electrola; Formats: CD, digital download	1	1	3	
Nur Liebe	Released: 28 March 2024; Label: Electrola; Formats: CD, digital download	2	2	4	
