= Joey Kelly =

Musician, songwriter, and athlete

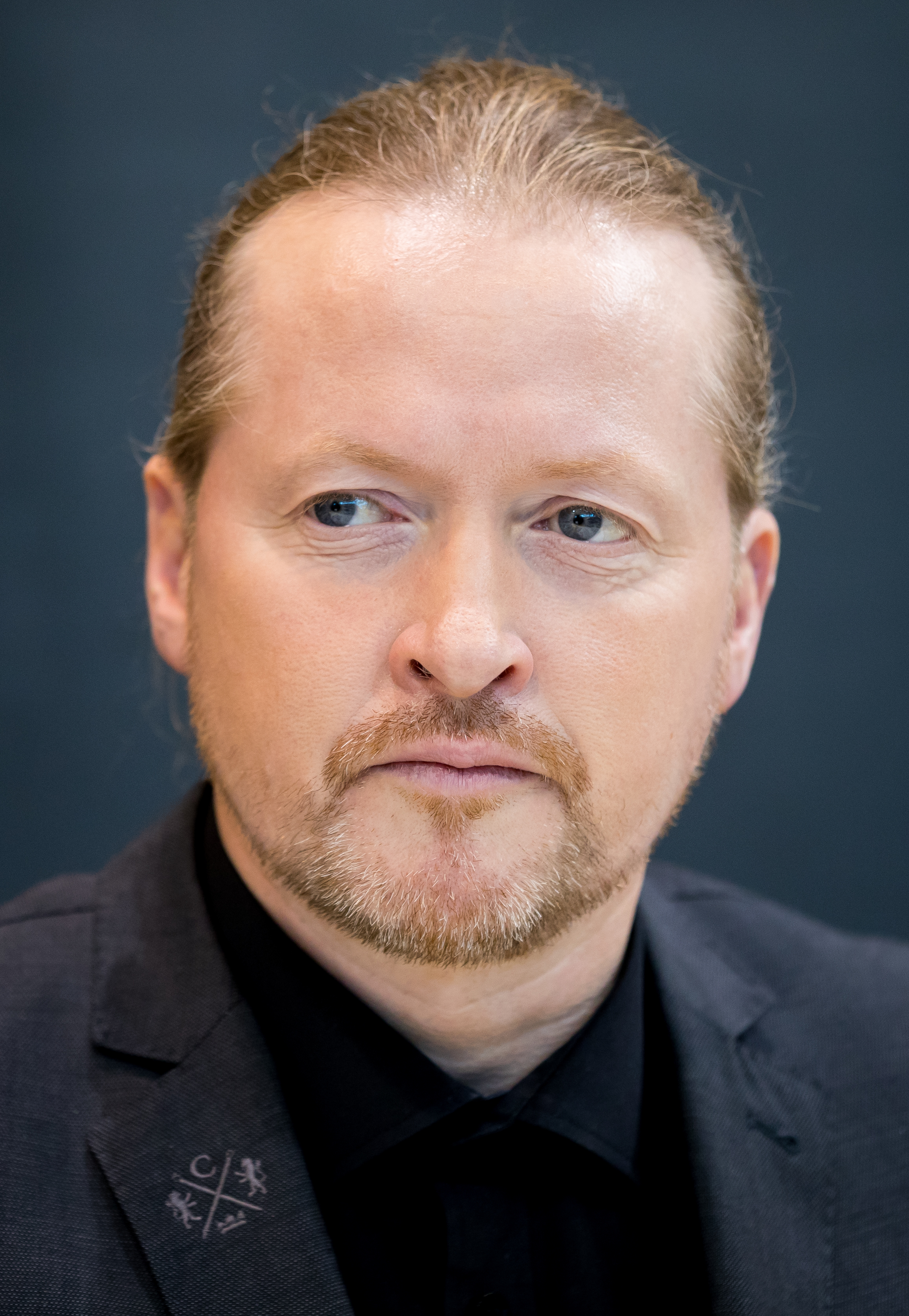
- Kelly in 2017
- Born: Joseph Maria Kelly; 20 December 1972 (age 53); Toledo, Spain
- Occupations: Musician, extreme athlete
- Known for: Member of the Kelly Family
- Spouse: Tanja Niethen (m. 2005)
- Children: 4
- Website: joeykelly.de

Joseph Maria Kelly (born 20 December 1972) is a musician, songwriter, and athlete of Irish-American descent.

Kelly became known as a member of the Kelly Family, however, during the band's hiatus, he appeared primarily as an amateur athlete and participated in various sport competitions. Kelly returned to the Kelly Family as a guitarist and vocalist in 2017. As a member of the Kelly family, he plays electric and acoustic guitar and percussion instruments.

Sports enthusiast Kelly often participates in endurance competitions and fun events, such as TV total, Wok racing or diving.

== Sports ==
=== Endurance ===
As of 2006, Kelly has finished over 50 marathons and has participated in endurance competitions – including events such as Ultramarathon, Ironman Triathlon or Tough-Guy-Race.

He took part at the Ultraman competition in Hawaii, 1998 (10 km swimming, 421 km cycling, 84 km running in three days) and finished seventh, he reached the goal within the time limit, but was subsequently disqualified for unsportsmanlike conduct, after kicking a prone volunteer in the head following an "earlier altercation".

In the Race Across America (RAAM) 2001, a long-distance bicycle race across the United States, he finished together with Thorsten Vahl as fourth of seven competing teams and in 2002 he finished in the winning 4 person mixed team, which included his wife. In 2008 he participated in the Atacama Crossing in Chile and finished the 250 kilometres in 6 days, 36:15:3 hours. He finished the six legs in fourth place, becoming first in his age group in one of the toughest desert races in the world.

=== Television events ===
Wok-WM

- 2003: Silver (Single)
- 2004: Silver (Single), Gold (Quad)
- 2005: Bronze (Single), Gold (Quad)
- 2006: Gold (Single)
- 2007: Silver (Single)
- 2008: Bronze (Single)
- 2009: Bronze (Single)
- 2010: Silver (Single)
- 2014: Gold (Single)

Turmspringen (diving)

- 2007: Gold (Single)
- 2008: Silver (Single), Bronze (Synchronous)
- 2009: Bronze (Singles), Gold (Synchronous)

Stockcar Crash Challenge

- 2006: Rodeo winner

Auto Ball-EM

- 2008: Runner-up
- 2024: Winner

German Cup Eisfußball

- 2009: Winner

Poker Night

- 2009: Winner

7 vs Wild, Kanada

- 2023

7 vs Wild: Crashed

- 2024
