= Kathy Kelly (musician) =

American singer

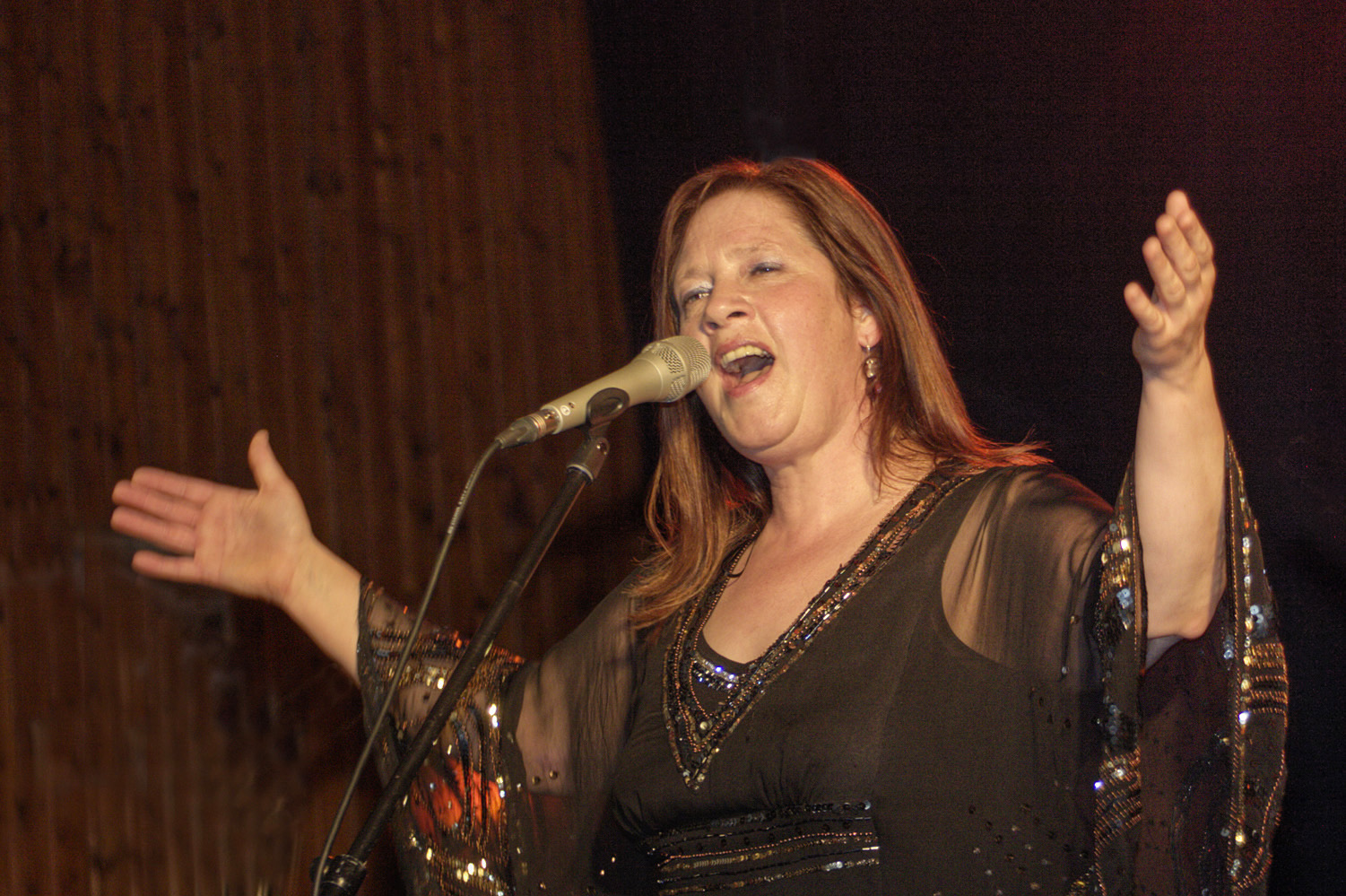
- Kelly in 2010

Background information
- Born: Kathleen Anne Kelly; 6 March 1963 (age 63)
- Genres: pop; folk; rock
- Occupations: singer-songwriter; producer
- Website: www.kathyannekelly.com

Kathleen Ann Kelly (born March 6, 1963) is a singer, songwriter, and producer. Born in Leominster, Massachusetts, she is the third child of The Kelly Family, a multi-generational pop group that achieved success in Europe in the 1990s. She's currently the oldest member of the group, the "Grandmother" of the family.

In 1999, Kelly released her first solo album, The Best of Kathy Kelly, which included her best songs from The Kelly Family albums as well as five new songs. While continuing to record and tour with the group throughout the 2000s, Kelly pursued her solo projects, resulting in three additional LPs and several singles to date. Some of these works featured new versions of traditional songs from around the world, previously performed by the group since the 1970s; notable songs include "Amazing Grace," "Motherless Child," "Old Black Joe," and "The Rose of Tralee".

== Early years ==
Kathy was born in the United States in 1963. She is the third of five children born to Daniel Kelly Sr. and Joanne.

Kathy was homeschooled, as were her older and younger siblings. She also learned ballet and began playing the violin. Later, she became a teacher to her younger siblings. Kathy can also play the guitar, accordion, keyboards, and piano, among other instruments.

== The Kelly Family ==
In 1974, Kathy, Caroline, Paul, John, and Patricia formed The Kelly Kids to perform at children's parties and on the streets. The band later became known as The Kelly Family when Dan and Barbara joined, followed by other siblings.

The Kelly Family gained popularity in their early years as a street band. Kathy typically played the violin alongside Paul, but after Caroline left, she began playing the accordion more frequently. Kathy was also the primary arranger of most of the group's songs and was the first of her siblings to write an original song. She is credited with writing Lonely, a song recorded in 1981 featuring lead vocals by John, the then-main vocalist, and Papa Dan. Kathy was also one of the main producers, recording most of the family's albums from the 1980s through the late 1990s.

The year 1994 marked a major breakthrough for the Kelly Family, as they began selling CDs in stores. Their album Over the Hump sold 5 million copies. This success was followed by albums such as Christmas for All, Almost Heaven, Growin' Up, and From Their Hearts. In From Their Hearts, Kathy's son Sean is featured on vocals in the track "Dance to the Rock 'n Roll."

In 2000, Kathy left the band to pursue a solo career. Her last song with the group was By Myself but Not Alone, sung with her brother John in 1999.

Kathy later returned to tour with the band from 2007 to 2008.

She also participated in Paddy Kelly's Stille Nacht Tour in 2011, performing alongside Paul, Patricia, Joey Kelly, Michael Patrick Kelly, and guest Caroline Kelly. Recordings from this tour were released as a live album titled Stille Nacht Live-CD 2011.

Kathy joined the 2012 tour, Stille Nacht 2012, and a live CD from this tour was released in September 2013.

In 2017, the Kelly Family reunited with seven members, and Kathy once again rejoined the band. The Kelly Family released an album titled We Got Love, on which Kathy performs six songs.

Throughout her career with the Kelly Family, Kathy contributed to 32 of their 35 albums and provided vocals on 106 songs, including live CDs, a total exceeded only by Paddy and John.

== Solo career ==
Kathy Kelly began her solo career by releasing a single titled You're Losing Me, which reached number 94 on the German charts. She followed this with a compilation album, The Best of Kathy Kelly, which included some Kelly Family songs along with five new tracks. This album peaked at number 32 on the German chart and number 44 on the Dutch chart.

After leaving the Kelly Family in 2000, Kathy released another album, Morning of My Life, featuring entirely new material. It reached number 22 on the German charts.

In 2002, Kathy released her third studio album, Straight from My Heart. In 2005, she released her fourth album, Godspel, which includes several songs featuring Jimmy Kelly.

Kathy also embarked on the Godspel Tour from 2009 to mid-2012, performing primarily in Germany, as well as in Romania, the Czech Republic, the Netherlands, Austria, and Switzerland.

In September 2012, she launched another European tour, performing in Germany and Romania.

In 2014, Kathy released a holiday album, My Christmas Songs, followed in 2015 by The First. During this period, she performed mainly at festivals and occasional concerts. That same year, she toured with her siblings Paul and Patricia.

On December 31, 2015, and January 2, 2016, Kathy gave her first concerts in Bethlehem.

Toward the end of 2016, she began the Celtic Scottish Christmas Tour with her younger brother Paul.

In 2017, in addition to the Kelly Family comeback, Kathy continued her European tour throughout the year, with one show featuring her brother John Kelly.

== Discography ==
For the recordings together with The Kelly Family, see The Kelly Family discography.

=== Albums ===
- The Best of Kathy Kelly (1999)
- Morning of My Life (2000)
- Straight from My Heart (2002)
- Godspel (2005)
- My Christmas Songs (2014)
- The First (2015)
- Wer lacht überlebt (2019) – German album

=== Singles ===
- "You're Losing Me" (1999)
- "Save Me in the Morning" (2001)
- "Nay No Nay" (2001)
- "My Last Goodbye" (2009)
- "Engelsmensch (Angel Love)" featuring Michael Kraft (2010)
- "You Sleep with Angels" (2012)
