= The Kelly Family =

American-European music group

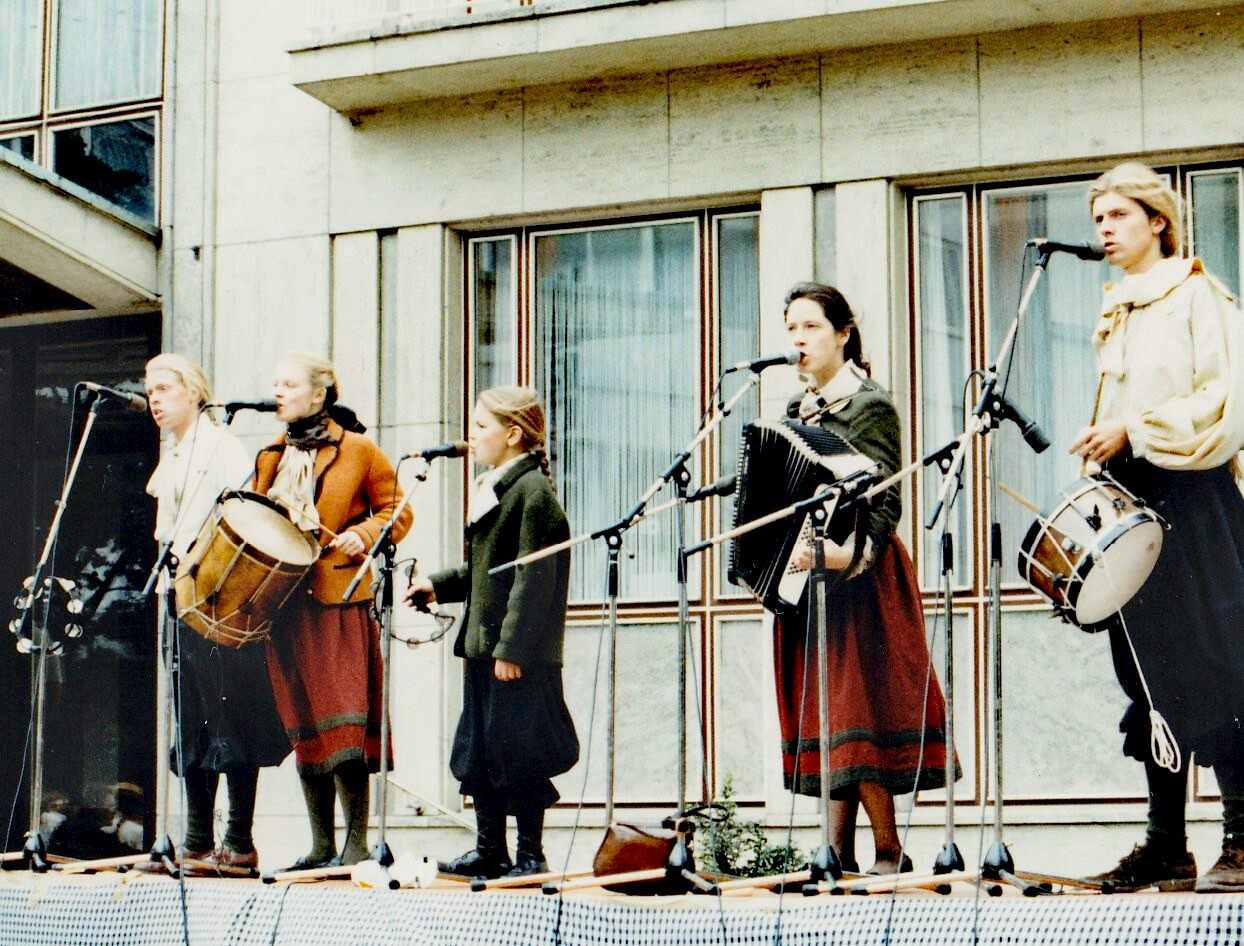
- Left to right: Jimmy, Patricia, Paddy, Kathy and John Kelly in 1989

Background information
- Origin: United States
- Genres: Pop, rock, folklore
- Years active: 1974–2008, 2017–present
- Labels: Kel-Life, EMI, BMG, Ariola, Polydor, Universal
- Members: Kathy Kelly; Patricia Kelly; John Kelly; Joey Kelly; Jimmy Kelly; Paul Kelly
- Past members: Papa Dan Kelly; Mama Barbara-Ann Kelly; Daniel Kelly; Caroline Kelly; Paddy Kelly; Barby Kelly; Maite Kelly; Angelo Kelly
- Website: www.kellyfamily.nl

The Kelly Family is a European-American music group consisting of a multi-generational family, usually nine siblings who were joined occasionally on stage in their earlier years by their parents. They play a repertoire of rock, pop, and folk music, and sing in English, Spanish, German, and Basque. The group had chart and concert success around the world, predominantly in continental Europe—mainly in Germany, the Benelux countries, Scandinavia, the Czech Republic, Poland, Slovakia, Spain, and Portugal—and some in Ireland. They have sold over 20 million albums since the early 1980s and were ranked as the 6th most popular music act in Germany in the 1990s. Despite their American origins, the group is virtually unknown in the United States.

For many years, the group presented a ragamuffin image and a vagabonding lifestyle, travelling around Europe in a double-decker bus and houseboat. Their image was enhanced by their eclectic and often homemade clothing, and the very long hair worn by both male and female members of the band. The Kelly Family began to break up in 2000 and afterwards they performed mostly as individuals or sub-sets of the whole group and took on a more mainstream look.

== The Kelly Kids ==
The patriarch of the family, Daniel Kelly Sr., has been described as a "grizzled, ageing druid aesthetic", but according to his daughter Kathy he was in earlier days "a clean-cut, intense conservative Catholic" who studied for the priesthood. He married his first wife, Joanne, in 1957, and the couple left their native America in 1965 with their children Daniel Jr., Caroline, Kathleen and Paul, and settled in Spain, where Daniel opened an antiques shop.

Daniel Kelly and Joanne separated, and Joanne returned to America with Daniel Jr., who had a disability. In 1970, Kelly married Barbara Ann Suokko (1946–1982), who was from Fitchburg, Massachusetts and of Finnish and Austrian heritage. Daniel and Barbara had eight children, with the eldest, John, born in 1967, and the youngest, Angelo, in 1981. The children were homeschooled and given lessons in music and dance.

In 1974, the older children, Caroline, Daniel, Kathy and Paul, formed the Kelly Kids, at first busking, then performing at parties and local events. They became well-known enough that they appeared on Spanish television in 1975. The band was joined by the younger members of the family as they grew up and learned to play musical instruments. The band's popularity increased in Spain, with several performances on television and in circuses. In 1976, they went on tour as The Kelly Family, in Italy, West Germany and the Netherlands. Their money was stolen during the tour and, penniless, they had to busk on the streets to earn enough for the return trip home.

The family moved to Ireland, living at a campground and touring there in 1977. Then, in 1978, they toured again in their double-decker bus. (They later lived on a large houseboat.) Daniel and Barbara Kelly joined their children for performances, Barbara often performing with a newborn in her arms.

In 1977, they secured a record contract in West Germany. Their first major chart hit came in 1980, with the song "Who'll Come With Me (David's Song)", with John Kelly, aged 12, singing the solo. The song, with a Gaelic sounding melody by Vladimir Cosma, was the theme to a West German television production The Adventures of David Balfour, based on Kidnapped by Robert Louis Stevenson. The song hit #1 in the Netherlands and Belgium, and it reached the top 20 in West Germany.

== Fame ==
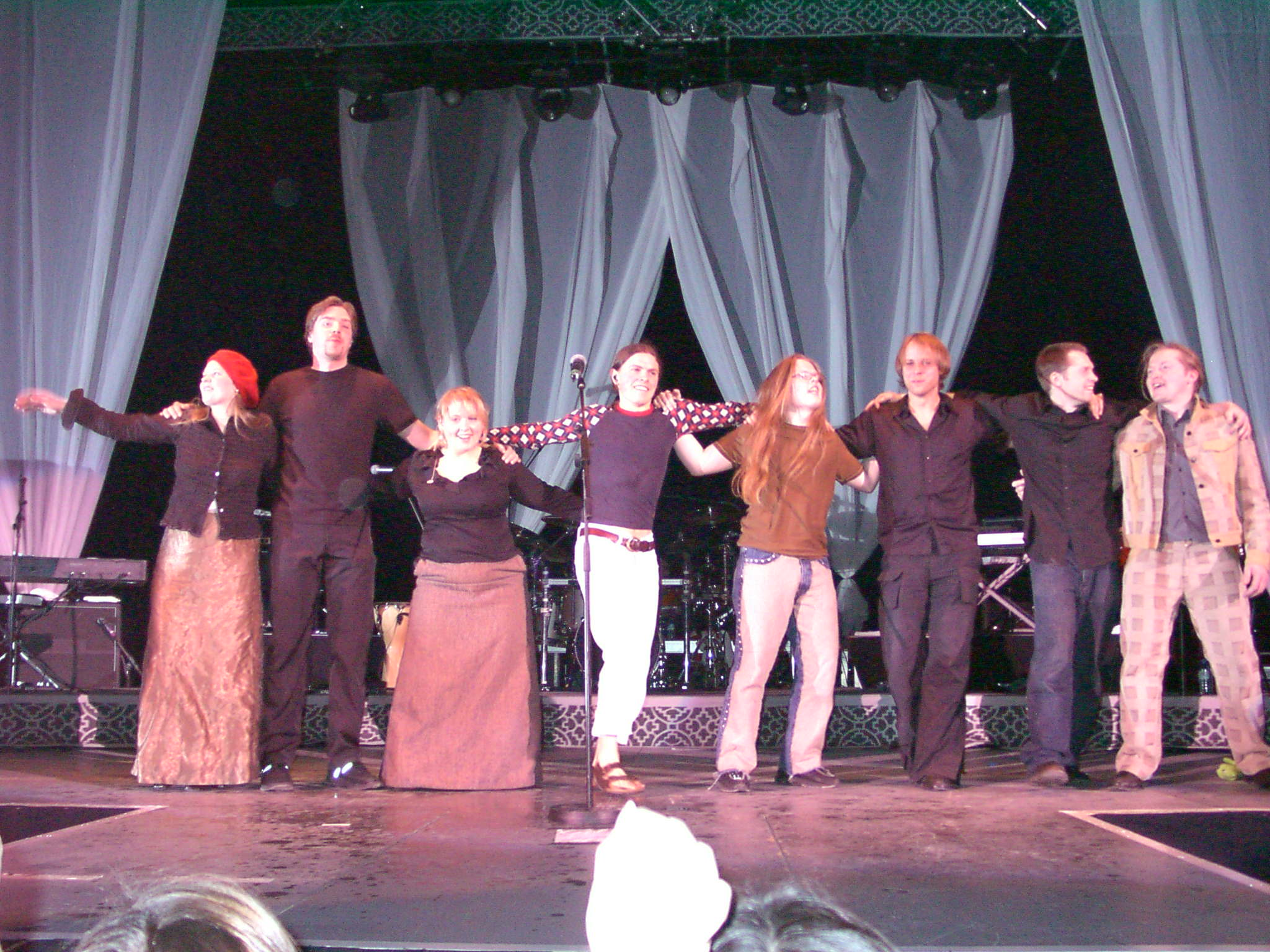
The Kelly Family in 2002

The Kelly Family covered hit songs such as "We Are the World" and "The Rose", but wrote most of their own music based on family and personal experience, their Catholic faith, and their worldview. Songs include "Santa Maria"; "Why, Why, Why"; "An Angel", the video of which popularized younger family member Paddy; "Break Free", sung by Barby Kelly; "Mama", in which Barbara Kelly is remembered by her children; and "The Pee Pee Song", in which the common childhood issue of bedwetting is portrayed by the raucous youngest member of the family Angelo.

In the 1990s, the group enjoyed their biggest success. Their 1994 album Over the Hump sold more than 2.25 million copies in Germany alone, and 4.5 million copies throughout Europe. In 1995, to promote the album, they played a concert to a Vienna audience of 250,000. In the same year they filled the Westfalenhalle, Dortmund, nine times in a row, a feat no other musician has since accomplished. In 1996 they headlined their first stadium tour, filling some of Europe's largest venues. They played in Beijing, China in front of 20,000 people. In 1998 they bought a castle, Schloss Gymnich, on the Erft near Cologne, Germany. About the same time, Adam Kelly, son of Papa Kelly’s younger brother Henry, started performing with his cousins in The Kelly Family. Success continued until they started to disagree on a professional basis at the beginning of the year 2000. In 2002 Papa Kelly died from yet another stroke. That same year the family competed in the German Eurovision Song Contest pre-selections with the song of Maite Kelly "I Wanna Be Loved" and placed fourth.

In 2002, Barby's ongoing illness forced her retirement from the band and, to the disappointment of his fans, Paddy cut his long hair and joined a religious order in France. Members of the family continued to perform as soloists or together, or in combination with their partners, as both Jimmy and John married singers. Fan interest prompted a comeback with gigs in Germany in 2007.

In 2011, the 12 Kelly siblings were reported as living in Ireland, Germany, the United States, Spain, and Belgium.

== Controversies and issues ==
The Kelly Family has faced criticism and problems. Although singing predominantly in English, the group had little success in the English-speaking world and aroused the derision of critics. Der Spiegel called them a "singing second-hand clothes collection" and Die Zeit called them a cult.

The father, Daniel Kelly, was described, allegedly by his children, as having a "tyrannical, controlling streak". The most outspoken sibling, Jimmy, has criticized his father for not giving his children a formal education and imposing on them a "Huckleberry Finn" lifestyle. Moreover, he explained that as The Kelly Family group began to dissolve, there was almost nothing left of the millions of dollars the family had earned. The oldest daughter, Kathy, who managed most of the finances of the family, said that Daniel was more "free spirit than tyrant" but that "we got too big too fast, we should have cut things down some or handed over to professional management."

Dan Kelly taught his children to "always keep independent of the structures of the modern entertainment industry." He formed his own record label and "the Kellys kept everything in the family, from copyright and bookings to promotion and money matters."

The Kellys ran into tax issues in Germany when the "Dan Kelly Foundation" was discovered not to be a registered charity, and they were criticized for their lack of transparency in accounting for money raised for an AIDS charity.

In 2021, Angelo was fined €3,000 by German authorities after his son William performed briefly with him on-stage at an evening concert, in contravention of German labour laws which prohibit children aged under 7 from performing outside the hours of 08:00 to 17:00.

== Members ==
Name	Birth	Death (age at the time of death)	Birthplace	Notes
Daniel Jerome Sr. ("Dan")	11 October 1930	5 August 2002 (71 years)	Erie, Pennsylvania, US	Father and leader of the Kelly Family. Died, 5 August 2002, Cologne, Germany
Janice M Quint ("Joanne")	1 July 1935	December 2018 (83 years)	Peabody, Massachusetts US	
Barbara Ann	2 June 1946	10 November 1982 (36 years)	Fitchburg, Massachusetts US	"Mama" of the Kelly Family. Eight children with Dan. Died of cancer, 10 November 1982, Belascoain, Spain
Daniel Jerome Jr. ("Danny")	2 July 1958	12 November 2017 (59 years)	Chur, Graubünden Switzerland	
Caroline	20 July 1959		Leominster Massachusetts, US	
Kathleen Ann ("Kathy")	6 March 1963		Leominster, Massachusetts, US	
Paul	16 March 1964		Leominster, Massachusetts, US	
John Michael ("John")	8 March 1967		Talavera de la Reina, Spain	
Maria Patricia ("Patricia")	25 November 1969		Gamonal, Spain	
James Victor ("Jimmy")	18 February 1971		Gamonal, Spain	
Joseph Maria ("Joey")	20 December 1972		Toledo, Spain	
Barbara Ann ("Barby")	28 April 1975	15 April 2021 (45 years)	Belascoáin, Spain	Named after her mother. Left the band in 2002, due to illness; later rejoined (studio albums only). Died 15 April 2021.
Michael Patrick ("Paddy")	5 December 1977		Dublin, Ireland	He joined the Saint-John community where he was a monk, and took the name John Paul Mary. He later quit the monastery and by late 2011 had returned to music-making. On 13 April 2013 Paddy married Joelle Vereet at Ballintubber Abbey in Ireland.
Maite Star	4 December 1979		West Berlin	
Angelo Kelly	23 December 1981		Pamplona, Spain	Married to Kira (née Harms, b. 7 October 1979), has three sons and two daughters: Gabriel Jerome, Helen Josephine, Emma Maria, Joseph Ewan Gregory Walter and William Emanuel Left in 2020 to concentrate on his family band, Angelo Kelly & Family

=== Gallery ===
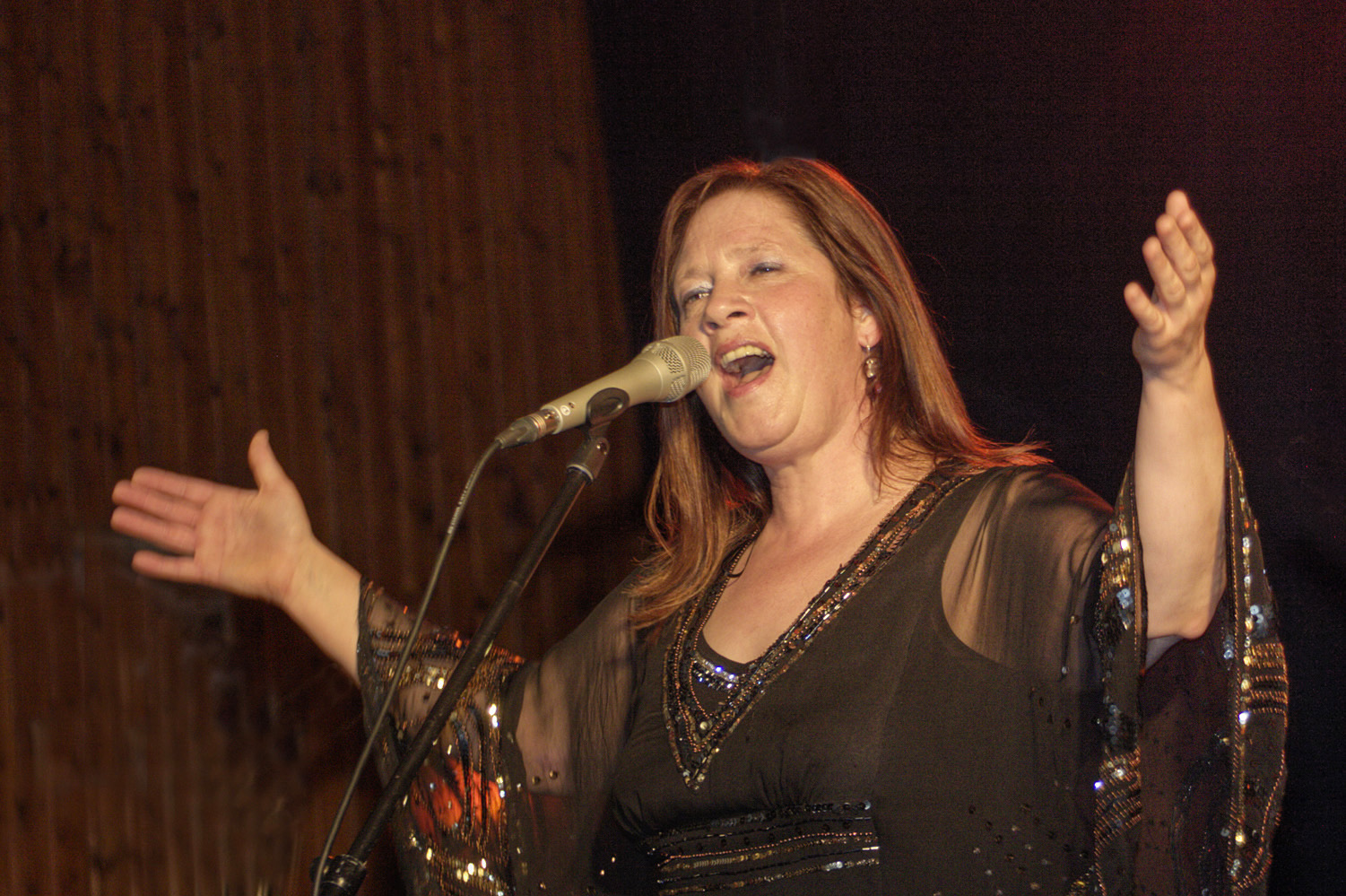
Kathy Kelly, 2010

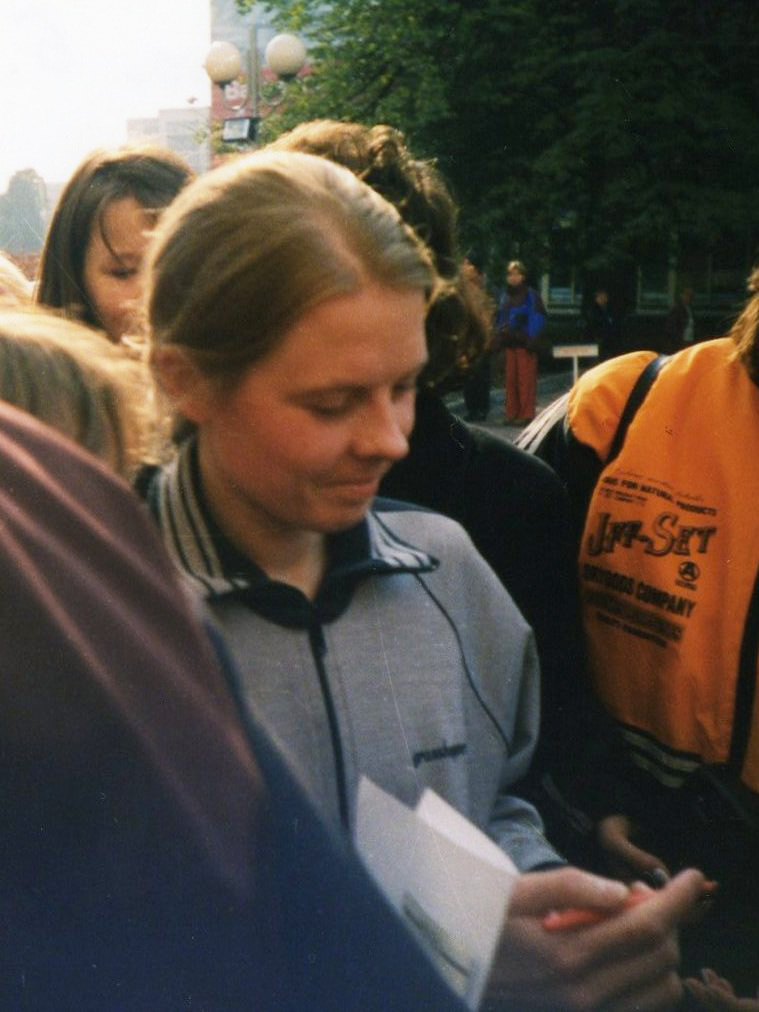
Patricia Kelly, 1997

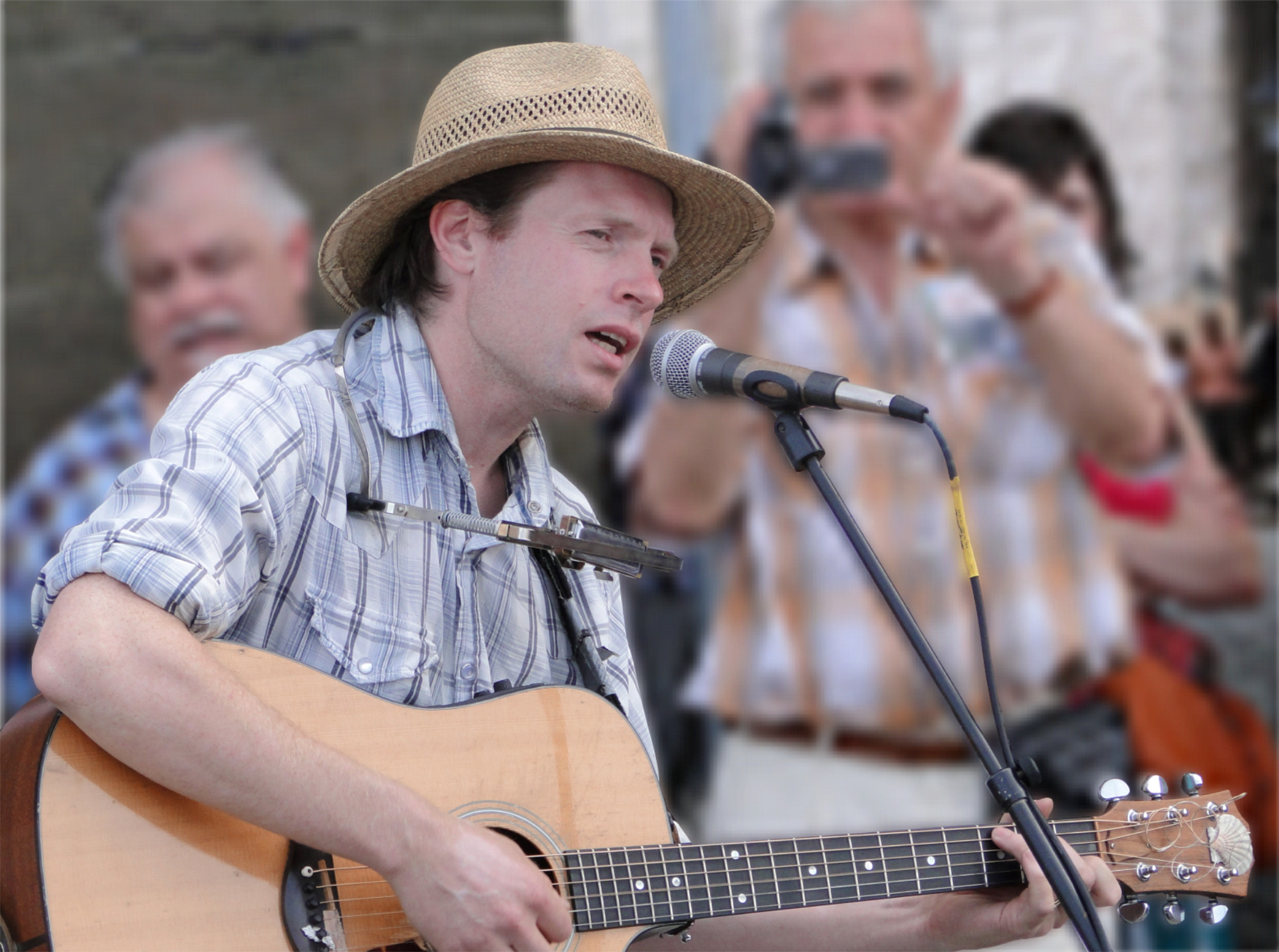
Jimmy Kelly, 2009

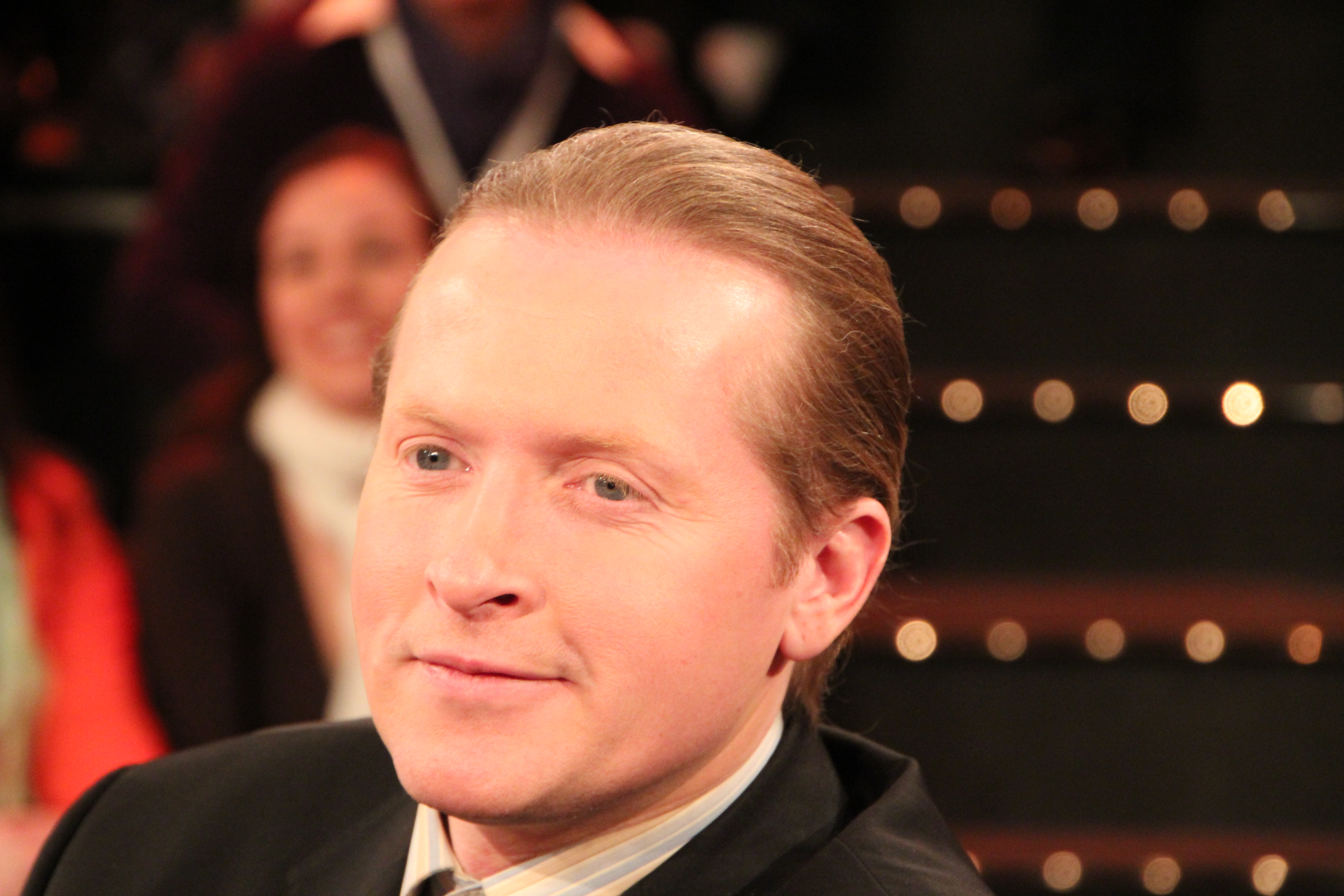
Joey Kelly, 2011

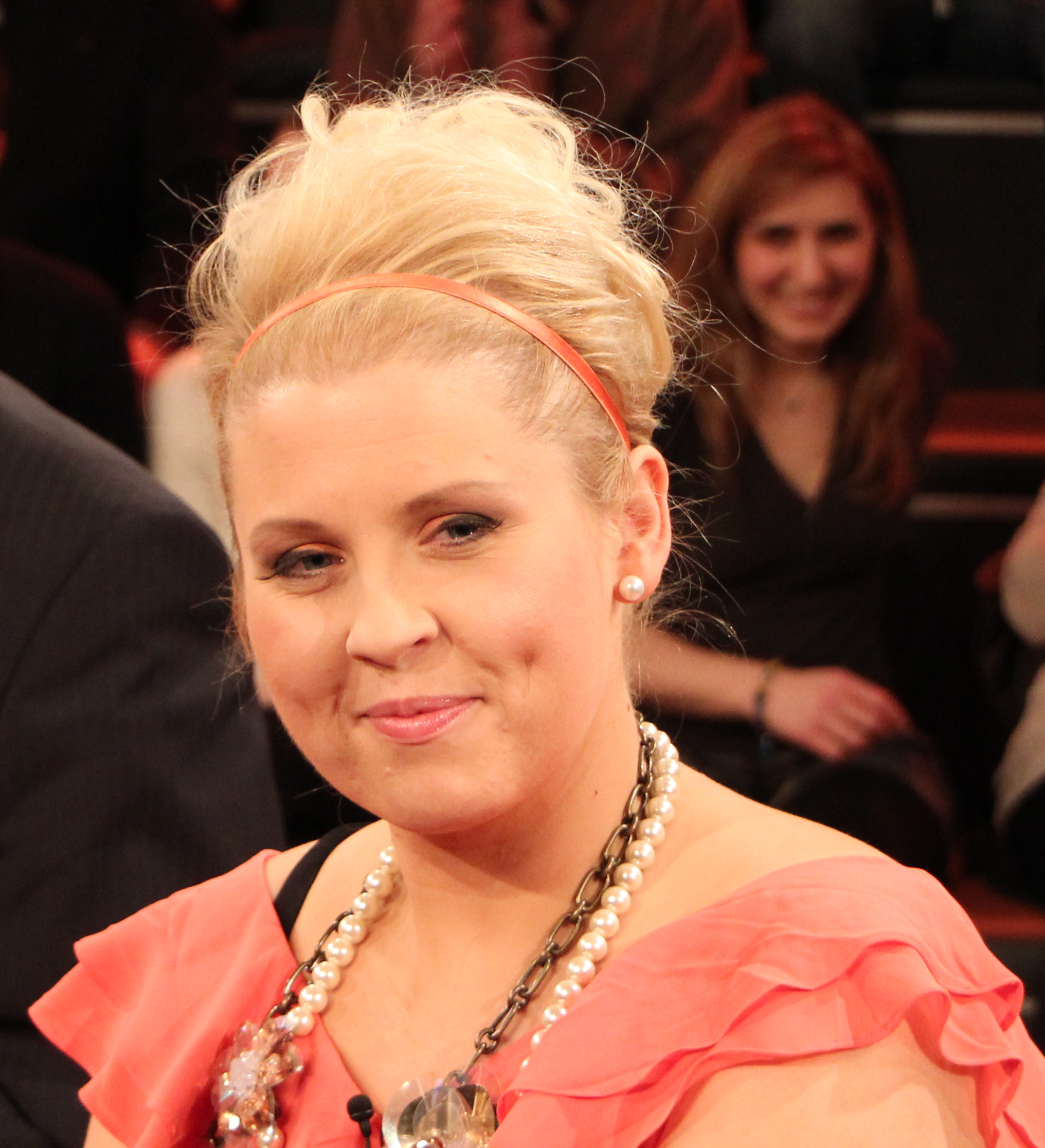
Maite Kelly, 2011

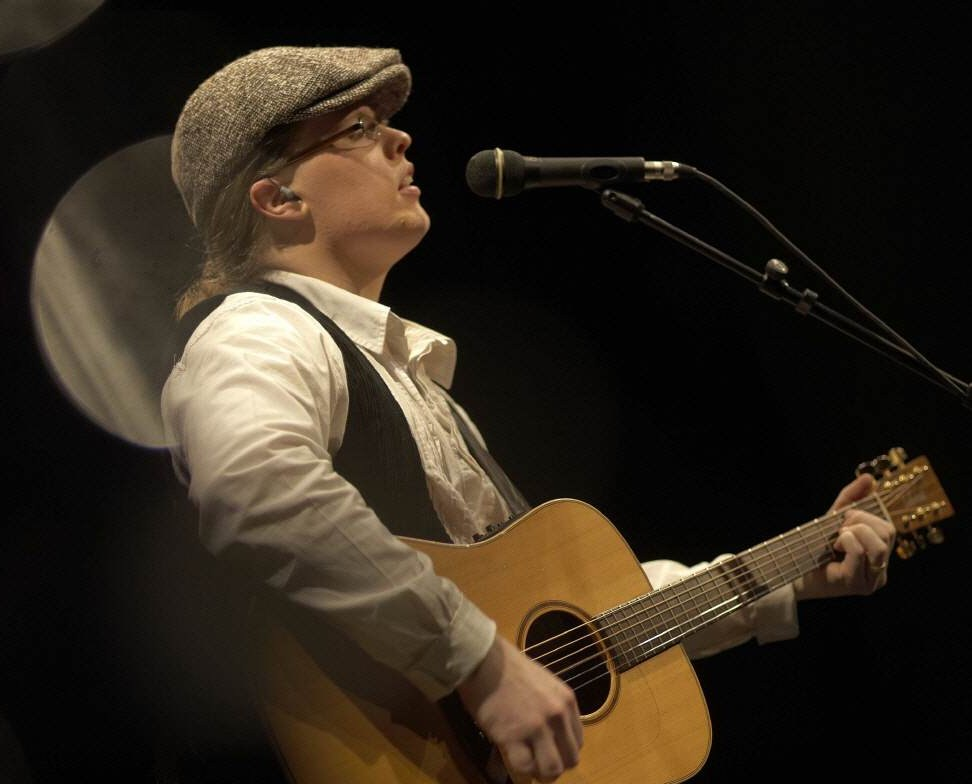
Angelo Kelly, 2009

== Discography ==
For the solo recordings of the individual members, see Solo recordings.

== Awards and nominations ==
Award	Year	Nominee(s)	Category	Result	Ref.
Echo Music Prize	1996	The Kelly Family	Best International Group	Won	
Echo Music Prize	2018	The Kelly Family	Best International Group	Nominated	
Echo Music Prize	2018	We Got Love	Album of the Year	Nominated	
Žebřík Music Awards	1996	The Kelly Family	Best International Band	Won	
Žebřík Music Awards	1997	The Kelly Family	Best International Band	Nominated	
Žebřík Music Awards	1998	The Kelly Family	Best International Band	Nominated	

== Bibliography ==
- Peter Wendling, Die Kelly Family, die Geschichte einer Supergruppe, Goldmann 1995 (German Book)
- Lisa Reinhard, Die Kelly Family und ihre Erfolge, Heyne 1995 (German Book)
