= The Voice of Germany season 9 =

Season of television series

The Voice of Germany
- Season 9
- Promotional poster featuring coaches Forster, Garvey, Merton, and Sido
- Hosted by: Thore Schölermann; Lena Gercke
- Coaches: Mark Forster; Alice Merton; Sido; Rea Garvey; Nico Santos (comeback stage)
- Winner: Claudia Emmanuela Santoso
- Winning coach: Alice Merton
- Runner-up: Erwin Kintop

Release
- Original network: ProSieben; Sat.1
- Original release: September 12 – November 10, 2019

Season chronology
- ← Previous; Season 8 Next → Season 10

The ninth season of the talent show The Voice of Germany premiered on September 12, 2019 on ProSieben and on September 15, 2019 on Sat.1. The coaches were the singer and songwriter Mark Forster returning for his third season, while songwriter and singer Rea Garvey, who last coached in the fifth season returned alongside new coaches, pop musician Alice Merton and rapper Sido, who replaced Michi & Smudo, Yvonne Catterfeld and Michael Patrick Kelly. For the first time in its history, the show featured a fifth coach, Nico Santos, who selected contestants to participate in The Voice: Comeback Stage by SEAT. Meanwhile hosts Thore Schölermann returned for his eighth season and Lena Gercke returned for her fifth season.

Claudia Emmanuela Santoso was named the winner of the season on November 10, 2019; making her the third foreigner contestant (first artist born completely outside of Europe) to win in the show's history, marking Alice Merton's first and only win. She is the first and (so far) only female coach, as well as the youngest coach to win a season of The Voice of Germany.

== Coaches and hosts ==
The Voice of Germany season 9 main coaches

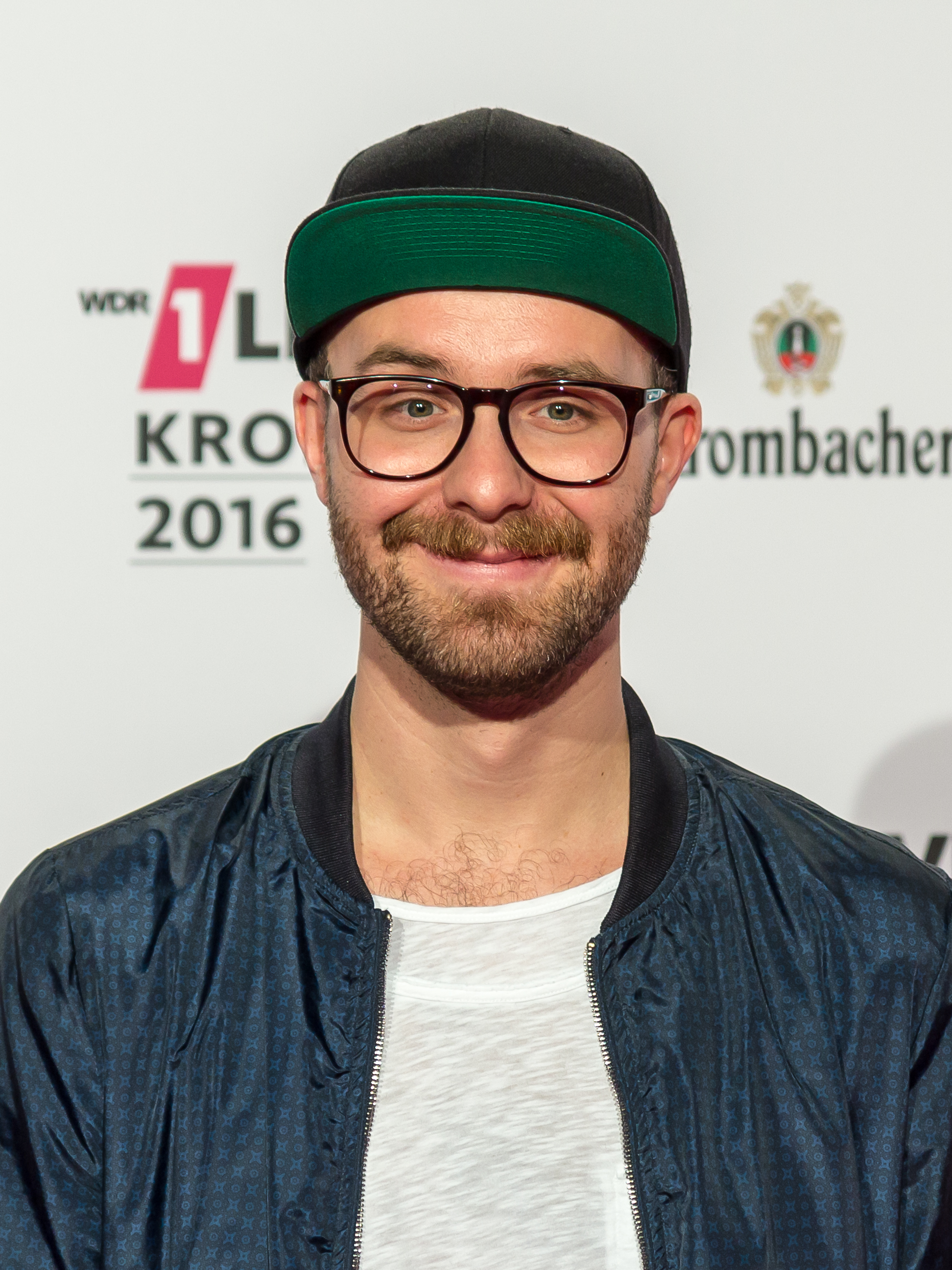
Mark Forster

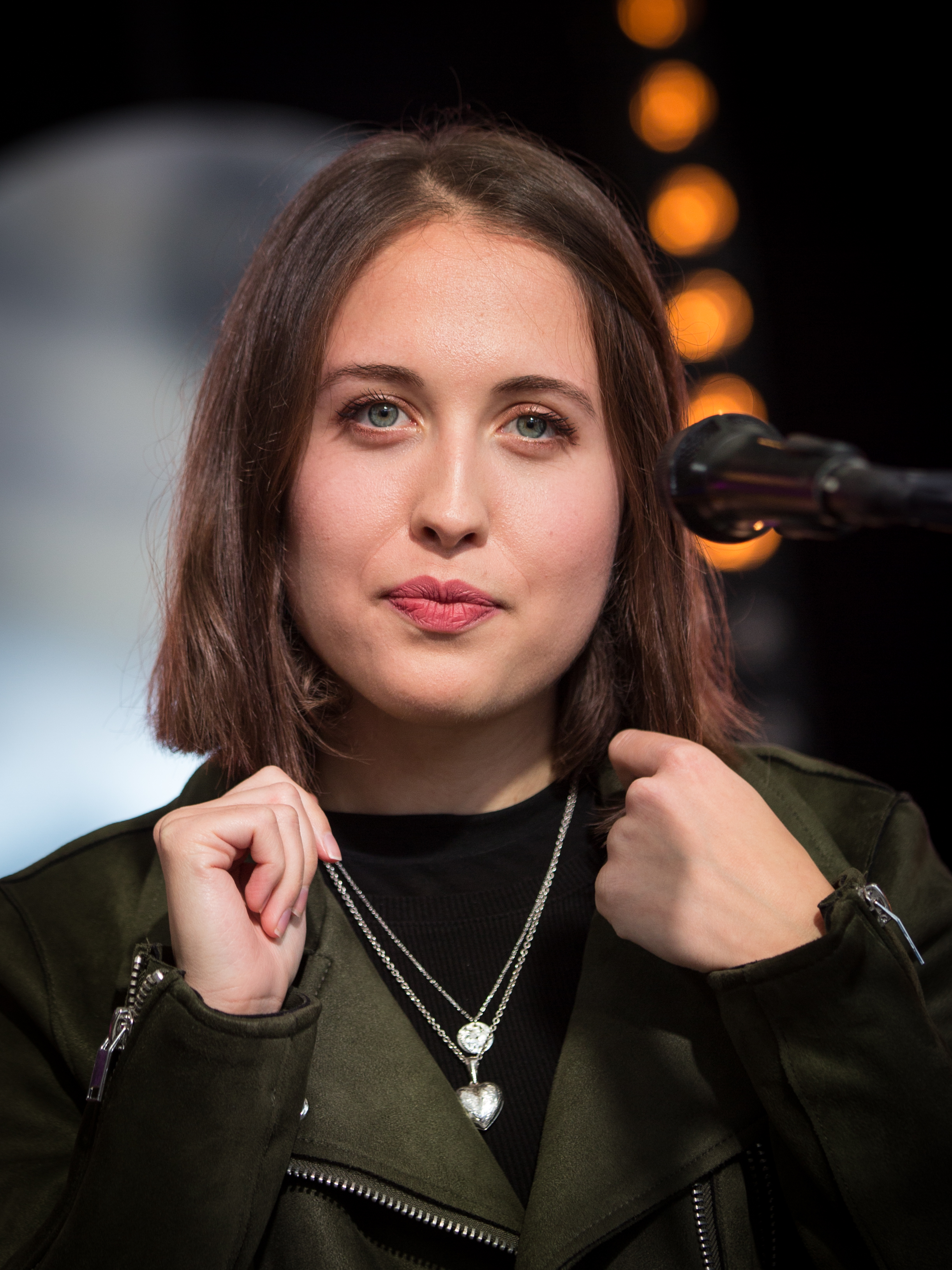
Alice Merton

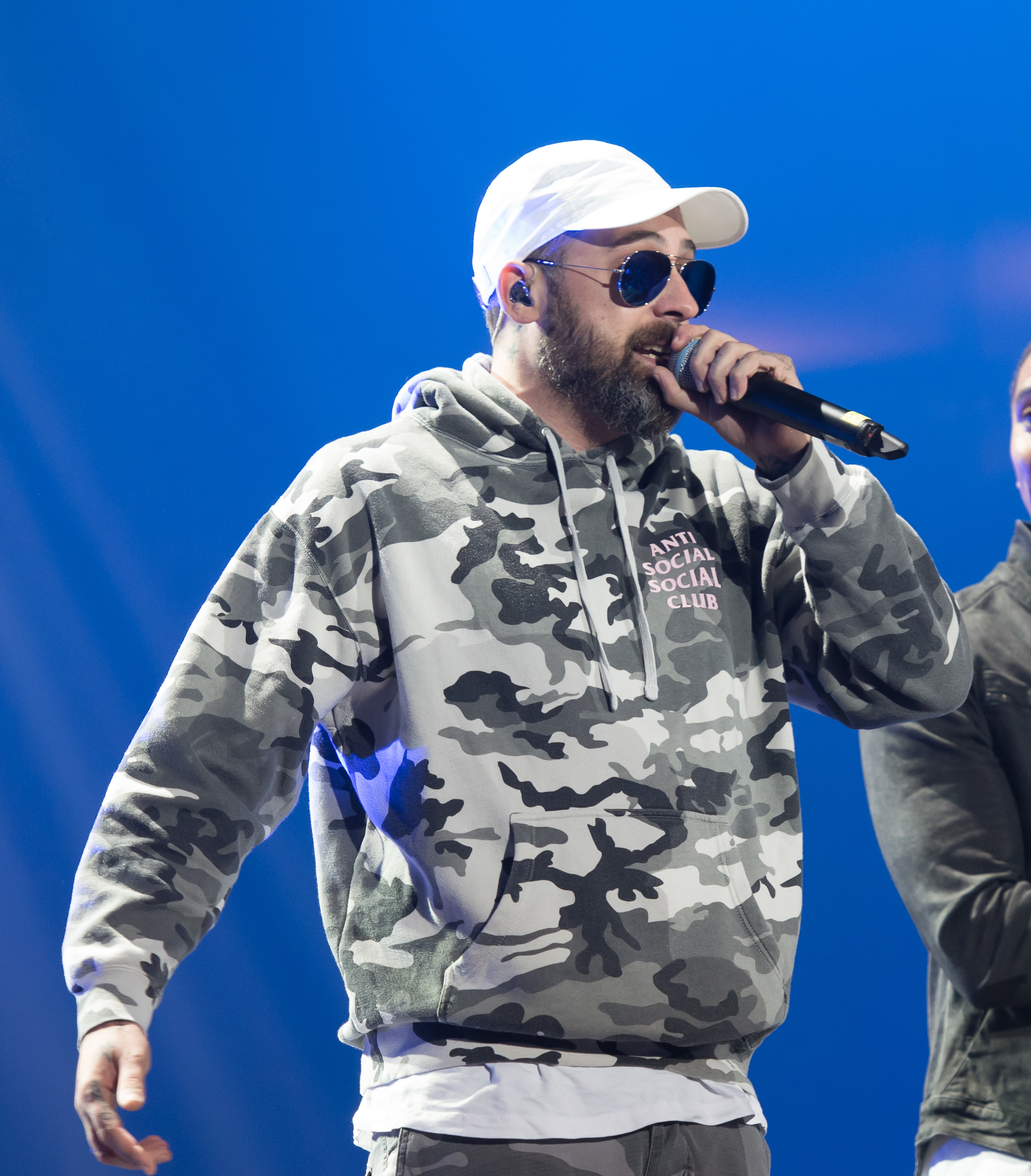
Sido

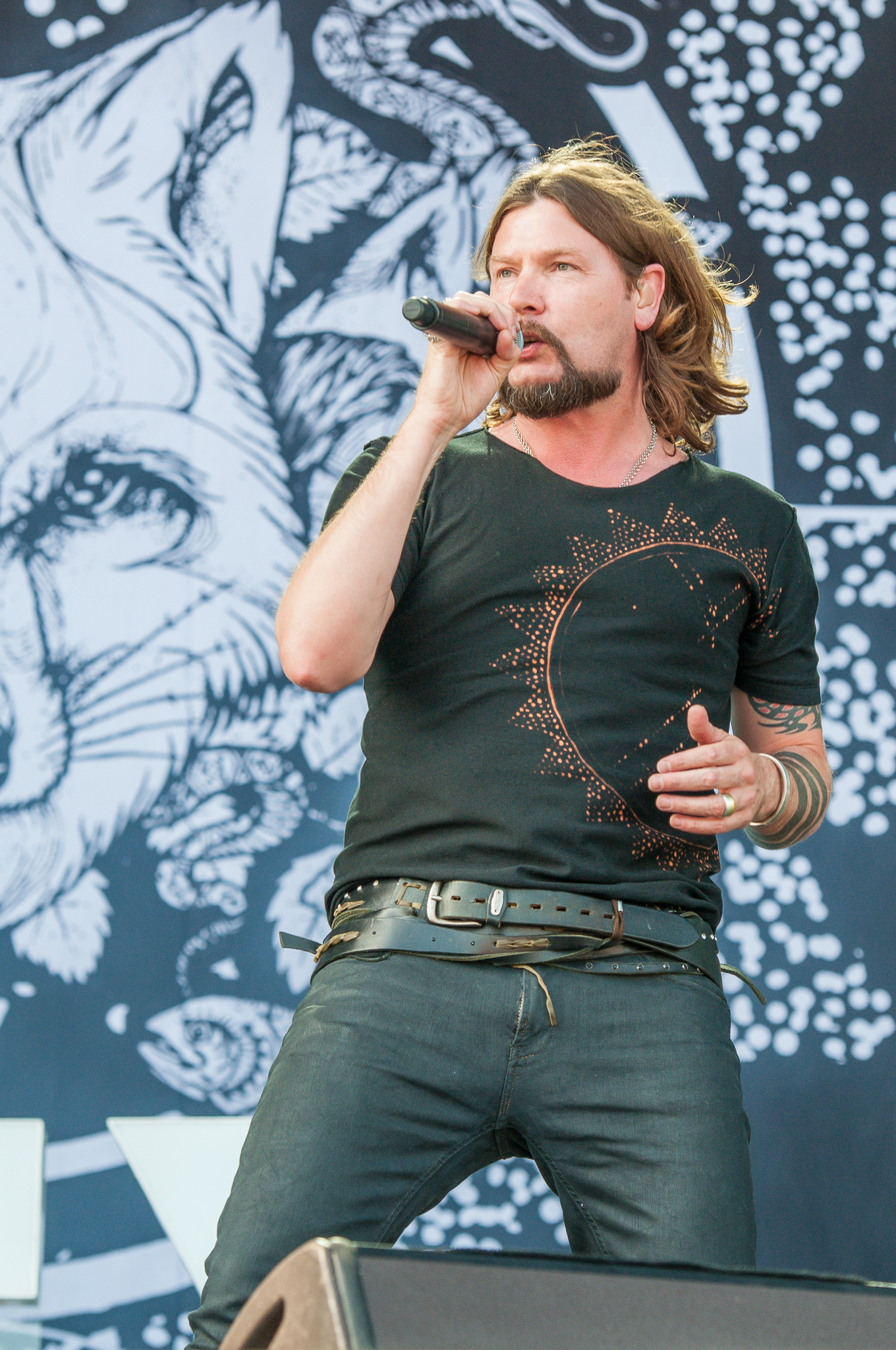
Rea Garvey

On April 7, 2019, it was announced that after 5 years Michi & Smudo would not be returning to the show. On May 6, 2019, it was announced that after 3 years Yvonne Catterfeld would not be returning as a coach, though she confirmed she would remain on The Voice Senior. On May 22, 2019, it was announced that Michael Patrick Kelly would also not be returning as a coach, instead he would be transferring to the panel of the second season of The Voice Senior. On May 26, 2019, it was announced that Rea Garvey would be returning for his fifth season after a three-year hiatus, along with new coaches Alice Merton and Sido and returning coach Mark Forster. Therefore, for the first time in the history of The Voice of Germany, there are no duo coaches on the panel. This is also the first time since season 4 to have two debuting coaches.

Thore Schölermann and Lena Gercke both remained on the show as hosts.

A new round this season, entitled "Comeback Stage by SEAT", saw artists who did not turn a chair in the Blind Auditions as well as eliminated artists from later rounds of the competition, get a second chance to return to the competition for the live shows. On August 21, 2019, it was announced that Nico Santos would become a fifth coach, mentoring unsuccessful auditioners on an online version in The Comeback Stage. The artists remained, mentored by Nico Santos, competed against each other in a digital companion series, with the winners securing a spot in the Live Shows. In addition, the number of finalists were increased from 4 to 5 this season.

== Teams ==
Main Competition

- Winner
- Runner-up
- Third place
- Fourth place
- Fifth place
- Eliminated in the Semi-final
- Eliminated but selected to participate in Comeback Stage
- Eliminated in the Sing Off
- Stolen in the Battle rounds
- Eliminated in the Battle rounds or stolen and later eliminated

Comeback Stage

- Eliminated in the Finals
- Eliminated in the Third rounds
- Eliminated in the Second rounds
- Eliminated in the First rounds

Coach	Top 81 Artists				
Mark Forster					
Mark Forster	Fidi Steinbeck	Oxa	Maciek	David Maresch	Farman Isajew
Mark Forster	Anika Loffhagen	Nastja Isabella Zahour	Tori Roe	Jannik Föste	Stefanie Stuber
Mark Forster	~~Jo Marie Dominiak~~	Sally Haas	Siar Yildiz	Sophie-Charlotte Lewing	Judith Jensen
Mark Forster	Janet Gizaw	Dalja Heiniger	Jenny Rizzo	Sabina Noronha	Saenab Sahabuddin
Mark Forster	Veronika Twerdy	Mark Agpas^{1}	Jean-Baptiste Eumann	Lukas Linder	Julian Mauro
Alice Merton					
Alice Merton	Claudia Emmanuela Santoso	Mariel Kirschall	Herculano Marques	Marie Weiss	Nicolas Granados
Alice Merton	Chiara Autenrieth	Frederic Dorra	Noemi Treude	Luke Voigtmann	Bastian Springer
Alice Merton	Linus Hemker	~~Sally Haas~~	~~Lucie Patt~~	~~Patrick Rust~~	~~Judith Jensen~~
Alice Merton	Chiara Alessia Innamorato	Maria Nissen	Emma & Felix Kohlhoff	Barbara Kabangu	Ann-Christin Klos
Alice Merton	Kaan Bülte				
Sido					
Sido	Freschta Akbarzada	Larissa Pitzen	Lucas Rieger	Phillip & Danny	Katja Wiegand
Sido	Selina Schulz	Giulia Grimaudo	Denis Henning	Veronika Rzasa	~~Bastian Springer~~
Sido	~~Siar Yildiz~~	~~Sophie-Charlotte Lewing~~	~~Tyrone Frank~~	~~Janet Gizaw~~	~~Chiara Alessia Innamorato~~
Sido	Amanda Braga Gomes Torrado	Jo Marie Dominiak	Ina Freund	Princess Igbokwe	Madline Wittenbrink
Sido	Seyran Ismayilkhanov				
Rea Garvey					
Rea Garvey	Erwin Kintop	Marita Hintz	Niklas Schregel	Andrew Telles	Christian Haas
Rea Garvey	Lucie Patt	Anri Coza	Lea Herdt	Jakob Rauno	Anna Strohmayr
Rea Garvey	Philipp Fixmer	~~Nastja Isabella Zahour~~	~~Giulia Grimaudo~~	Patrick Rust	Tyrone Frank
Rea Garvey	Rebecca Selje	Simona Steinemann	Oliver Frauenrath	Madeline Henning	Allan Garnelis
Rea Garvey	Marvin Merkhofer				
Nico Santos					
Nico Santos	Lucas Rieger	Celine Abeling	Niklas Schregel	Philipp Fixmer	Linus Hemker
Nico Santos	Tina Trummer	Bastian Stein	Heidi & Martin Bordt	Jan-Luca Ernst	Dario Denegri
Note: Italicized names are stolen artists (names struck through within former teams). The Grey names are eliminated artists selected to participate in Comeback Stage and the Underlined name is its winner who advanced in the Live Shows.

== Blind auditions ==
The auditions for the ninth season took place from February 2019 to March 2019 but not shown on television. The blind auditions were recorded from June 7, 2019 to June 12, 2019 at Studio Adlershof in Berlin and were broadcast from September 12, 2019 until October 10, 2019, being broadcast every Thursday on ProSieben and every Sunday on Sat.1.

Color key

✔	Coach hit his/her "I WANT YOU" button
✔	Coach hit his/her "I WANT YOU" button, despite the lack of places in his/her team
	Artist defaulted to this coach's team
	Artist elected to join this coach's team
	Artist was eliminated and was not invited back for "Comeback Stage"
	Artist was eliminated, but got a second chance to compete in "Comeback Stage"

=== Episode 1 (September 12) ===
The first blind audition episode was broadcast on September 12, 2019 on ProSieben.

- Coaches Performance: Alice Merton: "No Roots", Sido: "Tausend Tattoos", Rea Garvey: "Is It Love", Mark Forster: "Chöre"

Order	Artist	Age	Song	Coach's and artist's choices			
Order	Artist	Age	Song	Mark	Alice	Sido	Rea
1	Marita Hintz	17	"Don't Watch Me Cry"	✔	✔	✔	✔
2	Lucas Rieger	18	"Got My Mojo Working"	✔	–	✔	–
3	Lucie Patt	21	"Lost Boy"	✔	✔	–	–
4	Philipp Patt	24	"Let Me Down Slowly"	–	–	–	–
5	Stefanie Stuber	23	"Ghost Walking"	✔	✔	✔	✔
6	Freddy Kaps	25	"Bis ans Ende der Welt"	–	–	–	–
7	Veronika Rzasa	27	"Chandelier"	✔	–	✔	✔
8	Tina Trummer	36	"Hands Clean"	–	–	–	–
9	Roman Rupp, Julian Sirowatka & Julian Koch	27/28/26	"Believer"	–	–	–	–
10	Claudia Emmanuela Santoso	18	"Never Enough"	✔	✔	✔	✔

=== Episode 2 (September 15) ===
The second blind audition episode was broadcast on September 15, 2019 on Sat.1.

Order	Artist	Age	Song	Coach's and artist's choices			
Order	Artist	Age	Song	Mark	Alice	Sido	Rea
1	Noemi Treude	25	"One Day / Reckoning Song"	✔	✔	–	–
2	Tyrone Frank	22	"Mockingbird"	✔	✔	✔	✔
3	Alexander Borges	31	"Herz über Kopf"	–	–	–	–
4	Jo Marie Dominiak	23	"Bonnie & Clyde"	✔	–	✔	✔
5	Dario Denegri	23	"There's Nothing Holdin' Me Back"	–	–	–	–
6	Anika Loffhagen	39	"Shallow"	✔	✔	✔	✔
7	Christian Haas	53	"Killing in the Name"	✔	–	–	✔
8	Laura Artmann	28	"New Rules"	–	–	–	–
9	Frederic Dorra	16	"Für immer ab jetzt"	✔	✔	–	✔
10	Ina Freund	27	"Church Bells"	✔	–	✔	–
11	Niklas Cremerius	27	"Hello"	–	–	–	–
12	Niklas Schregel	25	"Scars"	✔	✔	✔	✔

=== Episode 3 (September 19) ===
The third blind audition episode was broadcast on September 19, 2019 on ProSieben.

Order	Artist	Age	Song	Coach's and artist's choices			
Order	Artist	Age	Song	Mark	Alice	Sido	Rea
1	Stiletto Stohl	53	"You Shook Me All Night Long"	–	–	–	–
2	Philipp Fixmer	20	"Power Over Me"	✔	✔	✔	✔
3	Sally Haas	19	"Riptide"	✔	✔	–	–
4	Janina Mahnken	30	"Raise Your Glass"	–	–	–	–
5	Denis Henning	36	"Love Someone"	✔	✔	✔	–
6	Angelo Nastro & Andre Heller	39/40	"Hür niemols op ze singe"	–	–	–	–
7	Oxa	29	"Toy"	✔	–	–	–
8	Erwin Kintop	23	"You Deserve Better"	✔	✔	✔	✔
9	Selina Schulz	20	"OG Luv Kush Pt. 2"	–	–	✔	✔
10	Sandra Siebert	38	"Open Your Eyes"	–	–	–	–
11	Linus Hemker	20	"Someone You Loved"	✔	✔	–	✔
12	Fidi Steinbeck	34	"Durch den Sturm"	✔	✔	✔	✔

=== Episode 4 (September 22) ===
The fourth blind audition episode was broadcast on September 22, 2019 on Sat.1.

Order	Artist	Age	Song	Coach's and artist's choices			
Order	Artist	Age	Song	Mark	Alice	Sido	Rea
1	Madeline Henning	30	"One and Only"	✔	✔	✔	✔
2	Farman Isajew	24	"Fantasie Part 1"	✔	✔	✔	✔
3	Max Grubmüller	38	"Dancing in the Dark"	–	–	–	–
4	Nastja Isabella Zahour	24	"Sax"	–	✔	–	✔
5	Jannik Föste	29	"Flash mich"	✔	✔	✔	–
6	Adrian Buljat	35	"Wenn das Liebe ist"	–	–	–	–
7	Kaan Bülte	28	"Loving You"	–	✔	–	–
8	Celine Abeling	22	"An guten Tagen"	–	–	–	–
9	Veronika Twerdy	32	"Dynamite"	✔	–	–	✔
10	Marvin Merkhofer	26	"My Hero"	–	–	✔	✔
11	Freschta Akbarzada	23	"I Look to You"	✔	✔	✔	✔

=== Episode 5 (September 26) ===
The fifth blind audition episode was broadcast on September 26, 2019 on ProSieben.

Order	Artist	Age	Song	Coach's and artist's choices			
Order	Artist	Age	Song	Mark	Alice	Sido	Rea
1	Lea Herdt	19	"Sunday Morning"	✔	–	✔	✔
2	Phillip & Danny	23/27	"Deine Mutter"	✔	–	✔	–
3	Can Sisamci	17	"Kartenhaus"	–	–	–	–
4	Maria Nissen	28	"I'd Do Anything for Love (But I Won't Do That)"	✔	✔	–	–
5	Seyran Ismayilkhanov	39	"Aya Benzer"	✔	✔	✔	✔
6	Jenny Rizzo	33	"Always"	✔	–	–	–
7	Jan-Luca Ernst	20	"Last Resort"	–	–	–	–
8	Marie Weiss	24	"Halt mich"	✔	✔	✔	✔
9	Janina Hirch	22	"Mother's Heart"	–	–	–	–
10	Tino Standhaft	56	"The Needle and the Damage Done"	–	–	–	–
11	Maciek	26	"Hey Ya!"	✔	–	✔	✔
12	Anna Strohmayr	22	"Nothing Compares 2 U"	✔	✔	✔	✔

=== Episode 6 (September 29) ===
The sixth blind audition episode was broadcast on September 29, 2019 on Sat.1.

Order	Artist	Age	Song	Coach's and artist's choices			
Order	Artist	Age	Song	Mark	Alice	Sido	Rea
1	Ann-Christin Klos	27	"Came Here for Love"	–	✔	–	–
2	Bastian Stein	16	"Nur bei dir bin ich sicher"	–	–	–	–
3	Andrew Telles	36	"Tennessee Whiskey"	✔	✔	✔	✔
4	Giulia Grimaudo	19	"Hiding My Heart"	✔	✔	–	✔
5	Madline Wittenbrink	30	"Like the Way I Do"	✔	–	✔	–
6	Barbara Alli	37	"Fever"	–	–	–	–
7	Emma & Felix Kohlhoff	20/24	"Falling Slowly"	✔	✔	–	–
8	Dalja Heiniger	20	"Sie ist weg"	✔	–	–	✔
9	Dominik Wrobel	25	"Join Me"	–	–	–	–
10	Katja Wiegand	38	"Bilder von dir"	✔	✔	✔	–
11	Jakob Rauno	23	"Zuhause"	–	–	✔	✔
12	Ayla Rönisch	17	"Daddy's Little Girl"	–	–	–	–
13	Tori Roe	23	"Take Me to Church"	✔	✔	✔	✔

=== Episode 7 (October 3) ===
The seventh blind audition episode was broadcast on October 3, 2019 on ProSieben.

Order	Artist	Age	Song	Coach's and artist's choices			
Order	Artist	Age	Song	Mark	Alice	Sido	Rea
1	Nicolas Granados	18	"Latch"	✔	✔	✔	✔
2	Chiara Alessia Innamorato	23	"I'll Fight"	✔	–	✔	–
3	Patrick Bulluck	28	"Jack's Lament"	–	–	–	–
4	Amanda Braga Gomes Torrado	27	"All the Things She Said"	–	–	✔	–
5	Allan Garnelis	41	"This Is the Last Time"	–	✔	–	✔
6	Anthony Utama	30	"Pieces"	–	–	–	–
7	Chiara Autenrieth	20	"Yours"	✔	✔	✔	–
8	Heidi & Martin Bordt	26/22	"Bis meine Welt die Augen schliesst"	–	–	–	–
9	Jean-Baptiste Eumann	25	"Eisberg"	✔	–	–	–
10	Anri Coza	46	"Run to You"	✔	–	–	✔
11	Nora Tushi	19	"Without Me"	–	–	–	–
12	David Maresch	19	"Mit jedem deiner Fehler"	✔	✔	✔	✔

=== Episode 8 (October 6) ===
The eighth blind audition episode was broadcast on October 6, 2019 on Sat.1.

Order	Artist	Age	Song	Coach's and artist's choices			
Order	Artist	Age	Song	Mark	Alice	Sido	Rea
1	Barbara Kabangu	20	"Dancing with a Stranger"	–	✔	–	–
2	Nina Jansen	36	"Wir beide"	–	–	–	–
3	Bastian Springer	21	"No Matter What"	✔	–	✔	–
4	Simona Steinemann	42	"Hunting High and Low"	✔	–	–	✔
5	Luke Voigtmann	22	"Why Georgia"	✔	✔	–	–
6	Siar Yildiz	19	"Sweet but Psycho"	–	✔	✔	–
7	Judith Jensen	22	"Steine"	✔	✔	✔	✔
8	Sabina Noronha	29	"I'll Never Love Again"	✔	–	–	–
9	Charnée Drake	33	"Before He Cheats"	–	–	–	–
10	Lukas Linder	26	"Heute hier, morgen dort"	✔	✔	✔	–
11	Domenico Antonio Straface	24	"Musica è"	–	–	–	–

=== Episode 9 (October 10) ===
The ninth and final blind audition episode was broadcast on October 10, 2019 on ProSieben.

Order	Artist	Age	Song	Coach's and artist's choices			
Order	Artist	Age	Song	Mark	Alice	Sido	Rea
1	Sophie-Charlotte Lewing	19	"Jailhouse Rock"	–	✔	✔	–
2	Oliver Frauenrath	19	"Frische Luft"	–	–	–	✔
3	Saenab Sahabuddin	40	"How Do I Live"	✔	–	✔	–
4	Fabian Haugg	26	"Hold My Girl"	–	–	–	–
5	Larissa Pitzen	23	"Still Got the Blues (For You)"	–	–	✔	–
6	Herculano Marques	48	"Song Sung Blue"	✔	✔	–	–
7	Rebecca Selje	22	"Suitcase"	–	✔	–	✔
8	Benjamin Eberling	39	"Probier's mal mit Gemütlichkeit"	–	–	–	–
9	Patrick Rust	27	"Somebody Like You"	–	✔	–	–
10	Janet Gizaw	28	"Dance with My Father"	–	✔	✔	–
11	Mariel Kirschall	16	"Desperado"	✔	✔	Team full	–
12	Liza Anthimidou	35	"Ohne Dich"	–	Team full	Team full	–
13	Julian Mauro	24	"Was du Liebe nennst"	✔	Team full	Team full	–
14	Princess Igbokwe	23	"American Boy"	✔	Team full	✔	–

== Battle rounds ==
The battle rounds were recorded from August 5, 2019 to August 7, 2019 in Berlin and were broadcast from October 13, 2019 until October 24, 2019, being broadcast like the blind auditions every Thursday on ProSieben and every Sunday on Sat.1.

The coaches can steal one losing artist from other coaches. Contestants who win their battle or are stolen by another coach will advance to the Sing-off. New to this season, is the introduction of the Steal Room. While steals have returned, each artist that is stolen this season will sit in a designated seat in the Steal Room as they watch the other performances. If a coach has stolen one artist but later decides to steal another, the first artist will be replaced and eliminated by the newly-stolen artist.

Color key

Artist won the Battle and advanced to the Sing-offs
Artist lost the Battle but was stolen by another coach and advances to the Sing-offs
Artist lost the Battle and was stolen by another coach, but was later switched with another artist and eliminated
Artist lost the Battle but got a second chance to compete in "Comeback Stage"
Artist lost the Battle and was eliminated

Episode	Coach	Order	Winner	Song	Loser	'Steal' result			
Episode	Coach	Order	Winner	Song	Loser	Mark	Alice	Sido	Rea
Episode 10 (October 13)	Rea	1	Christian Haas	"Careless Whisper"	Marvin Merkofer	–	–	–	—N/a
Episode 10 (October 13)	Mark	2	Maciek	"I Don't Care"	Julian Mauro	—N/a	–	–	–
Episode 10 (October 13)	Sido	3	Freschta Akbarzada	"When We Were Young"	Chiara Alessia Innamorato	–	✔	—N/a	✔
Episode 10 (October 13)	Alice	4	Luke Voigtmann	"...Baby One More Time"	Kaan Bülte	–	—N/a	–	–
Episode 10 (October 13)	Sido	5	N/A^{2}	"What's My Name?"	Tyrone Frank	–	✔	—N/a	✔
Episode 10 (October 13)	Sido	5	N/A^{2}	"What's My Name?"	Janet Gizaw	✔	–	—N/a	–
Episode 10 (October 13)	Rea	6	Andrew Telles	"Little Lion Man"	Allan Garnelis	–	–	–	—N/a
Episode 10 (October 13)	Alice	7	Marie Weiss	"Alles neu"	Judith Jensen	✔	—N/a	–	–
Episode 10 (October 13)	Mark	8	Fidi Steinbeck	"Flugzeuge im Bauch"	Lukas Linder	—N/a	–	–	–
Episode 11 (October 17)	Sido	1	Lucas Rieger	"Everybody Needs Somebody to Love"	Sophie-Charlotte Lewing	✔	–	—N/a	–
Episode 11 (October 17)	Mark	2	Jannik Föste	"Leiser"	Jo Marie Dominiak	—N/a	–	✔	–
Episode 11 (October 17)	Mark	2	Jannik Föste	"Leiser"	Jean-Baptiste Eumann	—N/a	–	–	–
Episode 11 (October 17)	Alice	3	Mariel Kirschall	"Daddy Lessons"	Patrick Rust	–	—N/a	–	✔
Episode 11 (October 17)	Sido	4	Phillip & Danny	"Geboren um frei zu sein"	Siar Yildiz	✔	–	—N/a	–
Episode 11 (October 17)	Rea	5	Anna Strohmayr	"Beautiful"	Madeline Henning	–	–	–	—N/a
Episode 11 (October 17)	Mark	6	Stefanie Stuber	"Crawling"	Mark Agpas	—N/a	–	–	–
Episode 11 (October 17)	Sido	7	Denis Henning	"Too Good at Goodbyes"	Bastian Springer	–	✔	—N/a	✔
Episode 11 (October 17)	Alice	8	Nicolas Granados	"Me!"	Ann-Christin Klos	–	—N/a	–	–
Episode 11 (October 17)	Rea	9	Jakob Rauno	"Pocahontas"	Philipp Fixmer	–	–	–	—N/a
Episode 12 (October 20)	Rea	1	Marita Hintz	"Skin"	Giulia Grimaudo	✔	–	✔	—N/a
Episode 12 (October 20)	Mark	2	David Maresch	"Lovely"	Veronika Twerdy	—N/a	–	–	–
Episode 12 (October 20)	Sido	3	Veronika Rzasa	"Somebody That I Used to Know"	Seyran Ismayilkhanov	–	–	—N/a	–
Episode 12 (October 20)	Sido	3	Veronika Rzasa	"Somebody That I Used to Know"	Amanda Braga Gomes Torrado	–	–	—N/a	–
Episode 12 (October 20)	Alice	4	Chiara Autenrieth	"I Try"	Lucie Patt	✔	—N/a	✔	✔
Episode 12 (October 20)	Mark	5	Tori Roe	"River"	Saenab Sahabuddin	—N/a	–	–	–
Episode 12 (October 20)	Rea	6	Niklas Schregel	"Hold Me While You Wait"	Oliver Frauenrath	–	–	–	—N/a
Episode 12 (October 20)	Alice	7	Noemi Treude	"You Found Me"	Linus Hemker	–	—N/a	–	–
Episode 12 (October 20)	Sido	8	Larissa Pitzen	"Dog Days Are Over"	Madline Wittenbrink	–	–	—N/a	–
Episode 12 (October 20)	Alice	9	Frederic Dorra	"No Air"	Sally Haas	✔	—N/a	–	–
Episode 12 (October 20)	Alice	9	Frederic Dorra	"No Air"	Barbara Kabangu	–	—N/a	–	–
Episode 13 (October 24)	Mark	1	Oxa	"Don't Stop Me Now"	Sabina Noronha	—N/a	–	–	–
Episode 13 (October 24)	Rea	2	Anri Coza	"Apologize"	Simona Steinemann	–	–	–	—N/a
Episode 13 (October 24)	Sido	3	Selina Schulz	"Unpretty"	Princess Igbokwe	–	–	—N/a	–
Episode 13 (October 24)	Alice	4	Claudia Emmanuela Santoso	"Say Something"	Emma & Felix Kohlhoff	–	—N/a	–	–
Episode 13 (October 24)	Mark	5	Anika Loffhagen	"Iris"	Jenny Rizzo	—N/a	–	–	–
Episode 13 (October 24)	Rea	6	Lea Herdt	"Wonderwall"	Rebecca Selje	–	–	–	—N/a
Episode 13 (October 24)	Mark	7	Farman Isajew	"Vermissen"	Dalja Heiniger	—N/a	–	–	–
Episode 13 (October 24)	Sido	8	Katja Wiegand	"Lost on You"	Ina Freund	–	–	—N/a	–
Episode 13 (October 24)	Alice	9	Herculano Marques	"Young and Beautiful"	Maria Nissen	–	—N/a	–	–
Episode 13 (October 24)	Rea	10	Erwin Kintop	"Never Really Over"	Nastja Isabella Zahour	✔	–	✔	—N/a

1. Coach Sido didn't pick a winner, because he thought both artists didn't manage to listen to his instructions.

== Sing offs ==
The sing offs were recorded in Berlin from September 10, 2019 to September 11, 2019 and were broadcast in two episodes on October 27, 2019 on Sat.1 and on October 31, 2019 on ProSieben. This season's advisors were Natasha Bedingfield for Team Mark, Ryan Tedder for Team Alice, James Blunt for Team Sido and Michael Schulte for Team Rea.

The Sing Off determines which two artists from each team will advance to the final round of competition, the Live Shows. In this round, after an artist performs, he or she will sit in one of two hot-seats above the stage. The first two artists performing from each team will sit down, but once the third artist performs, a coach has the choice of replacing the third artist with any artist sitting down or eliminating them immediately. Once all artists have performed, those who remain seated will advance to the Live Shows.

Color key

Artist was immediately eliminated after performance without given a chair
Artist was given a chair but swapped out later in the competition and eventually eliminated
Artist was given a chair and made the final two of their own team
Artist lost the Sing Off but got a second chance to compete in "Comeback Stage"

Episode	Coach	Order	Artist	Song	Coach's decision	Switched with
Episode 14 (October 27)	Alice	1	Nicolas Granados	"If I Can't Have You"	Put in Hot-seat 1	
Episode 14 (October 27)	Alice	2	Noemi Treude	"Higher Love"	Put in Hot-seat 2	
Episode 14 (October 27)	Alice	3	Luke Voigtmann	"Rude"	Eliminated	–
Episode 14 (October 27)	Alice	4	Bastian Springer	"Come Home"	Put in Hot-seat 1	Nicolas Granados
Episode 14 (October 27)	Alice	5	Chiara Autenrieth	"Castles"	Put in Hot-seat 2	Noemi Treude
Episode 14 (October 27)	Alice	6	Frederic Dorra	"Durch die schweren Zeiten"	Eliminated	–
Episode 14 (October 27)	Alice	7	Mariel Kirschall	"Wicked Game"	Put in Hot-seat 2	Chiara Autenrieth
Episode 14 (October 27)	Alice	8	Marie Weiss	"Wir waren hier"	Eliminated	–
Episode 14 (October 27)	Alice	9	Herculano Marques	"Moon River"	Eliminated	–
Episode 14 (October 27)	Alice	10	Claudia Emmanuela Santoso	"Run"	Put in Hot-seat 1	Bastian Springer
Episode 14 (October 27)	Mark	1	Jannik Föste	"Kreise"	Put in Hot-seat 1	
Episode 14 (October 27)	Mark	2	Nastja Isabella Zahour	"Bang Bang"	Put in Hot-seat 2	
Episode 14 (October 27)	Mark	3	Stefanie Stuber	"Broken"	Eliminated	–
Episode 14 (October 27)	Mark	4	Maciek	"No One"	Put in Hot-seat 1	Jannik Föste
Episode 14 (October 27)	Mark	5	Tori Roe	"Smells Like Teen Spirit"	Eliminated	–
Episode 14 (October 27)	Mark	6	Fidi Steinbeck	"Lila Wolken"	Put in Hot-seat 2	Nastja Isabella Zahour
Episode 14 (October 27)	Mark	7	Anika Loffhagen	"I Don't Believe You"	Eliminated	–
Episode 14 (October 27)	Mark	8	Farman Isajew	"River"	Eliminated	–
Episode 14 (October 27)	Mark	9	David Maresch	"The Sound of Silence"	Eliminated	–
Episode 14 (October 27)	Mark	10	Oxa	"Born This Way"	Put in Hot-seat 1	Maciek
Episode 15 (October 31)	Sido	1	Larissa Pitzen	"Alarm"	Put in Hot-seat 1	
Episode 15 (October 31)	Sido	2	Denis Henning	"How Will I Know"	Put in Hot-seat 2	
Episode 15 (October 31)	Sido	3	Veronika Rzasa	"The Greatest"	Eliminated	–
Episode 15 (October 31)	Sido	4	Giulia Grimaudo	"Read All About It"	Put in Hot-seat 2	Denis Henning
Episode 15 (October 31)	Sido	5	Lucas Rieger	"Heartbreak Hotel"	Put in Hot-seat 2	Giulia Grimaudo
Episode 15 (October 31)	Sido	6	Selina Schulz	"Ready or Not"	Eliminated	–
Episode 15 (October 31)	Sido	7	Katja Wiegand	"Niemand"	Eliminated	–
Episode 15 (October 31)	Sido	8	Freschta Akbarzada	"The Voice Within"	Put in Hot-seat 2	Lucas Rieger
Episode 15 (October 31)	Sido	9	Phillip & Danny	"Liebs oder lass es"	Eliminated	–
Episode 15 (October 31)	Rea	1	Anna Strohmayr	"Turning Tables"	Put in Hot-seat 1	
Episode 15 (October 31)	Rea	2	Jakob Rauno	"Junimond"	Put in Hot-seat 2	
Episode 15 (October 31)	Rea	3	Lucie Patt	"Thank U, Next"	Put in Hot-seat 1	Anna Strohmayr
Episode 15 (October 31)	Rea	4	Andrew Telles	"Girl Crush"	Put in Hot-seat 2	Jakob Rauno
Episode 15 (October 31)	Rea	5	Lea Herdt	"Bad Guy"	Eliminated	–
Episode 15 (October 31)	Rea	6	Anri Coza	"Here Comes the Rain Again"	Eliminated	–
Episode 15 (October 31)	Rea	7	Erwin Kintop	"You Are the Reason"	Put in Hot-seat 1	Lucie Patt
Episode 15 (October 31)	Rea	8	Christian Haas	"Word Up!"	Eliminated	–
Episode 15 (October 31)	Rea	9	Marita Hintz	"We Don't Have to Take Our Clothes Off"	Put in Hot-seat 2	Andrew Telles
Episode 15 (October 31)	Rea	10	Niklas Schregel	"Empty Space"	Eliminated	–

== Comeback Stage ==
For this season, the show added a brand new phase of competition called The Voice: Comeback Stage by SEAT that was exclusive to thevoiceofgermany.de. It was shown for the first time in the fifteenth season of the American version. After failing to turn a chair in the blind auditions or eliminated from battles and sing offs, artists had the chance to be selected by fifth coach Nico Santos to become a member of his ten-person team. The two winners competed in the Live Shows against the talents of the coaches Alice Merton, Rea Garvey, Sido and Mark Forster live on television for a chance to win the ninth season of The Voice of Germany.

=== First round ===
During the first round of competition, the six selected artists from Blind Auditions went head to head, two artists per episode, and Santos selected a winner to move on to the next round.

Artist won the battle and advanced to the next round
Artist lost the battle and was eliminated

Episode	Coach	Order	Artist	Song	Result
Episode 1 & 2 (September 12 & 19)	Nico	1	Dario Denegri	"Purple Rain"	Eliminated
Episode 1 & 2 (September 12 & 19)	Nico	2	Tina Trummer	"Schau mich nicht so an"	Advanced
Episode 3 (September 26)	Nico	1	Jan-Luca Ernst	"Bad Liar"	Eliminated
Episode 3 (September 26)	Nico	2	Celine Abeling	"Too Close"	Advanced
Episode 4 (October 3)	Nico	1	Heidi & Martin Bordt	"Somewhere only we know"	Eliminated
Episode 4 (October 3)	Nico	2	Bastian Stein	"All of the stars"	Advanced

=== Second round ===
In the second round, the three remaining artists chose another song to sing, with two of them advancing to the next round.

Artist won the battle and advanced to the next round
Artist lost the battle and was eliminated

Episode	Coach	Order	Artist	Song	Result
Episode 5 (October 10)	Nico	1	Celine Abeling	"Auf anderen Wegen"	Advanced
Episode 5 (October 10)	Nico	2	Tina Trummer	"Sweet Child o' Mine"	Advanced
Episode 5 (October 10)	Nico	3	Bastian Stein	"Wie Soll Ein Mensch Das Ertragen"	Eliminated

=== Third round ===
In the third round, Santos brought back two artists who were eliminated during the Battle rounds, giving them a chance to re-enter in the competition. These artists faced off against the two artists from the second round.

Artist won the battle and advanced to the final round
Artist lost the battle and was eliminated

Episode	Coach	Order	Artist	Song	Result
Episode 6 (October 17)	Nico	1	Philipp Fixmer	"Happier"	Advanced
Episode 6 (October 17)	Nico	2	Tina Trummer	"What About Us"	Eliminated
Episode 7 (October 24)	Nico	1	Linus Hemker	"Addicted to You"	Eliminated
Episode 7 (October 24)	Nico	2	Celine Abeling	"2x"	Advanced

=== Final round ===
In the final round, the two winners of the third round competed against two eliminated artists from the Sing Offs. From these four artists, two advanced in the Live Shows.

Artist won The Comeback Stage and advanced to the Live Shows
Artist lost the battle and was eliminated

Episode	Coach	Order	Artist	Song	Result
Episode 8 (October 31)	Nico	1	Niklas Schregel	"Be Alright"	Eliminated
Episode 8 (October 31)	Nico	2	Celine Abeling	"Wenn ich leiser bin"	Advanced
Episode 8 (October 31)	Nico	3	Philipp Fixmer	"Home"	Eliminated
Episode 8 (October 31)	Nico	4	Lucas Rieger	"Georgia on My Mind"	Advanced

== Live shows ==
The live shows began on November 3, 2019 on Sat.1. Each coach has in his/her team 2 artists.

=== Week 1: Semi-Final (November 3) ===
The semi-final aired on November 3, 2019, with two acts from each team performing. The public chose one artist from each team to advance to the final.

Color key

Artist was saved by the public's votes
Artist was eliminated

Order	Coach	Artist	Song	Voting	Result
1	Rea	Erwin Kintop	"Mercy"	54.5%	Advanced
2	Rea	Marita Hintz	"Lost Without You"	45.5%	Eliminated
3	Sido	Larissa Pitzen	"Chasing Highs"	33.0%	Eliminated
4	Sido	Freschta Akbarzada	"Unconditionally"	67.0%	Advanced
5	Mark	Oxa	"I'm Still Standing"	42.6%	Eliminated
6	Mark	Fidi Steinbeck	"Ich will nur"	57.4%	Advanced
7	Nico	Lucas Rieger	"Tutti Frutti"	70.8%	Advanced
8	Nico	Celine Abeling	"Und wenn ein Lied"	29.2%	Eliminated
9	Alice	Mariel Kirschall	"Jolene"	26.5%	Eliminated
10	Alice	Claudia Emmanuela Santoso	"Listen"	73.5%	Advanced

Non-competition performances
Order	Performer	Song
1	Mark Forster & his team (Oxa and Fidi Steinbeck)	"194 Länder"
2	Rea Garvey & his team (Marita Hintz and Erwin Kintop)	"Let's be Lovers Tonight"
3	Alice Merton & her team (Claudia Emmanuela Santoso and Mariel Kirschall)	"Easy"
4	Sido & his team (Freschta Akbarzada and Larissa Pitzen)	"Pyramiden"
5	Nico Santos & his team (Celine Abeling and Lucas Rieger)	"Play with Fire"
6	Samuel Rösch	"Wir"

=== Week 2: Final (November 10) ===
The final aired on November 10, 2019. In the final week, the five finalists performed a solo cover song, an original duet song with their coach and a duet with a special guest.

Coach	Artist	Order	Solo Song	Order	Original Song (feat. coach)	Order	Duet Song (with special guest)	Voting	Result
Nico Santos	Lucas Rieger	1	"Happy"	14	"Unlove"	9	"Guten Tag, liebes Glück" (with Max Raabe)	14.33%	Third Place
Rea Garvey	Erwin Kintop	6	"Someone like You	11	"How bout you"	2	"Outnumbered" (with Dermot Kennedy)	17.36%	Runner-up
Sido	Freschta Akbarzada	10	"Without You"	3	"Meine 3 Minuten"	12	"Don't Start Now" (with Dua Lipa)	9.41%	Fifth Place
Mark Forster	Fidi Steinbeck	4	"Weinst du"	7	"Warte mal"	15	"Quite Miss Home" (with James Arthur)	12.51%	Fourth Place
Alice Merton	Claudia Emmanuela Santoso	8	"I Have Nothing"	13	"Goodbye"	5	"Castles" (with Freya Ridings)	46.39%	Winner

== Elimination chart ==
Coaches color key

- Artist from Team Mark
- Artist from Team Alice
- Artist from Team Sido
- Artist from Team Rea
- Artist from Team Nico

Results color key

- Winner
- Runner-up
- Third place
- Fourth place
- Fifth Place
- Artist was saved by the public vote
- Artist was eliminated

=== Overall ===
Live show results per week
Artist	Week 1 Semi-Final	Week 2 Final
Claudia Emmanuela Santoso	Safe	Winner
Erwin Kintop	Safe	Runner-up
Lucas Rieger	Safe	3rd Place
Fidi Steinbeck	Safe	4th Place
Freschta Akbarzada	Safe	5th Place
Mariel Kirschall	Eliminated	Eliminated (Semi-Final)
Celine Abeling	Eliminated	Eliminated (Semi-Final)
Oxa	Eliminated	Eliminated (Semi-Final)
Larissa Pitzen	Eliminated	Eliminated (Semi-Final)
Marita Hintz	Eliminated	Eliminated (Semi-Final)

=== Team ===
Live shows results per team
Artist	Week 1 Semi-Final	Week 2 Final
Fidi Steinbeck	Advanced	Fourth place
Oxa	Eliminated	
Claudia Emmanuela Santoso	Advanced	Winner
Mariel Kirschall	Eliminated	
Freschta Akbarzada	Advanced	Fifth place
Larissa Pitzen	Eliminated	
Erwin Kintop	Advanced	Runner-up
Marita Hintz	Eliminated	
Lucas Rieger	Advanced	Third place
Celine Abeling	Eliminated	

== Live in Concert ==
Like the previous seasons, the finalists and a wildcard winner chosen by the audience, went on a concert tour in December across Germany. This tour began on December 6, 2019 and had nineteen stops. The tour featured the top finalists from each team, including Claudia Emmanuela Santoso, Erwin Kintop, Lucas Rieger, Fidi Steinbeck and Freschta Akbarzada and the wildcard winner, Mariel Kirschall.

The tour began on December 6, 2019 in Braunschweig and ended on December 30, 2019 in Bielefeld.

Tour dates
Date	City	Venue
December 6, 2019	Braunschweig	Stadthalle Braunschweig
December 7, 2019	Frankfurt	Jahrhunderthalle
December 8, 2019	Karlsruhe	Schwarzwaldhalle
December 9, 2019	Mannheim	Mannheimer Rosengarten
December 11, 2019	Siegen	Siegerlandhalle
December 12, 2019	Oberhausen	König Pilsener Arena
December 13, 2019	Trier	Trier Arena
December 14, 2019	Freiburg im Breisgau	SICK Arena
December 15, 2019	Fulda	Esperanto Halle
December 17, 2019	Koblenz	CGM Arena
December 18, 2019	Göttingen	Lokhalle
December 20, 2019	Ludwigsburg	MHP Arena
December 21, 2019	Erfurt	Messe Erfurt
December 22, 2019	Düren	Arena Kreis Düren
December 26, 2019	Augsburg	Schwabenhalle
December 27, 2019	Aschaffenburg	F.a.n. Frankenstolz Arena
December 28, 2019	Berlin	Verti Music Hall
December 29, 2019	Hamburg	Barclaycard Arena
December 30, 2019	Bielefeld	Stadthalle Bielefeld

== Contestants, who appeared in previous seasons ==
- Mark Agpas withdrew before the Battle Stage in the eighth season, but Mark Forster gave him a second chance and he advanced to the Battle Stage this season without auditioning.
- Luke Voigtmann participated in season 4, but no one coach turned for him.

== Ratings ==
Timeslot are CEST (UTC+2) for episodes 1 to 13 and CET (UTC+1) for episodes 14 to 17.

Episode		Date	Timeslot	Channel	Viewers (in millions)		Share (in %)		Source
Episode		Date	Timeslot	Channel	Total	14 - 49 Years	Total	14 - 49 Years	Source
1	"Blind Auditions"	September 12, 2019	Thursday 8:15 pm	ProSieben	3.21	1.71	12.5	22.0	
2	"Blind Auditions"	September 15, 2019	Sunday 8:15 pm	Sat.1	2.87	1.57	10.3	17.0	
3	"Blind Auditions"	September 19, 2019	Thursday 8:15 pm	ProSieben	2.99	1.64	11.6	20.8	
4	"Blind Auditions"	September 22, 2019	Sunday 8:15 pm	Sat.1	2.82	1.45	9.6	14.9	
5	"Blind Auditions"	September 26, 2019	Thursday 8:15 pm	ProSieben	2.96	1.56	11.1	19.3	
6	"Blind Auditions"	September 29, 2019	Sunday 8:15 pm	Sat.1	3.03	1.53	10.3	16.0	
7	"Blind Auditions"	October 3, 2019	Thursday 8:15 pm	ProSieben	2.74	1.50	9.1	16.7	
8	"Blind Auditions"	October 6, 2019	Sunday 8:15 pm	Sat.1	3.03	1.58	10.3	15.9	
9	"Blind Auditions"	October 10, 2019	Thursday 8:15 pm	ProSieben	3.14	1.57	11.9	20.9	
10	"Battle Rounds"	October 13, 2019	Sunday 8:15 pm	Sat.1	2.78	1.39	9.2	14.2	
11	"Battle Rounds"	October 17, 2019	Thursday 8:15 pm	ProSieben	2.71	1.42	10.1	17.8	
12	"Battle Rounds"	October 20, 2019	Sunday 8:15 pm	Sat.1	2.62	1.38	8.6	14.0	
13	"Battle Rounds"	October 24, 2019	Thursday 8:15 pm	ProSieben	2.37	1.28	9.1	16.8	
14	"Sing Offs"	October 27, 2019	Sunday 8:15 pm	Sat.1	2.35	1.26	8.4	13.9	
15	"Sing Offs"	October 31, 2019	Thursday 8:15 pm	ProSieben	2.17	1.09	8.7	14.9	
16	"Live Shows"	November 3, 2019	Sunday 8:15 pm	Sat.1	2.52	1.35	8.5	13.6	
17	"Live Shows"	November 10, 2019	Sunday 8:15 pm	Sat.1	2.58	1.21	9.7	13.7	
