= Live at Omeara =

Live album by Freya Ridings
- Released: 30 March 2018
- Recorded: 2018
- Genre: Pop
- Label: Good Soldier
- Producer: Alex H. N. Gilbert

Freya Ridings chronology
Live at St Pancras Old Church (2017)	Live at Omeara (2018)	You Mean the World to Me (2019)

Live at Omeara is the second live album by English singer-songwriter Freya Ridings. It was released in the United Kingdom on 30 March 2018 by Good Soldier.

== Background ==
The album is a live recording of the full setlist from the Ridings' performance at the Omeara in London in January 2018. On Facebook, Ridings' said, "Thank you so much everyone who came to Omeara last week and made it such a special night. Here's some memories from the day and a bit of my performance of Lost Without You. It was so lovely to meet you all afterwards, I'm feeling unbelievably blessed by all of this."

== Track listing ==
No.	Title	Writer(s)	Length
1.	"Love Is Fire"	Freya Ridings; Michael Busbee	3:36
2.	"Signals"	Ridings; Oliver Green	3:47
3.	"You Mean the World to Me"	Ridings; Keiron McIntosh	3:13
4.	"Work Song"	Andrew Hozier-Byrne	2:36
5.	"Blackout"	Ridings; Green	2:52
6.	"Castles"	Ridings; Dan Nigro	3:37
7.	"Wishbone"	Ridings; Jonathan Wright	3:03
8.	"Maps"	Karen Orzolek; Nicholas Zinner; Brian Chase	2:46
9.	"Ultraviolet"	Ridings; Luke Fitton	3:56
10.	"Unconditional"	Ridings	3:23
11.	"Lost Without You"	Ridings	4:16

== Charts ==
Chart (2018)	Peak position
Scottish Albums (Official Charts)	75

== Release history ==
Region	Date	Format	Label
United Kingdom	30 March 2018	Digital download	Good Soldier
