= You Mean the World to Me =

You Mean the World to Me may refer to:

- "You Mean the World to Me" (Toni Braxton song), 1994
- "You Mean the World to Me" (David Houston song), 1967
- You Mean the World to Me (EP), 2019 EP by Freya Ridings
  - "You Mean the World to Me" (Freya Ridings song), its title track
- You Mean the World to Me (film), 2017
