= Claudia Emmanuela Santoso =

Indonesian singer

- Born: Claudia Emmanuela Santoso; 27 October 2000 (age 25); Cirebon, Indonesia
- Genre: Pop
- Occupation: Singer
- Instrument: Vocals
- Years active: 2019–present
- Label: Universal Music Group

Claudia Emmanuela Santoso (born 27 October 2000) is an Indonesian singer. She is known for winning the ninth season of The Voice of Germany and became the first person of Asian descent who won the title, broadcast by the German television channels ProSieben and Sat.1 in 2019. She started gaining wide public attention after performing her rendition of The Greatest Showman soundtrack "Never Enough" in the blind audition of The Voice of Germany. The footage of her blind audition has been one of the most viewed videos in The Voice of Germany history. Before joining The Voice of Germany, she also took part in many children's singing competitions in Indonesia such as Akademi Fantasi Indosiar Junior in 2008, Idola Cilik in 2011 and Mamamia Show in 2014.

== Life and career ==
Santoso attended music school since the age of 4. She participated in the talent search events in Indonesia, including AFI Junior in 2008, Idola Cilik in 2011 and Mamamia Show in 2014.

Santoso‘s maternal uncle encouraged her to pursue her higher education in Germany and sent her to a German language course at the Goethe-Institut Indonesia in Bandung up to the A1 level. During her school holiday, she attended Inlingua Language School in Munich, taking A2 level courses. After graduation from high school in 2018, Santoso attended LMU Munich in Germany.

In February 2019, Santoso auditioned for The Voice of Germany in Munich, competing against approximately 2,000 participants. She passed through the competition to the Blind Audition stage.

During the Blind Audition stage, Santoso performed the song "Never Enough" from the soundtrack of the film The Greatest Showman. She chose Alice Merton as her coach. The video of her Blind Audition performance became one of the most watched videos in The Voice of Germany history.

During the televised competition, Santoso performed the songs "Castles", "I Have Nothing" and "Goodbye". With 46.39% of the popular vote, Santoso was declared the winner of The Voice of Germany season 9 and was the first Asian to win the event.

On the final of The Voice of Germany, Santoso sang her first single, "Goodbye," as a duet with Merton. The song was released on 10 November 2019 and appeared on the charts on iTunes Indonesia and several European countries.

=== Performances on The Voice of Germany 2019 ===
Theme	Song	Original Singer	result
The Blind Auditions	"Never Enough"	Loren Allred	Four chairs turned Joined Team Alice
The Battle	"Say Something" vs Emma & Felix	A Great Big World & Christina Aguilera	Saved by Coach
Sing-Offs	"Run"	Snow Patrol	Saved by Coach
Semi-Finals	"Listen"	Beyonce	Saved by Public Vote
Final	"I Have Nothing"	Whitney Houston	Winner
Final	"Castles" ft Freya Ridings	Freya Ridings	Winner
Final	"Goodbye" ft Alice Merton	Claudia Emmanuela Santoso	Winner

Non Competition Performances on The Voice of Germany
Theme	Song	Original Singer	Partners
Semi Final	"Easy"	Alice Merton	Alice Merton & Mariel (Team Alice)

Voting Result Claudia on The Voice of Germany
Theme	Percentage of Claudia Voting	Rival	Percentage of Rival Voting	Result
Semi Final	73.5% (Advanced)	Mariel Kirschall (Team Alice)	26.5% (Eliminated)	Claudia advanced to Final
Final	46.39% (Winner)	Erwin Kintop (Team Rea)	17.36% (Runner-up)	Winner
Final	46.39% (Winner)	Lucas Rieger (Team Nico)	14.33% (3rd Place)	Winner
Final	46.39% (Winner)	Fidi Steinbeck (Team Mark)	12.51% (4th Place)	Winner
Final	46.39% (Winner)	Freschta Akbarzada (Team Sido)	9.41% (5th Place)	Winner

== Discography ==
=== Single ===
- "Goodbye" (2019)
- "If I Try" (2023)
- "Better Alone" (2024)

== Concert tours ==
Headlining

- The Voice of Germany: Live in Concert (2019)

Awards and achievements
Preceded by Samuel Rösch	The Voice of Germany; Winner; 2019	Succeeded by Paula Dalla Corte
