= BPK Penabur =

Indonesian Protestant school

BPK Penabur Badan Pendidikan Kristen Penabur

District information
- Type: Independent
- Motto: Iman, Ilmu dan Pelayanan (Faith, Knowledge and Service)
- Established: 7 June 1950; 76 years ago
- Schools: See list
- Affiliation: Indonesian Christian Church Synod

Other information
- Website: bpkpenabur.or.id

BPK PENABUR (abbreviation of Badan Pendidikan Kristen PENABUR; lit. 'Penabur Christian Educational Board') is a body of private Protestant schools founded by John Penabur under the Indonesian Christian Church (GKI) of the West Java Synod in Indonesia. BPK PENABUR has schools in 15 cities which are in four provinces: West Java, DKI Jakarta, Banten and Lampung. The 15 cities are Jakarta, Bandung, Cimahi, Cirebon, Bogor, Serang, Bandar Lampung, Metro, Cicurug, Sukabumi, Rengasdengklok, Indramayu, Jatibarang, Cianjur and Tasikmalaya. BPK PENABUR's vision is "To become a Christian educational institution superior in Faith, Knowledge, and Service." Its mission is "To optimally develop the students' potential through quality education and teaching based on Christian values." BPK PENABUR covers education levels including preschool, primary school, middle school, high school and a Sekolah Menengah Kejuruan in Pharmaceutics. There are PENABUR international schools in Jakarta and Bandung. As part of its identity, BPK PENABUR has its own march composed by J. Haryanto S. known as "Mars BPK PENABUR".

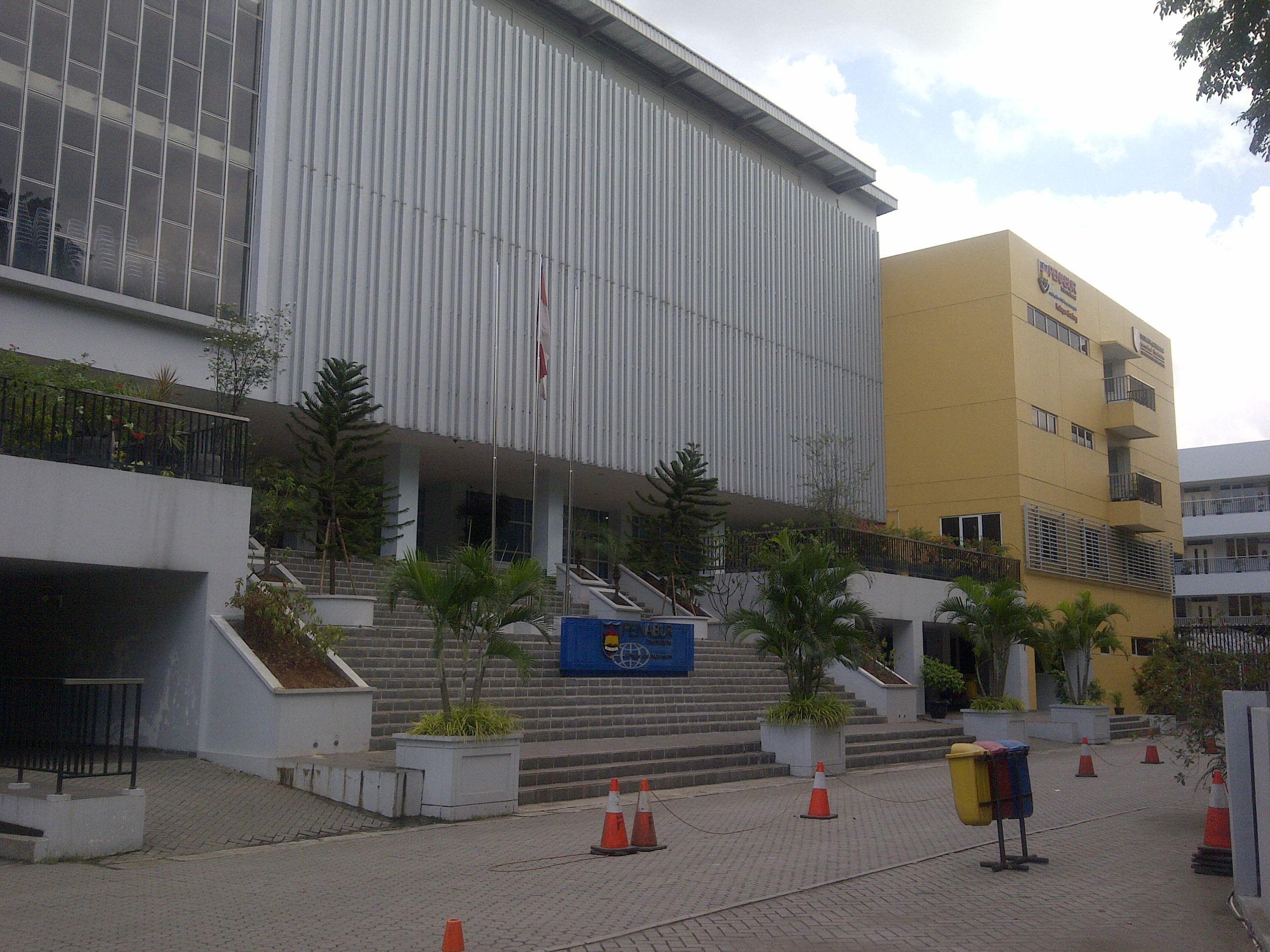
Penabur International School Kelapa Gading Campus (PISKG) in Kelapa Gading, North Jakarta

== History ==
=== Pre-1950 ===
The History of BPK PENABUR is strongly linked to the Gereja Kristen Indonesia of the West Java Synod (then named Tiong Hoa Kie Tok Kauw Hwee Khu Hwee Djabar - THKTKHKH Djabar) which has already existed since the Dutch colonial era. The THKTKHKH Synod of West Java is one of the parties that were trusted by the missionary institutions of the Dutch to take over part of the educational institutions that they left behind after the end of Dutch rule over Indonesia. This trust is then responded to quickly by the Synod in a session held on 28 May 1948 in Bandung by forming a committee responsible for taking crucial steps to open Christian schools. Said committee then acquired the support of Rev. Pouw Peng Hong, a pioneer of an independent movement of churches in West Java. With the Reverend's support, the committee became more vigorous in their efforts, especially in acquiring funds and support from teachers to realize their hopes of building a Christian school under the THKTKHKH Synod of West Java. The efforts from the Committee finally had some results. In the years 1948–1950, the committee (renamed into the School Committee) successfully built 4 evening schools using the old missionary institution's school buildings. The 4 schools are Christian Primary Schools (SDK) which are located at 29 Pintu Besi St, Tanah Njonja St (now Gunung Sahari St), Oranjeplein St (now Slamet Riyadi St), and 11 Sluisbrugstraat St (now Pintu Air St). In contrast to the Christian schools in Jakarta which focus more on educating and involve more teachers, the Christian schools in Bandung concentrate more on building faith and involve reverends.

=== 1950s: The founding of BP THKTKHKH West Java ===
After the Round Table Conference, the important figures of the Synod started intensely thinking about the condition of the schools under their custody in Indonesia. Finally, after a series of meetings, the School Committee and the important figures of the Synod agreed to found Badan Pendidikan THKTKHKH (BP THKTKHKH) Djabar. According to a Notarial Deed composed by H. J. J. Lamers in Bandung, represented by Notary Tan Eng Kiam, BP THKTKHKH of West Java is thereby founded and separated from the church. The institution then starts organizing and appointing management. The first president of BP THKTKHKH Djabar was Ong Teng Houw, the secretary was Liem Boen Liong, and the treasurer was Lie Bo Tay. During the founding, BP THKTKHKH Djabar's assets were spread in six cities; Jakarta (5 compounds), Bandung (3 compounds, 2 shared with Gereja Kristen Pasundan), Cirebon, Sukabumi, Jatibarang, and Indramayu. The central office of BP THKTKHKH Djabar was also moved to Jakarta from Bandung following the restoration of Jakarta as the capital city.

=== 1950-1968: The development of BP THKTKHKH Djabar and its renaming to BPK Djabar ===
During this period, BP THKTKHKH Djabar started expanding to fulfill its goal of building Christian schools. The construction of schools had started spreading to other cities, even those where BP THKTKHKH Djabar hadn't been established yet. In 1953, BP THKTKHKH Djabar pioneered a school in Tasikmalaya which would later become BPK PENABUR Tasikmalaya, followed by BP THKTKHKH Cianjur in 1955, Bogor in 1958, Cimahi in 1961, and then Metro in 1967. Alongside its expansion efforts, BP THKTKHKH Djabar started improving the schools in the original 6 cities. In 1951, Dutch missionaries donated a sum of money to the Christian Kindergarten-Primary school (TKK-SDK) in Kebonjati. 4 years later, in 1955, a new Christian Primary school was built in Guntur St located in Bandung, followed by a Christian Junior High School in Jenderal Sudirman St also in Bandung. To complement the Kindergartens, Primary Schools, and Junior High Schools previously built, the institution built an Assistant Pharmacist School, which is now a Pharmacy Vocational High School. In July 1965, BP THKTKHKH Djabar also opened its first Senior High School(SMA) in Kosambi St in Bandung whose first principal was Drs. Kwee Hok Gwan. This Senior High School will eventually be named SMAK 1 BPK PENABUR Bandung (BPK PENABUR Bandung Christian Senior High School 1). In 1956, the Komite Sekolah (School Committee) was transformed and renamed to Komite Pembantu Setempat (KPS) (Local Assistance Committee). The board members of this committee were members of the THKTKHKH church. An independent KPS in Bandung was established later on in 1959. In 1967, BP THKTKHKH Djabar officially renamed itself to Jajasan Badan Pendidikan Kristen Djawa Barat (BPK Djabar) as stated under Notarist Act No. 33 dated 27 January 1967, issued by Notarist E. Pondaag. As a result of the renaming, BPK Djabar is now open to all ethnic groups in Indonesia and is based on Christian values.

=== 1968-1989: The development of BPK Djabar and its renaming to BPK PENABUR ===
After renaming itself to BPK Djabar, the institution kept expanding to more cities. In 1975, BPK Djabar Bandar Lampung was officially established, followed by BPK Djabar Rengasdengklok in the same year. The year after, BPK Djabar Cicurug was also established. In 1989, BPK Djabar Serang was established. In other cities, the schools in each city grow faster and faster, with the KPS of each city building more and more school complexes of different education levels. The spread of BPK Djabar to other cities as well as its goal to sow the seeds of Christian education to other cities influenced the management of BPK Djabar to rename itself to BPK PENABUR (literally meaning 'sower') in 1989 as stated in Act no. 121, issued by Notarist Wiryomartani S.H. This event reached Berita Negara Republik Indonesia (National News of the Republic of Indonesia) edition 36, with the name being officially adopted on 1 July 1989, during the GKI Jawa Barat 46th Synod General Assembly.

== List of PENABUR Schools ==
Province	Regency/City	School Level					
Province	Regency/City	TKK (Kindergarten)	SDK (Elementary School)	SMPK (Junior High School)	SMAK (Senior High School)	SMKK (Vocational High School)	SPK INTERNATIONAL
Lampung	Bandar Lampung City	TKK BPK PENABUR LAMPUNG	SDK BPK PENABUR LAMPUNG	SMPK BPK PENABUR LAMPUNG	SMAK BPK PENABUR LAMPUNG	SMKK BPK PENABUR LAMPUNG	
Lampung	Metro City	TKK BPK PENABUR METRO	SDK BPK PENABUR METRO	SMPK BPK PENABUR METRO			
Banten	Serang City	TKK BPK PENABUR SERANG	SDK BPK PENABUR SERANG	SMPK BPK PENABUR SERANG	SMAK BPK PENABUR SERANG		
Banten	South Tangerang City	TKK PENABUR BINTARO JAYA	SDK PENABUR BINTARO JAYA	SMPK PENABUR BINTARO JAYA	SMAK PENABUR BINTARO JAYA		
Banten	Tangerang City	TKK PENABUR KOTA MODERN	SDK PENABUR KOTA MODERN	SMPK PENABUR KOTA MODERN	SMAK PENABUR KOTA MODERN		
Banten	Tangerang Regency	TKK PENABUR GADING SERPONG	SDK PENABUR GADING SERPONG	SMPK PENABUR GADING SERPONG	SMAK PENABUR GADING SERPONG		
Jakarta	Central Jakarta Administrative City	TKK 1 PENABUR; TKK 2 PENABUR; TKK 7 PENABUR	SDK 1 PENABUR; SDK 2 PENABUR; SDK 3 PENABUR	SMPK 1 PENABUR JAKARTA; SMPK 2 PENABUR; SMPK 3 PENABUR	SMAK 1 PENABUR; SMAK 2 PENABUR JAKARTA; SMAK 3 PENABUR	SMKF PENABUR	
Jakarta	East Jakarta Administrative City	TKK 3 PENABUR; TKK 5 PENABUR; TKK 8 PENABUR	SDK 4 PENABUR; SDK 8 PENABUR	SMPK 5 PENABUR	SMAK 7 PENABUR		
Jakarta	North Jakarta Administrative City	TKK 6 PENABUR; TKK 10 PENABUR	SDK 6 PENABUR; SDK 10 PENABUR	SMPK 4 PENABUR; SMPK 6 PENABUR JAKARTA	SMAK 5 PENABUR; SMAK 6 PENABUR		PENABUR PRIMARY KELAPA GADING; PENABUR SECONDARY KELAPA GADING; PENABUR SECONDARY TANJUNG DUREN
Jakarta	South Jakarta Administrative City	TKK 9 PENABUR; TKK TIRTA MARTA (BPK PENABUR PONDOK INDAH)	SDK 9 PENABUR; SDK TIRTA MARTA (BPK PENABUR PONDOK INDAH)	SMPK TIRTA MARTA (BPK PENABUR PONDOK INDAH)	SMAK TIRTA MARTA (BPK PENABUR PONDOK INDAH)		
Jakarta	West Jakarta Administrative City	TKK 11 PENABUR	SDK 11 PENABUR	SMPK 7 PENABUR	SMAK 4 PENABUR		
West Java	Bandung City	TKK BPK PENABUR 246; TKK BPK PENABUR 638; TKK BPK PENABUR THI; TKK BPK PENABUR PASKAL; TKK BPK PENABUR GUNTUR; TKK BPK PENABUR SINGGASANA; TKK BPK PENABUR BANDA	SDK 1 BPK PENABUR; SDK 5 BPK PENABUR; SDK 6 BPK PENABUR; SDK THI BPK PENABUR; SDK BPK PENABUR PASIRKALIKI 164; SDK BPK PENABUR SINGGASANA; SDK BPK PENABUR BANDA	SMPK 1 BPK PENABUR; SMPK 4 BPK PENABUR; SMPK 5 BPK PENABUR - SMPK BPK PENABUR HOLIS; SMPK BPK PENABUR SINGGASANA; SMPK BPK PENABUR BANDA	SMAK 1 BPK PENABUR; SMAK 2 BPK PENABUR; SMAK 3 BPK PENABUR; SMAK BPK PENABUR HOLIS; SMAK BPK PENABUR SINGGASANA; SMAK BPK PENABUR BANDA		
West Java	West Bandung Regency	TKK BPK PENABUR KBP	SDK BPK PENABUR KBP	SMPK BPK PENABUR KBP			
West Java	Bekasi City	TKK BPK PENABUR PONDOK GEDE; TKK BPK PENABUR SUMMARECON BEKASI; TKK BPK PENABUR HARAPAN INDAH; TKK BPK PENABUR BEKASI AGUS SALIM	SDK BPK PENABUR SUMMARECON BEKASI; SDK BPK PENABUR HARAPAN INDAH; SDK BPK PENABUR BEKASI AGUS SALIM	SMPK BPK PENABUR SUMMARECON BEKASI; SMPK BPK PENABUR HARAPAN INDAH	SMAK BPK PENABUR SUMMARECON BEKASI; SMAK BPK PENABUR HARAPAN INDAH		
West Java	Bekasi Regency	TKK BPK PENABUR KOTA JABABEKA	SDK BPK PENABUR KOTA JABABEKA	SMPK BPK PENABUR KOTA JABABEKA	SMAK BPK PENABUR KOTA JABABEKA		
West Java	Bogor City	TKK BPK PENABUR BOGOR	SDK BPK PENABUR BOGOR	SMPK BPK PENABUR BOGOR	SMAK BPK PENABUR BOGOR		
West Java	Bogor Regency	TKK NATIONAL PLUS; TKK BPK PENABUR KOTA WISATA	SD NASIONAL PLUS BPK PENABUR BOGOR; SDK BPK PENABUR KOTA WISATA	SMPK NASIONAL PLUS BPK PENABUR BOGOR; SMPK BPK PENABUR KOTA WISATA	SMAK NASIONAL PLUS BPK PENABUR BOGOR; SMAK BPK PENABUR KOTA WISATA		
West Java	Cianjur Regency	TKK BPK PENABUR CIANJUR	SDK BPK PENABUR CIANJUR	SMPK BPK PENABUR CIANJUR	SMAK BPK PENABUR CIANJUR		
West Java	Cimahi City	TKK BPK PENABUR CIMAHI	SDK BPK PENABUR CIMAHI	SMPK BPK PENABUR CIMAHI			
West Java	Cirebon City	TKK PLUS PENABUR CIREBON; TKK BPK PENABUR CIREBON	SDK PLUS PENABUR CIREBON; SDK 1 BPK PENABUR CIREBON	SMPK PLUS PENABUR CIREBON; SMPK BPK PENABUR CIREBON	SMAK PLUS PENABUR CIREBON; SMAK BPK PENABUR CIREBON		
West Java	Cirebon Regency	TKK BPK PENABUR JAMBLANG	SDK BPK PENABUR JAMBLANG				
West Java	Depok City	TKK BPK PENABUR DEPOK; TKK TIRTA MARTA (BPK PENABUR CINERE)	SDK BPK PENABUR DEPOK; SDK TIRTA MARTA (BPK PENABUR CINERE)	SMPK BPK PENABUR DEPOK; SMPK TITRA MARTA (BPK PENABUR CINERE)			
West Java	Indramayu Regency	TKK BPK PENABUR INDRAMAYU; TKK BPK PENABUR JATIBARANG	SDK BPK PENABUR INDRAMAYU; SDK BPK PENABUR JATIBARANG	SMPK BPK PENABUR INDRAMAYU; SMPK BPK PENABUR JATIBARANG			
West Java	Karawang Regency	TKK BPK PENABUR RENGASDENGKLOK	SDK BPK PENABUR RENGASDENGKLOK				
West Java	Sukabumi City	TKK BPK PENABUR SUKABUMI; TKK BPK PENABUR CICURUG	SDK BPK PENABUR SUKABUMI; SDK BPK PENABUR CICURUG	SMPK BPK PENABUR SUKABUMI	SMAK BPK PENABUR SUKABUMI		
West Java	Tasikmalaya Regency	TKK BPK PENABUR TASIKMALAYA	SDK BPK PENABUR TASIKMALAYA	SMPK BPK PENABUR TASIKMALAYA	SMAK BPK PENABUR TASIKMALAYA		

== Notable alumni ==
- Luhut Binsar Pandjaitan, Coordinating Minister for Maritime Affairs and Investment of Indonesia
- Enggartiasto Lukita, Minister of Trade of Indonesia for 2016–2019
- Henky Solaiman, Actor, producer, and director
- Twins of Marcel and Mischa Chandrawinata, Indonesian actor and model
- Claudia Emmanuela Santoso, Singer, winner of The Voice of Germany Season 9
- Victor Rachmat Hartono, Operation Director for PT Djarum and President Director of Djarum Foundation
- Galatia Gea Amanda, Runner Up for Indonesia's Next Top Model 2020–2021
