= SMAK 1 Penabur Jakarta =

SMAK 1 BPK PENABUR JAKARTA

Location
- Jl. Tanjung Duren Raya no. 4, Grogol Petamburan, West Jakarta 11470

Information
- Type: Private
- Established: 1947
- Principal: Lie Fong Fong
- Enrollment: approx. 350 annually
- Color: Crimson Blue Yellow
- Nickname: SMAK 1, Smukie (informal)
- Website: https://bpkpenabur.or.id/jakarta/smak-1-penabur/

SMAK 1 BPK PENABUR Jakarta (also known as SMAK 1, SMUK 1, nicknamed SMUKIE) is a private Christian high school in Jakarta, Indonesia. It is located in Tanjung Duren, a financial and residential district in West Jakarta.

SMAK 1 Is considered by the residents of Indonesia as a school of prestige, and is further backed by gaining the highest median points of the 2021 UTBK examination in the Jakarta administrative province.

SMAK 1 sends its students to local and international competitions, most notably the International Science Olympiads, and the National Science Olympiad.

SMAK 1 is one of 50 schools in Jakarta, Banten, Lampung and West Java managed by BPK PENABUR, a Christian-based organization.

== History ==
Sekolah Menengah Atas Kristen 1 PENABUR - Jakarta (English: PENABUR 1 Christian Senior High School - Jakarta) was established on 1947 as a MULO (Meer Uitgebreid Lager Onderwijs, Colonial Dutch secondary school) in its old location at Pintu Air 11 Road (then known as Sluisbrugstraat 11). Its director was J. C. Boss (1947–1950), a mathematician. In the following year, the school was renamed as CVS (Christelijke Vereniging Scholen, Christian Association School), and its directorial position was taken over by Dr. Van Der Meer (1950–1951).

Following the end of Dutch colonization in Indonesia in 1945, CVS was handed to THKTKH (Tiong Hoa Kie Tok Kauw Hwee, Union of Chinese Christians) and renamed SMA Istimewa (Special High School). Lessons were conducted in Mandarin Chinese and Indonesian.

On August 1, 1950, SMA Istimewa was taken over by BPK Jabar Foundation, and the school underwent major revamping. One of these changes was the adjustment of its name to SMAK 1 (Sekolah Menengah Atas Kristen 1) and the usage of Indonesian as the sole medium of instruction. The addition of the word "Kristen" (Christian) was done to emphasize its Christian roots and values.

In 1956, the school was selected as a model school for the development of other schools in Jakarta. In the same year, it also set the record-high for Indonesian National Physics and Chemistry Examinations, an achievement held until today.

In March 1989, BPK Jabar KPS Jakarta changed its name to BPK PENABUR KPS Jakarta. In the same year SMAK 1 was moved to its current location of Tanjung Duren Raya Road. The school has a running track, canteen, sport fields, science laboratories, library, auditorium, language laboratory, music and dance rooms, drawing rooms, a greenhouse, a student counseling center, students' council room, large assembly hall (for up to 1000 people), twenty eight classrooms, etc.

The current principal is Lie Fong Fong, M.Pd. who has held the position since the 2025-2026 academic year.
