= Blood Orange (album) =

2023 album by Freya Ridings

Studio album by Freya Ridings
- Released: 28 April 2023
- Genre: Pop
- Length: 47:26
- Label: Good Soldier; AWAL
- Producer: Kamille; Will Bloomfield; Steve Mac; Ewan J. Phillips; Lostboy; Sammy Witte; Jack Gilbert; Spencer Stewart; Jimmy Napes; Ryan Linvill; Federico Vindver; Jesse Shatkin

Freya Ridings chronology
Freya Ridings (2019)	Blood Orange (2023)	Mother of Pearl (2026)

Singles from Blood Orange
- 1. "Weekends" Released: 12 January 2023; 2. "Face in the Crowd" Released: 17 February 2023; 3. "Can I Jump?" Released: 24 March 2023; 4. "Perfect" Released: 7 April 2023; 5. "I Feel Love" Released: 27 April 2023

Blood Orange is the second studio album by English singer Freya Ridings. It was released on 28 April 2023, by Good Soldier Records and AWAL. The first single "Weekends" was released on 12 January 2023.

== Critical reception ==
Professional ratings
Review scores
Source	Rating
Dork	4/5 stars
The Line of Best Fit	3/10
The Telegraph	3/5 stars

Martyn Young from Dork called Blood Orange "impressive in its scope and ambition" and noted: "Combining widescreen anthemic string-laden pop with joyous disco-tinged hops and just the right dose of heartbreak, it's a step up from an artist looking to establish themselves as a big deal."

== Commercial performance ==
In the United Kingdom, Blood Orange spent one week at number seven on the UK Albums Chart with recorded sales of 7,654 units over the first week. It became Ridings' second top 10 album in the region, following her debut which peaked at number three.

== Track listing ==
Blood Orange track listing
No.	Title	Writer(s)	Producer(s)	Length
1.	"Blood Orange"	Freya Ridings; Camille Purcell; Will Bloomfield	Kamille; Bloomfield	3:13
2.	"Bite Me"	Ridings; Purcell; Bloomfield	Kamille; Bloomfield	4:09
3.	"Weekends"	Ridings; Steve Mac	Mac	3:20
4.	"Face in the Crowd"	Ridings	Ewan J. Phillips	3:24
5.	"Perfect"	Ridings; Phillips	Phillips	3:06
6.	"Dancing in a Hurricane"	Ridings; Peter Rycroft; Phil Plested	Lostboy	3:14
7.	"Happier Alone"	Ridings; Casey Smith; Sammy Witte	White	3:14
8.	"Wither on the Vine"	Ridings; Amy Wadge; Arden Ridings; Phil Cook	White	3:19
9.	"Bitter"	Ridings; Mona Khoshoi; Sammy Witte	White	3:23
10.	"Someone New"	Ridings; Mark Taylor; Paul Barry	Phillips; Jack Gilbert	3:23
11.	"Last Day That You Loved Me"	Ridings; Caroline Ailin; Spencer Stewart	Stewart	3:05
12.	"Wolves"	Ridings; James Napier	Jimmy Napes; Ryan Linvill	3:30
13.	"Can I Jump?"	Ridings; Annika Bennett; Federico Vindver; Scott Harris	Vindver	3:43
14.	"I Feel Love"	Ridings; Jesse Shatkin; Stephen Wrabel	Shatkin	3:13
Total length:				47:26

== Charts ==
Chart performance for Blood Orange
Chart (2023)	Peak position
Australian Hitseekers Albums (ARIA)	15
Austrian Albums (Ö3 Austria)	71
German Albums (Offizielle Top 100)	18
Irish Albums (IRMA)	82
Scottish Albums (OCC)	9
Swiss Albums (Schweizer Hitparade)	28
UK Albums (OCC)	7
