= Love Is Fire =

Love Is Fire may refer to:

- "Love Is Fire", a single by The Parachute Club
- "Love Is Fire", a song by Freya Ridings from her 2019 self-titled album
