= Lost Without You (Freya Ridings song) =

Single by Freya Ridings

from the EP You Mean the World to Me and the album Freya Ridings
- Released: 3 November 2017
- Recorded: 2017
- Length: 3:45
- Label: Good Soldier, Capitol
- Songwriter: Freya Ridings
- Producer: Ollie Green

Freya Ridings singles chronology
"Maps" (2017)	"Lost Without You" (2017)	"Ultraviolet" (2018)

"Lost Without You" is a song by British singer-songwriter Freya Ridings. It was released as a digital download on 3 November 2017 via Ridings' record label Good Soldier Records as the second single from Ridings' upcoming eponymous debut album (2019). The song was produced by Ollie Green. The song was included as part of Ridings' debut EP, You Mean the World to Me, as the second single from the project.

After being featured in Love Island, the song became Ridings' first charting single in July 2018, when it debuted on the UK Singles Chart; eventually peaking at number nine in October 2018. The song was sent to Australian radio on 31 January 2020 as the follow-up single to "Castles". In July 2023, the track was certified triple Platinum by the British Phonographic Industry in recognition of achieving 1.8 million chart sales in the UK.

The song was used at first in a Nokia Mobile Christmas advertisement, after featuring in the second episode (Whose side are you on?) of the sixth season of American drama TV show Power during former AUSA Angela Valdez's funeral. The song was also featured in season 15, episode 19 of Grey's Anatomy, and the first season finale of Love, Victor. Kodi Lee covered the song in the last round of competition in the 2019 season of America's Got Talent, after which he was crowned the season's winner.

== Charts ==
=== Weekly charts ===
Chart (2018–2019)	Peak position
Belgium (Ultratip Bubbling Under Flanders)	3
Ireland (IRMA)	16
Scotland Singles (OCC)	5
UK Indie (OCC)	1
UK Singles (OCC)	9
US Adult Contemporary (Billboard)	16

=== Year-end charts ===
Chart (2018)	Position
UK Singles (Official Charts Company)	81
Chart (2019)	Position
UK Singles (Official Charts Company)	60
US Adult Contemporary (Billboard)	45

== Certifications ==
Region	Certification	Certified units/sales
Australia (ARIA)	Platinum	70,000^{‡}
Canada (Music Canada)	Platinum	80,000^{‡}
Denmark (IFPI Danmark)	Platinum	90,000^{‡}
Germany (BVMI)	Gold	200,000^{‡}
New Zealand (RMNZ)	Platinum	30,000^{‡}
Switzerland (IFPI Switzerland)	Platinum	20,000^{‡}
United Kingdom (BPI)	3× Platinum	1,800,000^{‡}
^{‡} Sales+streaming figures based on certification alone.

== Release history ==
Region	Date	Format	Label
United Kingdom	3 November 2017	Digital download	Good Soldier Songs
Australia	31 January 2020	Contemporary Hit Radio	Capitol Records
