= Mother of Pearl (album) =

2026 album by Freya Ridings

Studio album by Freya Ridings
- Released: 29 May 2026
- Length: 40:06
- Label: BMG
- Producers: Sam de Jong; Jennifer Decilveo; Toby Gad; Ewan J Phillips; Alex Seaver; Fraser T. Smith; Adam Yaron

Freya Ridings chronology
Blood Orange (2023)	Mother of Pearl (2026)

Mother of Pearl is the third studio album by the English singer Freya Ridings. It was released by BMG Rights Management on 29 May 2026.

== Critical reception ==
Professional ratings
Review scores
Source	Rating
Clash	8/10
Hot Press	7/10
Rolling Stone Germany	4/5 stars

Georgia McKnight of Clash praised Mother of Pearl as "a powerful, hugely honest series of songs," highlighting its themes of resilience, rebirth, and empowerment. She noted that Freya Ridings expands beyond her trademark ballads with more diverse instrumentation, stronger songwriting, and explorations of female rage and rebellion, concluding that the album represents a significant artistic evolution and awarding it 8/10. Hot Press editor Edwin McFee described the album as "an emotional and cinematic listen" and "a gem," emphasizing Ridings' powerhouse vocals and the hit potential of tracks like "Euphoria," "Battleship," and "Undefeated." He framed the record as a fresh creative chapter after the disappointing Blood Orange, ultimately giving it 7/10. Meanwhile, Jörn Schlüter from Rolling Stone noted that Ridings draws on "the ancient power of the ocean" as a metaphor for the album’s flowing yet forceful songs, praising its themes of female empowerment and resilience, and concluding that despite collaborations with several hit songwriters, Mother of Pearl remains “an impressive statement of artistic will."

== Commercial performance ==
Mother of Pearl achieved moderate chart success across Europe, although it became Ridings' lowest-charting studio album to date. In the United Kingdom, the album debuted at number 26 on the UK Albums Chart, making it her first album to miss the UK top 10, while reaching number 12 on the Scottish Albums Chart. Elsewhere, it peaked at number 36 in Germany, number 42 in Switzerland, and number 84 on the Belgian Albums Chart in Flanders.

== Track listing ==
Mother of Pearl track listing
No.	Title	Writer(s)	Producer(s)	Length
1.	"Euphoria"	Freya Ridings; Max Wolfgang; Amy Wadge	Ewan J Phillips	2:51
2.	"Wild Horse"	F. Ridings; Sam de Jong; Michael Matosic	De Jong	3:13
3.	"I Have Always Loved You"	F. Ridings; Toby Gad	Gad	3:07
4.	"Dancing In the Kitchen"	F. Ridings; Benjamin Francis Leftwich; Ewan Phillips	Phillips; Jenn Decilveo^{[a]}	3:15
5.	"Undefeated"	F. Ridings; Jon Levine	Fraser T. Smith; Decilveo^{[a]}	4:22
6.	"R U O K?"	F. Ridings; Rick Nowels	Decilveo; Nick Squillante^{[v]}	4:29
7.	"Battleship"	F. Ridings; Arden Ridings; Benjamin Kohn; Tom Barnes; Peter Kelleher	Decilveo; Squillante^{[v]}	3:10
8.	"Wicker Woman"	F. Ridings; Barnes; Kelleher; Kohn; Cleo Tighe; Phillips; A. Ridings; Catherine Jansen-Ridings; Richard Ridings	Decilveo; Squillante^{[v]}	3:11
9.	"Mother of Pearl"	F. Ridings	Adam Yaron	4:11
10.	"If This Is a Dream"	F. Ridings; Gad	Gad	3:36
11.	"Strength In Me"	F. Ridings; Alex Seaver; Phillips	Seaver; Phillips^{[a]}; Tyler Demorest^{[a]}	4:37
Total length:				40:06

=== Note ===
- ^{^[a]} indicates an additional producer

== Personnel ==
Credits are adapted from the album's liner notes and Tidal.

=== Musicians ===
- Freya Ridings – vocals (all tracks), background vocals (tracks 1–8, 11); drums, hand claps (1); piano (3–7, 9, 10), Mellotron (6)
- Ewan J Phillips – background vocals (1, 4, 6); drum programming, acoustic guitar (1, 4); cello (1, 7, 8); programming (1, 11); foot stomp, hand claps, tambourine (1); glockenspiel, piano, ukulele (4)
- Amy Wadge – background vocals (1)
- Dan Grech-Marguerat – additional programming (2, 8, 9)
- Sam de Jong – bass guitar, drums, guitar, keyboards, percussion, strings, synthesizer (2)
- Lauren Conklin – cello, string arrangement, viola, violin (3)
- Sam KS – drums (4–8)
- David Levita – bass guitar (5–8), acoustic guitar (5, 6), guitar (7, 8)
- Fraser T. Smith – additional keyboards, drum programming (5)
- Ash Soan – drums (5)
- Davide Rossi – cello, string arrangement, viola, violin (5)
- Jenn Decilveo – synthesizer (6–8), background vocals (6, 7), drum programming (6, 8), piano (6), additional keyboards (7)
- Hal Rosenfeld – programming, string arrangement (6)
- Toby Gad – bass guitar, drum programming, guitar (10)
- Alex Seaver – additional keyboards, background vocals, drum programming, synthesizer (11)
- Tyler Demorest – acoustic guitar, bass guitar, electric guitar (11)
- Jake Reed – drums (11)

=== Technical and visuals ===
- Jeremy Wheatley – mixing (1, 3–7, 10, 11)
- Dan Grech-Marguerat – mixing, engineering (2, 8, 9)
- Dick Beetham – mastering (1–7, 9–11))
- Stuart Hawkes – mastering (8)
- Ewan J Phllips – engineering (1, 4, 11)
- Sam de Jong – engineering (2)
- Toby Gad – engineering (3, 10)
- Jenn Decilveo – engineering, vocal engineering (4–8)
- Cian Riordan – engineering (4–8)
- Louis Rogove – engineering (5, 10)
- Fraser T. Smith – engineering (5)
- Adam Yaron – engineering (9)
- Alex Seaver – engineering (11)
- Cameron Gower-Poole – vocal engineering (1)
- Nick "Squids" Squillante – vocal engineering (4–8)
- Big Active – art direction, image, design
- Simon Emmett – photography

== Charts ==
Chart performance for Mother of Pearl
Chart (2026)	Peak position
Belgian Albums (Ultratop Flanders)	84
German Albums (Offizielle Top 100)	36
Scottish Albums (Official Charts)	12
Swiss Albums (Schweizer Hitparade)	42
UK Albums (Official Charts)	26
UK Independent Albums (Official Charts)	2
