= Freya Ridings (album) =

Studio album by Freya Ridings
- Released: 19 July 2019
- Length: 41:52
- Labels: Good Soldier Songs; AWAL
- Producers: Freya Ridings (exec.); Ollie Green; Alex H. N. Gilbert; Carey Willetts; Mark Crew; Dan Priddy; Luke Fitton; Dan Nigro; Yves Rothman; Greg Kurstin; Dave Bassett; Chris Braide

Freya Ridings chronology
You Mean the World to Me (2019)	Freya Ridings (2019)	Blood Orange (2023)

Singles from Freya Ridings
- 1. "Blackout" Released: 5 May 2017; 2. "Lost Without You" Released: 3 November 2017; 3. "Ultraviolet" Released: 15 June 2018; 4. "You Mean the World to Me" Released: 1 March 2019; 5. "Castles" Released: 30 May 2019; 6. "Love Is Fire" Released: 29 November 2019

Freya Ridings is the debut album by English singer-songwriter Freya Ridings, released on 19 July 2019 through Good Soldier Songs and AWAL. It includes the singles "Lost Without You", which reached the UK top ten, as well as the lead single "Blackout", "Ultraviolet", "You Mean the World to Me" and "Castles". It was also supported by the promotional single "Unconditional". It was named one of nine albums to look forward to in 2019 by Smooth Radio. The album debuted inside the top 3 in the UK and Scotland's official charts, and has charted in countries like Germany and Ireland.

== Background ==
Ridings stated that because the album was written over "such a long period of time", its "universal theme" is "loneliness", as she was "isolated" growing up and would play music on her school's pianos at lunchtime and "tell the kind of stories you would tell to a friend to the piano".

== Critical reception ==
Professional ratings
Review scores
Source	Rating
Evening Standard	4/5 stars
Gigwise	8/10
The Guardian	1/5 stars
The Herald	8/10
Hot Press	8/10
Irish Times	4/5 stars

Phoebe Luckhurst from The Evening Standard called Freya Ridings a "lachrymose break-up album" exploring themes of "longing, loss" and heartbreak. She praised Ridings's "extraordinary voice," comparing its power to artists such as Florence Welch and Hannah Reid, while highlighting tracks like "Love Is Fire," "Ultraviolet" and "Poison" for their haunting, soulful and "electrifying" qualities. Writing for The Irish Times, Louise Bruton found that the album was a "juggernaut of a commercial tearjerker" that succeeds through "well-crafted songs and poignant misery." She praised Ridings's ability to capture heartbreak and emotional intensity, noting that her voice "carries years of pain and loss in one note" across the album. The Herald's Kerri-Ann| Roper praised the album as "packed with one hit-worthy song after the next," and concluded it as a "massively impressive debut album."

Gigwise editor Jack Lloyd praised the album's emotional songwriting and described tracks such as "Poison," "Love Is Fire," "Holy Water" and "Wishbone" as powerful moments that showcase her ability to create "devastating" and memorable pop ballads, highlighting her blend of vulnerability, dramatic vocals and radio-ready melodies. Hot Press critic Lucy O'Toole found that Freya Ridings was a "powerful debut from soulful star on the rise. She praised her "commanding, expressive" voice, the album's balance of raw vulnerability, haunting melodies and polished production. Annie Galvin of Paste highlighted tracks like "Poison," "Castles" and "Holy Water," noting a cohesive but sometimes repetitive exploration of heartbreak and longing, while Laura Snapes from The Guardian called Freya Ridings a disappointing debut, rating it 1/5 and describing it as "dull ballads by Florence-alike."

== Commercial performance ==
Freya Ridings debuted on the UK Albums Chart at number three, with sales of 14,779 units.

== Track listing ==
Freya Ridings track listing
No.	Title	Writer(s)	Producer(s)	Length
1.	"Poison"	Freya Ridings	Ollie Green; Carey Willetts; Alex H. N. Gilbert	4:05
2.	"Lost Without You"	Ridings	Green	3:45
3.	"Castles"	Ridings; Daniel Nigro	Nigro; Mark Crew; Dan Priddy; Yves Rothman	3:31
4.	"You Mean the World to Me"	Ridings; Kieron McIntosh	Greg Kurstin	3:12
5.	"Love Is Fire"	Ridings; Michael Busbee	Crew; Priddy; Dave Bassett	3:31
6.	"Holy Water"	Ridings; Matthew Morris; Alexander Evert; Alexander Tirheimer	Green; Willetts; Gilbert	3:43
7.	"Blackout"	Ridings; Ollie Green	Green; Gilbert	2:54
8.	"Ultraviolet"	Ridings; Luke Fitton	Fitton	3:35
9.	"Still Have You"	Ridings; Christopher Braide	Braide; Green; Gilbert	3:53
10.	"Unconditional"	Ridings	Green; Gilbert	3:17
11.	"Elephant"	Ridings; Fitton	Fitton; Green; Gilbert	3:14
12.	"Wishbone"	Ridings; Jonathan Wright	Willetts	3:12
Total length:				41:52

== Charts ==
Chart performance for Freya Ridings
Chart (2019)	Peak position
Australian Digital Albums (ARIA)	19
Austrian Albums (Ö3 Austria)	49
German Albums (Offizielle Top 100)	27
Irish Albums (IRMA)	18
Scottish Albums (Official Charts)	3
Swiss Albums (Schweizer Hitparade)	19
UK Albums (Official Charts)	3
US Heatseekers Albums (Billboard)	16

== Certifications ==
Certifications for Freya Ridings
Region	Certification	Certified units/sales
United Kingdom (BPI)	Gold	100,000^{‡}
^{‡} Sales+streaming figures based on certification alone.
