= Hannes Wader =

German singer-songwriter (born 1942)

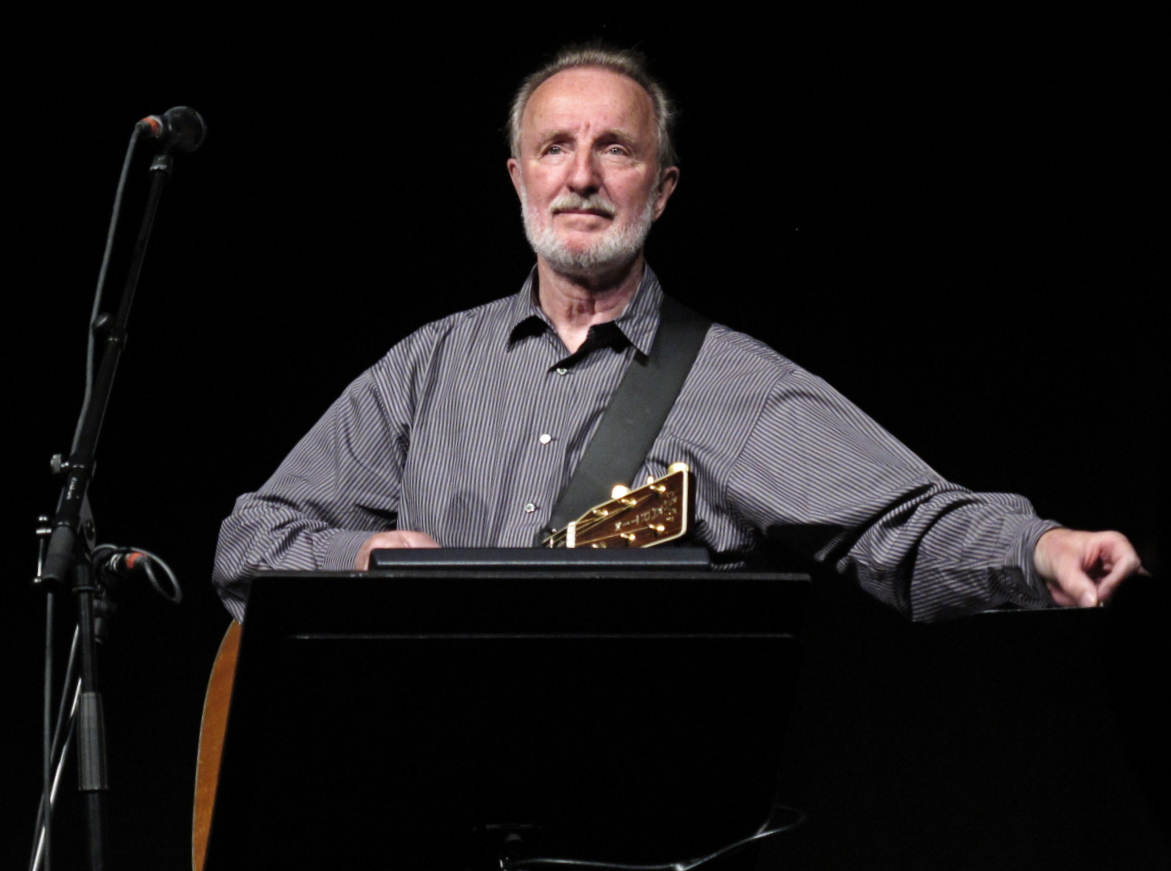
- Wader performing in Augsburg in 2010

Background information
- Born: Hans Eckard Wader; 23 June 1942 (age 84); Bethel, near Bielefeld
- Origin: Bielefeld, Westphalia
- Years active: 1969–present
- Labels: Mercury, Pläne
- Website: www.hanneswader.de

Hannes Wader (born Hans Eckard Wader on 23 June 1942) is a German singer-songwriter ("Liedermacher"). He has been an important figure in German leftist circles since the 1970s, with his songs covering such themes as Socialism, Communism, as well as anti-war music. He both wrote new songs and played versions of older historical works (including Steinitz' historical song book).

== Life and work ==
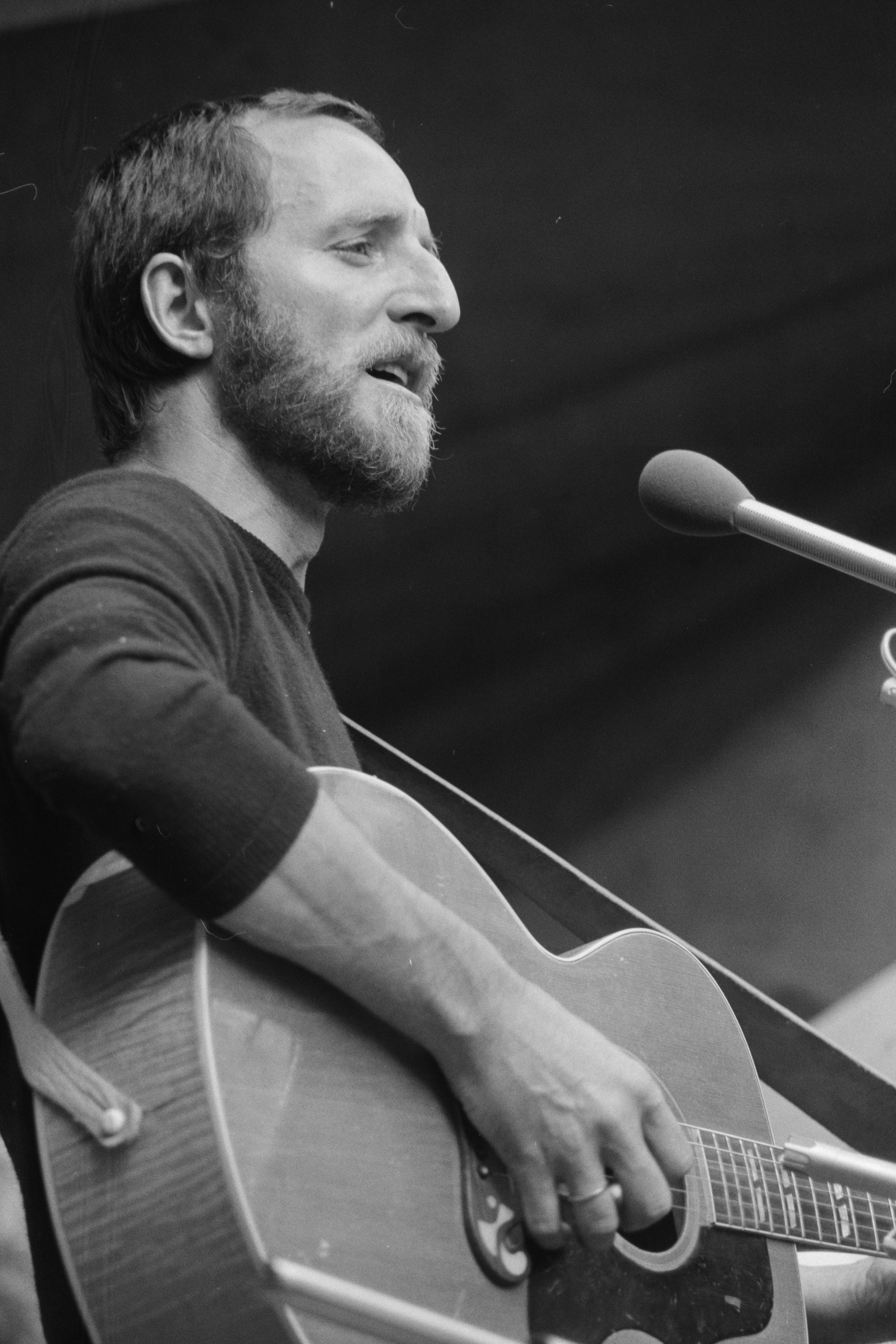
Wader at the 1975 Lenzburg Folkfestival in Switzerland

Wader was born in Bethel, near Bielefeld, Westphalia, Germany. His works are mostly based on German Folk songs. Aside from his own lyrics, he also performs works of famous poets like Eichendorff. He now rarely sings the workers' songs and socialist hymns that used to be a large part of his repertoire. In 1997 he published an album exclusively with songs by Franz Schubert. He also performed translated works from Carl Michael Bellman on the album Liebe, Schnaps & Tod. In 1962 Wader moved to West-Berlin.

In the 1970s, Hannes Wader became one of the stars of the political left through his provocative songs. He was a member of the German Communist Party from 1977 to 1991. Wader even came under suspicions of terrorism because of his song Der Tankerkönig, a spoken song about kidnapping a tycoon.

In 1973, he moved to Struckum, in Nordfriesland, where he published some of his later albums. In 1998, he and his family moved to the Steinburg district of Schleswig-Holstein. He now lives in Kassel.

He has published numerous albums and appeared in open-air concerts and clubs until 2017. His last concert was on 30 November 2017, in Berlin.

== Awards ==
Year	Award	Category
1974	Deutscher Kleinkunstpreis	Chanson
1975	Deutscher Schallplattenpreis	
2012	RUTH (German World Music Award)	Lifetime achievement
2013	Echo	Lifetime achievement

== Performed songs (selected) ==
- "Die Internationale"
- "Die Moorsoldaten"
- "Traum vom Frieden" (Wader's German translation of "Last Night I Had the Strangest Dream" by Ed McCurdy)
- "Es ist an der Zeit" (Wader's German translation of "No Man's Land" by Eric Bogle)
- "Heute hier, morgen dort" ("Day to Day", music by Gary Bolstad titled "Indian Summer", lyrics by Hannes Wader)
- "Kokain" (Wader's German translation of Reverend Gary Davis' "Cocaine Blues")
- "Sag mir, wo die Blumen sind"

== Discography ==
=== Studio albums ===
- 1969: Hannes Wader singt [Hannes Wader sings] (Conträr)
- 1971: Ich hatte mir noch so viel vorgenommen [I still had planned so many things to do] (Mercury)
- 1972: 7 Lieder [7 Songs] (Mercury)
- 1973: Der Rattenfänger [The Pied Piper] (Mercury)
- 1974: Plattdeutsche Lieder [Low German songs] (Mercury)
- 1975: Volkssänger [Folk singer (also People's singer)] (Mercury)
- 1976: Kleines Testament [Little testament] (Mercury)
- 1977: Hannes Wader singt Arbeiterlieder [Hannes Wader sings workers' songs] (Mercury)
- 1978: Hannes Wader singt Shanties [Hannes Wader sings shanties] (Mercury)
- 1979: Wieder unterwegs [On the move again] (Pläne – ARIS)
- 1980: Es ist an der Zeit [It is about time] (Pläne – ARIS)
- 1982: Dass nichts bleibt wie es war [That nothing remains like it used to be] (live) (Pläne – ARIS)
- 1983: Nicht nur ich allein [Not only I] (Pläne – ARIS)
- 1985: Glut am Horizont [Glowing horizon] (Pläne – ARIS)
- 1986: Liebeslieder [Love songs] (Pläne – ARIS)
- 1987: Bis jetzt [Until now] (live) (Mercury)
- 1989: Nach Hamburg [To Hamburg] (Mercury)
- 1990: Hannes Wader singt Volkslieder [Hannes Wader sings folk songs] (Mercury)
- 1991: Nie mehr zurück [Back no more] (Mercury / CD 510 080-2)
- 1992: Schon so lang ‘62 – ‘92 [Already that long] (Compilation) (Mercury)
- 1992: Blick zurück [(A) look back] – Das Beste aus den 80er Jahren (Compilation) (Pläne – ARIS)
- 1995: Zehn Lieder [Ten songs] (Pläne – ARIS)
- 1996: Liebe, Schnaps & Tod – Wader singt Bellman [Love, booze and death – Wader sings Bellman] (feat. R. Mey & K. Hoffmann) (Pläne – ARIS)
- 1996: Professor Jecks Tierlieder-ABC [Professor Jeck's animal songs ABC] (Europa)
- 1997: An dich hab ich gedacht – Wader singt Schubert [I thought of you – Wader sings Schubert] (Pläne – ARIS)
- 1998: Auftritt [Performance] (live with Klaus Weiland & Benjamin Huellenkremer) (Pläne – ARIS)
- 2001: Was für eine Nacht [What a night (also 'Something for one night')] (Konstantin Wecker und Hannes Wader live) (Pläne)
- 2001: Wünsche [Wishes] (Pläne)
- 2003: Das Konzert [The concert] (Wader/Mey/Wecker)
- 2004: ...und es wechseln die Zeiten [And the times are changing] (Pläne)
- 2005: Jahr für Jahr [Year by year] (Pläne)
- 2006: Mal angenommen [Let's assume] (Pläne)
- 2007: Neue Bekannte [New acquitancies (also 'New familiar ones'] (Pläne)
- 2010: Kein Ende in Sicht [No end in sight] (Konstantin Wecker and Hannes Wader live) (Sturm & Klang)
- 2012: Nah Dran [Close to] (Mercury)
- 2013: Old Friends in Concert (Live-CD with Allan Taylor) (Universal Music)
- 2013: Trotz alledem – Lieder aus 50 Jahren 1962–2012 [Despite all that – Songs from 50 Years 1962–2012] (Universal Music)
- 2015: Sing (Mercury)
- 2015: Live (Mercury)
- 2018: Macht's gut (Mercury)
- 2021: Poetenweg (Stockfisch)
- 2022. Noch hier - was ich noch singen wollte (Stockfisch)

=== Compilations ===
- 1999: Der Poet [The poet] (2 CD, Mercury)
- 1999: Der Rebell [The rebel] (2 CD, (Mercury)
- 1999: Der Volkssänger [The folk singer] (2 CD, (Mercury)
