= Waking Up (Freya Ridings and MJ Cole song) =

Single by Freya Ridings & MJ Cole

from the album Waking Up
- Released: 11 December 2018
- Genre: Gothic pop; trip hop; soul
- Length: 3:44
- Label: 892 Recordings
- Songwriters: Freya Ridings, MJ Cole
- Producer: MJ Cole

Freya Ridings singles chronology
"Ultraviolet" (2018)	"Waking Up" (2018)	"You Mean the World to Me" (2019)

MJ Cole singles chronology
"Homerton B (remix)" (2018)	"Waking Up" (2018)

"Waking Up" is a collaborative single by English producer MJ Cole and fellow English singer-songwriter Freya Ridings. It was released as a single on 11 December 2018 and was subsequently included in Cole's Waking Up EP, released on 27 February 2019. The official video for the song was released on the same day.

== Background ==
Freya Ridings says about "Waking Up":

A song I wrote in a stream of consciousness [...]. It came from a deep place of knowing and reclaiming the strength of who really we are, and remembering and connecting to that cosmic power, truth and love again

The song marks a departure from MJ Cole's usual UK garage production towards a softer, less club-oriented and more melodic sound. The song starts with a delicate piano riff and is built over crescendoes; it has been described as a "majestic and atmospheric number, powered by Freya's ethereal and tender vocals". Other reviewers say, "‘Waking Up’ centres itself on the captivating melodies of Ridings to fully encapsulate the raw emotion on display within the piece". Sophia Moss from The Upcoming describes the song as "bassy, ethereal" and "gothic", reminiscent of the sound of the band Evanescence.

== Media and remixes ==
In 2019, French-born DJ Cedric Gervais released an official remix of "Waking Up" (running 3:18).

The song was featured in the 2019 season of British dating show Love Island. In 2021, the song was featured in the American series Behind Her Eyes and peaked at #9 of the Billboard's Top TV Songs chart.

In 2022, the song was featured in an episode of the second season of supernatural teen drama series Fate: The Winx Saga.

== The Waking Up EP ==
Released by MJ Cole on 27 February 2019 on 892 Recordings.

No.	Title	Length
1.	"Waking Up" (with Freya Ridings)	3:44
2.	"Mercy" (feat. Kudu Blue)	4:12
3.	"Serotonin"	4:19

== Chart performance ==
Chart	Peak position
UK Singles Downloads Chart	78
UK Singles Sales Chart	83
Billboard Top TV Songs Chart	9
