= You Mean the World to Me (EP) =

EP by Freya Ridings
- Released: 1 March 2019
- Length: 16:45
- Label: Good Soldier; AWAL; Capitol
- Producer: Greg Kurstin; Carey Willetts; Ollie Green; Luke Fitton; Alex Gilbert

Freya Ridings chronology
Live at Omeara (2018)	You Mean the World to Me (2019)	Freya Ridings (2019)

Singles from You Mean the World to Me
- 1. "Blackout" Released: 5 May 2017; 2. "Lost Without You" Released: 3 November 2017; 3. "Ultraviolet" Released: 15 June 2018; 4. "You Mean the World to Me" Released: 1 March 2019

You Mean the World to Me is the debut extended play (EP) by British singer-songwriter Freya Ridings. It was released through labels Good Soldier Songs, AWAL and Capitol Records on 1 March 2019, alongside the single release of the title track "You Mean the World to Me". The EP's second single, "Lost Without You", was a commercial success, peaking at nine on the UK Singles Chart in October 2018.

== Track listing ==
No.	Title	Writer(s)	Producer(s)	Length
1.	"You Mean the World to Me"	Freya Ridings; Kieron Mcintosh	Greg Kurstin	3:12
2.	"Lost Without You"	Ridings	Ollie Green	3:45
3.	"Wishbone"	Ridings; Jonathan Mark Wright	Carey Willetts	3:11
4.	"Ultraviolet"	Ridings; Luke Fitton	Fitton	3:35
5.	"Blackout"	Ridings; Green	Green; Alex Gilbert	3:35
Total length:				16:45
