= Freya Ridings =

English singer, songwriter and multi-instrumentalist (born 1994)

- Freya Ridings performing live at Pryzm, Kingston in 2023
- Born: Freya Olivia Rose Ridings; 18 April 1994 (age 32); London, England
- Occupations: Singer; musician; songwriter
- Spouse: Ewan J Phillips (m. 2022)
- Parent: Richard Ridings (father)
- Musical career
- Genres: Pop; folk; soul
- Occupations: Singer; songwriter
- Instruments: Guitar; piano; vocals
- Years active: 2016–present
- Label: Good Soldier
- Website: Official website

Freya Olivia Rose Ridings (born 18 April 1994) is an English singer, songwriter and multi-instrumentalist. Ridings rose to prominence in 2017 with her ballad, "Lost Without You", which became a top ten hit on the UK Singles Chart. She followed this with the release of her debut extended play, You Mean the World to Me (2019). Her self-titled debut album was supported by the single "Castles", which would become her international breakthrough.

== Early and personal life ==
Freya Olivia Rose Ridings was raised in North London and grew up in Palmers Green. She is the daughter of English actor and musician Richard Ridings, and learned guitar from watching him play. Her mother, playwright Cathy Jansen-Ridings, is three quarters Irish and one quarter Scottish. She attended St Christopher School in Letchworth, followed by the BRIT School from the age of 16.

Ridings has dyslexia. In November 2022, she married folk singer Ewan J. Phillips after a two-and-a-half month engagement.

== Career ==
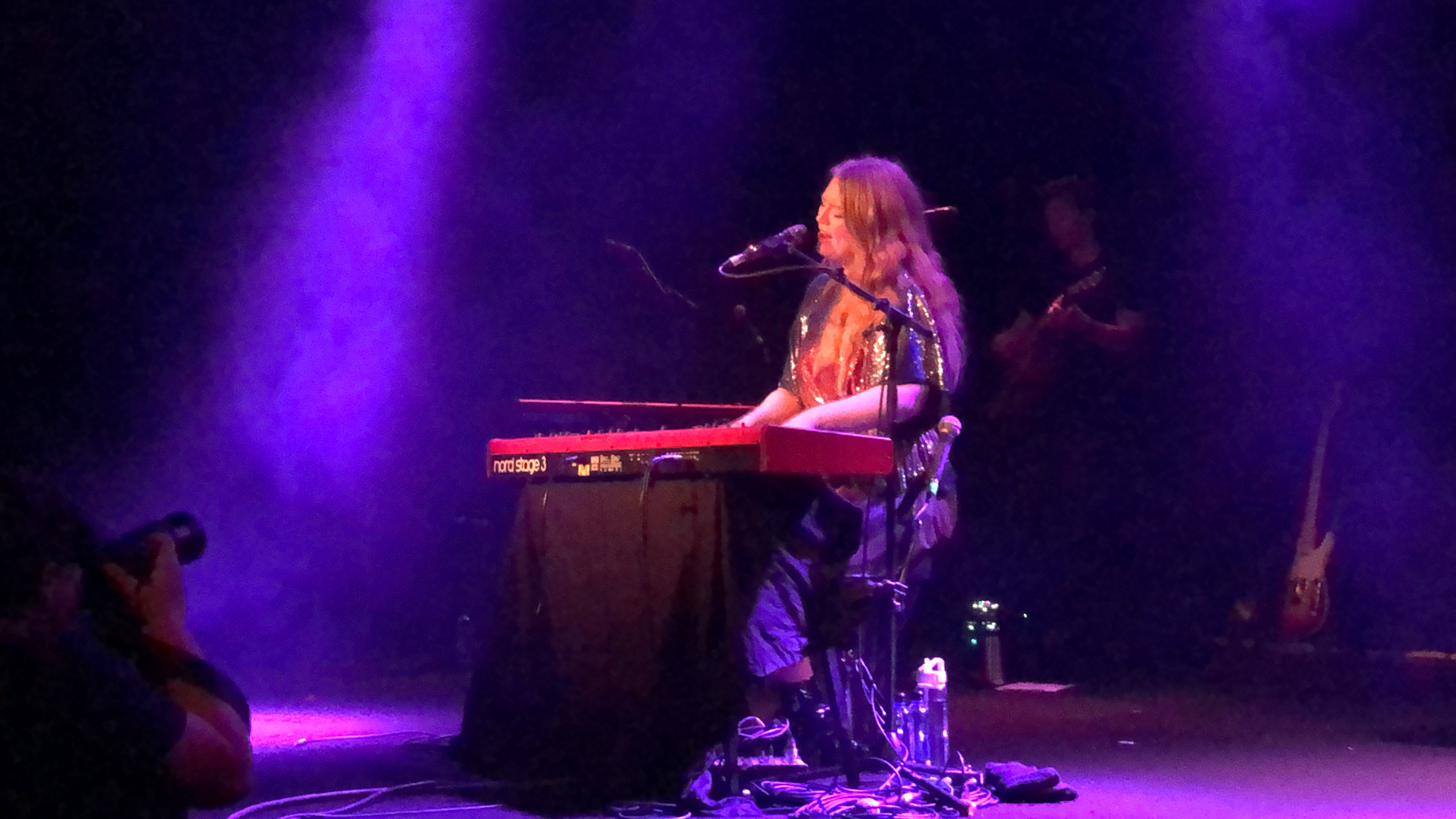
Ridings performing in Sydney, Australia in March 2020.

Ridings released her debut single, "Blackout", on 5 May 2017. She released the single "Maps" (a cover of the Yeah Yeah Yeahs hit) on 30 June 2017. On 22 September 2017, she released her debut live album Live at St Pancras Old Church. After releasing the album she went on to her first full headline tour in the UK. She spent most of 2017 supporting the likes of Tears for Fears, Tash Sultana and Lewis Capaldi. She released "Lost Without You" on 3 November 2017. The song peaked at number 9 in the UK Singles Chart, after being featured on the reality show Love Island in July 2018. It was subsequently chosen by Scott Mills' as his 'Tune of the Week' on his Radio 1 show in August 2018. She released her second live album, Live at Omeara, on 30 March 2018. She released the single "Ultraviolet" on 15 June 2018.

In 2019, she released the single "You Mean the World to Me", which was re-produced by Greg Kurstin, followed by an extended play of the same name. She also announced her self-titled debut album, with an original release date of 31 May 2019, but it was pushed back to 19 July 2019.

On 29 June 2019, Ridings played a set on the John Peel Stage at the 2019 Glastonbury Festival, after the festival founder Michael Eavis personally attended one of her concerts in Bristol.

In March 2020, Ridings toured Australia for the first time, performing shows in Sydney and Melbourne.

In January 2023, Ridings released her first single in three years, "Weekends". This was followed by the announcement that her second studio album, Blood Orange, would be released on 5 May 2023; this was subsequently brought forward to 28 April 2023 and would coincide with a number of album release parties at several venues around the UK.

Ridings was due to perform at the Coronation Concert, marking the coronation of King Charles III in May 2023, but she pulled out at the last minute after contracting an unknown illness.

In June 2023, Ridings co-wrote (alongside her husband) and performed the song "Rise" for the teen comedy film Ruby Gillman, Teenage Kraken.

On 9 November 2024, Ridings' single "I Can't Hear It Now" was featured in the first act on the second season of the League of Legends animated series Arcane.

On 9 August 2025, Ridings performed at the Glastonbury Extravaganza as support act to The Script.

On 8 October 2025, Ridings was announced as the support act for OneRepublic on their 2026 tour of Australia and New Zealand, after original opener Zara Larsson pulled out due to a scheduling conflict.

== Discography ==
=== Studio albums ===
Title	Details	Peak chart positions						Certifications
Title	Details	UK	AUT	GER	IRE	SCO	SWI	Certifications
Freya Ridings	Released: 19 July 2019; Label: Good Soldier; Formats: CD, LP, digital download, streaming	3	49	27	18	3	19	BPI: Gold
Blood Orange	Released: 28 April 2023; Label: Good Soldier, AWAL; Formats: CD, LP, digital download, streaming	7	71	18	82	9	28	
Mother of Pearl	Released: 29 May 2026; Label: BMG; Formats: CD, LP, digital download, streaming	26	—	36	—	12	42	

=== Live albums ===
Title	Details	Peak chart positions
Title	Details	SCO
Live at St Pancras Old Church	Released: 22 September 2017; Label: Good Soldier; Format: Digital download	—
Live at Omeara	Released: 30 March 2018; Label: Good Soldier; Format: Digital download	75

=== Extended plays ===
Title	Details
You Mean the World to Me	Released: 1 March 2019; Label: Good Soldier; Format: Digital download, streaming

=== Singles ===
Title	Year	Peak chart positions										Certifications	Album
Title	Year	UK	AUS	AUT	BEL (FL)	GER	IRE	SCO	SWI	UKR Air.	US AC	Certifications	Album
"Blackout"	2017	—	—	—	—	—	—	—	—	—	—		Freya Ridings
"Lost Without You"	2017	9	—	—	53	—	16	5	—	—	16	BPI: 3× Platinum; ARIA: Platinum; BVMI: Gold; MC: Platinum; IFPI SWI: Platinum	Freya Ridings
"Ultraviolet"	2018	—	—	—	—	—	—	—	—	—	—		Freya Ridings
"Waking Up" (with MJ Cole)	2018	—	—	—	—	—	—	—	—	—	—		Waking Up EP
"You Mean the World to Me"	2019	57	—	—	—	—	78	26	—	—	15	BPI: Silver	Freya Ridings
"Castles"	2019	16	20	28	12	51	12	2	14	—	15	BPI: Platinum; ARIA: 3× Platinum; BVMI: Gold; IFPI AUT: Platinum; IFPI SWI: Platinum; MC: Gold	Freya Ridings
"Love Is Fire"	2019	—	—	—	—	—	—	25	—	—	—		Freya Ridings
"Weekends"	2023	31	—	—	—	—	100	—	—	3	—		Blood Orange
"Face in the Crowd"	2023	—	—	—	—	—	—	—	—	—	—		Blood Orange
"Can I Jump?"	2023	—	—	—	—	—	—	—	—	—	—		Blood Orange
"Perfect"	2023	—	—	—	—	—	—	—	—	—	—		Blood Orange
"I Feel Love"	2023	—	—	—	—	—	—	—	—	—	—		Blood Orange
"Rise"	2023	—	—	—	—	—	—	—	—	—	—		Ruby Gillman, Teenage Kraken and Blood Orange (live at Apollo)
"Wicker Woman"	2025	—	—	—	—	—	—	—	—	—	—		Mother of Pearl
"Wild Horse"	2026	—	—	—	—	—	—	—	—	—	—		Mother of Pearl
"I Have Always Loved You"	2026	—	—	—	—	—	—	—	—	—	—		Mother of Pearl
"Dancing in the Kitchen"	2026	—	—	—	—	—	—	—	—	—	—		Mother of Pearl
"—" denotes a single that did not chart or was not released in that territory.

=== Promotional singles ===
Title	Year	Album
"Maps"	2017	Non-album single
"Unconditional"	2019	Freya Ridings

== Awards and nominations ==
Year	Award	Category	Result	Ref
2020	BRIT Awards	British Female Solo Artist	Nominated	
