= You Mean the World to Me (Freya Ridings song) =

Single by Freya Ridings

from the EP You Mean the World to Me and the album Freya Ridings
- B-side: "Wishbone"
- Released: 1 March 2019
- Length: 3:12
- Label: Good Soldier; Capitol
- Songwriters: Freya Ridings; Kieron Mcintosh
- Producer: Greg Kurstin

Freya Ridings singles chronology
"Waking Up" (2018)	"You Mean the World to Me" (2019)	"Castles" (2019)

Music video
- "You Mean the World to Me" on YouTube

"You Mean the World to Me" is a song by British singer-songwriter Freya Ridings. It was released as a single, alongside Ridings' debut EP You Mean the World to Me, on 1 March 2019, through record labels Good Soldier Songs and Capitol Records, being the fourth single from the project. The song was written by Ridings and Kieron Mcintosh, and produced by American musician Greg Kurstin. The song is also included on Ridings' debut album, Freya Ridings, as the fourth single of the album.

== Music video ==
The single was released alongside a music video for the track. The video was directed by Game of Thrones actress Lena Headey, and features Game of Thrones actress Maisie Williams.

== Track listing ==
CD single
No.	Title	Length
1.	"You Mean the World to Me"	3:12
2.	"Wishbone"	3:11

== Charts ==
Chart (2019)	Peak position
Ireland (IRMA)	78
Scottish Singles Sales (Official Charts)	26
UK Singles (Official Charts)	57
US Adult Contemporary (Billboard)	15

== Certifications ==
Region	Certification	Certified units/sales
United Kingdom (BPI)	Silver	200,000^{‡}
^{‡} Sales+streaming figures based on certification alone.
