= Heute hier, morgen dort =

Song by Hannes Wader

from the album 7 Lieder
- Recorded: 1972
- Producer: Melody taken from the song "Indian Summer" (Gary Bolstad)

Heute hier, morgen dort (German for "Today here, tomorrow there" or "day to day") is a song by Hannes Wader.

The song first appeared in 1972 on his album 7 Lieder (7 Songs). The melody comes from the song Indian Summer by the American musician Gary Bolstad who studied veterinary medicine in Berlin in the 1960s and performed in folk clubs. The German text is by Hannes Wader.

In 1997, Bolstad translated Wader's text back to English. Wader sang the result Day to Day in 1998 on the live album: Hannes Wader. In 2001 he sang the original version Indian Summer for the album Wünsche for the first time.

With its catchy melody Heute hier, morgen dort came to be a modern German folk song. The title of the song has become a common expression in German language. The song describes the lifestyle of a person who is always on the move, never asks for "yesterday and tomorrow", but occasionally has "heavy dreams". The "I" expresses its external and internal mobility in the light of the general principle of constant change in the world to which it gives itself in its way of life.

The title and lyrics of the song are based on the tradition and way of life of the Wandervogel movement of the early 20th century. In general, songwriters are often associated with the tradition of traveling singers, which makes appear Heute hier, morgen dort as a kind of anthem of this group of artists. In this sense, Michael Köhler in the Frankfurter Allgemeine Zeitung called the song a "song about the multiple impressions that someone like him [sc. Wader] encounters in unsteady touring life."

Since 1972 Wader always starts his concerts with this piece. Only in the meantime, when it became too monotonous for him, he played Gut wieder hier zu sein as the first piece, but changed again after two years to Heute hier, morgen dort. He said that this was done at the request of his audience and that he does not plan to change this again.

== Cover version ==
A French version of the song was created under the title Je suis ci, je suis là by the German-Belgian chanson singer Didier Caesar from Konstanz as commissioned work. It was approved by Hannes Wader, who also speaks French. The version is used in meetings between twinning companies and when traveling to France in the context of pupil exchange.
