= Samy Deluxe discography =

Discography of German rapper Samy Deluxe

This discography is an overview of the musical works of the German rapper Samy Deluxe, as well as his pseudonyms Samsemilia, Wickeda MC, The Big Baus of the Nauf and Mr. Sorge. He was the owner of the label "Deluxe Records" and is one of the most commercially successful German rapper with over one million records sold.

== Albums ==
=== Studio albums ===
Year	Title	Peak chart positions			Release date
Year	Title	Germany	Austria	Switzerland	Release date
2001	Samy Deluxe	2	31	55	20 April 2001
2003	Wer hätte das gedacht? with Afrob a.k.a. ASD	5	34	24	28 March 2003
2004	Verdammtnochma!	2	10	9	23 August 2004
2009	Dis wo ich herkomm	3	13	4	27 March 2009
2011	SchwarzWeiss	1	9	2	29 July 2011
2012	Verschwörungstheorien mit schönen Melodien a.k.a. Herr Sorge	43	—	—	14 December 2012
2014	Männlich	3	14	8	21 March 2014
2015	Blockbasta with Afrob a.k.a. ASD	4	16	6	3 July 2015
2016	Berühmte letzte Worte	4	11	5	29 April 2016
2019	Hochkultur	24		28	20 December 2019
2023	Hochkultur 2	1	—	24	11 August 2023

=== Live albums ===
Year	Title	Peak chart positions			Release date
Year	Title	Germany	Austria	Switzerland	Release date
2018	SaMTV Unplugged	2	6	5	31 August 2018

=== Mixtapes / EPs ===
Year	Title	Peak chart positions			Release date
Year	Title	Germany	Austria	Switzerland	Release date
2005	So Deluxe, So Glorious	88	—	—	7 October 2005
2006	Big Baus of the Nauf	45	—	96	31 March 2006
2006	Deluxe von Kopf bis Fuss	73	—	92	22 December 2006
2009	Der letzte Tanz	98	—	72	11 December 2009
2013	Perlen vor die Säue	12	19	12	1 November 2013
2014	Gute alte Zeit	12	37	27	10 October 2014
2017	Deluxe Edition	29	72	63	24 November 2017

== Singles ==
Year	Title Album	Peak chart positions			Release date
Year	Title Album	Germany	Austria	Switzerland	Release date
2001	Hab’ gehört... Samy Deluxe	26	—	—	26 March 2001
2001	Weck mich auf Samy Deluxe	4	16	14	10 September 2001
2003	Sneak Preview; Wer hätte das gedacht?	12	48	46	24 February 2003
2003	Sag mir wo die Party ist! Wer hätte das gedacht?	92	—	—	26 May 2003
2003	Hey du (Nimm dir Zeit); Wer hätte das gedacht?	67	—	—	11 August 2003
2004	Zurück; Verdammtnochma!	22	53	36	26 July 2004
2004	Warum? Verdammtnochma!	56	—	—	18 October 2004
2005	Generation; Verdammtnochma!	43	—	—	24 January 2005
2005	Let's Go! Deluxe Records – Let’s Go!	35	52	95	25 November 2005
2009	Bis die Sonne rauskommt Dis wo ich herkomm	38	60	—	6 March 2009
2009	Musik um durch den Tag zu komm / Stumm (Xenja); Dis wo ich herkomm	87	—	—	24 July 2009
2011	Poesie Album; SchwarzWeiss	62	—	—	15 July 2011
2011	Zurück zu wir SchwarzWeiss	94	75	—	19 September 2011
2016	Haus am Mehr; Berühmte letzte Worte	68	67	53	6 May 2016
2016	Kristallnacht; Sing meinen Song – Das Tauschkonzert Vol. 3	93	—	—	13 May 2016

=== Other singles ===
- 2001: Internetional Love
- 2001: Sell Out Samy
- 2009: Superheld
- 2011: Hände hoch
- 2011: Eines Tages
- 2012: Zukunft Vorbye
- 2013: Amnesie International
- 2013: Du & Ich
- 2013: Herz gebrochen (Scherben)
- 2013: Finderlohn
- 2013: Perlen vor die Säue
- 2014: Traum
- 2017: Allein in der Überzahl
