= Castles (song) =

Single by Freya Ridings

from the album Freya Ridings
- Released: 30 May 2019
- Length: 3:31
- Label: Good Soldier; Capitol
- Songwriters: Freya Ridings; Daniel Nigro
- Producers: Dan Nigro; Mark Crew; Dan Priddy; Yves Rothman Alex H.N Gilbert & Ollie Green

Freya Ridings singles chronology
"You Mean the World to Me" (2019)	"Castles" (2019)	"Love Is Fire" (2019)

Music video
- "Castles" on YouTube

"Castles" is a song by English singer-songwriter Freya Ridings. It was released as a single on 30 May 2019, through record labels Good Soldier Songs and Capitol Records, as the fifth single from her debut studio album, Freya Ridings. The song was written by Ridings and Dan Nigro, the latter of whom also produced the song along with Yves Rothman, additional production was done by Mark Crew, and Dan Priddy, Alex H.N Gilbert & Ollie Green.

== Background and composition ==
Produced by Dan Nigro, Mark Crew, Dan Priddy, Yves Rothman, the song was written by Ridings and Nigro. The song additionally features background vocals by American singer-songwriter Zella Day as well as Brendan Reilly, Emily Holligan, Kate Brady, and Simone Daly Richards.

The song was written after Ridings went through "one of the most brutal breakups of her life", stating that she wanted to use the incredible amount of pain to create something that is "better than she thinks she can be and what that person thought she could be".

"Castles" is composed in the key of E major and at a tempo of 117 beats per minute (BPM). Ridings' vocal range spans from B_{3} to B_{4}.

== Music video and lyric video ==
=== Music video ===
A music video to accompany the release of "Castles" was first released onto YouTube on 10 July 2019 at a total length of three minutes and twenty-eight seconds. The music video was filmed in Spitalfields, London. The iconic rooftop scenes were shot at 81 Brick Lane.

=== Lyric video ===
The lyric video for "Castles" was released on 30 May 2019.

== Live performances ==
- Ridings performed the song on the Australian breakfast television program Sunrise on 9 March 2020, in her first visit to the country.

== Track listing ==
Digital download
No.	Title	Length
1.	"Castles"	3:31

Digital download
No.	Title	Length
1.	"Castles" (Acoustic)	3:19

CD single
No.	Title	Length
1.	"Castles"	3:31
2.	"Castles" (Acoustic)	3:19

== Charts ==
=== Weekly charts ===
Chart (2019–2020)	Peak position
Australia (ARIA)	20
Austria (Ö3 Austria Top 40)	28
Belgium (Ultratop 50 Flanders)	12
Belgium (Ultratop 50 Wallonia)	20
Croatia (HRT)	14
France (SNEP)	71
Germany (GfK)	51
Iceland (Tónlistinn)	38
Ireland (IRMA)	12
Israel (Media Forest)	13
New Zealand Hot Singles (RMNZ)	19
Scotland Singles (OCC)	2
Slovakia Airplay (ČNS IFPI)	8
Slovenia (SloTop50)	10
Switzerland (Schweizer Hitparade)	14
UK Singles (OCC)	16
US Adult Alternative Airplay (Billboard)	38
US Adult Contemporary (Billboard)	15

=== Year-end charts ===
Chart (2020)	Position
Australia (ARIA)	80
Belgium (Ultratop Flanders)	40
Switzerland (Schweizer Hitparade)	90
US Adult Contemporary (Billboard)	44

== Certifications ==
Region	Certification	Certified units/sales
Australia (ARIA)	3× Platinum	210,000^{‡}
Austria (IFPI Austria)	Platinum	30,000^{‡}
Brazil (Pro-Música Brasil)	Gold	20,000^{‡}
Canada (Music Canada)	Gold	40,000^{‡}
France (SNEP)	Platinum	200,000^{‡}
Germany (BVMI)	Gold	200,000^{‡}
New Zealand (RMNZ)	2× Platinum	60,000^{‡}
Switzerland (IFPI Switzerland)	Platinum	20,000^{‡}
United Kingdom (BPI)	Platinum	600,000^{‡}
^{‡} Sales+streaming figures based on certification alone.

== Release history ==
Region	Date	Format(s)	Version	Label(s)	Ref
Various	30 May 2019	Digital download; streaming	Original	Good Soldier Songs	
Various	5 July 2019	Digital download; streaming	Acoustic	Good Soldier Songs	
Various	2 August 2019	Digital download; streaming	Sam Feldt remix	Good Soldier Songs	
United States	26 August 2019	Hot adult contemporary	Original	Good Soldier Songs; Capitol Records	
United States	23 September 2019	Triple A (AAA)	Original	Good Soldier Songs; Capitol Records	
