= Downtown Music Holdings =

American music services company

- Industry: Music publishing
- Founded: 2007; 19 years ago
- Founder: Justin Kalifowitz
- Headquarters: New York City, U.S.
- Area served: Worldwide
- Key people: Justin Kalifowitz (Executive chairman) Andrew Bergman (CEO) Alan Goodstadt (CFO)
- Services: Music rights management
- Owner: Universal Music Group
- Parent: Virgin Music Group
- Divisions: Downtown Music Services; Songtrust; CD Baby; AdRev; Fuga; Downtown Neighbouring Rights; Downtown Studios
- Website: www.downtownmusic.com

Downtown Music Holdings is a New York City-based rights management and music services company with ten businesses divided into two verticals, Creator and Business (Downtown Music). On February 20, 2026, it was announced that it had been acquired by Virgin Music Group, a unit of Universal Music Group.

== History ==
Founded as Downtown Music Publishing in 2007 by Justin Kalifowitz, the company developed its business model to address the consolidation of the music publishing industry as well as the new technologies which impacted songwriters and copyright holders.

Three years after Downtown Music Studios opened, it formally launched Songtrust as a business unit in 2011, expanding its royalty collection platform capabilities beyond the parent publishing firm. Until January 2013, Downtown was the owner of the record label Downtown Records.

In 2014, a year after opening an office in Los Angeles, the firm expanded to Nashville and also founded Downtown Music Benelux, an Amsterdam-based unit established in collaboration with Hot Streak Music, a division of Cloud 9 Music.

Before establishing Neighboring Rights in 2016, the American company bought the London-based music publisher Eagle-i Music and founded Downtown UK the previous year. With its acquisition in 2019 by Downtown for $200 million, AVL Digital Group came to own CD Baby, Soundrop, AdRev, and DashGo.

In August 2021, Kalifowitz stepped down as CEO and became its executive chairman.

In December 2024, Universal Music reported its interest in buying the company. When the transaction was finalized on February 20, 2026, it came under the ownership of Virgin Media Group.

== Divisions ==
=== Downtown Music Publishing ===
The publishing division, ranked in Billboard's Music Publishing Top 10, is Downtown's primary focus. In addition to administering copyrights, Downtown Music Publishing's services include royalty collection, songwriter development, catalog marketing, neighbouring rights, and financing services. It arranges co-writing opportunities and places its songwriter's compositions in film, television, advertising, and video game productions. Downtown writers have written hit songs for artists including Beyoncé, Bruno Mars, Carrie Underwood, Katy Perry, Keith Urban, Rihanna, and Selena Gomez, and, among others, their compositions have been used in the Hunger Games series, Girls, and Grand Theft Auto. Brands that have featured spots from Downtown writers include the NFL, Coca-Cola, Apple Inc, Budweiser and Amazon.

Downtown has formed partnerships with digital service providers including YouTube, Pandora Radio and LyricFind to directly process data and payments owed to songwriters and publishers. It provides analysis for songwriters, managers, and lawyers, allowing writers to review and export statements, see their account balance, create reports for different periods by income over different territories, and access details of each royalty line.

In 2016, Downtown Music Publishing was nominated for Music Business Worldwide's Publisher of the Year Award. The company appeared on the Billboard 2014 list of the Top 10 Publishers.

Downtown acquired Salli Isaak Music and Salli Isaak Songs in 2018, giving the publisher the rights to works by One Direction, Madonna, and Sam Smith.

In May 2019, Downtown acquired the 1987 to 2017 catalogue of Belgian music publisher Strictly Confidential.

In May 2020, Downtown acquired two publishers: Good Soldier Songs (home of The 1975), and the South African Sheer Music.

In April 2021, Downtown sold its song publishing roster and catalogue to Concord, though Downtown will continue to represent the publishing rights for several artists including John Lennon and Yoko Ono, Miles Davis, John Prine, and the Wu-Tang Clan.

=== Songtrust ===
Songtrust is a global music rights management software platform that was founded by Downtown CEO Justin Kalifowitz and CSO Joe Conyers III. Launched in 2011, it services Downtown Music Service's catalog and provides royalty collection services for creators all over the world. The platform enables creators at all levels to recover their royalties directly from over 90 countries and from more than 20,000 unique income sources worldwide. Songtrust also has business partnerships and provides publishing royalty collection with companies such as sister company CD Baby, Secretly Publishing, The Orchard and Stones Throw Publishing.

In January 2018, Molly Neuman, former drummer for riot grrrl band Bratmobile, joined Songtrust from her previous role as the first head of music for crowdfunding website Kickstarter. In October 2019 Molly Neuman was named President of Songtrust.

=== CD Baby ===
CD Baby is an independent music monetization and distribution service based in Portland. They help DIY artists monetize their music through streaming, downloads, vinyl & CD sales, video monetization, sync licensing and publishing royalties (through partnership with sister company, Songtrust). CD Baby also runs DIY distribution service, Soundrop. CD Baby was acquired by Downtown through the acquisition of AVL Digital in 2019.

=== Adrev ===
Adrev is a digital content and rights monetization service on Youtube, Facebook and other online video platforms. AdRev is a YouTube partner company that was initially designed to help creators and music rights holders monetize their work with ad placements on other channels using their content. Adrev was founded in 2011 and is based in Los Angeles. Adrev was acquired by Downtown through the acquisition of AVL Digital in 2019.

=== Fuga ===
Fuga logo

Fuga (stylized in all caps) is a B2B tech and music service company based in The Netherlands. Fuga was acquired by Downtown in January 2020. Fuga provides music distribution and marketing services to labels and management teams around the world.

=== Downtown Music Studios ===
Downtown Music Studios was a two studio recording facility located in SoHo, Manhattan. Opened in 2008, the studios were designed by Martin Pilchner and are overseen by chief engineer Zach Hancock. The studio is currently closed, timing of reopening is unknown.

=== Neighbouring Rights ===
Through its direct affiliations with sound recording performance rights services, Downtown formally launched a Neighbouring Rights offering globally in 2016. The division enables Downtown to make certain that artists are compensated when the recorded performance of their songs are performed in public on satellite and online radio services such as Pandora.

== Advocacy ==
Downtown's executives sit on the board of the National Music Publishers Association (NMPA) in the United States, an organization which safeguards and promotes the interests of music publishers and songwriters to government bodies, the music industry, the media, and the public. Additionally, the company recently teamed with the Berklee College of Music's Institute for Creative Entrepreneurship (BerkleeICE) to collaborate on the Open Music Initiative in an effort to achieve fair payment for songwriters through digital licensing.

Kalifowitz is a co-founder of NY is Music, a coalition of over 200 organizations advancing the importance of music in economic development, culture, and education across the state. NY is Music is credited with the passage of the 2015 New York State Tax Credit for Music production.
