= Geff Harrison =

British musician

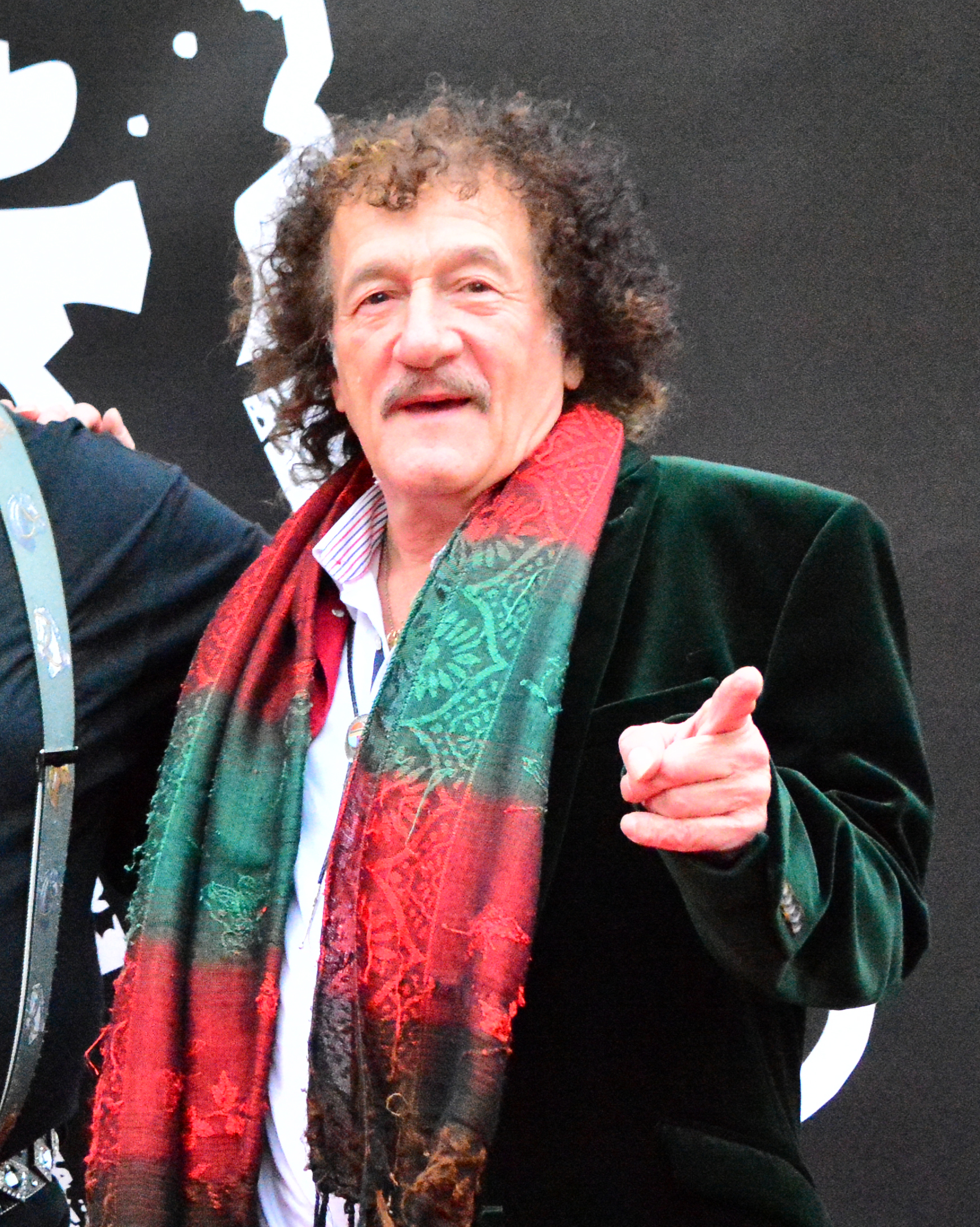
- Harrison in 2015

Background information
- Born: 24 August 1946 (age 78); Salford, England
- Genres: Rock
- Occupation(s): Singer, composer, producer, songwriter
- Years active: 1966–present
- Website: geff-harrison.de

Geff Harrison (born 24 August 1946) is an English singer, composer and musician, known for performing with bands Kin Ping Meh and Twenty Sixty Six and Then.

== Career ==
=== Early years ===
Harrison started his musical career at the beginning of 1960s in the Manchester and Salford areas. In 1963, he started performing with The Chasers, who opened for The Beatles, The Searchers, John Mayall, Long John Baldrey, Rod Stewart, and John Lee Hooker. In 1966, he joined the band Some Other Guys, visiting Germany with them in 1967 to perform shows to soldiers stationed there.

=== In Germany ===
After Some Other Guys, in 1968, Harrison joined to the hard rock band I Drive and later on joined Twenty Sixty Six and Then. In 1973, he joined Kin Ping Meh, replacing singer Werner Stephan. He sang on Tritonus 1976 second album Between The Universes. After three years, Harrison decided to pursue a solo career, with his album Salford, being released in 1976. Sounds magazine commented that: "Such versatile talent is rarely published by us". After founding the Geff Harrison Band in 1977, Harrison recorded hits like "Death of a Clown", "Salford", "Do You Miss Me", "Bad New York City", and "Eve of Destruction". He also toured with Demon Thor (Thomas Fortmann) and Lenny MacDowell.

Harrison worked for five years with Dieter Bohlen, who produced the album Reach for the Sky under the pseudonym Richie West. Harrison also collaborated on the lyrics of songs for Modern Talking, including hits like "You Can Win If You Want" and "Cheri Cheri Lady", as well as others that were later used for CCCatch. Harrison wrote lyrics for sixteen songs for German band Modern Talking, supporting Bohlen with the grammar and verse ideas. Harrison was never credited on the album for his contributions, leading to a conflict with Bohlen. In February 1986, Harrison filed a lawsuit against Bohlen for the rights of the Modern Talking songs. The court ruled that both Bohlen and Harrison wrote songs for Modern Talking, and the relevant recording contracting was modified accordingly.

=== Subsequent years ===
Harrison worked as producer and composer for several artists, including Herman's Hermits. He also produced an album with pop singer Taco Ockerse and composed songs for the musicals Yesterday and Time After Time. In 2003, Harrison contributed to the lyrics and composition of the Mountain Rock Symphony project with the artist and composer Wolfgang Zabba Lindner. Later on, Harrison released an album with Peter Panka and Werner Nadolny of the group Jane, called Harrison Panka Nadolny Band.

In 2005, Kin Ping Meh, reunited with Harrison was the lead singer. Since 2011, Harrison has been the lead singer of the band The Glowballs, playing rock and roll classics of the 1950s and 1960s.

In 2015, he released the solo album Purple Magic, and followed it in 2016 with two releases: the solo album Forever Young and an album with The Glowballs.

In 2017, Harrison and Manne Kraski wrote a song about the exit of Great Britain from the European Union, released as the single "Brexit (Mind The Gap)".

In 2018, Harrison was a contestant on the German version of The Voice Senior. He sang "A Whiter Shade of Pale" at his Blind Audition with all four coaches turning for him. He chose Yvonne Catterfeld's team. He performed "The First Cut Is the Deepest" at the Sing Offs. Even though his voice had been praised by both the audience and media before, he did not advance to the finals as Catterfeld did not pick him.

== Discography ==
=== Albums ===
- Anno 1972 – Demon Thor (1972)
- Reflections on the Future – Twenty Sixty Six and Then (1972)
- Kin Ping Meh 3 – Kin Ping Meh (1973)
- Virtues & Sins – Kin Ping Meh (1974)
- Between the Universes - Tritonus (1976)
- Concrete – Kin Ping Meh (1976)
- Salford – Geff Harrison (1976)
- ... And the London Symphonic-Rock Orchestra – Geff Harrison (1977)
- Together – Geff Harrison Band (1977)
- Money Talks – Geff Harrison (1979)
- Voice – Geff Harrison (1980)
- Hello Here I Am – Geff Harrison (1998)
- Soul Explosion – Soul Brothers (2003)
- Skin Deep – Harrison Panka Nadolny Band (2006)
- Purple Magic – Geff Harrison (2015)
- Forever Young – Geff Harrison (2016)
- The Glowballs – The Glowballs (2016)

=== Singles ===
- "No Reply" – Geff Harrison (1973)
- "Death of a Clown" – Geff Harrison (1976)
- "It's Not Easy for a Singer in a Rock'n Roll" – feat. LSRC (1977)
- "Stay with Me" – Geff Harrison (1977)
- "Roller Coaster" – Geff Harrison (1979)
- "Do You Miss Me" – Geff Harrison (1981)
- "Reach for the Sky" – Richie West (1981)
- "Eve of Destruction" – Geff Harrison (1983)
- "I Was Born a Rolling Stone" – Geff Harrison (1985)
- "Kung Fu Clan" – Corona Taps feat. Mike Mareen (1986)
- "Fly to Moscow" – Modern Trouble (1987)
- "Bad New York City" – Geff Harrison (1987)
- "Roadrunner" – U.K. feat. Mike Mareen (1987)
- "S.O.S. – Save Our Seoul" – Modern Trouble (1988)
- "Don't Forget Ben Johnson" – Fair-Play (1988)
- "With a Touch from Your Heart" – Chapter One (1988)
- "Stay with Me" – Heartburn (1989)
- "Walkin' Talkin'" – Gary Man & The Sunshine Band (1989)
- "Hello, Here I Am" – Geff Harrison (1992)
- "Soul Inspiration" – Soul Brothers (2003)
- "Brexit (Mind the Gap)" – Geff Harrison (2017)
