= Tritonus =

Tritonus may refer to:

- Tritone (music), or augmented fourth, a dissonant interval of two pitches
- Tritonus, a German progressive rock band
- Tritonus (beetle), a genus of insects in the tribe Laccobiini
