= The Voice Senior (German TV series) season 1 =

The Voice Senior
- Season 1
- Hosted by: Lena Gercke; Thore Schölermann
- Coaches: Mark Forster; Sasha Schmitz; The BossHoss; Yvonne Catterfeld
- Winner: Dan Lucas
- Winning coach: Sasha Schmitz
- Runner-up: Fritz Bliesener

Release
- Original network: Sat.1
- Original release: December 23, 2018 – January 4, 2019

Season chronology
- Next → Season 2

The first season of the German talent show The Voice Senior premiered on December 23, 2018 on Sat.1. The coaches were the duo Alec Völkel and Sascha Vollmer of the band The BossHoss, the singer and actress Yvonne Catterfeld, the singer and songwriter Mark Forster and the singer Sasha Schmitz. The hosts were Lena Gercke and Thore Schölermann.

Dan Lucas was named the winner of the season on January 4, 2019; making him the first contestant to win the show and Sasha Schmitz first win as a coach on The Voice Senior.

== Coaches and hosts ==
The Voice Senior season 1 coaches

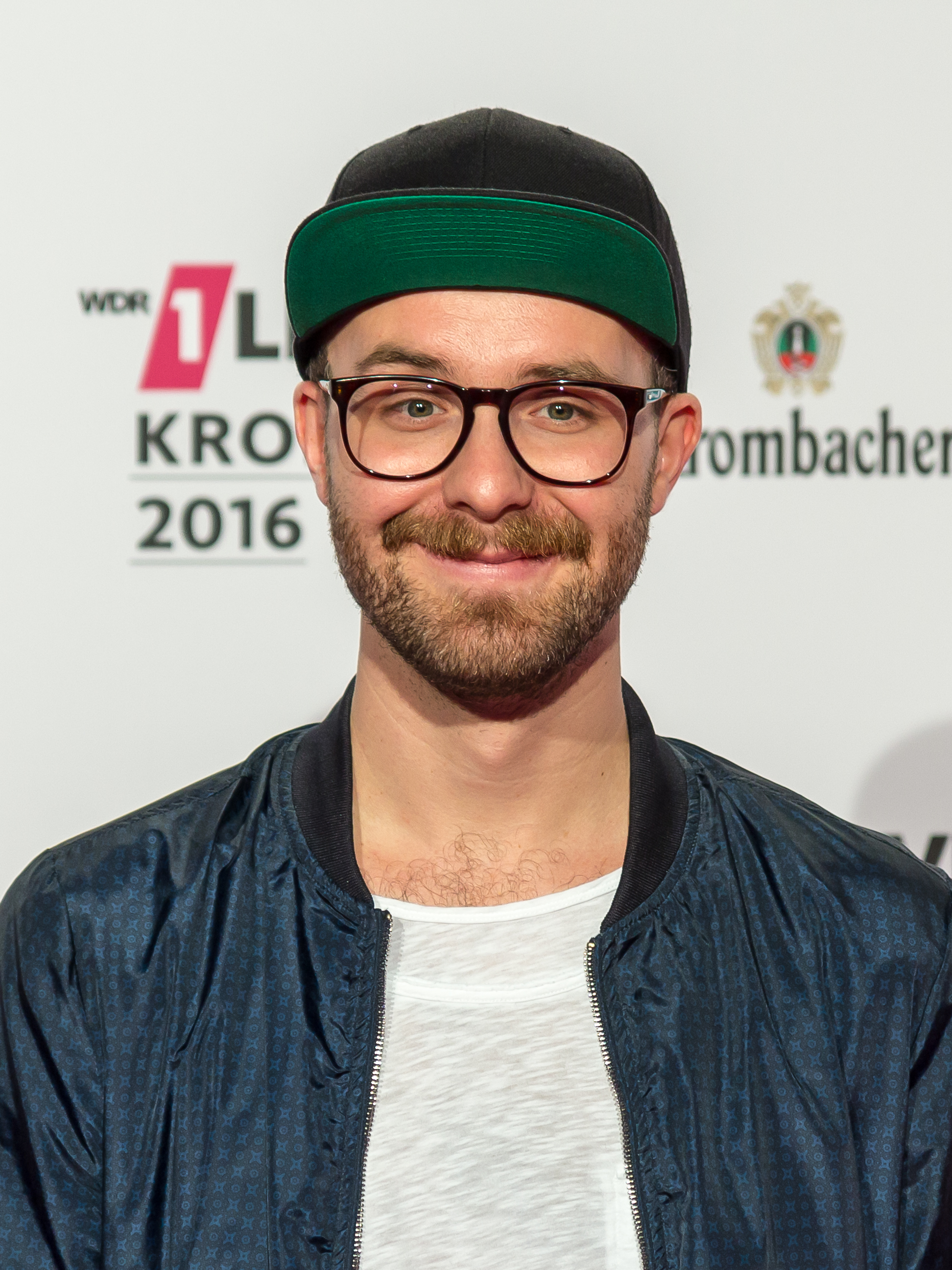
Mark Forster

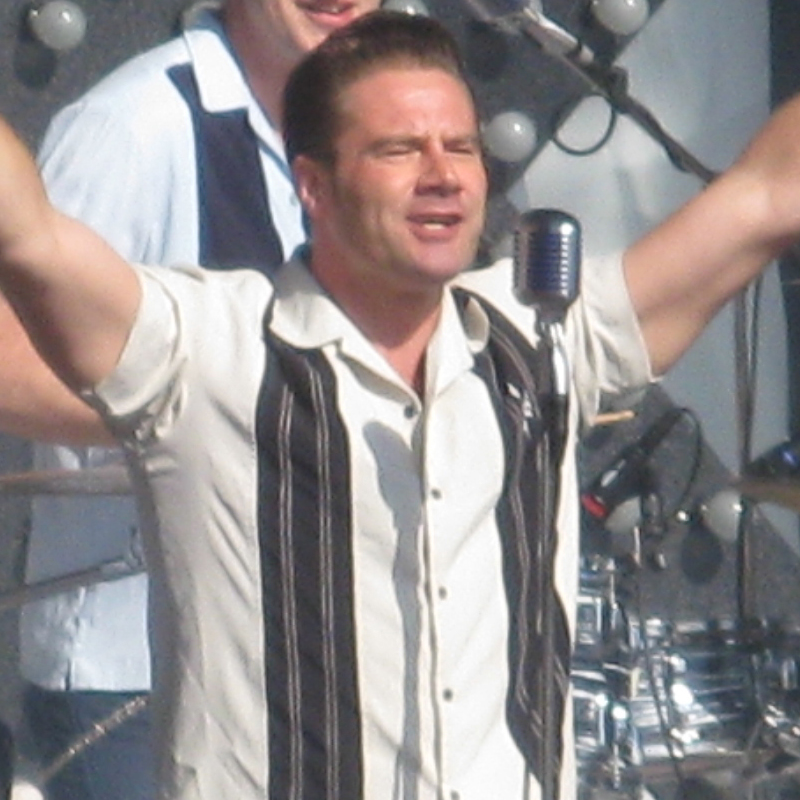
Sasha Schmitz

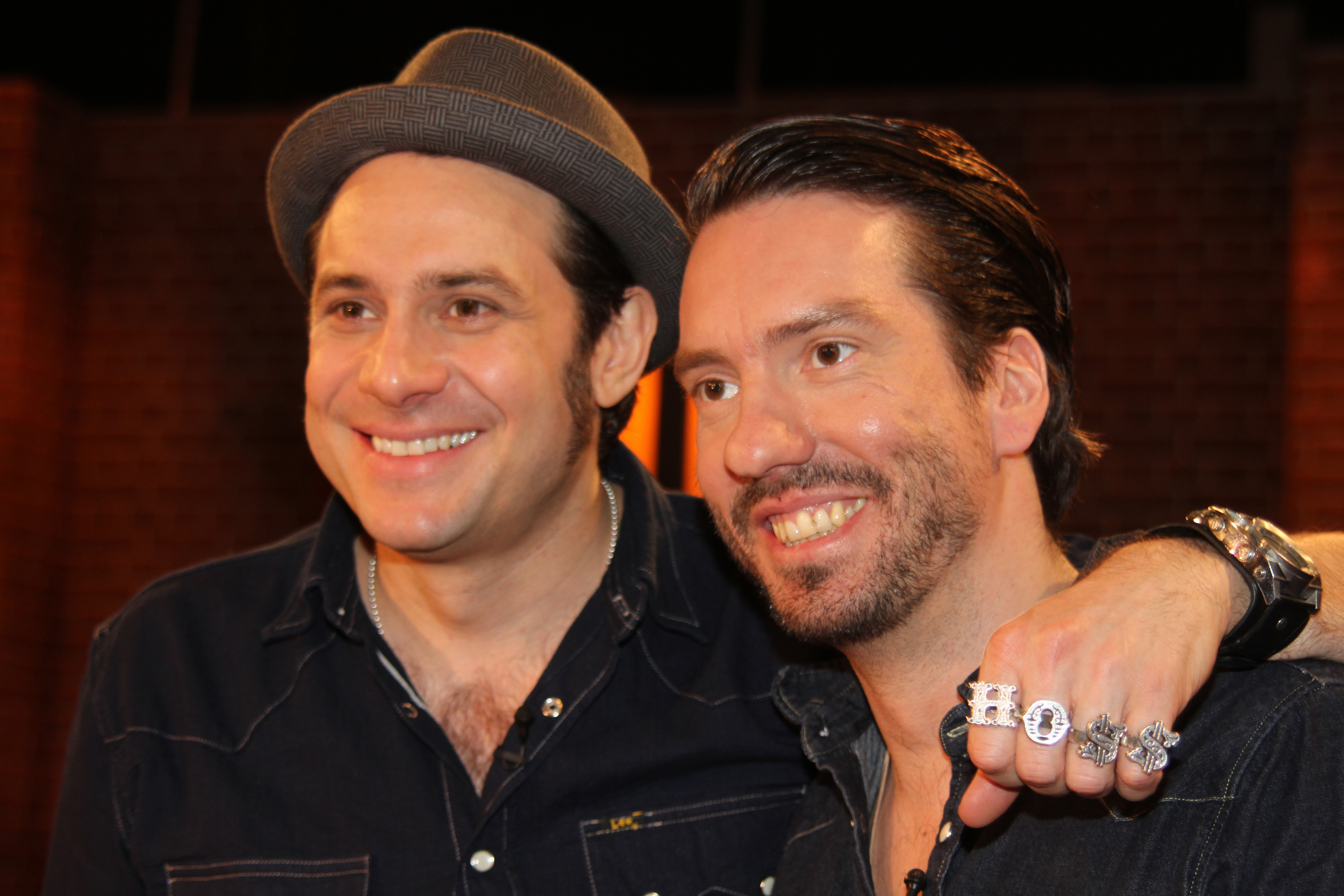
The BossHoss

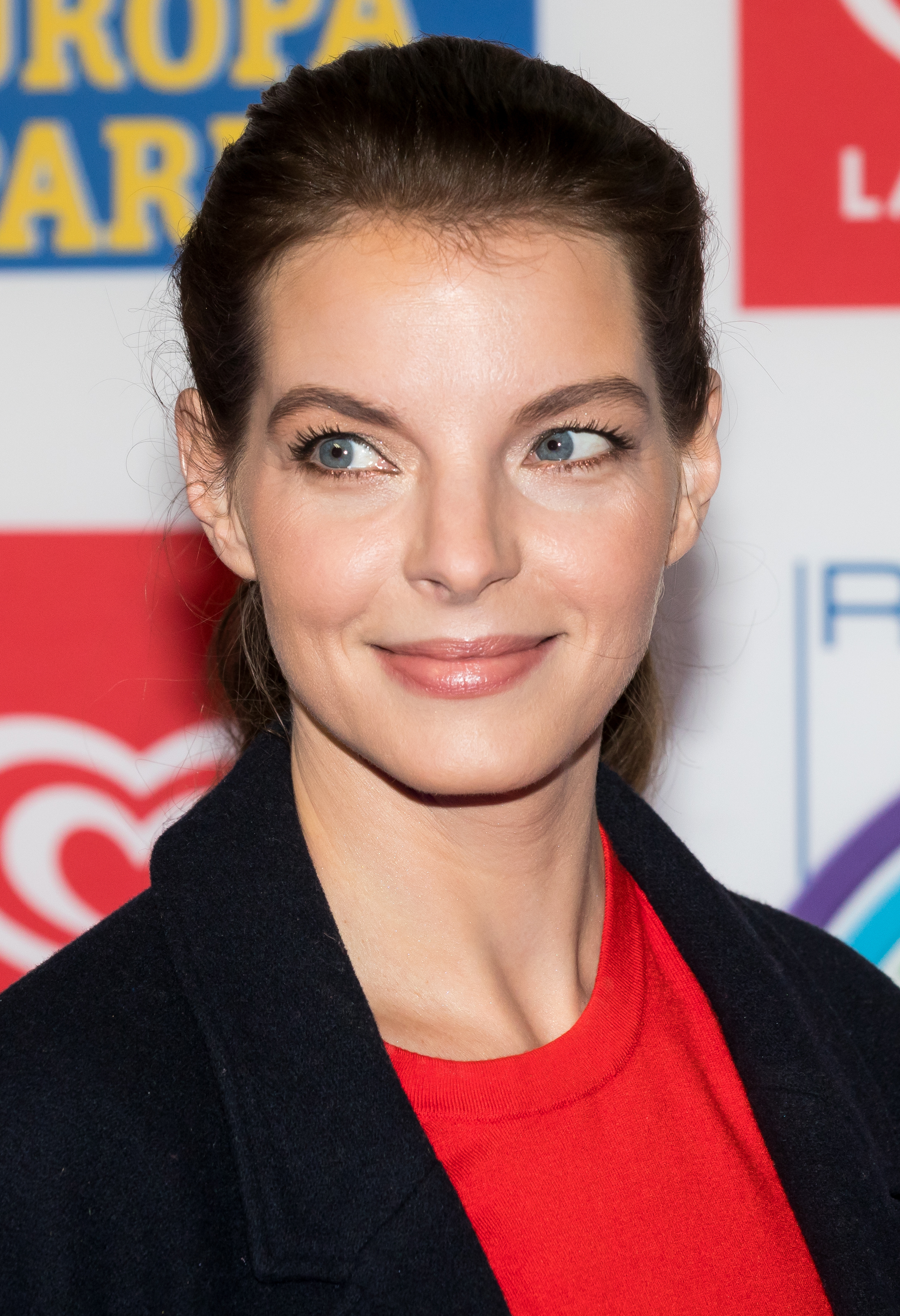
Yvonne Catterfeld

On June 29, 2018; the coaching panel for the first season was confirmed with Mark Forster, The BossHoss, Yvonne Catterfeld, all of whom have been coaches in the adult version; and Sasha Schmitz, who was previously a coach on The Voice Kids.

Current hosts of The Voice of Germany, Thore Schölermann and Lena Gercke, appointed as hosts for the first season.

== Teams ==
Colour key

- Winner
- Runner-up
- Third place
- Fourth place
- Eliminated in the Final
- Eliminated in the Sing Offs

Coach	Top 20 artists				
Mark Forster					
Mark Forster	Joerg Kemp	Giselle Rommel	Matteo Comis	Charles Duncan	Elvira Slawinski
The BossHoss					
The BossHoss	Willi Stein	Wolfgang Schorer	Steffen Martin	Heike Grammbitter	Hildegard Gutt
Yvonne Catterfeld					
Yvonne Catterfeld	Fritz Bliesener	Janice Harrington	Eduardo Villegas	Geff Harrison	Anna Greene Dell'Era
Sasha Schmitz					
Sasha Schmitz	Dan Lucas	Gabriele Treftz	Walter Golczyk	Barbara Parzeczewski	Michael Dixon

== Blind auditions ==
The two episodes of blind audition was broadcast on 23 and 28 December 2018 in Sat.1.

Color key

✔	Coach hit his/her "I WANT YOU" button
	Artist defaulted to this coach's team
	Artist elected to join this coach's team
	Artist eliminated with no coach pressing his or her "I WANT YOU" button
	Artist received a wildcard

=== Episode 1 (December 23) ===
The first blind audition episode was broadcast on December 23, 2018.

Order	Artist	Age	Song	Coach's and artist's choices			
Order	Artist	Age	Song	Mark	BossHoss	Yvonne	Sasha
1	Walter Golczyk	75	"Hard to Handle"	✔	✔	✔	✔
2	Gabriele Treftz	78	"Für Mich Soll's Rote Rosen Regnen"	✔	✔	✔	✔
3	Steffen Martin	64	"Junge"	✔	✔	—	✔
4	Nicolasa Antiquera-Mall	61	"One More Light"	—	—	—	—
5	Fritz Bliesener	80	"’O sole mio"	✔	✔	✔	✔
6	Janice Harrington	76	"Honky Tonk Women"	✔	✔	✔	—
7	Matteo Comis	62	"You to Me Are Everything"	✔	✔	—	—
8	Giselle Rommel	77	"Ich Liebe Das Leben"	✔	✔	—	—
9	Thomas 'Thommy' Klemt	74	"Blue Suede Shoes"	—	—	—	—
10	Heike Grammbitter	63	"Will You Still Love Me Tomorrow"	✔	✔	✔	—
11	Dan Lucas	64	"You're the Voice"	✔	✔	✔	✔

=== Episode 2 (December 28) ===
The second blind audition episode was broadcast on December 28, 2018.

Order	Artist	Age	Song	Coach's and artist's choices			
Order	Artist	Age	Song	Mark	BossHoss	Yvonne	Sasha
1	Wolfgang Schorer	61	"Born to Be Wild"	✔	✔	✔	✔
2	Eduardo Villegas	65	"Fragile"	✔	—	✔	—
3	Birgit Rüssmann	66	"No No Never"	—	—	—	—
4	Geff Harrison	71	"A Whiter Shade of Pale"	✔	✔	✔	✔
5	Joerg Kemp	64	"Still"	✔	✔	—	—
6	Willi Stein	68	"Maria"	✔	✔	—	—
7	Barbara Parzeczewski	65	"Walking By Myself"	—	✔	—	✔
8	Charles Duncan	78	"That's Life"	✔	—	—	—
9	Anna Greene Dell'Era	61	"Rise Up"	✔	✔	✔	—
10	Christian Herden	63	"Hier spricht dein Herz"	—	—	—	—
11	Elvira Slawinski	68	"Ich Will Keine Schokolade"	✔	—	—	—
12	Michael Dixon	68	"A House Is Not A Home"	✔	✔	✔	✔
13	Hildegard Gutt	80	"Adieu"	—	—	—	—

== Sing offs ==
The episode of sing offs was broadcast on 30 December 2018 in Sat.1. In this phase determines which two artists from each team will advance to the Final. When all artists have sung the coach decides who goes through.

Color key

Artist was saved by his/her coach and advanced to the Final
Artist was eliminated

Episode	Coach	Order	Artist	Song	Result
Episode 3 (December 30)	Sasha	1	Dan Lucas	"Don't Stop Believin'"	Advanced
Episode 3 (December 30)	Sasha	2	Barbara Parzeczewski	"Proud Mary"	Eliminated
Episode 3 (December 30)	Sasha	3	Michael Dixon	"What the World Needs Now Is Love"	Eliminated
Episode 3 (December 30)	Sasha	4	Walter Golczyk	"Roll Over Beethoven"	Eliminated
Episode 3 (December 30)	Sasha	5	Gabriele Treftz	"Für Immer"	Advanced
Episode 3 (December 30)	Yvonne	1	Eduardo Villegas	"Corazón Espinado"	Eliminated
Episode 3 (December 30)	Yvonne	2	Janice Harrington	"Hound Dog"	Advanced
Episode 3 (December 30)	Yvonne	3	Geff Harrison	"The First Cut Is the Deepest"	Eliminated
Episode 3 (December 30)	Yvonne	4	Anna Greene Dell'Era	"We Don't Have to Take Our Clothes Off"	Eliminated
Episode 3 (December 30)	Yvonne	5	Fritz Bliesener	"Il mare calmo della sera"	Advanced
Episode 3 (December 30)	Mark				
Episode 3 (December 30)	Mark	1	Elvira Slawinski	"Morgens Immer Müde"	Eliminated
Episode 3 (December 30)	Mark	2	Charles Duncan	"Make You Feel My Love"	Eliminated
Episode 3 (December 30)	Mark	3	Joerg Kemp	"Auf anderen Wegen"	Advanced
Episode 3 (December 30)	Mark	4	Giselle Rommel	"Musik liegt in der Luft"	Advanced
Episode 3 (December 30)	Mark	5	Matteo Comis	"It's Not Unusual"	Eliminated
Episode 3 (December 30)	BossHoss	1	Hildegard Gutt	"Eins und Eins, das macht Zwei"	Eliminated
Episode 3 (December 30)	BossHoss	2	Steffen Martin	"Du schreibst Geschichte"	Eliminated
Episode 3 (December 30)	BossHoss	3	Heike Grammbitter	"Oh! Darling"	Eliminated
Episode 3 (December 30)	BossHoss	4	Willi Stein	"Torna a Surriento"	Advanced
Episode 3 (December 30)	BossHoss	5	Wolfgang Schorer	"Smoke on the Water"	Advanced

== Final ==
The stage performances of the finale were recorded on December 1, 2018 in Berlin and on January 4, 2019 was broadcast. Only the announcement of the decision audience via televoting was broadcast live, but in a smaller studio with no presence of the coaches and the audience.

The contestants are mentored by their coach and choose a song that they want to sing in the final. In the first round the coach decides which one act remains and the other act will then be eliminated. The final round is chosen the winner by the public at home by televoting.

Coach	Artist	Round 1			Round 2			
Coach	Artist	Order	First Song	Coach decision	Order	Second Song	Viewers Voting	Result
Yvonne Catterfeld	Janice Harrington	1	"Put a Little Love in Your Heart"	Eliminated				
Yvonne Catterfeld	Fritz Bliesener	2	"The Prayer"	Advanced	12	"Caruso"	17.5%	Runner-up
Mark Forster	Giselle Rommel	3	"Ich glaub 'ne Dame Werd' ich Nie"	Eliminated				
Mark Forster	Joerg Kemp	4	"Eiserner Steg"	Advanced	9	"In Meinem Leben"	6.5%	Third Place
The Bosshoss	Wolfgang Schorer	5	"Highway to Hell"	Eliminated				
The Bosshoss	Willi Stein	6	"The Impossible Dream (The Quest)"	Advanced	10	"One Moment in Time"	6.0%	Fourth Place
Sasha Schmitz	Gabriele Treftz	7	"Lili Marleen"	Eliminated				
Sasha Schmitz	Dan Lucas	8	"Alone"	Advanced	11	"Help!"	70.0%	Winner

== Elimination chart ==
=== Overall ===
Color key
Artist's info

- Artist from Team Mark
- Artist from Team BossHoss
- Artist from Team Yvonne
- Artist from Team Sasha

Result details

- Winner
- Runner-up
- Third place
- Fourth place
- Artist was saved by their coach
- Artist was eliminated

sing offs and final results per week
Artist	Sing Offs	Final	
Artist	Sing Offs	Round 1	Round 2
Dan Lucas	Safe	Safe	Winner
Fritz Bliesener	Safe	Safe	Runner-up
Joerg Kemp	Safe	Safe	Third Place
Willi Stein	Safe	Safe	Fourth Place
Gabriele Treftz	Safe	Eliminated	Eliminated (Final)
Wolfgang Schorer	Safe	Eliminated	Eliminated (Final)
Giselle Rommel	Safe	Eliminated	Eliminated (Final)
Janice Harrington	Safe	Eliminated	Eliminated (Final)
Steffen Martin	Eliminated	Eliminated (Sing Offs)	
Heike Grammbitter	Eliminated	Eliminated (Sing Offs)	
Hildegard Gutt	Eliminated	Eliminated (Sing Offs)	
Matteo Comis	Eliminated	Eliminated (Sing Offs)	
Charles Duncan	Eliminated	Eliminated (Sing Offs)	
Elvira Slawinski	Eliminated	Eliminated (Sing Offs)	
Eduardo Villegas	Eliminated	Eliminated (Sing Offs)	
Geff Harrison	Eliminated	Eliminated (Sing Offs)	
Anna Greene Dell'Era	Eliminated	Eliminated (Sing Offs)	
Walter Golczyk	Eliminated	Eliminated (Sing Offs)	
Barbara Parzeczewski	Eliminated	Eliminated (Sing Offs)	
Michael Dixon	Eliminated	Eliminated (Sing Offs)	

=== Team ===
Color key
Artist's info

- Artist from Team Mark
- Artist from Team BossHoss
- Artist from Team Yvonne
- Artist from Team Sasha

Result details

- Winner
- Runner-up
- Third place
- Fourth place
- Artist was eliminated

Artist	Sing Offs	Final	
Artist	Sing Offs	Round 1	Round 2
Joerg Kemp	Advanced	Advanced	Third Place
Giselle Rommel	Advanced	Eliminated	
Matteo Comis	Eliminated		
Charles Duncan	Eliminated		
Elvira Slawinski	Eliminated		
Willi Stein	Advanced	Advanced	Fourth Place
Wolfgang Schorer	Advanced	Eliminated	
Steffen Martin	Eliminated		
Heike Grammbitter	Eliminated		
Hildegard Gutt	Eliminated		
Fritz Bliesener	Advanced	Advanced	Runner-up
Janice Harrington	Advanced	Eliminated	
Eduardo Villegas	Eliminated		
Geff Harrison	Eliminated		
Anna Greene Dell'Era	Eliminated		
Dan Lucas	Advanced	Advanced	Winner
Gabriele Treftz	Advanced	Eliminated	
Walter Golczyk	Eliminated		
Barbara Parzeczewski	Eliminated		
Michael Dixon	Eliminated		

== Ratings ==
Episode		Date	Timeslot	Viewers (in millions)		Share (in %)		Source
Episode		Date	Timeslot	Total	14 - 49 Years	Total	14 - 49 Years	Source
1	"Blind Auditions"	December 23, 2018	Sunday 20:15pm	3.13	1.42	9.9	13.1	
2	"Blind Auditions"	December 28, 2018	Friday 20:15pm	2.16	0.90	7.6	10.6	
3	"Sing Offs"	December 30, 2018	Sunday 20:15pm	2.30	0.92	7.5	9.2	
4	"Final"	January 4, 2019	Friday 20:15pm	2.20	0.81	7.8	9.7	
