= The Voice Senior (German TV series) season 2 =

The Voice Senior
- Season 2
- Hosted by: Lena Gercke; Thore Schölermann
- Coaches: Sasha Schmitz; The BossHoss; Yvonne Catterfeld; Michael Patrick Kelly
- Winner: Monika Smets
- Winning coach: Sasha Schmitz

Release
- Original network: Sat.1
- Original release: November 24 – December 15, 2019

Season chronology
- ← Previous; Season 1

The second and final season of the German talent show The Voice Senior premiered on November 24, 2019 on Sat.1. The coaches were the duo Alec Völkel and Sascha Vollmer of the band The BossHoss, the singer and actress Yvonne Catterfeld, the singer Sasha Schmitz all returning for their second season and with the new coach singer Michael Patrick Kelly, replacing Mark Forster. Lena Gercke and Thore Schölermann returned for their second season as hosts.

Monika Smets was named the winner of the season on December 15, 2019; making her the first female winner, marking Sasha Schmitz's second win as a coach on The Voice Senior.

== Coaches and hosts ==
The Voice Senior season 2 coaches

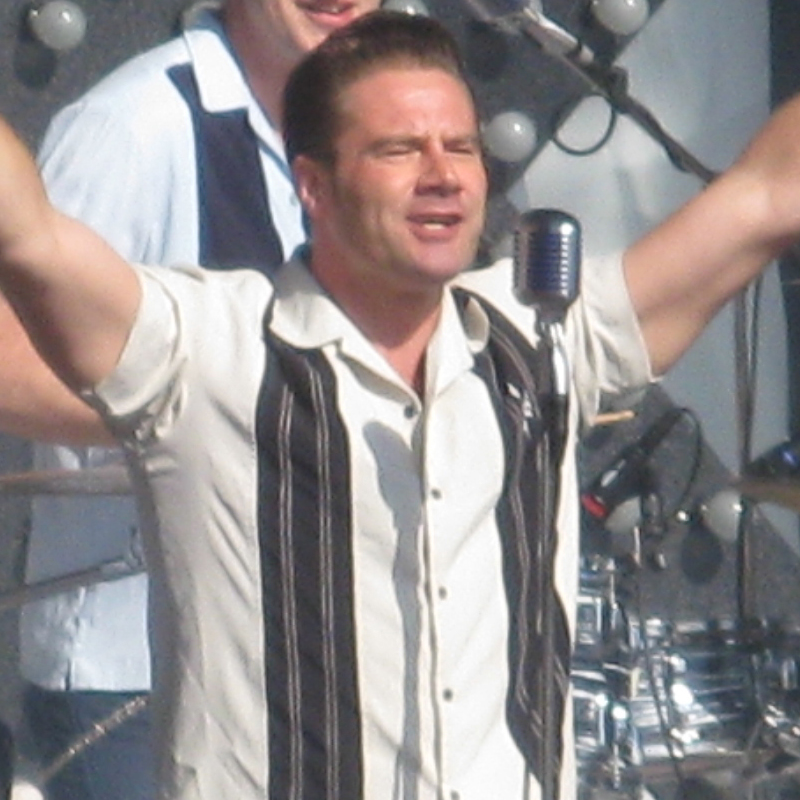
Sasha Schmitz

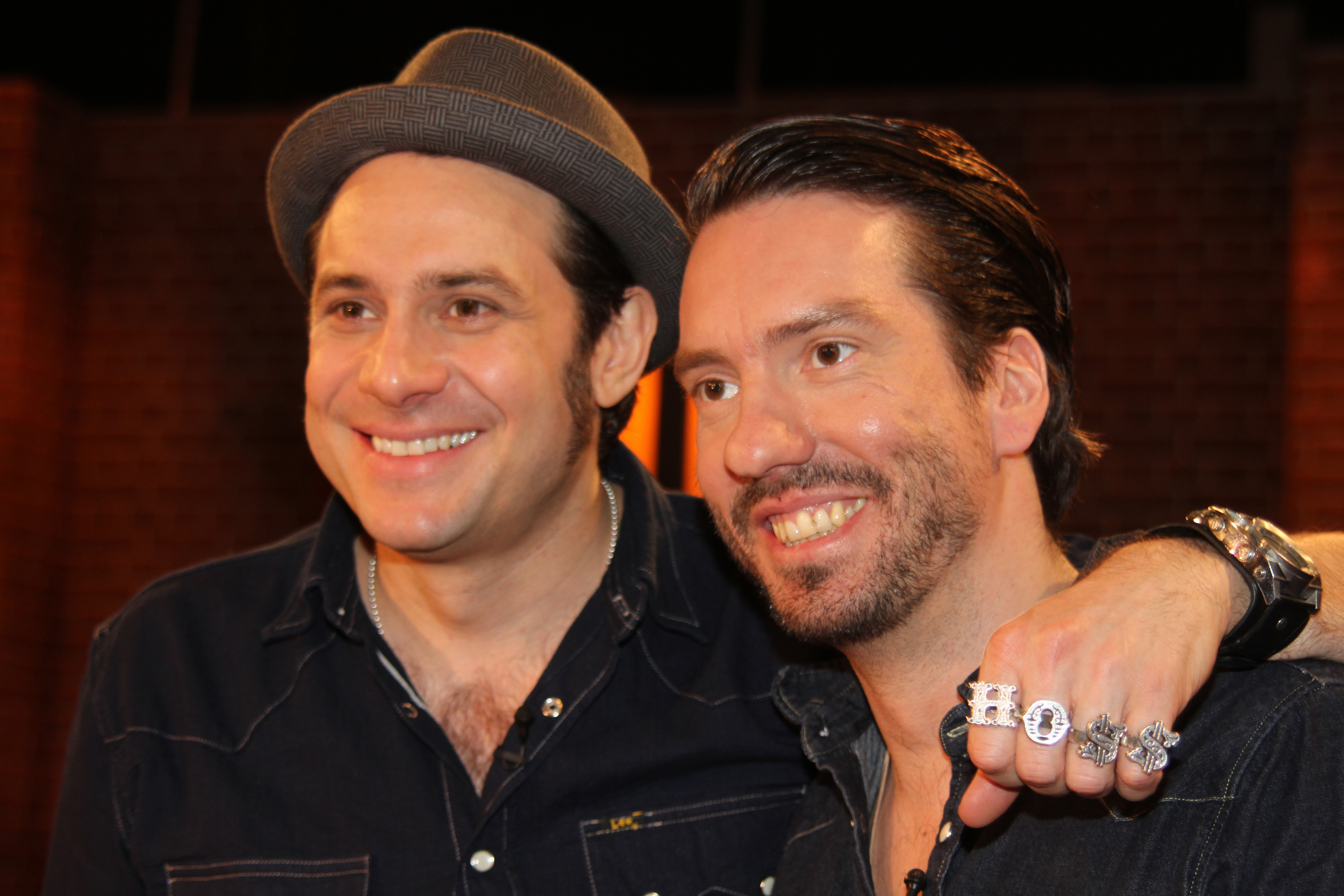
The BossHoss

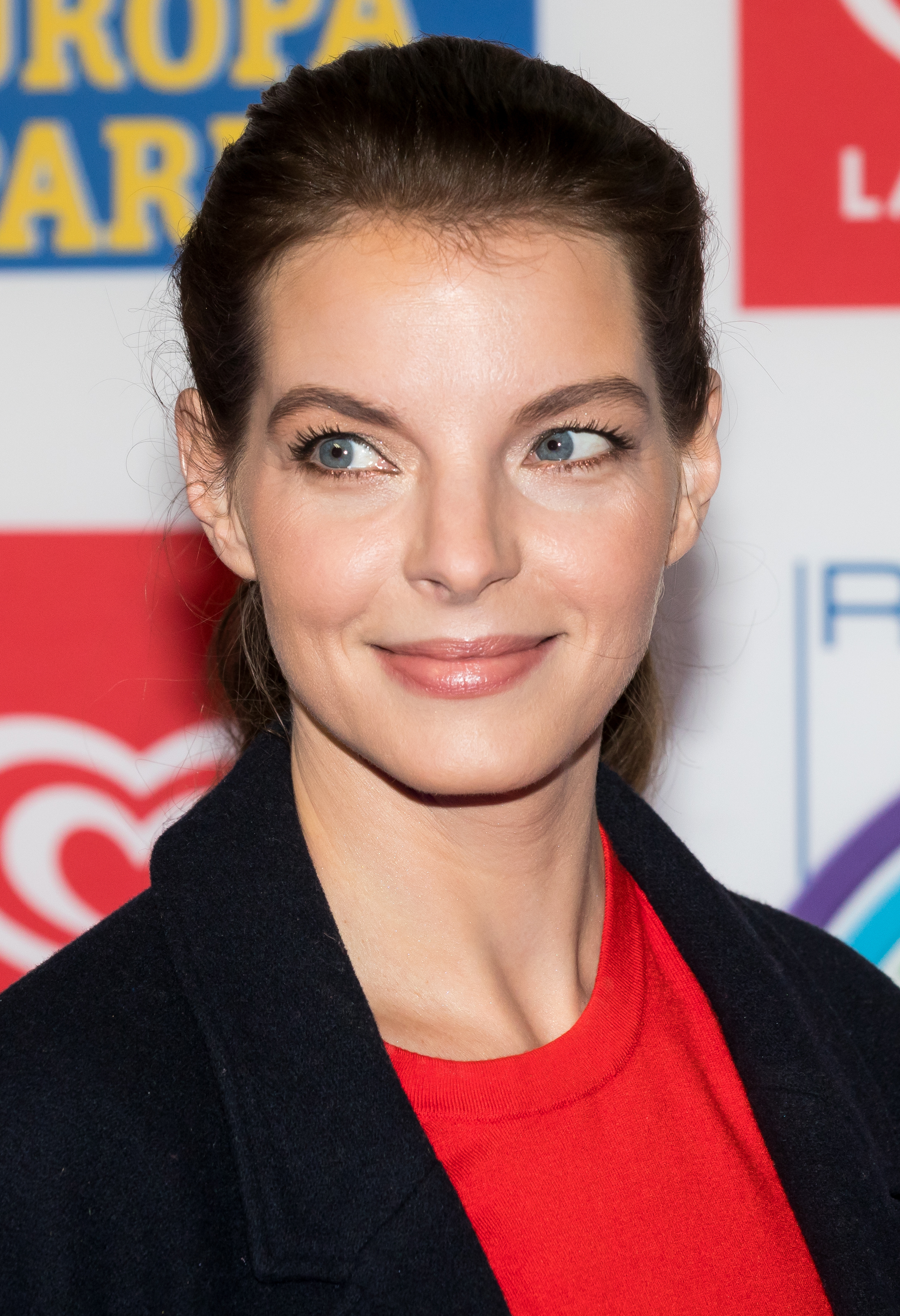
Yvonne Catterfeld

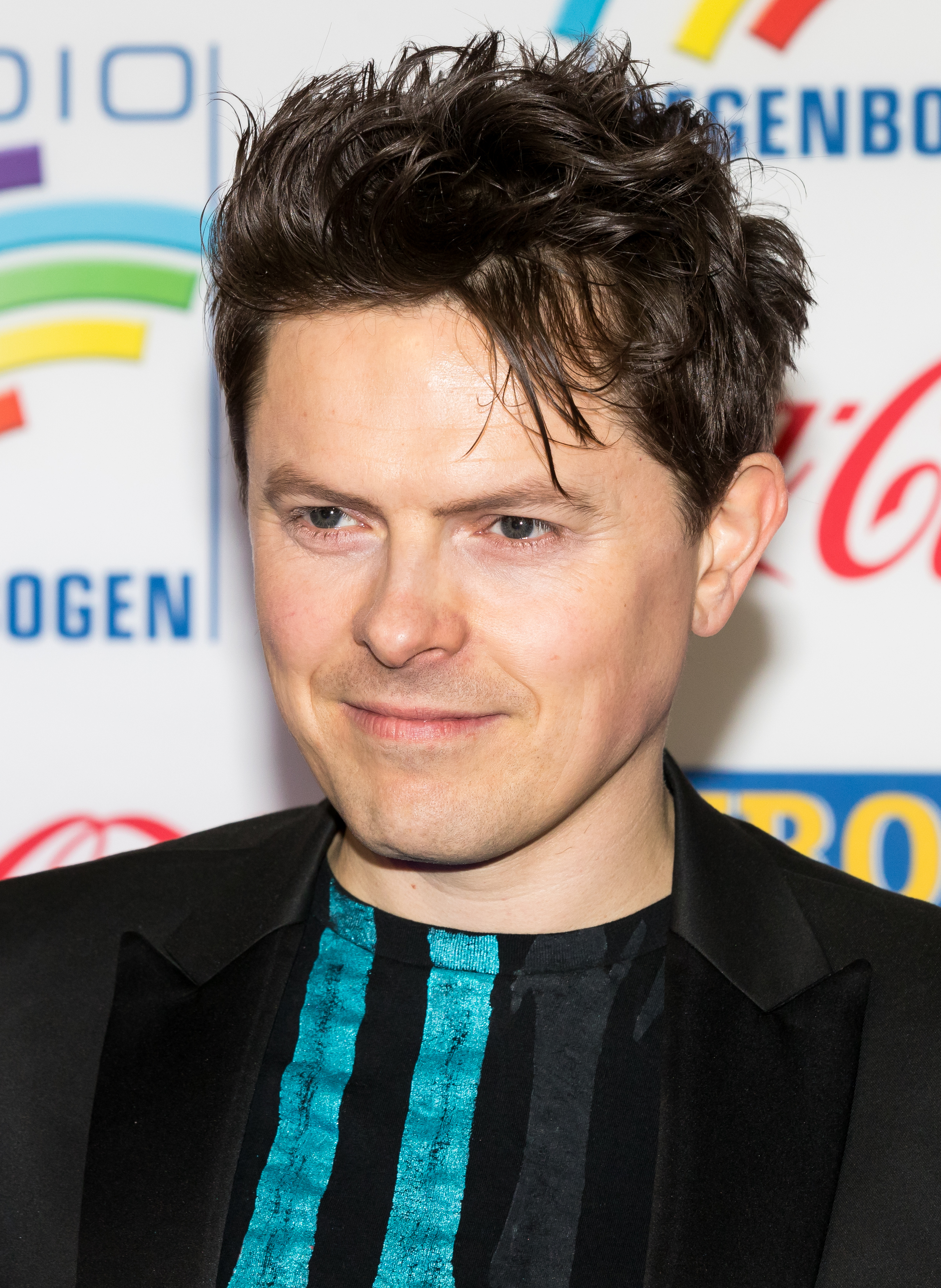
Michael Patrick Kelly

On May 22, 2019, it was announced that Michael Patrick Kelly would not be returning as a coach on the ninth season of The Voice of Germany but instead will switch to coach on The Voice Senior, replacing Mark Forster. Sasha Schmitz, The BossHoss and Yvonne Catterfeld all returned for their second season as coaches.

Lena Gercke and Thore Schölermann also returned as hosts.

== Teams ==
Colour key

- Winner
- Finalist
- Eliminated in the Final
- Eliminated in the Sing Offs
- Withdrew

Coach	Top 19 artists				
Michael Patrick Kelly					
Michael Patrick Kelly	Silvia Christoph	Eva Norel	Dieter Waldhelm	Dr. Rainer Bach	Lutz Adam
The BossHoss					
The BossHoss	Dieter Bürkle	Renate Akkermann	Jörg Ahlich	David Warwick	Agata Mongiovi Bonafe
Yvonne Catterfeld					
Yvonne Catterfeld	Dennis Legree	Michael Poteat	John Wiseman	Thomas Nestler	
Sasha Schmitz					
Sasha Schmitz	Monika Smets	Claus Diercks	Twinset	Jenny Evans	Lutz Hiller

== Blind auditions ==
The auditions for the second season took place from February 2019 to March 2019 but not shown on television. The blind auditions was recorded from June 20 to June 21 2019 at Studio Adlershof in Berlin and was broadcast on Sundays from November 24 until December 1, 2019.

Color key

✔	Coach hit his/her "I WANT YOU" button
	Artist defaulted to this coach's team
	Artist elected to join this coach's team
	Artist eliminated with no coach pressing his or her "I WANT YOU" button

=== Episode 1 (November 24) ===
The first blind audition episode was broadcast on November 24, 2019.

Order	Artist	Age	Song	Coach's and artist's choices			
Order	Artist	Age	Song	Michael Patrick	BossHoss	Yvonne	Sasha
1	Renate Akkermann	80	"Schau mich bitte nicht so an"	–	✔	✔	–
2	Dieter Bürkle	75	"Delilah"	–	✔	✔	✔
3	Eva Norel	67	"All by Myself"	✔	✔	✔	✔
4	Cilli Hagedorn-Benzler	94	"Der erste Lack ist ab"	–	–	–	–
5	Twinset (Ernst Turba & Rüdiger Zaczyk)	66/61	"She Loves You"	✔	–	✔	✔
6	Dennis Legree	65	"Unchained Melody"	✔	✔	✔	✔
7	Lutz Adam	66	"Amarillo by Morning"	✔	–	✔	✔
8	Silvia Christoph	68	"Piece of My Heart"	✔	✔	✔	–
9	Juandalynn R. Abernathy	64	"Almost There"	–	–	–	–
10	Lutz Hiller	62	"St. Pauli"	–	–	–	✔
11	John Wiseman	81	"My Way"	✔	✔	✔	✔

=== Episode 2 (December 1) ===
The second and final blind audition episode was broadcast on December 1, 2019.

Order	Artist	Age	Song	Coach's and artist's choices			
Order	Artist	Age	Song	Michael Patrick	BossHoss	Yvonne	Sasha
1	Jörg Ahlich	60	"I'd Do Anything for Love (But I Won't Do That)"	–	✔	–	✔
2	Michael Poteat	60	"Just Once"	✔	✔	✔	✔
3	Jenny Evans	65	"Alone Again (Naturally)"	–	✔	–	✔
4	Dieter Waldhelm	80	"Granada"	✔	–	–	–
5	David Warwick	65	"She"	✔	✔	–	–
6	Renate Remmelt	69	"Siebentausend Rinder"	–	–	–	–
7	Agata Mongiovi Bonafe	60	"Chain of Fools"	✔	✔	✔	✔
8	Monika Smets	68	"Lascia ch'io pianga"	–	✔	–	✔
9	Dr. Rainer Bach	71	"Ich Möcht So Gern Dave Dudley Hörn"	✔	–	–	–
10	Lore Duwe	84	"Über Sieben Brücken Musst Du Gehen"	–	–	–	–
11	Thomas Nestler	63	"White Christmas"	–	–	✔	–
12	Claus Diercks	66	"Hoochie Coochie Man"	✔	✔	✔	✔

== Sing offs ==
The sing offs was recorded on August 16, 2019 in Berlin and was broadcast on December 8, 2019.

Color key

Artist was saved by his/her coach and advanced to the Final
Artist was eliminated

Episode	Coach	Order	Artist	Song	Result
Episode 3 (December 8)	Michael Patrick	1	Lutz Adam	"Blowin' in the Wind"	Eliminated
Episode 3 (December 8)	Michael Patrick	2	Dr. Rainer Bach	"Shotgun"	Eliminated
Episode 3 (December 8)	Michael Patrick	3	Silvia Christoph	"Nutbush City Limits"	Advanced
Episode 3 (December 8)	Michael Patrick	4	Dieter Waldhelm	"Wenn ich einmal Reich wär"	Eliminated
Episode 3 (December 8)	Michael Patrick	5	Eva Norel	"Hero"	Advanced
Episode 3 (December 8)	BossHoss	1	Agata Mongiovi Bonafe	"Ain't Nobody"	Eliminated
Episode 3 (December 8)	BossHoss	2	Dieter Bürkle	"Bridge over Troubled Water"	Advanced
Episode 3 (December 8)	BossHoss	3	David Warwick	"Piano Man"	Eliminated
Episode 3 (December 8)	BossHoss	4	Renate Akkermann	"Die Liebe Bleibt"	Advanced
Episode 3 (December 8)	BossHoss	5	Jörg Ahlich	"The Final Countdown"	Eliminated
Episode 3 (December 8)	Yvonne	1	John Wiseman	"The Impossible Dream"	Eliminated
Episode 3 (December 8)	Yvonne	2	Michael Poteat	"There's Nothing Holdin' Me Back"	Advanced
Episode 3 (December 8)	Yvonne	3	Thomas Nestler	"Junge komm bald wieder"	Eliminated
Episode 3 (December 8)	Yvonne	4	Dennis Legree	"Circle of Life"	Advanced
Episode 3 (December 8)	Sasha	1	Claus Diercks	"Trouble"	Advanced
Episode 3 (December 8)	Sasha	2	Jenny Evans	"Close to You"	Eliminated
Episode 3 (December 8)	Sasha	3	Twinset	"Bye Bye Love"	Eliminated
Episode 3 (December 8)	Sasha	4	Monika Smets	"Ave Maria"	Advanced

== Final ==
The Final was broadcast on December 15, 2019 and unlike the first season, will be broadcast entirely as a live show. Each coach has in his/her team 2 artists.

In the first round the coach decides which one act remains and the other act will then be eliminated. The final round is chosen the winner by the public at home by televoting.

Coach	Artist	Round 1			Round 2		
Coach	Artist	Order	First Song	Coach decision	Order	Second Song	Result
The BossHoss	Dieter Bürkle	1	"Sex Bomb"	Advanced	9	"I'll Never Fall in Love Again"	Runner-up
The BossHoss	Renate Akkermann	2	"Liebe mich"	Eliminated			
Michael Patrick Kelly	Silvia Christoph	3	"It's a Man's Man's Man's World"	Advanced	10	"Somebody to Love"	Runner-up
Michael Patrick Kelly	Eva Norel	4	"Greatest Love of All"	Eliminated			
Yvonne Catterfeld	Michael Poteat	5	"September"	Eliminated			
Yvonne Catterfeld	Dennis Legree	6	"Georgia on My Mind"	Advanced	11	"A Change Is Gonna Come"	Runner-up
Sasha Schmitz	Monika Smets	7	"Exsultate, jubilate: Alleluja (KV165)"	Advanced	12	"Adeste Fidelis"	Winner
Sasha Schmitz	Claus Diercks	8	"Do I Ever Cross Your Mind"	Eliminated			

Non-competition performances
Order	Performer	Song
1	Anisa Celik & Davit Nikalayan from The Voice Kids; Niklas Schregel & Oxa from The Voice of Germany; Dan Lucas from The Voice Senior	"Don’t Stop Believin’"
2	Max Giesinger & Lotte	"Auf das, was da noch kommt"

== Elimination chart ==
=== Overall ===
Color key
Artist's info

- Artist from Team Michael Patrick
- Artist from Team BossHoss
- Artist from Team Yvonne
- Artist from Team Sasha

Result details

- Winner
- Finalist
- Artist was saved by their coach
- Artist was eliminated
- Artist was withdrew

sing offs and final results per week
Artist	Sing Offs	Final	
Artist	Sing Offs	Round 1	Round 2
Monika Smets	Safe	Safe	Winner
Silvia Christoph	Safe	Safe	Finalist
Dieter Bürkle	Safe	Safe	Finalist
Dennis Legree	Safe	Safe	Finalist
Claus Diercks	Safe	Eliminated	Eliminated (Final)
Michael Poteat	Safe	Eliminated	Eliminated (Final)
Eva Norel	Safe	Eliminated	Eliminated (Final)
Renate Akkermann	Safe	Eliminated	Eliminated (Final)
Twinset	Eliminated	Eliminated (Sing Offs)	
Jenny Evans	Eliminated	Eliminated (Sing Offs)	
John Wiseman	Eliminated	Eliminated (Sing Offs)	
Thomas Nestler	Eliminated	Eliminated (Sing Offs)	
Jörg Ahlich	Eliminated	Eliminated (Sing Offs)	
David Warwick	Eliminated	Eliminated (Sing Offs)	
Agata Mongiovi Bonafe	Eliminated	Eliminated (Sing Offs)	
Dieter Waldhelm	Eliminated	Eliminated (Sing Offs)	
Dr. Rainer Bach	Eliminated	Eliminated (Sing Offs)	
Lutz Adam	Eliminated	Eliminated (Sing Offs)	
Lutz Hiller	Withdrew (Sing Offs)		

=== Team ===
Color key
Artist's info

- Artist from Team Michael Patrick
- Artist from Team BossHoss
- Artist from Team Yvonne
- Artist from Team Sasha

Result details

- Winner
- Finalist
- Artist was eliminated
- Artist was withdrew

Artist	Sing Offs	Final	
Artist	Sing Offs	Round 1	Round 2
Silvia Christoph	Advanced	Advanced	Finalist
Eva Norel	Advanced	Eliminated	
Dieter Waldhelm	Eliminated		
Dr. Rainer Bach	Eliminated		
Lutz Adam	Eliminated		
Dieter Bürkle	Advanced	Advanced	Finalist
Renate Akkermann	Advanced	Eliminated	
Jörg Ahlich	Eliminated		
David Warwick	Eliminated		
Agata Mongiovi Bonafe	Eliminated		
Dennis Legree	Advanced	Advanced	Finalist
Michael Poteat	Advanced	Eliminated	
John Wiseman	Eliminated		
Thomas Nestler	Eliminated		
Monika Smets	Advanced	Advanced	Winner
Claus Diercks	Advanced	Eliminated	
Twinset	Eliminated		
Jenny Evans	Eliminated		
Lutz Hiller	Withdrew (Sing Offs)		

== Ratings ==
Episode		Date	Timeslot	Viewers (in millions)		Share (in %)		Source
Episode		Date	Timeslot	Total	14 - 49 Years	Total	14 - 49 Years	Source
1	"Blind Auditions"	November 24, 2019	Sunday 20:15pm	2.48	1.07	8.1	9.6	
2	"Blind Auditions"	December 1, 2019	Sunday 20:15pm	1.93	0.73	6.3	7.3	
3	"Sing Offs"	December 8, 2019	Sunday 20:15pm	1.57	0.49	5.6	5.5	
4	"Final"	December 15, 2019	Sunday 20:15pm	1.62	0.50	5.7	5.4	
