= In Exile (Michael Patrick Kelly album) =

Studio album by Paddy Kelly
- Released: 17 March 2003
- Recorded: 2002–2003
- Studio: Principal Studios (Germany); Studio Miraval (France); Galaxy Studios (Belgium)
- Genre: Pop; pop rock
- Length: 50:30
- Label: Polydor
- Producer: Fabio Trentini; Marco Minnemann; Michael Patrick Kelly

Michael Patrick Kelly chronology
In Exile (2003)	Human (2015)

Singles from In Exile
- 1. "Pray, Pray, Pray" Released: 2003; 2. "When You Sleep" Released: 2003

Professional ratings
Review scores
Source	Rating
laut.de	3/5 stars

In Exile is the debut solo studio album by Irish-American singer-songwriter Michael Patrick Kelly and his only album issued under his popular band name, Paddy Kelly. It was released on 27 March 2003 through Polydor Records. Recording sessions took place at Principal Studios in Germany, Studio Miraval in France and Galaxy Studios in Belgium between the production of The Kelly Family albums La Patata (2002) and Homerun (2004). Production was handled by Kelly himself together with Marco Minnemann and Fabio Trentini.

The album peaked at number 13 in Germany and number 49 in Austria. It was supported with singles "Pray, Pray, Pray" and "When You Sleep". Its lead single "Pray Pray Pray" reached number 13 in Germany, number 43 in Austria and number 74 in the Netherlands. The second single off of the album, "When You Sleep", made it to number 45 in Germany and number 70 in Austria.

== Track listing ==
All lyrics are written by Michael Patrick Kelly.

No.	Title	Length
1.	"Living in the Line of Fire"	4:59
2.	"Money Making Machine"	5:02
3.	"Pray Pray Pray"	4:28
4.	"Rain of Roses"	5:24
5.	"No Fuzz, No Buzz, Back to Rock'n Roll"	4:42
6.	"When You Sleep"	4:39
7.	"Thanking Blessed Mary"	4:54
8.	"Knick-Knack-Paddy-Wack"	3:46
9.	"Search for Truth"	4:42
10.	"Movie"	3:16
11.	"Hope"	4:38
Total length:		50:30

== Personnel ==
- Michael Patrick "Paddy" Kelly – lyrics, composer (tracks: 1–7, 9–11), vocals, producer, arranger, drawings
- Angelo Kelly – backing vocals (track 8)
- Marco Minnemann – producer, arranger
- Fabio Trentini – producer, arranger
- Britta Kühlmann – recording
- Ronald Prent – mixing
- Myriam Corrège – engineering assistant
- Bob Ludwig – mastering
- Heidi Mösl – artwork
- Thomas Stachelhaus – photography

== Charts ==
Chart (2003)	Peak position
Austrian Albums (Ö3 Austria)	49
German Albums (Offizielle Top 100)	13
