= ID (Michael Patrick Kelly album) =

iD

Studio album by Michael Patrick Kelly
- Released: 16 June 2017
- Genre: Pop; pop rock
- Length: 54:36
- Label: Columbia
- Producer: Alex Beitzke; Bradley Spence; Clayton Morrison; Grayson Finley; Jimmy Hogarth; Michael Patrick Kelly; Petter Ericson Stakee; Robin Tadic

Michael Patrick Kelly chronology
Ruah (2016)	iD (2017)	B.O.A.T.S (2021)

Professional ratings
Review scores
Source	Rating
laut.de	3/5 stars

iD is the fourth solo studio album by Irish-American singer-songwriter Michael Patrick Kelly. It was released on 16 June 2017 through Columbia/Sony Music. Production was handled by Kelly himself together with Jimmy Hogarth, Bradley Spence, Alex Beitzke, Clayton Morrison, Grayson Finley, Petter Ericson Stakee and Robin Tadic. It features guest appearances from Gentleman and Wildwood Kin.

The album reached number 2 in Germany, number 5 in Switzerland, number 7 in Austria, number 174 in Wallonia and number 200 in the Netherlands. It was certified Platinum by the Bundesverband Musikindustrie in 2019 and its title track, "iD", also achieved BVMI's Platinum status in 2023.

== Track listing ==
No.	Title	Writer(s)	Producer(s)	Length
1.	"Golden Age"	Michael Patrick Kelly; David Rhodes; Jack Gourlay	Paddy Kelly; Jimmy Hogarth	3:56
2.	"iD" (featuring Gentleman)	Kelly; Clayton Morrison	Paddy Kelly; Clayton Morrison	3:19
3.	"Higher Love"	Kelly; James Dearness Hogarth	Paddy Kelly; Jimmy Hogarth	4:09
4.	"Friends R Family"	Kelly; Charlie Grant	Paddy Kelly; Jimmy Hogarth	4:17
5.	"New Spirit" (featuring Wildwood Kin)	Kelly	Paddy Kelly; Bradley Spence; Alex Beitzke	3:59
6.	"Requiem"	Kelly; Hogarth	Paddy Kelly; Jimmy Hogarth	3:49
7.	"Run Jump Fly"	Kelly; Martin Sutton	Paddy Kelly; Bradley Spence	3:20
8.	"A Little Faith"	Kelly; Petter Ericson Stakee	Paddy Kelly; Petter Ericson Stakee	3:05
9.	"Land of Bliss"	Kelly; Hogarth	Paddy Kelly; Jimmy Hogarth	4:14
10.	"So Beautiful"	Kelly	Paddy Kelly; Bradley Spence; Alex Beitzke	3:52
11.	"So Beautiful" (Reprise)	Kelly	Paddy Kelly; Bradley Spence; Alex Beitzke	0:44
12.	"Free"	Kelly; Paul Steel; Jake Isaac	Paddy Kelly; Jimmy Hogarth	3:33
13.	"Lazarus"	Kelly; Jimmy Harry	Paddy Kelly; Jimmy Hogarth	4:11
14.	"How Do You Love"	Kelly; Grayson Finley; Robin Tadic	Paddy Kelly; Grayson Finley; Robin Tadic	3:27
15.	"Last Words"		Paddy Kelly; Bradley Spence; Alex Beitzke	4:41
Total length:				54:36

Extended Version
No.	Title	Length
16.	"Bigger Life"
17.	"Et Voilá"
18.	"Roundabouts"
19.	"Talk to Me"
20.	"Awake"
21.	"Closer"
22.	"Shake Away" (Acoustic)

== Charts ==
=== Weekly charts ===
Chart (2017–18)	Peak position
Austrian Albums (Ö3 Austria)	7
Belgian Albums (Ultratop Wallonia)	174
Dutch Albums (Album Top 100)	200
German Albums (Offizielle Top 100)	2
Swiss Albums (Schweizer Hitparade)	5

=== Year-end charts ===
Chart (2017)	Position
German Albums (Offizielle Top 100)	25
Swiss Albums (Schweizer Hitparade)	66
Chart (2018)	Position
German Albums (Offizielle Top 100)	21

== Certifications ==
Region	Certification	Certified units/sales
Germany (BVMI)	Platinum	200,000^{‡}
^{‡} Sales+streaming figures based on certification alone.
