= Michael Patrick Kelly =

Irish singer (born 1977)

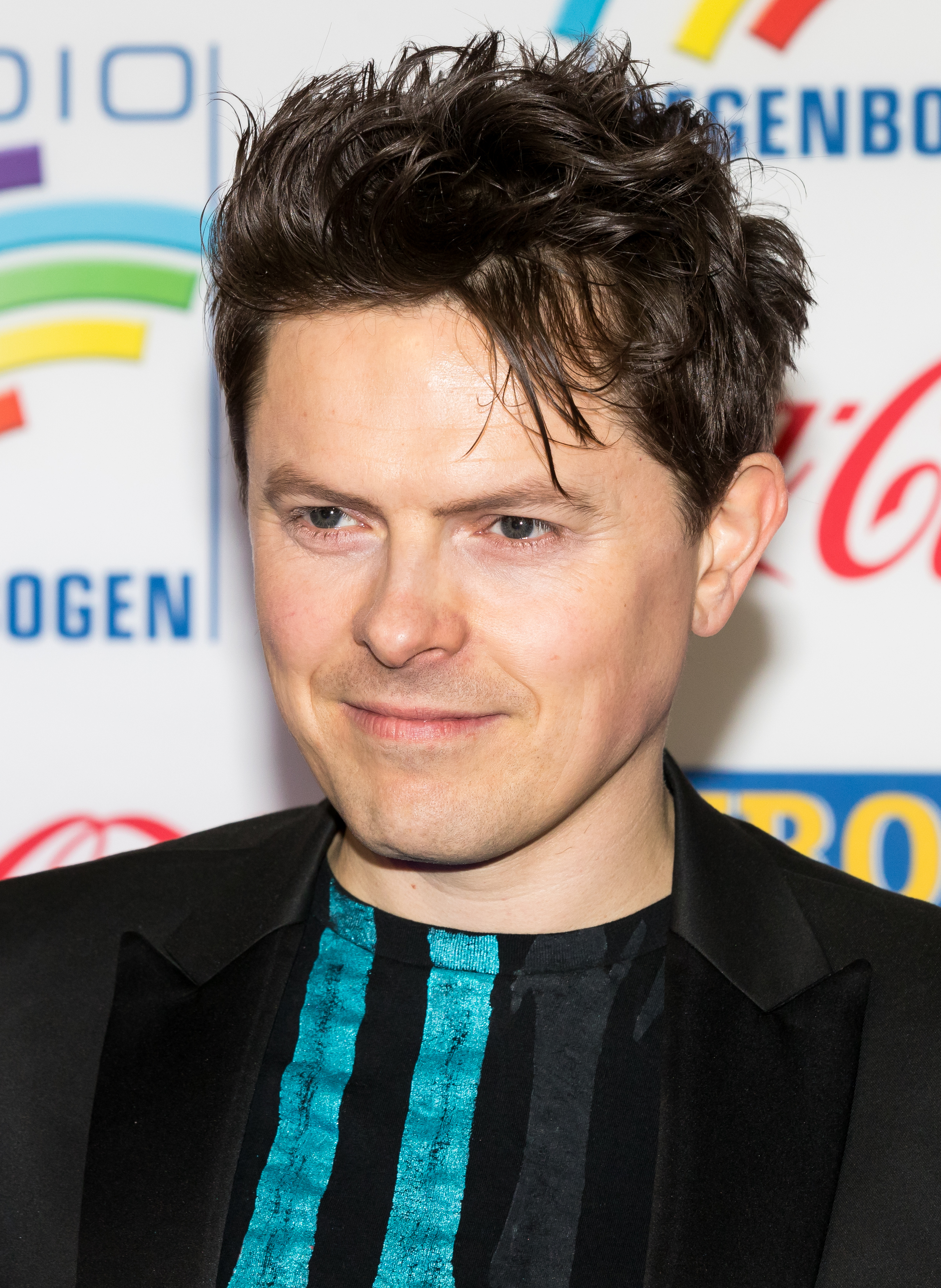
- Kelly in 2018

Background information
- Also known as: Paddy Kelly
- Born: Michael Patrick Kelly; December 5, 1977 (age 48); Dublin, Ireland
- Genres: Pop, Folk-Pop, Pop-Rock, Adult Contemporary, Soul-Pop
- Occupations: Singer, songwriter
- Spouse: Joelle Verreet (m. 2013)
- Website: michael-patrick-kelly.com

Michael Patrick Kelly (born December 5, 1977) is an Irish-American singer, musician and composer. Kelly was born in Dublin. He was a member of the pop and folk band The Kelly Family, one of the most commercially successful acts in Europe, with over 20 million records sold since the mid-1990s. After years in the public eye, Kelly released his debut solo album In Exile and shortly thereafter retired to a monastery in France. After six years he returned to the music business in 2011. Kelly currently resides in Germany. In addition to his career as a singer, he served as a coach on the eighth season of The Voice of Germany; he won the show with his artist Samuel Rösch. He also served as a coach on the second season of the German version of The Voice Senior and the fourteenth season of The Voice Kids, winning the latter with his artist Katelyn Harrington.

== Discography ==
=== Studio albums ===
List of albums, with selected chart positions, showing year released
Title	Album details	Peak positions			Certifications
Title	Album details	AUT	GER	SWI	Certifications
In Exile (as Paddy Kelly)	Released: March 17, 2003; Label: Polydor; Formats: CD, digital download	49	13	—	
Human	Released: May 15, 2015; Label: Columbia; Formats: CD, digital download	16	3	8	BVMI: Gold
Ruah	Released: September 23, 2016; Label: Columbia; Formats: CD, digital download	20	12	57	
ID	Released: June 16, 2017; Label: Columbia; Formats: CD, digital download	7	2	5	BVMI: Platinum; IFPI SWI: Gold
B.O.A.T.S	Released: November 12, 2021; Label: Columbia; Formats: CD, digital download	2	2	2	BVMI: Gold; IFPI SWI: Gold
Traces	Release date: October 31, 2025; Label: Columbia; Formats: CD, digital download	2	1	1	

=== Live albums ===
- 2013: In Live – Solo & Unplugged (as Paddy Kelly)

=== Singles ===
List of singles, with selected chart positions, showing year released and album name
Title	Year	Peak chart positions								Certifications	Album
Title	Year	AUT	EST Air.	GER	NLD	POL Air.	RUS Air.	SVK Air.	SWI	Certifications	Album
"Pray Pray Pray" (as Paddy Kelly)	2003	43	*	13	74	—	*		—		In Exile
"When You Sleep" (as Paddy Kelly)	2003	70	*	45	—	—	*		—		In Exile
"Shake Away"	2015	—	—	—	—	—	—	—	50		Human
"Golden Age"	2017	—	—	—	—	—	—	—	43		ID
"iD" (featuring Gentleman)	2017	—	—	57	—	—	—	—	60	IFPI AUT: Gold	ID
"Roundabouts"	2018	—	—	—	—	—	—	—	47		ID (Extended Version)
"Beautiful Madness"	2020	63	—	42	—	1	16	3	13	IFPI AUT: Platinum; IFPI SWI: Platinum; ZPAV: 2× Platinum	B.O.A.T.S
"Throwback"	2021	47	—	30	—	3	—	5	—	IFPI AUT: Gold; ZPAV: Platinum	B.O.A.T.S
"Blurry Eyes"	2021	—	—	45	—	—	—	10	26		B.O.A.T.S
"Best Bad Friend" (with Rea Garvey)	2022	—	—	— (Note: "Best Bad Friend" did not enter the German Singles Chart, but peaked at number 5 on the German Airplay chart.)	—	27	—	—	—		B.O.A.T.S (Extended Version)
"Wonders" (featuring Rakim)	2022	—	—	— (Note: "Wonders" did not enter the German Singles Chart, but peaked at number 3 on the German Airplay chart.)	—	1	—	2	—	ZPAV: Platinum	B.O.A.T.S (Extended Version)
"O.K.O"	2023	—	—	—	—	—	—	4	—		B.O.A.T.S (Extended Version)
"Rebellion" (with R3hab and Shaggy)	2025	—	99	—	—	15	78	—	—		Non-album single
"The One"	2025	— (Note: "The One" did not enter the Ö3 Austria Top 40 Singles chart, but peaked at number 6 on the Ö3 Austria Top 100 Airplay chart.)	—	—	—	—	—	2	— (Note: "The One" did not reach the Singles Top 100, but peaked at number 3 at the Swiss airplay chart.)		Traces
"Run Free"	2025	— (Note: "Run Free" did not reach the Ö3 Austria Top 40, but peaked at number 10 at the Austrian airplay chart.)	—	—	—	18	—	12	— (Note: "Blood Running" did not reach the Singles Top 100, but peaked at number 31 at the Swiss airplay chart.)		Traces
"Wolken" (with Johannes Oerding)	2026	—	—	—	—	—	—	—	—		Hotel
"Feel My Love" (with Take That)	2026	—	55	— (Note: "Feel My Love" did not enter the German Singles Chart, but peaked at number 23 on the German Airplay chart.)	—	21	—	—	—		Dreamers
"—" denotes a recording that did not chart or was not released in that territory. "*" denotes that the chart did not exist at that time.

=== Other releases ===
- 2015: "Beautiful Soul"
- 2017: "How Do You Love"
- 2017: "Awake"
- 2017: Sing meinen Song: Das Weihnachtskonzert Volume 4, various artists

=== Video album ===
- 2013: In Live – Solo & Unplugged (as Paddy Kelly)

== Awards and nominations ==
Year	Award	Artist/work	Category	Result	Ref.
2018	Echo Music Prize	Michael Patrick Kelly - ID	International Artist	Nominated	
2018	Radio Regenbogen	Michael Patrick Kelly	Comeback of the Year	Won	
2022	Pop Awards	Michael Patrick Kelly	Male Artist of the Year	Won	
