= B.O.A.T.S =

Studio album by Michael Patrick Kelly
- Released: November 12, 2021
- Studio: Hoxa HQ (London, UK); Jan Krause Studio (Germany); Tweedstudio (Munich, Germany); Scaramouche (Vienna, Austria); Principal Studios (Senden, Germany); Toolhouse Studios (Rotenburg an der Fulda, Germany); Air Studios (London, UK)
- Genre: Pop rock
- Length: 57:27
- Label: Columbia; Sony Music
- Producer: Abaz; Daniel Flamm; Decco; Jimmy Hogarth; Johannes Herbst; Klaus Sahm; Lukas Hillebrand; Michael Patrick Kelly; Philipp Steinke; Robin Grubert; Tobias Kuhn; Vincent Sorg; X-Plosive

Michael Patrick Kelly chronology
| iD (2017) | B.O.A.T.S (2021) | Traces (2025) |

Singles from B.O.A.T.S
- 1. "Beautiful Madness" Released: May 1, 2020; 2. "Throwback" Released: July 23, 2021; 3. "Blurry Eyes" Released: 2022; 4. "Best Bad Friend" Released: May 13, 2022; 5. "O.K.O" Released: May 26, 2023

Professional ratings
Review scores
| Source | Rating |
|---|---|
| laut.de | 2/5 stars |

B.O.A.T.S is the fifth solo studio album by Irish-American musician Michael Patrick Kelly. It was released on 12 November 2021 through Columbia/Sony Music. Recording sessions took place at Hoxa HQ and Air Studios in London, Jan Krause Studio, Tweedstudio and Principal Studios and Toolhouse Studios in Germany, and Scaramouche in Vienna. Production was handled by Kelly himself together with Jimmy Hogarth, Daniel Flamm, Decco, Johannes Herbst, Robin Grubert, Lukas Hillebrand, Abaz, Klaus Sahm, Philipp Steinke, Tobias Kuhn, Vincent Sorg and X-Plosive. It features a guest appearance from Ilse DeLange.

The album reached number 2 in Austria, Germany and Switzerland, number 8 in Poland, and number 187 in Flanders. It was certified Gold by the Bundesverband Musikindustrie and IFPI Switzerland.

== Track listing ==
| No. | Title | Writer(s) | Producer(s) | Length |
|---|---|---|---|---|
| 1. | "Boats" | Michael Patrick Kelly; James Dearness Hogarth | Paddy Kelly; Jimmy Hogarth; Luke Glazewski (ass.) | 4:34 |
| 2. | "Diamonds & Metals" | Kelly; Hogarth | Paddy Kelly; Jimmy Hogarth; Daniel Flamm (add.); Luke Glazewski (ass.) | 4:14 |
| 3. | "Running Blind" | Kelly; John Thomas Roach; Jintae Ko | Paddy Kelly; Daniel Flamm; Lukas Hillebrand; Jimmy Hogarth (add.); Jonas Mengler (voc.) | 3:17 |
| 4. | "Blurry Eyes" | Kelly; Daniel Bryer; Mike Needle | Paddy Kelly; Jimmy Hogarth; Daniel Flamm; Johannes Herbst; Robin Grubert | 3:36 |
| 5. | "Throwback" | Kelly; Sebastian Arman; Joacim Persson | Paddy Kelly; DECCO | 2:30 |
| 6. | "Fake Messiah" | Kelly; Imran Abbas; Thomas Keßler; Elżbieta Steinmetz | Paddy Kelly; Abaz; X-Plosive; Jimmy Hogarth (add.) | 3:21 |
| 7. | "Paragliding" | Kelly; Daniel Flamm; Robin Grubert | Paddy Kelly; Daniel Flamm; Robin Grubert | 4:05 |
| 8. | "Beautiful Madness" | Kelly; Arman; Persson | Paddy Kelly; DECCO | 2:56 |
| 9. | "Earthquake" | Kelly; David Rhodes; Jack Gourlay | Paddy Kelly; Jimmy Hogarth; Daniel Flamm; Johannes Herbst | 3:31 |
| 10. | "Mother's Day" | Kelly; Philipp Steinke; Tobias Kuhn | Paddy Kelly; Jimmy Hogarth; Philipp Steinke; Tobias Kuhn | 3:33 |
| 11. | "The World" (featuring Ilse DeLange) | Kelly; Flamm; Christoph Koterzina; Markus Schlichtherle | Paddy Kelly; Jimmy Hogarth; Daniel Flamm | 2:57 |
| 12. | "America" | Kelly; Alexander Zuckowski; Flamm | Paddy Kelly; Daniel Flamm; Vincent Sorg | 4:57 |
| 13. | "Thank You" | Kelly; Zuckowski; Flamm | Paddy Kelly; Jimmy Hogarth; Daniel Flamm; Johannes Herbst (add.) | 3:48 |
| 14. | "Icon" | Kelly; Anders Grahn; Andre Lindal | Paddy Kelly; Jimmy Hogarth; Peter Seifert (add.) | 3:29 |
| 15. | "Home" | Kelly; Zuckowski; Flamm | Paddy Kelly; Jimmy Hogarth; Daniel Flamm; Matthias Oldofredi (add.) | 5:18 |
| 16. | "Boats (Reprise)" | Kelly; Hogarth | Paddy Kelly; Jimmy Hogarth; Daniel Flamm; Klaus Sahm | 1:21 |
| Total length: | | | | 57:27 |

Extended Edition
| No. | Title | Writer(s) | Producer(s) | Length |
|---|---|---|---|---|
| 17. | "Best Bad Friend" (featuring Rea Garvey) | Raymond Michael Garvey; Nicolas Rebscher; Martin Gallop | Nicolas Rebscher |
| 18. | "Wonders" | Flamm; Grubert | Daniel Flamm; Johannes Herbst; Robin Grubert; Michael Ilbert |
| 19. | "Two Mothers" | Jimmy Harry | Paddy Kelly; Jimmy Hogarth |
| 20. | "O.K.O" | Kelly; Hogarth; Flamm; Koterzina; Schlichtherle | Paddy Kelly; Jimmy Hogarth; Daniel Flamm; Michael Ilbert |
| 21. | "Good Morning Sunshine" | Michael Geldreich; René Miller | Michael Geldreich; Benedikt Schoeller |
| 22. | "When Sorry Ain’t Good Enough" | Kelly; Hogarth | Paddy Kelly; Jimmy Hogarth |

== Charts ==
=== Weekly charts ===
| Chart (2021) | Peak position |
|---|---|
| Austrian Albums (Ö3 Austria) | 2 |
| Belgian Albums (Ultratop Flanders) | 187 |
| German Albums (Offizielle Top 100) | 2 |
| Polish Albums (ZPAV) | 8 |
| Swiss Albums (Schweizer Hitparade) | 2 |

=== Year-end charts ===
| Chart (2021) | Position |
|---|---|
| German Albums (Offizielle Top 100) | 27 |
| Swiss Albums (Schweizer Hitparade) | 65 |
| Chart (2022) | Position |
| German Albums (Offizielle Top 100) | 21 |
| Swiss Albums (Schweizer Hitparade) | 44 |
| Chart (2023) | Position |
| German Albums (Offizielle Top 100) | 92 |

== Certifications ==
| Region | Certification | Certified units/sales |
|---|---|---|
| Germany (BVMI) | Gold | 100,000^{‡} |
| Hungary (MAHASZ) | Gold | 2,000^{‡} |
| Poland (ZPAV) | Platinum | 20,000^{‡} |
| Switzerland (IFPI Switzerland) | Gold | 10,000^{‡} |
^{‡} Sales+streaming figures based on certification alone.
