= Kin Ping Meh =

German rock band

- Origin: Mannheim, Germany
- Genres: Rock, progressive rock, krautrock, pop rock
- Years active: 1970–1976; 2005–present
- Labels: Polydor, Zebra, Bacillus
- Members: Geff Harrison; Gagey Mrozeck; Alan "Joe" Wroe; Frieder Schmitt
- Past members: Werner Stephan; Joachim Schafer; Frieder Schmitt; Torsten Herzog; Kalle Weber; Willie Wagner

Kin Ping Meh is a German rock band originally active from 1970 to 1977, and reformed in 2005. Their name is derived from Franz Kuhn's German translation of the Chinese novel Jin Ping Mei.

The band was founded in 1969 in Mannheim by Joachim Schäfer, Werner Stephan, Frieder Schmitt, Torsten Herzog, Kalle Weber and Willie Wagner. (part of the original group was the school band "Thunderbirds" and the regional pop band "Take Five").

The band was discovered by Polydor Records in a competition of Bild am Sonntag on the Reeperbahn in 1970 and recorded the single Everything 's My Way / Woman and shortly after the second single, Alexandra / Everyday. In 1971, the first album was released and then in 2004 was re-released. It followed no. 2 album from 1972, and the third album appeared in 1973. The fourth album was Virtues and Sins of 1974, which also appeared in Argentina, namely as Virtudes y Pecados. The album cover was designed by graphic designer and photographer Günter Blum, who created the graphic for the double LP Concrete in 1976 as well.

In 1977 appeared the last LP, Kin Ping Meh. AllMusic remarked about it, "most of the album's content is simply adequate and marginally derivative of the heavier hitting acts of the early '70s."

There were also three compilations - 1973 Rock Sensations with recordings of the second and third LP, 1981 Rock in Germany Vol. 4 and 1991 Hazy Age on Stage on 180 grams vinyl, which contains live recordings 1971-1973.

A band member in the course of the band's leader was the guitarist Gagey Mrozeck, who later played for Herbert Grönemeyer and then worked as a music producer with artists such as Udo Lindenberg.

Other late members were the keyboarder Chris Axel Klöber (born August 31, 1948), who had previously played with the Berlin band Curly Curve and Geff Harrison (born August 24, 1947), the former singer of Twenty Sixty Six and Then, who later started the Geff Harrison Band.

== Personnel ==
=== Current ===
- Geff Harrison - lead vocals
- Gagey Mrozeck - guitar
- Alan "Joe" Wroe - bass guitar
- Frieder Schmitt - organ, piano

=== Former ===
- Werner Stephan - lead vocals
- Michael Pozz - lead vocals
- Joachim Schafer - guitar, piano, backing vocals
- Frieder Schmitt - organ, piano
- Torsten Herzog - bass guitar
- Kalle Weber - drums

== Albums ==
- Kin Ping Meh (1971)
- No. 2 (1972)
- III (1973)
- Virtues And Sins (1974)
- Concrete (1976)
- Kin Ping Meh (1977)
- Hazy Age On Stage (1991)
