= Wolfgang Zabba Lindner =

German drummer and composer

Wolfgang Lindner
- Born: 15 December 1949; Köthen
- Died: 23 June 2017; Hamburg

Wolfgang "Zabba" Lindner was a German drummer and composer.

He came to Hamburg with his family via Mannheim in the early 1960s. His father Max Lindner was the first drummer in the NDR Symphony Orchestra led by Hans Schmidt-Isserstedt and Günter Wand for more than 20 years.

Lindner played jazz and rock, taught seminars at schools, gave workshops and worked in the crossover area. He wrote several symphonies, i.e. the "Mountain Rock Symphony" and performed in Bad Reichenhall and Berchtesgaden in 2003/2004 together with the Philharmonic Orchestra Bad Reichenhall and the Junge Philharmonie Salzburg. He also played together with acts such as Sphinx Tush, Tomorrow's Gift, Release Music Orchestra, the Even Mind Orchestra, ES, and Full Service.

While living in Hamburg, Lindner formed the duo The Two with saxophonist Kurt Buschmann. Since January 2016, Lindner was performing concerts of his compositions "Melodies of the Hamburg Symphony."

== Discography (selection) ==
=== Tomorrow's Gift ===
1973: Goodbye Future (fried egg)

=== Release Music Orchestra ===
1974: Life ([[Brain]])

1975: Garuda (Brain)

1976: Get The Ball (Brain)

=== ES ===
1979: Wham Bang (Fran Records)

=== Zabba Lindner & The Rhythm 'Stix ===
1982: Extra Ordinaire (Sky Records)
