= Tritonus (band) =

German progressive rock band

- Origin: Mannheim, Germany
- Genres: Progressive rock; space music; Krautrock
- Years active: 1972–1979
- Labels: Triple Music, Germanofon, Belle Antique, Acanta, BASF, Sireena Records, Paradis, Media Arte
- Past members: Peter K. Seiler; Charlie Jöst; Ronald Brand; Rolf-Dieter Schnapka; Bernhard Schuh
- Website: www.peterseiler.de

Tritonus was a German progressive rock band, active from 1972 to 1979 and based in Mannheim. The band was founded by the synth player Peter K. Seiler, bassist Ronald Brand, and percussionist Charlie Jöst. Additionally, Seiler served as the band's manager. The band has been inspired by English progressive band Emerson, Lake and Palmer, complete with heavy use of keyboards and English vocals.

== History ==
=== Formation (1972–1973) ===
Peter K. Seiler grew up listening to piano and organ music performed by his father and took classical piano lessons at seven years old. He admired works of such pianists as Jimmy Smith, Keith Emerson, and Brian Auger. Before co-founding Tritonus, Seiler played in two other bands on a semi-professional basis, one of which was called Mohn & Gedaechtnis.

Tritonus was founded in 1972, when Seiler met the bass player, Ronald Brand, in a music club called "Genesis" in Mannheim. They recruited percussionist Charlie Jöst, and in early 1973 started rehearsals developing their own material. The name Tritonus comes from the Tritone, a musical interval spanning three adjacent whole tones (six semitones) and corresponds to an augmented fourth. The interval was uncommon in classical music, and the band thought it would be a suitable name for three musicians with "classical roots". Before recording their debut album, Seiler bought a Mini Moog synthesizer, which he has said was an important step of his career.

=== First recordings (1973–1975) ===
In 1973, Tritonus were commissioned by a local DJ, who liked the band and wanted to produce their single, a "cover version of a US hit". The band recorded the cover, taped with an 8-track recorder, but the producer didn't like it and abandoned the idea of producing them. The band instead recorded an original composition at their own expense on their label, releasing it as "The Way of Spending Time". According to Seiler, it "received a lot of airplay on almost all German radio stations, which in turn drew national attention" to Tritonus.

The band booked concerts all year round, according to Seiler, "sometimes about 80–90 gigs in a year", where they performed their own repertoire, alongside a composition created by Finnish composer Jean Sibelius. At one festival, they played as an opening act along with Scorpions, and had a concert with Triumvirat in the Cologne club "Tanzbrunnen".

=== Tritonus and Between The Universes (1975–1976) ===
After appearing on a significant national TV show and winning a national band competition, Tritonus was approached with offers from major labels to publish their debut album. Seiler and Brand composed a "symphonic poem for a symphony orchestra" and wanted to release it as a part of their debut; however, labels refused to finance them, believing their act hadn't been established enough to release such a project. In retrospect, Seiler agreed that their initial view for the record "proved to be a mistake".

In 1975, they produced their Tritonus LP in the Bauer recording studio in Ludwigsburg, taking a bank loan to spend four days in the studio. It was recorded with a Studer 16 track without an orchestra, but utilizing additional studio instruments such as timpani, tubular bells, and marimba. The drummer, Charlie Jöst, didn't believe it would be successful and left the band before the album was finished. The remaining duo started offering the finished product to record labels and got two offers. Seiler chose the BASF label based on the positive first impression with the A&R people.

In 1976, Tritonus recorded their second album, Between the Universes, produced by Seiler with a bigger budget spent on the studio recordings, better advertising, a 24-track recorder, and enough money to hire a choir and guest musicians. The album was composed solely with synthesizers. In 1977, Seiler recorded his last song with the band, "Timewinds of Life".

Tritonus broke up in 1979, due to other commitments outside the band, and with Seiler starting his solo career composing music for national television, including such broadcasting companies as ZDF and ARD.

== Instruments and music ==
Throughout his career, Peter K. Seiler interchangeably used a Mini Moog synthesizer, Hammond organ A-100, Mellotron, Hohner Clavinet, Hohner String Ensemble, and Wurlitzer E-Piano. Ronald Brand was equipped with Fender Jazz Bass.

The first, self-titled album was a conventional symphonic rock recording; the second, Between the Universes, featured more-evolved synth arrangements and a new vocalist, Geff Harrison. Most of the band's lyrics were written by Seiler, with some titles written in collaboration with Ronald Brand.

== Discography ==
=== Albums ===
- 1975: Tritonus (LP)
- 1976: Between the Universes (LP)
- 2015: Far in the Sky-Live at Stagge's Hotel 1977 (CD)

=== Singles & EPs ===
- 1973: The Way of Spending Time / Kite
- 1977: The Trojan Horse Race / Timewinds of Life

=== In compilations ===
- 1976: Rock Offers
- 1976: German Rock Scene Vol. II
- 2008: Krautrock... and Beyond: Part 6
- 2012: Krautrock: Music for Your Brain Vol. 5

== Members ==
- Keyboards: Peter K. Seiler (1972–79, 2015)
- Bass, vocals, acoustic guitar: Ronald Brand (1972–77)
- Bass, vocals: Rolf-Dieter Schnapka (1977–79, 2015)
- Drums: Charlie Jöst (1972–76), Bernhard Schuh (1976), Arthur Weiss (2015)
- Guest vocals: Geff Harrison (1976)

== See also ==
- Carl August Tidemann, founder of the similarly named Norwegian band.
