= Madsen discography =

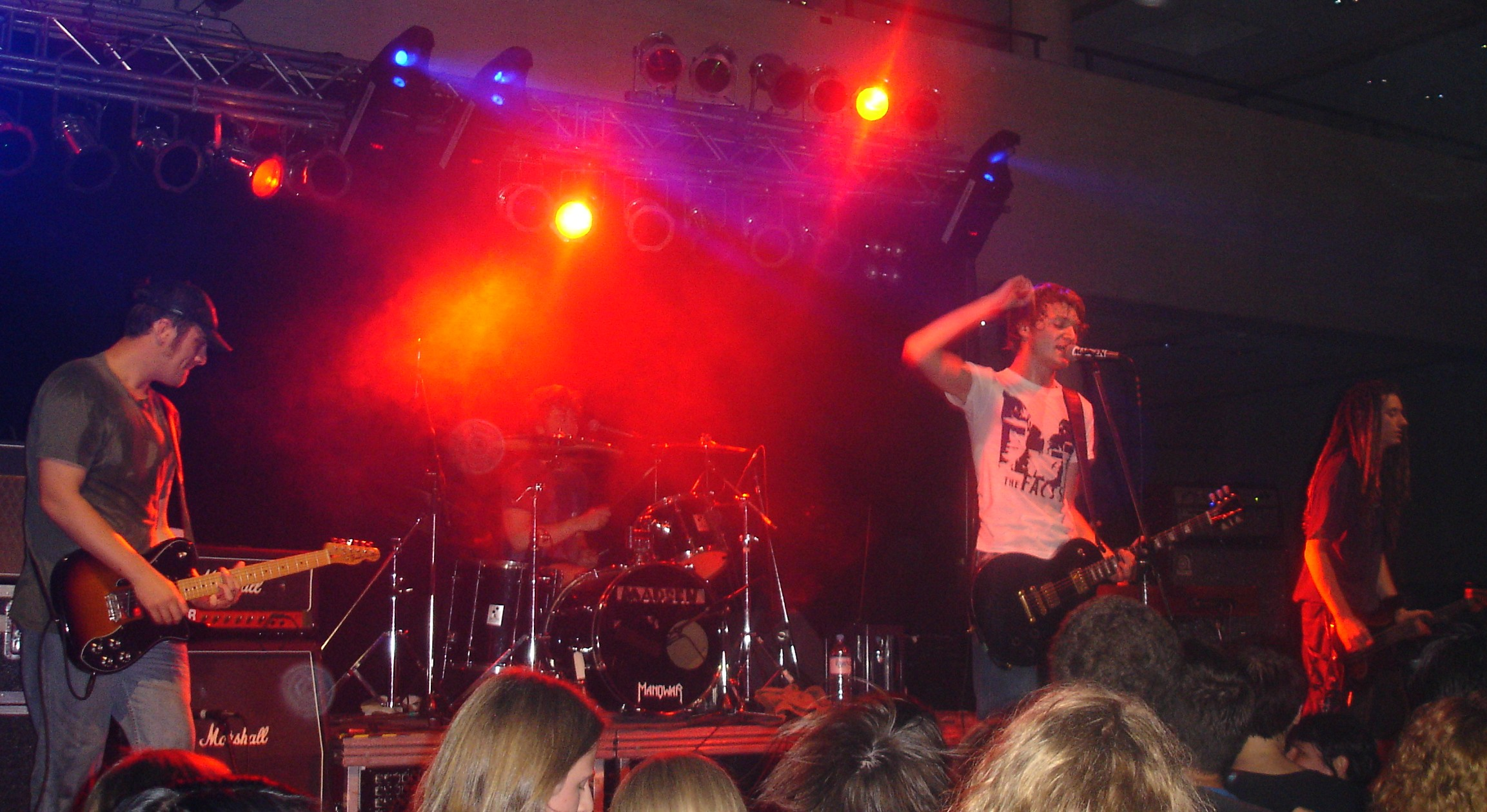
- Madsen performing at Campus Live Open Air in 2005
- Studio albums: 10
- EPs: 1
- Live albums: 2
- Singles: 16
- Video albums: 3
- Music videos: 19

This discography is an overview of the musical works of German indie rock band Madsen. The most successful release from Madsen is the number one album, Hollywood.

== Studio albums ==
List of albums, with selected chart positions
Title	Album details	Peak chart positions		
Title	Album details	GER	AUT	SWI
Madsen	Released: May 30, 2005; Label: Vertigo Records; Format: CD, LP	23	39	—
Goodbye Logik	Released: August 11, 2006; Label: Vertigo Records; Format: CD, LP	8	18	—
Frieden im Krieg	Released: March 7, 2008; Label: Vertigo Records; Format: CD, LP	6	28	—
Labyrinth	Released: April 23, 2010; Label: Vertigo Records; Format: CD, LP	7	25	—
Wo es beginnt	Released: August 17, 2012; Label: Columbia Records; Format: CD, LP	2	4	84
Kompass	Released: August 14, 2015; Label: Four Music; Format: CD, LP	5	10	—
Lichtjahre	Released: June 15, 2018; Label: Arising Empire; Format: CD, LP	3	20	—
Na gut dann nicht	Released: Oktober 9, 2020; Label: Arising Empire; Format: CD, LP	7	—	—
Hollywood	Released: August 18 2023; Label: Four Music; Format: CD, LP	1	60	—
Die Weihnachtsplatte	Released: December 6 2024; Label: Goodbye Logik (Indigo); Format: CD, LP	32	—	—
"—" denotes a recording that did not chart or was not released in that territory.

== Live albums ==
List of albums, with selected chart positions
Title	Album details	Peak chart positions
Title	Album details	GER
10 Jahre Madsen Live	Released: June 13, 2014; Label: Columbia Records; Format: CD	22
Lichtjahre Live	Released: 21 February 2020; Label: Arising Empire; Format: CD	17

== EPs ==
- 2011: Willkommen bei Madsen (5-Track-EP mit Coverversionen)

== Singles ==
List of singles, with selected chart positions
Title	Year	Peak chart positions			Album
Title	Year	GER	AUT	SWI	Album
"Die Perfektion"	2005	67	—	—	Madsen
"Immer mehr"	2005	96	—	—	Madsen
"Vielleicht"	2005	—	—	—	Madsen
"Du schreibst Geschichte"	2006	55	54	—	Goodbye Logik
"Goodbye Logik"	2006	—	—	—	Goodbye Logik
"Der Moment"	2007	95	—	—	Goodbye Logik
"Ein Sturm"	2007	—	—	—	Goodbye Logik
"Nachtbaden"	2008	60	74	—	Frieden im Krieg
"Verschwende dich nicht"	2008	93	—	—	Frieden im Krieg
"Liebeslied"	2008	—	—	—	Frieden im Krieg
"Lass die Liebe regieren"	2010	50	—	—	Labyrinth
"Mein Herz bleibt hier"	2010	—	—	—	Labyrinth
"Lass die Musik an"	2012	81	—	—	Wo es beginnt
"Love Is a Killer" (featuring Walter Schreifels)	2012	—	—	—	Wo es beginnt
"—" denotes a recording that did not chart or was not released in that territory.

=== Other releases ===
- 2014: Hey Hey Wickie
- 2015: Inkognito
- 2017: Bumm! Bumm! Bumm! (feat. König Boris)

=== Other appearances ===
- 2014: K.B.A.G. (Jennifer Rostock feat. Feine Sahne Fischfilet, Großstadtgeflüster, MC Fitti & Madsen)

== Video albums ==
- 2010: Labyrinth (Limited Deluxe Edition)
- 2012: Wo es beginnt (Deluxe Edition)
- 2014: 10 Jahre Madsen Live

== Music videos ==
List of music videos, with directors
Title	Year	Director	Album
"Die Perfektion"	2005	AlexandLiane	Madsen
"Immer mehr"	2005	AlexandLiane	Madsen
"Vielleicht"	2005	Daniel Harder	Madsen
"Du schreibst Geschichte"	2006	Daniel Harder	Goodbye Logik
"Goodbye Logik"	2006	Sven Bollinger	Goodbye Logik
"Der Moment"	2007	AlexandLiane	Goodbye Logik
"Ein Sturm"	2007	Marc Helfers	Goodbye Logik
"Nachtbaden"	2008	Marc Helfers	Frieden im Krieg
"Verschwende dich nicht"	2008	Marc Helfers	Frieden im Krieg
"Liebeslied"	2008	Marc Helfers	Frieden im Krieg
"Lass die Liebe regieren"	2010	Marc Helfers	Labyrinth
"Mein Herz bleibt hier"	2010	Hagen Decker	Labyrinth
"Lass die Musik an"	2012	Hinrich Pflug	Wo es beginnt
"Love Is a Killer"	2012	Joffrey Jans, Kai Kurve	Wo es beginnt
"Baut wieder auf"	2012	Hinrich Pflug, Patrick Wilfert	Wo es beginnt
"Sirenen"	2015	Sander Houtkruijer	Kompass
"Küss mich"	2015	Esther Bialas, Nathan Nill	Kompass
"Kompass"	2015	Kim Frank	Kompass
"Bumm! Bumm! Bumm!"	2017	Stephen Erckmann, Kay Özdemir	
