= The Voice Senior (German TV series) =

- Genre: Reality television
- Created by: John de Mol
- Developed by: Talpa Content
- Presented by: Lena Gercke; Thore Schölermann; Melissa Khalaj
- Judges: The BossHoss; Mark Forster; Sasha Schmitz; Yvonne Catterfeld; Michael Patrick Kelly; Samu Haber
- Theme music composer: Martijn Schimmer
- Composer: Klaus Lindenburg
- Country of origin: Germany
- Original language: German
- No. of seasons: 2
- No. of episodes: 8

Production
- Producers: Talpa Productions; Schwartzkopff TV-Productions
- Production locations: Studio Adlershof, Berlin
- Running time: 120 minutes (inc. adverts)

Original release
- Network: Sat.1
- Release: December 23, 2018 – December 15, 2019

Related
- The Voice of Germany; The Voice Kids; The Voice (franchise); The Voice Senior

The Voice Senior was a German reality talent show created by John de Mol, based on the concept The Voice of Germany. However, participation is only open for candidates more than 60 years old. It began airing on December 23, 2018 on Sat.1, but after the second season the producers and the tv channel cancelled the show, due to low ratings.

There were four different stages to the show: producers' auditions, blind auditions, sing-offs, and finale. There have been two winners: Dan Lucas (64) and Monika Smets (68).

The show was originally presented by current hosts of The Voice of Germany, Lena Gercke and Thore Schölermann. The coaches were feature familiar faces from The Voice of Germany and The Voice Kids, including Mark Forster, The BossHoss, Yvonne Catterfeld, Sasha Schmitz and Michael Patrick Kelly.

The German version of The Voice Senior was the third version of The Voice Senior produced worldwide, after the original Dutch version and the Russian version.

== Format ==
The show adopts the same format as The Voice of Germany, but only four episodes are planned.

=== Blind auditions ===
Similar to multiple The Voice versions, in the Blind Audition, the contestant sings in front of the coaches and the live audience in the studio. Since the coaches' chairs turn their backs to the stage, they can only hear and cannot see the contestant. By pressing the red button in front of them, the chair turns towards the stage, thus the contestant is chosen to join the coach's team. If a contestant receives more than one chair turn, he/she will have the right to choose which team they want to join.

The Blind Audition is taped at Studio Adlershof in Berlin.

=== Sing offs ===
In the second phase, the five contestants from each team perform a song. Only two of them are selected by their coach to advance to the final round.

=== Live finale ===
In the last phase, the live finale, the remaining two contestants in each team first compete against each other. The respective coach then makes the decision as to which artist moves into the top 4. Then the four remaining artists from each team sing a second song, and this time televoting determines who will be The Voice Senior winner.

== Production ==
On December 17, 2017, Sat.1 announced they would produce a new singing competition for singers over the age of 60, entitled Talpa's The Voice Senior. On June 29, 2018, the coaching panel for the first season was confirmed with Mark Forster, The BossHoss, and Yvonne Catterfeld, all of whom have been coaches in the adult version, as well as Sasha Schmitz, who was previously a coach on The Voice Kids. On May 22, 2019, Michael Patrick Kelly was announced to make the switch from The Voice of Germany to replace Forster for the second season.

Hosts of The Voice of Germany Thore Schölermann and Lena Gercke, announced that they would also host The Voice Senior.

== Coaches and presenters ==
=== Coaches ===
On June 29, 2018; the coaching panel for the first season was confirmed with Mark Forster, The BossHoss, Yvonne Catterfeld, all of whom have been coaches in the adult version; and Sasha Schmitz, who was previously a coach on The Voice Kids. On May 22, 2019, Michael Patrick Kelly was announced as a new coach replacing Forster on the second season, switching role from the main adult show.

The Voice Senior coaches
| Presenter | Seasons | |
| Presenter | 1 | 2 |
|---|---|---|
| BossHoss | | |
| Sasha | | |
| Yvonne | | |
| Mark | | |
| Michael Patrick | | |

Coaches gallery

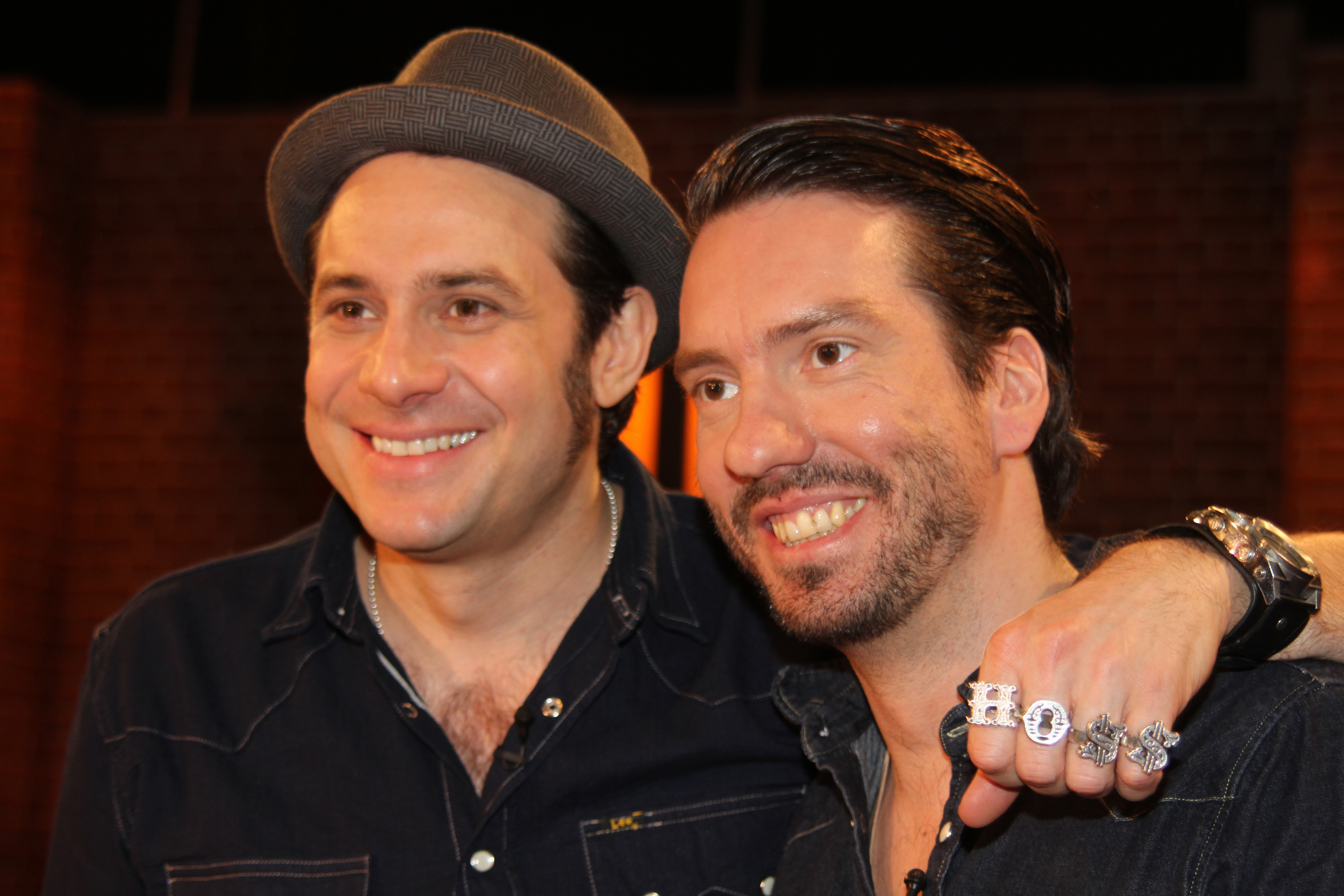
The BossHoss (2018–2019)

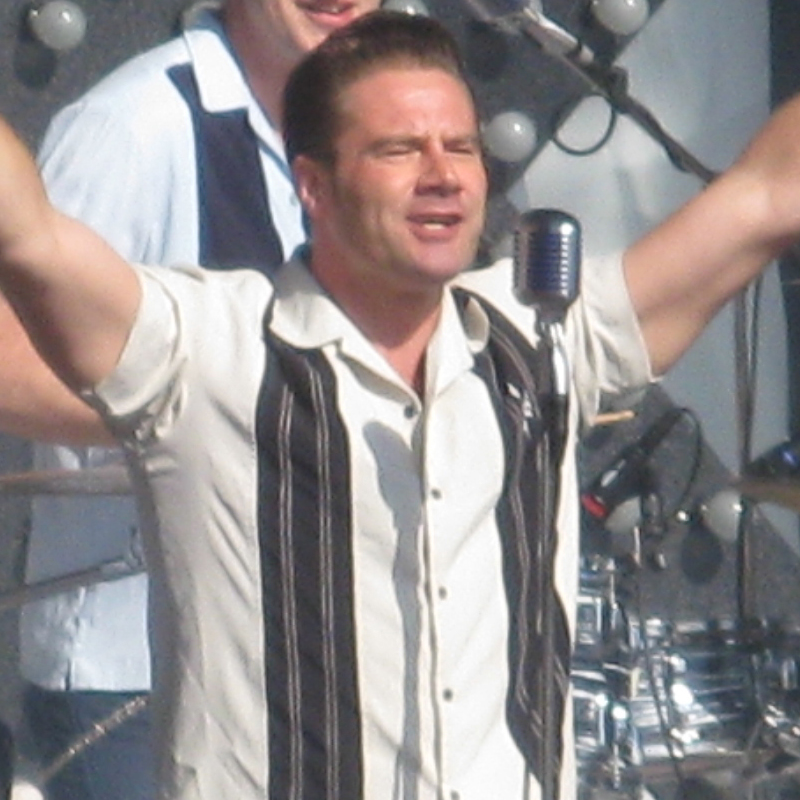
Sasha Schmitz (2018–2019)

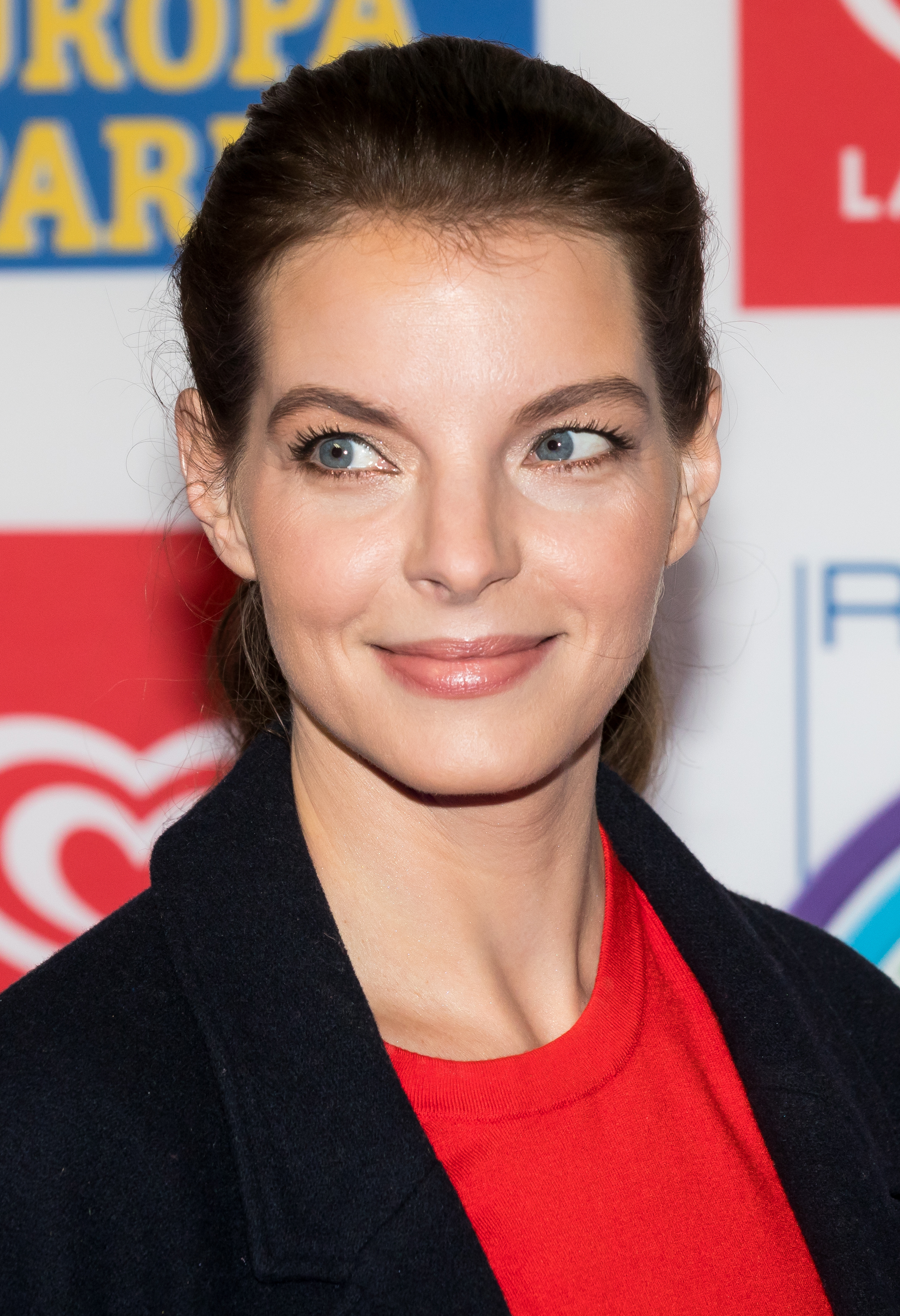
Yvonne Catterfeld (2018–2019)

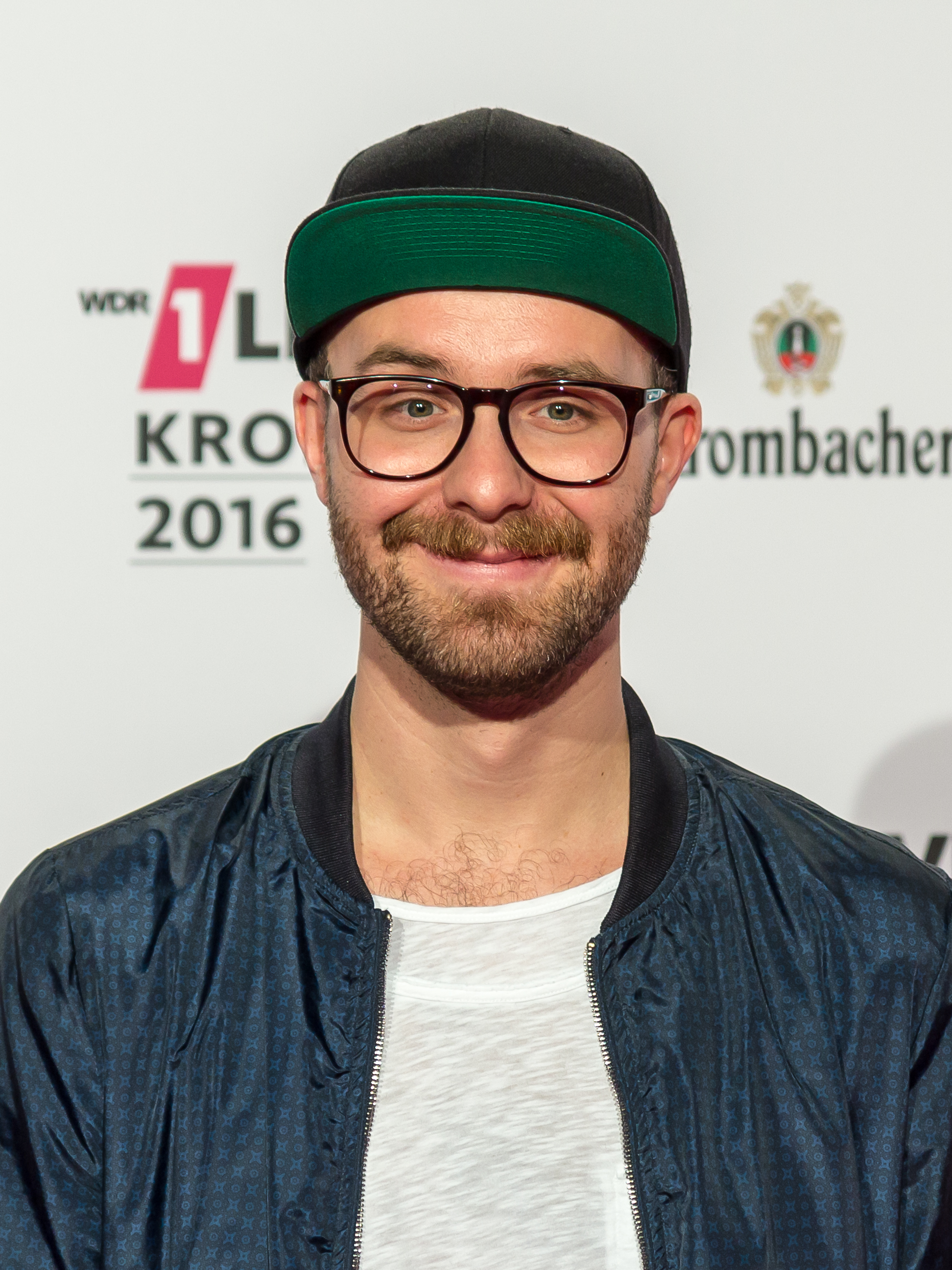
Mark Forster (2018–2019)

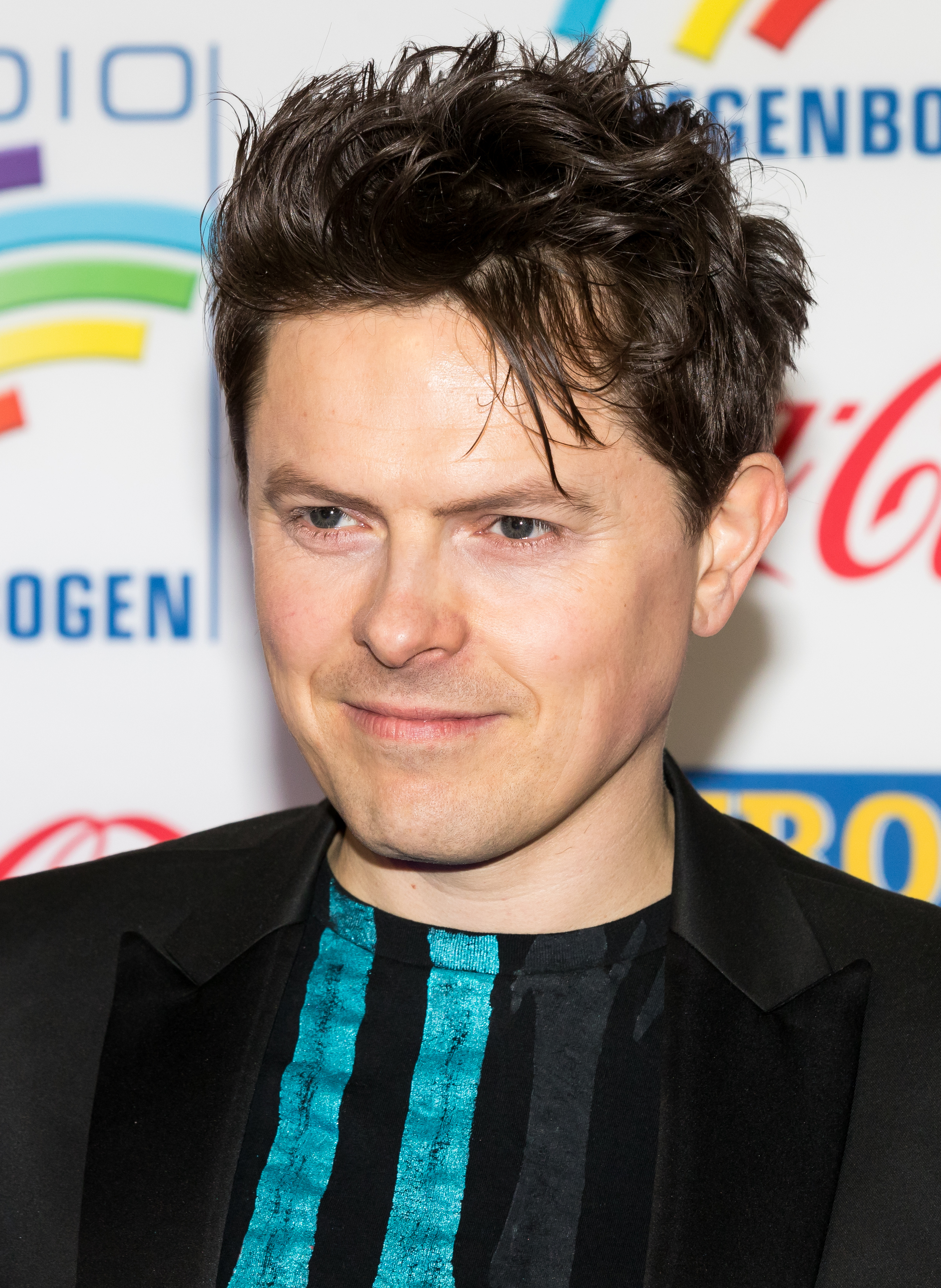
Michael Patrick Kelly (2019)

=== Presenters ===
Current hosts of The Voice of Germany, Thore Schölermann and Lena Gercke, appointed as hosts for the show.

The Voice Senior presenters
| Presenter | Seasons | |
| Presenter | 1 | 2 |
|---|---|---|
| Lena | | |
| Thore | | |

Presenters gallery

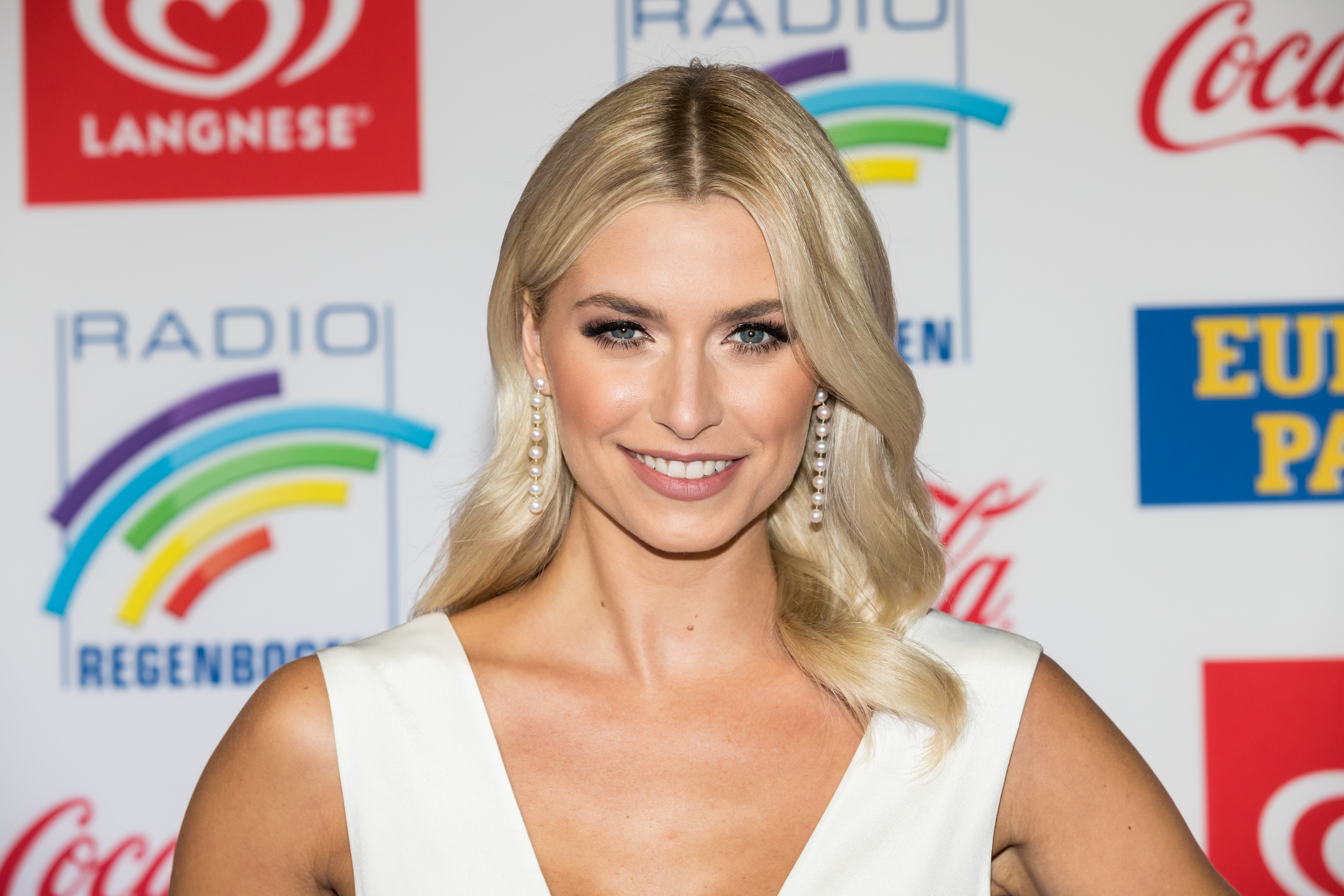
Lena Gercke (2018–2019)

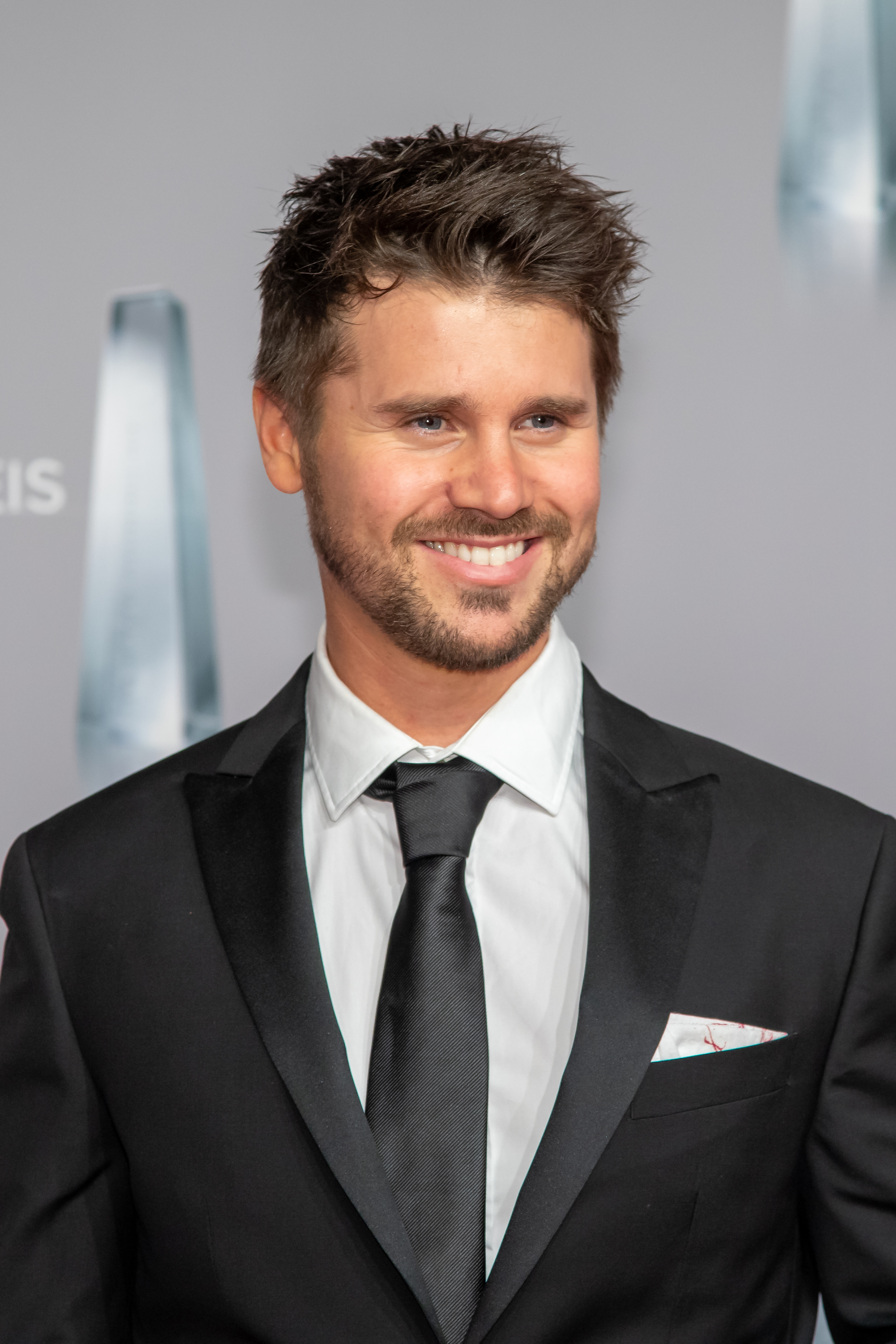
Thore Schölermann (2018–2019)

== Coaches and finalists ==
Winner
Runner-up
Third place
Fourth place

Winners are in bold, the finalists in the finale are in italicized font, and the eliminated artists are in small font.

| Season | Coaches and their finalists | | | |
| 1 | Mark Forster | The BossHoss | Yvonne Catterfeld | Sasha Schmitz |
|---|---|---|---|---|
| 1 | Joerg Kemp; Giselle Rommel | Willi Stein; Wolfgang Schorer | Fritz Bliesener; Janice Harrington | **Dan Lucas**; Gabriele Treftz |
| 2 | Michael Patrick Kelly | The BossHoss | Yvonne Catterfeld | Sasha Schmitz |
| 2 | Silvia Christoph; Eva Norel | Dieter Bürkle; Renate Akkermann | Dennis Legree; Michael Poteat | **Monika Smets**; Claus Diercks |

== Series overview ==
German The Voice Senior series overview
| Season | First aired | Last aired | Winner | Other finalists | | | Winning coach | Presenters | Coaches (chairs' order) | | | |
| Season | First aired | Last aired | Winner | Other finalists | | | Winning coach | Presenters | 1 | 2 | 3 | 4 |
|---|---|---|---|---|---|---|---|---|---|---|---|---|
| 1 | 23 Dec 2018 | 4 Jan 2019 | Dan Lucas | Fritz Bliesener | Joerg Kemp | Willi Stein | Sasha Schmitz | Lena Gercke, Thore Schölermann | Mark | BossHoss | Yvonne | Sasha |
| 2 | 24 Nov 2019 | 15 Dec 2019 | Monika Smets | Dennis Legree | Dieter Bürkle | Silvia Christoph | Sasha Schmitz | Lena Gercke, Thore Schölermann | Michael Patrick | BossHoss | Yvonne | Sasha |

=== Season 1 (2018–19) ===
The first season of The Voice Senior in Germany premiered on December 23, 2018, and ended on January 4, 2019, with Mark Forster, Yvonne Catterfeld, Sasha Schmitz and The BossHoss as coaches and Lena Gercke and Thore Schölermann as hosts. The winner of the first season was Dan Lucas from team Sasha.

=== Season 2 (2019) ===
The second season premiered on November 24, 2019, and ended on December 15, 2019, with returning coaches Catterfeld, Schmitz, and BossHoss, along with new coach Michael Patrick Kelly. Gercke and Schölermann both returned as hosts. The winner of the second season was Monika Smets from team Sasha.

== Reception ==
=== Ratings ===
| Season | Time slot | Episodes | Premiered | | Ended | | TV season | Average viewers (millions) |
| Season | Time slot | Episodes | Date | Viewers (millions) | Date | Viewers (millions) | TV season | Average viewers (millions) |
|---|---|---|---|---|---|---|---|---|
| One | Fridays 8:15 pm Sundays 8:15 pm | 4 | December 23, 2018 | 3.13 | January 4, 2019 | 2.20 | 2018–2019 | **2.45** |
| Two | Sundays 8:15 pm | 4 | November 24, 2019 | 2.48 | December 15, 2019 | 1.62 | 2019–2020 | **1.90** |
