= Toca (album) =

Studio album by Fragma
- Released: 2001
- Recorded: 1999–2000
- Genre: Trance
- Label: Positiva
- Producer: Ramon Zenker; Dirk Duderstadt; Marco Duderstadt

Fragma chronology
Toca (2001)	Embrace (2002)

Singles from Toca
- 1. "Toca Me" Released: 1999; 2. "Toca's Miracle" Released: 10 April 2000; 3. "Everytime You Need Me" Released: 8 January 2001; 4. "You Are Alive" Released: 4 June 2001

Toca is the debut album by German trance group Fragma. It was released on 22 January 2001 through EMI Europe.

== Singles ==
The album includes the group's initial three singles released in the years prior and spawned a fourth some five months after its release.

The initial single, "Toca Me", was a success in the UK, where it charted at number 11, and saw mild success in Ireland and the Netherlands.

The album's second single, "Toca's Miracle", was the group's biggest hit to date, being their only number one hit, having topped the UK charts. It was also a top 10 hit in Australia, Denmark, Ireland and Norway.

"Everytime You Need Me" and "You Are Alive", the third and fourth singles from the album, were also successes in the UK, reaching positions 3 and 4 respectively on the UK Singles Chart.

== Track listing ==
No.	Title	Writer(s)	Vocalist	Length
1.	"Toca's Miracle"	Ramon Zenker; Dirk Duderstadt; Marco Duderstadt; Victor Imbres; Rob Davis	Coco	3:51
2.	"Everytime You Need Me"	Zenker; D. Duderstadt; M. Duderstadt; Joern Friese	Maria Rubia	3:32
3.	"Reach Out"	Zenker; D. Duderstadt; M. Duderstadt; Friese	Damae	3:25
4.	"You Are Alive"	Zenker; Friese	Damae	4:44
5.	"Move On"	Zenker; D. Duderstadt; M. Duderstadt; Friese	Damae	4:16
6.	"Do You Really Want to Feel It"	Zenker; Friese	Damae	5:29
7.	"Magic"	Zenker; Friese	Damae (backing vocals: Dee Jacobee)	4:53
8.	"Everybody Knows"	Zenker; D. Duderstadt; M. Duderstadt; Friese	Linda M	6:55
9.	"Take My Hand"	Zenker; D. Duderstadt; M. Duderstadt; Damae	Damae	5:05
10.	"Outlast"	D. Duderstadt; M. Duderstadt	―	5:09
11.	"Toca Me"	Zenker; D. Duderstadt; M. Duderstadt	—	3:34

- Some editions of the album also include an enhanced section containing the videos for Fragma's first three singles:
1. "Toca Me" (video)
2. "Toca's Miracle" (video)
3. "Everytime You Need Me" (video)

== Charts ==
=== Weekly charts ===
Chart (2001)	Peak position
Australian Albums (ARIA)	81
Danish Albums (Hitlisten)	39
Finnish Albums (Suomen virallinen lista)	21
German Albums (Offizielle Top 100)	53
Norwegian Albums (VG-lista)	15
Swedish Albums (Sverigetopplistan)	54
UK Albums (OCC)	19

=== Year-end charts ===
Chart (2001)	Position
UK Albums (OCC)	178

== Certifications ==
Region	Certification	Certified units/sales
United Kingdom (BPI)	Gold	100,000^{^}
^{^} Shipments figures based on certification alone.
