= Galleon (disambiguation) =

A galleon was a large, multi-decked sailing ship used as armed cargo carriers primarily by European states during the age of sail.

Galleon may also refer to:

- Galleon (video game), a 2004 action-adventure game
- Galleon (band), a French dance music band
  - Galleon (album)
- Manila galleons, the 17th to 19th century trade route between Manila in the Philippines and Acapulco in present-day Mexico
- Galleon Group, a hedge fund
- Gloomy Galleon, the fourth level in Donkey Kong 64
- The galleon, a fictional gold coin in the fictional universe of Harry Potter

== See also ==
- Galeon (disambiguation)
