= Spente le Stelle (Opera Trance) – The Remixes – Part One =

Spente le Stelle: Opera Trance & Emma Shapplin The Remixes Part One

Remix album by Emma Shapplin, Chiara Zeffirelli
- Released: December 12, 2000
- Genre: Pop, Electronica
- Label: Radikal Records

Spente le Stelle: Opera Trance & Emma Shapplin The Remixes Part One is a mini remix album released by Radikal Records. The album features songs from Emma Shapplin of Opera Trance: Spente le Stelle and Cuor Senza Sangue. Both songs are from Shapplin's debut album, Carmine Meo. The Cuor Senza Sangue remix is sung by Chiara Zeffirelli, who featured as the leading soprano of Atylantos.

1. Spente le Stelle [Yomanda Radio Edit] - Emma Shapplin
2. Spente le Stelle [Yomanda Remix] - Emma Shapplin
3. Cuor Senza Sangue [Odji de C. Mix] - Chiara Zeffirelli
4. Spente le Stelle [Yomanda Dub] - Emma Shapplin
5. Cuor Senza Sangue [Odji de C. Instrumental] - Chiara Zeffirelli

The Spanish version of Cuor Senza Sangue remix (Cuerpo sin Alma), performed by Emma Shapplin, is found in her single Discovering Yourself.

== Critical reception ==
The album was a crossover radio hit, but did not reach the Top 20 of the Billboard Hot Dance Club Play chart.
