= Coco Star =

English singer and songwriter

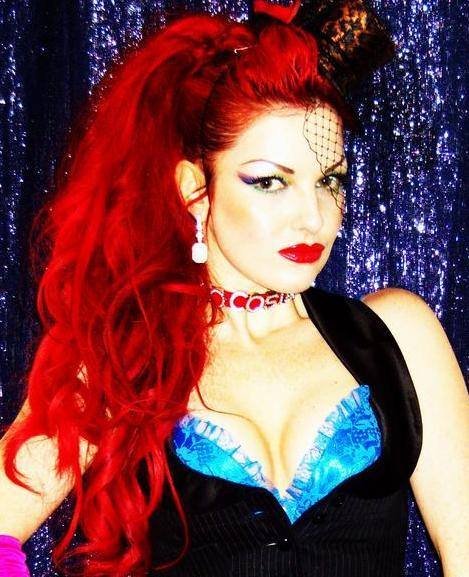
- Coco Star – Electric Zoo Festival 2010

Background information
- Also known as: CoCo
- Born: Susan Brice; 16 March 1971 (age 55); Welwyn Garden City, Hertfordshire, England
- Origin: Bristol
- Genres: Electronic dance music, UK garage, gospel, dubstep, drum and bass
- Occupations: Singer, songwriter
- Instrument: Vocals
- Years active: 1992–present
- Labels: Universal, Positiva
- Website: www.facebook.com/cocostar.uk

Susan Brice (born 16 March 1971), better known by her stage name Coco Star (or simply Coco), is an English singer and songwriter, who was signed to Universal Music and EMI. Brice has collaborated with artists such as Craig David, Artful Dodger.

== Early life ==
Brice was born in Welwyn Garden City, Hertfordshire. Her parents were both musical artists and singers although not professionally. She was musically active before the age of just 5 with hopes of having a number one hit record, which she later achieved. Brice can play the cello and all of the recorder family, and some piano.

At the age of just 12, Brice was writing and performing her own songs and had recorded her first track at the age of 15.

Brice attended the University of the West of England, Bristol where she achieved a BA Hons degree in fashion and textiles. Prior to this, she had completed an art foundation course and a national diploma in art and design.

== Musical career ==
During her time at university, she met up with Jody Wisternoff, Massive Attack and Tricky and began to further enhance her live performances and songwriting skills, landing underground hits with "One By One" and "Always on my Mind".

In 1994, Brice was signed by Universal MCA music publishing as part of a development deal where she worked alongside Paul Connolly on live showcases. Brice was coached by Whitney Houston's vocal coach and had dance tuition at Pineapple Dance Studios, as well as meeting Rob Davis regularly to work on music he wrote, and "I Need a Miracle" was just one of a few projects Brice worked on between 1994 and 1997. The ad libitum parts and sections of the melody line in "I Need a Miracle" including harmonies are exclusively the creation of Brice, who gave the song its iconic stamp. Brice also spent some time working with Roger McKenzie (AKA Wildchild) who died in 1995 aged 24.

By 1997, Brice had entered the main UK charts with "I Need a Miracle" at No. 39 following its debut live performance at Pacha, Ibiza. It later went on to be the feature of a bootleg by UK DJ Vimto with huge success. Originally called "Fragma vs Coco", the mashup of the two records "Toca Me" by Fragma, and "I Need a Miracle" by Coco resulted in the name "Toca's Miracle". By the time of its official release in April 2000, the energy surrounding it was such that it went straight in at No. 1 in the UK, selling in excess of 500,000 copies.

Brice is an accomplished songwriter, also signed to Universal Music Publishing for her works, including "It Ain't Enough" which features on the Artful Dodger album It's All About the Stragglers; this version also featuring Brice's vocals. "It Ain't Enough" was a top 20 hit for the Artful Dodger in 2001 but featured vocalist MZ MAY.

Brice also wrote the track "Driftaway", which was covered by Kele Le Roc.

Brice worked on an EP of songs by songwriter/producer Peter Wright. "Take You There" was released in April 2011.

She has also signed a deal with DJ Smash, for a release of her self penned "Get Over You". This collaboration was part of the 2011 DJ Smash album, 23, and featured production by another Russian, DJ She.

Ahead of the 2011 Winter Music Conference in Miami, Brice featured at No. 12 in the official buzz chart with a re-vocal of "I Need a Miracle", in a fresh new collaborative work with MYNC and Australian house music star Christian Luke. As with "Toca's Miracle", the new release entitled "A Miracle in Melbourne" is a mashup of the iconic vocal from "I Need a Miracle" and the track "London to Melbourne" released in late 2010 by MYNC and Christian Luke on CR2 Records, London.

== Collaborations ==
Brice has collaborated with artists including Sub Love (Way out West) in 1993 (both writing and performing with DJ Die & Jody Wisternoff), Tricky, Massive Attack, Victor Imbres (Deep Dish engineer), Rob Davis from 1994–'97 (Kylie Minogue's songwriter), Craig David and the Dreem Teem (Timmi Magic and DJ Spoony), Artful Dodger, Brian Harvey (East 17), Fragma (on the remix of "I Need a Miracle" 2000 & 2008) and Photek under his moniker of 'Sentinel'. In 2011, Brice teamed up with MYNC and Christian Luke for collaborative works involving "I Need a Miracle".

Brice is also associated with Andy Levy and Simon Bartholomew of the Brand New Heavies with whom she collaborated during the production of some of her self written music.

== "I Need a Miracle" and "Toca's Miracle" ==
"Toca's Miracle"

Single by Fragma and Coco

from the album Toca
- Released: 10 April 2000 ("Toca's Miracle"); 7 April 2008 ("Toca's Miracle 2008")
- Recorded: 1999
- Genre: Euro house
- Length: 5:44 (Original Mix); 5:38 (Vocal Club Mix); 3:22 (Radio Edit); 3:01 (U.S. Radio Edit)
- Label: Positiva
- Songwriters: Dirk Duderstadt, Marco Duderstadt, Ramon Zenker, Rob Davis, Victor Imbres
- Producer: Ramon Zenker

Fragma and Coco singles chronology
"I Need a Miracle" (1997)	"Toca's Miracle" (2000)	"It Ain't Enough" (2001)

Her most notable work to date is as the vocalist of "I Need a Miracle", released by EMI/Positiva in the UK and by Greenlight Recordings in the US. This track is also known worldwide under the guise of the mashup "Toca's Miracle" which was a number 1 hit in 14 countries worldwide in 2000. "Toca's Miracle" is the result of splicing tracks (see mashup (music)) from two separate entities, namely Fragma (the German-based electronic production trio) and their hit "Toca Me", and "I Need a Miracle" which was initially written for solo artist Coco, by Universal Music publishing writers Victor Imbres and Rob Davis in 1994. Despite appearances in the "Toca's Miracle" video and Fragma album line-up, Brice was never part of the Fragma group, and remains a solo artist. Rebranding of the original song "I Need a Miracle" to Fragma's "Toca's Miracle" occurred without permission or prior agreement.

Brice appeared live on Top of the Pops on four occasions, including the Christmas special during 2000 and 2001 to perform "Toca's Miracle" as well as on CD:UK, T4 and the Pepsi Chart Show. Further live performances of "Toca's Miracle" and Brice's other works were given on MTV and The Prince's Trust's Party in the Park.

=== "Toca's Miracle 2008" ===
Brice's vocals can also be heard on the 2008 remix of "Toca's Miracle", remixed by brothers Marko and Dirk Duderstadt. Again it uses the vocal parts from Brice's signed release of "I Need a Miracle". The 2008 remix was released by EMI/Positiva on 7 April 2008. Although the original 2000 release topped the charts in several countries exactly eight years previously, the remix climbed to No. 2 in Australia and No. 16 in the UK. The original is acknowledged as one of the top 5 biggest dance anthems ever. Remixes of Toca's Miracle were released without authorisation of Brice or Universal Music in 2008 and 2012.

Both poor credit and lip-synching issues were discussed by press in Central Europe in 2010 when official singer Coco Star announced on National TV that a passing off act was appearing worldwide claiming to be the singer of the hit, either lip-synching or performing live over Brice's copyright-protected vocals, a scenario compared with the Milli Vanilli scandal, although it relates to only one song "Toca's Miracle", effectively a remix of "I Need a Miracle" written for Brice in 1994. The offending passing off artist appears on the cover of the Australian release of "Toca's Miracle 2008" adding to further confusion.
