= I Need a Miracle =

I Need a Miracle may refer to:

- "I Need a Miracle" (Grateful Dead song), from the album Shakedown Street, 1978
- "I Need a Miracle" (Coco Star song), 1996, covered by Tara McDonald in 2016
  - "Toca's Miracle", a song combining the above vocals with the instrumental of Fragma's song "Toca Me"
- "I Need a Miracle" (Third Day song), 2012
- "(I Need a) Miracle", alternate title of the song "Miracle" by Cascada, 2004
- "I Need a Miracle", a song by Larry Boone from One Way to Go, 1991
- "I Need a Miracle", a song by Plus One from Left Behind: The Movie Soundtrack, 2000
