= Sun Factory 3 =

Sun Factory

Compilation album by MC Mario
- Released: June 4, 2002
- Genre: Electronic music
- Length: 73:41
- Label: Sony Music

MC Mario chronology
Classic Rewind (2002)	Sun Factory (2002)	Mixdown 2002 (2002)

Sun Factory 3 is the third album in the Sun Factory series. The album was released on June 4, 2002.

== Track listing ==
No.	Title	Writer(s)	Length
1.	"Heaven" (featuring DJ Sammy, Yanou, Do)	Jim Vallance	3:50
2.	"ResuRection" (featuring PPK)	Alexander Polyakov	4:05
3.	"Something" (featuring Lasgo)	Peter Luts; Dave McCullen	3:50
4.	"Point of View" (featuring DB Boulevard)	Laurent Brancowitz; Thomas Mars	4:56
5.	"I See Right Through to You" (featuring DJ Encore and Engelina)	Engelina Andrina Larsen; Andreas Bang Hemmeth; Michael Parsberg	3:18
6.	"Crying at the Discoteque" (featuring Alcazar)	Alexander Bard; Bernard Edwards; Anders Hansson; Anders Wollbeck	4:11
7.	"You Can't Change Me"	N'Dea Davenport; Armand Van Helden	4:34
8.	"La vita è" (featuring Nek)	Filippo Neviani	4:45
9.	"Addicted to Bass" (featuring Puretone)	Amiel Daemion	4:29
10.	"I Believe" (featuring Galleon)	Philippe Laurent	3:56
11.	"Freak the Funk" (featuring Stezo)	Steve Williams	3:36
12.	"Supersonic"	Micky Denne	4:05
13.	"Another Brick in the Wall" (featuring Hot Coffee/Pink Coffee)	Roger Waters	3:01
14.	"One More Time" (featuring Daft Punk)	Thomas Bangalter; Guy-Manuel de Homem-Christo	4:41
15.	"Magalenha"		4:11
16.	"Suavamente"	Elvis Crespo	4:22
17.	"Hey Baby"	DJ Ötzi	3:30
18.	"Waiting for Tonight"	Jennifer Lopez	4:21

== Charts ==
=== Weekly charts ===
Weekly chart performance for Sun Factory 3
Chart (2002)	Peak position
Canadian Albums (Billboard)	10

=== Year-end charts ===
Year-end chart performance for Sticks and Stones by New Found Glory
Chart (2002)	Position
Canadian Albums (Nielsen SoundScan)	161
