= Galeon (disambiguation) =

Galeon may refer to:

- Galeon, a web browser
- Galeon (molecule), a cyclic diarylheptanoid
- William Galeon (died 1507), a learned English Augustinian

== See also ==
- Galleon (disambiguation)
