= Discovering Yourself =

EP by Emma Shapplin
- Released: 1999
- Genre: classical crossover
- Label: Coeur De Lion/EMI France

Discovering Yourself is an EP from French soprano Emma Shapplin. The songs on the EP were later included on re-issues of Shapplin's album Carmine Meo.

== Track listing ==
1. Discovering Yourself
2. Cuerpo Sin Alma [Remix]
3. Fera Ventura
4. Dolce Veneno
