= Emma Shapplin =

French soprano

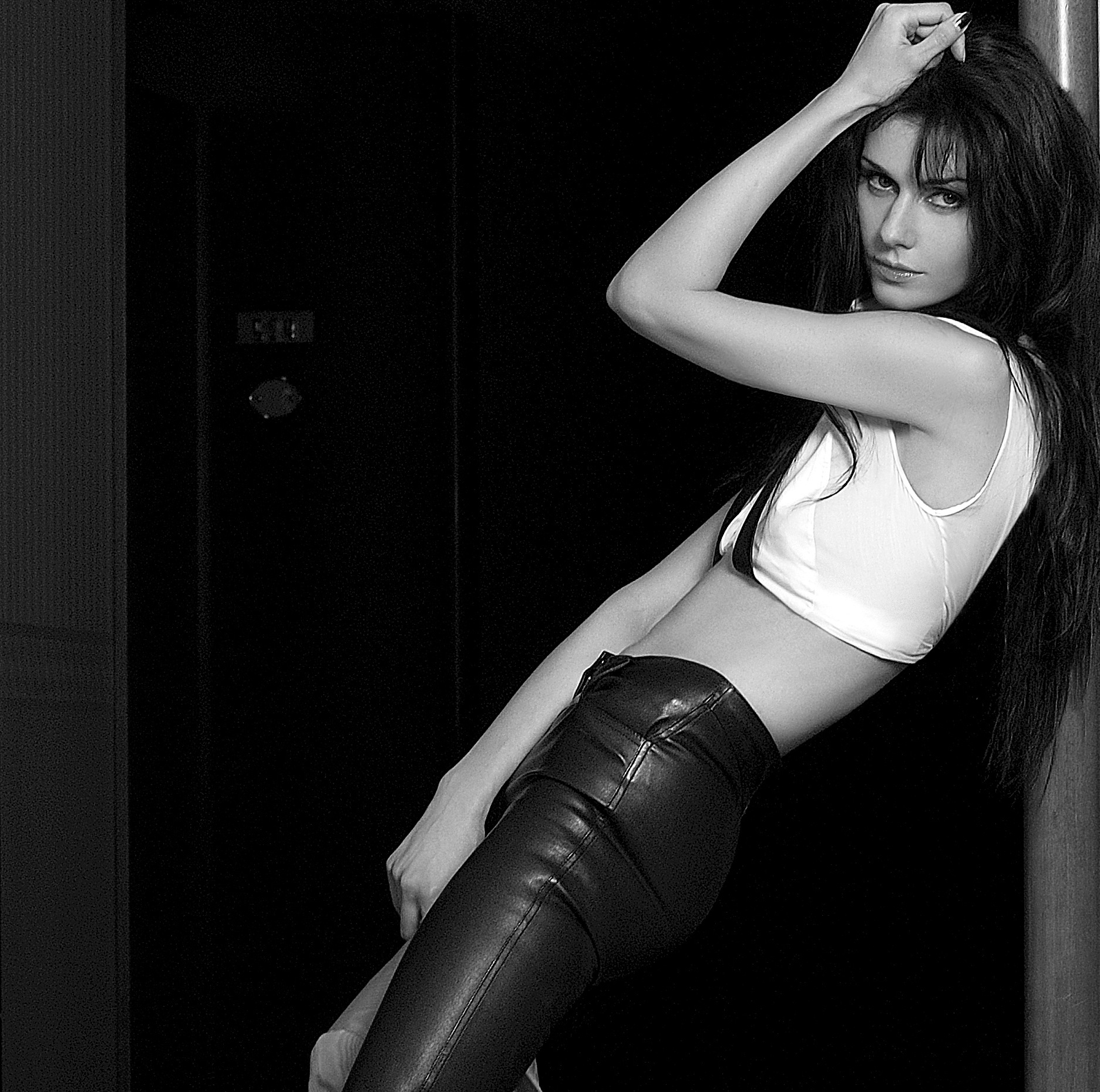
- Shapplin, 2011

Background information
- Born: Crystêle Madeleine Joliton; 19 May 1974 (age 52)
- Origin: Savigny-le-Temple, France
- Genres: Neoclassical; electronic; operatic pop
- Occupations: Singer; composer; visual artist
- Instrument: Vocals
- Years active: 1997–present
- Label: Nimue Music
- Website: emmashapplin-official.com

Emma Shapplin (born Crystêle Madeleine Joliton, 19 May 1974) is a French soprano singer, composer and visual artist known for her fusion of operatic singing with electronic and pop music influences. She debuted in 1997 with the album Carmine Meo, which achieved multi‑platinum status and sold over two million copies worldwide.

== Biography ==
Emma Shapplin was born Crystêle Madeleine Joliton on 19 May 1974, in the Paris suburb of Savigny-le-Temple)

== Vocal career ==
When she was 18, singer Jean-Patrick Capdevielle convinced her to return to taking classical lessons so as to improve her singing technique. She discovered that although rock had given her more artistic freedom and hedonistic lifestyle than classical music, it was still not enough for her, so she decided to create her own style. This became a combination of early opera, modern trance and pop music. Shapplin and Capdevielle subsequently worked together on her first release, Carmine Meo, written by Capdevielle.

== Discography ==
=== Albums ===
- Carmine Meo (1997, Pendragon Records/EMI)
- Etterna (2002, Ark 21 Records/Universal Music Group)
- Macadam Flower (2009, Nimue Music/Universal Music Group/Sony Music)
- Dust of a Dandy (2014)
- Venere (2019)

=== Other releases ===
- Discovering Yourself (EP, 1999, Coeur de lion)
- Spente le Stelle (Opera Trance) – The Remixes – Part One (remix album, 2000, Radikal Records)
- The Concert in Caesarea (live DVD/CD, 2003, Pendragon Records/EMI)
- The Macadam Flower Tour – live concert in Athens DVD (June 2011)
