= So I Begin =

Single by Galleon

from the album Galleon
- Released: June 2001
- Recorded: 2001
- Genre: house, nu-disco
- Length: 3:57
- Label: Radikal Records
- Songwriter(s): Michel Fages, Gilles Fahy & Philippe Laurent
- Producer(s): Galleon

Galleon singles chronology
"So I Begin" (2001)	"I Believe" (2001)

"So I Begin" is a song by French house group Galleon. It was released in June 2001 as the lead single from their album Galleon. The song was a hit in the US on radio and in clubs in 2001. It also reached the top 10 in France and in the Flanders region of Belgium.

== Music video ==
The accompanying music video features top model Jitka Ogureková.

== Formats and track listings ==
CD single - Europe (2001)

1. "So I Begin" (Radio Edit) - 3:57
2. "So I Begin" (Solaris Club Mix) - 8:00
3. "So I Begin" (Mandy's Massage Remix) - 7:15
4. "So I Begin" (Extended Mix) - 6:12
5. "So I Begin" (Classic Club Mix) - 7:35
6. "So I Begin" (Hot Uncensored Video) - 4:00

== Chart performance ==
=== Weekly charts ===
Chart (2001–02)	Peak position
Austria (Ö3 Austria Top 40)	40
Belgium (Ultratip Bubbling Under Flanders)	10
Belgium (Ultratop 50 Wallonia)	23
Canada (Nielsen SoundScan)	38
France (SNEP)	8
Germany (GfK)	37
Italy (FIMI)	48
Netherlands (Dutch Top 40)	13
Netherlands (Single Top 100)	30
Scotland (OCC)	37
Switzerland (Schweizer Hitparade)	17
UK Singles (OCC)	36

=== Year-end charts ===
Chart (2002)	Position
Switzerland (Schweizer Hitparade)	96

== Certifications and sales ==
Region	Certification	Certified units/sales
France (SNEP)	Silver	280,000
