= One Sign =

Single by Galleon

from the album Galleon
- Released: 24 June 2002
- Recorded: 2001
- Length: 3:38
- Label: Radikal Records
- Songwriter(s): Gilles Fahy, Philippe Laurent

Galleon singles chronology
"I Believe" (2001)	"One Sign" (2002)	"The Way" (2002)

One Sign is a song recorded by French house group Galleon. It was released in June 2002 as the third single off their self-titled debut album. A music video was shot to promote the single.

== Formats and track listings ==
These are the formats and track listings of promotional single releases of "One Sign".

CD single

1. "One Sign" Radio Edit - 3:38
2. "One Sign" M.A.N.D.Y. Club Mix - 6:03
3. "One Sign" M.A.N.D.Y. Dub Mix - 5:46
4. "One Sign" Extended Version - 5:32

== Chart performance ==
Chart (2002)	Peak position
Belgium (Ultratop 50 Wallonia)	10
France (SNEP)	68
Germany (GfK)	93
Romania (Romanian Top 100)	23
Switzerland (Schweizer Hitparade)	61
