= The Concert in Caesarea =

Le Concert de Caesaria

Live album by Emma Shapplin
- Released: September 30, 2003
- Genre: Pop, Classical crossover
- Label: EMI France
- Producer: Jean-Patrick Capdevielle

Le Concert de Caesarea is the first live album and DVD by singer Emma Shapplin. It is a recording of Shapplin's first concert in Israel, a concert held in the ancient city of Caesarea in 1999. The album was written, composed and produced by Jean-Patrick Capdevielle. Despite being presented as a live concert, the artist's voice during the show comes from the audio tracks used on her studio album, Carmine Meo.

== Track listing ==
1. Vedi, Maria...
2. Ira di Dio
3. Spente le stelle
4. Miserere, Venere...
5. Cuor senza sangue
6. Lucifero, quel giorno
7. Spente le stelle
8. Alleluia
9. Dolce veneno
10. Fera ventura
11. Discovering Yourself

== DVD setlist ==
1. Vedi, Maria...
2. Ira di Dio
3. Spente le stelle
4. Miserere, Venere...
5. Cuor senza sangue
6. Lucifero, quel giorno
7. Spente le stelle
8. Alleluia
9. Spente le stelle (videoclip)
10. Cuor senza sangue (videoclip)
11. Discovering Yourself (videoclip)
