= I Believe (Galleon song) =

Single by Galleon

from the album Galleon
- Released: November 2001
- Recorded: 2001
- Length: 3:57
- Label: Radikal Records
- Songwriter(s): Philippe Laurent, Gilles Guy Hugues Fahy

Galleon singles chronology
"So I Begin" (2001)	"I Believe" (2001)	"One Sign" (2002)

"I Believe" is a song by French house group Galleon. It was released in November 2001 as the second single from their self-titled debut album. It sampled Europe's 1987 hit "Cherokee" in the beginning. "I Believe" was a moderate hit comparing to their debut single "So I Begin". The music video was shot to promote the single.

== Formats and track listings ==
These are the formats and track listings of promotional single releases of "I Believe".

CD single

1. "I Believe" Radio Edit - 3:57
2. "I Believe" Extended Mix - 5:50
3. "I Believe" Instrumental - 3:57

== Chart performance ==
Chart (2001)	Peak position
Belgium (Ultratop 50 Flanders)	17
Belgium (Ultratop 50 Wallonia)	3
French (SNEP)	43
Switzerland (Schweizer Hitparade)	20
