= Macadam Flower =

Studio album by Emma Shapplin
- Released: November 23, 2009
- Genre: Pop; electronic rock
- Length: 0:39:28
- Label: Nimue Music & Publishing

Emma Shapplin chronology
Etterna (2002)	Macadam Flower (2009)

Macadam Flower is the third album from French soprano Emma Shapplin. It is more pop-oriented than her previous work and is mainly performed in English.

== Track listing ==
No.	Title	Length
1.	"Nothing Wrong"	3:06
2.	"The Hours on the Fields"	4:49
3.	"L'Absolu"	5:15
4.	"Reptile"	3:24
5.	"Number 5"	0:33
6.	"White Sail"	3:39
7.	"My Soul"	3:57
8.	"Sur l'Eau"	3:33
9.	"Number 9"	0:32
10.	"La Promenade de San"	3:34
11.	"Jealously Yours"	3:25
12.	"Aedeus Variations"	3:32

== Charts ==
Chart (2009)	Peak position
Greek Albums Chart	4
Argentinian Albums Chart	7
Mexico Albums Chart	79

== Release history ==
Region	Date	Label	Format	Catalogue
Greece	23 November 2009	Universal Records Greece	CD	
Russia (and CIS)	29 November 2009	Sony Music Entertainment	CD, LP	
Latin America	8 December 2009	Sony Music Entertainment	CD	
UK	29 December 2009	Phantom Sound & Vision	CD	
Turkey	7 January 2010	Sony Music Entertainment	CD	
Worldwide	15 April 2011	Nimue Music	Digital Download	

== Macadam Flower Tour ==
The Macadam Flower Tour was recorded and released as The Macadam Flower Tour – live concert in Athens DVD.

Date	City	Country	Venue
North America
November 5, 2009	Haifa	Israel	International Convention Centre
November 7, 2009	Tel Aviv	Israel	Yad Eliyahu Arena
January 30, 2010	Xanthi	Greece	Athletics Centre
March 6, 2010	Athens	Greece	Megaron Moussikis
March 7, 2010	Athens	Greece	Megaron Moussikis
May 2, 2010	St. Petersburg	Russia	St. Petersburg Film Festival
June 11, 2010	Istanbul	Turkey	Turkcell Kuruçeşme Arena
September 13, 2010	Thessaloniki	Greece	Theatre Gis
September 14, 2010	Mount Lycabettus	Greece	Lycabettus Theatre
October 1, 2010	Chihuahua	Mexico	UACH Stadium
July 1, 2011	Potsdam	Germany	Potsdamer Stadtwerke Festival
September 14, 2011	Medellín	Colombia	National University of Colombia at Medellín
September 16, 2011	Bogotá	Colombia	Colsubsidio Theatre
September 17, 2011	Bogotá	Colombia	Colsubsidio Theatre
November 3, 2011	Yekaterinburg	Russia	KKT Kosmos
November 5, 2011	St. Petersburg	Russia	Oktyabrskiy Big Concert Hall
November 6, 2011	Moscow	Russia	Crocus City Hall
November 8, 2011	Kyiv	Ukraine	Palace "Ukraine"
