= E-Trax =

- Origin: Germany
- Genres: house, techno
- Years active: 1991–2005
- Labels: Tidy Trax
- Past members: Jens Lissat; Ramon Zenker

E-Trax is a duo consisting of Jens Lissat and Ramon Zenker. Their hard house release on the Tidy Trax label, "Let's Rock", made #60 on the UK Singles Chart in 2001. The track was also known as the anthem of the Trade nightclub, and was cited by DJ Tony de Vit as one of his top 10 tunes. In a retrospective guide to hard house in 2015, Vice magazine stated the "Let's Rock" single was "eternal", "sophisticated", and would fit into contemporary DJ sets. E-Trax were featured on the retrospective best-of Reactivate ’91 – ‘01 compilation released in 2015.
