= Jean-Patrick Capdevielle =

French musician and painter (born 1945)

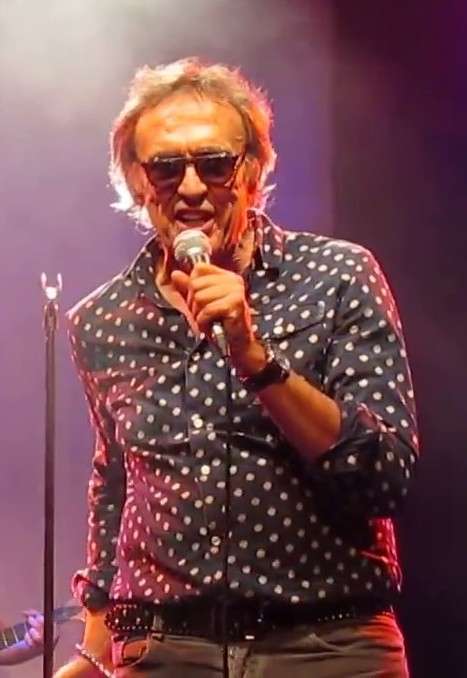
- Jean-Patrick Capdevielle in November 2016

Background information
- Born: December 19, 1945 (age 80); Levallois-Perret
- Genres: Rock Music; Abstract painting
- Occupations: Songwriter; Composer; Singer; Musician; Painter
- Website: jpcapdevielle.com

Jean-Patrick Capdevielle (born December 19, 1945) is a French songwriter, composer, singer, musician and painter who influenced the French rock scene in the 1980s.

With a mixture of American and British influences, Capdevielle's work is characterised by his raucous voice. Many of his lyrics are based on anarchist and visionary concepts, with rhythms commonly seen in 1960s London and late 1970s New York club scenes.

== Biography ==
Capdevielle was born on December 19, 1945. in Levallois-Perret, near Paris. He received his high school diploma when he was 15 years old, then went on to study medicine and law.

Following his studies, he worked as a journalist and a photographer for various French magazines including Salut les copains, Mademoiselle Age Tendre, SuperHebdo, Actuel (dedicated to counter-culture), and Lui (or Paris Match. He then went on to become an artistic director and created a teen magazine, which he sold a short time later.

In the 1960s, he traveled to the United States and lived there for two years in a Volkswagen camper van. He also lived in London, where he met The Beatles, The Rolling Stones, Jimi Hendrix, and became a close friend of Eric Clapton.

In 1970, he settled in the Balearic Islands in Ibiza, where he devoted himself to painting and composing music. In 1978, Capdevielle received a gift of an electric guitar from a friend and began to write his first songs. This led to the recording of his first record, "Solitude", which was described as "Reggae in French" and was produced by Ketchup Music (a label owned by French/American artist William Sheller). This first record was moderately successful. When the record label later ceased operations, his initial success allowed him to sign a contract with CBS.

In August 1979, Capdevielle's first album, Les Enfants des Ténèbres et les Anges de la rue, was released. Unexpectedly, the B-side track (Quand t'es dans le Désert) was more successful commercially than the single itself, becoming an anthem among students who participated or sympathized with the May '68 protests. Thirty-five years later, Capdevielle is still remembered for this song in France.

The second album, /2, was released in 1980 and was also highly successful. The tracks C'est dur d'être un héros and Oh Chiquita sold 150,000 and 200,000 copies respectively.

His first two albums were certified platinum albums, with more than 200,000 copies sold of each. They were classed among the "Top 100 Essential French Rock Albums" by Rolling Stone in 2010.

Between 1980 and 1982, Capdevielle completed three concert tours in Paris, two at The Olympia and one at The Palais de Sports.

In 1982, Capdevielle released his third album L'Ennemi Public, recorded at Bearsville Sound Studio (next to Woodstock) with the participation of American musicians such as Wells Kelly (a musical accompanist of Meat Loaf). The lyrics of the first song, Tu es pas fait pour ça, directly denounce the influence of the media ("They judge you in the name of the laws they invent / For them you are always on the dirty slope / You have to leave your carousel / If nobody protects you / They weigh your rage by the weight of their schemes / It seems you must sell everything in a window / You have to know how to crawl on the ground / To become a real pop singer.")

In 1983, a live album Dernier rappel was released. Capdevielle surprised his fans as this new release was very different musically to his previous records. For example, with Mauvaise fréquentations in 1984, Capdevielle provides a series of very personal, dark and minimalist songs. Some of these songs were negatively received by critics.

Capdevielle returned in 1988, with Nouvel âge, which remains one of his lesser-known albums. This album also featured personal reflection and dark inferences. The album Vue sur cour was released in 1990, and also went relatively unnoticed. In 1992, Capdevielle explored blues-rock with the album Vertigo, which was recorded in Nashville (this record is also largely unknown).

Besides his musical career, Capdevielle achieved other artistic pursuits of various forms; he hosted a TV Show, Les Totems du Bataclan between 1985 and 1986; and in 1986, he acted in a telefilm L'Enigme des Sables directed by Philippe Valois.

He also co-founded a production company with Paco Rabanne, Cadrages, which produced the feature film, directed by Mira Nair, Salaam Bombay that won the Caméra d’Or at the 41st Cannes Film Festival in 1988.

He also authored Linda William's musical success Traces released in 1988 and, the same year, participated to the charitable French song "Liban" with other French artists.

In 1993, he moved to the United States, where he studied cinematic techniques at UCLA in California. When he returned in 1995, he directed several video clips, including "Si tu te bats (If you fight)" (Renaud Hantson) and another one for Richard Cocciante.

In 1995, he also released the album Politiquement correct (a compilation signed on the Sony Music label, with four new titles).

In 1997, reconnecting with his old passion for classical music, he wrote, composed and directed Carmine Meo for the soprano Emma Shapplin, an album of contemporary opera, sung in 14th century Italian. The CD and the subsequent tour were an international success and the CD sold more than two and the half million copies; obtaining 39 Gold records and 17 Platinum records.

In 2001, Capdevielle wrote and composed a neo-romantic opera, still in the 14th century Italian : Atylantos… A legend of Atlantis, with Chiara Zeffirelli, Elena Cojocaru, Jade Laura Angelis and Nikola Todorovitch. The final goal still remains to produce a show based on this album.

In 2005, he co-produced the album Pop Tasty, which was written and composed by Montparnasse band.

In 2007, he wrote lyrics for several songs on David Hallyday's album released that year. His 13th album Heretique #13 was released that same year.

In 2008, Capdevielle supported Sweet Air in taking part in the Baltimore project in support of the hostages of the world.

In 2015, after 6 years of writing and composition, he decided to write 11 songs. The first drafts of these songs were released on social media and Capdevielle decided to launch a campaign on the crowdfunding platform KissKissBankBank. Within a few hours, the budget needed to achieve the album recording was reached and even exceeded. The album Bienvenue au Paradis (Capdevielle 14th) was recorded in "Britannia Row studios" in London and in Paris, and the Premium Version Album was released in November 2015 on his official website.

Following the release of this album, the "Welcome to Paradise" Tour, a participation tour was organised by his fans in French-speaking countries for a year.

He recorded a live album during this tour, which was released in 2017.

== Discography ==
| Year | Title | Label |
|---|---|---|
| 1978 | Solitude (45 Single) | Ketchup Music |
| 1979 | Les Enfants des ténèbres et les Anges de la rue | CBS |
| 1980 | /2 | CBS |
| 1981 | Le Long de la jetée | CBS |
| 1982 | L'Ennemi public | CBS |
| 1983 | Dernier Rappel (Live) | CBS |
| 1984 | Mauvaises Fréquentations | CBS |
| 1985 | Planète X | CBS |
| 1986 | "D'où viennent les danseuses" (45 Single) | CBS |
| 1987 | Nouvel Âge | WEA |
| 1990 | Vue sur cour | WEA |
| 1992 | Vertigo | Virgin France |
| 1995 | Politiquement correct (compilation) | TriStar |
| 2001 | Atylantos-Une Légende de l'Atlantide | Philips |
| 2007 | Hérétique #13 | O+ |
| 2015 | Bienvenue au Paradis | |
