= You Are Alive =

2001 single by Fragma

Single by Fragma

from the album Toca
- Released: 7 May 2001
- Length: 3:36
- Label: Orbit
- Songwriters: Ramon Zenker; Joern Friese
- Producer: Ramon Zenker

Fragma singles chronology
"Everytime You Need Me" (2001)	"You Are Alive" (2001)	"Say That You're Here" (2001)

Music video
- "You Are Alive" on YouTube

"You Are Alive" is a song by German trance music group Fragma featuring vocals from German singer-songwriter Damae. It was released on 7 May 2001 as the fourth and final single from their debut album, Toca. The single peaked at number four on the UK Singles Chart in May 2001 and charted within the top 20 in Austria, Denmark, Ireland, Norway, Romania, and Spain. In the United States, the song reached number 17 on the Billboard Dance Club Play chart.

== Track listings ==
German CD single

1. "You Are Alive" (radio edit) – 3:36
2. "You Are Alive" (Blank & Jones remix) – 7:56
3. "You Are Alive" (extended version) – 6:00
4. "You Are Alive" (Warp Brothers remix) – 7:23
5. "You Are Alive" (Praha remix) – 8:15
6. "You Are Alive" (dub version) – 5:15

UK CD1

1. "You Are Alive" (radio edit) – 3:36
2. "You Are Alive" (extended version) – 6:00
3. "Toca Megamix" – 8:07
4. "You Are Alive" (enhanced video)

UK CD2

1. "You Are Alive" (radio edit) – 3:36
2. "You Are Alive" (Warp Brothers remix) – 7:23
3. "You Are Alive" (Blank & Jones remix) – 7:56

US 12-inch single

A1. "You Are Alive" (extended version) – 6:00
A2. "You Are Alive" (Warp Brothers remix) – 7:23
B1. "You Are Alive" (Blank & Jones remix) – 7:56
B2. "You Are Alive" (dub version) – 5:15

Australian CD single

1. "You Are Alive" (radio edit) – 3:36
2. "You Are Alive" (Warp Brothers remix) – 7:23
3. "You Are Alive" (extended version) – 6:00
4. "You Are Alive" (Blank & Jones remix) – 7:56
5. "You Are Alive" (Praha remix) – 8:15
6. "You Are Alive" (dub version) – 5:15

== Charts ==
=== Weekly charts ===
Chart (2001)	Peak position
Australia (ARIA)	37
Austria (Ö3 Austria Top 40)	13
Denmark (Tracklisten)	16
Europe (Eurochart Hot 100)	25
Germany (GfK)	23
Ireland (IRMA)	20
Ireland Dance (IRMA)	1
Norway (VG-lista)	13
Romania (Romanian Top 100)	2
Scotland Singles (OCC)	2
Spain (PROMUSICAE)	18
Sweden (Sverigetopplistan)	45
Switzerland (Schweizer Hitparade)	67
UK Singles (OCC)	4
US Dance Club Play (Billboard)	17

=== Year-end charts ===
Chart (2001)	Position
Romania (Romanian Top 100)	36
UK Singles (OCC)	105

== Release history ==
Region	Date	Format(s)	Label(s)	Ref.
United Kingdom	7 May 2001	12-inch vinyl; CD; cassette	Positiva	
Australia	28 May 2001	CD	X-Over	
