= Etterna =

Studio album by Emma Shapplin
- Released: 22 September 2002
- Genres: Classical crossover; neoclassical
- Label: Universal Music Group
- Producer: Graeme Revell

Emma Shapplin chronology
Carmine Meo (1997)	Etterna (2002)	Macadam Flower (2009)

Professional ratings
Review scores
Source	Rating
AllMusic	3/5 stars

Etterna is the second album from French soprano Emma Shapplin. The album was produced by film composer Graeme Revell and includes collaborations with the London Symphony Orchestra. It received a gold certification in Greece. All songs written and composed by Emma Shapplin:

== Track listing ==
No.	Title	Length
1.	"Un Sospir' di Voi"
2.	"Aedeus"
3.	"Da Me Non Venni"
4.	"La Notte Etterna"
5.	"Leonora"
6.	"Celtica"
7.	"La Silente Riva"
8.	"Spesso, Sprofondo"
9.	"Mai Più Serena"
10.	"Nell' Aria Bruna"
11.	"Finale"
12.	"La Notte Etterna (Remix)"

=== Bonus DVD ===
No.	Title	Length
13.	"Interview"

== Charts ==
=== Weekly charts ===
Chart (2002)	Peak position
Belgian Albums (Ultratop Wallonia)	13
Dutch Albums (Album Top 100)	8
French Albums (SNEP)	34
Greek Foreign Albums (IFPI)	1
New Zealand Albums (RMNZ)	11
Swiss Albums (Schweizer Hitparade)	88

=== Year-end charts ===
Chart (2002)	Position
Dutch Albums (Album Top 100)	70
