= Damae =

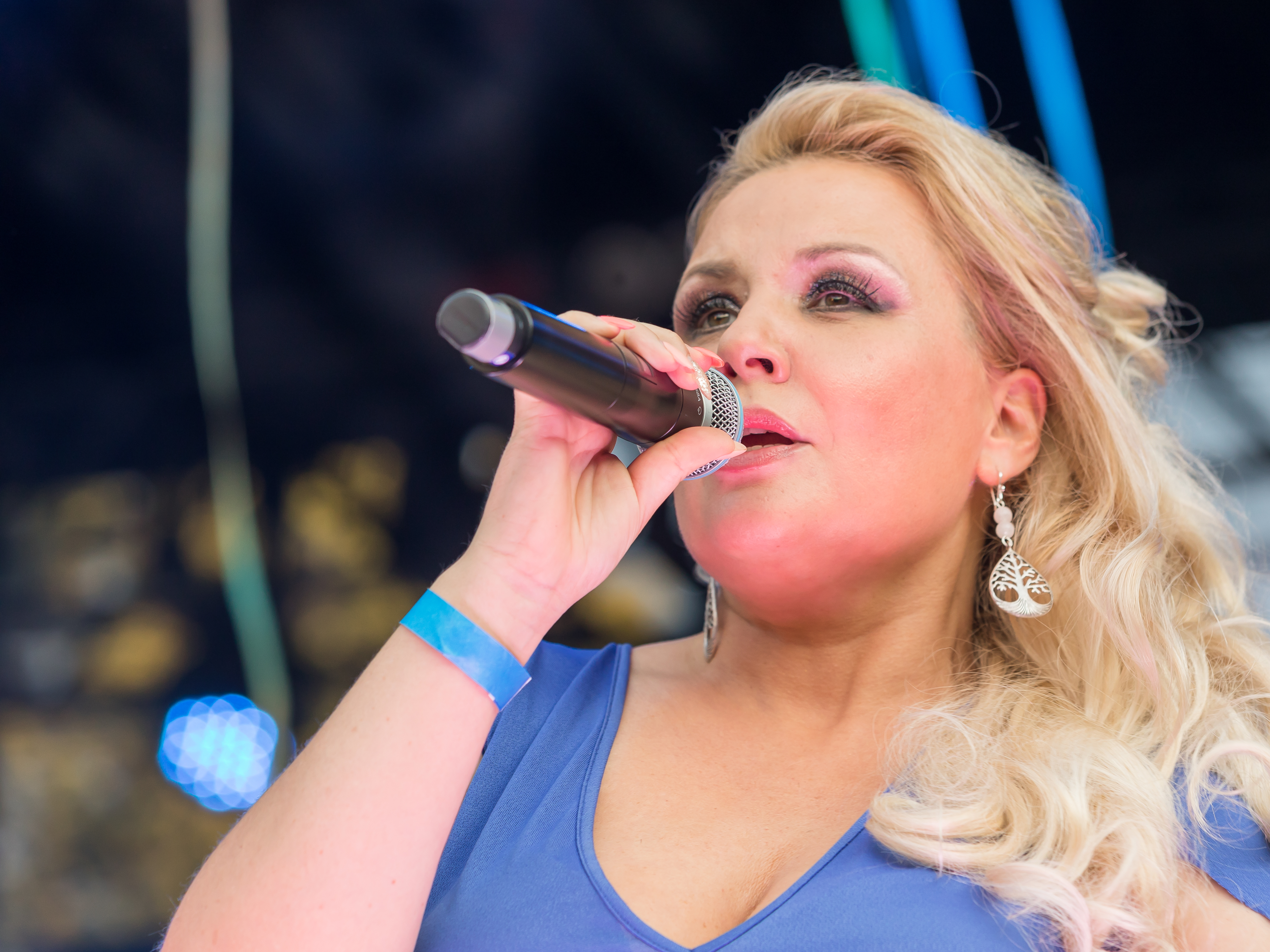
- Damae, 2018

Background information
- Born: Daniela Marina Elisabeth Klein; 10 July 1979 (age 47); Cologne, West Germany
- Years active: 2000 – present
- Formerly of: Fragma

Daniela Marina Elisabeth Klein (born 10 July 1979), known by her stage name Damae, is a German TV presenter and singer-songwriter who debuted as a vocalist on the Fragma track "You Are Alive". At the age of 14, Damae was discovered by a photographer from the teen magazine Bravo in Germany and began modeling. Soon after, she started receiving offers from music and film producers which she declined, preferring to sing and write in a punk band, and to do freelance and studio gigs. She later met Ramon Zenker, who she admired from Hardfloor. He invited her to his studio to see if they could work together. Damae describes the musical chemistry between them as "amazing" and Damae soon found herself with a record deal as the singer for Fragma. Following the success of Fragma, Damae became the presenter for Dance:District on onyx.tv in Germany and got to interview Paul van Dyk, Tiësto, WestBam, Jean Jacques Smoothie, Junior Jack, Boogie Pimps, Milk & Sugar, Mousse T. and many more.

== Early music success ==
=== Debut album with Fragma – Toca ===
The majority of "Toca" was sung by Damae as her position in the group as the lead vocalist had been made permanent after the success of "You Are Alive" (UK No.4). The album was a global success on its release in 2001 and earned a gold disc for its sales in the UK. Fragma were at this time signed to highly prolific UK label Positiva Records.

=== Second album with Fragma – Embrace ===
Damae's position as the lead singer of Fragma was cemented when she was the only lead vocalist to appear on the Fragma's second album Embrace (2002). Due to the success of Fragma's Toca album the band signed to a new label Illustrious in the UK. Damae appeared on all three of the singles from the album, "Say that You're Here" (UK No.21), "Embrace Me" and "Time and Time Again". Damae also appeared on the track "Man on the Moon" which featured on a new version of the album Embrace released a year later in 2003. Due to the success of the singles in club charts across Europe, Damae was in high demand for club appearances.

=== Collaborations and solo work ===
Damae has also collaborated with various artists as a featured singer. Kyau vs Albert feat. Damae, "Velvet Morning" (EastWest/Euphonic), 'Distant Soundz' feat. Damae, "Just Wanna Luv You" (Inferno). Damae co-produced and co-wrote the singles "Control", which was set for release in early 2006. The single is being co-produced and released by Jens Kindervater, former A&R for Alphabet City, who has started a new label, Kick Fresh Recordings.

In early 2008, Damae wrote and sang the vocals for the 4Clubbers track "Try and Try". Further solo singles, "Not Over You" written by Kylie Minogues's UK Top Songwriter Karen Poole and "Never Be Lonely" were recorded at the famous Murlyn Music studios (Madonna, Britney Spears) in Stockholm and were set for release through Ministry of Sound.

Damae also featured on the gold selling album "Sehnsucht"/Desire" by Schiller in 2008 on the track "Lonely". Damae will feature on Darren Bailie's (from Guru Josh Project) new single set for release in early 2010 called "Ocean of Love". February 2010 saw the release of Damae's collaboration with Alex Guesta on the track "Perfect Day". In October 2010 Damae featured on Dj Falk's track "Jaana".

=== Return to Fragma ===
After taking some time away from the Fragma project to concentrate on her solo career, Damae returned to duties as the lead vocalist. The Duderstadt brothers under their alias "Inpetto" remixed the track "Toca's Miracle" to global commercial and club success. Damae toured extensively to promote the single. This was the first time a Fragma single had had a commercial release in the UK since "Say That You're Here". Due to the success of "Toca's Miracle 2008" (UK No.16), Damae recorded two further songs with Fragma, "Deeper" and "Memory". "Memory" was signed to Hard2Beat in the UK after its phenomenal success abroad. Damae then toured extensively again, this time as part of the "Memory" tour. In 2009, Damae took part in Hard2Beat "Dance Nation" tour, the largest tour Fragma has done in the UK. In an interview in May 2009 on the Hard2Beat website, Damae confirmed that she was working on new songs with Fragma. This has led to speculation that a third long-awaited album may be released in the future. On 3 November 2009 Damae shot a video in New York for Fragma's new single 'Forever and a Day'. It is Fragma's first promotional video featuring Damae since 'Man in the Moon' in 2003. The single can be downloaded from 27 November 2009. In 2010, Damae & Jesus shot the video to their track (Jesus Luz feat. Fragma) ‘What Do You Want’ in Brazil, Damae exclusively told Dance Nation that the high-budget video will have a matrix feel to it and that Madonna loves the concept. Damae also features on the 2011 Fragma single "Oops Sorry". In 2011, Fragma re-issued "Everytime You Need Me" with new mixes. In 2011, Fragma did a collaboration with Plastik Funk for the song "What Love Can Do" and with Italian DJs from Mars for "Insane (In Da Brain)". In 2012, Fragma released "Thousand Times" which was a hit in Romania. Also Fragma did another featuring with Akil Wingate for the song "Where Do We Go".

== Background ==
Damae was born in Cologne, Germany to a German father and Romanian mother, originating from Corabia.

== Discography ==
Fragma singles

- "You Are Alive" (2001) (Vocals by Damae) UK No. 4
- "Say That You're Here" (2001) UK No. 21 (Vocals by Damae)
- "Embrace Me" (2002) (Vocals by Damae)
- "Time And Time Again" (2002) (Vocals by Damae)
- "Man in the Moon" (2003) (Vocals by Damae)
- "Born to Love" (2005) (Vocals by Damae)
- "Deeper" (2007) (Vocals by Damae)
- "Memory" (2008) (Vocals by Damae)
- "Forever and a Day" (2009) (Vocals by Damae)
- "What Do You Want" (joint collaboration with Jesus Luz) (2010) (Vocals by Damae)
- "Oops Sorry" (2011) (Vocals by Damae)
- "Everytime You Need Me 2011" (2011) (Vocals by Damae)
- "What Love Can Do" (joint collaboration with Plastik Funk) (2011) (Vocals by Damae)
- "Insane (In Da Brain)" (joint collaboration with Djs from Mars) (2011) (Vocals by Damae)
- "Thousand Times" (2012) (Vocals by Damae)
- "Where Do We Go" feat. Akil Wingate (2012) (Vocals by Damae)

Fragma albums 1) "Toca" (22 January 2001) Gold status in UK
Reach Out (Vocals by Damae)
You Are Alive (Vocals by Damae) No 4 UK
Move On (Vocals by Damae)
Do You Really Want To Feel It
Magic (Vocals by Damae)
Take My Hand (Vocals by Damae) Lyrics by Damae

2) "Embrace" (All Vocals by Damae) (2002)
Time And Time Again (Vocals by Damae)
Embrace Me (Vocals by Damae)
Say That You're Here (Vocals by Damae)
How Do You Feel(Vocals by Damae)
Take This World For Real (Vocals by Damae)
Just Like A Teardrop (Vocals by Damae)
Who Needs a Reason (Vocals by Damae)
Only You (Vocals by Damae)
Why (Vocals by Damae)
Maybe It's You (Vocals by Damae)
Free Your Mind (Vocals by Damae)
Risk My Soul (Vocals by Damae) Lyrics by Damae
Time And Time Again (Megara vs. DJ Lee Remix) (Vocals by Damae)
Embrace Me (Wippenberg Remix)(Vocals by Damae)
Say That You're Here (Riva Remix)(Vocals by Damae)
How Do You Feel (Cyber Trance Remix)(Vocals by Damae)

Fragma remixes Say That You're Here (Riva Mix)(Vocals by Damae)
Video1 Embrace Me – Video (Vocals by Damae)
Video2 Time And Time Again – Video (Vocals by Damae)
Man in the Moon (2003 Club Mix) (Vocals by Damae)
Man in the Moon (Duderstadt Remix) (Vocals by Damae)
Man in the Moon (DJ Kadozer Remix) (Vocals by Damae)
Embrace Me (Duderstadt Remix) (Vocals by Damae)
Embrace Me (Wippenberg Remix) (Vocals by Damae)
Say That You're Here (Extended Version) (Vocals by Damae)
Say That You're Here (Duderstadt Remix) (Vocals by Damae)
Say That You're Here (Riva Remix) (Vocals by Damae)
Time And Time Again (Extended Mix) (Vocals by Damae)
Time And Time Again (Megara vs. DJ Lee Remix) (Vocals by Damae)
Time And Time Again (Duderstadt Remix) (Vocals by Damae)

Damae singles

Kyau vs. Albert* Feat. Damae – " Velvet Morning " (2003)
Distant Soundz feat. Damae – " Just Wanna Luv U " (2003)
Damae Feat. Londonbeat – " I've Been Thinking About You " (2004)
4 Clubbers & Damae " Try And Try " written by Damae (2005)
Damae " Not Over You " (2006)
Damae " Control " (2006) written by Damae
Schiller & Damae – " Lonely " (on the album "Sehnsucht") (2008) gold status / cowritten by Damae
Alex Guesta feat. Damae "Perfect Day" (2010)
Darren Baillie feat MLKB & Damae " Ocean Of Love " (2010) cowritten by Damae
Dave Kurtis & Damae " Fok Off " (2014) written by Damae
Damae " Castles in the Sky " (2015)
Mekki Martin & Damae " Shine " (2015) cowritten by Damae
Damae " Jaaana " (2015)
Damae " That Same Old Line "(Children) " (2015)
Damae " Nothing Left Between Us " (2015)
Luca Debonaire & Robert Feelgood Feat Damae " Better Off Alone "(2016)
Saint Tropez Caps feat Damae " Human Nature "(2016)
Luca Debonaire & Mike Ferullo Feat Damae " We´re Not Alone "(2016) written by Damae
Ryan Thistleback & Dan Winter ( vocals by Damae ) " Tell Me Now " (2016) written by Damae
Ryan Thistleback & Dan Winter feat. Damae "My Wonder" (2016)
written by Damae Saint Tropez Caps & Robert Feelgood feat. Damae "The Key, The Secret" (2017)
Damae & The Scene Kings " Release Me " (2017)
Damae " My Momma Said " (2017) written by Damae Damae "Fascinated (Luca Debonaire Summer Mix)" (2017)
Damae " Phoenix " (2017)
written by Damae
Damae "Illusion" (2017)
written by Damae
Ryan Thistleback & Dan Winter feat. Damae "You And Me" (2018)
written by Damae
DJ T.H. & Nadi Sunrise "Ordinary World" (2019) written by Damae
Damae "Gimme Your Love (Nanananana)" (2018)
written by Damae
Damae, KRAFT & Jesus Luz "Outta Here" (2019)written by Damae
Damae & Scoopheadz "Getting Up" (2019) written by Damae
Damae & Scoopheadz "Wonderful Days" (2019)
