= Everytime You Need Me =

2001 single by Fragma

Single by Fragma featuring Maria Rubia

from the album Toca
- Released: 1 January 2001
- Length: 3:30
- Label: Edel; Orbit; Gang Go Music
- Songwriters: Ramon Zenker; Dirk Duderstadt; Marco Duderstadt; Joern Friese
- Producer: Ramon Zenker

Fragma singles chronology
"Toca's Miracle" (2000)	"Everytime You Need Me" (2001)	"You Are Alive" (2001)

Music video
- "Everytime You Need Me" on YouTube

"Everytime You Need Me" is a song by German trance group Fragma featuring English singer Maria Rubia. It was released in January 2001 as the third single from their debut album, Toca (2001). The single peaked at number three on the UK Singles Chart and in Finland while also becoming a top-10 hit in Ireland and Norway.

The song was remade in 2011 (titled "Everytime You Need Me 2011") with a new instrumental featuring vocals from Damae and new remixes.

== Track listings ==
- German CD single
1. "Everytime You Need Me" (radio edit) – 3:30
2. "Everytime You Need Me" (extended version) – 5:15
- German 12-inch single

A1. "Everytime You Need Me" (extended version) – 5:15
A2. "Everytime You Need Me" (Pulsedriver remix) – 7:20
B1. "Everytime You Need Me" (Jam X & De Leon's Dumonde remix) – 7:49

- European maxi-CD single
1. "Everytime You Need Me" (radio edit) – 3:30
2. "Everytime You Need Me" (extended version) – 5:15
3. "Everytime You Need Me" (Pulsedriver remix) – 7:20
4. "Everytime You Need Me" (Jam X & De Leon's Dumonde remix) – 7:49
- UK CD1
1. "Everytime You Need Me" (radio edit) – 3:30
2. "Everytime You Need Me" (Pulsedriver vocal remix) – 7:25
3. "Everytime You Need Me" (Above & Beyond remix) – 8:37
4. "Everytime You Need Me" (enhanced video)
- UK CD2
1. "Everytime You Need Me" (extended version) – 5:15
2. "Toca's Miracle" (Life of Riley remix) – 6:48
3. "Toca's Miracle" (DJ Garry's 2001 Mix) – 4:13
- US maxi-CD single
1. "Everytime You Need Me" (radio edit)
2. "Everytime You Need Me" (extended mix)
3. "Everytime You Need Me" (Above & Beyond remix)
4. "Everytime You Need Me" (Pulsedriver mix)
5. "Everytime You Need Me" (Jam X & De Leon's Dumonde remix)
- Australian CD single
1. "Everytime You Need Me" (radio edit) – 3:30
2. "Everytime You Need Me" (Pulsedriver edit) – 2:50
3. "Everytime You Need Me" (extended version) – 5:15
4. "Everytime You Need Me" (Pulsedriver remix) – 7:20
5. "Everytime You Need Me" (Jam X & De Leon's Dumonde remix) – 7:49

== Charts ==
=== Weekly charts ===
Chart (2001)	Peak position
Australia (ARIA)	17
Australian Dance (ARIA)	2
Austria (Ö3 Austria Top 40)	42
Belgium (Ultratop 50 Flanders)	46
Denmark (Tracklisten)	11
Europe (Eurochart Hot 100)	8
Finland (Suomen virallinen lista)	3
Germany (GfK)	19
Ireland (IRMA)	5
Ireland Dance (IRMA)	3
Italy (Musica e dischi)	41
Netherlands (Dutch Top 40)	18
Netherlands (Single Top 100)	51
Norway (VG-lista)	4
Romania (Romanian Top 100)	3
Scotland Singles (OCC)	1
Spain (PROMUSICAE)	11
Sweden (Sverigetopplistan)	19
Switzerland (Schweizer Hitparade)	42
UK Singles (OCC)	3
US Dance Club Play (Billboard)	6
US Maxi-Singles Sales (Billboard)	18

=== Year-end charts ===
Chart (2001)	Position
Australia (ARIA)	89
Europe (Eurochart Hot 100)	99
Ireland (IRMA)	72
Romania (Romanian Top 100)	8
UK Singles (OCC)	42

== Certifications ==
Region	Certification	Certified units/sales
Australia (ARIA)	Gold	35,000^{^}
United Kingdom (BPI)	Silver	200,000^{^}
^{^} Shipments figures based on certification alone.

== Release history ==
Region	Date	Format(s)	Label(s)	Ref.
United Kingdom	1 January 2001	12-inch vinyl; CD	Positiva	
Germany	8 January 2001	Maxi-CD	Edel; Orbit; Gang Go Music	
Australia	29 January 2001	Maxi-CD	X-Over; Jive	
