= Galleon (album) =

Studio album by Galleon
- Released: France 2002; United States November 4, 2003 (Re-Issue)
- Recorded: 2000–2001
- Genre: House, Eurodance, Europop, electropop
- Length: 1:08:33
- Label: Epic Group Project, Radikal Records
- Producer: —

Singles from Galleon
- 1. "So I Begin" Released: 2001; 2. "I Believe" Released: 2001; 3. "One Sign" Released: 2002; 4. "The Way" Released: 2002

Galleon is a debut album by French house band Galleon. It was released in 2002. The album contains three singles, "So I Begin", "I Believe" and "One Sign".

== Group members ==
- Michel Fages
- Phillippe Laurent
- Gilles Fahy

== Track listing ==
1. "So I Begin" - 3:57
2. "Shining Light" - 3:55
3. "One Sign" - 3:36
4. "The Best World" - 4:25
5. "I Believe" - 3:57
6. "Da Rock" - 5:10
7. "Rhythm & Melody" - 2:14
8. "Each Day" - 4:22
9. "Money & Work" - 4:21
10. "The Way" - 5:18
11. "My Name" - 4:00
12. "Angel Wings" - 3:56
13. "Ghost Ship" - 6:57
14. "Freedom to Move (Levi's Theme)" - 3:57

== Chart performance ==
Chart (2002)	Peak position
French Albums Chart	54
Swiss Albums Chart	76
