= Chiara Zeffirelli =

French classical crossover soprano (born 1976)

- Born: Chiara Zeffirelli; 16 July 1976 (age 50)
- Origin: Avignon, France
- Genres: Neoclassical, Pop, Electro rock Classical; Opera
- Years active: 2000–present

Chiara Zeffirelli (born 16 July 1976, in Avignon) is a French classical crossover soprano.

She performed the role of Aïra, the betrayed princess of the post-modern opera "Atylantos" by Jean-Patrick Capdevielle.

Recently she had some performances in Mexico City and Pachuca de Soto with the Mexican Crossover tenor Oscar Aguilar.

== Discography ==
=== Albums ===
- Atylantos written and produced by Jean-Patrick Capdevielle and featuring Chiara Zeffirelli, Elena Cojocaru, Jade Laura d'Angelis, and Nikola Todorovich.(Album, 2001, Pendragon Records/Universal Music Group)

=== Other releases ===
- Spente le Stelle (Opera Trance) - The Remixes - Part One (Remix album, 2000, Radikal Records)
- Pasión por la Luna (Compilation album, 2010, EMI)
