= Rob Davis (musician) =

English guitarist (born 1947)

- Born: Robert Berkeley Davis; 1 October 1947 (age 79); Carshalton, Surrey, England
- Genres: Glam rock; electronic
- Occupations: Musician; singer-songwriter; producer
- Instruments: Guitar, keyboards
- Years active: 1962–present
- Member of: Mud

Robert Berkeley Davis (born 1 October 1947) is an English guitarist and songwriter who achieved early fame as a founding member of glam rock band Mud in the 1970s. He had songwriting success in the 1990s and 2000s, penning vocal arrangements for dance hits including "Can't Get You Out of My Head" for Kylie Minogue, Fragma's "Toca's Miracle" and Spiller's "Groovejet (If This Ain't Love)".

== Early career ==
Davis received his first guitar aged 11, and music became a central part of his life. In 1962, at 15, he and Dave Mount formed a band called The Apaches, with a Shadows sound. He and Mount continued to work together in several bands, including the Barracudas, and in 1964 formed the Remainder. He joined the Mourners, who were looking for a lead guitarist and in February 1966 changed their name to Mud.

== Mud ==
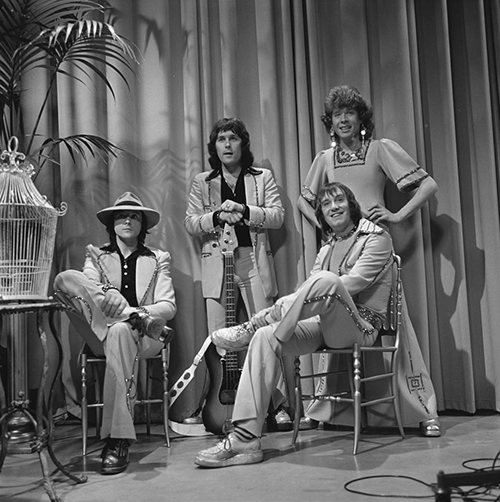
Davis (standing, right) with Mud in 1974

Davis was a founding member of the successful late 1960s and 1970s glam rock band Mud. In addition to playing lead guitar, he wrote a number of the band's songs. He wrote the band's first single, "Flower Power" which was released in the October 1967 but did not garner much success. While he did not compose any of the songs on the band's first two full albums, he wrote or co-wrote over 45 songs for the band and their subsequent albums. His first and biggest songwriting hit with Mud was "L'L'Lucy" which reached number 10 on the UK Singles Chart in September 1975. It became a bigger hit in both Belgium and the Netherlands, where it reached No. 1 for twelve and nine weeks, respectively. Davis wrote the B-sides on two of Mud's biggest hits, "Tiger Feet" and "Dyna-Mite". The band broke up in 1980.

== Other groups ==
Davis worked with several other groups, including the Tremeloes and Darts, but his efforts met with little commercial success.

== Songwriting ==
Although Davis wrote many of Mud's later songs, he achieved songwriting success commercially after the band disbanded starting with a writing and producing partnership with George Stanley Alexander that saw some hits with disco group Liquid Gold. Following a chance meeting with Paul Oakenfold in the late 1980s, he continued to move genres from rock and disco to writing club and dance songs. He would receive instrumental tracks from producers and incorporate lyrics. The first hit with Oakenfold came with "Not Over Yet" by Grace in 1993 reaching No. 3 on the UK charts. He later worked with Coco Star, writing "I Need a Miracle" which was released in 1996 and the re-recorded version released in 1997 peaked at No. 39 in the UK.

In 2000, he achieved his biggest commercial songwriting successes. Fragma's "Toca's Miracle" became Davis' first No. 1 hit and was a mashup of Davis-written "I Need a Miracle" by Coco and Fragma's instrumental "Toca Me". The song was released on 10 April and won critical acclaim, peaking at No. 1 in the UK. There have been multiple re-releases that have achieved chart success. On 14 August 2000, Spiller released "Groovejet (If This Ain't Love)", on which he provided important lyrical support. The song reached No. 1 in five countries including the UK, Australia and New Zealand. It finished No. 8 on the UK 2000 year-end charts. In 2001, Davis scored a UK top 10 hit as one third of the group Stuntmasterz, with the mashup "The Ladyboy Is Mine".

In their first songwriting session together, Davis and Cathy Dennis wrote "Can't Get You Out of My Head" for Kylie Minogue. Released in 2001, it was the first song to have 3,000 radio plays in a single week in the UK, reached No. 1 in all but one European country and sold over four million copies. Davis and Dennis received an Ivor Novello Award for composing the most performed song of the year. The song was originally intended for Sophie Ellis-Bextor, but she turned it down according to Davis, although Sophie later claimed that the proposal never got to her in the first place. Davis soon met Minogue's A&R manager Jamie Nelson who liked it and wanted her to record it. While Minogue was not the original artist selected, Dennis believed Minogue was the best artist for the song. The two writers also teamed up to write Brooke Hogan's single, "Everything to Me", in 2004. The song reached #1 on the Billboard Singles Sales chart.

At the Grammy Awards of 2004, Davis shared a Grammy with co-producer Philip Larsen (Manhattan Clique) and performer Minogue, for another Minogue single "Come into My World", in the category of Best Dance Recording. The song reached No. 4 in Australia while peaking at No. 8 in the UK.

Davis also worked with Jan Johnston and together they wrote six songs including "Am I on Pause?". His latest commercial works include co-writing for the song "One Foot Boy" from Mika's album, The Boy Who Knew Too Much (2009).

== Television appearances ==
In December 2005, Davis appeared in the Channel 4 programme, Bring Back...The Christmas Number One. In January 2008, Davis appeared in the BBC Four television documentary, Pop, What Is It Good For? In December 2009, he appeared in the Channel 4 programme The Greatest Songs of the Noughties, which featured "Can't Get You Out of My Head", ranked at No. 9 (in a Top 20). In December 2018, Davis appeared on BBC One's Pointless Celebrities Christmas Special. In October 2021, he contributed to the Channel 5 series Britain's Biggest 70s Hits appearing on the 1970 episode alongside Ray Dorset and David Hamilton.
