= Paffendorf =

German dance project

- Also known as: Bellini
- Origin: Cologne, Germany
- Genres: Trance, eurodance, hands up
- Years active: 1998–present
- Members: Ramon Zenker; Gottfried Engels; Christian Schmitz; Nicolas Valli

Paffendorf is a German electronic dance music project. The group consists of Ramon Zenker, also producer of Fragma, Gottfried Engels and Nicolas Valli. The project is represented by the Cologne DJ Christian Schmitz, active on Tiger Records. Paffendorf is best known for their 2000 hit, "Where Are You", although they have had various successful hits across Europe, their best known in the UK being "Be Cool", which peaked at number 7 in the UK Singles Chart in June 2002. Their song, "Under My Skin", had become an Internet meme, featuring Momo, a character from the anime series Sumomomo Momomo repetitively imitating a train engine with her hands and jumping up and down. The song had been sped up to sound similar and rival to a more popular Internet meme, "Caramelldansen".

== History ==
Ramon Zenker was involved in a number of dance music projects in the late 80's, including Interactive ("Who Is Elvis"). Engel's and Zenker's Samba dance project Bellini, centered around three female singers, began in 1997 with the release of "Samba de Janeiro" in various versions. It became an international hit (#2 in Germany) and was followed by an album and more singles.

The project Paffendorf debuted with "Smile" (#22 in Germany) in 1998. "Ruf Mich An" / "Call Me Now" and "Terminator" achieved Top 50 status. In the year 2000 they continued in that vein and made their breakthrough: "Where are You" went into the German Top 15 with "Everybody Scream" also making the Top 50. Their hit album, Dance City was also placed firmly in the Top 50 of the album charts. The track "Rhythm And Sex" continued the run, whilst "Be Cool" went to #7 in the UK Singles Chart in June 2002. At the same time Zenker co-founded and produced the Fragma ("Toca's Miracle").

Their thirteenth single release, "Under My Skin", was successful in Japan, particular in the video hosting service, NicoNico Douga. It was first shown in a fan-vid featuring the character Momo from Sumomomo Momomo, plus the Jens O Remix version of the song that was shortened and played twice. Westerners sometimes called this the "Paffendorf Dance". Another version of this video involved characters from Lucky Star.

== Discography ==
=== Albums ===
- 2000: Dance City
- 2001: Be Cool
- 2007: Planet Dance

=== Singles ===
Year	Single	Peak chart positions					Album
Year	Single	AUT	GER	NED	SUI	UK	Album
1998	"Smile"	—	22	—	—	—	Dance City
1998	"Ruf Mich An"	—	49	—	—	—	Dance City
1998	"Terminator 2 Theme: Main Title"	—	49	—	—	—	Dance City
1999	"Allnight"	—	—	—	—	—	Dance City
1999	"Where Are You"	21	11	18	52	—	Dance City
2000	"Everybody Scream"	—	43	56	—	—	Dance City
2001	"Rhythm & Sex"	—	61	—	—	—	Be Cool
2002	"Be Cool"	41	29	—	—	7	Be Cool
2002	"Crazy, Sexy, Marvelous"	—	33	—	—	52	Planet Dance
2004	"Welcome to Africa"	—	—	—	—	—	Planet Dance
2005	"On & On"	—	80	—	—	—	Planet Dance
2005	"Stop That Shit!"	—	—	—	—	—	Planet Dance
2005	"Under My Skin"	—	—	—	—	—	Planet Dance
2006	"Vogue"	—	—	—	—	—	Planet Dance
2006	"La La La Girl"	—	—	—	—	—	Planet Dance
2006	"Where Are You 2007"	—	—	—	—	—	Planet Dance
2007	"It's Not Over"	—	—	—	—	—	Singles only
2009	"Self Control"	—	59	—	—	—	Singles only
2009	"Bring It Back"	—	—	—	—	—	Singles only
2009	"Discover"	—	—	—	—	—	Singles only
"—" denotes releases that did not chart

=== Videos ===
- 1998: Smile
- 1998: Ruf Mich An
- 1998: Terminator 2 Theme: Main Title
- 2000: Where Are You
- 2001: Rhythm & Sex
- 2002: Be Cool
- 2002: Crazy, Sexy, Marvellous
- 2005: On & On
- 2006: La La La Girl
- 2006: Where Are You 2007
