= I Need a Miracle (Coco Star song) =

1996 song performed by Coco Star

Single by Coco
- Released: 1996 / 1997
- Label: Greenlight Recordings; Positiva
- Songwriters: Victor Imbres; Rob Davis
- Producers: Victor Imbres; Rob Davis

Coco singles chronology
"I Need a Miracle" (1996)	"Toca's Miracle" (2000)

"I Need a Miracle" is a song written by Rob Davis and Victor Imbres and first released in 1996 by British singer Coco Star on Greenlight Recordings. It was re-recorded and released the following year on Positiva, reaching No. 39 on the UK Singles Chart and No. 8 on the UK Dance Singles Chart. The vocals were later sampled in 2000 by Fragma as a mashup with their 1999 song "Toca Me", titled "Toca's Miracle", which was a No. 1 hit in the UK. In 2016, British singer Tara McDonald covered the song.

== Tara McDonald version ==
"I Need a Miracle"

Single by Tara McDonald
- Released: 1 January 2016
- Recorded: 2015
- Label: Mercury; Universal Music France
- Songwriters: Victor Imbres; Rob Davis
- Producers: Adam Trigger; Nick Talos; Dee Adam; Tara McDonald

Tara McDonald singles chronology
"Vay K" (2014)	"I Need a Miracle" (2016)

Tara McDonald's version was chosen as the Europride anthem for 2016 remixed by Gregor Salto. The single charted at No. 83 in Portugal and No. 47 in France. McDonald's version of the song is produced in a tropical dance style and the BPM for this cover version is slower than the original. One line repeated often in this version is "I won't take nothing less than a deeper love", which McDonald felt was the message of the song she wanted to share.

=== Background ===
McDonald decided to record "I Need a Miracle" in 2015 after performing at the Bataclan to raise money for that year's Paris Pride, three months prior to the terrorist attack. The attack at Bataclan affected her deeply as people she worked with during her performance at the venue that were killed in the attack as well as staff from her record company Mercury/Universal France. She wanted to release a record about a deeper love and this song fitted that message perfectly.

=== Use in popular culture ===
The song was chosen as the Europride anthem for 2016 with a special remix by Gregor Salto. The Europride event was held in Amsterdam, which led to McDonald appearing on many televised concerts performing the record. Gregor Salto created a remix for the event, which was only used for promotion and not included in the official remix package.

In 2016, "I Need a Miracle" (Andros Remix) was used on the official soundtrack for a British film set in Ibiza titled White Island, starring Billy Zane and UK singer/rapper Example. It is used in a scene shot at the Ocean Beach club.

=== Philanthropy ===
On 22 May 2020, McDonald released an updated version of "I Need A Miracle" donating 100% of her royalties to the children's charity UNICEF during lockdown to raise money for children affected by covid-19.

=== Live performances ===
Tara McDonald's first televised performance of "I Need a Miracle" was at the charity event The Teleton, in Guayaquil, Ecuador in December 2015, a TV show shown nationwide in Ecuador and across Latin America. She also performed the single with an orchestra at the Join Our Freedom concert in Dam Square, Amsterdam on 27 July 2016 during Europride, which was televised nationwide through AvroTros in the Netherlands. McDonald also opened the canal parade for Europride performing the song live on the first boat alongside the Europride ambassadors, the performance was also televised nationwide in the Netherlands by Dutch company AvroTros and was also on various news channels. Her live performance at the closing concert for Europride 2016 on 7 August 2016 televised by Out TV in the Netherlands. She also performed live at the Winterpride closing concert in Gran Canaria 2016.

=== Music video ===
The official music video premiered on YouTube and Vevo on 2 May 2016. The video starts with a young couple arguing in a forest. McDonald appears performing in the forest and the couple follow a strange orb of light, which leads them through the forest to a gathering with their friends. McDonald appears at the end of the clip dressed as an angel wearing a couture dress by On Aura Tout Vu, which she described as a guardian of love. It was directed by Daniel F Holmes and produced by Guerrilla Shout.

=== Track listings ===
Digital download

1. "I Need a Miracle" – 3:18

French remixes EP

1. "I Need a Miracle" (Extended version) – 4.22
2. "I Need a Miracle" (Radio edit) – 3:18
3. "I Need a Miracle" (Criminal Sounds Remix) – 4.01
4. "I Need a Miracle" (Andros Remix) – 4.09
5. "I Need a Miracle" (Kayn Remix) – 4.21
6. "I Need a Miracle" (Adam trigger & Maximillian Remix) – 4.28
7. "I Need a Miracle" (The Deficient Remix) – 3.08
8. "I Need a Miracle" (Lovra Remix) – 4.26
9. "I Need a Miracle" (Jim Leblanc & Moox Remix) – 5.24
10. "I Need a Miracle" (Diego Miranda Remix) – 4.41

Spanish remixes EP

1. "I Need a Miracle" (Extended version) – 4.22
2. "I Need a Miracle" (Radio edit) – 3:18
3. "I Need a Miracle" (Criminal Sounds Remix) – 4.01
4. "I Need a Miracle" (Andros Remix) – 4.09
5. "I Need a Miracle" (Kayn Remix) – 4.21
6. "I Need a Miracle" (Adam trigger & Maximillian Remix) – 4.28
7. "I Need a Miracle" (The Deficient Remix) – 3.08
8. "I Need a Miracle" (Lovra Remix) – 4.26
9. "I Need a Miracle" (Jim Leblanc & Moox Remix) – 5.24
10. "I Need a Miracle" (Diego Miranda Remix) – 4.41
11. "I Need a Miracle" (Alexandra Damiani Remix) – 2.45

Italian remixes EP

1. "I Need a Miracle" (Extended version) – 4.22
2. "I Need a Miracle" (Radio edit) – 3:18
3. "I Need a Miracle" (Criminal Sounds Remix) – 4.01
4. "I Need a Miracle" (Andros Remix) – 4.09
5. "I Need a Miracle" (Kayn Remix) – 4.21
6. "I Need a Miracle" (Adam trigger & Maximillian Remix) – 4.28
7. "I Need a Miracle" (The Deficient Remix) – 3.08
8. "I Need a Miracle" (Lovra Remix) – 4.26
9. "I Need a Miracle" (Jim Leblanc & Moox Remix) – 5.24
10. "I Need a Miracle" (Diego Miranda Remix) – 4.41

Digital download 2020

1. "I Need a Miracle (Stay Home Edit) 2020" – 3:25

Remixes (I) EP

1. "I Need a Miracle" Gregor Salto Remix) – 4.40
2. "I Need a Miracle" (Andros, Bonhaus Remix) – 3.16
3. "I Need a Miracle" (Erick T Remix) – 3.32
4. "I Need a Miracle" (Toni Neri Remix) – 3.33
5. "I Need a Miracle" (Justus Remix) – 2.55
6. "I Need a Miracle" (Steve Forest & Te Pai Remix) – 2.17

Remixes (II) EP

1. "I Need a Miracle" Badvice DJ Remix) – 4.21
2. "I Need a Miracle" (Vannilaz Remix) – 4.09
3. "I Need a Miracle" (Erick T Remix) – 3.32
4. "I Need a Miracle" (Erick T Remix)(Extended) – 4.27
5. "I Need a Miracle" (Bzars Remix) – 3.54
6. "I Need a Miracle" (Fancy Folks Remix) – 4.16
7. "I Need a Miracle" (Rollroy Remix) – 4.36
1. "I Need a Miracle" (Karim Naas Remix) – 2.33

=== Charts ===
Chart (2016)	Peak position
Belgium (Ultratop 50 Flanders)	17
Denmark (Tracklisten)	98
France (SNEP)	47
Portugal (AFP)	83
