= Paul Connolly (music publisher) =

Music executive

Paul Connolly is a music publisher and music consultant. He was President of Universal Music Publishing Group (UMP) in Europe and the UK from 2005 to 2016. He now spends his time supporting others through his charitable work.

== Career ==
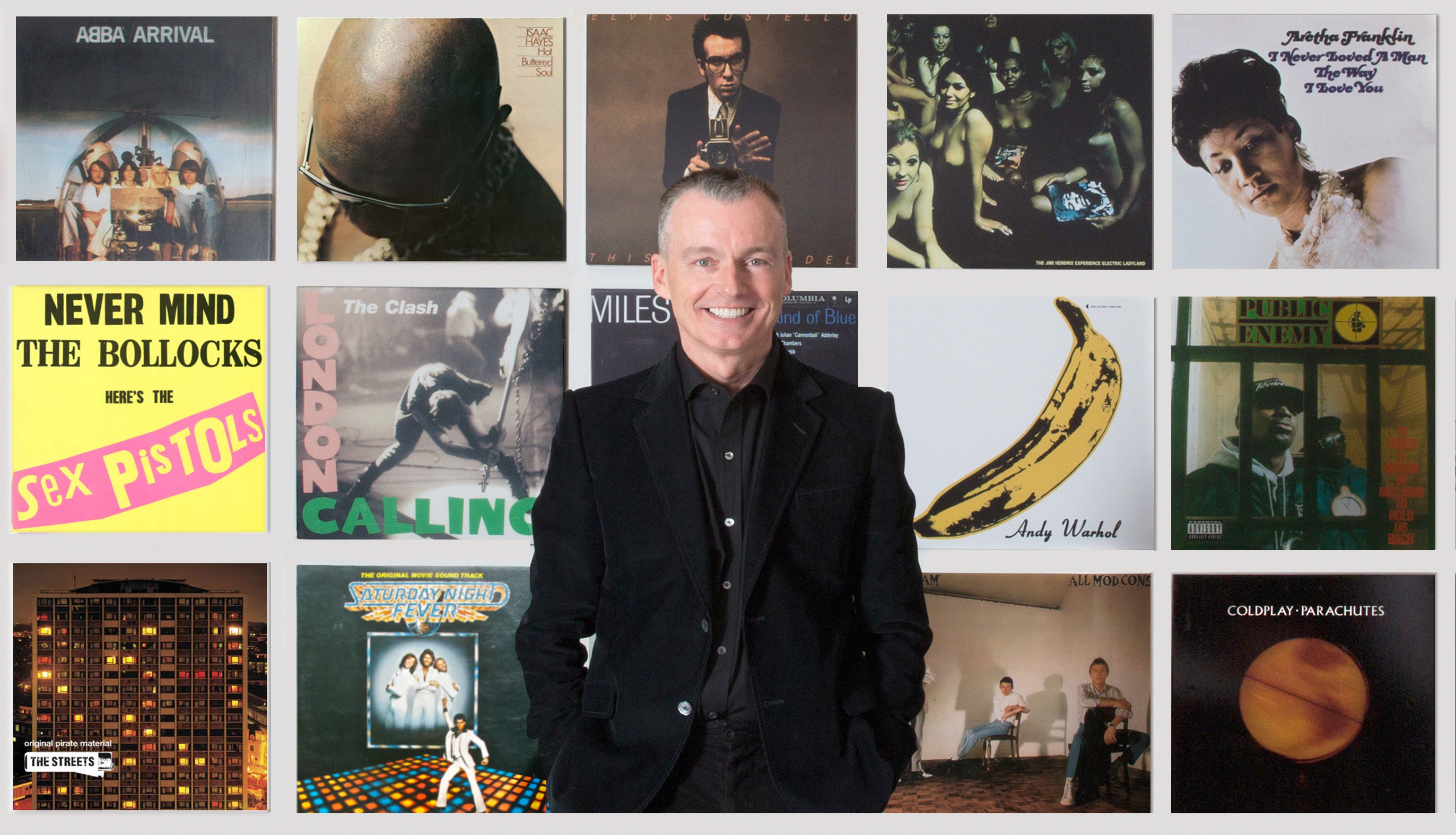
Paul Connolly

Paul Connolly was born in Basildon, Essex. After graduating from Queen Mary University of London with a degree in economics, he looked for work in the music business from a bedsit above a butcher's shop in Mile End, East London. On the subject, Connolly has stated; "All I knew at the time was I didn't want to wear a tie and I didn't want to work on a building site. All I had in the entire world was a large collection of vinyl records, and I thought 'Music industry, that could be quite good.'"

After his employment and subsequent termination from his first job in the accounts department at Beggars Banquet Records, he joined MCA Music as an A&R scout in 1988, working under managing director Nick Phillips.

Two years later he signed his first UK number one single, Killer by Adamski, which was released in 1990 and featured Seal on vocals. Killer was named Best Song at the Ivor Novello Awards in 1991. Later that year, Connolly was named as one of the rising stars of the British Music Industry in a feature by Music Week. In 1991 he was appointed A&R Director of MCA.

In 1993, after securing further publishing deals with N.W.A., Ice-T, PM Dawn, Jungle Brothers, Soundgarden, Smashing Pumpkins and Nine Inch Nails, he became Managing Director of MCA. During his tenure as MD of MCA, he and his team signed artists including DJ Shadow, Air, All Saints, The Chemical Brothers, and Basement Jaxx, as well as The Clash, The Smiths and The Sex Pistols. He became Vice President of MCA Music International in 1997.

When MCA merged in 1999 with Dutch music publisher Polygram, Connolly was chosen to be Executive Vice President for Europe and Managing Director in the UK, to head up the newly combined company, which had been renamed Universal Music Publishing. In 2005, after signing publishing deals with bands including The Streets, The Killers and Franz Ferdinand, he was promoted to UK and European President, and was invited to join the board of the Music Publishers Association that same year.

He oversaw the European side of Universal Music Publishing's €1.63bn acquisition of BMG Music Publishing in 2006, making UMP the largest music publishing company in the world. The same year, Connolly and his team signed Adele for her debut album 19, continuing to work with her on her number one follow up albums 21 and 25 – which cumulatively sold 65 million copies – as well as Skyfall, the theme tune for the James Bond film of the same name, which won both the Academy Award and Golden Globe Award for Best Original Song. During Connolly's career with UMP, the company developed a reputation for signing talent across all musical genres, including Adele, Bastille, The Clash, Chase & Status, Coldplay, Disclosure, Elton John, Elvis Costello, Florence + The Machine, Irving Berlin, Joy Division, The Killers, Lily Allen, Metallica, MGMT, Mumford & Sons, New Order, Paul Weller, Plan B, Sigur Ros, The Sex Pistols, The Smiths, and The xx.

== Charities and good causes ==
Following his music industry career spanning 30 years, including 28 years at Universal Music Publishing and 10 years as its President Europe & UK, Connolly has ventured into philanthropy. He works with the West Ham United Foundation, the official charity of West Ham United F.C., the football club which Connolly and his two children are life-time supporters of and season ticket holders for many years.

Other charities Connolly supports include Regenerate, which creates opportunities for young people to thrive, Home-Start, which provides a local community network of trained volunteers and expert support to help families with young children through difficult times, and Re-engage (formerly Contact The Elderly), which aims to combat loneliness in elders. He also contributes to the Richmond Food Bank and Sightsavers, a charity helping blind children in Africa.

== Industry honours ==
Connolly has been named Music Week's Music Publisher of the Year three times, and ASCAP Publisher of the Year four times. In 2011, he was named number one in the Guardian's Music Power 100 as part of Team Adele.
