= Toca's Miracle =

2000 single by Fragma

Single by Fragma

from the album Toca
- Released: 10 April 2000
- Genre: Trance (original mix); dance-pop; Eurodance; house (2008 edit)
- Length: 5:44 (original mix); 3:49 (album mix); 3:22 (radio edit)
- Label: Positiva; Tiger
- Songwriters: Dirk Duderstadt; Marco Duderstadt; Ramon Zenker; Rob Davis; Victor Imbres
- Producer: Ramon Zenker

Fragma singles chronology
"Toca Me" (1999)	"Toca's Miracle" (2000)	"Everytime You Need Me" (2001)

"Toca's Miracle" is a release by German vocal trance group Fragma featuring vocals from British singer Coco Star. Taken as the second single off Fragma's debut studio album, Toca (2001), the song is a mashup of Coco's "I Need a Miracle" (1996) and Fragma's own "Toca Me". The instrumental of the latter was composed by Dirk Duderstadt, Marco Duderstadt, Ramon Zenker and the lyrics of the former were written by Rob Davis and Victor Imbres, while the original music was produced by Zenker and the Duderstadts; the vocals were produced 3 years earlier by Imbres and Tim Orford.

The song was critically acclaimed worldwide, with many critics citing the song one of the best dance anthems of all time, praising its catchy tune. The recording was also a commercial success, remaining both Coco's and Fragma's best selling single to date. The recording topped the UK Singles Chart in April 2000 and peaked inside the top ten in countries including Australia, Denmark, Ireland, Italy, and Norway. A music video was issued, directed by Iain Titterington, depicting Coco Star at a game of futsal.

The single was re-issued in 2008 by Tiger Records with new remixes. It received mixed reviews from music critics but gained commercial success around the world. A new music video was issued for this version but does not feature Coco, which was a decision from Positiva Records. Tiger Records once again re-released the song in 2012.

== Background and recording ==
The Coco track "I Need a Miracle" was originally released by Greenlight Recordings in 1996 and re-recorded for EMI/Positiva in 1997.

Fragma's producer Ramon Zenker was asked by Positiva Records to mix "Toca Me" with the vocals of "I Need a Miracle" in a proper way for a single-release.

The whole story around this record is very funny — someone takes your record and takes another record, mixes them together, does a bootleg, sells it illegally, and then everybody plays it on the radio and the record company calls me and says 'We need this version!'"

-Ramon Zenker talking about mixing both "Toca's Miracle" and "Toca Me".

While mixing both recordings, he stated he couldn't believe how the music of "Toca Me" and the vocals of "I Need a Miracle" fit together. "I thought these two songs waited for each other". "Fortunately, this Coco single was on Positiva, which is the same label we are on, That was very good, so Kevin from Positiva A&R sorted things out with Coco and her management, and it was very quick to find a deal to use the vocals. 'I Need A Miracle' was three years old — a long time ago — and 'Toca's Miracle' was more successful than both knocked together, so there was benefit for both sides."

== Legal dispute ==
In late 2012, Coco Star revealed on her official Facebook page that the record label Positiva Records had confused the vocal recordings and sampled the original 1996 version of "I Need a Miracle" (released on Greenlight Records), instead of the 1997 re-recording (released on Positiva). She also wrote in the statement that the agreements that were entered "are now known to be 'unauthorised'". According to Star, she has never been paid for her vocal contribution to "Toca's Miracle" despite it selling over 3 million copies worldwide. She also claimed that she did not receive any airplay royalties from PPL until 2016.

On Coco Star's SoundCloud page, she wrote that the 2008 InPetto remix of "Toca's Miracle", produced by Dirk and Marco Duderstadt (the original writers of "Toca Me") as well as other remixes, were never authorised either.

Shortly after, Kirsty Hawkshaw revealed that Fragma had never paid her royalties for her contribution to the 2006 single "Radio Waves". According to Hawkshaw, a recording contract was never signed. Kirsty Hawkshaw and Coco Star both sued Tiger Records Germany in 2015.

=== Re-releases ===
In 2007, "I Need a Miracle" was covered by Danish production team KLM Music featuring re-recorded vocals by Coco Star. The cover version was released as "I Need a Miracle".

In 2008, it was announced that a re-release of "Toca's Miracle" would be released under the title "Toca's Miracle 2008". The production of one of the remixes is similar to the original version, but features a more "retro-rave" edit, with the song being remixed by InPetto. The song's composition was described as "subdued, electro-tinged sound, which betrays a marked deep house influence, 'Toca's Miracle 2008' veers perilously close to sounding classy." The song was eventually re-released in Australia as a CD single by Tinted Records, while it was released in Europe around spring 2008 by Tiger Records and Spinnin' Records with new artwork. Other remixes were by Wideboys, Richard Durand and Wes Clarke.

In 2012, the song was re-released as "Toca's Miracle (2012 Update)". It was issued on a compilation series issued by Ministry of Sound.

In April 2022, 22 years after its original release, "Toca's Miracle" by Fragma was re-released digitally following the release of a new vocal version recorded by Tess. This version also features on the new 20th anniversary edition of Fragma's debut album Toca.

On 1 July 2022, Coco Star released a new version of "I Need a Miracle" on Spinnin' Records. The release is credited solely to Coco Star, but is musically similar to "Toca's Miracle".

In June 2025, a remix titled "Miracle" by Sub Focus, Culture Shock and Fragma was released by Positiva/EMI. The drum & bass remix was initially conceived in 2023, having been teased in sets across 2024 and having an official release the following year.

== Critical reception ==
"Toca's Miracle" received critical acclaim. DJ Ron Slomowicz from About.com said ""Toca's Miracle" became one of those dance (and even club) standards - reaching the same pinnacle as Darude's "Sandstorm", which is considered the "gold-standard" of music production and Cher's "Believe". Another review from the publication compared the work to Canadian DJ Deadmau5, saying " The In Petto remix of "Toca's Miracle" so eerily resembled Deadmau5 that online leaks mistakenly credited it to him [...]" With the same publication, the song was a runner-up for being the Best Remix/Re-release of 2008. Dancingastronaugh.net called it "one of the more classic progressive tunes of our time."

Nick Levine from Digital Spy gave it a fairly mixed review, only awarding it two stars out of five. He called it "modest beginnings", but believed that the original version was better, saying "[the original] remained pretty much inescapable for the rest of the year, especially for those who frequented provincial nightclubs and/or cultivated a fondness for freeview video channels." He later concluded by saying that "Toca's Miracle" presented more "class", but criticized the use of "class" in a "Euro club banger."

== Commercial performances ==
=== "Toca Me" and "I Need a Miracle" performances ===
"Toca Me" entered the top twenty on the UK Singles Chart, where it peaked at number 11. The song also entered inside the top twenty of the Irish Singles Chart, peaking at number 20. The song, however did not pursue the same success on the Dutch Top 100, peaking at number 49.

Coco Star's song, "I Need a Miracle", entered the UK singles chart at number 39 in addition to number eight on the UK Dance chart in November 1997.

=== Original edit ===
The song was additionally a commercial success when it was first released. The mash-up debuted at number twenty on the Australian Singles Chart and eventually peaked at number eight for three non-consecutive weeks. The mash-up spanned the charts for eighteen weeks. The mash-up entered at number sixteen on the Norwegian Singles Chart and peaked at number two for a sole week. The mash-up only spent one week on the Italian Singles Chart, peaking at number nineteen. The track entered at eleven on the Spanish Singles Chart, where it ultimately peaked. The track re-entered on 10 May 2009 after its re-release.

The mash-up generated generally moderate success around Europe. Toca's Miracle peaked inside the top forty in Finland, Sweden, Belgium and managed to chart in countries including Switzerland, France and the Netherlands. The track debuted at number ninety-nine on the US Billboard Hot 100 in the United States.

In Coco's native United Kingdom, the mash-up peaked at number one on the UK Singles Chart. The track entered with over 185,000 copies sold in its first week, becoming the highest-charting single that month and was certified platinum by the British Phonographic Industry (BPI) in 2013. As of August 2000, the track alone has sold over 500,000 copies in the United Kingdom.

=== 2008 InPetto remix ===
The 2008 edit received generally good commercial success. The song reached number two in Spain, a better position than the original version. The song also peaked inside the top ten in Sweden at seven, and eighteen in The Netherlands. The song peaked at ten on the New Zealand Airplay Charts and inside the top twenty on the Australian Dance Singles Chart.

To date, with the re-release, the song has reportedly sold over 3 million copies worldwide.

=== "I Need a Miracle" (later versions) ===
After several mixes were released worldwide, some versions have been lucky to chart on record charts around the globe. In Austria, a 2012 update version of Coco's original (known as the "Guru Project Remix") debuted at number sixty for a sole week until falling out. Piror, in Belgium, a Dimitri Vegas & Like Mike Remix of Coco's 2009 version of "I Need a Miracle" was issued at charted at number thirty-seven on the Belgium Singles Chart and stayed in there for four weeks in total. It peaked at three on the Belgium Dance Charts. These recordings an entirely different sound recording of "I Need a Miracle" and are not to be confused with "Toca's Miracle".

== Music videos ==
"Toca Me" 1999 Fragma original video, which is filmed in Ibiza, features British-Spanish vocalist songwriter and dancer Mizz Martinez, formerly known as Eva Martinez.

The original video for "Toca's Miracle" which was directed by Iain Titterington and broadcast in 2000, features a futsal team of girls, including original singer Coco. Another team enter the locker rooms, where they look intimidating towards the other team. Both teams head towards the court and toss a coin, where Coco's team kicks-off first. The opposition take a 2–0 lead, and begin to become more aggressive or competitive towards the game, obstructing the other team. However, as the game nears its end, Coco's team make a comeback to win 3–2.

The 2008 video is completely different from the 2000 video and is the only video not to feature vocalist Coco (then going by the name Coco Star). The video starts with a woman in a room, lip-syncing the song, then begins to strip her clothes off and tries to kiss a man. The next shot features another woman in her bra and underwear, dancing in a supposed bathroom, with another man in the room. Another scene then shows, yet another woman on her bed, where she also has her bra and underwear. She also lip-syncs to the song playing and starts to seduce a man, laying near the bed. The video ends with one of the woman's eye closes.

== Track listings ==
- UK 2000 CD single
1. "Toca's Miracle" (radio edit) - vocals by Coco
2. "Toca's Miracle" (club mix) - vocals by Coco
3. "Everybody Knows"
- Australian 2008 CD single
1. "Toca's Miracle" (Inpetto edit) - vocals by Coco
2. "Toca's Miracle" (Richard Durand remix edit) - vocals by Coco
3. "Toca Me" (Inpetto 2008 edit)
4. "Toca's Miracle" (Inpetto remix) - vocals by Coco
5. "Toca's Miracle" (Richard Durand remix) - vocals by Coco
6. "Toca Me" (Inpetto 2008 remix)

== Charts ==
=== "Toca Me" ===
Chart (1999–2000)	Peak position
Australia (ARIA)	53
Ireland (IRMA)	20
Netherlands (Single Top 100)	49
Scottish Singles Sales (Official Charts)	9
UK Singles (Official Charts)	11
UK Dance (Official Charts)	1

=== "Toca's Miracle" ===
==== Weekly charts ====
Chart (2000)	Peak position
Australia (ARIA)	8
Belgium (Ultratop 50 Flanders)	24
Belgium (Ultratip Bubbling Under Wallonia)	14
Belgium Dance (Ultratop Flanders)	15
Canada Dance/Urban (RPM)	4 (Note: "Toca's Miracle" reached number 4 when RPM ceased publication in November 2000.)
Denmark (IFPI)	5
Europe (Eurochart Hot 100)	9
Finland (Suomen virallinen lista)	16
France (SNEP)	65
Germany (GfK)	46
Iceland (Íslenski Listinn Topp 40)	29
Ireland (IRMA)	4
Italy (FIMI)	19
Netherlands (Dutch Top 40 Tipparade)	2
Netherlands (Single Top 100)	63
Norway (VG-lista)	2
Scottish Singles Sales (Official Charts)	1
Spain (Promusicae)	11
Sweden (Sverigetopplistan)	18
Switzerland (Schweizer Hitparade)	55
UK Singles (Official Charts)	1
UK Dance (Official Charts)	1
US Billboard Hot 100	99
US Dance Club Play (Billboard)	9
US Maxi-Singles Sales (Billboard)	6

==== Year-end charts ====
Chart (2000)	Position
Australia (ARIA)	45
Belgium (Ultratop 50 Flanders)	85
Denmark (IFPI)	30
Europe (Eurochart Hot 100)	75
Ireland (IRMA)	35
UK Singles (OCC)	7
US Maxi-Singles Sales (Billboard)	26

=== "Toca's Miracle 2008" ===
==== Weekly charts ====
Chart (2008)	Peak position
Australia (ARIA)	89
Austria (Ö3 Austria Top 40)	42
Brazil Dance (Billboard)	1
CIS Airplay (TopHit)	64
Czech Republic Airplay (ČNS IFPI)	7
Germany (GfK)	73
Hungary (Dance Top 40)	8
Hungary (Rádiós Top 40)	8
Netherlands (Dutch Top 40)	18
New Zealand Airplay (RIANZ)	10
Poland (Polish Airplay Charts)	5
Romania (Romanian Top 100)	23
Russia Airplay (TopHit)	1
Scottish Singles Sales (Official Charts)	9
Slovakia Airplay (ČNS IFPI)	34
Spain (Promusicae)	2
Sweden (Sverigetopplistan)	7
UK Singles (Official Charts)	16
UK Dance (Official Charts)	1
Ukraine Airplay (TopHit)	62

==== Year-end charts ====
Chart (2008)	Position
Hungary (Dance Top 40)	48

=== "Toca Me 2008" ===
==== Weekly charts ====
Chart (2008)	Peak position
Hungary (Dance Top 40)	22

==== Year-end charts ====
Chart (2008)	Position
Hungary (Dance Top 40)	83

=== "I Need a Miracle" (re-vocal) ===
Chart (2012)	Peak position
Austria (Ö3 Austria Top 40)	60
Belgium (Ultratop 50 Flanders)	37

== Certifications ==
Region	Certification	Certified units/sales
United Kingdom (BPI)	Platinum	600,000^{^}
^{^} Shipments figures based on certification alone.

== Release history ==
Region	Date	Format(s)	Label(s)	Ref(s).
United Kingdom	10 April 2000	12-inch vinyl; CD; cassette	Positiva	
United States	8 August 2000	Rhythmic contemporary radio	Strictly Rhythm; Atlantic	
United States	3 October 2000	Contemporary hit radio	Groovilicious; Atlantic	
