= Maria Rubia =

British singer

- Born: Norwich, England
- Occupations: Singer; model; TV presenter
- Years active: 2000–present
- Label: Crazy Dog
- Website: mariarubiaofficial.com

Maria Rubia is an English singer, model and TV presenter. She debuted as the vocalist on Fragma's dance song "Everytime You Need Me", which remained on the UK singles chart for 11 weeks, and the sales thereof earned her a silver disc.

== Discography ==
=== Singles ===
- Fragma feat. Maria Rubia – "Everytime You Need Me" (2001) No. 3 UK
- "Say It" (2001) No. 40 UK
- Double N feat. Maria Rubia – "Forever and a Day" (2002)
- Akyra feat. Maria Rubia – "Here Comes the Rain Again" (2003)
- Fragma x Bodybangers remix ft. Maria Rubia "Everytime You Need Me" 2022
- "Eye of the Storm" (2022) released on Crazy Dog Records
