= William Galeon =

English friar

William Galeon (died 1507), was a learned English Augustinian.

Galeon was born in Norfolk, and became a friar eremite in the Augustinian monastery of Lynn Regis. Bale says that he was already of 'mature years' when he went to Oxford, where he studied for several years among the brethren of his order in their college. He was chiefly renowned for his minute knowledge of theology, and took a D.D. degree probably before he left the university. He was much esteemed by his contemporaries, and having moved through several honourable stations, was chosen provincial of his order in England. He died at Lynn in 1507 in the prime of life, and was buried in the church of his order there. Galeon was looked upon as a great ornament to his society, which he is said to have roused from slothfulness.

Bale says that he gave many of his writings in his lifetime to his own religious house at Lynn. Bishop Pamphilus is incorrect in his statement that Galeon died in 1500, aged 90. The works ascribed to him are: Lectiones in Theologia, Disputationes Variæ and /Conciones per Annum.
