= MC Mario =

Canadian song producer, DJ and radio host

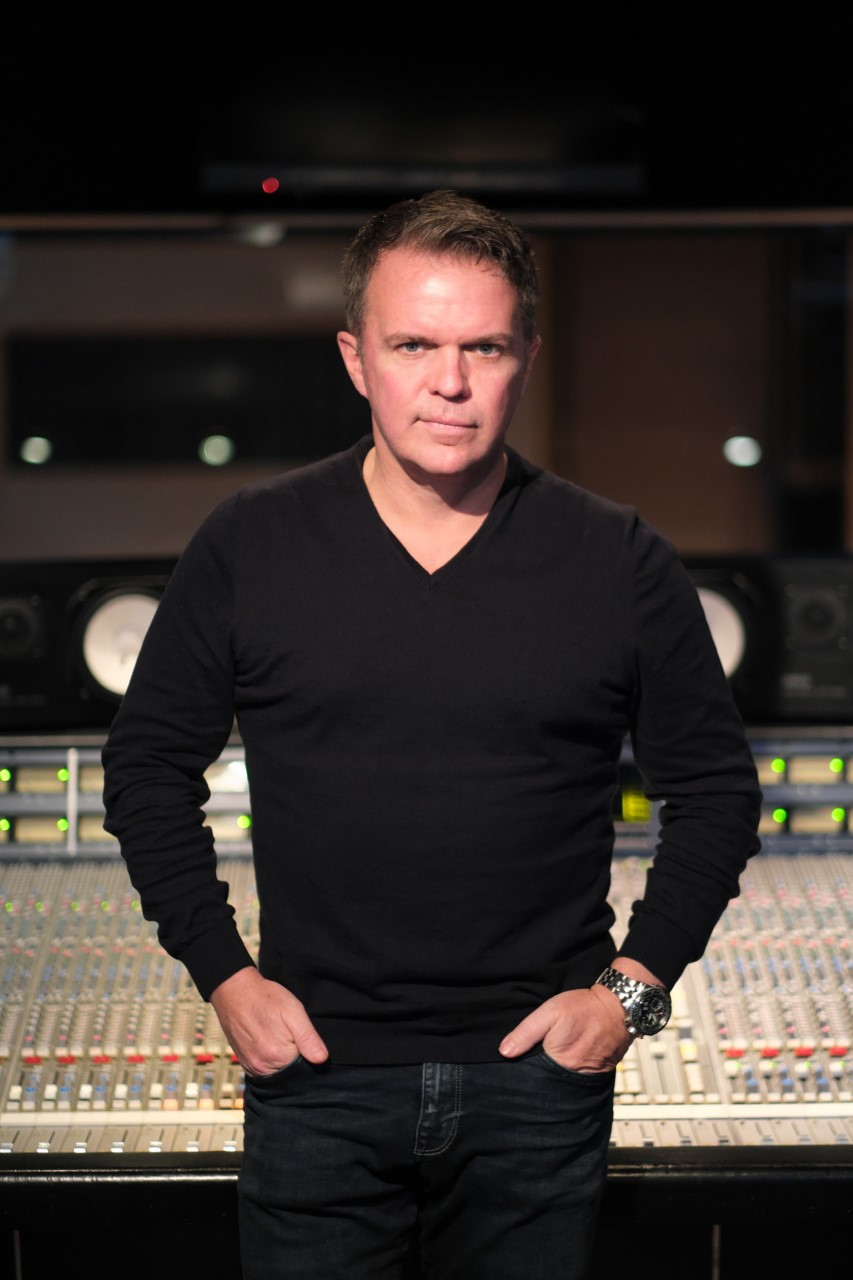
- MC Mario in late 2017

Background information
- Born: Mario Tremblay
- Origin: Montreal, Quebec, Canada
- Occupations: Producer, DJ, radio host
- Years active: 1987–present
- Website: mcmario.com

Mario Tremblay, better known under his moniker MC Mario, is a Canadian disc jockey and a former Virgin radio host from Montreal, Quebec.

== Biography ==
Born circa 1970, Mario studied in sound tracking/acoustic equipment at the UQAM. Upon graduating, he would go on to start his radio career in late 1980s with CKMF-FM (as a co-host) in Montreal, prior to switching to CJFM in 1991 which is now Virgin Radio Montreal. And as of now, he has stopped broadcasting at Virgin Radio Montreal as of November 19, 2021. He currently hosts “The Party Weekend” on The Beat 92.5 starting at 5 every weekend.

In 2010 he has taken up co-ownership of the prestigious Club 1234 (now known as Yoko Luna - 2023) where he's also shared the stage with DJs like Carl Cox, Bob Sinclar, Axwell, and others. From 1995 and up until 2021 he has hosted #1 Canadian Dance Party "The House Party" every weekend on Virgin Radio Montreal as well.

Since 1993, he has been releasing mixtape compilations of various EDM artists at least 3 times a year. To date, MC Mario has sold more than 3.5 million albums in Canada alone, making him the 28th biggest selling Canadian artist of all-time. His album Summer Anthems 2011 was certified gold by Music Canada on December 21, 2011.

Additionally, since 2003, he is also known for producing his own tracks (alongside promotional young remixers). Some of his latest single productions include "Rockstar" (2012), "Lose My Mind" ft. Stephane Moraille (2013), "Anti Gravity" ft. Kirsten Collins (2014), "Love is Who We Are" (2015), "Dreamers" ft. Vanessa Piunno (2016), and "Tears of Heaven" (2018).

He has also been known to release remixes of tracks by several local and worldwide artists, such as "Thousand Miles" by Stevyn (2017), "U Gave Me" by Noah Ayrton (2018) and others. With his single "Breakaway" featuring BE1 (2019), MC Mario joined Canadian music label Funktasy. His most recent releases on the international label in 2020 were "No Xplanation" and "Biggie's Soul" a collaboration with Hoss as part of MC Mario & Hoss.

MC Mario was also the official DJ of the Montreal Canadiens and was with the team when they won the Stanley Cup in 1993.

In November 2021, MC Mario and Virgin Radio Montreal parted ways after 30 years.

== Releases ==
1990s

- 1993 Hits Of The World (Quality Records)
- 1994 Back to Basics (Quality Records)
- 1994 The Dance Cycle (Quality Records)
- 1995 King Size (Quality Records)
- 1995 Rewinds - It's a Disco World (Polytel)
- 1995 Feeling Station (Polytel)
- 1996 Connexion (Polytel)
- 1996 100 % Natural Dance (Polytel)
- 1996 La crème de la crème (Polytel)
- 1996 Rewind Vol. 2 (Polytel)
- 1997 Danceteria (Polytel)
- 1997 Dome Party Mix '97 (Polytel)
- 1997 Dance 2000 (Sony)
- 1997 Back Track (Sony)
- 1998 Mixdown 98 (Sony)
- 1998 Sun Jammin' 98 (Sony)
- 1998 Dance 2001 (Sony)
- 1999 Mixdown 99 (Sony)
- 1999 '99 In the Sun (Sony)
- 1999 Dance 2002 (Sony)

2000-2006

- 2000 Mixdown 2000 (Sony)
- 2000 Sun Factory (Sony)
- 2000 90's Rewind (Sony)
- 2000 Party Mix (Sony)
- 2001 Mixdown 2001 (Sony)
- 2001 Sun Factory 2 (Sony)
- 2001 MCMARIO.COM (Sony)
- 2001 80's Rewind (Sony)
- 2002 Mixdown 2002 (Sony)
- 2002 Sun Factory 3 (Sony)
- 2002 Classic Rewind (Sony)
- 2002 Party Mix Canada (Sony)
- 2003 Mixdown 2003 (Sony)
- 2003 Sun Factory 4 (Sony)
- 2003 MCMARIO.COM V2.0 (Sony)
- 2004 Mixdown 2004 (Sony)
- 2004 Trance Divas (Sony)
- 2004 Sun Factory 5 (Sony)
- 2004 Party Mix 2004 (Sony)
- 2005 Mixdown 2005 (Sony)
- 2005 Sun Factory 6 (Sony)
- 2005 Party Mix 2K5 (Sony)
- 2006 Mixdown 2006 (Sony)
- 2006 Sun Factory 7 (Sony)
- 2006 Party Mix 2K6 (Sony)

2007-2012

- 2007 Mixdown 2007 (Sony)
- 2007 Sun Factory 8 (Sony)
- 2007 Most Wanted 2007 (Sony)
- 2008 Mixdown 2008 (Sony)
- 2008 Sun Factory 9 (Sony)
- 2008 Most Wanted 2008 (Sony)
- 2009 Mixdown 2009 (Sony)
- 2009 Sun Factory 10 (Sony)
- 2009 Most Wanted Of 2009 (Sony)
- 2010 Mixdown 2010 (Sony)
- 2010 Sun Factory 11 (Sony)
- 2010 Live @ 1234 (Sony)
- 2011 Mixdown 2011 (Universal Music Group)
- 2011 Summer Anthems 2011 (Universal Music Group)
- 2011 Clubland (Universal Music Group)
- 2012 Mixdown 2012 (Universal Music Group)
- 2012 Summer Anthems 2012 (Universal Music Group)
- 2012 Clubland Vol. 2 (Universal Music Group)

2013-Present

- 2013 Mixdown 2013 (Universal Music Group)
- 2013 Summer Anthems 2013 (Universal Music Group)
- 2013 MC Mario's Rewind (Universal Music Group)
- 2014 Mixdown 2014 (Universal Music Group)
- 2014 Summer Anthems 2014 (Universal Music Group)
- 2015 Mixdown 2015 (Universal Music Group)
- 2017 Summer Anthems 2017 (Vicktory Music Group)
- 2018 Summer Anthems 2018 (Vicktory Music Group)
- 2019 Mixdown 2020 (Vicktory Music Group)
