= Hardfloor =

German electronic music duo

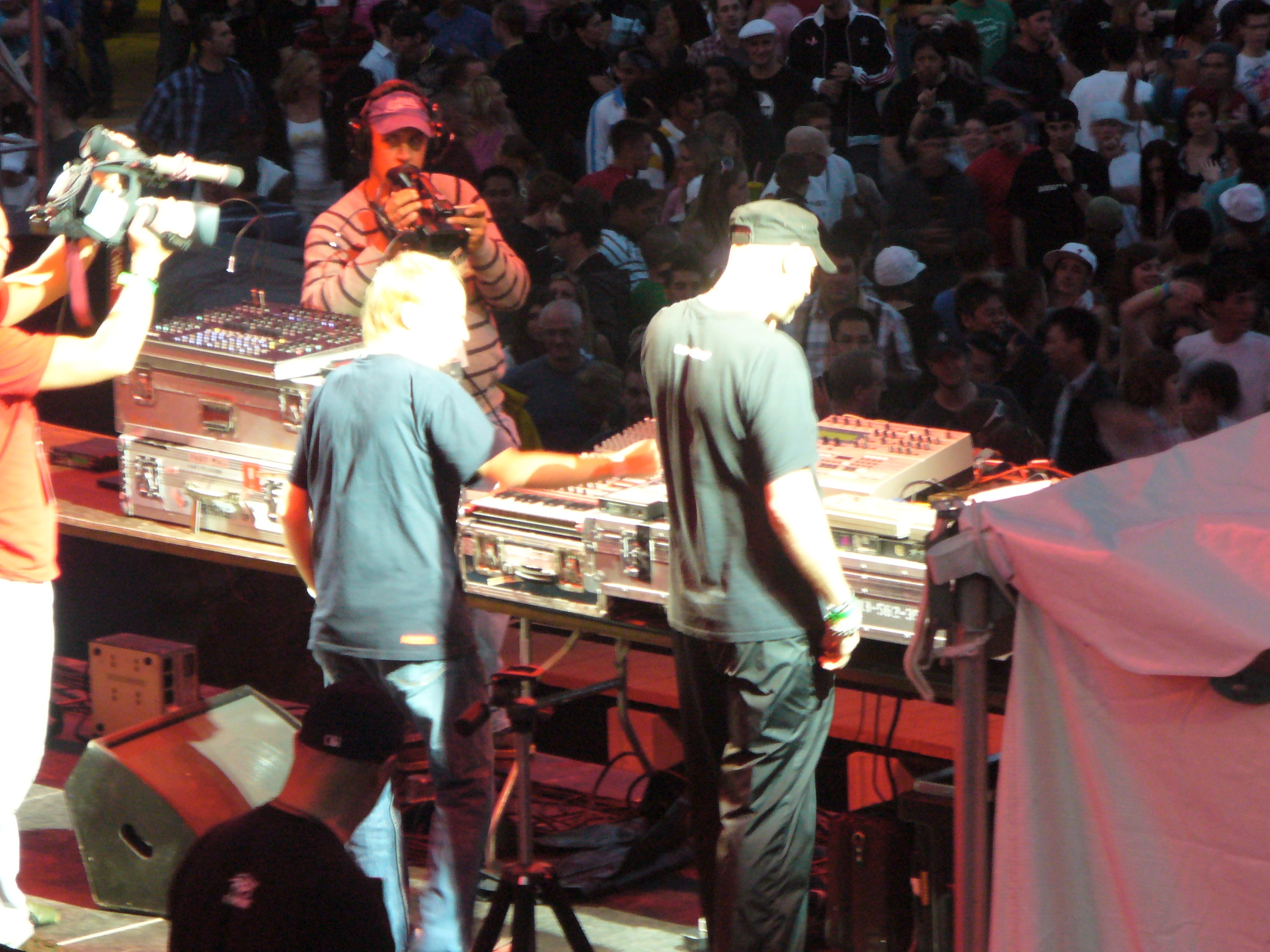
- Hardfloor performing at the Detroit Electronic Music Festival in 2007

Background information
- Origin: Cologne, Germany
- Genres: Hard trance, techno, acid trance, electronica
- Years active: 1991–present
- Members: Oliver Bondzio; Ramon Zenker

Hardfloor is a German electronic music duo, consisting of Oliver Bondzio and Ramon Zenker. Their most famous track is "Acperience 1" (often titled more simply as "Acperience" on many compilation albums) and chosen by Feargal Sharkey as one of his 'Inheritance Tracks' when interviewed on UK's BBC Radio 4.

Their distinctive acid house sound is attributed to their skill at manipulating Roland TB-303 bass synthesisers, using up to six of these machines at once. Their UK chart hits include "Hardtrance Acperience" (1992), "Trancescript" (1993) and the remix of the aforementioned "Acperience" (1997). Their 1996 album, Home Run, peaked at No. 68 on the UK Albums Chart.

== Discography ==
=== Albums ===
| TB Resuscitation | 1993 | Harthouse |
| Respect | 1994 | Harthouse |
| Home Run | 1996 | Harthouse |
| The Best of Hardfloor | 1997 | Eye Q Records |
| All Targets Down | 1998 | Harthouse |
| So What?! | 2000 | Harthouse |
| 4 Out of 5 Aliens Recommend This | 2005 | www.hardfloor.de |
| Compiler 1.0 | 2006 | www.hardfloor.de |
| The Life We Choose | 2007 | www.hardfloor.de |
| Two Guys Three Boxes | 2010 | www.hardfloor.de |
| The Art of Acid | 2014 | www.hardfloor.de |
| The Business of Basslines | 2017 | www.hardfloor.de |

==== Da Damn Phreak Noize Phunk ====
Hardfloor also released albums under the pseudonym Da Damn Phreak Noize Phunk. These songs tend toward the chillout and lounge genres.

| Electric Crate Digger | 1999 | Studio !K7 |
| Take Off Da Hot Sweater | 2002 | Combination Records |
| Lost & Found | 2003 | Combination Records |
| The Chearleaders Are Smilin' at You | 2009 | Mole Listening Pearls |

==== Mix albums compiled by Hardfloor ====
| Hardfloor presents X-MIX: Jack the Box | 1998 | Studio K7 |
| Our Acid Experience | 2006 | www.hardfloor.de |
| Tales of the Unexpected 3 - Mixed by Hardfloor | 2008 | Platipus Records |

=== Singles and EPs ===
| "Let Da Bass Go" | 1991 | Eye Q Records |
| "Drug Overlord" | 1992 | Eye Q Records |
| "Hardtrance Acperience EP" | 1992 | Harthouse |
| "Trancescript" | 1993 | Harthouse |
| "Into the Nature" | 1994 | Harthouse |
| "Funalogue Mini Album" | 1994 | Harthouse |
| "Mr. Anderson" / "Fish & Chips" | 1994 | Harthouse |
| "Mahogany Roots" | 1994 | Harthouse |
| "Respect" | 1994 | Harthouse |
| "Respected Remixes" | 1995 | Harthouse |
| "Da Damn Phreak Noize Phunk?" | 1995 | Harthouse |
| "Strikeout" | 1996 | Harthouse |
| "Beavis at Bat" | 1996 | Harthouse |
| "Da Damn Phreak Noize Phunk? Volume 2" | 1997 | Harthouse |
| "Hardfloor Will Survive". (collaboration with Phuture) | 1998 | Harthouse |
| "Skill Shot" | 1999 | Harthouse |
| "Smash the Gnat" | 2000 | Harthouse |
| "Communication to None" | 2001 | Harthouse |
| "Underexposed Above Average" | 2001 | Harthouse |
| "Alphabetical" / "Received Files" / "Me Too" | 2003 | www.hardfloor.de |
| "Da Revival" / "Hubbub Rub" | 2004 | www.hardfloor.de |
| "Soulful Spirit" / "Mrs. Broflovski" | 2004 | www.hardfloor.de |
| "Murano" / "Joppiemuffler" | 2004 | www.hardfloor.de |
| "Groupie Love" / "Plasticacid" / "Jack the House" | 2005 | www.hardfloor.de |
| "T 2 Da C" (Da Remixes) | 2005 | www.hardfloor.de |
| "Devils & Donuts" / "Who Took Da Box?" | 2006 | www.hardfloor.de |
| "Tugger" / "Butterflies in Bottermelk" | 2006 | www.hardfloor.de |
| "Hitchhiker Habits" / "Blueprint" (by Rob Acid) | 2006 | www.hardfloor.de |
| "707" (by Andreas Andreas) / "It's Him, It's Him" | 2007 | www.hardfloor.de |

=== Selected Hardfloor remixes ===
- Robert Armani - "Circus Bells" 1993 Djax-Up-Beats
- Rising High Collective - "Fever Called Love" 1993 Rising High Records
- Sourmash - "Pilgrimage to Paradise" 1994 Prolekult Records
- Mory Kante - "Yé ké yé ké" 1995 FFRR Records
- Mary Kiani - "When I Call Your Name" 1995 Mercury Records
- Bassheads - "Is There Anybody Out There?" 1995 Deconstruction Records (Desa Basshead)
- New Order - "Blue Monday" 1995 London Records
- Baby Doc and the Dentist - "Mantra to the Buddha" 1995 TEC (Truelove Electronic Communications)
- TWA - "Nasty Girls" 1995 Mercury Records
- The Shamen - "Destination Eschaton" 1995 Epic Records
- Depeche Mode - "It's No Good" 1997 Mute Records
- Mike Oldfield - "Let There Be Light" (Hardfloor Remix) 1995
