= Galleon (band) =

French house band

- Origin: Marseille, France
- Genres: French house, electronica
- Years active: 2001–2003, 2013-2014
- Past members: Michel Fages; Gilles Fahy; Phillippe Laurent
- Website: Galleon Official page

Galleon was a French house group from Marseille, founded by Michel Fages and Phillippe Laurent (who recruited Gilles Fahy for singing).

== Musical career ==
They emerged on the European dance scene in 2001 with a hit single "So I Begin" song in English. The single was released by Sony Music/Radikal Records and sold 400,000 copies, peaking at number 36 in the UK Singles Chart Also noteworthy is the accompanying music video featuring the model Jitka Ogurekova. After the initial success another two singles ensued ("I Believe", November 2001, "One Sign", June 2002 and "The Way", July 2002), followed by an album, called after band's name, Galleon by the end of 2002.

== Discography ==
=== Albums ===
Year	Title	Chart positions	
Year	Title	FRA	SWI
2002	Galleon	54	76

=== Singles ===
Year	Single	Peak chart positions								Certifications (sales thresholds)	Album
Year	Single	AUT	BEL (Vl)	BEL (Wa)	FRA	GER	NED	SWI	UK	Certifications (sales thresholds)	Album
2001	"So I Begin"	40	10	23	8	37	13	17	36	FRA: Silver	Galleon
2001	"I Believe"	—	17	3	43	—	—	20	—		Galleon
2002	"One Sign"	—	—	10	68	93	—	61	—		Galleon
