= Fragma =

German trance band

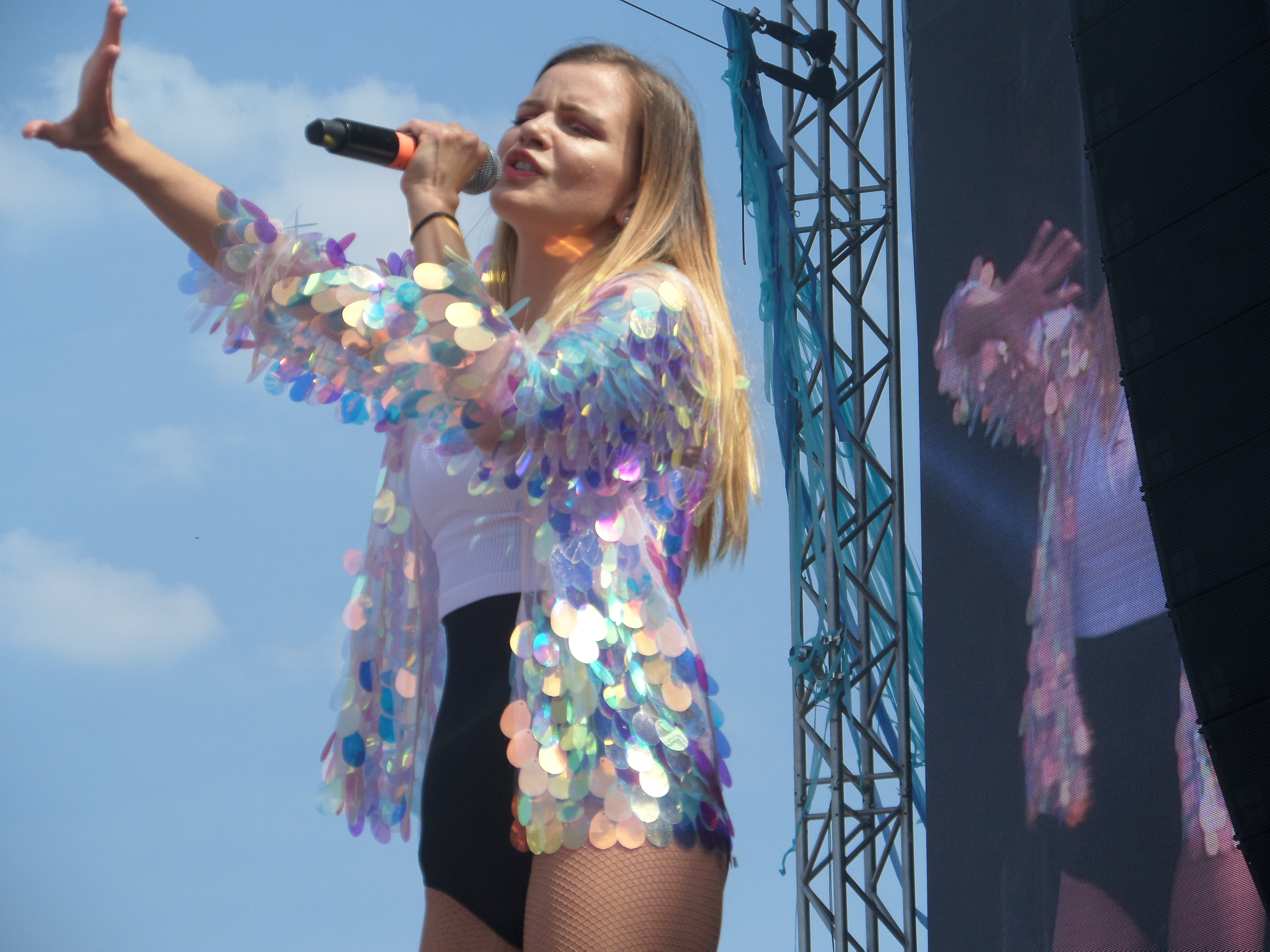

Background information
- Also known as: Duderstadt; Inpetto
- Origin: Cologne, Germany
- Genres: Trance; vocal trance; house; Eurodance
- Years active: 1998–2012; 2017–present
- Labels: Tiger; Positiva; Orbit
- Members: Ramon Zenker (producer); Dirk Duderstadt (producer); Marco Duderstadt (producer); Jörn Friese (songwriter); Tess (vocalist, lyricist)
- Past members: Damae (vocalist) (2000–2012)

Fragma is a German vocal trance music group, originally comprising three producers. The group was successful in the early 2000s when they released several singles that charted successfully across Europe, especially the United Kingdom and Ireland, but also found some success in the United States and Australia. They continued to produce music until 2012 following the departure of vocalist Damae. After several years of hiatus, Fragma recruited a new vocalist in 2017, Tess, to front the group.

== Musical career ==
Founded in 1998 by brothers Dirk and Marco Duderstadt, they produced their first single "Toca Me" with record producer Ramon Zenker. When it was released the following year, it topped several dance charts around the world, and reached No. 11 in the UK Singles Chart.

In 1999, a mash-up, "Toca's Miracle" was produced by DJ Vimto, taking the music of Fragma's "Toca Me" and placing the vocals from Coco Star's 1996 song "I Need a Miracle" (written for Coco Star by Rob Davis and Victor Imbres) over the instrumental. Originally released on Orbit Records in Germany, "Toca's Miracle" was licensed in the UK by Positiva Records. It went straight to number one in the UK chart, and was popular in Australia and Ireland. "Toca's Miracle" was described as a "song that was never really meant to be" by Billboard's Michael Paoletta. An album was released in 2001; Toca, as well as two other singles; "Everytime You Need Me" (UK No. 3), which featured vocals by Maria Rubia, and "You Are Alive" (UK No. 4) with vocals by Damae.

2002 saw the Duderstadts set up their own studio, called Evergreen-Terrace. The same year saw Fragma still operating with vocalist Damae, release a second album; Embrace, with hit singles such as "Say That You're Here", "Embrace Me", "Man in the Moon" and "Time and Time Again". During this period, Fragma parted with their UK record label Positiva and released "Say That You're Here" in December 2001 on Illustrious Records. The song charted at No. 25 and a hiatus on the UK chart singles chart began which lasted for several years.

In 2003, a remix of their single "Embrace Me", was featured in the anime adaptation of Dear Boys.

Dirk and Marco also worked as a duo under their surname Duderstadt. The singles "Sunrise" and "Taking Over" were released on Gang Go Records. A third single, "Mahananda", was released in 2005 on Afterglow Records. This was followed by the fourth single "Muhanjala" in 2006, and another featuring Anita Kelsey called "Smile" in 2007. The two are also known to produce under the name Inpetto (originally written as In Petto around 1999–2000).

In 2006, Fragma released the single "Radio Waves" together with Kirsty Hawkshaw. The track was co-written by Judie Tzuke.

2008 saw the release of "Toca's Miracle 2008" with the vocals of Coco Star and the InPetto remix of the original song. "Toca's Miracle 2008" reached number 2 on the Australian ARIA Club Charts and number 16 on the UK Singles Chart.

Fragma commenced touring again with Damae throughout Europe, where they featured on the Dance Nation tour in the UK. "Memory" was released through Hard2Beat and Ultra Records, followed by "Forever and a Day", which was released in November 2009.

In October 2012, Fragma announced through their official Facebook page that they had separated from singer Damae on 1 September 2012. This was in the same year as the release of their track "Thousand Times" and their collaboration with Akil Wingate on "Where Do We Go", both of which feature her vocals. She no longer represents Fragma at their live shows, as they continued working on productions with a different singer.

In 2017, Fragma recruited the vocalist Tess, who began performing with the group on their tours.

On 2 July 2021, Fragma released their first new music in nine years, a melodic dance track entitled "I Want More" with Tess on vocals.

== Discography ==
=== Studio albums ===
Title	Details	Chart positions							Certification
Title	Details	AUS	DEN	FIN	GER	NOR	SWE	UK	Certification
Toca	Released: 12 January 2001	81	39	21	53	15	54	19	BPI: Gold
Embrace	Released: 2002	—	—	—	—	—	—	—	

=== Singles ===
Year	Single	Featured vocals	Peak chart positions										Certifications (sales thresholds)	Album
Year	Single	Featured vocals	AUS	AUT	DEN	GER	IRE	NED	NOR	SWE	SWI	UK	Certifications (sales thresholds)	Album
1999	"Toca Me"	Eva Martinez	53	—	—	—	20	49	—	—	—	11	BPI: Silver	Toca
2000	"Toca's Miracle"	Coco (uncredited)	8	—	—	46	4	63	2	18	55	1	ARIA: Platinum; BPI: Platinum	Toca
2001	"Everytime You Need Me"	Maria Rubia	17	42	11	19	5	51	4	19	42	3	ARIA: Gold; BPI: Gold	Toca
2001	"You Are Alive"	Damae	37	13	16	23	20	—	13	45	67	4		Toca
2001	"Say That You're Here"	Damae	41	53	—	55	—	—	59	—	100	25		Embrace
2002	"Embrace Me"	Damae	—	—	—	81	—	—	—	—	—	—		Embrace
2002	"Time and Time Again"	Damae	74	—	—	44	—	—	—	—	—	—		Embrace
2003	"Man in the Moon"	Damae	—	—	—	56	—	—	—	—	—	—		Non-album singles
2005	"Born to Love"	Damae	—	—	—	—	—	—	—	—	—	—		Non-album singles
2006	"Radio Waves" (with Kirsty Hawkshaw)	Kirsty Hawkshaw	—	—	—	—	—	71	—	—	—	—		Non-album singles
2007	"Deeper"	Damae	—	—	—	—	—	—	—	—	—	—		Non-album singles
2008	"Toca's Miracle 2008"	Coco (uncredited)	89	42	—	73	—	18	—	7	—	16		Non-album singles
2008	"Memory"	Damae	—	74	—	64	—	28	—	—	30	—		Non-album singles
2009	"Forever and a Day"	Damae	—	—	—	—	—	—	—	—	—	—		Non-album singles
2010	"What Do You Want" (with Jesus Luz)	Damae	—	—	—	—	—	—	—	—	—	—		Non-album singles
2011	"Oops Sorry"	Damae	—	—	—	—	—	—	—	—	—	—		Non-album singles
2011	"Everytime You Need Me 2011"	Damae	—	—	—	—	—	—	—	—	—	—		Non-album singles
2011	"What Love Can Do" (with Plastik Funk)	Damae	—	—	—	—	—	—	—	—	—	—		Non-album singles
2011	"Insane (In Da Brain)" (with DJs from Mars)	Damae	—	—	—	—	—	—	—	—	—	—		Non-album singles
2012	"Thousand Times"	Damae	—	—	—	—	—	—	—	—	—	—		Non-album singles
2012	"Where Do We Go" (with Akil Wingate)	Akil Wingate; Damae	—	—	—	—	—	—	—	—	—	—		Non-album singles
2015	"Toca Me" (Twoloud remix)	Eva Martinez	—	—	—	—	—	—	—	—	—	—		
2021	"I Want More"	Tess	—	—	—	—	—	—	—	—	—	—		
