= DJs from Mars =

Italian DJ and production team

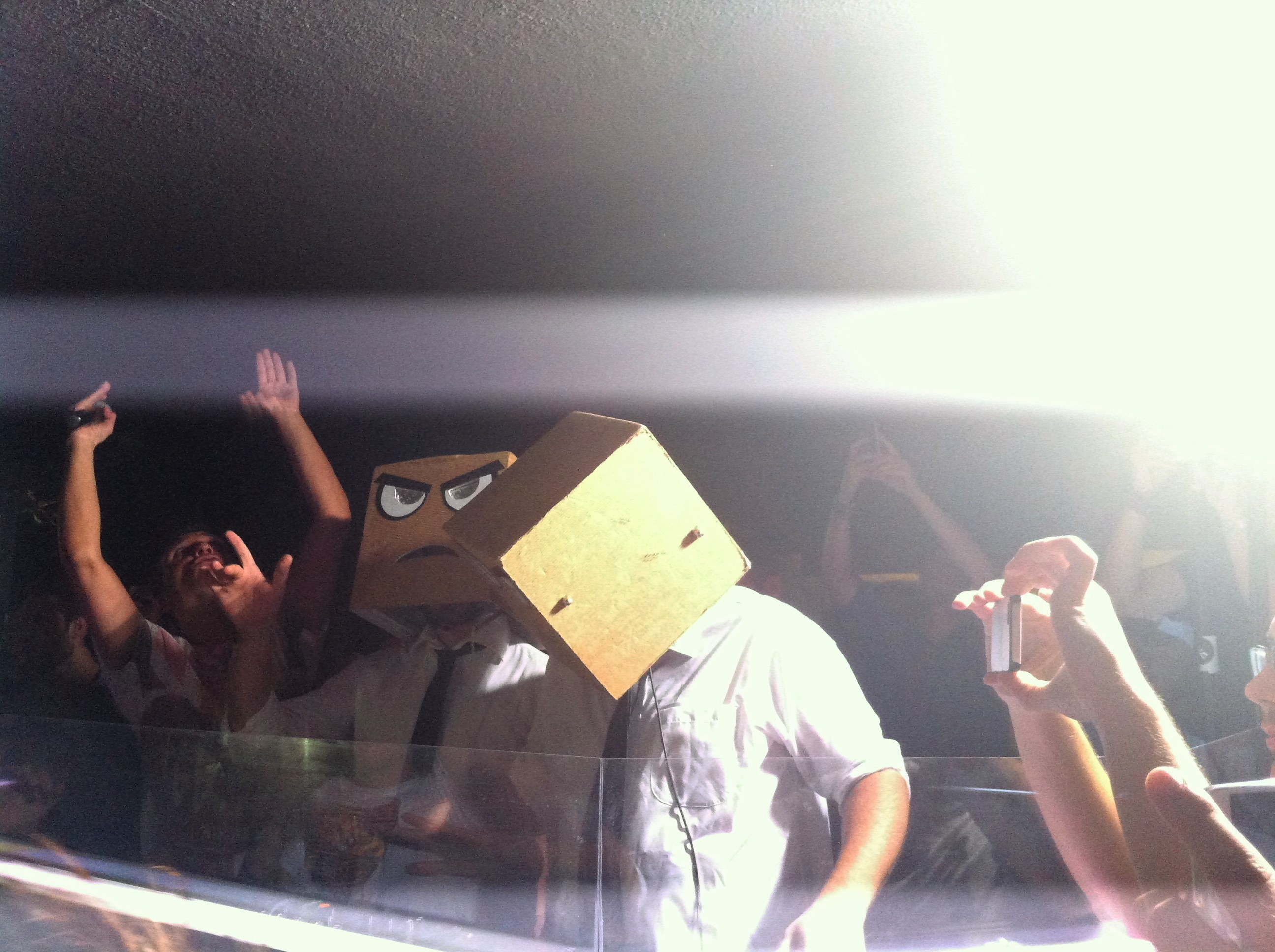

Background information
- Origin: Turin, Piedmont, Italy
- Occupation(s): Record producers, DJs, remixers
- Labels: Dance and Love
- Website: www.djsfrommars.com

DJs from Mars is an Italian DJ and production team. They are known for their mashups of popular songs turned into electronic dance music.

== Background ==
The project started in 2003 after the meeting of young producers Luca Emanuele Ventrafridda (aka Luca Ventafunk) and Massimiliano Garino (aka Max Aqualuce), in Bliss Corporation, an Italian label famous for the project of Eiffel 65 in the late 1990s. Both of them were producing songs for the label under different nicknames. It was only after a few years and several tracks together that they initiated the common project "DJs from Mars".

With the help of their American manager Jason Nevins, DJs from Mars produced official remixes for multiple artists, including Sean Paul, Pitbull, Sophie Ellis Bextor, Dirty Vegas, Fragma, Ciara, Coolio, and Ennio Morricone.

In 2013, DJs from Mars were ranked 95 in DJ Mag's list of Top 100 DJs.

In 2015, they are featured as main characters in the Gillette advertising campaign “Shave Forth”.

== Recognition ==
Lady Gaga featured their bootlegs of "Metallica vs Lady Gaga" on Twitter. Their productions are frequently featured on YouTube, as well. The duo received over 10 million views on their channel, and reached the 100.000 fans mark on their Facebook fan page in May 2012. As of 2022, they are mostly active on Instagram.

== DJ career ==
Famous for wearing cardboard boxes on their heads while playing live, they performed at a number of night clubs and events over the world including Europe, USA, Brazil, Dominican Republic, Canada, and China. They opened for Tiesto in Atlantic City in March 2011. In 2022 they played the Tomorrowland Mainstage.

== Discography ==
=== Albums ===
- Alien Nation Vol.1 (2010)
- Bootfellas (2010)
- Alien Nation Vol.2 (2011)
- Bootfellas Vol.2 (2011)
- Bootzilla (2013)
- Bootzilla: Vol. 2 (2014)
- Bootzilla: Vol. 3 (2015)
- Bootzilla: Vol. 4 (2018)
- Bootzilla: Vol. 5 (2022)

=== Singles and EPs ===
- 2003
  - Non Dormo Più - (Bliss Corporation)
- 2004
  - Open Sesame - (Movimental)
  - Kipo Mambo (Mama Made a Disco Groove)
- 2007
  - The Motherfucker - (GreenPark)
- 2008
  - Who Gives A Fuck About Deejays - (The Dominion)
  - Dirty Mary (My Name Is)
  - Saturday Night On The Moon
- 2009
  - Suono & Immagine
  - Don't Give Up
  - Revolution Radio - as db Pure vs. Djs From Mars
- 2010
  - Luv 2 Like It - as Rico Bernasconi vs. Djs From Mars
  - Club Bizarre - as Brooklyn Bounce vs. Djs From Mars
- 2011
  - Sex Bass & Rock 'n' Roll 2k11 - Brooklyn Bounce vs. Djs From Mars
  - Can't Come Home - as Picco vs. Djs From Mars
  - Que Pasa - as Gabry Ponte + Djs From Mars + Bellani & Spada
- 2012
  - Insane (In Da Brain) - as Djs From Mars featuring Fragma
  - Phat Ass Drop (How To Produce A Club Track Today)
- 2013
  - Rock'N'Roll
- 2014
  - Welcome To The Darkside - as Djs From Mars vs. David Puentez
  - Hardcore Vibes - as Djs From Mars vs. Picco
  - Devil In My Brain - as Djs From Mars vs. Carnival featuring James F. Dini
  - Unconditional Symphony -as Djs From Mars vs. The Urban Love
  - The Night Rave Before Christmas EP
- 2015
  - Raving Bad EP
- 2016
  - Stronger - with Luca Testa featuring Becko
  - Back In The Classics EP
  - Bootylicious EP
- 2017
  - Decks & Drops & Rock'n'Roll
- 2018
  - Somewhere Above The Clouds
  - Harlem (Bronski Beat)
  - Gam Gam
  - Christmas Pack
- 2019
  - The Spring Break Bootleg Pack
  - The Summer Bangerz EP
  - The Unforgettable EP
- 2020
  - The Drop - with Tiësto, Rudeejay and Da Brozz
  - Summer 2020 Bootleg Pack
  - All I Want For Christmas Is Groove Bootleg Pack
- 2021
  - Sunday Morning (Controversia)
  - Call It House - with Laidback Luke
  - Sunglasses At Night - as Djs From Mars featuring JD Davis
  - Summer On Mars Bootleg Pack
- 2022
  - Killing Me Softly - with Gabry Ponte
  - Christmas In The Club Bootleg EP
- 2023
  - Blue Monday - with Oliver Heldens featuring JD Davis
  - Summer Festival Bootleg Pack
  - Don't Stop - with Tujamo
  - Loneliness - with Hardwell and Tomcraft
  - State Of Euphoria - with Laidback Luke

== DJ Magazine Top 100 DJs ==
Year	Peak position	Notes	Ref.
2013	95	New Entry	
2014	106	Exit (Down 11)	
2015	111	Out (Down 5)	
