= Carmine Meo =

1997 single by Emma Shapplin

Studio album by Emma Shapplin
- Released: December 7, 1997
- Genre: Classical crossover
- Label: EMI
- Producer: Jean-Patrick Capdevielle

Emma Shapplin chronology
Carmine Meo (1997)	Etterna (2002)

Professional ratings
Review scores
Source	Rating
AllMusic	3.5/5 stars

Carmine Meo is the debut album by French soprano Emma Shapplin, released on 7 December 1997. The album brought Shapplin worldwide attention, selling over two million copies and being certified multi-platinum.

== Track listing ==
No.	Title	Length
1.	"De l'Abîme au Rivage..."
2.	"Spente le Stelle"
3.	"Vedi, Maria..."
4.	"Carmine Meo"
5.	"Cuor Senza Sangue"
6.	"Favola Breve"
7.	"Reprendo Mai Più..."
8.	"Une Ombre Dans le Ciel"
9.	"Lucifero, Quel Giorno..."
10.	"Ira Di Dio"
11.	"Miserere, Venere..."
12.	"À la Frontière du Rêve..."

=== Bonus tracks ===
No.	Title	Length
13.	"Dolce Veneno"
14.	"Fera Ventura"
15.	"Discovering Yourself"
16.	"Falta Tu Estrella (Spanish version of "Spente le Stelle")"
17.	"Cuerpo Sin Alma (Spanish version of "Cuor Senza Sangue")"

== Personnel ==
- Yaël Benzaquen - Vocal Coach
- Virginie Borgeaud - Management
- Michel DeFolligne - Collaboration, Coordination
- Chistopher Deschamps - Drums
- Régis Dupré - Brass Conductor, Conductor, String Conductor
- Vic Emerson - Artistic Director, Choir/Chorus, Orchestral Arrangements
- Alix Ewald - Assistant Engineer, Engineer, Mixing Assistant
- Patrice Kung - Mixing
- Bertrand Lajudie - Piano
- Carina Landehag - Make-Up
- Jean Yves Legrand - Engineer
- André Perriat - Mastering
- Vincent Perrot - Bass
- Emma Shapplin - Liner Notes, Primary Artist
- Mariana Yotoya - Choir Conductor
- Jean-Patrick Capdevielle - Songwriter

== Charts ==
=== Weekly ===
Chart (1997–2000)	Peak position
Belgian Albums (Ultratop Flanders)	10
Belgian Albums (Ultratop Wallonia)	2
Canada Top Albums/CDs (RPM)	49
Dutch Albums (Album Top 100)	2
Finnish Albums (Suomen virallinen lista)	19
French Albums (SNEP)	9
Greek Albums (IFPI Greece)	1
Italian Albums (FIMI)	43
New Zealand Albums (RMNZ)	9
Norwegian Albums (VG-lista)	17
Portuguese Albums (AFP)	8
Swedish Albums (Sverigetopplistan)	24
UK Classical Artist Albums (OCC)	6

=== Year-end ===
Chart (1998)	Position
Belgian Albums (Ultratop Flanders)	40
Belgian Albums (Ultratop Wallonia)	13
Dutch Albums (Album Top 100)	12
European Top 100 Albums (Music & Media)	82
French Albums (SNEP)	45
Italian Albums (FIMI)	199
New Zealand Albums (RMNZ)	34

Chart (1999)	Position
Dutch Albums (Album Top 100)	14
New Zealand Albums (RMNZ)	33

== Certifications ==
Region	Certification	Certified units/sales
Argentina (CAPIF)	Platinum	60,000^{^}
Belgium (BRMA)	Platinum	50,000^{*}
Canada (Music Canada)	Platinum	100,000^{^}
Chile	Gold	
Greece (IFPI Greece)	Gold	30,000^{^}
France (SNEP)	2× Gold	200,000^{*}
Israel	3× Platinum	120,000
Netherlands (NVPI)	Platinum	100,000^{^}
New Zealand (RMNZ)	Platinum	15,000^{^}
Portugal (AFP)	Gold	20,000^{^}
Spain (Promusicae)	Gold	50,000^{^}
Turkey (Mü-Yap)	2× Platinum	20,000^{*}
Summaries
Europe (IFPI)	Platinum	1,000,000^{*}
^{*} Sales figures based on certification alone.^{^} Shipments figures based on certification alone.
