= Ramon Zenker =

- Born: 11 November 1968 (age 57)
- Origin: Meerbusch, Germany
- Genres: Electronic; trance; house
- Occupations: Electronic musician; record producer; songwriter; remixer; record label owner
- Instrument: Synthesizer
- Years active: 1989–present
- Labels: Kontor Records, Soundness Records, Tiger Records, Lo:Go Recordings, Gang Go Music, BMG, WEA Records, Virgin Records, Intercord, Dance Street, Orbit Records
- Member of: Fragma; Paffendorf; E-Trax; Hardfloor; Bellini

Ramon Zenker (born 11 November 1968) is a German music producer, songwriter, sound engineer and remixer. He is a member of Hardfloor, Fragma, Paffendorf and E-Trax, who had a UK #60 hit with Let's Rock.

Zenker started playing keyboards and bass guitar at the age of 12, although synthesizers soon became his main interest. Zenker has released music under various names and is still today involved in many projects. This includes chart successes with acts such as Bellini, Fragma and Paffendorf, as well as lesser known "non-commercial" projects such as Interactive, Hardfloor and Da Damn Phreak Noize Phunk.

== Notable works ==
- Interactive - Who is Elvis (1991)
- Hardfloor - Acperience 1 (1993)
- Interactive - Forever Young (1994)
- Perplexer - Acid Folk (1994)
- Celvin Rotane – I Believe (1995)
- Mylène Farmer - L'Instant X (Remix) (1995)
- Mylène Farmer - California (Remix) (1996)
- Bellini - Samba de Janeiro (1997)
- Paffendorf - Where Are You? (1999)
- Fragma - Toca Me (1999) and Toca's Miracle (2000)
- Fragma - Everytime You Need Me (2000)
- Fragma - You Are Alive (2001)
- Paffendorf - Be Cool (2001)
- Paffendorf - Lalala Girl (2006)
- Ayumi Hamasaki - You (Remix) (2011)
