= Radikal Records =

American independent record label

Radikal Records is a Teaneck, New Jersey–based independent record label launched in 1990 by Jurgen Korduletsch for the purpose of introducing European dance, techno, rave and trance music to the United States. Radikal has released a "who's who" of European dance royalty and continues to sign and release electronic music, some pop music, and many compilation albums. Many of their artists and releases were and are licensed from all over the world for exclusive release in North America. Radikal Records sells their releases via their company website, all major music retailers, and all major music download sites. All of their current releases can be sampled through the website. Currently, in-print releases are distributed in the United States by RED Distribution.

== Notable artists ==
- 2 Unlimited
- 4 Clubbers
- 4 Strings
- Afrika Bambaataa
- Agnelli & Nelson
- Alex Party
- André Tanneberger
- Antoine Becks
- Apollo 440
- Armin van Buuren
- Audio Playground
- Ayah Marar
- Bart Claessen
- Black Duck
- Blank & Jones
- Bombs Away
- Bonnie Anderson
- Brooklyn Bounce
- Claudja Barry
- Cosmic Gate
- Cygnus X
- Da Hool
- Dannic
- Dannii Minogue
- Digital Underground
- DJ Aligator Project
- DJs from Mars
- Energy 52
- Fargetta
- George Kranz
- Gloria Gaynor
- I.O.U.
- Jason Nevins
- Juliet Roberts
- Junior Jack
- Kamaliya
- Kingsland Road
- Klubbheads
- Kristian Nairn
- Lucas Nord
- Mad'House
- Marc et Claude
- Marc Maris
- Matt Cardle
- Mauro Picotto
- MC Mario
- Mellow Trax
- Milk & Sugar
- N-Trance
- Paffendorf
- Playahitty
- Pulsedriver
- Ralphie Dee
- Rozalla
- Schiller
- Scooter
- Sinéad O'Connor
- Snap!
- Sunscreem
- Tony Moran
- The Underdog Project
- U96 / Wolfgang Flür
- Voodoo and Serano
- Wideboys
- Yello
- Zombie Nation
