= Stefan Gödde =

German television presenter (born 1975)

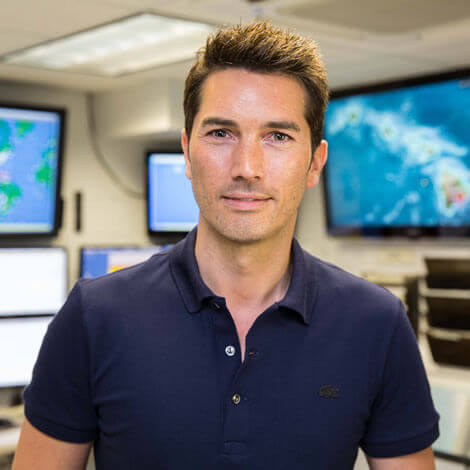
- Gödde during filming of Galileo spezial in Hawaii
- Born: 12 December 1975 (age 49); Paderborn, West Germany (now Germany)
- Occupation(s): Television presenter, journalist
- Years active: 1996–present

Stefan Gödde (born 12 December 1975) is a German television presenter and journalist.

== Biography ==
Gödde grew up in Rüthen (Soest), where he attended the Friedrich-Spee-School and completed his Zivildienst. After his Abitur in 1995, he studied German studies and English studies at the University of Paderborn and on the Aston University in Birmingham. His first state exam on teaching in Secondary I and II, he finished in December 2001.

Gödde's television career began in August 2002 as Dominik Bachmair's successor as host of the business show BIZZ on ProSieben. He then co-hosted the tabloid show taff with Annemarie Warnkross from 2005 to 2009. Since March 2009, he has presented the ProSieben show Galileo, alternating weekly with Aiman Abdallah. His reports from Chernobyl and North Korea attracted particular attention.

== Filmography ==
Television presenter (Host)
Year	Title	Channel	Notes
2002–2005	BIZZ	ProSieben	
2003–2004, 2008	taff spezial	ProSieben	
2005–2009	taff	ProSieben	
2006	Stars auf Eis	ProSieben	
2008	The next Uri Geller – Unglaubliche Phänomene Live	ProSieben	
2009	Das grosse Kipp Roll Fall Spektakel	ProSieben	Co-Host
2009	Uri Geller Live: Ufos und Aliens – Das unglaubliche TV-Experiment	ProSieben	
2009 – present	Galileo	ProSieben	in the weekly change with Aiman Abdallah
2009 – present	Galileo Spezial	ProSieben	
2010	Galileo Green Seven Day	ProSieben	
2010	Crazy Competition	ProSieben	
2011–2012	The Voice of Germany	ProSieben & Sat.1	

Reporter
Year	Title	Channel	Notes
2005	Golden Globes 2005	ProSieben	in Los Angeles
2005	OSCAR-Verleihung 2005	ProSieben	in Los Angeles
2009	Galileo Big Pictures – Die 50 spektakulärsten Bilder des Jahres 2009	ProSieben	in Wales
2009	Exclusive Interview with Tom Hanks	-	

Radio presenter
Year	Radio	Notes
1991–2001	Hellweg Radio	
1991–2001	Radio NRW	
