= Bellini discography =

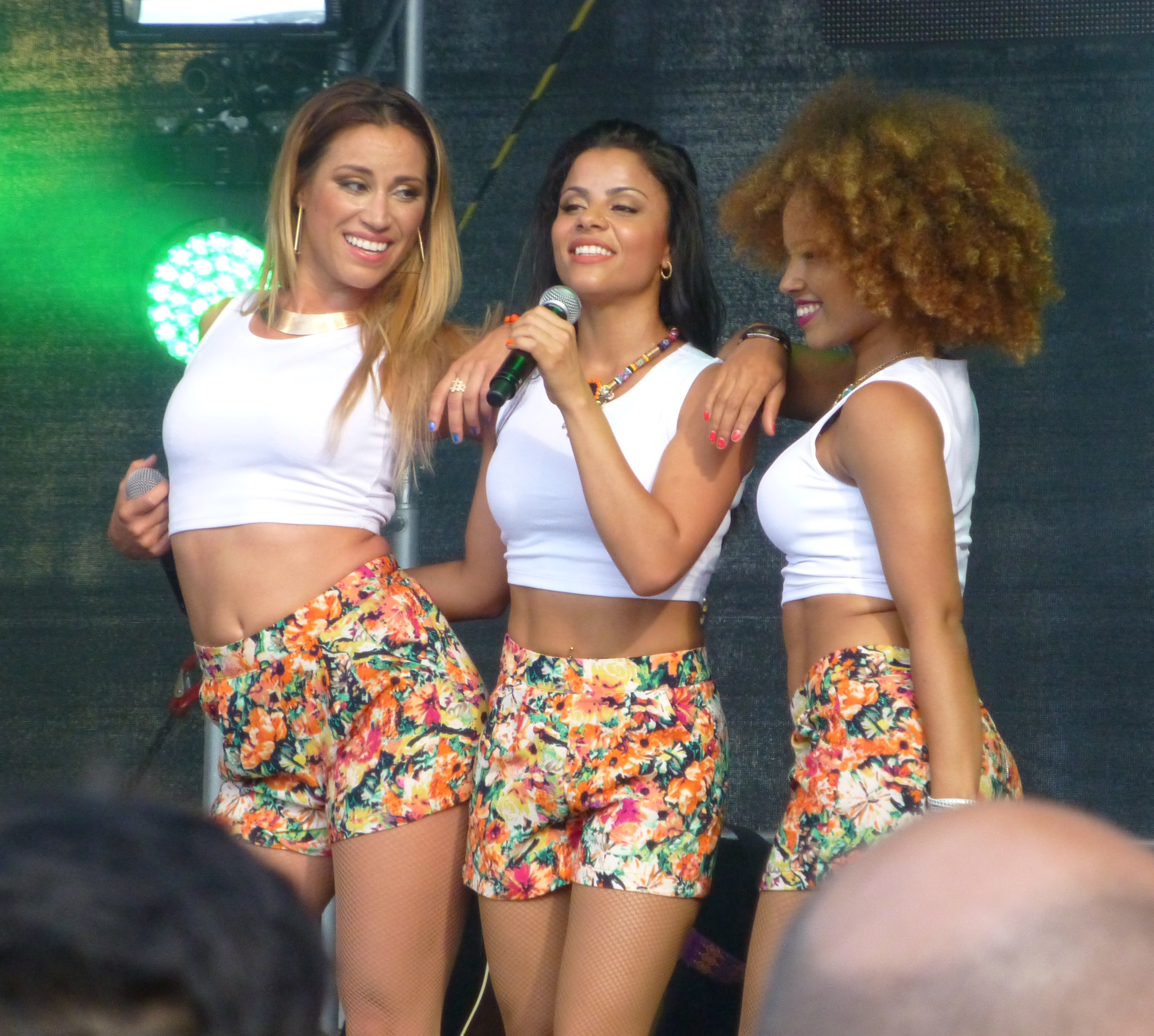
- Bellini at Saarbrücken in 2014
- Studio albums: 2
- Compilation albums: 2
- Singles: 11
- Music videos: 11
- Promotional singles: 2

The discography of Bellini, a German pop group, consists of two studio albums, two compilation albums, 11 singles, including 1 as featured artist, 2 promotional singles and 11 music videos. The first Bellini release was the debut studio album Samba de Janeiro in 1997, preceded by the massive chart hit of the same name "Samba de Janeiro", which heavily samples Airto Moreira's 1972 song "Tombo In 7/4" from his album Fingers, also released in 1997. This release was followed with the compilation album Samba de Janeiro – Non-Stop Best of Bellini and the sophomore studio album Festival in 2001 and 2014.

== Albums ==
=== Studio albums ===
List of studio albums with chart positions
Year	Title	Chart Positions		
Year	Title	GER	AUT	SUI
1997	Samba de Janeiro	63	26	47
2014	Festival	—	—	—

=== Compilation albums ===
List of compilation albums with chart positions
Year	Title	Chart Positions		
Year	Title	GER	AUT	SUI
2001	Samba de Janeiro – Non-Stop Best of Bellini	—	—	—
2002	Brazil – The best of Bellini	—	—	—

== Singles ==
List of singles with chart positions and album name
Year	Title	Chart Positions				Album
Year	Title	GER	AUT	SUI	ITA	Album
1997	"Samba de Janeiro"	2	3	2	—	Samba de Janeiro
1997	"Carnaval"	93	—	—	—	Samba de Janeiro
1998	"Me Gusta la Vida"	79	30	46	—	Samba de Janeiro – Non-Stop Best of Bellini
1999	"Saturday Night"	—	—	—	—	Samba de Janeiro – Non-Stop Best of Bellini
2000	"Samba de Amigo"	—	—	—	—	Samba de Janeiro – Non-Stop Best of Bellini
2000	"Arriba Allez"	—	—	—	—	Brazil – The best of Bellini
2001	"Brazil (en Fiesta)"	71	—	79	—	Brazil – The best of Bellini
2004	"Tutti Frutti"	—	—	78	—	Pura Vida Ibiza
2007	"Let's Go to Rio"	99	—	—	—	Festival
2014	"Samba do Brasil"	—	—	—	78	Festival

=== Promotional singles ===
List of promotional singles with chart positions and album name
Year	Title	Chart Positions			Album
Year	Title	GER	AUT	SUI	Album
2008	"Hot, Hot, Hot"	—	—	—	N.A.
2010	"Samba All Night"	—	—	—	N.A.

=== Featured singles ===
List of singles with chart positions and album name
Year	Title	Chart Positions			Album
Year	Title	GER	AUT	SUI	Album
2004	"Magalenha" (Mendonça Do Rio & Bellini)	—	—	—	N.A.

== Music videos ==
Year	Title	Director(s)
1997	"Samba de Janeiro"	
1997	"Carnaval"	
1998	"Me Gusta la Vida"	
2001	"Brazil (en Fiesta)"	
2004	"Tutti Frutti"	
2014	"Samba do Brasil"	
2014	"Tic, Tic Tac" (Note: The music video of "Tic, Tic Tac" has been released as part of a promotional video medley. The full music video remains unreleased.)	
2014	"Outro Lugar" (Note: The music video of "Outro Lugar" has been released as part of a promotional video medley. The full music video remains unreleased.)	
2014	"Festa" (Note: The music video of "Festa" has been released as part of a promotional video medley. The full music video remains unreleased.)	
2014	"Mas Que Nada" (Note: The music video of "Mas Que Nada" has been released as part of a promotional video medley. The full music video remains unreleased.)	
2014	"Brazil" (Note: The music video of "Brazil" has been released as part of a promotional video medley. The full music video remains unreleased.)	
