= Zachary Lagha =

Canadian ice dancer (born 1999)

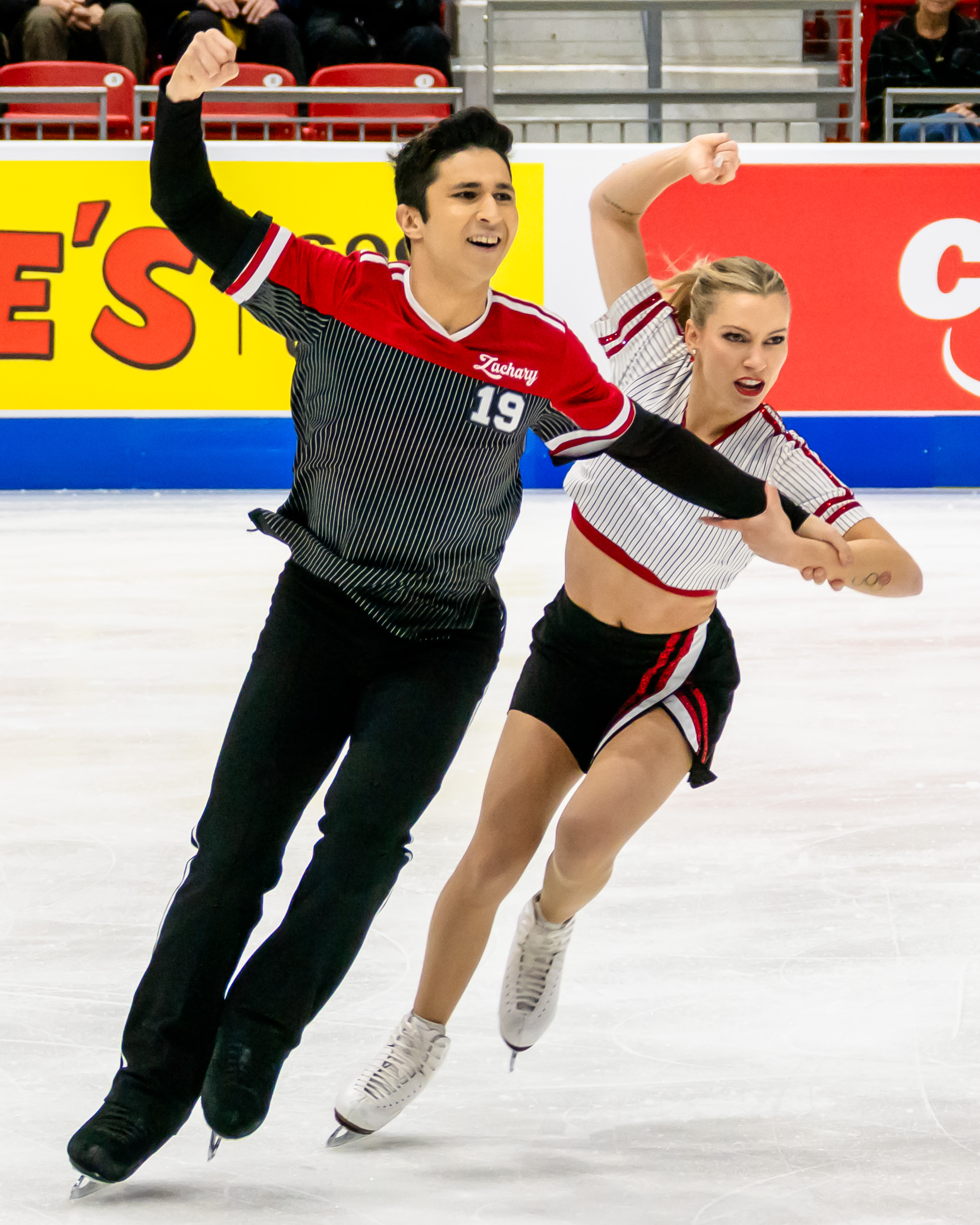
- Marjorie Lajoie and Zachary Lagha during their rhythm dance at 2025 Skate America

Personal information
- Born: April 15, 1999 (age 27) Greenfield Park, Quebec, Canada
- Home town: Saint-Hubert, Quebec
- Height: 1.72 m (5 ft 8 in)

Figure skating career
- Country: Canada
- Discipline: Ice dance
- Partner: Hannah Lim (since 2026); Marjorie Lajoie (2011–2026)
- Coach: Romain Haguenauer; Marie-France Dubreuil; Pascal Denis; Patrice Lauzon; Josée Piche
- Skating club: CPA St.-Lambert
- Began skating: 2004

Medal record
Four Continents Championships
Bronze medal – third place	2023 Colorado Springs	Ice dance
Bronze medal – third place	2025 Seoul	Ice dance
Canadian Championships
Silver medal – second place	2020 Mississauga	Ice dance
Silver medal – second place	2023 Oshawa	Ice dance
Silver medal – second place	2025 Laval	Ice dance
Bronze medal – third place	2022 Ottawa	Ice dance
Winter Youth Olympics
Bronze medal – third place	2016 Lillehammer	Team
World Junior Championships
Gold medal – first place	2019 Zagreb	Ice dance

Zachary Lagha (born April 15, 1999) is a Canadian ice dancer, who currently competes with Hannah Lim.

With his former skating partner Marjorie Lajoie, he is a two-time Four Continents bronze medallist (2023, 2025), a seven-time Grand Prix medallist, 2022 CS Nepela Memorial champion, 2022 CS Budapest Trophy champion, and a five-time Canadian national medallist. Lajoie and Lagha represented Canada at the 2022 and 2026 Winter Olympics.

Lajoie and Lagha began their careers with a string of domestic titles in the youth ranks, including gold medals at the 2015 Canadian Novice Championships and 2015 Canada Winter Games, before making their international junior debut. They won four medals on the ISU Junior Grand Prix, three national junior titles, and became the second Canadian dance team to win the World Junior Championships in 2019. They represented Canada at the 2016 Winter Youth Olympics, finishing fourth in the dance event and winning a bronze medal in the team event.

== Personal life ==
Lagha was born on April 15, 1999, in Greenfield Park, Quebec, Canada. His family is of Algerian Canadian heritage. His mother, Fella Hammoutene, is an accomplished pianist and encouraged her son to study piano as well. Lagha enters musical competitions in the skating off-season. In June 2018, he won a scholarship after winning the first round and getting to the final at the prestigious Canadian Music Competition.

Currently a student in contemporary dance at Concordia University, he identified coaching as his planned vocation following the end of his competitive career.

He is fluent in English and French.

== Skating career ==
=== Partnership with Marjorie Lajoie ===
==== Early years ====
Lagha began learning to skate in 2004. He formed an ice dance partnership with Marjorie Lajoie in 2011, coached by Julien Lalonde, Mylène Girard, and Valérie Allard in Saint-Hubert, Quebec.

After winning the national pre-novice title in the 2013–14 season, they moved up to the novice level for 2014–15. They won the silver medal at the Skate Canada Challenge, and then took the gold medal at the 2015 Canadian Championships. Lagha said of the achievement: "We worked very hard for this. It came with work. No work. No results." The following month they competed at the 2015 Canada Winter Games, winning the gold medal.

==== 2015–2016 season: Junior debut ====
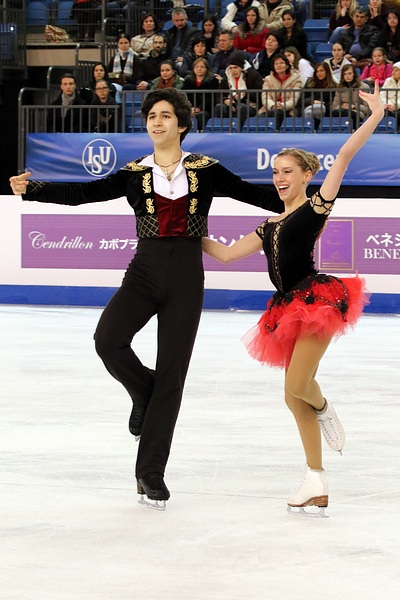
Lajoie and Lagha at the 2016 World Junior Championships≤

Following their novice title win, the two ended their partnership, later stating that they had different ideas at the time. Subsequently Lagha transferred to train with Marie-France Dubreuil, who encouraged them to reunite in the summer of 2015. They then moved to train with Dubreuil, Patrice Lauzon, Romain Haguenauer, and Pascal Denis in Montreal, Quebec.

Making their junior international debut on the Junior Grand Prix, Lajoie and Lagha finished seventh at the JGP Spain in early October. Lajoie said that it "went super well, and I didn’t expect us to do this well."

In January 2016, Lajoie and Lagha were awarded the junior silver medal at the Canadian Championships after placing fourth in the short dance and second in the free dance. The following month, they placed fourth at the 2016 Winter Youth Olympics in Norway. Lajoie called it "a super fun competition," while Lagha thought "we didn't get the scores we wanted but what's most important is the public and ourselves were satisfied with the performance." Competing as members of Team Discovery, they also won bronze medals in the team event. In March, they ranked eleventh in the short dance, thirteenth in the free dance, and thirteenth overall at the 2016 World Junior Championships in Hungary.

==== 2016–17 season: First junior national title ====
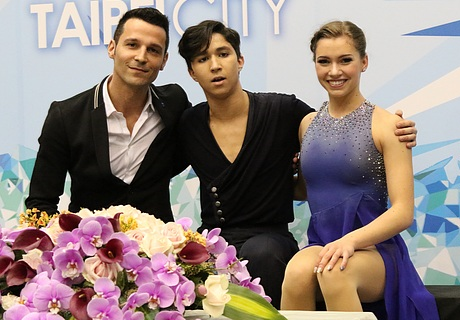
Lajoie (right) and Lagha (center) with coach Romain Haguenauer (left) at the 2017 World Junior Championships

Lajoie and Lagha were given two assignments on the 2016–17 Junior Grand Prix series, first finishing fourth at the JGP Japan in Yokohama. They set a new personal best and Lajoie said that they felt they were "on the right track." At the JGP Germany in Dresden, they finished third in the short dance segment, but dropped off the podium following the free dance, missing the bronze medal by less than a point. Lajoie admitted that it was "unfortunate we couldn’t have placed higher," while vowing "there’s still a lot of work to do in order to increase our scores even more."

At the 2017 Skate Canada Challenge, Lajoie and Lagha broke the Canadian record in junior ice dance, held since 2005 by Tessa Virtue and Scott Moir. They went on to win the junior national title at the 2017 Canadian Championships.

In advance of the 2017 World Junior Championships, Lajoie and Lagha were sent to compete at the Bavarian Open in February. They won the silver medal, finishing only 0.02 points behind the gold medalists. In March, they placed fifth in the short dance, seventh in the free dance, and sixth overall at the World Junior Championships in Taipei.

==== 2017–18 season: Second junior national title ====
Lajoie and Lagha opened the 2017–18 Junior Grand Prix series with a silver medal win at the JGP Australia event in Brisbane. This was their first career medal on the circuit, but Lagha insisted that "when you start focusing on results, it never works. We just wanted to do well and build from here because we know we can do better." They went on to win gold at JGP Croatia in Zagreb, setting new personal bests in the short dance and combined total score. These results qualified them for the Junior Grand Prix Final in Nagoya, Japan. Lajoie sustained a concussion and a hip injury due to a fall in practice. After a month of recuperating, she returned to training two weeks before the Junior Grand Prix Final, where the duo placed sixth.

Lajoie and Lagha defended their junior national title at the 2018 Canadian Championships, breaking their own Canadian record. They closed out the season at the 2018 World Junior Championships in Sofia, Bulgaria. They placed second in the short dance, earning a silver small medal, but placed fifth in the free dance, placing them narrowly off the podium in fourth place. Lajoie commented: "The free dance went super well for us. We were in the moment and managed the stress. We achieved our goal by being in the mix for a spot on the podium."

==== 2018–19 season: Junior World title ====
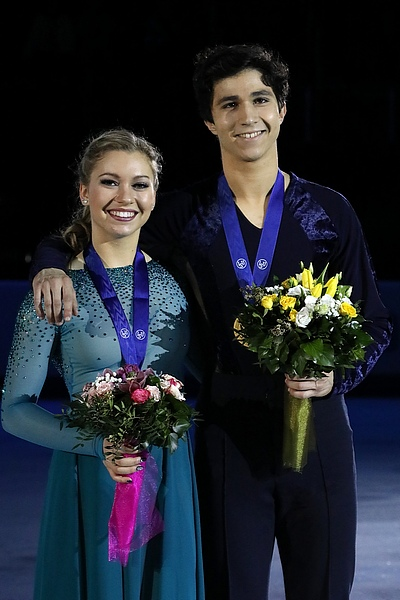
Lajoie and Lagha during the medal ceremony at the 2019 World Junior Championships

Lajoie and Lagha began the 2018 JGP series at the JGP Austria event in Linz, winning the silver medal. The team's choreographic character step sequence was ruled invalid, costing them points. Lajoie expressed dissatisfaction with the performance, stating, "the presentation was good, but there’s a lot of work to do at the technical level." They won the gold at the JGP Canada, scoring personal bests in both segments, again breaking the junior Canadian record, and qualifying for their second Junior Grand Prix Final. At the Final, Lajoie and Lagha placed fourth, 0.03 points behind bronze medalists Elizaveta Khudaiberdieva and Nikita Nazarov, following a one-point deduction for an extended lift.

At the 2019 Canadian Championships, Lajoie and Lagha won their third consecutive junior title: a national record. Their margin over silver medalists Alicia Fabbri and Paul Ayer was 21.14 points. As a "test run" for the World Junior Championships, Lajoie and Lagha then competed at the 2019 Bavarian Open, an event where they had won silver two seasons prior, this time winning gold, 24.7 points ahead of silver medalists Fabbri and Ayer.

Concluding the season at the 2019 World Junior Championships, Lajoie and Lagha placed first in the rhythm dance, setting a new junior world record of 70.14. They were awarded a gold small medal for the result. They then won the free dance as well, setting new world records for that segment and for the total score, winning the World Junior title.

==== 2019–20 season: Senior debut ====
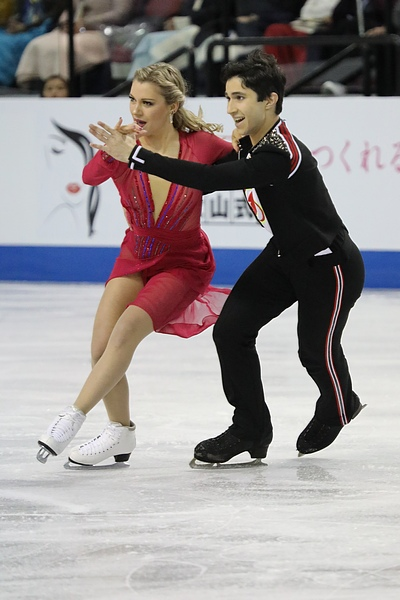
Lajoie and Lagha make their Grand Prix debut at the 2019 Skate Canada International

Lajoie/Lagha began their senior career with two Challenger events. They placed seventh at the 2019 CS Lombardia Trophy, which Lajoie described as a disappointment following twizzle errors by her in the free dance. They next came fourth at the 2019 CS Finlandia Trophy, missing the podium by less than two points due to an invalidated choreographic character step. Despite that, Lajoie called the result "a big step up for us." Making their senior Grand Prix debut at the 2019 Skate Canada International, they placed seventh in the rhythm dance and then moved up to sixth following the free dance. Competing at the 2019 Rostelecom Cup, they placed seventh after struggles in the rhythm dance.

With training mates and presumptive silver medallists Fournier Beaudry/Sørensen sitting out the 2020 Canadian Championships, Lajoie/Lagha competed with Soucisse/Firus for the silver medal. Both teams made errors in the rhythm dance, with Lagha bobbling on his twizzle sequence, but they nevertheless placed second in the rhythm dance. Clean in the free dance, but for Lagha stumbling in a choreographic sequence, they were second in that segment as well and won the silver medal, earning assignments to both the Four Continents Championships and the World Championships in their home town of Montreal.

Competing at Four Continents in Seoul, Lajoie/Lagha placed fifth in the rhythm dance with a new personal best score of 76.43, an increase of over five points internationally. They unexpectedly placed ahead of American national bronze medallists Hawayek/Baker, who fell out of their lift. They placed behind Hawayek/Baker in the free dance but remained in fifth place overall, again recording significant improvements in their free dance and total scores. Lagha said afterwards, "there was not one time this season yet when we skated without any major mistakes. Even at nationals, there were some stumbles, but now we finally did two good performances."

Though scheduled to make their World Championship debut, this was prevented by the cancellation of the Montreal World Championships due to the COVID-19 pandemic. Both reported being disappointed, but Lajoie added, "our season before this was very good, so it’s not the end of the world."

==== 2020–21 season: Worlds debut ====
Lajoie/Lagha were assigned to the 2020 Skate Canada International, but this event was also cancelled due to the pandemic.

With the pandemic continuing to make holding in-person competitions difficult domestically, Lajoie/Lagha made their competitive debut at a virtually-held 2021 Skate Canada Challenge, where they placed third in both segments to take the bronze medal. The 2021 Canadian Championships were subsequently cancelled.

On February 25 Lajoie/Lagha were announced as part of the Canadian team for the 2021 World Championships, their senior World Championship debut following the earlier cancellation of the 2020 World Championships. They placed fourteenth in Stockholm.

==== 2021–22 season: Beijing Olympics ====
Lajoie and Lagha made their season debut at the 2021 CS Autumn Classic International, where they placed fourth. At their second Challenger event, the 2021 CS Finlandia Trophy, they came seventh in a very competitive field. On the result, Lajoie said, "in the end, we were quite happy about it."

On the Grand Prix at the 2021 Skate Canada International, the first Canadian competition with an audience in over a year and a half, Lajoie/Lagha placed sixth. Lagha said afterwards, "we didn't get the score and placement we wanted, but the standing ovation was great!" At their second Grand Prix, the 2021 NHK Trophy in Tokyo, they placed fifth, including a fourth-place finish in the free dance.

Competing at their second senior Canadian championships, held in Ottawa without an audience due to restrictions prompted by the Omicron variant, Lajoie/Lagha placed third in the rhythm dance. They were third in the free dance as well, despite Lajoie flubbing a twizzle set and won the bronze medal. She said afterwards, "every element we did, there was a little something; we were struggling, and we are not used to that." They nevertheless were pleased with the result. The following day they were named to the Canadian Olympic team.

Lajoie/Lagha placed thirteenth in the rhythm dance at the 2022 Winter Olympics dance event. Scott Moir, commentating on the segment, called them "the team that we're all going to be watching in 2026." They remained thirteenth after the free dance, with Lajoie saying, "I think we did a pretty good job, especially because it’s such a stressful environment." They concluded the season at the 2022 World Championships in Montpellier, with the International Skating Union banning all Russian athletes due to their country's invasion of Ukraine. Lajoie/Lagha finished thirteenth in the rhythm dance, a disappointing result, but rose to eleventh overall with a tenth-place free dance.

==== 2022–23 season: Four Continents bronze, Challenger and Grand Prix success ====
In the first of two Challenger assignments, Lajoie/Lagha won gold at the 2022 CS Nepela Memorial, their first international senior medal and title. Lagha considered their effort "O.K. for a first skate despite a little mistake. We don't want to do mistakes anymore." Weeks later at the 2022 CS Budapest Trophy, they set a new set of personal bests, clearing 80 points in the rhythm dance, 120 points in the free dance, and 200 points in total score, all for the first time. Lagha said he remained unsatisfied with the free dance performance, which he considered "a bit too safe."

On the Grand Prix at the 2022 Skate Canada International, Lajoie/Lagha were fourth in the rhythm dance after errors put them narrowly behind Americans Green/Parsons. In the free dance, they overtook Green/Parsons for the bronze medal, their first on the senior Grand Prix. Two weeks later, they won a second bronze medal at the 2022 MK John Wilson Trophy in Sheffield. They had spent the intervening time working on their twizzle element, which had given the issues at their first Grand Prix event, and said they were pleased with the resulting performance.

With defending national champions Gilles/Poirier absent from the 2023 Canadian Championships due to Gilles requiring an appendectomy, the national ice dance title was considered more open than previously, to which Lagha remarked "we try not to focus on that, but we can always dream right?" They finished second in the rhythm dance, narrowly behind training partners Fournier Beaudry/Sørensen. They won the free dance after Fournier Beaudry/Sørensen botched their closing element, but remained narrowly second overall by 0.60 points and won their second national silver. Lajoie said afterward that it had been a "mental fight" for both of them that day, "but, we did it." As Canada had only two berths at the 2023 World Championships due to Gilles/Poirier and Fournier Beaudry/Sørensen's ordinals the prior year, Lajoie/Lagha were assigned only to compete at the 2023 Four Continents Championships.

With Gilles/Poirier absent as well from the Four Continents Championships, Lajoie/Lagha were considered challengers for the podium. Despite low step sequence levels, they placed third in the rhythm dance, 2.07 points clear of fourth-place Carreira/Ponomarenko, while expected rivals Green/Parsons were a distant fifth after Parsons fell. They were third in the free dance as well with a new personal best score of 120.96, for a total score of an even 200.00 points. They won the bronze medal, their first ISU championship medal at the senior level. Lagha called the result "the cherry on top of a perfect season," with Lajoie noting "we have a podium finish in every competition" that they had entered.

==== 2023–24 season: Injury and home World Championships ====
Lagha suffered a shoulder injury in May 2023, hindering their preparations for the 2023–24 season, further complicated by subsequent back strain. Lajoie would later say "we kind of didn't have an off season." To fit the 1980s rhythm dance theme, they settled on Michael Jackson's "Thriller," Lagha citing Jackson as one of his favourite singers. Wanting to use a Montreal artist for their free dance, in celebration of the World Championships being held in their home city that year, they eventually settled on "Roses", a piece by local pianist Jean-Michel Blais.

The team was initially assigned to the 2023 CS Autumn Classic International, but withdrew. They were able to participate in their second Challenger assignment, the 2023 CS Nepela Memorial, coming fifth. Lajoie said that "we will take the situation how it is and will work from here." They first appeared on the Grand Prix at the 2023 Skate America, where they placed second in the rhythm dance, 0.60 points clear of French training mates Lopareva/Brissaud in third, despite getting only a level 1 on the midline step. They were second in the free dance as well, winning their first Grand Prix silver. At the 2023 Cup of China, they unexpected won the rhythm dance over pre-event favourites and fellow Canadians Gilles/Poirier after the latter had a twizzle error. They placed second in the free dance, and second overall. Lagha said afterward that it "was a struggle at the beginning of the season, as I had a few injuries. But we handled it like professionals and came ready for the Grand Prix."

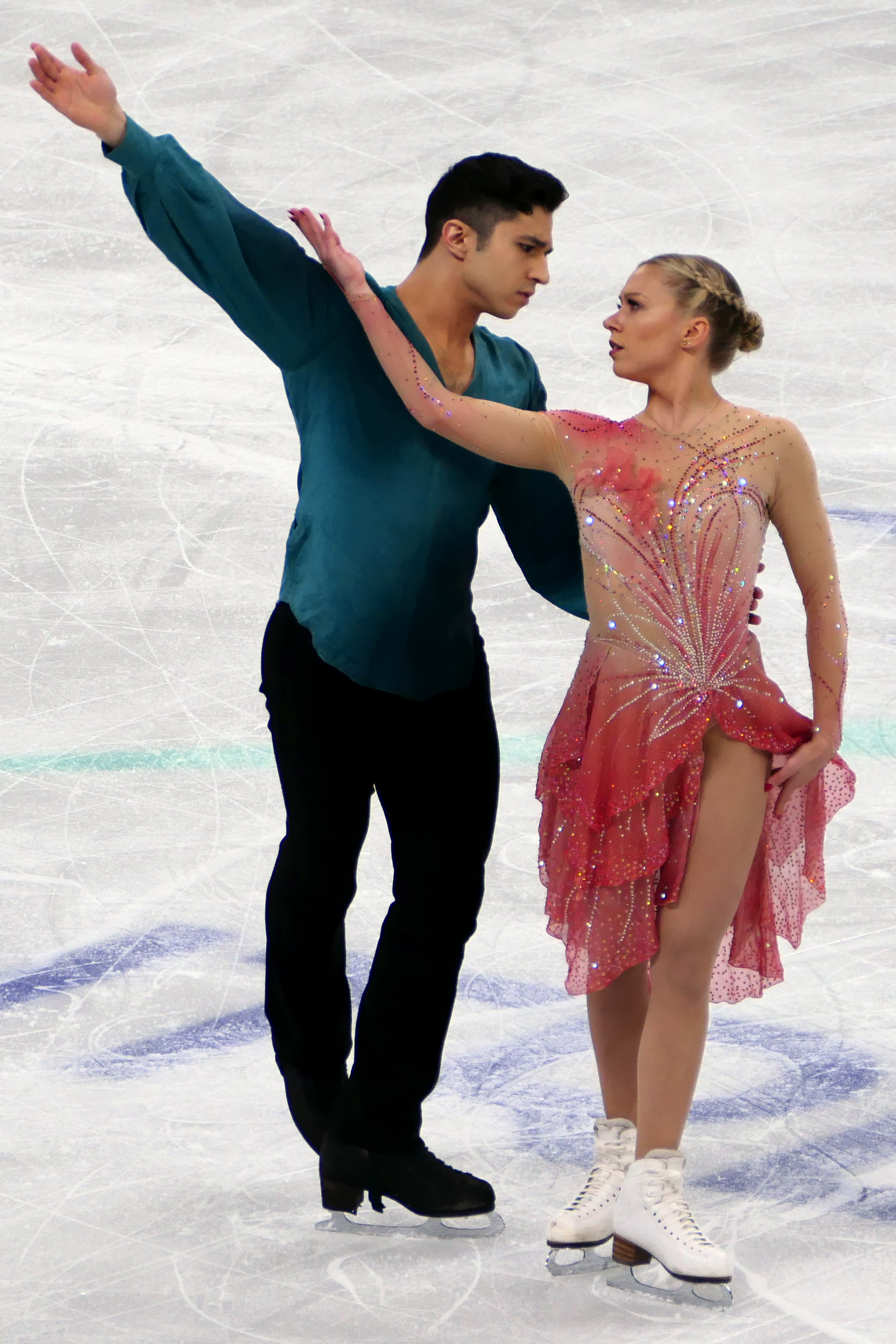
Lajoie and Lagha during their free dance at the 2024 World Championships

The team's results qualified them to their first senior Grand Prix Final, held in Beijing, where they came sixth. Lagha described it as "a new experience to skate first and only with the best of the best." The team was unable to compete at the Canadian Championships after Lajoie was placed in concussion protocol. They subsequently withdrew from the 2024 Four Continents Championships as well. Lajoie was sidelined from training from months during recovery. Lagha continued to train by himself in the interim.

Lajoie was able to resume training for their hometown World Championships, having received full clearance from her physicians a week beforehand. They placed an unexpected fifth in the rhythm dance, following errors by fellow Canadians Fournier Beaudry/Sørensen, and thus skated in the final flight of the free dance for the first time. Lajoie/Lagha were fifth in that segment as well, setting new personal bests in all categories, and finished fifth overall. They called the result their proudest moment of the season. Lagha concluded that "we still have work to do and we're just going to focus on that. If the judges want to put us on top, they will. We're just going to continue our performances and let the world appreciate what we're doing, hopefully."

==== 2024–25 season: Second Four Continents bronze ====
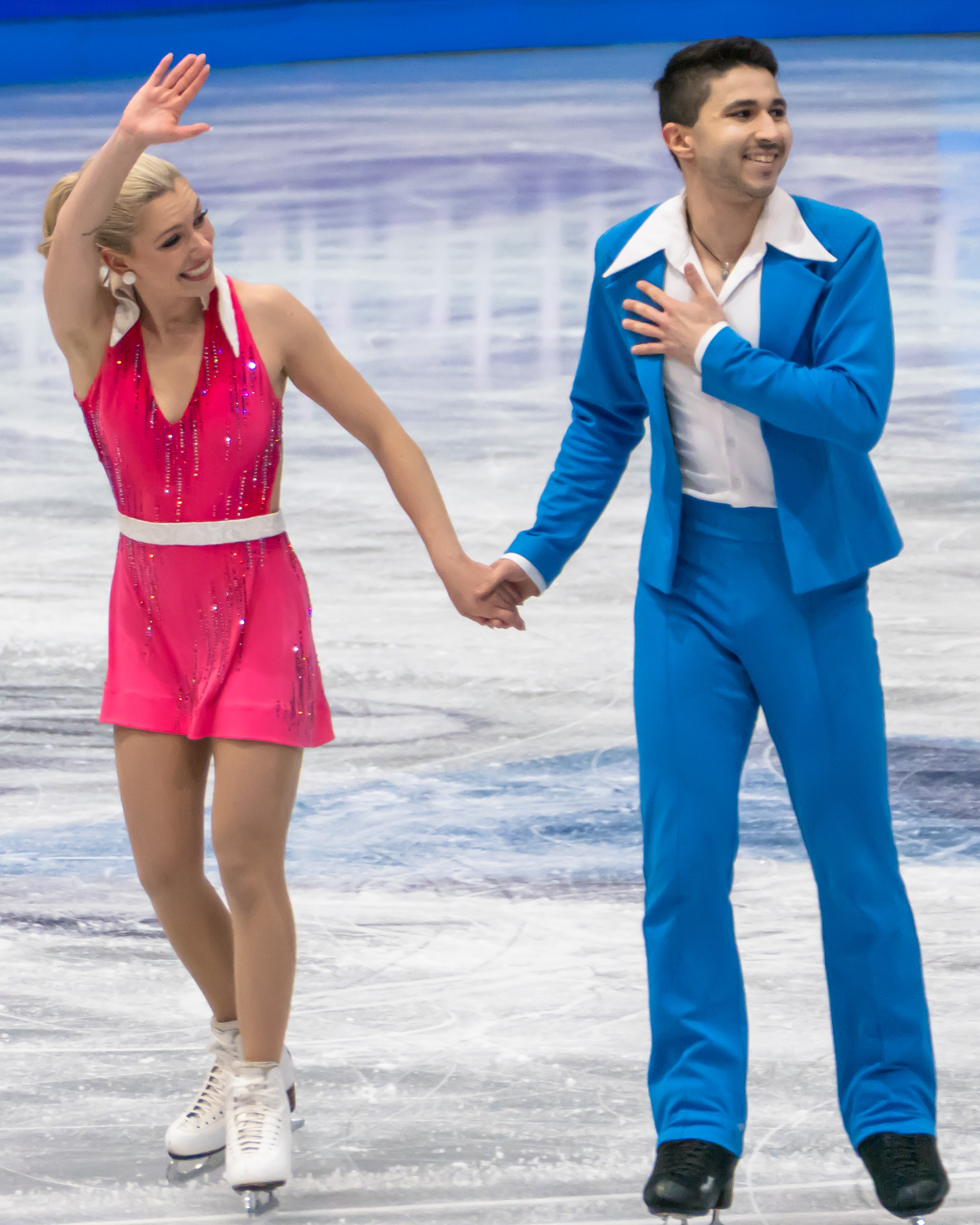
Lajoie/Lagha following their rhythm dance at the 2025 World Championships

With the rhythm dance theme for the season being "Social Dances and Styles of the 1950s, 1960s and 1970s," the team opted to reprise a theme they had used at the pre-novice level in the 2013–14 season, the Austin Powers franchise. Lajoie explained that they "did it when we were 12 years old, so it's good memories for us." Their free dance used the Disturbed cover of Simon & Garfunkel's "The Sound of Silence".

In early September, Lajoie suffered a concussion in training after being accidentally elbowed in the head by Lagha. Due to this injury, they withdrew from both of their Challenger assignments, the 2024 CS Nebelhorn Trophy and the 2024 CS Budapest Trophy.

After missing two weeks of training, they returned to the ice in a "slow and deliberate" manner, and were able to compete at their first Grand Prix assignment, the 2024 Skate Canada International in Halifax. Lagha fell in the rhythm dance, but they still finished second in the segment as it had not been on a technical element. Lajoie remarked that she had fallen in the same part of the program in practices, and said they would revise the choreography afterward. They went on to finish second in the free dance as well, taking the silver medal. Lagha would later reveal that he had discovered his skates had been over-sharpened.

They went on to win a second silver medal at the 2024 Cup of China. Their results qualified them for the 2024–25 Grand Prix Final in Grenoble. At the Final, Lajoie/Lagha finished an unexpected fourth, narrowly defeating Canadian champions Piper Gilles and Paul Poirier for the first time after the latter had a fall in the rhythm dance.

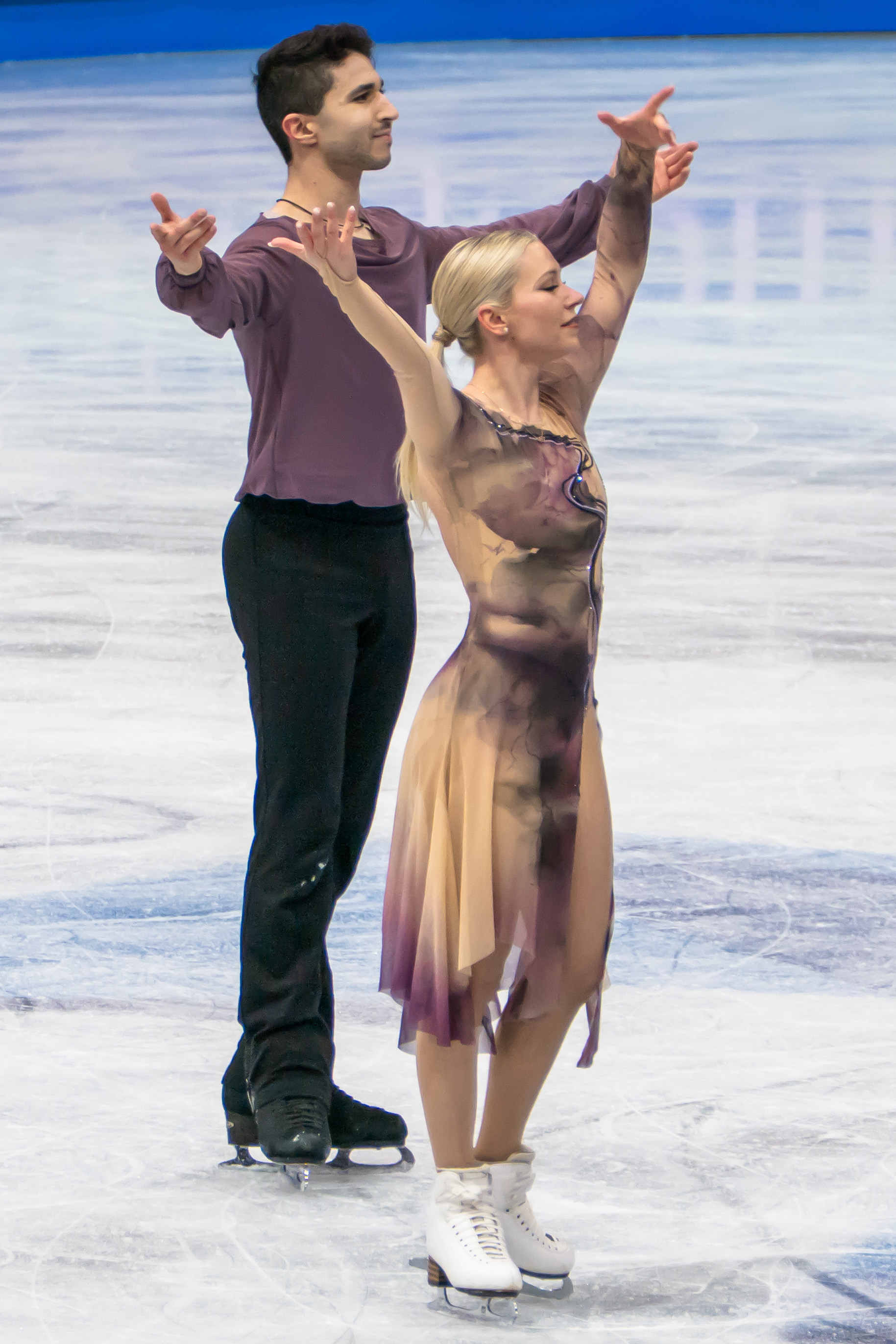
Lajoie/Lagha performing their free dance at the 2025 World Championships

Lajoie/Lagha returned to the podium at the 2025 Canadian Championships, claiming their fourth senior national medal and third silver.

At the 2025 Four Continents Championships, Lajoie/Lagha finished third in the rhythm dance with a new personal best score of 82.86 points. Lagha changed his costume for the program, explaining that the Austin Powers look was "more like the movie theme, not social dance, and we have to follow the rules. Also, it gives a more mature look." In the free dance, Lajoie flubbed her second twizzle set, but they remained in third place in the segment, and won the bronze medal overall. She said she was "not very happy about my performance, but in general, it was a very, very, very good week."

Lajoie/Lagha concluded their season at the 2025 World Championships in Boston, Massachusetts, United States, where they came fifth in the rhythm dance, despite a lost twizzle level. In the free dance they placed eighth, dropping to seventh overall. Both expressed disappointment in this placement. Lagha remarked that "All I feel right now is that I really want to go back to work. I want to improve everything, our skating skills, our connection with each other, and technically, just everything. I really just want to get back to training."

==== 2025–26 season: Milano Cortina Olympics ====
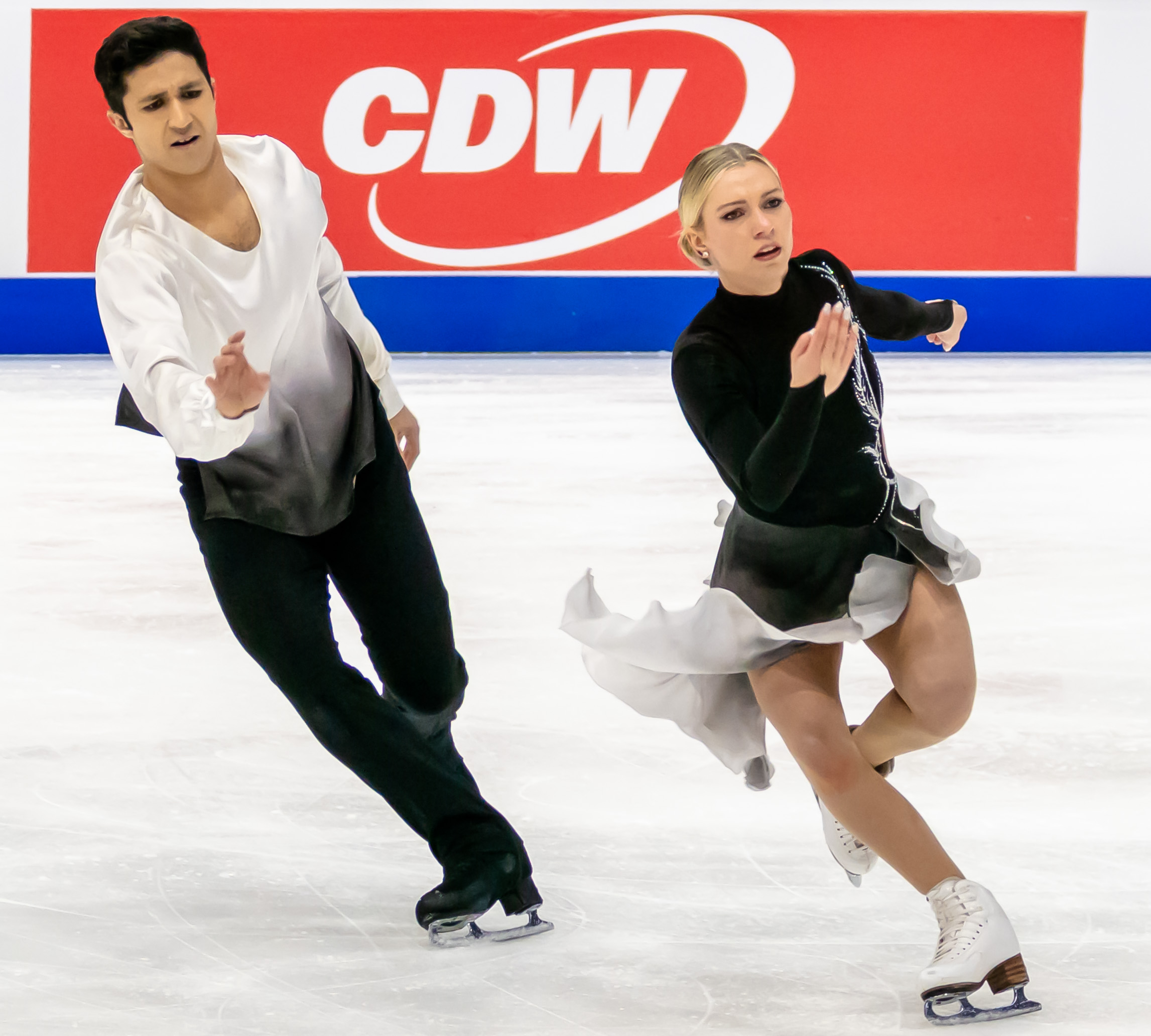
Lajoie and Lagha performing their free dance at 2025 Skate America

Lajoie/Lagha opened their season in early October by winning gold at the 2025 Budapest Trophy.

Later that month, they went on to place third at 2025 Skate Canada International, edging out USA's Christina Carreira and Anthony Ponomarenko for the bronze. “Today felt very good. We were really connected and enjoyed the moment,” said Lajoie after the Free Dance. “The crowd was amazing, so it really helped to enjoy the performance." However, Lagha was irked by the "exclamation" points they received in the protocols for their performances.

Two weeks later, the team took silver at 2025 Skate America. “We’re very proud and happy with our skate and the result,” said Lajoie after the free dance. “It means a lot for us to finish second here. We worked really hard in between Skate Canada and Skate America."

In January, Lajoie/Lagha competed at the 2026 Canadian Championships, winning the silver medal behind Gilles/Poirier. "It went very well," said Lagha after the free dance. "We were very nervous. The training was going so well and we really wanted to like give a good performance to the crowd and our coaches, and for ourselves too. So, I'm really happy about how we managed to deal with the nerves again." They were subsequently named to the 2026 Winter Olympic team.

On 7 February, Lajoie/Lagha partook in the 2026 Winter Olympics Figure Skating Team Event, competing in the free dance segment. They placed third and earned a season's best score. "It felt really good!" said Lajoie after their performance. "Really, when before we went out, we realized, ‘oh my God, it’s the Olympics! But the feeling when the music started was pretty amazing."

On 9 February, Lajoie/Lagha placed ninth in the rhythm dance segment of the individual ice dance event. Two days later, they placed ninth in the free dance and finishing in tenth place overall. "We love this sport," said Lajoie after their free dance. "We do it because we love it. At the same time, the scores are not something we can control. That’s why we say the best reward is the crowd—and today we had the crowd. We can be proud of ourselves."

The following month, Lajoie/Lagha competed at the 2026 World Championships in Prague, Czech Republic. The team placed eighth in the rhythm dance and tenth in the free dance to finish in ninth place overall.

On 11 May, Lajoie announced the end of her partnership with Lagha via Instagram. Lagha confirmed the news on 12 May, writing, "After 15 incredible years, Marjorie and I have decided to end our partnership as our paths are now taking us in different directions. For all these years passed together, I would like to thank you, Marjorie, for the wonderful journey. Thank you for always being in a good mood during training, for your kindness, and for being supportive every time I needed it. I wish you all the best for the coming years from the bottom of my heart."

=== Partnership with Hannah Lim ===
==== 2026–27 season ====
In June 2026, Lagha announced that he had formed a new partnership with Canadian-South Korean ice dancer, Hannah Lim. Due to Lim's transfer from the Korean Skating Union to the Skate Canada, the duo would not be eligible for international competition in the 2026–27 season.

== Programs ==
=== Ice dance with Marjorie Lajoie ===
Season	Rhythm dance	Free dance	Exhibition
2025–2026	Get Ready for This by 2 Unlimited; The Power by Snap!; ¡Olé! by The Bouncing Souls choreo. by Romain Haguenauer; Get Ready for This by 2 Unlimited; Are You Ready; Thunderstruck by AC/DC; ¡Olé! by The Bouncing Souls choreo. by Romain Haguenauer	Nureyev (from The White Crow) by Ilan Eshkeri performed by Lisa Batiashvili choreo. by Romain Haguenauer, Ginette Cournoyer	
2024–2025	Soul Bossa Nova by Quincy Jones & His Orchestra; Shining Star by Earth, Wind & Fire; Boogie Wonderland by Earth, Wind & Fire ft. The Emotions choreo. by Romain Haguenauer	The Sound of Silence by Simon & Garfunkel performed by Disturbed; Murky Solitude by Karl Hugo choreo. by Romain Haguenauer	Thriller by Michael Jackson choreo. by Romain Haguenauer, Ginette Cournoyer
2023–2024	Thriller by Michael Jackson choreo. by Romain Haguenauer, Ginette Cournoyer	Roses by Jean-Michel Blais arranged by Karl Hugo choreo. by Romain Haguenauer, Ginette Cournoyer	Let's Cha Cha by Cha Cha MC; Mas que nada by Jorge Ben performed by Bellini; Samba de Janeiro by Bellini choreo. by Romain Haguenauer, Ginette Cournoyer
2022–2023	Cha Cha: Let's Cha Cha by Cha Cha MC; Samba: Mas que nada by Jorge Ben performed by Bellini; Samba: Samba de Janeiro by Bellini choreo. by Romain Haguenauer, Ginette Cournoyer	Nureyev (from The White Crow) by Ilan Eshkeri performed by Lisa Batiashvili choreo. by Romain Haguenauer, Ginette Cournoyer	Funkytown by Lipps Inc.; Super Solid Soul Vehicle by Tom McGuire & The Brassholes; Far from Over by Frank Stallone choreo. by Romain Haguenauer, Ginette Cournoyer
2021–2022	Funk: Funkytown by Lipps Inc.; Blues: Super Solid Soul Vehicle by Tom McGuire & The Brassholes; Disco: Far from Over by Frank Stallone choreo. by Romain Haguenauer, Ginette Cournoyer	Real in Rio; Locked Up; Bird Fight (from Rio) by John Powell choreo. by Romain Haguenauer, Ginette Cournoyer	Maybe I Maybe You by Scorpions
2020–2021	Swing: Prologue; Quickstep: Dance at the Gym; Swing: America (from West Side Story) by Leonard Bernstein choreo. by Romain Haguenauer, Marie-France Dubreuil, Ginette Cournoyer	Real in Rio; Locked Up; Bird Fight (from Rio) by John Powell choreo. by Romain Haguenauer, Ginette Cournoyer	
2019–2020	Swing: Prologue; Quickstep: Dance at the Gym; Swing: America (from West Side Story) by Leonard Bernstein choreo. by Romain Haguenauer, Marie-France Dubreuil, Ginette Cournoyer	Bohemian Rhapsody by Queen choreo. by Romain Haguenauer, Marie-France Dubreuil, Ginette Cournoyer	Radioactive by Imagine Dragons
2018–2019	Tango: Perro Viejo; Tango: Otro Puente Alsina; Tango: Essa by Otros Aires choreo. by Romain Haguenauer	Warsaw Concerto by Richard Addinsell choreo. by Romain Haguenauer	Maybe I Maybe You by Scorpions
	Short dance		
2017–2018	Cha cha: Bla Bla Bla Cha Cha Cha by Petty Booka; Samba: Tu Picadura by Gary Tesca	Dream by Imagine Dragons; Nemesis by Benjamin Clementine	Blues: Shoppin' for Clothes by The Coasters; Swing: Land of a Thousand Dances by Wilson Pickett
2016–2017	Blues: Shoppin' for Clothes by The Coasters; Swing: Land of a Thousand Dances by Wilson Pickett	Rhapsody on a Theme of Paganini by Sergei Rachmaninoff	
2015–2016	Waltz: Gramophone by Eugen Doga; Polka: Furioso by Johann Strauss II	Pas de Deux Kitri and Basilio; Quiteria's Variation; Classical Variation I; Pas de Deux Kitri and Basilio V. Coda (from Don Quixote) by Ludwig Minkus	
2014–2015	La Virgen de la Macarena by Bernardino Monterde	Pas de Deux Kitri and Basilio; Quiteria's Variation; Classical Variation I; Pas de Deux Kitri and Basilio V. Coda (from Don Quixote) by Ludwig Minkus	
2013–2014		Austin Powers: International Man of Mystery by George S. Clinton; Soul Bossa Nova by Quincy Jones	Stayin' Alive; You Should Be Dancing by Bee Gees
2011–2012		Carmen by Georges Bizet performed by Nana Mouskouri	

== World record scores ==
Combined total records
Disc.	Segment	Score	Event	Date	Ref.
Ice dance	Rhythm dance	70.14	2019 World Junior Championships	March 7, 2019	
Ice dance	Free dance	105.96	2019 World Junior Championships	March 9, 2019	
Ice dance	Combined total	176.10	2019 World Junior Championships	March 9, 2019	

== Competitive highlights ==
=== Ice dance with Marjorie Lajoie ===
- GP – Event of the ISU Grand Prix Series
- JGP – Event of the ISU Junior Grand Prix Series
- CS – Event of the ISU Challenger Series
- TBD – Assigned
- WD – Withdrew from competition
- C – Event was cancelled

Competition placements at senior level
Season	2019–20	2020–21	2021–22	2022–23	2023–24	2024–25	2025–26
Winter Olympics			13th				10th
Winter Olympics (Team event)							5th
World Championships	C	14th	11th		5th	7th	9th
Four Continents Championships	5th			3rd		3rd	
Grand Prix Final					6th	4th	
Canadian Championships	2nd	C	3rd	2nd		2nd	2nd
GP Cup of China					2nd	2nd	
GP NHK Trophy			5th				
GP Rostelecom Cup	7th						
GP Skate Canada	6th		6th	3rd		2nd	3rd
GP Skate America					2nd		2nd
GP Wilson Trophy				3rd			
CS Autumn Classic			4th				
CS Budapest Trophy				1st			
CS Finlandia Trophy	4th		7th				
CS Lombardia Trophy	7th						
CS Nepela Memorial				1st	5th		
Budapest Trophy							1st
Skate Canada Challenge		3rd					

Competition placements at junior level
Season	2015–16	2016–17	2017–18	2018–19
Youth Winter Olympics	4th			
Youth Winter Olympics (Team event)	3rd			
World Junior Championships	13th	6th	4th	1st
Junior Grand Prix Final			6th	4th
Canadian Championships	2nd	1st	1st	1st
JGP Australia			2nd	
JGP Austria				2nd
JGP Canada				1st
JGP Croatia			1st	
JGP Germany		4th		
JGP Japan		4th		
JGP Spain	7th			
Bavarian Open		2nd		1st
Skate Canada Challenge	2nd	1st		

== Detailed results ==
=== Ice dance with Marjorie Lajoie ===
ISU personal best scores in the +5/-5 GOE System
Segment	Type	Score	Event
Total	TSS	208.01	2024 World Championships
Rhythm dance	TSS	82.86	2025 Four Continents Championships
Rhythm dance	TES	47.64	2022 CS Budapest Trophy
Rhythm dance	PCS	35.67	2025 Four Continents Championships
Free dance	TSS	125.71	2024 World Championships
Free dance	TES	71.15	2024 World Championships
Free dance	PCS	54.56	2024 World Championships

ISU personal bests in the +3/-3 GOE System (from 2010–11)
Segment	Type	Score	Event
Total	TSS	150.30	2017 JGP Croatia
Short dance	TSS	62.89	2017 JGP Croatia
Short dance	TES	33.35	2017 JGP Croatia
Short dance	PCS	29.81	2018 World Junior Championships
Free dance	TSS	87.47	2017 World Junior Championships
Free dance	TES	43.50	2017 World Junior Championships
Free dance	PCS	46.43	2017 JGP Croatia

- Small medals for the short program and free skating are only awarded at ISU Championships.

==== Senior level ====
Results in the 2019–20 season
Date	Event	RD		FD		Total	
Date	Event	P	Score	P	Score	P	Score
Sep 13–15, 2019	(Italy) 2019 CS Lombardia Trophy	5	67.94	7	97.77	7	165.71
Oct 11–13, 2019	(Finland) 2019 CS Finlandia Trophy	4	70.75	4	102.94	4	173.69
Oct 25–27, 2019	2019 Skate Canada International	7	70.50	6	107.87	6	177.53
Nov 15–17, 2019	(Russia) 2019 Rostelecom Cup	8	64.70	7	105.20	7	169.90
Jan 13–19, 2020	(Canada) 2020 Canadian Championships	2	77.26	2	121.66	2	198.92
Feb 4–9, 2020	(South Korea) 2020 Four Continents Championships	5	76.43	6	115.68	5	192.11

Results in the 2020–21 season
Date	Event	RD		FD		Total	
Date	Event	P	Score	P	Score	P	Score
Jan 8–17, 2021	2021 Skate Canada Challenge	3	81.58	3	118.84	3	200.42
Mar 22–28, 2021	(Sweden) 2021 World Championships	14	72.00	13	108.71	14	180.71

Results in the 2021–22 season
Date	Event	RD		FD		Total	
Date	Event	P	Score	P	Score	P	Score
Sep 16–18, 2021	(Canada) 2021 CS Autumn Classic International	4	71.27	4	110.47	4	181.74
Oct 7–10, 2021	(Finland) 2021 CS Finlandia Trophy	7	71.93	7	109.10	7	181.03
Oct 29–31, 2021	2021 Skate Canada International	6	71.87	6	107.20	6	179.07
Nov 12–14, 2021	(Japan) 2021 NHK Trophy	5	74.45	4	112.93	5	187.38
Jan 6–12, 2022	(Canada) 2022 Canadian Championships	3	76.67	3	116.00	3	192.67
Feb 12–14, 2022	(China) 2022 Winter Olympics	13	72.59	13	108.43	13	181.02
Mar 21–27, 2022	(France) 2022 World Championships	13	70.39	10	108.45	11	178.84

Results in the 2022–23 season
Date	Event	RD		FD		Total	
Date	Event	P	Score	P	Score	P	Score
Sep 29 – Oct 1, 2022	(Slovakia) 2022 CS Nepela Memorial	1	75.79	1	117.56	1	193.35
Oct 13–16, 2022	(Hungary) 2022 CS Budapest Trophy	1	82.09	1	120.31	1	202.40
Oct 28–30, 2022	2022 Skate Canada International	4	75.94	3	119.55	3	195.49
Nov 11–13, 2022	(United Kingdom) 2022 MK John Wilson Trophy	3	81.09	3	117.86	3	198.95
Jan 9–15, 2023	(Canada) 2023 Canadian Championships	2	84.91	1	126.89	2	211.80
Feb 7–12, 2023	(United States) 2023 Four Continents Championships	3	79.04	3	120.96	3	200.00

Results in the 2023–24 season
Date	Event	RD		FD		Total	
Date	Event	P	Score	P	Score	P	Score
Sep 28–30, 2023	(Slovakia) 2023 CS Nepela Memorial	5	70.00	5	109.18	5	179.18
Oct 20–22, 2023	(United States) 2023 Skate America	2	77.80	2	119.19	2	196.99
Nov 10–12, 2023	2023 Cup of China	1	82.02	2	124.00	2	206.02
Dec 7–10, 2023	(China) 2023–24 Grand Prix Final	6	74.74	6	118.89	6	193.63
Mar 18–24, 2024	(Canada) 2024 World Championships	5	82.30	5	125.71	5	208.01

Results in the 2024–25 season
Date	Event	RD		FD		Total	
Date	Event	P	Score	P	Score	P	Score
Oct 25–27, 2024	2024 Skate Canada International	2	77.34	2	122.56	2	199.90
Nov 22–24, 2024	2024 Cup of China	2	81.53	2	123.63	2	205.16
Dec 5–8, 2024	(France) 2024–25 Grand Prix Final	4	77.73	5	122.11	4	199.84
Jan 14–19, 2025	(Canada) 2025 Canadian Championships	2	86.42	1	132.10	2	218.52
Feb 19–23, 2025	(South Korea) 2025 Four Continents Championships	3	82.86	3	118.18	3	201.04
Mar 26–30, 2025	(United States) 2025 World Championships	5	81.77	8	118.64	7	200.41

Results in the 2025–26 season
Date	Event	RD		FD		Total	
Date	Event	P	Score	P	Score	P	Score
Oct 10–12, 2025	(Hungary) 2025 Budapest Trophy	1	79.16	1	121.97	1	201.13
Oct 31 – Nov 2, 2025	2025 Skate Canada International	4	75.95	3	116.46	3	192.41
Nov 14–16, 2025	(United States) 2025 Skate America	2	77.42	2	119.74	2	197.16
Jan 5–11, 2026	(Canada) 2026 Canadian Championships	2	86.93	2	130.39	2	217.32
Feb 6–8, 2026	(Italy) 2026 Winter Olympics – Team event	—N/a	—N/a	3	120.90	5	—N/a
Feb 9–11, 2026	(Italy) 2026 Winter Olympics	9	79.66	9	120.14	10	199.80
Mar 24–29, 2026	(Czech Republic) 2026 World Championships	8	80.81	10	118.25	9	199.06

==== Junior level ====
Results in the 2015–16 season
Date	Event	SD		FD		Total	
Date	Event	P	Score	P	Score	P	Score
Sep 30 – Oct 3, 2015	2015 JGP Spain	7	52.50	6	77.41	7	129.91
Dec 2–6, 2015	2016 Skate Canada Challenge	3	53.16	2	78.32	2	131.48
Jan 18–24, 2016	(Canada) 2016 Canadian Championships (Junior)	4	56.29	2	84.94	2	141.23
Feb 14–16, 2016	(Norway) 2016 Winter Youth Olympics	4	51.06	4	74.81	4	125.87
Feb 20, 2016	(Norway) 2016 Winter Youth Olympics (Team event)	–	–	3	73.78	3	–
Mar 14–20, 2016	(Hungary) 2016 World Junior Championships	11	52.57	13	75.49	13	128.06

Results in the 2016–17 season
Date	Event	SD		FD		Total	
Date	Event	P	Score	P	Score	P	Score
Sep 9–11, 2016	2016 JGP Japan	4	57.02	4	80.12	4	137.14
Oct 5–8, 2016	2016 JGP Germany	3	57.32	4	82.35	4	139.67
Nov 30 – Dec 4, 2016	2017 Skate Canada Challenge	1	62.66	1	91.20	1	153.86
Jan 16–22, 2017	(Canada) 2017 Canadian Championships (Junior)	1	61.62	1	91.93	1	153.55
Feb 14–19, 2017	(Germany) 2017 Bavarian Open	3	53.24	1	87.96	2	141.20
Mar 15–19, 2017	(Taiwan) 2017 World Junior Championships	5	60.79	7	87.47	6	148.26

Results in the 2017–18 season
Date	Event	SD		FD		Total	
Date	Event	P	Score	P	Score	P	Score
Aug 25–26, 2017	2017 JGP Australia	2	58.55	2	80.37	2	138.92
Sep 29–30, 2017	2017 JGP Croatia	1	62.89	1	87.41	1	150.30
Dec 8–9, 2017	(Japan) 2017–18 Junior Grand Prix Final	4	60.52	6	80.76	6	141.28
Jan 8–14, 2018	(Canada) 2018 Canadian Championships (Junior)	1	65.02	1	89.02	1	154.40
Mar 5–11, 2018	(Bulgaria) 2018 World Junior Championships	2	62.39	5	83.83	4	146.22

Results in the 2018–19 season
Date	Event	RD		FD		Total	
Date	Event	P	Score	P	Score	P	Score
Aug 29 – Sep 1, 2018	2018 JGP Austria	2	63.95	2	89.84	2	153.79
Sep 12–15, 2018	2018 JGP Canada	1	65.67	1	100.95	1	166.52
Dec 6–7, 2018	(Canada) 2018–19 Junior Grand Prix Final	4	66.25	3	98.26	4	164.51
Jan 14–20, 2019	(Canada) 2019 Canadian Championships (Junior)	1	70.87	1	108.84	1	179.71
Feb 5–10, 2019	(Germany) 2019 Bavarian Open	1	67.35	1	101.99	1	169.34
Mar 4–10, 2019	(Croatia) 2019 World Junior Championships	1	70.14	1	105.96	1	176.10
