= Cocoricò (nightclub) =

Nightclub in Riccione, Italy

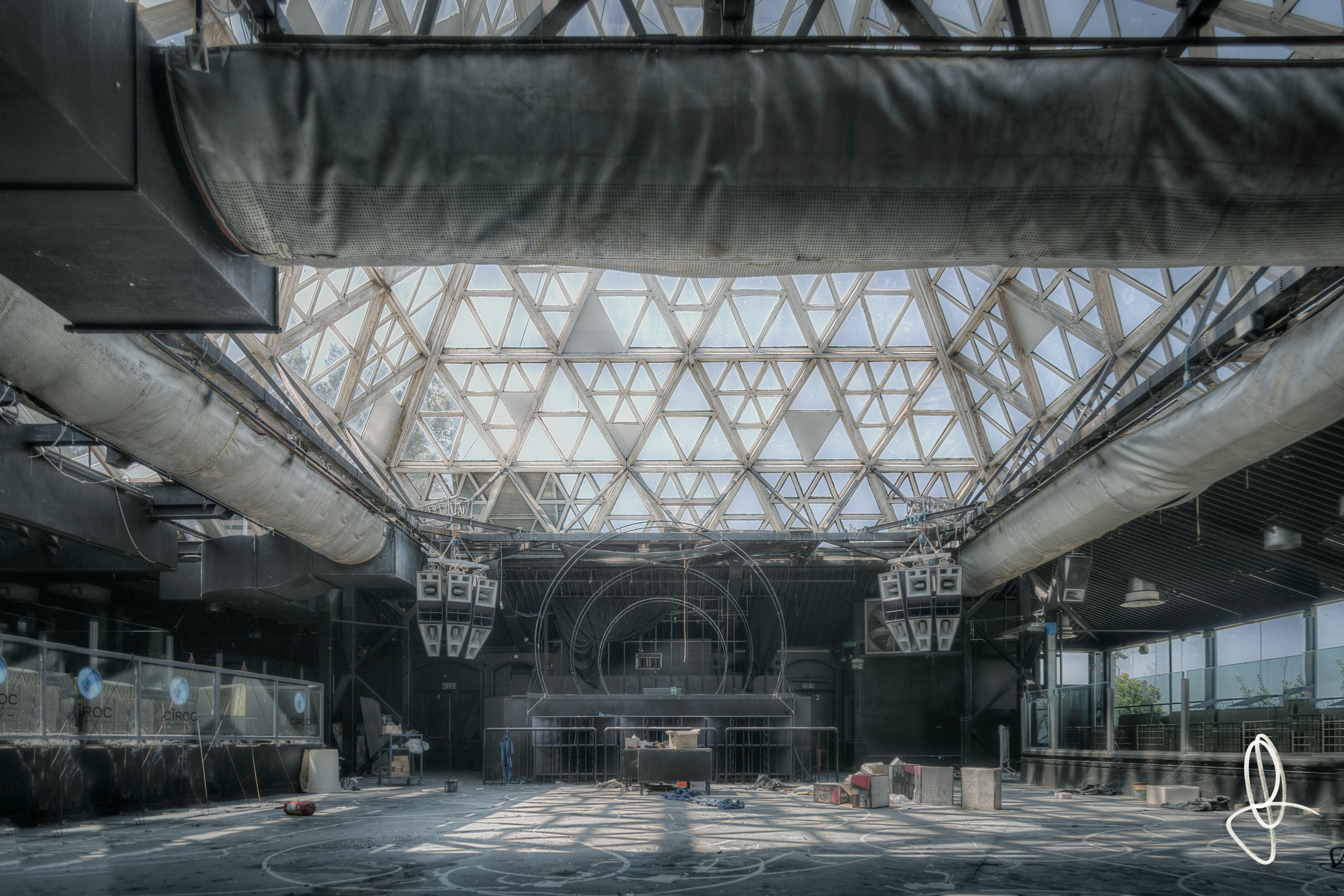
- Piramide, the main room, July 2019
- Interactive map of Cocoricò
- Location: Riccione, Province of Rimini, Italy
- Coordinates: 43°59′16″N 12°39′24″E
- Type: Nightclub
- Capacity: 6,000

Construction
- Opened: 15 August 1989; 36 years ago
- Closed: 13 June 2019
- Reopened: 27 November 2021

Website
- cocorico.it

Cocoricò is a nightclub in Riccione, in the Province of Rimini, Emilia-Romagna, specialising in techno, house, and tech house music.

Opened on 15 August 1989, Cocoricò became one of Italy's most famous nightclubs with a reputation for provocative and transgressive clubbing. Its name and distinctive pyramid shape became a recognised symbol of Riccione's nightlife and youth tourism along the riviera romagnola. In 2015, DJ Magazine's readers voted Cocoricò sixteenth worldwide in its annual Top 100 Clubs poll, describing it as "a monumental Mecca of dance music". Not only did the nightclub become famous, but its individual rooms, such as Morphine, Titilla, and Ciao Sex, became distinctive, recognised clubbing brands.

In August 2015, Cocoricò was forcibly closed for four months after the death of a 16-year-old patron by drug overdose. The closure attracted significant commentary in the Italian press, and has been widely attributed to the nightclub's subsequent decline. Following official investigations into tax evasion worth over 10 million euros and unpaid municipal waste disposal taxes, the nightclub's managing company was declared bankrupt in June 2019. Cocoricò reopened under new management on 27 November 2021, following a two-million-euro renovation.

Past disc-jockeys, performers, and patrons at Cocoricò include Aphex Twin, Tale Of Us, Juan Atkins, Leigh Bowery, Armin van Buuren, Claudio Coccoluto, Carl Cox, Lucio Dalla, Paul van Dyk, Jean-Paul Gaultier, David Guetta, Daft Punk, Martin Garrix, Richie Hawtin, Grace Jones, Frankie Knuckles, Amelie Lens, Stefano Noferini, Francesco Moschino, Salome, Isabella Santacroce, Fatboy Slim, Seth Troxler, Sven Väth, and Pier Vittorio Tondelli.

== History ==
=== Launch ===
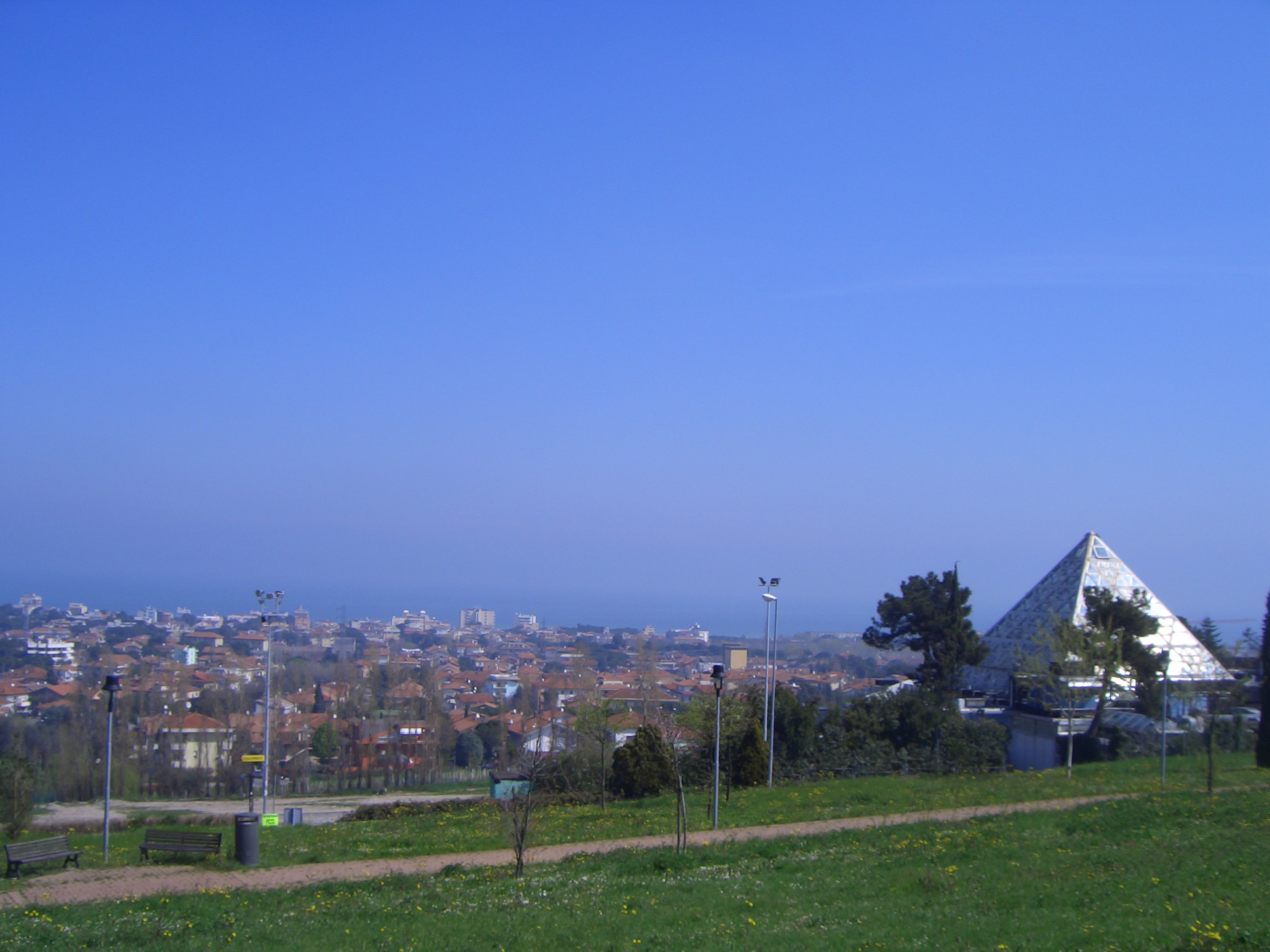
The nightclub's distinctive pyramid overlooking Riccione in March 2007

Cocoricò was first conceived by Bruno Palazzi in 1984. Its pyramid was conceived by Osvaldo Barbieri, who was inspired by Ieoh Ming Pei's Louvre Pyramid, completed in 1988. Cocoricò's construction was executed by an unknown Sammarinese engineer.

The nightclub opened on 15 August 1989 on Via Chieti, opposite the Agolanti Castle in Riccione's hilly outskirts. Former nightclubs on the site were called Club dei 99 and Lex Club, a gay club. At its launch, Cocoricò comprised two rooms, Piramide and Titilla. The nightclub's name was derived from the onomatopoeic sound of a rooster's cry. It closed almost immediately after opening, but reopened with new staff in 1990.

=== Boom years ===
In 1993, Loris Riccardi was appointed Cocoricò's artistic director. Under Riccardi's direction, the nightclub gained notoriety for provocative and transgressive clubbing, reminiscent of the surrealism of filmmaker Federico Fellini, who was born in Rimini. The nightclub's rooms themselves, expanded in 1994 to include Morphine, Ciao Sex, and Strix, themselves gained worldwide recognition. The phrase sabato allora andiamo al Cocco! ("so on Saturday let's go to the Cocco!") entered popular culture. Its busiest nights were Ferragosto, coinciding with the summer beach holiday season along the riviera romagnola. The club inspired Isabella Santacroce's first novel, Fluo.

On 4 November 1995, the nightclub hosted its first Memorabilia party, which would become one of the nightclub's flagship events. Other flagship events included Les Foiles de Pigalle, Doc Show, Diabolika, and Cocoon. In 1996, Cocoricò was invited to represent Italy at the Love Parade festival.

=== Decline ===
In 2008, the nightclub was purchased by a group of entrepreneurs from Rome. The new management transitioned Cocoricò away from its transgressive reputation, becoming better known for the guaranteed quality of its headline acts. In 2012, the nightclub was taken over by management company Piramide SRL.

During the 2010s, the nightclub, which recorded its first death by drug overdose in December 2004, developed an image crisis for drug use. Relations particularly deteriorated between the nightclub and Riccione's municipal administration. In December 2011, the nightclub closed for two weeks after an eighteen-year-old patron went into a coma following an MDMA overdose.

Motivated by petty crimes and drug dealing in the nightclub, Rimini's police commissioner forcibly closed Cocoricò between 25 August and 15 September 2013, revoking Piramide SRL's licence. In response, the nightclub installed new cameras, random checks, and substance abuse information posters. It also began a series of collaborative initiatives with the San Patrignano drug rehabilitation centre.

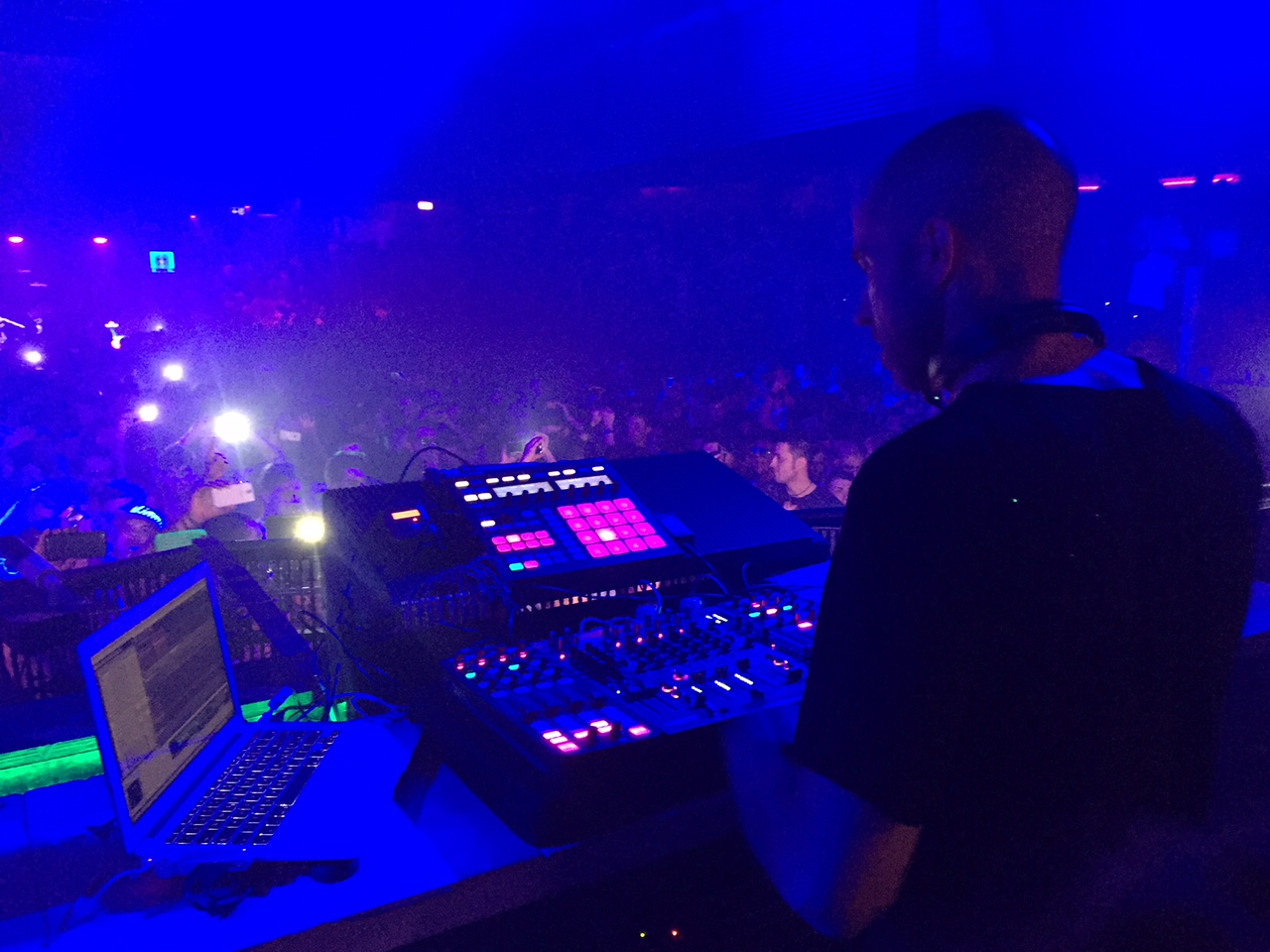
Chris Liebing performing at Cocoricò, January 2015

In February 2014, the nightclub was charged with participating in obscene acts and shows after a performance required patrons to enter through a room with six naked artists. The performance was stopped by military soldiers; its cancellation provoked two parliamentary questions and a public intervention from the art critic Vittorio Sgarbi.

In June 2014, a safe was stolen from the management company's headquarters; in the following years, the nightclub cited the theft to delay paying suppliers and booking agency invoices.

=== 2015 death and closure ===
In July 2015, a sixteen-year-old patron died in Riccione's Ceccarini Hospital following an MDMA overdose at the nightclub. Though Cocoricò denied any connection between the drug's vendor and the nightclub, Riccione's carabinieri filed an official request to Rimini's police commissioner to close the nightclub, citing fights, thefts, drug dealing, and emergency ambulance calls at Cocoricò over the previous two years. A week after the death, Fabrizio de Meis, the nightclub's owner, resigned, saying that he felt "alone and helpless" in the nightclub's battle against substance abuse. He later returned to his position.

On 2 August 2015, Maurizio Improta, Rimini's police commissioner, forcibly closed the nightclub for four months. The decision attracted significant commentary in the Italian press, including from the Minister of the Interior, Angelino Alfano, an editorial in Vatican newspaper L'Osservatore Romano, disc jockey Claudio Coccoluto, journalist Selvaggia Lucarelli, actor Luca Bizzarri, and politicians Gianluca Pini, Sergio Pizzolante, Daniele Capezzone and Matteo Salvini. A petition against the nightclub's closure attracted hundreds of signatures. De Meis forecasted that the closure would cost up to 2 million euros in the nightclub's profits, as well as 200 redundancies. On 11 August 2015, Cocoricò reopened to host a drug awareness evening, with over 700 attendees. The following month, Marco Palazzi, the nightclub's CEO, suggested that Cocoricò could relocate abroad if the country's laws did not change to offer more protection to nightclubs.

The nightclub reopened on 6 December 2015. In new rules introduced by the nightclub, minors were banned from regular entry, with a series of alcohol-free evenings for those under 18. A quiet, social room was installed, while the car park was closed to allow a new station for bouncers in front of an expanded entrance. The death and club's subsequent closure were widely attributed to the nightclub's final decline.

=== Bankruptcy ===
In August 2015, Rimini's Guardia di Finanzia announced that it had discovered significant tax evasion by the nightclub's former management. The tax evasion was valued at over 10 million euros, and named both De Meis and Palazzi as suspects. In February 2016, Riccione's municipal government announced that it was missing 400,000 euros in waste disposal tax from the nightclub, including 97,651 euros from Piramide SRL since 2012.

In the summer of 2018, to celebrate its thirtieth anniversary, the nightclub hosted 70 events across the riviera romagnola, including a concert at the Cocoricò by Armin van Buuren. The events recorded 80,000 attendees, including 10,000 international tourists.

In December 2018, Riccione's municipal government suspended the nightclub's licence for three months, citing 80,000 euros in unpaid waste disposal tax from the previous two years. The nightclub promised to appeal to the regional court. After it paid an advance of 48,000 euros, the licence was restored so that the nightclub could open for New Year's Eve.

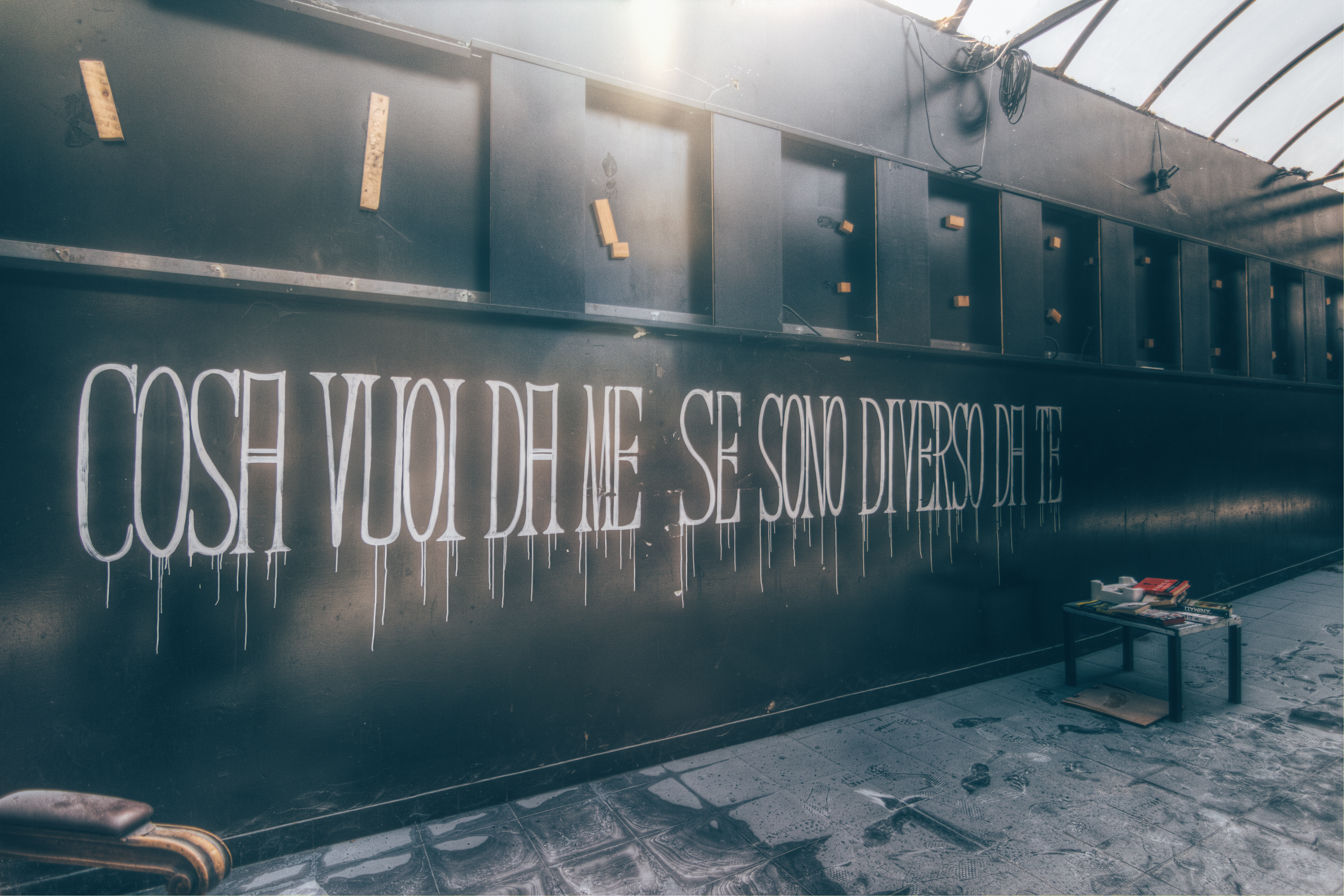
The writing on the wall in Piramide reads: "What do you want from me if I'm different from you?" (July 2019)

In January 2019, the Public Prosecutor's Office of Rimini seized 810,000 euros from the nightclub's management as a result of its tax irregularities from 2015 and 2016. In the same month, the Court of Appeal of Perugia opened an auction for the Cocoricò, Titilla, and Memorabilia brands; the brands had been seized from Cocoricò after DJ Gabry Ponte sued the nightclub for 200,000 euros in unpaid voices dating from July 2015. The auction was suspended on 24 January 2019, after Cocoricò's management company filed for bankruptcy and a preliminary petition for access to the composition of debt with creditors. In March 2019, Riccione's municipal administration suspended the nightclub's licence for three months, citing the unpaid waste disposal tax. A Change.org petition was launched to reopen the nightclub.

On 11 June 2019, the Bankruptcy Court of Rimini rejected Cocoricò's preliminary petition, declared the management company bankrupt, and appointed a liquidator. During its closed years, the nightclub was continually trespassed by burglars and souvenir-hunters.

=== Relaunch ===
Following the management's bankruptcy, the venue was bought by Enrico Galli, owner of Altromondo Studios. With cocurator Antonella Bonicalzi, Galli began renovating the nightclub, a project valued at over two million euros. The renovation included a new reserved backstage area and summer garden. The relaunch party was planned for 12 April 2020 under the name "Cocco", but it was postponed by the COVID-19 pandemic. In July 2020, Galli repurchased the Cocoricò brand at the bankruptcy auction, as well as the brands of the individual rooms, reportedly at over 200,000 euros.

The nightclub reopened as Cocoricò on 27 November 2021. The 1,800 pre-sale tickets for its opening night were sold within thirty minutes: the nightclub's capacity was limited to 50% because of pandemic restrictions. The reopening night included Seth Troxler and Salome. The relaunched nightclub offers discounted entry tickets for female clubgoers, requires gender parity in table reservations, and has banned male clubbers aged under 20. As part of the relaunch, the techno in the Piramide room was softened, while harder music was sent to T-Room, the new name for Titilla.

A documentary entitled Cocoricò Tapes was compiled in 2022, documenting the nightclub's reputation and legacy through private and public footage during the 1990s. The film was produced by Francesco Tavella, crowdfunded, and supported by the Film Commission of the Emilia-Romagna Region. It premiered at the Pesaro New Cinema Festival on 18 June 2023. The documentary won the Premio Sebastiano Gesù at the 2023 Ortigia Film Festival.

In September 2023, the Memorabilia party was hosted at Misano World Circuit.

== Features ==
Cocoricò has a capacity for 6,000 people. It is distinguished for its iconic transparent pyramid structure.

=== Rooms ===
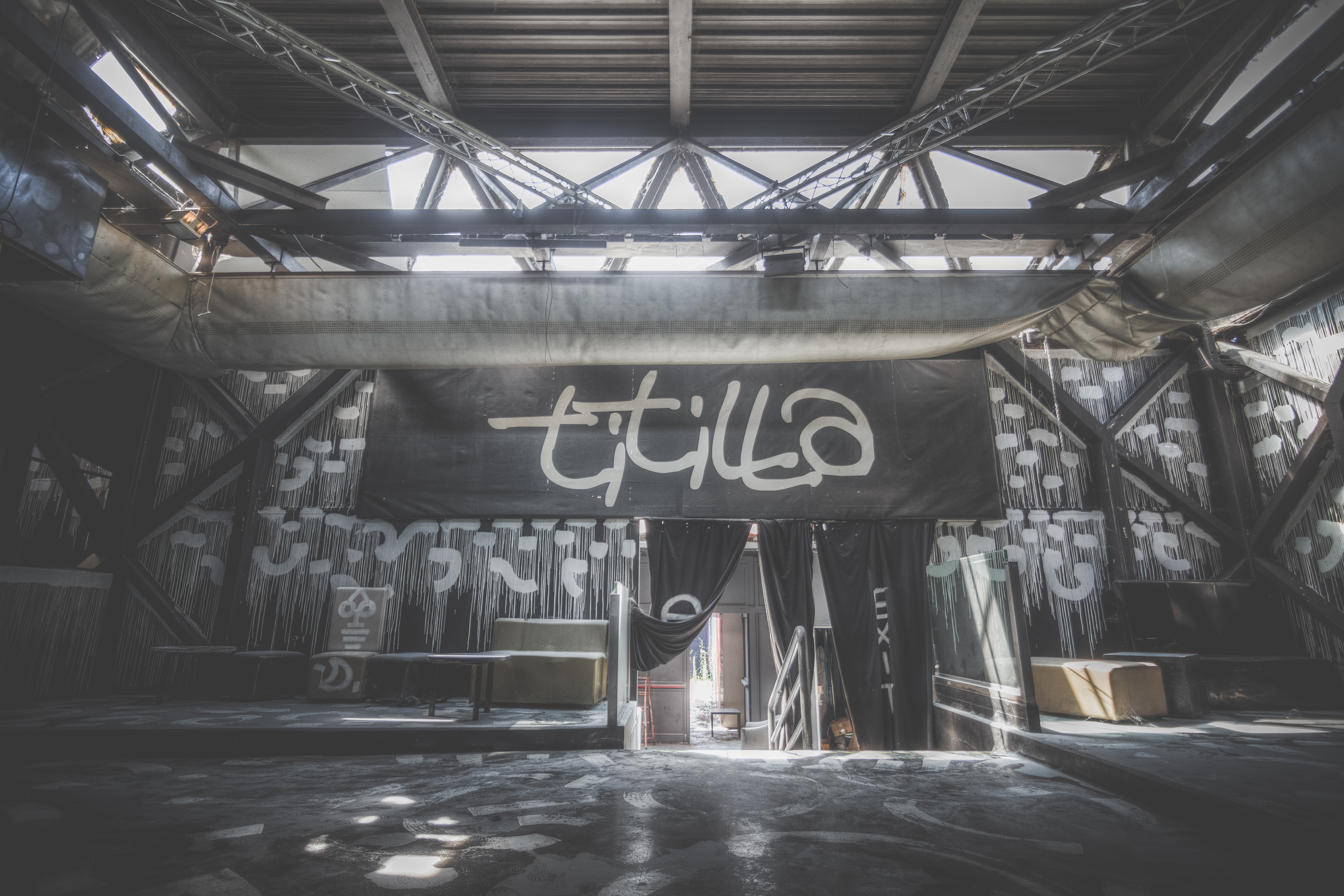
The entrance to Titilla, now T-Room, July 2019

The current rooms in the nightclub are:

- Piramide, the main room, has provided soft house and tech house music since the 2021 reopening. In the 1990s, it was a catch-all room, known for harder techno.
- T-Room, dedicated to techno. Before the 2021 reopening, the room was called Titilla, a more sedate, private room dedicated to house music. Its capacity is 300 people.

Former rooms at the nightclub were:

- Ciao Sex, an open-air room known for walking performances and popular among LGBT partygoers;
- Strix, a room that resembled a speakeasy; and
- Morphine, a more relaxed room that attracted left-oriented intellectuals, dedicated to musical research and avant-garde music.

=== MUDI ===
On 25 April 2021, Cocoricò launched the Museo Discocratico (Discocratic Museum, or MUDI), the first digital museum hosted in an Italian nightclub, with immersive experiences in NFT and 3D art. The museum hosts exhibitions and live performances alongside archival footage of the nightclub. As well as Galli and Bonicalzi, the project was conceived by Cocoricò's artistic director, Mike Pagliarulo, and its musical artistic director, Alex Franconeri. It was projected to welcome 8,000 visitors per weekend.
