= I'm Fine, How Are You? =

Studio album by Airto
- Released: 1977
- Recorded: July/August 1977; Paramount Studios, Hollywood, Kendun Recorders, Burbank
- Genre: Samba jazz, jazz rock, jazz fusion, Brazilian music
- Length: 38:49
- Label: Warner Bros. WB 56413
- Producer: Flora Purim & Airto Moreira for Zara Productions; Co-producer: Kerry McNabb

Airto Moreira chronology
Promises of the Sun (1976)	I'm Fine, How Are You? (1977)	Touching You… Touching Me (1979)

Professional ratings
Review scores
Source	Rating
AllMusic	1.5/5 stars

I'm Fine, How Are You? is an album by the Brazilian jazz drummer and percussionist Airto Moreira released in 1977.

Samples from "Celebration Suite" were later used as the basis for Bellini's 1997 hit song "Samba de Janeiro".

== Track listing ==
=== Side one ===
1. "I'm fine. How are you?" (Airto Moreira) – 5:11
2. "Meni Devol" (Ruben Rada, Hugo Fattoruso) – 5:11
3. "La Tumbadora" (Rada, Fattoruso) – 3:39
4. "The Happy People" (Moreira) – 3:48

=== Side two ===
1. "The Road Is Hard (But We're Going To Make It)" (Flora Purim) – 5:32
2. "La Cumbia De Andres" (Rada, Fattoruso) – 4:24
3. "Celebration Suite" (Moreira) – 4:16
4. "Nativity" (feat. Jaco Pastorius) – 6:44

== Personnel ==
Musicians

- Airto Moreira – percussion
- Laudir de Oliveira – percussion on "The Happy People" and "Celebration Suite"
- Manolo Badrena – percussion on "La Tumbadora"
- Hugo Fattoruso – keyboards
- Byron Miller – bass guitar on all tracks except "The Road Is Hard (We We're Going To Make It)"
- Abraham Laboriel – bass guitar on "The Road Is Hard (We We're Going To Make It)"
- Jaco Pastorius – bass guitar on "Nativity"
- Tom Scott – sax, flute on "I'm fine. How are you?" and "The Road Is Hard (We We're Going To Make It)"
- Raul de Souza – trombone on "The Happy People" and "Celebration Suite"
- Charles (Icarus) Johnson – guitar
- Oscar C. Neves – guitar on "The Happy People" and "Celebration Suite"
- Ruben Rada – vocals on "Meni Devol" and "La Tumbadora"
- Flora Purim – vocals on "The Road Is Hard (But We're Going To Make It)"
- Maria Fattoruso – backing vocals

Production

- Kerry McNabb – engineering
- John Cabalka – art direction, design
- Brad Kanawyer – design
- Claude Mougin – photography
- Julian Falk – kite design
