= Taff (TV series) =

taff
- Genre: tabloid journalism
- Country of origin: Germany
- Original language: German
- No. of episodes: 1044

Production
- Production location: Unterföhring
- Running time: approx. 45 minutes

Original release
- Network: ProSiebenSat.1 Media
- Release: 29 May 1995 – present

taff (acronym for "täglich, aktuell, frisch, frech" which roughly translates as "daily, current, fresh, cheeky") is a German tabloid television programme. It airs from 17:00 (5:00 pm) to 18:00 (6:00 pm) on ProSieben.

== History ==
The first edition was transmitted under the name taff. (with a dot) on 29 May 1995.

== Hosts ==
Current hosts
Host	Beginning	Complementary
Annemarie Carpendale	2005	
Daniel Aminati	2009	
Rebecca Mir	2012	
Thore Schölermann	2012	
Viviane Geppert	2016	
Christian Düren	2017	

Former hosts
Moderator	Beginning	End	Complementary
Sabine Noethen	1995	1997	
Eva Mähl	1997	1998	
Britta Sander	1998	2001	
Steven Gätjen	1999	2001	From February to April 1999 initially representing
Alexander Mazza	1998	1998	taff extra
Anna Bosch	2001	2002	
Stefan Pinnow	2001	2002	
Dominik Bachmair	2002	2005	
Miriam Pielhau	2002	2005	
Stefan Gödde	2005	2009	
Charlotte Würdig	2007	2009	Representation for Annemarie Carpendale
Simon-Paul Wagner	2008	2008	Representation for Stefan Gödde
Nela Lee	2009	2014	First, representation for Annemarie Carpendale
Stefanie Giesinger	2014	2014	Only one show, after whose victory in Germany's Next Topmodel
Bonnie Strange	2015	2016	Representation for Annemarie Carpendale und Rebecca Mir
Joko Winterscheidt und Klaas Heufer-Umlauf	2019	2019	One-off as a bet
