= Annemarie Carpendale =

German television presenter

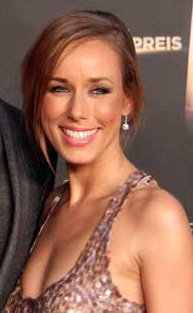
- Carpendale in 2012
- Born: Annemarie Warnkross; 29 October 1977 (age 48); Hanover, Germany
- Occupation: Television host
- Years active: 2000–present
- Spouse: Wayne Carpendale (m. 2013)

Annemarie Carpendale (née Warnkross; born 29 October 1977) is a German television presenter. She has been with ProSieben since 2005, where she hosts the tabloid programs taff and red!. From 2000 to 2005, she was a dancer in the band Bellini.

== Biography ==
Carpendale was born in Hanover and grew up in Siegen, where her mother worked as a primary school teacher. She danced in ballet, played piano and performed in various theatres.

In 2000, she became a dancer in the pop group Bellini. In 2005, she left the band to concentrate on presenting and studying for college. In between, she had extra appearances in various television series, shows and in the film Pura Vida Ibiza. She was also active in the news editorial team of RTL Zwei and worked part-time as a photo and catwalk model. In 2002, she took part in a casting at VIVA and made it into the final selection. From March 2004, she hosted the charts, from May 2004 she worked for the Club Rotation format.

Since March 2005, Carpendale has hosted the program taff on ProSieben, initially together with Stefan Gödde and since March 2009 with Daniel Aminati. Since November 2008, she has also hosted the weekly celebrity and lifestyle show red! Stars, Lifestyle & More. Since 2007, she and Steven Gätjen have presented the ProSieben coverage of the Academy Awards, in which taff and red! broadcasts annually from Los Angeles. After Gätjen's departure from ProSieben, she was accompanied in 2016 by taff presenter Viviane Geppert. From 2016 to 2018, Carpendale hosted the dating show Kiss Bang Love.

The tenth season of the ProSieben and Sat.1 casting show The Voice of Germany has been presented by Carpendale as a substitute for Lena Gercke, alongside Thore Schölermann.

== Personal life ==
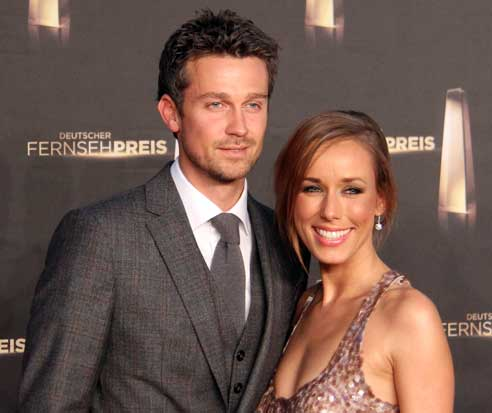
Wayne and Annemarie Carpendale at the German Television Awards 2012

Carpendale was in a relationship with Oliver Pocher from 2002 to 2004. In September 2013, she married actor Wayne Carpendale in Ibiza, with whom she had been in a relationship from November 2007 and to whom she became engaged in December 2011. Their son was born in May 2018.

== Filmography ==
=== Film ===
- 2004: Pura Vida Ibiza
- 2011: Men in the City 2

=== Television ===
- 1999: Kinderquatsch mit Michael (1 Episode)
- 2004: Interaktiv (3 Episodes)
- 2004: Weck Up (1 Episode)
- 2005: Die 100 nervigsten... (1 Episode)
- 2006: Extreme Activity (2 Episodes)
- 2006: Quiz Taxi (1 Episode)
- 2008: Promi ärgere dich nicht! (1 Episode)
- seit 2011: Sat.1-Frühstücksfernsehen (regular)
- 2012: Der Landarzt (1 Episode)
- 2012: Markus Lanz (1 Episode)
- 2014: Die Garmisch-Cops (1 Episode)
- 2018: Pastewka (1 Episode)
- 2018: Endlich Feierabend! (1 Episode)

=== As host ===
- 2004–2005: VIVA Club Rotation (VIVA)
- since 2005: taff (ProSieben)
- 2007: Bravo Supershow
- since 2007: Oscars (ProSieben)
- since 2008: red! Stars, Lifestyle & More (ProSieben)
- 2011: VIPictures by red! (ProSieben)
- 2012: VIPictures Hollywood (ProSieben)
- 2016–2018: Kiss Bang Love (ProSieben)
- 2016: Ran an den Mann, 2 Seasons (Sat.1, with Wayne Carpendale)
- 2017: It's Showtime! Das Battle der Besten, 6 Episodes in 1 Season (Sat.1)
- 2020: The Voice of Germany, season 10 (ProSieben and Sat.1)
