= Galileo (German TV series) =

German television program

- Presented by: ProSieben
- Starring: Aiman Abdallah among others
- Country of origin: Germany
- Original language: German
- No. of episodes: Over 6,000

Production
- Running time: 60–70 minutes

Original release
- Release: 30 November 1998

Galileo is a German television program series produced and broadcast on ProSieben television network. It is also sold to broadcasters in other countries (namely Russia and Poland).

The first show was broadcast in 1998, and is now stored in the Arctic World Archive in Svalbard, Norway, after being transferred to special film created by Piql.

Galileo also has a YouTube channel which has more than 3 million subscribers as of May 2026.

Former German national rugby player Aiman Abdallah is one of the presenters.
