= Samba de Janeiro =

1997 single by Bellini

- Original version cover

Single by Bellini

from the album Samba de Janeiro
- Released: 5 May 1997
- Genre: Eurodance; Latin house
- Length: 2:49
- Label: Orbit; Virgin
- Songwriters: Gottfried Engels; Ramon Zenker; Airto Moreira; Hugo Fattoruso
- Producers: Gottfried Engels; Ramon Zenker

Bellini singles chronology
"Samba de Janeiro" (1997)	"Carnaval" (1997)

Music video
- "Samba de Janeiro" on YouTube

"Samba de Janeiro" (Brazilian Portuguese: [ˈsɐ̃bɐ dʒi ʒɐˈnejɾu]) is a song by German group Bellini. It was released on 5 May 1997 in Germany as their debut single and the lead single from their debut album of the same name (1997). The song was a hit throughout Europe, reaching number-one in Hungary and the top 10 in at least 12 countries. It interpolates the chorus of Airto Moreira's 1972 song "Tombo in 7/4", as well as sampling the drum rhythm from Moreira's 1977 song called "Celebration Suite". Gottfried Engels and Ramon Zenker were the co-authors and producers of the song. The accompanying music video was directed by Rainer Thieding and filmed in Hamburg, Germany.

"Samba de Janeiro" won the award for best dance single at the 7th annual Echo Awards. Despite bearing this name, the track is not a samba, but a Eurodance and Latin house track, and the song is little known in Brazil.

== Composition ==
The composition was originally written by Airto Moreira under the title "Tombo In 7/4" and released on his album Fingers in 1973. Moreira's song begins as a jazz–samba fusion in 7/4 time, which later turns into a samba in 4/4 time. In 1977, Moreira released a reworked song named Celebration Suite as part of his album "I'm Fine, How Are You?". It was also based on the 1996 track "Belo Horizonti" by The Heartists.

Gottfried Engels and Ramon Zenker added further elements to this musical foundation and adapted the rhythm to contemporary European pop music, so that, despite the title, "Samba de Janeiro" is not a true samba, but instead a Eurodance and Latin house track.

The song is sung by the lead singer of the group's first line-up, Brazilian singer Dandara Santos.

== Critical reception ==
In September 1997, Alan Jones from Music Week wrote about the song, "Fitting in with the current vogue for all things Latin, Bellini's 'Samba de Janeiro' is maddeningly familiar from first hearing — probably because fellow Virgin recording act The Heartists' single 'Belo Horizonti' is essentially the same song. Bright, breezy, commercial and a hit whose time has come."

== Chart performance ==
"Samba de Janeiro" peaked at number one in Hungary and number two in both Germany and Switzerland. It entered the top 10 in Austria, Belgium, Denmark, Finland, France, Iceland, Ireland, the Netherlands, and the United Kingdom, as well as on the Eurochart Hot 100, where the single reached number three. In the UK, it peaked at number eight during its first week on the UK Singles Chart, on 21 September 1997. It also charted on the UK Dance Chart, peaking at number 12. Additionally, "Samba de Janeiro" was a top-20 hit in Norway and a top-30 hit in Sweden.

The single sold 5 million copies worldwide and reached the top 10 of Europe's major international charts, but failed to reach number 1 in any country. A German version titled "Samba de Janeiro (Samba Ramba Zamba)" was performed by Gottlieb Wendehals, also in 1997.

Conversely, the song failed to chart in Brazil or the United States.

== Music video ==
The video was shot in Hamburg's Karolinenpassage, where a carnival parade was staged specifically for the filming. Four dancers from Germany, Brazil, Indonesia, and Thailand, as well as one dancer from Morocco, were hired to create a multicultural effect.

The video was produced by the Hamburg film production company Chopstick Films and directed by Rainer Thieding.

== Track listings ==
- 12-inch single
1. "Samba de Janeiro" (Original Version) – 5:38
2. "Samba de Janeiro" (Peter Parker Rmx) – 5:52
- CD single
1. "Samba de Janeiro" (Radio Edit) – 2:50
2. "Samba de Janeiro" (Club Mix) – 5:38
3. "Samba de Janeiro" (Vanity Back Yard Remix) – 5:18
4. "Samba de Janeiro" (Peter Parker Remix) – 5:52
5. "Samba de Janeiro" (John Acquaviva Remix) – 7:59
6. "Samba de Janeiro" (Merlyn Remix) – 6:00
- CD maxi
1. "Samba de Janeiro" (Radio Edit) – 2:50
2. "Samba de Janeiro" (Club Mix) – 5:38
3. "Samba de Janeiro" (Vanity Back Yard Remix) – 5:18
4. "Samba de Janeiro" (Peter Parker Remix) – 5:52
- Cassette single
1. "Samba de Janeiro" (Radio Edit) – 2:50
2. "Samba de Janeiro" (Club Mix) – 5:38
3. "Samba de Janeiro" (Vanity Back Yard Mix) – 5:18
4. "Samba de Janeiro" (Radio Edit) – 2:50
5. "Samba de Janeiro" (Club Mix) – 5:38
6. "Samba de Janeiro" (Vanity Back Yard Mix) – 5:18

== Charts ==
=== Weekly charts ===
Chart (1997)	Peak position
Austria (Ö3 Austria Top 40)	3
Belgium (Ultratop 50 Flanders)	4
Belgium (Ultratop 50 Wallonia)	4
Denmark (IFPI)	8
Europe (Eurochart Hot 100)	3
Finland (Suomen virallinen lista)	6
France (SNEP)	3
Germany (GfK)	2
Hungary (Mahasz)	1
Iceland (Íslenski Listinn Topp 40)	7
Ireland (IRMA)	6
Israel (Israeli Singles Chart)	3
Netherlands (Dutch Top 40)	7
Netherlands (Single Top 100)	10
Norway (VG-lista)	12
Scottish Singles Sales (Official Charts)	6
Sweden (Sverigetopplistan)	23
Switzerland (Schweizer Hitparade)	2
UK Singles (Official Charts)	8
UK Dance (Official Charts)	12
UK Indie (Music Week)	1

=== Year-end charts ===
Chart (1997)	Position
Austria (Ö3 Austria Top 40)	15
Belgium (Ultratop 50 Flanders)	41
Belgium (Ultratop 50 Wallonia)	22
Europe (Eurochart Hot 100)	14
Germany (Media Control)	10
Israel (Israeli Singles Chart)	22
Netherlands (Dutch Top 40)	50
Netherlands (Single Top 100)	54
Romania (Romanian Top 100)	51
Switzerland (Schweizer Hitparade)	13
UK Singles (OCC)	124

== Certifications ==
Region	Certification	Certified units/sales
Austria (IFPI Austria)	Gold	25,000^{*}
Belgium (BRMA)	Gold	25,000^{*}
France (SNEP)	Gold	250,000^{*}
Germany (BVMI)	Platinum	500,000^{^}
Italy (FIMI)	Gold	50,000^{‡}
Switzerland (IFPI Switzerland)	Gold	25,000^{^}
United Kingdom (BPI)	Silver	200,000^{‡}
^{*} Sales figures based on certification alone.^{^} Shipments figures based on certification alone.^{‡} Sales+streaming figures based on certification alone.

== Release history ==
Region	Date	Format(s)	Label(s)	Ref.
Europe	5 May 1997	CD	Orbit; Virgin	
Japan	3 September 1997	CD	Virgin	

== 2014 reworking as Samba do Brasil ==
"Samba do Brasil"
- Single cover

Single by Bellini

from the album Festival
- Released: 6 June 2014
- Length: 3:17
- Label: Polydor
- Songwriters: Gottfried Engels; Ramon Zenker; Farid Gharadjedaghi; Airto Moreira; Hugo Fattoruso
- Producer: Farid Gharadjedaghi

Music video
- "Samba do Brasil" on YouTube

"Samba do Brasil" (Brazilian Portuguese: [ˈsɐ̃bɐ du bɾaˈziw]) is a song by German group Bellini. It was released on 6 June 2014, and it is a reworking of the 1997 song Samba de Janeiro by the same group.

The reworked song is a blend of electronic music with elements of samba and bossa nova. It was one of the band's biggest hits. The song appeared on popular playlists and was included in several party music compilations.

=== Background ===
In 2014, the group, under a new formation featuring three vocalists, with those being Brazilian singer Myrthes Monteiro, Mexican singer Maria Efeldt and German singer Tracey Ellis, released Samba do Brasil, with fully Portuguese lyrics to celebrate the 2014 FIFA World Cup and the 2016 Summer Olympics, both held in Brazil.

In an interview, Monteiro explained that she had to teach Efeldt and Ellis how to sing in Portuguese. Efeldt initially thought it would be easy, but once she saw the song, she realized it was not what she imagined. Monteiro gave both Efeldt and Ellis phonetics lessons, carefully going through the lyrics word by word.

=== Music video ===
The music video for “Samba do Brasil” was mostly shot in Los Angeles, California, United States, but the video also has establishing shot images of Rio de Janeiro.

=== Chart performance ===
It quickly became a craze across many countries such Germany, France, Japan, and Poland, where it was adopted not only in football events but also in party scenes such as Ibiza.

Curiously, this adaptation is also little known in Brazil, just like the original 1997 song. The song was ignored by mainstream Brazilian radio stations and received little to no acknowledgment from local music critics in the South American country.

As of September 2025, the music video for the song has 67 million views on YouTube, and 66 million streams on Spotify.

== Other versions ==
The band Carrilio covered this song in 1997.

For the game Dance Dance Revolution in 1998, a cover version by Bass Fist! featuring Boogie Girl was used.

There is an alternate mix produced by Bellini called "Samba De Amigo" or "Samba De Janeiro 2000".

In 2022, a new arrangement of this song was created by YouNotUs and Louis III, entitled simply "Samba".

== Later use ==
The song was also featured in the 1999 arcade video game Samba de Amigo, which was later released for the Dreamcast in 2000 and the Wii in 2008. It would go on to be used in various crossover games featuring Samba de Amigo characters and locations, such as in the 2008 game Sega Superstars Tennis and the 2010 game Sonic & SEGA All-Stars Racing (excluding the Nintendo DS version). The song is also used in other video games, like Dance Dance Revolution (1998), Ronaldo V-Football (2000), Dance Central 3 (2012), Just Dance (2021), and others.

The melody of "Samba de Janeiro" was played every time a goal was scored during the UEFA Euro 2008. It was also used as goal music for Norwich City F.C. from 1998–2013 and from 2018–present, featuring as the club's official goal music in the video game FIFA 23.

"Samba de Janeiro" (Club Mix) was featured on Fox animated series The Simpsons episode "You Don't Have to Live Like a Referee". It was also used in movies like the 2000 movie The Yards, by James Gray, and the 2006 French movie Camping, by Fabien Onteniente.

Even today, the song is often used in football stadiums or carnival events to create a good atmosphere among the crowd. Also the song was used in many ads.
