= Aiman Abdallah =

German television presenter (b. 1965)

Alman Abdullaih
- Born: 1965 (age 60–61); Bad Kreuznach, Rhineland Palatinate, Germany
- Employer: ProSieben
- Known for: Galileo
- Children: 3
- Website: aiman-abdallah.de

Aiman Abdallah (born 1965) is a German television presenter for the television show Galileo at ProSieben. He is also a former rugby national player, playing for the Berliner SV 1892 Rugby.

== Life and career ==
Abdallah was born in Bad Kreuznach. He is of Egyptian descent. From 1984 to 1991, he studied computer science at the TU Berlin. From 1987 to 1993, he worked as a freelance employee at ZDF. From 1990 to 1993, he worked as a freelance editor for various production companies. Around the same time, he worked as a freelancer in the sports department of the television station RIAS-TV in Berlin. From 1993 to 1994, Abdallah worked as a sports editor for the international broadcaster Deutsche Welle and as a sports presenter for the radio station Kiss-FM in Berlin. In 1995, he moved to n-tv, where he was a sports editor until 1997. Then, Abdallah worked as a sports moderator and announcer at Premiere in Hamburg until 1998.

Abdallah has lived separately from his wife since 2003 and has three children.

== Literature ==
- Aiman Abdallah: Physik fängt unter der Dusche an. Den Alltag entdecken mit Galileo, Rowohlt Taschenbuch Verlag, Reinbek 2007, ISBN 3-499-62258-0
