= Claudio Coccoluto =

Italian disc jockey (1962–2021)

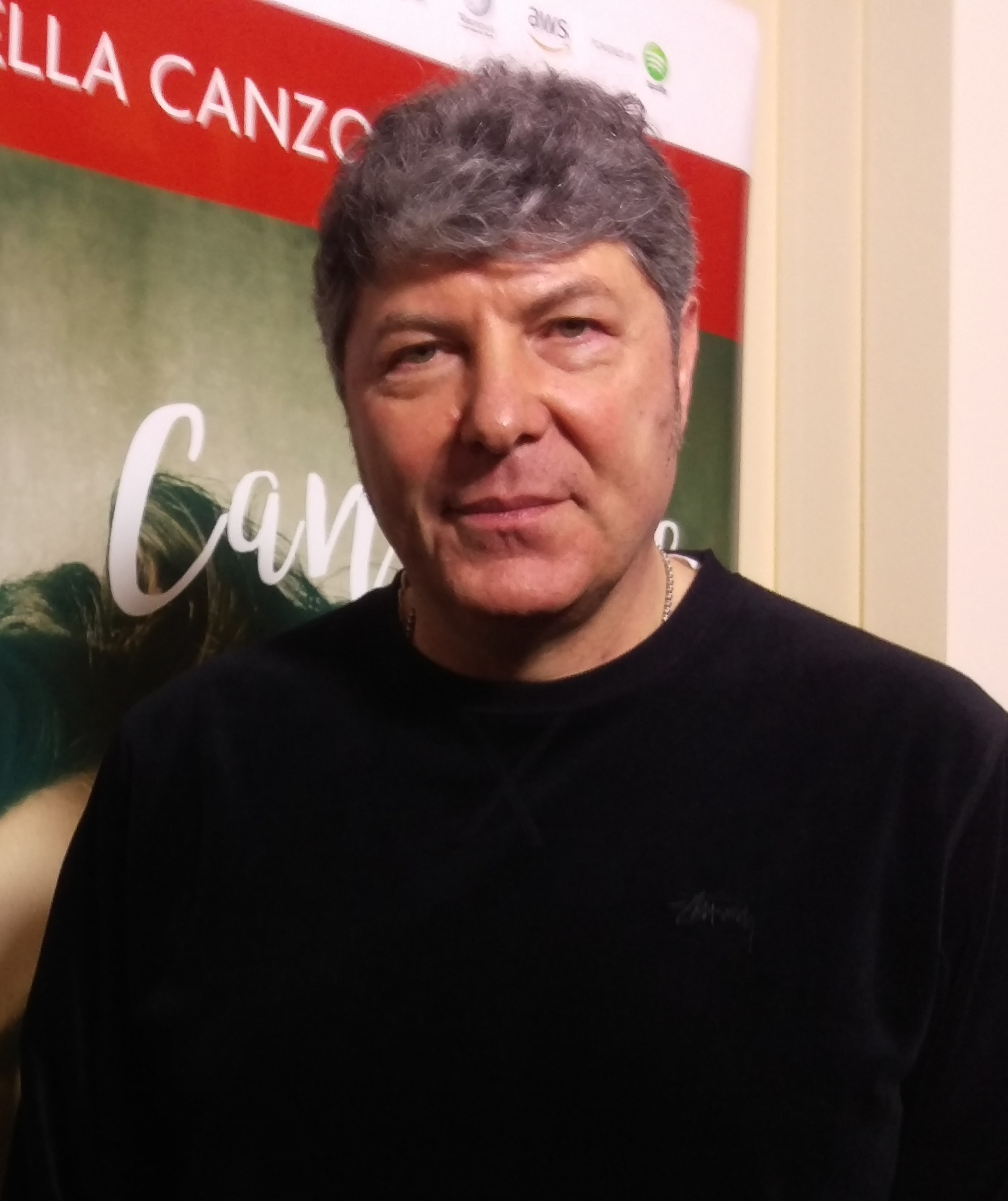

Claudio Coccoluto (Gaeta, 17 August 1962 – Cassino, 2 March 2021) was an Italian disc jockey. He co-founded one of Italy's most famous clubs, the Goa in Rome. In 2006, he ran for parliament for the left-libertarian Rosa nel Pugno party.
