= Bellini (German group) =

German girl group

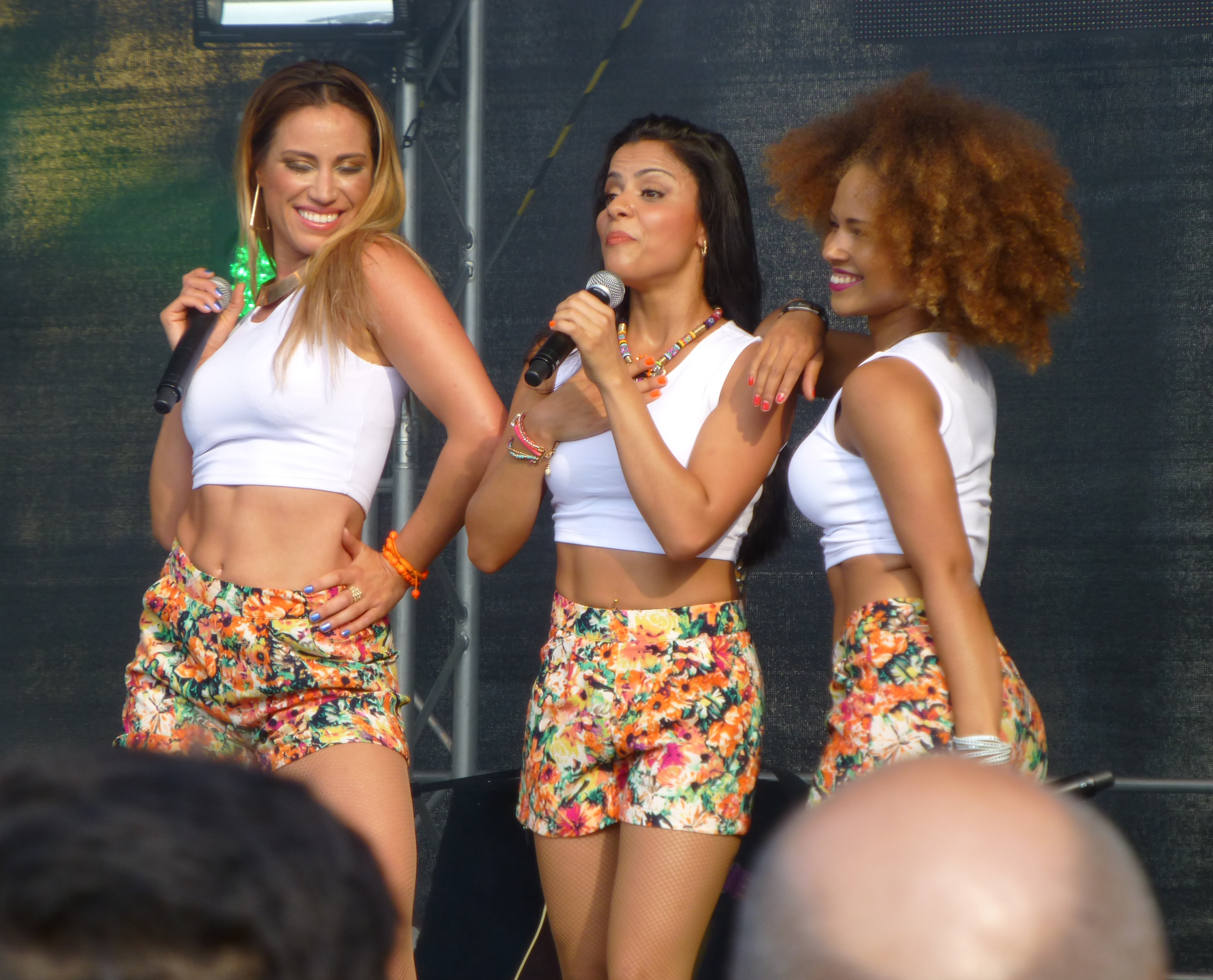
- 2013–2014 lineup of Bellini live in 2014 at Saarbrücken

Background information
- Origin: Germany
- Genres: Pop; dance
- Years active: 1997–2001, 2004–2010, 2013–2014, 2018–present
- Labels: Orbit; Polydor; Universal
- Members: Dandara Santos-Silva (1997–1998, 2018–present); Lisa Frieg (2018–present); Megan Sierz (2018–present)
- Past members: Onni Khoei-Arsa (1997–1999); Tanja Niethen (1997–1998); Dewi Sulaeman (1997–1998); Mustafa Makhloufi (1997); Sabrina Schmieder (1999–2009); Fabiana (1999–2003); Emilia Rizzo (2004–2004); Milena (2005–2009); Annemarie Warnkross (2000–2005); Myrthes Monteiro (2013–2014); Tracey Ellis (2013–2014); Maria Efeldt (2013–2014)
- Website: universal-music.de/bellini

Bellini is a German pop girl group formed in 1997. The group consists of the three members Dandara Santos-Silva, Lisa Frieg and Megan Sierz. They have been produced by the producer duo Ramon Zenker and Gottfried Engels, known as The Bellini Brothers. The group is named in remembrance of the Brazilian football legend, Hilderaldo Bellini.

== History ==
=== 1997–1998: Formation and Samba de Janeiro ===
The name "Bellini" itself was inspired by the surname of the former Brazilian national football team's captain Hilderaldo Bellini, who first brought his team to world championship in 1958. When they were looking for performers for the Bellini project, they compiled five members into a first mixed band, male dancer Mustafa Makhloufi (born 1974 or 1975 in Morocco) and four female dancers Tanja Niethen (born 1973 in Siegburg), Dandara Santos-Silva (born 1970 or 1971 in Brazil), Onni Khoei-Arsa (born 1974 or 1975 in Thailand) and Dewi Sulaeman (born 1979 or 1980 in Indonesia).

They released their first single "Samba de Janeiro", which heavily samples Airto Moreira's 1972 song "Tombo In 7/4" from his album Fingers, in May 1997. The song became a massive success, sold five million copies worldwide. In Germany the song peaked #2 in the German Single Chart and stayed in the top ten for thirteen weeks, earning the group an Echo Award for this song in the category "Artist or Group National in the rubric Dance/Techno. Soon after the release in summer of 1997, Makhloufi had been fired by the other members, leaving Bellini as a four piece girl group.

Both, the same titled debut studio album Samba de Janeiro, also known as Samba de Janeiro – The Album, and the second and final single release of the album, "Carnaval", became minor hits, only peaking #63 and #93 in the German Album und Single chart. The third single "Me Gusta la Vida" was released in 1998, first single to be released from their first compilation album Samba de Janeiro – Non-Stop Best of Bellini from 2001. In October 1998, Niethen and Santos-Silva left Bellini, to form the new girl group Bellissima with Mel Roberts from England.

=== 1999–2001: Samba de Janeiro – Non-Stop Best of Bellini ===
Also Sulaeman had to leave the band due to her pregnancy forcing last remaining member Khoei-Arsa to leave as well in 1999. Between 1999 and 2000, the producers held auditions in Cologne for three new dancers and singers to reform Bellini. First selections were Sabrina Schmieder, born 1980 in Salzburg, and Fabiana. In 1999, the second single of the compilation album Samba de Janeiro – Non-Stop Best of Bellini, titled "Saturday Night", a Whigfield cover, has been released, followed by the third and final single "Samba de Amigo".

=== 2002–2009: Lineup changes and singles ===
In 2000 and 2001, the single only releases "Arriba Allez" and "Brazil (en Fiesta)" followed, all which didn't chart, except "Brazil", peaking #71 in the German Single chart. Annemarie Warnkross joined in 2000 until 2005. Later Milena joined Bellini. Temporarily pop singer Emilia Rizzo was also a member of the band in 2004. In 2004, the two single only releases "Magalenha", a collaboration with the group Mendonça Do Rio, and "Tutti Frutti" have been published. Latter mentioned became a minor hit, peaking only #78 in the Swizz Single chart. In 2005 former member Niethen married Joey Kelly of the Kelly Family. In 2006 and 2007, remixes of "Samba de Janeiro" have been released and the song retitled "Let's Go to Rio", a Peter Allen cover version. In 2008 and 2010, another promotional singles "Hot, Hot, Hot", an Arrow cover version, and "Samba All Night", which samples "Samba de Janeiro", have been digitally released. In 2009, former member Sulaeman married tennis player Philipp Petzschner. Khoei-Arsa made an apprenticeship in physiotherapy and opened a beauty salon in Cologne. In 2009, the members of the band parted ways, Schmieder made an apprenticeship as a businesswoman for audiovisual Media. For 2010, a second Best of album and a reworked version of Samba de Janeiro, titled "Samba All Night", was planned, but was later scrapped for the second studio album. Only the single saw a promotional release.

=== 2013–present: Festival ===
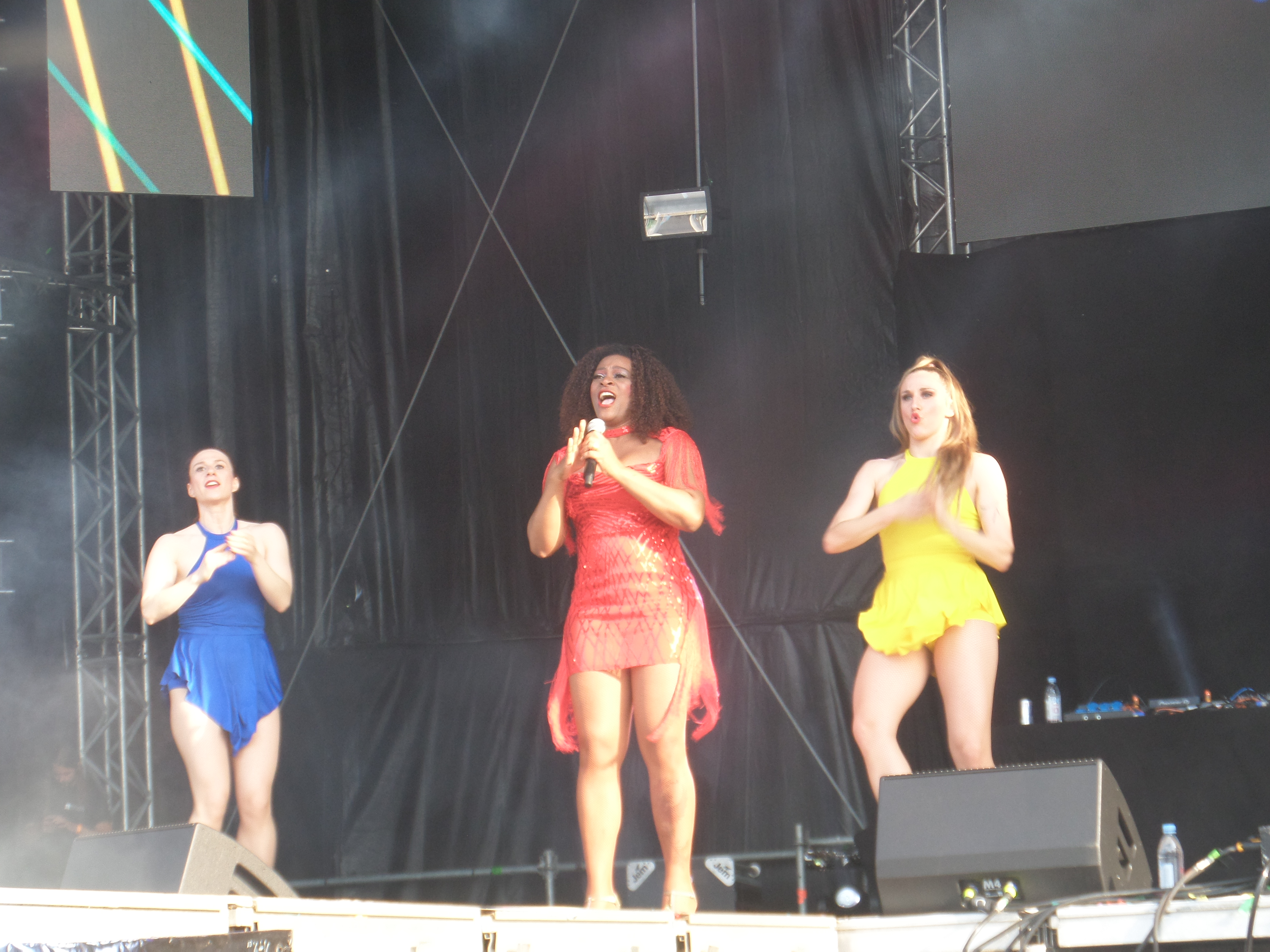
Bellini performing in 2019

After a short hiatus, in 2013, the producers compiled three new singers for the FIFA World Cup 2014 in Brazil, Maria Efeldt, a musical artist from Stage School in Hamburg, Tracey Ellis and Myrthes Monteiro (born in São Paulo and living in Berlin). Former member Schmieder started working as a real estate adviser in Berlin in 2013. The band had their premiere in April 2014 with a live performance at the ZDF-Fernsehgarten with the song "Tic, Tic Tac", a Chilli feat. Carrapicho cover version. In May 2014 the band released the single "Samba do Brasil", a Portuguese language reworked version of "Samba de Janeiro". The second studio album titled Festival was released in 2014.

In 2018, the band was revived again with a new line-up, consisting of original member Dandara Santos-Silva, and new members Lisa Frieg and Megan Sierz.

== Members ==
- Dandara Santos-Silva (1997–1998, 2018–present)
- Lisa Frieg (2018–present)
- Megan Sierz (2018–present)

=== Past members ===
1997–1999

- Onni Khoei-Arsa (1997–1999)
- Tanja Niethen (1997–1998)
- Dewi Sulaeman (1997–1998)
- Mustafa Makhloufi (1997)

1999–2009

- Sabrina Schmieder (1999–2009)
- Fabiana (1999–2003)
- Emilia Rizzo (2004–2004)
- Milena (2005–2009)
- Annemarie Warnkross (2000–2005)

2013–2014

- Myrthes Monteiro (2013–2014)
- Tracey Ellis (2013–2014)
- Maria Efeldt (2013–2014)

== Discography ==
- Samba de Janeiro (1997)
- Festival (2014)

== Awards ==
- Echo Award for "Samba de Janeiro" in the category "Artist or Group National in the rubric Dance/Techno (1997)
