= Kollegah discography =

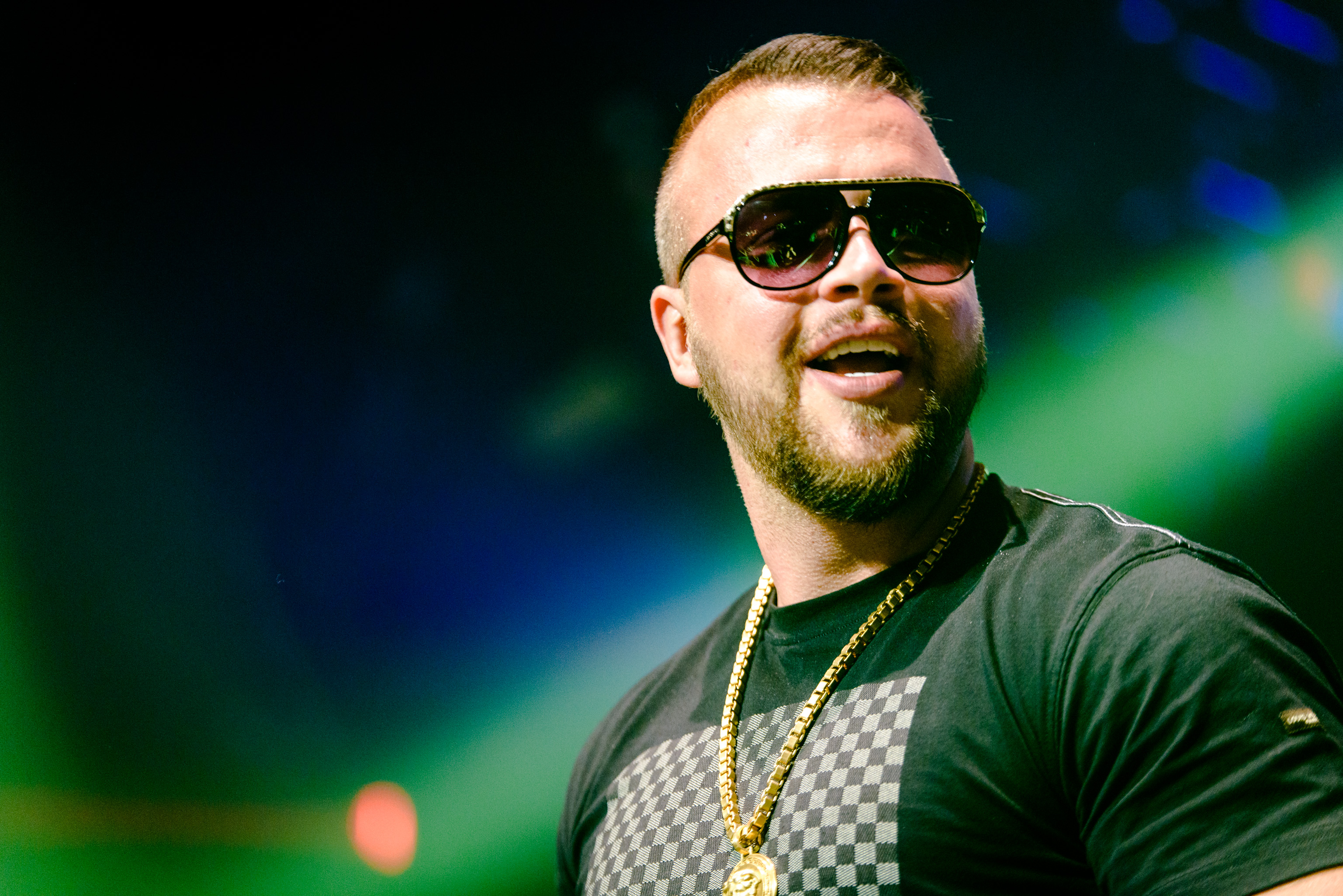
- Kollegah in June 2015
- Studio albums: 10
- Extended plays: 6
- Compilation albums: 2
- Singles: 66
- Mixtapes: 10
- Sampler: 3
- Collaborative albums: 5

German rapper Kollegah has released ten studio albums, ten mixtapes, six extended plays, three label samplers, two compilation albums, five collaborative albums and sixty-six singles. His debut album Alphagene (2007) entered the charts at number 51 in Germany. His follow-up eponymous 2008 record experienced similar moderate success. His fourth studio album Bossaura was released in October 2011 and peaked at number five in his native country. To date, the rapper has released three more albums: King (2014), Zuhältertape Volume 4 (2015) and Imperator (2016); both King and Imperator topped the album charts in German-speaking Europe and were certified gold and platinum in Germany and Austria.

Kollegah has worked with rapper Farid Bang on several collaborative albums. After releasing Jung, brutal, gutaussehend (2009) (Young, brutal, good-looking), the duo premiered a second album, Jung, brutal, gutaussehend 2 in 2013. It became Kollegah's first work to top the charts in Austria, Germany and Switzerland. Critically acclaimed, it was certified gold in Germany and Austria. Their follow-up record, Jung, brutal, gutaussehend 3, experienced similar success and attained gold status in Kollegah's native country eight days before to its release in December 2017. It spawned three singles, including the chart-topping "Sturmmaske auf (Intro)" and the top ten singles "Gamechanger" and "Ave Maria".

== Albums ==
=== Studio albums ===
List of studio albums, with chart positions, sales figures and certifications
| Title | Album details | Peak chart positions | | | Sales | Certifications |
| Title | Album details | GER | AUT | SWI | Sales | Certifications |
|---|---|---|---|---|---|---|
| Alphagene | Released: 16 November 2007; Label: Selfmade Records, Formats: CD, digital download | 51 | — | — | GER: 20,000 | |
| Kollegah | Released: 29 August 2008; Label: Selfmade Records; Formats: CD, digital download | 17 | 48 | — | | |
| Bossaura | Released: 14 October 2011; Label: Selfmade Records; Formats: CD, digital download | 5 | 19 | 14 | GER: 40,000 | |
| King | Released: 9 May 2014; Label: Selfmade Records; Formats: CD, digital download | 1 | 1 | 1 | GER: 300,000; AUT: 15,000 | BVMI: 3× Gold; IFPI AUT: Platinum |
| Zuhältertape Volume 4 | Released: 11 December 2015; Label: Selfmade Records; Formats: CD, digital download | 1 | 2 | 2 | GER: 200,000; AUT: 7,500 | BVMI: Platinum; IFPI AUT: Gold |
| Imperator | Released: 9 December 2016; Label: Alpha Music Empire; Formats: CD, digital download | 1 | 1 | 1 | GER: 100,000 | BVMI: Gold |
| Monument | Released: 7 December 2018; Label: Alpha Music Empire; Formats: CD, digital download | 1 | 1 | 1 | | |
| Alphagene II | Released: 13 December 2019; Label: Alpha Music Empire; Formats: CD, digital download | 1 | 7 | 3 | | |
| Zuhältertape, Vol. 5 | Released: 8 October 2021; Label: Alpha Music Empire; Formats: CD, digital download | 5 | 3 | 2 | | |
| La Deutsche Vita | Released: 7 July 2023; Label: Alpha Music Empire; Formats: CD, digital download | 1 | 10 | 6 | | |
| Still King | Released: 2 August 2024; Label: Alpha Music Empire; Formats: CD, digital download | 1 | 13 | 1 | | |
"—" denotes a recording that did not chart or was not released in that territory.

==== Collaborative albums ====
List of collaborative studio albums, with chart positions, sales figures and certifications
| Title | Album details | Peak chart positions | | | Sales | Certifications |
| Title | Album details | GER | AUT | SWI | Sales | Certifications |
|---|---|---|---|---|---|---|
| Jung, brutal, gutaussehend (with Farid Bang) | Released: 19 June 2009; Label: Selfmade Records; Formats: CD, digital download; Put on the Index in June 2012 | 30 | — | — | | |
| Jung, brutal, gutaussehend 2 (with Farid Bang) | Released: 8 February 2013; Label: Selfmade Records; Formats: CD, digital download; Put on the Index in February 2014 | 1 | 1 | 1 | GER: 150,000; AUT: 7,500 | BVMI: Gold; IFPI AUT: Gold |
| Jung, brutal, gutaussehend 3 (with Farid Bang) | Released: 1 December 2017; Label: Banger Musik, Alpha Music Empire, BMG; Formats: CD, digital download; Put on the Index in September 2018 | 1 | 1 | 1 | GER: 200,000; AUT: 7,500 | IFPI AUT: Gold |
| Platin war gestern (with Farid Bang) | Released: 10 August 2018; Label: Banger Musik, Alpha Music Empire, Groove Attack; Formats: CD, digital download | 1 | 1 | 1 | | |
| Natural Born Killas (with Asche) | Released: 22 January 2021; Label: Alpha Music Empire; Formats: CD, digital download | 1 | 3 | 13 | | |
"—" denotes a recording that did not chart or was not released in that territory.

=== Mixtapes ===
List of mixtapes
| Title | Album details |
|---|---|
| Zuhältertape | Released: 20 July 2005; Label: Independent; Formats: Free download |
| Zuhältertape (X-Mas Edition) | Released: 22 December 2005; Label: Selfmade Records; Formats: CD |
| Boss der Bosse | Released: 9 June 2006; Label: Selfmade Records; Formats: CD |
| Zuhältertape Volume 3 | Released: 19 December 2009; Label: Selfmade Records; Formats: CD |
| Hoodtape Volume 1 | Released: 14 August 2010; Label: Selfmade Records; Formats: CD |
| Hoodtape Volume 1 X-Mas Edition | Released: 18 December 2010; Label: Selfmade Records; Formats: CD |
| Hoodtape Volume 2 | Released: 9 December 2016; Label: Alpha Music Empire; Formats: CD |
| Golden Era Tourtape | Released: 14 July 2017; Label: Alpha Music Empire; Formats: CD |
| Tagteam Tape 2 | Released: 18 August 2017; Label: Alpha Music Empire; Formats: CD |
| Hoodtape Volume 3 | Released: 7 December 2018; Label: Alpha Music Empire; Formats: CD |

=== Compilation albums ===
List of compilation albums, with chart positions
| Title | Album details | Peak chart positions | | |
| Title | Album details | GER | AUT | SWI |
|---|---|---|---|---|
| Legacy | Released: 14 July 2017; Label: Selfmade Records; Formats: CD, digital download, Limited-Gold-Award | 2 | 8 | 11 |
| Freetracks Compilation (with Bosshafte Beats) | Released: 2 February 2018; Label: Alpha Music Empire; Formats: Digital download | — | — | — |
"—" denotes a recording that did not chart or was not released in that territory.

=== Sampler albums ===
List of sampler albums, with chart positions
| Title | Album details | Peak chart positions | | |
| Title | Album details | GER | AUT | SWI |
|---|---|---|---|---|
| Chronik 1 | Released: 6 July 2007; Label: Selfmade Records; Formats: CD, digital download | — | — | — |
| Chronik 2 | Released: 17 April 2009; Label: Selfmade Records; Formats: CD, digital download | 15 | 72 | — |
| Chronik 3 | Released: 9 October 2015; Label: Selfmade Records; Formats: CD, digital download | 1 | 2 | 3 |
"—" denotes a recording that did not chart or was not released in that territory.

== Extended plays ==
List of extended plays, with chart positions
| Title | EP details | Peak chart positions |
| Title | EP details | SWI |
|---|---|---|
| Mondfinsternis | Released: 30 September 2011; Label: Selfmade Records; Formats: Digital download | — |
| Bossaura Street-EP | Released: 29 December 2011; Label: Selfmade Records; Formats: Free download | — |
| Lost Tapes | Released: 11 December 2015; Label: Selfmade Records; Formats: CD | — |
| Street Stories EP | Released: 13 September 2017; Label: Selfmade Records; Formats: Streaming audio | — |
| §185 EP (with Farid Bang) | Released: 1 December 2017; Label: Banger Musik, Alpha Music Empire, BMG; Formats: CD | — |
| Nafri Trap EP, Vol. 1 (with Farid Bang) | Released: 29 June 2018; Label: Banger Musik, Alpha Music Empire, Groove Attack; Formats: Streaming audio | 48 |
"—" denotes a recording that did not chart or was not released in that territory.

== Singles ==
=== As lead artist ===
List of singles as lead artist, with chart positions
| Title | Year | Peak chart positions | | | Album |
| Title | Year | GER | AUT | SWI | Album |
|---|---|---|---|---|---|
| "Kuck auf die Goldkette" | 2007 | — | — | — | Alphagene |
| "Selfmade Endbosse" (featuring Favorite) | 2007 | — | — | — | Alphagene |
| "Big Boss" | 2008 | — | — | — | Kollegah |
| "Mitternacht" (with Farid Bang) | 2009 | — | — | — | Jung, brutal, gutaussehend |
| "Discospeed" (featuring Favorite) | 2010 | — | — | — | Hoodtape Volume 1 X-Mas Edition |
| "Flex, Sluts, Rock'n Roll" | 2011 | — | — | — | Bossaura |
| "Business Paris" (featuring Ol Kainry) | 2011 | — | — | — | Bossaura |
| "Bossaura" | 2011 | — | — | — | Bossaura |
| "Mondfinsternis" | 2011 | — | — | — | Bossaura |
| "Jetlag" | 2011 | — | — | — | Bossaura |
| "Drugs in den Jeans / Spotlight" | 2011 | — | — | — | Bossaura |
| "Dynamit" (with Farid Bang) | 2012 | 28 | 39 | 41 | Jung, brutal, gutaussehend 2 |
| "Drive-By" (with Farid Bang) | 2012 | 41 | — | — | Jung, brutal, gutaussehend 2 |
| "Du kennst den Westen" (with Farid Bang) | 2013 | 41 | 71 | — | Jung, brutal, gutaussehend 2 |
| "Stiernackenkommando" (with Farid Bang) | 2013 | 58 | — | — | Jung, brutal, gutaussehend 2 |
| "Alpha" | 2014 | 15 | 39 | 42 | King |
| "AKs Im Wandschrank" | 2014 | 21 | 42 | 41 | King |
| "Von Salat schrumpft der Bizeps" (with Majoe) | 2014 | — | — | — | Non-album singles |
| "Wat is' denn los mit dir" (with Majoe) | 2014 | 39 | — | — | Non-album singles |
| "King" | 2014 | 10 | 28 | 22 | King |
| "Du bist Boss" | 2014 | 36 | — | — | King |
| "Chronik III" (with Karate Andi and SSIO) | 2015 | 77 | — | — | Chronik 3 |
| "Keine neuen Freunde" | 2015 | 65 | — | — | Chronik 3 |
| "Genozid" | 2015 | 73 | 61 | — | Zuhältertape Vol. 4 |
| "John Gotti" | 2015 | 31 | — | — | Zuhältertape Vol. 4 |
| "Nero" | 2016 | 57 | 71 | — | Imperator |
| "Hardcore" | 2016 | 62 | 60 | — | Imperator |
| "Fokus" | 2016 | 80 | — | — | Imperator |
| "Pharao" | 2016 | 43 | — | 87 | Imperator |
| "Legacy" | 2017 | 51 | 68 | — | Legacy |
| "Millennium" | 2017 | — | — | — | Legacy |
| "Sturmmaske auf (Intro)" (with Farid Bang) | 2017 | 1 | 6 | 15 | Jung, Brutal, Gutaussehend 3 |
| "Zieh den Rucksack aus" (with Farid Bang) | 2017 | 4 | 12 | 35 | Nafri Trap EP, Vol. 1 |
| "Farid Ben & Friend (JBG3 Disstrack)" (with Farid Bang) | 2017 | 58 | — | — | Non-album single |
| "Gamechanger" (with Farid Bang) | 2017 | 6 | 16 | 24 | Jung, Brutal, Gutaussehend 3 |
| "Ave Maria" (with Farid Bang) | 2017 | 5 | 9 | 15 | Jung, Brutal, Gutaussehend 3 |
| "Die JBG3 Weihnachtsgeschichte" (with Farid Bang) | 2017 | — | — | — | Jung Brutal Gutaussehend 3 X-Mas Edition |
| "One Night Stand" (with Farid Bang) | 2017 | 51 | — | — | Jung Brutal Gutaussehend 3 New Year Edition and Nafri Trap EP, Vol. 1 |
| "All Eyez on Us" (with Farid Bang) | 2018 | 39 | 59 | 81 | Non-album singles |
| "Gigolo (Sommerhit)" (featuring DJ Arow) | 2018 | 90 | — | — | Non-album singles |
| "Real für die Fam" (with DJ Arow) | 2018 | — | — | — | Non-album singles |
| "Mitternacht 2" (with Farid Bang) | 2018 | 19 | 25 | 43 | Platin war gestern |
| "In die Unendlichkeit" (with Farid Bang featuring Musiye) | 2018 | 39 | 55 | 91 | Platin war gestern |
| "Wie ein Alpha" | 2018 | 26 | 32 | 61 | Monument |
| "Dear Lord" | 2018 | 48 | 58 | 98 | Monument |
| "Empire State of Grind" | 2018 | 90 | — | — | Hoodtape Volume 3 |
| "Push It to the Limit" | 2018 | 43 | 55 | 72 | Hoodtape Volume 3 |
| "Löwe" | 2018 | 36 | 45 | 56 | Monument |
| "Das erste Mal" (feat. 18 Karat) | 2018 | 32 | 33 | 58 | Monument |
| "Most Wanted" | 2018 | 60 | — | — | Monument |
| "Gospel" | 2018 | 46 | 74 | 94 | Monument |
| "Orbit" | 2018 | 65 | — | — | Monument |
| "Bullets" (with Asche) | 2019 | — | — | — | Alphagene II |
| "Alphagenetik" | 2019 | 17 | 24 | 37 | Alphagene II |
| "Valhalla" | 2019 | 54 | — | — | Alphagene II |
| "Money Stack$" (feat. Young Latino) | 2020 | 52 | — | — | Non-album singles |
| "Sinaloa" (with Fard and Asche) | 2020 | 38 | 62 | 76 | Non-album singles |
"—" denotes a recording that did not chart or was not released in that territory.

=== As featured artist ===
List of singles as featured artist, with chart positions
| Title | Year | Peak chart positions | | | Album |
| Title | Year | GER | AUT | SWI | Album |
|---|---|---|---|---|---|
| "Shotgun" (Favorite featuring Kollegah) | 2007 | — | — | — | Harlekin |
| "Gangsta Rap Kings" (Bushido featuring Kollegah and Farid Bang) | 2014 | 45 | 74 | — | Sonny Black |
| "King & Killa" (Farid Bang featuring Kollegah) | 2014 | 50 | 67 | — | Killa |
| "Kriminell und Asozial" (Al-Gear featuring Kollegah) | 2014 | — | — | — | Wieder mal angeklagt |
| "Egoist" (KC Rebell featuring Kollegah) | 2014 | 65 | — | — | Rebellution |
| "BADT" (Majoe featuring Farid Bang and Kollegah) | 2014 | 55 | 70 | — | Breiter als der Türsteher |
| "Jebemti Majku" (Farid Bang featuring Kollegah) | 2015 | — | — | — | Blut |
| "Raubtier" (Massiv featuring Kollegah and Farid Bang) | 2015 | — | — | — | Raubtier |
| "MP5" (Seyed featuring Kollegah) | 2016 | 70 | — | — | Engel mit der AK |
| "TelVision" (KC Rebell featuring PA Sports, Kianush and Kollegah) | 2016 | 40 | 52 | 94 | Abstand |
| "HSHC" (PA Sports featuring Kollegah) | 2017 | 89 | — | — | Verloren im Paradies |
| "Medusablick" (Jigzaw featuring Kollegah) | 2018 | 94 | — | — | Post mortem |
| "Public Enemies" (Farid Bang featuring Fler and Kollegah) | 2020 | 12 | 19 | 27 | Genkidama |
| "Mashkal" (Juri featuring Kollegah) | 2020 | 84 | — | — | Non-album single |
"—" denotes a recording that did not chart or was not released in that territory.

== Other charted songs ==
List of other charted songs, with chart positions
| Title | Year | Peak chart positions | | | Album |
| Title | Year | GER | AUT | SWI | Album |
|---|---|---|---|---|---|
| "Lamborghini Kickdown" | 2014 | 45 | — | — | King |
| "Karate" (featuring Casper) | 2014 | 46 | — | — | King |
| "Königsaura" | 2014 | 59 | — | — | King |
| "Cohibas, blauer Dunst" | 2014 | 61 | — | — | King |
| "Flightmode" | 2014 | 63 | — | — | King |
| "R.I.P." | 2014 | 75 | — | — | King |
| "Morgengrauen" | 2014 | 86 | — | — | King |
| "Sanduhr" (featuring Favorite) | 2014 | 91 | — | — | King |
| "Es ist Rap" (featuring Genetikk) | 2014 | 92 | — | — | King |
| "Rolex Daytona" (featuring The Game) | 2014 | 95 | — | — | King |
| "Universalgenie" | 2014 | 97 | — | — | King |
| "Schwarzer Benz" | 2014 | 98 | — | — | King |
| "Omega" | 2014 | 100 | — | — | King |
| "Red Light District Anthem" | 2015 | 68 | — | — | Chronik 3 |
| "Medusa" (with Farid Bang) | 2015 | 90 | — | — | Chronik 3 |
| "Empire Business" | 2015 | 32 | — | — | Zuhältertape Vol. 4 |
| "Blutdiamanten" | 2015 | 34 | — | — | Zuhältertape Vol. 4 |
| "Bye Bye Mr. President" | 2015 | 46 | — | — | Zuhältertape Vol. 4 |
| "Intro" | 2015 | 50 | — | — | Zuhältertape Vol. 4 |
| "Schusswaffengeräusche" | 2015 | 52 | — | — | Zuhältertape Vol. 4 |
| "Kool & the Gang" | 2015 | 56 | — | — | Zuhältertape Vol. 4 |
| "Pitbulls & AKs" | 2015 | 64 | — | — | Zuhältertape Vol. 4 |
| "Hoodtales IV" | 2015 | 65 | — | — | Zuhältertape Vol. 4 |
| "V.I.P.I.M.P." | 2015 | 67 | — | — | Zuhältertape Vol. 4 |
| "Kalter Krieg" | 2015 | 71 | — | — | Zuhältertape Vol. 4 |
| "Nebel" | 2015 | 75 | — | — | Zuhältertape Vol. 4 |
| "Wall Street" | 2015 | 79 | — | — | Zuhältertape Vol. 4 |
| "Tropische Tierpelze" | 2015 | 84 | — | — | Zuhältertape Vol. 4 |
| "Angeberprollrap Infinity (Outro)" | 2015 | 92 | — | — | Zuhältertape Vol. 4 |
| "Weißer Testarossa" | 2015 | 97 | — | — | Zuhältertape Vol. 4 |
| "Kaiseraura" | 2016 | 28 | 58 | 73 | Imperator |
| "American Express" (featuring Farid Bang) | 2016 | 29 | 62 | 61 | Imperator |
| "Aventador" | 2016 | 47 | — | — | Imperator |
| "Einer von Millionen" (featuring MoTrip) | 2016 | 53 | — | — | Imperator |
| "24 Karat" | 2016 | 56 | — | — | Imperator |
| "Pythonleder" (featuring KC Rebell) | 2016 | 60 | — | — | Imperator |
| "Rap Money" (featuring Summer Cem) | 2016 | 64 | — | — | Imperator |
| "Assassine" | 2016 | 66 | — | — | Imperator |
| "Cold Blooded" | 2016 | 69 | — | — | Imperator |
| "Schwarze Rosen" (featuring Ali As) | 2016 | 75 | — | — | Imperator |
| "Zeit" | 2016 | 79 | — | — | Imperator |
| "Siegerlächeln" | 2016 | 88 | — | — | Imperator |
| "Rapkoryphäe" | 2016 | 98 | — | — | Imperator |
| "Rap wieder Rap" (with Farid Bang) | 2017 | 7 | 19 | 22 | Jung Brutal Gutaussehend 3 |
| "Es wird Zeit" (with Farid Bang) | 2017 | 8 | 21 | 31 | Jung Brutal Gutaussehend 3 |
| "Studiogangster" (with Farid Bang) | 2017 | 13 | 31 | — | Jung Brutal Gutaussehend 3 |
| "Jung Brutal Gutaussehend 2017" (with Farid Bang) | 2017 | 16 | 34 | — | Jung Brutal Gutaussehend 3 |
| "Düsseldorfer" (with Farid Bang) | 2017 | 17 | 40 | — | Jung Brutal Gutaussehend 3 |
| "Wenn der Gegner am Boden liegt" (with Farid Bang) | 2017 | 19 | 37 | — | Jung Brutal Gutaussehend 3 |
| "Jagdsaison" (with Farid Bang) | 2017 | 22 | 42 | — | Jung Brutal Gutaussehend 3 |
| "Frontload" (with Farid Bang) | 2017 | 24 | 50 | — | Jung Brutal Gutaussehend 3 |
| "Eines Tages" (with Farid Bang) | 2017 | 25 | 46 | — | Jung Brutal Gutaussehend 3 |
| "Die letzte Gangsterrapcrew" (with Farid Bang) | 2017 | 26 | 56 | — | Jung Brutal Gutaussehend 3 |
| "Massephase" (with Farid Bang) | 2017 | 27 | 57 | — | Jung Brutal Gutaussehend 3 |
| "Warlordz" (with Farid Bang) | 2017 | 31 | 60 | — | Jung Brutal Gutaussehend 3 |
| "In jeder deutschen Großstadt" (with Farid Bang) | 2017 | 34 | 67 | — | Jung Brutal Gutaussehend 3 |
| "Älter brutaler skrupelloser (Outro)" (with Farid Bang) | 2017 | 38 | 72 | — | Jung Brutal Gutaussehend 3 |
| "G-Modelle" (with Farid Bang) | 2018 | 92 | — | — | Platin war gestern |
| "Nuklearer Winter" (with Farid Bang) | 2018 | 94 | — | — | Platin war gestern |
"—" denotes a recording that did not chart or was not released in that territory.

== Guest appearances ==
List of non-single guest appearances, showing other performing artists
| Title | Year | Other artist(s) | Album |
|---|---|---|---|
| "Immer Fly" | 2006 | Casper | Die Welt hört mich |
| "Ich Represente" | 2006 | DeineLtan | Kopfschuss |
| "Bossrap" | 2007 | Favorite | Harlekin |
| "Ghettoboyz" | 2008 | Favorite | Anarcho |
| "30" | 2008 | Favorite | Anarcho |
| "Straße 2" | 2008 | Casper | Hin zur Sonne |
| "Chopperz" | 2008 | Jason | Status: Ballin |
| "Kreideumriss" | 2009 | Sinan-G | Ich bin Jesse James |
| "Leichathlet" | 2009 | Animus | Der Kugel Schreiber Teil 3 |
| "Straßenapotheker 2,5" | 2009 | Morbid | Killerspiele |
| "Bossrapper 2" | 2009 | Chissmann | Ganz normal |
| "Ey Yo" | 2010 | Farid Bang | Asphalt Massaka 2 |
| "Discobitch" | 2010 | DJ Tomekk & Toony, Farid Bang | Ehrenkodex |
| "Bamm City" | 2010 | Migo | Riggedi Rawtakes Vol.2 |
| "Rotlichtmilieu" | 2010 | Haftbefehl, Farid Bang | Azzlack Stereotyp |
| "Von Boss zu Boss" | 2010 | Affenboss | Arschlochalarm EP |
| "Katapult" | 2010 | Summer Cem | Feierabend |
| "Terrorbars Infinity" | 2010 | Fard, Farid Bang, Summer Cem, Snaga | Alter Ego |
| "Pyramide" | 2011 | Favorite | Christoph Alex |
| "Sie hassen uns immer noch" | 2011 | Toony | Over the Top Reloaded |
| "The Business" | 2012 | Moneyrain | Moneyrain Entertainment Vol. 1 |
| "Stripclub" | 2012 | Moneyrain | Moneyrain Entertainment Vol. 1 |
| "Last Action Hero (Remix)" | 2012 | Celo & Abdi | Hinterhofjargon |
| "Partyschiffpirat" | 2012 | Get No Sleep Collective | Partyschiffpirat |
| "A La Muerte" | 2013 | Genetikk | D.N.A. |
| "Katapult 2" | 2013 | Summer Cem, RAF Camora | Babas, Barbies & Bargeld |
| "Kollegah und der Boss" | 2013 | Jewlz da Hoodwatcha | Detox |
| "Fack Ju" | 2014 | Farid Bang | Killa |
| "Business Waffendeals" | 2014 | Amok & Omega | None |
| "Training Day" | 2014 | Koree, DJ Arrow | #UDED |
| "Muskulöse Übernahme" | 2014 | Majoe | BADT |
| "Hidden Track" | 2014 | Majoe | BADT |
| "Bosshaft Unterwegs" | 2014 | Majoe | BADT |
| "Alle meine Fans" | 2014 | Shindy | FVCKB!TCHE$GETMONE¥ |
| "Dschungelabenteuer" | 2015 | Prinz Porno | pp = mc2 |
| "Selfmade Legenden" | 2015 | Favorite | Neues von Gott |
| "Euphoria" | 2016 | Ali As | Euphoria |
| "Schlangen" | 2016 | Seyed | Engel mit der AK |
| "Alpha ist Imperium" | 2016 | Seyed | Engel mit der AK |
| "Wir bangen die Szene" | 2016 | Seyed | Engel mit der AK |
| "Gun im Schritt" | 2016 | Seyed | Engel mit der AK |
| "All the Way Up (Official Remix)" | 2016 | Fat Joe, Farid Bang, Seyed, Summer Cem, Infared | None |
| "Ich will mehr" | 2017 | Majoe | Auge des Tigers |
| "Stalin" | 2017 | Kurdo, Farid Bang | Vision |
| "Asche auf Balmain" | 2017 | Ali As | Insomia |
| "On Fire" | 2017 | Seyed | Cold Summer |
| "Bordstein Westfalen" | 2017 | Eko Fresh, Farid Bang, Deemah | König von Deutschland |

== Music videos ==
=== As lead artist ===
List of music videos as lead artist, showing directors
| Title | Year | Director(s) |
|---|---|---|
| "Kuck auf die Goldkette" | 2007 | Unknown (Note: The music videos for "Dynamit", "Drive–By", "Stiernackenkommando" and "Du kennst den Westen" were deleted in 2014 after the Federal Department for Media Harmful to Young Persons put Jung, brutal, gutaussehend 2 on the Index.) |
| "Selfmade Endbosse" (featuring Favorite) | 2008 | Unknown |
| "Big Boss" | 2008 | Unknown |
| "Mittelfinger hoch" (with Casper & Favorite) | 2009 | Unknown |
| "Discospeed" | 2010 | Unknown |
| "Drugs in den Jeans / Spotlight" | 2011 | Unknown |
| "Kobrakopf" (featuring Farid Bang & Haftbefehl) | 2011 | Unknown |
| "Jetlag" | 2011 | Unknown |
| "Business Paris" (featuring Ol Kainry) | 2011 | Unknown |
| "Du" (featuring Sahin) | 2011 | Unknown |
| "Mondfinsternis" | 2011 | Unknown |
| "Dynamit" | 2012 | Unknown |
| "Drive–By" | 2012 | Unknown |
| "Stiernackenkommando" | 2012 | Unknown |
| "Du kennst den Westen" | 2012 | Unknown |
| "NWO" | 2013 | Alexander von Koenichstheyn |
| "Alpha" | 2014 | Markus & Michael Weicker |
| "Von Salat schrumpft der Bizeps" (with Majoe; featuring Die Götzfried Girls) | 2014 | Unknown |
| "Ghettoworkout" (with Majoe) | 2014 | Justin Braun |
| "Wat is' denn los mit dir" (with Majoe) | 2014 | Alexander von Koenichstheyn |
| "AKs im Wandschrank" | 2014 | Markus & Michael Weicker |
| "King" | 2014 | Unknown |
| "Du bist Boss" | 2014 | Daniel Zlotin |
| "Universalgenie" | 2014 | Tony Salah, Sammy Malas |
| "Das hat mit HipHop nichts zu tun" | 2014 | Alexander von Koenichstheyn |
| "Bosstransformation" | 2014 | Unknown |
| "Dschungelabentueuer" (with Prinz Porno) | 2015 | Unknown |
| "Keine neuen Freunde" | 2015 | Unknown |
| "Genozid" | 2015 | Unknown |
| "John Gotti" | 2015 | Markus & Michael Weicker |
| "Nero" | 2016 | Unknown |
| "Hardcore" | 2016 | Unknown |
| "Fokus" | 2016 | Daniel Zlotin |
| "Pharao" | 2016 | Daniel Zlotin |
| "Einer von Millionen" (featuring Motrip) | 2016 | Daniel Zlotin |
| "Apokalypse" | 2016 | Alexander von Koenichstheyn |
| "Voulez Vous coucher avec MOIS" (featuring Ali As, Seyed & Pretty Mo) | 2017 | Farhad Tahir |
| "24 Karat (Remix)" (featuring Ali As & Seyed) | 2017 | Farhad Tahir |
| "Guccisandalen" (featuring Ali As & Seyed) | 2017 | Unknown |
| "Bitch wir sind Alpha" (featuring Ali As & Seyed) | 2017 | Farhad Tahir |
| "Sturmmaske auf" (with Farid Bang) | 2017 | Shaho Casado |
| "Zieh den Rucksack aus" (with Farid Bang) | 2017 | Bilal Hadzic |
| "Gamechanger" (with Farid Bang) | 2017 | Shaho Casado |
| "Ave Maria" (with Farid Bang) | 2017 | Shaho Casado |
| "All Eyez on us" (with Farid Bang) | 2018 | Shaho Casado |
| "Real für die Fam" (featuring DJ Arrow) | 2018 | Bilal Hadzic |
| "Mitternacht 2" (with Farid Bang) | 2018 | Andrijano Ajzi |
| "In die Unendlichkeit" (with Farid Bang featuring Musiye) | 2018 | Edin Dzinic |
| "Wie ein Alpha" | 2018 | Art Davis |
| "Dear Lord" | 2018 | Adam Film |
| "Empire State of Grind" | 2018 | Ondro |
| "Push it to the Limit" | 2018 | Philip Hartung |
| "Löwe" | 2018 | Francisco Gonzalez Sendin |
| "Das Erste Mal" (featuring 18 Karat) | 2018 | Art Davis |
| "Most Wanted" | 2018 | Phillip Hartung |

=== As featured artist ===
List of music videos as featured artist, showing directors
| Title | Year | Director(s) |
|---|---|---|
| "Shotgun" (Favorite featuring Kollegah) | 2007 | Unknown (Note: The music video for "Gangsta Rap Kings" was deleted in 2015 after the Federal Department for Media Harmful to Young Persons put Sonny Black by Bushido on the Index.) |
| "Soldiers" (Eurogang featuring Kollegah) | 2010 | Unknown |
| "Massaka Kokain 2" (Massiv featuring Kollegah & Farid Bang) | 2011 | Unknown |
| "Gangsta Rap Kings" (Bushido featuring Kollegah & Farid Bang) | 2014 | Unknown |
| "King & Killa" (Farid Bang featuring Kollegah) | 2014 | Daniel Zlotin |
| "Kriminell und Asozial" (Al-Gear featuring Kollegah) | 2014 | Unknown |
| "Egoist" (KC Rebell featuring Kollegah & Majoe) | 2014 | Daniel Zlotin |
| "BADT" (Majoe featuring Kollegah & Farid Bang) | 2014 | Daniel Zlotin |
| "Jebemti Majku" (Farid Bang featuring Kollegah) | 2015 | Eif Rivera |
| "MP5" (Seyed featuring Kollegah) | 2016 | Alexander von Koenichstheyn |
| "TelVision" (KC Rebell featuring PA Sports, Kianush & Kollegah) | 2016 | Shaho Casado |
| "HS.HC" (PA Sports featuring Kollegah) | 2017 | Shaho Casado |
