= Elvir Omerbegovic =

German entrepreneur of Bosnian descent (born 1979)

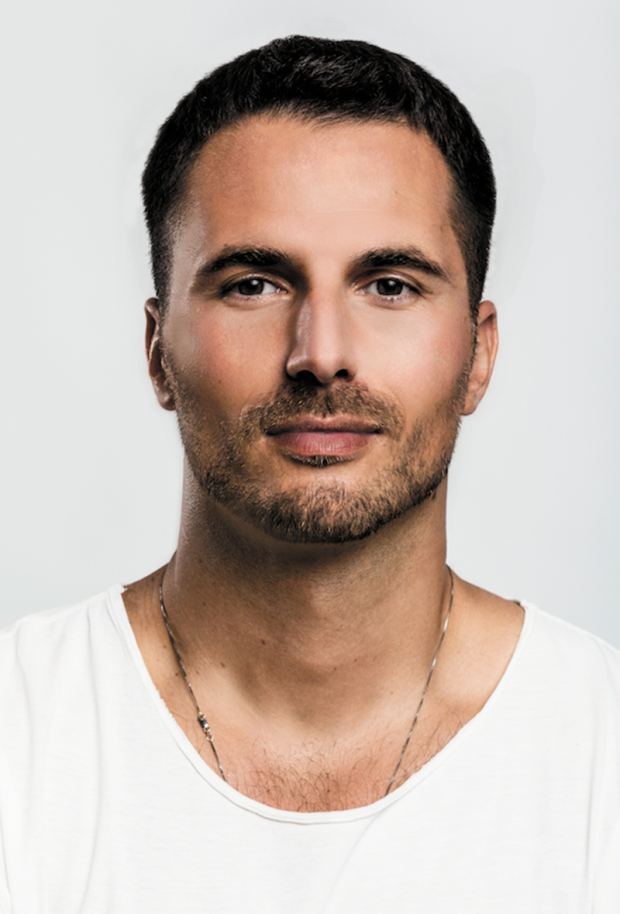
- Born: 1979 (age 46–47); Mettmann, West Germany
- Occupation: Entrepreneur
- Known for: Founder of Selfmade Records

Elvir Omerbegovic (born 1979) is a German entrepreneur of Bosnian descent who is mainly known as the founder and CEO of the hip hop label Selfmade Records and as President of Rap of Universal Music Germany. He is also the founder of the clothing label Pusher Apparel and the co-founder of Suckit.

== Early life and career ==
Omerbegovic was born in Mettmann, West Germany in 1979, the son of Bosnian immigrants. At the age of 12, he began to play streetball and won the German championship with his team several times. From 1993 onwards, he performed his sport semi-professionally, playing for Bayer Giants Leverkusen and Brandt Hagen. At the age of 16, he competed against Amateur Athletic Union teams in New York as a member of a selected squad. Prior to finishing high school in Germany, he also played basketball at a high school in Kentucky for one season. Upon graduation, Omerbegovic worked for RTL Newmedia in Cologne, Germany. He then earned a bachelor's degree in political science, media and sociology. Subsequently, he received a master's degree in political communication.

In 1999, he met Philipp Dammann during a community service training in Herdecke. Dammann, alias Flipstar, was a member of the hip hop group Creutzfeld & Jakob. Omerbegovic then began to appear as a rapper under the artist name "Slick One". Flipstar also provided Omerbegovic with initial contacts in the German hip hop scene. In 2003, Omerbegovic was featured in the song "Game Over" for the first time on the Creutzfeld & Jakob album Zwei Mann gegen den Rest. In 2005, he recorded some songs in collaboration with Flipstar. "Wo ich herkomm" was used as one of the tracks for the sampler Schwarzes Gold. Within the next two years, he recorded contributions to five releases by Selfmade Records. On the track "Bruderkrieg", a collaboration with Edo Maajka on the album Chronik 2 in 2009, Omerbegovic appeared as a rapper for the last time.

== Business career ==
=== Selfmade Records ===
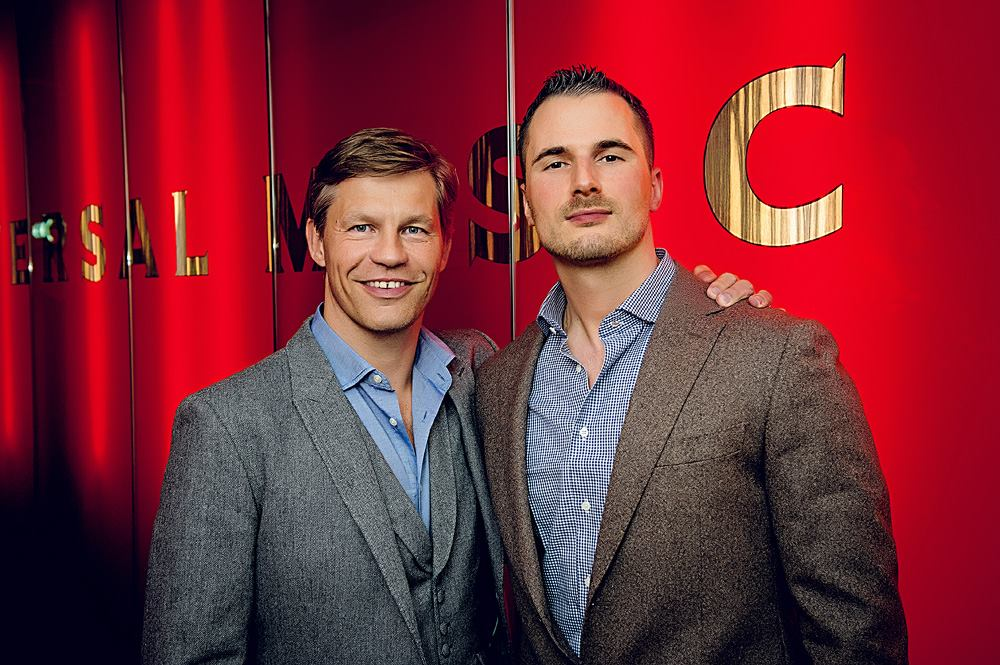
Omerbegovic (right) with Frank Briegmann in 2014

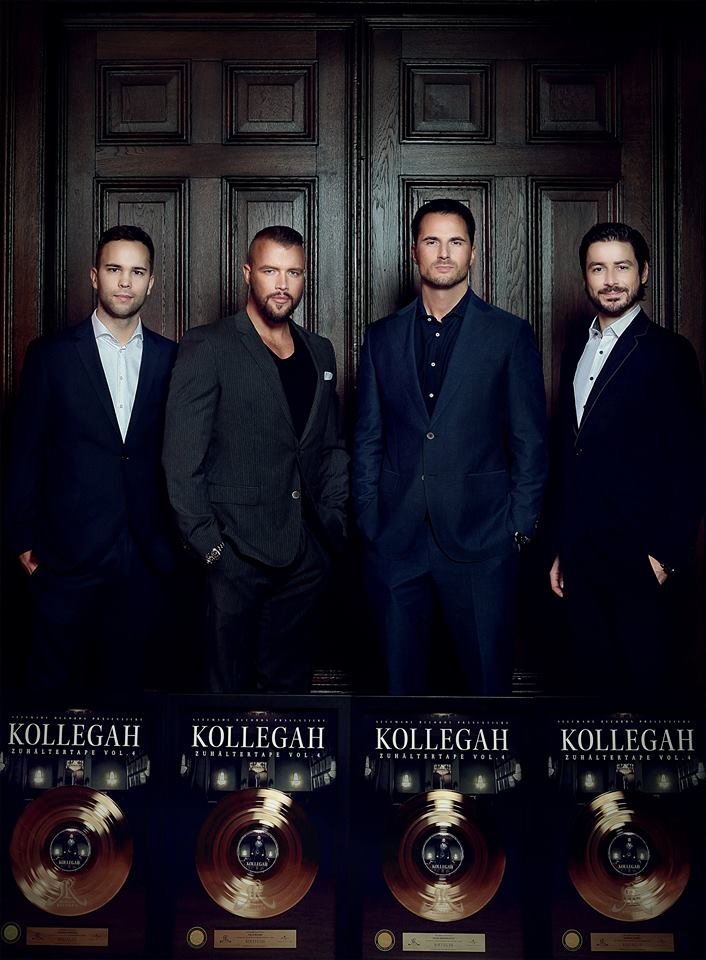
Thomas Burkholz, Kollegah, Omerbegovic and Markus Huber at the gold record certification of "Zuhältertape Volume 4"

After the cancellation of the contract between Universal Music and the duo Creutzfeld & Jakob in 2005, Omerbegovic moved from Cologne to Bochum to establish a music label with Philipp Dammann under the name Selfmade Records. Initially, the label was only supposed to serve as a platform for Dammann's releases as "Flipstar", as well as for other hip hop acts in the region. Following a short-term cooperation with Jan Mehlhose from the sub-label Subword, Omerbegovic arranged a distribution agreement with Groove Attack. At this point, producer Rizbo and rapper Favorite from the city of Essen had already been signed as the label's first artists. In April 2005, the sampler Schwarzes Gold was released as the first Selfmade Records production. Over the course of the year, Shiml and Kollegah also received contracts as artists. With respect to his selection of rappers, Omerbegovic explained that it was his "intention to sign and develop artists who [...] have outstanding technical skills and brought something entirely new to the German hip hop scene."

At the end of 2005, Dammann left the music label and Omerbegovic took over single-handedly. Due to its infrastructural advantages, he relocated the Selfmade Records headquarters to Düsseldorf in 2007. In addition to his work as label manager, Omerbegovic also took over the positions of product and tour manager. In addition, he helped with the production of the releases, "subtly influencing the albums" by suggesting the modification of sounds, lyrics or selected verses. In 2007, Alphagene by Kollegah was the label's first album to enter the German charts. In the following two years, the label achieved similar successes with Favorite and Shiml. In 2009, another rapper by the name of Casper was signed. Selfmade Records presented Casper as part of the sampler Chronik 2. In the following months, the contractual collaboration with Shiml and Casper was terminated. At the end of 2011 and at the beginning of 2012, the hip hop groups Genetikk and 257ers were presented as new additions to the label, respectively.

The release of the album Jung, brutal, gutaussehend 2 by Kollegah and Farid Bang in 2013 marked the first time a Selfmade Records album entered the charts at the number one spot. After the album went gold, Universal Music contacted Omerbegovic to discuss a potential collaboration. He initially refused the offer and instead extended the distribution agreement with Groove Attack. After another successful release, namely Genetikk's album D.N.A., various labels approached Selfmade Records.

In early 2014, a joint venture with Universal Music was finally announced. According to Omerbegovic, the advantage of this cooperation lies in the ability to "operate with the speed of an indie label and the power of a major label." His major label counterpart was Frank Briegmann, President Central Europe of Universal Music Group International, as well as the Deutsche Grammophon. By means of the contract with Universal Music, Omerbegovic received the position of "President of Rap Selfmade Records and Universal Music Germany".

The label's next releases, i.e., King, Boomshakkalakka, Neues von Gott, Achter Tag and Zuhältertape Volume 4, all ranked number one in the German charts as well. In mid-2014, rapper Karate Andi was signed as an artist. At the end of 2015, Selfmade Records presented Karate Andi to a larger audience through his appearances on the sampler Chronik 3. Like the previous albums, the sampler also rose to the top of the charts. Omerbegovic used the release of Chronik 3 for a review of the ten-year history of his record label. He appeared as the editor of the book Selfmade Records – Die ersten 10 Jahre des erfolgreichsten HipHop-Labels.

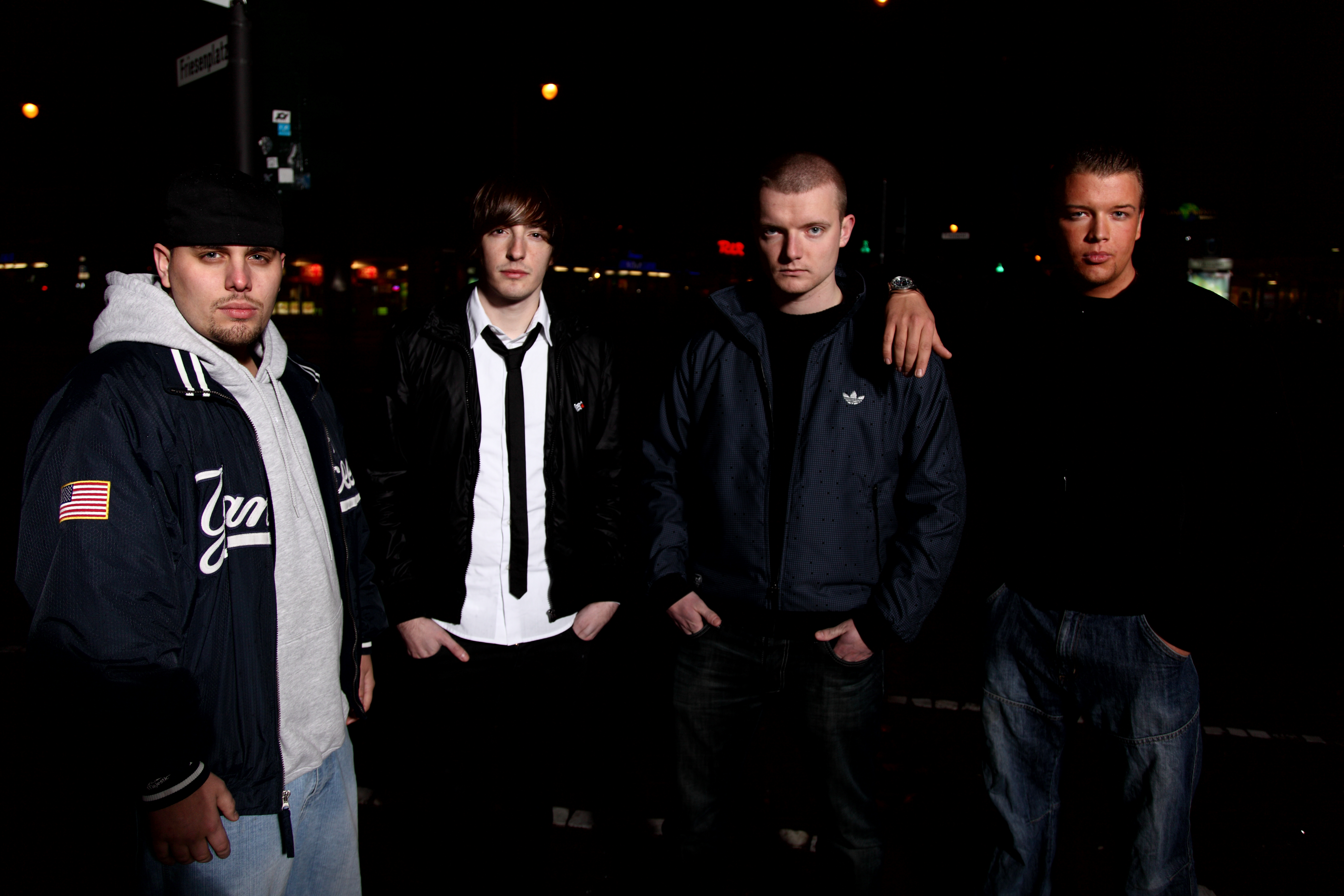
The artist of Selfmade Records in 2009: Favorite, Casper, Shiml and Kollegah

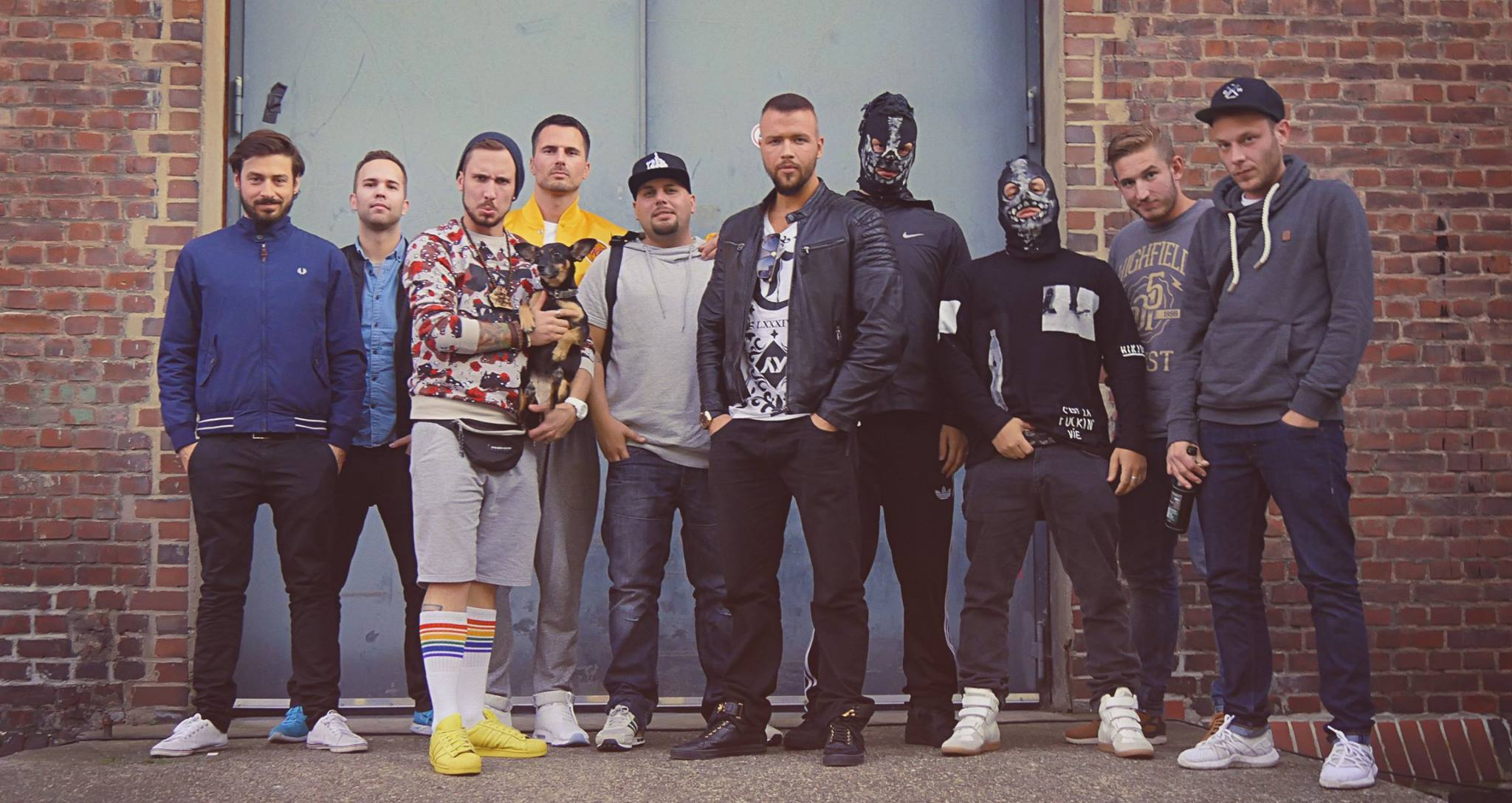
Markus Huber, Thomas Burkholz, 257ers, Omerbegovic, Favorite, Kollegah and Genetikk (2015)

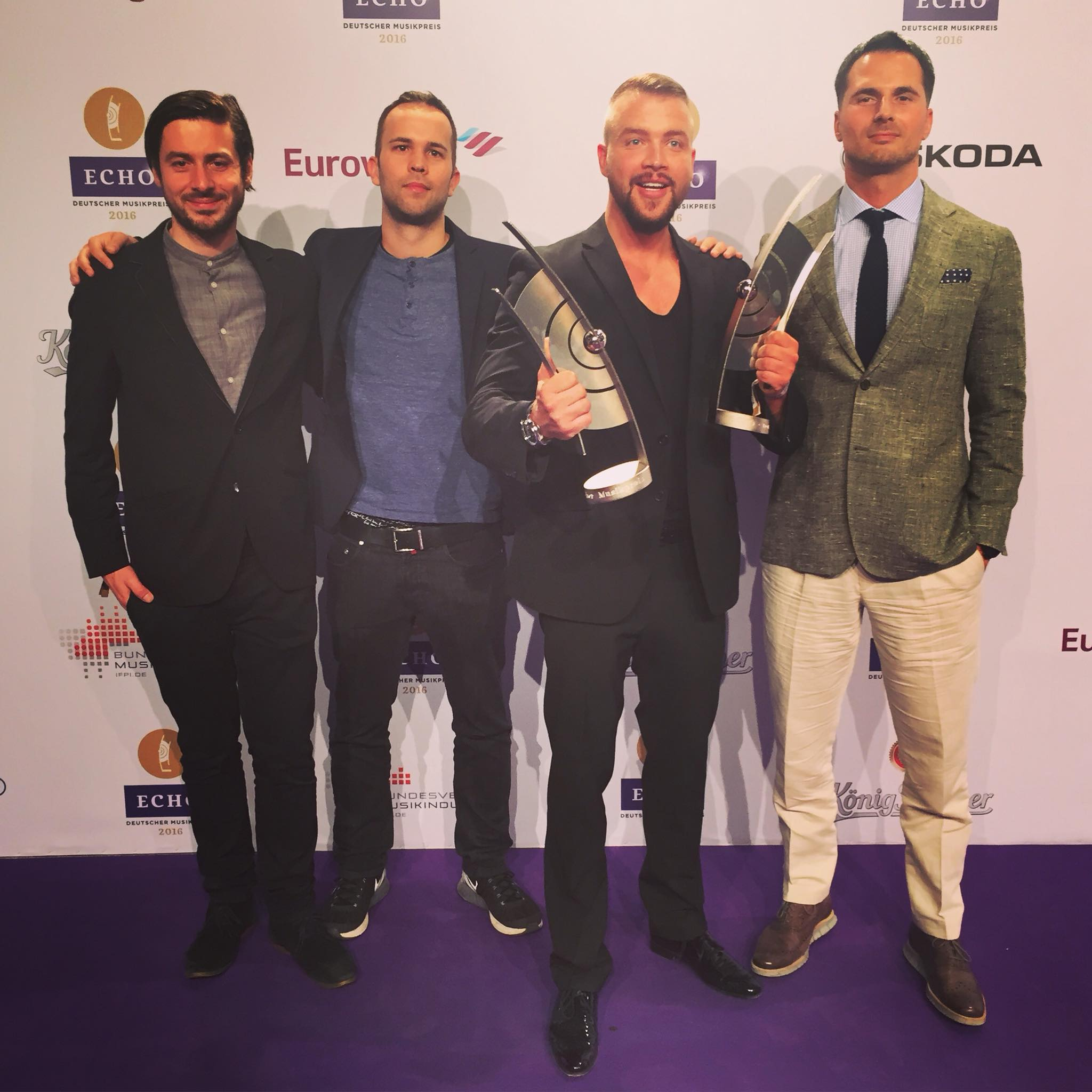
Markus Huber, Thomas Burkholz, Kollegah and Omerbegovic at the Echo Music Prize 2016

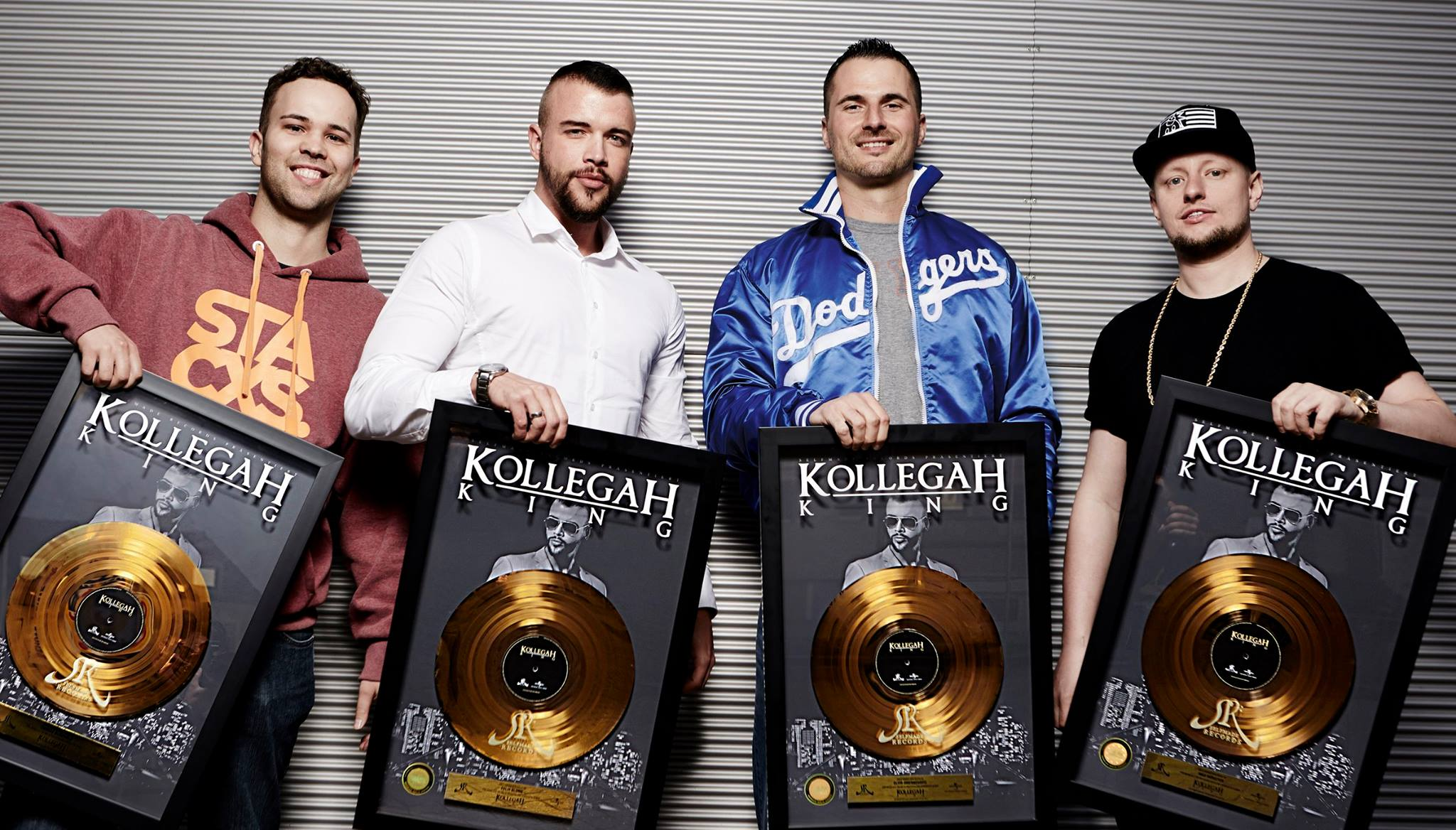
Thomas Burkholz, Kollegah, Omerbegovic and Max Mönster at the gold record certification of "King"

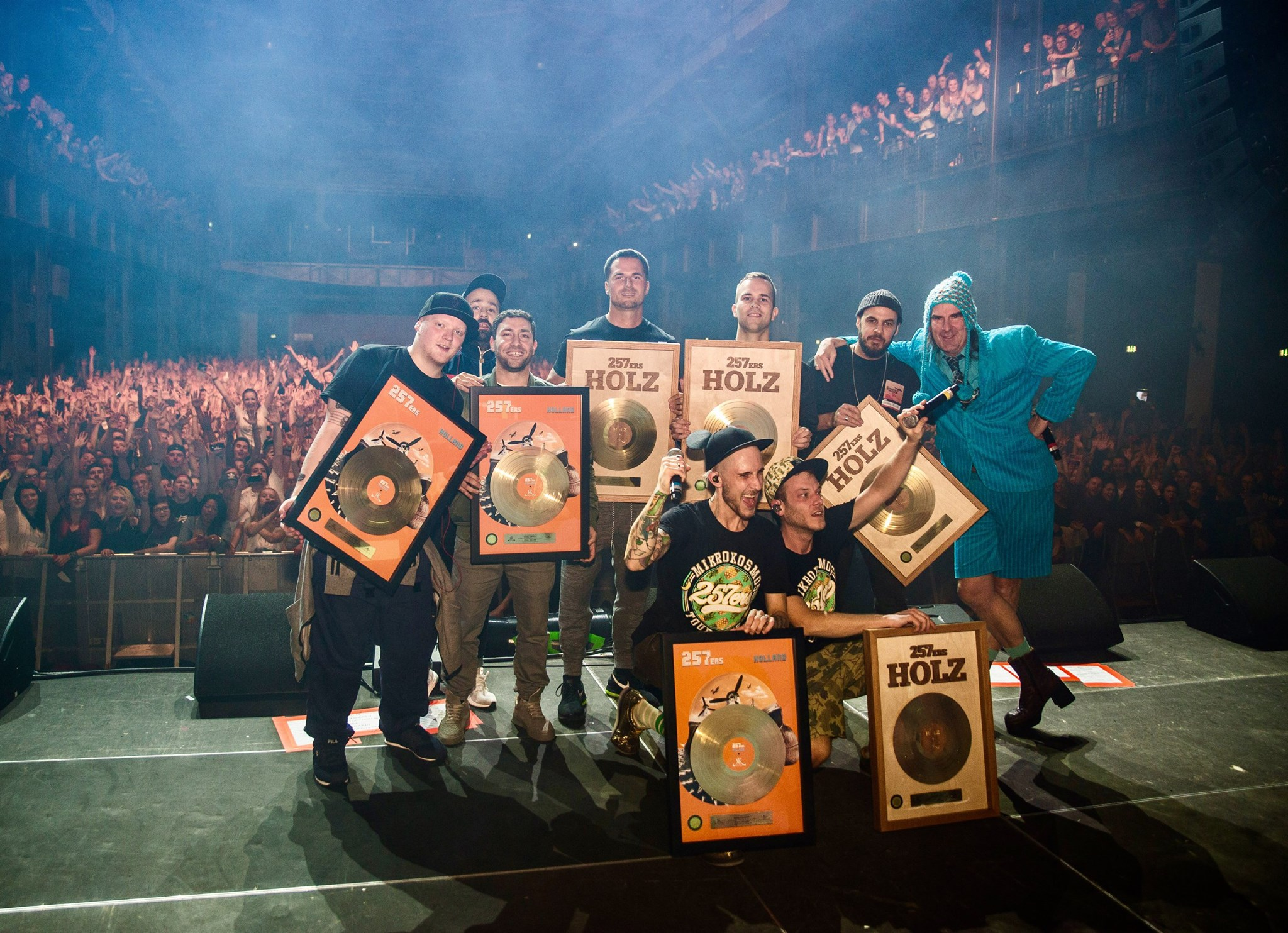
Gold record certification of the singles "Holland" and "Holz"

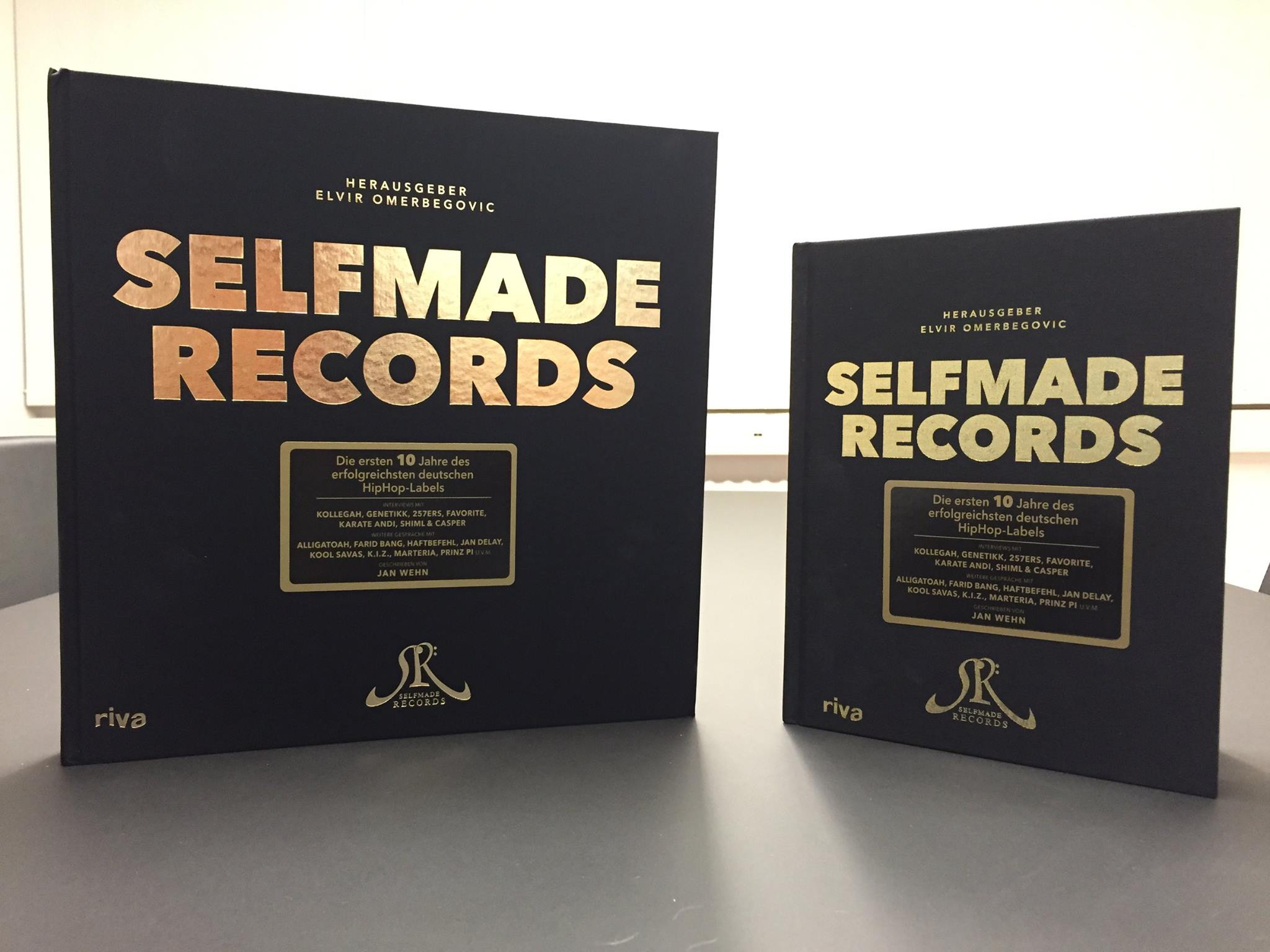
Book cover of "Selfmade Records – Die ersten 10 Jahre des erfolgreichsten HipHop-Labels" ("The first 10 years of the most successful hip hop label")

=== Pusher Apparel ===
At the end of May 2009, Omerbegovic founded the fashion label Pusher Apparel. That same year, the new fashion label's products were integrated in the marketing efforts of the album Jung, brutal, gutaussehend, with rappers Kollegah and Farid Bang presenting the label's products in their music videos, press photos, and on pictures in the album's booklet. Pusher Apparel is part of the network of the Bravado Merchandise GmbH, a sub company of Universal Music Group, and is run by Frank Briegmann. The label's product line primarily targets sporty male clients between 13 and 28 years of age. Sales are exclusively made via the company's online shop. In June 2016, rappers Gzuz and Bonez MC of the 187 Strassenbande signed a cooperation agreement with Pusher Apparel. At the same time, Gzuz and Bonez MC released their first streetwear collection through the label.

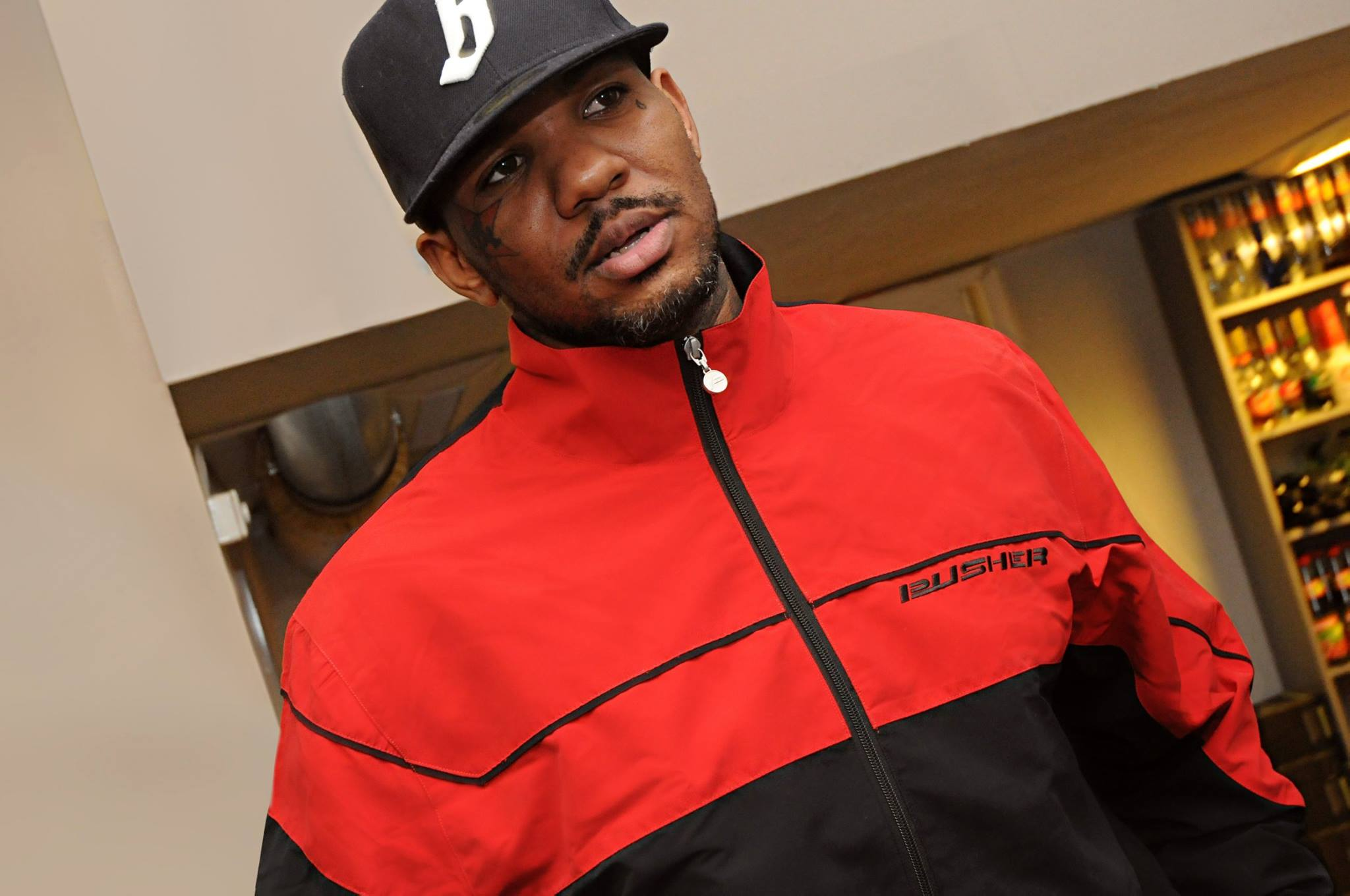
The Game (2011)

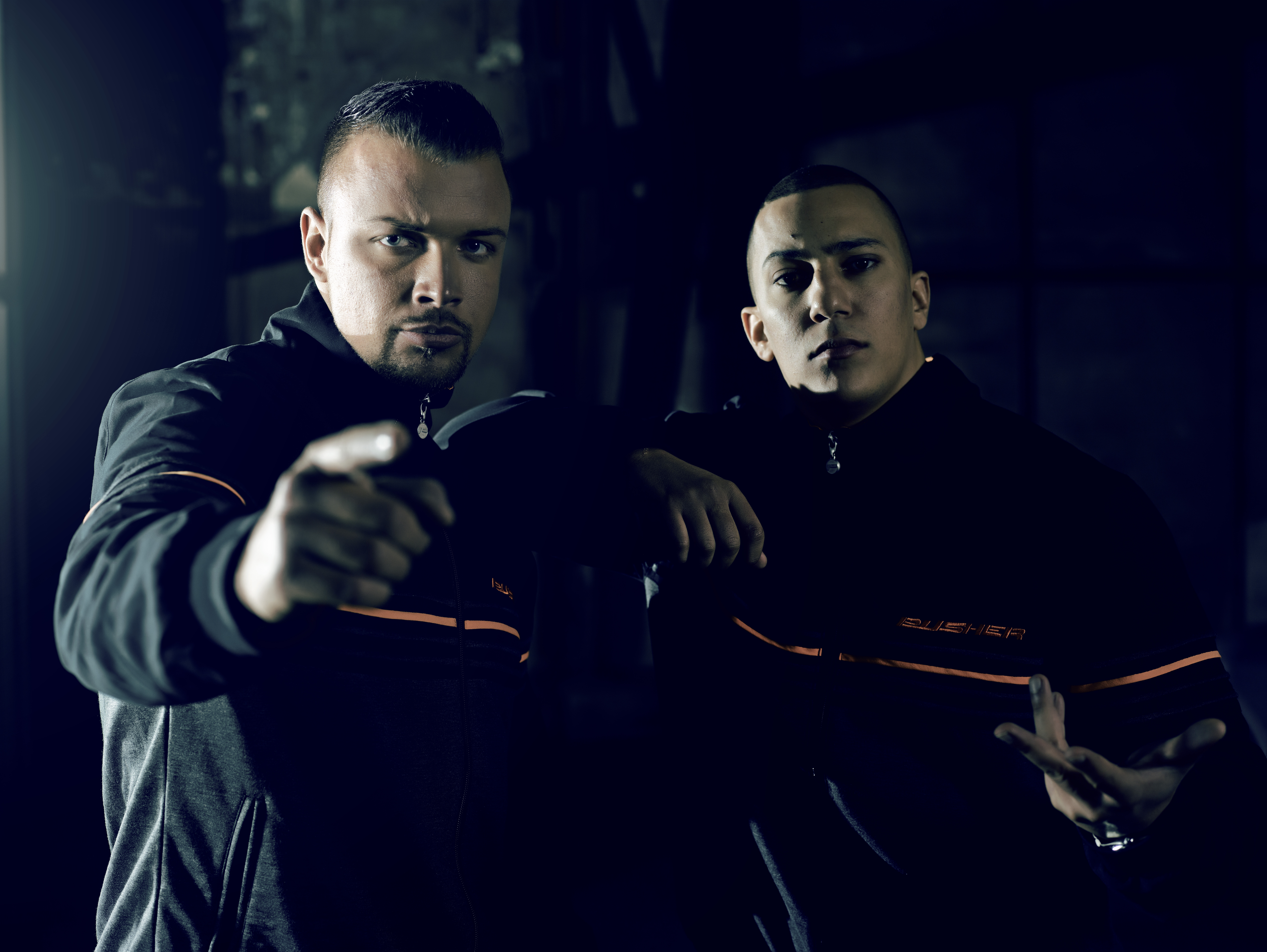
Kollegah and Farid Bang (2012)

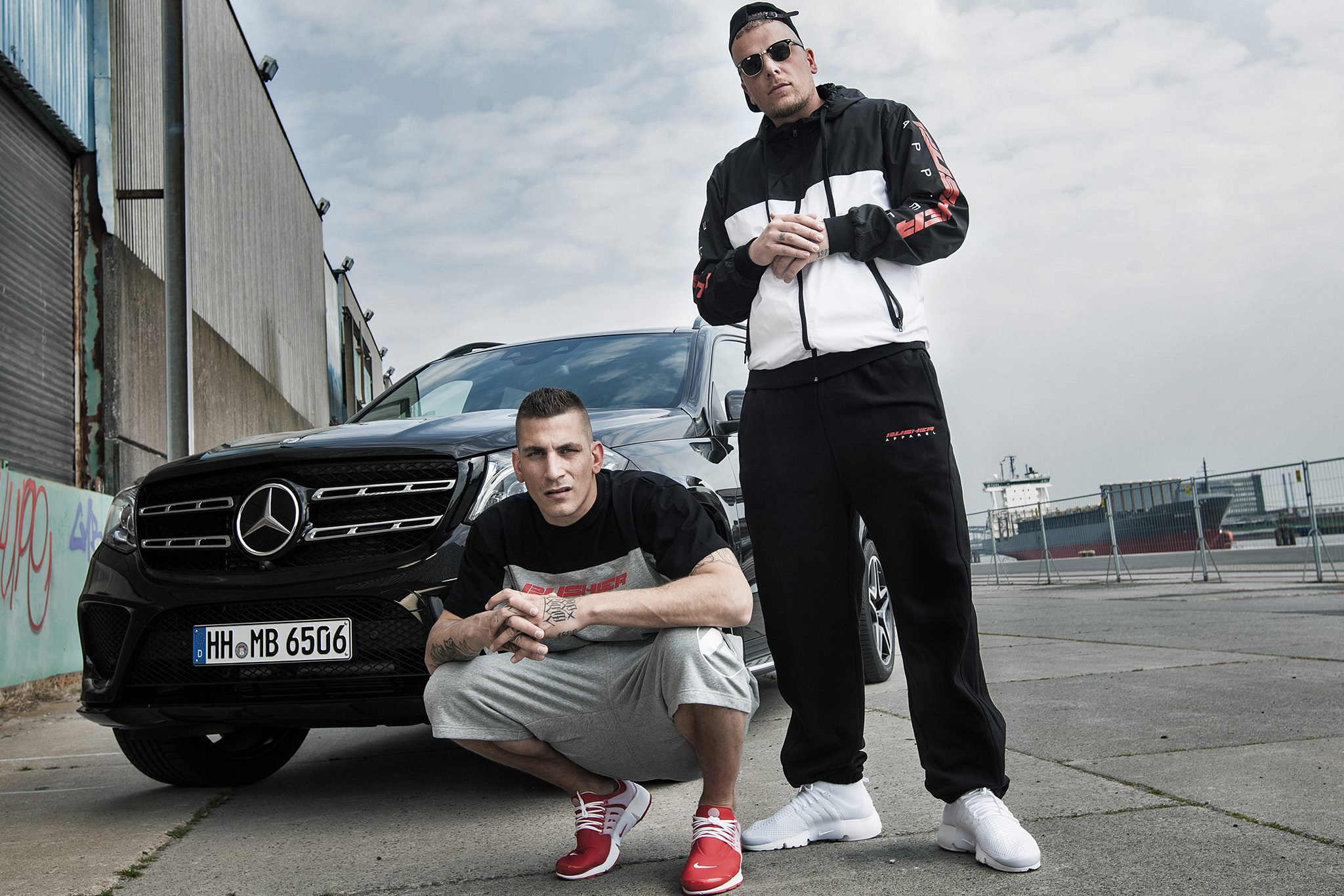
Gzuz and Bonez MC (2016)

=== Suckit ===
In early 2014, Omerbegovic and Maximilian Scharpenack founded the Suckit GmbH, together with Marco Knauf and Inga Koster, founders of the company true fruits. Suckit specializes in the production of alcoholic ice pops. Shortly after sales started through the company's website in April 2014, Suckit was able to sell 30,000 units of its products. By now, the product is present on the shelves of numerous supermarkets. According to Suckit, 750,000 units of ice were sold in the first two years, of which 500,00 were sold in 2015. In 2016, 1.4 million units were sold. In October 2016, the company was featured in the show Die Höhle der Löwen. However, the investors involved refrained from acquiring business shares. So far, MoTrip, Marteria, Farid Bang, KC Rebell, Schwesta Ewa, 257ers, Favorite, Joko Winterscheidt, Klaas Heufer-Umlauf, and Micaela Schäfer had appearances with the product.

== Awards ==
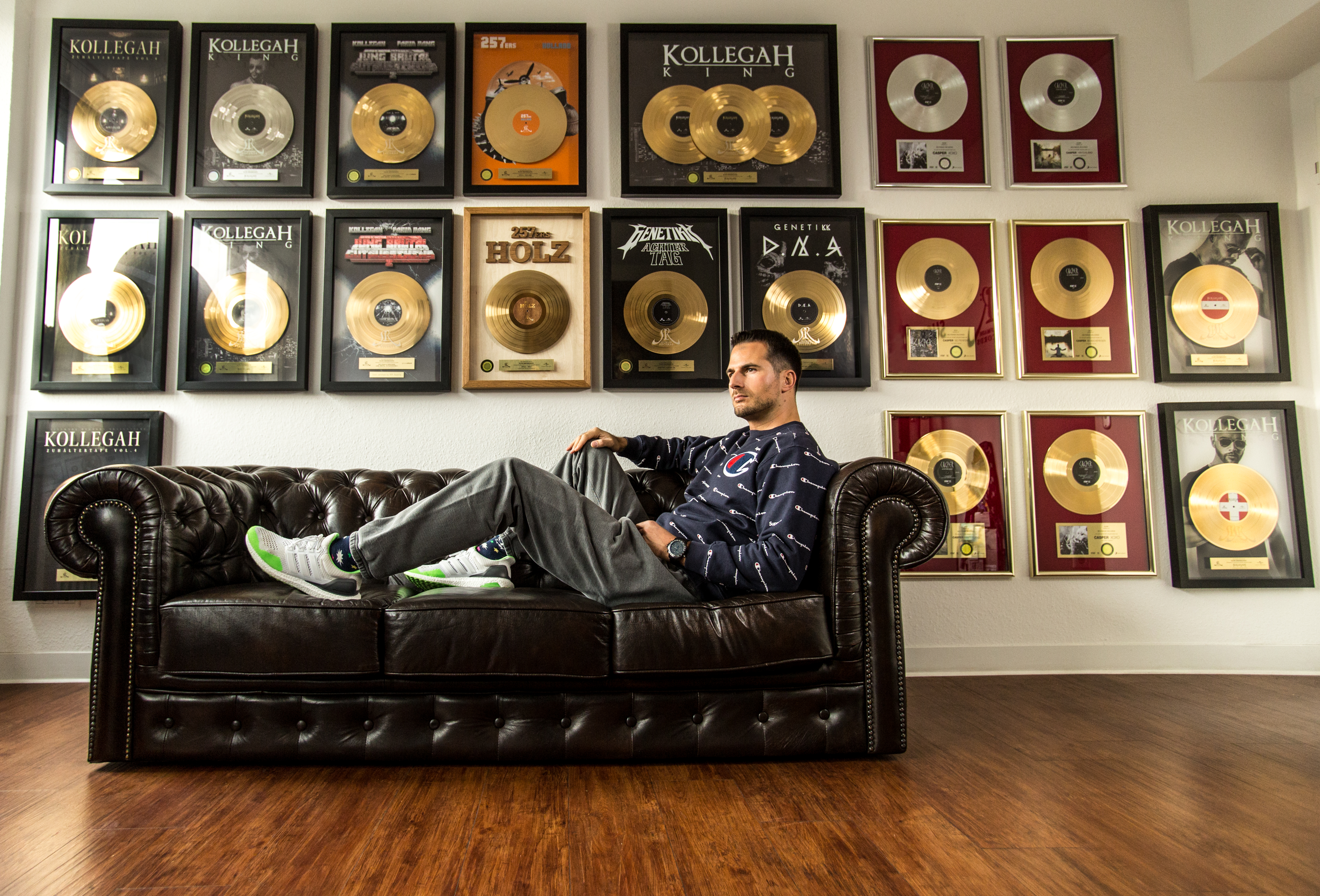
Omerbegovic in the office of Selfmade Records

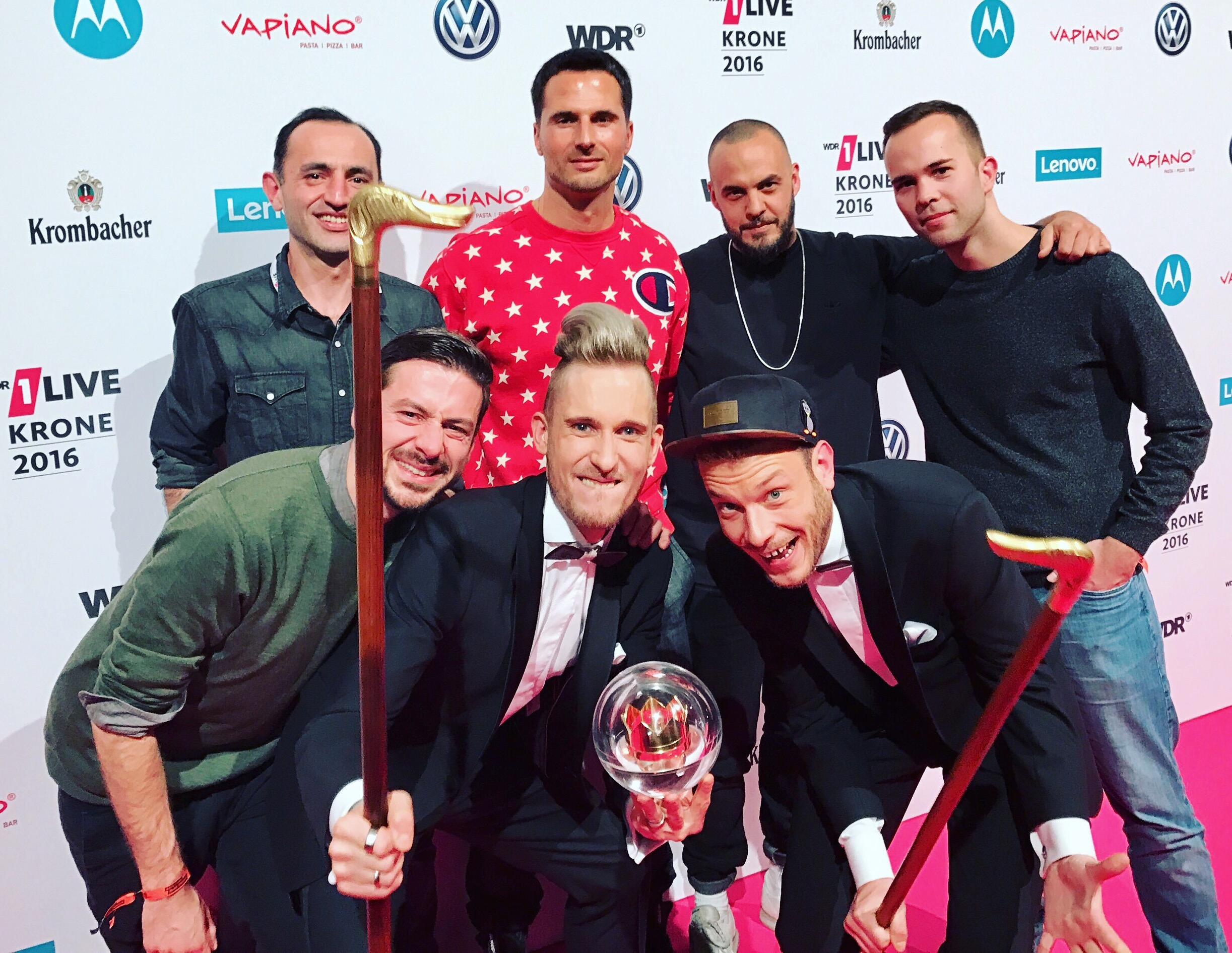
257ers and Omerbegovic at the 1Live Krone 2016

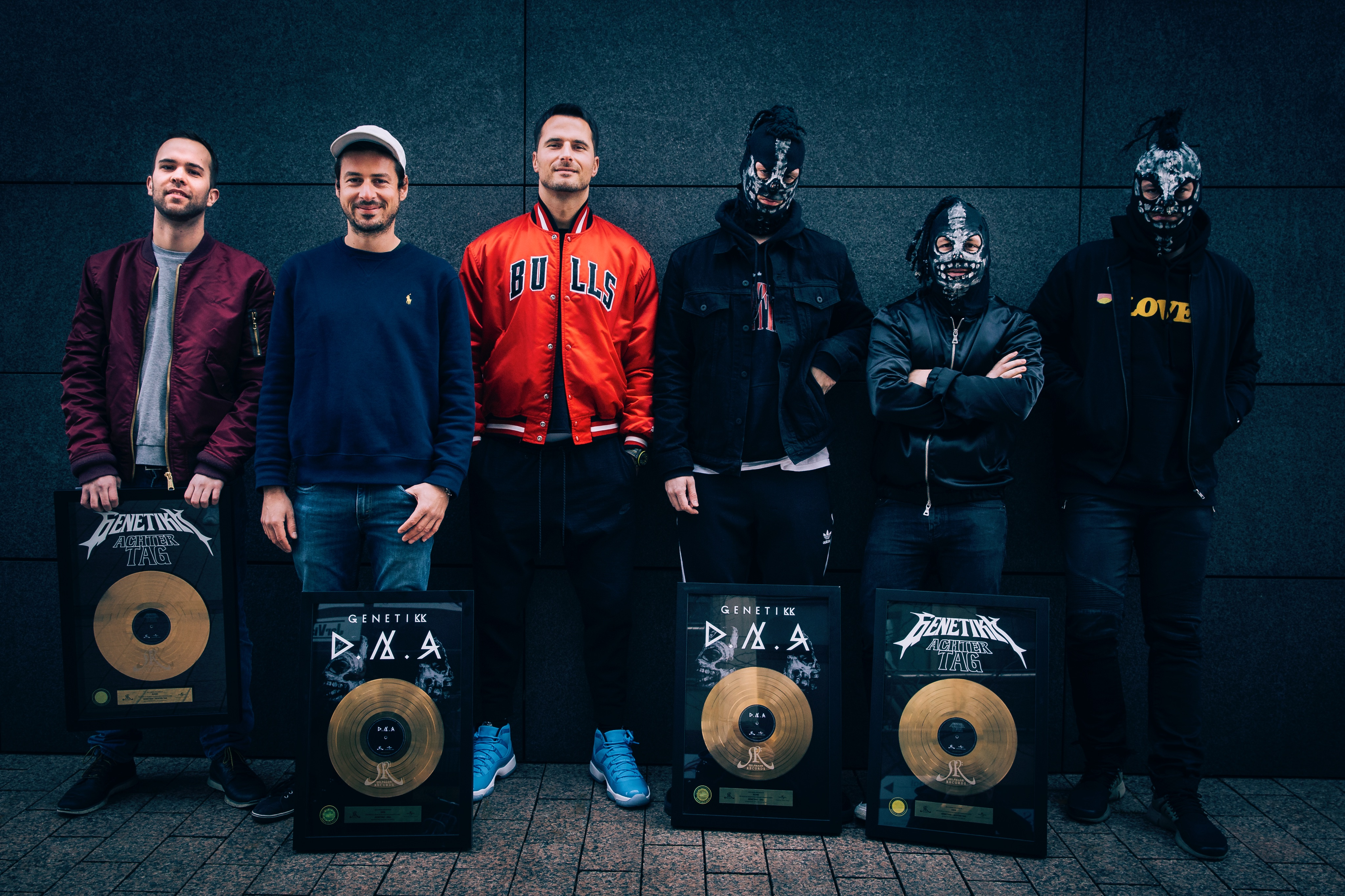
Thomas Burkholz, Markus Huber, Omerbegovic and Genetikk at the gold record certification of "D.N.A." and "Achter Tag"

- 2009: Hiphop.de Awards 2009: Best Label National
- 2011: Hiphop.de Awards 2011: Best Label National
- 2013: Platinum record (Germany) for XOXO
- 2013: Hiphop.de Awards 2013: Best Label National
- 2013: Golden record (Germany) for Jung, brutal, gutaussehend 2
- 2014: Platinum record for King
- 2014: Golden record (Austria) for King
- 2014: Golden record (Switzerland) for King
- 2014: Golden record (Austria) for Hinterland
- 2014: Platinum record (Germany) for Hinterland
- 2015: Hiphop.de Awards 2015: Best Label National
- 2015: Golden record (Germany) for Zuhältertape Volume 4
- 2016: Absatzwirtschaft: No. 19 of the 50 best online marketers
- 2016: Triple Golden record (Germany) for King
- 2016: Golden record (Austria) for Zuhältertape Volume 4
- 2016: Golden record (Switzerland) for Zuhältertape Volume 4
- 2016: Gold single (Germany) for So perfekt
- 2016: Gold single (Germany) for Im Ascheregen
- 2016: Gold single (Germany) for Holland
- 2016: Gold single (Germany) for Holz
- 2017: Platin single (Germany) for Holz

Artist awards with participation as rights holder

- 2014: 1 Live Krone in the Category Best Hip-Hop-Act for Kollegah
- 2015: Echo 2015 in the Category "Artist/Group Hip Hop/Urban (national)" and "Best interactive Act" for Kollegah
- 2016: Echo 2016 in the Category "Artist/Group Hip Hop/Urban (national)" and "Best interactive Act" for Kollegah
- 2016: 1 Live Krone in the Category Best Band for 257ers
