= Bossaura =

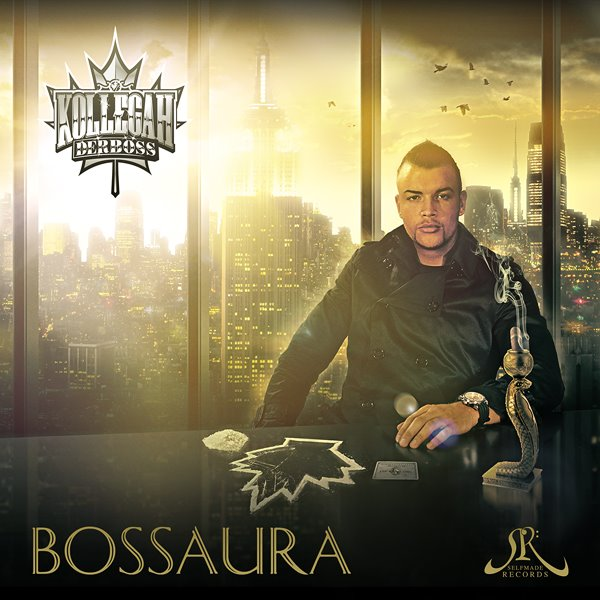

Studio album by Kollegah
- Released: 14 October 2011
- Recorded: 2010–2011 in Osnabrück
- Genre: German hip hop
- Length: 69:01 / 78:43
- Label: Selfmade Records
- Producer: Jay Ho; Jeff K; 2Bough; Abaz; X-Plosive; Böse Beats; Saabiza; Gee Futuristic; Dirty Dasmo; Jamil Samimi

Kollegah chronology
Hoodtape Volume 1 X-Mas Edition (2010)	Bossaura (2011)	Jung, brutal, gutaussehend 2 (2013)

Bossaura is the third studio album by German rapper Kollegah, released on 14 October 2011 by Selfmade Records.

== Background ==
Bossaura was recorded in Osnabrück, Germany. In 2010, Kollegah started writing lyrics and the album production began in March 2011. The production took four months. In total he created 30 songs of which he chose about the half. Additionally, he made seven songs for the album. On 12 August 2011, Selfmade Records announced the album under the name "Flex, Sluts, Rock 'n' Roll". In September the album title was changed to "Bossaura".

== Release and promotion ==
Bossaura was released by Selfmade Records. On 12 August 2011, the limited box set was made available to pre-order on Amazon for €39.99. Internationally, the album was released on 14 October 2011, as a digital download and physically in Germany, Austria, and Switzerland.

== Track listing ==
Adapted from AllMusic.

No.	Title	Length
1.	"Für immer (Intro)"	3:07
2.	"Drugs in den Jeans"	3:23
3.	"Spotlight"	3:43
4.	"Jetlag"	3:15
5.	"Business Paris"	3:30
6.	"Mondfinsternis"	3:15
7.	"Billionaire's Club"	4:09
8.	"Bad Girl"	3:12
9.	"Kobrakopf"	4:20
10.	"Flex, S**ts, Rock'n Roll"	4:12
11.	"I.H.D.P."	4:19
12.	"Bossaura"	6:02
13.	"Kokayne"	3:34
14.	"Du"	5:01
15.	"Undercover"	4:03
16.	"Money"	3:39
17.	"H & F"	3:03
18.	"Das Licht (Outro)"	3:13

== Charts ==
Chart (2011)	Peak position
Austrian Albums (Ö3 Austria)	14
German Albums (Offizielle Top 100)	5
Swiss Albums (Schweizer Hitparade)	19
