= King (Kollegah album) =

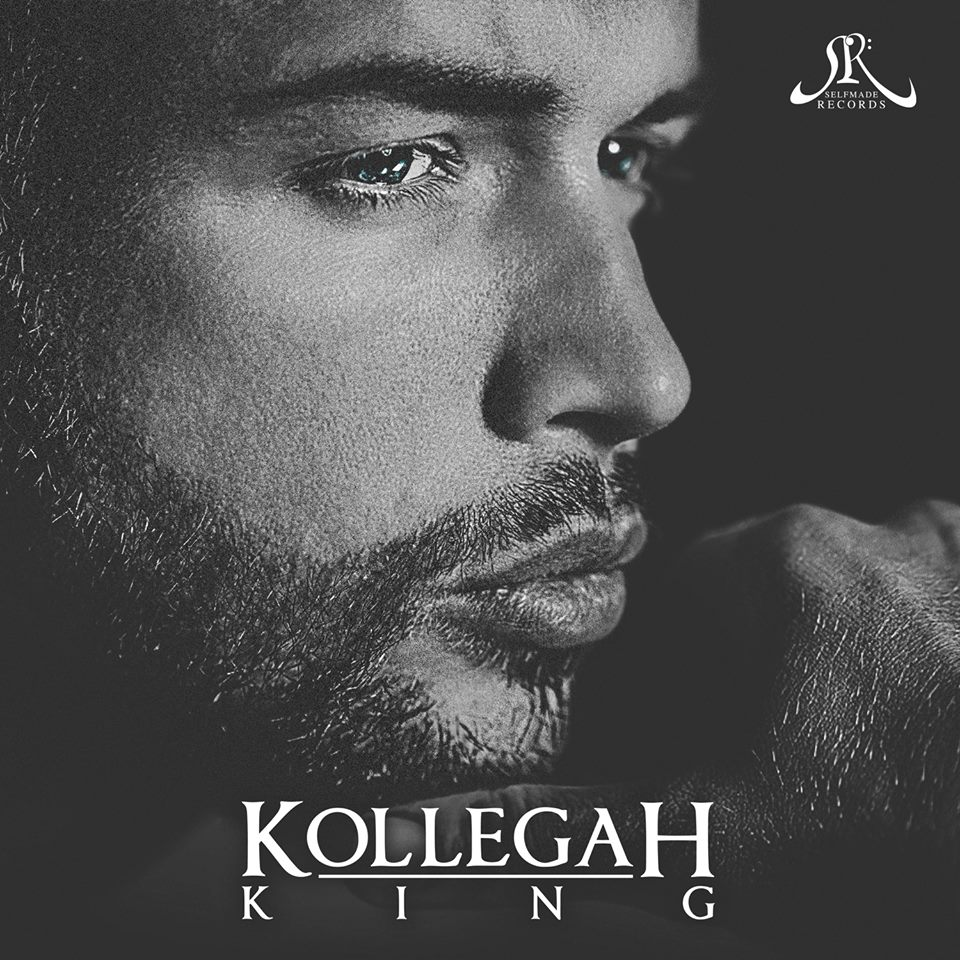

Studio album by Kollegah
- Released: 9 May 2014
- Recorded: 2013–2014
- Length: 74:33
- Label: Selfmade Records

Kollegah chronology
Jung, brutal, gutaussehend 2 (2013)	King (2014)	Zuhältertape Vol. 4 (2015)

Singles from King
- 1. "Alpha" Released: 13 February 2014; 2. "AKs im Wandschrank" Released: 12 March 2014; 3. "King" Released: 19 April 2014; 4. "Du bist Boss" Released: 3 May 2014

King is the fourth studio album by German rapper Kollegah, released on 9 May 2014 through Selfmade Records.

The album produced four singles, including "Alpha", "AKs im Wandschrank", "King" and "Du bist Boss", which all received music videos. King debuted at number one on the German, Swiss and Austrian album charts.

== Background ==
Kollegah started working on King in early 2013, following the release of his second collaborative studio album, Jung, brutal, gutaussehend 2, alongside German rapper Farid Bang in February 2013. The first version of the album was finished in mid-2013, but was tweaked multiple times over the following months. The album's announcement was made on 4 November 2013 through the song "Ruhe vor dem Sturm". The album's release was set to April 2014 but was pushed to early May 2014. It was released on 9 May 2014.

== Commercial performance ==
The album debuted at number one on the German, Swiss and Austrian album charts, becoming Kollegah's second number-one album. The album attained a gold certificate in Germany, three days after its release. It sold about 160,000 copies in its first week. On 11 June 2014, King was certified platinum in Germany for shipments of 200,000 copies. In March 2016, Kollegah was awarded triple-gold by the BVMI. On 26 May 2014, the album was awarded gold by the IFPI Austria for shipments of 7,500 copies, and in March 2018, it was awarded platinum for shipments of 15,000 copies. It is Kollegah's best-selling album to date.

== Track listing ==
All lyrics are written by Kollegah.

No.	Title	Music	Length
1.	"Alpha"	Hookbeats; Phil Fanatic; United Hustlers; Sadikbeatz	2:19
2.	"King"	United Hustlers	3:29
3.	"Flightmode"	Hookbeats; Phil Fanatic	3:25
4.	"R.I.P."	Hookbeats; Phil Fanatic	3:22
5.	"Cohibas, blauer Dunst" (feat. Farid Bang)	Hookbeats; Phil Fanatic	3:23
6.	"AKs im Wandschrank"	Hookbeats; Phil Fanatic; United Hustlers	3:00
7.	"Morgengrauen"	Hookbeats; Phil Fanatic	3:18
8.	"Sanduhr" (feat. Favorite)	KD-Beatz; Drumz N' Roses	3:19
9.	"Du bist Boss"	Hookbeats; Phil Fanatic; Cestro; United Hustlers	2:41
10.	"Universalgenie"	Hookbeats; Phil Fanatic	4:38
11.	"Lamborghini Kickdown"	Hookbeats; Phil Fanatic	2:44
12.	"Karate" (feat. Casper)	Hookbeats; Phil Fanatic; United Hustlers	3:14
13.	"Schwarzer Benz"	Hookbeats; Phil Fanatic	4:28
14.	"Rolex Daytona" (feat. The Game)	Hookbeats; Phil Fanatic; United Hustlers	3:46
15.	"Warum hasst du mich"	Hookbeats; Phil Fanatic; Sadikbeatz; United Hustlers	3:01
16.	"Königsaura"	KD-Beatz	7:26
17.	"Es ist Rap" (feat. Genetikk)	Sikk	2:57
18.	"Click Click"	United Hustlers	3:33
19.	"Regen"	Hookbeats; Phil Fanatic	3:33
20.	"Omega"	Hookbeats; Phil Fanatic	6:57
Total length:			74:33

== Charts ==
=== Weekly charts ===
Chart (2014)	Peak position
Austrian Albums (Ö3 Austria)	1
German Albums (Offizielle Top 100)	1
Swiss Albums (Schweizer Hitparade)	1

=== Year-end charts ===
Chart (2014)	Position
Austrian Albums (Ö3 Austria)	21
German Albums (Offizielle Top 100)	7
Swiss Albums (Offizielle Top 100)	40

== Certifications ==
Region	Certification	Certified units/sales
Austria (IFPI Austria)	Platinum	15,000^{*}
Germany (BVMI)	3× Gold	300,000^{‡}
^{*} Sales figures based on certification alone.^{‡} Sales+streaming figures based on certification alone.
