= Zuhältertape Volume 3 =

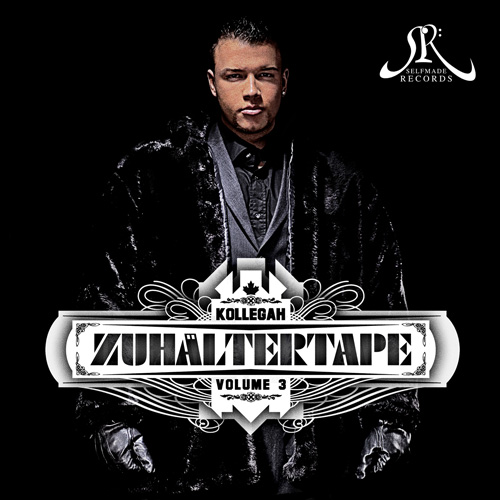

Mixtape by Kollegah
- Released: 19 December 2009 (Germany)
- Genre: German hip hop, rap
- Label: Selfmade Records

Kollegah chronology
| Jung, brutal, gutaussehend (2009) | Zuhältertape Volume 3 (2009) | Hoodtape Volume 1 (2010) |

Zuhältertape Volume 3 is the third mixtape by German rapper Kollegah, released on 19 December 2009 by Selfmade Records. This mixtape is the sequel to Boss der Bosse (2006). Hip hop producers including Hookbeatz, B-Case, Six June and Rizbo were involved in the production.

== Release ==
The release date for the mixtape was actually planned for 12 December 2009, but it got displaced because rapper Mr. Chissman and BoZ, who were originally confirmed as guest artists, had not completed the recording of their parts in time.

The high traffic on Kollegah's website following the release temporarily crashed it.

== Track list ==
1. "Intro"
2. "Endlösung"
3. "Millennium"
4. "Westside"
5. "Rotlichtmassaker" (feat. Sundiego)
6. "Hoodtales I"
7. "Lovesong Reloaded"
8. "Zuhälterrap"
9. "Amsterdam"
10. "Hoodtales II"
11. "Selfmade Kings" (feat. Favorite)
12. "180 Grad
13. "Angeberprollrap 2"
14. "Hiroshima"
15. "Fahrenheit"
  - Contains a sample of "Sky High" by Jigsaw
16. "Hoodtales III"
17. "Internationaler Player"
18. "Outro"
  - Contains a sample from Nightwish's "Cover Me"

== Sources ==
- https://web.archive.org/web/20100110122316/http://www.kingshit.net/2009/11/27/kollegah-zuhaeltertape-3-covertracklist.html
