= Kollegah (album) =

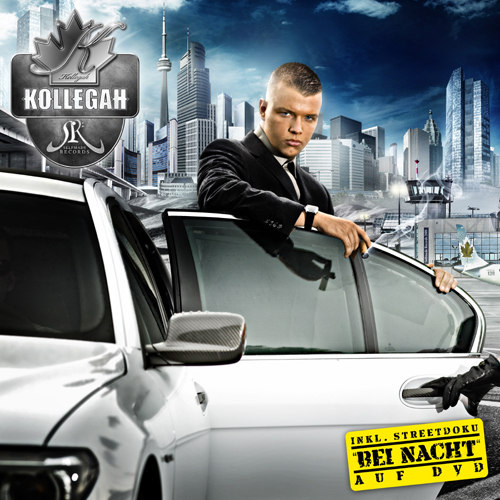

Studio album by Kollegah
- Released: 29 August 2008
- Recorded: 2007–2008
- Studio: Selfmade Studio
- Length: 58:54
- Label: Selfmade Records

Kollegah chronology
Alphagene (2007)	Kollegah (2008)	Jung, brutal, gutaussehend (2009)

Professional ratings
Review scores
Source	Rating
Juice	4/6 stars

Kollegah is the second studio album by German rapper Kollegah, released on 29 August 2008 by Selfmade Records.

== Background ==
Immediately after the release of his first studio album Alphagene (2007), Kollegah started working on his second studio album. From December 2007 till July 2008, he recorded 40 tracks, of which he chose the 17 best. The album was recorded with no real concept.

== Release and promotion ==
Kollegah was released by Selfmade Records. In July 2008, Kollegah published a song named Bodyguard, through German magazine Juice. The first single, "Big Boss", was released on 31 July 2008. The music video reached the top of MTV's Total Request Live.

== Charts ==
Chart (2008)	Peak position
Austrian Albums (Ö3 Austria)	48
German Albums (Offizielle Top 100)	17
