= Kollegah =

German rapper

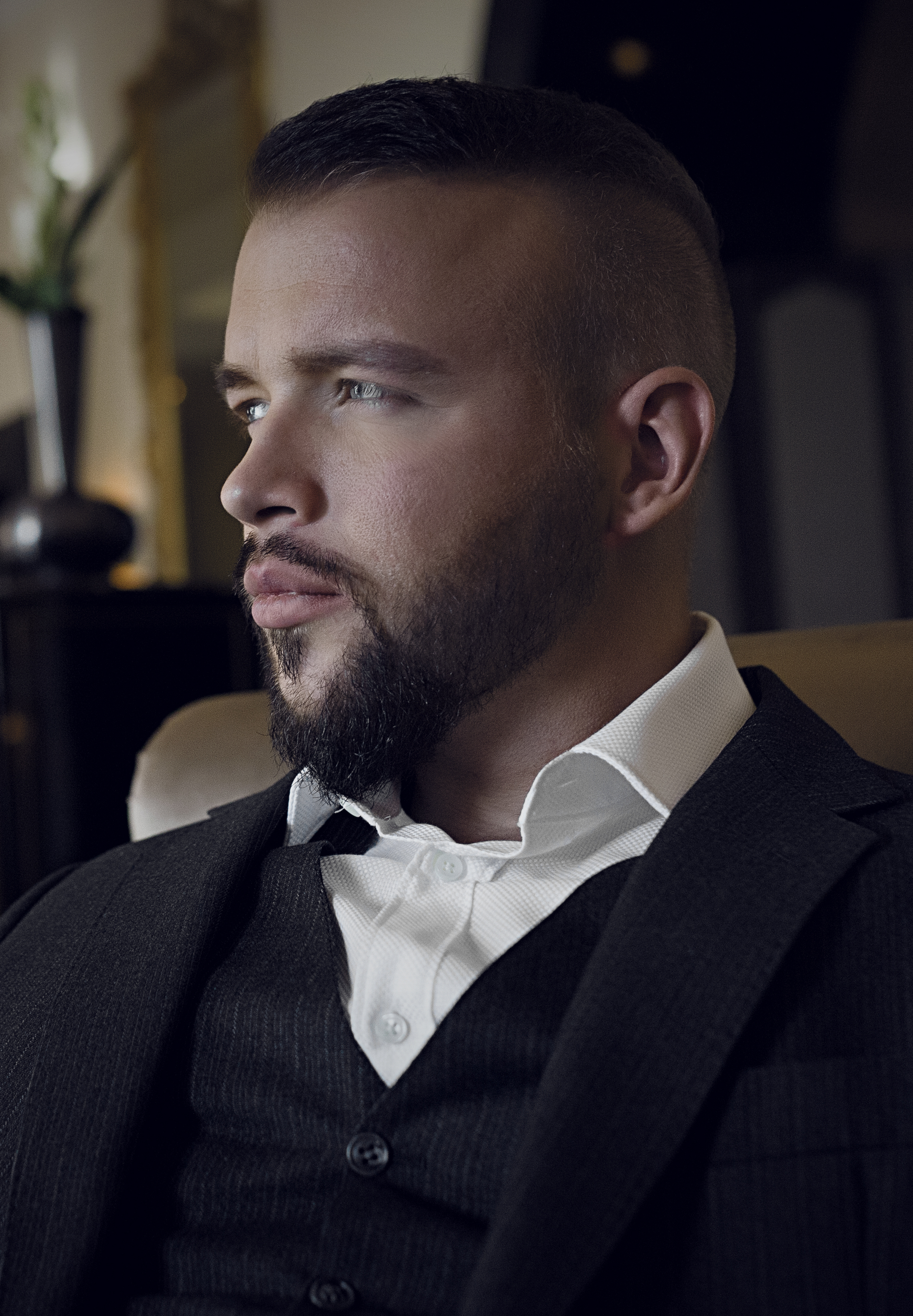
- Kollegah in 2015

Background information
- Born: Felix Martin Andreas Matthias Blume; 3 August 1984 (age 42); Friedberg, West Germany
- Genres: Hip hop; gangsta rap; chopper rap
- Occupations: Rapper; songwriter; entrepreneur
- Years active: 2003–present
- Labels: Alpha Music Empire; Selfmade Records
- Website: Kollegah on Facebook

Felix Martin Andreas Matthias Blume (Note: Other sources cite his name as Felix Antoine Blume.) (born 3 August 1984), known professionally as Kollegah, is a German rapper. He releases his music via his own label, Alpha Music Empire.

Born in Friedberg and raised by a single mother in Simmern, he started rapping in the Reimliga Battle Arena in December 2004. Intending to pursue a solo career as a rapper, Kollegah released his first mixtape Zuhältertape in July 2005 and was signed to Selfmade Records in December of the same year. He went on to pursue a variety of styles on subsequent albums Alphagene (2007), Kollegah (2008) and Bossaura (2011). His fourth studio album, King, was released in 2014 and became his best-selling album to date. In 2024 Kollegah released his last album, titled "Still King".

Kollegah also released four collaborative studio albums with German rapper Farid Bang, the Jung brutal gutaussehend tetralogy, between 2009 and 2018. (Note: Jung, brutal, gutaussehend (2009), Jung, brutal, gutaussehend 2 (2013) and Jung, brutal, gutaussehend 3 (2017), and Platin war gestern (2018))

== Biography ==
=== 1984–2007: Early life, Reimliga Battle Arena, Zuhältertape and Alphagene ===
Felix Blume was born on 3 August 1984 in Friedberg, Hesse, to a Canadian father and a German mother. His parents divorced during his childhood. After the divorce, he moved with his mother to Simmern in Rhineland-Palatinate. He attended the Herzog-Johann-Gymnasium, where he passed his Abitur exam in 2005. Through his Algerian stepfather he converted to Islam. From December 2004 until May 2005 Kollegah participated in rap battles hosted on online platform Reimliga Battle Arena (RBA) and won 11 out of 14 evaluated battles.

Blume released his first Mixtape, the Zuhältertape (ZHT) for free on 20 July 2005 on his website. The 14-track long project was downloaded – according to Blume – over 5,000 times in one month. The project was re-released in December 2005 through Selfmade Records. In July 2006, Blume published his second Mixtape Boss der Bosse (ZHT 2). He was criticised for his live performance during the Splash! in 2006. Blume's first studio album Alphagene was set to release in September 2007, but was postponed to November, after he was found with cocaine and amphetamine in Bad Kreuznach. Alphagene became Kollegahs first project to enter the German charts on 30 November 2007. The album debuted on number 51 and left the charts next week. According to Selfmade Records, the album was sold over 20,000 times.

=== 2008–2010: Kollegah, Chronik 2, ZHT 3, Jung, brutal, gutaussehend and feud with Aggro Berlin ===
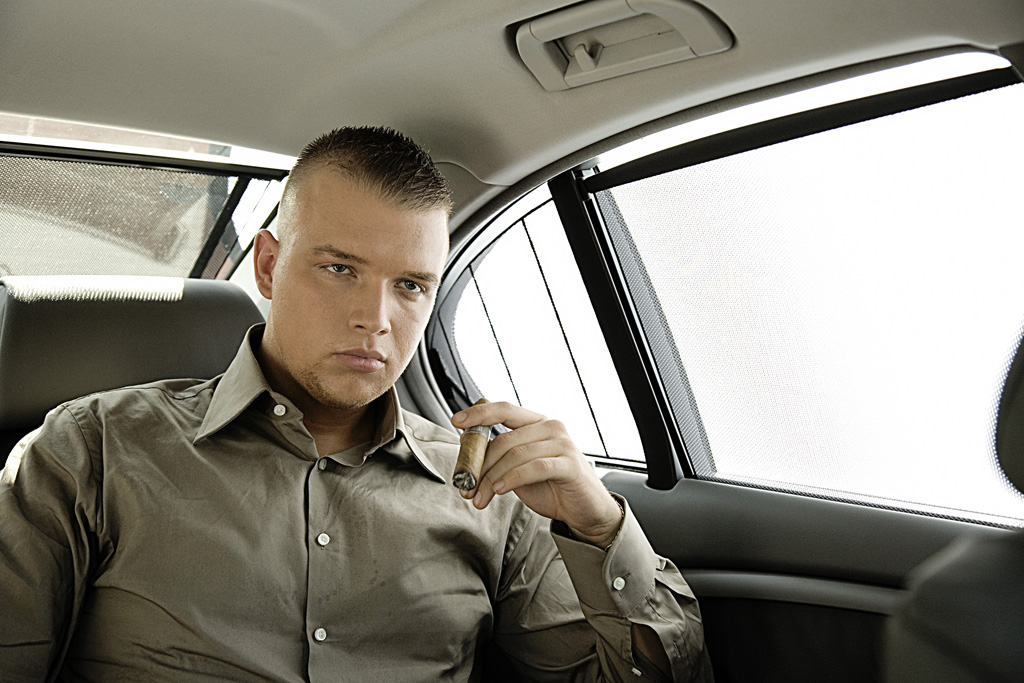
Kollegah in 2008

On 28 August 2008, Blume released his second studio album Kollegah, which peaked at 17 in Germany, 48 in Switzerland and sold over 20,000 copies.

On 17 April 2009, Chronik 2 was released, an album featuring the Selfmade Records artists Kollegah, Favorite, Casper and Shiml. The previously released song "Westdeutschlands Kings" performed by Kollegah, Favorite and Farid Bang, targeted insults at Sido, Fler and Kitty Kat from Aggro Berlin. In March, a song titled "Früher wart ihr Fans" was released by Fler, Kitty Kat and Godsilla as a reaction. In the song, they accuse Selfmade Records artists of having created the feud for the sole purpose of marketing their album; Kitty Kat also attacks Favorite by referring to the death of his parents, who died because of a fire while camping. Kollegah responded on 20 March with the song "Fanpost", calling Fler a "fat potato" and claims that he was penetrated with a carrot. Fler responded with the song "Schrei nach Liebe", the chorus of which is heavily based on Die Ärzte's 1993 hit single "Schrei nach Liebe".

Three months after the release of Chronik 2, Blume released his first collaborative album with Farid Bang, called Jung, brutal, gutaussehend. In December, Blume released the third part of his Zuhältertape-Series. A year later, Selfmade released the a limited box set with all three Zuhältertape's and the Hoodtape Volume 1, which was re-released on 18 December 2010 as Hoodtape Volume 1 X-Mas Edition with some additional and extended tracks.

=== 2011–2015: Bossaura, Jung, brutal, gutaussehend 2, King and Zuhältertape 4 ===
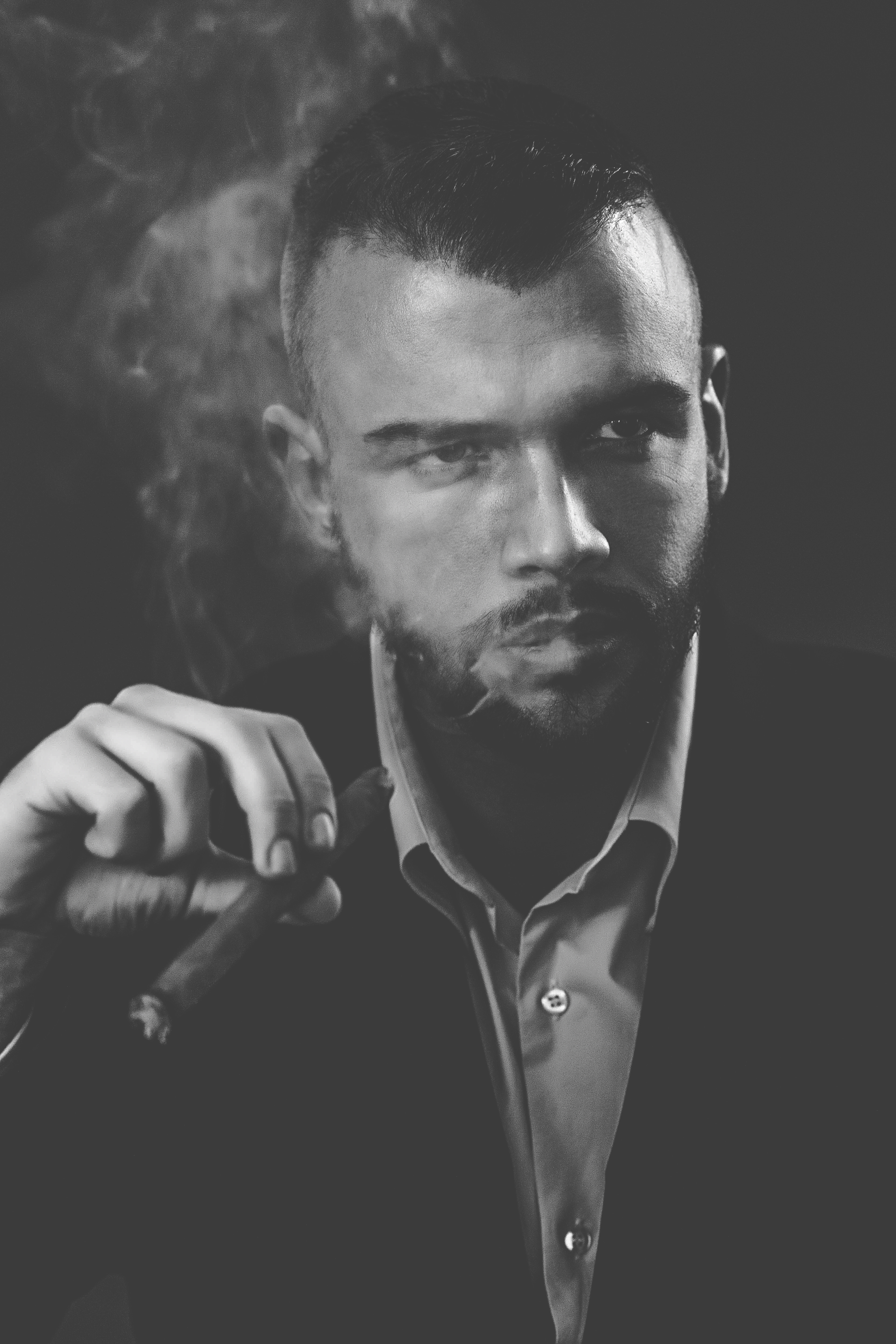
Kollegah in 2014

In 2011, Kollegah released his album Bossaura, which peaked at number 5 in German album charts. Jung, brutal, gutaussehend 2, his collaboration album with Farid Bang, was released in 2013 and reached number 1 in Germany, Austria and Switzerland. It sold more than 80,000 copies in the first week. Kollegahs album King in 2014 sold more than 160,000 copies in the first week and was his second number-one album. Zuhältertape 4 (ZHT 4) was released in December 2015 and also reached number 1 in Germany, Austria and Switzerland.

=== 2016–2017: Imperator and Legacy ===
In March 2016, Blume founded his own label Alpha Music Empire. The first signing was the rapper Seyed. His debut studio album Engel mit der AK peaked on number three of the German album charts. On 2 September 2016 he announced his sixth studio album and first under his own label Imperator, which was released on 9 December 2016. Imperator peaked at number one of the German, Austrian and Swiss album charts. It also became his third solo album to receive a gold certificate. On 10 March 2017, Kollegah announced his first best-of album Legacy and the "Kollegah Gold-Award", a compilation of all his albums released under Selfmade Records between 2005 and 2015. Legacy was supported by two singles, "Legacy" and "Millennium". Legacy was released on 14 July 2017 and peaked in the top 15 of German-speaking Europe.

=== 2017–2021: JBG 3, Platin war gestern, Monument, Alphagene II and NBK ===
Kollegah and Farid Bang regularly teased Jung Brutal Gutaussehend 3 (JBG 3) between March 2016 and 2017. The album was officially announced on 8 September 2017. "Sturmmaske auf (Intro)", the first single of the album was announced on 21 September 2017 and released a week later. The single became an immediate success for them, becoming their first and only single to reach the pole position of the German singlecharts. Two more singles have been released; "Gamechanger" and "Ave Maria", both of them entered the charts on high positions. Following the release of the album in December 2017, it broke multiple records in Germany, including the fastest rap album to be certified gold in Germany (they sold 100,000 copies in eight days though pre-orders). and the most streamed project in a week on Spotify by a German artist.

During their live performance of "All Eyez on us", they announced a reissue of Jung Brutal Gutaussehend 3 with the title Jung Brutal Gutaussehend 3: Platin war gestern. The record was planned to include two EPs – Älter Brutaler Skrupelloser EP and Nafri Trap EP, Vol. 1. The album was scheduled for release in June but was postponed to 10 August 2018, following the duos desire to expand the Älter Brutaler Skrupelloser EP to a full album. Nafri Trap EP, Vol. 1 was released on 29 June 2018 as an apology to their fans. Platin war gestern was supported by three singles – "All Eyez on Us", "Mitternacht 2" and "In die Unendlichkeit". The project became their third collaborative studio album to debut on the pole positions of the German, Austrian and Swiss albumcharts.

Blume released his seventh studio album, Monument, in December 2018. The album Alphagene II followed in December 2019. Alphagene II was his eighth number 1 album. In January 2021, he released the album Natural Born Killers (NBK), a collaboration album with Asche, who released his music at Kollegah's label between 2018 and March 2021.

=== Since 2020: Natural Born Killas, Zuhältertape Vol. 5, Free Spirit, and La Deutsche Vita ===
On January 22, 2021, he released the collaborative album Natural Born Killas with his label partner Asche.

On April 9, 2021, Kollegah began a five-month promotional phase for his new album Zuhältertape Vol. 5 with the release of a first trailer. It was revealed that the album would likely be released at the end of September 2021. Additionally, the track Frühling was teased, which marks the conclusion of his long-running series consisting of Sommer, Herbst, and Winter. The album was released on October 8, 2021.

With the release of the music video Free Spirit on April 15, 2022, Kollegah announced the album of the same name, which was released on August 5, 2022.

On July 7, 2023, his eleventh studio album La Deutsche Vita was released.

== Controversies ==
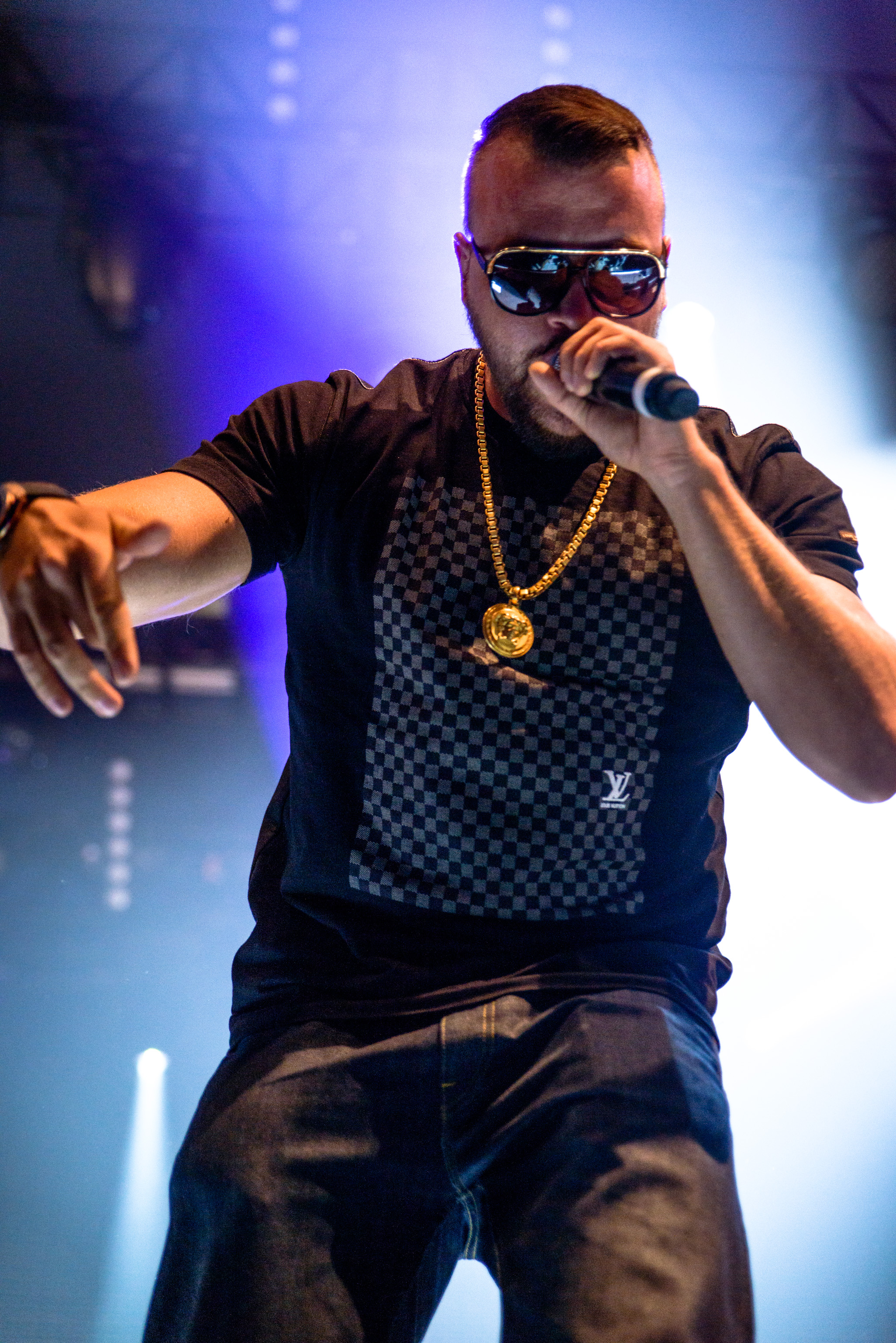
Kollegah performing in 2015

=== Antisemitism and conspiracy theories ===
On his third mixtape Zuhältertape Volume 3, Blume used the line "Endlösung der Rapperfrage", directly referring to the Final Solution during the Holocaust. Gerhard Strate called it mocking of Holocaust victims. His fourth studio album Zuhältertape Vol. 4 contained statements like "Nutte, Zeit, dass du Putzlappen befeuchtest / Ich bring Schusswaffengeräusche wie die Schutzstaffel der Deutschen" ("Hooker, that time that you moisturize cloths / I bring firearms sounds like the Schutzstaffel of the Germans") or "Kid, es ist der Boss, der für 'ne Modezeitschrift Posen einnimmt wie die Wehrmacht, die in Polen einschritt" ("Kid, it is the boss, who poses for a fashion magazine like the Wehrmacht, which invaded Poland").

In 2016, Blume released the song "Apokalypse", in which he depicts human history as being the good against the bad. The final battle is set in East Jerusalem. The devil is sitting in a skyscraper and the climax of the video is a book burning. After the world is freed from the evil, Blume says that "Buddhist, Muslims and Christians will rebuild the world peacefully" and forgot to mention Jews.

Kollegah denies any accusations of antisemitism. In 2021, he published an album with Asche, a German rapper with Jewish roots. Furthermore, Kollegah and German-Jewish rapper Sun Diego fueled rumours that they plan a collaborative albums together.

Kollegah criticized the American foreign policy several times. He also doubts the official version of 9/11, the Moon landing and evolution theory and also spread rumours about Pizzagate and chemtrails.

In November 2016, Blume released the documentation Kollegah an Palästina (Eine StreetCinema Dokumentation) on his YouTube channel Alpha Music Empire. He travelled through the Palestinian territories, visited the West Bank barrier, the refugee camp Am'ari and supported a school. The documentation started a controversy in the German rap scene.

In 2018, months after release, Kollegah and Farid Bang were criticized for the lines commit another Holocaust and come with Molotov and My body is more defined than those of Auschwitz inmates on their album Jung Brutal Gutaussehend 3. They received the coveted German ECHO award for this album and also performed live, and in reaction to this, several artists gave their ECHOs back. Both had originally defended their lines as a form of stylistic means, exaggeration, provocation, artistic boundaries, but later apologized.

== Other ventures ==
In February 2014, Blume launched his own fitness program named Bosstransformation. Two years later he launched the Bosstransformation 2, an updated version. In November 2015, Blume launched his own clothing line Deus Maximus. A year before, his first brand Copayn had flopped. With his new brand Deus Maximus he has a cooperation with Def Shop, one of the biggest German online shops.

== Personal life ==
Blume studied law at the Johannes Gutenberg University in Mainz for some years.

At the age of 15, Blume came in contact with Islam through his Algerian stepfather. He converted to the religion in the same year.

During a concert of his "Imperator" tour in Leipzig, there was a violent incident onstage. As is often the case with rap concerts, a rap battle between two spectators should be performed on the stage. One of the participants tried to grab Blume's sunglasses. As a result, Blume shoved the man, kicked him and punched him in the face. A few hours later, videos of the attack were uploaded to YouTube and Facebook. An uninvolved person reported Blume to the police.

== Discography ==
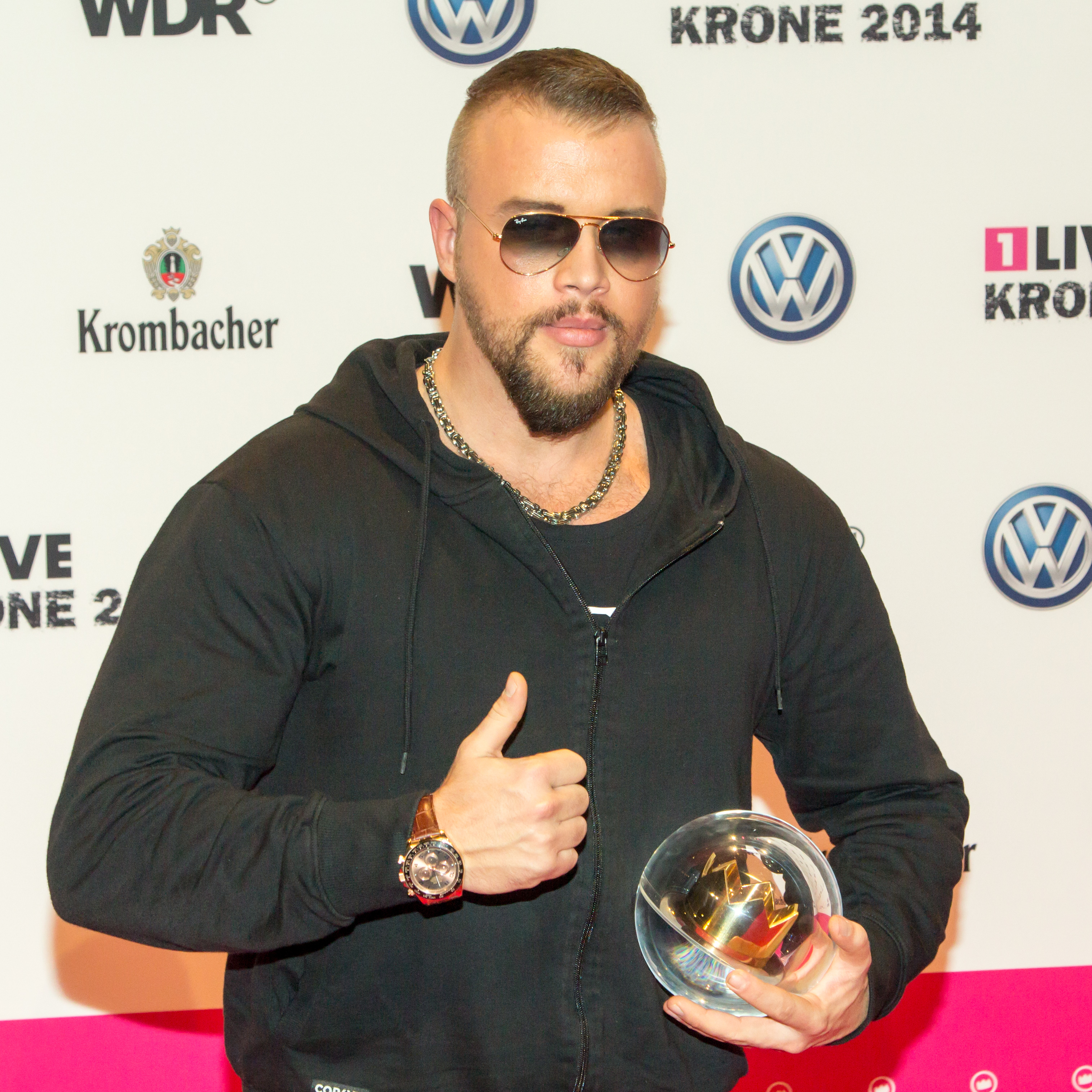
Kollegah at the award show 1LIVE Krone in 2014

- Alphagene (2007)
- Kollegah (2008)
- Bossaura (2011)
- King (2014)
- Zuhältertape Vol. 4 (2015)
- Imperator (2016)
- Monument (2018)
- Alphagene II (2019)
- Golden Era Tourtape (2020)
- Natural Born Killas (2021)
- Zuhältertape Vol. 5 (2021)
- Free Spirit (2022)
- La Deutsche Vita (2023)
- Cross Border Armageddon (2023)
- Still King (2024)

== Tours ==
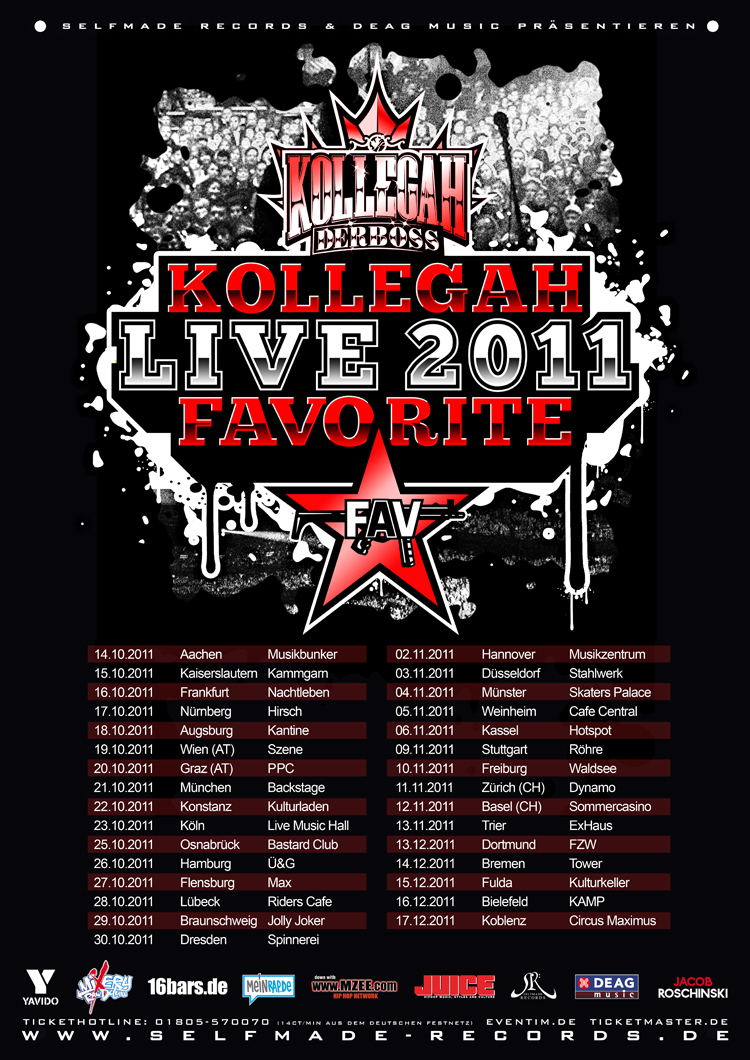
Tour poster for the Live 2011 Tour with Favorite

- Alphagene Tour (2008)
- Mittelfinger Hoch Tour (2009)
- Teens for Cash Tour (2010)
- Je mehr Testo besser Tour (2010)
- Live 2011 Tour (2011)
- JBG 2 Tour (2013)
- King Tour (2014)
- Red Light Tour (2016)
- Imperator Tour (2017)
- JBG 3 Tour (2018)
- Monument Tour (2019)

== Achievements ==
Five of Kollegahs projects have gone at least gold in Germany and six of them reached the pole position of the German album charts.
