= Nafri Trap EP, Vol. 1 =

EP by Kollegah and Farid Bang
- Released: 29 June 2018
- Recorded: 2017–2018
- Length: 14:10
- Label: Alpha Music Empire; Banger Musik; Groove Attack
- Producer: Juh-Dee

Kollegah chronology
Freetracks Compilation (2018)	Nafri Trap EP, Vol. 1 (2018)	Platin war gestern (2018)

Farid Bang chronology
§185 (2017)	Nafri Trap EP, Vol. 1 (2018)	Platin war gestern (2018)

Singles from Nafri Trap EP, Vol. 1
- 1. "Zieh' den Rucksack aus" Released: 30 September 2017; 2. "One Night Stand" Released: 29 December 2017

The Nafri Trap EP, Vol. 1 is the second collaborative extended play by German rappers Kollegah and Farid Bang, released on 29 June 2018, through Alpha Music Empire, Banger Musik, and Groove Attack.

== Background ==
Kollegah and Farid Bang released their third collaborative studio album, Jung, brutal, gutaussehend 3 in December 2017 to big commercial success. The album was certified gold in Germany eight days prior to its release. As the Echo Music Prize is determined by the previous year's sales, Jung Brutal Gutaussehend 3 was nominated in the categories best hip hop/urban album and album of the year. German tabloid paper Bild accused Farid Bang and Kollegah antisemitism on their song "0815" on the §185 ep. They referred to their muscles being more defined than those of Auschwitz inmates. During their live performance of "All Eyez on us", they announced a reissue of Jung, brutal, gutaussehend 3 with the title Jung, brutal, gutaussehend 3: Platin war gestern. The record was planned to include two eps—Älter Brutaler Skrupelloser EP and the Nafri Trap EP, Vol. 1. The album was scheduled for 29 June, but was postponed to 10 August 2018. The duo wanted to expand the Älter Brutaler Skrupelloser EP to a full album, which was released under the title Platin war gestern on 10 August 2018. The Nafri Trap EP, Vol. 1 was released for streaming as an apology to their fans.

== Track listing ==
Nafri Trap EP, Vol. 1
No.	Title	Lyrics	Music	Length
1.	"Ronaldo und Messi"	Felix Blume; Farid El Abdellaoui	Juh Dee	2:55
2.	"Zieh' den Rucksack aus"	Blume; El Abdellaoui	Juh-Dee	2:35
3.	"One Night Stand"	Blume; El Abdellaoui	Juh-Dee	2:43
4.	"Trainier die Beine nicht"	Blume; El Abdellaoui	Juh Dee	2:41
5.	"Venice Beach"	Blume; El Abdellaoui	Juh-Dee	3:16
Total length:				14:10

== Charts ==
Chart (2018)	Peak position
Swiss Albums (Schweizer Hitparade)	48
