= Jung, brutal, gutaussehend 2 =

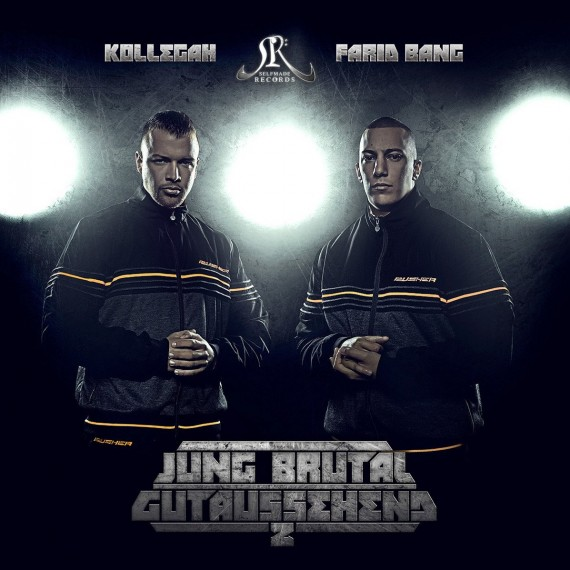

Studio album by Kollegah and Farid Bang
- Released: 8 February 2013
- Recorded: 2012–2013
- Genre: German hip hop
- Length: 49:30 / 66:06 / 69:42
- Label: Selfmade Records
- Producers: Shuko; Johnny Illstrument; M3; Brisk Fingaz; Abaz; Hookbeats; Cristal; Joshimixu; KD Beatz; Cubeatz; United Hustlers; Freed; Chrizmatic; Juh-Dee

Kollegah chronology
Bossaura (2011)	Jung, brutal, gutaussehend 2 (2013)	King (2014)

Farid Bang chronology
Der letzte Tag deines Lebens (2012)	Jung, brutal, gutaussehend 2 (2013)	Killa (2014)

Singles from Jung, brutal, gutaussehend 2
- 1. "Dynamit" Released: 30 November 2012; 2. "Drive-By" Released: 21 December 2012; 3. "Du kennst den Westen" Released: 11 January 2013; 4. "Stiernackenkommando" Released: 21 January 2013

Jung, brutal, gutaussehend 2 ("Young, violent, handsome 2") is the second collaborative studio album by German rappers Kollegah and Farid Bang, released on 8 February 2013 via Selfmade Records.

== Background ==
In June 2009, Kollegah and Farid Bang released Jung, brutal, gutaussehend, their first collaborative studio album. It peaked on number 30 of the German album charts. Despite the negative reviews by critics, the album became a favourite between their fans. As a result, the rappers were asked about a second part repeatedly. Kollegah confirmed in an Interview in 2011, that they are planning to record a second album together. In October 2012, they confirmed Jung, brutal, gutaussehend 2.

== Track listing ==
All lyrics are written by Kollegah and Farid Bang.

Standard edition
No.	Title	Producer(s)	Length
1.	"Dynamit" (Dynamite)	Johnny Illstrument & United Hustlers	2:39
2.	"Friss oder stirb" (Eat or die)	Shuko & Freedo	3:07
3.	"Bossmodus" (Boss mode)	Hookbeats, Cristal & United Hustlers	3:05
4.	"Adrenalin" (Adrenaline)	Shuko	3:53
5.	"Du kennst den Westen" (You know the West)	Brisk Fingaz & Chrizmatic	2:42
6.	"Stiernackenkommando" (Bull neck squad)	M3	3:59
7.	"4 Elemente" (Four elements)	Johnny Illstrument	2:58
8.	"Steroidrap"	Hookbeats, Cristal & United Hustlers	4:10
9.	"Dissen aus Prinzip" (Diss on principle)	Brisk Fingaz	3:34
10.	"Welche deutsche Crew ist besser?" (Which German crew is better?)	Abaz	3:38
11.	"Drive-By"	Shuko & Freedo	3:36
12.	"Kriminell & breit gebaut" (Criminal & square-built)	Johnny Illstrument	2:41
13.	"Halleluja"	Joshimixu	3:34
14.	"Town, die nie schläft" (Town that never sleeps)	KD-Beatz & Cubeatz	2:41
15.	"Jung, brutal, gutaussehend 2013" (Young, violent, handsome 2013)	Brisk Fingaz	3:13

Premium edition
No.	Title	Producer(s)	Length
16.	"Gangbanger 2"	Shuko	2:38
17.	"Titan"	Johnny Illstrument	2:54
18.	"Survival of the Fittest"	M3	3:23
19.	"Ey yo Pt. 2"	Shuko	3:35
20.	"Du liegst" (You lie (on the ground))	Brisk Fingaz	4:01

iTunes deluxe edition
No.	Title	Producer(s)	Length
21.	"Machoattitüde" (Macho attitude)	Juh-Dee	3:36

== Charts ==
=== Weekly charts ===
Chart (2013)	Peak position
Austrian Albums (Ö3 Austria)	1
German Albums (Offizielle Top 100)	1
Swiss Albums (Schweizer Hitparade)	1

=== Year-end charts ===
Chart (2013)	Position
Austrian Albums (Ö3 Austria)	60
German Albums (Offizielle Top 100)	23
Swiss Albums (Schweizer Hitparade)	82
