= Selfmade Records =

German hip hop label

- Founded: 2005
- Founder: Elvir Omerbegovic; Philipp Dammann
- Genre: Hip hop
- Country of origin: Germany
- Location: Düsseldorf
- Official website: selfmade-records.de

Selfmade Records is a German hip hop label, which was formed 2005 by Elvir Omerbegovic, better known under the pseudonym Slick One, and Philipp Dammann. The studio is located in Düsseldorf. Philipp Dammann left the label at the end of 2005.

== History ==
The label was formed 2005 in Düsseldorf. The first artist who signed was Favorite, who released 4 April 2005 the sampler Schwarzes Gold as first release over Selfmade Records. It follows the album Rappen kann tödlich sein by Favorite and Jason, which was mainly produced by Rizbo, who signed as well 2004.

== Artists ==
=== Current acts ===
Act	Year signed	Albums under Selfmade Records	Description
257ers	2012	2	Rap group composed of Keule, Jewlz, Mike and Shneezin
Karate Andi	2014	2	Rapper from Neukölln

=== Former acts ===
Act	Years on the label	Albums under Selfmade Records	Description
Kollegah	2005–2016	5	Rapper from Friedberg
Genetikk	2011–2017	4	Rapper from Saarbrücken
Shiml	2005–2009	2	Rapper from Bremen
Casper	2009–2010		Rapper from Extertal, near Bielefeld
Favorite	2005–2018	5	Rapper from Essen

=== Current producers ===
- Rizbo
- Johnny Illstrument

=== Former producers ===
- Thomas Burkholz

== Releases ==
=== Albums ===
Year	Title	Artist(s)	Chart position (GER)	Format
2005	Schwarzes Gold	Selfmade Records		Sampler
2005	Rappen kann tödlich sein	Favorite & Jason		Album
2005	Zuhältertape X-MAS Edition	Kollegah		Mixtape
2006	Hinterm Horizont	Shiml		Album
2006	Boss der Bosse	Kollegah		'Street album'
2007	Harlekin	Favorite		Album
2007	Chronik 1	Selfmade Records		Sampler
2007	Alphagene	Kollegah	51	Album
2008	Anarcho	Favorite	24	Album
2008	Kollegah	Kollegah	17 AT: 48	Album & DVD
2008	Schläge für Hip Hop	Favorite & Hollywood Hank		Mixtape
2009	Im Alleingang	Shiml	86	Album
2009	Chronik 2	Selfmade Records	15 AT: 72	Sampler & DVD
2009	Jung, brutal, gutaussehend	Kollegah & Farid Bang	30	Album
2009	Zuhältertape Volume 3	Kollegah		Mixtape
2010	Hoodtape Volume 1	Kollegah		Tape
2010	Generation Null	MontanaMax & Shiml		Album
2010	Hoodtape Volume 1 X-Mas Edition	Kollegah		Tape & DVD
2011	Christopher Alex	Favorite	4	Album
2011	Bossaura	Kollegah	5	Album
2012	HRNSHN	257ers	6	Album
2013	Jung, brutal, gutaussehend 2	Kollegah & Farid Bang	1	Album
2013	D.N.A.	Genetikk	1	Album
2014	King	Kollegah	1	Album
2014	Boomshakkalakka	257ers	1	Album & DVD
2015	Neues von Gott	Favorite	1	Album
2015	Chronik 3	Selfmade Records	1 AT: 2	Sampler
