= List of songs recorded by Capital Bra =

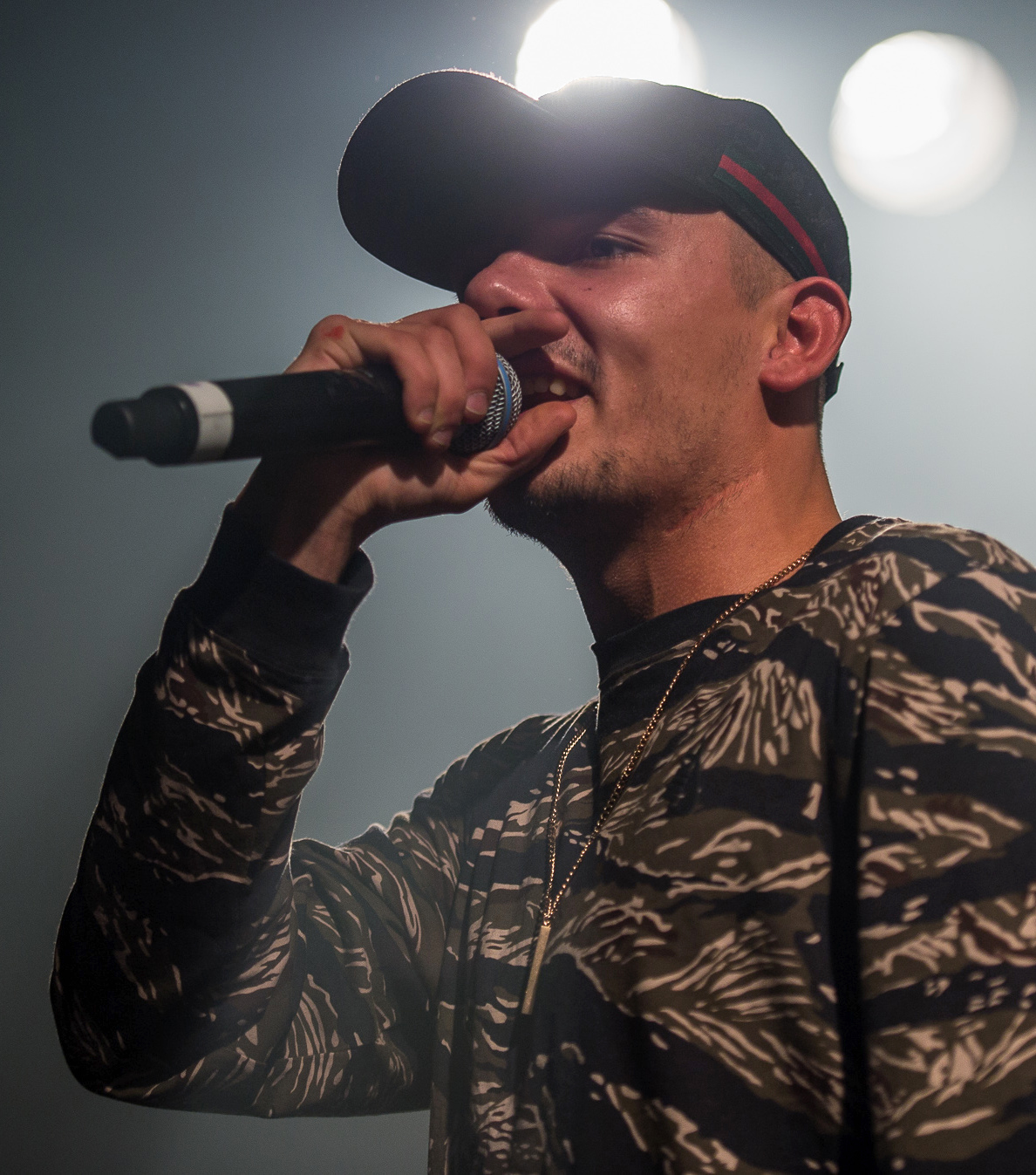
Capital Bra during a concert as part of his "Blyat" Tour in the Hirsch, Nuremberg, Germany in February 2018

German rapper Capital Bra has recorded material for his six studio albums, four extended plays and has collaborated with other artists for duets and featured songs on their respective albums. Following his departure from the German rap battle tournament Rap am Mittwoch in February 2015, Capital Bra started working on his debut studio album Kuku Bra (2016). All sixteen tracks of the record were written by him, alongside MMinx, Produes and produced solely the Hijackers.

Ten songs on his second studio album Makarov Komplex (2017), were produced by German producer Saven Musiq. His first extended play Ibrakadabra, was released alongside the before mentioned album and was completely written by him and again produced by Saven Musiq. Furthermore, he produced seven songs, including two singles, of Capital Bra's third studio album Blyat (2017). David Kraft and Tim Wilke, known as The Cratez began producing for him on this record and produced nine of the tracks, including one single. His fourth studio album Berlin lebt was released nine months later in June 2018 and was entirely produced by The Cratez, with Freek Van Workum co-producing on "Darby" and Young Taylor on "Neymar". The simultaneously released 5 Songs in einer Nacht EP, was completely produced by The Cratez. The follow-up Allein, released in November 2018 was mostly produced by Beatzarre and Djorkaeff, who are credited on seven songs, including two singles.

== Songs ==
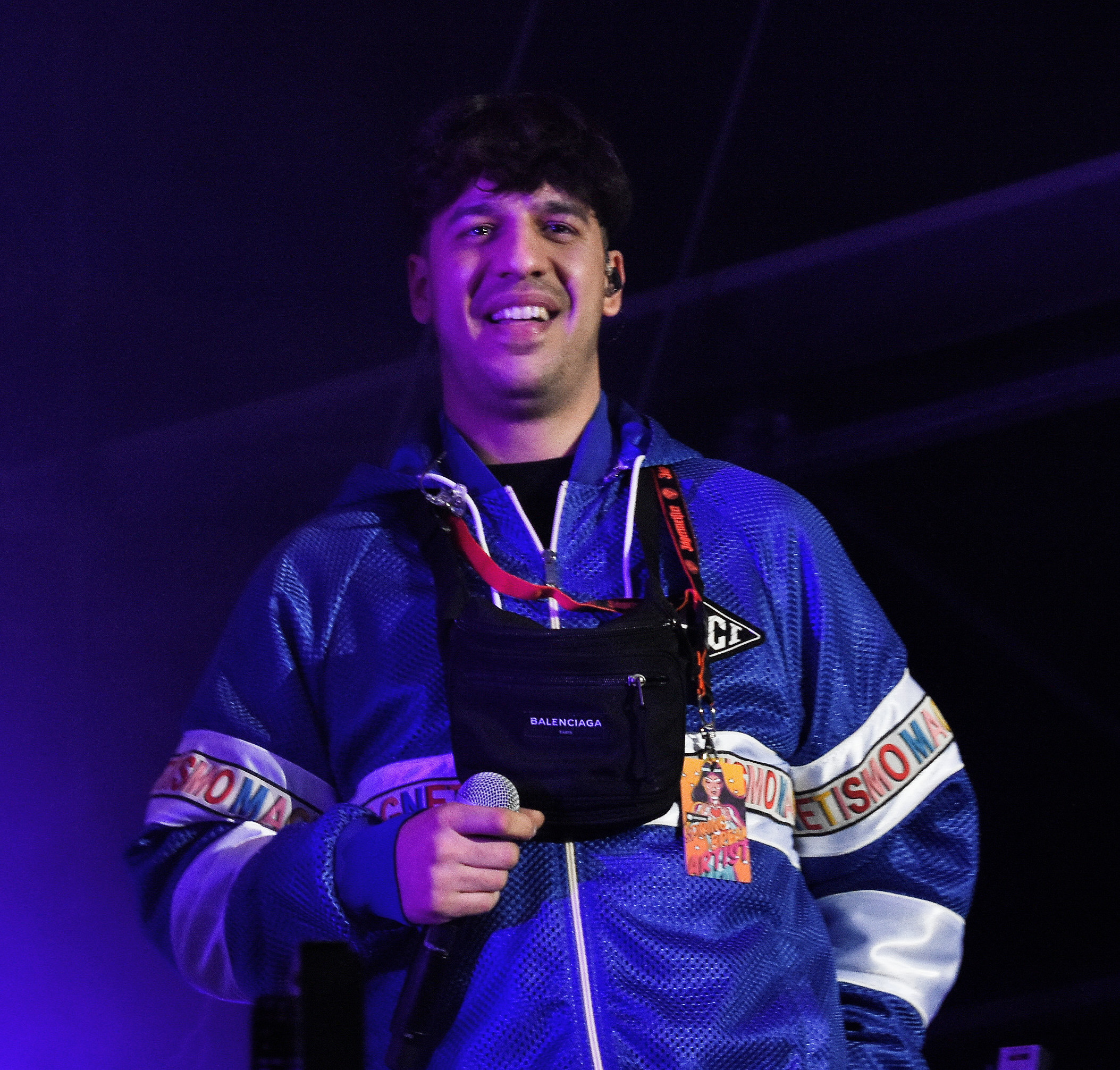
German rapper Ufo361 (pictured in 2018) co-wrote "Ala Ba Ba" and appeared as a featured rapper. Furthermore they collaborated on two other songs.

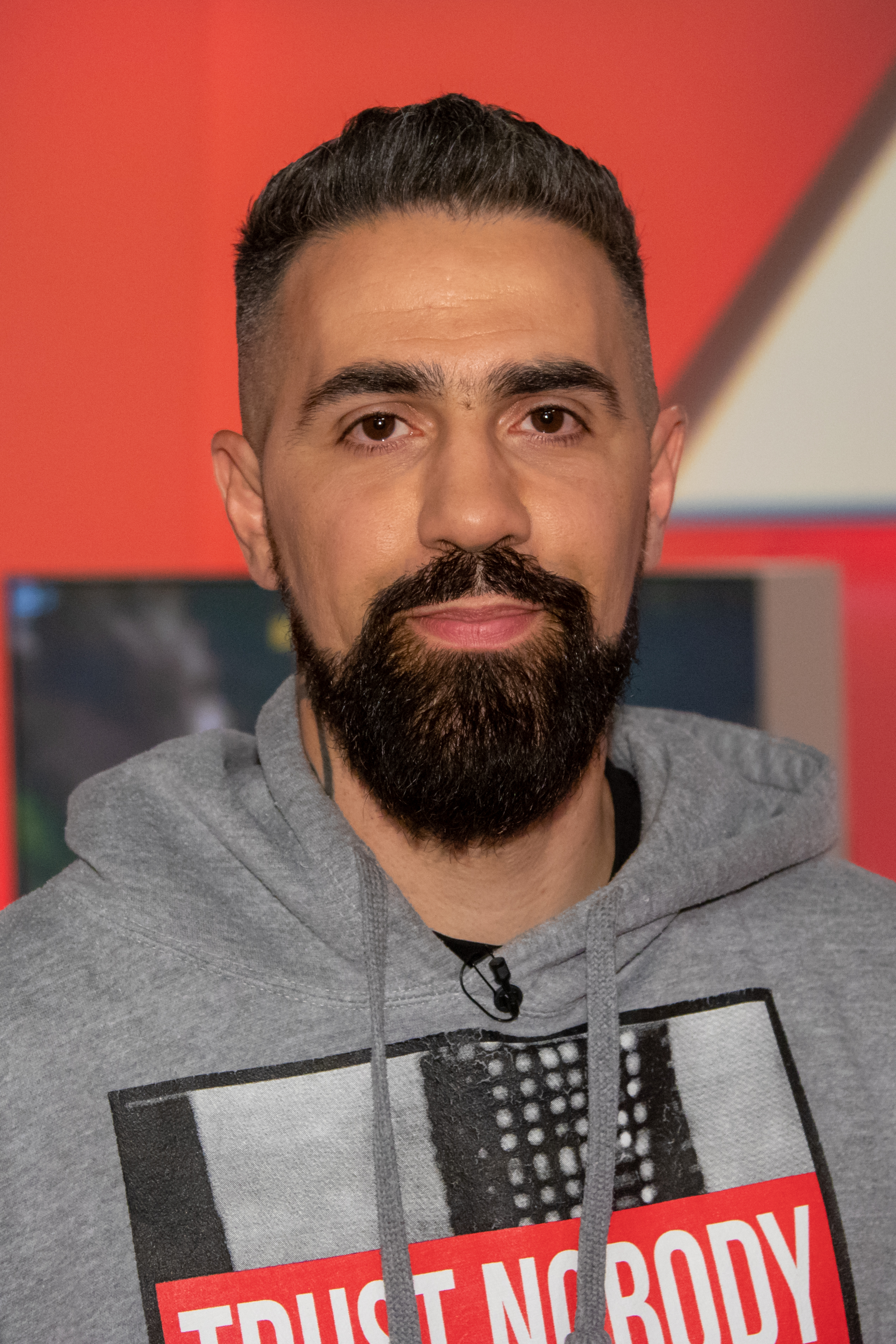
German rapper Bushido (pictured in 2018) produced "Allein".

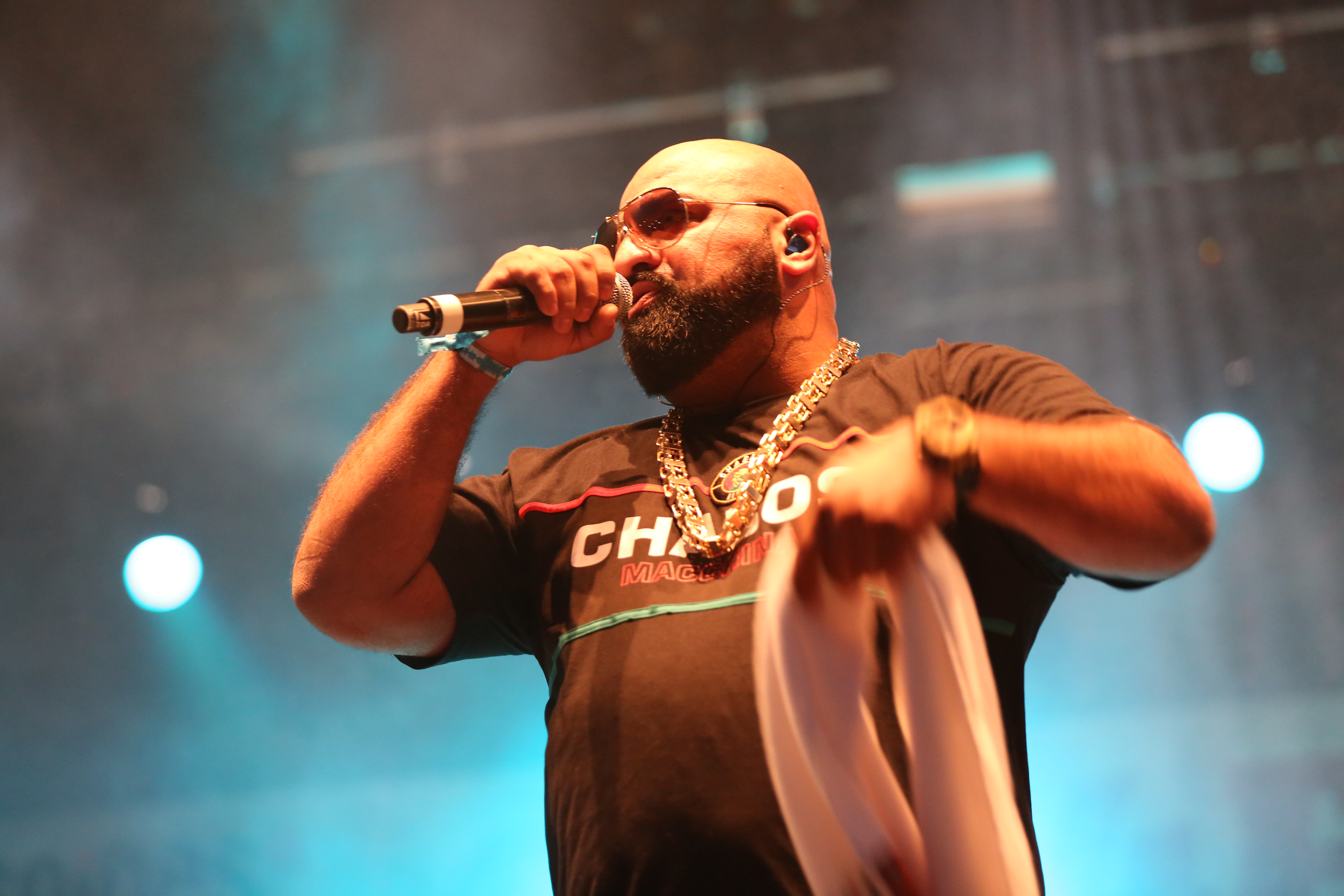
German rapper Xatar (pictured in 2016) co-wrote "Ich liebe es" and appeared as a featured rapper.

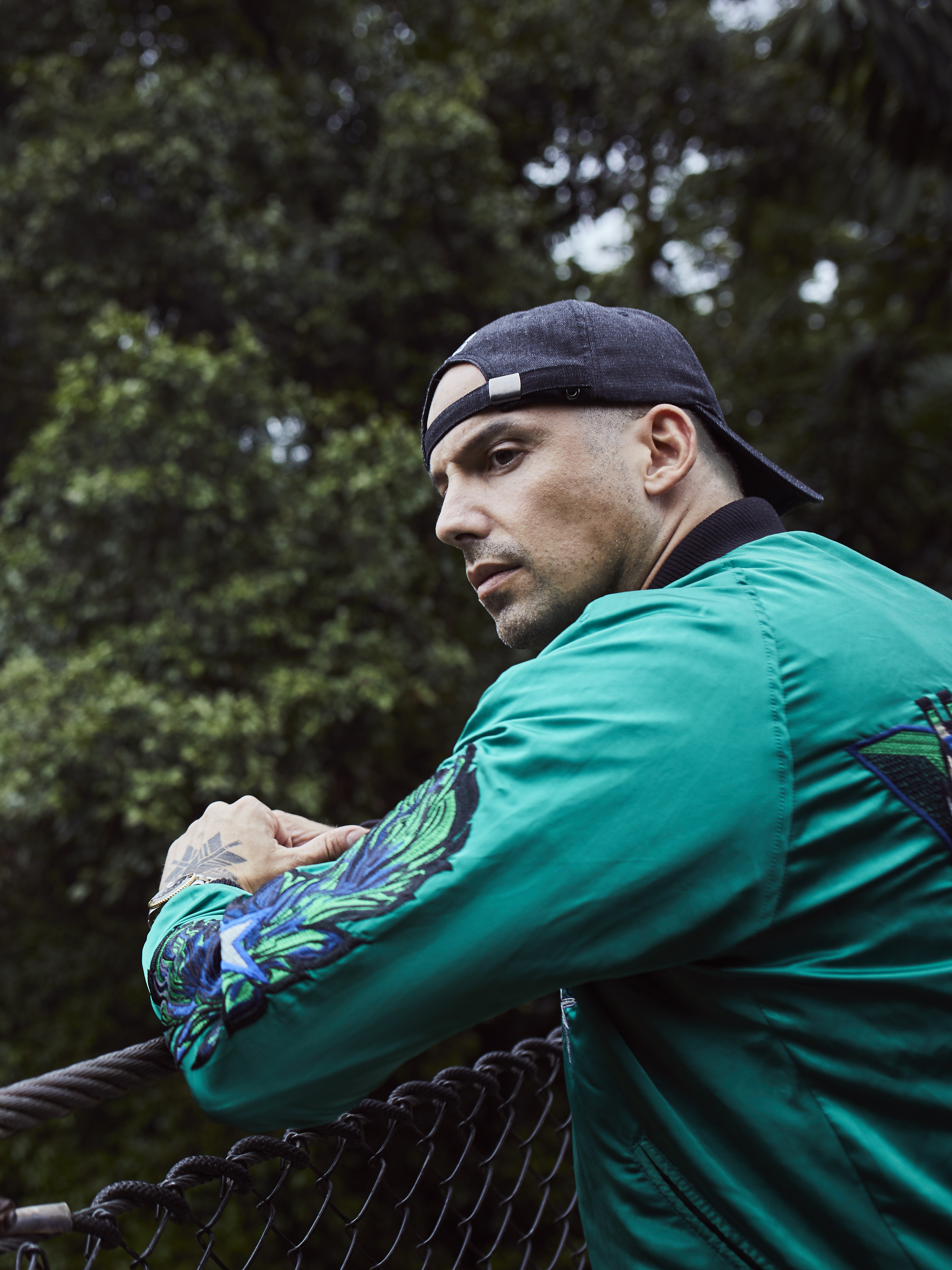
Austrian rapper and producer RAF Camora (pictured in 2018) co-wrote "Olé Olé" and appeared as a featured rapper.

Key
†	Indicates single release
‡	Indicates songs only released through a music video
#	Indicates a cover

Song	Writer(s)	Album(s)	Year	Ref.
"5 Songs in einer Nacht" †	Vladislav Balovatsky	Berlin lebt	2018	
"32 Bars"	Vladislav Balovatsky	Oh Kolleg	2017	
"300 Grad" † (featuring Kontra K & Joshi Mizu)	Vladislav Balovatsky, Maximilian Diehn, Joseph Valenzuela	Makarov Komplex	2017	
"Ala Ba Ba" † (featuring Ufo361)	Vladislav Balovatsky, Ufuk Bayraktar	Makarov Komplex	2017	
"Albtraum"	Vladislav Balovatsky	Makarov Komplex	2017	
"Allein" †	Vladislav Balovatsky; Anis Ferchichi, Tower Beatz	Allein	2018	
"Alle mit" (featuring Samra)	Vladislav Balovatsky; Hussein Akkouche	Fickt euch alle EP	2018	
"Alles schmeckt gleich" ‡	Unknown	Music video release only	2018	
"Akhis aus Kosovo"	Vladislav Balovatsky, MMinx, Produes	Kuku Bra	2016	
"Alle meine Jungs"	Vladislav Balovatsky	Makarov Komplex	2017	
"Alles kaputt"	Vladislav Balovatsky, MMinx, Produes	Kuku Bra	2016	
"Anders als die" (featuring Bausa)	Vladislav Balovatsky, Julian Otto	5 Songs in einer Nacht EP	2018	
"Augen auf" ‡ (featuring Bassam Khan)	Unknown	Music video release only	2014	
"Baba Flow"	Vladislav Balovatsky	Berlin lebt	2018	
"Baller deine Gang Weg" † (featuring Samra)	Vladislav Balovatsky, Hussein Akkouche	Fickt euch alle EP	2018	
"Ballert"	Vladislav Balovatsky	Berlin lebt	2018	
"Benz Diggi" (featuring Samra)	Vladislav Balovatsky, Hussein Akkouche	Allein	2018	
"Benzema" †	Vladislav Balovatsky	CB6	2018	
"Berlin lebt" †	Vladislav Balovatsky	Berlin lebt	2018	
"Blei auf der Stirn" (featuring King Khalil)	Vladislav Balovatsky, Kalil Aubeidy	Ibrakadabra	2017	
"BMW Alpina"	Vladislav Balovatsky	Blyat	2017	
"Bruda" (featuring Massiv & Kay Ay)	Vladislav Balovatsky, MMinx, Produes, Wasiem Taha	Kuku Bra	2016	
"Bra" ‡	Unknown	Music video release only	2015	
"Bra hinter dir"	Vladislav Balovatsky, MMinx, Produes	Kuku Bra	2016	
"Bratan ist OK"	Vladislav Balovatsky	Ibrakadabra	2017	
"Bra macht die Uzi" ‡	Unknown	Music video release only	2015	
"Bra macht die AK" (featuring AK Ausserkontrolle)	Vladislav Balovatsky, Davut Althundal	Blyat	2017	
"Bra macht die Uzi" †	Vladislav Balovatsky, MMinx, Produes	Kuku Bra	2016	
"Braun, gelb, lila"	Vladislav Balovatsky, MMinx, Produes	Kuku Bra	2016	
"Capital Bra Je m'appelle" †	Vladislav Balovatsky	CB6	2019	
"Cherry Lady" #	Vladislav Balovatsky, Dieter Bohlen	TBA	2019	
"Chinchilla" † (Summer Cem featuring KC Rebell & Capital Bra)	Cem Toraman, Vladislav Balovatsky, Hüseyin Köksecen	Endstufe	2018	
"Columbia" ‡	Unknown	Music video release only	2014	
"Darby" (featuring AK Ausserkontrolle)	Vladislav Balovatsky, Davut Altundal	Berlin lebt	2018	
"Das Leben ist so" (featuring Olexesh)	Vladislav Balovatsky; Ufuk Bayraktar	Blyat	2017	
"Dealer" (featuring Joshi Mizu)	Vladislav Balovatsky, Josef Valenzuela	5 Songs in einer Nacht EP	2018	
"Dealer aus Prinzip" † (King Khalil featuring Capital Bra)	Kalil Aubeidy, Vladislav Balovatsky, David Kraft	Kuku Effekt	2018	
"Die Echten" † (featuring AK Ausserkontrolle)	Vladislav Balovatsky, Olexij Kosarev	Makarov Komplex	2017	
"Du siehst"	Vladislav Balovatsky, MMinx, Produes	Kuku Bra	2016	
"Erklärt" ‡	Unknown	Music video release only	2018	
"Es geht um Capital"	Vladislav Balovatsky	Ibrakadabra	2017	
"Es geht ums Geschäft" †	Vladislav Balovatsky	Makarov Komplex	2017	
"Falsche Gesichter"	Vladislav Balovatsky, MMinx, Produes	Kuku Bra	2016	
"Feinde reden viel" (featuring King Khalil)	Vladislav Balovatsky, Kalil Aubeidy	Oh Kolleg	2017	
"Fightclub" † (featuring Samra & AK Ausserkontrolle)	Vladislav Balovatsky, Hussein Akkouche, Davut Altundal	Allein	2018	
"Fluchtwagen glänzen" † (featuring King Khalil)	Vladislav Balovatsky, MMinx, Produes, Khalil Aubeidy	Kuku Bra	2016	
"Für euch alle" † (Bushido featuring Samra & Capital Bra)	Anis Ferchichi, Vladislav Balovatsky, Hussein Akkouche	Mythos	2018	
"Für Brüder" ‡	Unknown	Music video release only	2018	
"Gekämpft" ‡	Unknown	Music video release only	2018	
"Geld machen"	Vladislav Balovatsky	Makarov Komplex	2017	
"Ghetto Massari" †	Vladislav Balovatsky	Blyat	2017	
"Giselle Bündchen"	Vladislav Balovatsky	Berlin lebt	2018	
"Glaub mir"	Vladislav Balovatsky	Berlin lebt	2018	
"Gucci Capi Tief"	Vladislav Balovatsky, Vincent Stein, Konstantin Scherer	Allein	2018	
"Gutes Herz" (featuring KC Rebell)	Vladislav Balovatsky, Hüseyin Kökseçen	Berlin lebt	2018	
"heute gemacht" ‡	Unknown	Music video release only	2018	
"Hubba Bubba" † (Massiv featuring Capital Bra)	Wasiem Taha, Vladislav Balovatsky	M10 II	2018	
"Ich liebe es" † (featuring Xatar & Samy)	Vladislav Balovatsky, Giwar Hajabi, Sami Abdel Hadi	Allein	2018	
"Ich mach alles kaputt" †	Vladislav Balovatsky	Makarov Komplex	2017	
"In der Stellung von Balotelli"	Vladislav Balovatsky	Ibrakadabra	2017	
"Intro"	Vladislav Balovatsky, MMinx, Produes	Kuku Bra	2016	
"Intro"	Vladislav Balovatsky	Makarov Komplex	2017	
"Intro"	Vladislav Balovatsky	Blyat	2017	
"irgend was anderes" ‡	Unknown	Music video release only	2018	
"Ja Bra"	Vladislav Balovatsky	Ibrakadabra	2017	
"Ja Bra 2"	Vladislav Balovatsky	5 Songs in einer Nacht EP	2018	
"Ja Salam"	Vladislav Balovatsky	Allein	2018	
"Lass mal diese" (featuring Olexesh)	Vladislav Balovatsky, Vincent Stein, Konstantin Scherer, Olexij Kossarew	Allein	2018	
"Lass uns" (featuring Joshi Mizu)	Vladislav Balovatsky, Josef Valenzuela	Oh Kolleg	2017	
"Kein Krieg in Ukraine" ‡	Unknown	Music video release only	2014	
"Kennzeichen B–TK" (featuring King Khalil)	Vladislav Balovatsky, Kalil Aubeidy	Berlin lebt	2018	
"Kokayn" † (Kalazh44 featuring Capital Bra)	Kalazh44, Vladislav Balovatsky	Single release only	2018	
"Kuku 187" (featuring LX)	Vladislav Balovatsky, Alexander Gabriel	Makarov Komplex	2017	
"Kuku Habibi" † (featuring King Khalil)	Vladislav Balovatsky, MMinx, Produes, Khalil Aubeidy	Kuku Bra	2016	
"Kuku SLS" † (featuring Gringo44)	Vladislav Balovatsky, Ilfan Kalender	Blyat	2017	
"Liebe" ‡	Unknown	Music video release only	2018	
"Mademoiselle"	Vladislav Balovatsky	Blyat	2017	
"Mama bitte wein nicht"	Vladislav Balovatsky	Makarov Komplex	2017	
"Maybach" (featuring Bushido)	Vladislav Balovatsky, Anis Mohamed Youssef Ferchichi	Allein	2018	
"Meine Welt" (featuring King Khalil)	Vladislav Balovatsky, Kalil Aubeidy	Berlin lebt	2018	
"Melodien" † (featuring Juju)	Vladislav Balovatsky, Judith Wessendorf	Fickt euch alle EP	2018	
"Money Gucci Bitches"	Vladislav Balovatsky	Fickt euch alle EP	2018	
"Na Na Na" (featuring Ufo361)	Vladislav Balovatsky; Ufuk Bayraktar	Blyat	2017	
"Neymar" † (featuring Ufo361)	Vladislav Balovatsky, Ufuk Bayraktar	Berlin lebt	2018	
"Nix zu reden"	Vladislav Balovatsky	Makarov Komplex	2017	
"Nur noch Gucci" †	Vladislav Balovatsky	Blyat	2017	
"Olé Olé" † (featuring RAF Camora & Joshi Mizu)	Vladislav Balovatsky, Raphael Ragucci, Joseph Valenzuela	Blyat	2017	
"One Night Stand" †	Vladislav Balovatsky	Berlin lebt	2018	
"Packen"	Vladislav Balovatsky	Berlin lebt	2018	
"Paff Paff & Weiter" † (Gzuz featuring Capital Bra)	Kristoffer Klauß, Vladislav Balovatsky	High & Hungrig 2 – Bonus EP	2016	
"Paff Paff Weiter 2" (featuring Gzuz)	Vladislav Balovatsky, Kristoffer Jonas Klauss	Blyat	2017	
"Panzer, Tiger" (featuring Farid Bang)	Vladislav Balovatsky, Farid El Abdellaoui	Berlin lebt	2018	
"Paradox" (featuring Prinz Pi)	Vladislav Balovatsky, Friedrich Kautz	Oh Kolleg	2017	
"Phantom" ‡ (featuring Noah)	Unknown	Music video release only	2018	
"Pic"	Vladislav Balovatsky, MMinx, Produes	Kuku Bra	2016	
"Power" † (Ufo361 featuring Capital Bra)	Ufuk Bayraktar, Vladislav Balovatsky	808	2018	
"Prinzessa" †	Vladislav Balovatsky	CB6	2018	
"Richtung Para" (featuring Sido)	Vladislav Balovatsky, Paul Würdig	Blyat	2017	
"Roli Glitzer Glitzer" † (featuring Luciano & Eno)	Vladislav Balovatsky, Patrick Großmann, Ensar Albayrak, Vincent Stein, Konstantin Scherer	Allein	2018	
"Roli von Pablo" (featuring Kay Ay)	Vladislav Balovatsky	5 Songs in einer Nacht EP	2018	
"Roll noch einen" (featuring King Khalil)	Vladislav Balovatsky, Kalil Aubeidy	Oh Kolleg	2017	
"RS6" ‡	Unknown	Music video release only	2018	
"Safari" (featuring Zuna)	Vladislav Balovatsky, Ghassan Zeaiter	Allein	2018	
"Schüsse fallen" (featuring Samra)	Vladislav Balovatsky, Hussein Akkouche	Allein	2018	
"Selbst verdient"	Vladislav Balovatsky	Allein	2018	
"Sonnenblank Flavour" † (featuring Samra)	Vladislav Balovatsky, Hussein Akkouche	Fickt euch alle EP	2018	
"Roli Glitzer Glitzer" † (featuring Luciano & Eno)	Vladislav Balovatsky, Patrick Großmann, Ensar Albayrak, Vincent Stein, Konstantin Scherer	Allein	2018	
"Teuer"	Vladislav Balovatsky	Single release only	2019	
"Trikot von Turin"	Vladislav Balovatsky	Allein	2018	
"Sturmmaske auf (Intro) Gold war gestern (Remix)" † (Kollegah & Farid Bang featuring Capital Bra, King Khalil, Summer Cem & 18 Karat) (Note: Following Capital Bra's signing to ersguterjunge in July 2018, Kollegah and Farid Bang released a second version of the remix with him being replaced to Jigzaw.)	Felix Blume, Farid El Abdellaoui, Vladislav Balovatsky, Cem Toraman, Kalil Aubeidy, 18 Karat	Platin war gestern	2018	
"Verrückte Leute"	Vladislav Balovatsky, MMinx, Produes	Kuku Bra	2016	
"Vladimir Putin"	Vladislav Balovatsky, MMinx, Produes	Kuku Bra	2016	
"Wann dann" (featuring Capital T)	Vladislav Balovatsky, Trim Ademi	Berlin lebt	2018	
"Was 2 hol 10" (featuring Bonez MC & Haze)	Vladislav Balovatsky, John Lorenz Moser, Maxwell Kwabena Schaden	Makarov Komplex	2017	
"Was wollen die"	Vladislav Balovatsky	5 Songs in einer Nacht EP	2018	
"Wer hoch fliegt, fällt tief" †	Vladislav Balovatsky	Blyat	2017	
"Wie alles begann"	Vladislav Balovatsky	Blyat	2017	
"Wir sind stabil"	Vladislav Balovatsky, MMinx, Produes	Kuku Bra	2016	
"Wir ticken" (featuring Samra)	Vladislav Balovatsky, Hussein Akkouche	TBA	2019	
"Zieh zieh zieh" (featuring King Khalil)	Vladislav Balovatsky, Khalil Aubeidy	Makarov Komplex	2017	
"Zinedine" † (Xatar featuring Capital Bra)	Giwar Hajabi, Vladislav Balovatsky	Alles oder Nix II	2018	
"Zu viel, zu wenig" (featuring Olexesh)	Vladislav Balovatsky, MMinx, Produes, Olexij Kossarew	Kuku Bra	2016	
"Zweistellige Haftstrafen" † (featuring King Khalil)	Vladislav Balovatsky, Khalil Aubeidy	Blyat	2017	
