= Capital Bra discography =

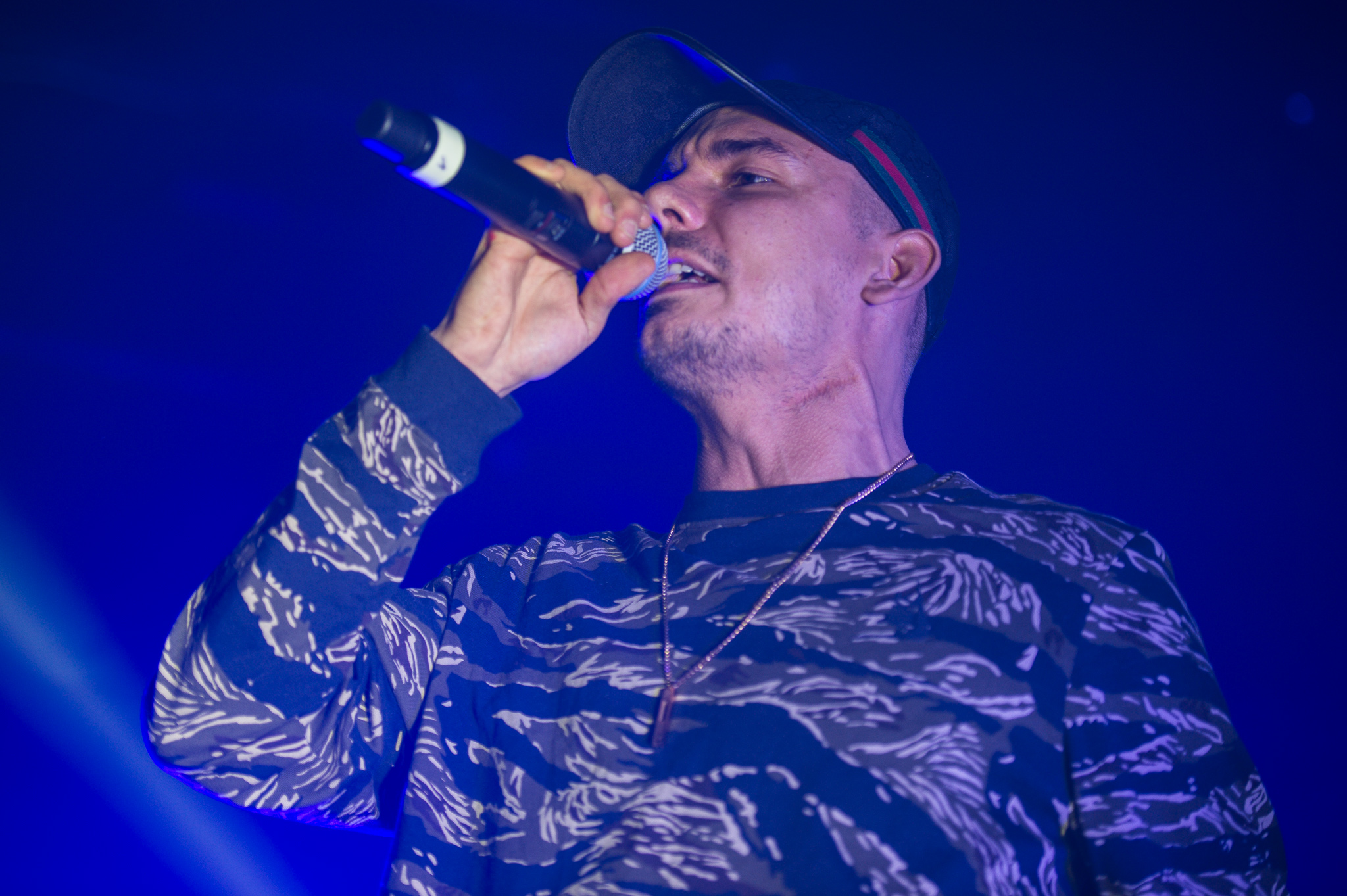
- Capital Bra during a concert in Nuremberg, February 2018
- Studio albums: 9
- EPs: 4
- Live albums: 2
- Singles: 70
- Music videos: 23

German rapper Capital Bra (Note: Capital Bra started his career under the pseudonym "Capital". His debut studio album, Kuku Bra, and first ten singles were released under the name "Capital".) has released nine studio albums, four extended plays (EPs) and seventy singles (including thirteen as featured artist). In 2016, he premiered his first studio album Kuku Bra which debuted at number 32 on the German and at number 61 on the Austrian album charts. In February 2017, Capital Bra released his second studio album Makarov Komplex which peaked within the top five in Austria, Germany and in Switzerland, spawning four singles of which "Es geht ums Geschäft" entered the charts at number 76 in Germany. The limited box set of Makarov Komplex included his first EP Oh Kolleg. In May of the same year, he distributed his second EP Ibrakadabra to minor commercial success in Switzerland.

In June 2017, Capital Bra announced his third studio album Blyat, which was released three months later and debuted at number three in Germany and Austria, and at number five in Switzerland. The record spawned six singles, including "Nur noch Gucci" and "Olé olé" which were certified gold in Germany. Capital Bra's fourth album Berlin lebt followed in June 2018 and topped the charts in German-speaking Europe. A week prior, he split from his record label Team Kuku, because of differences in interests. Four singles were promoted to promote the record—"5 Songs in einer Nacht", "Neymar", "One Night Stand" and "Berlin lebt"—all of which reached number one in Germany and the top ten in Austria and Switzerland. In early July, he signed a record deal with ersguterjunge, the label of fellow German rapper Bushido. His first single released under ersguterjunge, "Melodien", became his fifth consecutive single to reach the pole position of the German charts. In August 2018 the single set the record for the most streams in Germany in one day and in one week.

The rapper's fifth studio album, Allein was announced in late August 2018 and was released on 2 November 2018, again debuting within the top five of German-speaking Europe. His fourth extended play and first project under ersguterjunge were made available in September 2018, as part of the boxset of Bushido's thirteenth studio album Mythos. Capital Bra's sixth studio album CB6 was released on 12 April 2019 and supported through five singles; four of which reached the pole position of the German charts.

== Albums ==
=== Studio albums ===
List of studio albums, with chart positions
Title	Album details	Peak chart positions				Certifications
Title	Album details	GER	GER HH	AUT	SWI	Certifications
Kuku Bra	Released: 29 January 2016; Label: Baba City, Chapter One, Universal; Formats: CD, digital download	32	4	61	—	
Makarov Komplex	Released: 3 February 2017; Label: Auf!Keinen!Fall!, Chapter One, Team Kuku; Formats: CD, digital download	2	1	1	5	
Blyat	Released: 29 September 2017; Label: Auf!Keinen!Fall!, Team Kuku; Formats: CD, digital download	3	2	3	5	BVMI: Gold
Berlin lebt	Released: 22 June 2018; Label: Team Kuku, Sony Music; Formats: CD, digital download	1	1	1	1	BVMI: Gold
Allein	Released: 2 November 2018; Label: Team Kuku, Sony Music; Formats: digital download	2	1	3	5	
CB6	Released: 12 April 2019; Label: Urban, Bra Music; Formats: CD, digital download	1	1	1	2	BVMI: Gold
CB7	Released: 18 September 2020; Label: Urban, Bra Music; Formats: CD, digital download	1	—	1	1	
8	Released: 11 March 2022; Label: Urban, Bra Music; Formats: CD, digital download	4	—	3	6	
Vladyslav	Released: 11 April 2024; Label: Bra Music; Formats: CD, digital download	38	—	56	23	
"—" denotes a release that did not chart or was not released in that territory.

=== Collaborative albums ===
Title	Album details	Peak chart positions			Certifications
Title	Album details	GER	AUT	SWI	Certifications
Berlin lebt 2 (with Samra)	Released: 4 October 2019; Label: Bra Music, Urban; Formats: CD, digital download	1	1	1	BVMI: Gold
Deutschrap brandneu (with Farid Bang)	Released: 15 July 2022; Label: Banger Musik, Bra Music; Formats: CD, digital download	1	2	1	

=== Live albums ===
List of live albums
Title	Album details
Die Echte – Tour DVD in Berlin (with King Khalil & AK Ausserkontrolle)	Released: 29 September 2017; Label: Auf!Keinen!Fall!, Team Kuku; Formats: DVD

== Extended plays ==
List of extended plays, with chart positions
Title	EP details	Peak
Title	EP details	SWI
Oh Kolleg	Released: 3 February 2017; Label: Auf!Keinen!Fall!, Chapter One; Formats: CD, (Note: The CD of Oh Kolleg was exclusively distributed through the box set of Makarov Complex.) digital download	—
Ibrakadabra	Released: 9 May 2017; Label: Auf!Keinen!Fall!, Chapter One; Formats: Digital download	77
5 Songs in einer Nacht	Released: 22 June 2018; Label: Team Kuku, Sony Music; Formats: CD, (Note: The CD of 5 Songs in einer Nacht was exclusively distributed through the box set of Berlin lebt.) digital download	—
Fickt euch alle EP	Released: 28 September 2018; Label: ersguterjunge; Formats: CD (Note: The EP was exclusively distributed through the box set of Mythos.)	—
"—" denotes a release that did not chart or was not released in that territory.

== Singles ==
=== As lead artist ===
List of singles as lead artist, with chart positions and certifications
Title	Year	Peak chart positions			Certifications	Album
Title	Year	GER	AUT	SWI	Certifications	Album
"Kuku Habibi" (featuring King Khalil)	2016	—	—	—		Kuku Bra
"Fluchtwagen glänzen" (featuring King Khalil)	2016	—	—	—		Kuku Bra
"Kreide" (featuring King Khalil)	2016	—	—	—		Kuku Bra
"Ich mach alles Kaputt"	2016	—	—	—		Kuku Bra
"Ala Ba Ba" (featuring Ufo361)	2016	—	—	—		Makarov Komplex
"Es geht ums Geschäft"	2017	76	—	—		Makarov Komplex
"Geld machen" (featuring King Khalil)	2017	—	—	—		Makarov Komplex
"Die Echten" (featuring AK Ausserkontrolle)	2017	—	—	—		Makarov Komplex
"Nur noch Gucci"	2017	43	72	—	BVMI: Gold	Blyat
"Ghetto Massari"	2017	93	—	—		Blyat
"Olé olé" (featuring RAF Camora and Joshi Mizu)	2017	36	70	—	BVMI: Gold	Blyat
"Kuku SLS" (featuring Gringo44)	2017	74	—	—		Blyat
"Wer hoch fliegt fällt tief"	2017	77	—	—		Blyat
"Zweistellige Haftstrafen" (featuring King Khalil)	2017	43	47	58		Blyat
"5 Songs in einer Nacht"	2018	1	2	8	BVMI: Gold	Berlin lebt
"Neymar" (featuring Ufo361)	2018	1	1	3	BVMI: Platinum	Berlin lebt
"One Night Stand"	2018	1	1	2	BVMI: Platinum	Berlin lebt
"Berlin lebt"	2018	1	1	2	BVMI: Gold	Berlin lebt
"Melodien" (featuring Juju)	2018	1	1	1	BVMI: Platinum	Fickt euch alle EP
"Fightclub" (featuring Samra and AK Ausserkontrolle)	2018	3	5	9		Allein
"Roli Glitzer Glitzer" (featuring Luciano and Eno)	2018	1	4	7		Allein
"Allein"	2018	2	2	4	BVMI: Gold	Allein
"Ich liebe es" (featuring Xatar and Samy)	2018	3	6	13	BVMI: Gold	Allein
"Feuer"	2018	4	8	11		Non-album single
"Benzema"	2018	1	2	2	BVMI: Platinum	CB6
"Prinzessa"	2019	1	1	1	BVMI: Platinum	CB6
"Teuer"	2019	—	—	—		Non-album singles
"Khabib" (with Gringo and Kalazh44 featuring Hasan.K)	2019	36	64	95		Non-album singles
"Capital Bra je m'appelle"	2019	3	1	4		CB6
"Dresscode Gucci" (as Joker Bra)	2019	56	—	—		Non-album single
"Wir ticken" (with Samra)	2019	1	1	1	BVMI: Gold	CB6
"Cherry Lady"	2019	1	1	1	BVMI: Platinum	Non-album single
"Rolex" (featuring Summer Cem and KC Rebell)	2019	2	1	1	BVMI: Gold	CB6
"Wieder Lila" (with Samra)	2019	1	1	2	BVMI: Platinum	Berlin lebt 2
"Royal Rumble" (with Kalazh44 and Samra featuring Nimo and Luciano)	2019	1	3	4		Non-album single
"Tilidin" (with Samra)	2019	1	1	1	BVMI: 3× Gold; IFPI AUT: 2× Platinum	Berlin lebt 2
"Zombie" (with Samra)	2019	1	2	6	BVMI: Gold	Berlin lebt 2
"Nummer 1" (with Samra)	2019	1	1	2		Berlin lebt 2
"Huracan" (with Samra)	2019	3	2	3	BVMI: Gold	Berlin lebt 2
"110" (with Samra and Lea)	2019	1	2	2	BVMI: 3× Gold; IFPI AUT: Gold	Berlin lebt 2
"Berlin lebt wie nie zuvor" (with Samra)	2019	5	5	5		Berlin lebt 2
"Der Bratan bleibt der gleiche"	2019	1	1	2		Non-album singles
"Baby" (as Joker Bra with Vize)	2020	1	1	3	BVMI: Gold; IFPI AUT: Platinum	Non-album singles
"Amex Black" (as Joker Bra)	2020	14	15	31		Non-album singles
"100k Cash" (with Samra)	2020	3	2	3		Non-album singles
"Passt mir so gar nicht" (as Joker Bra)	2020	46	60	—		Non-album singles
"Berlin" (with Samra)	2020	2	2	3		Jibrail und Iblis
"365 Tage" (with Samra)	2020	4	4	7		Jibrail und Iblis
"Nicht verdient" (with Loredana)	2020	1	1	1	BVMI: Gold; IFPI AUT: Gold	CB7
"Komm komm"	2020	2	2	3		CB7
"Bam Bam" (with Gringo)	2020	26	31	—		Non-album single
"Ich weiß nicht mal wie sie heißt" (featuring Bozza)	2020	3	2	3	IFPI AUT: Gold	CB7
"Andere Welt" (with Clueso and KC Rebell)	2020	2	2	3	IFPI AUT: Gold	CB7
"Frühstück in Paris" (with Cro)	2020	1	1	3	IFPI AUT: Gold	Non-album singles
"Paradise" (as Joker Bra with Vize and Leony)	2020	4	2	98	BVMI: Gold	Non-album singles
"Berlin lebt immer noch"	2020	9	15	14		Non-album singles
"Einsam an der Spitze"	2020	2	2	5		CB7
"Frank Lucas" (as Joker Bra with Ramo)	2020	88	—	—		Non-album singles
"B.L.F.L." (with Azet)	2020	4	6	5		Non-album singles
"Aventador" (with Jamule)	2021	4	7	11		Non-album singles
"Unter verdacht" (with NGEE)	2021	8	8	9		Non-album singles
"Die zwei kenn ich"	2021	19	26	33		Non-album singles
"Mbappé"	2021	27	54	85		Non-album singles
"Die Wahrheit ist kein Hit"	2021	93	—	—		Non-album singles
"Hops"	2021	31	50	53		Non-album singles
"—" denotes a release that did not chart or was not released in that territory.

=== As featured artist ===
List of singles as featured artist, with chart positions
Title	Year	Peak chart positions			Certifications	Album
Title	Year	GER	AUT	SWI	Certifications	Album
"Paff Paff & Weiter" (Gzuz featuring Capital Bra)	2016	—	—	—		High & Hungrig 2 – Bonus EP
"Dealer aus Prinzip" (Kink Khalil featuring Capital Bra)	2018	—	—	—		Kuku Effekt
"Unterwegs" (Bausa featuring Capital Bra)	2018	76	—	—		Powerbausa
"Power" (Ufo361 featuring Capital Bra)	2018	7	21	54		808
"Kokayn" (Kalazh44 featuring Capital Bra)	2018	—	—	—		
"Sturmmaske auf (Remix)" (Kollegah and Farid Bang featuring Capital Bra, 18 Karat, King Khalil & Summer Cem)	2018	12	—	—		Platin war gestern
"Chinchilla" (Summer Cem featuring KC Rebell & Capital Bra)	2018	11	14	35		Endstufe
"Für euch alle" (Bushido featuring Samra & Capital Bra)	2018	1	1	2	BVMI: Gold	Mythos
"Hubba Bubba" (Massiv featuring Capital Bra)	2018	43	65	—		M10 Zwei
"Zinedine" (Xatar featuring Capital Bra)	2018	—	—	—		Alles oder Nix II
"Quapo" (Noah featuring Capital Bra)	2019	80	—	—		
"DNA" (KC Rebell featuring Summer Cem & Capital Bra)	2019	1	1	5	BVMI: Gold	Hasso
"Viva la Dealer" (SDP featuring Capital Bra)	2019	38	63	—	BVMI: Gold	Die unendlichste Geschichte
"Glitza" (Milonair featuring Haftbefehl & Joker Bra)	2019	44	—	—		G.T.A.
"Ghetto" (Samra featuring Capital Bra, Brudi30 and Kalazh44)	2019	9	17	24		
"Diamonds" (Summer Cem featuring Capital Bra)	2019	3	—	—		
"Yalla" (Capital T featuring Capital Bra)	2019	—	—	—		
"Imma Gute" (Milonair featuring Joker Bra)	2020	68	—	—		
"Amcaoğle" (KC Rebell and Summer Cem featuring Capital Bra)	2020	14	24	27		
"Hell" (PA Sports featuring Capital Bra)	2021	5	10	12		Streben nach Glück
"No Comprendo" (Jamule featuring Capital Bra)	2021	3	5	16		Sold
"Block" (Olexesh & Hell Yes featuring Joker Bra)	2021	45	—	—		
"Blessed" (Cro featuring Capital Bra)	2021	2	2	8		Trip
"Sommer" (Lea featuring Capital Bra)	2021	3	13	20		
"—" denotes a release that did not chart or was not released in that territory.

== Other charted songs ==
List of other charted songs, with chart positions
Title	Year	Peak chart positions			Certifications	Album
Title	Year	GER	AUT	SWI	Certifications	Album
"Kuku/187" (featuring Lx)	2017	84	—	—		Makarov Complex
"Na Na Na" (featuring Ufo361)	2017	33	—	54	BVMI: Gold	Blyat
"Paff Paff weiter 2" (featuring Gzuz)	2017	59	—	77		Blyat
"Das Leben ist so" (featuring Olexesh)	2017	64	—	—		Blyat
"Mademoiselle"	2017	84	—	—		Blyat
"Bra macht die AK"	2017	99	—	—		Blyat
"Kennzeichen B-TK" (featuring King Khalil)	2018	4	2	10		Berlin lebt
"Wann dann" (featuring Capital T)	2018	18	14	15		Berlin lebt
"Giselle Bündchen"	2018	20	21	—		Berlin lebt
"Darby" (featuring AK Ausserkontrolle)	2018	23	37	—		Berlin lebt
"Gutes Herz" (featuring KC Rebell)	2018	24	23	—		Berlin lebt
"Panzer, Tiger" (featuring Farid Bang)	2018	31	36	—		Berlin lebt
"Ballert"	2018	48	56	—		Berlin lebt
"Baba Flow"	2018	60	67	—		Berlin lebt
"Glaub mir"	2018	70	66	—		Berlin lebt
"Meine Welt" (featuring King Khalil)	2018	71	73	—		Berlin lebt
"Packen"	2018	75	—	—		Berlin lebt
"Maybach" (featuring Bushido)	2018	16	—	16		Allein
"Selbst verdient"	2018	19	—	—		Allein
"Schüsse fallen" (featuring Samra)	2018	40	—	—		Allein
"Lass mal diese" (featuring Olexesh)	2018	41	—	—		Allein
"Trikot von Turin"	2018	43	—	—		Allein
"Safari" (featuring Zuna)	2018	57	—	—		Allein
"Benz Diggi" (featuring Samra)	2018	59	—	—		Allein
"Ya Salam"	2018	68	—	—		Allein
"Gucci Capi Tief"	2018	74	—	—		Allein
"Bye Bye" (featuring Nimo)	2019	7	6	12		CB6
"Cabriolet"	2019	20	—	—		CB6
"Steh auf"	2019	21	—	—		CB6
"Click Click" (featuring Samra)	2019	22	—	—		CB6
"Van der Vaart" (featuring Nash)	2019	26	—	—		CB6
"Schon ok"	2019	30	—	—		CB6
"Sollte so sein"	2019	32	—	—		CB6
"Mexican Mafia"	2019	34	—	—		CB6
"Leg"	2019	37	—	—		CB6
"Kalt"	2019	39	—	—		CB6
"Schwarze Locken"	2019	48	—	—		CB6
"Blech"	2019	50	—	—		CB6
"Für uns"	2019	62	—	—		CB6
"Purple Rain" (with Samra and Santos)	2019	50	—	—		Berlin lebt 2
"Lieber Gott" (with Samra)	2019	62	—	—		Berlin lebt 2
"So alleine" (with Samra)	2019	87	—	—		Berlin lebt 2
"Tief in die Nacht" (with Samra)	2020	—	35	37		Jibrail und Iblis
"7 Stunden" (with Lea)	2020	10	14	27	IFPI SWI: Gold	Treppenhaus
"Guerilla" (Farid Bang featuring Samra and Capital Bra)	2020	—	59	50		Genkidama
"Alles dreht sich" (Kontra K featuring Capital Bra)	2020	9	27	51		Vollmond
"White Nights" (Kalazh44 featuring Capital Bra)	2020	42	—	—		Dreckig reden sauber flow'n
"Makarov Komplex II"	2020	—	22	31		CB7
"Wenn ich will" (featuring Loredana)	2020	—	—	78		CB7
"—" denotes a release that did not chart or was not released in that territory.

== Guest appearances ==
List of non-single guest appearances with other performing artists
Title	Year	Other artist(s)	Album
"Kein Erbarmen"	2016	Ufo361	Ich bin 2 Berliner
"Wer"	2017	Ufo361, Xatar	Ich bin 3 Berliner
"Wer weiß das schon"	2017	AK Ausserkontrolle	A.S.S.N
"Ich wollte niemals rappen"	2017	Magnis	Grenzenlos
"Bis sich alles dreht"	2017	Celo & Abdi	Diaspora
"Glück"	2017	Joshi Mizu	Kaviar & Toast
"Frisch aus dem Block"	2018	Olexesh	Rolexesh
"Stapel Cash"	2018	King Khalil	Kuku Effekt
"An der Bong"	2018	King Khalil	Kuku Effekt
"Steine aus dem Weg"	2018	King Khalil	Kuku Effekt
"Alles kommt wie es muss"	2018	King Khalil	Kuku Effekt
"Komplett lila"	2018	King Khalil, Kay Ay	Kuku Effekt
"Inshallah"	2018	Bushido	Mythos
"Guap Gang"	2018	Luciano	L.O.C.O.
Viva la Dealer"	2019	SDP	Die Unendlichste Geschichte
