= Luciano (rapper) =

German rapper (born 1994)

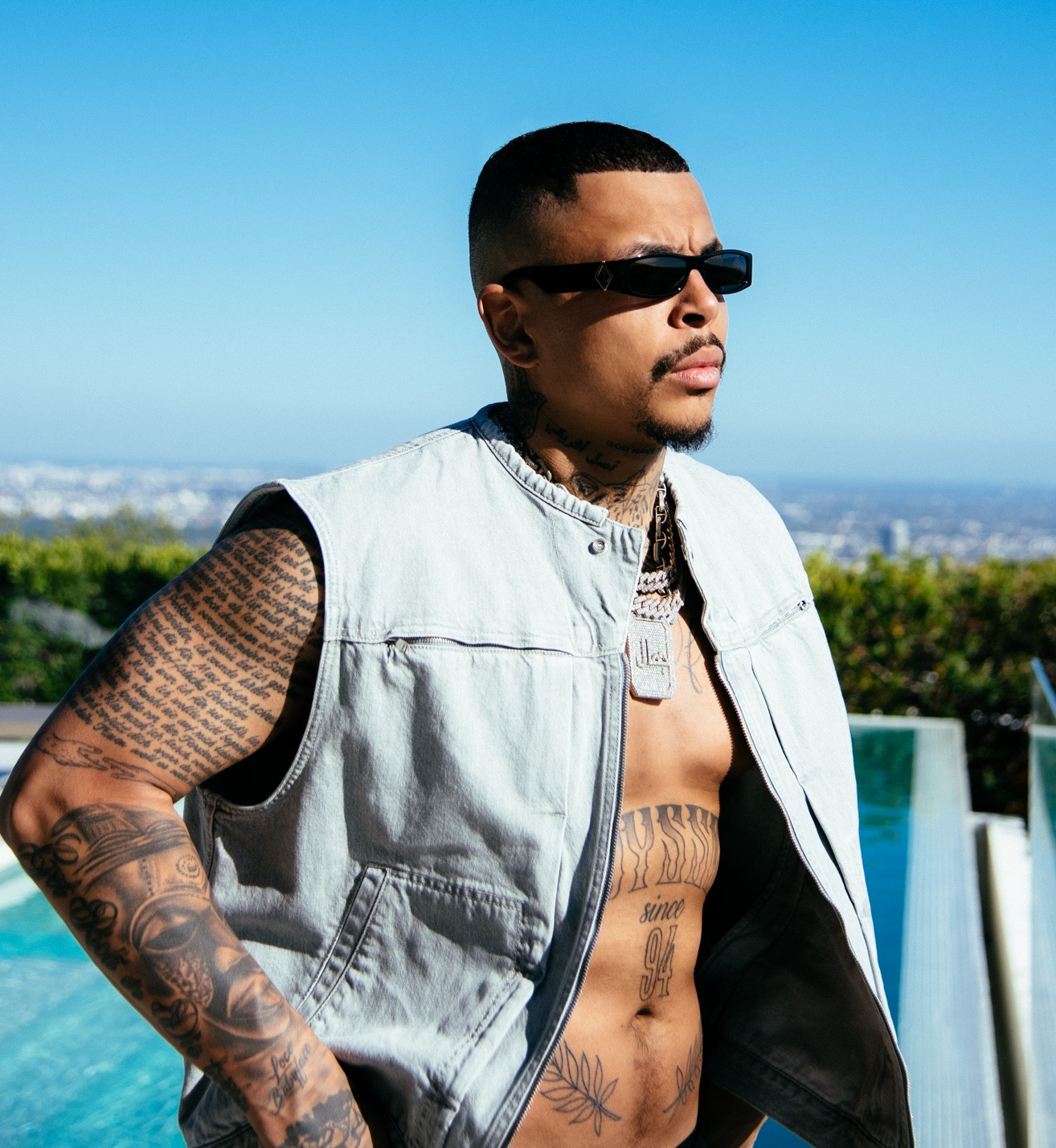
- Luciano in 2022

Background information
- Born: Patrick Großmann; 28 January 1994 (age 32); Bautzen, Germany
- Origin: Berlin, Germany
- Genres: Trap; drill; pop rap
- Occupations: Rapper; songwriter
- Years active: 2012–present

Patrick Großmann (born 28 January 1994), known professionally as Luciano, is a German rapper.

The son of a Mozambican father and a German mother, Luciano grew up mostly in the Schöneberg district of Berlin. He published his first pieces on the Locosquad YouTube channel. A little later followed the first mixtape 12812. He achieved his breakthrough with the piece Jagen die Mio, which he published with his friend Nikky Santoro. This was followed by another mixtape called Banditorinho.

He is a member of Locosquad and a part of the rap duo $kelleto and Azzi Memo. His first song was produced by Skaf Films. At the time producer Gentian was the director. As of March 2019, his highest solo single placing in Germany is number three with the song "Meer". He has also reached number one as a featured artist on Capital Bra's "Roli Glitzer Glitzer".

== Discography ==
=== Studio albums ===
Title	Album details	Peak chart positions		
Title	Album details	GER	AUT	SWI
Eiskalt	Released: 17 November 2017; Label: Urban, Universal; Formats: CD, digital download, streaming	4	14	15
L.O.C.O.	Released: 23 November 2018; Label: Urban, Universal; Formats: CD, digital download, streaming	4	6	4
Millies	Released: 30 August 2019; Label: Urban, Universal; Formats: CD, digital download, streaming	4	5	4
Exot	Released: 24 July 2020; Label: Urban, Universal; Formats: CD, digital download, streaming	6	3	3
Aqua	Released: 2 July 2021; Label: Urban, Universal; Formats: CD, digital download, streaming	3	2	1
Majestic	Released: 30 September 2022; Label: Urban, Universal; Formats: CD, digital download, streaming	2	3	2
Seductive	Released: 8 February 2024; Label: Urban, Universal; Formats: CD, digital download, streaming	1	2	1
Unlock	Released: 27 November 2025; Label: Urban, Universal; Formats: CD, digital download, streaming	8	22	4

=== Mixtapes ===
Title	Year	Peak chart positions		
Title	Year	GER	AUT	SWI
Locosquad präsentiert 12812 (with Nikky Santoro)	2016	—	—	—
Banditorinho	2017	21	33	34

=== Singles ===
==== As lead artist ====
Title	Year	Peak chart positions			Album
Title	Year	GER	AUT	SWI	Album
"code red"	2017	75	—	—	Eiskalt
"A4"	2017	55	—	—	Eiskalt
"Flex"	2017	76	—	—	Eiskalt
"Vorankommen"	2017	36	—	—	Eiskalt
"Airmax gegen Kopf" (with Dardan)	2018	28	62	71	Non-album single
"Roli"	2018	34	67	87	L.O.C.O.
"Ballin"	2018	10	23	23	L.O.C.O.
"MoneyGram"	2018	7	9	11	L.O.C.O.
"Meer"	2018	3	8	8	L.O.C.O.
"Valentino Camouflage" (with Nimo)	2018	6	13	18	L.O.C.O.
"Diablo"	2019	13	23	41	Non-album single
"Ya Salame" (with Samra)	2019	5	5	8	Millies
"Millies"	2019	19	20	27	Millies
"La Haine"	2019	4	4	4	Millies
"Im Plus"	2019	12	12	23	Millies
"Im Film"	2019	12	15	17	Millies
"Yeah"	2019	3	8	7	Millies
"Fendi Drip" (featuring Ufo361 and Lil Baby)	2019	6	7	10	Millies
"Himmel grau" (with The Cratez and Kontra K)	2019	11	19	30	Nonstop
"Mios mit Bars"	2020	2	4	4	Exot
"Sip"	2020	3	5	13	Exot
"Trippin'"	2020	8	11	20	Exot
"Late Night"	2020	7	12	17	Exot
"Maison"	2020	9	12	23	Exot
"XXL" (with Miksu, Macloud and Summer Cem featuring Jamule	2020	2	2	3	Non-album single
"Nacht zu kurz"	2020	5	8	12	Exot
"Never Know" (featuring Shirin David)	2020	3	4	7	Exot
"Aqua"	2020	18	43	47	Aqua
"Shawty"	2020	7	22	10	Aqua
"Suicide Doors"	2021	12	15	20	Aqua
"Nicht wach"	2021	19	24	28	Aqua
"Peppermint"	2021	3	4	4	Aqua
"Melodien" (with Undacava)	2021	60	—	—	Non-album single
"Kids from the Block"	2021	3	6	4	Aqua
"Elmas" (featuring Lil Zey)	2021	5	15	10	Aqua
"Drilla"	2021	8	14	18	Aqua
"Schmetterling"	2021	3	7	4	Aqua
"Sweet Dreams"	2022	24	41	24	Majestic
"Majestic"	2022	6	18	10	Majestic
"Beautiful Girl"	2022	1	1	1	Majestic
"Push It"	2022	17	28	29	Majestic
"Frozen Tears"	2022	8	12	13	Majestic
"Präsi Suite"	2022	30	58	48	Non-album single
"Bamba" (with Aitch featuring Bia)	2022	1	1	1	Majestic
"West Connect" (with Central Cee)	2022	7	6	4	Majestic
"Wonderful Life" (with 6PM Records, Hurts and Sira)	2023	1	2	1	Non-album singles
"Time"	2024	1	1	1	Non-album singles
"Baddies" (with Aitch)	2024	6	7	5	Non-album singles
"Starboy" (with Jazeek)	2024	2	6	6	Non-album singles

==== As featured artist ====
Title	Year	Peak chart positions			Album
Title	Year	GER	AUT	SWI	Album
"Tresi" (Kalim featuring Luciano)	2017	93	—	—	Thronfolger
"Yakuza" (Veysel featuring Luciano)	2017	31	—	—	Hitman
"Roli Glitzer Glitzer" (Capital Bra featuring Luciano and Eno)	2018	1	4	7	Allein
"Durch die City" (Kalim featuring Luciano and Azzi Memo)	2018	57	—	—	Non-album single
"Kilo" (Kalim featuring Luciano)	2019	35	—	—	Null auf Hundert
"Pilot" (Eno featuring Luciano)	2019	91	—	—	Fuchs
"Gib Gas" (Ufo361 featuring Luciano)	2019	7	8	18	Wave
"Royal Rumble" (Kalazh44, Capital Bra and Samra featuring Nimo and Luciano)	2019	1	3	4	Non-album single
"Energie" (Sido featuring Luciano)	2019	10	11	22	Ich & keine Maske
"Summer Cem" (Summer Cem featuring Luciano)	2019	6	6	6	Nur noch nice
"Athen" (Jamule featuring Luciano)	2019	21	37	48	LSD
"Star" (Nimo featuring Luciano)	2019	36	—	79	Nimoriginal
"Valla nein!" (KC Rebell and Summer Cem featuring Luciano)	2020	2	3	7	Maximum III
"Bad" (Reezy featuring Luciano)	2020	32	55	67	Weisswein & Heartbreaks
"Devam" (Gentleman featuring Luciano and Ezhel)	2020	9	27	48	Blaue Stunde
"Birkin Bag" (DJ Jeezy featuring Luciano, Reezy & Kalim)	2021	31	50	79	Non-album single
"Wings" (Ufo361 featuring Luciano)	2021	—	—	—	Stay High
"Bad Eyez" (Nimo featuring Luciano)	2021	5	11	13	Moonboy
"2CB" (RAF Camora featuring Luciano)	2021	1	1	2	Zukunft II
"All Night" (RAF Camora featuring Luciano)	2023	1	1	1	Non-album singles
"Orange" (Sfera Ebbasta featuring Luciano)	2023	11	8	7	Non-album singles

=== Other charted songs ===
Title	Year	Peak chart positions			Album
Title	Year	GER	AUT	SWI	Album
"Eiskalt"	2017	44	—	54	Eiskalt
"Jeden Tag"	2017	51	—	72	Eiskalt
"Die Straße ein Teil"	2017	54	—	—	Eiskalt
"Geh meinen Weg"	2017	80	—	—	Eiskalt
"Berlin Favela"	2017	89	—	—	Eiskalt
"Loco Soldato"	2017	100	—	72	Eiskalt
"Guap Gang" (feat. Capital Bra)	2018	15	26	28	L.O.C.O.
"Traube Minze"	2018	36	—	—	L.O.C.O.
"Gestern"	2018	42	—	—	L.O.C.O.
"Money" (feat. Fredo)	2018	51	—	—	L.O.C.O.
"Locodinho" (feat. Eno)	2018	54	—	—	L.O.C.O.
"Champion"	2018	58	—	—	L.O.C.O.
"Hayate"	2018	45	—	—	L.O.C.O.
"Maktub"	2018	80	—	—	L.O.C.O.
"Intro"	2018	83	—	—	L.O.C.O.
"Sie will"	2018	91	—	—	L.O.C.O.
"Jean Paul Gaultier"	2019	—	31	24	Millies
"Star"	2019	36	—	71	Nimoriginal
"Halb 3" (featuring Macloud)	2020	21	37	56	Exot
"Frozen"	2020	—	44	53	Exot

== Awards and nominations ==
=== Results ===
Year	Award	Nomination	Work	Result	Ref.
2018	HipHop.de Awards	Best Rap-Solo-Act National	Himself	Nominated	
2019	MTV Europe Music Awards	Best German Act	Himself	Nominated	
2019	Hype Awards	Best Instagram Account	Himself	Won	
2019	Hype Awards	Best Male Artist	Himself	Nominated	
2019	HipHop.de Awards	Best Album National	Millies	Nominated	
2019	HipHop.de Awards	Best Song National	Fendi Drip (with Ufo361, Lil Baby)	Nominated	
2019	HipHop.de Awards	Best Video National	Royal Rumble (with Kalazh44, Capital Bra, Nimo, Samra)	Nominated	
2019	HipHop.de Awards	Best Rap-Solo-Act National	Himself	Nominated	
2020	Bravo Otto Awards	Hip-Hop National	Himself	Nominated	
2020	HipHop.de Awards	Best Rap-Solo-Act National	Himself	Nominated	
2020	HipHop.de Awards	Best Album National	Exot	Nominated	
2020	HipHop.de Awards	Best Song National	Valla nein (with Summer Cem, KC Rebell)	Nominated	
2020	HipHop.de Awards	Best Song National	Mios mit Bars	Nominated	
2021	HipHop.de Awards	Best Album National	Aqua	Nominated	
2021	HipHop.de Awards	Best Song National	Elmas (with Lil Zey)	Nominated	
2021	HipHop.de Awards	Best Video National	Bad Eyez (with Nimo)	Nominated	
2021	HipHop.de Awards	Best Video National	Peppermint	Nominated	
2021	HipHop.de Awards	Beat of the Year	Bad Eyez (with Nimo)	Nominated	
2021	HipHop.de Awards	Best Rap-Solo-Act National	Himself	Nominated	
2022	HipHop.de Awards	Best Album National	Majestic	Nominated	
2022	HipHop.de Awards	Best Song National	Bamba (with BIA, Aitch)	Won	
2022	HipHop.de Awards	Best Video National	Bamba (with BIA, Aitch)	Nominated	
2022	HipHop.de Awards	Best Live-Act National	Himself	Nominated	
2022	HipHop.de Awards	Beat of the Year	SUVs (prod. by Geenaro, Ghana Beats)	Won	
2022	HipHop.de Awards	Artist of the Year National	Himself	Nominated	
2022	HipHop.de Awards	Best Solo-Act National	Himself	Won	
2023	Swiss Music Awards	Best Solo Act International	Himself	Nominated	
2023	MTV Europe Music Awards	Best German Act	Himself	Nominated	
