= Samra (rapper) =

German rapper (born 1995)

- Also known as: Samra45
- Born: Hussein Akkouche; 15 January 1995 (age 31); Berlin, Germany
- Genres: Gangsta rap; hip-hop
- Occupation: Rapper
- Years active: 2016–present

Hussein Akkouche (born 15 January 1995), known professionally as Samra, is a Lebanese-German rapper based in Berlin. In November 2018, he had his first solo number-one in Germany with "Cataleya". In January 2019, Samra was named the winner of the Hiphop.de Award in the Best National Newcomer category.

== Career ==
Samra (then known as Samra45) first attracted attention on the German rap scene in the autumn of 2016 as a guest performer on Alpa Gun's album Zurück zur Straße – particularly on "Chaos", where he criticized 187 Strassenbande. Later that year, he was featured on Mert's "U21". Samra was reportedly approached in 2017 by Farid Bang, who was interested in signing the rapper to his Banger Musik label, but Samra refused. That year, Bushido signed Samra to his EGJ label.

In April 2018, Samra released his first track in a year. The single, "Rohdiamant", had 6.6 million streams in its first week and debuted at number 26 in Germany. It was the first time Samra entered the German charts. In July, he reached number one as a featured artist on Bushido's "Für euch alle".

Three months later, Samra was arrested in Prague after a police report of four armed men in a hotel; he and his crew were filming a music video. Among weapons seized by the police were pistols, a machete, an RGD-5 hand grenade and an RPG-75 anti-tank rocket launcher; when they were discovered to be deactivated (rendered incapable of firing), they were returned.

In November 2018, at age 23, Samra had his first solo number one in Germany with "Cataleya" (produced by Bushido). In January 2019, he received the Hiphop.de Best National Newcomer award.

That month, Samra reportedly left Bushido's label. In March, he and Capital Bra reached number one in Germany with "Wir ticken". Samra's EP, Travolta, was released as part of Capital Bra's CB6 premium box set on 26 April. The following month, "Wieder Lila" was Samra and Capital Bra's second number-one single in Germany.

== Stage name ==
According to laut.de, the rapper's choice of stage name is unusual; Samra (سمرة) is taken from the Lebanese phrase (ابو سمرة) which means "the person with brunette features".

== Discography ==
=== Studio albums ===
Title	Album details	Peak chart positions		
Title	Album details	GER	AUT	SWI
Jibrail und Iblis	Released: 17 April 2020; Label: Urban, Universal; Formats: CD, digital download, streaming, box set	1	1	1
Rohdiamant	Released: 23 April 2021; Label: Urban, Universal; Formats: CD, digital download, streaming, box set	3	1	2

=== Collaborative albums ===
Title	Album details	Peak chart positions			Certifications
Title	Album details	GER	AUT	SWI	Certifications
Berlin lebt 2 (with Capital Bra)	Released: 4 October 2019; Label: Bra Music, Urban; Formats: CD, digital download, streaming, box set	1	1	1	BVMI: Gold

=== Singles ===
==== As lead artist ====
Title	Year	Peak chart positions			Certifications	Album
Title	Year	GER	AUT	SWI	Certifications	Album
"Lila"	2016	—	—	—	none	Non-album singles
"Die Eins" (featuring Anonym)	2017	—	—	—	none	Non-album singles
"Criminal"	2017	—	—	—	none	Non-album singles
"Rohdiamant"	2018	26	37	37	none	Rohdiamant
"Roadrunner"	2018	42	53	39	none	Rohdiamant
"Cataleya"	2018	1	2	3	BVMI: Gold	Rohdiamant
"Wir ticken" (with Capital Bra)	2019	1	1	1	BVMI: Gold	CB6
"Ya Salame" (with Luciano)	2019	5	5	8	IFPI SWI: Platinum	Millies
"Harami"	2019	1	1	1	BVMI: Gold	Travolta
"Shoote ma Shoote"	2019	14	13	15	none	Travolta
"Ghetto" (featuring Capital Bra, Brudi030 and Kalazh44)	2019	9	17	15	none	Non-album singles
"Wieder Lila" (with Capital Bra)	2019	1	1	2	BVMI: Platinum	Non-album singles
"Marlboro Rot"	2019	5	5	7	BVMI: Gold	Non-album singles
"Royal Rumble" (with Kalazh44 and Capital Bra featuring Nimo and Luciano)	2019	1	3	4	none	Non-album singles
"Tilidin" (with Capital Bra)	2019	1	1	1	BVMI: 3× Gold; IFPI AUT: 2× Platinum	Berlin lebt 2
"Zombie" (with Capital Bra)	2019	1	2	6	BVMI: Gold	Berlin lebt 2
"Nummer 1" (with Capital Bra)	2019	1	1	2	none	Berlin lebt 2
"High" (with Sido and Kool Savas)	2019	16	22	18	none	Ich und keine Maske
"Huracan" (with Capital Bra)	2019	3	2	3	BVMI: Gold	Berlin lebt 2
"110" (with Capital Bra and LEA)	2019	1	2	2	BVMI: 3× Gold; IFPI AUT: Gold	Berlin lebt 2
"Berlin lebt wie nie zuvor" (with Capital Bra)	2019	5	5	5	none	Berlin lebt 2
"Colt"	2019	2	3	2	BVMI: Gold	Jibrail & Iblis
"95 BPM"	2019	16	46	23	none	Jibrail & Iblis
"Zu Ende" (with Elif)	2020	4	3	8	BVMI: Gold; IFPI AUT: Gold	Jibrail & Iblis
"Mon ami"	2020	3	3	4	IFPI AUT: Gold	Jibrail & Iblis
"Weiss"	2020	3	4	4	BVMI: Gold; IFPI AUT: Gold	Jibrail & Iblis
"Schüsse im Regen"	2020	3	5	6	none	Jibrail & Iblis
"100k Cash" (with Capital Bra)	2020	3	2	3	none	CB7
"6 Uhr"	2020	6	7	11	none	Jibrail & Iblis
"Berlin" (with Capital Bra)	2020	2	2	3	none	Jibrail & Iblis
"BaeBae"	2020	2	5	5	BVMI: Gold	Jibrail & Iblis
"365 Tage" (with Capital Bra)	2020	4	4	7	none	Jibrail & Iblis
"45" (with Jalil)	2020	37	66	68	none	Reset
"Miskin"	2020	10	14	23	none	Non-album singles
"24 Stunden"	2020	4	13	16	none	Non-album singles
"Lebst du noch"	2020	9	27	33	none	Non-album singles
"Rohdiamant II"	2020	1	3	4	none	Rohdiamant
"Kennst du das ?!"	2020	1	8	9	none	Rohdiamant
"Lost" (with Topic42)	2020	3	7	8	BVMI: Gold	Rohdiamant
"Goldjunge"	2021	27	—	48	none	Rohdiamant
"Lila" (with Kida)	2021	—	31	12	none	Non-album singles
"Ich bin weg (Boro Boro)" (with Topic42 featuring Arash)	2021	9	16	12	none	Non-album singles
"SMS"	2021	6	15	18	none	Rohdiamant
"Augen überall" (feat. Ano)	2021	15	35	39	none	Rohdiamant
"Diebe"	2021	13	24	38	none	Rohdiamant
"Paradies" (feat. Bojan)	2021	12	30	20	none	Non-album singles
"Canada Goose"	2021	21	40	37	none	Non-album singles
"Schockstarre"	2021	18	59	23	none	Non-album singles
"—" denotes a recording that did not chart or was not released in that territory.

==== As featured artist ====
Title	Year	Peak chart positions			Certifications	Album
Title	Year	GER	AUT	SWI	Certifications	Album
"Hades" (Bushido featuring Samra)	2018	8	9	8	none	Mythos
"Für euch alle" (Bushido featuring Samra and Capital Bra)	2018	1	1	2	BVMI: Gold	Mythos
"Fightclub" (Capital Bra featuring Samra and AK Ausserkontrolle)	2018	3	5	9	none	Allein
"Click Click" (Capital Bra featuring Samra)	2019	22	—	—	none	CB6
"Paris" (Anonym featuring Samra)	2020	42	—	100	none	Non-album singles
"Shakira" (Kalazh44 featuring Samra)	2020	10	13	18		Non-album singles
"Unbekannt" (Bozza featuring Samra)	2020	8	17	18		Non-album singles
"Tiefschwarz" (Kontra K featuring Samra)	2020	2	4	5		Non-album singles
"Al Qu Damm" (Bozza featuring Samra)	2020	24	48	55		Non-album singles
"Augen zu" (Elif featuring Samra)	2020	9	28	40	none	Nacht
"Gestern nix heute Star" (Play69 featuring Samra)	2020	23	—	55	none	Non-album single

=== Other charted songs ===
Title	Year	Peak chart positions			Album
Title	Year	GER	AUT	SWI	Album
"Mosaik"	2019	43	50	61	Travolta EP
"Lambo Gallardo"	2019	90	—	—	Travolta EP
"Purple Rain" (with Capital Bra and Santos)	2019	50	—	—	Berlin lebt 2
"Lieber Gott" (with Capital Bra)	2019	62	—	—	Berlin lebt 2
"So alleine" (with Capital Bra)	2019	87	—	—	Berlin lebt 2
"Tief in die Nacht"	2020	—	35	37	Jibrail und Iblis
"Guerilla" (Farid Bang featuring Samra and Capital Bra)	2020	—	—	50	Genkidama

== Awards and nominations ==
Year	Award	Nomination	Work	Result	Ref.
2018	HipHop.de Awards	Best Newcomer National	Himself	Won	
2019	HipHop.de Awards	Best Song National	Wieder Lila (with Capital Bra)	Nominated	
2019	HipHop.de Awards	Best Video National	Royal Rumble (with Luciano, Kalazh44, Capital Bra, Nimo)	Nominated	
2019	HipHop.de Awards	Best Group National	Himself (with Capital Bra)	Won	
2019	1LIVE Krone Awards	Best Single	110 (Capital Bra & Samra feat. LEA)	Nominated	
2019	1LIVE Krone Awards	Best Hip-Hop Act	Himself (with Capital Bra)	Nominated	
2019	Hype Awards	Newcomer	Himself	Won	
2020	Swiss Music Awards	Best Group International	Himself (with Capital Bra)	Nominated	
2020	Bravo Otto Awards	Hip-Hop National	Himself	Nominated	
2020	HipHop.de Awards	Best Song National	Tiefschwarz (with Kontra K)	Nominated	
2020	HipHop.de Awards	Best Rap-Solo-Act National	Himself	Nominated	
2021	Swiss Music Awards	Best Solo Act International	Himself	Nominated	
2021	Swiss Music Awards	Best Breaking Act International	Himself	Nominated	

== Tours ==
=== Cancelled ===
- 2020: Berlin Lebt 2 Arena Tour (with Capital Bra)
- 2021: Capital Bra x Samra Tour (with Capital Bra)
- 2021: Jibrail & Iblis Tour
