= Neymar (song) =

Single by Capital Bra featuring Ufo361

from the album Berlin lebt
- Language: German
- Released: 27 April 2018
- Length: 4:23
- Label: Team Kuku; Sony Music
- Songwriters: Capital Bra; Ufo361
- Producers: Young Taylor; The Cratez

Capital Bra singles chronology
| "5 Songs in einer Nacht" (2018) | "Neymar" (2018) | "Sturmmaske auf (remix)" (2018) |

Ufo361 singles chronology
| "Ohne mich" (2018) | "Neymar" (2018) | "Acker jeden Tag" (2018) |

"Neymar" is a song by German rapper Capital Bra for his fourth studio album Berlin lebt (2018), featuring German rapper Ufo361. The single was made available for digital download and streaming on 27 April 2018, through Team Kuku and Sony Music. "Neymar" was written by Capital Bra and Ufo361, while production was handled by Young Taylor and The Cratez.

== Background, composition and music video ==
"gogo" was released as the second single of Capital Bra's fourth studio album Berlin lebt (2018). The song was written by him and Ufuk Bayraktar, while production was handled by Young Taylor and The Cratez. The music video was directed by Fitem Rustimi of Fati.TV, who previously shot "5 Songs in einer Nacht".

== Commercial performance ==
"Neymar" debuted atop the German charts on 4 May 2018 and became Capital Bra's second song to do so. The song was streamed over seven million times in Germany in its first week of release, making it—at the time—the most-streamed German-speaking song of all time in its release week. He also became the first German artist to reach number one with two consecutive released singles and marked Ufo361's first number-one single. Elsewhere, the song reached number one on the Austrian charts, making it Capital Bra's and Ufo361's first number one single in Austria. The single topped the German single charts for three consecutive weeks, making it Capital Bra's best chart performance.

== Charts ==
=== Weekly charts ===
| Chart (2018) | Peak position |
|---|---|
| Austria (Ö3 Austria Top 40) | 1 |
| Germany (GfK) | 1 |
| Switzerland (Schweizer Hitparade) | 3 |

=== Year-end charts ===
| Chart (2018) | Position |
|---|---|
| Austria (Ö3 Austria Top 40) | 10 |
| Germany (Official German Charts) | 15 |
| Switzerland (Schweizer Hitparade) | 56 |

== Certifications ==
| Region | Certification | Certified units/sales |
|---|---|---|
| Germany (BVMI) | Platinum | 400,000^{‡} |
^{‡} Sales+streaming figures based on certification alone.
