= Berlin lebt =

Studio album by Capital Bra
- Released: 22 June 2018
- Genre: Rap
- Length: 2:02:52
- Language: German
- Label: Team Kuku; Sony Music
- Producer: David Kraft (exec.); Young Taylor; Tim Wilke (exec.); Freek Van Workum

Capital Bra chronology
Blyat (2017)	Berlin lebt (2018)	Allein (2018)

Singles from Berlin lebt
- 1. "5 Songs in einer Nacht" Released: 6 April 2018; 2. "Neymar" Released: 27 April 2018; 3. "One Night Stand" Released: 25 May 2018; 4. "Berlin lebt" Released: 7 June 2018

Berlin lebt (German pronunciation: [bɛʁˈliːn ˈleːpt], "Berlin is alive") is the fourth studio album by German rapper Capital Bra. The triple album, consisting of the standard version, instrumentals and the EP 5 Songs in einer Nacht was released on 22 June 2018, by Team Kuku and distributed by Sony Music. The album features guest appearances by Ufo361, Farid Bang, KC Rebell, Bausa and AK Ausserkontrolle among others.

The album produced four singles, including "5 Songs in einer Nacht", "Neymar", "One Night Stand" and "Berlin lebt", all of which reached number one in Germany. Every single was supported by a music video, shot by Fati.TV The album debuted at number one in Germany.

== Background and singles ==
Capital Bra announced the album on 26 March 2018, through a teaser which features him performing in front of the Brandenburg Gate in Berlin. The first single of the album, "5 Songs of einer Nacht" was released on 6 April 2018. The single became Balovatsky's first single to top the German single charts on 13 April 2018. The second single "Neymar" featuring Ufo361 was released three weeks later. The track again topped the charts in Germany and in Austria. It also broke the record for the most streamed German song within a week. "One Night Stand" and "Berlin lebt" were released in May and June, respectively. Both reached the top on the German and Austrian single charts.

== Track listing ==
Credits adapted from Tidal.

No.	Title	Writer(s)	Producer(s)	Length
1.	"Berlin lebt"	Vladislav Balovatsky	Tim Wilke; David Kraft	3:04
2.	"Kennzeichen B-TK" (featuring King Khalil)	Balovtsky; Kalil Aubeidy	Wilke; Kraft	2:40
3.	"Giselle Bündchen"	Balovtsky	Wilke; Kraft	3:24
4.	"Neymar" (featuring Ufo361)	Balovtsky; Ufuk Bayraktar	Wilke; Kraft; Young Taylor	4:23
5.	"5 Songs in einer Nacht"	Balovtsky	Wilke; Kraft	2:27
6.	"Gutes Herz" (featuring KC Rebell)	Balovtsky	Wilke; Kraft	3:12
7.	"Panzer, Tiger" (featuring Farid Bang)	Balovtsky; Farid Hamed El Abdellaoui	Wilke; Kraft	2:44
8.	"Ballert"	Balovtsky	Wilke; Kraft	2:52
9.	"Baba Flow"	Balovtsky	Wilke; Kraft	3:05
10.	"Darby" (featuring AK Ausserkontrolle)	Balovtsky; Davut Altundal	Wilke; Kraft; Freek Van Workum	3:21
11.	"One Night Stand"	Balovtsky	Wilke; Kraft	2:42
12.	"Packen"	Balovtsky	Wilke; Kraft	3:54
13.	"Glaub mir"	Balovtsky	Wilke; Kraft	3:03
14.	"Meine Welt" (featuring King Khalil)	Balovtsky; Kalil Aubeidy	Wilke; Kraft	2:42
15.	"Wann dann" (featuring Capital T)	Balovtsky; Capital T	BO Beatz	3:09
Total length:				46:42

Teil 2
No.	Title	Writer(s)	Producer(s)	Length
1.	"Berlin lebt (Instrumental)"	Vladislav Balovatsky	Tim Wilke; David Kraft	3:03
2.	"Kennzeichen B-TK (Instrumental)" (featuring King Khalil)	Balovtsky; Kalil Aubeidy	Wilke; Kraft	2:40
3.	"Giselle Bündchen (Instrumental)"	Balovtsky	Wilke; Kraft	3:24
4.	"Neymar (Instrumental)" (featuring Ufo361)	Balovtsky; Ufuk Bayraktar	Wilke; Kraft; Young Taylor	4:23
5.	"5 Songs in einer Nacht (Instrumental)"	Balovtsky	Wilke; Kraft	2:27
6.	"Gutes Herz (Instrumental)" (featuring KC Rebell)	Balovtsky	Wilke; Kraft	3:12
7.	"Panzer, Tiger (Instrumental)" (featuring Farid Bang)	Balovtsky; Farid Hamed El Abdellaoui	Wilke; Kraft	2:44
8.	"Ballert (Instrumental)"	Balovtsky	Wilke; Kraft	2:52
9.	"Baba Flow (Instrumental)"	Balovtsky	Wilke; Kraft	2:55
10.	"Darby (Instrumental)" (featuring AK Ausserkontrolle)	Balovtsky; Davut Altundal	Wilke; Kraft; Freek Van Workum	3:21
11.	"One Night Stand (Instrumental)"	Balovtsky	Wilke; Kraft	2:40
12.	"Packen (Instrumental)"	Balovtsky	Wilke; Kraft	3:54
13.	"Glaub mir (Instrumental)"	Balovtsky	Wilke; Kraft	3:03
14.	"Meine Welt (Instrumental)" (featuring King Khalil)	Balovtsky; Kalil Aubeidy	Wilke; Kraft	2:42
15.	"Wann dann (Instrumental)" (featuring Capital T)	Balovtsky	BO Beatz	3:09
Total length:				1:33:11

5 Songs in einer Nacht EP
No.	Title	Writer(s)	Producer(s)	Length
1.	"Rolli von Pablo" (featuring Kay Ay)	Vladislav Balovatsky	Tim Wilke; David Kraft	2:42
2.	"Anders als die" (featuring Bausa)	Balovtsky; Julian Otto	Wilke; Kraft	3:33
3.	"Ja Bra 2"	Balovtsky	Wilke; Kraft	2:13
4.	"Dealer" (featuring Joshi Mizu)	Balovtsky; Josef Valenzuela	Wilke; Kraft	2:58
5.	"Was wollen die"	Balovtsky	Wilke; Kraft	3:14
6.	"Rolli von Pablo (Instrumental)" (featuring Kay Ay)	Balovatsky	Wilke; Kraft	2:42
7.	"Anders als die (Instrumental)" (featuring Bausa)	Balovtsky; Julian Otto	Wilke; Kraft	3:33
8.	"Ja Bra 2 (Instrumental)"	Balovtsky	Wilke; Kraft	2:13
9.	"Dealer (Instrumental)" (featuring Joshi Mizu)	Balovtsky; Josef Valenzuela	Wilke; Kraft	2:58
10.	"Was wollen die (Instrumental)"	Balovtsky	Wilke; Kraft	3:14
Total length:				2:02:52

== Charts ==
=== Weekly charts ===
Chart (2018)	Peak position
Austrian Albums (Ö3 Austria)	1
German Albums (Offizielle Top 100)	1
Swiss Albums (Schweizer Hitparade)	1

=== Year-end charts ===
Chart (2018)	Position
Austrian Albums (Ö3 Austria)	9
German Albums (Offizielle Top 100)	13
Swiss Albums (Schweizer Hitparade)	31

== Certifications ==
Region	Certification	Certified units/sales
Germany (BVMI)	Gold	100,000^{‡}
^{‡} Sales+streaming figures based on certification alone.

== Release history ==
Region	Date	Format(s)	Label	Ref.
Germany	22 June 2018	Streaming; digital download	Team Kuku; Sony Music	
Germany	22 June 2018	CD; box set	Team Kuku; Sony Music	
