= Blyat (album) =

Studio album by Capital Bra
- Released: 29 September 2017
- Recorded: 2017
- Length: 46:10
- Label: Auf!Keinen!Fall!
- Producer: David Kraft; Tim Wilke; Goldfinger Beatz; Hoodboyz; Saven Musiq

Capital Bra chronology
Ibrakadabra (2017)	Blyat (2017)	Berlin lebt (2018)

Singles from Blyat
- 1. "Nur noch Gucci" Released: 2 July 2017; 2. "Ghetto Massari" Released: 29 July 2017; 3. "Olé olé" Released: 18 August 2017; 4. "Kuku Sls" Released: 3 September 2017; 5. "Wer hoch fliegt fällt tief" Released: 29 September 2017; 6. "Zweistellige Haftstrafen" Released: 22 October 2017

Blyat is the third studio album by German rapper Capital Bra, released on 29 September 2017 via Auf!Keinen!Fall!.

The album produced six singles, including "Nur noch Gucci", "Ghetto Massari", "Olé olé", "Kuku Sls", "Wer hoch fliegt fällt tief" and "Zweistellige Haftstrafen" of which five received music videos. Capital Bra promoted the album with a limited box set. Blyat debuted on number three in Germany, Austria and five in Switzerland.

== Background ==
Capital Bra released his second studio album Makarov Complex in February 2017 to commercial success. On 16 June 2017, he announced his second studio album Blyat. The first single, "Nur noch Gucci", was released in July.

== Release and promotion ==
Blyat was released by Auf!Keinen!Fall!, Chapter One, and Universal. Internationally, the album was released on 29 September 2017 on all major streaming platforms and physically in Germany, Austria, and Switzerland.

To promote the album, German rappers Kollegah and Farid Bang announced a limited box set that included the CD, an EP, a DVD, a T-shirt, a poster, three stickers, and a Matryoshka doll.

== Track listing ==
Blyat
No.	Title	Writer(s)	Length
1.	"Intro (Blyat)"	Capital Bra	1:32
2.	"Wie alles begann"	Capital Bra	3:07
3.	"Paff Paff weiter 2" (featuring Gzuz)	Capital Bra; Gzuz	3:56
4.	"Richtung Para" (featuring Sido)	Capital Bra; Sido	2:38
5.	"Nur noch Gucci"	Capital Bra	3:32
6.	"Wer hoch fliegt fällt tief"	Capital Bra	2:45
7.	"Na Na Na" (featuring Ufo 361)	Capital Bra; Ufo 361	3:05
8.	"Das Leben ist so" (featuring Olexesh)	Capital Bra; Olexesh	3:59
9.	"Ghetto Massari"	Capital Bra	2:57
10.	"Zweistellige Haftstrafen" (featuring King Khalil)	Capital Bra; King Khalil	2:54
11.	"Kuku SLS" (featuring Gringo44)	Capital Bra; Gringo44	4:29
12.	"BMW Alpina"	Capital Bra	3:12
13.	"Bra macht die AK" (featuring AK Ausserkontrolle)	Capital Bra	2:44
14.	"Mademoiselle"	Capital Bra	2:48
15.	"Olé Olé" (featuring Joshi Mizu and RAF Camora)	Capital Bra; Joshi Mizu; RAF Camora	2:32
Total length:			46:10

== Charts ==
Chart (2017)	Peak position
Austrian Albums (Ö3 Austria)	3
German Albums (Offizielle Top 100)	3
Swiss Albums (Schweizer Hitparade)	5

== Certifications ==
Region	Certification	Certified units/sales
Germany (BVMI)	Gold	100,000^{‡}
^{‡} Sales+streaming figures based on certification alone.
