= Ibrakadabra =

EP by Capital Bra
- Released: 9 May 2017
- Language: German
- Label: Team Kuku; Chapter One; Auf!Keinen!Fall!
- Producer: Saven Musiq

Capital Bra chronology
Makarov Komplex (2017)	Ibrakadabra (2017)	Blyat (2017)

Ibrakadabra is the second extended play (EP) by German rapper Capital Bra, released digitally on 9 May 2017 through Team Kuku, Chapter One and Auf!Keinen!Fall!.

== Background ==
Capital Bra released his second studio album Makarov Komplex three months prior to Ibrakadabra. The EP was released without prior announcement on 9 May 2017.

== Commercial performance ==
The EP attained minor commercial success in Switzerland, where it debuted at No. 77. It left the chart the following week.

== Track listing ==
Ibrakadabra
No.	Title	Lyrics	Music	Length
1.	"Ja Braaa"	Vladislav Balovatsky	Saven Musiq	1:48
2.	"In der Stellung von Balotelli"	Balovatsky	Saven Musiq	2:34
3.	"Blei auf die Stirn" (featuring King Khalil)	Balovatsky	Saven Musiq	3:09
4.	"Es geht um Capital"	Balovatsky	Saven Musiq	2:28
5.	"Bratan ist OK"	Balovatsky	Saven Musiq	2:50

== Charts ==
Chart (2017)	Peak position
Swiss Albums (Schweizer Hitparade)	77
