= Kuku Bra =

Studio album by Capital Bra
- Released: 29 January 2016 (dig.)
- Recorded: March 2015 – 2016
- Genre: Gangsta rap
- Length: 54:00
- Language: German
- Label: Baba City, Chapter One, UMG
- Producer: Hijackers

Capital Bra chronology
Kuku Bra (2016)	Makarov Komplex (2017)

Singles from Kuku Bra
- 1. "Bra macht die Uzi" Released: 1 December 2015; 2. "Kuku Habibi" Released: 5 February 2016; 3. "Fluchtwagen glänzen" Released: 21 March 2016

Kuku Bra is the debut studio album by German rapper Capital Bra, at this time simply known as Capital. It was digitally released on 29 January 2016, through Baba City, Chapter One and distributed by the Universal Music Group. The album was promoted by four singles: "Bra macht die Uzi", "Kuku Habibi", "Fluchtwagen glänzen".

== Background and singles ==
Vladislav Balovatsky (Capital Bra) started his career through Rap on Wednesday (Rap am Mittwoch), a German battle rap tournament. Following his win against Master Marv in February 2015, he departed from the tournament and started working on the album. In December, he released his first single, not included on the album "Bra", and announced the album. The album was announced in December of the same year, through the single "Bra macht die Uzi". Three more singles have been released; including "Kuku Habibi", "Fluchtwagen glänzen" and "Kreide", all three alongside German rapper King Khalil.

== Track listing ==
Credits adapted from the booklet.

Kuku Bra
No.	Title	Lyrics	Music	Length
1.	"Intro"			2:28
2.	"Vladimir Putin"	Vladislav Balovatsky; MMinx; Bo Diggler; Produes	Hijackers	3:43
3.	"Du siehst"	Balovatsky; MMinx; Bo Diggler; Produes	Hijackers	3:21
4.	"Zu viel, zu wenig" (Olexesh)	Balovatsky; MMinx; Bo Diggler; Produes	Hijackers	4:25
5.	"Falsche Gesichter"	Balovatsky; MMinx; Bo Diggler; Produes	Hijackers	4:35
6.	"Braun, gelb, lila"	Balovatsky; MMinx; Bo Diggler; Produes	Hijackers	2:31
7.	"Kuku Habibi" (featuring King Khalil)	Balovatsky; MMinx; Bo Diggler; Produes	Hijackers	3:16
8.	"Bra macht die Uzi"	Balovatsky; MMinx; Bo Diggler; Produes	Hijackers	4:02
9.	"Bra hinter dir"	Balovatsky; MMinx; Bo Diggler; Produes	Hijackers	3:24
10.	"Akhis aus Kosovo"	Balovatsky; MMinx; Bo Diggler; Produes	Hijackers	3:06
11.	"Bruda" (featuring Massiv & Kay Ay)	Balovatsky; MMinx; Bo Diggler; Produes	Hijackers	3:54
12.	"Pic"	Balovatsky; MMinx; Bo Diggler; Produes	Hijackers	2:18
13.	"Fluchtwagen glänzen" (featuring King Khalil)	Balovatsky; MMinx; Bo Diggler; Produes	Hijackers	3:31
14.	"Wir sind stabil"	Balovatsky; MMinx; Bo Diggler; Produes	Hijackers	3:14
15.	"Verrückte Leute"	Balovatsky; MMinx; Bo Diggler; Produes	Hijackers	2:57
16.	"Alles kaputt"	Balovatsky; MMinx; Bo Diggler; Produes	Hijackers	3:41

== Charts ==
Chart (2016)	Peak position
Austrian Albums (Ö3 Austria)	61
German Albums (Offizielle Top 100)	32
German Hip Hop Albums (Top 20 Hip Hop)	4

== Release history ==
Region	Date	Format(s)	Label	Ref.
Various	29 January 2016	Digital download; streaming	Baba City; Chapter One; UMG	
Various	12 February 2016	CD, box set	Baba City; Chapter One; UMG	
