= CB6 (album) =

Studio album by Capital Bra
- Released: 12 April 2019
- Recorded: 2018–2019
- Language: German
- Label: Urban; Bra Music

Capital Bra chronology
Allein (2018)	CB6 (2019)	Berlin lebt 2 (2019)

Singles from CB6
- 1. "Benzema" Released: 21 December 2018; 2. "Prinzessa" Released: 25 January 2019; 3. "Capital Bra je m'appelle" Released: 22 February 2019; 4. "Wir ticken" Released: 15 March 2019; 5. "Rolex" Released: 12 April 2019

CB6 (short for Capital Bra 6) is the sixth studio album by German rapper Capital Bra, released on 12 April 2019 through Bra Music and Urban. The album reached number one in Austria and Germany, and earned a total of 1.4 billion streams in Germany, resulting in a new all-time record.

== Background and singles ==
Capital Bra released his fifth studio album, Allein, through Team Kuku on 2 November 2018. The album reached the top five in German-speaking Europe. The album was announced on 21 December 2018 through the release of the second single "Benzema". It became his eighth single to top the German charts in late December 2018. In January 2019, it was announced that he had signed with Universal Music Germany and had left ersguterjunge. The album was originally scheduled for release on 26 April, but was released digitally and for streaming on 12 April following a leak of the album.

== Track listing ==
Credits adapted from iTunes and Tidal.

No.	Title	Lyrics	Music	Length
1.	"Benzema"	Vladislav Balovatsky	Beatzarre; Djorkaeff	2:39
2.	"Rolex" (featuring Summer Cem and KC Rebell)
3.	"Bye Bye" (featuring Nimo)
4.	"Cabriolet"
5.	"Click Click"
6.	"Mexican Mafia"
7.	"Leg"
8.	"Steh auf"
9.	"Prinzessa"	Balovatsky	Beatzarre; Djorkaeff	2:58
10.	"Wir ticken" (with Samra)	Balovatsky; Hussein Akkouche	Beatzarre; Djorkaeff	3:23
11.	"Van der Vaart" (featuring Nash)
12.	"Schwarze Locken"
13.	"Capital Bra je m'appelle"	Balovatsky	Goldfinger; Lex Barkley	3:07
14.	"Kalt"
15.	"Schon ok"
16.	"Sollte so sein"
17.	"Blech"
18.	"Für uns"

== Charts ==
=== Weekly charts ===
Chart (2019)	Peak position
Austrian Albums (Ö3 Austria)	1
German Albums (Offizielle Top 100)	1
Swiss Albums (Schweizer Hitparade)	2

=== Year-end charts ===
Chart (2019)	Position
Austrian Albums (Ö3 Austria)	11
German Albums (Offizielle Top 100)	10
Swiss Albums (Schweizer Hitparade)	12
Chart (2020)	Position
Austrian Albums (Ö3 Austria)	58

== Certifications ==
Region	Certification	Certified units/sales
Germany (BVMI)	Gold	100,000^{‡}
^{‡} Sales+streaming figures based on certification alone.

== Release history ==
Region	Date	Format	Label	Ref.
Various	12 April 2019	Download; streaming	Bra Music; Urban	
Various	26 April 2019	Limited box set; CD	Bra Music; Urban	
