= Capital Bra =

Russian-born German rapper (born 1994)

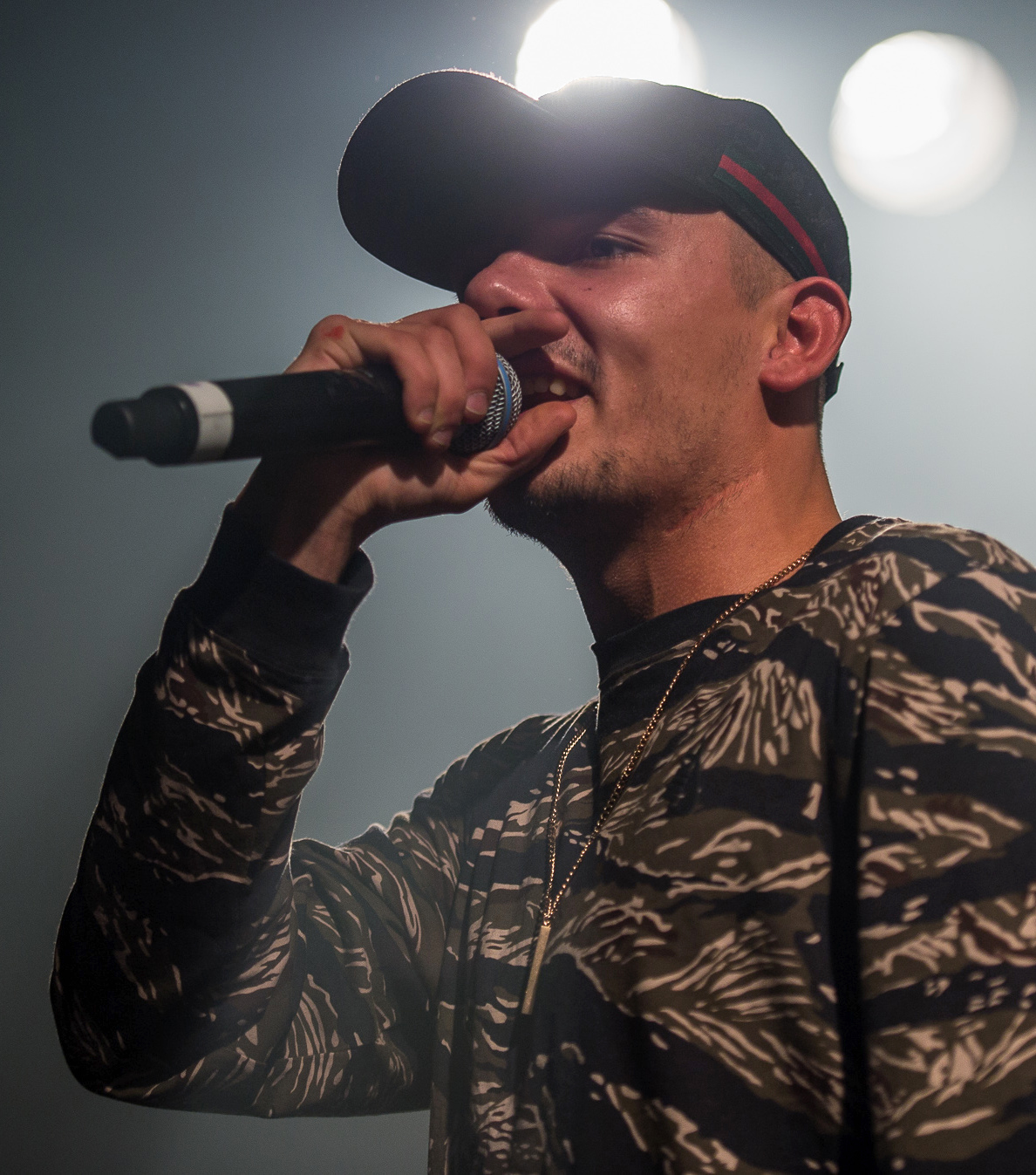
- Capital Bra performing in 2018
- Born: Vladislav Balovatsky; 23 November 1994 (age 31); Siberia, Russia
- Other names: Smia One; Capital; Capi; Bra; Joker Bra
- Occupations: Rapper; singer; songwriter; entrepreneur
- Years active: 2009–present
- Children: 4
- Musical career
- Genres: Gangsta rap; trap; pop rap; cloud rap
- Instrument: Vocals
- Labels: Urban; Bra Music; Former: Baba City; Auf!Keinen!Fall!; Team Kuku; Sony; ersguterjunge

Vladislav Balovatsky (Ukrainian: Владислав Баловацький; born 23 November 1994), known professionally as Capital Bra (German pronunciation: [kapiˈtaːl ˈbʁa]), is a German rapper.

Born in a small town in Siberia, Russia and raised in Dnipro, Ukraine, he and his mother moved to Berlin, Germany in the early 2000s. He started rapping at the age of 11 and participated at Rap am Mittwoch in 2014, a German battle rap tournament. Intent on pursuing a solo career as a rapper, Capital Bra released his first studio album Kuku Bra in January 2016 to minor commercial success in Germany. The follow-ups Makarov Complex and Blyat were released in February and September 2017 and peaked in the top 5 of German-speaking Europe. His fourth studio album, Berlin lebt (2018), peaked at number one in Germany, Austria and Switzerland and the follow-up Allein (2018), debuted at number two on the German album charts. Balovatsky is the most successful charting German act, with 22 number-one songs in Germany.

== Biography ==
=== 1994–2014: Early life and Rap am Mittwoch ===
Vladislav Balovatsky was born on 23 November 1994 in Siberia, Russia to Ukrainian parents, who worked in the petroleum industry. At a young age Balovatsky and his parents moved to Dnipro, Ukraine. Balovatsky's mother decided to move to Germany in 2001 to find a better life for her son. They settled in Alt-Hohenschönhausen, Berlin, where Balovatsky spent his youth. His father stayed in Ukraine. He played football for Berliner FC Dynamo. Under the pseudonym "Smia One", Balovatsky uploaded his first music video onto YouTube in 2009. He rose to prominence in German underground rap through Rap am Mittwoch, a German battle rap tournament where he participated in a number of battles. His last competition against Master Marv was the most-watched Rap am Mittwoch battle on YouTube, with more than 7.8 million views as of January 2019. Following his win, Balovatsky announced his departure from Rap am Mittwoch. In March, he released his first single "Bra".

=== 2015–2017: First three albums ===
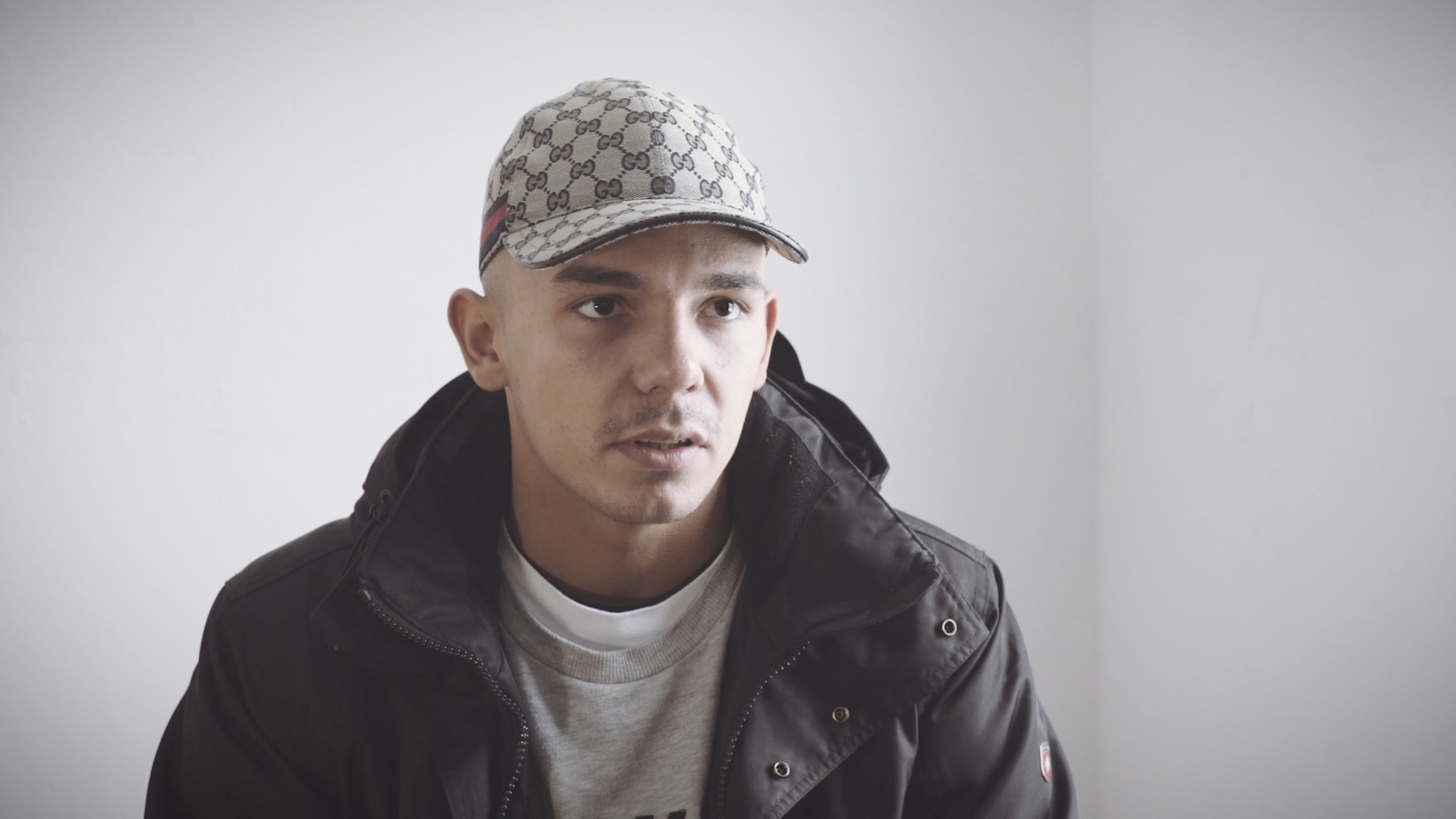
Balovatsky in an interview in early 2017

Balovatsky, at this time known as Capital, announced his first release Kuku Bra on 1 December 2015, through the single "Bra macht die Uzi". Three more singles have been released, including "Kuku Habibi", "Fluchtwagen glänzen" and "Kreide", all three alongside German rapper King Khalil. None of them entered the charts however and the album was released on 29 January 2016 through Baba City, Chapter One and distributed through Universal. The album debuted at No. 32 on the German album chart on issue dated 19 February 2016. and No. 61 on the Austrian album charts.

His second studio album was announced less than a year later in November 2016. The first single of the album, "Ala Ba Ba" featuring Ufo361 was released in mid December 2016. The second single "Es geht ums Geschäft", released in January 2017 and became his first song to enter the German single charts, reaching number 76. The following two singles "Geld machen" and "Die Echten" did not enter the charts. Makarov Komplex was released on 3 February 2017, through Auf!Keinen!Fall!, Chapter One and Team Kuku. The album debuted within the top five in German-speaking Europe. It reached the top of the charts on the Austrian album charts and the German hip-hop album charts.

Three months later, he released his unannounced second EP Ibrakadabra. It included five tracks, all produced by Saven Musiq and written by Balovatsky. Commercially, the EP charted at No. 77 in Switzerland. Balovatsky announced his third studio album Blyat on 16 June 2017, through Facebook. The album was supported by six singles, including "Nur noch Gucci" and "Olé olé", which became his first singles to be certified gold by the Bundesverband Musikindustrie in early 2018. The album was released on 29 September 2017, through Team Kuku and Auf!Keinen!Fall!. The album debuted within the top five in German-speaking Europe. It spent 50 weeks on the German, 25 on the Austrian and five on the Swiss album charts. In February and March 2018, he went on a 16-date German-speaking Europe tour, alongside King Khalil.

=== 2018: Mainstream success and split from Team Kuku ===
Balovatsky was featured on "Power", by German rapper Ufo361, which peaked at number seven in Germany. He announced Berlin lebt, his fourth studio album on 26 March 2018 with a teaser on YouTube. The teaser features Balovatsky performing in front of the Brandenburg Gate in Berlin. The first single of the album, "5 Songs in einer Nacht" was released on 6 April 2018. The single became Balovatsky's first single to top the German single charts on 13 April 2018. The three follow-up singles "Neymar", "One Night Stand" and "Berlin lebt", all topped the charts in Germany and Austria. Berlin lebt was released on 22 June 2018 and became Balovatsky's first album to top the charts in German-speaking Europe. A week prior, he split from his record label Team Kuku, citing differences in interest.

In early July, German rapper Bushido released "Für euch alle", alongside Balovatsky and fellow rapper Samra, confirming Balovatsky signing to Bushido's label ersguterjunge. In an interview, released in March 2019, he explained his decision: "Bushido wanted to do a song with me so we talked. Signing with him had little to do with himself, but with his team." He went on explaining that Samra was a decisive reason for his signing. In the end of July, Balovatsky teased "Melodien", a song with Juju from the rap duo SXTN. It was released in early August and became his first song to top the charts in Germany, Austria and Switzerland. The single also broke the record for most streams in one day and one week in Germany, accumulating more than 1.9 million and 9.7 million streams respectively.

The limited boxset of Bushido's thirteenth studio album Mythos included the Fickt euch alle EP ("Fuck You All EP") by Capital Bra, which was released on 28 September 2018. Balovatsky announced his fifth studio album, Allein, on 20 August 2018 on Instagram, which was made available for digital download and streaming on 2 November 2018, as his last release through Team Kuku. The album debuted at number two on 9 November 2018.

In early November, Balovatsky created his own YouTube channel, where he began regularly uploading freetracks. Since February 2019, the channel is also used for all of his and Samra's singles. Apple Music and Spotify ranked Berlin lebt as the most-streamed album in Germany for 2018. Five of his music videos, released in 2018, ranked in the top ten of the most-viewed videos in Germany on YouTube.

=== 2019–present: Bra Music and collaborations with Samra ===
His sixth studio album CB6 was announced on 21 December 2018, through the music video of the first single "Benzema". The single became his eight single to reach the top of the charts in Germany. Balovatsky was signed to the Universal Music Group in January 2019 and left ersguterjunge on 22 January. The second single of the album, "Prinzessa", partly recorded in Russian, was released on 25 January and again debuted atop the German single chart. Balovatsky founded his own label Bra Music in March and announced a collaborative studio album with Samra, scheduled for release in 2019. Following a small dispute with Dieter Bohlen, he released a cover of Modern Talking's "Cheri, Cheri Lady".

His album CB6 was scheduled for release on 26 April, but was released digitally two weeks earlier on 12 April, following a leak of the record. In May, he became the most streamed artist in Germany, accumulating more than 1.4 billion streams, breaking the record previously set by Ed Sheeran. Furthermore, "Cherry Lady" accumulated the most streams in Germany across all platforms ever, with 11.5 million in its first week. All of his songs were streamed 66 million times in the week in Germany. On 1 May, Balovatsky performed in Ravensburg, Baden-Württemberg as part of his Gucciland-Tour. Shortly before the start of the concert, two teenagers were attacked with knives; no people were harmed.

His first collaborative album with Samra and follow-up to his first 2018 album, Berlin lebt was announced in May and was released on 4 October 2019. The first single of the album "Tilidin" was released in late June and became the most-streamed song in Germany within a day with three million, and the most in one week with about 15 million. In July, GfK Entertainment reported that "Benzema" and "Prinzessa" ranked in the top five of the best-performing singles of the first half of 2019.

== Musical style ==
Capital Bra's musical style has been described as gangster rap, cloud rap and trap. According to Rap.de, one of his trademarks are East Slavic and Arabic words.

== Political and socially critical statements ==
Outside of music, Balovatsky criticized the German political party Alternative for Germany (AfD), compared himself with Russian president Vladimir Putin and criticized the policy of the United States in several songs. Besides that, he released a song in 2014 with the title "Kein Krieg in der Ukraine" (in English "No war in Ukraine"), where he appealed for peace. He also spoke out about social injustice and did a song against bullying with two other artists.

In an interview published on YouTube, he spoke about his Tilidine dependence and warned about the drug.

== Discography ==
- Kuku Bra (2016)
- Makarov Komplex (2017)
- Blyat (2017)
- Berlin lebt (2018)
- Allein (2018)
- CB6 (2019)
- Berlin lebt 2 (2019)
- CB7 (2020)
- 8 (2022)
- Vladyslav (2024)

== Awards and nominations ==
=== Results ===
Year	Award	Nomination	Work	Result	Ref.
2018	HipHop.de Awards	Best Album National	Berlin lebt	Nominated	
2018	HipHop.de Awards	Best Song National	Neymar (with Ufo361)	Nominated	
2018	HipHop.de Awards	Best Line	Für euch alle	Nominated	
2018	HipHop.de Awards	Best Rap-Solo-Act National	Himself	Won	
2018	HipHop.de Awards	Best Song National	Chinchilla (with Summer Cem, KC Rebell)	Nominated	
2019	1Live Krone Awards	Best Single	110 (with Samra, LEA)	Nominated	
2019	1Live Krone Awards	Best Hip-Hop Act	Capital Bra & Samra	Nominated	
2019	HipHop.de Awards	Best Song National	DNA (with KC Rebell, Summer Cem)	Nominated	
2019	HipHop.de Awards	Best Song National	Wieder Lila (with Samra)	Nominated	
2019	HipHop.de Awards	Best Video National	Royal Rumble (with Luciano, Kalazh44, Nimo, Samra)	Nominated	
2019	HipHop.de Awards	Best Group National	Capital Bra & Samra	Won	
2019	HipHop.de Awards	Best Rap-Solo Act National	Himself	Won	
2019	Bravo Otto Awards	Hip-Hop National	Himself	Bronze	
2019	Hype Awards	Male Artist	Himself	Nominated	
2020	Swiss Music Awards	Best Solo Act International	Himself	Nominated	
2020	Swiss Music Awards	Best Group International	Capital Bra & Samra	Nominated	
2020	Bravo Otto Awards	Hip-Hop National	Himself	Nominated	
2020	1Live Krone Awards	Best Hip-Hop Act	Himself	Nominated	
2020	HipHop.de Awards	Best Video National	Einsam an der Spitze	Nominated	
2020	HipHop.de Awards	Best Line	Makarov Komplex II	Nominated	
2020	HipHop.de Awards	Best Rap-Solo-Act National	Himself	Nominated	
2021	Swiss Music Awards	Best Hit	Nicht verdient (with Loredana)	Nominated	
2021	Bravo Otto Awards	Hip-Hop national	Himself	Nominated	
2021	HipHop.de Awards	Best Song National	No Comprendo (with Jamule)	Nominated	
2021	HipHop.de Awards	Best Line	Die Wahrheit ist kein Hit	Nominated	
2022	HipHop.de Awards	Best Album National	Deutschrap Brandneu (with Farid Bang)	Pending	
2022	HipHop.de Awards	Best Group National	Capital Bra & Farid Bang	Pending	
2022	HipHop.de Awards	Artist of the Year National	Himself	Pending	

== Tours ==
=== Headliner ===
- 2017: Die echte Tour (with AK Ausserkontrolle)
- 2018: Capital Bra Tour
- 2018: Berlin Lebt Tour
- 2019: Gucciland Tour
- 2022: Capital Bra Arena Tour

=== Cancelled ===
- 2020: Berlin Lebt 2 Arena Tour (with Samra)
- 2021: Capital Bra x Samra Tour (with Samra)
