= Allein (album) =

Studio album by Capital Bra
- Released: 2 November 2018
- Recorded: 2018
- Label: EGJ

Capital Bra chronology
Berlin lebt (2018)	Allein (2018)	CB6 (2019)

Singles from Allein
- 1. "Fightclub" Released: 12 October 2018; 2. "Roli Glitzer Glitzer" Released: 19 October 2018; 3. "Allein" Released: 26 October 2018; 4. "Ich liebe es" Released: 26 October 2018

Allein (German pronunciation: [aˈlaɪn], "alone") is the fifth studio album by German rapper Capital Bra, released on 2 November 2018, through EGJ and distributed by Sony Music, digitally. Upon its release, the album debuted within the top five in German-speaking Europe. Four tracks of the album were released as singles, with "Roli Glitzer Glitzer" reaching No. 1 in Germany. The single "Fightclub"—a collaboration with AK Ausserkontrolle and Samra—reached No. 3 in Germany, making it Capital Bra's first single in six months to not debut atop the German single charts.

== Background ==
Capital Bra released his fourth studio album Berlin lebt in June 2018, to great commercial success. The album debuted at the pole positions in German-speaking Europe and all singles of the album reached the top of the German single chart. A week prior to the release of Berlin lebt, he left his label Team Kuku, because of differences in interests. The album was announced on 20 August 2018 by Capital Bra through Instagram. The album's release date was announced on 30 October 2018, as the last release through Team Kuku.

== Track list ==
Credits adapted from Apple Music and GEMA.

Allein
No.	Title	Writer(s)	Producer(s)	Length
1.	"Selbst verdient"	Vladislav Balovatsky	Lucry	2:31
2.	"Roli Glitzer Glitzer" (featuring Luciano & Eno)	Balovatsky; Ensar Albayrak; Patrick Großmann	Beatzarre; Djorkaeff	4:11
3.	"Allein"	Balovatsky	Tower Beatz	3:42
4.	"Maybach" (featuring Bushido)	Balovatsky; Anis Mohamed Youssef Ferchichi	Beatzarre; Djorkaeff; Bushido	2:54
5.	"Fightclub" (featuring Samra & AK Ausserkontrolle)	Balovatsky; Hussein Akkouche; Davut Altundal	Iad Aslan	3:57
6.	"Trikot von Turin"	Balovatsky	Lucry; Iad Aslan	2:56
7.	"Gucci Capi Tief"	Balovatsky	Beatzarre; Djorkaeff	3:22
8.	"Lass mal diese" (featuring Olexesh)	Balovatsky; Olexij Kossarew	Beatzarre; Djorkaeff	3:50
9.	"Ya Salam"	Balovatsky	Beatzarre; Djorkaeff	3:13
10.	"Safari" (featuring Zuna)	Balovatsky; Ghassan Ramlawi	Lucry	2:28
11.	"Ich liebe es" (featuring Samy & Xatar)	Balovatsky; Sami Abdel-Hadi; Giwar Hajabi	Beatzarre; Djorkaeff	2:47
12.	"Benz Diggi" (featuring Samra)	Balovatsky; Akkouche	Lucry	2:33
13.	"Schüsse fallen" (featuring Samra)	Balovatsky; Akkouche	Beatzarre; Djorkaeff	3:30
Total length:				41:54

== Charts ==
Chart (2018)	Peak position
Austrian Albums (Ö3 Austria)	3
German Albums (Offizielle Top 100)	2
German Hip Hop Albums (Top 20 Hip Hop)	1
Swiss Albums (Schweizer Hitparade)	5
