= Summer Cem =

German rapper

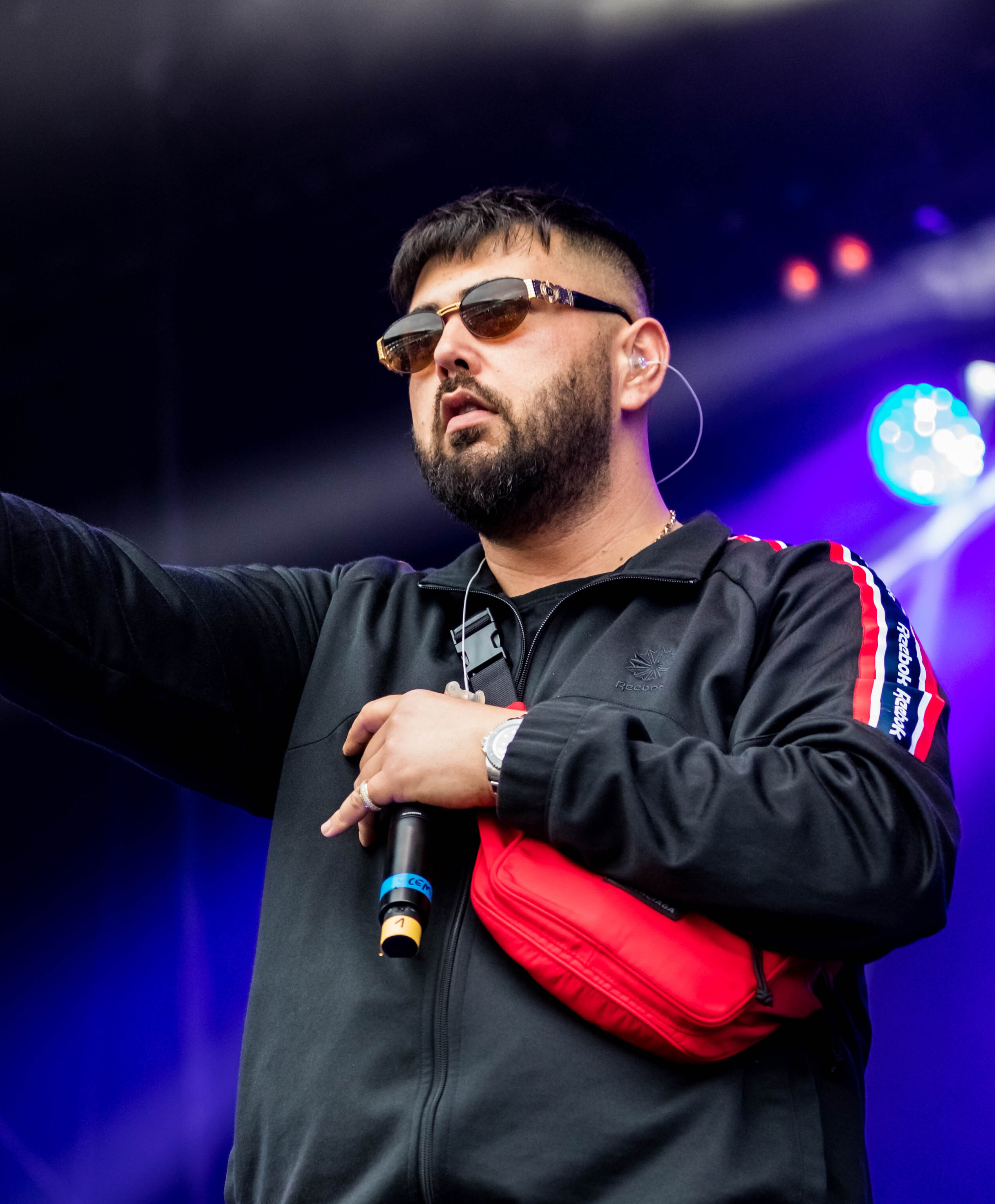
- Summer Cem during Rock im Park 2018

Background information
- Born: Cem Toraman; 11 April 1983 (age 43); North Rhine-Westphalia, Germany
- Genres: Pop rap; gangsta rap; trap
- Occupation: Rapper
- Years active: 2003–present
- Labels: Banger Musik, German Dream Entertainment, ersguterjunge

Cem Toraman (born 11 April 1983), better known as Summer Cem, is a German rapper of Turkish descent. He is known for frequent collaborations, particularly with KC Rebell and others.

He has had seven albums with three topping the German albums chart, solo album Cemesis in 2016, and joint album Maximum with KC Rebell in 2017 and Endstufe in 2018.

== Discography ==
=== Albums ===
Year	Title	Peak chart positions		
Year	Title	GER	AUT	SWI
2010	Feierabend	85	—	—
2012	Sucuk & Champagner	10	32	26
2013	Babas, Barbies & Bargeld	5	25	26
2014	HAK	4	7	8
2016	Cemesis	1	4	4
2018	Endstufe	1	4	1
2019	Nur noch nice	2	4	6
2024	Siki Jackson	5	23	7

=== Collaborative albums ===
Year	Title	Peak chart positions		
Year	Title	GER	AUT	SWI
2017	Maximum (credited to KC Rebell x Summer Cem)	1	1	1
2020	Maximum III (credited to KC Rebell x Summer Cem)	2	1	8

=== Singles ===
Year	Title	Peak chart positions			Album
Year	Title	GER	AUT	SWI	Album
2014	"Mafia Musik" (feat. Farid Bang)	59	75	—	
2014	"100"	83	—	—	
2018	"200 Düsen"	94	—	—	
2018	"Tamam tamam"	7	11	45	
2018	"Chinchilla" (feat. KC Rebell & Capital Bra)	11	14	35	
2018	"Casanova" (with Bausa)	4	4	37	
2018	"Crew"	28	51	—	
2018	"Santorini" (feat. Veysel)	15	30	65	
2018	"Alles vorbei"	44	74	—	
2018	"Molotov" (feat. RAF Camora)	27	25	60	
2018	"Weg weg weg" (feat. Farid Bang)	79	—	—	
2019	"Diamonds" (featuring Capital Bra)	3	5	5	
2019	"Yallah Goodbye" (featuring Gringo)	5	10	20	
2019	"Bayram" (featuring Elias)	23	37	70	
2019	"Rollerblades" (featuring KC Rebell)	8	13	21	
2019	"Primetime"	9	14	25	
2019	"Summer Cem" (featuring Luciano)	6	6	6	
2019	"Pompa"	16	29	55	
2019	"Mambo No. 5"	34	65	74	
2020	"Geht nich gibs nich" (with KC Rebell)	4	7	15	
2020	"Fly" (with KC Rebell)	4	6	14	
2020	"Valla nein!" (with KC Rebell featuring Luciano)	2	3	7	
2020	"XXL" (with Miksu, Macloud and Luciano featuring Jamule)	2	2	3	
2020	"Geh dein Weg" (with KC Rebell featuring Loredana)	4	6	8	
2020	"QN" (with KC Rebell)	9	17	29	
2020	"Wow" (with KC Rebell)	26	49	86	
2020	"Anani Bacini" (with KC Rebell)	23	41	64	
2020	"Amcaoğle" (with KC Rebell featuring Capital Bra)	14	24	27	
2020	"Down" (with KC Rebell)	5	—	28	

Featured in

Year	Title	Peak chart positions			Album
Year	Title	GER	AUT	SWI	Album
2014	"Hayvan" (KC Rebell feat. Summer Cem)	78	—	—	
2014	"Manchmal" (Majoe feat. KC Rebell & Summer Cem)	76	—	—	
2015	"Augenblick" (KC Rebell feat. Summer Cem)	71	—	—	
2016	"Benz AMG" (KC Rebell feat. Summer Cem)	37	—	—	
2016	"Rap Money" (Kollegah feat. Summer Cem)	64	—	—	
2017	"Banger Imperium" (Majoe feat. Farid Bang, KC Rebell, Jasko, Summer Cem, 18 Karat & Play69)	82	—	—	
2017	"Bis hier und noch weiter" (Adel Tawil feat. KC Rebell & Summer Cem)	23	72	97	Adel Tawil album So schön anders
2018	"Royals & Kings" (Glasperlenspiel feat. Summer Cem)	70	—	—	
2018	"Sag schon" (Veysel feat. Summer Cem)	18	31	41	Veysel album Fuego
2019	"Rolex" (Capital Bra featuring Summer Cem and KC Rebell)	2	1	1	CB6
2019	"Guadalajara" (Bausa featuring Summer Cem)	40	40	—	Fieber
2019	"Phantom" (Reezy featuring Summer Cem)	9	14	24	Non-album single
2020	"Pablo & Sosa" (Gringo featuring Summer Cem)	38	48	91	Non-album single

=== Other charted songs ===
Year	Title	Peak chart positions			Album
Year	Title	GER	AUT	SWI	Album
2017	"Nicht jetzt" (KC Rebell x Summer Cem)	20	50	70	Maximum
2017	"Murcielago" (KC Rebell x Summer Cem)	14	48	75	Maximum
2017	"Outta Control" (KC Rebell x Summer Cem feat. Hamza)	58	—	—	Maximum
2017	"Voll mein Ding" (KC Rebell x Summer Cem feat. Adel Tawil)	34	65	—	Maximum
2017	"Tabasco" (KC Rebell x Summer Cem)	41	64	—	Maximum
2017	"Maximum" (KC Rebell x Summer Cem)	60	92	—	Maximum
2017	"Kafa bir milyon" (KC Rebell x Summer Cem)	77	—	—	Maximum
2017	"Pics wie ein Fan" (KC Rebell x Summer Cem)	85	—	—	Maximum
2017	"Focus" (KC Rebell x Summer Cem feat. Hamza)	95	—	—	Maximum
2017	"Erdbeerwoche" (KC Rebell x Summer Cem feat. Elias)	65	—	—	Maximum
2019	"Swish"	—	11	18	Nur noch nice
2020	"Iron Man" (with KC Rebell)	17	33	45	Maximum III
