= KC Rebell =

German rapper

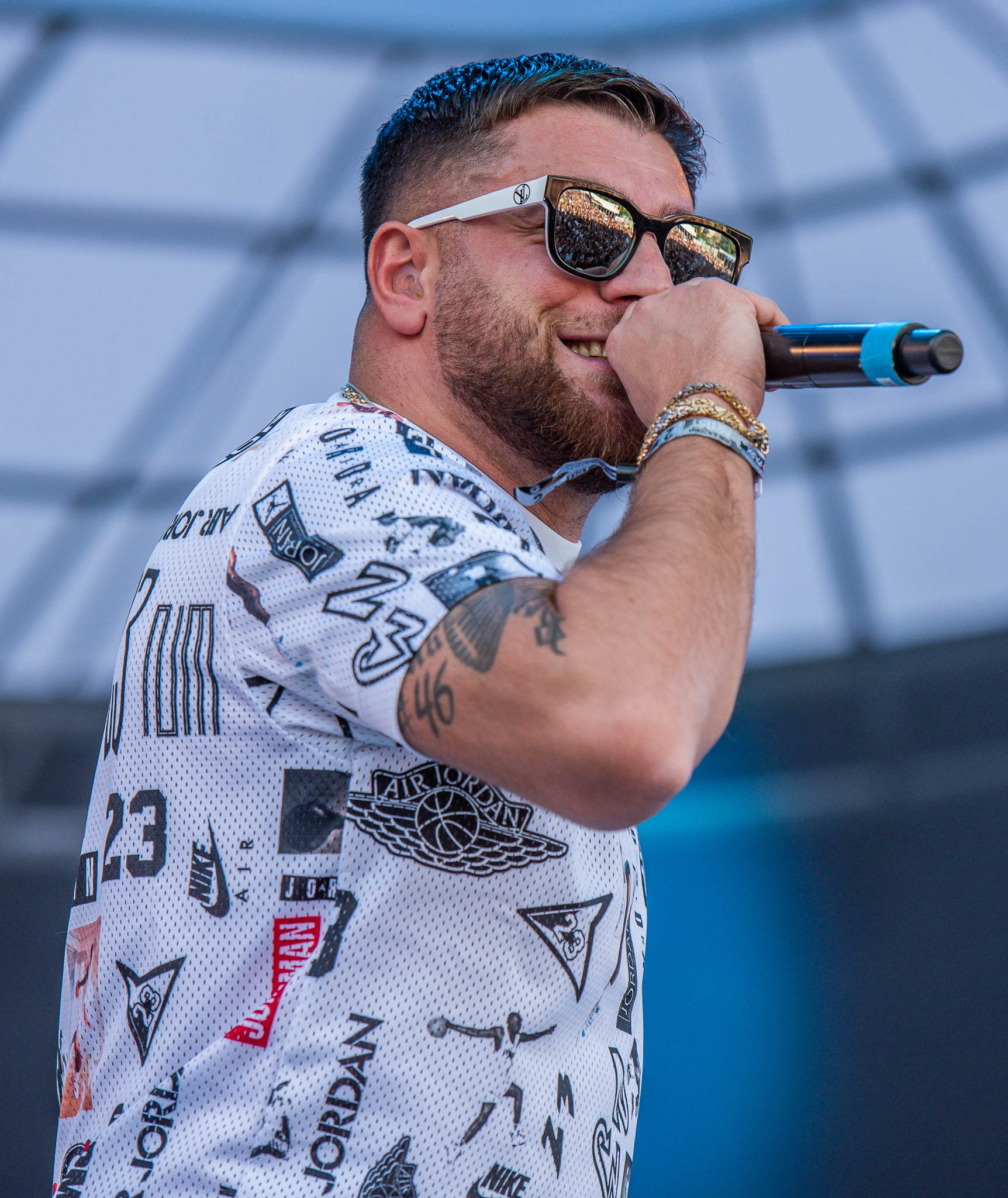
- KC Rebell performing in 2019

Background information
- Born: Hüseyin Kökseçen; 26 January 1988 (age 37); Pazarcık, Turkey
- Origin: Essen, Germany
- Genres: German hip hop, gangsta rap
- Occupation: Rapper
- Years active: 2003–present
- Labels: Banger Musik

Hüseyin Kökseçen (born 26 January 1988), better known as KC Rebell, is a German rapper of Kurdish descent. Based in Essen, Germany, he has an own label imprint "Rebell Army". He released six albums, four of which have peaked at number one on the German Albums Chart.

== Discography ==
=== Albums ===
Year	Title	Peak chart positions			Certification
Year	Title	GER	AUT	SWI	Certification
2011	Derdo Derdo	–	–	–	
2012	Rebellismus	33	–	97	
2013	Banger rebellieren	2	5	6	
2014	Rebellution	1	3	2	
2015	Fata Morgana	1	1	1	GER: Gold
2016	Abstand	1	4	1	GER: Gold
2019	Hasso	1	4	1	
2022	Rebell Army	4	18	19	
2026	Daddy Is Back	31	–	33	

=== Collaborative albums ===
Year	Title	Peak chart positions			Certification
Year	Title	GER	AUT	SWI	Certification
2017	Maximum (credited to KC Rebell and Summer Cem)	1	1	1	
2020	Maximum III (credited to KC Rebell and Summer Cem)	2	1	8	

=== Mixtapes ===
- 2011: Hoodmoney Freetape
- 2011: Hoodmoney Freetape 2
- 2012: RapRebell

=== Singles ===
Year	Title	Peak chart positions			Album
Year	Title	GER	AUT	SWI	Album
2013	"Kanax in Paris" (feat. Farid Bang)	60	66	–	Banger rebellieren
2014	"Kanax in Moskau" (feat. Farid Bang)	32	43	37	Rebellution
2014	"Hayvan" (feat. Summer Cem)	78	–	–	Rebellution
2015	"Bist du real" (feat. Moé)	15	23	52	Fata Morgana
2019	"Hasso"	26	43	61	Hasso
2019	"DNA" (featuring Summer Cem and Capital Bra)	1	1	5	Hasso
2019	"Alleen"	4	5	6	Hasso
2019	"Badewanne" (featuring Gringo)	15	17	37	TBA
2019	"Neptun" (with RAF Camora)	2	1	6	TBA
2020	"Geht nich gibs nich" (with Summer Cem)	4	7	15	Maximum III
2020	"Fly" (with Summer Cem)	4	6	14	Maximum III
2020	"Valla nein!" (with Summer Cem featuring Luciano)	2	3	7	Maximum III
2020	"Geh dein Weg" (with Summer Cem featuring Loredana)	4	6	8	Maximum III
2020	"Andere Welt" (with Capital Bra and Clueso)	2	2	3	CB7
2020	"QN" (with Summer Cem)	9	17	29	Maximum III
2020	"Wow" (with Summer Cem)	26	49	86	Maximum III
2020	"Anani Bacini" (with Summer Cem)	23	41	64	Maximum III
2020	"Amcaoğle" (with Summer Cem featuring Capital Bra)	14	24	27	Non-album single
2020	"Down" (with Summer Cem)	5	–	28	Non-album single

=== Featured in ===
Year	Title	Peak chart positions			Album
Year	Title	GER	AUT	SWI	Album
2014	"Manchmal" (Majoe feat. KC Rebell & Summer Cem)	76	–	–	Majoe album Breiter als der Türsteher
2016	"Pythonleder" (Kollegah feat. KC Rebell)	76	–	–	Kollegah album Imperator
2017	"Bis hier und noch weiter" (Adel Tawil feat. KC Rebell & Summer Cem)	23	72	97	Adel Tawil album So schön anders
2018	"Chinchilla" (Summer Cem feat. KC Rebell & Capital Bra)	4	4	37	Summer Cem album Endstufe
2018	"Gutes Herz" (Capital Bra feat. KC Rebell)	24	23	–	Capital Bra album Berlin lebt
2019	"Rolex" (Capital Bra featuring Summer Cem and KC Rebell)	2	1	1	Capital Bra album CB6
2019	"Rollerblades" (Summer Cem featuring KC Rebell)	8	13	21	Summer Cem album Nur noch nice

=== Other charted songs ===
Year	Title	Peak chart positions			Album
Year	Title	GER	AUT	SWI	Album
2014	"Egoist" (feat. Kollegah)	65	–	–	Rebellution
2015	"Augenblick" (feat. Summer Cem)	71	–	–	Fata Morgana
2016	"Paper"	53	–	–	Abstand
2016	"Leer"	31	50	67	Abstand
2016	"Mosquitos"	49	–	78	Abstand
2016	"TelVision" (feat. PA Sports, Kianush & Kollegah)	40	52	94	Abstand
2016	"iPhone 17" (feat. Moé)	19	59	57	Abstand
2016	"Ich brauch dich"	30	72	63	Abstand
2016	"Benz AMG" (feat. Summer Cem)	37	–	–	Abstand
2016	"Spiegel" (feat. Kool Savas)	42	–	60	Abstand
2016	"Alpha"	65	–	–	Abstand
2016	"Wunderbar"	75	–	–	Abstand
2016	"Intro"	80	–	–	Abstand
2016	"Sie" (feat. Frida Gold)	81	–	–	Abstand
2016	"Das bist alles nicht du" (feat. 18 Karat)	90	–	–	Abstand
2016	"Ballermann (Wildlands)" (feat. Farid Bang)	94	–	–	Abstand
2017	"Nicht jetzt" (KC Rebell x Summer Cem)	20	50	70	Maximum
2017	"Murcielago" (KC Rebell x Summer Cem)	14	48	75	Maximum
2017	"Outta Control" (KC Rebell x Summer Cem feat. Hamza)	58	–	–	Maximum
2017	"Voll mein Ding" (KC Rebell x Summer Cem feat. Adel Tawil)	34	65	–	Maximum
2017	"Tabasco" (KC Rebell x Summer Cem)	41	64	–	Maximum
2017	"Maximum" (KC Rebell x Summer Cem)	60	92	–	Maximum
2017	"Kafa bir milyon" (KC Rebell x Summer Cem)	77	–	–	Maximum
2017	"Pics wie ein Fan" (KC Rebell x Summer Cem)	85	–	–	Maximum
2017	"Focus" (KC Rebell x Summer Cem feat. Hamza)	95	–	–	Maximum
2017	"Erdbeerwoche" (KC Rebell x Summer Cem feat. Elias)	65	–	–	Maximum
2018	"Entertainment" (RAF Camora feat. KC Rebell)	63	65	–	RAF Camera album Anthrazit
2019	"Quarterback"	8	6	12	Hasso
2019	"In der Nacht" (featuring RAF Camora and Kontra K)	57	–	–	Hasso
2019	"Kolibri" (featuring Ufo361)	86	–	–	Hasso
2019	"Für mich da" (featuring Veysel)	96	–	–	Hasso
2020	"Iron Man" (with Summer Cem)	17	33	45	Maximum III
