= AK Ausserkontrolle =

German rapper

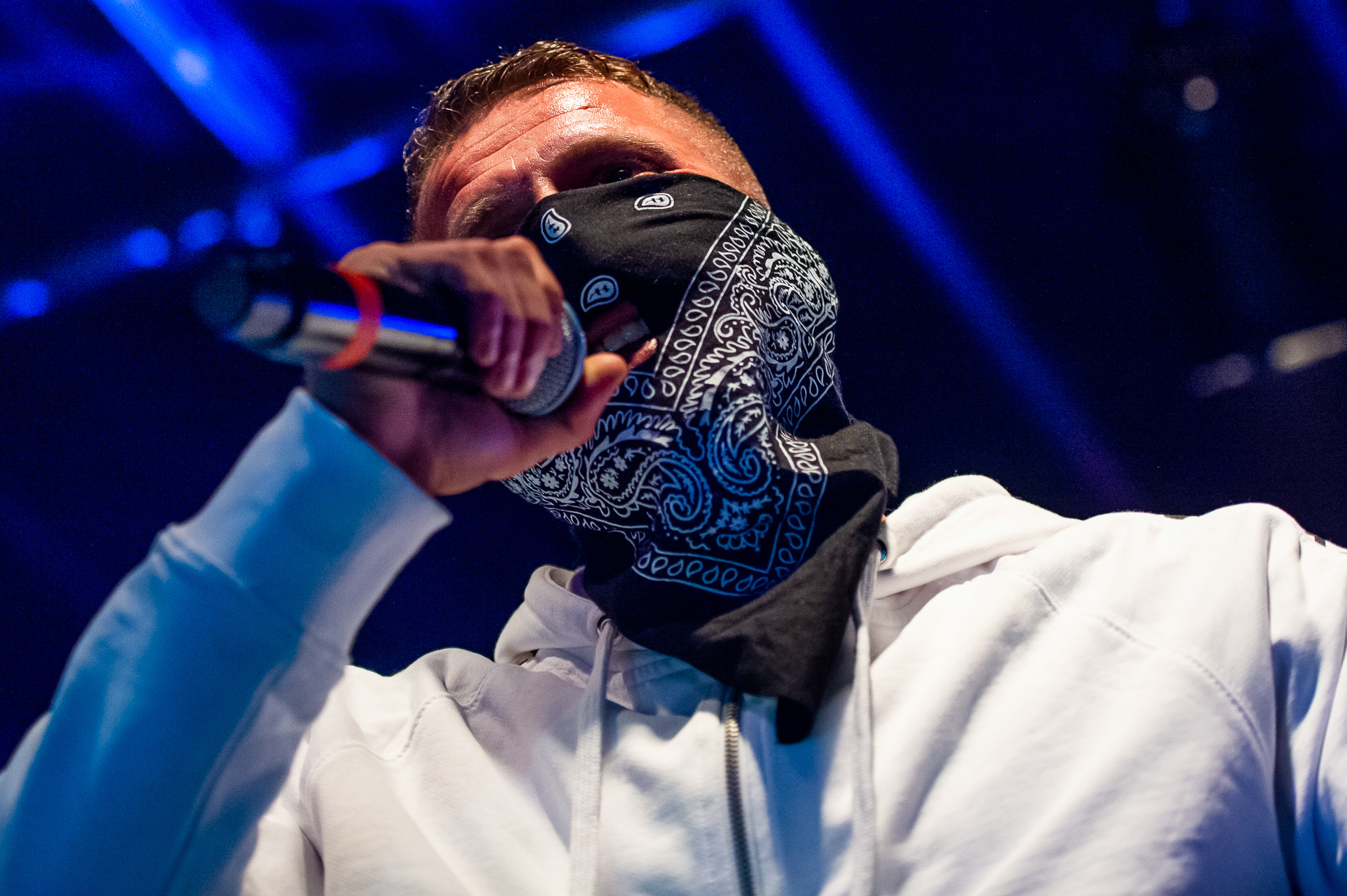
- AK Ausserkontrolle performing in 2019

Background information
- Born: Davut Altundal; Berlin, Germany
- Origin: Kurdish
- Genres: Hip hop
- Occupation: Rapper
- Label: XY Records

Davut Altundal, known professionally as AK Ausserkontrolle (lit. "AK Outta Control"), is a German rapper of Kurdish descent from Berlin.

== Biography ==
Altundal was born in Germany. His parents are from the Mardin Province in Turkey. They emigrated to Lebanon and later to Germany. He grew up in Wedding, a borough of Berlin. His friend Fux Ausserkontrolle founded the hip hop group Ausserkontrolle where he was member for a long time.

In 2017, Altundal decided to leave. In the same year, he also signed at Ersguterjunge, the music label of the rapper Bushido and his business partner Arafat Abou Chaker. After a dispute between Bushido and Abou Chaker, the label split up and AK Ausserkontrolle and almost all the other signings have left it in 2018. After that, he founded his own label XY Records.

Altundal has previously committed burglaries and robberies in stores. Because of his previous convictions, he was requested to leave Germany to Turkey in April 2019, but he refused, and in May 2019 he got a residence permit valid for at least three years.

AK Ausserkontrolle wears a bandana which covers his face to stay anonymous.

== Discography ==
=== Albums ===
Year	Title	Peak chart positions		
Year	Title	GER	AUT	SWI
2016	Panzaknacka	10	40	26
2017	A.S.S.N.	3	14	14
2018	XY	5	12	18
2019	XY Sampler	63	–	–
2020	A.S.S.N. 2	1	1=	5
