= Haftbefehl discography =

German rapper Haftbefehl has released seven studio albums, one collaborative album and two mixtapes.

== Albums ==
=== Studio albums ===
List of studio albums, with chart positions
Title	Album details	Peak chart positions		
Title	Album details	GER	AUT	SWI
Azzlack Stereotyp	Released: 29 October 2010; Label: Echte Musik; Formats: CD, digital download	59	—	—
Kanackiş	Released: 10 February 2012; Label: Echte Musik, Universal Music; Formats: CD, digital download	10	36	12
Blockplatin	Released: 25 January 2013; Label: Azzlackz; Formats: CD, digital download	4	6	7
Russisch Roulette	Released: 28 November 2014; Label: Urban; Formats: CD, digital download	4	10	7
Das weisse Album	Released: 5 June 2020; Label: Urban; Formats: Digital download, streaming	4	6	5
Das schwarze Album	Released: 30 April 2021; Label: Urban; Formats: Digital download, streaming	7	6	14
Mainpark Baby	Released: 2 December 2022; Label: Urban; Formats: Digital download, streaming	5	14	22

==== Collaborative albums ====
List of collaborative studio albums, with chart positions
Title	Album details	Peak chart positions		
Title	Album details	GER	AUT	SWI
Der Holland Job (with Xatar)	Released: 12 August 2016; Label: Azzlack; Formats: CD, digital download	1	1	1

=== Mixtapes ===
List of mixtapes, with chart positions
Title	Album details	Peak chart positions	
Title	Album details	GER	SWI
The Notorious H.A.F.T.	Released: 24 February 2012; Formats: CD, digital download	—	—
Unzensiert	Released: 19 December 2015; Formats: CD, digital download	56	37

== Singles ==
List of singles as lead artist, with chart positions, showing year released and album name
Title	Year	Peak chart positions			Album
Title	Year	GER	AUT	SWI	Album
"Gestern Gallus, heute Charts"	2010	—	—	—	Azzlack Stereotyp
"Chabos wissen wer der Babo ist"	2012	30	—	—	Blockplatin
"Saudi Arabi Money Rich"	2014	76	66	—	Blockplatin
"Lass die Affen aus’m Zoo"	2014	74	—	—	Blockplatin
"Ich rolle mit meim Besten"	2014	48	—	—	Blockplatin
"Bolon"	2020	20	64	70	Das weisse Album
"RADW"	2020	30	16	93	Das weisse Album
"1999 Pt. 5 (Mainpark Baby)"	2020	90	—	6	Das weisse Album
"Conan × Xenia" (with Shirin David)	2020	4	12	19	Das weisse Album
"Morgenstern"	2020	94	—	—	Das weisse Album
"KMDF" (with Shindy)	2020	15	28	33	Das weisse Album
"Casablanca" (with Dú Maroc and Fler)	2020	82	—	—	Cortado

== Other charted songs ==
List of other charted songs, with chart positions, showing year released and album name
Title	Year	Peak chart positions		Album
Title	Year	AUT	SWI	Album
"1999 (Pt. III)"	2014	8	12	Russisch Roulette
"069"	2020	3	5	Unzensiert

== Free tracks ==
- 2009: An alle Azzlackz
- 2009: Wieso, Warum (feat. Jonesmann)
- 2009: Wir feuern dich (feat. Jonesmann & Criz)
- 2009: Zu groß (feat. Jonesmann & Manuellsen)
- 2009: Wie die Tränen meiner Mutter
- 2009: Sound für die Nacht (feat. JAM)
- 2009: Koma (Remix) (feat. Blaze, Jonesmann, Favorite & Vega (Rapper)|Vega)
- 2010: Bitch da hast du
- 2010: An alle Azzlacks
- 2010: Schwarz (feat. Afro Hesse)
- 2010: Psst! (MeineStadt2010)
- 2010: Nightlife (feat. Inferno und Aikido)
- 2010: Wir machen Patte (feat. Doezis und Kamran)
- 2010: Ich nehm dir alles weg
- 2010: Für die Jungs (feat. Omik K.)
- 2010: OF Crackflow
- 2010: Azzlack zerbersten (feat. Zerbersten)
- 2010: Columbine! (feat. Silla, Twin und Criz)
- 2010: Chabo Nation Azzlackz (feat. Son Saifa und Midy Kosov)
- 2018: Mathematik Lindemann (feat. Haftbefehl)

== Juice Exclusives ==
- 2009: Spiel mit dem Feuer (feat. Blaze, Criz und Jonesmann) (Juice-Exclusive! auf Juice-CD #99)
- 2009: Duck dich (feat. Blaze, Criz und Jonesmann) (Juice Exclusive! auf Juice-CD #100)
- 2010: Streichhölzer & Benzinkanister (Juice-Exclusive! auf Juice-CD #107)
- 2018: Mathematik (feat. Lindemann)

== Halt die Fresse ==
- 2009: Halt die Fresse : 01 - NR. 32 - Haftbefehl
- 2010: Halt die Fresse : 03 - NR. 78 - Haftbefehl
- 2011: Halt die Fresse Gold - NR. 02 - Haftbefehl
- 2012: Halt die Fresse : 04 - NR. 187 - Haftbefehl
- 2012: Halt die Fresse : 04 - NR. 215 - Haftbefehl (feat. Xatar, Celo & Abdi und Capo)
- 2013: Halt die Fresse : 05 - NR. 267 - Haftbefehl (feat. Veysel)
- 2013: Halt die Fresse Platin - 01 - Haftbefehl
- 2014: Halt die Fresse : 06 - NR. 329 - Milonair & Haftbefehl („Ballermann“)

== Guest appearances ==
List of non-single guest appearances with other performing artists
Title	Year	Other artist(s)	Album
"Pibissstrahlen auf 808 Bässe"	2016	SSIO	0,9
"Macha Macha"	2016	Beginner	Advanced Chemistry
