= Emilio Sakraya =

German actor and singer

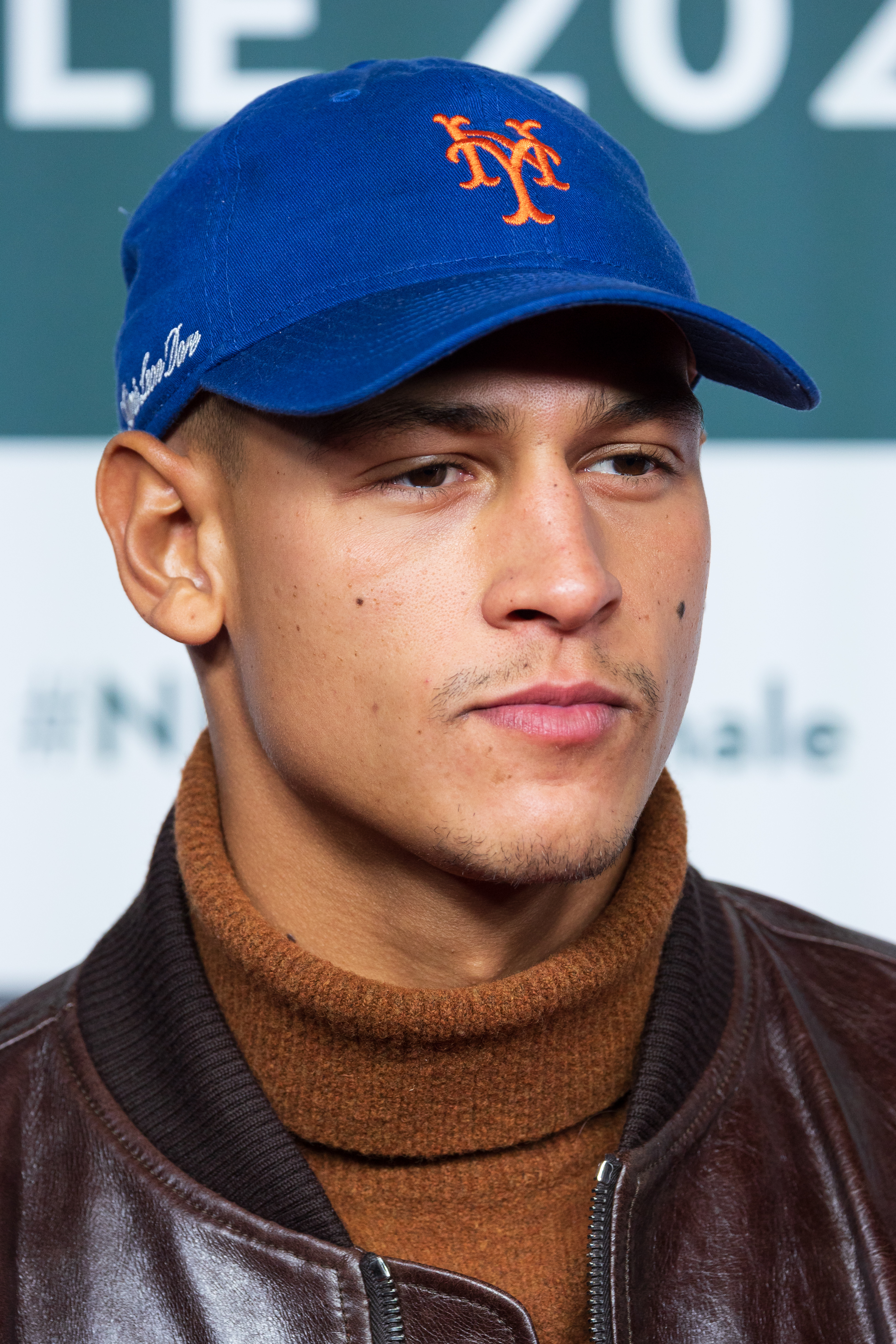
- Born: Emilio Sakraya Moutaoukkil; 29 June 1996 (age 30); Berlin, Germany
- Occupations: Actor; singer
- Years active: 2005–present
- Children: 1
- Mother: Meryem Moutaoukkil
- Relatives: Ilyes Raoul (half-brother)

Emilio Sakraya Moutaoukkil (born 29 June 1996), also known as Emilio, is a German actor and singer.

Known for his roles in Rhinegold, Tribes of Europa, and Warrior Nun, he has gained recognition for his performances in both German and international productions, establishing himself as a versatile actor in film and television.

== Early life and education ==
Emilio Sakraya Moutaoukkil was born on 29 June 1996 in Berlin, Germany, to Meryem Moutaoukkil, a Moroccan-German actress, and a Serbian father. He has several half-siblings, including actor Ilyes Raoul. He attended the Annie Heuser Waldorf School in Wilmersdorf.

== Career ==
Sakraya began his career at the age of nine, appearing in the 2005 commercial Tell Children. In addition to acting, he pursued martial arts, winning a German championship in karate within the World Kickboxing Association (WKA) in 2010. That same year, he made his film debut in Zeiten ändern dich, directed by Bernd Eichinger.

In 2017, Sakraya gained attention for his role in the Tatort episode Sons and Fathers. His performance led to a lead role in the 2018 film Kalte Füße, alongside Heiner Lauterbach and Sonja Gerhardt. That same year, he starred in Tatort: The Missing Child and was nominated for the Studio Hamburg Nachwuchspreis.

In 2019, he gained international recognition for his role as JC in the Netflix fantasy series Warrior Nun and starred in Tribes of Europa, created by Philip Koch.

In 2022, Sakraya was selected for the Shooting Stars Award, recognizing him as one of Europe’s most promising actors. That same year, he portrayed gangsta rapper Xatar in Rhinegold, directed by Fatih Akin. His performance was critically acclaimed.

In 2024, Sakraya appeared on Schlag den Star, competing against rapper Bausa, and featured in Sing meinen Song – Das Tauschkonzert.

In October 2026, he was cast as Xaden Riorson in the upcoming Amazon Prime Video adaptation of Fourth Wing, based on the 2023 romantic fantasy novel by Rebecca Yarros.

== Music career ==
Sakraya is also a musician. In 2016, he released his debut single, Down by the Lake, followed by his 2020 debut album, Roter Sand, under Jive Records.

== Personal life ==
In 2024, Sakraya revealed that he is a father, a fact he had previously kept private. In 2025, he was in a brief relationship with Spanish singer Rosalía.

== Filmography ==
=== Cinema ===
- 2008: Speed Racer
- 2010: Zeiten ändern dich
- 2013: V8 – Du willst der Beste sein
- 2013: Der Prinz von Gmünd (short film)
- 2014: Bibi & Tina: Voll verhext!
- 2016: Bibi & Tina: Mädchen gegen Jungs
- 2017: Bibi & Tina: Tohuwabohu Total
- 2017: Rock My Heart – Mein wildes Herz
- 2018: Heilstätten
- 2018: Meine teuflisch gute Freundin
- 2018: Cold Feet
- 2021: The Salvation of The World as We Know It
- 2021: One Night Off
- 2022: Lieber Kurt
- 2022: Rhinegold
- 2024: 60 Minuten
- 2026: Fortitude
- TBA: Das Kind in dir muss Heimat finden
- TBA: C.L.A.Y

=== Television ===
- 2012: Die Draufgänger (TV series, episode Family Ties)
- 2014: Kein Entkommen (TV film)
- 2014: Die Detektive (TV series, 1 episode)
- 2015: Mitten in Deutschland: NSU (miniseries, 1 episode)
- 2015: Letzte Ausfahrt Sauerland (TV series)
- 2016: Die siebte Stunde (TV film)
- 2016: Löwenzahn (TV series, 1 episode)
- 2016: Die Opfer – Vergesst mich nicht (2nd episode of the trilogy Mitten in Deutschland: NSU)
- 2016: Solo für Weiss – Die Wahrheit hat viele Gesichter
- 2016: Winnetou – Der Mythos lebt
- 2017: Tatort: Father & Son
- 2017: 4 Blocks
- 2017: Vacation from Life (TV film)
- 2017: Der Schweinehirt (TV film)
- 2019: Tatort: The missing child
- 2020–2022: Warrior Nun
- 2021: Tribes of Europa
- 2024: Sing meinen Song – Das Tauschkonzert
- 2024: Those About to Die
- 2027: One Piece (Season 3)
- TBA: Fourth Wing

== Discography ==
| Title | Album details | Peak chart positions | | |
| Title | Album details | GER | AUT | SWI |
|---|---|---|---|---|
| Roter Sand | Released: 18 September 2020; Label: Jive Records (Sony) | 40 | 47 | 86 |
| 1996 | Released: 1 July 2022; Label: Jive Records (Sony) | 19 | 17 | 32 |
| Blessings | Released: 19 April 2024; Label: Jive Records (Sony) | 8 | 15 | 50 |
