= Cold Feet (2018 film) =

German-language comedy film

- Theatrical release poster
- Directed by: Wolfgang Groos
- Written by: Christof Ritter
- Produced by: Jakob Claussen; Uli Putz
- Starring: Heiner Lauterbach; Emilio Sakraya; Sonja Gerhardt
- Cinematography: Andreas Berger
- Edited by: Stefan Essl
- Music by: Helmut Zerlett
- Production companies: Deutsche Columbia Pictures Filmproduktion; Claussen + Putz Filmproduktion; Lotus-Film
- Distributed by: Sony Pictures Releasing
- Release dates: 21 November 2018 (Kinofest Lünen); 10 January 2019 (Germany)
- Running time: 97 minutes
- Countries: Germany; Austria
- Language: German
- Box office: $2.3 million

Cold Feet (German: Kalte Füße) is a 2018 German-language comedy film directed by Christof Ritter, starring Heiner Lauterbach, Emilio Sakraya and Sonja Gerhardt.

The film was released on 10 January 2019 by Sony Pictures Releasing to mixed reviews. The film garnered 100,000 admissions over its opening weekend.

== Plot ==
Denis is a young, unemployed petty criminal from Munich. He lives with his single mother, who urges him to find a job, and his siblings, who do not respect him. To settle his debts with the gangster Adam, Denis is forced by him to break into the secluded villa of the wealthy entrepreneur Raimund Groenert, who is in the hospital following a stroke. However, Raimund was discharged a day early and is now home alone. When Denis helps the man, who is lying on the floor, back into his wheelchair, Raimund's granddaughter Charlotte suddenly turns up. She is an aspiring police officer who was supposed to temporarily care for her grandfather until a professional caregiver took over the task.

Charlotte mistakes Denis for the new nurse. He goes along with the mix-up, as a police officer who is friends with Groenert is also present. His attempt to flee in the evening is thwarted by Groenert's dog. During the night, a violent snowstorm rages, making escape impossible. Unlike Charlotte, Raimund sees right through Denis immediately, but since he cannot speak, he has to defend himself against the crook by other means. A cat-and-mouse game begins between Denis and Raimund, during which Denis must face not only his criminal entanglements but also the challenges of caregiving and his growing affection for Charlotte.

Denis manages to call Adam. However, Adam does not believe him, thinking Denis has run away. Meanwhile, Denis and Charlotte grow closer after he warns her about her selfish boyfriend and helps her reconcile with her grandfather, whom she hadn't seen in 10 years. After Denis gets the power generator running again, Charlotte listens to an answering machine message from the real caregiver and knocks Denis unconscious. He confesses everything. Since they are still snowed in, they call a truce.

When the road is cleared, Denis says goodbye to return to Munich. Before leaving, however, he hands Charlotte a box of gifts from her grandfather to show her that he had been thinking of her all those years after all. While hitching a ride with a snowplow driver, he spots Adam and his bodyguard driving toward the villa. He rushes back to warn Charlotte. However, she and her grandfather have already been taken hostage to get to the contents of a safe that Denis had mentioned during his previous phone call. Using sign language, Denis manages to get the combination from Raimund.

In an attempt to fight back, Charlotte is kidnapped by Adam, and Denis is locked in the basement. Raimund manages to free him, and together, armed with a shotgun, they pursue the kidnappers on skis. The kidnappers crash into a snowplow, and Denis is able to free Charlotte, though he gets shot in the process. Charlotte and Raimund do not press charges for the break-in.

Some time later, when Denis is picked up from the hospital by his mother and siblings, his mother tells him that she was able to agree on three months of community service with the judge. Denis is glad not to have to go to prison, but he realizes that he must continue working as Raimund's caregiver. Charlotte and his mother had arranged this together as his punishment.

== Cast ==
- Heiner Lauterbach as Raimund Groenert
- Emilio Sakraya as Denis
- Sonja Gerhardt as Charlotte
- Aleksandar Jovanović as Adam
- Michael Ostrowski as Frank Peters
- Gerti Drassl as Gerti Drassl
- Alex Czerwinski as René
- Ischtar Isik as Tasha
- CrispyRob as Sanitäter
- Roman Schomburg as Sebastian Brandt

== Production ==
Principal photography began on 15 January 2018 in Austria and ended in March in Munich.
