= Capo (rapper) =

German rapper

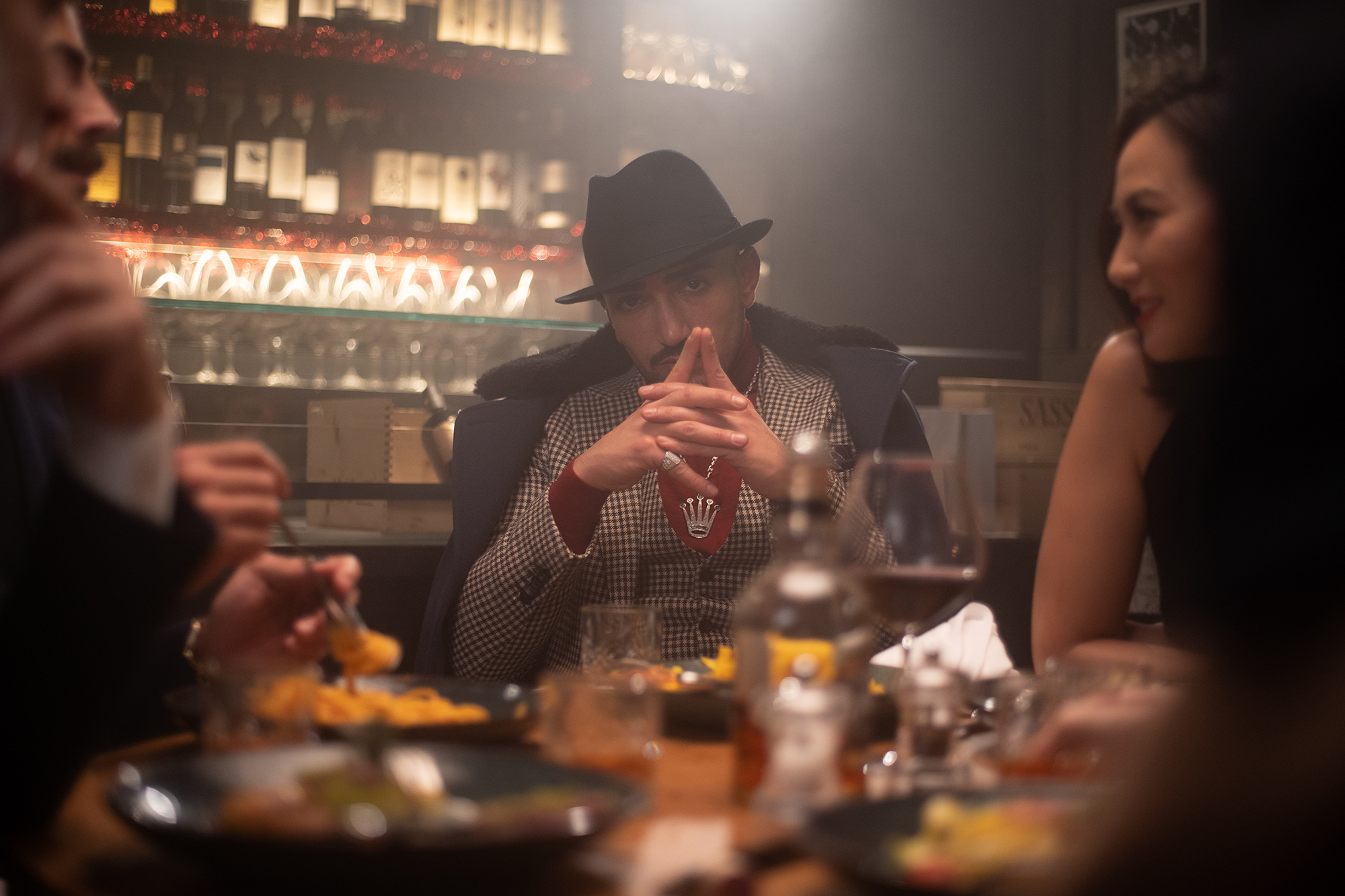

Background information
- Born: Cem Anhan; 23 May 1991 (age 34); Offenbach am Main, Germany
- Genres: Hip hop; gangsta rap
- Occupations: Rapper; songwriter; entrepreneur
- Years active: 2012–present
- Label: Alpha Music Empire

Cem Anhan (born 23 May 1991), known professionally as Capo or Capo Azzlack, is a German rapper of Turkish and Zaza-Kurdish descent. He is the younger brother of the rapper Haftbefehl.

== Life and career ==
Anhan was born in Offenbach am Main, Germany. He grew up in a Turkish-speaking household, raised by a Turkish mother from Giresun and a Zaza–Kurdish father from the East Turkish province of Tunceli. Anhan's father committed suicide when he was nine years old. Anhan's older brother Aykut Anhan, known as Haftbefehl fled to Istanbul in 2006, because of an impending imprisonment.

Haftbefehl released his second studio album Kanackis in February 2012. Capo had a guest part on the song Party mit uns. Capo released his first single as a lead artist, "Hater / Erzähl' ma" on 19 August 2013. His first studio album, Hallo Monaco was released on 4 October 2013 and debuted on number 21 of the German album charts. He went into a hiatus following his album release. In April 2017, he announced his second studio album, Alles auf Rot, which was released on 7 July 2017. The album reached the top 10 in Germany, Austria and Switzerland.

== Discography ==
=== Studio albums ===
List of studio albums, with chart positions
Title	Album details	Peak chart positions		
Title	Album details	GER	AUT	SWI
G.L.O.N.L	released 2013; label: Glory Boyz; formats: digital download; has features from Chief Keef, Ballout and G Herbo			
Hallo Monaco	Released: 4 October 2013; Label: Azzlack; Formats: CD, digital download	21	40	28
Alles auf Rot	Released: 7 July 2017; Label: Azzlack; Formats: CD, digital download	4	6	9
Hyat	Released: 2 July 2021; Label: Warner; Formats: Digital download, streaming	19	33	20

=== Collaborative albums ===
Title	Album details	Peak chart positions		
Title	Album details	GER	AUT	SWI
Capimo (with Nimo)	Release date: 22 March 2019; Label: 385idéal, Universal Music Group; Formats: CD, digital download	7	5	16

=== Singles ===
List of singles, with selected chart positions and certifications
Title	Year	Peak chart positions			Certifications	Album
Title	Year	GER	AUT	SWI	Certifications	Album
"Hater / Erzähl' ma"	2013	—	—	—		
"Champagner für alle"	2014	—	—	—		
"Julius Cesar" (featuring Haftbefehl)	2014	—	—	—		
"Intro"	2017	—	—	—		Alles auf Rot
"GGNIMG"	2017	—	—	—		Alles auf Rot
"Mainhattan City Gang"	2017	78	—	—		Alles auf Rot
"Lambo Diablo GT" (featuring Nimo)	2017	21	39	—	BVMI: 3× Gold	Alles auf Rot
"Matador" (featuring Tommy)	2017	—	—	—		Alles auf Rot
"Alles auf Rot"	2017	60	—	—		Alles auf Rot
"Totentanz"	2017	—	—	—		Alles auf Rot
"Mon Chéri" (featuring Nimo)	2017	9	10	38		non-album singles
"Flouz" (with Azzi Memo)	2018	—	—	—		non-album singles
"Flouz" (with Azzi Memo)	2018	—	—	—		non-album singles
"International Gangstas" (with Farid Bang and 6ix9ine feat. SCH)	2018	5	11	8		non-album singles
"Lean" (with Nimo)	2018	12	27	43		Capimo
"Zoey" (with Nimo)	2018	8	35	36		Capimo
"Anderes Niveau" (with Nimo)	2018	58	—	—		Capimo
"Shem Shem & Sex" (with Nimo)	2019	12	32	44		Capimo
"Roadrunner" (with Nimo)	2019	23	53	92		Capimo
"Leyla" (with Nimo)	2019	13	29	53		Capimo
"Planlos" (with Nimo)	2019	64	—	—		Capimo
"Dunkel" (with Nimo)	2019	23	43	49		Capimo
"Hadouken"	2019	52	—	—		non-album singles
"Alexander Wang"	2019	25	63	83		non-album singles
"Run Run Run"	2019	6	25	—	BVMI: Gold	non-album singles
"Im Rhythmus gefangen"	2019	11	30	38		non-album singles
"Puls steigt"	2019	50	—	—		non-album singles
"Karakol"	2020	15	32	36		non-album singles
"Cannabe"	2020	46	—	—		non-album singles
