= Rhinegold (2022 film) =

2022 drama films

Rheinegold
- Theatrical release poster
- Directed by: Fatih Akin
- Written by: Fatih Akin
- Based on: Xatar - Alles oder Nix: Bei uns sagt man, die Welt gehört dir
- Produced by: Fatih Akin; Herman Weigel; Nurhan Sekerci-Porst
- Starring: Emilio Sakraya; Mona Pirzad; Kardo Razzazi; Ilyes Raoul; Sogol Faghani; Hüseyin Top; Arman Kashani; Ensar Albayrak; Denis Moschitto; Uğur Yücel
- Cinematography: Rainer Klausmann
- Edited by: Andrew Bird
- Music by: Giwar Hajabi
- Production companies: Bombero International; Corazón International; Palosanto Films; Rai Cinema; Lemming Film; Warner Bros. Film Productions Germany
- Distributed by: Warner Bros. Pictures
- Release dates: 1 October 2022 (Filmfest Hamburg); 27 October 2022 (Germany)
- Running time: 139 minutes
- Countries: Germany; France
- Languages: German; Kurdish; Arabic; French; Turkish; Dutch; English
- Budget: $10.5 million
- Box office: $9.7 million

Rhinegold (German: Rheingold) is a 2022 German biographical gangster drama film written and directed by Fatih Akin and starring Emilio Sakraya. The film follows the life of Iranian-Kurdish hip-hop rapper, entrepreneur, and ex-convict Giwar Hajabi also known as Xatar. It premiered at the Filmfest Hamburg in October 2022 and had its Korean premiere at BIFAN on 3 July 2023.

== Cast ==
- Emilio Sakraya as Giwar Hajabi / Xatar
  - Ilyes Raoul as Teenage Xatar
  - Baselius Göze as Child Xatar
- Mona Pirzad as Rasal Hajabi
- Kardo Razzazi as Eghbal Hajabi
- Sogol Faghani as Shirin
- Hüseyin Top as Samy
- Arman Kashani as Miran
- Denis Moschitto as Maestro
- Ensar Albayrak as Ssiawosch Sadat / SSIO
- Uğur Yücel as Uncle Yero
- Meto Ege as Neighbor
