= SSIO =

German rapper

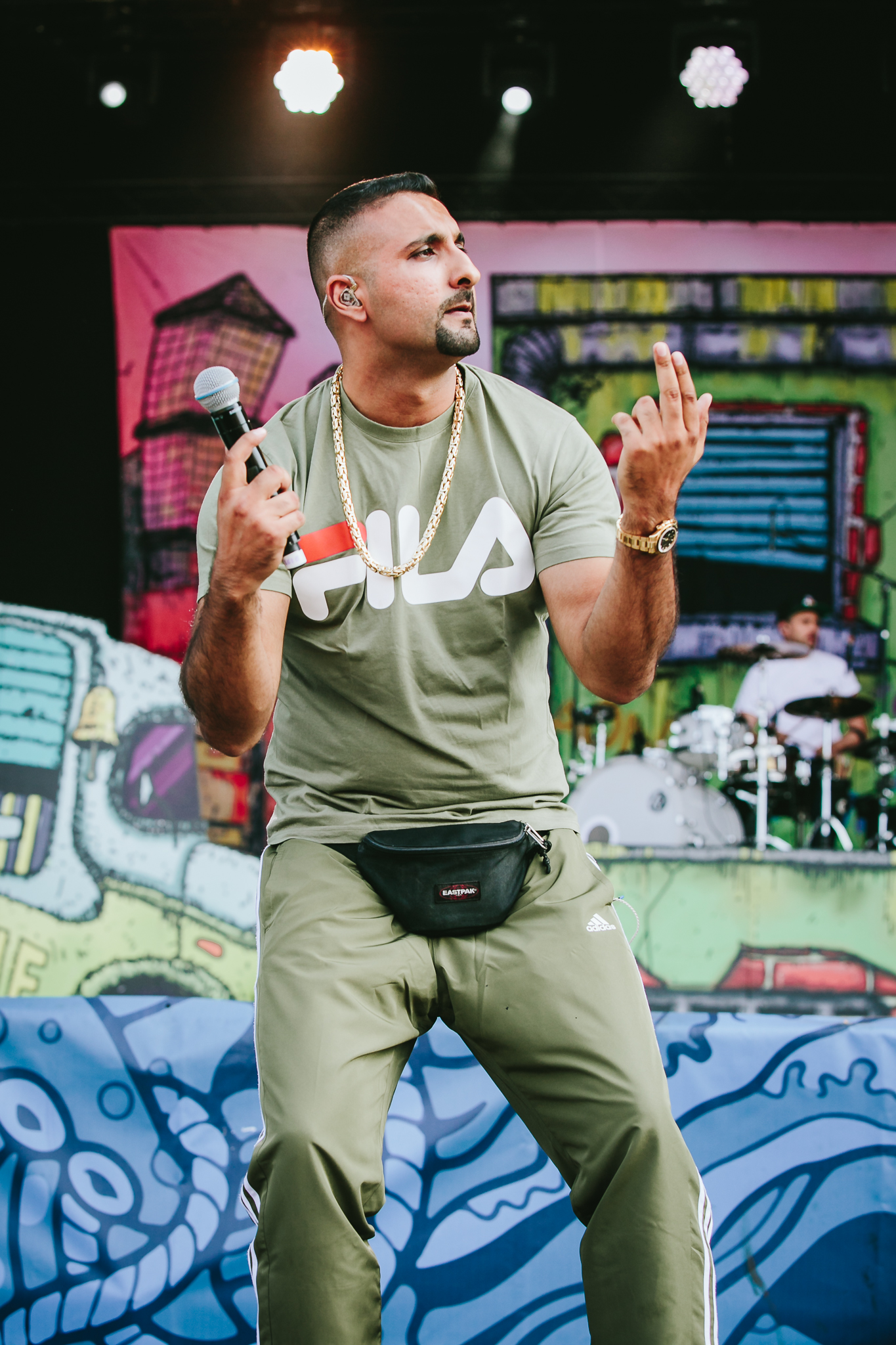
- SSIO performing at the Deichbrand Festival in 2018
- Born: Ssiawosch Sadat; January 28, 1989 (age 37); Bonn, North Rhine-Westphalia, Germany
- Other name: Kanakonda
- Occupation: Rapper
- Years active: 2007-present

Ssiawosch Sadat (born January 28, 1989, in Bonn), better known by his stage name SSIO, is a German rapper and music producer with Afghan roots.

== Life and career ==
Ssiawosch Sadat was born on 28 January 1989 in Bonn. In 1986, his family was forced to flee their native Afghanistan for political reasons. SSIO grew up in the Tannenbusch district of Bonn. Around the turn of the millennium, hip-hop culture first sparked SSIO's interest. In 2007, he joined Xatar's independent label, Alles oder Nix Records, under the name Kanakonda. He later changed his stage name to SSIO. He adopted this name because, due to his darker complexion compared to the rest of his family, he had been called سياه (siyāh, meaning black) since childhood. His older brother was also active at Alles oder Nix Records, where he managed the label alongside Xatar under the stage name Dingens.

Alongside his work as a rapper, SSIO studied Business Administration at the RheinAhrCampus Remagen of the Koblenz University of Applied Sciences.

In September 2012, SSIO released the mixtape Spezial Material, with which he entered the German album charts at number 69. A year later, he released his debut album, BB.U.M.SS.N., which entered the German charts at number six and also placed within the top 20 in Austria and Switzerland. His album 0,9, released on January 29, 2016, debuted directly at number one on the German album charts. Simultaneously, six individual tracks from the album charted on the German singles charts.

In 2025, SSIO achieved the highest chart placement of his career to date in the German singles charts with the single Alles oder nix. He reached number three and launched the promotional phase for his album of the same name.

== Style ==
SSIO's music style is mainly inspired by 1990s G-Funk and Boom Bap, occasionally incorporating elements of New Jack Swing.

SSIO often uses "bi-language" in his lyrics, similar to how Joachim Ringelnatz used it in his poem Gedicht in Bi-Sprache.

== Discography ==
=== Studio albums ===
BB.U.M.SS.N

- Released: 13 September 2013
- Label: Alles oder Nix Records
- Chart position: No. 6 DE, No. 19 AT, No. 18 CH

0,9

- Released: 29 January 2016
- Label: Alles oder Nix Records
- Chart position: No. 1 DE, No. 4 AT, No. 6 CH
- Certification: Gold (BVMI)

Messios

- Released: 6 December 2019
- Label: Alles oder Nix Records, Universal Music Group
- Chart position: No. 2 DE, No. 11 AT, No. 7 CH

Das neue Album

- Released: 8 September 2021
- Label: Alles oder Nix Records
- Chart position: No. 22 CH

Alles oder nix

- Released: 17 October 2025
- Label: Universal Music Group
- Chart position: No. 1 DE, No. 2 AT, No. 1 CH

=== Mixtapes ===
Spezial Material

- Released: 7 November 2012
- Label: Alles Oder Nix Records

== Awards ==
Hiphop.de Awards

- 2013: "Release des Jahres National" for BB.U.M.SS.N.
- 2025: "Bestes Album National" for Alles oder nix
- 2025: "Bestes Video National" for Alles oder nix
- 2025: "Bester Live-Act National"
- 2025: "Beat des Jahres" for Alles oder nix
- 2025: "Lyricist des Jahres"
- 2025: "Bester Rap-Solo-Act National"

Juice Awards

- 2012: "Mixtape des Monats" in the issue 10/2012 for Spezial Material
- 2013: "Album des Jahres National" for BB.U.M.SS.N.

Polyton

- 2026: "Rap" (Alles oder nix)

YouTube Music Awards

- 2025: "Best Visual Storytelling"
