= Daniel Zlotin =

German director and film producer

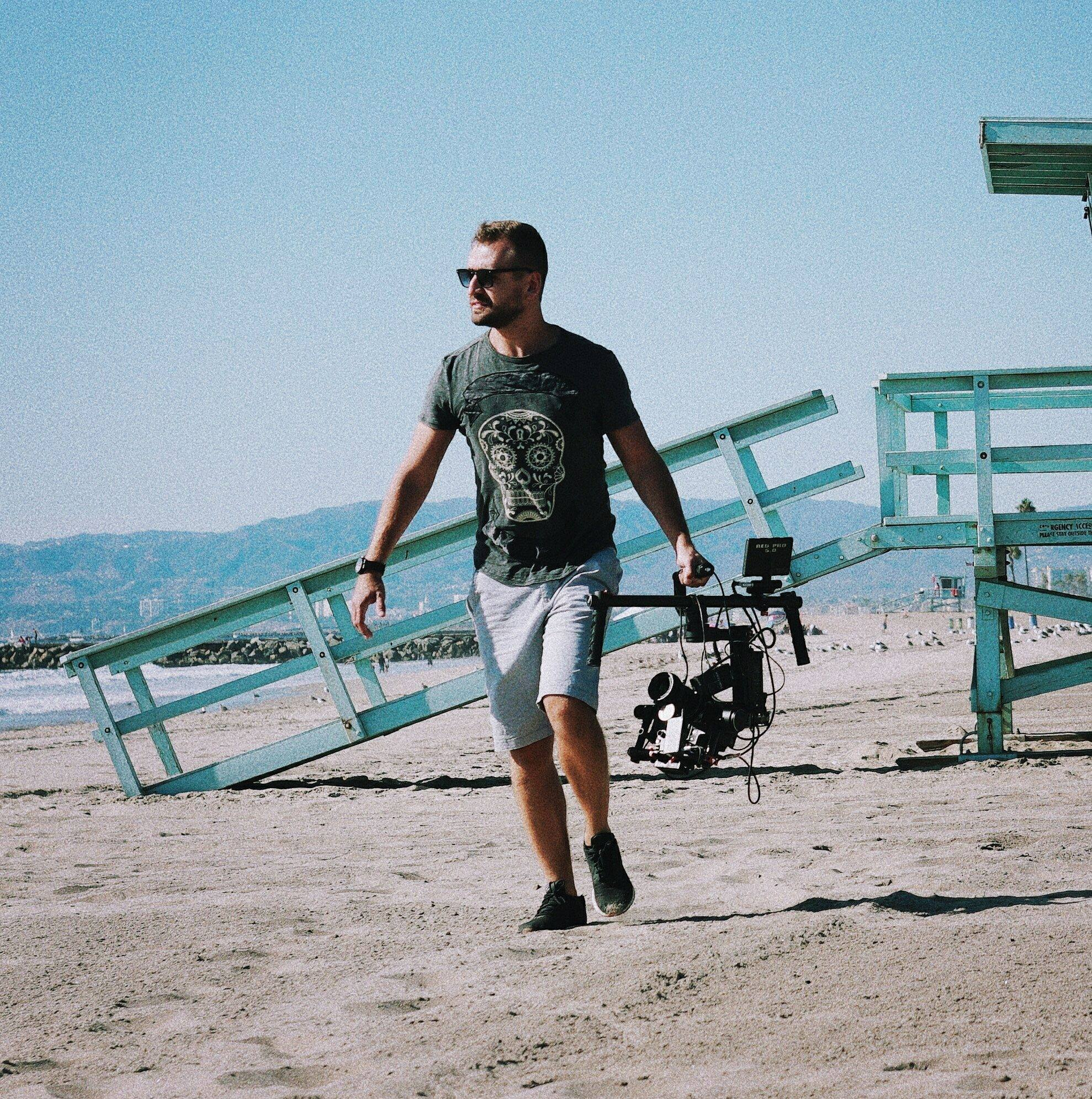
- Zlotin in 2017
- Born: June 8, 1984 (age 42); Kharkiv, Ukrainian SSR
- Occupations: Filmmaker, director, producer, cameraman and film editor
- Years active: 2002–present

Daniel Zlotin (Ukrainian: Даніель Злотін, born June 8, 1984, in Kharkiv, Ukrainian SSR) is a German director, producer, cameraman and film editor of Ukrainian origin living in Cologne. Since 2002 he has created more than 600 music videos for music artists. In 2007 Zlotin co-founded StreetCinema production company, which he co-owned until its closure in 2018.

== Career ==
Daniel Zlotin was born in 1984 in Kharkiv, Ukraine. He attended the Interregional Academy of Personnel Management in Kyiv (Межрегиональная академия управления персоналом). At the same time he pursued a musical career as a rapper. In early 2003 he completed his first music video for the song he had recorded with three other rappers. Zlotin presented this video to regional TV stations, some of which included it in their program. Upon receiving positive feedback and requests from a number of Ukrainian hip-hop musicians, he decided to focus on the production of music videos. In 2004 he moved to Cologne to study media design for picture and sound at the Georg-Simon-Ohm vocational college. As his final project, Zlotin shot a short film "Das Geburtstagsgeschenk", where the rapper Eko Fresh appears for the first time as an actor.

In 2007, together with Christian Schmitz and Malic Bargiel, Zlotin founded the media production company, StreetCinema, in Cologne, with which he subsequently produced commercials, image films and music videos. The company mostly specialized in the production of music videos, whereby they were responsible for the whole production process, from the conception through the technical implementation to post-production. Initially, StreetCinema mainly shot music videos for Eko Fresh and members of its German Dream label such as Farid Bang, Capkekz, SDiddy, Summer Cem and Manuellsen. In 2011 Zlotin began to shoot for pop musicians such as Revolverheld, Menowin Fröhlich, Tom Gaebel, Maite Kelly and Willi Herren. Later, while working on the video Massaka Kokain 2 of Massiv, he collaborated for the first time with Kollegah, the rapper contracted by the Selfmade Records. Zlotin continued to collaborate with the Düsseldorf label, for video creations by Favorite, Karate Andi and the 257ers, followed by a series of productions with Xatar and SSIO of Alles oder Nix Records.

According to Zlotin, the years 2013 and 2014 represented the boom phase of StreetCinema. Six to seven projects per month were realized during this time. Among others, first videos for Olli Banjo, KC Rebell and artists from Bushido´s music label Ersguterjunge, such as Baba Saad and Shindy, were created during this period. With the video Bleib in der Schule cooperation with artists from the music label Trailerpark was started. As of 2015, Zlotin made several videos for Majoe, Jasko, Mike Singer and MC Bilal. A year later, he completed his biggest project yet - a music video Boom Boom, which he co-directed with Said Naciri. The music video of RedOne, Daddy Yankee and French Montana received 23 million views on the first day. After one year, it has achieved nearly 120 million views. StreetCinema was dissolved with the approval of all three shareholders in the spring of 2018. Since then, Zlotin has been working under his own brand.

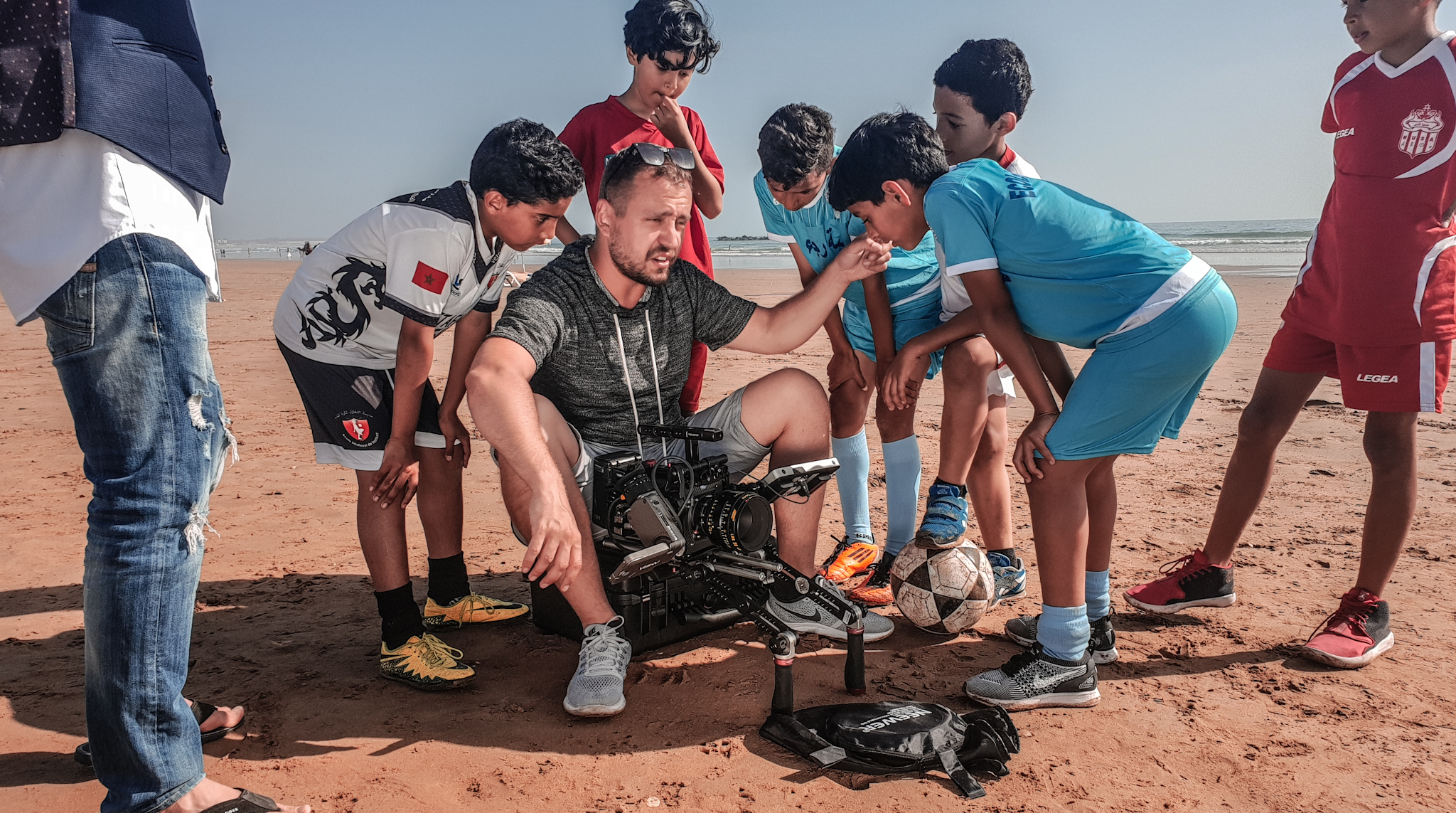
Video shoot in Agadir for One World by RedOne, Adelina and Now United

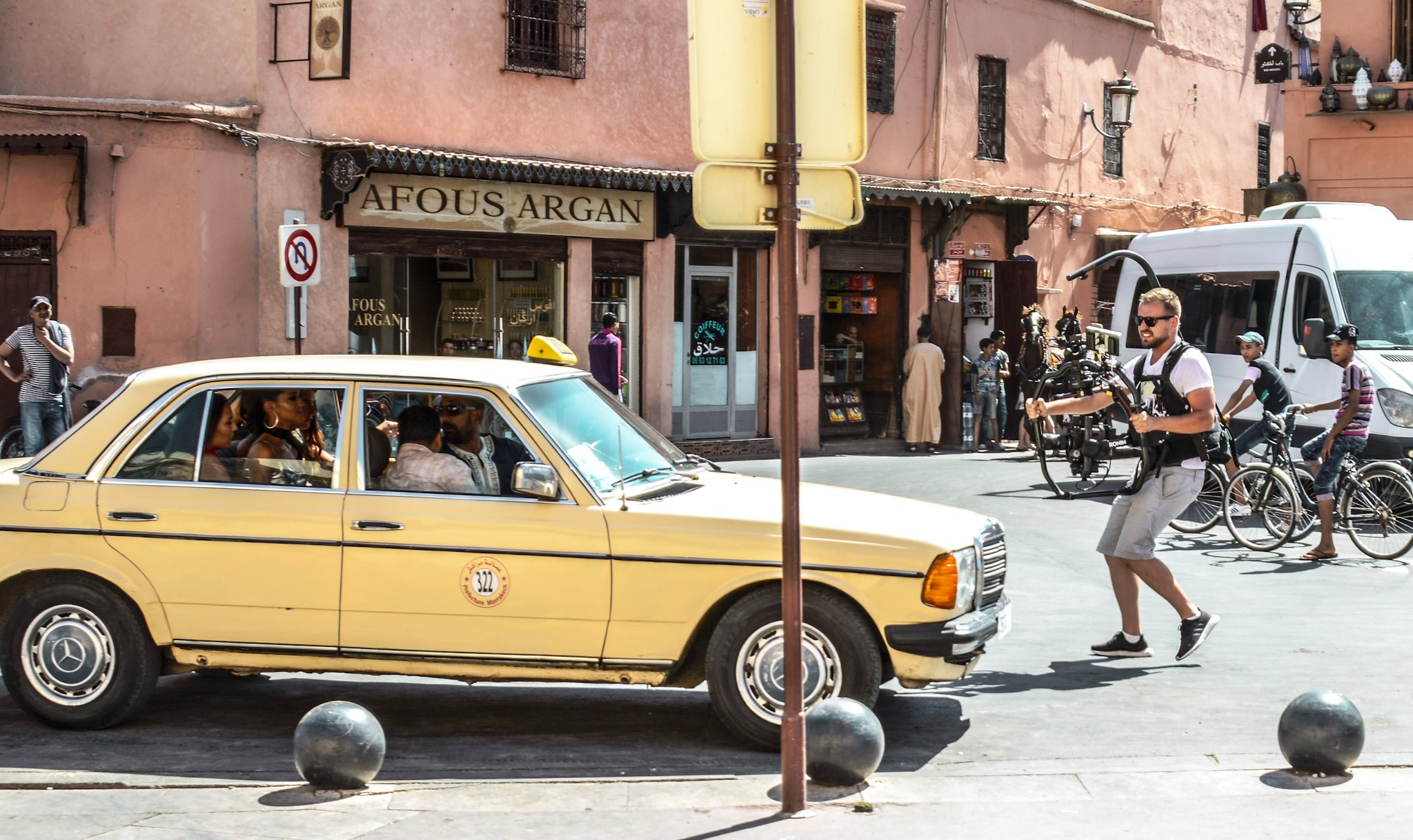
Video shoot in Marrakech for Shy Guy by Samantha J and Madcon

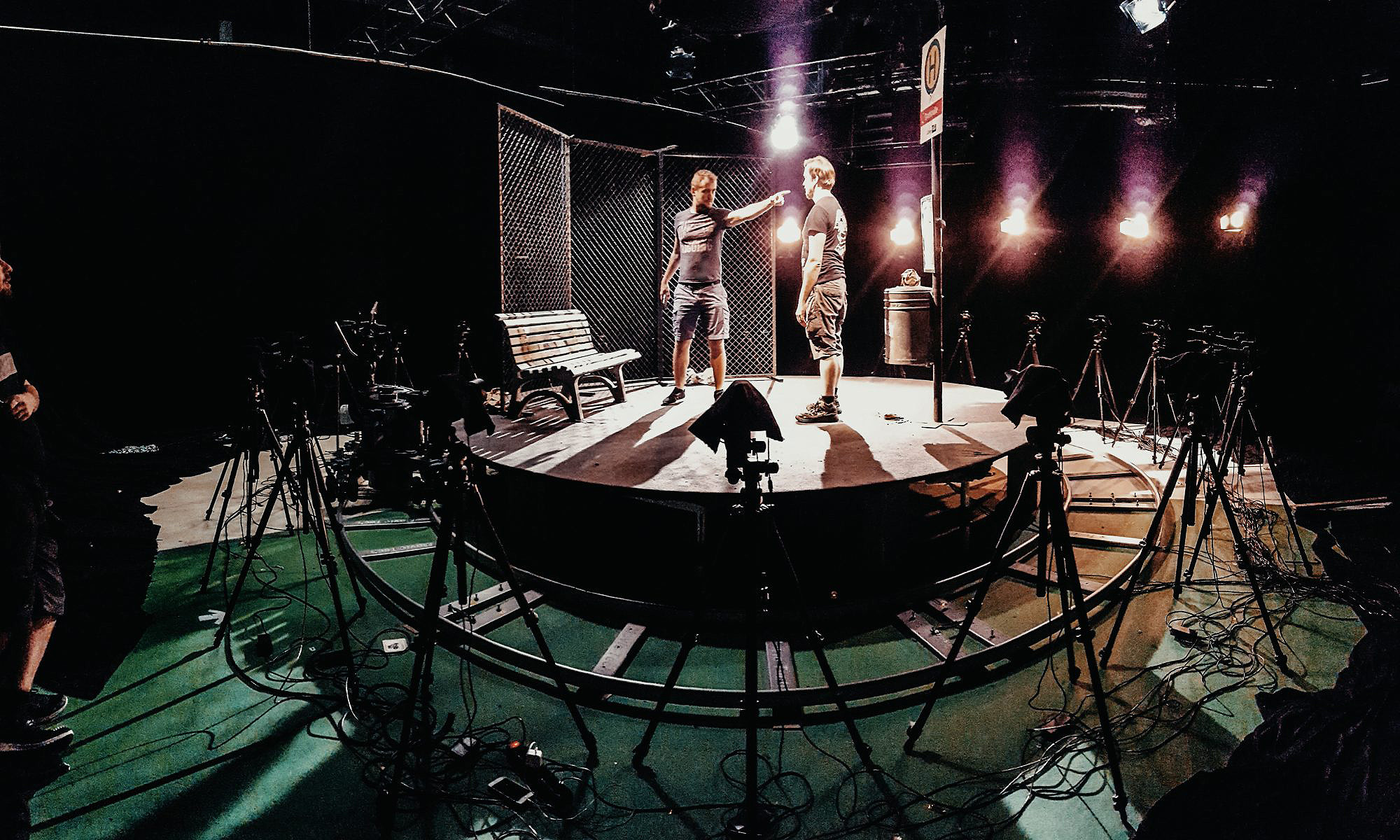
Video shoot in Cologne for Pharaoh by Kollegah

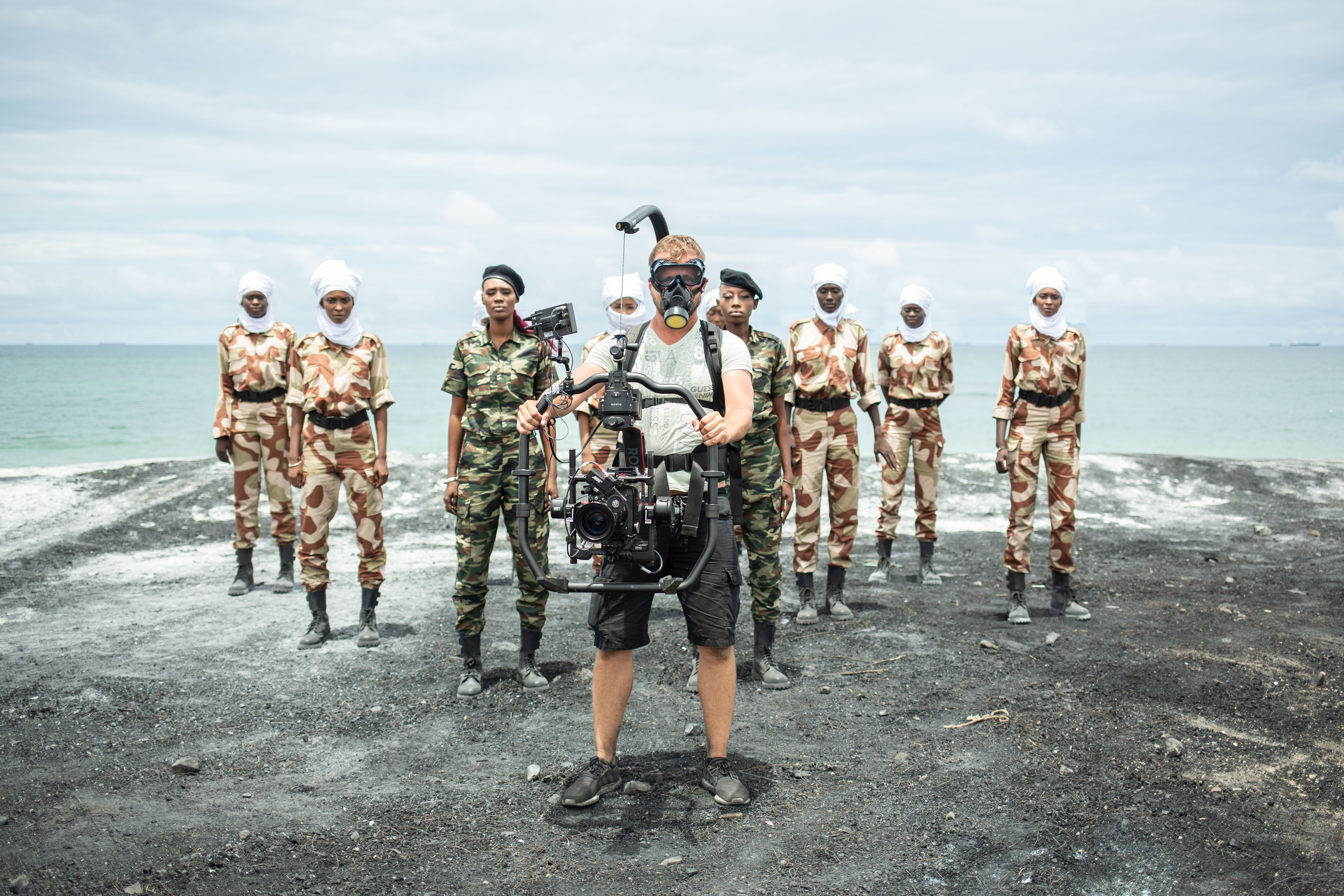
Video shoot in Dakar for Gaddafi by Xatar

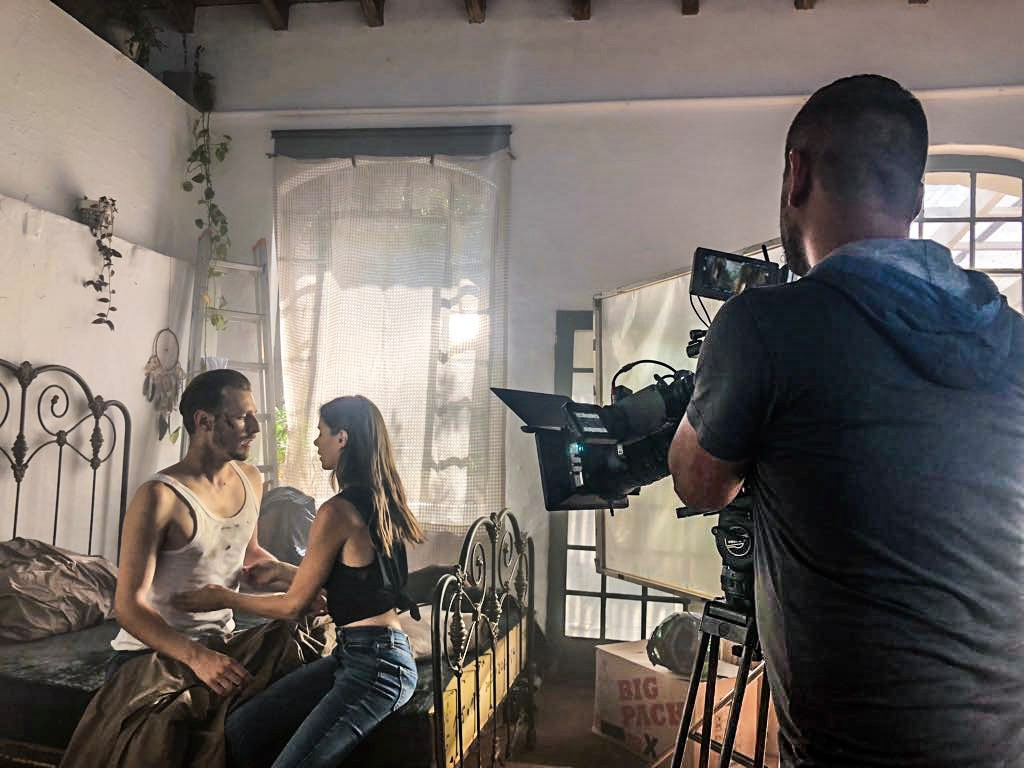
Video shoot in Cologne for Wo kann man das kaufen? by Alligatoah

== Filmography ==
=== Music videos (selection) ===
Release	Artists	Song	Jobs	Ref.
2011	Eko Fresh	Köln Kalk Ehrenmord	Director and editor	
2012	Kollegah und Farid Bang	Dynamit	Director and editor	
2013	Bushido	Leben und Tod des Kenneth Glöckler	Director and editor	
2013	Eko Fresh	Quotentürke	Director and editor	
2014	Kollegah	Du bist Boss	Director	
2015	Alligatoah	Lass liegen	Director and editor	
2016	Farid Bang	100 Bars	Director and editor	
2016	Kollegah	Pharao	Director and editor	
2016	Kollegah und MoTrip	Einer von Millionen	Director and editor	
2017	Kurdo	Ya Salam	Director	
2017	RedOne, Daddy Yankee und French Montana	Boom Boom	Director, DOP and editor	
2017	Spongebozz	Yellow Bar Mitzvah	Director, DOP and editor	
2017	Trailerpark	Sterben kannst du überall	Director, DOP and editor	
2018	RedOne, Adelina und NowUnited	One World	Director, DOP and editor	
2018	Sun Diego	Rock me Amadeus	Director, DOP and editor	

=== Documentations ===
Release	Titel	Description	Jobs	Ref.
2016	Kollegahs Trip to Ramallah	Documentation about Palestine for the Youtube-channel Bosshaft TV	Editor	

=== Short films ===
Release	Title	Actors	Jobs	Ref.
2007	Non ci stai! (Da steckste nich drin!)	Daniele Garraffo, Birte Alexander, Piet Klocke and Lisa Loch	Editor	
2007	Topfschlagen	Daniel Zlotin, Ernst-Gerd Klucken and Karina Klucken	Editor	
2008	Nachruf	Natascha Manthe and Christoph Türkay	Editor	
2009	0,1 Promille	Mirjam Druschel and Christoph Türkay	Editor	
2009	Das Geburtstagsgeschenk	Eko Fresh, Anne Wiesenberg, Uwe Helling and Turcuen Aslan	Director, DOP and editor	
2011	Blauer sucht Frau	Willi Herren, Indira Weis, Heino and Jürgen Drews	Director and editor	
2015	Ghettoveteran	Nikolai Will, Bernd Wöllmer, Mario Hoelsken and Milad Klein	Co-producer and DOP	

== Awards ==
Due to his collaboration on a variety of German hip-hop albums Zlotin has received thirteen gold records. Thus he was awarded for the albums Jung, brutal, gutaussehend 2 of Kollegah and Farid Bang, King and Imperator of Kollegah, Killa of Farid Bang, Sonny Black of Bushido, Musik ist keine Lösung of Alligatoah and Abstand of KC rebel as well as the singles Trauerfeierleid and Du bist schön of Alligatoah, Bleib in der Schule of Trailerpark, Ya Salam by Kurdo and iPhone 17 and Fata Morgana by KC Rebel.
