= Gio (rapper) =

German rapper and live streamer

Twitch information
- Channel: giorap90

YouTube information
- Channel: GioTV90

Giovanni Gartner (born 24 April 1990), known professionally as Gio, is a German rapper, live streamer, content creator and former battle rapper from Berlin.

== Career ==
=== Beginnings ===
Gio grew up without a father, his mother received Arbeitslosengeld II, a type of social aid. In April 2006 he created his YouTube channel Giovannio. There he initially posted personal songs about topics such as love. Laut.de described these songs as "deep heartbreak lyrics". Gio then switched to battle rap and took part in the Videobattleturnier (also known as VBT), a German rap tournament. In his first VBT in 2011 he reached the 1/64th round. He took part in the VBT 2012 again and caused a stir by defeating the rapper ÉSMaticx in the 1/64th round. The video gathered over two million views on YouTube and made Gio famous.

=== Battle Rap Era ===
His final breakthrough was his participation in the JuliensBlogBattle, another German rap tournament. In 2013, he made it to the finals, where he lost to SpongeBOZZ. A beef arose between Gio and SpongeBOZZ because SpongeBOZZ showed faked photos of Gio that implied him being a Nazi. In 2014, Gio won the JBB, but lost to SpongeBOZZ in the King finale. Gio did not submit a rematch, but gave up when SpongeBOZZ submitted a 34-minute battle round that was viewed over 25 million times. At the end of the 34-minute battle round, SpongeBOZZ also accused Gio of pedophilia and sexual abuse. Gio received a particularly negative response and threats to these accusations, which were only made up for the battle. Gio spoke to SpongeBOZZ and Julien, the organizer of the JuliensBlogBattle, whereupon SpongeBOZZ revised his statements and offered him a joint rap part in a mammoth remix. On the joint part in the Mammoth remix they called themselves God (SpongeBOZZ) and King (Gio) of Battle. Gio won the 2015 King Finale against EnteTainment.

Gio's biggest success in terms of YouTube clicks was the diss track "Kein Rapper" (German for "Not a rapper"), uploaded in May 2015, in which Gio criticizes the commercial and soulless style of LionT and Dagi Bee. "Kein Rapper" has been viewed 8.5 million times so far and triggered a wave of further diss tracks against LionT, for example from 4tune. There was also a conflict between Gio and KC Rebell because he was working with Dagi Bee. LionT could not react adequately to the diss and his public image was permanently damaged.

=== After the Battle Rap Era ===
At the end of 2016, Gio announced the end of his battle rap career. He now wanted to turn to more emotional and personal lyrics: "I don't feel like dissing a few idiots just so that a few million people might click here, because what's the point if kids see me here if I don't ultimately stand behind it." On his album "Zahltag" (German for "pay day"), which was released in March 2017 after several postponements of the release date, there is a lot of deeper lyrics to be heard. "Zahltag" charted in Germany at number 46.

Gio has been streaming regularly on Twitch since 2016.

== Discography ==
=== Studio albums ===
- Zahltag (2017)
- Quran (2017)

=== Songs ===
- Ich bin weg (2012)
- Schau nicht weg (2012)
- Das bin alles ich (2012)
- Scheiß drauf (feat. Das W., 2012)
- Bis zum Ende (feat. Jay-Soul, 2012)
- Raus hier (feat. Maylen & KOK, 2012)
- Weit weg (2012)
- Ein richtiger Rapper (2012)
- Gemeinsam einsam (2012)
- Kein Glauben (2012)
- Auf einmal (feat. Maylen, 2012)
- Liebe ist... (feat. Maylen, 2012)
- Das letzte Kapitel (2013)
- Du Versager (2013)
- Das Leben auf dem Klo des Kenneth Glöckler (2013)
- Gelernt damit zu leben (2014)
- Wir leben für den Scheiß! (feat. Casa, 2014)
- Einstecken (feat. Herr Kuchen, 2014)
- Vielleicht (2014)
- King Gio (2015)
- 100.000 Abonnenten (FREESONG, 2015)
- Kein Rapper (2015)
- YouTube Apokalypse (feat. Jaspa, 2017)
- Frei (2017)
- Ich mach was ich will (2017)
- Outro (2017)
- Silversjaren fun Diss (2018)
- Kein Interesse (2018)
- Was weißt du schon? (2018)
- Wie immer (2018)
- Ich lass los (2018)
- Gio, rap ma (2018)
- Alles gut (prod. by Sytros, 2019)
- Weitermachen (2019)
- R.I.P (2019)
- Plastik (Prod. by Emde51, 2020)
- Unikat (2020)
- Mama (Prod. by Bonzvy, 2020)
- Legenden (SpongeBOZZ, Gio & GReeeN feat. Der Asiate, Deamon & Johnny Diggson, 2022; No. 11 in the German single-trend charts on 8 April 2022)
- Panik (Prod. by Yeno, 2023)
