= Sun Diego =

German rapper

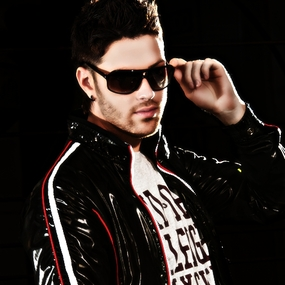
- Sun Diego in 2011
- Born: Dmitrij Aleksandrovic Chpakov; March 17, 1989 (age 37); Czernowitz, Ukrainian SSR
- Other names: Capri_Sonne; SpongeBOZZ; Sunny
- Occupations: Rapper; songwriter; record producer; record executive
- Years active: 2004–present
- Musical career
- Origin: Osnabrück, NRW, Germany
- Genres: Rap, gangster rap, battle rap
- Label: Bikini Bottom Mafia
- Member of: Bikini Bottom Mafia
- Formerly of: Moneyrain Entertainment

Sun Diego (born 17 March 1989 in Czernowitz, Ukraine SSR, USSR (now Ukraine); real name Dmitrij Aleksandrovic Chpakov), also referred to as Sunny, is a German rapper of Ukrainian-Jewish origin from Osnabrück. He is known primarily through his activities as a battle rap artist under the formerly anonymous alias of SpongeBOZZ, a gangster rap parody of SpongeBob SquarePants. Since 2017, Chpakov primarily performs under the stage name Sun Diego using his natural voice instead of performing as SpongeBOZZ.

== Life ==
=== Childhood and youth ===
Dmitrij Aleksandrovic Chpakov was born on 17 March 1989 in Czernowitz which at that time was still part of the Ukrainian SSR. His mother was a professional musician, and according to Chpakov, his father was an alcoholic whom he never met. In 1992, his mother moved to Germany from Ukraine for personal reasons and because of the Chernobyl disaster, taking him and his grandmother with her. Initially, they went to Berlin but later moved to a refugee shelter in Osnabrück. According to his autobiography, they moved to Osnabrück-Eversburg in 1993 after his mother started a relationship with a former Yugoslavian military officer who was also involved in dealing drugs. According to his own statements, the relationship was marked by violence. Chpakov claims that as a result, he got involved in criminal activities. He describes how, after dropping out of school, he committed large-scale cellphone fraud and identity theft together with a youth gang.

=== Beginning of rap career ===
In December 2004, Chpakov participated in his first rap battle on the website Reimliga Battle Arena (RBA) under the name "Capri_Sonne," which was not scored. He participated in 20 battles in RBA, winning 9 of them. In July 2008, Chpakov and John Webber founded the music label Moneyrain Entertainment. They both released the EP Ruski Tape in the same year, which brought them some minor recognition. The rapper Kollegah, with whom Chpakov claimed to have had an online friendship due to both participating in RBA, featured him on the second sampler from Selfmade Records, Chronik 2 (2009). Sun Diego was a guest feature on the song G's sterben jung. In December of the same year, he again took a guest part on Kollegah's Zuhältertape Volume 3. The recordings for Bossaura took place in Sun Diego's hometown of Osnabrück. Before that, he and Kollegah had set up a joint studio.

=== As SpongeBOZZ ===
Sun Diego first appeared as SpongeBOZZ in March 2013. He participated in the "JuliensBlogBattle" (JBB) rap competition and won both the 2013 competition and the "King-Finale" in 2013 against the previous year's winner 4tune, as well as the "King-Finale" in 2014 against the JBB 2014 winner Gio. Sun Diego's contribution to the JBB King-Finale 2014 against Gio, which consisted of an almost 35-minute diss track, received considerable attention. In November 2014, Chpakov announced his first studio album, Planktonweed Tape. The album was initially supposed to be released on 20 March, but the release date was postponed to 17 April 2015. He stated that he had to pause recordings for health reasons. Planktonweed Tape was eventually released on 17 April 2015, through his own label Bikini Bottom Mafia. On 28 April 2015, GfK Entertainment announced that Planktonweed Tape had entered the German charts at number one. Two days later, Chpakov announced that the album was to be indexed by the Federal Review Board for Media Harmful to Minors due to the song A.C.A.B. (an acronym for All Cops Are Bastards). The indexing became legally binding on September 30, 2015.

On 9 January 2017, Chpakov released the double single Started from the Bottom/Apocalyptic Infinity and announced his second studio album, Started from the Bottom/KrabbenKoke Tape, which was eventually released on 9 June 2017, and reached number 2 on the German charts. He also confirmed the rumors that the persona SpongeBOZZ was Sun Diego.

=== After SpongeBOZZ ===
In October 2017, his private apartment and recording studio were searched at the behest of the German customs and tax authorities due to Chpakov having not filed a tax return for years. During the raid, drugs and weapons were discovered, among other things.

In January 2018, Chpakov announced his autobiography Yellow Bar Mitzvah – The Seven Gates from Moloch to Fame, which he co-wrote with the editor Dennis Sand and published at the end of February 2018. To promote the book, he held signing sessions in Berlin, Cologne, Munich, Stuttgart, and Dortmund. The book reached number 2 on the Spiegel bestseller list for non-fiction (hardcover) and remained in the top 50 for a total of nine weeks.

In April 2018, he released the song Eloah, which entered the top ten of the German single charts, being his first song under the name Sun Diego to reach the charts. This was followed by a cover of Rock Me Amadeus, which released at number 71 on the charts. The song is a re-interpretation of the song by Falco from the hip-hop compilation Sterben um zu leben, a tribute album to the Austrian musician. On 22 June 2018, his solo single Hookah Kartell was released, reaching number 59.

On 29 June 2018, Juri released his first album Bratans aus Favelas through Chpakov's label Bikini Bottom Mafia. Chpakov is featured on several songs on the album. Part 2 followed on 24 July 2020, in which he was also featured on two songs.

On 9 June 2021, a new album titled Yellow Bar Mitzvah was announced on YouTube and Instagram. Rostov on Don and Apocalyptic Endgame, the first two songs of the album were released early on 19 November 2021 instead of in April 2022. For these two songs, a joint 33-minute music video was shot under the direction of Daniel Zlotin, which, with production costs of around 200,000 euros, is considered the most expensive music video in German rap history.

The album Yellow Bar Mitzvah was released on 22 April 2022, and reached number one on the German album charts.

== Identity ==
During his initial career as a battle rapper, SpongeBOZZ was an anonymous alias and the fact that it was Sun Diego was unknown. There was speculation about who SpongeBOZZ actually was. Names such as Kollegah, Sebastian Novak, Peter Fokin, BattleBoi Basti, and Sun Diego were suggested as possible identities. The latter theory was supported by the fact that there were many technical similarities in the rap styles of Sun Diego and SpongeBOZZ. Additionally, since SpongeBOZZ became popular, Sun Diego no longer appeared in public, and his Facebook page was removed. This theory was also supported by Kollegah, who stated in the magazine Juice "I know SpongeBOZZ too. We once made an album together, 'Bossaura.' [...] What I find stupid is that he doesn't just say: 'Okay, it's me, Sun Diego.'" Kollegah repeated his statement about SpongeBOZZ's identity on his album Zuhältertape Vol. 4 in the track Genozid.

The rapper John Webber, who had collaborated with Sun Diego in the past, also accused Sun Diego of being SpongeBOZZ and released a diss track against him.

There was also a hypothesis that SpongeBOZZ and his frequent rap partner Patrick Bang were the same person. This was later only partially confirmed by Sun Diego in his autobiography. He would rap the lyrics himself, but the costume was worn by a long-time friend of his.

The single Started from the Bottom/Apocalyptic Infinity from his 2017 album Started from the Bottom/KrabbenKoke Tape indirectly confirmed that SpongeBOZZ is Sun Diego, as he raps the last part of the single with his natural voice and responds to Kollegah, who had previously dissed him. In this double song, he also talks about his career from Sun Diego's perspective and his influence on German hip-hop, which further reinforced the hypothesis that SpongeBOZZ and Sun Diego are the same person. Another diss track titled Napoleon Komplex against PA Sports was released in May 2017, where he again responded to PA Sports' statements against Sun Diego. The titles of these songs included the heading "Payback #forsundiego," leaving no doubt about his identity. He also gave interviews in which he spoke as Sun Diego about SpongeBOZZ.

== Image and style ==
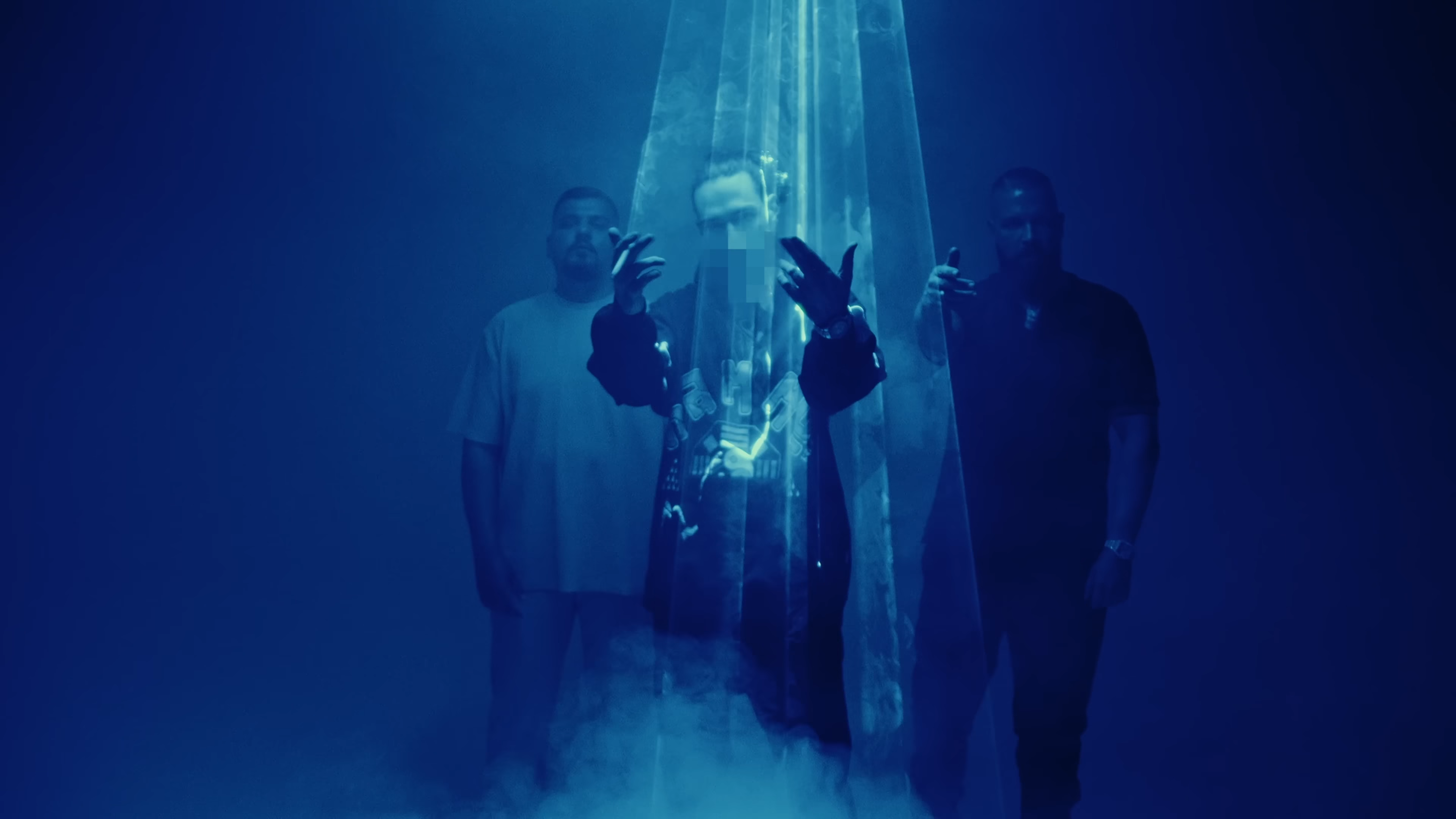
Sun Diego (center) with Juri (left) and Kollegah in 2022

Dennis Sand described the rapper in a Welt article as one of the most popular internet phenomena on YouTube, partly due to the rapper's costume. In his music videos, SpongeBOZZ wears a SpongeBob costume with sewn-on sunglasses and frequently references the TV series in his lyrics. These references are often mixed with rapper jargon (e.g., Planktonweed [Plankton weed] or Krabbenkoke [Krab cocaine]). The voice is also a characteristic of SpongeBOZZ, as it is modeled after the SpongeBob's voice from the German version of the series. The appearance of his BBM (Bikini Bottom Mafia) colleague Patrick Bang (a nod to Patrick Star and Farid Bang) is also an allusion to the children's series. Since the music video "Started from the Bottom" in January 2017, SpongeBOZZ no longer always alters his voice and often raps with his natural voice. He also no longer constantly wears his costume but frequently replaces it with a yellow bandana with various patterns.

Other characteristics of SpongeBOZZ's rap style, according to N24, include the use of "multi-syllabic rhyme chains, precise punchlines, an accurate flow variation," and the use of "clean tripletimes."

== Discography ==
=== Albums ===
Year	Title	Chart		
Year	Title	GER	AUT	SWI
2012	Soldiers Edition (with John Webber)	–	–	–
2015	Planktonweed Tape (as SpongeBOZZ)	1	1	3
2017	Started from the Bottom / KrabbenKoke Tape (as SpongeBOZZ)	2	2	3
2022	Yellow Bar Mitzvah	1	3	3

=== EPs ===
- Ruski Tape (2008)
- Moneyrain Entertainment Vol. 1 (2012)
- Battlerunden JBB2013 (2013)
- Battlerunden JBB2014 (2014)
- Planktonweed EP (2022)
- Drilla in Manila EP (2022)

=== Singles ===
Year	Title	Chart		
Year	Title	GER	AUT	SWI
2017	"A.C.A.B. II" (as SpongeBOZZ)	93	70	–
2017	"Yellow Bar Mitzvah" (as SpongeBOZZ)	78	59	–
2017	"Fame/BBM ist die Gang" (with Johnny Diggson, Deamon, Scenzah, and Juri)	–	74	–
2018	"Eloah"	6	5	59
2018	"Rock Me Amadeus"	71	63	–
2018	"Hookah Cartel"	59	53	–
2018	"Bella ciao" (with Scenzah, and Juri)	62	65	–
2019	"Keller oder Cockschelle" (with Mois)	72	–	–
2020	"Death Row" (Juri feat. Sun Diego)	57	73	–
2020	"Red Bottoms" (Juri feat. Sun Diego, Scenzah, and Mavie)	–	–	–
2021	"Apocalyptic Endgame" (as Sun Diego and SpongeBOZZ)	–	–	–
2021	"Rostov on Don" (as Sun Diego and SpongeBOZZ)	–	–	–
2021	"Rotlichtmassaker 2" (Kollegah feat. Sun Diego)	–	44	63
2022	"La Familia 2" (as Sun Diego and SpongeBOZZ)	98	–	–
2022	"A.C.A.B. III" (as SpongeBOZZ)	–	–	–
2022	"Ha-Satan"	84	–	–
2022	"Legenden" (as SpongeBOZZ; with GReeeN and Gio; feat Der Asiate, Deamon, and Johnny Diggson)	–	–	–
2022	"Schwarz Rot Gold" (feat. Farid Bang and Kollegah)	59	–	–
2022	"Home Invade" (Juri feat. Sun Diego and Kollegah)	–	–	–

== Bibliography ==
- Sun Diego, Dennis Sand: Yellow Bar Mitzvah: Die sieben Pforten vom Moloch zum Ruhm. riva Verlag, Munich 2018, ISBN 978-3-7423-0571-8.
