= Ku'damm 56 =

2016 German television miniseries

- Created by: Annette Hess
- Starring: Sonja Gerhardt; Claudia Michelsen; Maria Ehrich; Emilia Schüle
- Composer: Maurus Ronner
- Country of origin: Germany
- Original language: German
- No. of episodes: 3

Production
- Producers: Benjamin Benedict; Marc Lepetit; Nico Hofmann
- Production companies: UFA Fiction; ZDF Enterprises

Original release
- Network: ZDF
- Release: 20 March 2016

Ku’damm 56 is a German television miniseries (three-part drama) set in West Berlin in 1956. It follows a conservative dance-school owner and her three adult daughters as post-war social change and unresolved personal histories disrupt their lives.

It first aired on ZDF on 20, 21 and 23 March 2016. The miniseries was nominated for the Grimme-Preis in 2017.

Ku’damm 56 was followed by sequel miniseries Ku'damm 59 (2018), Ku'damm 63 (2021) and Ku’damm 77 (2026).

== Plot ==
In West Berlin in 1956, Caterina Schöllack runs the family dance and etiquette school on the Kurfürstendamm. Determined to secure social status, she pressures her three daughters—Helga, Monika and Eva—toward advantageous marriages and strict conformity.

Helga, the eldest, prepares to marry the lawyer Wolfgang von Boost, but their relationship becomes strained as expectations and secrets undermine their attempt at a respectable life. Monika, who excels at dancing but is treated as a disappointment by her mother, is pushed toward Joachim Franck, the troubled son of a wealthy industrialist; she also becomes involved in the new rock ’n’ roll scene through the musician Freddy Donath. Eva, a nurse, plans for security by pursuing marriage to her older superior, Professor Fassbender, but develops feelings for Rudi Hauer, a married man.

As the sisters pursue different paths, conflicts over reputation, class and control intensify. The family’s carefully maintained image is further threatened by revelations connected to Caterina’s past and the origins of the dance school. The trilogy follows the daughters’ attempts to make independent choices while Caterina fights to preserve her authority and social standing.

== Cast ==
- Sonja Gerhardt as Monika Schöllack
- Claudia Michelsen as Caterina Schöllack
- Maria Ehrich as Helga Schöllack
- Emilia Schüle as Eva Schöllack

== Background ==
According to ZDF, the miniseries portrays the tensions faced by young women in post-war West Germany between social expectations and personal self-determination. ZDF editor-in-chief Heike Hempel described Ku’damm 56 as focusing on women’s paths toward self-determined sexuality and equal rights.

== Production ==
The film was shot in Berlin from July to October 2015. Filming locations included Rudolph Wilde Park, Haus Dannenberg in Heiligensee, sites along the Havel, and other Berlin locations; interior scenes were shot at UFA studios on the Tempelhofer Feld.

== Stage adaptation ==
A stage musical based on the miniseries premiered in November 2021 at the Theater des Westens in Berlin.

== Accolades ==
- Grimme-Preis (nominated), 2017
