= Xatar =

Kurdish-German rapper (1981–2025)

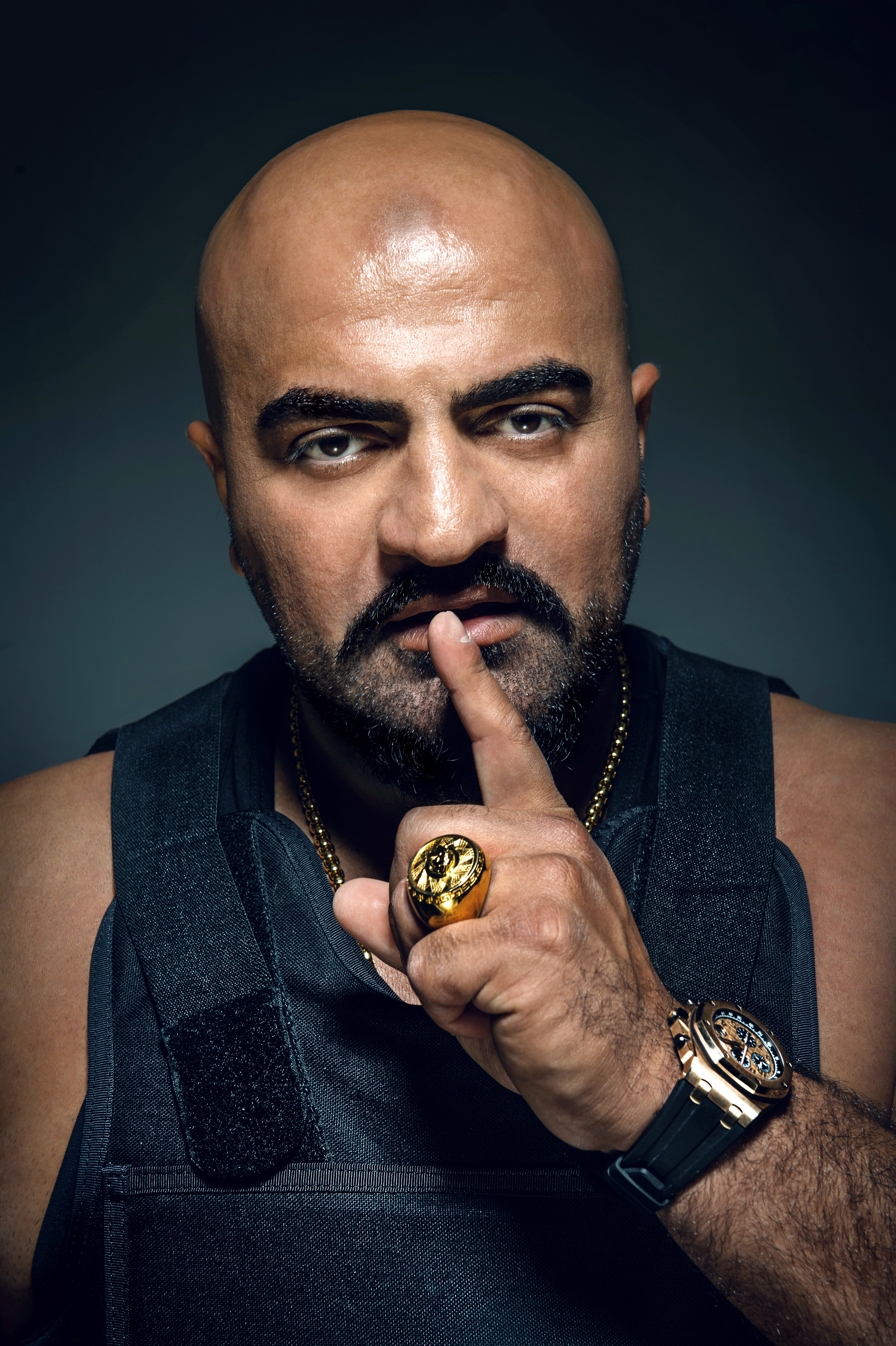
- Xatar in 2018
- Born: Giwar Hajabi; 24 December 1981; Sanandaj, Kurdistan Region, Iran
- Died: 8 May 2025 (aged 43); Cologne, North Rhine-Westphalia, Germany
- Education: London Metropolitan University
- Occupations: Rapper; entrepreneur; songwriter; producer
- Musical career
- Genre: German hip hop
- Instruments: Vocals; piano
- Years active: 2007–2025
- Labels: Alles oder nix Records, Groove Attack TraX

Giwar Hajabi (Kurdish: ژیوار حاجبی, romanized: Jîwar Hacibî, Central Kurdish pronunciation: ['ʒiwɑːɾ ħɑː'dʒəbiː]; 24 December 1981 – 8 May 2025), better known by his stage name Xatar, was an Iranian Kurdish-German rapper and businessman. He was the founder and owner of the labels Alles oder Nix Records, Kopfticker Records, Groove Attack TraX and Goldmann Entertainment. He studied Music Business at the London Metropolitan University.

== Career ==
=== Youth ===
Xatar was born Giwar Hajabi to Kurdish parents in 1981 in Sanandaj, Iran. His father is the music professor Eghbal Hajabi. In the early 1980s, his parents fled with him to nearby Iraq. At this time, the first Gulf War broke out between the two Middle Eastern states. After Saddam Hussein's regime attacked the Kurdish minority in Iraq, his parents were also tortured and imprisoned. He himself was held prisoner for three months near Baghdad.

=== Musical and entrepreneurial career ===
==== Beginnings as a rapper and founding of Alles oder Nix Records ====
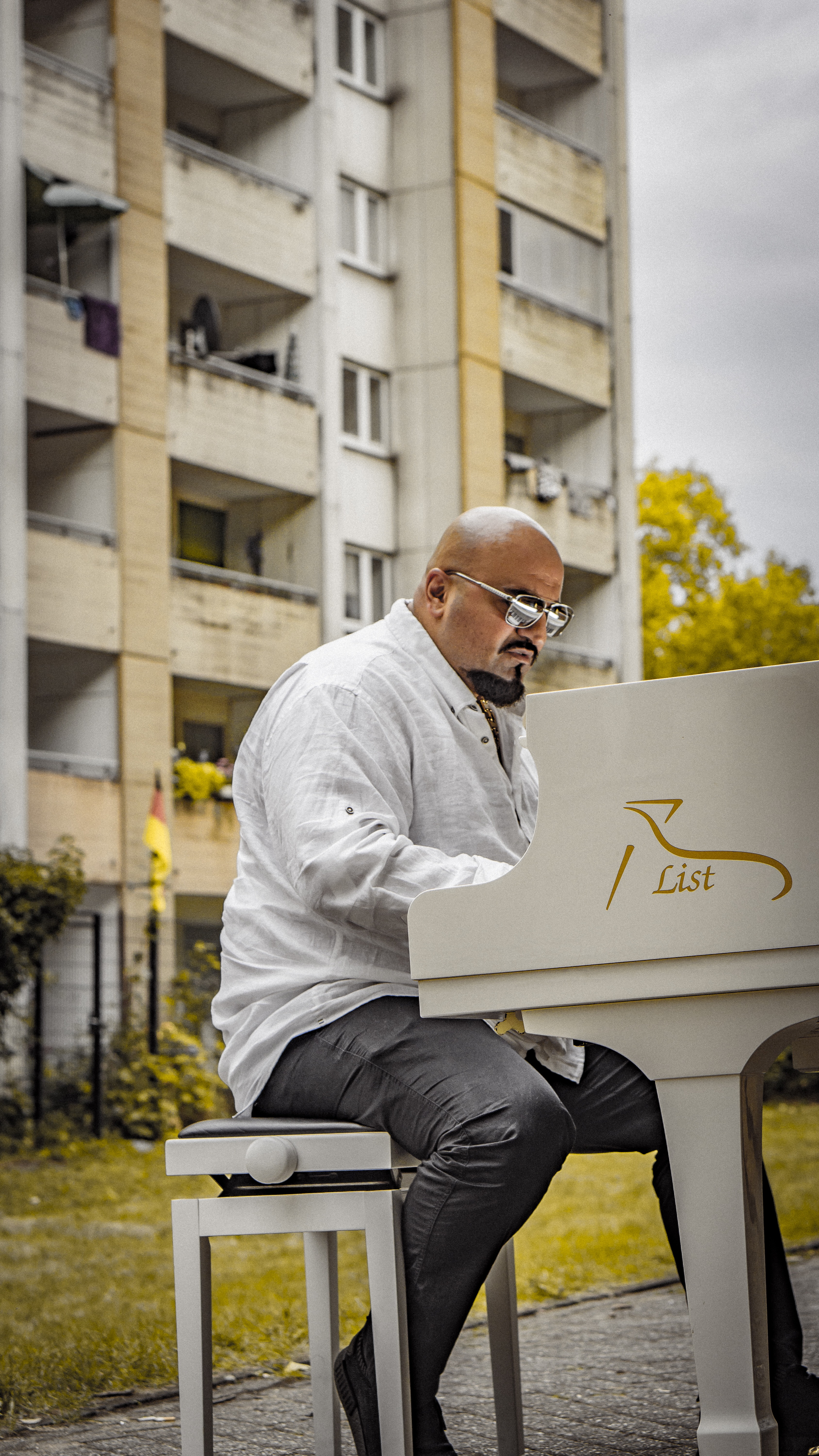
Xatar began playing the piano at the age of nine.

At the end of the 1990s, Hajabi began using the pseudonym Xatar, the Kurdish (Sorani) term for "danger", to rap and produce beats in the recording room of a youth center. In 2007 he founded the label Alles oder Nix Records, which signed a distribution contract with Groove Attack. The first artists he signed were Samy and SSIO. His first album, Alles oder nix was released at the end of November 2008. In addition to his label colleagues Samy and SSIO, it also features guest contributions from La Honda, Azad, Jetsett Mehmet, Jamila and Jalaal. Less than a year after its release, Xatar's debut album was indexed by the Bundesprüfstelle für jugendgefährdende Medien ("German Federal Review Board for Media Harmful to Minors").

In 2009, Xatar was involved in the robbery of a gold transport truck. He and three accomplices stole €1.7 million and fled to Iraq. The next year, he was extradited back to Germany and imprisoned. He continued to run Alles oder Nix Records from prison, signing the rapper Schwesta Ewa. He also worked on his second album, playing instrumentals on a smuggled mobile phone at night and rapping his lyrics into a voice recorder. He then sent the tapes by post to his label. The album was completed and supplemented by guest contributions from rappers such as Farid Bang, Nate57, Celo & Abdi, Capo and Eko Fresh and released on his label in April 2012. The album Nr. 415, named after his prisoner number, entered the German album charts at number 19. In Switzerland it reached number 23 and in Austria 52. Besides Nr. 415, Alles oder Nix Records also released the albums Spezial Material and BB.UM.SS.N by SSIO, Realität by Schwesta Ewa and Sechs Kronen by Kalim during Xatar's imprisonment.

==== Commercial breakthrough with Baba aller Babas and collaboration with Haftbefehl ====
One month after his release he released Schwesta Ewa's debut album Kurwa via his label. At the same time he started the production of his third album, for which he was again able to attract a number of well-known guests such as SSIO, Haftbefehl, Schwesta Ewa, Olexesh, Kalim, Samy and Teesy. In May 2015 Baba aller Babas came out and reached number 1 on the German charts. In Austria and Switzerland it reached number 3 respectively. In the same year Xatar, together with SSIO and two other friends, opened the Shisha bar Bar Noon in Cologne together with SSIO. On 12 October 2015, he published his autobiography Alles oder Nix: Bei uns sagt man, die Welt gehört dir through riva Verlag. Xatar presented the book at the Frankfurt Book Fair and on stern TV. He also founded Kopfticker Records, a second label for rappers who aren't stylistically suited to Alles oder Nix Records. The first artist was Plusmacher with his album Ernte.

At the beginning of 2016, Xatar performed in Berlin's Columbia Halle as part of the benefit campaign The Voice Of The Voiceless. Azad, SSIO, Schwesta Ewa, Haftbefehl and the 187 Strassenbande also took part in the event organised by the non-profit organisation Our Bridge to fund an orphanage in northern Iraq. In the same year, Xatars main label Alles oder Nix Records released the albums 0,9, with which SSIO was able to reach Number 1 in the charts for the first time, and Odyssee 579 by Kalim. In May 2016, Xatar and Haftbefehl announced their joint album Der Holland Job with a promotion campaign as part of the television show Studio Amani and the subsequent removal of their social media profiles. The Berlin label Four Music released it on 12 August 2016. The collaborative album occupied No. 1 in the charts in Germany, Austria and Switzerland.

==== Expansion of entrepreneurial fields and contract with Universal Music ====
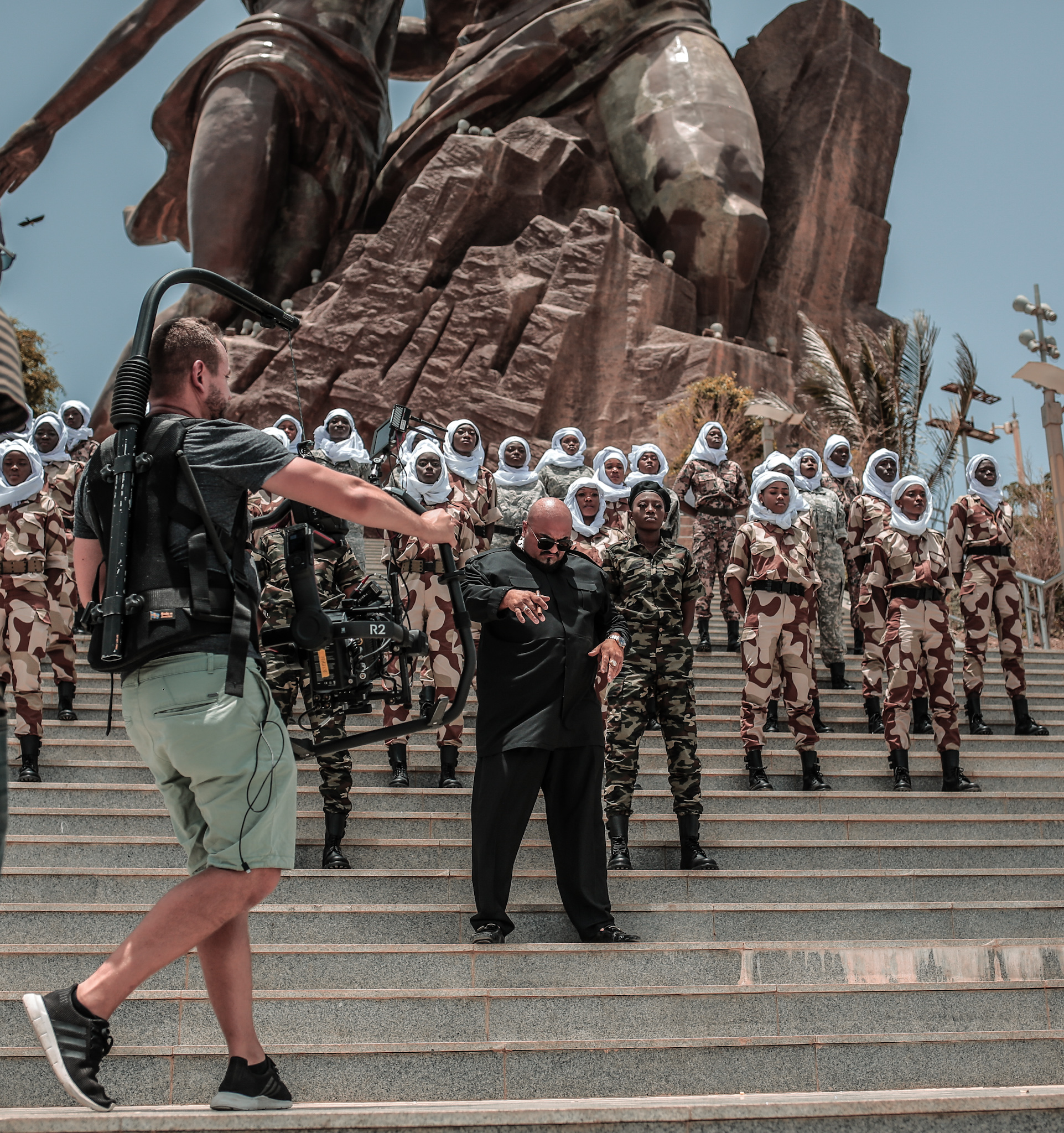
Daniel Zlotin (left) and Xatar filming the video for Gaddafi

In 2017, the albums Shäms by Samy and Thronfolger by Kalim appeared through Alles oder Nix Records, as did Xalaz by Eno, Entre 2 Mondes by Yonii, Kush Hunter by Plusmacher, Der letzte weisse König by Sylabil Spill and Favela by Levo through Kopfticker Records. In November Xatar dissolved his second label, causing the rappers Eno, Yonii, Sylabil Spill, Ajé, Joao Michel Diau, Dollar Euro Yen and Levo to lose their contracts. At the same time he announced the founding of the platform PUSH, where artists can present themselves. From 100,000 clicks on, they were to be given the opportunity to publish an album.

In the same year, Xatar started to expand his activities away from the music industry. In cooperation with Golden Pipe he founded the shisha tobacco brand Orijinal. He also started to work as a fashion and jewellery designer with the company Massari. For the brand he cooperated with DefShop. Xatar was commissioned to compile a sampler for the German gangster movie Nur Gott kann mich richten with Moritz Bleibtreu, produced by Özgür Yıldırım. It was released in January 2018 by the Warner Music Group. The sampler featured artists such as Soufian, Lary, Disarstar, Luciano and Schwesta Ewa. Xatar also appeared in a small role in the accompanying drama. He also had an acting role in the movie Familiye and the ZDFneo-sitcom Blockbustaz.

In March 2018, Xatar signed a contract with Universal Music Group, which has since taken over the distribution of his label's releases. On the occasion of the tenth anniversary of his debut album, his fourth solo album Alles oder Nix II was released in the September. The limited box edition also includes the rapper's debut album, reduced by the number of indexed tracks. Capital Bra, Azet, Schwesta Ewa, Samy, Eno and Nu51 are featured as guest rappers. Alles oder Nix II was the third album of the artist from Bonn to reach Number 1 in the charts. In addition to his own album, Eno, who was taken over by Alles oder Nix Records, released the album Wellritzstrasse. Schwesta Ewa and Samy also released albums, Aywa and Mann im Haus in 2018. Kalim's contract with the label expired in summer. He later signed an artist contract with Urban.

==== Founding of Groove Attack TraX, Haval Grill and Goldmann Entertainment ====
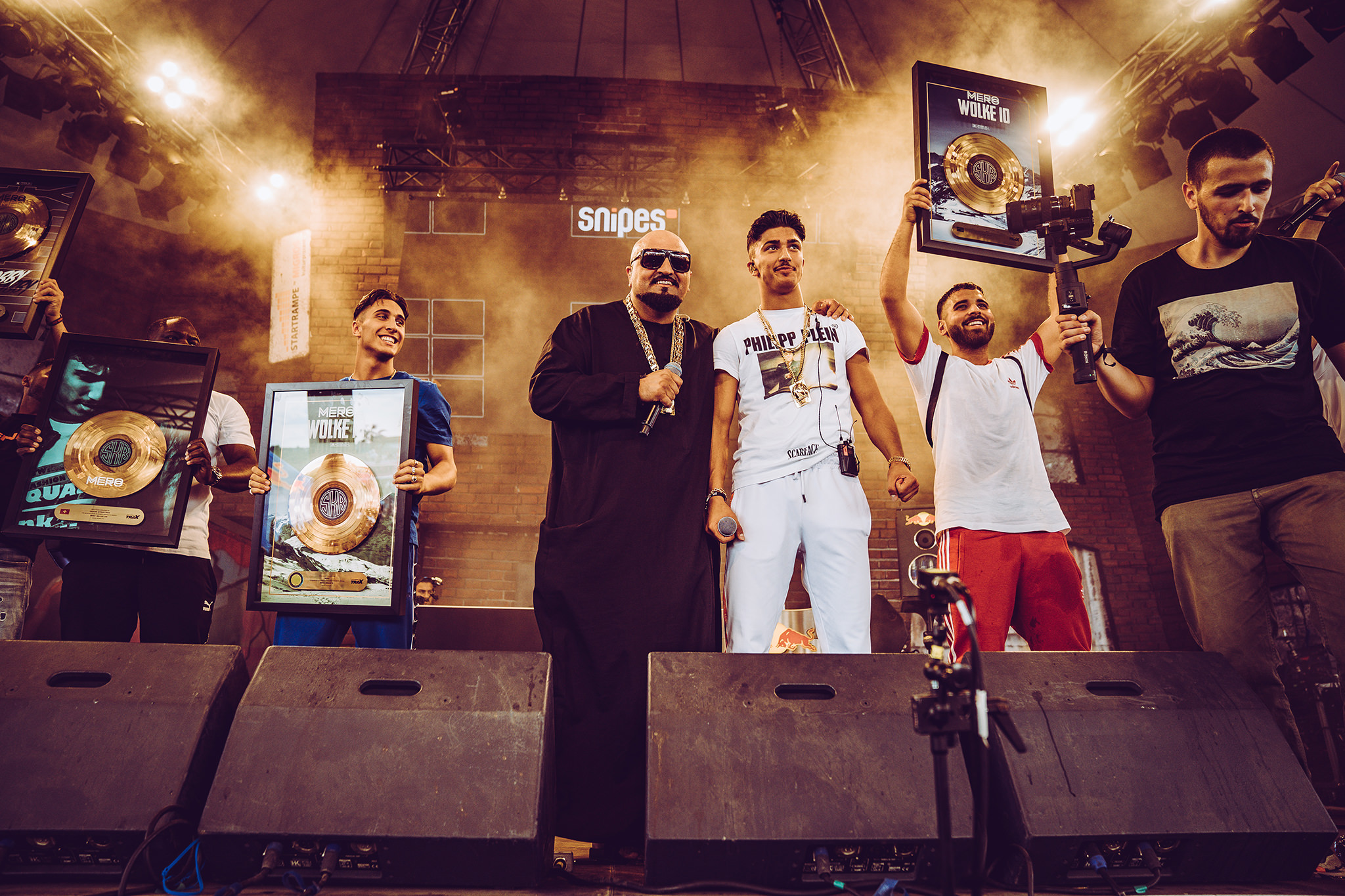
Xatar (center) with artists Sero El Mero (left) and Mero (right next to him)

At the end of the year Xatar founded the label Groove Attack TraX together with the distributor Groove Attack. Mero was the first artist to receive a contract. With his first three singles Baller los, Hobby Hobby and Wolke 10 as well as his album Ya Hero Ya Mero, which followed in March 2019, he reached number 1 in the German charts. Baller los also received gold records in Germany, Austria and Switzerland. This was followed in May 2019 by the release of Eno's album Fuchs by Alles oder Nix Records. The single release Ferrari with Mero occupied number 1 in Germany, Austria and Switzerland.

In May, the Y-Kollektiv published a documentary dealing with the manipulation of the number of downloads of streaming services and charts. The reporter Ilhan Coşkun interviewed a person appearing under the pseudonym Kai, who claimed to influence the charts on behalf of managers. He mentioned Mero and Sero el Mero, two young rappers associated with Xatar, whose numbers he said had been manipulated. The video resonated widely with the German rap scene. Xatar rejected the accusation that he had bought "fake streams". Groove Attack and Groove Attack TraX also declared that at no time did they buy clicks or make any other manipulation effort to artificially make artists famous. At the same time as the controversy Groove Attack TraX signed the Bremerhaven rapper Sero el Mero. The singles Ohne Sinn, Dein Fahrer, Nokia and Telefon were followed in mid-August by his album BabyFaceFlow.

With the Haval Grill Xatar entered the restaurant business in summer 2020. The fast food bar in Bonn, which specializes in kofta, was the first branch of a planned franchise for which he was looking for international licensees. Xatar also sold the products from his restaurant as frozen food. At the beginning of 2021, Xatar founded the independent label Goldmann Entertainment, with which he was going to promote international musicians. It was also announced that the German director Fatih Akin would film the rapper's life under the movie title Rheingold. The actor Emilio Sakraya was supposed to take on the leading role.

== Reception ==
=== Successes and awards ===
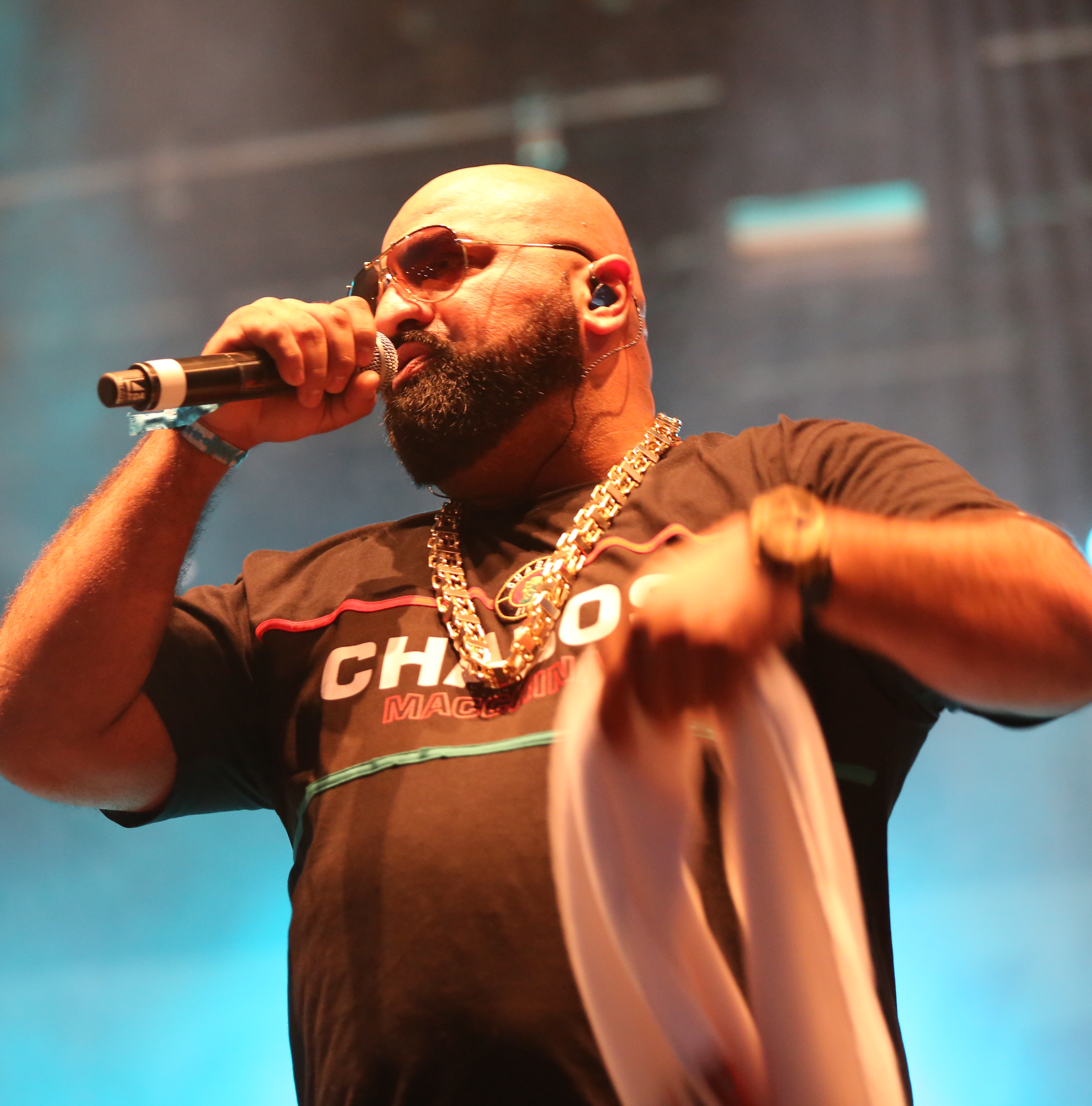
Xatar performing in 2016

Xatar celebrated his first successes as an artist in 2012. With his second album Nr. 415 he entered the top 20 of the album charts. Impala, the association of independent labels, presented him with the Silver Award for selling more than 20,000 copies of the album. Baba aller Babas marked the rapper's commercial breakthrough in 2015. The album sold over 70,000 copies, making it number 1 in the German charts. Impala awarded it Double Silver. The following albums released through the distribution channels of major labels, Der Holland Job and Alles oder Nix II, also reached number 1 in the charts. Xatar also received awards for other artistic genres. As an author, he reached the top of the Spiegel bestseller list of non-fiction books in 2015 with his autobiography Alles oder Nix: bei uns sagt man man, die Welt gehört dir. In the same year, he first directed music videos with Nullkommaneun and SIM-Karte by SSIO. At the Echo Music Prize in 2016 he received a nomination in the category Best Video National for the first-mentioned production.

At the same time as his personal commercial breakthrough, Xatar was also able to celebrate his first successes as label manager of Alles oder Nix Records. While Schwesta Ewa's debut album Kurwa received the Silver Award from Impala, SSIO achieved Double Silver with his albums BB.U.M.SS.N and 0,9. He achieved even higher sales and streaming figures with his company Groove Attack TraX at the end of 2018. The debut single of his first artist Mero already entered the German and Austrian single charts at number 1. The subsequent tracks Hobby Hobby and Wolke 10 also reached the top positions of both countries. In addition, Hobby Hobby achieved 2.1 million hits on the music streaming service Spotify on the day of its release. It is the most streamed title on a single day in Germany. The third single Wolke 10 reached 4.47 million hits on YouTube, in the first 24 hours, making it "the biggest German HipHop debut on YouTube" according to the video portal. With over 200,000 sales each, all three songs achieved gold status in Germany and Austria. Mero's first album Ya Hero Ya Mero climbed to position 1 in German-speaking countries in March 2019. The German-Kurdish rapper also achieved his first chart positions in the Netherlands and Belgium. Ferrari, a collaboration of Eno and Mero, also took first place in the charts of three countries.

At the Hiphop.de Awards, Xatar was honored in the "Maker of the Year" category in 2019 and 2020 and in the "Lifetime Achievement" category in 2022.

=== Criticism ===
For the tenth anniversary of Alles oder Nix Records Michael Rubach from Hiphop.de looked back on the development of Xatar and his label. The artists on the platform were initially inspired by the G-funk and Boo-Bap-Rap of the 90s. With their "no-frills street rap", they have set themselves apart from the "trends or stylistic twists of the time," which "had their roots above all in Berlin's underground and the boys from Düsseldorf with their powerful word play". In addition, Xatar used terms such as "Baba" "long before Haftbefehl and other Frankfurters of the generation after Azad had made the mixed-cultural slang mainstream-friendly". Dennis Sand on the other hand, assessed the beginnings more critically in a portrait of Xatar in 2015. Thus the Bonn artist "at that time still quite awkwardly verbalized his half imagined, half real street life on a soundtrack.

The e-zine laut.de focused on Xatar's music from the first album after his release. Baba aller Babas and Alles or Nix II each received three of a possible five rating points. Der Holland Job scored the best with four points. According to David Maurer, Xatar, who rolls "back into the game in an armored jeep like a mighty godfather dominating everything", embraces "a powerful aura". In terms of content, however, "even after a few runs" it became apparent that "the tracks about his life before, during and after prison don't have a particularly long half-life despite a good starting position". Nevertheless, the Bonn artist showed "that a good album doesn't necessarily require complex rhyme structures and intricate storytelling". Holger Grevenbrock praised the "dynamics of fast and slow parts" with regard to Der Holland Job, which "ensure a constant tension". While Xatar "rather mimes the classic gangster", who proclaims that "negotiating is a matter for the boss", Haftbefehl "is his completely over-excited sidekick à la Robert De Niro in Mean Streets." Alles oder Nix II is, according to Lukas Rauer, "trendier and more modern...breaking with the familiar AON-Kopfnicker sound". Although "strong lead tracks like 'Iz Da' or 'Original' are missing", Xatar shows his "reflective side" in the honest song Schwesterherz."

Xatar's 2015 autobiography received mixed reviews. Tobias Rapp of Spiegel praised Alles oder Nix: Bei uns sagt man, die Welt gehört dir. He said that the book was an "Entwicklungsroman of our time," which is "exciting and well told". With Xatar's autobiography, the wish that "as street intellectuals, rappers would tell about life in a larger country and a smaller world" has come true. Even if "some of it is due to exaggeration", the story of the rapper is "still crazy enough." Dani Fromm from laut.de had a less positive opinion of the non-fiction book. Xatar presents himself "as the lonely exception, the only real criminal among would-be bandits and scoundrels". Nevertheless, "from the first page there is an oversized question in the room" as to which part is true. Thus the "multiple sweeping talk of the 'truth, as it could have been'" continued to saw "at the credibility."

=== Controversies ===
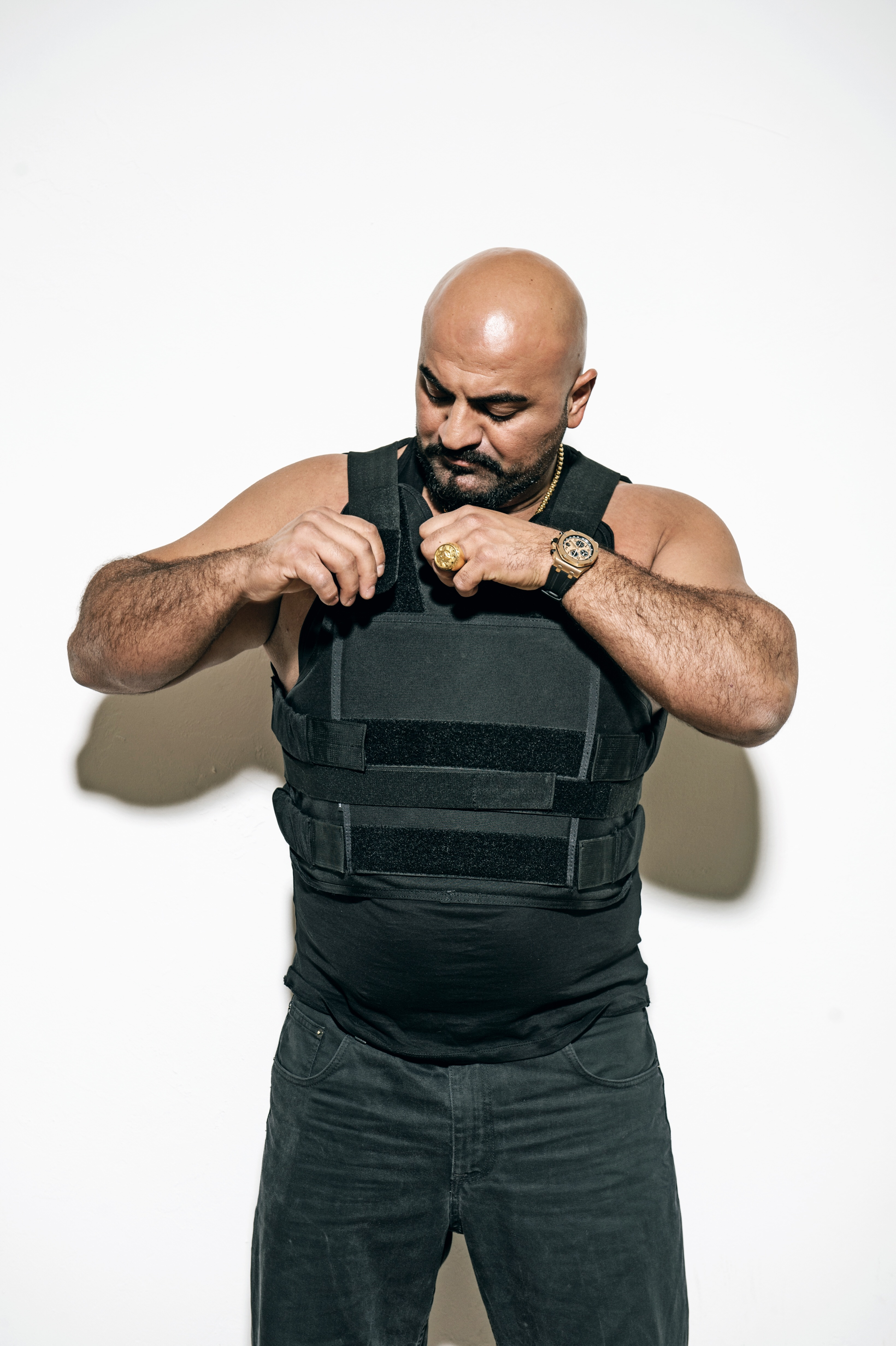
Xatar in 2018

Xatar's debut album earned him the accusation of endangering young people. Since 26 February 2010, Alles oder Nix has been on List A of the indexed media. With Platz ins Geschäft, Eine Geschichte 1, Skit, Guck wie dein Herz klopft, Lauf weg, §31 and B.O.X. seven songs were classified as "youth endangering" by the Federal Department for Media Harmful to Young Persons. The songs have a "brutal" effect and incite "violence". From the point of view of the Review Board, Xatar presents the "exercise of violence as worthy of imitation" and a "violent assertion of one's own interests as an alternativeless concept of action". Due to the I-perspective used, it acquires a "model character for young recipients". The "rather descriptive, partly socially critical texts of the other songs are not able to create an overall context that would be suitable to absorb the statements relevant to indexing and give them a different meaning."

In the summer of 2016, a man in front of Xatar's hookah lounge Bar Noon was attacked by several men. In addition to knife wounds, he also suffered a fractured skull. Since the men involved were associated with Xatar and the injured man with the musician KC Rebell, some tabloid media spoke of a "rapper war". There had been public disputes between the two hip-hop musicians some time before, after Xatar had claimed that KC Rebell had wanted to join Alles or Nix Records a year earlier. After the incident, the Cologne District Court issued an arrest warrant against Xatar for attempted manslaughter and assault. He surrendered on 23 August 2016, referring to having been on his way back from a Hanover festival at the time of the crime. The arrest warrant was ultimately lifted.

== Death ==
Xatar was found dead in his apartment in Cologne, Germany, on 8 May 2025. He was 43. After his death, it was revealed that he had suffered a stroke in 2021. Following the stroke, he had lost 50 kg (110 lbs) in order to improve his health. On May 15, he was buried in the Muslim section of Bonn's Nordfriedhof cemetery.

== Work ==
=== Discography ===
Studio albums

- 2008: Alles oder nix
- 2012: 415
- 2015: Baba aller Babas
- 2016: Der Holland Job (with Haftbefehl)
- 2018: Alles oder Nix II
- 2021: Hrrr

Soundtracks

- 2018: Nur Gott kann mich richten

EPs

- 2018: AGB 1
- 2018: AGB 2

Singles

- 2008: § 31
- 2012: Interpol.com
- 2015: Original
- 2015: Iz Da
- 2015: Mein Mantel
- 2016: 500 (with Haftbefehl)
- 2016: Ich zahle gar nix (with Haftbefehl)
- 2017: Status Qou
- 2018: Nur Gott kann mich richten (with Samy & Gringo)
- 2018: Balla (with Azet)
- 2018: Weiter Weg (with Nu)
- 2018: Gaddafi
- 2018: Schwesterherz
- 2020: Bayda (with Navid Zardi)

=== Filmography ===
- 2017: Nur Gott kann mich richten
- 2018: Blockbustaz
- 2018: Familiye
- 2022: Rheingold
- 2025: Babo- Die Haftbefehl Story

=== Books ===
- 2015: Alles oder Nix: Bei uns sagt man, die Welt gehört dir, Riva Verlag, Munich, ISBN 978-3-86883-755-1
