= Haftbefehl =

German rapper

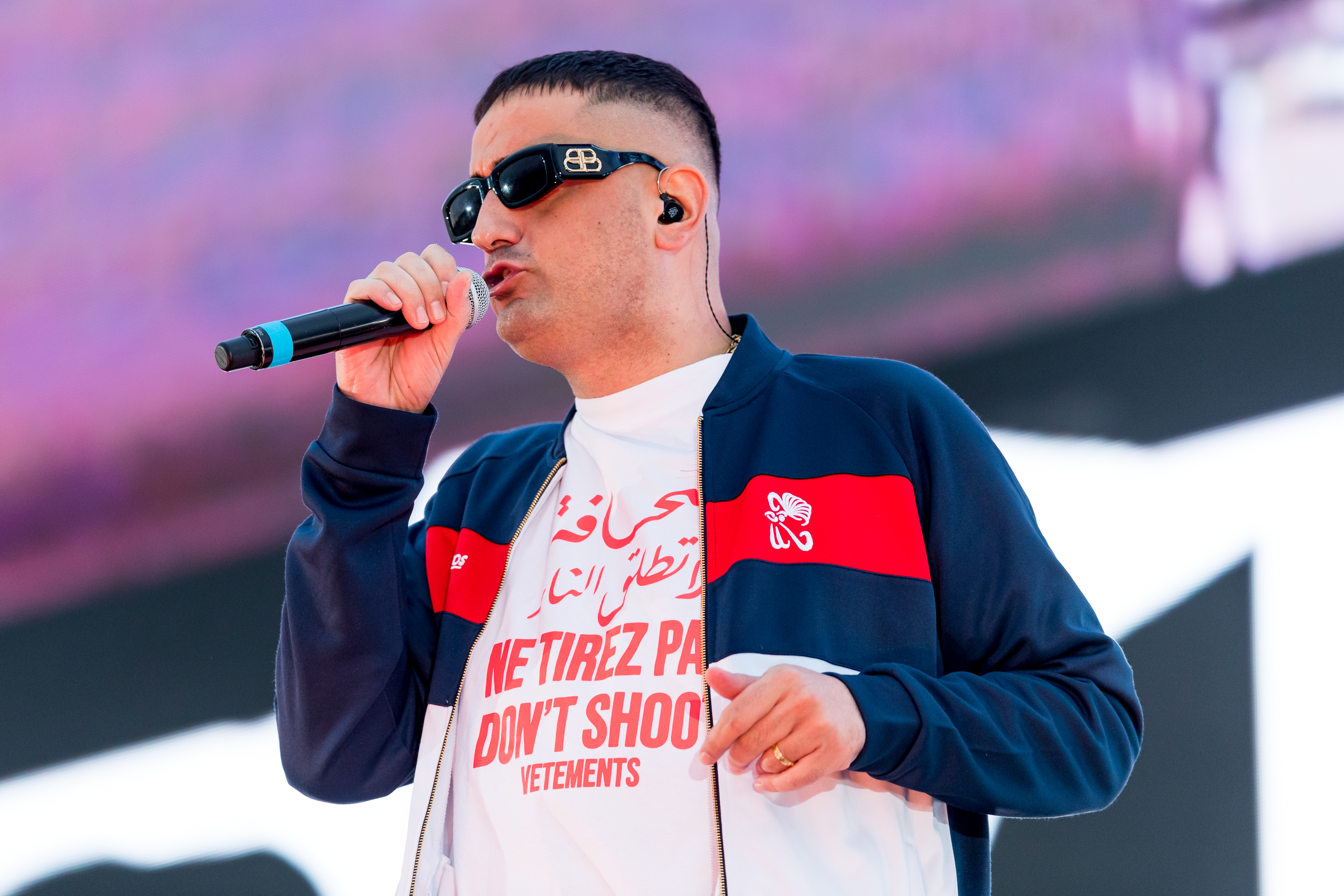
- Haftbefehl in 2020

Background information
- Born: Aykut Anhan; 16 December 1985 (age 40); Offenbach, Hessen, West Germany
- Origin: Turkish-Kurdish, Zaza
- Genres: Hip hop, trap, German rap
- Occupation: Rapper
- Years active: 2010-present

Aykut Anhan (born 16 December 1985), known by his stage name Haftbefehl (meaning "arrest warrant" in German), is a German rapper of Turkish-Kurdish origin. He is widely considered one of the greatest German hip-hop artists. Haftbefehl was signed to his own record label Azzlack, before signing with the label Echte Musik.

== Biography ==
Haftbefehl was born Aykut Anhan in Offenbach am Main, West Germany, on 16 December 1985 into a Turkish-speaking non-practicing Alevi Twelver Shi'a household, raised by a Turkish mother from Giresun and a Zaza Kurd father from Tunceli.

By Anhan's own account, he dropped out of school after his father's suicide which happened when he was 14. In 2006, he fled to Istanbul because of an impending imprisonment/arrest warrant (in German: "Haftbefehl", that's why his name) concerning drug trafficking; from there he moved to the Netherlands and lived in Amsterdam and Arnhem. Along the way he wrote his first lyrics. After his return to his hometown Offenbach, he began working as a vehicle mechanic. After three weeks he quit and subsequently began running a betting shop.

After that he started recording his first songs. When Samson Jones (better known as Jonesmann), the owner of the label Echte Musik, heard Haftbefehl's songs, he was assured of his skills and gave him a contract. Haftbefehl was involved with eight contributions at the sampler Kapitel 1: Zeit für was Echtes. He also gained attention by his contribution on the sampler La Connexion and on singles from fellow rappers Kollegah and Manuellsen.

On 29 October 2010, Haftbefehl released his first album called Azzlack Stereotyp, which reached 59 on MusicLine's Top 100 chart on 15 November 2010. After the closing of the label Echte Musik he launched his own label called Azzlacks.

In Spring 2012, Haftbefehl released his second album, Kanackiş, which contains songs with other famous German musicians like Jan Delay and Sido. On the 15th anniversary of the death of American rapper The Notorious B.I.G., the splash! magazine released a mixtape named The Notorious H.A.F.T.

With the single Chabos wissen wer der Babo ist, Haftbefehl entered the German single charts for the first time.

Haftbefehl married in 2016 and currently has two children. His younger brother is also a rapper, who goes under the moniker Capo. His older brother, Aytac, was sentenced to four years in prison for bank robbery in 2017. In October 2025, a Netflix documentary called "Babo: The Haftbefehl Story" was released.

== Discography ==
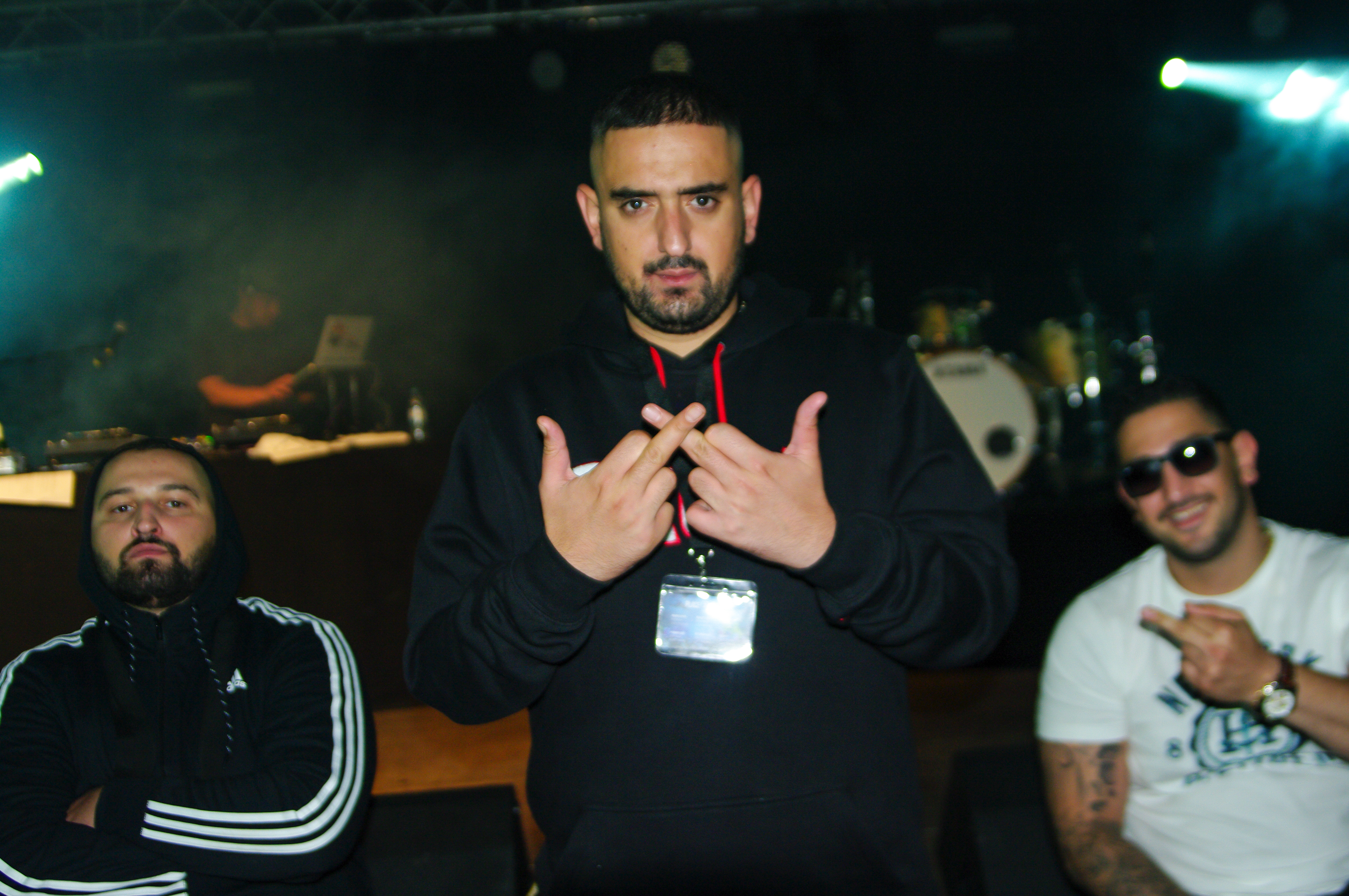
Haftbefehl (center) at Place2Be Festival, Germany, 2015

Albums

- Azzlack Stereotyp (2010)
- Kanackiş (2012)
- Blockplatin (2013)
- Russisch Roulette (2014)
- Unzensiert (2015)
- Der Holland Job with Xatar (2016)
- Das weisse Album (2020)
- Das schwarze Album (2021)
- Mainpark Baby (2022)

== Awards and nominations ==
=== Results ===
Year	Award	Nomination	Work	Result	Ref.
2010	HipHop.de Awards	Best Newcomer National	Himself	Won	
2010	HipHop.de Awards	Best Single National	"Gestern Gallus, heute Charts"	Nominated	
2010	HipHop.de Awards	Best Album National	"Azzlack Stereotyp"	Nominated	
2011	HipHop.de Awards	Best Collaboration	Himself (with Kollegah, Farid Bang)	Won	
2012	HipHop.de Awards	Best Free Release National	"The Notorious H.A.F.T."	Nominated	
2012	HipHop.de Awards	Best Video National	"Chabos wissen wer der Babo ist"	Nominated	
2012	HipHop.de Awards	Best Beat National	"Chabos wissen wer der Babo ist"	Nominated	
2012	HipHop.de Awards	Best Punchline	"Muck bloss nicht uff hier, du Rudi"	Won	
2014	HipHop.de Awards	Best Release National	"Russisch Roulette"	Won	
2014	HipHop.de Awards	Best Song National	"Ich Rolle Mit Meim Besten" (with Marteria)	Nominated	
2014	HipHop.de Awards	Best Video National	"Ihr H*rensöhne/Saudi Arabi Money Rich"	Won	
2014	HipHop.de Awards	Best Rap-Solo-Act National	Himself	Won	
2016	HipHop.de Awards	Best Release National	"Unzensiert"	Nominated	
2020	HipHop.de Awards	Lyricist of the Year	Himself	Nominated	
2020	HipHop.de Awards	Best Rap-Solo-Act National	Himself	Nominated	
2020	HipHop.de Awards	Best Album National	"Das weisse Album"	Nominated	
2021	HipHop.de Awards	Best Album National	"Das schwarze Album"	Won	
2021	HipHop.de Awards	Best Rap-Solo-Act National	Himself	Won	
2021	HipHop.de Awards	Best Song National	"Wieder am Block" (with Soufian)	Nominated	
2021	HipHop.de Awards	Best Video National	"Offen/Geschlossen"	Nominated	
2021	HipHop.de Awards	Beat of the Year	"Lebe Leben"	Nominated	
