= Sonja Gerhardt =

German actress (born 1989)

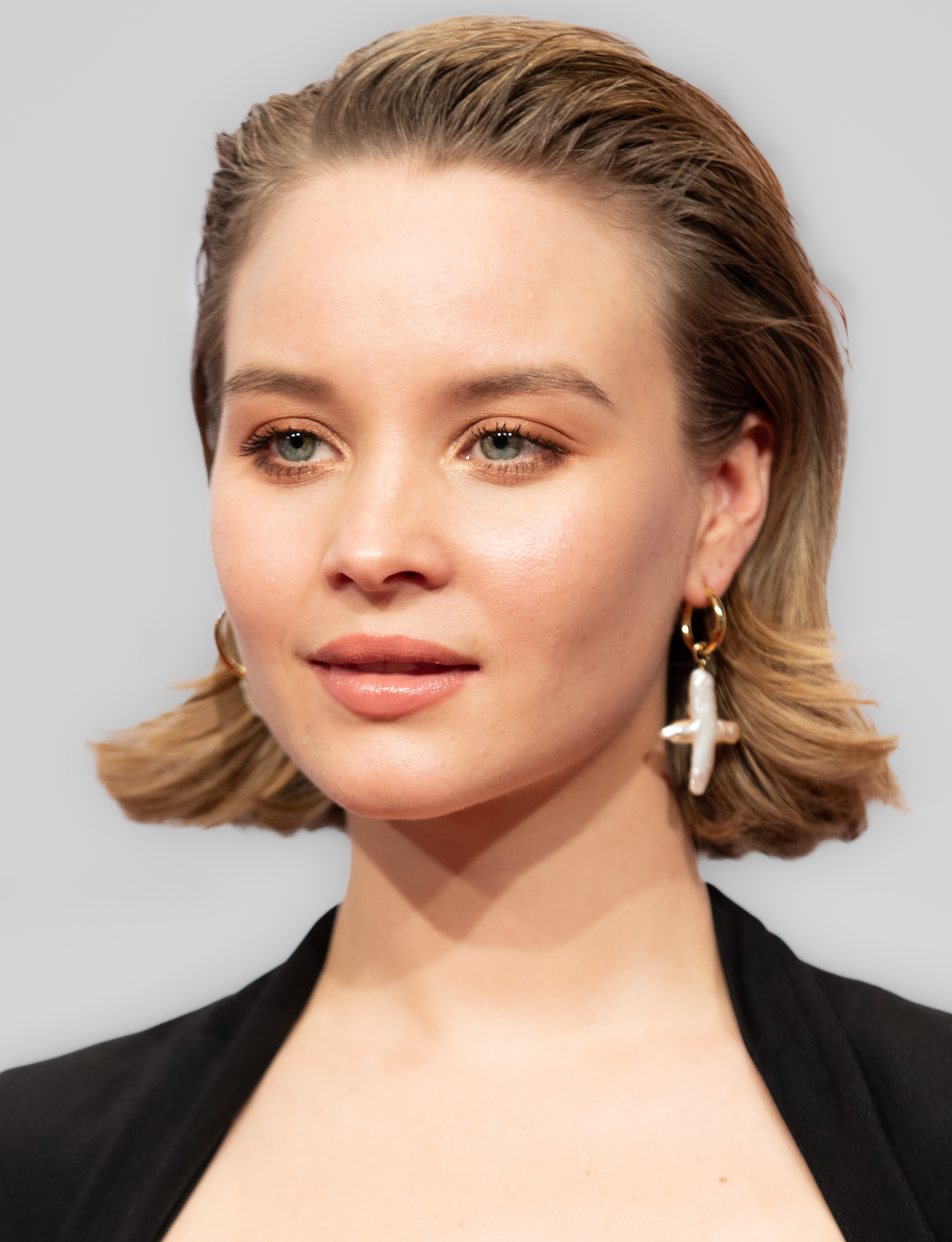
- Sonja Gerhardt in 2023
- Born: 2 April 1989 (age 37); West Berlin, West Germany
- Occupation: Actress
- Years active: 2006–present

Sonja Gerhardt (born 2 April 1989) is a German film and television actress. She is best known for her roles in the television series Schmetterlinge im Bauch and Deutschland 83, and Paranormal Activity: The Other Side.

== Filmography ==
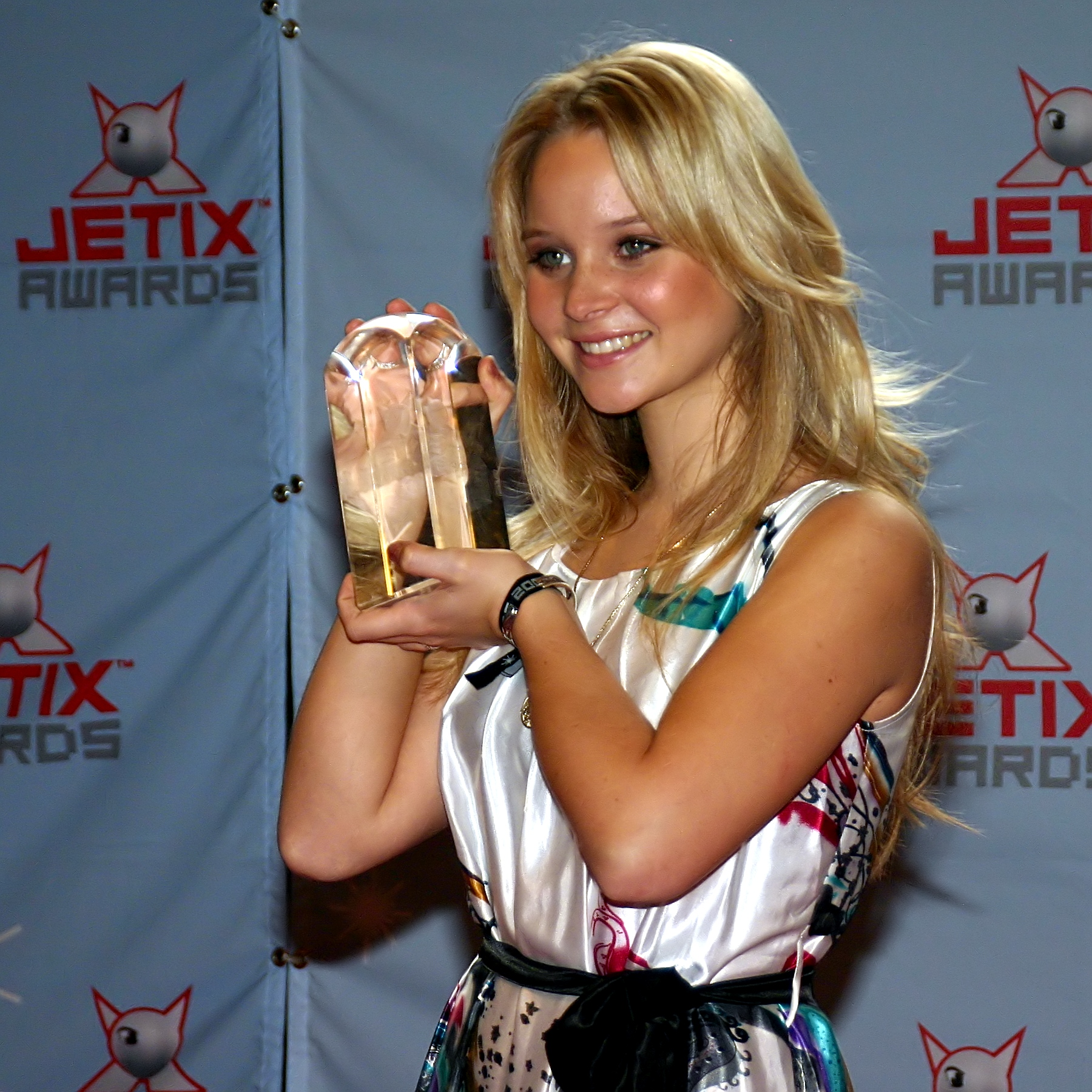
Gerhardt in 2008

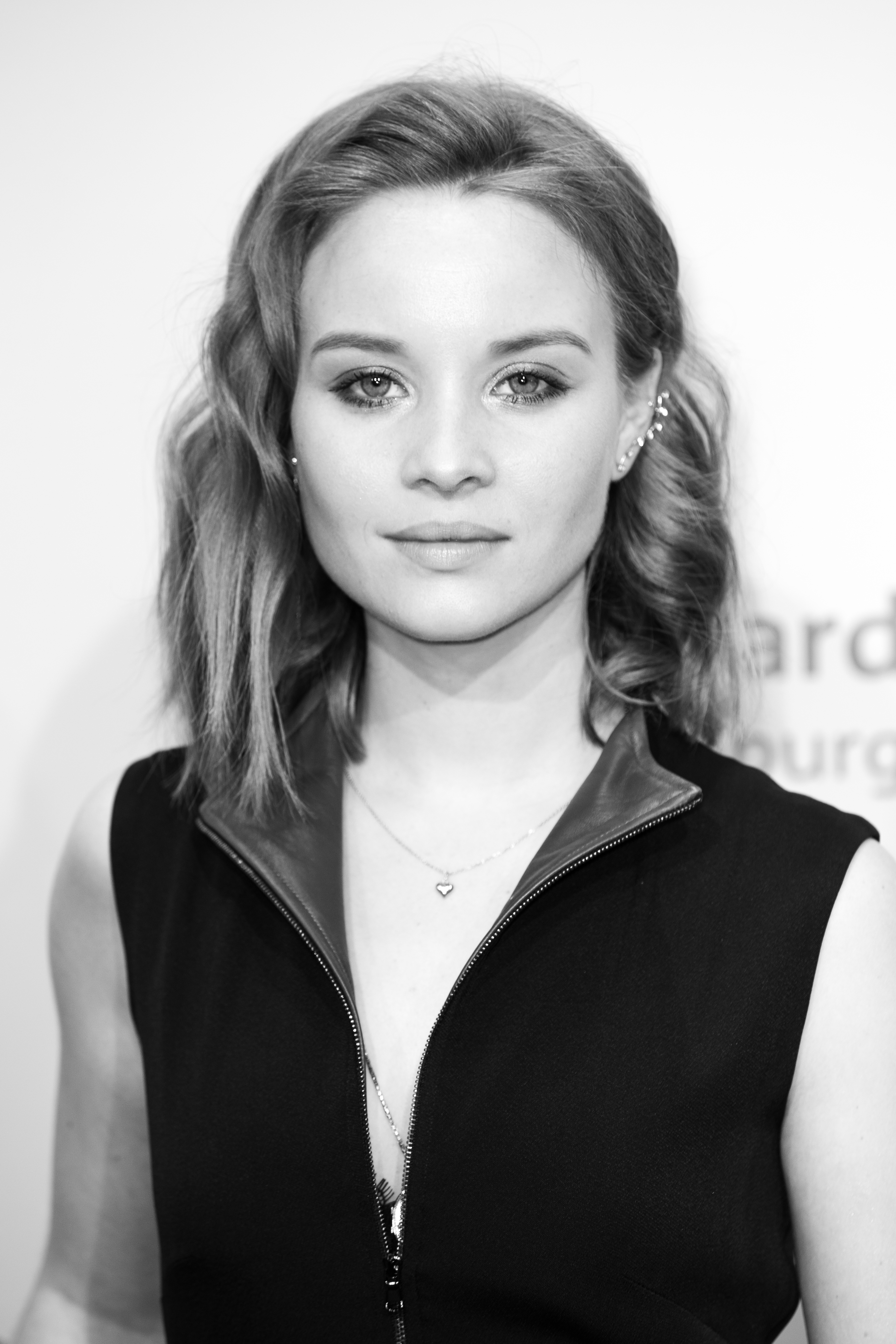
Gerhardt in 2019

- 2006: Schmetterlinge im Bauch
- 2008: Summer
- 2008: In aller Freundschaft
- 2008: Sklaven und Herren
- 2009: The Wild Chicks and Life
- 2009: Volcano
- 2009: WAGs
- 2010: Spook Inn
- 2010: Der Doc und die Hexe
- 2010: Stuttgart Homicide (Episode: Killesbergbaby)
- 2010: Spear of Destiny
- 2010: Polizeiruf 110 (Episode: Risiko)
- 2010: Das fremde Mädchen
- 2010: Tatort (Episode: Borowski und eine Frage von reinem Geschmack)
- 2010: Ein Date fürs Leben
- 2010: Doctor’s Diary
- 2011: The Seduction: The Strange Girl
- 2011: Großstadtrevier (Episode: Vertauscht)
- 2011: Küstenwache (Episode: Letzte Warnung)
- 2011: Krauses Braut
- 2011: Das Traumschiff (Episode: Kambodscha)
- 2011: My Own Flesh and Blood
- 2011: Rosa Roth (Episode: Bin ich tot?)
- 2012: The Hunt for the Amber Room
- 2012: Turkish for Beginners
- 2012: Mittlere Reife
- 2012: Heiraten ist auch keine Lösung
- 2012: Auf Herz und Nieren
- 2012: Danni Lowinski
- 2012: Schneeweißchen und Rosenrot
- 2013: Flaschenpost an meinen Mann
- 2013: Tape_13
- 2013: Heiter bis tödlich: Hauptstadtrevier
- 2014: #Vegas
- 2014: Die Schlikkerfrauen
- 2014: Weihnachten für Einsteiger
- 2014: Dessau Dancers
- 2015: Deutschland 83 (TV series)
- 2016: Jack the Ripper: The London Slasher
- 2016: Ku'damm 56 (TV series)
- 2017: Honigfrauen (TV series)
- 2018: Heilstätten
- 2018: Deutschland 86
- 2018: Cold Feet
- 2018: Ku'damm 59 (TV series)
- 2020: The Magic Kids: Three Unlikely Heroes
- 2023: Paranormal Activity: The Other Side
