= Farid Bang discography =

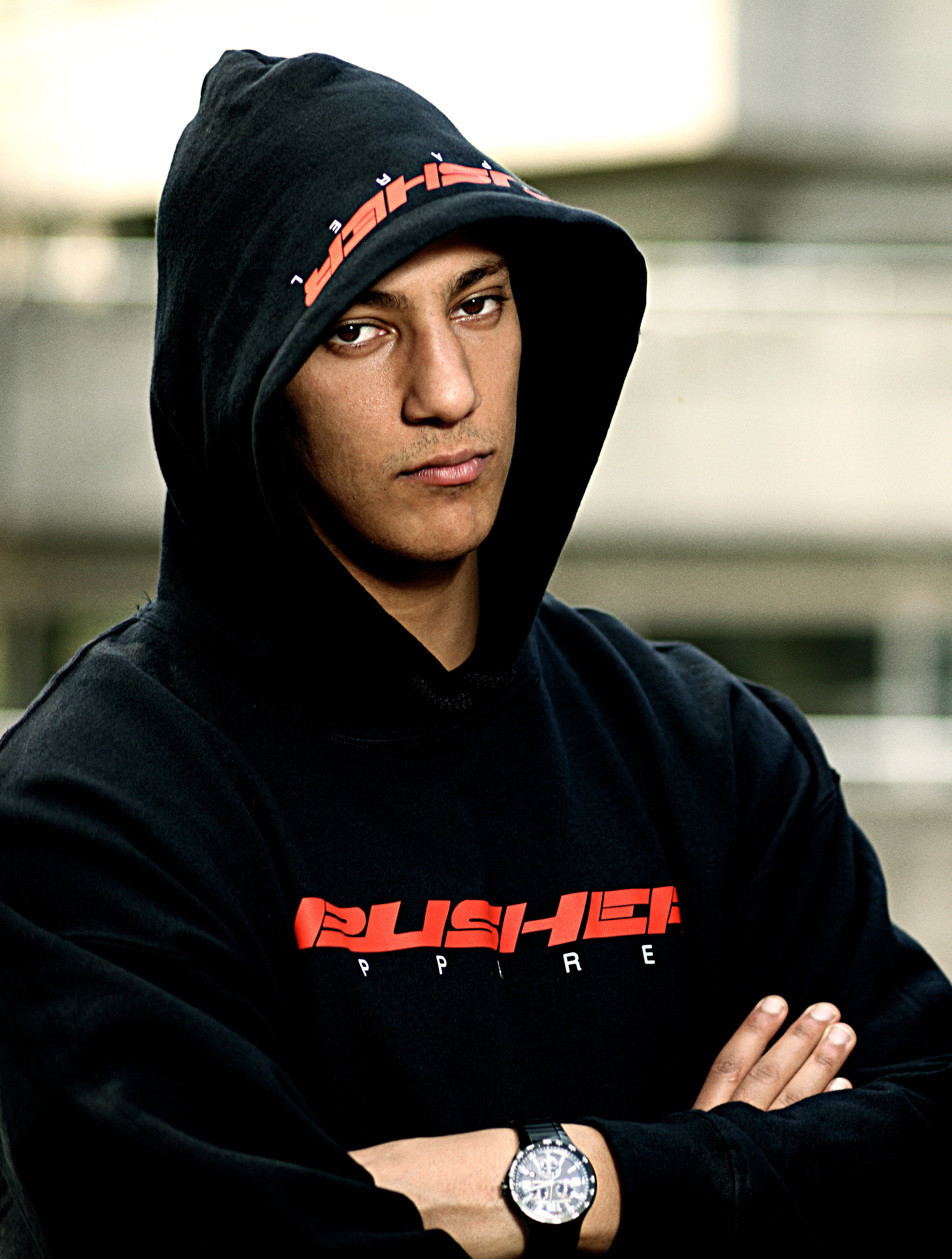
- Studio albums: 12
- Compilation albums: 1
- Singles: 50
- Music videos: 67
- Mixtapes: 2
- Collaborative albums: 5
- Extended plays: 6

German rapper Farid Bang has released twelve studio albums, five collaboration albums, two mixtapes, six extended plays, 50 singles and 67 music videos. Bang was awarded for sales of 1,200,000 records in both Germany and Austria.

== Albums ==
=== Studio albums ===
Title	Album details	Peak chart positions			Sales	Certifications
Title	Album details	GER	AUT	SWI	Sales	Certifications
Asphalt Massaka	Released: 4 July 2008; Label: German Dream/Intergroove; Formats: CD, digital download	—	—	—	—	—
Asphalt Massaka 2	Released: 12 March 2010; Label: 313 JWP/Sony Music/German Dream; Formats: CD	56	—	—	—	—
Banger leben kürzer	Released: 18 February 2011; Label: German Dream; Formats: CD	11	32	25	—	—
Der letzte Tag deines Lebens	Released: 27 January 2012; Label: German Dream; Formats: CD	3	11	7	—	—
Killa	Released: 14 March 2014; Label: BangerMusik; Formats: CD	1	1	3	GER: 100,000+	BVMI: Gold
Asphalt Massaka 3	Released: 27 March 2015; Label: BangerMusik; Formats: CD	1	3	1	GER: 100,000+	BVMI: Gold
Blut	Released: 27 May 2016; Label: BangerMusik; Formats: CD	2	1	1	—	—
Genkidama	Released: 29 May 2020; Label: BangerMusik; Formats: CD	11	5	3	—	—
Asozialer Marokkaner	Released: 23 July 2021; Label: BangerMusik; Formats: CD	1	2	1	—	—
X	Released: 26 November 2021; Label: BangerMusik; Formats: CD	13	11	8	—	—
Asphalt Massaka 4	Released: 27 October 2023; Label: BangerMusik; Formats: CD	3	6	3	—	—
XII	Released: 6 September 2024; Label: BangerMusik; Formats: CD	5	12	7	—	—

=== Collaborative albums ===
Title	Album details	Peak chart positions			Sales	Certifications
Title	Album details	GER	AUT	SWI	Sales	Certifications
Jung, brutal, gutaussehend (with Kollegah)	Released: 19 June 2009; Label: Selfmade Records; Formats: CD, digital download; Put on the Index in June 2012.	30	—	—	—	—
Jung, brutal, gutaussehend 2 (with Kollegah)	Released: 8 February 2013; Label: Selfmade Records; Formats: CD, digital download; Put on the Index in February 2014.	1	1	1	GER: 150,000+; AUT: 7,500+	BVMI: Gold; IFPI: Gold
Jung, brutal, gutaussehend 3 (with Kollegah)	Released: 1 December 2017; Label: Banger Musik, Alpha Music Empire, BMG; Formats: CD, digital download	1	1	1	GER: 200,000+; AUT: 7,500+	BVMI: Platinum; IFPI: Gold
Platin war gestern (with Kollegah)	Released: 10 August 2018; Label: Banger Musik, Alpha Music Empire, BMG; Formats: CD, digital download	1	1	1		
Deutschrap brandneu (with Capital Bra)	Released: 15 July 2022; Label: Banger Musik, Bra Music; Formats: CD, digital download	1	2	1		

=== Compilation albums ===
Title	Album details	Peak chart positions	
Title	Album details	GER	AUT
Endlich Urlaub	Released: 7 May 2008; Formats: Free Download	—	—
Asphalt Massaka – die Trilogie	Released: 11 March 2016; Label: Banger Musik; Formats: CD, digital download	22	60

=== Mixtapes ===
Title	Album details	Peak chart positions	
Title	Album details	GER	SWI
Torremolinos	Released: 6 December 2019; Label: Banger Musik; Formats: CD, digital download	42	83

== Extended plays ==
List of extended plays
Title	EP details	Peak chart positions
Title	EP details	SWI
§ 185 EP	Released: 1 December 2017; Label: Banger Musik, Alpha Music Empire, BMG; Formats: CD; with Kollegah	—
Nafri-Trap EP	Released: 29 June 2018; Formats: streaming audio; with Kollegah	48
Nurmagomedow EP	Released: 23 November 2018; Formats: CD	—
Kamehameha EP	Released: 28 May 2020; Formats: CD	—
Hustlaa EP	Released: 23 July 2021; Formats: CD	—
Home Run EP	Released: 25 November 2022; Formats: CD	—

== Singles ==
=== As lead artist ===
Title	Year	Peak chart positions			Album
Title	Year	GER	AUT	SWI	Album
"Mitternacht" (with Kollegah)	2009	—	—	—	Jung, brutal, gutaussehend
"Es ist soweit" (featuring Summer Cem)	2010	—	—	—	Asphalt Massaka 2
"Teufelskreis"	2011	—	—	—	Banger leben kürzer
"Irgendwann"	2012	—	—	—	Der letzte Tag deines Lebens
"Dynamit" (with Kollegah)	2012	28	39	41	Jung, brutal, gutaussehend 2
"Drive-By" (with Kollegah)	2012	41	—	—	Jung, brutal, gutaussehend 2
"Du kennst den Westen" (with Kollegah)	2013	41	71	—	Jung, brutal, gutaussehend 2
"Stiernackenkommando" (with Kollegah)	2013	58	—	—	Jung, brutal, gutaussehend 2
"Bitte Spitte Toi Lab"	2013	32	39	72	Killa
"Lutsch"	2014	44	59	61	Killa
"Dein Weg"	2014	86	—	—	Killa
"King & Killa" (with Kollegah)	2014	50	67	—	Killa
"Goodfellas" (featuring Bushido)	2014	54	62	53	Killa
"Johnny Fontaine"	2015	—	69	—	Asphalt Massaka 3
"Creed"	2016	95	—	—	Creed-Soundtrack
"Sturmmaske auf (Intro)" (with Kollegah)	2017	1	6	15	Jung Brutal Gutaussehend 3
"Zieh' den Rucksack aus" (with Kollegah)	2017	4	12	35	Jung Brutal Gutaussehend 3
"Farid Ben & Friend (JBG3 Disstrack)" (with Kollegah)	2017	58	—	—	Jung Brutal Gutaussehend 3
"Gamechanger" (with Kollegah)	2017	6	16	24	Jung Brutal Gutaussehend 3
"Ave Maria" (with Kollegah)	2017	5	9	15	Jung Brutal Gutaussehend 3
"Die JBG3 Weihnachtsgeschichte" (with Kollegah)	2017	—	—	—	Jung Brutal Gutaussehend 3 X-Mas Edition
"One Night Stand" (with Kollegah)	2017	51	—	—	Jung Brutal Gutaussehend 3 New Year Edition
"All Eyez on Us" (with Kollegah)	2018	39	59	81	Platin war gestern
"Mitternacht 2" (with Kollegah)	2018	19	25	43	Platin war gestern
"In die Unendlichkeit" (with Kollegah feat. Musiye)	2018	39	55	91	Platin war gestern
"International Gangstas" (with 6ix9ine and Capo featuring SCH)	2018	5	11	8	Nurmagomedow EP
"Nurmagomedow" (with The Game)	2018	33	41	51	Nurmagomedow EP
"#niemalsantäuschen"	2019	4	9	16	Nurmagomedow EP
"Kugelsicherer Jugendlicher" (with Play69 and Fler)	2019	80	—	—	Kugelsicherer Jugendlicher
"Respektlose Jungs" (Fler featuring Farid Bang)	2019	65	—	—	Colucci
"Maghreb Gang" (featuring French Montana and Khaled)	2019	4	7	5	Torremolinos
"Millionär"	2019	40	59	—	Torremolinos
"Fulu$" (featuring Musiye and Blueface)	2019	44	61	86	Torremolinos
"Stier"	2019	17	40	41	Torremolinos
"Genkidama"	2020	22	36	39	Genkidama
"Public Enemies" (featuring Fler and Kollegah)	2020	12	19	27	Genkidama
"Ching Ching Ching"	2020	29	51	55	Genkidama
"Teuer Teuer"	2020	28	54	66	Genkidama
"Quavo"	2020	22	41	62	Genkidama
"Loco" (featuring 18 Karat and AK Ausserkontrolle)	2020	21	38	47	Genkidama
"Nador City Gang"	2020	33	42	46	Genkidama
"Kaioken" (featuring Tory Lanez)	2020	36	46	65	Non-album singles
"Olajuwon" (featuring Bass Sultan Hengzt, Sipo and Fler)	2020	59	—	—	Non-album singles

=== As featured artist ===
Title	Year	Peak chart positions			Album
Title	Year	GER	AUT	SWI	Album
"Madrid" (Summer Cem featuring Farid Bang)	2010	—	—	—	Feierabend
"Kanax in Paris" (KC Rebell featuring Farid Bang)	2013	60	66	—	Banger rebellieren
"Helal Money" (Kay One featuring Farid Bang)	2013	71	—	—	Rich Kidz
"Gangsta Rap Kings" (Bushido featuring Kollegah & Farid Bang)	2014	45	74	—	Sonny Black
"Kanax in Moskau" (KC Rebell featuring Farid Bang)	2014	32	43	37	Rebellution
"Cohibas, blauer Dunst" (Kollegah featuring Farid Bang)	2014	61	—	—	King
"BADT" (Majoe featuring Kollegah & Farid Bang)	2014	55	70	—	Breiter als der Türsteher
"Mafia Musik" (Summer Cem featuring Farid Bang)	2014	59	75	—	Non-album single
"Ballermann (Wildlands)" (KC Rebell featuring Farid Bang)	2016	94	—	—	Abstand
"American Express" (Kollegah featuring Farid Bang)	2016	29	62	61	Imperator
"Banger Imperium" (Majoe feat. Farid Bang, KC Rebell, Jasko, Summer Cem, 18 Karat & Play69)	2017	82	—	—	Auge des Tigers
"Silberner Ferrari" (Majoe feat. Farid Bang)	2017	83	—	—	Auge des Tigers
"AMG" (Fler feat. Farid Bang)	2018	19	32	42	Flizzy
"Komm ins Café 2" (18 Karat feat. Farid Bang)	2018	53	63	88	Geld Gold Gras
"Panzer, Tiger" (Capital Bra feat. Farid Bang)	2018	31	36	—	Berlin lebt
"Weg weg weg" (Summer Cem feat. Farid Bang)	2018	79	—	—	Endstufe
"Kugelsicherer Jugendlicher" (Play69 feat. Farid Bang & Fler)	2019	80	—	—	Kugelsicherer Jugendlicher
"Woah 2" (Ali As feat. Farid Bang & Veysel)	2020	—	—	—	Non-album single

== Other charted songs ==
Title	Year	Peak chart positions			Album
Title	Year	GER	AUT	SWI	Album
"Rap wieder Rap" (with Kollegah)	2017	7	19	22	Jung, brutal, gutaussehend 3
"Es wird Zeit" (with Kollegah)	2017	8	21	31	Jung, brutal, gutaussehend 3
"Studiogangster" (with Kollegah)	2017	13	31	—	Jung, brutal, gutaussehend 3
"Jung Brutal Gutaussehend 2017" (with Kollegah)	2017	16	34	—	Jung, brutal, gutaussehend 3
"Düsseldorfer" (with Kollegah)	2017	17	40	—	Jung, brutal, gutaussehend 3
"Wenn der Gegner am Boden liegt" (with Kollegah)	2017	19	37	—	Jung, brutal, gutaussehend 3
"Jagdsaison" (with Kollegah)	2017	22	42	—	Jung, brutal, gutaussehend 3
"Frontload" (with Kollegah)	2017	24	50	—	Jung, brutal, gutaussehend 3
"Eines Tages" (with Kollegah)	2017	25	46	—	Jung, brutal, gutaussehend 3
"Die letzte Gangsterrapcrew" (with Kollegah)	2017	26	56	—	Jung, brutal, gutaussehend 3
"Massephase" (with Kollegah)	2017	27	57	—	Jung, brutal, gutaussehend 3
"Warlordz" (with Kollegah)	2017	31	60	—	Jung, brutal, gutaussehend 3
"In jeder deutschen Großstadt" (with Kollegah)	2017	34	67	—	Jung, brutal, gutaussehend 3
"Älter brutaler skrupelloser (Outro)" (with Kollegah)	2017	38	72	—	Jung, brutal, gutaussehend 3
"G-Modelle" (with Kollegah)	2018	92	—	—	Platin war gestern
"Nuklearer Winter" (with Kollegah)	2018	94	—	—	Platin war gestern
"Scarface" (featuring Capo and Rick Ross)	2020	15	23	25	Genkidama
"Guerilla" (featuring Samra and Capital Bra)	2020	—	59	50	Genkidama
"Casanova" (featuring SSIO)	2020	—	—	76	Genkidama

== Free tracks ==
Year	Title	Info(s)
2006	"Generation X" (feat. Eko Fresh & Summer Cem)	Released on Juice CD #69
2007	"40 Kugeln" (40 bullets)	
2007	"Herz aus Stein" (Heart of stone)	
2008	"24 Kugeln" (24 bullets)	
2008	"Kriminell" (Criminal)	Released on Juice CD #87
2008	"Du bist ein Bastard" (You are a bastard)	
2008	"Der neue King of Rap" (The new king of rap)	
2008	"Zurück" (Back)	
2009	"Wir ficken die Szene" (We fuck the scene) (feat. Kollegah)	
2009	"Arschloch" (Asshole)	Contains a sample of "Es ist geil ein Arschloch zu sein" by Christian
2010	Ich bin Jean-Claude Van Damme" (I am Jean-Claude Van Damme)	Released on Juice CD #105
