= List of number-one hip-hop albums of 2018 (Germany) =

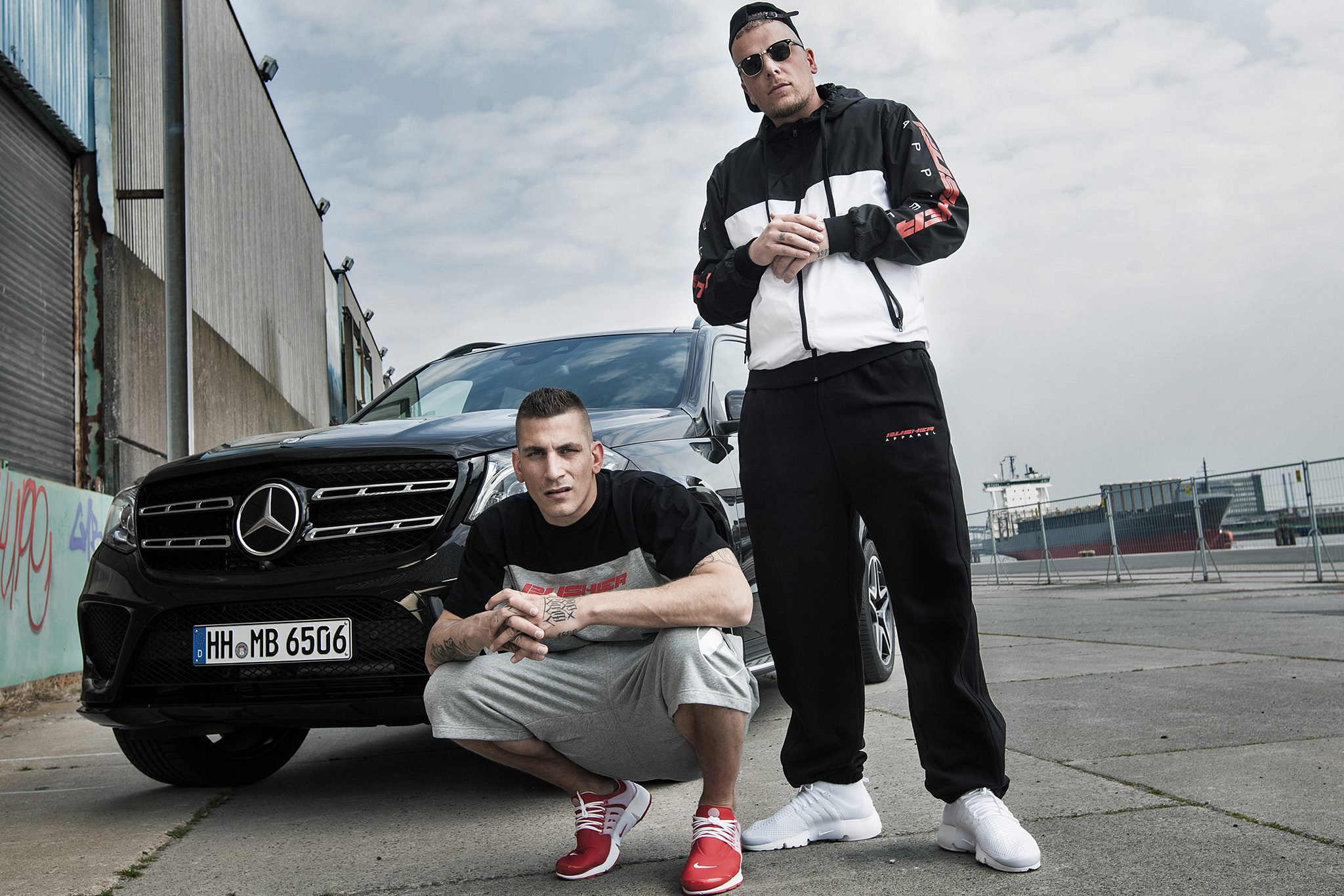
Gzuz' Wolke 7 topped the charts for four consecutive weeks.

The official German hip-hop album charts are record charts compiled by GfK Entertainment GmbH on behalf of Bundesverband Musikindustrie (Federal Association of Phonographic Industry). The hip hop charts only include albums and were introduced on 1 April 2015. The chart week runs from Friday to Thursday with the official chart being published on the following Monday. The charts are based on sales of physical albums from retail outlets as well as permanent music downloads and streaming.

== Chart history ==
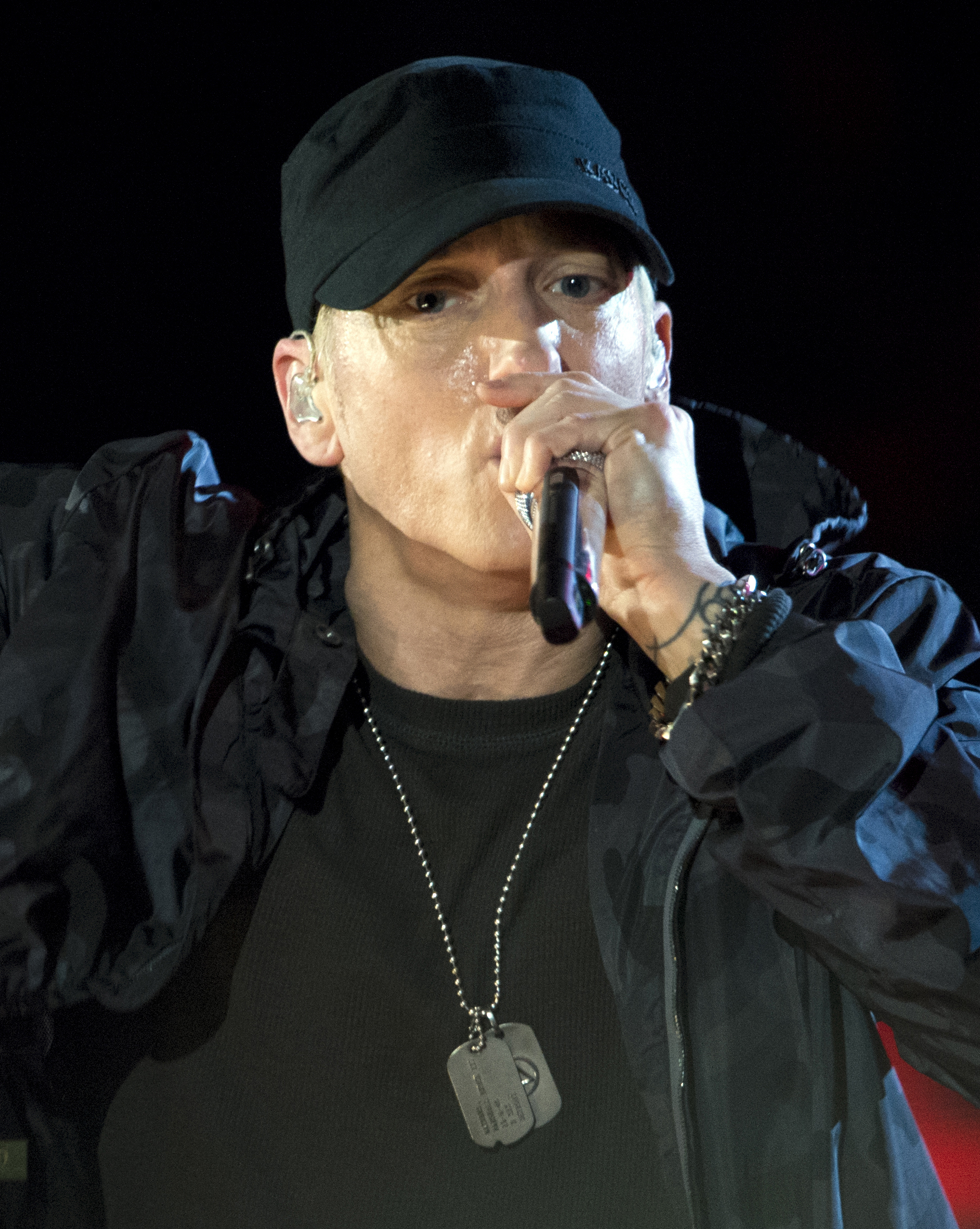
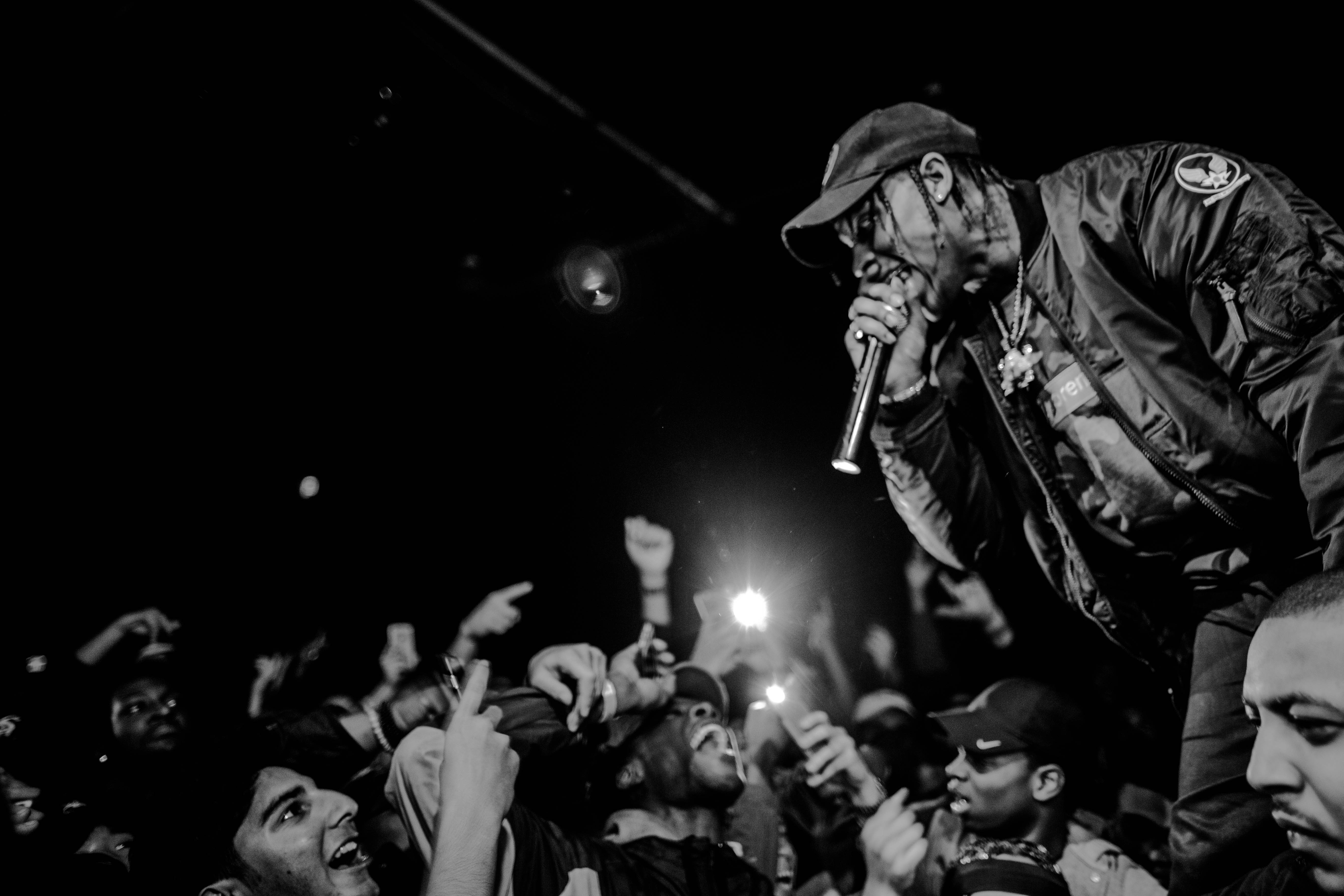
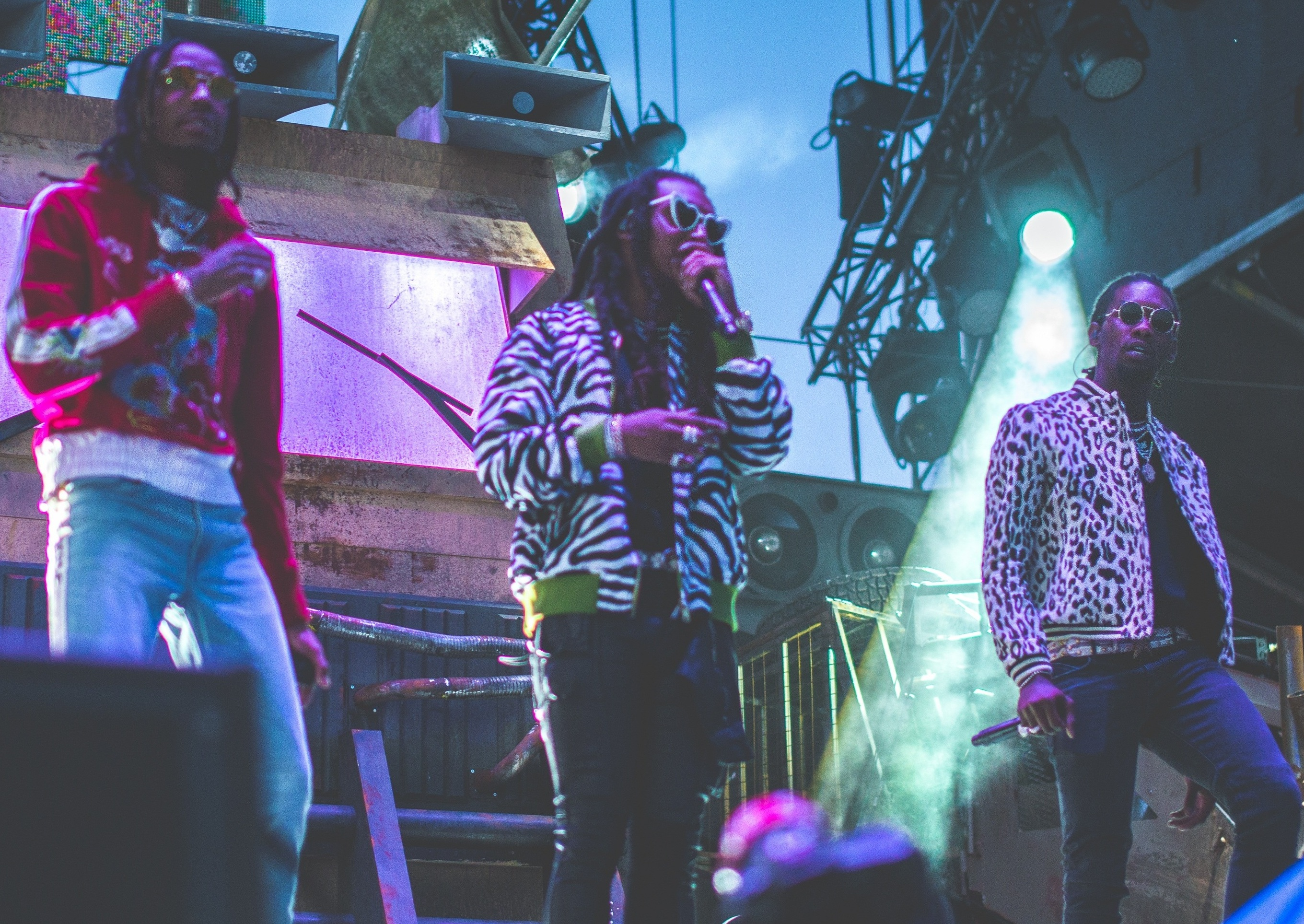
Eminem's Revival, Kamikaze, Travis Scott's Astroworld and Migos' Culture II were the only non German albums on the chart in 2018.

| Issue date | Album | Artist(s) | Ref. |
|---|---|---|---|
| 5 January | Revival | Eminem | |
| 12 January | Revival | Eminem | |
| 19 January | Desperadoz II | PA Sports & Kianush | |
| 26 January | Jung Brutal Gutaussehend 3 | Kollegah & Farid Bang | |
| 2 February | Culture II | Migos | |
| 9 February | Beastmode 3 | Animus | |
| 16 February | Revival | Eminem | |
| 23 February | Die Zwielicht LP | Haze | |
| 2 March | A.i.d.S ROYAL | B-Tight | |
| 9 March | Rolexesh | Olexesh | |
| 16 March | Geld Gold Gras | 18 Karat | |
| 23 March | Ausnahmezustand | Ruffiction | |
| 30 March | Flizy | Fler | |
| 6 April | Fast Life | Azet | |
| 13 April | Fast Life | Azet | |
| 20 April | 808 | Ufo361 | |
| 27 April | Gift | Eunique | |
| 4 May | Verde | Marsimoto | |
| 11 May | 1220 | Yung Hurn | |
| 18 May | Erde & Knochen | Kontra K | |
| 25 May | Erde & Knochen | Kontra K | |
| 1 June | Wolke 7 | Gzuz | |
| 8 June | Wolke 7 | Gzuz | |
| 15 June | Wolke 7 | Gzuz | |
| 22 June | Wolke 7 | Gzuz | |
| 29 June | Berlin lebt | Capital Bra | |
| 6 July | Bratans aus Favelas | Juri | |
| 13 July | Berlin lebt | Capital Bra | |
| 20 July | Berlin lebt | Capital Bra | |
| 27 July | Herzblut | MC Bilal | |
| 3 August | Endstufe | Summer Cem | |
| 10 August | Astroworld | Travis Scott | |
| 17 August | Platin war gestern | Kollegah & Farid Bang | |
| 24 August | VVS | Ufo361 | |
| 31 August | VVS | Ufo361 | |
| 7 September | 1982 | Materia & Casper | |
| 14 September | Kamikaze | Eminem | |
| 21 September | Schlaftabletten, Rotwein V | Alligatoah | |
| 28 September | Alles oder Nix II | Xatar | |
| 5 October | Mythos | Bushido | |
| 12 October | Palmen aus Plastik 2 | RAF Camora & Bonez MC | |
| 19 October | Palmen aus Plastik 2 | RAF Camora & Bonez MC | |
| 26 October | Y.A.L.A | Genetikk | |
| 2 November | Palmen aus Plastik 2 | RAF Camora & Bonez MC | |
| 9 November | Allein | Capital Bra | |
| 16 November | XY | AK Ausserkontrolle | |
| 23 November | Palmen aus Plastik 2 | RAF Camora & Bonez MC | |
| 30 November | L.O.C.O. | Luciano | |
| 7 December | Authentic Athletic 2 | Olexesh | |
| 14 December | Monument | Kollegah | |
| 21 December | Kronjuwelen | Sido | |
| 28 December | Palmen aus Plastik 2 | Bonez MC & RAF Camora | |
