= GfK Entertainment hip-hop albums chart =

Official hip hop albums music chart in Germany

The GfK Entertainment hip-hop albums chart is the official hip-hop albums music chart in Germany and are gathered and published by GfK Entertainment (formerly Media Control and Media Control GfK International) on behalf of Bundesverband Musikindustrie. The chart was officially introduced on 1 April 2015. The chart week runs from Friday to Thursday with the official chart being published on the following Wednesday. The charts are based on sales of physical albums from retail outlets as well as permanent music downloads and streaming.

== Number-one albums ==
- 2015
- 2016
- 2017
- 2018
- 2019

== Most weeks at number-one ==
Album	Artist(s)	Wks.	Year(s)	Ref.
Palmen aus Plastik 2	Bonez MC & RAF Camora	8	2018/2019	
MTV Unplugged	Cro	6	2015	
VI	Sido	5	2015	
High & Hungrig 2	Bonez MC & Gzuz	5	2016	
Palmen aus Plastik	Bonez MC & RAF Camora	5	2016/17	
Sampler 4	187 Strassenbande	4	2017	
Wolke 7	Gzuz	4	2017	
Revival	Eminem	4	2017/18	
Jung Brutal Gutaussehend 3	Kollegah & Farid Bang	3	2017/18	

== Most number-one albums ==
Includes collaborative albums

Artist	No.	Albums	Ref.
Kollegah	5	Zuhältertape Vol. 4; Imperator; Jung Brutal Gutaussehend 3; Platin war gestern; Monument	
RAF Camora	4	Ghøst; Palmen aus Plastik; Anthrazit; Palmen aus Plastik 2	
Bonez MC	3	Palmen aus Plastik; High & Hungrig 2; Palmen aus Plastik 2	
Genetikk	3	Achter Tag; Fukk Genetikk; Y.A.L.A	
Kanye West	3	Donda; Vultures 1; Bully	

== See also ==
- GfK Entertainment charts
