= Monument (Kollegah album) =

Studio album by Kollegah
- Released: 7 December 2018
- Recorded: August–October 2018 in New York City and Düsseldorf
- Label: Alpha Music Empire; Warner Music Germany
- Producer: AraabMuzik; Freshmaker; Scott Storch; Gee Futuristic; Niklas Köllner; M3; Robert Jan van der Tom; Federico Vaccari; Pietro Miano; Figub Brazlevic; Johnny Illstrument; Joznez

Kollegah chronology
Platin war gestern (2018)	Monument (2018)

Singles from Monument
- 1. "Dear Lord" Released: 5 October 2018; 2. "Löwe" Released: 25 October 2018; 3. "Das erste Mal" Released: 2 November 2018; 4. "Gospel" Released: 15 November 2018; 5. "Orbit" Released: 30 November 2018

Singles from Hoodtape Volume 3
- 1. "Empire State of Grind" Released: 12 October 2018; 2. "Push it to the Limit" Released: 19 October 2018; 3. "Most Wanted" Released: 9 November 2018

Monument is the seventh studio album by German rapper Kollegah, released on 7 December 2018 through his own label Alpha Music Empire. The album is Kollegah's first solo album since 2016's Imperator. The double album also included his tenth mixtape Hoodtape Volume 3.

== Background and release ==
Kollegah released his third collaborative studio album alongside German rapper Farid Bang, Jung Brutal Gutaussehend 3, in December 2017. The album became an immediate success for them, debuting on the pole positions in German-speaking Europe and being certified platinum by the Bundesverband Musikindustrie (BVMI) and gold by the IFPI Austria. Following a controversy about antisemitic lyrics on the bonus EP §185, both rappers released Platin war gestern in August 2018.

Kollegah announced Monument on 1 October 2018. It was released by Alpha Music Empire, Kollegah's record label. On 1 October 2018, the limited box set was made available to pre-order on Amazon for €43.99.

== Track listing ==
Credits adapted from Spotify.

Monument
No.	Title	Lyrics	Music	Length
1.	"Orbit"	Felix Blume	AraabMuzik	2:52
2.	"Dear Lord"	Blume	AraabMuzik	4:52
3.	"Blow Out"	Blume	Gee Futuristic; Niklas Köllner	3:01
4.	"Royal"	Blume	Robert Jan van der Tom	2:52
5.	"Das erste Mal" (featuring 18 Karat)	Blume; 18 Karat	Freshmaker	2:52
6.	"Bossmove"	Blume	AraabMuzik	3:14
7.	"Gospel"	Blume	AraabMuzik	2:47
8.	"Psycho" (featuring Farid Bang)	Blume; Farid El Abdellaoui	M3	2:55
9.	"Löwe"	Blume	Scott Storch	5:30
10.	"La Vida Koka"	Blume	AraabMuzik	3:03
11.	"Makiaveli"	Blume	AraabMuzik	3:52
12.	"Realtalk"	Blume	AraabMuzik	3:34
13.	"Continental" (featuring Nas)	Blume; Nasir bin Olu Dara Jones	iLL Wayno	3:26
14.	"Donlife" (featuring Cam'ron)	Blume; Cameron Ezike Giles	AraabMuzik	3:08
15.	"Cohiba Symphony"	Blume	AraabMuzik	3:56
16.	"Da"	Blume	Federico Vaccari; Pietro Miano	2:58
17.	"Monument (Outro)"	Blume	Gee Futuristic; Niklas Köllner	6:09

Hoodtape Volume 3
No.	Title	Lyrics	Music	Length
18.	"Nightking"	Blume	Gee Futuristic; Niklas Köllner	2:04
19.	"Frontale Faust"	Blume	Kai Engelmann; Phillip Herwig	2:40
20.	"Spastivater / Nuttemum"	Blume	Kai Engelmann; Phillip Herwig	2:54
21.	"Arm aus dem Fenster"	Blume	Kai Engelmann; Phillip Herwig	2:19
22.	"Wingman"	Blume	Kai Engelmann; Phillip Herwig	2:27
23.	"Usain Bolt"	Blume	Kai Engelmann; Phillip Herwig	2:24
24.	"Consuela"	Blume	Kai Engelmann; Phillip Herwig	2:12
25.	"Most Wanted"	Blume	Johannes Löffler; Johnny Illstrument; Jonathan Kiunke; Mario Skalako	2:21
26.	"Gerichtsverhandlung"	Blume	Kai Engelmann; Phillip Herwig	1:58
27.	"Prison Break"	Blume	Kai Engelmann; Phillip Herwig	3:02
28.	"Szenendrogenrausch"	Blume	Kai Engelmann; Phillip Herwig	4:09
29.	"Wenn der Boss das sieht"	Blume	Gee Futuristic; Niklas Köllner	2:05
30.	"Nutte sag mir wie die Aktien stehen" (featuring Sentino)	Blume; Sebastian Enrique Alvarez	Juh-Dee	4:04
31.	"Bossplaya"	Blume	Gee Futuristic; Niklas Köllner	2:35
32.	"Fairness im Wettkampf"	Blume	Kai Engelmann; Phillip Herwig	2:20
33.	"Der weiße Lotus"	Blume	Kai Engelmann; Phillip Herwig	4:58
34.	"Da Vinci Flow"	Blume	Juh-Dee	2:05
35.	"Heavyweight" (featuring Noir)	Blume; Noir	Gee Futuristic; Mohamed Chahrour; Patrick Stakic	2:19
36.	"Empire State of Grind"	Blume	Figub Brazlevič	2:35
37.	"Crystal in der Town" (featuring Prinz Harry)	Blume; Prinz Harry	Gee Futuristic	4:00
38.	"Push it to the Limit"	Blume	Johannes Löffler; Jonathan Kiunke; Mario Skakalo	2:30
39.	"Bellagio Boys" (featuring Noir)	Blume; Noir	Gee Futuristic; Leon Tiepold; Patrick Stakic	3:16
40.	"Macht" (featuring Seyed, Gent, Jigzaw, Asche)	Blume; Seyed Mohammad Sascha Edalat-Pur; Gentrit Avdyli; Nuhsan Coskun; Asche	Mesh	4:10
41.	"MTV Cribs"	Blume	Juh-Dee	5:06
42.	"Es ist der Boss"	Blume	Faisal Muhammad Faendrich; Jonathan Kiunke; Mario Skakalo	2:54
43.	"Testament"	Blume	AraabMuzik	4:29
Total length:				2:20

== Charts ==
=== Weekly charts ===
Chart (2018)	Peak position
Austrian Albums (Ö3 Austria)	1
German Albums (Offizielle Top 100)	1
German Albums (Top 20 Hip Hop)	1
Swiss Albums (Schweizer Hitparade)	1

=== Year-end charts ===
Chart (2018)	Position
Austrian Albums (Ö3 Austria)	67
Swiss Albums (Schweizer Hitparade)	96

Chart (2019)	Position
German Albums (Offizielle Top 100)	18
