= Dear Lord =

Single by Kollegah

from the album Monument
- Language: German
- Released: 5 October 2018
- Recorded: 2018
- Studio: Quad Recordings (New York City); Octalogic (Ludwigshafen)
- Length: 4:53
- Label: Alpha Music Empire
- Lyricist(s): Kollegah
- Producer(s): AraabMuzik

Kollegah singles chronology
"Wie ein Alpha" (2018)	"Dear Lord" (2018)	"Empire State of Grind" (2018)

Music video
- "Dear Lord" on YouTube

"Dear Lord" is a song recorded by German rapper Kollegah for his seventh studio album Monument (2018). The single was made available for digital download and streaming audio on 5 October 2018, through Alpha Music Empire.

== Background ==
Kollegah released his sixth studio album, Imperator, in December 2016. He released two collaborative studio albums with German rapper Farid Bang—Jung Brutal Gutaussehend 3 (2017) and Platin war gestern (2018). In September 2018, he released "Wie ein Alpha", his first solo single in more than 16 months. The second single, "Dear Lord", was announced through Instagram and was released on 5 October 2018.

== Music video ==
The music video was directed by Adam Film and was shot in Vietnam and in the United Arab Emirates.

== Personnel ==
Recorded at Quad Recordings Studios in New York City and Octalogic in Ludwigshafen.

- Kollegah – vocals, songwriting
- AraabMuzik – production
- Kostas Karagiozidis – mix engineering, mastering

== Charts ==
Chart (2018)	Peak position
Austria (Ö3 Austria Top 40)	58
Germany (GfK)	48
Switzerland (Schweizer Hitparade)	98
