= List of number-one hip-hop albums of 2017 (Germany) =

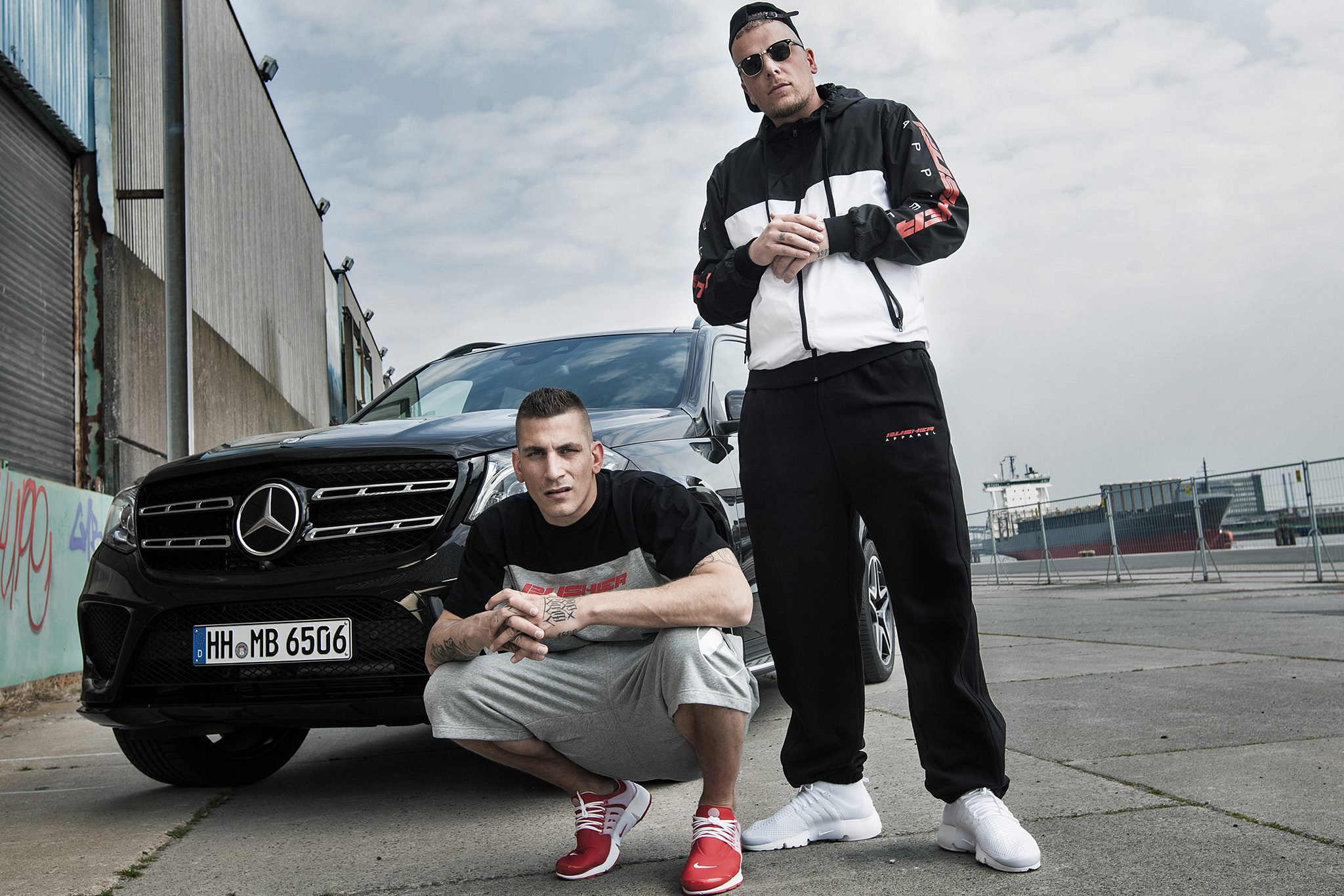
Gzuz (left) and Bonez MC (right), two members of the 187 Strassenbande; the group's Sampler 4 topped the chart for four consecutive weeks.

The official German hip-hop album chart is a record charts compiled by GfK Entertainment GmbH on behalf of Bundesverband Musikindustrie (Federal Association of Phonographic Industry). The chart week runs from Friday to Thursday with the official chart being published on the following Monday. The charts are based on sales of physical albums from retail outlets as well as permanent music downloads and streaming.

In 2017, forty-six albums reached the top of the chart. The first number one of the year was Palmen aus Plastik by German rapper Bonez MC and Austrian rapper RAF Camora and was replaced in the following week by A Tribe Called Quest's last studio album We Got It from Here... Thank You 4 Your Service. The first album to top the chart for more than a week was Sampler 4 by 187 Strassenbande. The sampler album topped the chart for four consecutive weeks during the summer. Royal Bunker by Sido and Kool Savas, Jung Brutal Gutaussehend 3 by Kollegah and Farid Bang and Revival, by Eminem were the only other albums to top the chart for longer than a week. The chart was dominated by German artists, with only four English language albums reaching the top, including A Tribe Called Quest's We Got It from Here... Thank You 4 Your Service, More Life by Drake, Kendrick Lamar's Damn and Eminem's Revival, for a total of five weeks. Revival was the final album to reach the top in 2017.

== Chart history ==
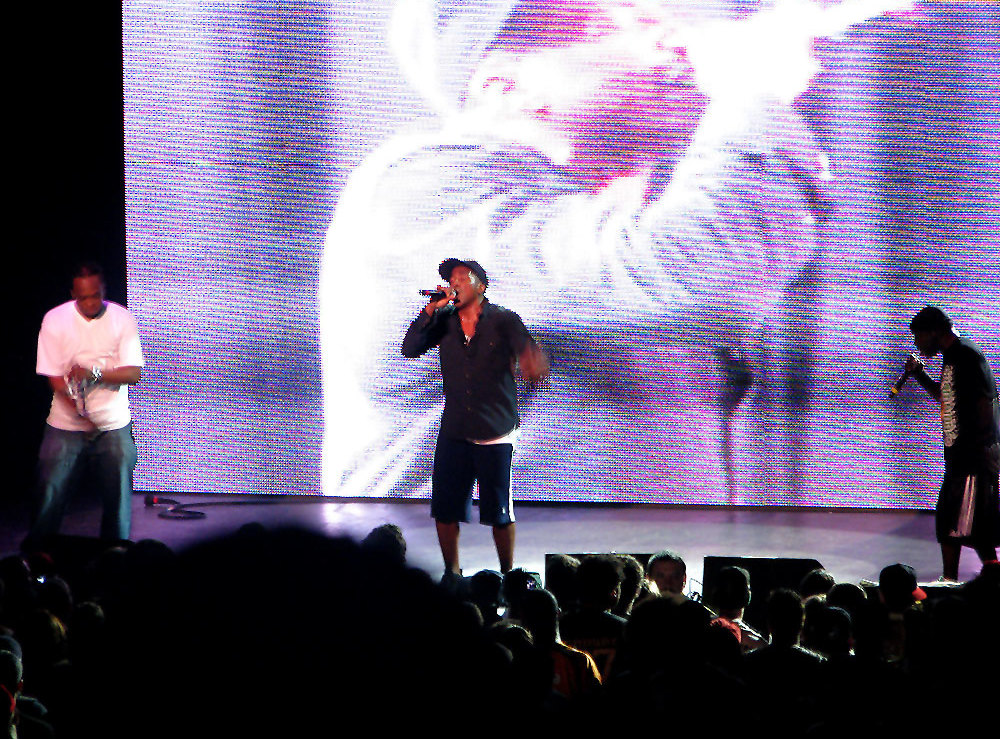
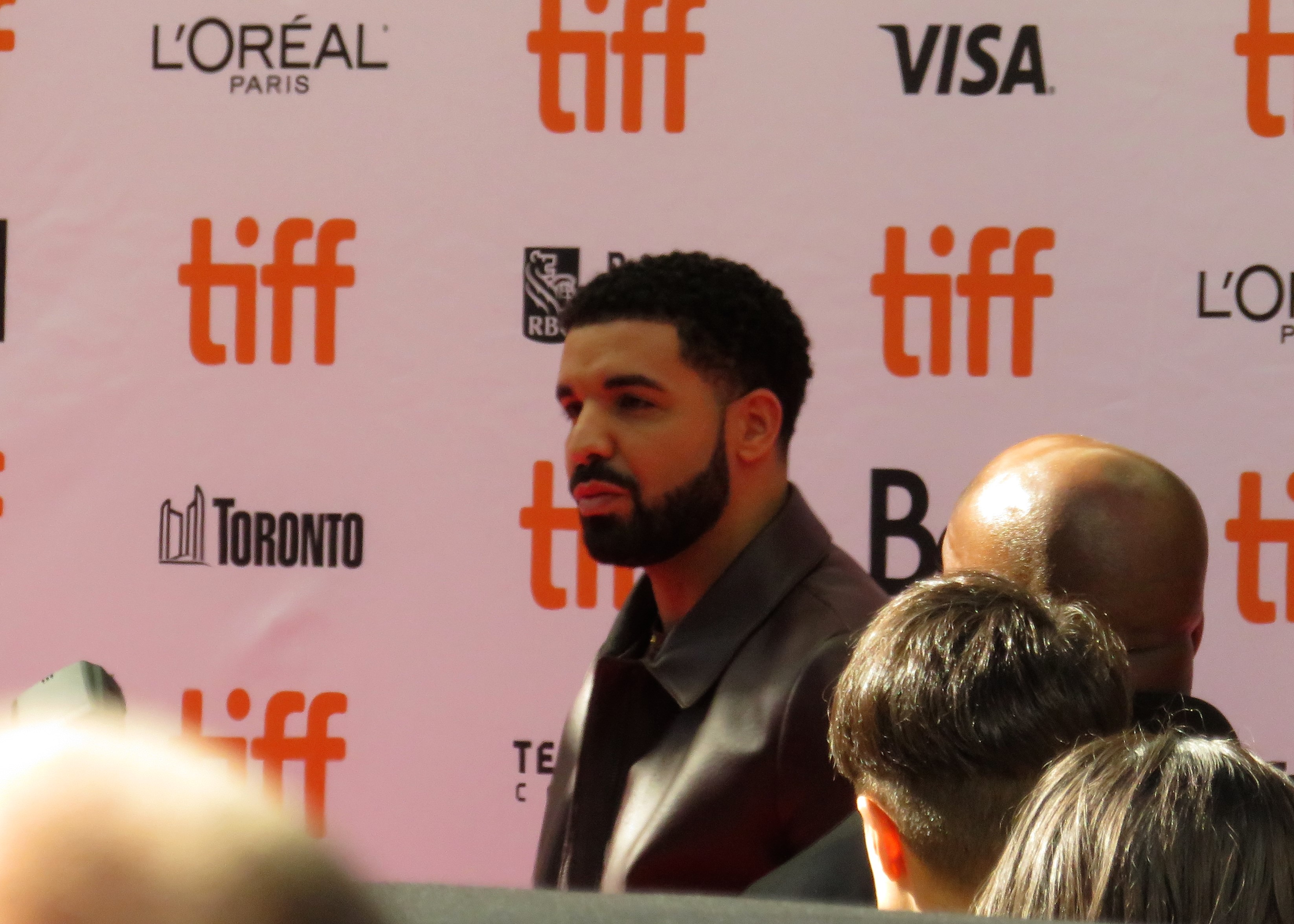
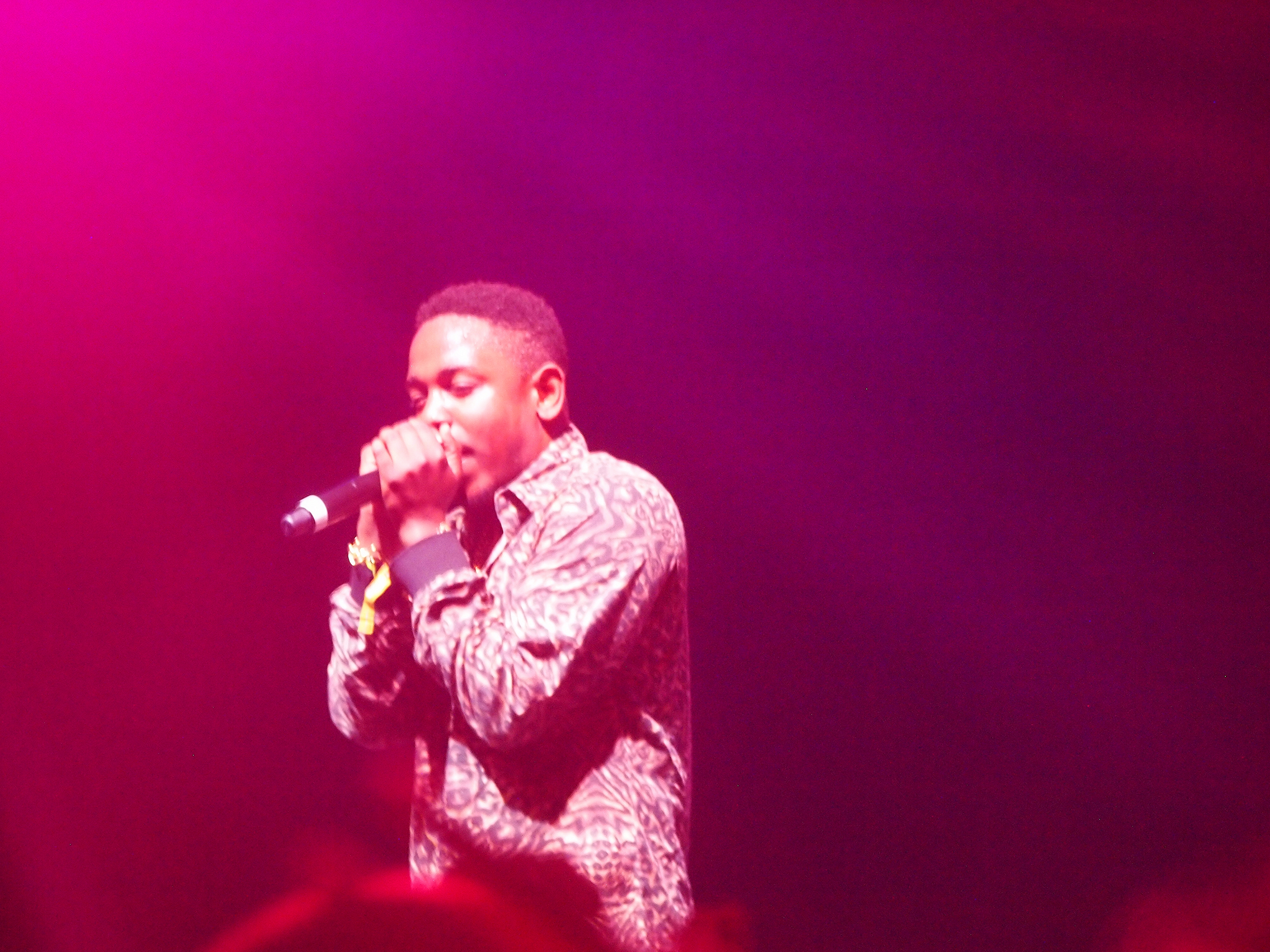
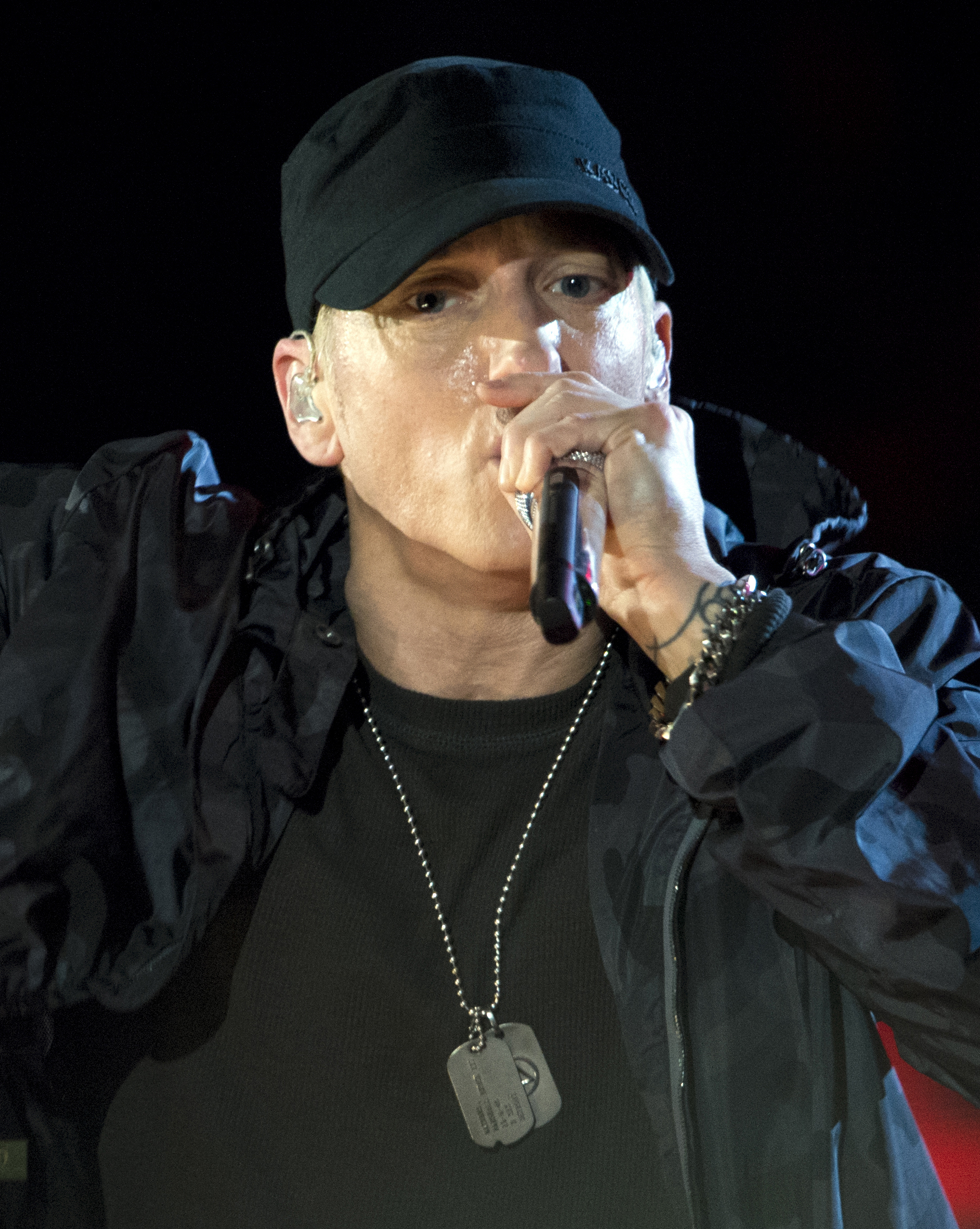
A Tribe Called Quest's We Got It from Here... Thank You 4 Your Service, Drake's More Life, Kendrick Lamar's Damn and Eminem's Revival were the only non-German albums on the chart in 2017.

Issue date	Album	Artist(s)	Ref.
6 January	Palmen aus Plastik	Bonez MC & RAF Camora	
13 January	We Got It from Here... Thank You 4 Your Service	A Tribe Called Quest	
20 January	Cobra	Bosca	
27 January	Anarchie und Alltag	Antilopen Gang	
3 February	Allé allé	Soufian	
10 February	Makarov Komplex	Capital Bra	
17 February	Auge des Tigers	Majoe	
24 February	Instinkt	Kianush	
3 March	2ahltag: RIOT	Bass Sultan Hengzt	
10 March	Advanced Chemistry	Beginner	
17 March	Ich und mein Bruder	Mädness & Döll	
24 March	More Life	Drake	
31 March	Kohldampf	Maxwell	
7 April	Vision	Kurdo	
14 April	Pusha	18 Karat	
21 April	Mele7	Zuna	
28 April	Damn	Kendrick Lamar	
5 May	Gute Nacht	Kontra K	
12 May	A.S.S.N	AK Ausserkontrolle	
19 May	Sabr	Mudi	
26 May	Das nullte Kapitel	Käptn Peng & die Tentakel von Delphi	
2 June	Roswell	Marteria	
9 June	Leben am Limit	SXTN	
16 June	Black Friday	Bushido	
23 June	Maximum	KC Rebell & Summer Cem	
30 June	Verloren im Paradies	PA Sports	
7 July	Epic	Fler & Jalil	
14 July	Alles auf Rot	Capo	
21 July	Sampler 4	187 Strassenbande	
28 July	Sampler 4	187 Strassenbande	
4 August	Sampler 4	187 Strassenbande	
11 August	Sampler 4	187 Strassenbande	
18 August	Herz	Moses Pelham	
25 August	Cold Summer	Seyed	
1 September	Anthrazit	RAF Camora	
8 September	Lang lebe der Tod	Casper	
15 September	tru.	Cro	
22 September	Blanco	Kurdo & Majoe	
29 September	Kunde ist König	Mert	
6 October	Royal Bunker	Savas & Sido	
13 October	Royal Bunker	Savas & Sido	
20 October	Casia	Miami Yacine	
27 October	TP4L	Trailerpark	
3 November	Diaspora	Celo & Abdi	
10 November	Nichts war umsonst	Prinz Pi	
17 November	Neue Deutsche Quelle	Sa4	
24 November	Eiskalt	Luciano	
1 December	Alternative für Deutschland	Favorite	
8 December	Jung Brutal Gutaussehend 3	Kollegah & Farid Bang	
15 December	Jung Brutal Gutaussehend 3	Kollegah & Farid Bang	
22 December	Revival	Eminem	
29 December	Revival	Eminem	
