= List of number-one hip-hop albums of 2015 (Germany) =

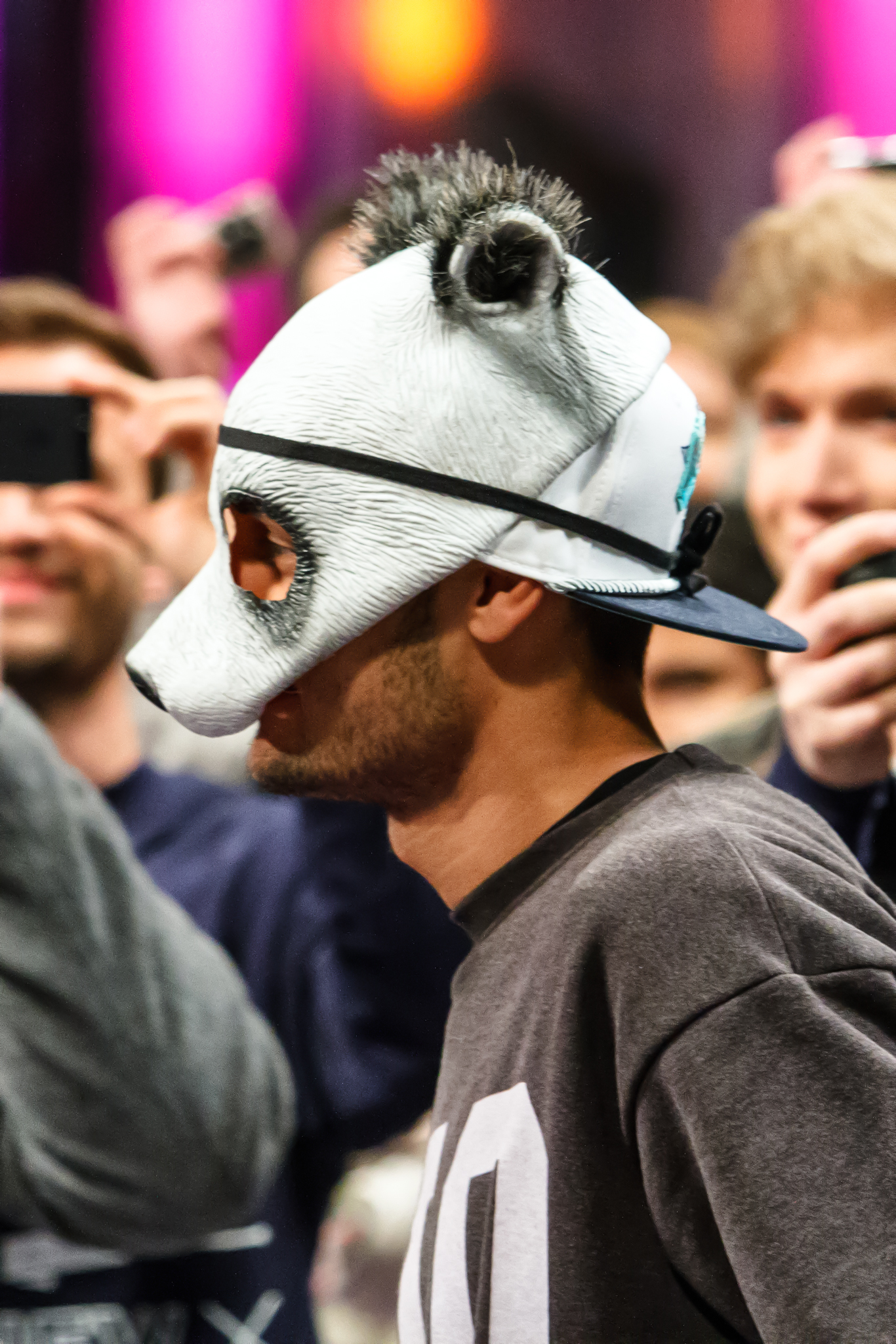
Cro's live album MTV Unplugged topped the charts for six non-consecutive weeks.

The official German hip-hop album charts are record charts compiled by GfK Entertainment GmbH on behalf of Bundesverband Musikindustrie (Federal Association of Phonographic Industry). The hip-hop charts only include albums and were introduced on 1 April 2015. The chart week runs from Friday to Thursday with the official chart being published on the following Monday. The charts are based on sales of physical albums from retail outlets as well as permanent music downloads and streaming.

In 2015, 27 albums reached the top of the chart.

== Chart history ==
Issue date	Album	Artist(s)	Ref.
27 March	Normaler Samt	Audio88 & Yassin	
3 April	What's Goes?	Die Orsons	
10 April	Asphalt Massaka 3	Farid Bang	
17 April	Löwenkind	Liont	
24 April	Asphalt Massaka 3	Farid Bang	
1 May	Plaktonweed Tape	Spongebozz	
8 May	Baba aller Babas	Xatar	
15 May	Achter Tag	Genetikk	
22 May	Achter Tag	Genetikk	
29 May	Züruck in die Zukunst	SDP	
5 June	Glück ohne Scherben	Ferris MC	
12 June	Fette Unterhaltung	Ali Bumaye	
19 June	Fata Morgana	KC Rebell	
26 June	Mama	MoTrip	
3 July	Fata Morgana	KC Rebell	
10 July	MTV Unplugged	Cro	
17 July	Hurra die Welt geht unter	K.I.Z	
24 July	MTV Unplugged	Cro	
31 July	MTV Unplugged	Cro	
7 August	MTV Unplugged	Cro	
14 August	MTV Unplugged	Cro	
21 August	MTV Unplugged	Cro	
28 August	Compton	Dr. Dre	
4 September	Killemall	Manuellsen	
11 September	VI	Sido	
18 September	Weil die Straße nicht vergisst	Frank White	
25 September	VI	Sido	
2 October	Strassencocktail	Olexesh	
9 October	VI	Sido	
16 October	Chronik III	Selfmade Records	
23 October	Breiter als 2 Türsteher	Majoe	
30 October	VI	Sido	
6 November	VI	Sido	
13 November	Cla$$ic	Bushido & Shindy	
20 November	Cla$$ic	Bushido & Shindy	
27 November	Ultraviolett II	Metrickz	
4 December	Musik ist keine Lösung	Alligatoah	
11 December	Der Staat gegen Patrick Decker	Fler	
18 December	Zuhältertape Vol. 4	Kollegah	
25 December	Zuhältertape Vol. 4	Kollegah	
