= Sturmmaske auf (Intro) =

Single by Kollegah and Farid Bang

from the album Jung Brutal Gutaussehend 3
- Language: German
- Released: 28 September 2017
- Recorded: 2017
- Genre: Gangsta rap
- Length: 3:52
- Label: Alpha Music Empire; Banger Musik; BMG
- Songwriter(s): Kollegah; Farid Bang
- Producer(s): Joznez; Johnny Illstrument

Kollegah singles chronology
"Millenium" (2017)	"Sturmmaske auf (Intro)" (2017)	"Zieh' den Rucksack aus" (2017)

Farid Bang singles chronology
"Creed" (2016)	"Sturmmaske auf (Intro)" (2017)	"Zieh' den Rucksack aus" (2017)

Music video
- "Sturmmaske auf" on YouTube

"Sturmmaske auf (Intro)" ("Ski mask on") is a song recorded by German rappers Kollegah and Farid Bang for their third collaborative studio album Jung Brutal Gutaussehend 3 (2017). The single was made available for download and streaming on 28 September 2017 through Alpha Music Empire, Banger Musik and BMG. "Sturmmaske auf (Intro)" was written by Kollegah and Farid Bang, while production was handled by German producers Joznez and Johnny Illstrument.

== Background and composition ==
"Sturmmaske auf"
A 14-second sample of "Sturmmaske auf"

On 21 September 2017 Kollegah and Farid Bang announced the single on their Instagram and Facebook accounts.

"Sturmmaske auf (Intro)" was digitally released on 28 September 2017 through Alpha Music Empire, Banger Musik and BMG as the first single of Kollegah's and Farid Bang's third collaborative studio album, Jung Brutal Gutaussehend 3. It was written by the duo while production was handled by German producer Joznez, along with additional production from Johnny Illstrument.

A "gangsta rap" song, "Sturmmaske auf (Intro)" features a violin-choir-beat and aggressive lyrics.

== Track listing ==
- Digital download
1. "Sturmmaske auf (Intro)" – 3:52

== Charts ==
Chart (2017)	Peak position
Austria (Ö3 Austria Top 40)	6
Germany (GfK)	1
Switzerland (Schweizer Hitparade)	15
