= 0815 (song) =

2017 German rap song

Song by Kollegah and Farid Bang

from the album Jung Brutal Gutaussehend 3
- Language: German
- Written: Kollegah and Farid Bang
- Released: 2017
- Genre: Gangsta rap, battle rap
- Length: 2:47
- Producers: Juh-Dee and Miksu

"0815" is a song by German rappers Kollegah and Farid Bang released in 2017. It is included exclusively on the bonus EP §185 included with the box set of their third collaborative album Jung Brutal Gutaussehend 3 (JBG 3).

The song was written by the performers themselves and produced by Juh-Dee and Miksu. In 2018, lines from the lyrics and the nomination of the album for the Echo Music Prize triggered a discussion about antisemitism and the harshness of the text as well as the question of how far artistic freedom should reach.

== Content ==
0815 belongs to the hip-hop subgenres of gangsta and battle rap. The instrumentation brings forth a gloomy song consisting mainly of hard beats and snares as well as a consistently looped chorus sample. As for the rappers, the two performers rap provocative, brutal, or exaggerated lines using multisyllabic rhyme schemes, comparisons, homophones, and other rhetorical stylistic devices; as is typical of the genre, these mostly follow the scheme of stylizing themselves positively and the listener negatively. There is also a certain harshness and ruthlessness on the part of the artists, as suggested by the display of various illegal activities (violence against women, sexual violence, and drug trafficking).

There are also side swipes on the song at German musicians Bushido („Komplette Zerfickung für Anis Ferchichi“ – "Complete fucking to pieces for Anis Ferchichi"), Ali Bumaye („keiner von uns kann Ali Huckepack heben“ – "none of us can piggyback Ali"), Marcus Staiger („Hurensohn“ – "son of a bitch"), MOK („ist nur 'n Running Gag“ – "is just a running gag"), Jennifer Rostock („schwingt nach 'ner Schelle den Kochtopf“ – "swings the cooking pot after a cuff"), Sido („Sidos Schwestern geb ich's hardcore“ – "I give Sido's sisters hardcore") and Sierra Kidd („Schnips' Zigarren in Sierras Face“ – "flick cigars in Sierra's face"); Neutral mentions are made of rapper Sinan-G and hip-hop duo Genetikk.

== Reception ==
Although 0815 was not a commercial success and is only included on the §185 EP included with the box set to the main album, it received the most media attention of any song on the work and is considered its most controversial track. In particular, Farid Bang's line „Mein Körper definierter als von Auschwitzinsassen“ ("My body more defined than from Auschwitz inmates"), which has been falsely attributed to Kollegah on several occasions, has been widely judged to be particularly severe and distasteful and has been cited in the majority of articles about the song.

0815 was one of four total songs from the box set that were indexed by the Federal Department for Media Harmful to Young Persons on List A in September 2018. Farid Bang called the trial "fair". In addition, proceedings for incitement of the people were initiated against the two performers due to the lyric line that had become a scandal, but a decision was made in favor of the defendants – the work was vulgar, but not legally punishable.

In a study by the Germanists Sven Bloching and Jöran Landschoff, the notorious line was seen as a breach of taboo rather than structural antisemitism, even though the work as a whole would glorify violence and sexism.

Following the accusations of antisemitism, Kollegah and Farid Bang visited the Auschwitz concentration camp memorial in June 2018. Kollegah then publicly distanced himself from antisemitism and promised never to rap about the topic again.
