= 0815 =

0815 or 08/15 may refer to:

- 08/15 (film series), a 1954–55 West German film trilogy directed by Paul May
  - 08/15 (film), the first film in the trilogy
- "0815" (song), 2017, by German rappers Kollegah and Farid Bang
- MG 08/15, a machine gun used by the Imperial German Army during World War I
  - 08/15, a slang German term meaning "standard-issue"
