= List of number-one hip-hop albums of 2016 (Germany) =

The official German hip hop album charts are record charts compiled by GfK Entertainment GmbH on behalf of Bundesverband Musikindustrie (Federal Association of Phonographic Industry). The hip-hop charts only include albums and were introduced on 1 April 2015. The chart week runs from Friday to Thursday with the official chart being published on the following Monday. The charts are based on sales of physical albums from retail outlets as well as permanent music downloads and streaming.

== Chart history ==
Issue date	Album	Artist(s)	Ref.
1 January	Zuhältertape Vol. 4	Kollegah	
8 January	Zuhältertape Vol. 4	Kollegah	
15 January	Born 2 B-Tight	B-Tight	
22 January	Leben II	Azad	
29 January	Cemesis	Summer Cem	
5 February	0,9	Ssio	
12 February	Im Westen nix neues	Prinz Pi	
19 February	Im Westen nix neues	Prinz Pi	
26 February	Verbrecher aus der Wüste	Kurdo	
4 March	This Unruly Mess I've Made	Macklemore & Ryan Lewis	
11 March	Regenmacher	Megaloh	
18 March	This Unruly Mess I've Made	Macklemore & Ryan Lewis	
25 March	Wenn kommt dann kommt	Jasko	
1 April	Gauna	Nate57	
8 April	Euphoria	Ali As	
15 April	Zwei	Ok Kid	
22 April	Ghøst	RAF Camora	
29 April	Freezy	Eko Fresh	
6 May	Berühme letzte Worte	Samy Deluxe	
13 May	Mutterficker	Frauenarzt	
20 May	Turbo	Karate Andi	
27 May	Labyrinth	Kontra K	
3 June	High & Hungrig 2	Gzuz & Bonez MC	
10 June	Engel mit der AK	Seyed	
17 June	Noah	Chakuza	
24 June	High & Hungrig 2	Gzuz & Bonez MC	
1 July	High & Hungrig 2	Gzuz & Bonez MC	
8 July	Mikrokosmos	257ers	
15 July	Predigt	MC Bomber	
22 July	Mikrokosmos	257ers	
29 July	Mikrokosmos	257ers	
5 August	High & Hungrig 2	Gzuz & Bonez MC	
12 August	High & Hungrig 2	Gzuz & Bonez MC	
19 August	Der Holland Job	Coup	
26 August	Bang Bang	HB13	
2 September	Advanced Chemistry	Beginner	
9 September	Vibe	Fler	
16 September	Palmen aus Plastik	Bonez MC & RAF Camora	
23 September	Haramstufe Rot	Hanybal	
30 September	Palmen aus Plastik	Bonez MC & RAF Camora	
7 October	Gangland	Manuellsen	
14 October	Bei Fame hört Freundschaft auf	Fard	
21 October	Palmen aus Plastik	Bonez MC & RAF Camora	
28 October	Makadem	Olexesh	
4 November	Essahdamus	Kool Savas	
11 November	Hydra 3D	Dat Adam	
18 November	Dreams	Shindy	
25 November	Das goldene Album	Sido	
2 December	Abstand	KC Rebell	
9 December	Fukk Genetikk	Genetikk	
16 December	Imperator	Kollegah	
23 December	Palmen aus Plastik	Bonez MC & RAF Camora	
30 December	Imperator	Kollegah	
