= §185 =

EP by Kollegah and Farid Bang
- Released: 1 December 2017
- Recorded: 2017
- Genre: German hip hop
- Length: 15:30
- Label: Alpha Music Empire; Banger Musik; BMG

§185 is the first collaborative EP by German rappers Kollegah and Farid Bang, released on 1 December 2017 by Alpha Music Empire, Banger Musik, and BMG. The EP was exclusively distributed through the limited box set of their third collaborative studio album Jung Brutal Gutaussehend 3.

== Background ==
In September 2017, Kollegah and Farid Bang announced the release date of third collaborative studio album, Jung Brutal Gutaussehend 3. They announced in early October 2017 that the limited box set will include a limited EP. The track list was revealed on 20 October 2017.

== Track listing ==
Credits for §185 adapted from the booklet:

No.	Title	Music	Length
1.	"Ja ich will"	Juh-Dee	2:46
2.	"0815"	Juh-Dee; Joshimixu	2:47
3.	"Minotaurusnacken"	Abaz; Clay Beatz	2:55
4.	"Drecksjob"	B-Case; HNDRC	3:22
5.	"Ghettosuperstars 2"	David; Eli	3:40
Total length:			15:30
