= Jung, brutal, gutaussehend =

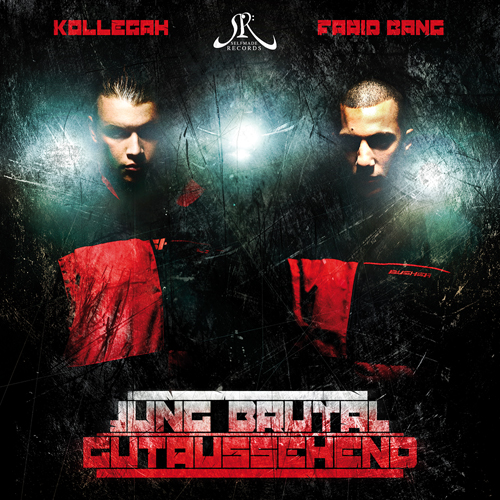

Studio album by Kollegah and Farid Bang
- Released: 19 June 2009
- Genre: German hip hop
- Label: Selfmade Records

Kollegah chronology
Kollegah (2008)	Jung, brutal, gutaussehend (2009)	Zuhältertape Vol. 3 (2009)

Farid Bang chronology
Asphalt Massaka (2008)	Jung, brutal, gutaussehend (2009)	Asphalt Massaka 2 (2010)

Cover of the steelbox
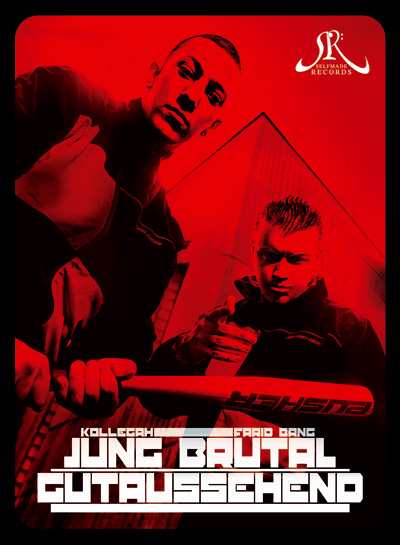

Jung, brutal, gutaussehend ("Young, violent, handsome") is the first collaborative studio album by German rappers Kollegah and Farid Bang. It was released on 19 June 2009 through Selfmade Records.

Two follow-ups, Jung, brutal, gutaussehend 2 and 3, were released in 2013 and 2017, respectively.

== Background ==
Farid Bang explained after the release of his debut album Asphalt Massaka in 2008 that he won't record an album in 2009. Kollegah also confirmed not to record for his own. Later, many rumors were on the internet saying that both rappers had teamed up to record an album together. Following these rumors, Farid Bang appealed to Kollegah the idea of recording an album. Both rappers subsequently began working on their album in spite of their previous statements.

The finishing process of the album took three months.

Singer Billy13 was the only guest appearance on the album that had been involved in the production. She got involved because of her good relationship to Farid Bang. She sings the hookline of the song "Butterfly". Billy13 is also known for her past collaboration with German rapper Bushido.

Jung, brutal, gutaussehend released as a standard and a "Steelbox Edition". The latter was limited to 1,500 copies and could only be purchased via Amazon. The box features the album, a T-shirt, an autograph card signed by Kollegah and Farid Bang, a poster, and a bonus CD with a new song, titled "Miami Vice".

=== Reception ===
In his review for laut.de, Max Brandl gave Jung, brutal, gutaussehend two out of five possible points and considered it much worse than Kollegah's previous solo albums (Alphagene and Kollegah), saying his contributions on Jung, brutal, gutaussehend were "nearly disastrous". The instrumentals were all judged negatively, except for the beats to "Schwarzgeld", "Mitternacht" and "Der Härteste im Land". Overall, the cooperation of Farid Bang and Kollegah did not work well: "Not that both would steal the show from each other – unfortunately no. Both forfeit their particular strengths." Furthermore, Brandl criticized Kollegah's arrogant talk. As a result of dissing other German rappers such as Samy Deluxe, Farid Bang would irritate and seem embarrassing. Despite all the negative criticism, Kollegah would show in songs like "Banger und Boss" or "Die Härtesten im Land" that he remains one of the best rappers in Germany and that publishing a solo album in 2010 would more reasonable for both Farid Bang and Kollegah.

The desk of Rap.de noted that the multifacetedness of Jung, brutal, gutaussehend can also be seen positively because the album would be "uncompromising" and thus counter the zeitgeist. The tracks "Banger und Boss" and "Sonnenbank Pimps" have been emphasized positively due to the double time skills of both rappers. The tracks "Alphamassaka", "Flaschen auf die Türsteher" and "Crime Time", as well as the contribution of Billy13, whose voice did not fit into the context of the album, were evaluated negatively by the editors. Farid Bang would sound like Kollegah most intensive, regarding to his flow and lyrical comparisons. Kollegah would rap entertaining and well-made verses but still, they can not reach the high level of his previous albums.

The hip hop magazine Backspin rated three out of five possible rating points to the album. The two rappers would fulfill the low expectations that came up before the release due to the low thematic variety. Although there is not much substance, Farid Bang and Kollegah still "entertain on a high level". Backspin ascribes this to the humorous lyrical comparisons. According to the opinion of Backspin the tracks "Gangbanger", "Die Härtesten im Land" and "Jung, brutal, gutaussehend" are the best tracks of the album. Finally, they have stated that the audience should not take the album tracks too seriously.

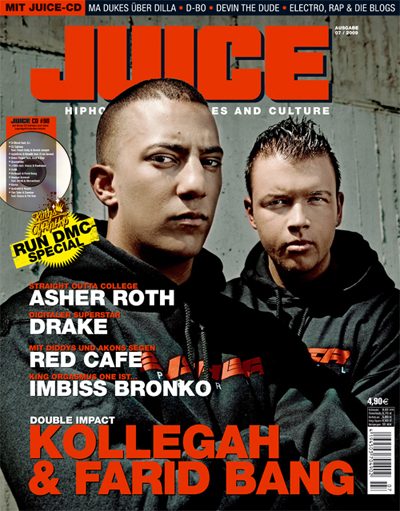
Kollegah and Farid Bang on the cover of the July 2009 issue of Juice

The album received positive feedback from the magazine Juice. The album would unite "the best of both ganglands". Especially Kollegah's verse in "Gangbanger" was praised that its lyric would be so technically advanced, as it is almost never in German rap. However, what turns out more negative are the opinions on Farid Bang's double-time verse, the contribution of Billy13 and the less variety of composition. All in all, the album is, however, "one of the best German rap albums in the first half of 2009". The desks' final rating is four and a half out of six possible crowns.

=== Banning ===
In June 2012, Jung, brutal, gutaussehend was "indexed" by the Federal Department for Media Harmful to Young Persons (BPjM), meaning that sale to minors in Germany and advertising is no longer possible. Petra Meier, deputy chairman of the BPjM, mentioned the reasons for the indexing such as "the views expressed in these songs that are dramatic depictions of violence". The federal agency had to "balance between the art of freedom […] and youth protection", but saw "youth protection issues as a priority".

== Track listing ==
No.	Title	Producer(s)	Length
1.	"Intro"	Vizir	2:23
2.	"Ghettosuperstars"	Rizbo	4:17
3.	"Banger und Boss" (Banger and boss)	Woroc	3:41
4.	"Flaschen auf den Türsteher" (Throwing bottles at the doorman)	Joshimixu	3:49
5.	"Sonnenbank Pimps" (Sunbed pimps)	CeeJay Beats	3:16
6.	"Alphamassaka"	Rizbo	3:54
7.	"Gangbanger"	Rooq	2:58
8.	"Schwarzgeld" (Black money)	Woroc	4:01
9.	"Mitternacht" (Midnight)	Woroc	3:41
10.	"Die Härtesten im Land" (The toughest guys in the country)	Woroc	3:22
11.	"Wir ficken ein paar Bonzen" (Fucking some fat cats)	Rizbo	3:54
12.	"Die Straße kuckt zu" (The streets are watching)	ILLthinker (from Niemehr4Free Beats)	3:50
13.	"Butterfly" (featuring Billy13)	Rizbo	3:33
14.	"Crime Time"	Bjet	4:08
15.	"Jung, brutal, gutaussehend" (Young, violent, handsome)	Rizbo	4:21

Steelbox edition
No.	Title	Producer(s)	Length
16.	"Miami Vice"	Bjet	3:51

Samples

- "Mitternacht" contains a sample of Pyotr Ilyich Tchaikovsky's "Dance of the Four Little Swans".
- "Ghettosuperstars" samples the song "Watchful Eye" by Brian Bennett.
- "Gangbanger" samples the song "Eternity" by Stratovarius.
- "Jung, brutal, gutaussehend" samples the "Song of the Plains" by the Alexandrov Ensemble.
- "Miami Vice" samples the song "Frederick" by Patti Smith.
- "Intro" samples the "Love Theme from The Godfather" by Nino Rota.
