= Asphalt Massaka =

Studio album by Farid Bang
- Released: 4 July 2008
- Genres: Hip hop, battle rap
- Label: Selfmade Records

Farid Bang chronology
Asphalt Massaka (2008)	Jung, brutal, gutaussehend (2009)

Asphalt Massaka is the debut album by German rapper Farid Bang. It released on 4 July 2008 over German Dream Entertainment. The feature part of "Mein Block" was changed in the 2015 re-release and digital release from Deso Dogg to a new part by the rapper Jasko.

== Musical style ==
The album contains mainly battle rap tracks and diss tracks, including "Asphalt Massaka" and "Der Härteste im Land". Except for "Zweimal im Leben", a storytelling track, and "Jüngste Tag", a thoughtful song.

According to an interview with Toxik from hiphop.de, Farid Bang explained that his disses and insults towards some German rappers are only to be taken "sportive".

== Track listing ==
No.	Title	Producer(s)	Length
1.	"Intro"	CeeJay Beats	3:17
2.	"Wer ist Düsseldorf" (Who is Düsseldorf)	CeeJay Beats	3:42
3.	"Der Araber" (The arabian, featuring Moemusic)	Juh-Dee	3:36
4.	"Der Tag der Toten" (The day of the dead, featuring Billy 13)	Firuz	3:35
5.	"Asphalt Massaka"	CeeJay Beats	4:12
6.	"Ich geh auf 4" (I go on 4, featuring Eko Fresh)	Niemehr4free Betas	4:27
7.	"Der Härteste im Land" (The hardness in the country)	Niemehr4free Betas	3:06
8.	"Mein Block" (My block, featuring Deso Dogg)	Kingsize	4:10
9.	"Zweimal im Leben" (Twice in life)	CeeJay Beats	4:25
10.	"Jüngste Tag" (Youngest day, featuring Billy 13 & Al-Gear)	CeeJay Beats	2:38
11.	"An die Wand" (On the wall, featuring G-Style)	Niemehr4free Betas	4:12
12.	"Bladi Musik" (featuring Capkekz)	CeeJay Beats	3:37
13.	"Gangsta leben kürzer" (Gangsters live shorter, featuring Eko Fresh & Tekken Bugatti)	Gee Futuristic & X-plosive Beats	4:03
14.	"Russisch Roulette" (Russian roulette, featuring Hakan Abi)	Niemehr4free Betas	3:48
15.	"Nutten wollen Bang" (Hooded want Bang, featuring Prodycem)	Prodycem	4:21
16.	"Hier kommt der Führer" (Here comes the leader)	Joshimixu	3:37
17.	"110" (featuring Summer Cem)	Juh-Dee	3:13
18.	"Outro"	CeeJay Beats	4:34

Samples

- "Wer ist Düsseldorf" contains a sample of "Seven Notes in Black" by The Vince Tempera Orchestra

== Marketing ==
A video was filmed for the track "An die Wand". This album didn´t rise in the charts.
