= Alphagene =

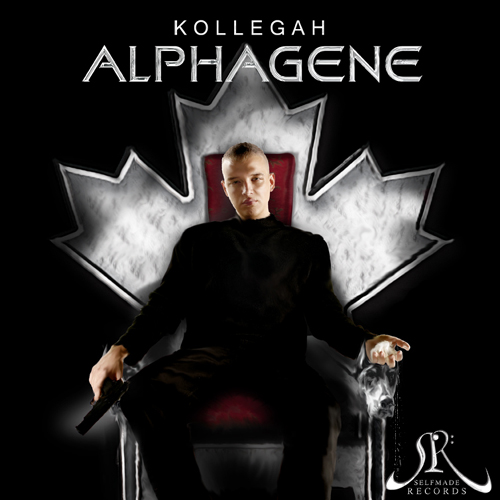

Studio album by Kollegah
- Released: 16 November 2007 (Germany)
- Genre: German hip hop
- Label: Selfmade Records
- Producer: Rizbo, Jimmy Ledrac, Vizir

Kollegah chronology
Boss der Bosse (2006)	Alphagene (2007)	Kollegah (2008)

Alphagene ("Alpha genes") is the debut studio album by German rapper Kollegah, released on 16 November 2007 through Selfmade Records. It charted in Germany, peaking at #51.

== History ==
After the release of his mixtape Boss der Bosse, Kollegah started to work on his debut album which had taken him nine months to finish. For six months he worked on his records so intensively that he had no contact to his family and friends during that time.

== Track listing ==
1. "Intro" – 2:31
  - Produced by: Rizbo
2. "Veni, Vidi, Vici" – 2:25
  - Produced by: Six June
3. "Alphagene" – 3:23
  - Produced by: JAW
4. "Showtime III" – 4:34
  - Produced by: Rizbo
5. "24/7" 3:55
  - Featuring: Sahin
  - Produced by: JAW
6. "Kuck auf die Goldkette 2007" – 3:51
  - Produced by: Rizbo
7. "Endlevel" – 4:34
  - Featuring: DeineLtan
  - Produced by: Rizbo
8. "Dealer" (Prelude) – 0:59
  - Produced by: JAW
9. "Vom Dealer zum Star" – 3:51
10. "Star" (Afterlude) – 2:29
  - Produced by: Vizir
11. "Der Boss hängt voll Gold" – 4:06
12. "Sie hassen uns" – 3:52
  - Featuring: Toony
13. "Alles was ich hab" – 3:47
  - Produced by: Rizbo
14. "Selfmade Endbosse" – 4:28
  - Featuring: Favorite
  - Produced by: Nace & Shalla
15. "Machomannstyle" – 3:57
  - Featuring: Bass Sultan Hengzt
  - Produced by: JAW
16. "Legenden" - 3:41
  - Featuring: K.I.Z
  - Produced by: Rizbo
17. "Der Einzelkämpfer" – 3:13
  - Produced by: Vizir
18. "Ein Junge weint hier nicht" – 4:25
  - Featuring: Slick One & Tarek of K.I.Z
  - Produced by: Rizbo
19. "Pokerfacekönig" – 4:15
  - Produced by: Jimmy Ledrac
20. "Outro" – 3:46
  - Produced by: JAW
