= Es ist geil ein Arschloch zu sein =

2000 single by Christian

Single by Christian

from the album Nominator
- Language: German
- English title: "It's Cool to Be an Asshole"
- B-side: "Badman"
- Released: 13 November 2000
- Recorded: 2000
- Length: 3:58 (album version); 3:38 (radio version)
- Label: Hansa; BMG Berlin
- Songwriter: Steve van Velvet
- Producer: Bülent Aris

Christian singles chronology
"Es ist geil ein Arschloch zu sein" (2000)	"Was kostet die Welt" (2001)

"Es ist geil ein Arschloch zu sein" (English: "It's Cool to Be an Asshole") is a song by German singer and Big Brother Germany contestant Christian. Following his brief and controversial tenure on the programme, Christian quit the show and capitalised on his notoriety in Germany to record the track, which was written by Steve van Velvet and produced by Bülent Aris in Hamburg, Germany.

Hansa Records and BMG Berlin issued the song as Christian's debut single on 13 November 2000. It was a commercial success in German-speaking Europe, peaking atop the German Singles Chart for eight weeks in 2000 and 2001 while becoming a top-10 hit in Austria and Switzerland. The song is certified platinum in Germany for shipping over 500,000 units and was the 40th-most-success hit of the 2000s decade there.

== Background ==
In 2000, 28-year-old Christian was cast as a housemate on the German incarnation of the reality television programme Big Brother for its second series. Shortly after the series started, he designated himself the "Nominator" and displayed rude behaviour toward the other contestants, especially Hanka Rackwitz, and talked about himself narcissistically while also attracting criticism for his bad acting. After a month, he left the show, but his snarky attitude had left an impression across Germany. Using his popularity as a springboard, Christian recorded and released his debut single, "Es ist geil ein Arschloch zu sein", soon after he departed the programme.

== Release and reception ==
The only commercial format released, a CD single, contains three tracks: the radio edit of "Es ist geil ein Arschloch zu sein", a "Nominator" version of the song, and an extra B-side track titled "Badman". Hansa Records and BMG Berlin issued the CD across German-speaking Europe on 13 November 2000. The single immediately debuted atop the German Singles Chart on 27 November, remaining at number one for eight consecutive weeks, until 29 January 2001, when it slipped to number two. Afterwards, the song spent seven more weeks in the top 100 before leaving the chart. "Arschloch" was Germany's 45th-most-successful single of 2000 and the 29th-most-successful single of 2001, shipping over 500,000 copies to earn a platinum sales certification from the Bundesverband Musikindustrie (BVMI). In 2009, the song was ranked at number 40 on the German decade-end chart.

The song also charted in Austria and Switzerland. In the former country, "Arschloch" debuted at number 17 on 3 December 2000. After remaining at that position for another week, the song gradually rose up the Ö3 Austria Top 40 until peaking at number three on 28 January 2001. It then spent eight more weeks on the chart, totalling 16 weeks within the top 75, the most weeks out of all the countries in which it charted. At the end of 2001, Ö3 ranked the song at number 23 on their year-end ranking. Seven days after its Austrian debut, "Arschloch" appeared on the Swiss Singles Chart at number 40. The single rose and fell over the next three issues, reaching its peak of number seven during its fifth week on the chart, on 14 January 2001. Afterwards, the song descended the listing and left the top 100 after 14 weeks, ending 2001 as Switzerland's 85th-best-selling single. On the Eurochart Hot 100, the song reached number nine on 20 January 2001, finishing the year as Europe's 71st-most-successful track.

== Credits and personnel ==
Credits are lifted from the CD single liner notes.

Studios

- Produced and mixed at Studio Planet 4 (Hamburg, Germany)
- Nominator mix remixed at Studio Planet 3 (Hamburg, Germany)

Personnel

- Steve van Velvet – music and lyrics
- Christian – vocals
- Bülent Aris – production, mixing, music and lyrics ("Badman")
- Ronald Reinsberg – artwork
- F.L. Lange – photography
- Dirk van Gercum – music ("Badman")
- Lukas Loules – lyrics ("Badman")
- Hayo Panarinfo – lyrics ("Badman")

== Charts ==
=== Weekly charts ===
Chart (2000–2001)	Peak position
Austria (Ö3 Austria Top 40)	3
Europe (Eurochart Hot 100)	9
Germany (GfK)	1
Switzerland (Schweizer Hitparade)	7

=== Decade-end charts ===
Chart (2000–2009)	Position
Germany (Media Control GfK)	40

=== Year-end charts ===
Chart (2000)	Position
Germany (Media Control)	45

Chart (2001)	Position
Austria (Ö3 Austria Top 40)	23
Europe (Eurochart Hot 100)	71
Germany (Media Control)	29
Switzerland (Schweizer Hitparade)	85

== Certifications ==
Region	Certification	Certified units/sales
Germany (BVMI)	Platinum	500,000^{^}
^{^} Shipments figures based on certification alone.
