= Banger leben kürzer =

Studio album by Farid Bang
- Released: 18 February 2011
- Recorded: German Dream Studio
- Genres: Rap, hip hop
- Length: 59:05 (Standard); 67:11 (MZEE version)
- Label: 313 JWP

Farid Bang chronology
Asphalt Massaka 2 (2010)	Banger leben kürzer (2011)	Der letzte Tag deines Lebens (2012)

Banger leben kürzer (German for "Bangers live shorter") is the third album by German rapper Farid Bang, released on 18 February 2011 by German Dream.

AllMusic stated in its review of the album, "it certainly is a continuation of that 2010 album, even though there's a slightly stronger emphasis on storytelling this time around."

== Music ==
The album contains many gangsta rap songs such as "Du Fils de Pute", "Bitte Spitte 5000" und "Willkommen auf der Kö"). Deep-themed songs such as "Teufelskreis" and "Dreh die Zeit zurück" can be found more often, than on his previous releases. The title song is a diss track aimed at Sido.

== Track listing ==
No.	Title	Producer(s)	Length
1.	"Intro"	B-Case & KD-Beatz	1:57
2.	"Du Fils de Pute" (French: You son of a bitch, featuring Raf Camora)	phreQuincy	4:44
3.	"3 mal im Leben" (Three times in life)	TheDrumkidz	3:49
4.	"Teufelskreis" (Vicious circle)	Crystal & HookBeatz	4:22
5.	"Mein Mann ist ein Gangster" (My man is a gangster, featuring Zemine)	Raf Camora	4:14
6.	"Bitte Spitte 5000" (Please spit 5000)	Crystal & HookBeatz	3:53
7.	"Neureiche Wichser (NRW)" (New-rich wankers, featuring Summer Cem & Fard)	B-Case & Joznez	4:24
8.	"Ein Stich genügt" (One stab is enough, featuring Habesha & Haftbefehl)	Sti	4:01
9.	"Banger leben kürzer" (Bangers live shorter)	ILLthinker	4:20
10.	"Hol die Hände aus der Tasche" (Put your hands out of the pocket, featuring Afrob & Eko Fresh)	ILLthinker	3:23
11.	"Spiel ohne Regeln" (Game without rules)	Juh-Dee	4:39
12.	"Mensch" (Human, featuring Delus)	Rizbo	3:49
13.	"Willkommen auf der Kö" (Welcome to the Kö)	B-Case	3:43
14.	"König der Nacht" (King of the night, featuring Ramsi Aliani)	Juh-Dee	4:15
15.	"Dreh die Zeit zurück" (Turn the time back)	ILLthinker	3:32

MZEE version (bonus songs)
No.	Title	Length
16.	"Lady Gaga Flow"	3:36
17.	"Goodfella Übernahme" (Goodfella Takeover, Remix featuring Haftbefehl, Summer Cem, Capkekz, Massiv & Eko Fresh)	4:30
