= Asphalt Massaka 2 =

Studio album by Farid Bang
- Released: 12 March 2010
- Genres: Rap, battle rap
- Label: 313

Farid Bang chronology
| Jung, brutal, gutaussehend (2009) | Asphalt Massaka 2 (2010) | Banger leben kürzer (2011) |

Asphalt Massaka 2 is the second album by German rapper Farid Bang. The album was released on 12 March 2010 on the label 313 JWP.

== Musical style ==
Many songs contain disses towards other German rap artists, such as Fler, B-Tight, Die Sekte and Franky Kubrick. However, the album also contains storytelling tracks like "Vom Tellerwäscher zum Millionär" and "Schwer ein Mann zu sein" and even a serious track titled "Noch einmal", in which Farid Bang reflects his life and property lists, which he would gladly do again.

== Track listing ==
| No. | Title | Producer(s) | Length |
|---|---|---|---|
| 1. | "Intro" | Joshimixu | 3:08 |
| 2. | "Banger Musik" (featuring G-Style) | Illthinker | 3:23 |
| 3. | "Immernoch ein Bastard" (Still a bastard, featuring Eko Fresh) | Juh Dee | 3:44 |
| 4. | "Es ist soweit" (It's time, featuring Summer Cem) | Juh Dee | 4:18 |
| 5. | "Vom Tellerwäscher zum Millionär" (Rags-to-riches, featuring Layouna) | Juh Dee | 3:56 |
| 6. | "Goodfella" | Joshimixu | 4:30 |
| 7. | "Stress ohne Grund" (Stress without reason, featuring Summer Cem) | Illthinker | 2:58 |
| 8. | "Gangsta Musik" (featuring Bass Sultan Hengzt) | Rizbo | 3:55 |
| 9. | "Schwer ein Mann zu sein" (Hard to be a man, featuring Manuellsen) | Decay | 4:15 |
| 10. | "Ich bin Düsseldorf" (I am Düsseldorf) | Kingstrumentals | 3:40 |
| 11. | "Gangbanger 2" (featuring Al-Gear) | Rizbo | 4:14 |
| 12. | "Wer will Beef" (Who wants beef) | | 4:32 |
| 13. | "Klick klick boom" (featuring Capkekz & Al-Gear) | Abaz | 4:24 |
| 14. | "Ey yo" (featuring Kollegah) | Rizbo | 3:50 |
| 15. | "Noch einmal" (Once again) | Illthinker | 3:55 |

== Marketing ==
Asphalt Massaka 2 reached chart position #56 in the German charts. Two music videos for "Es ist soweit" and "Gangsta Musik" were shot.
