= Genetikk =

German hip hop group

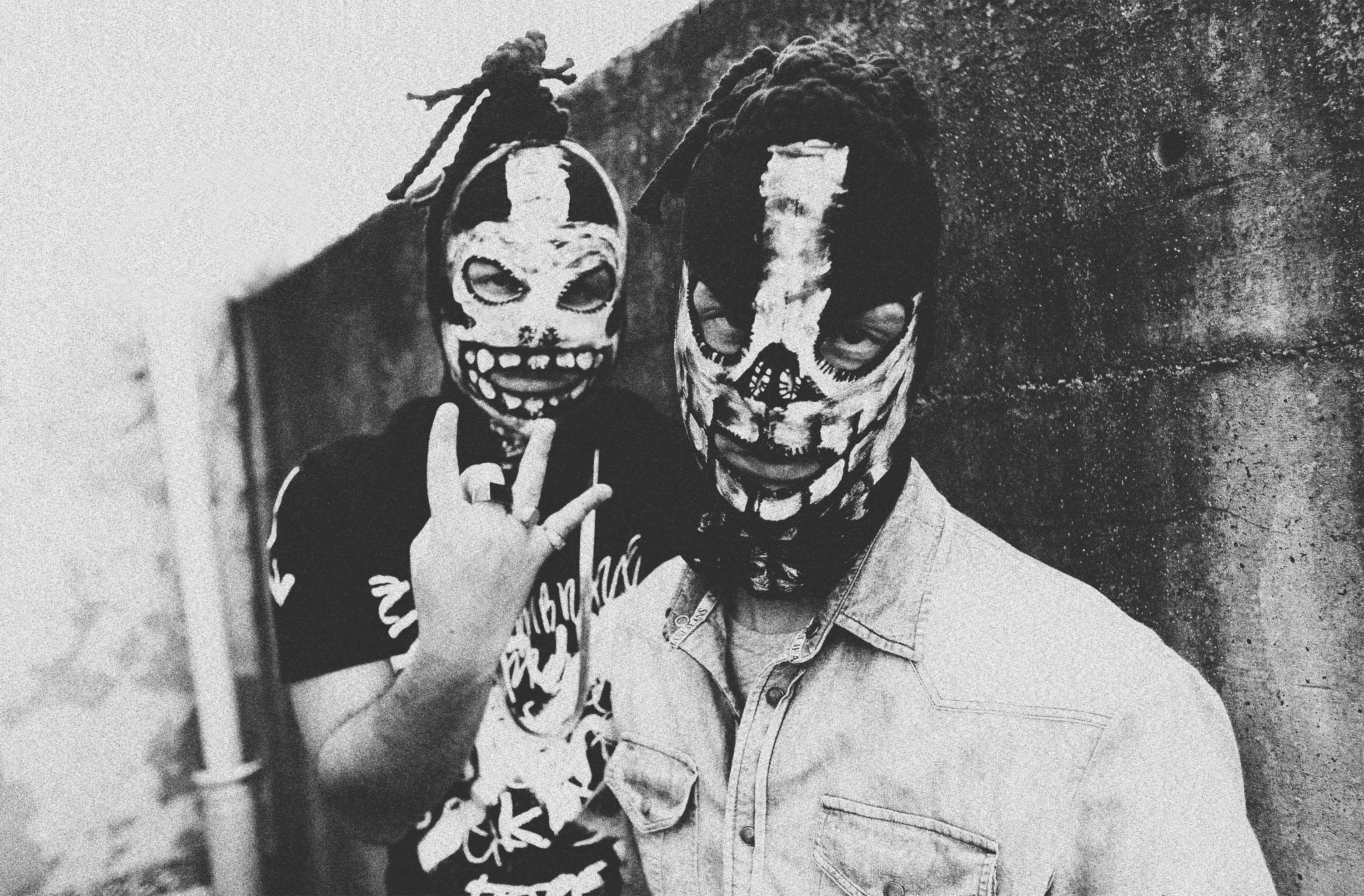
- Genetikk in 2013

Background information
- Origin: Saarbrücken, Germany
- Genres: German hip hop Alternative hip hop
- Years active: 2009–present
- Labels: Outta This World
- Members: Kappa (rapper); Sikk (producer)
- Website: outtathisworld.com

Genetikk is a German hip hop group from Saarbrücken. Members Kappa and Sikk formed the group in 2009 and have since released nine studio albums.

== History ==
Karuzo and Sikk are from Saarbrücken. The duo got to know each other in school and started recording music. In the process, a hip hop group with constantly changing members was formed. The debut album Foetus was recorded in Paris and released for download in October 2010. It was rated by critics as presenting a Realo-Gangster charme and comical exaggeration of the own character. Moreover, the style alludes to the appearance of the hip hop group Insane Clown Posse which represent Juggalos.

Their second album was announced in spring 2011 with music video releases of the singles Inkubation, Genie und Wahnsinn and Konichiwa Bitches. The latter one was later removed. After signing to Düsseldorf-based label Selfmade Records in late 2011, the album Voodoozirkus was released in February 2012. Performing as a supporting act for GZA and French rapper Sefyu in the same month, the rap group's popularity increased and album sales thrived. Genetikk signed a publication contract with BMG and performed with 257ers and DCVDNS for the tour Menschen, Tiere, AKKtraktionen.

On 21 June 2013, the group's third album D.N.A., which stands for Da Neckbreaker Aliens, including the singles D.N.A. and Champions was released and reached the top of the German album charts. The album also includes contributions by rapper RZA and label partner Kollegah.

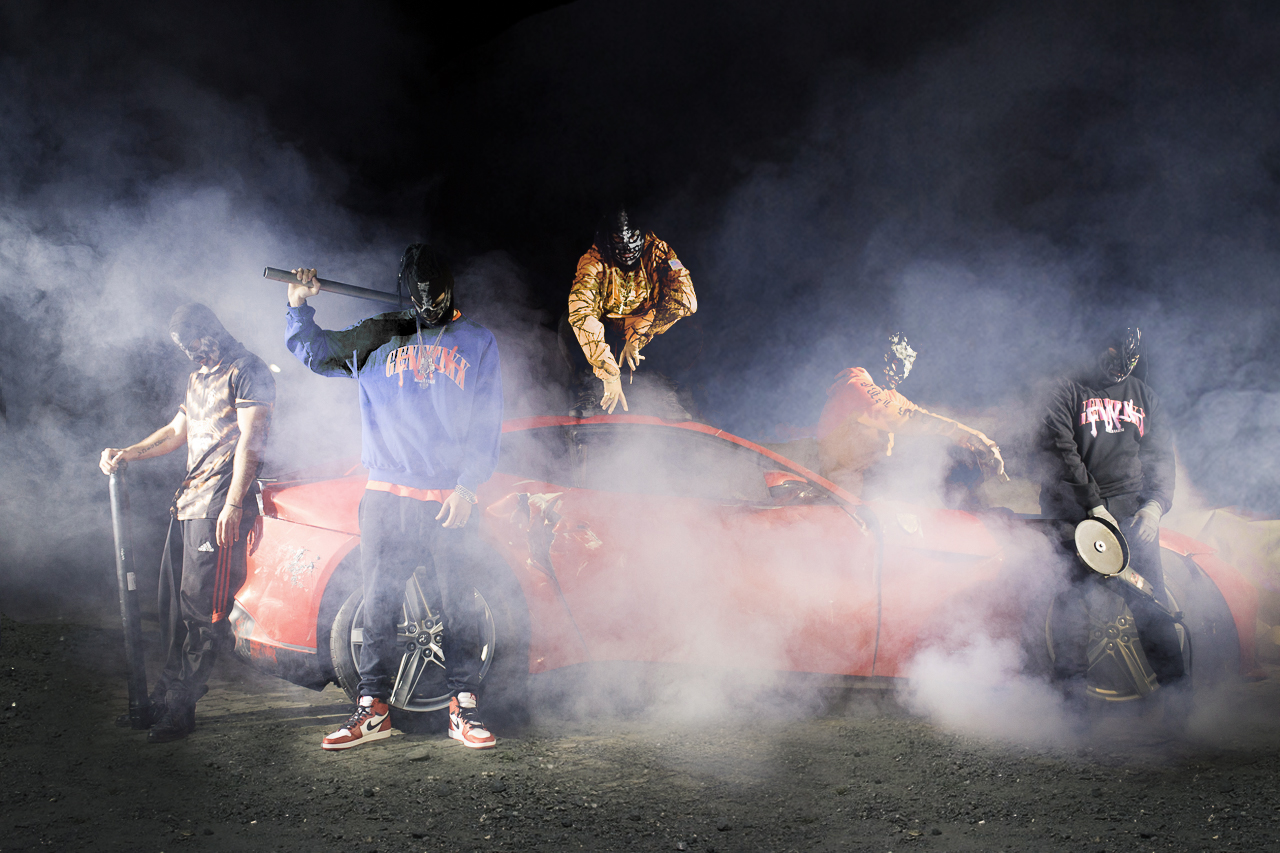
Genetikk in 2016

In March 2015, the track list for their fourth album Achter Tag, was announced. The songs "Achter Tag/Dago", "Wünsch dir was", "Caput Mundis" and "Überüberstyle" were released on YouTube to promote their album. "Achter Tag" was released on 8 May 2015 and reached the top of the German, Austrian and Swiss album charts.

They also collaborated with Kollegah, Favorite, 257ers and Karate Andi on the third Selfmade Records sampler "Chronik III", which was released on 9 October 2015 and reached the top of the German charts as well.

"Wünsch dir was" was featured as a song on the 2015 video game Need for Speed.

A new album was released on 2 December 2016 called "FUKK GENETIKK". Songs include "Jordan Belfort" and others.

== Discography ==
=== Albums ===
==== Studio albums ====
List of studio albums, with chart positions, sales figures and certifications
Title	Album details	Peak chart positions			Sales	Certifications
Title	Album details	GER	AUT	SWI	Sales	Certifications
Foetus	Released: 2010; Label: Selfmade; Formats: CD, digital download	—	—	—	—	—
Voodoozirkus	Released: 24 February 2012; Label: Selfmade; Formats: CD, digital download, vinyl	—	70	—	—	—
D.N.A.	Released: 21 June 2013; Label: Selfmade; Formats: CD, digital download, vinyl, box set	1	4	5	GER: 100,000+	BVMI: Gold
Achter Tag	Released: 8 May 2015; Label: Selfmade; Formats: CD, digital download, vinyl, box set	1	1	1	GER: 100,000+	BVMI: Gold
Fukk Genetikk	Released: 2 December 2016; Label: Selfmade; Formats: CD, digital download, vinyl, box set	6	9	5	—	—
D.N.A. II	Released: 17 August 2018; Label: Outta This World; Formats: CD, digital download, vinyl, bundle (included in Y.A.L.A box set)	22	20	19	—	—
Y.A.L.A	Released: 19 October 2018; Label: Outta This World; Formats: CD, digital download, vinyl, box set	1	6	5	—	—
Outtathisworld – Radio Show Vol. 1	Released: 29 November 2019; Label: Outta This World; Formats: CD, digital download, bundle	11	25	22	—	—
Foetus (10 Years Anniversary Edition)	Released: 28 October 2020; Label: Outta This World; Formats: CD, digital download, bundle	—	—	—	—	—
MDNA	Released: 13 August 2021; Label: Outta This World; Formats: CD, digital download, bundle	1	9	10	—	—
Outtathisworld - Radio Show Vol. 2	Released: 23 September 2022; Label: Outta This World; Formats: CD, digital download, vinyl	—	—	—	—	—

==== Extended plays ====
List of extended plays
Title	EP details
Liebs oder lass es	Released: 12 July 2013; Label: Selfmade; Format: Digital download

=== Singles ===
List of singles as lead artist, with chart positions and certifications, showing year released and album name
Title	Year	Peak chart positions			Album
Title	Year	GER	AUT	SWI	Album
"Inkubation"	2011	—	—	—	Voodoozirkus
"Puls"	2012	—	—	—	Voodoozirkus
"Sorry"	2012	—	—	—	Voodoozirkus
"König der Lügner"	2012	—	—	—	Voodoozirkus
"Genie und Wahnsinn"	2012	—	—	—	Voodoozirkus
"D.N.A."	2013	—	—	—	D.N.A.
"Champions"	2013	—	—	—	D.N.A.
"Über Alles"	2013	—	—	—	D.N.A.
"Yes Sir"	2013	—	—	—	D.N.A.
"Liebs oder lass es" (featuring Sido)	2013	33	—	—	D.N.A.
"Achter Tag / Dago"	2015	—	—	—	Achter Tag
"Wünsch dir was"	2015	37	53	—	Achter Tag
"Caput Mundis"	2015	—	—	—	Achter Tag
"Jungs ausm Barrio" (featuring SSIO)	2015	—	—	—	Achter Tag
"Überüberstyle"	2015	—	—	—	Achter Tag
"Selfmade Allstars" (with Karate Andi, 257ers, Favorite & Kollegah)	2015	—	—	—	Achter Tag
"Überüberstyle"	2015	—	—	—	Achter Tag
"Peng Peng"	2016	—	—	—	Fukk Genetikk
"Jordan Belfort"	2016	—	—	—	Fukk Genetikk
"Tote Präsidenten"	2016	—	—	—	Fukk Genetikk
"Teen Spirit"	2016	—	—	—	Fukk Genetikk
"Lang lebe die Gang" (featuring Lena)	2017	—	—	—	Non album-singles
"Drugs in my Body" (featuring Lena)	2017	—	—	—	Non album-singles
"F.D.S"	2018	—	—	—	D.N.A.2
"MASI MASI"	2018	—	—	—	D.N.A.2
"GOAT" (featuring Yung Gold)	2018	—	—	—	Y.A.L.A
"WAKE UP"	2018	—	—	—	Y.A.L.A
"Bitches"	2018	—	—	—	Y.A.L.A
"CHOP $uEY"	2019	—	—	—	Outtathisworld – Radio Show Vol. 1
"Masters vom Mars"	2019	—	—	—	Outtathisworld – Radio Show Vol. 1
"Nicht fürs Radio"	2019	77	—	—	Outtathisworld – Radio Show Vol. 1
"Requiem"	2021	—	—	—	MDNA
"Antiassimiliert"	2021	—	—	—	MDNA
"German Angst! (Der Traum ist aus)"	2021	—	—	—	MDNA
"Dank God"	2021	—	—	—	MDNA

== Nominations ==
- 2016: Berlin Music Video Awards, Best Director for 'WÜNSCH DIR WAS'
