= Jung Brutal Gutaussehend 3 =

Studio album by Kollegah and Farid Bang
- Released: 1 December 2017
- Recorded: December 2016−19 October 2017 in Düsseldorf, Germany
- Genres: Rap; gangsta rap; hip hop
- Length: 60:20
- Labels: Alpha Music Empire; Banger Musik; BMG
- Producers: Juh-Dee; Joznez; Johnny Illstrument; Gee Futuristic; Abaz; Reflectionz; Nikki 3k; Toxik Tyson; Lea Canere; Freshmaker; C-Wash; Hookbeats; Phil Fanatic

Kollegah chronology
Imperator (2016)	JBG 3 (2017)	§185 (2017)

Farid Bang chronology
Blut (2016)	JBG 3 (2017)	§185 (2017)

Singles from Jung Brutal Gutaussehend 3
- 1. "Sturmmaske auf (Intro)" Released: 28 September 2017; 2. "Gamechanger" Released: 2 November 2017; 3. "Ave Maria" Released: 30 November 2017

Singles from JBG 3 X-Mas Edition
- 1. "Die JBG3 Weihnachtsgeschichte" Released: 22 December 2017

Singles from JBG 3 New Year Edition
- 1. "One Night Stand" Released: 29 December 2017

Jung Brutal Gutaussehend 3 ("Young, violent, handsome 3"; also stylized as Jung, brutal, gutaussehend 3 and abbreviated as JBG 3) is the third collaborative studio album by German rappers Kollegah and Farid Bang. It was released on 1 December 2017 through Alpha Music Empire, Banger Musik, and BMG. Before the release of the album, Kollegah and Bang collaborated on Jung, brutal, gutaussehend in 2009 and Jung, brutal, gutaussehend 2 in 2013.

The album produced three singles, including "Gamechanger", "Ave Maria" and the number one single "Sturmmaske auf (Intro)", all of which received music videos. Kollegah and Farid Bang promoted the album with a limited box set and the JBG3-Tour in January 2018.

Jung Brutal Gutaussehend 3 debuted at number one on the German, Swiss and Austrian album charts. The album was certified platinum by Bundesverband Musikindustrie (BVMI) and gold by IFPI Austria. As of April 2018, the record has sold 207,500 album-equivalent units in German-speaking Europe, with incomes amounting to €4.3 million from physical album sales alone.

Upon its release, the album received negative reviews from critics, with particular attention drawn to the production, misogyny and alleged antisemitism. The album won the Echo Music Prize in the Hip-Hop/Urban national category, which led to the prize being discontinued, following a controversy about antisemitic lyrics on the song "0815" on the bonus EP §185.

== Background and release ==
Kollegah and Farid Bang first worked together on Jung, brutal, gutaussehend (2009). Their second collaborative album Jung, brutal, gutaussehend 2 (2013) became an immediate success and debuted on number one of the German, Austrian and Swiss Albumcharts. The album became their first to be gold-certified by the BVMI. Both ventured back to solo releases between 2014 and 2018 and each released three studio albums. JBG 3 was first confirmed by Farid Bang on the single "Blut" of his seventh album Blut (2016). In August 2016, Farid Bang announced on Facebook that the album would be released in 2017. In September 2017 they confirmed that the album would be released on 1 December.

The album's production began in December 2016 and was completed on 19 October 2017. JBG 3 was released by Alpha Music Empire, Banger Musik and distributed by BMG, Kollegah's and Farid Bang's respective record labels. On 7 September 2017, the limited box set was made available to pre-order on Amazon and other retailers for €49.99.

Internationally the album was released on 1 December 2017, on all major streaming platforms and physically in German-speaking Europe. Kollegah and Farid Bang promoted Jung Brutal Gutaussehend 3 with a 15-date tour through Germany, Austria and Switzerland, which began on 5 January and concluded on 24 January 2018.

== Composition ==
JBG 3 is a gangsta rap, hip hop album; it opens with "Sturmmaske auf (Intro)", which is a battle rap song. The second track "Ave Maria" an "aggressive" song, in which Kollegah and Farid Bang diss rappers from ersguterjunge. Kollegah and Farid Bang use in "Gamechanger", "fast-pace double-time" and diss the KMN-Gang. It is followed by "Rap wieder Rap", produced by Gee Futuristic and a fan favorite, whose lyrics talk about bringing rap music back to the roots.

== Commercial performance ==
The record was certified gold by the Bundesverband Musikindustrie (BVMI) eight days before its initial release, becoming the fastest album to be certified in Germany. The album debuted on number one of the German album charts on 8 December 2017, becoming Kollegahs fifth and Farid Bangs fourth consecutive album to reach the pole position. The album also achieved the biggest first-week sales in hip hop in two years. All 17 tracks of the album reached the top 50 of the singlecharts, with eight reaching the top 20 and three the top 10. The record stayed in the top 10 for five weeks and left the charts after 33 non-consecutive weeks on 17 August 2018. JBG 3 was certified platinum by the BVMI in April 2018, becoming Kollegah's second and Farid Bang's first platinum record. The album debuted at number one on the top 20 hip hop charts and stayed on top for three weeks. It spent 19 weeks in the top 5 and left the charts after 36 consecutive weeks.

JBG 3 received similar success in Austria and Switzerland, where it also debuted on the pole positions. All of the album tracks entered the charts in Austria and two in Switzerland. The album was certified gold by IFPI Austria on 12 December 2017 for shipments of 7,500 copies.

== Singles ==
To support Jung Brutal Gutaussehend 3, five singles were released. The first of which, "Sturmmaske auf (Intro)", was released on 28 September 2017, and became an immediate success for the two rappers. The single became their first song to debuted on number one of the German single charts, six in Austria and 15 in Switzerland. Both "Gamechanger" and "Ave Maria" reached the top 10 in Germany, top 20 in Austria and top 25 in Switzerland. On 22 December 2017, "Die JBG3 Weihnachtsgeschichte", was released, but did not enter the charts. "One Night Stand", released on 29 December 2017, peaked at number 51 on the German singles chart.

== Critical reception ==
=== Music critics ===
Professional ratings
Review scores
Source	Rating
Rappers.in	2.5/6 stars
laut.de	3/5 stars
Noisey	negative
MZEE	moderate
Juice	negative
Splash!	negative

Music critics gave moderate to negative reviews of Jung Brutal Gutaussehend 3 upon its release. Max Brandl from laut.de gave the album three out of five stars. He criticized the songs "Frontload", "Massephase" and "Warlordz" for their "bumpy Kindergarten production". He also said that JBG 3 is "olympic powerlifting with insults". Rappers.in gave the album 2.5 stars and said that the album "sounded like trash", with "superficial disses". Noisey's Juri Sternburg accuses them of "bad racism" under the cover of "artistic freedom". He also said that "JBG 3 is shallow and silly". Tristan Heming described the lyrics of the album as disgusting: "Rape, racism, Hitler and Stalin name-dropping and Holocaust references. All of this is actually so disgusting in its mass that one could puke."

=== Echo controversy ===
As the Echo Music Prize is determined by the previous year's sales, Jung Brutal Gutaussehend 3 was nominated in the categories best hip hop/urban album and album of the year. German tabloid paper Bild accused Farid Bang and Kollegah of antisemitic lyrics on their song "0815", which was included on the bonus EP §185. They referred to their muscles being more defined than those of Auschwitz inmates.

Campino, singer of the German rock band Die Toten Hosen, was the first to criticize the committee's decision during the ceremony. His remarks received a standing ovation from the audience. Several artists later returned their Echo awards in protest, such as Marius Müller-Westernhagen, who returned all of his seven Echo awards received over the years. Other artists returning their awards were German conductors Christian Thielemann and Enoch zu Guttenberg, Russian-German pianist Igor Levit, record producer Klaus Voormann and the Notos Quartett.

However, criticism did not only come from artists and the German press. Several businesses joined in, with Tom Enders, CEO of Airbus, being one of the most recent high-profile commentators, saying that this would hurt "Germany's international reputation". He also asked if "antisemitism [was] becoming acceptable in Germany" again. As a consequence the Echo award was discontinued after the controversy.

Kollegah and Farid Bang were sued for Volksverhetzung (incitement to hatred) on 24 April 2018. On 16 June 2018 the investigation was suspended by the state's attorney in Düsseldorf. Kollegah apologized for the lyrics, following a visit to Auschwitz II–Birkenau in June 2018. In an interview with German newspaper Stern, Kollegah said "when you see for yourself how people were systematically killed, you'll never forget that. You become more careful and respectful." The continued with, "the Holocaust doesn't fit into hip hop."

=== Indexing ===
The record was put on the index by the Federal Department for Media Harmful to Young Persons in Germany. The songs "Gamechanger", "Wenn der Gegner am Boden liegt" on JBG 3 and "0815" and "Ghettosuperstars 2" on the §185 EP became part of the decisive decision. The songs have a "discriminatory effect against woman". JBG and JBG 2 have been indexed in 2012 and 2014.

== Track listing ==
All lyrics are written by Kollegah and Farid Bang

Jung Brutal Gutaussehend 3
No.	Title	Music	Length
1.	"Sturmmaske auf (Intro)" ("Storm mask on")	Joznez; Johnny Illstrument	3:52
2.	"Ave Maria" ("Hail Mary")	Juh-Dee; Phil Fanatic; Hookbeats	3:22
3.	"Gamechanger"	Mesh; Gee Futuristic; Nikki 3k	3:30
4.	"Rap wieder Rap" ("Rap repeats rap")	Gee Futuristic	3:50
5.	"Studiogangster"	Juh-Dee; Gee Futuristic; Nikki 3k	3:03
6.	"Wenn der Gegner am Boden liegt" ("When the opponent is on the ground")	Freshmaker; Lea Canere	3:06
7.	"Es wird Zeit" ("It's time")	C-Wash	4:30
8.	"Düsseldorfer" ("Düsseldorf")	Juh-Dee	3:48
9.	"Jagdsaison" ("Hunting season")	Joznez; Johnny Illstrument; Toxik Tyson; Reflectionz	2:46
10.	"Jung Brutal Gutaussehend 2017" ("Young Brutal Handsome 2017")	Joznez; Johnny Illstrument; Juh-Dee	3:58
11.	"Frontload"	Juh-Dee	3:23
12.	"Warlordz"	Abaz; Clay Beatz; Juh-Dee	3:06
13.	"Die letzte Gangsterrapcrew" ("The last gangster rap crew")	Joznez; Johnny Illstrument; Toxik Tyson	3:26
14.	"Massephase" ("Mass phase")	Juh-Dee	3:01
15.	"Eines Tages" ("Someday")	Joznez; Johnny Illstrument	3:16
16.	"In jeder deutschen Großstadt" ("In every major German city")	Juh-Dee	4:03
17.	"Älter brutaler skrupelloser (Outro)" ("Older brutal unscrupulous")	Juh-Dee; Gee Futuristic; Nikki 3k	4:20
Total length:			60:20

Jung Brutal Gutaussehend 3 X-Mas Edition
No.	Title	Length
18.	"Die JBG3 Weihnachtsgeschichte" ("The JBG3 Christmas story")	4:09
Total length:		64:40

Jung Brutal Gutaussehend 3 New Year Edition
No.	Title	Length
19.	"One Night Stand"	2:45
Total length:		67:14

Jung Brutal Gutaussehend 3 XXX
No.	Title	Music	Length
1.	"Sturmmaske auf (Intro)"	Joznez; Johnny Illstrument	3:52
2.	"Ave Maria"	Juh-Dee; Phil Fanatic; Hookbeats	3:22
3.	"Rap wieder Rap"	Gee Futuristic	3:50
4.	"Studiogangster"	Juh-Dee; Gee Futuristic; Nikki 3k	3:03
5.	"Es wird Zeit"	C-Wash	4:30
6.	"Düsseldorfer"	Juh-Dee	3:48
7.	"Jagdsaison"	Joznez; Johnny Illstrument; Toxik Tyson; Reflectionz	2:46
8.	"Jung Brutal Gutaussehend 2017"	Joznez; Johnny Illstrument; Juh-Dee	3:58
9.	"Frontload"	Juh-Dee	3:23
10.	"Warlordz"	Abaz; Clay Beatz; Juh-Dee	3:06
11.	"Die letzte Gangsterrapcrew"	Joznez; Johnny Illstrument; Toxik Tyson	3:26
12.	"Massephase"	Juh-Dee	3:01
13.	"Eines Tages"	Joznez; Johnny Illstrument	3:16
14.	"In jeder deutschen Großstadt"	Juh-Dee	4:03
15.	"Älter brutaler skrupelloser (Outro)"	Juh-Dee; Gee Futuristic; Nikki 3k	4:20
16.	"Drecksjob" ("Dirty job")	B-Case; HNDRC	3:22
17.	"Minotaurusnacken" ("Minotaur neck")	Abaz; Clay Beatz	2:55
18.	"Ja ich will" ("Yes, I will")	Juh-Dee	2:46
Total length:			62:45

== Personnel ==
Credits for Jung Brutal Gutaussehend 3 adapted from the booklet.

Technical

- Abaz – engineering (track 12)
- Clay Beatz – engineering (track 12)
- C-Wash – engineering (track 7)
- Farid Bang – primary artist, writer
- Freshmaker – engineering (track 6)
- Gee Futuristic – engineering (tracks 3–5, 17)
- Hookbeats – engineering (track 2)
- Johnny Illstrument – engineering (track 1, 9, 10, 13, 15)
- Reflectionz – engineering (track 9)
- Joznez – engineering (tracks 1, 9, 10, 13, 15)
- Juh-Dee – engineering (tracks 2, 5, 10, 11, 14, 16, 17)
- Kollegah – primary artist, writer
- Lea Canere – engineering (track 6)
- Mesh – engineering (track 3)
- Nikki 3k – engineering (tracks 3, 5, 17)
- Phil Fanatic – engineering (track 2)
- Toxik Tyson – engineering (tracks 9, 13)

Design

- Denis Ignatov – photography
- Justus Ullrich – photography assistant
- Daniel Lanzrath – photography assistant
- Jong-Ho Bark – editing
- Adopekid – typography

== Awards and nominations ==
Year	Prize	Award	Result	Ref.
2017	Hiphop.de Awards	Bestes Album National	Nominated	
2018	Echo Music Prize	Album of the year	Nominated	
2018	Echo Music Prize	Hip-Hop/Urban	Won	

== Charts ==
=== Weekly charts ===
Chart (2017)	Peak position
Austrian Albums (Ö3 Austria)	1
German Albums (Offizielle Top 100)	1
German Albums (Top 20 Hip Hop)	1
Swiss Albums (Schweizer Hitparade)	1

=== Year-end charts ===
Chart (2017)	Position
Austrian Albums (Ö3 Austria)	16
German Albums (Offizielle Top 100)	4

Chart (2018)	Position
German Albums (Offizielle Top 100)	41

== Certifications ==
Region	Certification	Certified units/sales
Austria (IFPI Austria)	Gold	7,500^{‡}
Germany (BVMI)	Platinum	200,000^{‡}
^{‡} Sales+streaming figures based on certification alone.

== Release history ==
Edition	Date	Region	Format	Labels	Ref.
JBG 3	1 December 2017	Worldwide	Digital download; streaming	Alpha Music Empire; Banger Musik; BMG	
JBG 3	1 December 2017	Germany; Austria; Switzerland	CD; Steelbox	Alpha Music Empire; Banger Musik; BMG	
JBG 3 X-Mas Edition	22 December 2017	Worldwide	Digital download; streaming	Alpha Music Empire; Banger Musik; BMG	
JBG 3 New Year Edition	29 December 2017	Worldwide	Digital download; streaming	Alpha Music Empire; Banger Musik; BMG	
JBG XXX	28 September 2018	Worldwide	Digital download; streaming	Alpha Music Empire; Banger Musik; Groove Attack	
