= Farid Bang =

German rapper

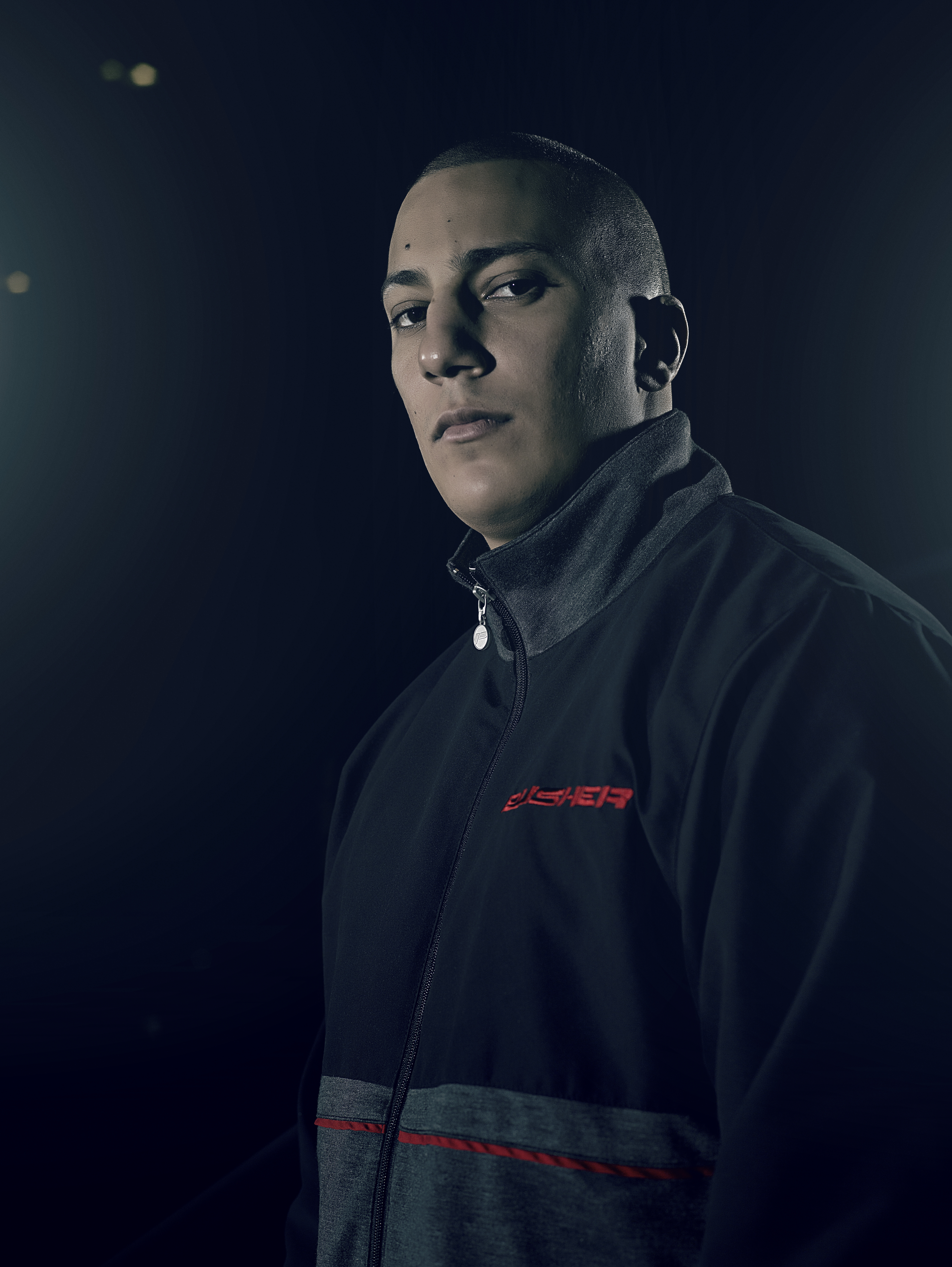
- Bang in 2012

Background information
- Born: Farid Hamed El Abdellaoui; 4 June 1986 (age 40)
- Origin: Melilla, Spain
- Genres: German hip hop; gangsta rap; hardcore rap
- Occupation: Rapper
- Label: Banger Musik

Farid Hamed El Abdellaoui (born 4 June 1986), better known as Farid Bang, is a German gangsta rapper of Moroccan descent. He’s from a part of Spain that’s on the North African coast, bordering Morocco. His parents are Moroccan. At the age of eight, he immigrated from Spain to Germany. Growing up, he idolised the American gangsta rapper 50 Cent, who inspired him to start rapping and working out. Farid Bang addresses the controversy that gangsta rap has a negative influence on youth, arguing that it generally has a positive impact on young men by helping them grow into mature men. He claims that the individuals who are negatively influenced by it often suffer from poor mental health, which causes them to misinterpret the message.

== Early life ==
Farid Bang was born in Melilla, Spain, and grew up in Málaga. At the age of eight, he moved to Düsseldorf, Germany with his mother and sister. His mother grew up in Germany and is of Moroccan descent, while his father is from Melilla, Spain. Bang has mentioned in songs that he is of Riffian-Berber origin. Inspired by his friend Tekken, Bang started rapping at the age of 19 and, with the help of his friend Summer Cem, soon met Eko Fresh, who had already achieved a certain level of fame in Germany. He signed with Fresh's label German Dream and was featured in three songs in his 2005 mixtape Fick immer noch deine Story ("Fuck your story still"), which was Eko's diss against his former mentor and friend, German-based rapper Kool Savas. At this time, Bang was still using the pseudonym Farid Urlaub (parodying German singer Farin Urlaub).

== Career ==
=== 2009–2010: Jung, brutal, gutaussehend and Asphalt Massaka 2 ===
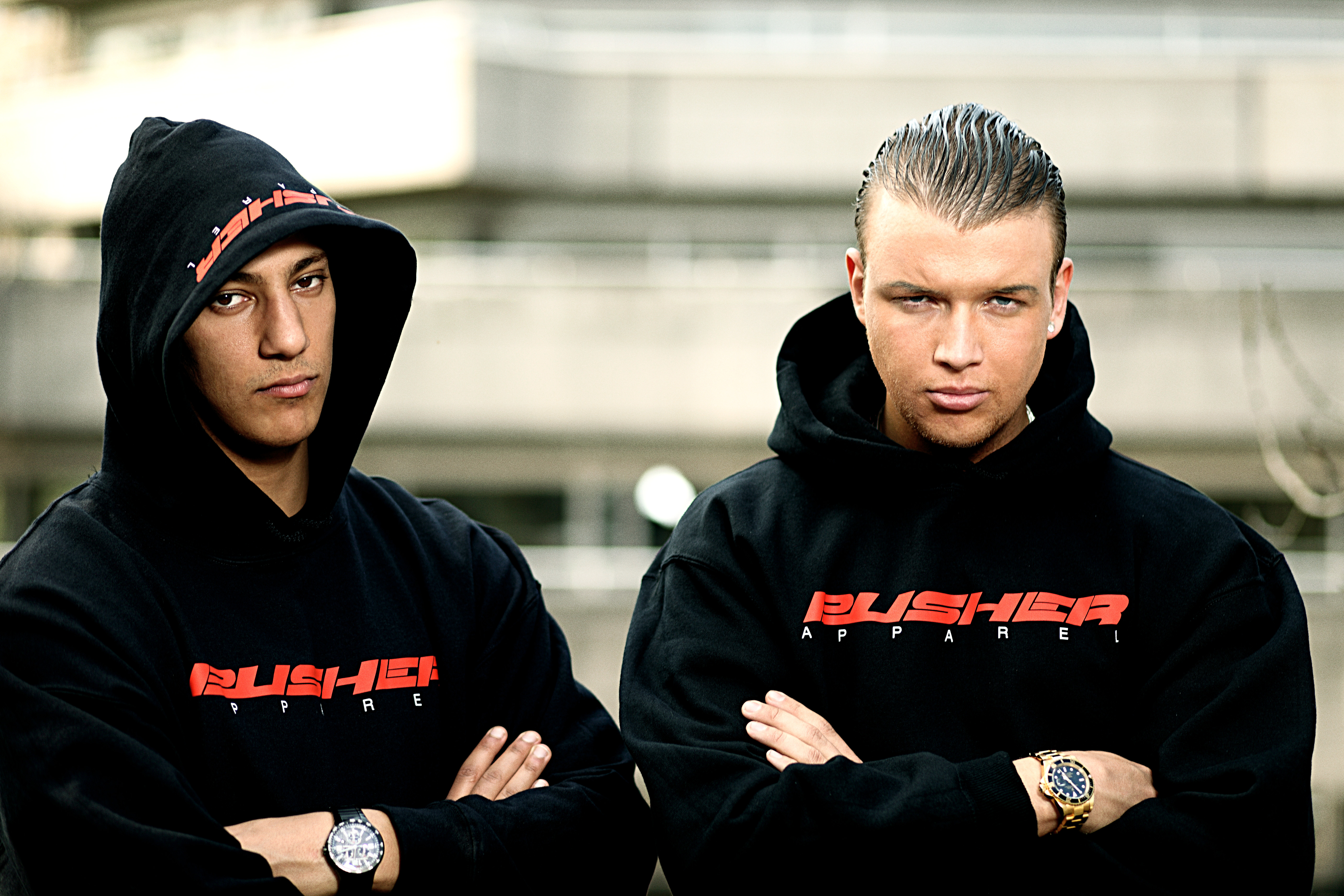
Farid Bang (left) with fellow rapper and longtime collaborator Kollegah in 2009

In March 2009, Bang was featured in the song "Westdeutschlands Kings" ("West Germany's kings"), released on Chronik 2, a collaboration album by the Düsseldorf-based hip hop label Selfmade Records. The song also features Kollegah and Favorite, and was released online for free before the album's release.

In July 2009, he collaborated with Kollegah and Selfmade Records to release Jung, brutal, gutaussehend ("young, brutal, handsome"). The album reached #30 in the German charts. Its only single, "Mitternacht" ("midnight"), features a music video shot in Belgrade, Serbia. Two tracks of the album, "Wir ficken die Szene" ("we fuck the game") and "Ghettosuperstars" were released prior to the album's release on 19 May 2009 and in June 2009, respectively. In addition, a snippet of the album was released.

On 12 March 2010, Bang released his second studio album entitled Asphalt Massaka 2, which ranked #56 in the German album charts. The song "Wer will Beef" ("who wants beef") as well as an album snippet were released for free on 5 February 2010 on Bang's official homepage. The first single, "Teufelskreis" ("vicious circle"), released on 11 February 2010, includes a download code for the track "König der Nacht" ("king of the night"). Videos of both tracks were released on 11 January 2010 and 9 February 2010, respectively. "Teufelskreis" was not able to enter the charts. The music video for "Es ist soweit" ("it's time") was released on 25 February 2010. It features appearances of Bang's mentor Eko Fresh and German footballer Kevin Kurányi. On 10 March, the video for the song "Gangsta Musik" was released, featuring Bass Sultan Hengzt. The release party took place on 12 March 2010 in the club Noir in Düsseldorf, where the guest artists from the album were present.

=== 2010–2012: Banger leben kürzer and Der letzte Tag deines Lebens ===
On 18 February 2011, Bang released his third studio album, Banger leben kürzer, which peaked at number 11 in the German albums chart, number 25 in Switzerland and number 32 in Austria. These ratings were the highest Bang and his label German Dream had ever achieved. Before the album's release, he had released a ten-part videoblog on YouTube, which promoted his upcoming album. As of December 2014, the album has sold over 10,000 copies.

=== 2013–present: Killa, Asphalt Massaka 3 and Blut ===
In 2013, Bang released the lead single from Killa titled "Bitte Spitte Toi Lab". It was his first and as of 2016 his only solo single to reach the German and Austrian Top 40. The album, released on 14 February 2014, reached number 1 in Germany and Austria. His following album, Asphalt Massaka 3, was released on 27 March 2015 and debuted at number 1 in Germany and Switzerland, as well as number 3 in Austria. His seventh akimbo album, Blut, was released on 27 May 2016.

In 2018, Kollegah and Farid Bang were criticized for alleged antisemitic lyrics on their album Jung, brutal, gutaussehend 3, which won the Echo Award for the highest-selling album of 2017.

== Discography ==
Studio albums

- Asphalt Massaka (2008)
- Asphalt Massaka 2 (2010)
- Banger leben kürzer (2011)
- Der letzte Tag deines Lebens (2012)
- Killa (2014)
- Asphalt Massaka 3 (2015)
- Blut (2016)
- Jung, brutal, gutaussehend 3 (2017) feat. Kollegah
- Genkidama (2020)
- Asozialer Marokkaner (2021)
- X (2021)
- Asphalt Massaka 4 (2023)
- XII (2024)
