= RAF Camora discography =

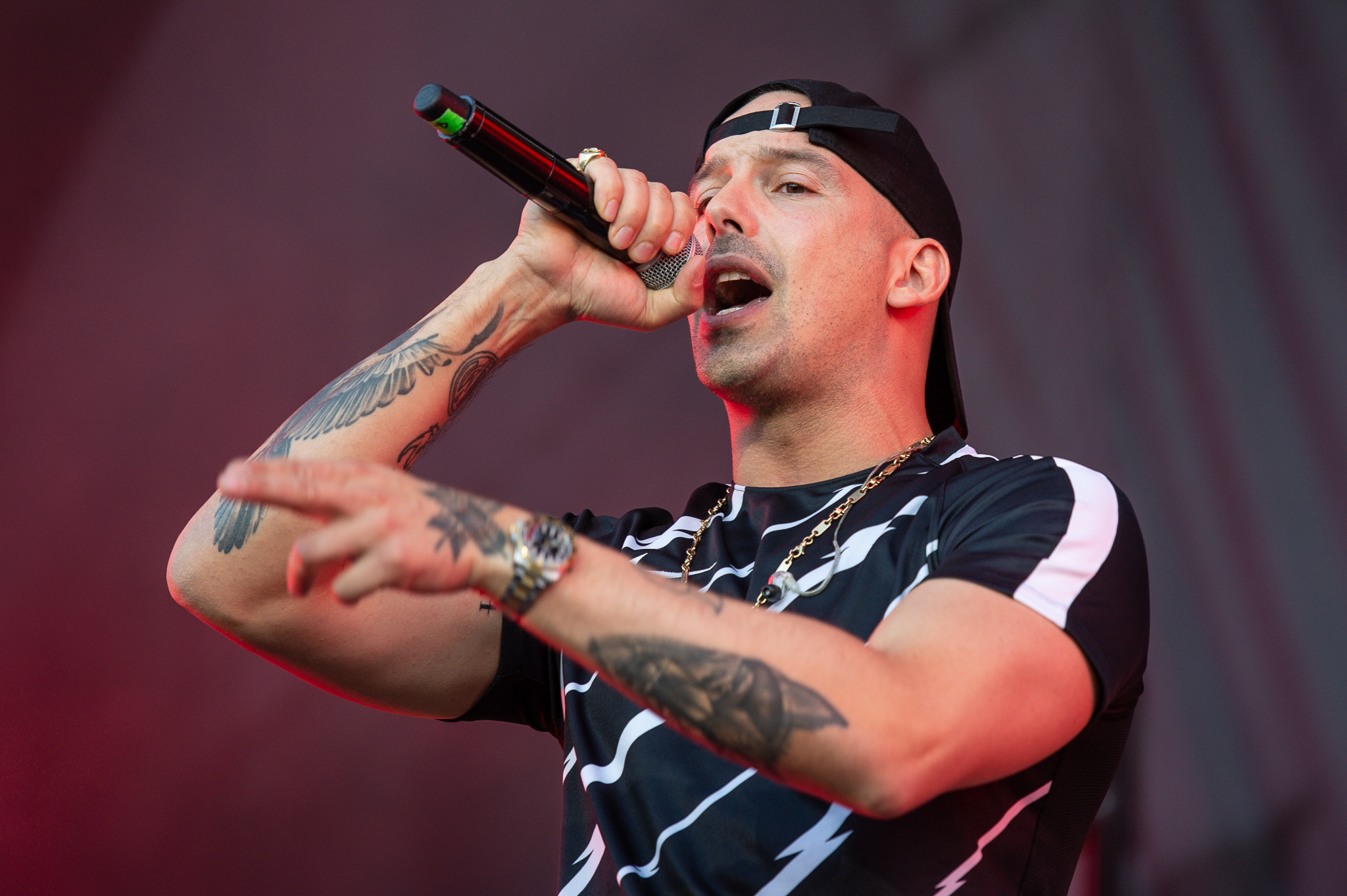
- RAF Camora during "Rock im Park" in Nuremberg, Bavaria, Germany (June 2018)
- Studio albums: 8
- EPs: 6
- Singles: 59
- Music videos: 60
- Mixtapes: 6
- Collaborative albums: 5

Austrian rapper and dancehall musician RAF Camora has released eight studio albums, six extended plays, six mixtapes, five collaborative albums and fifty-nine singles (including fifteen as a featured artist). RAF Camora was awarded for sales of 8.4 million records in Austria, Germany and Switzerland.

RAF Camora's career started in 2003 with the release of Assaut Mystik & Balkan Express as part of Family Bizz. His first records as a solo artist, Therapie vor dem Album (2008) and Nächster Stopp Zukunft (2009), couldn't enter the charts. His first chart successes were with Artkore (2010), alongside Austrian rapper Nazar and Therapie nach dem Album (2010), both reaching the top fifty in Austria. RAF Camora's following releases, RAF 3.0 (2012), Hoch 2 (2013) and Zodiak (2014), with Chakuza and Joshi Mizu and Ghøst (2016), peaked in the top ten of Austria and Germany.

His fourth collaborative album Palmen aus Plastik with Bonez MC (2016) debuted at number one in German-speaking Europe and is certified gold by IFPI Austria and platinum by the Bundesverband Musikindustrie (BVMI). The album spawned four singles; "Palmen aus Plastik," "Ruhe nach dem Sturm," "Mörder," and "Ohne mein Team". All are at least certified gold by the BVMI, while "Ohne mein Team" is certified diamond.

Spotify crowned RAF Camora as the most streamed German-language artist in 2017 and 2018, respectively.

== Albums ==
=== Studio albums ===
List of studio albums, with chart positions and certifications
Title	Album details	Peak chart positions				Certifications
Title	Album details	AUT	GER		SWI	Certifications
Title	Album details	AUT	Top 100	Hip hop	SWI	Certifications
Nächster Stopp Zukunft	Released: 13 November 2009; Label: Wolfpack Entertainment; Formats: CD, digital download, streaming	—	—	—N/a	—	none
RAF 3.0	Released: 24 February 2012; Label: Irievibrations Records; Formats: CD, digital download, streaming	5	7	—N/a	22	none
Hoch 2	Released: 5 July 2013; Label: Indipendenza; Formats: CD, digital download, streaming	3	1	—N/a	8	none
Ghøst	Released: 15 April 2016; Label: Indipendenza; Formats: CD, digital download, streaming	6	3	1	13	none
Anthrazit	Released: 25 August 2017; Label: Indipendenza; Formats: CD, digital download, streaming	1	1	1	5	IFPI AUT: Gold; BVMI: Platinum
Anthrazit RR	Re-released: 15 December 2017; Label: Indipendenza; Formats: streaming	1	1	1	5	IFPI AUT: Gold; BVMI: Platinum
Zenit	Released: 1 November 2019; Label: Indipendenza; Formats: CD, digital download, streaming	1	1	1	1	IFPI AUT: Platinum; BVMI: Gold
Zukunft	Released: 9 July 2021; Label: Indipendenza; Formats: CD, digital download, streaming	1	1	1	1	
Zukunft II	Released: 1 October 2021; Label: Indipendenza; Formats: CD, digital download, streaming	—	1	—	88	
XV	Released: 23 June 2023; Label: 187 Strassenbande; Formats: CD, digital download, streaming	1	1	—	1	
"—" denotes releases that did not chart or were not released in that region. "N/A": The Hiphop–Charts were introduced on 1 April 2015.

==== Collaborative albums ====
List of collaborative studio albums, with chart positions and certifications
Title	Album details	Peak chart positions				Certifications
Title	Album details	AUT	GER		SWI	Certifications
Title	Album details	AUT	Top 100	Hip hop	SWI	Certifications
Assaut Mystik & Balkan Express (with Family Bizz)	Released: 2003; Label: Self–released; Formats: CD	—	—	—N/a	—	none
Artkore (with Nazar)	Released: 12 March 2010; Label: Wolfpack Entertainment; Formats: CD, digital download, streaming	33	—	—N/a	—	none
Zodiak (with Chakuza and Joshi Mizu)	Released: 14 March 2014; Label: Indipendenza; Formats: CD, digital download, streaming	4	4	—N/a	13	none
Palmen aus Plastik (with Bonez MC)	Released: 9 September 2016; Label: Auf!Keinen!Fall!, Indipendenza; Formats: CD, digital download, streaming	1	1	1	1	IFPI AUT: Platinum; BVMI: Platinum
Tannen aus Plastik (with Bonez MC)	Re-released: 16 December 2016; Label: Auf!Keinen!Fall!, Indipendenza; Formats: CD, digital download, streaming	1	1	1	1	IFPI AUT: Platinum; BVMI: Platinum
Palmen aus Plastik 2 (with Bonez MC)	Released: 5 October 2018; Label: Vertigo, Capitol, Universal; Formats: CD, digital download, streaming	1	1	1	1	IFPI AUT: Gold; BVMI: Gold
Palmen aus Plastik 3 (with Bonez MC)	Released: 9 September 2022; Label: 187 Strassenbande; Formats: CD, digital download, streaming	1	1	—	2	
"—" denotes releases that did not chart or were not released in that region. "N/A": The Hiphop–Charts were introduced on 1 April 2015.

=== Mixtapes ===
List of mixtapes with chart positions
Title	Album details	Peaks
Title	Album details	AUT
Therapie vor dem Album	Released: 18 July 2008; Label: Wolfpack Entertainment; Formats: CD, digital download, streaming audio	—
Therapie nach dem Album	Released: 24 September 2010; Label: Wolfpack Entertainment; Formats: CD, digital download, streaming audio	42
Inedit 2003–2010	Released: 24 December 2010; Label: Wolfpack Entertainment; Formats: CD, digital download, streaming audio	—
Therapie nach dem Tod	Released: 31 August 2012 (Note: The cd of Therapie nach dem Tod was exclusively distributed through German music store MZEE.); Label: Indipendenza; Formats: CD, digital download, streaming audio	40
INEDIT–TNDT	Released: 9 September 2012; Label: Indipendenza; Formats: Free download	—
Opera Camora	Released: 23 May 2016; Label: Indipendenza	—
"—" denotes releases that did not chart or were not released in that region.

=== Extended plays ===
List of extended plays with chart positions
Title	Album details	Peak chart positions			
Title	Album details	AUT	GER		SWI
Title	Album details	AUT	Top 100	Hip hop	SWI
Skandal (with Emirez)	Released: 2006; Label: Self released; Formats: free download	—	—	—N/a	—
Die schwarze EP	Released: 19 December 2014; Label: Indipendenza; Formats: CD, digital download	—	—	—N/a	
Schwarze Materie	Released: 15 April 2016 (Note: Schwarze Materie was exclusively distributed through the box set of Ghøst.); Label: Indipendenza; Formats: CD	—	—	—N/a	—
Die weisse EP	Released: 26 June 2015; Label: Indipendenza; Formats: CD, digital download	—	—	—	—
Schwarze Materie II	Released: 25 August 2017 (Note: Schwarze Materie II was exclusively distributed through the box set of Anthrazit.); Label: Indipendenza; Formats: CD	—	—	—	—
Vulcano EP (with Bonez MC)	Released: 5 October 2018; Label: Vertigo, Capitol, Universal; Formats: CD, digital download	15	41	7	47
"—" denotes releases that did not chart or were not released in that region. "N/A": The Hiphop–Charts were introduced on 1 April 2015.

== Singles ==
=== As lead artist ===
Title	Year	Peak chart positions			Certifications	Album
Title	Year	AUT	GER	SWI	Certifications	Album
"Winner"	2009	—	—	—		Nächster Stopp Zukunft
"Killabizzz" (with Nazar)	2010	—	—	—		Artkore
"Artkore" (with Nazar)	2010	—	—	—		Artkore
"Fallen" (featuring Nazar)	2012	57	96	—		RAF 3.0
"Wie kannst du nur"	2012	73	91	—		RAF 3.0
"Tumor"	2012	—	—	—		RAF 3.0
"Träumer"	2013	—	—	—		Hoch 2
"Schwarze Sonne" (featuring Vega & Prinz Pi)	2013	—	—	—		Hoch 2
"Klepto" (with Chakuza & Joshi Mizu)	2014	—	—	—		Zodiak
"T.R.I.P. 2" (featuring Joshi Mizu)	2014	—	—	—		Non-album single
"Ghøst"	2016	—	—	—		Ghøst
"Noah"	2016	—	—	—		Ghøst
"Dämonen"	2016	—	—	—		Ghøst
"TNDZ"	2016	—	—	—		Schwarze Materie
"Geschichte" (featuring Bonez MC)	2016	—	—	—		Ghøst
"So lala"	2016	—	—	—		Ghøst
"Palmen aus Plastik" (with Bonez MC)	2016	51	10	66	BVMI: 2× Platinum	Palmen aus Plastik
"Ruhe nach dem Sturm" (with Bonez MC)	2016	—	42	—	BVMI: Gold	Palmen aus Plastik
"Mörder" (with Bonez MC featuring Gzuz)	2016	67	20	—	BVMI: Platinum	Palmen aus Plastik
"Ohne mein Team" (with Bonez MC featuring Maxwell)	2016	34	7	58	BVMI: Diamond; IFPI AUT: Gold	Palmen aus Plastik
"Palmen aus Gold" (with Bonez MC)	2016	35	7	35	BVMI: Gold	Tannen aus Plastik
"An ihnen vorbei" (with Bonez MC)	2016	48	8	34	BVMI: Platinum	Tannen aus Plastik
"Kontrollieren" (featuring Bonez MC, Gzuz & Maxwell)	2017	51	11	66	IFPI AUT: Gold; BVMI: Platinum; IFPI SWI: Gold	Anthrazit
"Alles probiert" (featuring Bonez MC)	2017	33	37	88	IFPI AUT: Gold; BVMI: Gold	Anthrazit
"Bye, Bye"	2017	53	52	—		Anthrazit
"Andere Liga"	2017	16	20	40	IFPI AUT: Gold; BVMI: Gold; IFPI SWI: Gold	Anthrazit
"Primo"	2017	8	6	16	IFPI AUT: Platinum; BVMI: Platinum; IFPI SWI: Platinum	Anthrazit
"Verkauft" (featuring Bausa)	2017	70	64	—		Anthrazit RR
"Sag Nix"	2017	3	6	14	IFPI AUT: Gold; BVMI: Gold	Anthrazit RR
"Gotham City"	2017	11	9	21	IFPI AUT: Gold; BVMI: Gold	Anthrazit RR
"Corleone"	2018	6	13	17	IFPI AUT: Gold	Non-album singles
"Maserati"	2018	1	11	27		Non-album singles
"500 PS" (with Bonez MC)	2018	2	1	4	IFPI AUT: Platinum; BVMI: Diamond	Palmen aus Plastik 2
"Risiko" (with Bonez MC)	2018	2	2	2	IFPI AUT: Gold	Palmen aus Plastik 2
"Kokain" (with Bonez MC featuring Gzuz)	2018	1	1	3	IFPI AUT: Gold; BVMI: Platinum	Palmen aus Plastik 2
"In meiner Zone 2.0"	2018	6	19	25		Non-album single
"Perfekt" (with AriBeatz & Sofiane)	2018	1	5	7	BVMI: Gold	Press Play
"Hermès" (with Gallo Nero)	2019	12	37	51		471
"Neptun" (with KC Rebell)	2019	1	2	6		Non-album single
"Vendetta"	2019	1	3	7	IFPI AUT: Gold	Zenit
"Barcelona" (with Gringo)	2019	11	21	35		Gringoland
"Adriana"	2019	3	7	5	IFPI AUT: Gold; BVMI: Gold	Zenit
"Puta Madre" (featuring Ghetto Phénomène)	2019	2	5	4	IFPI AUT: Platinum; BVMI: Gold	Zenit
"Sag ihnen 2"	2019	74	33	—		Zenit
"100%" (with Senidah)	2019	3	28	6		Non-album single
"Maschine" (with The Cratez)	2020	1	9	14		Nonstop
"Blaues Licht" (with Bonez MC)	2021	1	1	2		Zukunft II
"2CB" (featuring Luciano)	2021	1	1	2		Non-album singles
"Criminal" (with Jala Brat and Buba Corelli)	2022	1	36	18		Non-album singles
"All Night" (featuring Luciano)	2023	1	1	1		XV
"Anna"	2023	1	8	3		XV
"Bei Nacht" (featuring Cro)	2023	1	6	10		XV
"Strada" (featuring Ahmad Amin)	2023	1	3	7		XV
"Liebe Grüße" (with Ski Aggu)	2023	1	1	2		Non-album single
"Ocean" (with Ufo361)	2025	—	—	—		Non-album single

=== As featured artist ===
Title	Year	Peak chart positions			Certifications	Album
Title	Year	AUT	GER	SWI	Certifications	Album
"Die letzten ihrer Art (Mammut Remix)" (Silla featuring RAF Camora, MoTrip, Joka, Credebil & Amar)	2015	—	—	—		Es war einmal in Südberlin
"Villa" (Metrickz featuring RAF Camora)	2016	—	—	—		Raw
"Stress mit mir" (Maxwell featuring RAF Camora)	2017	—	—	—		Safari
"Plem Plem" (Kontra K featuring RAF Camora & Bonez MC)	2017	—	46	—		Gute Nacht
"Olé Olé" (Capital Bra featuring RAF Camora & Joshi Mizu)	2017	70	36	—	BVMI: Gold	Blyat
"GottSeiDank" (Trettmann featuring Bonez MC & RAF Camora)	2017	56	31	—	BVMI: Gold	#DIY
"Qa Bone" (Azet featuring RAF Camora)	2017	17	12	30	BVMI: Gold; IFPI AUT: Gold; IFPI SWI: Gold	Fast Life
"Nema bolje" (Jala Brat & Buba Corelli featuring RAF Camora)	2017	40	—	—		Alfa & Omega
"Erfolg" (Joshi Mizu featuring RAF Camora)	2018	—	—	—		Non-album single
"Fame" (Kontra K featuring RAF Camora)	2018	4	6	29	BVMI: Gold	Erde & Knochen
"Toto" (Noizy featuring RAF Camora)	2018	2	18	4	IFPI AUT: Gold; IFPI SWI: Gold	Non-album single
"Paradies" (Ufo361 featuring RAF Camora)	2018	12	16	31		VVS
"Molotov" (Summer Cem featuring RAF Camora)	2018	25	27	60		Endstufe
"Nese Don" (Azet and Zuna featuring RAF Camora)	2019	45	—	—		Super Plus
"Nummer" (Ufo361 featuring RAF Camora)	2019	2	2	10		Wave
"Zove Vienna" (Jala Brat featuring Buba Corelli & RAF Camora)	2019	36	—	—		99
"Fratello" (Ghetto Phénomène featuring RAF Camora)	2019	21	96	63		Money Time

== Other charted songs ==
Title	Year	Peak chart positions			Certifications	Album
Title	Year	AUT	GER	SWI	Certifications	Album
"Ciao Ciao" (with Bonez MC)	2016	—	36	—		Palmen aus Plastik
"Erblindet" (with Bonez MC)	2016	—	37	—		Palmen aus Plastik
"Skimaske" (with Bonez MC featuring Gzuz)	2016	—	45	—		Palmen aus Plastik
"Evil" (with Bonez MC featuring Tommy Lee Sparta)	2016	—	57	—		Palmen aus Plastik
"Attackieren" (with Bonez MC featuring Hanybal)	2016	—	59	—		Palmen aus Plastik
"Cabriolet" (with Bonez MC)	2016	—	62	—		Palmen aus Plastik
"Killa" (with Bonez MC featuring D-Flame)	2016	—	68	—		Palmen aus Plastik
"Vaporizer" (with Bonez MC featuring Trettmann)	2016	—	73	—		Palmen aus Plastik
"Dankbarkeit" (with Bonez MC)	2016	—	74	—		Palmen aus Plastik
"Daneben" (with Bonez MC featuring Trettmann)	2016	—	86	—		Palmen aus Plastik
"Intro" (with Bonez MC featuring Trettmann)	2016	—	98	—		Palmen aus Plastik
"Skandale" (with Bonez MC & Gzuz)	2016	—	25	48	BVMI: Gold	Tannen aus Plastik
"Atramis" (with Bonez MC featuring Bausa)	2016	—	36	—	BVMI: Gold	Tannen aus Plastik
"Verräter" (with Bonez MC featuring Bausa)	2016	—	55	—		Tannen aus Plastik
"Roots" (featuring Gentleman)	2017	36	42	52		Anthrazit
"Anthrazit"	2017	61	56	—		Anthrazit
"Entertainment" (featuring KC Rebell)	2017	65	63	—		Anthrazit
"Augenblick" (featuring Bonez MC)	2017	62	65	—		Anthrazit
"Vienna"	2017	23	76	—		Anthrazit
"Money" (featuring Ufo361)	2017	73	83	—		Anthrazit
"Donna Imma"	2017	69	88	—		Anthrazit
"Niemals" (featuring Kontra K)	2017	—	90	—		Anthrazit
"Teflon" (featuring Bonez MC)	2017	—	95	—		Anthrazit
"Waffen" (featuring Bonez MC, Gzuz & Ufo361)	2017	45	21	47	BVMI: Gold	Anthrazit RR
"Nummer unterdrückt" (with Bonez MC)	2018	1	3	7		Palmen aus Plastik 2
"Ja Mann!" (with Bonez MC)	2018	4	5	—		Palmen aus Plastik 2
"Kompanie" (with Bonez MC featuring Hanybal)	2018	5	7	—		Palmen aus Plastik 2
"Prominent" (with Bonez MC)	2018	6	8	9		Palmen aus Plastik 2
"Von ihnen gelernt" (with Bonez MC)	2018	8	10	—		Palmen aus Plastik 2
"Alien" (with Bonez MC)	2018	9	11	—		Palmen aus Plastik 2
"Nein" (with Bonez MC)	2018	11	13	—		Palmen aus Plastik 2
"MDMA" (with Bonez MC)	2018	12	14	—		Palmen aus Plastik 2
"100" (with Bonez MC featuring Trettmann and Kitschkrieg)	2018	14	15	—		Palmen aus Plastik 2
"Krimineller" (with Bonez MC featuring Kontra K)	2018	13	17	—		Palmen aus Plastik 2
"Prophezeit" (with Bonez MC)	2018	18	21	—		Palmen aus Plastik 2
"Intro" (with Bonez MC)	2018	42	49	—		Palmen aus Plastik 2
"Unnormal" (featuring Bonez MC)	2019	5	13	13		Zenit
"Es geht voran" (featuring Bonez MC)	2020	—	20	25		Zenit RR
"OK, OK" (featuring KC Rebell)	2020	—	—	32		Zenit RR
"Fefe 488" (featuring Lent)	2020	—	—	32		Zenit RR
"Zukunft"	2021	1	4	5		Zukunft
"Realität"	2021	8	—	26		Zukunft
"Chromosom"	2021	9	—	43		Zukunft
"Vergesse nie die Street" (featuring Ahmad Amin)	2021	17	94	97		Zukunft
"Wien" (featuring Yung Hurn)	2023	1	—	—		XV

== Guest appearances ==
List of non-single guest appearances, with other performing artists, showing year released and album name
Title	Year	Other artist(s)	Album
"Beatlefield Allstars 2"	2008	D-Bo, Bizzy Montana, Chakuza, Marc Reis & Pireli	None
"Bitte Guck nicht"	2009	D-Bo	None
"Luft?"	2009	D-Bo & Nazar	Die Lüge der Freiheit
"Sehnsucht?"	2009	D-Bo	Die Lüge der Freiheit
"Freiheit?"	2009	D-Bo	Die Lüge der Freiheit
"Össi Ö"	2009	Nazar, Chakuza	Paradox
"Warum machen Sie das?"	2010	Manuellsen, Nazar	M. Bilal 2010
"Katapult"	2010	Summer Cem, Kollegah	Feierabend
"Headshot"	2017	BTNG, Bonez MC	Black Mamba
"High Life"	2017	Bonez MC, Gzuz, Maxwell	Sampler 4
"Erober die Welt"	2018	Ufo361, Gzuz	808
"Mood" (Remix)	2022	Makar	None

== Music videos ==
=== As lead artist ===
List of music videos as lead artist, showing directors
Title	Year	Director(s)	Ref.
"Winner"	2009	Unknown	
"Killabizzz" (with Nazar)	2010	Unknown	
"Artkore" (with Nazar)	2010	Unknown	
"Independenza"	2010	Unknown	
"Fallen" (featuring Nazar)	2012	Nazar Films	
"Wie kannst du nur"	2012	Unknown	
"Tumor"	2012	Nazar Films	
"Schwarze Sonne" (featuring Vega & Prinz Pi)	2013	Unknown	
"Klepto" (with Chakuza & Joshi Mizu)	2014	Shaho Casado	
"T.R.I.P. 2" (with Joshi Mizu)	2014	3Nity Films	
"Ghøst"	2016	Shaho Casado	
"NOAH"	2016	Shaho Casado	
"Dämonen"	2016	Shaho Casado	
"Geschichte" (featuring Bonez MC)	2016	Shaho Casado	
"Palmen aus Plastik" (with Bonez MC)	2016	Shaho Casado	
"Mörder" (with Bonez MC featuring Gzuz)	2016	Shaho Casado	
"Ohne mein Team" (with Bonez MC featuring Maxwell)	2016	Shaho Casado	
"Palmen aus Gold" (with Bonez MC)	2016	Shaho Casado	
"An ihnen vorbei" (with Bonez MC)	2016	Shaho Casado	
"Kontrollieren" (featuring Bonez MC, Gzuz & Maxwell)	2017	Shaho Casado	
"Alles probiert" (featuring Bonez MC)	2017	Shaho Casado	
"Bye, Bye"	2017	Shaho Casado	
"Andere Liga"	2017	Shaho Casado	
"Sag Nix"	2017	Shaho Casado	
"Gotham City"	2017	Shaho Casado	
"Corleone"	2018	Shaho Casado	
"500 PS" (with Bonez MC)	2018	Shaho Casado	
"Risiko" (with Bonez MC)	2018	Shaho Casado	
"Kokain" (with Bonez MC featuring Gzuz)	2018	Shaho Casado	
"100%" (with Senidah)	2019	Shaho Casado	

=== As featured artist ===
List of music videos as featured artist, showing directors
Title	Year	Director(s)	Ref.
"Stress mit mir" (Maxwell featuring RAF Camora)	2017	Shaho Casado	
"Nema bolje" (Jala Brat & Buba Corelli featuring RAF Camora)	2017	Toxic Entertainment	
"Fame" (Kontra K featuring RAF Camora)	2018	Shaho Casado	
"Toto" (Noizy featuring RAF Camora)	2018	Shaho Casado	
"Zove Vienna" (Jala Brat featuring Buba Corelli & RAF Camora)	2019	New Era Digital Studio	
