= Bonez MC discography =

Discography of German rapper Bonez MC

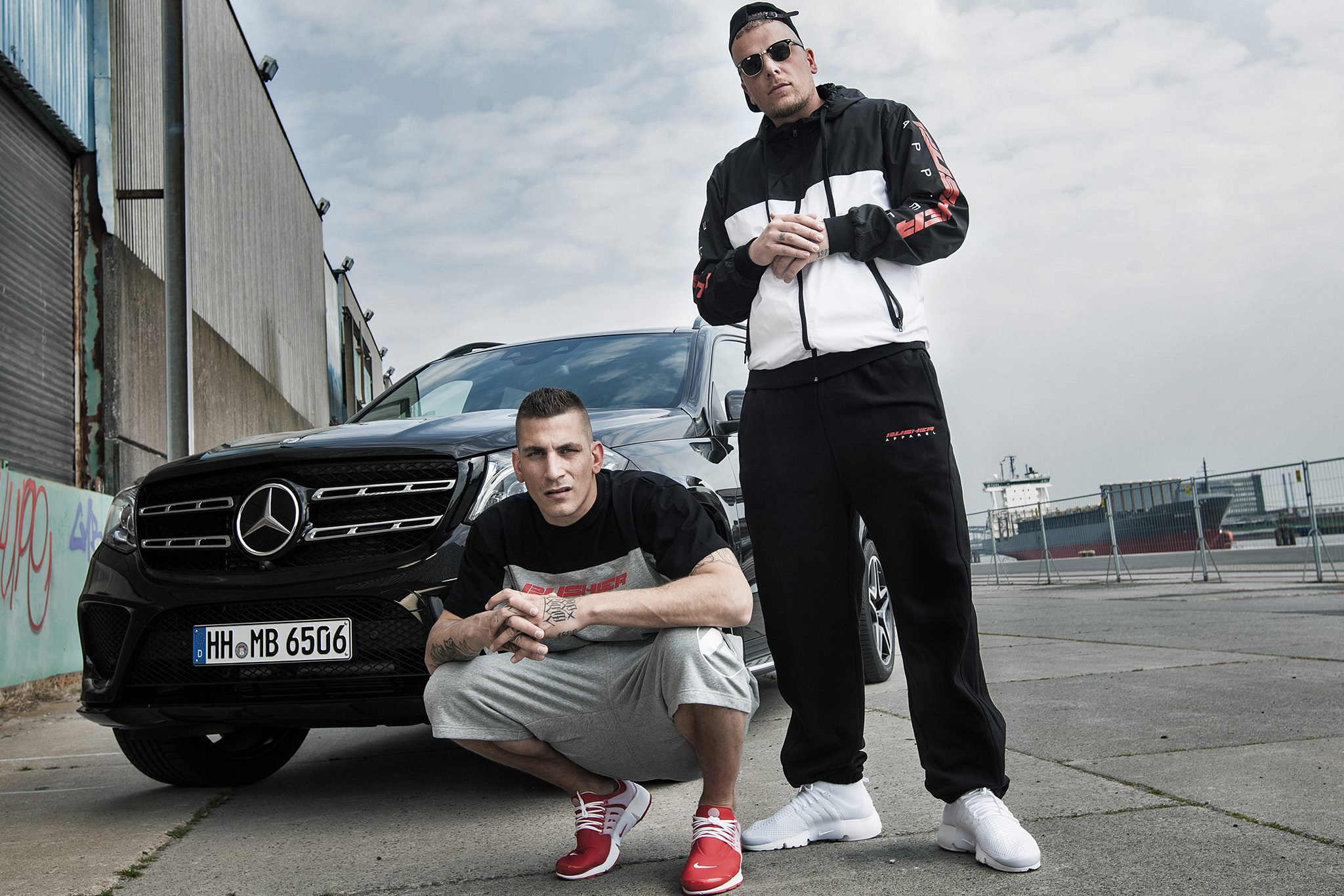
- Bonez MC with Gzuz (2016)
- Studio albums: 4
- EPs: 3
- Singles: 34
- Mixtapes: 1
- Collaborative albums: 6

German rapper Bonez MC has released four studio albums and five collaborative albums. He was awarded for sales of 6.6 million units in Austria, Germany and Switzerland.

== Albums ==
=== Studio albums ===
List of studio albums, with selected chart positions and certifications
Title	Album details	Peak chart positions			Certifications
Title	Album details	GER	AUT	SWI	Certifications
Krampfhaft kriminell	Released: 16 November 2012; Label: Toprott Muzik; Formats: CD, digital download	60	—	—	
Hollywood	Released: 11 September 2020; Label: 187 Strassenbande / Vertigo Berlin; Formats: CD, digital download	1	1	1	BVMI: Gold
Hollywood Uncut	Released: 30 October 2020; Label: 187 Strassenbande / Vertigo Berlin; Formats: CD, digital download	1	2	7	
Gameboy	Released: 30 October 2024; Label: 187 Strassenbande; Formats: CD, digital download	2	1	2	

=== Collaborative albums ===
List of collaborative albums, with selected chart positions and certifications
Title	Album details	Peak chart positions			Certifications
Title	Album details	GER	AUT	SWI	Certifications
Zwei Assis trumpfen auf (with Acht Vier)	Released: 2007; Label: Self-released	—	—	—	
High & Hungrig (with Gzuz)	Released: 23 May 2014; Label: Distributionz; Formats: CD, digital download	9	28	36	
High & Hungrig 2 (with Gzuz)	Released: 27 May 2016; Label: Auf!Keinen!Fall!; Formats: CD, digital download	1	2	2	BVMI: Platinum
Palmen aus Plastik (with RAF Camora)	Released: 9 September 2016; Label: Auf!Keinen!Fall!; Formats: CD, digital download	1	2	1	BVMI: 2× Platinum; IFPI: Gold
Palmen aus Plastik 2 (with RAF Camora)	Released: 5 October 2018; Label: 187 Strassenbande; Formats: CD, digital download	1	1	1	BVMI: Gold; IFPI: Gold
Palmen aus Plastik 3 (with RAF Camora)	Released: 9 September 2022; Label: 187 Strassenbande; Formats: CD, digital download	1	1	2	
High & Hungrig 3 (with Gzuz)	Released: 28 April 2023; Label: 187 Strassenbande; Formats: CD, digital download	1	1	1	

=== EPs ===
List of EPs
Title	Album details
187 Strassen Bande	Released: 2006; Label: Independent; Formats: Free download
Auf Teufel komm raus	Released: 2013; Label: Independent; Formats: CD
Vulcano EP (with RAF Camora)	Released: 5 October 2018; Label: Vertigo Berlin; Formats: CD, digital download

=== Mixtapes ===
- 2008: Mehr geht nicht

== Singles ==
Title	Year	Peak chart positions			Certifications	Album
Title	Year	GER	AUT	SWI	Certifications	Album
"Palmen aus Plastik" (with RAF Camora)	2016	10	51	66	BVMI: 3× Gold	Palmen aus Plastik
"Ruhe nach dem Sturm" (with RAF Camora)	2016	42	—	—	BVMI: Gold	Palmen aus Plastik
"Mörder" (with RAF Camora featuring Gzuz)	2016	20	67	—	BVMI: Platinum	Palmen aus Plastik
"Ohne mein Team" (with RAF Camora featuring Maxwell)	2016	7	34	58	BVMI: Diamond; IFPI: Gold	Palmen aus Plastik
"Palmen aus Gold" (with RAF Camora)	2016	7	35	35	BVMI: Diamond	Tannen aus Plastik
"An ihnen vorbei" (with RAF Camora featuring Maxwell)	2016	8	48	34	BVMI: Platinum	Tannen aus Plastik
"Mit den Jungz" (with Gzuz & Lx)	2017	11	45	62	BVMI: Platinum	Sampler 4
"Glaub mir"	2017	28	65	74		non-album single
"500 PS" (with RAF Camora)	2018	1	2	4	BVMI: Diamond; IFPI: Platinum	Palmen aus Plastik 2
"Risiko" (with RAF Camora)	2018	2	2	2	BVMI: Gold; IFPI: Gold	Palmen aus Plastik 2
"Kokain" (with RAF Camora featuring Gzuz)	2018	1	1	3	IFPI: Gold	Palmen aus Plastik 2
"Dschinni" (with Gringo)	2019	16	22	48		non-album singles
"1K Shotz" (with SosMula)	2019	21	—	41		non-album singles
"Zu echt" (with Mortel)	2019	49	57	98		non-album singles
"Honda Civic" (with The Cratez)	2019	5	3	4		Nonstop
"Shotz Fired"	2020	4	1	6	BVMI: Gold	non-album single
"Roadrunner"	2020	1	1	2	BVMI: Gold	Hollywood
"In meinem Benz" (with AK Ausserkontrolle)	2020	1	1	11	BVMI: Platinum	A.S.S.N. 2
"Big Body Benz"	2020	1	1	2	BVMI: Gold	Hollywood
"Tilidin weg"	2020	3	2	5		Hollywood
"Fuckst mich nur ab"	2020	1	2	4	BVMI: Gold	Hollywood
"Niemals unter 1000" (featuring LX)	2020	4	6	11		Hollywood Uncut
"Angeklagt"	2020	1	1	2		Hollywood Uncut
"Kaktus" (with Ramo)	2020	43	—	84		Non-album singles
"7" (with Ufo361)	2021	2	1	7		Non-album singles
"Extasy" (with Frauenarzt)	2021	1	3	11	BVMI: Platinum	Non-album singles
"Blaues Licht" (with RAF Camora)	2021	1	1	2		Zukunft II
"Cinnamon Roll" (with Gzuz)	2023	3	1	10		High & Hungrig 3
"So"	2023	4	1	10		Non-album single

== Other charted songs ==
Title	Year	Peak chart positions			Certifications	Album
Title	Year	GER	AUT	SWI	Certifications	Album
"Blättchen und Ganja" (with Gzuz)	2016	60	—	—		High & Hungrig 2
"Meine Couch" (with Gzuz)	2016	73	—	—		High & Hungrig 2
"Intro" (with Gzuz)	2016	75	—	—		High & Hungrig 2
"Wolke 7" (with Gzuz)	2016	78	—	—		High & Hungrig 2
"Hauptsache laut" (with Gzuz feat. Hanybal)	2016	81	—	—		High & Hungrig 2
"Model" (with Gzuz feat. Maxwell)	2016	85	—	—		High & Hungrig 2
"Rum Cola" (with Gzuz)	2016	87	—	—		High & Hungrig 2
"Das Gefühl" (with Gzuz)	2016	89	—	—		High & Hungrig 2
"Ciao Ciao" (with RAF Camora)	2016	36	—	—		Palmen aus Plastik
"Erblindet" (with RAF Camora)	2016	37	—	—		Palmen aus Plastik
"Skimaske" (with RAF Camora feat. Gzuz)	2016	45	—	—		Palmen aus Plastik
"Evil" (with RAF Camora feat. Tommy Lee Sparta)	2016	57	—	—		Palmen aus Plastik
"Attackieren" (with RAF Camora feat. Hanybal)	2016	59	—	—		Palmen aus Plastik
"Cabriolet" (with RAF Camora)	2016	62	—	—		Palmen aus Plastik
"Killa" (with RAF Camora feat. D-Flame)	2016	68	—	—		Palmen aus Plastik
"Vaporizer" (with RAF Camora feat. Trettmann)	2016	73	—	—		Palmen aus Plastik
"Dankbarkeit" (with RAF Camora)	2016	74	—	—		Palmen aus Plastik
"Daneben" (with RAF Camora feat. Trettmann)	2016	86	—	—		Palmen aus Plastik
"Intro" (with RAF Camora)	2016	98	—	—		Palmen aus Plastik
"10 Jahre" (with RAF Camora, LX, Gzuz & Maxwell)	2016	24	—	—	BVMI: Gold	Palmen aus Plastik – Winteredition (Tannen aus Plastik)
"Skandale" (with RAF Camora and Gzuz)	2016	25	—	—	BVMI: Gold	Palmen aus Plastik – Winteredition (Tannen aus Plastik)
"Atramis" (with RAF Camora feat. Bausa)	2016	36	—	—	BVMI: Gold	Palmen aus Plastik – Winteredition (Tannen aus Plastik)
"Großes Kaliber" (with Gzuz feat. Kontra K)	2016	40	—	—		Palmen aus Plastik – Winteredition (Tannen aus Plastik)
"Lebenslauf" (with Gzuz)	2016	53	—	—		Palmen aus Plastik – Winteredition (Tannen aus Plastik)
"Verräter" (with RAF Camora)	2016	55	—	—		Palmen aus Plastik – Winteredition (Tannen aus Plastik)
"Meine Sprache" (with Gzuz & Sa4 feat. RAF Camora)	2016	60	—	—		Palmen aus Plastik – Winteredition (Tannen aus Plastik)
"Millionär" (with Gzuz)	2017	2	29	32	BVMI: 3× Gold	Sampler 4
"High Life" (with RAF Camora, Gzuz & Maxwell)	2017	30	67	—: BVMI: Gold		Sampler 4
"Sitzheizung" (with Gzuz)	2017	35	—	—	BVMI: Gold	Sampler 4
"100er Batzen" (with Sa4, Gzuz & LX)	2017	45	—	—		Sampler 4
"Zeit ist Geld" (with Sa4 & Gzuz)	2017	61	—	—		Sampler 4
"Lächeln"	2017	53	—	—	BVMI: Gold	Sampler 4
"Was ist passiert?!" (with LX & Gzuz)	2017	72	—	—		Sampler 4
"Ballermann" (with LX & Gzuz)	2017	81	—	—		Sampler 4
"Nummer unterdrückt" (with RAF Camora)	2018	3	1	7	BVMI: Gold	Palmen aus Plastik 2
"Ja Mann!" (with RAF Camora)	2018	5	4	—		Palmen aus Plastik 2
"Kompanie" (with RAF Camora featuring Hanybal)	2018	7	5	—		Palmen aus Plastik 2
"Prominent" (with RAF Camora)	2018	8	6	9		Palmen aus Plastik 2
"Von ihnen gelernt" (with RAF Camora)	2018	10	8	—		Palmen aus Plastik 2
"Alien" (with RAF Camora)	2018	11	9	—		Palmen aus Plastik 2
"Nein" (with RAF Camora)	2018	13	11	—		Palmen aus Plastik 2
"MDMA" (with RAF Camora)	2018	14	12	—		Palmen aus Plastik 2
"100" (with RAF Camora featuring Trettmann and Kitschkrieg)	2018	15	14	—		Palmen aus Plastik 2
"Krimineller" (with RAF Camora)	2018	17	13	—		Palmen aus Plastik 2
"Prophezeit" (with RAF Camora)	2018	21	18	—		Palmen aus Plastik 2
"Intro" (with RAF Camora)	2018	49	42	—		Palmen aus Plastik 2
"Letzte Nacht" (with LX, Sa4 and Maxwell)	2018	82	71	—		Vulcano EP
"Unnormal" (RAF Camora featuring Bonez MC)	2019	13	5	13		Zenit
"Es geht voran" (with RAF Camora)	2020	20	5	25		Zenit RR
"Verkackt" (with Gzuz)	2020	7	—	—		Gzuz
"Ihr Hobby" (with Maxwell)	2020	3	3	8		Hollywood
"Papa ist in Hollywood"	2020	42	6	11		Hollywood
"187 Gang" (featuring Gzuz, Maxwell, LX and Sa4)	2020	52	—	—		Hollywood
"Jetski"	2020	15	9	16		Hollywood Uncut
"Raubüberfall"	2020	—	21	47		Hollywood Uncut

Featured in

Year	Title	Chart			Album
Year	Title	GER	AUT	SWI	Album
2017	"Plem Plem" (Kontra K feat. RAF Camora & Bonez MC)	46	—	—	Kontra K album Gute Nacht
2017	"Kontrollieren" (RAF Camora feat. Bonez MC, Gzuz & Maxwell)	11	32	46	RAF Camora album Anthrazit
2017	"Alles probiert" (RAF Camora feat. Bonez MC)	37	33	88	RAF Camora album Anthrazit
2017	"GottSeiDank" (Trettmann feat. Bonez MC & RAF Camora)	31	56	—	Trettmann album #DIY
2017	"Schnell machen" (Sa4 feat. Bonez MC & Gzuz)	11	25	36	Sa4 album Neue deutsche Quelle
2017	"1 Schuss" (Ufo361 feat. Bonez MC)	23	60	84	
2018	"Was erlebt" (Gzuz feat. Bonez MC)	3	2	18	Gzuz album Wolke 7
2018	"Über Nacht" (Ufo361 feat. Bonez MC, Maxwell & Ufo361)	6	6	22	Gzuz album Wolke 7
2018	"HaifischNikez Allstars" (LX and Maxwell featuring Bonez MC, Gzuz and Sa4)	3	5	9	
2019	"Autopilot" (Milonair featuring Bonez MC)	20	22	48	
2020	"International Criminal" (KitschKrieg featuring Bonez MC and Vybz Kartel)	6	5	23	

Other charting songs as featured in

Year	Title	Chart			Album
Year	Title	GER	AUT	SWI	Album
2016	"Baller los" (Hanybal feat. Bonez MC)	83	—	—	Hanybal album Haramstufe Rot
2016	"Spielplatz" (Maxwell feat. Bonez MC)	51	—	70	Maxwell album Safari
2016	"Safari" (Maxwell feat. RAF Camora & Bonez MC)	29	—	51	Maxwell album Safari
2017	"Jim Beam & Voddi" (AK Ausserkontrolle feat. Bonez MC)	83	—	—	AK Ausserkontrolle album A.S.S.N.
2017	"Sie will" (PA Sports feat. RAF Camora & Bonez MC)	65	—	—	Verloren im Paradies
2017	"Augenblick" (RAF Camora feat. Bonez MC)	65	62	—	RAF Camora album Anthrazit
2017	"Allstars" (Sa4 feat. Maxwell, Gzuz, LX & Bonez MC)	15	40	61	Sa4 album Neue deutsche Quelle
2017	"Waffen" (RAF Camora feat. Bonez MC, Gzuz, & Ufo361)	21	45	47	RAF Camora album Anthrazit RR
2018	"Schüsse aus'm Benz" (Olexesh feat. Bonez MC)	47	—	91	Olexesh album Rolexesh
2018	"Auf einmal sind alle korrekt" (18 Karat feat. Bonez MC)	73	—	—	18 Karat album Geld Gold Gras
