= List of number-one hits of 2018 (Germany) =

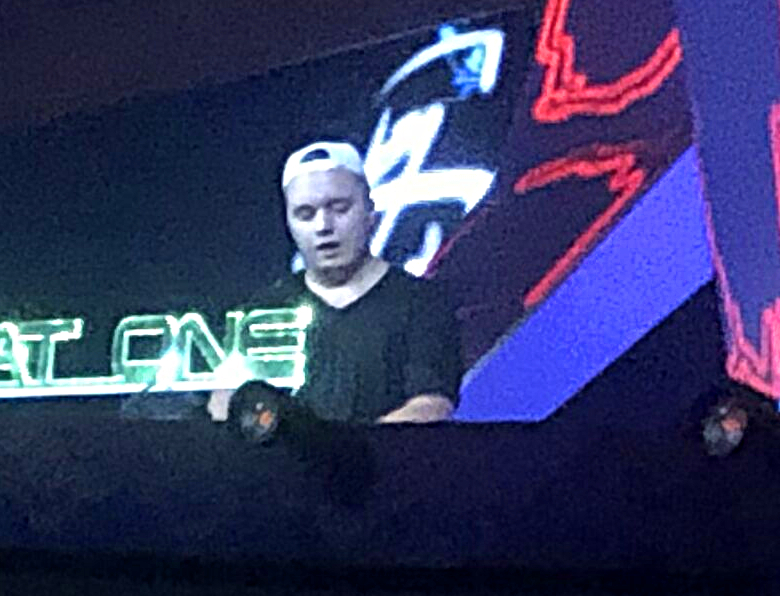
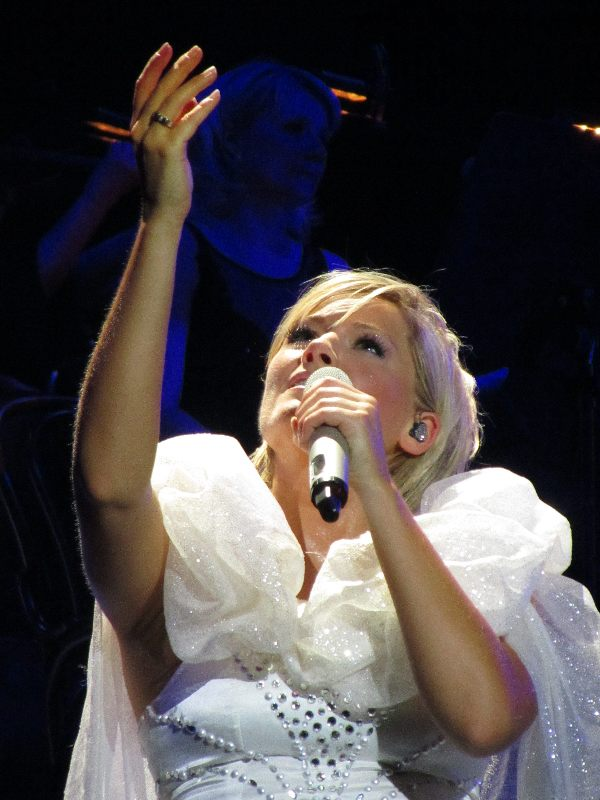
Dynoro (pictured) and Gigi D'Agostino's "In My Mind" became the best-performing single of 2018, while Helene Fischer's eponymous album became the best-performing album of the year for the second consecutive year.

The Media Control charts are record charts compiled by Media Control on behalf of the German record industry. They include the "Single Top 100" and the "Album Top 100" chart. The chart week runs from Friday to Thursday, and the chart compilations are published on Tuesday for the record industry. The entire top 100 singles and top 100 albums are officially released the following Friday by Media Control. The charts are based on sales of physical singles and albums from retail outlets as well as permanent music downloads.

== Number-one hits by week ==
Key
†	Indicates best-performing single and album of 2018

Issue date	Song	Artist	Ref.	Album	Artist	Ref.
5 January	"Perfect"	Ed Sheeran		÷	Ed Sheeran	
12 January	"Perfect"	Ed Sheeran		÷	Ed Sheeran	
19 January	"Perfect"	Ed Sheeran		Wir werden immer mehr!	Klubbb3	
26 January	"Perfect"	Ed Sheeran		Deja Vu	Mike Singer	
2 February	"Perfect"	Ed Sheeran		Die Unendlichkeit	Tocotronic	
9 February	"Perfect"	Ed Sheeran		Man of the Woods	Justin Timberlake	
16 February	"Was du Liebe nennst"	Bausa		Deines Glückes Schmied	Goitzsche Front	
23 February	"For You"	Liam Payne and Rita Ora		Fifty Shades Freed – The Final Chapter	Various artists	
2 March	"God's Plan"	Drake		A.i.d.S. Royal	B-Tight	
9 March	"Magisch"	Olexesh featuring Edin		Rolexesh	Olexesh	
16 March	"Friends"	Marshmello and Anne-Marie		Das Beste von Fantasy – Das große Jubiläumsalbum mit allen Hits!	Fantasy	
23 March	"Friends"	Marshmello and Anne-Marie		Rivalen und Rebellen	Frei.Wild	
30 March	"Friends"	Marshmello and Anne-Marie		Rivalen und Rebellen	Frei.Wild	
6 April	"Friends"	Marshmello and Anne-Marie		Fast Life	Azet	
13 April	"5 Songs in einer Nacht"	Capital Bra		America	Thirty Seconds to Mars	
20 April	"Friends"	Marshmello and Anne-Marie		808	Ufo361	
27 April	"One Kiss"	Calvin Harris and Dua Lipa		44/876	Sting and Shaggy	
4 May	"Neymar"	Capital Bra featuring Ufo361		Helene Fischer †	Helene Fischer	
11 May	"Neymar"	Capital Bra featuring Ufo361		Helene Fischer †	Helene Fischer	
18 May	"Neymar"	Capital Bra featuring Ufo361		Erde & Knochen	Kontra K	
25 May	"Phänomenal"	Pietro Lombardi		And Justice for None	Five Finger Death Punch	
1 June	"One Night Stand"	Capital Bra		Wolke 7	Gzuz	
8 June	"One Night Stand"	Capital Bra		Vergiss mein nicht	Andreas Gabalier	
15 June	"Berlin lebt"	Capital Bra		Vergiss mein nicht	Andreas Gabalier	
22 June	"Je ne parle pas français (Beatgees Remix)"	Namika featuring Black M		Vergiss mein nicht	Andreas Gabalier	
29 June	"Je ne parle pas français (Beatgees Remix)"	Namika featuring Black M		Berlin lebt	Capital Bra	
6 July	"Solo"	Clean Bandit featuring Demi Lovato		Bratans aus Favelas	Juri	
13 July	"Für euch alle"	Bushido featuring Samra and Capital Bra		Kopf aus – Herz an	Eloy de Jong	
20 July	"In My Mind" †	Dynoro and Gigi D'Agostino		110 Karat	Die Amigos	
27 July	"In My Mind" †	Dynoro and Gigi D'Agostino		The Sacrament of Sin	Powerwolf	
3 August	"In My Mind" †	Dynoro and Gigi D'Agostino		Endstufe	Summer Cem	
10 August	"Melodien"	Capital Bra featuring Juju		Schlager	Vanessa Mai	
17 August	"In My Mind" †	Dynoro and Gigi D'Agostino		Platin war gestern	Kollegah and Farid Bang	
24 August	"In My Mind" †	Dynoro and Gigi D'Agostino		Brot und Spiele	Saltatio Mortis	
31 August	"In My Mind" †	Dynoro and Gigi D'Agostino		Handgepäck I	Clueso	
7 September	"In My Mind" †	Dynoro and Gigi D'Agostino		1982	Marteria and Casper	
14 September	"In My Mind" †	Dynoro and Gigi D'Agostino		Egypt Station	Paul McCartney	
21 September	"Kokain"	Bonez MC and RAF Camora featuring Gzuz		Schlaftabletten, Rotwein V	Alligatoah	
28 September	"In My Mind" †	Dynoro and Gigi D'Agostino		Alles oder Nix II	Xatar	
5 October	"In My Mind" †	Dynoro and Gigi D'Agostino		Mythos	Bushido	
12 October	"500 PS"	Bonez MC and RAF Camora		Palmen aus Plastik 2	Bonez MC and RAF Camora	
19 October	"In My Mind" †	Dynoro and Gigi D'Agostino		Alles ist jetzt	Bosse	
26 October	"Roli Glitzer Glitzer"	Capital Bra featuring Luciano and Eno		Y.A.L.A	Genetikk	
2 November	"Standard"	KitschKrieg featuring Trettmann, Gringo, Ufo361 and Gzuz		Black Is Beautiful	The BossHoss	
9 November	"Standard"	KitschKrieg featuring Trettmann, Gringo, Ufo361 and Gzuz		Live und deutlich	BAP	
16 November	"Cataleya"	Samra		Tumult	Herbert Grönemeyer	
23 November	"Sweet but Psycho"	Ava Max		We Got Love	The Kelly Family	
30 November	"Baller los"	Mero		Tumult	Herbert Grönemeyer	
7 December	"Sweet but Psycho"	Ava Max		Tumult	Herbert Grönemeyer	
14 December	"Sweet but Psycho"	Ava Max		Monument	Kollegah	
21 December	"Sweet but Psycho"	Ava Max		MTV Unplugged 2: Live vom Atlantik (Zweimaster Edition)	Udo Lindenberg	
28 December	"Benzema"	Capital Bra		MTV Unplugged 2: Live vom Atlantik (Zweimaster Edition)	Udo Lindenberg	

== See also ==
- List of number-one hits (Germany)
- List of German airplay number-one songs
