= List of number-one hip-hop albums of 2019 (Germany) =

The official German hip-hop album charts are record charts compiled by GfK Entertainment GmbH on behalf of Bundesverband Musikindustrie (Federal Association of Phonographic Industry). The hip-hop charts only include albums. The chart week runs from Friday to Thursday with the official chart being published on the following Wednesday. The charts are based on sales of physical albums from retail outlets as well as permanent music downloads and streaming.

== Chart history ==
Issue date	Album	Artist(s)	Ref.
5 January	Palmen aus Plastik 2	Bonez MC & RAF Camora	
11 January	Palmen aus Plastik 2	Bonez MC & RAF Camora	
18 January	Palmen aus Plastik 2	Bonez MC & RAF Camora	
25 January	YPSILON	Yassin	
1 February	Da nich Für!	Dendemann	
8 February	11ta Stock Sound 2	Kurdo	
15 February	KKS	Kool Savas	
22 February	KKS	Kool Savas	
1 March	Aggroswing	B-Tight	
8 March	Palmen aus Plastik 2	Bonez MC & RAF Camora	
15 March	Superplus	Azet & Zuna	
22 March	Ya Hero Ya Mero	Mero	
29 March	OG mit Herz	Herzog	
5 April	Colucci	Fler	
12 April	Ya Hero Ya Mero	Mero	
18 April	CB6	Capital Bra	
26 April	Hasso	KC Rebell	
3 May	CB6	Capital Bra	
10 May	Fuchs	Eno	
17 May	CB6	Capital Bra	
24 May	CB6	Capital Bra	
31 May	Sie wollten Wasser doch kriegen Benzin	Kontra K	
7 June	Je M'Appelle Kriminell	18 Karat	
14 June	Sie wollten Wasser doch kriegen Benzin	Kontra K	
21 June	Bling Bling	Juju	
28 June	Fieber	Bausa	
5 July	Obststand 2	LX & Maxwell	
12 July	Obststand 2	LX & Maxwell	
19 July	Drama	Shindy	
26 July	Drama	Shindy	
2 August	Drama	Shindy	
9 August	Orsons Island	Die Orsons	
16 August	Wave	Ufo361	
23 August	Der Bozz 2	Azad	
30 August	Wave	Ufo361	
6 September	Millies	Luciano	
13 September	Zeus	Dame	
20 September	Trettmann	Trettmann	
27 September	Supersize	Shirin David	
4 October 2019	Ich & keine Maske	Sido	
11 October 2019	Berlin lebt 2	Capital Bra & Samra	
18 October 2019	Kiox	Kummer	
25 October 2019	Berlin lebt 2	Capital Bra & Samra	
31 October 2019	Platte	Apache 207	
8 November 2019	Zenit	RAF Camora	
15 November 2019	Nur noch Nice	Summer Cem	
22 November 2019	Platte	Apache 207	
29 November 2019	Geist	OG Keemo	
6 December 2019	Outtathisworld – Radio Show Vol. 1	Genetikk	
13 December 2019	Messios	SSIO	
20 December 2019	Alphagene II	Kollegah	
27 December 2019	Carlo Cokxxx Nutten 4	Bushido & Animus	
