= List of artists who reached number one in Austria =

This is a list of recording artists who have reached number one on the singles chart in Austria since January 1989.

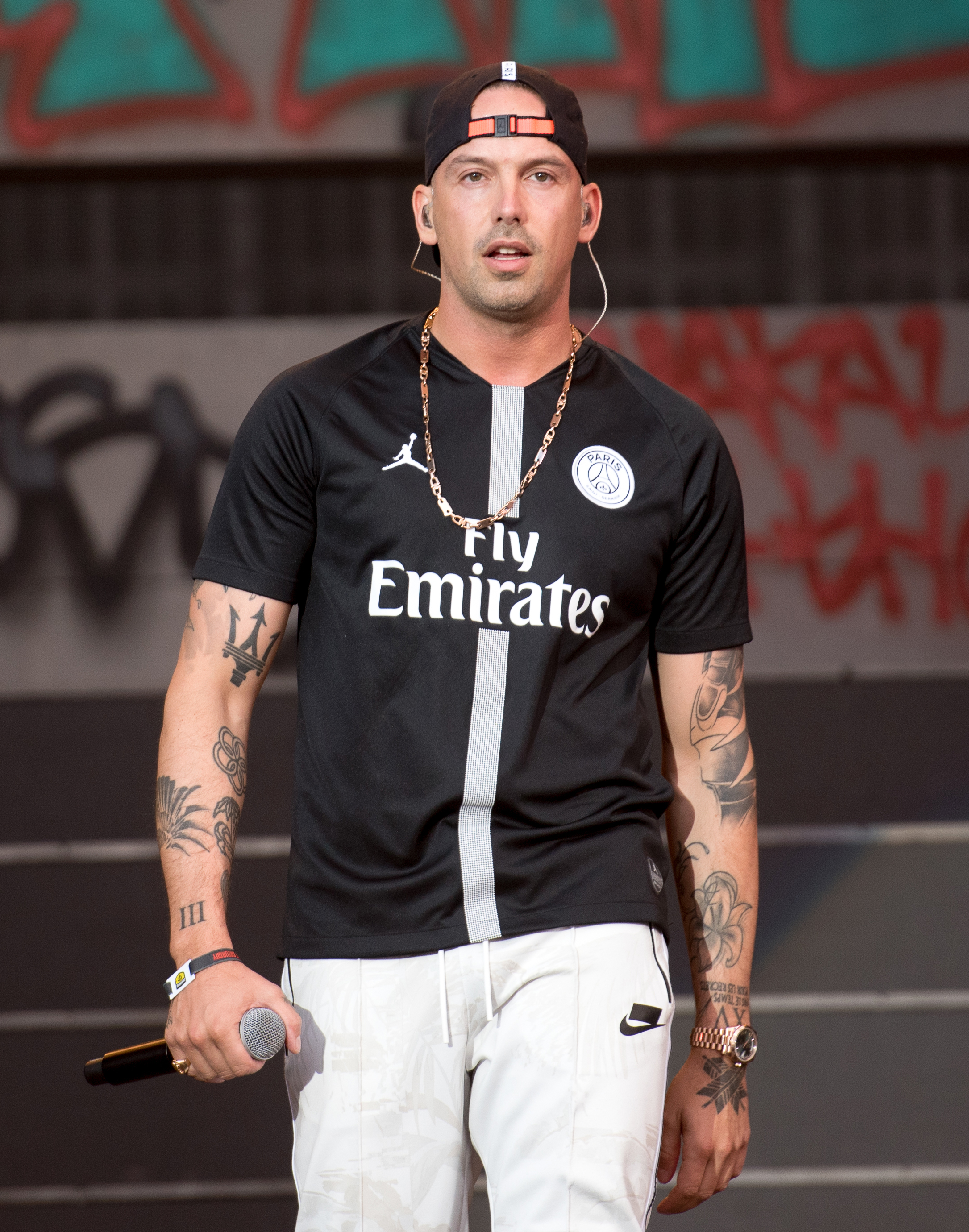
RAF Camora holds the records for the most number-one songs with 19, most by a male artist and by an Austrian artist.

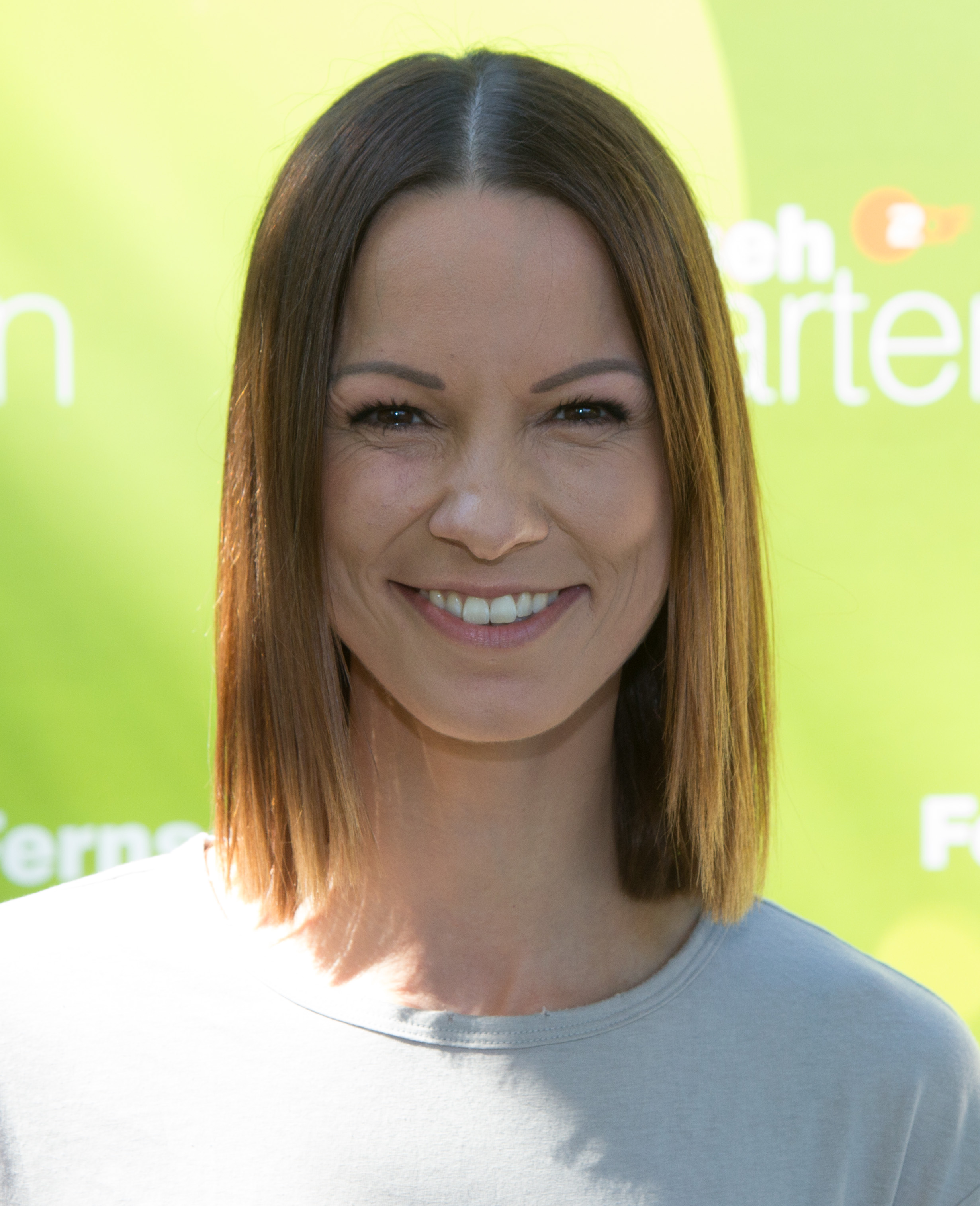
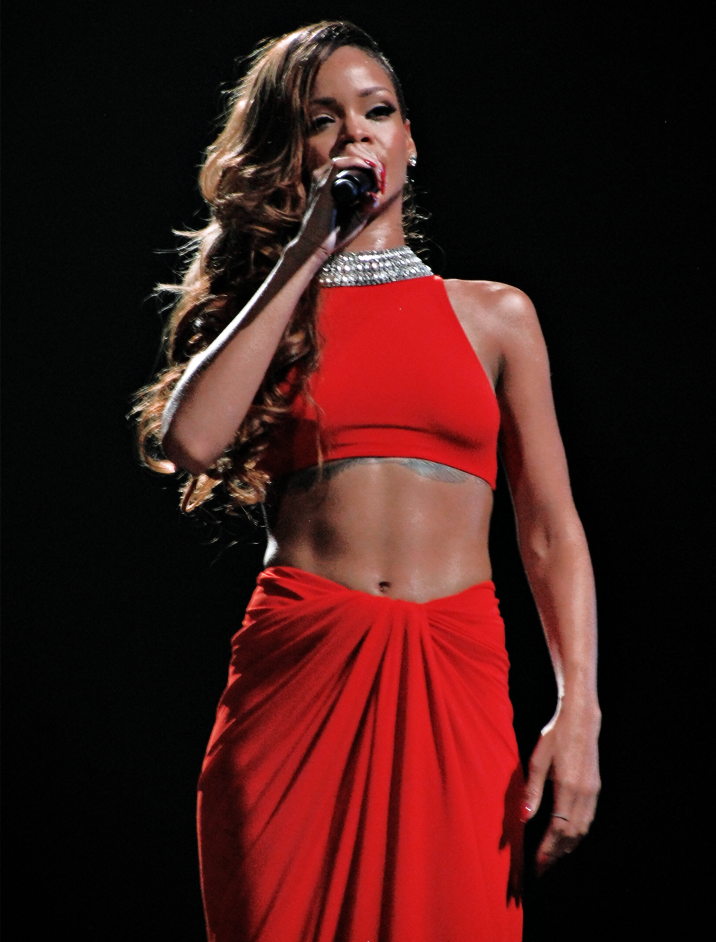
Christina Stürmer and Rihanna are tied the record for the most number-one songs by a female artist with 5

- All acts are listed alphabetically.
- Solo artists are alphabetized by last name (unless they use only their first name, e.g. Akon, listed under A), Groups by group name excluding "a," "an" and "the."
- Featured artists that have been given credit on the record are included

== 0–9 ==
- 112 (1)
- 2 Unlimited (1)
- 4 Non Blondes (1)
- 21 Savage (1)
- 24kGoldn (1)
- 50 Cent (1)
- 220 Kid (1)
- Apache 207 (5)
- Jawsh 685 (1)

== A ==
- Ace of Base (1)
- Bryan Adams (2)
- Adele (2)
- Aerosmith (1)
- Aitch (1)
- AriBeatz (1)
- Afroman (1)
- Christina Aguilera (2)
- Ski Aggu (2)
- AK Ausserkontrolle (1)
- Akon (2)
- Albertino (1)
- Lily Allen (1)
- Dr Alban (2)
- Alexandra Stan (1)
- All-4-One (1)
- Anastacia (1)
- Anne-Marie (2)
- Anton (1)
- Artemas (1)
- Die Ärzte (1)
- Atomic Kitten (1)
- The Avener (1)
- Aventura (1)
- Die Ärzte (1)
- Asaf Avidan (1)
- Avicii (3)
- Axwell & Ingrosso (1)
- Ayliva (1)

== B ==
- Babylon Zoo (1)
- Backstreet Boys (2)
- Bad Bunny (1)
- Badmómzjay (1)
- Bausa (2)
- Robin Beck (1)
- Andreas Bourani (2)
- The Beatles (1)
- Natasha Bedingfield (1)
- Lou Bega (1)
- Bia (1)
- Billen Ted (1)
- Ben (1)
- Lauren Bennett (1)
- Lory "Bonnie" Bianco (1)
- Justin Bieber (5)
- The Black Eyed Peas (4)
- Mary J Blige (1)
- Blumengarten (1)
- James Blunt (2)
- Benson Boone (1)
- The Bosshoss (1)
- Jala Brat (1)
- Bro'Sis (1)
- Dave Brown (1)
- Andrea Bocelli (1)
- Bon Jovi (1)
- Bonez MC (11)
- Bomfunk MC's (1)
- Toni Braxton (1)
- Sarah Brightman (1)
- Burna Boy (1)
- Buddy (1)
- Bushido (1)

== C ==
- C+C Music Factory (1)
- Camila Cabello (1)
- RAF Camora (19)
- Dan Caplen (1)
- Cappella (1)
- Capital Bra (18)
- Mariah Carey (2)
- Cassö (1)
- Yvonne Catterfeld (1)
- Ceren (1)
- Charles & Eddie (1)
- Cher (1)
- Ch!pz (1)
- Melanie C (1)
- Alex C (1)
- Chris Brown (1)
- Nina Chuba (2)
- Clean Bandit (3)
- Bradley Cooper (1)
- Buba Corelli (1)
- Crazy Town (1)
- The Cratez (1)
- Sinéad O'Connor (1)
- Cro (4)
- Culture Beat (1)
- Miley Cyrus (1)

== D ==
- DaBaby (1)
- Gigi D'Agostino (3)
- DCUP (1)
- Daft Punk (1)
- Dara (1)
- Shirin David (3)
- D-Block Europe (1)
- Niklas Dee (1)
- Jason Derulo (2)
- Des'ree (1)
- Janieck Devy (1)
- Dido (2)
- Celine Dion (1)
- Aura Dione (1)
- Iann Dior (1)
- Disturbed (1)
- DJ Robin (1)
- DJ The Wave (1)
- DNA (1)
- Dragonette (1)
- Dua Lipa (1)
- Duck Sauce (1)
- Duffy (1)
- Dynoro (1)

== E ==
- E Nomine (1)
- Eamon (1)
- Edelweiss (2)
- Beatrice Egli (1)
- Eiffel 65 (2)
- El Profesor (1)
- Elton John (1)
- Caro Emerald (1)
- Eminem (6)
- Eno (1)
- Enigma (1)
- Erasure (1)
- Erste Allgemeine Verunsicherung (1)
- Faith Evans (1)
- Nathan Evans (1)
- George Ezra (1)

== F ==
- Die Fantastischen Vier (1)
- Alle Farben (1)
- Fergie (1)
- Tiziano Ferro (1)
- Rainhard Fendrich (1)
- Fettes Brot (1)
- Dominic Fike (1)
- Fine Young Cannibals (1)
- Helene Fischer (1)
- Flo Rida (2)
- Luis Fonsi (2)
- Thomas Forstner (1)
- Fool's Garden (1)
- French Affair (1)
- Freshlyground (1)
- Lost Frequencies (2)
- The Fugees (1)
- Fun (1)
- Nelly Furtado (1)

== G ==
- Andreas Gabalier (1)
- Lady Gaga (4)
- Gayle (1)
- Die Gerd-Show (1)
- Gim (1)
- Jess Glynne (1)
- Gnarls Barkley (1)
- Jess Glynne (1)
- Thomas Godoj (1)
- Hubert von Goisern (1)
- Goleo and Pille (1)
- GoonRock (1)
- Gotye (1)
- Ellie Goulding (1)
- Kenya Grace (1)
- Herbert Grönemeyer (1)
- David Guetta (5)
- Gzuz (3)

== H ==
- Haddaway (1)
- Haiducii (1)
- Calvin Harris (1)
- Hanson (1)
- Mýa (1)
- Luca Hänni (1)
- David Hasselhoff (2)
- Raoul Haspel (1)
- Chesney Hawkes (1)
- Hozier (1)
- Whitney Houston (1)
- James Newton Howard (1)
- Hugel (1)
- Yung Hurn (1)

== I ==
- Imany (1)

== J ==
- JJ (1)
- Felix Jaehn (2)
- Jay-Z (1)
- Jive Bunny and the Mastermixers (1)
- Joker Bra (1)
- Holly Johnson (1)
- Joost (1)
- Juanes (1)
- Juju (2)

== K ==
- Kaoma (1)
- Kasimir1441 (1)
- Kay One (1)
- K'naan (1)
- Leila K (1)
- Professor Kaiser (1)
- Nick Kamen (1)
- Kanui & Lulu (1)
- KC Rebell (3)
- Ronan Keating (1)
- Alicia Keys (1)
- Kesha (2)
- Wiz Khalifa (1)
- Kimbra (1)
- The Kid Laroi (1)
- Kid Rock (1)
- KitschKrieg (1)
- A Klana Indiana (2)
- The KLF (1)
- Klingande (1)
- Katja Krasavice (1)

== L ==
- Laid Back (1)
- Las Ketchup (1)
- Marit Larsen (1)
- Zara Larsson (1)
- Avril Lavigne (1)
- Jennifer Lawrence (1)
- Leona Lewis (2)
- Lil Nas X (2)
- Lilly Wood and the Prick (1)
- Udo Lindenberg (1)
- Linkin Park (1)
- Liquido (1)
- LMFAO (1)
- Pietro Lombardi (2)
- Loreen (1)
- Londonbeat (1)
- Los Del Rio (1)
- Demi Lovato (2)
- Dennis Lloyd (1)
- Lucilectric (1)
- Lucenzo (1)
- Jennifer Lopez (1)
- Loredana (2)
- Los Umbrellos (1)
- Luciano (5)
- Lukas Graham (1)

== M ==
- Amy Macdonald (1)
- Macklemore (1)
- Macloud (3)
- Bobby McFerrin (1)
- Wes (1)
- Mad'House (1)
- Madonna (1)
- Major Lazer (1)
- Makko (1)
- Måneskin (1)
- Maroon 5 (1)
- Bruno Mars (2)
- Marshmello (1)
- Mathea (1)
- Mehrzad Marashi (1)
- Mando Diao (1)
- Sam Martin (2)
- Mattafix (1)
- Ava Max (1)
- Max Brothers (1)
- Tate McRae (2)
- Meat Loaf (1)
- Mark Medlock (1)
- Shawn Mendes (1)
- Mero (5)
- Pras Michel (1)
- Robert Miles (1)
- Milky Chance (1)
- Milli Vanilli (1)
- Nicki Minaj (1)
- Kylie Minogue (1)
- Miksu (3)
- MØ (1)
- Mo-Do (1)
- Janelle Monáe (1)
- Monrose (2)
- Cornelia Mooswalder (1)
- James Morrison (1)
- Mr. Big (1)
- Mr. President (1)
- Mr. Probz (1)
- Olly Murs (1)

== N ==
- Anna Naklab (1)
- Nickelback (1)
- Anne-Marie (2)
- No Angels (3)
- No Mercy (1)

== O ==
- Octavian (1)
- ODB (1)
- Oimara (1)
- OMC (1)
- OneRepublic (1)
- Oomph! (1)
- Olivia (1)
- DJ Ötzi (2)
- Don Omar (1)
- OMI (1)
- One Direction (1)
- Overground (1)
- O-Zone (1)

== P ==
- Nik P. (1)
- Nu Pagadi (1)
- Sean Paul (2)
- Pashanim (1)
- Passenger (1)
- Laura Pausini (1)
- Pentatonix (1)
- Kim Petras (1)
- Oli.P (2)
- Katy Perry (3)
- Gary Pine (1)
- Pink (3)
- Pitbull (3)
- Pizzera & Jaus (1)
- Post Malone (1)
- Power Pack (1)
- Eric Prydz (1)
- PSY (1)
- Puff Daddy (1)
- The Pussycat Dolls (1)
- Charlie Puth (1)

== Q ==
- Iñigo Quintero (1)

== R ==
- Stefan Raab (1)
- Rag'n'Bone Man (1)
- Raye (2)
- Rayvon (1)
- Rednex (2)
- Tobias Regner (1)
- Matthias Reim (1)
- Bebe Rexha (1)
- Rihanna (5)
- The Righteous Brothers (1)
- Right Said Fred (1)
- Rising Girl (1)
- Roddy Ricch (1)
- Olivia Rodrigo (2)
- Rosé (1)
- Marlon Roudette (1)
- Roxette (1)
- Rudimental (1)
- Nate Ruess (1)
- Emilia (1)

== S ==
- Aneta Sablik (1)
- Sak Noel (1)
- Salt-N-Pepa (1)
- Cesár Sampson (1)
- Samra (6)
- Schnuffel (1)
- Daniel Schuhmacher (1)
- Robin Schulz (3)
- Schürze (1)
- Scissor Sisters (1)
- The Script (1)
- Scooter (1)
- Scorpions (1)
- Schnappi (1)
- Seiler und Speer (1)
- Shaggy (1)
- Shakira (4)
- Ed Sheeran (6)
- Shindy (1)
- Sia (2)
- Sido (1)
- Silbermond (1)
- Bob Sinclar (1)
- Sam Smith (1)
- Snap! (1)
- Snoop Dogg (2)
- Sofiane (1)
- Martin Solveig (1)
- Luca-Dante Spadafora (1)
- Britney Spears (3)
- Spice Girls (1)
- Sportfreunde Stiller (1)
- Bruce Springsteen (1)
- Lisa Stansfield (1)
- Starmaniacs (1)
- Rod Stewart (1)
- Sting (1)
- Stromae (1)
- Christina Stürmer (5)
- Harry Styles (1)
- Nena (1)
- Sugababes (1)
- Summer Cem (2)
- Taylor Swift (3)

== T ==
- T-Low (2)
- t.A.T.u (1)
- T.I. (1)
- Taio Cruz (1)
- Tacabro (1)
- Adel Tawil (1)
- Robin Thicke (1)
- Jasmine Thompson (1)
- Michel Teló (1)
- Tic Tac Toe (1)
- Timbaland (1)
- Meghan Trainor (1)
- Triggerfinger (1)
- Die Toten Hosen (1)
- ATC (1)
- Tokio Hotel (4)
- Tones and I (1)
- Emilíana Torrini (1)
- Trackshittaz (2)
- Michael Tschuggnall (1)
- Martin Tungevaag (1)

== U ==
- U2 (1)
- U96 (1)
- UB40 (1)
- Ufo361 (3)
- Unique II (1)
- Uncle Kracker (1)
- Midge Ure (1)
- Usher (1)

== V ==
- Suzanne Vega (1)
- Verena (1)
- Vize (1)

== W ==
- Otto Waalkes (1)
- Marco Wagner (1)
- Alan Walker (2)
- Wanda (1)
- Alex Warren (1)
- Wax (1)
- The Weeknd (1)
- Wet Wet Wet (1)
- Wham! (1)
- Wheatus (1)
- Kim Wilde (1)
- Wildbwoys (1)
- will.i.am (2)
- Freedom Williams (1)
- Pharrell Williams (3)
- Robbie Williams (1)
- Oliver Wimmer (1)
- Kate Winslet (1)
- Conchita Wurst (1)

== Y ==
- Kate Yanai (1)
- Daddy Yankee (1)
- Francesco Yates (1)
- Y-ass (1)
- Yolanda Be Cool (1)
- Younotus (1)

== Z ==
- Zayn (1)
- Måns Zelmerlöw (1)
- Zlatko (1)

== See also ==
- Ö3 Austria Top 40
