= List of number-one hits of 2021 (Germany) =

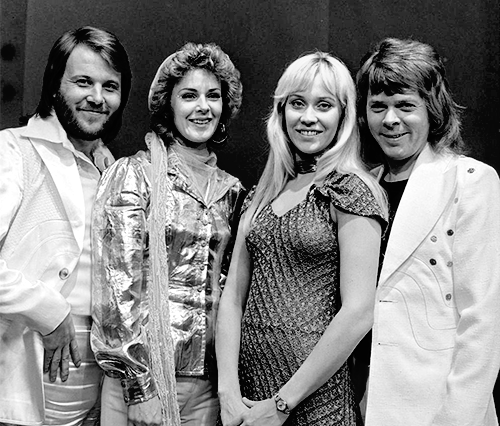
Nathan Evans' "Wellerman" became the best-performing single of 2021, while ABBA's (pictured) "Voyage" became the best-performing album of the year.

The GfK Entertainment charts are record charts compiled by GfK Entertainment on behalf of the German record industry. They include the "Single Top 100" and the "Album Top 100" chart. The chart week runs from Friday to Thursday, and the chart compilations are published on Tuesday for the record industry. The entire top 100 singles and top 100 albums are officially released the following Friday by GfK Entertainment. The charts are based on sales of physical singles and albums from retail outlets as well as permanent music downloads.

== Number-one hits by week ==
Key
†	Indicates best-performing single and album of 2021

Issue date	Song	Artist	Ref.	Album	Artist	Ref.
1 January	"All I Want for Christmas Is You"	Mariah Carey		Die Helene Fischer Show - Meine schönsten Momente Vol. 1	Helene Fischer	
8 January	"Angst"	Apache 207		Power Up	AC/DC	
15 January	"Highway"	Katja Krasavice featuring Elif		Splitter aus Glück	Daniela Alfinito	
22 January	"Ohne dich"	Kasimir1441 featuring Badmómzjay and Wildbwoys		Inhale/Exhale	LX	
29 January	"Ohne dich"	Kasimir1441 featuring Badmómzjay and Wildbwoys		Natural Born Killas	Asche and Kollegah	
5 February	"Ohne dich"	Kasimir1441 featuring Badmómzjay and Wildbwoys		Eure Mami	Katja Krasavice	
12 February	"Ohne dich"	Kasimir1441 featuring Badmómzjay and Wildbwoys		Medicine at Midnight	Foo Fighters	
19 February	"Wellerman" †	Nathan Evans		Summer in Berlin	Schiller	
26 February	"Madonna"	Bausa featuring Apache 207		Aghori	Kool Savas	
5 March	"Wellerman" †	Nathan Evans		Detroit Stories	Alice Cooper	
12 March	"Wellerman" †	Nathan Evans		Manifest	King Orgasmus One	
19 March	"Wellerman" †	Nathan Evans		Liebe macht Monster	Eisbrecher	
26 March	"Wellerman" †	Nathan Evans		Hello!	Maite Kelly	
2 April	"Wellerman" †	Nathan Evans		Widder	Fler	
9 April	"Wellerman" †	Nathan Evans		Naosu	Sierra Kidd	
16 April	"Wellerman" †	Nathan Evans		Ciao!	Giovanni Zarrella	
23 April	"Wellerman" †	Nathan Evans		Jetzt erst recht!	Ben Zucker	
30 April	"Best Friend (Remix)"	Saweetie featuring Doja Cat and Katja Krasavice		Puro Amor	Broilers	
7 May	"Wellerman" †	Nathan Evans		Stay High	Ufo361	
14 May	"Extasy"	Bonez MC featuring Frauenarzt		Vielleicht irgendwann	Wincent Weiss	
21 May	"Ich darf das"	Shirin David		Sampler 5	187 Strassenbande	
28 May	"Ich darf das"	Shirin David		Aus dem Licht in den Schatten zurück	Kontra K	
4 June	"Rosenkrieg"	Loredana and Mozzik		Rap über Hass	K.I.Z	
11 June	"Good 4 U"	Olivia Rodrigo		20	No Angels	
18 June	"Good 4 U"	Olivia Rodrigo		Neue Welt	Azet	
25 June	"Beggin'"	Måneskin		Helloween	Helloween	
2 July	"Sommergewitter"	Pashanim		HeimatLiebe	Kastelruther Spatzen	
9 July	"Lieben wir"	Shirin David		Das ist alles von der Kunstfreiheit gedeckt	Danger Dan	
16 July	"Bad Habits"	Ed Sheeran		Freiheit	Die Amigos	
23 July	"Bad Habits"	Ed Sheeran		Zukunft	RAF Camora	
30 July	"Blaues Licht"	RAF Camora featuring Bonez MC		Asozialer Marokkaner	Farid Bang	
6 August	"Bad Habits"	Ed Sheeran		Happier Than Ever	Billie Eilish	
13 August	"Bad Habits"	Ed Sheeran		Trip	Cro	
20 August	"Auf & ab"	Montez		MDNA	Genetikk	
27 August	"Enter Sandman"	Metallica		Complex Happenings Reduced to a Simple Design	Leoniden	
3 September	"Stay"	The Kid Laroi and Justin Bieber		Alles was du brauchst	Beatrice Egli	
10 September	"Mandarinen"	Shindy		Senjutsu	Iron Maiden	
17 September	"2CB"	RAF Camora featuring Luciano		Metallica	Metallica	
24 September	"Pussy Power"	Katja Krasavice		So weit	Peter Maffay	
1 October	"Stay"	The Kid Laroi and Justin Bieber		Dunkel	Die Ärzte	
8 October	"Kapitel II Vodka"	Apache 207		Zukunft	RAF Camora	
15 October	"Shivers"	Ed Sheeran		Wenn die Kälte kommt	Santiano	
22 October	"Easy on Me"	Adele		Rausch	Helene Fischer	
29 October	"Shivers"	Ed Sheeran		Rausch	Helene Fischer	
5 November	"Be A Hoe/Break A Hoe"	Shirin David and Kitty Kat		=	Ed Sheeran	
12 November	"Raindrops"	Katja Krasavice and Leony		Voyage †	ABBA	
19 November	"Der letzte Song (Alles wird gut)"	Kummer featuring Fred Rabe		Voyage †	ABBA	
26 November	"Easy on Me"	Adele		30	Adele	
3 December	"All I Want for Christmas Is You"	Mariah Carey		Voyage †	ABBA	
10 December	"All I Want for Christmas Is You"	Mariah Carey		Servant of the Mind	Volbeat	
17 December	"All I Want for Christmas Is You"	Mariah Carey		20 Jahre – Wir schaffen Deutsch.Land	Frei.Wild	
24 December	"Last Christmas"	Wham!		Nur	Fynn Kliemann	
31 December	"Last Christmas"	Wham!		Kontrollierte Anarchie	Philipp Burger	
