= Shots Fired =

Shots Fired may refer to:

- Shots Fired (TV series), 10-part TV series 2017
- "Shots Fired", a song by American rapper Megan Thee Stallion, from her album Good News (2020)
- Shots Fired, album by MojoJojo 2015

== See also ==
- Shotz Fired
- Shot (pellet)
