= Zenit (album) =

Studio album by RAF Camora
- Released: November 1, 2019
- Genre: Austrian hip hop, afro trap, dancehall, trap
- Length: 52:00
- Label: Indipendenza; Groove Attack

RAF Camora chronology
Palmen aus Plastik 2 (2018)	Zenit (2019)	Zukunft (2021)

Zenit (German for: Zenith) is the sixth studio album by Austrian rapper RAF Camora, released on 1 November 2019, through Indipendenza and distributed through Groove Attack.

== Background ==
Following the release of his fifth studio album Anthrazit and the subsequent re-release Anthrazit RR in 2017, the rapper announced the end of his career, after the release of Palmen aus Plastik 2 and one last solo album. In December 2018, he revealed that his last album will be titled Zenit. Shaho Casado's trailer with the release date for the album as November 1, 2019, was uploaded on August 23, 2019.

== Track listing ==
Adapted from Apple Music.

No.	Title	Length
1.	"Zenit"	2:02
2.	"Kreiert"	2:43
3.	"Vendetta"	2:35
4.	"Adriana"	2:45
5.	"Verändert" (with Bonez MC)	3:15
6.	"Resumee Worte"	1:15
7.	"Traum"	3:07
8.	"Puta Madre" (featuring Ghetto Phénomène) (long version)	4:26
9.	"Nichts als Nichts"	3:49
10.	"Resumee Risiko"	1:26
11.	"Cinema" (with Gallo Nero)	3:42
12.	"Meteorit"	3:48
13.	"Unnormal" (with Bonez MC)	3:19
14.	"Finale 1150"	2:55
15.	"Resumee Rabe"	2:08
16.	"Sag ihnen 2"	3:04
17.	"Vendetta RR" (bonus track)	2:33
18.	"Puta Madre" (bonus track)	3:29

== Charts ==
=== Weekly charts ===
Chart (2019)	Peak position
Austrian Albums (Ö3 Austria)	1
German Albums (Offizielle Top 100)	1
Swiss Albums (Schweizer Hitparade)	1

=== Year-end charts ===
Chart (2019)	Position
Austrian Albums (Ö3 Austria)	7
Swiss Albums (Schweizer Hitparade)	27
Chart (2020)	Position
Austrian Albums (Ö3 Austria)	3
Swiss Albums (Schweizer Hitparade)	39

== Certifications ==
Region	Certification	Certified units/sales
Austria (IFPI Austria)	Platinum	15,000^{‡}
Germany (BVMI)	Gold	100,000^{‡}
^{‡} Sales+streaming figures based on certification alone.
