= Palmen aus Plastik 2 =

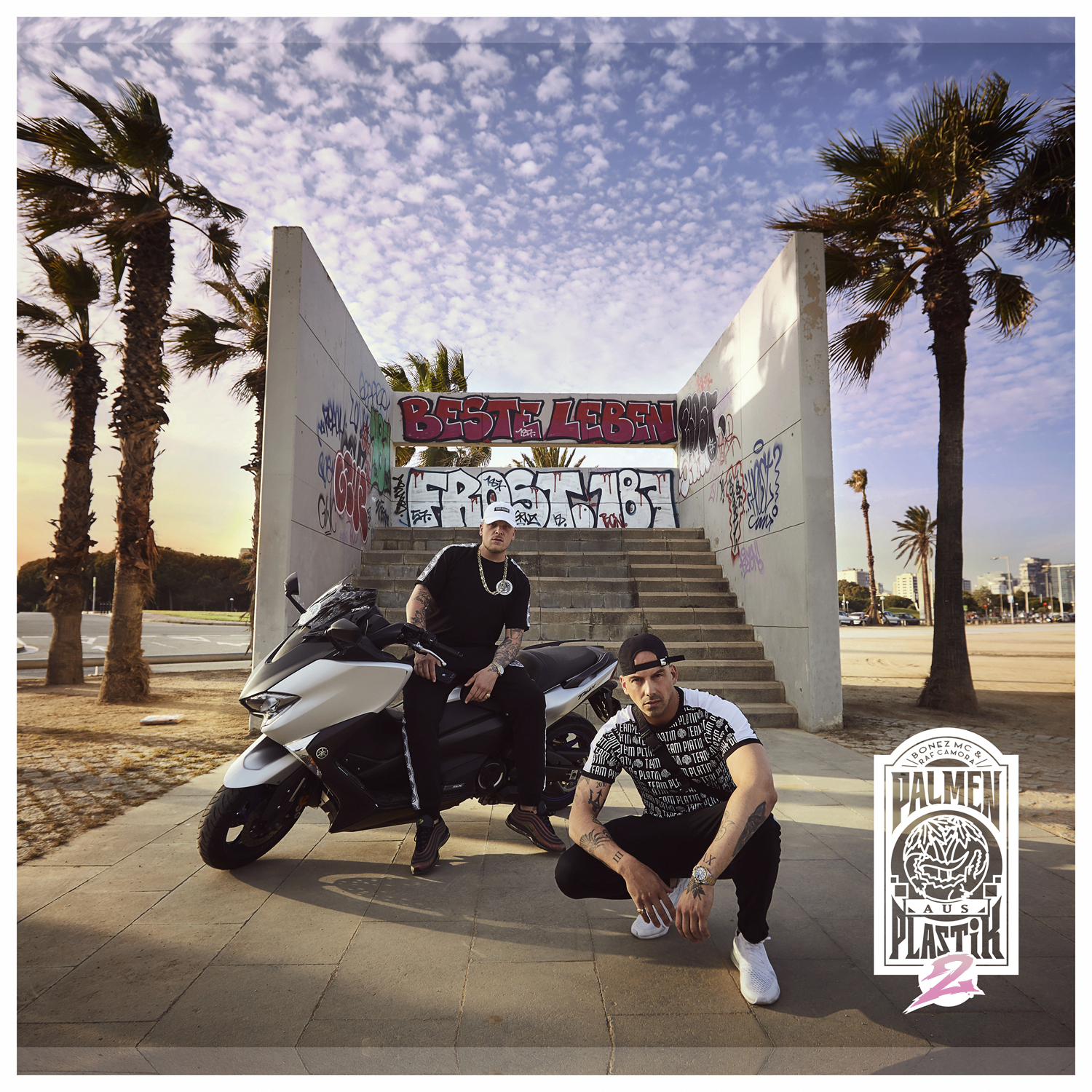

Studio album by Bonez MC and RAF Camora
- Released: 5 October 2018
- Recorded: 2018
- Length: 45:54
- Label: Vertigo; Capitol; Universal

Bonez MC chronology
Sampler 4 (2017)	Palmen aus Plastik 2 (2018)	Vulcano EP (2018)

RAF Camora chronology
Anthrazit RR (2017)	Palmen aus Plastik 2 (2018)	Vulcano EP (2018)

Singles from Palmen aus Plastik 2
- 1. "500 PS" Released: 3 August 2018; 2. "Risiko" Released: 24 August 2018; 3. "Kokain" Released: 14 September 2018

Alternate album cover

Palmen aus Plastik 2 (German: Palms out of plastic 2; abbreviated as PaP 2) is the second collaborative studio album by German rapper Bonez MC and Austrian rapper RAF Camora, released on 5 October 2018 through Vertigo Berlin and Capitol. It was also made available as a limited edition box set on the same date. Prior to the album, the rappers collaborated on Palmen aus Plastik (2016). Palmen aus Plastik 2 debuted at number one on the German, Swiss and Austrian album charts. The album was certified Gold by Bundesverband Musikindustrie (BVMI) and IFPI Austria. As of November 2018, the record was certified for 107,500 album-equivalent units in German-speaking Europe.

The album produced three singles: "500 PS", "Risiko" and "Kokain", all of which received music videos. Bonez MC and RAF Camora embarked on the Palmen aus Plastik 2 Tour in support of the album in February and March 2019.

== Background ==
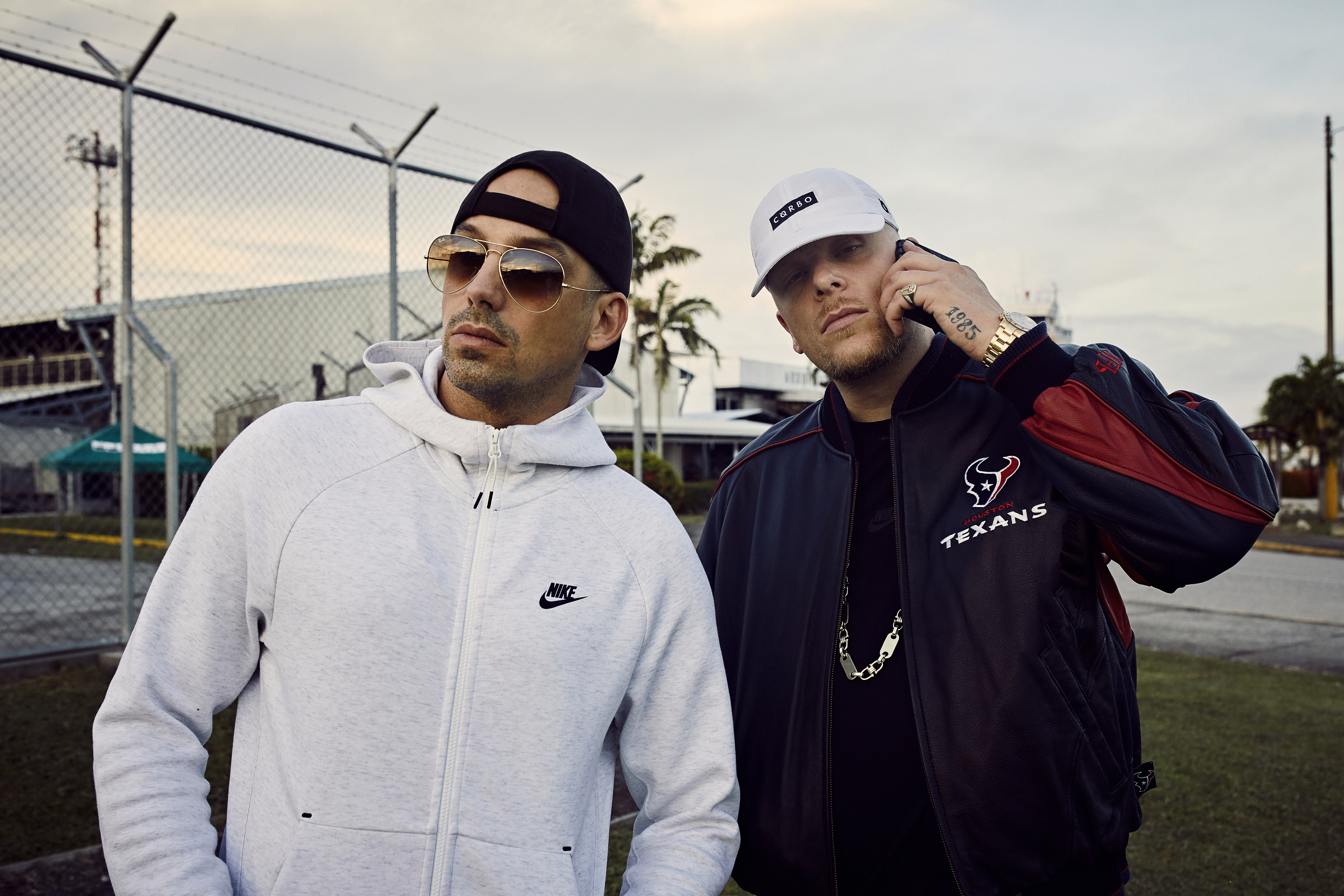
Bonez MC and RAF Camora in August 2017

Bonez MC and RAF Camora released their first joint project Palmen aus Plastik in September 2016, which became an immediate success for both of them. The album debuted atop the charts in German-speaking Europe and was certified platinum by the Bundesverband Musikindustrie (BVMI) and IFPI Austria. Following the release of the album, both toured extensively through Austria, Germany and Switzerland. Bonez MC and RAF Camora released projects in summer 2017, again to great commercial success. Bonez MC first confirmed Palmen aus Plastik 2 in January 2017 on Facebook. RAF Camora said in August 2017 that the album would be released in 2018. Bonez MC confirmed in April 2018 that Palmen aus Plastik 2 would be released in late summer 2018. The first snippet was published in late July, while the track listing was published in late August 2018. Part two of the snippet was release four days prior to the album's release.

== Singles ==
The first single "500 PS" was released on 3 August 2018 for digital download and streaming. The single debuted in the top 5 in German-speaking Europe. Three weeks later, "Risiko" was released and entered the charts at number two in all three countries. The last single, "Kokain", became their first single to reach the pole position of the German and Austrian singles charts. After the album release "500 PS" also reached number one in Germany.

== Commercial performance ==
Palmen aus Plastik 2 debuted at number one on the German albums chart on 12 October 2018. The album broke multiple chart records upon its release, including the most successful start of the year, the first artists to occupy the first three single chart positions and the first to debut with eight different songs in the top 10. Thirteen songs reached the top 20. The album was streamed over 57 million times in German-speaking Europe during its release week.

== Critical reception ==
Palmen aus Plastik received positive reviews from music critics. Mathis Raabe, a writer for Juice.de, gave the album 4.5 stars out of 5.

== Track listing ==
Credits adapted from Spotify.

No.	Title	Lyrics	Music	Length
1.	"Intro"	Raphael Ragucci; John Lorenz Moser	RAF Camora; The Cratez	0:33
2.	"Prominent"	Ragucci; Moser	RAF Camora; The Cratez	2:39
3.	"500 PS"	Ragucci; Moser	RAF Camora; The Cratez	3:02
4.	"Kokain" (featuring Gzuz)	Ragucci; Moser; Kristoffer Jonas Klauß	RAF Camora; The Cratez	3:29
5.	"Nummer unterdrückt"	Ragucci; Moser	RAF Camora; The Cratez; Jugglerz	3:29
6.	"Von ihnen gelernt"	Ragucci; Moser	Beataura; The Cratez	3:52
7.	"Ja Mann!"	Ragucci; Moser	The Cratez	3:08
8.	"Kompanie" (featuring Hanybal)	Ragucci; Moser; Sascha-Ramy Nour	The Cratez	2:39
9.	"Nein"	Ragucci; Moser	Syrix	3:15
10.	"Risiko"	Ragucci; Moser	RAF Camora; The Cratez; X-Plosive	3:43
11.	"Krimineller" (featuring Kontra K)	Ragucci; Moser; Maximilian Diehn	The Cratez; Beataura	3:08
12.	"Prophezeit"	Ragucci; Moser	The Cratez; Beataura	2:42
13.	"MDMA"	Ragucci; Moser	The Cratez; Jugglerz; Jr Blender	3:06
14.	"Alien"	Ragucci; Moser	RAF Camora; The Cratez; Gee Futuristic	3:34
15.	"100" (featuring Trettmann & KitschKrieg)	Ragucci; Moser; Stefan Richter	KitschKrieg	3:39
Total length:				45:54

== Charts ==
=== Weekly charts ===
Chart (2018)	Peak position
Austrian Albums (Ö3 Austria)	1
German Albums (Offizielle Top 100)	1
German Albums (Top 20 Hip Hop)	1
Swiss Albums (Schweizer Hitparade)	1
Belgian Albums (Ultratop Wallonia)	150

=== Year-end charts ===
Chart (2018)	Position
Austrian Albums (Ö3 Austria)	5
German Albums (Offizielle Top 100)	2
Swiss Albums (Schweizer Hitparade)	21

Chart (2019)	Position
Austrian Albums (Ö3 Austria)	10
Swiss Albums (Schweizer Hitparade)	46

Chart (2020)	Position
Austrian Albums (Ö3 Austria)	22

== Certifications ==
Region	Certification	Certified units/sales
Austria (IFPI Austria)	Gold	7,500^{‡}
Germany (BVMI)	Gold	100,000^{‡}
^{‡} Sales+streaming figures based on certification alone.

== Release history ==
Region	Date	Format	Label	Ref.
Various	5 October 2018	Digital download; streaming	Vertigo Berlin; Capitol	
Germany; Austria; Switzerland	5 October 2018	CD; limited box set	Vertigo Berlin; Capitol	
