= Ohne mein Team =

Single by Bonez MC & RAF Camora feat. Maxwell

from the album Palmen aus Plastik
- Released: 6 September 2016
- Recorded: 2016
- Genre: Afro-Trap
- Length: 3:08
- Label: Auf!Keinen!Fall!; Indipendenza
- Lyricist(s): John Lorenz Moser; Raphael Ragucci
- Producer(s): Raphael Ragucci

Bonez MC & RAF Camora singles chronology
"Mörder" (2016)	"Ohne mein Team" (2016)	"Palmen aus Gold" (2016)

"Ohne mein Team" is a song recorded by German rapper Bonez MC and Austrian rapper RAF Camora, featuring Maxwell for their first collaborative studio album Palmen aus Plastik (2016). It was released for digital download and streaming on 6 September 2016, through Auf!Keinen!Fall! and Indipendenza. The track acts as the records fourth and last single and was written by Bonez MC and RAF Camora and produced by latter.

The single reached the Top-10 in Germany and received minor commercial success in Austria and Switzerland.

== Background and composition ==
Bonez MC and RAF Camora announced Palmen aus Plastik in July 2016. They released three singles, including "Palmen aus Plastik", "Ruhe nach dem Sturm" and "Mörder". The last and final single of the album, "Ohne mein Team" was not announced and released on 6 September 2016, three days prior to the album's release. According to RAF Camora, the song was planned to include a feature with French rapper MHD.

== Commercial performance ==
"Ohne mein Team" debuted on number 44 of the German singlecharts on 9 September 2016. The following week, the single jumped to number seven, reaching its peak position. The single stayed six non-consecutive weeks in the Top-10 and left the charts after 88 non-consecutive weeks on 1 June 2018. The single became the first German language song to be streamed over 100 million times in March 2018 and has been certified 2-times platinum in by the BVMI.

== Charts ==
=== Weekly charts ===
Weekly chart performance for "Ohne mein Team"
Chart (2016–2023)	Peak position
Austria (Ö3 Austria Top 40)	34
Germany (GfK)	7
Switzerland (Schweizer Hitparade)	58

=== Year-end charts ===
Chart (2016)	Position
German Singles (Offizielle Top 100)	55
Chart (2017)	Position
German Singles (Offizielle Top 100)	17

=== Decade-end charts ===
Chart (2010–2019)	Position
Germany (Official German Charts)	17

== Certifications ==
Certifications for "Ohne mein Team"
Region	Certification	Certified units/sales
Austria (IFPI Austria)	Gold	15,000^{‡}
Germany (BVMI)	4× Platinum	1,600,000^{‡}
^{‡} Sales+streaming figures based on certification alone.
