= Palmen aus Plastik =

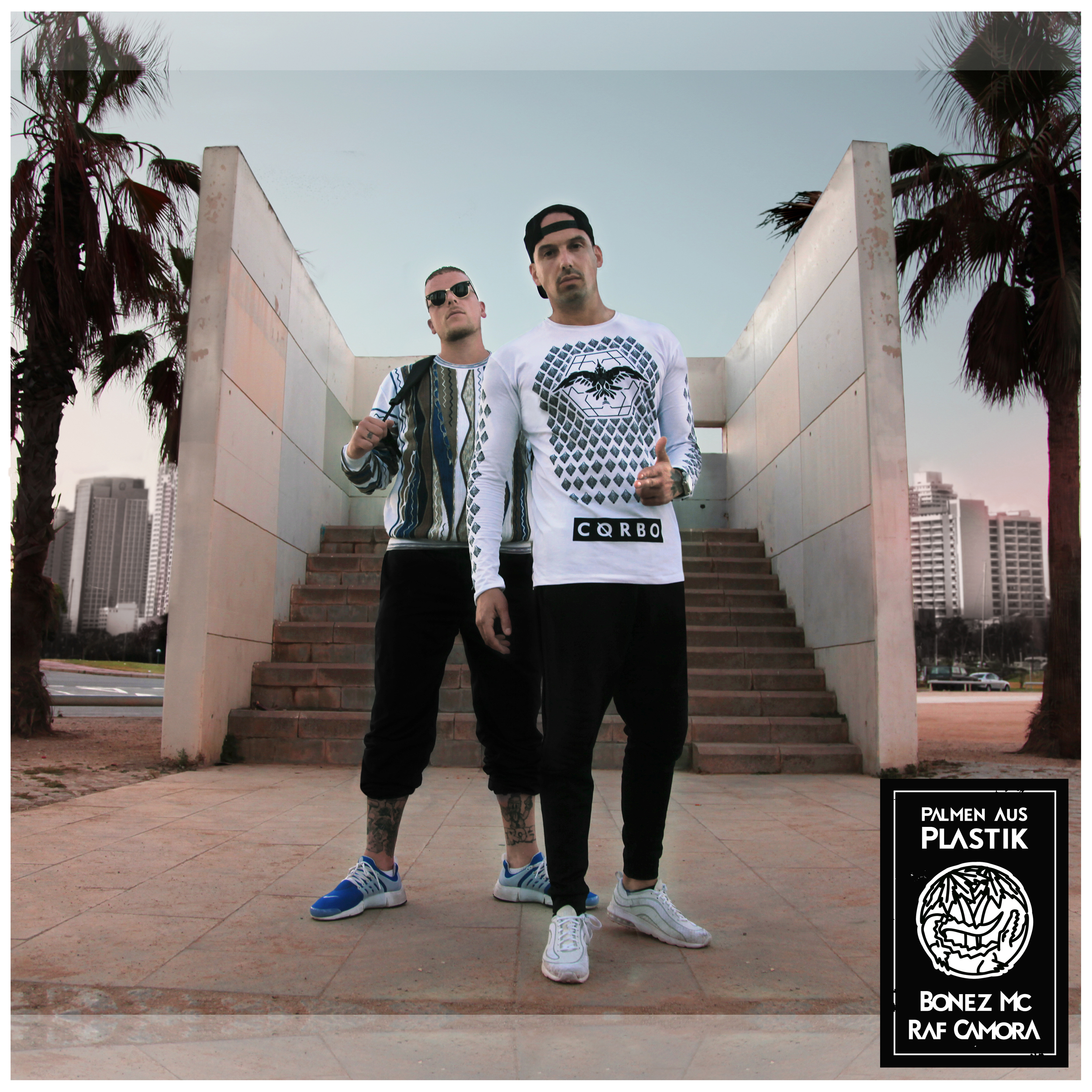

Studio album by Bonez MC and RAF Camora
- Released: September 9, 2016
- Recorded: 2016
- Genre: Hip hop; Dancehall; Reggae; Afro-Trap
- Length: 48:46; 1:08:28
- Label: Auf!Keinen!Fall!; Indipendenza
- Producer: Juh-Dee; Joznez; Johnny Illstrument; Gee Futuristic; Abaz; Reflectionz

Bonez MC chronology
High & Hungrig 2 (2016)	Palmen aus Plastik (2016)	Palmen aus Plastik 2 (2018)

RAF Camora chronology
Ghøst (2016)	Palmen aus Plastik (2016)	Anthrazit (2017)

Singles from Palmen aus Plastik
- 1. "Palmen aus Plastik" Released: July 15, 2016; 2. "Ruhe nach dem Sturm" Released: July 22, 2016; 3. "Mörder" Released: August 19, 2016; 4. "Ohne mein Team" Released: September 6, 2016

Tannen aus Plastik album cover

Singles from Tannen aus Plastik
- 1. "Palmen aus Gold" Released: November 24, 2016; 2. "An ihnen vorbei" Released: December 12, 2016

Palmen aus Plastik is the first collaborative studio album by German rapper Bonez MC and Austrian rapper RAF Camora, released on September 9, 2016, byAuf!Keinen!Fall! and Indipendenza. The follow-up, Palmen aus Plastik 2 was released on October 5, 2018.

== Background ==
Bonez MC and RAF Camora first worked together on RAF Camoras studio album Ghøst (2016). They announced the album live at the Splash! Festival, during the performance of the 187 Strassenbande. The album was officially confirmed on July 9, 2016, by Auf!Keinen!Fall!. Parts of the album, were created during a trip to Jamaica.

== Track listing ==
All lyrics are written by Bonez MC and RAF Camora.

Palmen aus Plastik
No.	Title	Music	Length
1.	"Intro"		0:38
2.	"Ciao Ciao"	RAF Canora	2:33
3.	"Palmen aus Plastik"	RAF Camora; Beataura	3:04
4.	"Mörder" (featuring Gzuz)	RAF Camora; Beataura	3:34
5.	"Ohne mein Team" (featuring Maxwell)	RAF Camora	3:08
6.	"Erblindet"	Beataura	3:10
7.	"Evil" (featuring Tommy Lee Sparta)	RAF Camora	5:42
8.	"Attackieren" (featuring Hanybal)	X-plosive	4:02
9.	"Killa" (featuring D-Flame)	Suigeneris	2:36
10.	"Ruhe nach dem Sturm"	RAF Camora	3:14
11.	"Vaporizer" (featuring Trettmann)	Beataura	3:52
12.	"Dankbarkeit"	Irievibrations	3:29
13.	"Skimaske" (featuring Gzuz)	RAF Camora; Jambeatz	2:27
14.	"Cabriolet"	X-Plosive	3:33
15.	"Daneben" (featuring Trettmann)	KitschKrieg	3:44
Total length:			48:46

== Charts ==
=== Weekly charts ===
Chart (2016)	Peak position
Austrian Albums (Ö3 Austria)	2
German Albums (Offizielle Top 100)	1
Swiss Albums (Schweizer Hitparade)	1

=== Year-end charts ===
Chart (2016)	Position
Austrian Albums (Ö3 Austria)	67
German Albums (Offizielle Top 100)	12
Swiss Albums (Schweizer Hitparade)	76

Chart (2018)	Position
German Albums (Offizielle Top 100)	80

== Certifications ==
Region	Certification	Certified units/sales
Austria (IFPI Austria)	Platinum	15,000^{*}
Germany (BVMI)	Platinum	200,000^{‡}
^{*} Sales figures based on certification alone.^{‡} Sales+streaming figures based on certification alone.
