= Anthrazit =

Studio album by RAF Camora
- Released: 25 August 2017
- Recorded: 2017
- Length: 0:59:34
- Label: Indipendenza
- Producer: RAF Camora; X-Plosive; The Cratez

RAF Camora chronology
Tannen aus Plastik (2016)	Anthrazit (2017)	Schwarze Materie II (2017)

Singles from Anthrazit
- 1. "Kontrollieren" Released: 26 April 2017; 2. "In meiner Wolke" Released: 14 July 2017; 3. "Alles probiert" Released: 21 July 2017; 4. "Bye, Bye" Released: 4 August 2017; 5. "Andere Liga" Released: 18 August 2017; 6. "Primo" Released: 24 August 2017

Anthrazit RR

Singles from Anthrazit RR
- 1. "Turbo" Released: 23 November 2017; 2. "Verkauft" Released: 29 November 2017; 3. "Sag nix" Released: 7 December 2017; 4. "Gotham City" Released: 13 December 2017

Anthrazit is the fifth studio album by Austrian musician RAF Camora. Released on 25 August 2017, by RAF Camoras own label Indipendenza, the album debuted at number one on the German, Swiss and Austrian album charts. Anthrazit is certified Gold by IFPI Austria and Platinum by Bundesverband Musikindustrie (BVMI). The album produced six singles, including "Kontrollieren", "In meiner Wolke", "Alles probiert", "Bye, Bye", "Andere Liga" and "Primo". All of the singles reached the charts in German-speaking Europe, which exception of "Bye, Bye", which didn't enter the Swiss charts.

== Background ==
Following the release of his fourth studio album Ghøst (2016), RAF Camora released his fourth collobarative studio album, Palmen aus Plastik (2016), alongside German rapper Bonez MC. RAF Camora announced in April 2017 his fifth studio album, Anthrazit, without giving a specific release date. RAF Camora also announced, his fifth extended play, Schwarze Materie II, which was exclusively distributed through the box set of Anthrazit.

== Track listing ==
Credits adapted from Tidal.

Anthrazit
No.	Title	Lyrics	Music	Length
1.	"Anthrazit"	RAF Camora	RAF Camora	2:12
2.	"Vienna"	RAF Camora	RAF Camora	3:04
3.	"Alles probiert" (featuring Bonez MC)	RAF Camora; Bonez MC	RAF Camora	4:39
4.	"Bye, Bye"	RAF Camora	RAF Camora	3:43
5.	"Primo"	RAF Camora	RAF Camora	3:23
6.	"Roots" (featuring Gentleman)	RAF Camora; Gentleman	RAF Camora	4:03
7.	"Donna Imma"	RAF Camora	RAF Camora	3:16
8.	"Niemals" (featuring Kontra K)	RAF Camora; Kontra K	RAF Camora	3:21
9.	"Andere Liga"	RAF Camora	RAF Camora	3:42
10.	"Luft"	RAF Camora	RAF Camora	2:49
11.	"Money" (featuring Ufo361)	RAF Camora; Ufo361	RAF Camora	4:08
12.	"Teflon"	RAF Camora	RAF Camora	3:34
13.	"Augenblick" (featuring Bonez MC)	RAF Camora; Bonez MC	RAF Camora	3:35
14.	"Entertainment" (featuring KC Rebell)	RAF Camora; KC Rebell	RAF Camora	3:29
15.	"Was jetzt"	RAF Camora	RAF Camora	3:56
16.	"In meiner Wolke"	RAF Camora	RAF Camora	3:18
17.	"Kontrollieren" (featuring Bonez MC, Gzuz & Maxwell)	RAF Camora; Bonez MC; Gzuz; Maxwell	RAF Camora	3:21
Total length:				59:34

== Charts ==
=== Weekly charts ===
Chart (2017)	Peak position
Austrian Albums (Ö3 Austria)	1
German Albums (Offizielle Top 100)	1
German Albums (Top 20 Hip Hop)	1
Swiss Albums (Schweizer Hitparade)	5

=== Year-end charts ===
Chart (2017)	Position
Austrian Albums (Ö3 Austria)	20
German Albums (Offizielle Top 100)	37

Chart (2018)	Position
Austrian Albums (Ö3 Austria)	18
German Albums (Offizielle Top 100)	30

Chart (2019)	Position
Austrian Albums (Ö3 Austria)	42

== Certifications ==
Region	Certification	Certified units/sales
Austria (IFPI Austria)	Gold	7,500^{‡}
Germany (BVMI)	Platinum	200,000^{‡}
^{‡} Sales+streaming figures based on certification alone.

== Release history ==
Edition	Date	Region	Format	Label
Anthrazit	August 25, 2017	Various	Digital download; streaming	Indipendenza; BMG
Anthrazit	August 25, 2017	Germany; Austria; Switzerland	CD; Limited Boxset	Indipendenza; BMG
Anthrazit RR	December 15, 2017	Various	streaming audio	Indipendenza; BMG
