= Trettmann =

German rapper (born 1973)

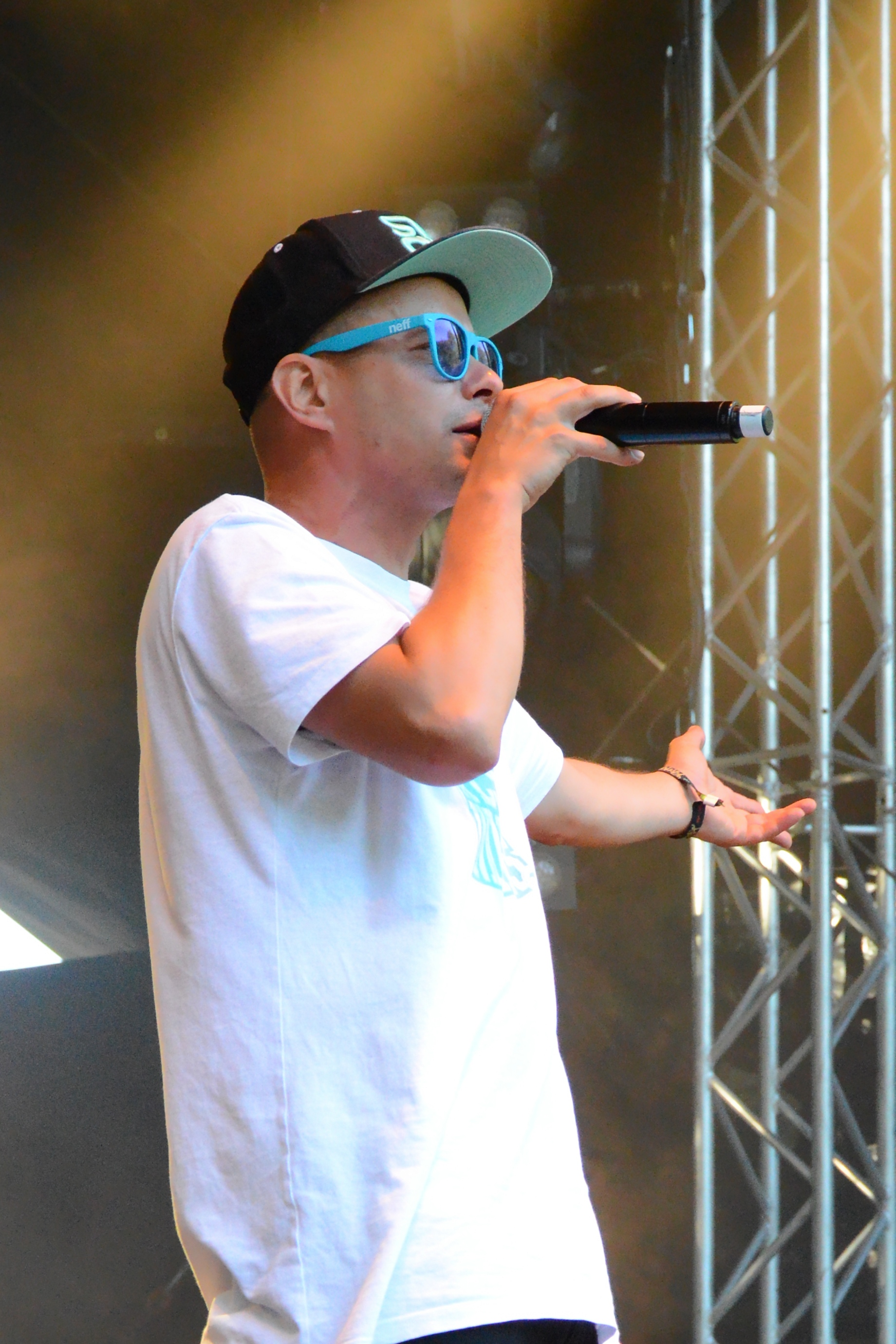
- Trettmann (2013)

Background information
- Born: Stefan Richter; 9 October 1973 (age 52); Karl-Marx-Stadt, East Germany
- Genres: German hip hop, Trap
- Occupation: Rapper
- Website: trettmann.de

Stefan Richter, better known by the stage name Trettmann, is a German rapper. Since his breakthrough in 2016, he works with the producer collective KitschKrieg.

== Biography ==
Richter grew up in East Germany prior to the fall of the wall. His hometown Karl-Marx-Stadt is today called Chemnitz. His mother raised him and his older brother as a single parent. The family made their home in a large Plattenbau development named after Fritz Heckert. Richter later used the name "Heckert" in his production company. The area also served as a backdrop to the music video of his single "Grauer Beton" (grey concrete) in 2017. Richter cites RnB acts as his earliest musical influences, which he learned to appreciate when listening to the records of his mother and to radio stations from West Germany.

Richter gained his first impressions of hip-hop during an appearance of the New York City Breakers on West German TV in 1984. He also cited the film Beat Street as an early visual influence, which premiered in East German cinemas during 1985. Richter started breakdancing and joined various crews of his hometown. From 1984 on, he attended a middle school with a special track for music, dancing and performance. Richter graduated from high school in Chemnitz after the end of Communism in East Germany.

In the early 1990s, Richter travelled to Jamaica for the first time. Jamaican music continued to influence his style. In the following years he worked in various temp jobs, including a gig as a clerk in a record shop. He also started DJing. He lived in Berlin for a while, but then moved to Leipzig in 2001, where he organized reggae parties and performed as an MC. His debut single under the moniker Ronny Trettman appeared in 2006, staying four weeks in the German single charts. He performed his songs in an Upper Saxon dialect, satirising the German reggae/dancehall scene. In 2010, he released his first studio album, dropping the Saxon dialect and comedy act. He followed up with a second album in 2013.

From 2016 on, he removed the first name of his artist persona, performing simply as Trettmann from then on. He started his collaboration with KitschKrieg, releasing three EPs in rapid succession. Music critics described his style as "beats [...] in the manner of cloud rap". Trettmann gave guest appearances on the commercially successful album Palmen aus Plastik by RAF Camora and Bonez MC, thus becoming known to a wider audience in 2016. In 2017, Trettmann released his own album DIY#, which stayed on the German album charts 64 weeks, peaking at rank 17. In 2018, Trettmann performed on the single "Standard" together with German hip-hop acts Gringo, Ufo361 and Gzuz. "Standard" topped the German single charts for two weeks.

Trettmann lives in Leipzig, working with KitschKrieg in Berlin-Kreuzberg.

== Awards ==
- 2018 hiphop.de Awards: 1st rank in the category "Best Song National" (Standard)
- 2018 Preis für Popkultur: 1st rank in the categories "Favourite Solo Artist" (Trettmann), "Favourite Album" (#DIY), and "Favourite Track" (Grauer Beton)
- 2017 Juice Awards: 1st rank in the categories "Solo Artist National" and "Album National"
- 2017 hiphop.de Awards: 1st rank in the category "Best Album National" (#DIY)

== Discography ==
=== Albums ===
- 2010: Zwei chlorbleiche Halunken
- 2013: Tanz auf dem Vulkan
- 2017: #DIY
- 2019: Trettmann
- 2023: Insomnia

=== Collaborative singles and other charting hits ===
- 2018: Chaya, Nura featuring Trettmann
- 2018: Standard, KitschKrieg featuring Trettmann, Gringo, Ufo361 & Gzuz
- 2019: 5 Minuten, KitschKrieg featuring Cro, AnnenMayKantereit & Trettmann
- 2020: Irgendwo, KitschKrieg featuring Nena & Trettmann
