= 500 PS =

Single by Bonez MC and RAF Camora

from the album Palmen aus Plastik 2
- Released: 3 August 2018
- Recorded: 2018
- Genre: Dancehall
- Length: 3:01
- Label: Vertigo; Capitol; Universal
- Songwriters: John Lorenz Moser; Raphael Ragucci; David Kraft; Tim Wilke
- Producers: The Cratez; RAF Camora

Bonez MC singles chronology
"Glaub Mir" (2017)	"500 PS" (2018)	"Risiko" (2018)

RAF Camora singles chronology
"Maserati" (2018)	"500 PS" (2018)	"Risiko" (2018)

Music video
- "500 PS" on YouTube

"500 PS" is a song by German rapper Bonez MC and Austrian rapper RAF Camora. It was released on 3 August 2018, through Vertigo, Capitol and Universal. Written by Bonez MC, RAF Camora, The Cratez, and produced by the latter, the song serves as the first single of their second collaborative studio album Palmen aus Plastik 2.

== Background and composition ==
"500 PS" was written by Bonez MC, RAF Camora and The Cratez, while production was handled by Camora alongside The Cratez. The song has been described as a dancehall song, whose lyrics deal with fast cars and wealth.

== Commercial performance ==
"500 PS" debuted at number three in Germany on 10 August 2018. The song reached its peak atop the charts ten weeks into its chartrun, following the release of the album on 5 October 2018 and fell to number two the following week. It reached the top twenty of the year-end charts and was certified platinum by the Bundesverband Musikindustrie (BVMI) in 2019. In Austria, the single debuted at number three and peaked at number two in September 2018. It stayed in the top ten for 15 weeks and was certified platinum in December 2018.

== Charts ==
=== Weekly charts ===
Chart (2018)	Peak position
Austria (Ö3 Austria Top 40)	2
Germany (GfK)	1
Switzerland (Schweizer Hitparade)	4

=== Year-end charts ===
Chart (2018)	Position
Austria (Ö3 Austria Top 40)	6
Germany (Official German Charts)	16
Switzerland (Schweizer Hitparade)	54
Chart (2019)	Position
Austria (Ö3 Austria Top 40)	11
Germany (Official German Charts)	17

== Certifications ==
Region	Certification	Certified units/sales
Austria (IFPI Austria)	Platinum	30,000^{‡}
Germany (BVMI)	Diamond	1,000,000^{‡}
^{‡} Sales+streaming figures based on certification alone.
