= Gzuz =

German rapper and record producer (born 1988)

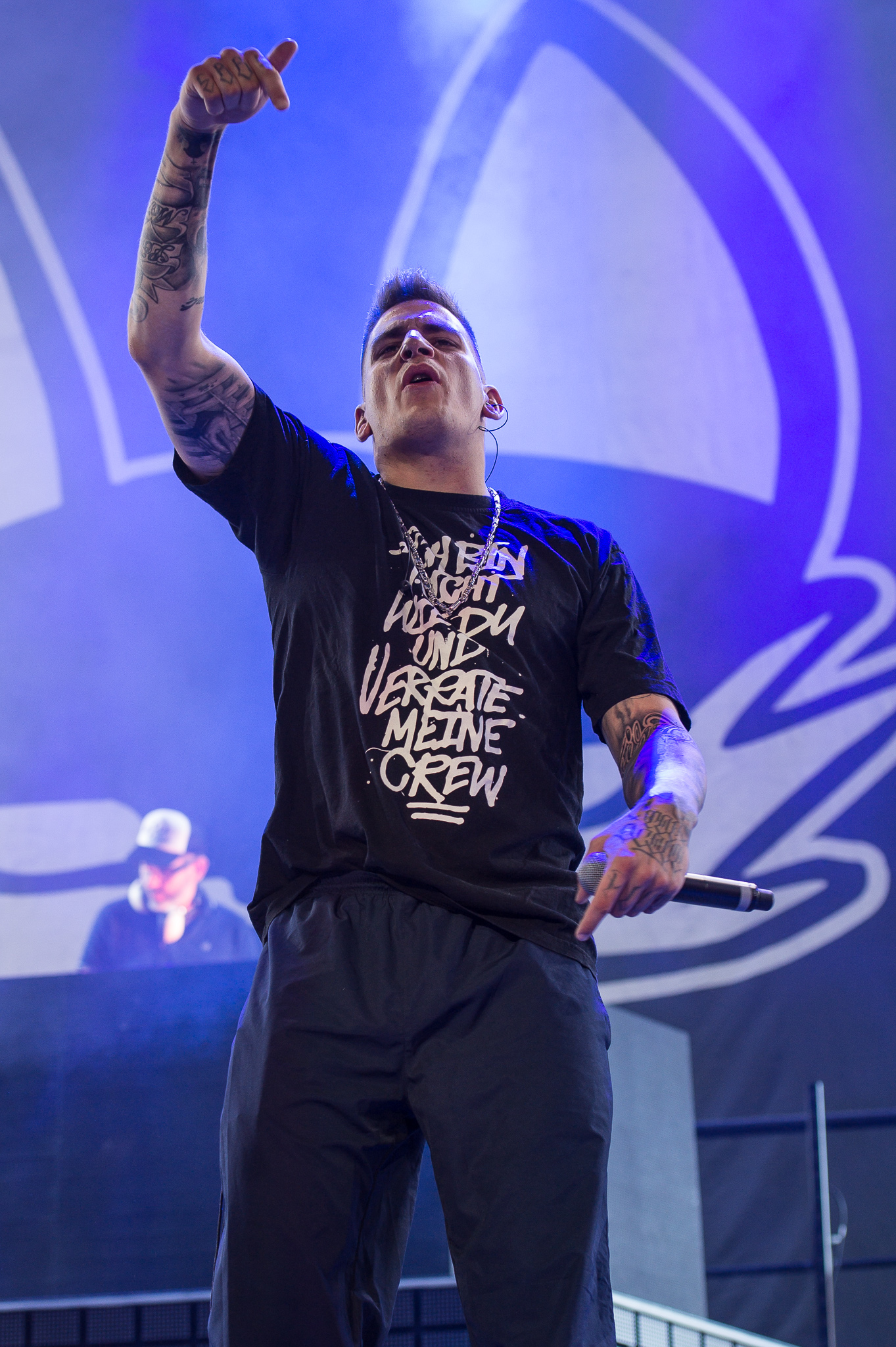
- Gzuz in 2017

Background information
- Born: June 29, 1988 (age 37); Hamburg, West Germany
- Genres: Hip hop
- Occupations: Rapper; songwriter; record producer
- Years active: 2007–present

Kristoffer Jonas Klauß (German pronunciation: [ˈkʁɪstɔfɐ ˈjoːnas ˈklaʊs]; born 29 June 1988), better known by the stage name Gzuz (/ˈdʒʌzəs/ JUZ-əs), is a German rapper and record producer. In addition to his solo career, he has had success as part of Hamburg hip hop crew 187 Strassenbande.

== Biography ==
After his parents' divorce, Klauß grew up with his sister and his mother in Hamburg while becoming increasingly fascinated by the people who earn their money in the streets. As a child, Klauß showed promise at basketball, yet the influence from bad company and later decisions led him to not advance seriously in the sport. His addiction to marijuana, hashish and speedball led him to be admitted to a rehabilitation center at the age of 14. At the age of 15, fed up with his destructive and criminal behavior, his mother decided to kick him out of the house. After resisting studying, he decided to try again with vocational training, but they ended up kicking him out for stealing a laptop. According to him, "he didn't fit into the German school system." Klauß has been a member of 187 Strassenbande since 2006. The name Gzuz is an acronym for "Ghetto-Zeug unzensiert" (Ghetto stuff uncensored).

In October 2010 he was sentenced to three years and six months in prison for predatory theft. During his detention, the 187 Street Gang went on a Free Gzuz Tour in 2012 and sold Gzuz Merchandise, such as Free Gzuz T-shirts.

After his release in 2013, he took part in the Uprising Tour. In 2014 he released the album High & hungrig together with Bonez MC, which entered the German album charts at number 9.

His solo album Ebbe & Flut was released on 9 October 2015. This made it to number 2 in the album charts in Germany. On 27 May 2016 he released the album High & hungrig 2 together with Bonez MC. It entered the album charts at number 1 and reached Gold status.

Gzuz gained attention in the U.S. after WorldStarHipHop posted the video for his song "Was Hast Du Gedacht". The music video went viral due to its extremely graphic and violent nature. Worldstar later posted the video for his song "Warum" as well.

== Awards ==
- HANS – Der Hamburger Musikpreis
  - 2016: in the category Song des Jahres for Ahnma with Beginner & Gentleman
- Preis für Popkultur
  - 2016: in the category Lieblingsvideo for Ahnma with Beginner & Gentleman
- Hiphop.de Awards / Juice-Awards
  - 2016: in the category Beste Punchline for "Cabrio: Check! Glas wird geext / Na klar gibt es Sex, weil ich parshippe jetzt!"

== Discography ==
=== Albums ===
with 187 Strassenbande
(for details, see discography of 187 Strassenbande)

- 2009: 187 Strassenbande
- 2011: Der Sampler II
- 2015: Der Sampler III
- 2017: Sampler 4
- 2021: Sampler 5

Solo

Year	Title	Chart		
Year	Title	GER	AUT	SWI
2014	High & hungrig (with Bonez MC)	9	28	36
2015	Ebbe & Flut	2	8	4
2016	High & hungrig 2 (with Bonez MC)	1	2	2
2018	Wolke 7	1	2	2
2020	Gzuz	1	1	2
2022	Große Freiheit	1	2	2
2024	Freitag der 13.	2	2	2
2025	Scherbenhaus	1	1	4

=== Collaborative singles and other charted songs ===
Year	Title	Chart			Album
Year	Title	GER	AUT	SWI	Album
2017	"Mit den Jungz" (Gzuz, Bonez MC & LX)	11	45	62	Sampler 4
2017	"Millionär" (Bonez MC, Gzuz)	2	29	32	Sampler 4
2017	"High Life" (Bonez MC, RAF Camora, Gzuz & Maxwell)	30	67	–	Sampler 4
