= RAF Camora =

Austrian rapper

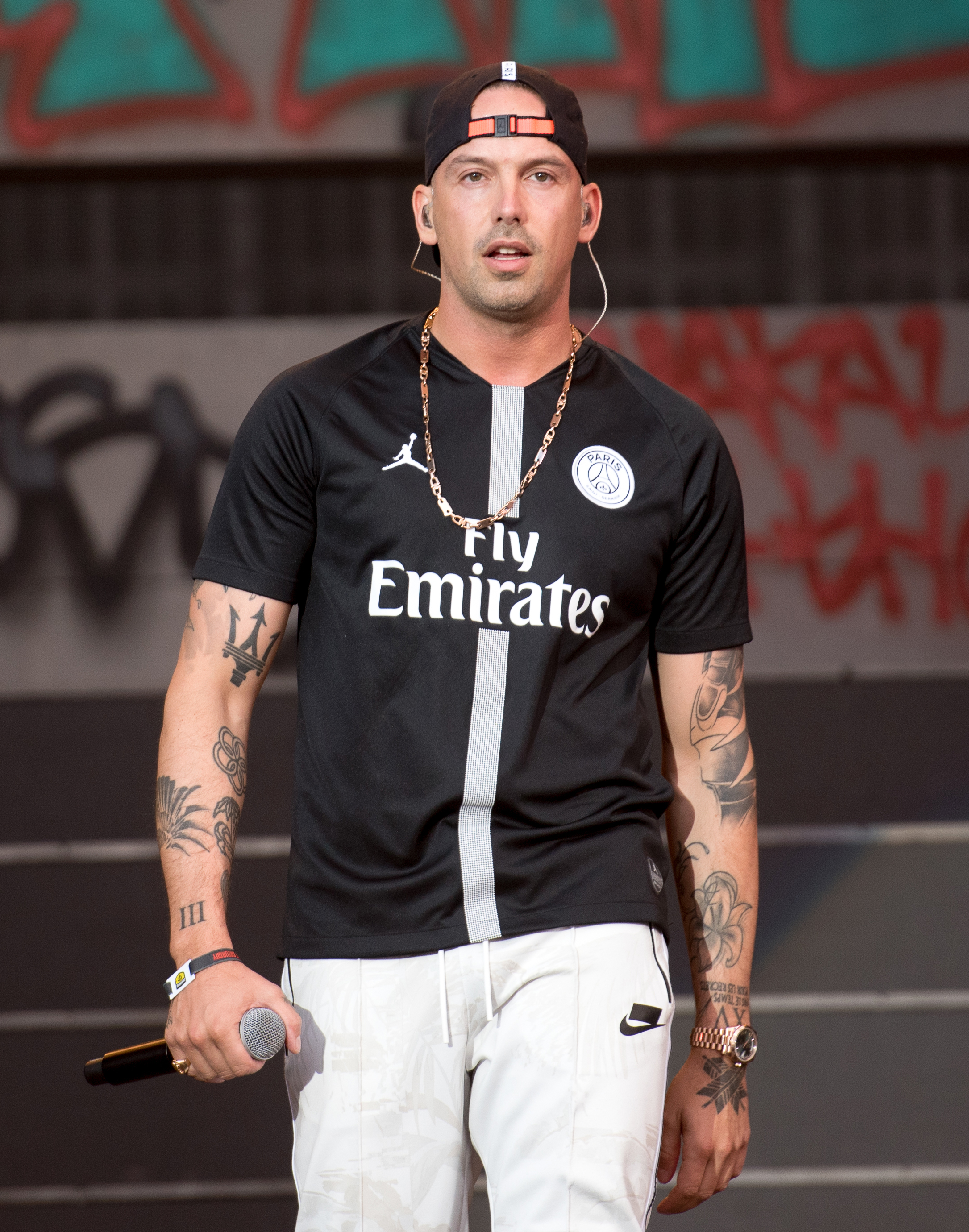
- RAF Camora in 2019

Background information
- Also known as: RAF 3.0, RafOMic
- Born: Raphael Ragucci; 4 June 1984 (age 42); Vevey, Switzerland
- Origin: Vienna, Austria
- Genres: Hip hop; dancehall
- Occupations: Rapper; singer; songwriter; producer
- Years active: 2002–present
- Labels: Indipendenza, Andere Liga

Raphael Ragucci (born 4 June 1984), known professionally as RAF Camora, is an Austrian rapper, singer and producer.

== Biography ==
Raphael Ragucci was born in Vevey, Switzerland, to an Austrian father from Vorarlberg and an Italian mother from Naples. Ragucci settled in Vienna, Austria in 1997 and grew up in Rudolfsheim-Fünfhaus.

Known initially as RAF Camora, he founded a hip hop crew with the Polish Rapatoi. At 17, he was in the French Connection crew and soon later in French-speaking Assaut Mystik. He founded with rapper Joshi Mizu the band Balkan Express. Family Bizz was a debut joint album with both Assaut Mystik and Balkan Express. In 2006, he released his EP Skandal with Emirez. In 2009 he released his studio album Nächster Stopp Zukunft as RAF Camora.

In January 2010, he took the stage name RAF 3.0 shelving his earlier name and signed with Vienna-based Irievibrations Records with whom he released the self-titled album RAF 3.0 in 2012 and Hoch 2 in 2013. Both were huge successes on the German, Austrian and Swiss charts.

Reverting to his original name RAF Camora, in 2013 he founded his own record label Indipendenza. His albums Ghøst in 2016 and Anthrazit in 2017 were big successes on German, Austrian and Swiss charts. Ragucci announced his fourth studio album Ghøst in January 2016. The album was released on 15 April 2016 and debuted in the top-20 of German speaking Europe.

Ragucci released a new album, Zenit on 1 November 2019. It has peaked at spot number one for two weeks on Ö3 Austria and Schweizer Hitparade, and for one week on Offizielle Top 100.

== Discography ==
- Nächster Stopp Zukunft (2009)
- RAF 3.0 (2012)
- Hoch 2 (2013)
- Ghøst (2016)
- Anthrazit (2017)
- Zenit (2019)
- Zukunft (2021)
- XV (2023)
- Forever (2025)

== Awards and nominations ==
=== Results ===
Year	Award	Nomination	Work	Result	Ref.
2011	HipHop.de Awards	Best Collaboration	Himself & Nazar	Nominated	
2013	HipHop.de Awards	Best Producer National	Himself	Won	
2013	Amadeus Austrian Music Awards	Hip-Hop / R'n'B	Himself	Nominated	
2014	Amadeus Austrian Music Awards	Hip-Hop / R'n'B	Himself	Won	
2014	Amadeus Austrian Music Awards	Album of the Year	Hoch 2	Nominated	
2014	Echo Awards	Hip-Hop / Urban International	Hoch 2	Nominated	
2015	Amadeus Austrian Music Awards	Hip-Hop / Urban	Himself & Chakuza, Joshi Mizu	Nominated	
2016	1LIVE Krone Awards	Best Hip-Hop Act	Himself & Bonez MC	Won	
2016	HipHop.de Awards	Best Producer National	Himself	Won	
2016	HipHop.de Awards	Best Group National	Himself & Bonez MC	Won	
2016	HipHop.de Awards	Best Release National	Palmen aus Plastik (with Bonez MC)	Won	
2016	HipHop.de Awards	Best Video National	Palmen aus Gold (with Bonez MC, Shaho Casado)	Won	
2016	HipHop.de Awards	Best Rap-Solo-Act National	Himself	Nominated	
2016	HipHop.de Awards	Best Song National	Palmen aus Plastik (with Bonez MC)	Nominated	
2016	Juice Awards	Best Album National	Palmen aus Plastik (with Bonez MC)	Won	
2016	Juice Awards	Song National	Ohne mein Team (with Bonez MC)	Nominated	
2017	1LIVE Krone Awards	Best Hip-Hop Act	Himself	Won	
2017	Amadeus Austrian Music Awards	Hip-Hop / Urban	Himself	Nominated	
2017	Echo Awards	Hip-Hop / Urban National	Palmen aus Plastik (with Bonez MC)	Nominated	
2017	HipHop.de Awards	Best Producer National	Himself	Nominated	
2017	HipHop.de Awards	Best Rap-Solo-Act National	Himself	Nominated	
2018	HipHop.de Awards	Best Video National	500 PS (with Bonez MC)	Nominated	
2018	HipHop.de Awards	Best Group National	Himself & Bonez MC	Won	
2018	HipHop.de Awards	Best Album National	Palmen aus Plastik 2 (with Bonez MC)	Nominated	
2018	Echo Awards	Hip-Hop / Urban National	Anthrazit	Nominated	
2018	Amadeus Austrian Music Awards	Hip-Hop / Urban	Himself	Won	
2018	Amadeus Austrian Music Awards	Album of the Year	Anthrazit	Nominated	
2018	Amadeus Austrian Music Awards	Song of the Year	Primo	Nominated	
2018	Amadeus Austrian Music Awards	FM4 Award	Himself	Shortlisted	
2019	Amadeus Austrian Music Awards	Song of the Year	500 PS (with Bonez MC)	Nominated	
2019	Amadeus Austrian Music Awards	Album of the Year	Palmen aus Plastik 2 (with Bonez MC)	Nominated	
2019	Amadeus Austrian Music Awards	Hip-Hop / Urban	Himself	Won	
2019	HipHop.de Awards	Lebenswerk	Himself	Won	
2019	HipHop.de Awards	Best Album National	Zenit	Nominated	
2019	HipHop.de Awards	Best Live-Act National	Himself & Bonez MC	Nominated	
2019	Hype Awards	Hype Live-Act	Himself & Bonez MC	Won	
2019	Hype Awards	Hype Song	500 PS (with Bonez MC)	Won	
2019	Hype Awards	Hype Collaboration	Himself & Bonez MC	Nominated	
2019	4GameChangers Awards	4Music	Himself	Won	
2019	Bravo Otto Awards	Hip-Hop National	Himself	Nominated	
2019	Swiss Music Awards	Best Group International	Himself & Bonez MC	Nominated	
2020	Amadeus Austrian Music Awards	Hip-Hop / Urban	Himself	Won	
2020	Amadeus Austrian Music Awards	Song of the Year	Puta Madre (feat. Ghetto Phénomène)	Nominated	
2020	Amadeus Austrian Music Awards	Album of the Year	Zenit	Nominated	
2021	Amadeus Austrian Music Awards	Song of the Year	Maschine (with The Cratez)	Nominated	
2021	Amadeus Austrian Music Awards	Hip-Hop / Urban	Himself	Nominated	
2021	Bravo Otto Awards	Hip-Hop National	Himself	Nominated	
2021	HipHop.de Awards	Creator of the Year	Himself	Won	
2023	Swiss Music Awards	Best Group International	Himself & Bonez MC	Nominated	
