= Bonez MC =

German rapper, singer, songwriter, and record producer

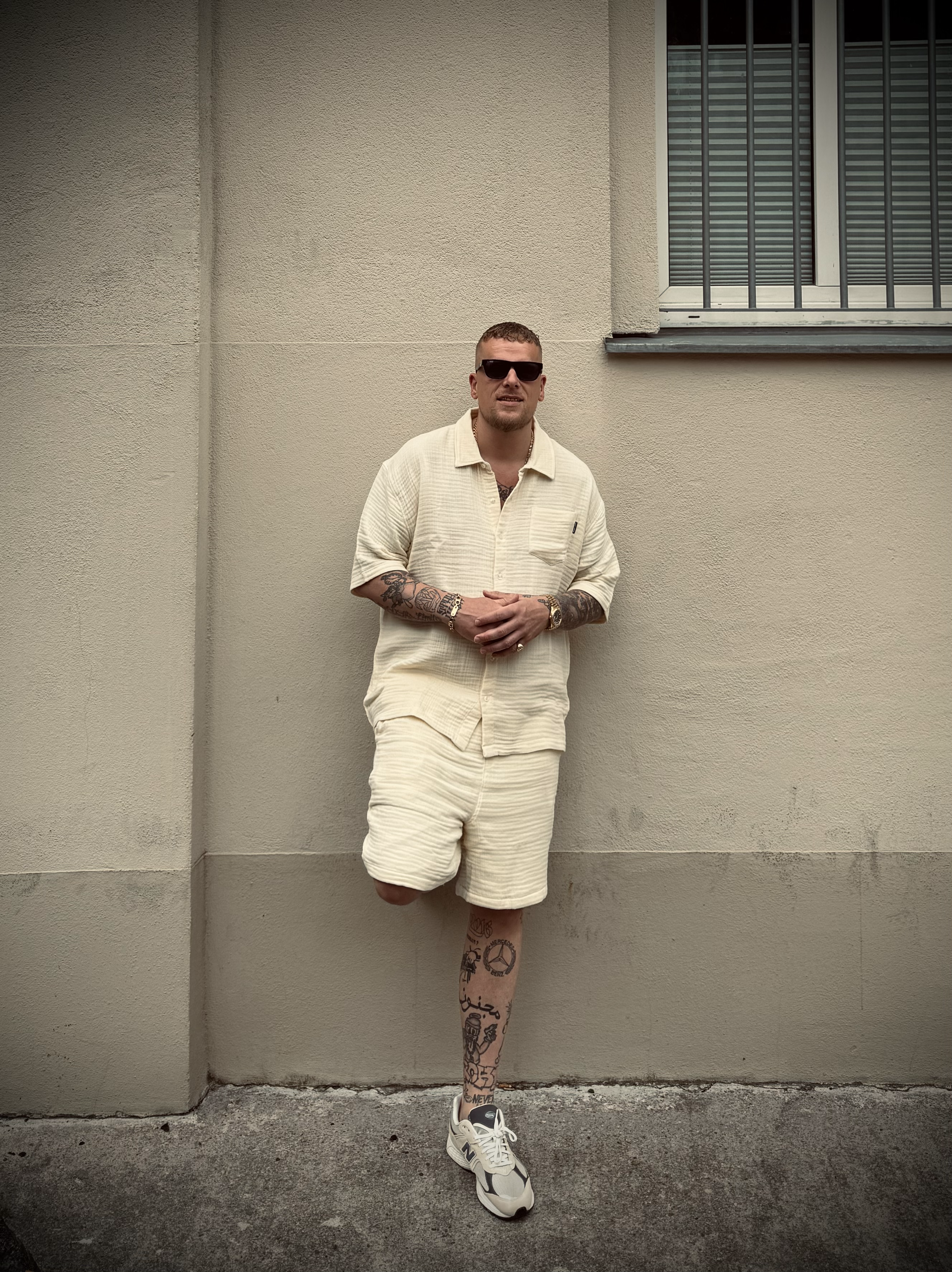
- Bonez MC in May 2024

Background information
- Born: John Lorenz Moser; 23 December 1985 (age 40); Hamburg, West Germany
- Genres: Hip hop
- Occupations: Rapper; singer; songwriter; record producer
- Years active: 2006–present
- Labels: 187 Strassenbande; Toprott Muzik; Soulfood; Vertigo; Capitol; Universal Music Germany; Sony Music Germany; Jentown Crhyme; RBK; Gold League; Auf! Keinen! Fall!

John Lorenz Moser (born 23 December 1985), professionally known as Bonez MC, is a German rapper, singer, songwriter, and record producer. He is one of the leading figures in German hip hop and a prominent member of the 187 Strassenbande collective.

== Early life ==
Bonez MC was born in Hamburg, West Germany. Not much is publicly known about his early childhood or family background, but his lyrics often reference life in Hamburg and his experiences growing up in the urban environment. He adopted the name Bonez MC as part of his musical identity and began actively performing in the mid-2000s.

== Career ==
=== 2006–2011: Formation and underground success ===
Bonez MC began his music career in the Hamburg underground rap scene, gaining recognition for his gritty lyricism and collaborations with other up-and-coming German rappers. He co-founded the rap collective 187 Strassenbande in the late 2000s, which quickly garnered attention for its raw sound and street credibility.

=== 2012–2014: Krampfhaft kriminell and early collaborations ===
In 2012, Bonez MC released his debut solo album, Krampfhaft kriminell, via his independent label Toprott Muzik. The album showcased his distinct voice, street-focused themes, and introduced him to a wider audience.

The following year, he collaborated with rapper Kontra K on a joint EP, and in 2014, he released the collaborative album High und Hungrig with 187 member Gzuz. The album’s underground success further solidified their reputation.

=== 2015–2017: Breakthrough with High & Hungrig 2 and Palmen aus Plastik ===
In 2015, Bonez MC and Gzuz released High & Hungrig 2, which debuted at number 9 on the German Albums Chart. It marked the first major commercial breakthrough for 187 Strassenbande.

In 2016, Bonez MC collaborated with Austrian rapper and producer RAF Camora to release Palmen aus Plastik. The album was a massive commercial success in German-speaking Europe, topping charts and achieving platinum status. The singles "Palmen aus Plastik", "Ohne mein Team", and "Mörder" became anthems of the genre.

=== 2018–2020: Continued success and Hollywood ===
Bonez MC continued his collaboration with RAF Camora on Palmen aus Plastik 2 in 2018, which also achieved critical and commercial acclaim. In 2020, he released his solo album Hollywood, which peaked at number one in Germany.

He later released an extended version, Hollywood Uncut, featuring additional tracks and guest appearances.

=== 2021–present: Gameboy and recent work ===
Bonez MC remained active with 187 Strassenbande, regularly releasing collaborative tracks and mixtapes. In 2024, he released the album Gameboy, a project that combined nostalgic 2000s aesthetics with modern trap and dancehall influences.

He has also experimented with visual media and streetwear branding, further elevating his cultural influence in Germany.

== Artistry ==
Bonez MC is known for his gravelly voice, energetic delivery, and versatile use of trap, dancehall, and hip hop beats. His lyrics often revolve around street life, loyalty, partying, and brotherhood. His collaborations with RAF Camora introduced Caribbean and reggaeton influences into German hip hop.

== 187 Strassenbande ==
Bonez MC is a founding and core member of 187 Strassenbande, a Hamburg-based hip hop crew that includes rappers Gzuz, Maxwell, LX, Sa4, producer Jambeatz, and graffiti artist Frost. The group is known for its strong DIY ethic, releasing music independently and cultivating a strong fanbase through online presence and street-level marketing.

Former members include AchtVier, Mosh36, and Hasuna.

== Public image and influence ==
Bonez MC is widely regarded as one of the most influential figures in German hip hop. Known for his authentic persona and close connection to fans, he has also faced criticism over controversial lyrics and public behavior. Nonetheless, his impact on modern German rap, particularly in bringing trap and dancehall sounds into the mainstream, is significant.

== Discography ==
=== Studio albums ===
- Krampfhaft kriminell (2012)
- Hollywood (2020)
- Hollywood Uncut (2020)
- Gameboy (2024)

=== Collaborative albums ===
- High und Hungrig (with Gzuz, 2014)
- High & Hungrig 2 (with Gzuz, 2016)
- Palmen aus Plastik (with RAF Camora, 2016)
- Palmen aus Plastik 2 (with RAF Camora, 2018)
- Palmen aus Plastik 3 (with RAF Camora, 2021)

== Awards ==
=== Hiphop.de Awards ===
- 2016: Best National Group (with RAF Camora)
- 2016: Best National Release (Palmen aus Plastik with RAF Camora)
- 2016: Best National Video (Palmen aus Gold with RAF Camora)
- 2018: Best National Group (with RAF Camora)

=== 1Live Krone ===
- 2016: Best Hip-Hop Act (with RAF Camora)

=== Juice Awards ===
- 2016: Best National Album (Palmen aus Plastik with RAF Camora)
