= Nathan Evans discography =

- Studio albums: 3
- Singles: 29
- Music videos: 13

The discography of Scottish musician Nathan Evans includes three studio albums, twenty–nine singles and thirteen music videos. In 2021, he released the single "Wellerman", followed by a remix version featuring 220 Kid and Billen Ted. The single achieved considerable commercial success worldwide, including in the United States, where it was certified Gold by the Recording Industry Association of America (RIAA) for sales in excess of 500,000 copies. In the United Kingdom, it peaked at number one on the UK Singles Charts and was subsequently certified 2× Platinum by the British Phonographic Industry (BPI) for sales in excess of 1 million copies. The single achieved similar commercial success in international territories including Australia, Belgium and Germany. His debut album, Wellerman – The Album was released in November 2022, and whilst it failed to match the commercial success experienced by the single, it did, however, achieve moderate commercial success in Germany and Switzerland.

In November 2024, he released his second studio album, 1994, to greater commercial success than that experienced by his debut album. It peaked at number one on the albums charts in his native Scotland, and in the United Kingdom, it peaked at number twenty–six. It performed strongly in the Albums Downloads, Physical Albums and Folk Albums Charts in the United Kingdom, where it peaked at numbers four, five and two respectively. The third single to be released from 1994, "Heather on the Hill", achieved moderate commercial success in both the United Kingdom and the Republic of Ireland, and was certified Silver by the BPI for sales in excess of 200,000 copies.

On 16 January 2026, he released a collaborative album with Scottish duo Saint Phnx, Angels' Share, which debuted atop the albums charts in their native Scotland, and reached numbers one and four on the Downloads Albums Charts and official Albums Charts in the United Kingdom respectively.

== Albums ==
=== Studio albums ===
Title	Details	Peak chart positions			
Title	Details	SCO	UK	GER	SWI
Wellerman – The Album	Released: 4 November 2022; Label: Electrola, Universal Music; Formats: CD, digital download, streaming	—	—	12	30
1994	Released: 8 November 2024; Label: Better Now Records, Universal Music; Formats: CD, digital download, streaming	1	26	34	65
Angels' Share (with Saint Phnx)	Released: 16 January 2026; Label: Better Now Records, Universal Music; Formats: CD, digital download, streaming	1	4	69	—

== Singles ==
Title	Year	Peak chart positions										Certifications	Album
Title	Year	UK	AUS	AUT	BEL (FL)	CAN	GER	IRL	NLD	NOR	SWE	Certifications	Album
"All I Want" / "Riptide" / "Leave Her Johnny" (Note: Nathan Evanss is the name of a three-song single.)	2020	—	—	—	—	—	—	—	—	—	—	—	Non-album singles
"Memories"	2020	—	—	—	—	—	—	—	—	—	—	—	Non-album singles
"YOU."	2020	—	—	—	—	—	—	—	—	—	—	—	Non-album singles
"Hollywood (Acoustic)"	2020	—	—	—	—	—	—	—	—	—	—	—	Non-album singles
"Wellerman (Sea Shanty)"	2021	—	–	1	1	54	1	—	—	1	9	ARIA: 2× Platinum; BEA: Gold; MC: 4× Platinum; IFPI SWI: Gold; RIAA: Gold	Wellerman – The Album
"Wellerman" (220 Kid x Billen Ted remix)	2021	1	62	1	—	—	—	2	1	1	—	BPI: 2× Platinum; BVMI: Diamond; GLF: 3× Platinum; IFPI AUT: 3× Platinum	Wellerman – The Album
"Told You So"	2021	—	38	—	23	—	—	—	—	—	—	—	Non-album singles
Told You So"(Digital Farm Animals remix)	2021	—	—	—	—	—	—	—	—	—	—	—	Non-album singles
"Ring Ding (A Scotsman's Story)"	2021	—	84	—	—	—	—	—	—	—	—	—	Non-album singles
"Merry Christmas Everyone" / "Driving Home for Christmas" / "Auld Lang Syne" (Note: Merry Christmas is the name of a three-song single.)	2021	—	—	—	—	—	—	—	—	—	—	—	Non-album singles
"The Last Shanty"	2022	—	—	—	—	—	—	—	—	—	—		Wellerman – The Album
"Drunken Sailor"	2022	—	—	—	—	—	—	—	—	—	—	—	Wellerman – The Album
"Drunken Sailor" (Harris & Ford remix)	2022	—	—	—	—	—	—	—	—	—	—	—	Wellerman – The Album
"Catch You When You Fall"	2023	—	—	—	—	—	—	—	—	—	—	—	1994
"Days of Our Lives"	2023	—	—	—	—	—	—	—	—	—	—	—	1994
"Driving to Nowhere"	2023	—	—	—	—	—	—	—	—	—	—	—	1994
"Heather on the Hill"	2024	42	—	—	—	—	—	30	—	—	—	BPI: Silver	1994
"Highland Girl"	2024	—	26	—	—	—	—	—	—	—	—	—	1994
"Home" (with Saint Phnx)	2024	— (Note: "Home" did not enter the UK Singles Chart, but peaked at number 13 on the UK Singles Downloads Chart.)	13	—	—	—	—	—	—	—	—	—	Non-album single
"100 Miles"	2024	—	—	—	—	—	—	—	—	—	—	—	1994
"Flowers in the Water"	2024	—	27	—	—	—	—	—	—	—	—	—	1994
"Sweet Mountain Rose"	2024	—	—	—	—	—	—	—	—	—	—	—	1994
"Perfect Storm"	2024	—	—	—	—	—	—	—	—	—	—	—	1994
"Old Man's Grace"	2025	—	—	—	—	—	—	—	—	—	—		1994 (Deluxe Edition)
"Arabella" (with Saint Phnx)	2025	— (Note: "Arabella" did not enter the UK Singles Chart, but peaked at number 15 on the UK Singles Downloads Chart.)	—	—	—	—	—	—	—	—	—		Angels' Share
"Milarrochy Bay" (with Saint Phnx)	2025	— (Note: "Milarrochy Bay" did not enter the UK Singles Chart, but peaked at number 12 on the UK Singles Downloads Chart.)	—	—	—	—	—	—	—	—	—		Angels' Share
"Home (World Cup 2026)" (with Saint Phnx)	2026	—	—	—	—	—	—	—	—	—	—		Non-album single
"—" denotes a title that did not chart, or was not released in that territory.
