= Santianna =

Sea shanty about Mexican General Santa Anna

"Santianna", also known as "Plains of Mexico", or spelled as "Santiana", "Santy Anna", "Santayana", "Santiano", "Santy Anno", etc., is a sea shanty about the Mexican General Antonio López de Santa Anna. The song is listed as number 207 in the Roud Folk Song Index.

== Origin ==
The theme of the shanty, which dates from at least the 1850s, may have been inspired by topical events in the news related to conflicts between the armies of Mexico, commanded by Antonio López de Santa Anna, and the U.S., commanded by Zachary Taylor, in the Mexican–American War.

The lyrics are not historically accurate: for example, both the Battle of Monterrey and the Battle of Molino del Rey (different versions refer to one or other) were US victories, not Mexican ones. Some suggest that this tradition was caused by British sailors, who deserted their ships to join Santa Anna's forces.

== Lyrics ==
As with many shanties, there are many recorded variations on the words and tunes, which may have developed on particular shipping lines—and the shantymen who led the shanties would make up their own versions as they went along, many of which were never recorded.

Shantyman and shanty collector Stan Hugill wrote that "Santianna" was originally a pump shanty, but became a popular capstan shanty in the call and response form. Hugill states that there were many variations in the refrain.

Alan Lomax published a completely different version, that he heard from a sailor called J.M. Hunt in 1935.

In the 1950s and 1960s, shanties became popularised as part of the American folk music revival and British folk revival, and Santianna became part of the musical repertoire of musicians including Paul Clayton and The Clancy Brothers.

Sometimes there is an additional chorus or bridge, after A. L. Lloyd.

== Other versions ==
=== Versions in English ===
One English variant recorded by both Odetta (1956) and The Kingston Trio (1958) is about a ship that leaves from Liverpool to California "Plenty of gold, So I've Been told, way out in California". The Weavers album The Weavers at Home (1958) describes a journey from Boston to California. These versions are probably about the California Gold Rush and based on Lomax's version.

The soundtrack to the game Pillars of Eternity II: Deadfire includes an adaptation of the song called Aim Spirente. Its lyrics are similar to Hugues Aufray's Santiano, but adapted to fit the game's lore. The lyrics, written on a scrap of paper, can also be found as an in-game item.

The Longest Johns recorded a version on their 2018 album Between Wind and Water, as well as a mixed French and English cover with Justine Galmiche from the band SKÁLD. A cappella group, Home Free, would excerpt this version as part of their 2021 Sea Shanty Medley, released into the "social media craze" surrounding shanties and similar songs during the COVID-19 social distancing lockdowns. This vogue would draw attention to and inspire other ensembles to record and release the song on various social media and streaming platforms.

Catalan-language folk group El Pony Pisador released a metal version of Santiana in English in 2019.

=== Versions in French ===
"Santiano" was recorded in 1961 by Hugues Aufray and refers to a ship leaving Saint Malo bound to San Francisco, described as a wealthy place. It became very popular and has inspired several versions including the reality show Star Academy in 2005.

=== Versions in Welsh ===
A Welsh language version of Santiana was recorded by Welsh folk singer Meic Stevens in 1969. It remained unreleased until 2002, when it was released on the Disgwyl Rhywbeth Gwell i Ddod compilation. Stevens' version of the song contains references to contemporary events in Wales such as the incarceration of Free Wales Army soldiers in 1969. This version has also inspired recent recordings of the song by Alun Gaffey, Cowbois Rhos Botwnnog, Iwcs a Gaff and Alaw.

=== Versions in other languages ===
In 2008, German folk-collective Werkraum under leadership by Axel Frank recorded their own adaption of the English original using some changes in the verses, referring to Tory Island instead of Liverpool, probably inspired by a stormy cruise to the north-west coast of Ireland and the historical Irish immigration to America.

In 2012, the German group Santiano recorded a new version of this song. The group has had much success, and received an Echo for their first album containing Santiano as well as other shanties. In 2022, the group released a Version with new English lyrics that also features Nathan Evans, with whom the band had previously collaborated for their version of "Wellerman".

Metusa, a German Folk-Rock band, recorded a German version of this shanty called "Santyano" which appears on their album "Piratenseele".

There is a Norwegian version of this song about a man who sails from Copenhagen to Kristiansand and meets a girl with whom he spends a night. He then has to travel to India and, when he arrives, he is handed a letter saying that his Norwegian friend is dead. He never returned to Norway for his Anna is dead. The song is remodeled by Storm Weather Shanty Choir.

There is a version in Icelandic, called "Fulla ferð Santíanó" ("Full Ahead Santiano"), a seaman's story about sailing home after days at sea, written by Siggi Björns an Icelandic musician and an ex-fisherman. This version was recorded and realised on a CD with a band called "Æfing" from a small fishing town, Flateyri, in the Icelandic Westfjords.
