= List of number-one hits of 2021 (Switzerland) =

This is a list of the Swiss Hitparade number-one hits of 2021.

== Swiss charts ==
Issue date	Song	Artist	Album	Artist
3 January	"Jerusalema (Remix)"	Master KG featuring Burna Boy and Nomcebo Zikode	Power Up	AC/DC
10 January	"Jerusalema (Remix)"	Master KG featuring Burna Boy and Nomcebo Zikode	Power Up	AC/DC
17 January	"Jerusalema (Remix)"	Master KG featuring Burna Boy and Nomcebo Zikode	Splitter aus Glück	Daniela Alfinito
24 January	"Jerusalema (Remix)"	Master KG featuring Burna Boy and Nomcebo Zikode	Unplugged	Pegasus
31 January	"Jerusalema (Remix)"	Master KG featuring Burna Boy and Nomcebo Zikode	Unplugged	Pegasus
7 February	"Jerusalema (Remix)"	Master KG featuring Burna Boy and Nomcebo Zikode	Hautnah	Vincent Gross
14 February	"Jerusalema (Remix)"	Master KG featuring Burna Boy and Nomcebo Zikode	Medicine at Midnight	Foo Fighters
21 February	"Jerusalema (Remix)"	Master KG featuring Burna Boy and Nomcebo Zikode	Pass	Dodo
28 February	"Wellerman"	Nathan Evans	Adios amigos – Live @ Wacken	Krokus
7 March	"Wellerman"	Nathan Evans	The Ghost Orchestra	The Ghost Orchestra
14 March	"Wellerman"	Nathan Evans	2021: À côté de vous	Les Enfoirés
21 March	"Wellerman"	Nathan Evans	Mai	Kunz
28 March	"Wellerman"	Nathan Evans	Chemtrails over the Country Club	Lana Del Rey
4 April	"Wellerman"	Nathan Evans	The Bitter Truth	Evanescence
11 April	"Wellerman"	Nathan Evans	Abentüür Monschterschlucht	Schwiizergoofe
18 April	"Wellerman"	Nathan Evans	Sing meinen Song - Das Schweizer Tauschkonzert - Volume 2	Various artists
25 April	"Wellerman"	Nathan Evans	Californian Soil	London Grammar
2 May	"Wellerman"	Nathan Evans	Sing meinen Song - Das Schweizer Tauschkonzert - Volume 2	Various artists
9 May	"Wellerman"	Nathan Evans	Stay High	Ufo361
16 May	"Wellerman"	Nathan Evans	Heimspiel	Blay
23 May	"Wellerman"	Nathan Evans	Sampler 5	187 Strassenbande
30 May	"Tout l'univers"	Gjon's Tears	Earth, Wind & Feiern	Jan Delay
6 June	"Good 4 U"	Olivia Rodrigo	Reprise	Moby
13 June	"Good 4 U"	Olivia Rodrigo	Hardware	Billy Gibbons
20 June	"Good 4 U"	Olivia Rodrigo	Neue Welt	Azet
27 June	"Beggin'"	Måneskin	Bahama Sunshine	Calimeros
4 July	"Beggin'"	Måneskin	HeimatLiebe	Kastelruther Spatzen
11 July	"Beggin'"	Måneskin	Aqua	Luciano
18 July	"Bad Habits"	Ed Sheeran	Freiheit	Die Amigos
25 July	"Bad Habits"	Ed Sheeran	Zukunft	RAF Camora
1 August	"Bad Habits"	Ed Sheeran	Asozialer Marokkaner	Farid Bang
8 August	"Bad Habits"	Ed Sheeran	Happier Than Ever	Billie Eilish
15 August	"Bad Habits"	Ed Sheeran	Happier Than Ever	Billie Eilish
22 August	"Bad Habits"	Ed Sheeran	Herzfarben	Francine Jordi
29 August	"Bad Habits"	Ed Sheeran	Happier Than Ever	Billie Eilish
5 September	"Bad Habits"	Ed Sheeran	Alles was du brauchst	Beatrice Egli
12 September	"Don't Shut Me Down"	ABBA	Senjutsu	Iron Maiden
19 September	"Bad Habits"	Ed Sheeran	Gold – Das Jubiläumsalbum mit allen Hits und neuen Liedern	Heimweh
26 September	"Love Nwantiti"	CKay featuring Joeboy and Kuami Eugene	10	Schwiizergoofe
3 October	"Love Nwantiti"	CKay featuring Joeboy and Kuami Eugene	Dunkel	Die Ärzte
10 October	"Love Nwantiti"	CKay featuring Joeboy and Kuami Eugene	Zukunft	RAF Camora
17 October	"Love Nwantiti"	CKay featuring Joeboy and Kuami Eugene	Wenn die Kälte kommt	Santiano
24 October	"Easy on Me"	Adele	Rausch	Helene Fischer
31 October	"Easy on Me"	Adele	Handwärch	Gölä and Trauffer
7 November	"Shivers"	Ed Sheeran	=	Ed Sheeran
14 November	"Shivers"	Ed Sheeran	Voyage	ABBA
21 November	"Shivers"	Ed Sheeran	Voyage	ABBA
28 November	"Easy on Me"	Adele	30	Adele
5 December	"Easy on Me"	Adele	30	Adele
12 December	"Merry Christmas"	Ed Sheeran and Elton John	30	Adele
19 December	"All I Want for Christmas Is You"	Mariah Carey	30	Adele
26 December	"All I Want for Christmas Is You"	Mariah Carey	Voyage	ABBA
