= Santiano =

Santiano may refer to:

- Santiano (band), German band in the Eurovision Song Contest 2014
- "Santiano" (song), 1961 song by French singer Hugues Aufray, cover version No.1 in France 2005
- "Aweigh, Santy Ano", version by The Weavers 1958, of "Santianna", the original sea shanty tune on which Aufray's song is based
