= Home (Nathan Evans song) =

2024 single by Nathan Evans and Saint PHNX

Single by Nathan Evans and Saint Phnx
- Released: 25 April 2024
- Length: 2:18
- Label: Better Now Records, Universal Music
- Songwriters: Nathan Evans, Alan Jukes, Stephen Jukes, Lewis Gardiner
- Producers: Alan Jukes, Stephen Jukes, Lewis Gardiner

Nathan Evans singles chronology
| "Heather on the Hill" (2024) | "Home" (2024) | "100 Miles" (2024) |

"Home" is a 2024 single by Scottish singer-songwriter Nathan Evans and Scottish band Saint Phnx. It was released as a single–only release on 25 April 2024 through Better Now Records and Universal Music. The song was written by Nathan Evans alongside Alan Jukes, Stephen Jukes, and Lewis Gardiner.

== Background and release ==
Following the release of "Heather on the Hill", Evans collaborated with Saint PHNX on "Home", which was issued digitally on 25 April 2024 by Better Now Records and Universal Music. "Home" was developed as a collaborative release between Evans and Saint PHNX during a period in which Evans was releasing a series of football- and identity-themed songs. The track was released digitally in April 2024 and promoted through live performances and social media platforms. The single forms part of a wider sequence of releases by Nathan Evans in 2024, including "Heather on the Hill" and "100 Miles". These singles contributed to the development of his second studio album 1994 (2024), which charted at number one in Scotland and number 26 in the UK Albums Chart.

== Composition ==
The song is a pop-influenced anthem centred on themes of national identity and belonging, with lyrical references to Scotland as "home". Production was handled by Alan Jukes, Stephen Jukes, and Lewis Gardiner.

== Live performances ==
In June 2024, Evans and Saint Phnx performed the song at a Glasgow fan zone during UEFA Euro 2024, where it was presented alongside traditional Scottish songs and other contemporary supporter chants. The performance formed part of pre-match entertainment for Scotland fixtures and was broadcast in fan-generated media from the event. The song was also included in setlists during the duo’s joint live performances later in 2024, including a sold-out show at SWG3 in Glasgow, where it was performed as part of a wider set combining Evans’ solo material with Saint PHNX songs. Reviews of the performance noted strong audience participation during collaborative songs, including "Home".

In 2026, Evans and Saint Phnx performed "Home" as part of a series of promotional live appearances tied to their collaborative album Angels' Share. These included pop-up performances and festival appearances across Scotland, where the song was frequently used as a closing number in sets.

== Reception and cultural impact ==
=== UEFA Euro 2024 ===
During UEFA Euro 2024, "Home" was associated with Scotland supporters and circulated as part of the wider group of unofficial fan songs linked to the national team’s participation in the tournament. The Scotland team competed at a major men’s international tournament held in Germany, prompting significant travel and cultural activity among supporters.

Coverage of Scotland’s Euro 2024 campaign highlighted the importance of music, chants, and supporter songs in shaping the atmosphere created by travelling fans. "Home" was among several contemporary tracks used in fan environments and online spaces during the tournament period.

=== Use in political media ===
In 2026, "Home" was reportedly used in digital campaign advertising associated with the Scottish Labour Party during the 2026 Scottish Parliament election campaign. The song was used as background music in promotional material intended to evoke themes of national identity and community. No formal endorsement of the political use of the song was made by Nathan Evans or Saint PHNX, and its use in campaign material was not accompanied by public statements from the artists.

== Track listing ==
Digital download and streaming

1. "Home" – 2:18

== Charts ==
Weekly chart performance for Home
| Chart (2024) | Peak position |
|---|---|
| Australia (ARIA) | 13 |
| UK Singles Sales (OCC) | 14 |
| UK Singles Downloads (OCC) | 13 |

== Personnel ==
- Nathan Evans – vocals, songwriting
- Saint Phnx – featured artist
- Alan Jukes – songwriting, production
- Stephen Jukes – songwriting, production
- Lewis Gardiner – songwriting, production

== Release history ==
| Date | Format | Label |
|---|---|---|
| 25 April 2024 | Digital download, streaming | Better Now Records |
