= List of number-one hits of 2021 (Austria) =

This is a list of the Austrian number-one singles and albums of 2021 as compiled by Ö3 Austria Top 40, the official chart provider of Austria.

Issue date	Song	Artist	Album	Artist
1 January	No Top 40 released			
8 January	"All I Want for Christmas Is You"	Mariah Carey	Power Up	AC/DC
15 January	"7"	Ufo361 and Bonez MC	Power Up	AC/DC
22 January	"Drivers License"	Olivia Rodrigo	Splitter aus Glück	Daniela Alfinito
29 January	"Drivers License"	Olivia Rodrigo	Neujahrskonzert 2021 - New Year's Concert	Wiener Philharmoniker/Riccardo Muti
5 February	"Drivers License"	Olivia Rodrigo	Kvitravn	Wardruna
12 February	"Ohne dich"	Kasimir1441 featuring Badmómzjay and Wildbwoys	Eure Mami	Katja Krasavice
19 February	"Ohne dich"	Kasimir1441 featuring Badmómzjay and Wildbwoys	Medicine at Midnight	Foo Fighters
26 February	"Ohne dich"	Kasimir1441 featuring Badmómzjay and Wildbwoys	Peter - Unvergesslich - Seine grössten Hits & Schlager	Peter Alexander
5 March	"Madonna"	Bausa and Apache 207	Aghori	Kool Savas
12 March	"Wellerman"	Nathan Evans, 220 Kid, Billen Ted	Peter - Unvergesslich - Seine grössten Hits & Schlager	Peter Alexander
19 March	"Wellerman"	Nathan Evans, 220 Kid, Billen Ted	When You See Yourself	Kings of Leon
26 March	"Wellerman"	Nathan Evans, 220 Kid, Billen Ted	Rot	Ina Regen
2 April	"Wellerman"	Nathan Evans, 220 Kid, Billen Ted	Hello!	Maite Kelly
9 April	"Wellerman"	Nathan Evans, 220 Kid, Billen Ted	Rot	Ina Regen
16 April	"Wellerman"	Nathan Evans, 220 Kid, Billen Ted	Justice	Justin Bieber
23 April	"Montero (Call Me by Your Name)"	Lil Nas X	Ciao!	Giovanni Zarrella
30 April	"Wellerman"	Nathan Evans, 220 Kid, Billen Ted	Let the Bad Times Roll	The Offspring
7 May	"Wellerman"	Nathan Evans, 220 Kid, Billen Ted	Rohdiamant	Samra
14 May	"Wellerman"	Nathan Evans, 220 Kid, Billen Ted	Stay High	Ufo361
21 May	"Wellerman"	Nathan Evans, 220 Kid, Billen Ted	Vielleicht irgendwann	Wincent Weiss
28 May	"Wellerman"	Nathan Evans, 220 Kid, Billen Ted	Sampler 5	187 Strassenbande
4 June	"Good 4 U"	Olivia Rodrigo	Aus dem Licht in den Schatten zurück	Kontra K
11 June	"Good 4 U"	Olivia Rodrigo	Rap über Hass	K.I.Z
18 June	"Good 4 U"	Olivia Rodrigo	Sour	Olivia Rodrigo
25 June	"Good 4 U"	Olivia Rodrigo	Spring bevor du fällst	Buntspecht
2 July	"Beggin'"	Måneskin	Bahama Sunshine	Calimeros
9 July	"Beggin'"	Måneskin	HeimatLiebe	Kastelruther Spatzen
16 July	"Beggin'"	Måneskin	Seelenrausch	Nik P.
23 July	"Beggin'"	Måneskin	Freiheit	Die Amigos
30 July	"Zukunft"	RAF Camora	Zukunft	RAF Camora
6 August	"Blaues Licht"	RAF Camora and Bonez MC	Zukunft	RAF Camora
13 August	"Blaues Licht"	RAF Camora and Bonez MC	Happier Than Ever	Billie Eilish
20 August	"Bad Habits"	Ed Sheeran	Happier Than Ever	Billie Eilish
27 August	"Stay"	The Kid Laroi and Justin Bieber	Happier Than Ever	Billie Eilish
3 September	"Stay"	The Kid Laroi and Justin Bieber	Sour	Olivia Rodrigo
10 September	"Stay"	The Kid Laroi and Justin Bieber	Donda	Kanye West
17 September	"Stay"	The Kid Laroi and Justin Bieber	Senjutsu	Iron Maiden
24 September	"2CB"	RAF Camora featuring Luciano	Metallica	Metallica
1 October	"Stay"	The Kid Laroi and Justin Bieber	The Bootleg Series Vol. 16: Springtime in New York 1980–1985	Bob Dylan
8 October	"Stay"	The Kid Laroi and Justin Bieber	Dunkel	Die Ärzte
15 October	"Stay"	The Kid Laroi and Justin Bieber	Zukunft	RAF Camora
22 October	"Guapa"	RAF Camora	Echt Schlager − Die große Fete − Volume II	Die Grubertaler
29 October	"Easy on Me"	Adele	Rausch	Helene Fischer
5 November	"Easy on Me"	Adele	Rausch	Helene Fischer
12 November	"Shivers"	Ed Sheeran	=	Ed Sheeran
19 November	"Shivers"	Ed Sheeran	Voyage	ABBA
26 November	"Shivers"	Ed Sheeran	Voyage	ABBA
3 December	"Easy on Me"	Adele	30	Adele
10 December	"All I Want for Christmas Is You"	Mariah Carey	30	Adele
17 December	"All I Want for Christmas Is You"	Mariah Carey	Servant of the Mind	Volbeat
24 December	"All I Want for Christmas Is You"	Mariah Carey	Voyage	ABBA
31 December	No Top 40 released			
