= 2026 Commonwealth Games opening ceremony =

Opening ceremony for the 2026 Commonwealth Games

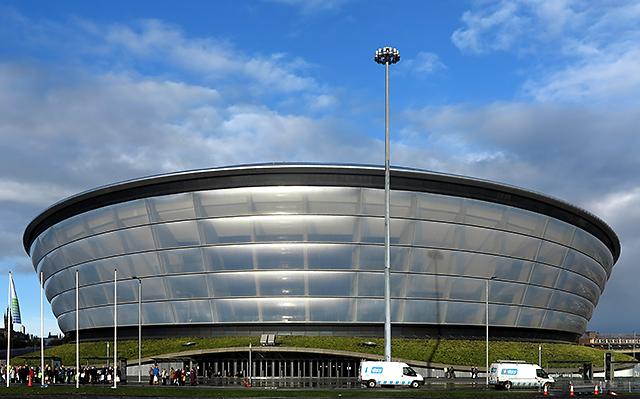
- The ceremony was hosted at the OVO Hydro
- Date: 23 July 2026
- Time: 20:00 BST (UTC+1)
- Location: OVO Hydro, Glasgow, Scotland
- Filmed by: TNT Sports; Channel 5
- Participants: KT Tunstall; Callum Beattie; Tom Walker; Nina Nesbitt; Nathan Evans; Saint Phnx; Valtos

The 2026 Commonwealth Games opening ceremony took place on 23 July 2026 at the OVO Hydro in Glasgow, Scotland. It officially opened the 2026 Commonwealth Games and marked the first time in the history of the Commonwealth Games that an opening ceremony was staged entirely within an indoor arena.

The ceremony was created by the Glasgow 2026 Organising Company, in partnership with People&Co, which served as the embedded delivery partner responsible for the creation and delivery of the Games’ opening and closing ceremonies. Louisa Mahon served as ceremonies chief, with Roxana Cole serving as show director, Amalie White as stage designer, Emily Jane Boyle as choreographer and Carole Millar as costume designer.

More than 600 volunteers participated in the ceremony alongside performers from across Scotland.

== Background ==
Following the selection of Glasgow as host of the 2026 Commonwealth Games, organisers announced that the opening and closing ceremonies would be scaled down compared with previous editions as part of the event's streamlined delivery model. In March 2026, the OVO Hydro was confirmed as the venue for the opening ceremony, becoming the first indoor venue to host a Commonwealth Games opening ceremony.

== Production ==
The ceremony has been described by organisers as a "Clyde-built experience for the world", celebrating Glasgow and Scotland through music, dance and performance. The Parade of Nations will feature athletes from all 74 Commonwealth Games Associations carrying their individually designed King's Batons following the conclusion of the King's Baton Relay.

=== Performers ===
In July 2026, Glasgow 2026 announced the first performers for the ceremony. Scottish singer-songwriter KT Tunstall was confirmed as the headline act, alongside Callum Beattie, Nina Nesbitt, Nathan Evans and Saint PHNX. Electronic folk duo Valtos will perform during the Parade of Nations. On 15 July 2026, it was announced that Tom Walker was added to the line-up.

== Broadcast ==
In the United Kingdom, the ceremony was broadcast live by TNT Sports, the domestic rights holder for the 2026 Commonwealth Games. Free-to-air highlights coverage, including the opening ceremony, was also shown by 5, with presentation by former Olympic sprinter Jeanette Kwakye. The ceremony was also broadcast free-to-air by BBC Alba with Gaelic language commentary.

== Proceedings ==
=== Opening ===
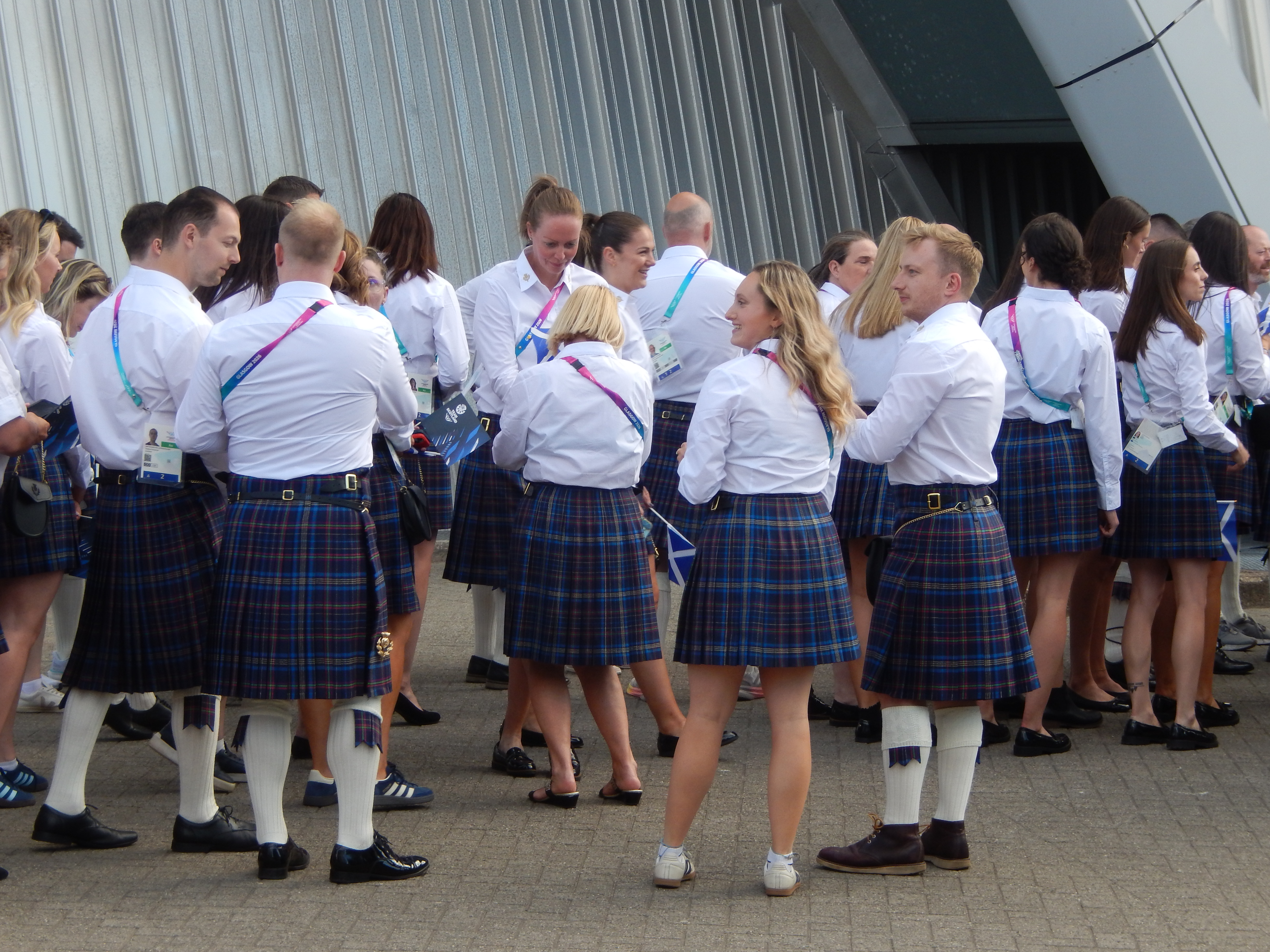
Athletes from Team Scotland waiting to enter the OVO Hydro for the opening ceremony

The ceremony began with a pre-recorded sequence featuring the TARDIS from the long-running British television series Doctor Who. A 50-metre-wide curved LED screen depicted the TARDIS travelling across Scotland, visiting landmarks including Loch Ness, The Kelpies and Edinburgh Castle. Sir Chris Hoy and Greg McHugh appeared operating the TARDIS, alongside the Seventh Doctor, portrayed by Sylvester McCoy.

The sequence concluded with the TARDIS making an unexpected stop at Balmoral Castle, where the King and Queen boarded before the time machine “materialised” on stage inside the Hydro. The royal couple then formally entered the arena to begin the ceremony. "God Save the King" was performed by the Royal Scottish National Orchestra Youth Chorus.

The Hydro floor was transformed in a large living garden connected by a Celtic knot-inspired walkway.

This was the first time since the 1998 Commonwealth Games that athletes had entered the arena before the cultural program. Prime Minister Andy Burnham attended the ceremony as one of his first official engagements following his appointment, who was seated alongside First Minister John Swinney.

=== Parade of Nations (Ceud mìle fàilte) ===
The Parade of Nations featured all 74 participating Commonwealth Games Associations entering the arena. The procession was accompanied by a live soundtrack performed by Scottish electronic-folk duo Valtos in collaboration with musicians representing nations from across the Commonwealth. The parade was entitled "Ceud mìle fàilte", a traditional Scottish Gaelic phrase which translates to "a hundred thousand welcomes". Each team carried its own uniquely designed King’s Baton, which was placed within the ceremony’s central garden. By the conclusion of the parade, the collection of all 74 Batons had transformed the stage into a symbolic living artwork celebrating the diversity of the Commonwealth, with host nation Scotland entering last.

=== Nessie ===
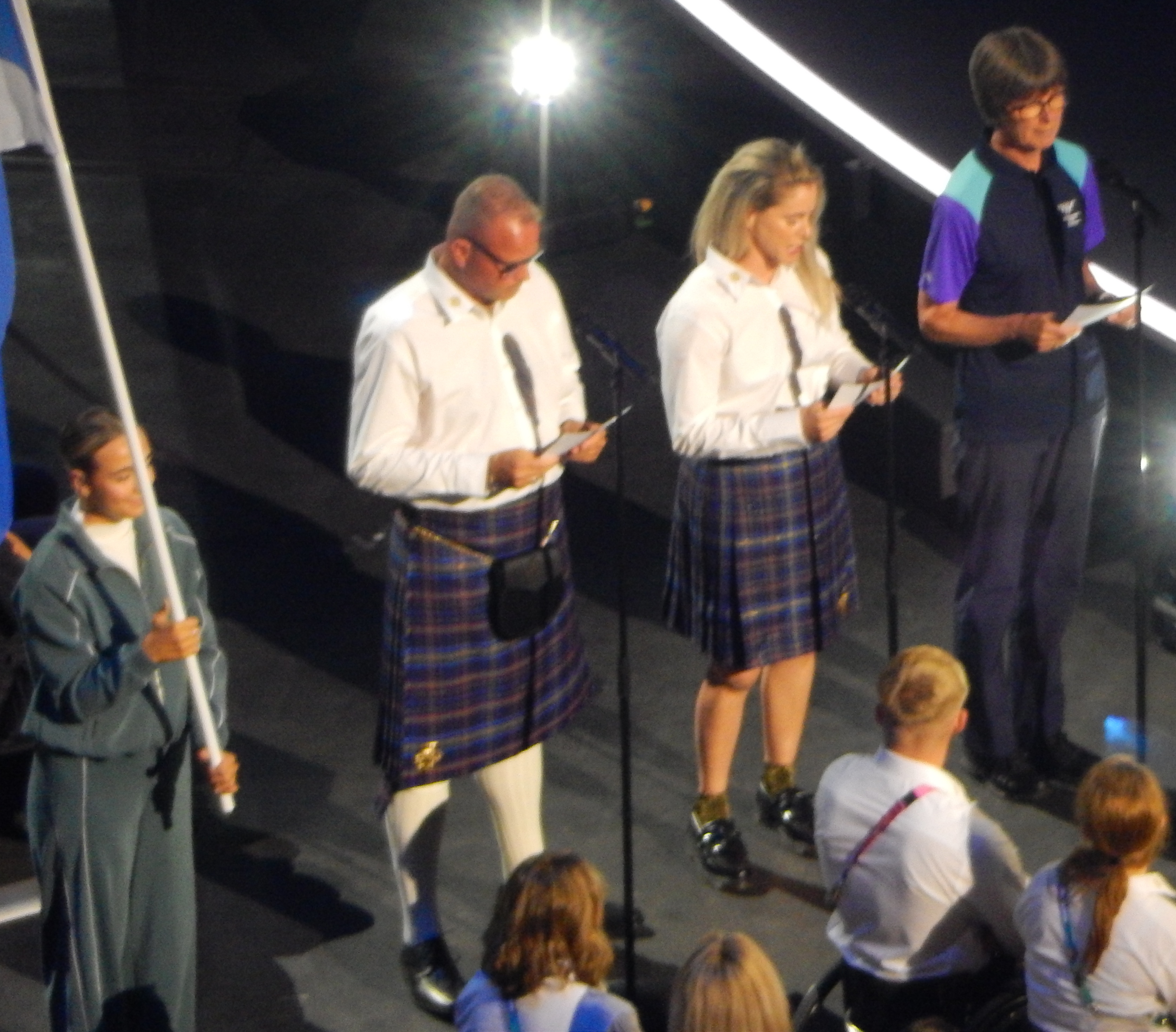
The Commonwealth Oath

Following the Parade of Nations, actor Sam Heughan appeared to summon the Loch Ness Monster, “Nessie”, into the arena. The sequence featured a large-scale theatrical representation of the creature accompanied by a massed pipe band performing the national anthem of Scotland, "Flower of Scotland". The segment celebrated Scottish folklore and national identity before transitioning into the artistic narrative of modern Glasgow.

=== Meet Me Under the Clock ===
The ceremony then shifted to a theatrical depiction of a common day in Glasgow, inspired by the city’s transport, communities and industries. The segment was accompanied by performances from Nathan Evans, Saint Phnx, GAÏA and Eyve.

Centred around Glasgow Central Station’s iconic clock, the sequence portrayed a musical flash mob of everyday commuters and residents. Choreographed performances paid tribute to generations of workers who built the city’s industrial heritage. A large woven fabric displaying the city’s slogan, “People Make Glasgow”, written in Scottish Gaelic, formed the centrepiece of the segment.

=== The Oath ===
Following the end of the artistic programme, the Commonwealth Flag was carried into the arena and raised. Scottish lawn bowls player Paul Foster, wheelchair basketball player Robyn Love and technical official Leslie Roy then jointly delivered the Commonwealth Oath on behalf of the athletes, officials and judges.

=== King’s Baton Message ===
As we gather, we celebrate the dedication and talent of every athlete and team. Your perseverance inspires us, and we eagerly anticipate your achievements in the coming days.

— Charles III, Head of Commonwealth

The King’s Baton was presented by Kieron Achara, Hannah Miley and Neil Fachie, to King Charles III, who then read the message placed inside the Baton prior to its journey around the Commonwealth, formally declaring the games open.

=== Final performances ===
The ceremony concluded with musical performances by Scottish singer-songwriter KT Tunstall and singer Tom Walker.

== Dignitaries in attendance ==
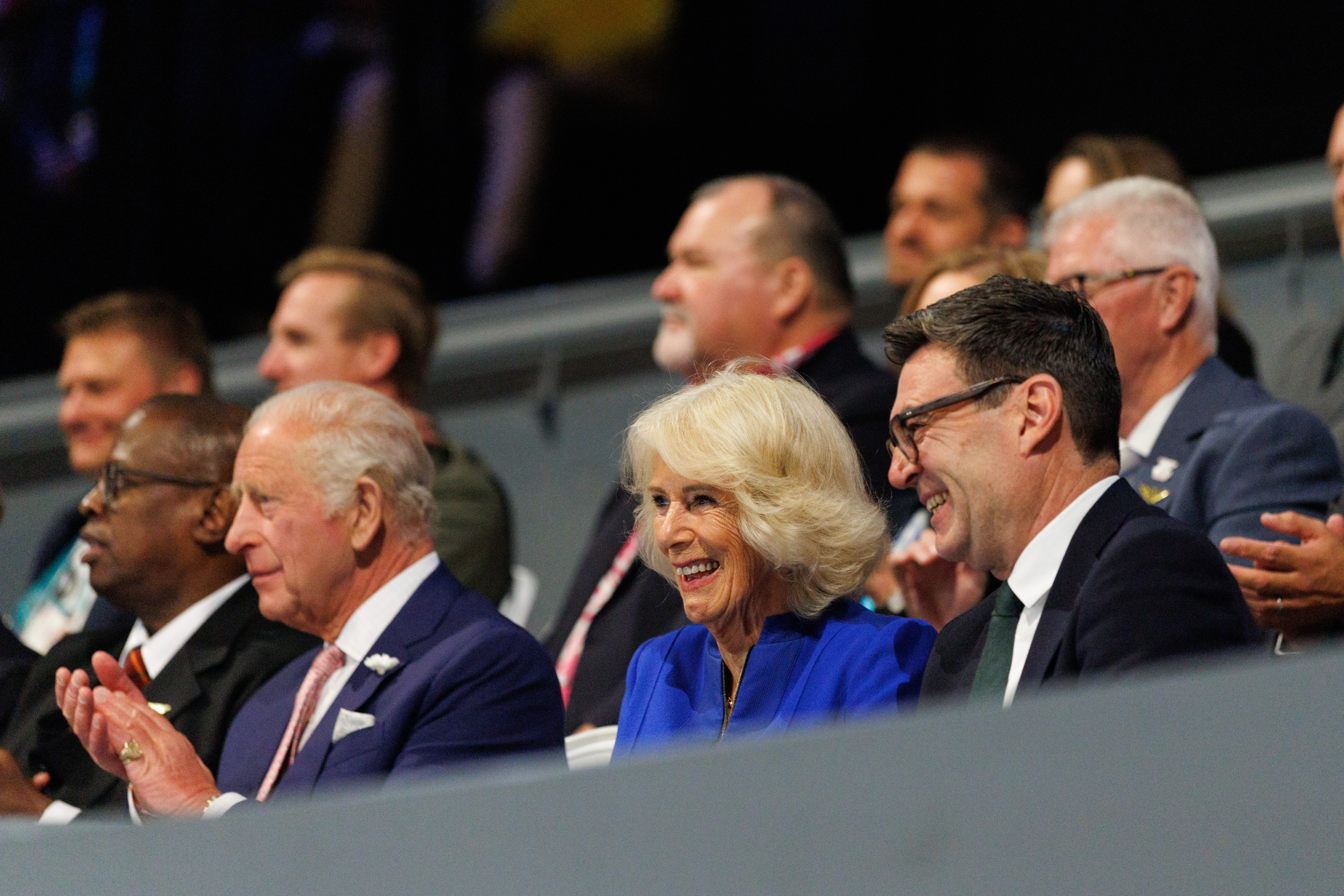
King Charles, Queen Camilla, Andy Burnham and other dignitaries

- Charles III, Patron of the Commonwealth Games Federation and Head of the Commonwealth
- Queen Camilla
- Prince Edward, Duke of Edinburgh, Vice Patron of the Commonwealth Games Federation
- Donald Rukare, President of the Commonwealth Games Federation
- Shirley Ayorkor Botchwey, the secretary-general of the Commonwealth of Nations
- Andy Burnham, Prime Minister of the United Kingdom
- Sam Mostyn, Governor-General of the Commonwealth of Australia
- (Canada) Marc Miller, Minister of Canadian Identity and Culture and Minister responsible for Official Languages
- John Swinney, First Minister of Scotland
- Rhun ap Iorwerth, First Minister of Wales
- Emma Little-Pengelly, Deputy First Minister of Northern Ireland

== See also ==
- 2026 Commonwealth Games
- 2014 Commonwealth Games opening ceremony
