= Highland Girl =

Single by Nathan Evans

from the album 1994
- Released: 26 April 2024
- Length: 3:00
- Label: Universal, GmbH
- Songwriters: Nathan Evans; Stevie Jukes; Alan Jukes; Lewis Gardiner

Nathan Evans singles chronology
"Heather on the Hill" (2024)	"Highland Girl" (2024)	"100 Miles" (2024)

"Highland Girl" is a song by the Scottish singer-songwriter Nathan Evans. It was released as a single on 26 April 2024 through Universal Music GmbH and was included on Evans' album 1994, released 8 November 2024.

== Critical reception ==
The Irish media website PureMzine wrote that the song "merges energetic vibes with folk-key pop elements" to produce a "danceable" and romantic composition.

== Credits and personnel ==
- Nathan Evans – vocals, songwriter
- Stevie Jukes – songwriter.
- Alan Jukes – songwriter
- Lewis Gardiner – songwriter

(Full production credits as listed on the single's digital release; producers and session musicians are credited on the album 1994 packaging.)

== Release history ==
Region	Date	Format	Label	Ref.
United Kingdom	26 April 2024	Digital download Streaming	Universal, GmbH	
Ireland	26 April 2024	Digital download Streaming	Universal Music, GmbH	
Worldwide	26 April 2024	Digital download Streaming	Universal Music, GmbH	
