= Wellerman – The Album =

Studio album by Nathan Evans
- Released: 4 November 2022
- Recorded: 2021–2022
- Genres: Folk, sea shanty, pop
- Labels: Electrola, Universal, GmbH
- Producer: Saltwives

Nathan Evans chronology
Wellerman – The Album (2022)	1994 (2024)

Wellerman – The Album is the debut album by the Scottish singer-songwriter Nathan Evans, released on 4 November 2022 by Electrola and Universal Music. It was supported by the lead single "Wellerman" which achieved global commercial success, reaching number 1 in the United Kingdom, Austria, Belgium and Germany. It was subsequently certified 2× Platinum by the British Phonographic Industry (BPI), and in the United States was certified Gold by the Recording Industry Association of America (RIAA), missing the Billboard Hot 100 by charting at number 116.

== Background and release ==
Following the viral success of his 2021 rendition of "Wellerman (Sea Shanty)", which sparked a global interest in sea shanties, Evans compiled a full album mixing traditional maritime songs, covers, and folk-influenced arrangements. The release came amid renewed mainstream fascination with folk-style music, catalysed largely by social media trends. Critical response to the album was mixed but acknowledged its role in defining Evans's post-viral career direction. A live review noted that the album "is a decent start, showcasing … the artist he wants to be," describing the record as an amalgam of folk-pop influences comparable to contemporary acoustic/pop-folk acts, with a mix of traditional songs and modern sensibilities. The review commented that Evans still showed enough charm and vocal strength to carry the material, despite limited experience.

In May 2021, it was announced that Evans was publishing a collection of Sea Shanties titled The Book of Sea Shanties: Wellerman and Other Songs from the Seven Seas. The book was published on 14 October 2021 by Welbeck, more than a year before the album was released. It contains 35 shanties and the stories around them.

== Track listing ==
Standard track listing
No.	Title	Length
1.	"Wellerman (Sea Shanty)"	2:35
2.	"Bully Boys"	2:22
3.	"Bully in the Alley"	3:29
4.	"Drunken Sailor"	2:12
5.	"Leave Her Johnny"	2:22
6.	"Roll the Old Chariot"	3:08
7.	"The Last Shanty"	2:01
8.	"Haul Away"	1:46
9.	"Wild Mountain Thyme"	3:04
10.	"Caledonia"	4:25
11.	"The Banks of Sacramento"	3:14
12.	"Shanty Man"	3:26
13.	"Wagon Wheel"	3:44
14.	"Wellerman" (220 Kid × Billen Ted remix)	1:56
15.	"Drunken Sailor" (Harris & Ford remix)	2:25
16.	"Santiano" (with Santiano)	3:04
Total length:		45:13

=== Notes ===
- The song "Leave Her Johnny" was originally on Evans' self-titled EP.
- The songs "Roll the Old Chariot", "Drunken Sailor", "Wellerman", "Bully in the Alley", and "Leave Her Johnny" were all included in Evans' book The Book of Sea Shanties: Wellerman and Other Songs from the Seven Seas, and were eventually placed on this album.
- The song "Wagon Wheel" was originally by Old Crow Medicine Show, which was then covered by American country singer Darius Rucker and fellow British singer Nathan Carter.

== Personnel ==
Credits adapted from the album's listing.

- Nathan Evans – vocals, associated performer
- Saltwives – production; engineering; studio personnel
- Alex Oriet – composer/songwriter/studio personnel
- David Phelan – composer/songwriter/studio personnel
- Samuel Brannan – composer/songwriter/studio personnel
- Tom Hollings – composer/songwriter/studio personnel
- William Graydon – composer/songwriter/studio personnel
- Mike Hillier – mastering engineer/studio personnel
- James F. Reynolds – mixing engineer/studio personnel

== Commercial performance ==
Weekly charts
Chart	Peak position	Notes
German Albums Chart	12	18 weeks on chart.
Swiss Albums Chart	30	6 weeks on chart.
UK Album Downloads Chart	25	First chart appearance 17 November 2022.
