= Arabella (Nathan Evans and Saint Phnx song) =

Single by Nathan Evans and Saint Phnx

from the album Angels' Share
- Released: 27 June 2025
- Recorded: 2025
- Genre: Folk pop
- Length: 2:15
- Label: Better Now Records
- Songwriters: Alan Jukes, Lewis Gardiner, Nathan Evans, Stephen Jukes
- Producers: Kevin Burleigh, Lewis Gardiner

Nathan Evans singles chronology
| "Old Man's Grace" (2025) | "Arabella" (2025) | "Cotton Eye Joe" (2025) |

"Arabella" is a song by Scottish singer Nathan Evans and Scottish alternative pop duo Saint Phnx. Released on 27 June 2025 through Better Now Records, it served as the lead single from the collaborative album Angels' Share (2026).

== Background and release ==
The song was written by Alan Jukes, Lewis Gardiner, Nathan Evans and Stephen Jukes, and produced by Kevin Burleigh and Lewis Gardiner. According to Evans, the song tells the story of a brief summer romance centred on a woman named Arabella, describing it as "a very short summer love" that leaves a lasting memory despite its fleeting nature.

Musically, "Arabella" combines contemporary folk-pop with pop-rock production, continuing the collaborative style established by Evans and Saint PHNX in their previous releases. "Arabella" was released digitally on 27 June 2025 by Better Now Records. An official music video directed by Olivia Rudnitzky premiered alongside the single. Critical reception towards the song following release was positive, with Maximum Volume Music describing the song as "catchy as hell", whilst the Scottish Music Network claiming the song requires "no introduction", describing it as "catchy, addictive, and practically impossible to sit still while listening".

== Chart performance ==
Whilst the single missed the official UK Singles Charts, it did peak at number 89 on the Official Singles Chart Update, number 17 on the Official Singles Sales Chart, and number 15 on the Official Singles Downloads Chart.

== Charts ==
Weekly chart performance for Arabella
| Chart (2025) | Peak position |
|---|---|
| UK Singles Sales (OCC) | 17 |
| UK Singles Downloads (OCC) | 15 |

== Personnel ==
- Nathan Evans – vocals, songwriter
- Saint Phnx – featured artists
- Alan Jukes – songwriter
- Lewis Gardiner – songwriter, producer
- Stephen Jukes – songwriter
- Kevin Burleigh – producer

== Release history ==
| Region | Date | Format | Label |
|---|---|---|---|
| Various | 27 June 2025 | Digital download, streaming | Better Now Records |
