= Santiano (song) =

1961 song by Hugues Aufray

Single by Hugues Aufray
- Released: 1961
- Genre: Pop
- Songwriters: Jacques Plante, Dave Fisher

"Santiano" is a 1961 song, inspired by the sea shanty "Santianna", which uses the same tune. The song tells of a ship from Saint Malo bound to San Francisco, which is described as a place of great wealth. The French-language version was popularized first in the 1960s by Hugues Aufray.

== Original version ==
In the early 1960s, the song was recorded in French by artist Hugues Aufray. It is by far the most well-known shanty in France and was released in 1961. The song's French lyrics were composed by the French writer Jacques Plante. The song was included on Aufray's 2007 compilation Les 50 plus belles chansons.

== Star Academy France ==
"Santiano"

Single by Star Academy 5

from the album Les Meilleurs Moments
- B-side: "Instrumental"
- Released: November 11, 2005
- Recorded: France, 2005
- Genre: Pop
- Length: 2:39
- Label: Mercury, Universal Music
- Songwriters: Hugues Aufray; Jacques Plante; Dave Fisher

Star Academy 5 singles chronology
| "Je ne suis pas un héros" (2005) | "Santiano" (2005) | "À bicyclette" (2005) |

In 2005, the song was covered by Star Academy 5 on the album Les Meilleurs Moments on which it features as the first track. Released on November 11, 2005 as the second single from the album, it achieved great success in France, where it topped the chart, as well as in Belgium (Wallonia). As of July 2014, it is the 87th best-selling single of the 21st century in France, with 325,000 units sold.

=== Track listings ===
CD single

1. "Santiano" — 2:39
2. "Santiano" (instrumental) — 2:39

Digital download

1. "Santiano" — 2:39

=== Certifications and sales ===
| Country | Certification | Date | Sales certified | Physical sales |
|---|---|---|---|---|
| France | — | — | — | 323,695 (272,067 in 2005 + 51,628 in 2006) |

=== Charts ===
| Chart (2005–2006) | Peak position |
|---|---|
| Belgian (Wallonia) Singles Chart | 2 |
| Eurochart Hot 100 | 4 |
| French SNEP Singles Chart | 1 |
| Swiss Singles Chart | 18 |

| End of year chart (2005) | Position |
|---|---|
| Belgian (Wallonia) Singles Chart | 30 |
| French Singles Chart | 15 |
| End of year chart (2006) | Position |
| French Singles Chart | 94 |

== Other versions ==
The Kingston Trio performed a cover of the song in 1958, under the title "Santy Anno”. This was the first recorded version with English lyrics, and tells a similar story about a California-bound ship departing from Liverpool.

In 1961, American folk band The Highwaymen recorded their rendition of the English-language “Santiano".

"Santiano" was covered by Laurent Voulzy in 2006. It features as 17th track on his studio album La Septième Vague.

The "Oktoberklub", a folk-band from the GDR covered the song with unrelated lyrics under the title Da sind wir aber immer noch ("We're still here"), a pro-communist fight-song.

In 2012, German band Santiano, named after Aufray's song, released another cover under the same title and with the same tune as the starting track of their first album. This version lives up to Aufray's appraisal of sailing, with mostly new lyrics.

In 2014, Belgian HandsUp producer DJ THT made a cover of "Santiano", featuring the vocals of Angel Lyne and released on Big Beef, a division of Tough Stuff Music.

In April 2021, British folk band The Longest Johns released a cover of “Santiano”, performed in collaboration with French neofolk band SKÁLD. This version is sung in both French and English, with parts of the English lyrics also being from Leave Her Johnny.

In 2022, the German band Santiano released an English version of their 2012 cover, featuring singer and songwriter Nathan Evans.
