= The Albany Shantymen =

Western Australian vocal group

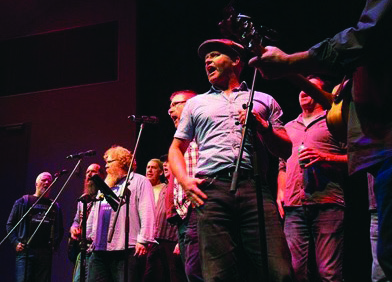
- The Albany Shantymen performing in 2020

Background information
- Origin: Albany, Western Australia
- Genres: Sea shanties, Folk music
- Years active: 2016–present
- Website: albanyshantymen.com

The Albany Shantymen are an Australian vocal group from Albany, Western Australia.

They currently consist of 15 members and perform primarily sea shanties and folk music in the English tradition, as well as composing and recording their own music. They came to the attention of media for their rendition of the 19th century folk song "Wellerman", as the song was popularized on the video sharing social network service TikTok in early 2021 by singer Nathan Evans.

== Career ==
Gary "Grizz" Greenwald arrived from the UK to the port town of Albany and, having previously sang with the Sheringham Shantymen, was surprised to find there was no similar group locally.

As a direct result of this in 2016 Greenwald founded The Albany Shantymen, "I came here looking for a group and realised there wasn’t one so I basically preyed on people when they were drunk enough to say ‘yes’ ".

The group sing regularly at local venues in Albany and events such as welcoming cruise ships visitors into port and regional tours. They support the Albany Community Hospice with proceeds of sales of their CD’s and other fundraising methods.

In 2019, the group were instrumental in the formation of the first Shanty Festival held in Australia which was titled the International Folk ’n’ Shanty Festival. The event was held over 3 days to great success. The festival was headlined by renowned UK group Kimber’s Men. They were joined by 13 other groups from Australia and internationally.

The group have been regular performers at the Fairbridge Festival held in Pinjarra.

Influenced by the Act Belong Commit philosophy they support others to form their own groups by way of workshops.

In November 2020 a performance by the group was captured for a feature film recorded partly in Albany. The regional premier of the film Edward and Isabella was held in Albany in April 2022.

== Recordings ==
The group has self-released three albums Old rope and wet canvas (2017), Are you with me lads? (2020) and Men of the Cheynes (2020)

These were recorded during sessions at the historic Albany Convict Gaol.

== TikTok viral trend ==
On 27 December 2020, Scottish musician and TikTok user Nathan Evans uploaded a video of himself singing the sea shanty 'Soon May the Wellerman Come', which quickly went viral. Others sang their own version, or added their own contribution to the video from Evans. The trend sparked a huge interest in sea shanties, with hundreds of thousands of people discovering The Albany Shantymen's recording of "Wellerman", originally released on their 2020 album Are You With Me Lads? The song has been streamed on Spotify over 553,682 times (as of 23 March 2021).

In the Rolling Stone article discussing his success Evans cited the Albany Shantymen version of the song as inspiration.

== Discography ==
- Old rope and wet canvas (2017)
- Are you with me lads? (2020)
- Men of the Cheynes (2020)
