= El Pony Pisador =

Musical group

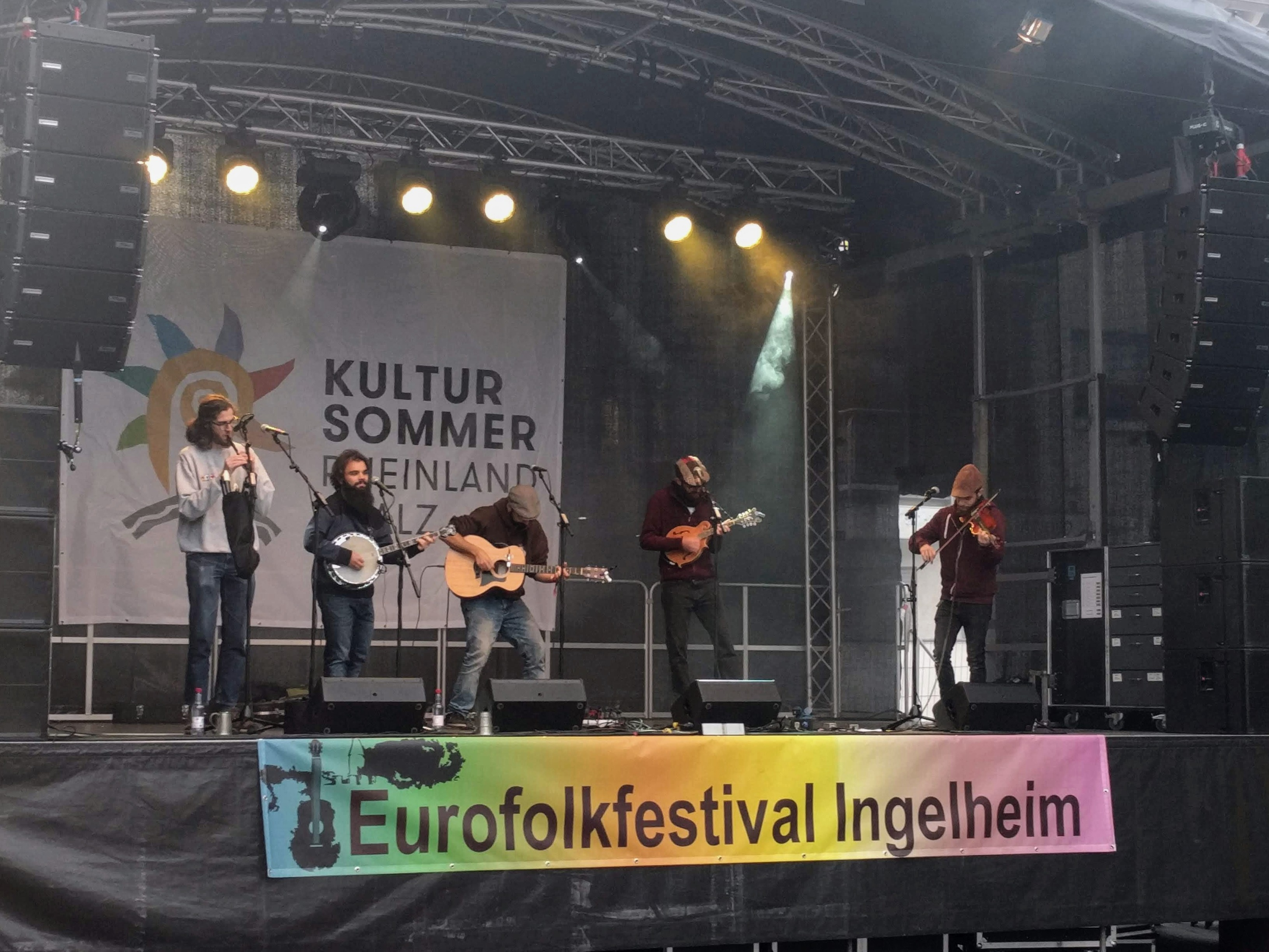

Background information
- Origin: Barcelona, Catalonia
- Years active: 2014–present
- Members: Ramon Anglada; Guillem Codern; Miquel Pérez; Martí Selga; Adrià Vila
- Website: elponypisador.com

El Pony Pisador is a musical group from Barcelona that mixes various styles of folk and traditional music from around the world, including Celtic music, sea songs (sea shanties and habaneras), bluegrass, tarantella and yodel. The band's name refers to the J.R.R. Tolkien's The Lord of the Rings inn The Prancing Pony, called «El Pony Pisador» in the Catalan translation.

Their repertoire includes their own versions and themes. In addition to Catalonia, they have performed in several European countries, the United States and Canada. They also performed at the Albany Folk and Shanty Festival, In Western Australia in September 2023.

The origins of the band date back to 2013, when Adrià Vila and Ramon Anglada decided to form an Irish music group inspired by groups such as Flogging Molly, Dropkick Murphys, The Dubliners or The Clancy Brothers. With the progressive incorporation of the other members, the group was consolidated with its eclectic and festive style, performing music mainly with traditional instruments and filled with humorous references from tavern culture and the world of pirates, fantastic literature and comics.

In 2016 they presented their first album, Yarr's y Trons! (self-published and self-produced) in which they collect songs from diverse musical traditions, from Ireland to Asia Minor. The group's first video clip, "Tot és part de ser un pirata", one of their most famous songs, is from this album. The promotional tour took them to perform at folk music festivals all over Catalonia and to participate in various international folk and sea shanties festivals with performances at the Eurofolk Festival (Germany), the Harwich Shanty Festival and the Falmouth Sea Shanty ( United Kingdom), the Rotterdam Shany Fest or the International Maritime Music of the Corte Ship Celebration (Michigan, United States), among others.

At the end of 2019 they published a second album titled Matricular una galera, this time incorporating sounds typical of swing, habaneras, Bulgarian dances, sea shanties, Tuvan throat singing and even heavy metal. A few weeks before its public launch, the group premiered the video clip for the song "La confraria del Menhir." This song and the album's title are a tribute to the Asterix comics created by Uderzo and Goscinny. Two other video clips from the album, "Lime Scurvy" and "Santianna", were recorded in the occupied mansion of the House Buenos Aires in Barcelona.

In January 2020 they were included among the groups nominated for the 2020 Enderrock Awards for best new artist, best folk album and best folk song of 2019, being finalists in the last category. In March of the same year, they offered a live concert via streaming during the lockdown in the midst of the crisis of the COVID-19 pandemic.

On January 25, 2021, they released the cover of their third album, JAJA Salu2, through their social networks. Three days later, on January 28, 2021, the first song of the disc in single format, La Noble Vila de Su, was released. On February 11, 2021, they released the full album that contains, among others, the track entitled La Balada de Nils Olav, composed live for streaming on July 30, 2020.

In 2023 they released The Longest Pony, a collaborative studio album with the Bristol band The Longest Johns.

In 2024 they published Ocells (birds), an album sung entirely in Catalan and where the theme of all the songs revolves around birds.

== Members ==
- Ramon Anglada — vocals, guitar, accordion
- Guillem Codern — vocals, banjo, harmonica, Tuvan throat singing
- Miquel Pérez — vocals, fiddle, percussions
- Martí Selga — vocals, recorder, whistle, bass
- Adrià Vila — vocals, mandolin, bodhrán, spoons, yodeling

== Discography ==
Studio albums

- Yarr's i Trons! (2016)
- Matricular una Galera (2019)
- JAJA Salu2 (2021)
- It's never too late for sea shanties (2021)
- The Longest Pony (with The Longest Johns) (2023)
- Ocells (2024)

== See also ==
- The Longest Johns
