= Told You So (Nathan Evans song) =

2021 song by Nathan Evans and Digital Farm Animals

Single by Nathan Evans
- Released: 25 June 2021
- Genre: Folk-pop; dance-pop
- Length: 3:14
- Label: Polydor; UMG
- Songwriters: Nathan Evans; Alan Jukes; Ross Hamilton; Stephen Jukes; Nick Gale
- Producers: Ross Hamilton; Digital Farm Animals

Nathan Evans singles chronology
| "Wellerman" (2021) | "Told You So" (2021) | "Ring Ding (A Scotsman's Story)" (2021) |

Digital Farm Animals singles chronology
| "Last Night" (2021) | "Told You So" (Digital Farm Animals remix) (2021) |

Alternative cover
- "Told You So" (Digital Farm Animals remix)

Music videos
- "Told You So" on YouTube
- "Told You So" (Digital Farm Animals remix) on YouTube

"Told You So" is a song by Scottish singer Nathan Evans. Following on from "Wellerman", two versions of the song, including a remix by British songwriter and producer Digital Farm Animals, were released for digital download and streaming by Polydor and UMG on 25 June 2021, alongside accompanying music videos.

== Track listings ==
Digital download
| No. | Title | Length |
|---|---|---|
| 1. | "Told You So" | 3:14 |

Digital download – Digital Farm Animals remix
| No. | Title | Length |
|---|---|---|
| 1. | "Told You So" (Digital Farm Animals remix) | 2:19 |

== Music video ==
The accompanying official video was directed by Michael Baldwin and was released on 25 June 2021, along with the release of the song. In the official video, Evans appears in Seaford, East Sussex, Newhaven, Edinburgh, Brighton, Haywards Heath, Crawley, City of London, West Wickham and Crystal Palace, London.

== Credits and personnel ==
- Buzz Killer – producer, bass, drum programming, guitar, mandolin, background vocalist
- Digital Farm Animals – producer, studio personnel, remixer, associated performer, music production
- Nathan Evans – associated performer, vocals, background vocalist, composer lyricist
- Alan Jukes – associated performer, background vocalist, composer lyricist
- Luke Taylor – associated performer, background vocalist
- Stephen Jukes – associated performer, background vocalist, composer lyricist
- Jamie McGrory – studio personnel
- Geoff Swan – studio personnel, mixer
- Niko Battistini – studio personnel, assistant mixer
- Mike Hillier – studio personnel, mastering engineer
- Ross Hamilton – composer lyricist
- Nick Gale – associated performer, bass, mandolin, composer lyricist

== Charts ==
Chart performance for "Told You So"
| Chart (2021) | Peak position |
|---|---|
| Belgium (Ultratop 50 Flanders) | 23 |
| Czech Republic Airplay (ČNS IFPI) | 22 |
| Poland (Polish Airplay Top 100) | 9 |

== Release history ==
Release history and formats for "Told You So"
| Region | Date | Format(s) | Version | Label(s) | Ref. |
|---|---|---|---|---|---|
| Various | 25 June 2021 | Digital download; streaming | Original | Polydor; Universal Music Group | |
| Various | 25 June 2021 | Digital download; streaming | Digital Farm Animals remix | Polydor; Universal Music Group | |
