= Angels' Share (album) =

Studio album by Nathan Evans and Saint Phnx
- Released: 16 January 2026
- Recorded: 2024–2025
- Genres: Folk pop, Scottish folk, folk rock
- Length: 31:35
- Labels: Better Now, Universal Music

Nathan Evans and Saint Phnx chronology
| 1994 (2024) | Angels' Share (2026) |

Angels' Share is a collaborative studio album by Scottish singer Nathan Evans and Scottish alternative rock duo Saint Phnx. It was released on 16 January 2026 through Better Now Records and Universal Music. The album combines traditional Scottish folk influences with contemporary pop and rock production, featuring themes of friendship, home, love, grief, and Scottish identity. The album was supported by its lead single, "Arabella", with subsequent single releases "Cotton Eye Joe", "Milarrochy Bay", "The Wedding", "Happy Place" and the title track "Angels' Share".

== Background ==
In 2025, both Evans and Saint Phnx released the single "Arabella", which, despite debuting at number eighty-nine on the mid–week singles charts update in the United Kingdom, missed the UK Top 100 Singles Charts. It did, however, debut at numbers seventeen and fifteen on the Singles Sales Charts and Singles Downloads Charts in the United Kingdom, respectively, and it was this success which resulted in both Evans and Saint Phnx collaborating further to produce an entire full–length studio album. Evans and the duo developed Angels' Share as their first full-length collaborative project, and according to Universal Music, the record was inspired by the friendship between the artists and explores themes including family, belonging, remembrance, healing and Scotland's cultural heritage. Musically, the album blends traditional Scottish folk instrumentation, acoustic arrangements and storytelling with modern pop hooks and rock production.

== Release ==
Angels' Share was released digitally, on CD and on vinyl on 16 January 2026 by Better Now Records and Universal Music. Critical reception for the album was favourable, with Lauren Page writing for Scottish Music Network, describing the album as "an absolute winner", praising its emotional songwriting, Scottish identity and storytelling. She highlighted the title track, "Happy Place," and "All Roads" among the album's strongest moments, while describing the record as a successful fusion of Nathan Evans' folk style with Saint Phnx's modern rock influences.

The album was supported by the release of six singles – "Arabella", "Cotton Eye Joe", "Milarrochy Bay" and "Happy Place" which peaked at numbers seventeen, thirty-six, thirteen and sixty-four on the UK Singles Sales Charts respectively, whilst the single "The Wedding" peaked at number ninety-seven on the UK Singles Downloads Charts. Commercially, the album performed strongly following its release, particularly in their native Scotland, where it debuted atop the Scottish Albums Charts, and in the United Kingdom where it debuted at number four, earning Evans his first top five entry on the UK Albums Charts. Additionally, it reached number sixty-nine in Germany.

== Track listing ==
| No. | Title | Length |
|---|---|---|
| 1. | "Angels' Share" | 2:40 |
| 2. | "Arabella" | 2:17 |
| 3. | "Milarrochy Bay" | 2:24 |
| 4. | "Happy Place" | 3:02 |
| 5. | "Islay" | 2:43 |
| 6. | "The Tide" | 2:17 |
| 7. | "Cotton Eye Joe" | 2:45 |
| 8. | "The Wedding" | 2:13 |
| 9. | "Drinking Song" | 2:56 |
| 10. | "Blood and Bone" | 3:02 |
| 11. | "All Roads" | 3:07 |
| 12. | "Last Orders" | 2:09 |
| Total length: | | 31:35 |

== Charts ==
Weekly chart performance for Angels' Share
| Chart (2026) | Peak position |
|---|---|
| German Albums (Offizielle Top 100) | 69 |
| Scottish Albums (Official Charts) | 1 |
| UK Albums (Official Charts) | 4 |
| UK Folk Albums (Official Charts) | 1 |

== Release history ==
| Region | Date | Format | Label |
|---|---|---|---|
| Worldwide | 16 January 2026 | Digital download, streaming, CD, LP | Better Now Records, Universal Music |
