= The Longest Johns =

British folk music group

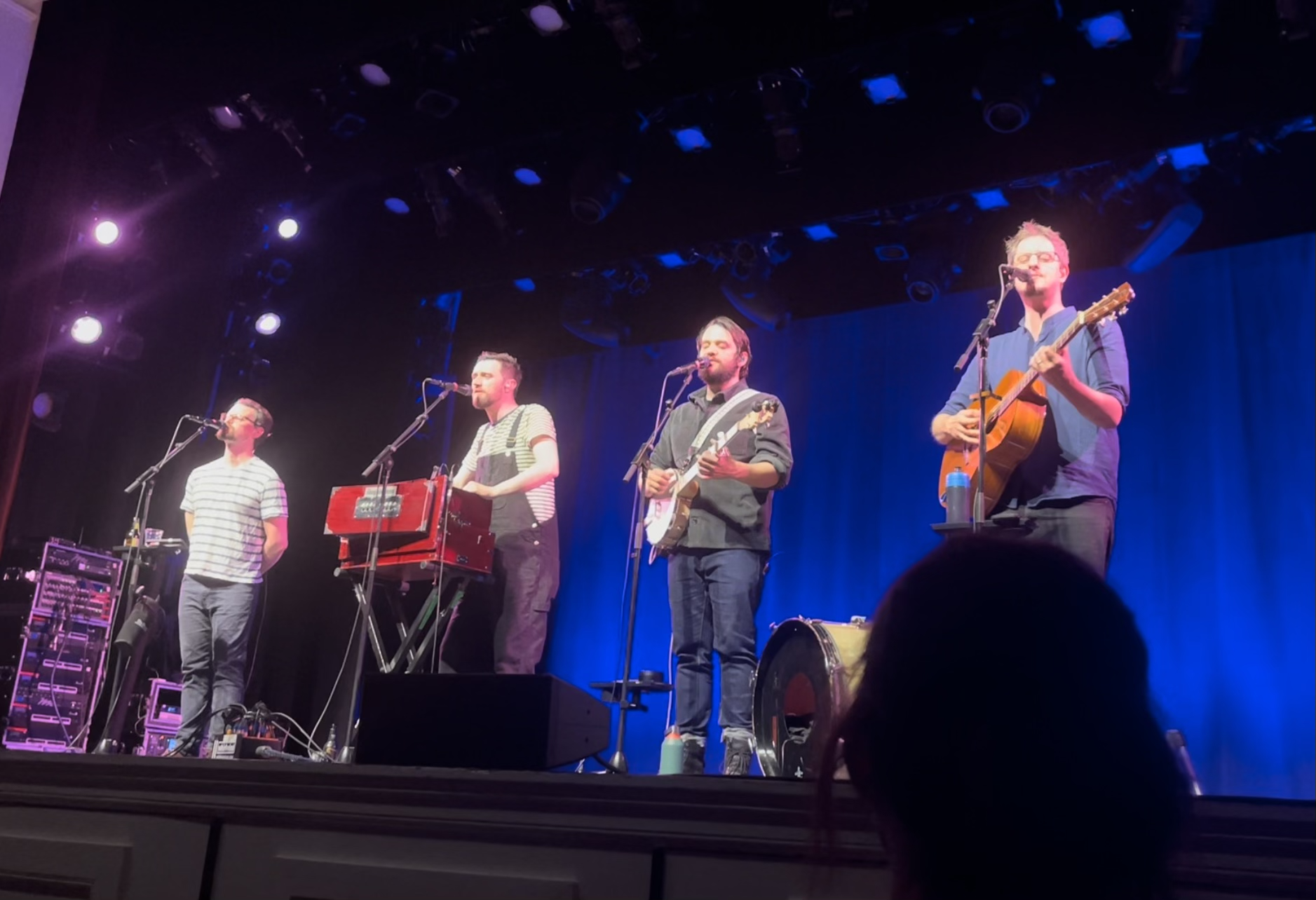
- The Longest Johns performing in 2022

Background information
- Origin: Bristol, England
- Genres: A cappella; folk; Sea shanty
- Years active: 2012–present
- Labels: Decca Records; Jetsam Records
- Members: Andy Yates; Jonathan "JD" Darley; Robbie Sattin
- Past members: Josh Bowker; Anna Cornish; Dave Robinson
- Website: thelongestjohns.com

The Longest Johns are an English folk musical group from Bristol, England, consisting of Andy Yates, Jonathan "JD" Darley, and Robbie Sattin. They are known for performing folk music and sea shanties in the English tradition, and they also compose and record their own music. They gained popularity from their rendition of the folk song "Wellerman", which went viral on TikTok in early 2021.

They released their debut EP, Bones in the Ocean, in 2013, the title track of which is still one of their most popular. Their first full album, Written in Salt, was released in 2016, featuring tracks such as Drunken Sailor, Old Maui and Randy Dandy-O.

In June 2018 they released their second album, Between Wind & Water, which included "Wellerman". This recording, as well as the one used in the bands' Sea of Thieves series "Open Crewsing" would later fuel the sea shanty viral trend, principally on TikTok, in early 2021.

In January 2021, they signed a deal with Decca Records and United Talent Agency. A year later, the group released their first album with Decca, Smoke & Oakum. In 2023, they announced that they had left Decca and ongoing releases would be fully independent; subsequent releases have been under their own Jetsam Records label.

== Career ==
The Longest Johns formed in June 2012 after first singing together at a friend's barbecue. The original line up consisted of Josh Bowker, Andy Yates, Jonathan Darley and Dave Robinson. About a week later, they posted their first video on YouTube, singing "Haul Away Joe".

The band recorded their first EP, Bones in the Ocean in 2013, which was wholly original music. It was released on 27 May 2013. The band released their second EP, Christmas at Sea, later that year, on 2 December 2013.

In 2015, Bowker was unable to perform at the 2015 Falmouth International Sea Shanty Festival due to the birth of his daughter. Robbie Sattin joined the band as a replacement, and the band later announced that he would be officially joining the band.

The band released their first full-length album, Written in Salt, on 18 June 2016. Following this release, and amid the band's heightening popularity, Bowker left the band to focus on running his business.

In April 2016, the band began recording their second studio album. The title of the album was later announced to be Between Wind and Water, and was released on 19 June 2018.

In November 2017, the band announced via Facebook that Anna Cornish would become the first female member of the band, having been singing with them for several months prior.

In October 2019, the band announced that Cornish would be leaving the band to focus on her other band, The Norfolk Broads.

On 10 June 2020 the band released their third studio album, Cures What Ails Ya.

In June 2021, the band recorded their fourth studio album. On 20 October they announced that the title of the album would be Smoke & Oakum, and that it would be released on 21 January 2022.

Since 2021, they've participated in The Yogscast's annual Jingle Jam charity fundraiser, performing a mixture of shanties and cover versions of popular music and Yogscast original music.

On 1 May 2023, the band announced the departure of founding member Dave Robinson.

On 9 February 2024 the band released their fifth studio album, Voyage.

Collection Caught in the Net Vol 1 was released 18 October 2024, a collection of tracks the band had released previously on their YouTube channel.

From March to October 2025 the band released a series of eight EPs which were then combined into album Pieces of Eight, released 7 November 2025.

== Recordings ==
The band has released seven albums and several EPs and other collections: EP Bones in the Ocean (2013), Written in Salt (2016), Between Wind and Water (2018), Cures What Ails Ya (2020), Smoke & Oakum (2022), Voyage (2024), Caught in the Net (2024) and Pieces of Eight (2025).

Between Wind and Water was released on 19 June 2018 by the band through Bandcamp. The album includes 15 tracks with traditional songs and original compositions.

Cures What Ails Ya was released in 2020 by the band and includes a mix of traditional tunes and their band's own compositions. In a review Mike Davies stated the band takes a "irreverent and playful approach to the tradition." Tunes such as "Got No Beard" and "Hoist up the Thing" are humorous in nature. Their original tune "Fire and Flame" tells the story of Halifax Explosion, a 1917 maritime disaster which took place in Halifax, Nova Scotia, Canada.

In 2021, the band released Land Shanties as a partnership with Suzuki which was described as, "the genre-defining Land Shanties album—the soundtrack to the Suzuki Vitara. Capturing all the fun and adventure of the high seas on the highways, Land Shanties is a concept album following one hero's quest to buy almond milk for his sweetheart."

The band collaborated with shanty punk band Skinny Lister on their 2021 single "Damn the Amsterdam".

== TikTok viral trend ==
The Longest Johns found a surge in fame after a sea shanty video went viral on TikTok. The trend started back in August 2019 when The Longest Johns released a YouTube video of them singing the song "Wellerman" as the first episode of their Sea of Thieves series, Open Crewsing. This video was shared around on many online platforms including Reddit, iFunny and Tumblr amassing many millions of views. The song then found a strong following on TikTok, with many users creating memes and popularising the song on the platform. A lot of the success of the song has been attributed to Scottish musician and TikTok user Nathan Evans who uploaded a video of himself singing the maritime song, which quickly went viral with the help of other users adding their own contributions through the duet feature on the app.

However, the spark that ignited the worldwide phenomenon happened when two brothers released a TikTok of them listening to The Longest Johns version of the song in a car. This video goes through the emotion of initially not liking the song, but slowly becoming enraptured by it and wanting to join in with the singing. The trend sparked a huge interest in sea shanties (despite Wellerman not actually being a sea shanty) with millions of people discovering The Longest Johns' recording of Wellerman, originally released on their 2018 album Between Wind and Water. The song has been streamed on Spotify over 70 million times (as of 9 May 2025).

== Members ==
=== Current ===
- Andy Yates (2012–present)
- Jonathan Darley (2012–present)
- Robbie Sattin (2015–present)

=== Former ===
- Joshua Bowker (2012–2016)
- Dave Robinson (2012–2023)
- Anna Cornish (2017–2019)

== Discography ==
=== Studio albums ===
Title	Details
Written in Salt	Released: 17 June 2016; Label: Self-released; Format: Digital download, CD, vinyl
Between Wind and Water	Released: 7 June 2018; Label: Self-released; Format: Digital download, CD, vinyl
Cures What Ails Ya	Released: 10 June 2020; Label: Self-released; Format: Digital download, CD, vinyl
Land Shanties	Released: 1 September 2021; Label: Decca; Format: Digital download
Commodore 1864	Released: 7 December 2021; Label: Self-released; Format: Digital download, Cassette
Smoke & Oakum	Released: 28 January 2022; Label: Decca; Format: Digital download, CD, vinyl, cassette
Made of Ale Sessions	Released: 15 October 2022; Label: Self-released; Format: Digital download, CD
The Longest Pony (with El Pony Pisador)	Released: 21 March 2023; Format: Digital download, CD
Voyage	Released: 9 February 2024; Label: Self-released; Format: Digital download, CD, vinyl, cassette
Caught in the Net	Released: 18 October 2024; Label: Self-released; Format: Digital download, CD
Pieces of Eight	Released: 7 November 2025; Label: Self-released; Format: Digital download, CD
Ends of the Earth	Released: 1 May 2026; Label: Self-released; Format: Digital download, CD, vinyl, cassette

=== Extended plays ===
Title	Details
Bones in the Ocean	Released: 27 May 2013; Label: Self-released; Format: Digital download, CD
Christmas at Sea	Released: 2 December 2013; Label: Self-released; Format: Digital download, CD
Santiano	Released: 22 April 2021; Label: Decca Records; Format: Digital download
C-Sides	Released: 30 May 2023; Label: Self-released; Format: Digital download

=== Singles ===
Title	Year	Peak chart positions	Album
Title	Year	UK	Album
"Drunken Sailor"	2013	—	Written in Salt
"Christmas at Sea"	2013	—	Non-album singles
"Fairytale of New York"	2019	—	Non-album singles
"(See You All) When Lockdown Ends"	2020	—	Non-album singles
"Wellerman"	2021	37	Between Wind and Water
"Hard Times Come Again No More"	2021	—	Smoke & Oakum
"The Mary Ellen Carter"	2021	—	Smoke & Oakum
"The Workers Song" (feat. Seth Lakeman)	2021	—	Smoke & Oakum
"Scrooge"	2021	—	Non-album single
"Hog Eye Man"	2022	—	Smoke & Oakum
"It's Hard to Be a Shantyman (On Christmas)"	2022	—	Non-album single
"All For Me Grog"	2023	—	The Longest Pony
"Diggy Diggy Hole"	2023	—	Non-album single
"Shawneetown"	2024	—	Voyage
"Unison in Harmony"	2025	—	Non-album single
