= Die Amigos =

German schlager band

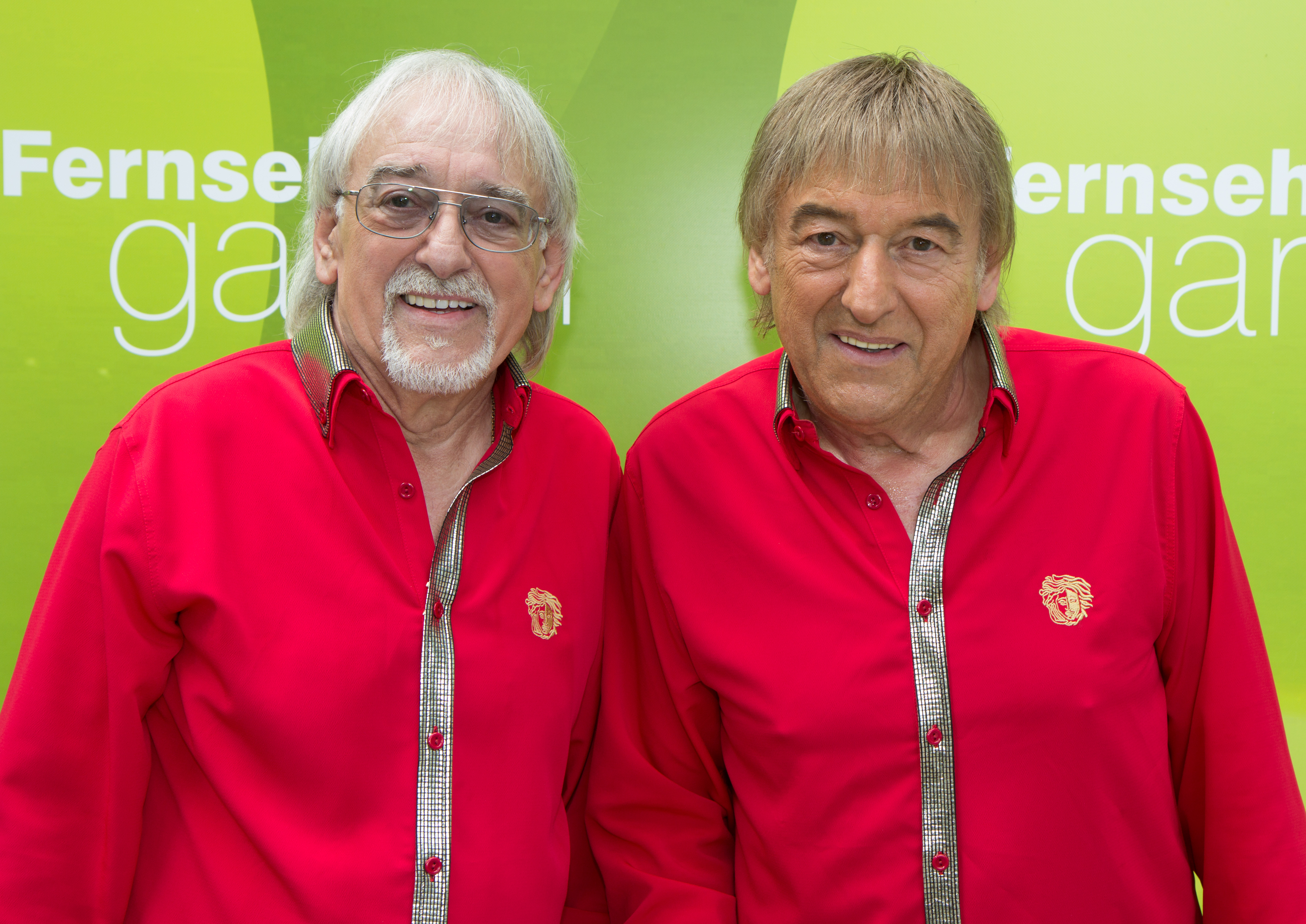
Die Amigos, 2018

Die Amigos is a German music band.

In Germany the band Die Amigos is a popular band of German Schlager songs. Bernd Ulrich (keyboard and singer), Karl-Heinz Ulrich (singer) and Daniela Alfinito (singer since 2000) are members of the band. The band was founded in year 1970.

== Discography ==
=== Albums ===
Year	Title	Peak chart positions				Sales figures
Year	Title	GER	AUT	DEN	SWI	Sales figures
1989	Liebe und Sehnsucht	—	—	—	—	
1990	Alles Liebe, alles Gute	—	—	—	—	
1993	Schenk mir bitte diese Nacht	—	—	—	—	
1994	Sehnsucht in ihrem Herzen	—	—	—	—	
1996	Sterne von Santa Monica	—	—	—	—	
2000	Zwischen Liebe und Wahnsinn	—	—	—	—	
2002	Herz an Herz	—	—	—	—	
2006	…durchs Feuer	66	25	—	—	Sales: + 110,000
2006	Ich steh' wieder auf	58	48	—	—	Sales: + 100,000
2006	Weihnachten daheim	56	17	—	—	Sales: + 130,000
2007	Der helle Wahnsinn	1	2	—	8	Sales: + 335,000
2008	Es lebe die Freundschaft (joint with Die Ladiner)	55	7	—	—	Sales: + 10,000
2008	Ein Tag im Paradies	7	3	—	13	Sales: + 235,000
2009	Zwei Herzen aus Gold	96	—	—	—	Sales: + 10,000
2009	Sehnsucht, die wie Feuer brennt	5	2	—	18	Sales: + 220,000
2010	Weißt du, was du für mich bist?	2	1	—	3	Sales: + 220,000
2011	Mein Himmel auf Erden	1	1	—	4	Sales: + 120,000
2012	Bis ans Ende der Zeit	1	1	—	2	Sales: + 200,000
2012	Weihnachten mit den Amigos	15	8	—	53	
2013	Im Herzen jung	1	1	—	5	
2014	Unvergessene Schlager	5	3	—	6	
2014	Sommerträume	1	1	19	1	
2015	Santiago Blue	1	1	—	1	
2015	Unsere 20 schönsten Weihnachtslieder	—	58	—	—	
2016	Wie ein Feuerwerk	1	1	—	1	
2017	Zauberland	1	2	—	1	
2018	110 Karat	1	1	—	1	
2019	Best of Fox – Das Tanzalbum	8	21	—	13	
2019	Die 30 schönsten Sommerschlager	—	72	—	—	
2019	Babylon	1	2	—	1	
2019	Unsere Lieder, unser Leben	—	63	—	—	
2020	50 Jahre – 50 Hits	—	70	—	—	
2020	50 Jahre: Unsere Schlager von damals	1	1	—	3	
2020	Tausend Träume	1	1	—	1	
2021	Freiheit	1	1	—	1	
2022	Liebe siegt	1	1	—	2	
2022	Weihnachten Live	57	—	—	—	
2023	Best Of	1	2	—	8	
2023	Atlantis wird leben	2	2	—	2	
2024	Stimmen der Nacht	1	1	—	3	
2025	Lebe jetzt	1	1	—	7	
2026	Cleopatra	2	2	—	—	

== Song books ==
(German language)

- 2006: Das Beste der Amigos Songbuch
- 2006: Melodien der Herzen Songbuch
- 2006: Ihre großen Erfolge Songbuch
- 2006: Weihnachten daheim Songbuch
- 2007: Der helle Wahnsinn Songbuch
- 2008: Ein Tag im Paradies Songbuch
- 2008: CD- & Buch-Kombination
- 2009: Sehnsucht, die wie Feuer brennt Songbuch

== Awards ==
- 2011: Echo
- 2009 and 2010: Krone der Volksmusik
