= Daniela Alfinito =

German schlager singer

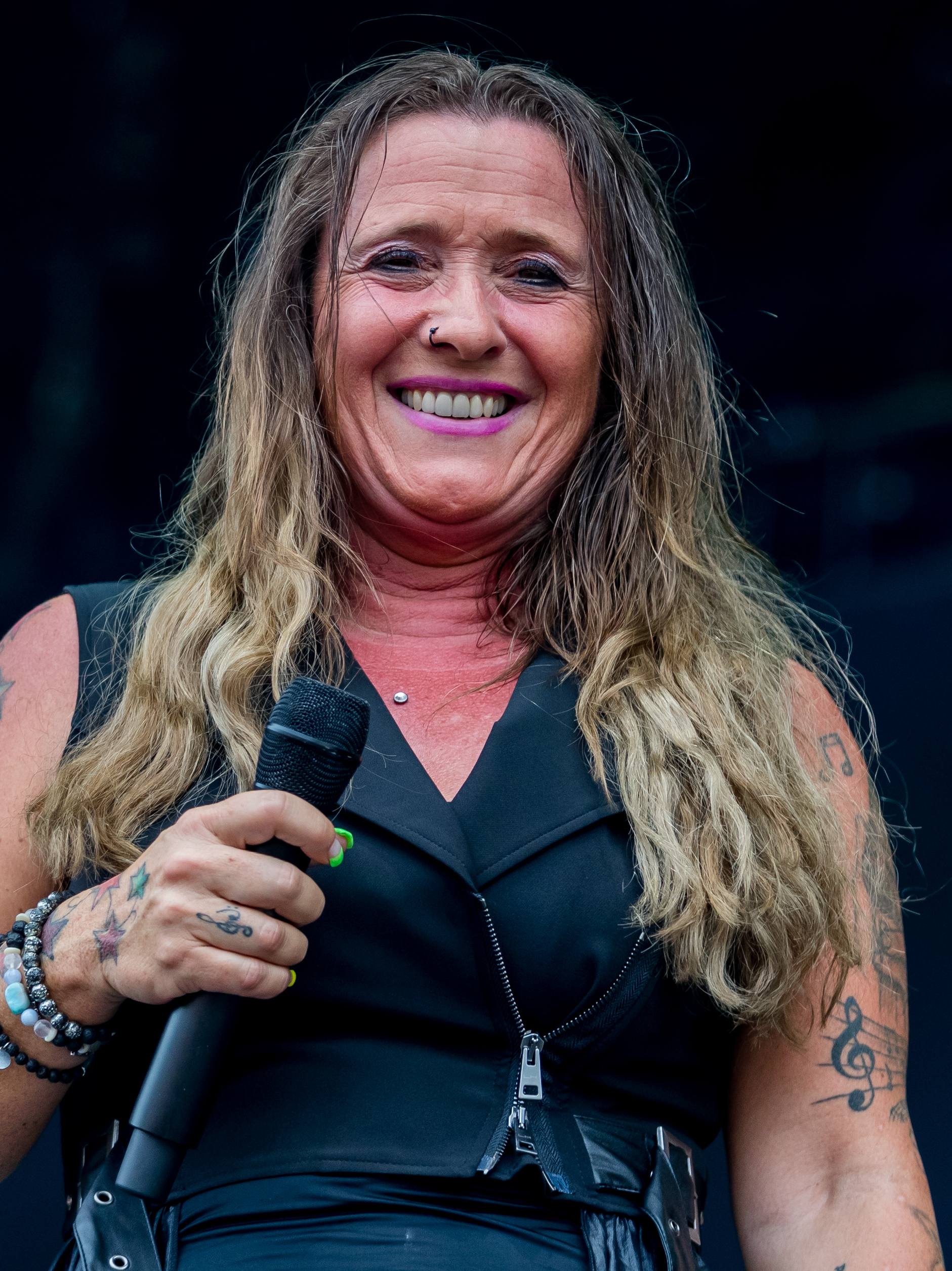
- Alfinito performing in 2023

Background information
- Birth name: Daniela Ulrich
- Born: 11 March 1971 (age 54); Villingen (now part of Hungen), Hesse, West Germany
- Origin: Hesse, Germany
- Genres: Schlager
- Occupation: Singer
- Years active: 2000–present
- Labels: Telamo

Daniela Alfinito (née Ulrich; born 11 March 1971) is a German schlager singer from Hesse, Germany. She achieved first chart success with her 2015 album Ein bisschen sterben and reached number one in Germany with her 2019 and 2020 albums Du warst jede Träne wert and Liebes-Tattoo.

== Life and career ==
Alfinito was born as the daughter of Die Amigos' singer Bernd Ulrich in 1971 in Villingen, now a part of Hungen, in Hesse, West Germany. After finishing school she pursued a career as a geriatric nurse. She first became musically active at the age of seven, regularly joining her father and uncle on stage. She became more engaged in performing with the duo in 2000. Ever since 2003, she has accompanied them during concerts and other performances. In the same year, she started releasing music under her first name "Daniela". The singer received support from her father and uncle who helped her write and produce her 2003 debut album Ich vermisse dich nicht.... From 2008 to 2012, she released three more studio albums Bahnhof der Sehnsucht, Wahnsinn and Komm und tanz mit mir, all of which achieved little to no mainstream success. Only her 2015 release Ein bisschen sterben garnered success in Germany, Austria and Switzerland. While replicating the initial success with the 2017 follow-up release Sag mir wo bist du, she finally reached number one in Germany in January 2019 with the album Du warst jede Träne wert. The 2020 album Liebes-Tattoo became her second number-one album there and marked the first time she went number one in Austria and Switzerland.

In addition to recording music and touring, she keeps working as a geriatric nurse to this day. Alfinito married in 1995 and gave birth to a son in 1997.

== Discography ==
=== Studio albums ===
Title	Details	Peak chart positions		
Title	Details	GER	AUT	SWI
Ich vermisse Dich nicht …	Released: 2003; Label: Self-released; Formats: CD, digital download	—	—	—
Bahnhof der Sehnsucht	Released: 14 November 2008; Label: VM Records; Formats: CD, digital download, streaming	—	—	—
Wahnsinn	Released: 19 March 2010; Label: Amigos; Formats: CD, digital download, streaming	—	—	—
Komm und tanz mit mir	Released: 8 June 2012; Label: MCP Sound, Media GmbH; Formats: CD, digital download, streaming	—	—	—
Ein bisschen sterben	Released: 29 May 2015; Label: Telamo; Formats: CD, digital download, streaming	5	6	28
Sag mir wo bist du	Released: 14 July 2017; Label: Telamo; Formats: CD, digital download, streaming	5	6	21
Du warst jede Träne wert	Released: 4 January 2019; Label: Telamo; Formats: CD, digital download, streaming	1	4	7
Liebes-Tattoo	Released: 3 January 2020; Label: Telamo; Formats: CD, digital download, streaming	1	1	1
Splitter aus Glück	Released: 8 January 2021; Label: Telamo; Formats: CD, digital download, streaming	1	1	1
Löwenmut	Released: 7 January 2022; Label: Telamo; Formats: CD, digital download, streaming	1	1	3
Frei und grenzenlos	Released: 6 January 2023; Label: Telamo; Formats: CD, digital download, streaming	1	1	2
Einfach echt	Released: 5 January 2024; Label: Telamo; Formats: CD, digital download, streaming	2	1	2

=== Compilation albums ===
Title	Details	Peak chart positions		
Title	Details	GER	AUT	SWI
Das Beste	Released: 19 August 2016; Label: Telamo; Formats: CD, digital download, streaming	8	18	43
Schlager zum Verlieben	Released: 27 July 2018; Label: Telamo; Formats: CD, digital download, streaming	31	48	63
Juwelen & Glanzstücke	Released: 15 February 2019; Label: Telamo; Formats: CD, digital download, streaming	—	60	—
Die große Jubiläums-Edition	Released: 29 May 2020; Label: Telamo; Formats: CD, digital download, streaming	8	12	49
