= 1994 (Nathan Evans album) =

Studio album by Nathan Evans
- Released: 8 November 2024
- Length: 35:50
- Labels: Better Now; EMI; Universal
- Producers: James Earp; Lewis Gardiner; Ross Hamilton

Nathan Evans chronology
Wellerman – The Album (2022)	1994 (2024)	Angels' Share (2026)

1994 is the second album by the Scottish singer-songwriter Nathan Evans, released on 8 November 2024 through Better Now Records, EMI Records, and Universal Music. The album's lead single, "Catch You When You Fall", was released in March 2023. 1994 was further supported by the BPI Silver-certified single "Heather on the Hill".

== Release ==
Commercially, the album debuted atop the albums charts in his native Scotland, and spent a combined total of ten weeks within the Scottish Albums Charts, In the United Kingdom, it debuted and peaked at number twenty–six on the UK Albums Charts, whilst it debuted at number 2 on the UK Folk Albums Charts.

== Track listing ==
The track listing for 1994 is as follows:

Standard track listing
No.	Title	Length
1.	"Bonfire"	2:28
2.	"Flowers in the Water"	2:22
3.	"Driving to Nowhere"	3:05
4.	"Heather on the Hill"	2:19
5.	"I'm A Man" (featuring Foy Vance)	4:36
6.	"Highland Girl"	2:56
7.	"100 Miles"	3:03
8.	"Sweet Mountain Rose"	2:32
9.	"Catch You When You Fall"	3:12
10.	"Perfect Storm"	3:01
11.	"Paper Planes"	3:32
12.	"Days of Our Lives"	2:44
Total length:		35:50

1994 – Deluxe edition
No.	Title	Length
13.	"Old Man's Grace"	2:47
14.	"Island Queen"	2:15
15.	"Banks of Eden Water"	2:05
16.	"Pour Me Up A Drink"	2:29
17.	"Rolling Stone"	2:42
Total length:		48:08

== Personnel ==
The following personnel are credited on the album's inner lining.

=== Performance ===
- Nathan Evans – lead and backing vocals
- Laura Jane Wilkie – fiddle
- James Earp – bass, guitars, keyboards
- Lewis Gardiner – backing vocals
- Saint PHNX – backing vocals
- Alan Jukes – backing vocals
- Stephen Jukes – backing vocals

=== Production ===
- James Earp – producer, recording, drum programming, synthesizer programming
- Lewis Gardiner – producer, mixing
- Ross Hamilton – producer
- Christoph Thiers – mixing engineer
- Adam Lunn – mastering engineer
- Sascha Buehren – mixing, mastering

== Charts ==
Chart performance for 1994
Chart (2024)	Peak position
German Albums (Offizielle Top 100)	34
Scottish Albums (Official Charts)	1
Swiss Albums (Schweizer Hitparade)	65
UK Albums (Official Charts)	26
UK Folk Albums (Official Charts)	2

== Release history ==
Region	Date	Format	Label
Europe	8 November 2024	Digital / CD	Better Now Records · EMI Records · Universal Music
Europe (import CD)	15 November 2024	CD	Universal Import
Worldwide	21 February 2025	Deluxe digital edition	Better Now Records · Universal
