= Wellerman =

New Zealand folk song

"Soon May the Wellerman Come"

Song
- Recorded: 1971
- Genre: Folk

"Soon May the Wellerman Come", also known as "Wellerman" or "The Wellerman", is a folk song in ballad style first published in New Zealand in the 1970s. The "wellermen" were supply ships owned by the Weller brothers, three merchant traders in the 1800s who were amongst the earliest European settlers of the Otago region of New Zealand.

In early 2021, a cover by Scottish singer Nathan Evans became a viral hit on the social media site TikTok, leading to a "social media craze" around sea shanties and maritime songs.

== Historical background ==
Wellerman - U.S. Navy Band (1:52)
U.S. Navy Band Sea Chanters singing "The Wellerman"

Computer-generated rendition of "Wellerman" tune

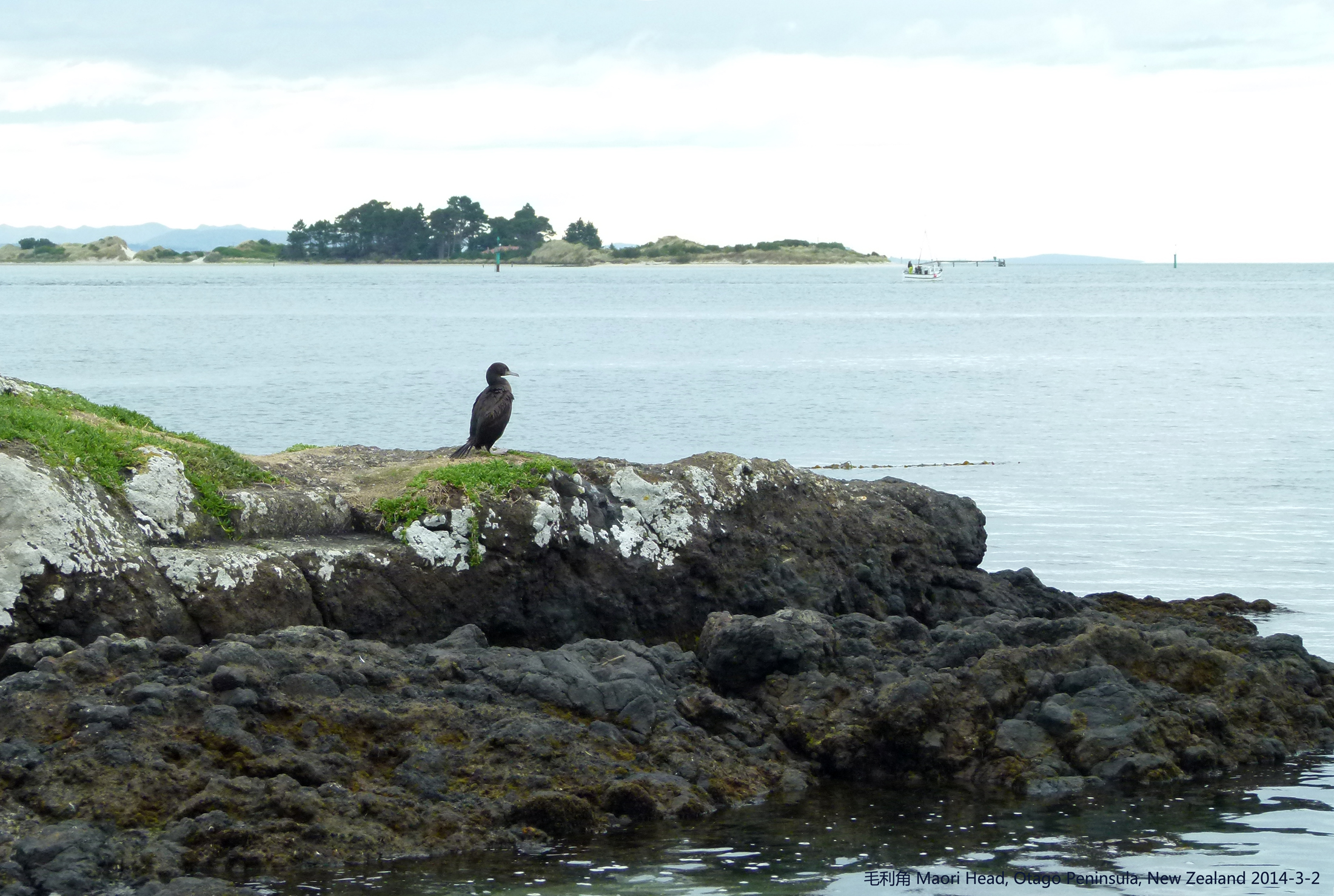
Weller's Rock or Te Umukuri, one of two lookout points for whales (along with Taiaroa Head) used by whalers. Aramoana, across Otago Harbour, is visible in the background. It has been designated as a historic reserve for protection.

The history of whaling in New Zealand stretches from the late eighteenth century to 1965. In 1831, the British-born Weller brothers Edward, George and Joseph, who had emigrated to Sydney in 1829, founded a whaling station at Otago Heads near modern Dunedin in the South Island of New Zealand, seventeen years before Dunedin was established. Speaking at centennial celebrations in 1931, New Zealand's Governor General Lord Bledisloe recalled how the Weller brothers had on their voyage to New Zealand "brought in the 'Lucy Ann' (the Weller brothers' barque) a good deal of rum and a good deal of gunpowder...and some at least were rum characters". Weller brothers initially engaged in whaling on Otago Peninsula in 1831, and from 1833, they sold provisions to whalers in New Zealand from their base at Otakou, which they had named "Otago". Their employees became known as "wellermen".

Unlike whaling in the Atlantic and northern Pacific, whalers in New Zealand practised shore-based whaling which required them to process the whale carcasses on land. At its peak in 1834, the Otakou station was producing 310 tons of whale oil a year and became the centre of a network of seven stations that formed a highly profitable enterprise for the Wellers, employing as many as 85 people at Otago alone. From the Otakou base the Wellers branched out into industries as diverse as "timber, spars, flax, potatoes, dried fish, Māori artefacts, and even tattooed Māori heads which were in keen demand in Sydney".

By 1835, the year that Joseph Weller died in Otago from tuberculosis, the brothers became convinced of the need to abandon the station even as they branched out into massive land purchases in New Zealand. The Weller brothers' success in the whaling industry was fleeting, and they were declared bankrupt in 1840 after failed attempts at large-scale land purchase in New South Wales. The Otakou station closed in 1841, with 10 tons of oils produced. In 1841, the Court of Claims in New South Wales ruled that the Weller brothers' purchases of land in New Zealand were legally invalid, after which the Wellers "slipped unobtrusively out of the pages of New Zealand history".

=== Impact and legacy ===
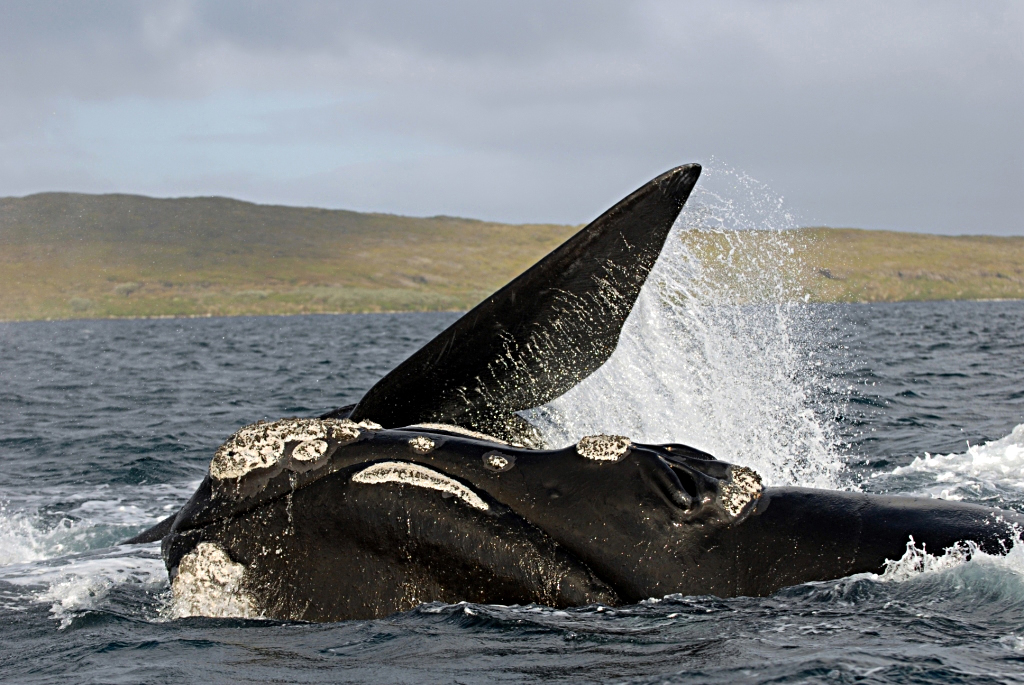
Southern Right Whale, or Tohorā, was the primally targeted species in shore whaling industry in New Zealand, and infrequently appears in Otago waters today.

With the success of the Otakou station, the Weller brothers extended whaling grounds from Akaroa on Banks Peninsula in the north to Stewart Island in the south, with three within Otago Harbour and one in Blueskin Bay, and at least five between Pūrākaunui and Banks Peninsula. Their operations drew attentions from other whalers including Johnny Jones, leading to the expansion of the industry along the east coast of the South Island and establishments of competing stations throughout the Otago region. However, the industry was short-lived in general due to overexploitations causing depletion of local whale stocks and dwindling catches. Additionally, arrivals of whaling ships from Sydney presumably triggered an epidemic in the region.

Industrial whaling in New Zealand continued until the 1960s. Commercial and illegal whaling operations triggered depletions of whale populations and their migrations, especially the southern right whale (Tohorā) and the humpback whale (Paikea). Right whales were named as the "right whales to hunt", and were prioritized targets for their behaviors being slow and coastal and docile, quantities of oils and baleens and whalebones they yield, and their carcasses with high buoyancies.

The whale lookout point Weller's Rock, or Te Umukuri in te reo Māori, was named after the Weller brothers, and has become a protected historic reserve, along with their whaling tools and artifacts being preserved. Historic presences of whales and whaling industry in Otago Harbour have become an influential topic for educational and cultural aspects, such as introductions of whale-based designs on artworks and buildings and the Wellerman sea shanty became a global hit.

== Synopsis ==
The song's lyrics describe a whaling ship called the Billy o' Tea and its hunt for a right whale. The song describes how the ship's crew hope for a "wellerman" to arrive and bring them supplies of luxuries.

"Soon may the Wellerman come
To bring us sugar and tea and rum
One day, when the tonguin' is done
We'll take our leave and go"

— "Wellerman" chorus

The chorus continues with the crew singing of their confidence that the "tonguin'" will be the last step of their plight. Tonguing in this context refers to the practice of cutting strips of whale blubber to render into oil. Subsequent verses detail the captain's determination to bring in the whale in question, even as time passes and the quartet of whaling boats is lost in the fight. In the last verse, the narrator conveys how the Billy o' Tea is still considered locked in an ongoing struggle with the whale, with the wellerman making "his regular call" to strengthen the captain and crew.

== Origin ==
The origin of the song is unknown. It was documented in 1966 by Neil Colquhoun from a man then in his 80s who said he had been taught it by his uncle. In 1973, "Soon May the Wellerman Come" was included in Colquhoun's book of New Zealand folk songs, New Zealand Folksongs: Songs of a Young Country.

== Recordings ==
The song has been frequently performed and remixed, with over 10 recorded renditions between 1971 and 2005. In 1990, the New England–based folk trio of Gordon Bok, Ann Mayo Muir, and Ed Trickett recorded and released a version on their studio album And So Will We Yet, produced by Folk-Legacy Records.

In 2013, the Wellington Sea Shanty Society released a version of the song on their album Now That's What I Call Sea Shanties Vol. 1. A particularly well-known rendition of the song was made by the Bristol-based a cappella musical group the Longest Johns on their collection of nautical songs Between Wind and Water in 2018. In the wake of the "ShantyTok" social media sensation in 2021, Wellington Sea Shanty Society member Lake Davineer remarked that their recording had experienced a new burst of popularity.

In 2021, two pirate metal bands covered "Wellerman"; Alestorm and Storm Seeker. In December 2023, a new version of the song was recorded for the trailer for the upcoming action-adventure game Skull and Bones.

== Popular culture adaptations and references ==
=== The Longest Johns version ===
"Wellerman"

Song by the Longest Johns

from the album Between Wind and Water
- Released: 8 June 2018
- Genre: Folk
- Length: 2:18
- Label: Decca
- Producer: The Longest Johns

The version of the song recorded by British folk group the Longest Johns (under the name "Wellerman") features as the third track on the group's second studio album, Between Wind and Water (2018). A remix of the song was released on 12 January 2021.

Chart (2021)	Peak position
Canadian Digital Songs (Billboard)	38
UK Singles (Official Charts)	37

=== Nathan Evans version ===
"Wellerman (Sea Shanty)"

Single by Nathan Evans

from the album Wellerman – The Album
- Released: 22 January 2021
- Genre: Folk, pop
- Length: 2:35
- Label: Polydor
- Producer: Saltwives

Nathan Evans singles chronology
"Hollywood (Acoustic)" (2020)	"Wellerman (Sea Shanty)" (2021)	"Wellerman (220 Kid x Billen Ted remix)" (2021)

Videos
- "Wellerman" (music video) on YouTube

"Wellerman" (220 Kid x Billen Ted remix)

Single by Nathan Evans

from the album Wellerman – The Album
- Released: 22 January 2021
- Genre: Deep house, pop, electronic
- Length: 1:56
- Label: Polydor
- Songwriters: Nathan Evans; Alexander Oriet; David Phelan; William Graydon; Samuel Brennan; Tom Hollings
- Producers: 220 Kid; Billen Ted

Nathan Evans singles chronology
"Wellerman (Sea Shanty)" (2021)	"Wellerman" (220 Kid x Billen Ted remix) (2021)	"Told You So" (2021)

220 Kid singles chronology
"Too Many Nights" (2020)	"Wellerman" (220 Kid x Billen Ted remix) (2021)	"Unconditional" (2021)

Billen Ted singles chronology
"Satisfied" (2020)	"Wellerman" (220 Kid x Billen Ted remix) (2021)

Music video
- "Wellerman" (220KID x Billen Ted Remix music video on YouTube

A version by Scottish musician Nathan Evans further increased the song's exposure. Popularized as a sea shanty despite being more accurately described as a ballad (or specifically a "forebitter" or "sea song"), there was a surge in interest in sea shanties and a multitude of remixes and new versions. Evans's version has been praised for its "authentic sense of stoic forbearance" that has appealed to young people in lockdown during the COVID-19 pandemic, who like 19th-century whalers "are similarly marking time". In the Rolling Stone article discussing his success, Evans cited the Albany Shantymen version of the song as inspiration. Because of its origins on TikTok, the trend of performing sea songs like "Soon May the Wellerman Come" on social media has been called "ShantyTok". The song, jointly credited to Nathan Evans and remixers 220 Kid and Billen Ted by the Official Charts Company (OCC), reached number one on the UK Singles Chart. Another version of "Wellerman" with German folk band Santiano was released as a single on 19 February 2021. This version was included on the track listing of Santiano's EP Sea Shanties – Wellerman, which was released digitally on 26 February 2021.

In February 2021, Evans, 220 Kid, and Billen Ted performed the song on the CBBC television programme Blue Peter. In March 2021, Evans performed the song on the "End of the Show Show" segment on Ant & Dec's Saturday Night Takeaway, "Soon When the Saturday Come" along with the programme's presenters. The performance included altered lyrics for the occasion and was accompanied by video footage of sing-alongs by celebrities, including Joan Collins, Josh Groban, Laura Whitmore and Dermot O'Leary. Crew members of the Royal National Lifeboat Institution, including those from Portishead and Sheringham, also submitted videos for the performance, and Queen guitarist Brian May provided a guitar solo. In the seven countries where the remix has reached the top of the record charts, 200 non-fungible tokens were sold, which each included a new dance track, digital art, and a password redeemable for a future asset, with part of their proceeds going to the Royal National Lifeboat Institution and a scholarship by 220 Kid.

The version sparked multiple parodies, both on and off TikTok, including a Taylor Swift hit sung to the tune of Evans' version of "Wellerman" performed by the United States Navy Band, a Roman Catholic priest who changed the shanty's lyrics to explain Ash Wednesday, and a COVID-19 vaccine parody called "Waiting for the Vaccine" by Rainer Hersch.

In 2022, the Seattle Mariners used the 220 Kid and Billen Ted remix of the Evans track as a rally song for attendees at T-Mobile Park.

==== Track listings ====
Digital download
No.	Title	Length
1.	"Wellerman (Sea Shanty)"	2:35

Digital download – karaoke version
No.	Title	Length
1.	"Wellerman" (Sea Shanty / karaoke version)	2:34

Digital download – 220 Kid x Billen Ted remix
No.	Title	Length
1.	"Wellerman" (Sea Shanty / 220 Kid x Billen Ted remix)	1:56

Digital download – 220 Kid x Billen Ted remix karaoke version
No.	Title	Length
1.	"Wellerman" (Sea Shanty / 220 Kid x Billen Ted remix / karaoke version)	1:57

Digital download – Argules version
No.	Title	Length
1.	"Wellerman" (Sea Shanty / Nathan Evans x Argules)	1:47

Digital download – The Kiffness remix
No.	Title	Length
1.	"Wellerman" (Sea Shanty / The Kiffness remix)	3:03

Digital download – Santiano version
No.	Title	Length
1.	"Wellerman" (with Santiano)	3:11

CD maxi single
No.	Title	Length
1.	"Wellerman" (Sea Shanty)	2:36
2.	"Wellerman" (Sea Shanty / 220 Kid x Billen Ted remix)	1:57
3.	"Wellerman" (with Santiano)	3:11

==== Personnel ====
Credits adapted from Discogs.

- Saltwives – producer, engineer, studio personnel
- Alex Oriet
- David Phelan
- Nathan Evans – associated performer, vocals
- Samuel Brannan
- Tom Hollings
- William Graydon
- Mike Hillier – mastering engineer, studio personnel
- James Reynolds – mixer, studio personnel

== Charts and certifications ==
=== Weekly chart performance for "Wellerman (Sea Shanty)" ===
Chart (2021)	Peak position
Austria (Ö3 Austria Top 40)	1
Belgium (Ultratop 50 Flanders)	1
Belgium (Ultratop 50 Wallonia)	21
Canada (Canadian Hot 100)	54
Germany (GfK)	1
Germany Airplay (BVMI)	2
Global 200 (Billboard)	16
Hungary (Rádiós Top 40)	1
Hungary (Single Top 40)	4
Hungary (Stream Top 40)	7
Latvia (European Hit Radio)	1
New Zealand Hot Singles (RMNZ)	39
Norway (VG-lista)	1
Portugal (AFP)	154
Romania (Airplay 100)	81
Sweden (Sverigetopplistan)	9
Switzerland (Schweizer Hitparade)	1
US Billboard Hot 100	116
US Digital Songs (Billboard)	4

=== 2021 year-end chart performance for "Wellerman (Sea Shanty)" ===
Chart (2021)	Position
Belgium (Ultratop Flanders)	14
Belgium (Ultratop Wallonia)	91
Germany (Official German Charts)	1
Global 200 (Billboard)	66
Hungary (Radio Top 40)	16
Hungary (Single Top 40)	30
Hungary (Stream Top 40)	19
Sweden (Sverigetopplistan)	25
Switzerland (Swiss Hitparade)	1

=== 2022 year-end chart performance for "Wellerman (Sea Shanty)" ===
Chart (2022)	Position
Germany (Official German Charts)	32
Global Excl. US (Billboard)	189
Switzerland (Swiss Hitparade)	31

=== Certifications for "Wellerman (Sea Shanty)" ===
Region	Certification	Certified units/sales
Australia (ARIA)	2× Platinum	140,000‡
Belgium (BEA)	Gold	20,000‡
Brazil (Pro-Música Brasil)	2× Platinum	80,000‡
Canada (Music Canada)	4× Platinum	320,000‡
Denmark (IFPI Danmark)	2× Platinum	180,000‡
France (SNEP)	Diamond	333,333‡
New Zealand (RMNZ)	Platinum	30,000‡
Poland (ZPAV)	3× Platinum	150,000‡
Spain (PROMUSICAE)	Gold	30,000‡
Switzerland (IFPI Switzerland)	Gold	10,000‡
United States (RIAA)	Gold	500,000‡
^{‡} Sales+streaming figures based on certification alone.

=== Weekly chart performance for "Wellerman" (220 Kid x Billen Ted remix) ===
Chart (2021)	Peak position
Australia (ARIA)	62
Austria (Ö3 Austria Top 40)	1
Czech Republic (Rádio – Top 100)	5
Czech Republic (Singles Digitál Top 100)	8
Denmark (Hitlisten)	10
Finland (The Official Finnish Charts)	6
France (SNEP)	36
Iceland (Music of Iceland)	19
Ireland (IRMA)	2
Netherlands (Dutch Top 40)	1
Netherlands (Single Top 100)	1
Norway (VG-lista)	1
Poland (Polish Airplay Top 100)	5
Slovakia (Rádio Top 100)	31
Slovakia (Singles Digitál Top 100)	13
UK Singles (OCC)	1
UK Audio Streaming (OCC)	1
UK Dance (OCC)	1
UK Physical Singles Chart (OCC)	1
UK Singles Chart Update (OCC)	1
UK Singles Downloads (OCC)	1
UK Singles Sales Chart (OCC)	1
UK Streaming Chart (OCC)	2

=== 2021 year-end chart performance for "Wellerman" (220 Kid x Billen Ted remix) ===
Chart (2021)	Position
Austria (Ö3 Austria Top 40)	1
Denmark (Tracklisten)	40
France (SNEP)	104
Ireland (IRMA)	35
Netherlands (Dutch Top 40)	17
Netherlands (Single Top 100)	12
Norway (VG-lista)	12
Poland (ZPAV)	59
UK Singles (OCC)	11

=== 2022 year-end chart performance for "Wellerman" (220 Kid x Billen Ted remix) ===
Chart (2022)	Position
Austria (Ö3 Austria Top 40)	26

=== Certifications for "Wellerman" (220 Kid x Billen Ted remix) ===
Region	Certification	Certified units/sales
Austria (IFPI Austria)	3× Platinum	90,000‡
Germany (BVMI)	Diamond	1,000,000‡
Italy (FIMI)	Gold	50,000‡
United Kingdom (BPI)	2× Platinum	1,200,000‡
Streaming
Sweden (GLF)	3× Platinum	36,000,000†
^{‡} Sales+streaming figures based on certification alone.^{†} Streaming-only figures based on certification alone.

== See also ==
- List of number-one hits of 2021 (Austria)
- List of Ultratop 50 number-one singles of 2021
- List of number-one hits of 2021 (Germany)
- List of number-one singles of the 2020s (Hungary)
- List of top 10 singles in 2021 (Ireland)
- List of Dutch Top 40 number-one singles of 2021
- List of number-one songs in Norway
- List of number-one hits of 2021 (Switzerland)
- List of Official Audio Streaming Chart number ones of the 2020s
- List of UK Dance Singles Chart number ones of 2021
- List of UK Singles Chart number ones of the 2020s
- List of UK Singles Downloads Chart number ones of the 2020s
- List of UK top-ten singles in 2021
- Lightning Tree song
