= Heather on the Hill =

Single by Nathan Evans

from the album 1994
- Released: 26 January 2024
- Recorded: 2023–2024
- Genre: Folk, folk-pop
- Label: Better Now, Universal Music, GmbH
- Songwriters: Nathan Evans; Lewis Gardiner; Alan Jukes; Stephen Jukes
- Producers: Alan Jukes; Stephen Jukes; Lewis Gardiner

Nathan Evans singles chronology
"Catch You When You Fall" (2023)	"Heather on the Hill" (2024)	"Driving to Nowhere" (2023)

"Heather on the Hill" is a song by the Scottish singer-songwriter Nathan Evans, released on 26 January 2024 as a single. It appears on his second album, 1994. It was certified Silver in November 2024 by the British Phonographic Industry (BPI) for sales in excess of 200,000 copies.

== Background and release ==
Following his viral sea-shanty success in 2021, Evans developed original folk-pop material. Heather on the Hill was released digitally and streamed worldwide, including a “Bagpipe Version.”

== Reception ==
Critics praised its Scottish folk atmosphere. The Central Trend highlighted its romance. The song peaked at number 42 on the UK Official Singles Chart, and spent a combined total of nine weeks within the top 100. It was subsequently certified Silver by the British Phonographic Industry (BPI) in November 2024. It achieved considerable commercial success on the UK Streaming Singles Charts, where it peaked at number 12, as well as number 11 on the UK Singles Sales Charts. In the Republic of Ireland, it peaked at number 30 and spent a combined total of six weeks within the Irish Singles Charts.

== Personnel ==
Credits adapted from album and single liner notes.

- Nathan Evans – lead vocals, songwriter
- Lewis Gardiner – songwriter, producer, instrumentation
- Alan Jukes – songwriter, producer, instrumentation
- Stephen Jukes – songwriter, producer, instrumentation
- Session musicians – strings, banjo, fiddle, percussion
- Mixing engineer – Alan Jukes
- Mastering engineer – Stephen Jukes

== Formats ==
- Digital download and streaming – standard version
- Bagpipe Version – digital download and streaming featuring traditional Scottish bagpipes

== Charts ==
Weekly chart performance for Heather on the Hill
Chart (2024)	Peak position
United Kingdom (OCC)	42
Ireland (IRMA)	30

== Certifications ==
Region	Certification	Certified units/sales
United Kingdom (BPI)	Silver	200,000^{‡}
^{‡} Sales+streaming figures based on certification alone.

== Release history ==
Release history for Heather on the Hill
Region	Date	Format	Label
United Kingdom	26 January 2024	Digital download, streaming	Better Now Records / Universal Music, GmbH
United States	26 January 2024	Digital download, streaming	Better Now Records / Universal Music, GmbH
Europe	26 January 2024	Digital download, streaming	Better Now Records / Universal Music, GmbH
