= Santiano (band) =

German folk group

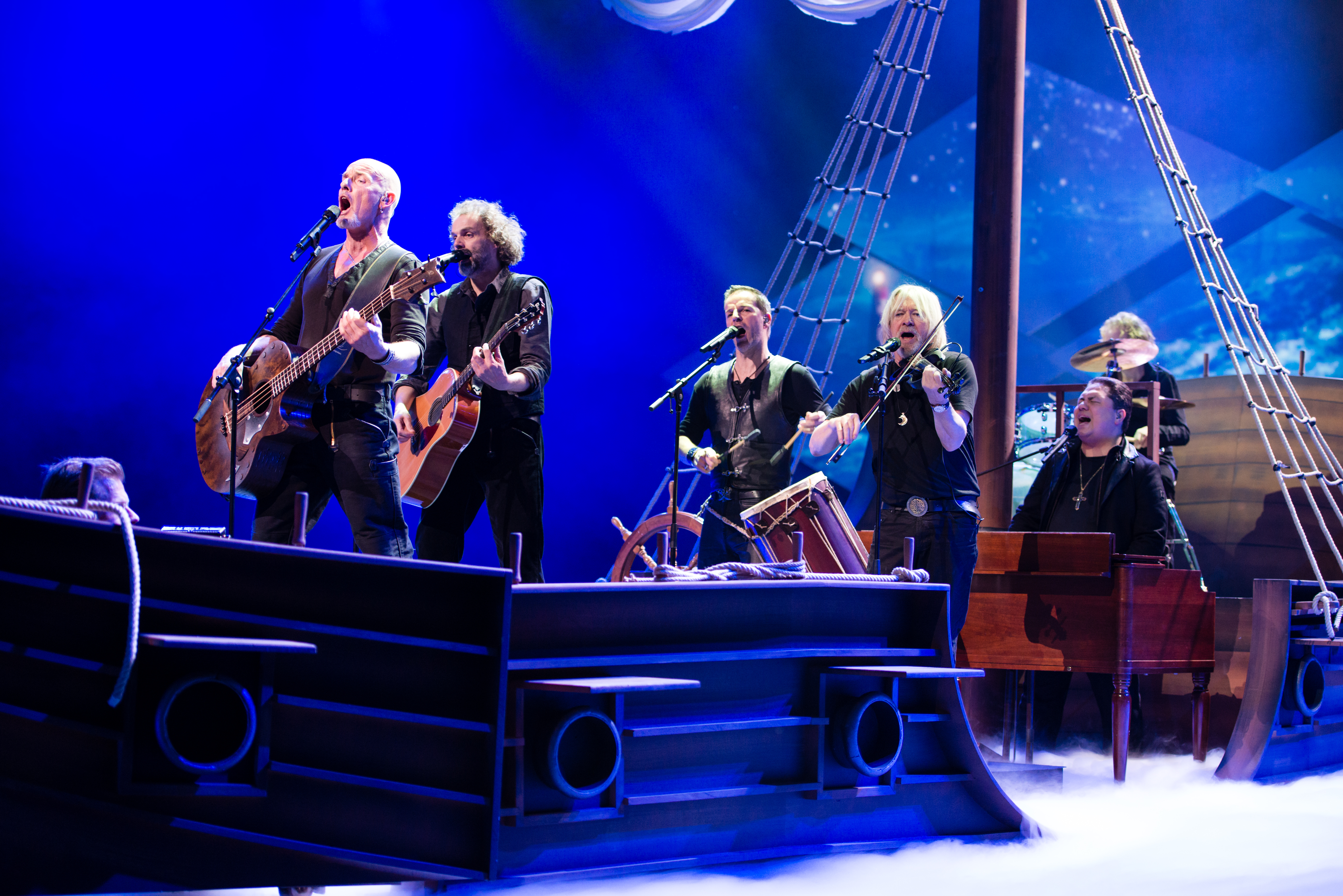
- Santiano at Unser Song für Dänemark, 2014

Background information
- Origin: Schleswig-Holstein, Germany
- Genres: Shanty; medieval folk rock; irish folk; schlager; Volkstümliche Musik
- Years active: 2011–present
- Members: Hans-Timm "Timsen" Hinrichsen; Axel Stosberg; Björn Both; Andreas Fahnert; Peter David "Pete" Sage
- Website: santiano-music.de

Santiano is a German band from the northern state of Schleswig-Holstein, Germany, whose songs combine rock, Irish folk, sea shanty, and schlager music. The name Santiano is taken from the Hugues Aufray song of the same name. They topped the German album charts multiple times in the 2010s, also ranking high in Austrian and Swiss charts.

== History ==
The idea for the band originated with German producer Hartmut Krech of Flensburg, who owns the Elephant Music label. On 3 February 2012, the band appeared at We Love Music, an event promoted by Universal Music and ProSiebenSat.1 Media. Their first album, titled Bis ans Ende der Welt ("To the end of the World"), was released in 2012. It reached #1 in the German charts. That same year, the group completed a European tour, including a performance at the Wacken Open Air festival. A live CD/DVD of the event was released in November 2012.

In 2013 and 2014, they received an Echo award for best Folk music. Santiano appeared as an opening act for Helene Fischer's 2013 summer tour, and toured Germany from November 2013 to April 2014.

Their second studio album, Mit den Gezeiten ("With the tides"), was released in 2013 and reached #1 in the German charts. This album contains more rock elements than "Bis ans Ende der Welt" but still draws upon themes surrounding the sea and North German myths.

In 2014, they participated in Unser Song für Dänemark, the national selection for the Eurovision Song Contest 2014 with the songs Wir werden niemals untergehen and Fiddler on the Deck. They were eliminated in Round 2 of the final.

Their third studio album, Von Liebe, Tod und Freiheit ("On love, death and freedom") was released in May 2015 and provided the band with another #1 album in Germany. As its title suggests, deeper themes are addressed in the lyrics of this album but this is offset by a number of folk-based songs which promote the importance of camaraderie and togetherness when dealing with such themes.

The band appeared for a fourth time at the Wacken Open Air festival in 2015 and continued to tour into 2016.

== Discography ==
=== Albums ===
List of studio albums, with selected chart positions, sales figures and certifications
Year	Title	Peak chart positions		
Year	Title	GER	AUT	SWI
2012	Bis ans Ende der Welt	1	15	25
2013	Mit den Gezeiten	1	31	21
2015	Von Liebe, Tod und Freiheit	1	9	2
2017	Im Auge des Sturms	1	5	5
2019	MTV Unplugged	1	19	55
2021	Wenn die Kälte kommt	1	4	1
2022	Die Sehnsucht ist mein Steuermann – Das Beste aus 10 Jahren	1	10	5
2023	Doggerland	1	3	3
2025	Da braut sich was zusammen	1	7	11

=== EPs ===
- 2021: Sea Shanties – Wellerman

=== Singles ===
- 2012: "Santiano"
- 2015: "Lieder der Freiheit"
- 2017: "Sail Away"
- 2017: "Könnt ihr mich hören"
- 2017: "Ich bring dich heim"
- 2018: "Mädchen von Haithabu"
- 2019: "Wie Zuhause"
- 2021: "Wellerman" (feat. Nathan Evans)
- 2021: "Wenn die Kälte kommt"
- 2022: "Nichts als Horizonte"
- 2022: "Santiano (English Version)" (feat. Nathan Evans)
- 2023: "Es klingt nach Freiheit"
- 2023: "Bully in the Alley"
- 2023: "Zu alt um jung zu sterben"
- 2025: "Da braut sich was zusammen"
- 2025: "Ekke Nekkepenn"
- 2025: "Dann bin ich weg"
- 2025: "Tanzen wie die Teufel"

=== Music videos ===
- 2012: Frei wie der Wind
- 2013: Gott muss ein Seemann sein
- 2015: Lieder der Freiheit
- 2015: Weh mir
- 2017: Könnt ihr mich hören
- 2017: Ich bring dich heim
- 2018: Mädchen von Haithabu
- 2021: Wellerman
- 2021: Wenn die Kälte kommt
- 2021: Was du liebst
- 2021: Wer kann segeln ohne Wind
- 2022: Wellerman (ft. Nathan Evans)
- 2022: Durch jeden Sturm
- 2023: Es klingt nach Freiheit
- 2023: Zu alt um jung zu sterben
- 2024: Retter in der Not
- 2024: Keiner geht verloren
- 2025: Dann bin ich weg
- 2025: Tanzen wie die Teufel
