= Saint Phnx =

Scottish musical duo

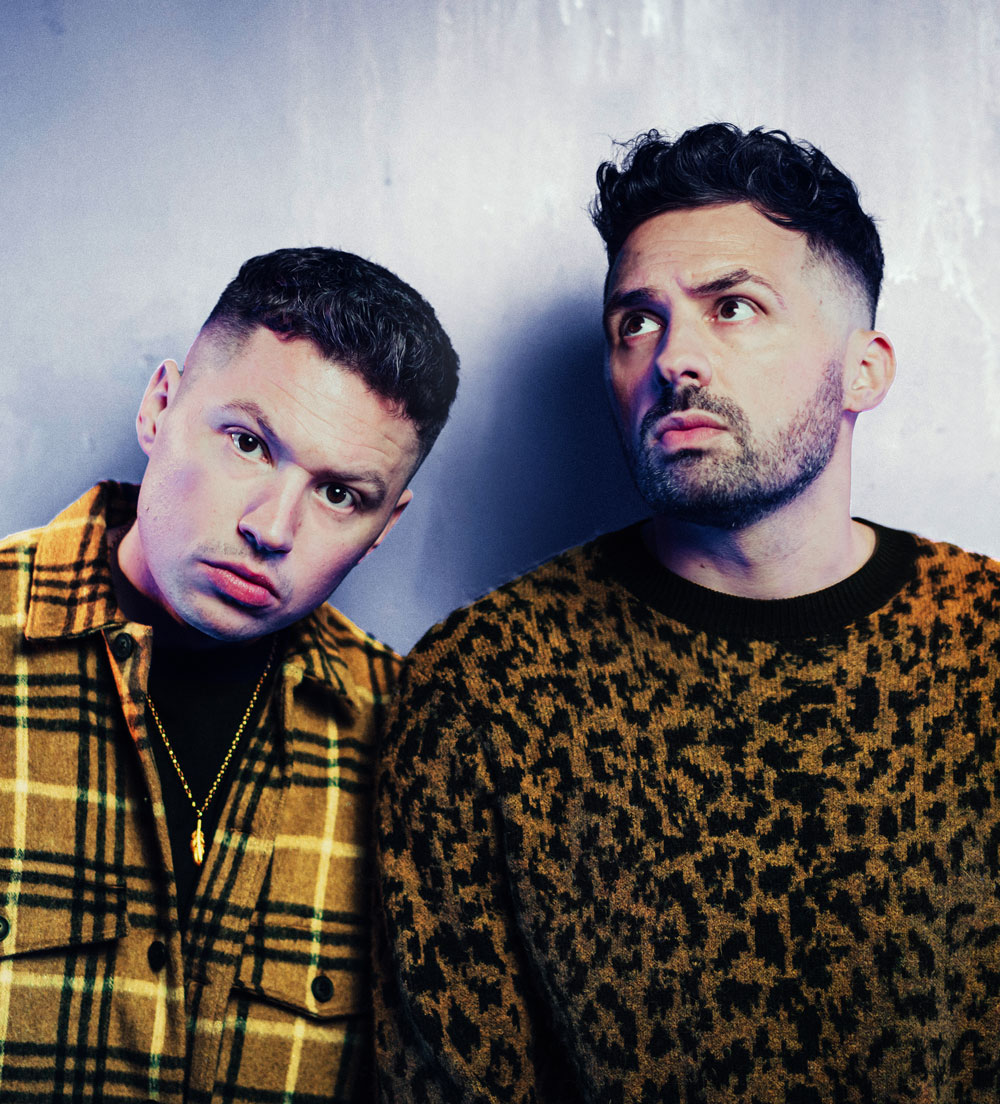

Background information
- Origin: Wishaw, Scotland
- Genres: Alternative pop; indie pop
- Years active: 2016–present
- Labels: Atlantic, DDMN
- Members: Alan Jukes; Stevie Jukes
- Website: saintphnx.com

Saint Phnx (pronounced "saint phoenix" and stylized as SAINT PHNX) are a Scottish musical duo formed by brothers Alan and Stevie Jukes in 2016. Currently signed to Atlantic Records, they released their debut studio album DDMN on 31 January 2020. On 2 July 2021, the band released "Happy Place", a song they wrote in tribute to their father, who died 19 January 2021. Their debut EP Happy Place was released on 28 January 2022.

Saint Phnx have toured with artists such as Imagine Dragons, Yungblud, Arizona, and Lewis Capaldi.

== History ==
=== 2016–2019 ===
Saint Phnx was formed in 2016 by brothers Alan and Stevie Jukes. Previously being members in a band called Vigo Thieves, Saint Phnx started out by releasing some self-released singles, with their debut single Reload being released the same year. The band released their subsequent single "King", which found airplay on UK radio stations, despite not being signed to a record label. The following year in 2017, the band were chosen to support Imagine Dragons at a show at the Roundhouse in London. In 2019, the band made an appearance at South By Southwest, and supported Yungblud on his North American and European tours.

=== DDMN ===
Saint Phnx started recording their debut album DDMN in 2018, with the album being released on 31 January 2020.

=== Happy Place ===
In 2021, Saint Phnx signed to Atlantic Records. Following the passing of their father on 19 January 2021, Saint Phnx wrote "Happy Place" in his honour and released it as a single on 2 July 2021.

During an interview with Flaunt on the origin of the band's name, vocalist Stevie Jukes stated:

"Previously, we were in a band for a number of years. We got some national success in Scotland, nothing to run home about. We obviously wanted to try something different, try something new, try to make bigger songs, and the name comes from that. From moving on from our last band. Phoenix as in rising from the flames and Saint being in a higher place, that's the whole idea behind it."

— Stevie Jukes

The band later announced their debut EP Happy Place, which was released on 28 January 2022. Following its release, the EP peaked at number 39 on the UK Albums Chart and number 1 on the Scottish Albums Chart.

In May 2022, the band released "Make Us Dream", a song centered around the band's support for Scottish football club Rangers F.C. when they faced German football club Eintracht Frankfurt in the 2022 UEFA Europa League Final.

In January 2026, having written and performed with fellow Scottish singer Nathan Evans previously, the duo released an album in collaboration with him, entitled Angels' Share. The album peaked at number 4 on the UK Albums Chart, and at number 1 on the Scottish Albums Chart.

== Members ==
- Stevie Jukes – lead vocals, guitar, bass (2016–present)
- Alan Jukes – backing vocals, drums, percussion (2016–present)

== Discography ==
=== Studio albums ===
Title	Album details
DDMN	Released: 31 January 2020; Label: DDMN; Formats: digital download, music streaming

=== EPs ===
List of EPs, with selected details and peak chart positions
Title	Details	Peak chart positions	
Title	Details	SCO	UK
Happy Place	Released: 28 January 2022; Label: Atlantic; Formats: digital download, streaming|	1	39

=== Singles ===
List of singles, with peak chart positions, showing year released and album name
Title	Year	Peak chart positions		Album
Title	Year	UK	UK Down.	Album
"Reload"	2016	—	—	Non-album singles
"King"	2016	—	—	Non-album singles
"Rise"	2017	—	—	Non-album singles
"Magic"	2017	—	—	Non-album singles
"One"	2018	—	—	Non-album singles
"Deadmen / Death of Me"	2018	—	—	DDMN
"Shake"	2019	—	—	DDMN
"Nunchuck"	2019	—	—	DDMN
"Bury a Friend"	2019	—	—	Non-album single
"Sorry"	2019	—	—	DDMN
"Scream"	2019	—	—	DDMN
"DDMN 1.1"	2020	—	—	Non-album singles
"DDMN 1.2"	2020	—	—	Non-album singles
"Happy Place"	2021	—	17	Happy Place EP
"Peace"	2021	—	—	Happy Place EP
"Happy Place" (featuring Jasmine Thompson)	2021	—	—	Happy Place EP
"Make Us Dream"	2022	85	2	Non-album singles
"Friends"	2022	—	—	Non-album singles
"—" denotes a recording that did not chart or was not released in that territory.
