= Nathan Evans (singer) =

Scottish singer (born 1994)

- Born: Nathan Alexander Evans; 19 December 1994 (age 31); Airdrie, Lanarkshire, Scotland
- Genres: Country; folk; sea shanty; acoustic
- Occupations: Singer; songwriter
- Instruments: Vocals; guitar; keyboards
- Years active: 2020–present
- Labels: Polydor, Universal, EMI
- Website: Official website

Nathan Alexander Evans (born 19 December 1994) is a Scottish folk and country singer who rose to prominence in 2020 by posting videos of himself singing sea shanties on the social media service TikTok. In 2021, he released a version of the folk song "Wellerman", which peaked at the top of the UK Singles Chart and also charted in several other countries. His debut album, Wellerman – The Album, was released in 2022 and achieved moderate success in continental Europe. It peaked at number twelve on the albums charts in Germany, as well as reaching number thirty in Switzerland.

In 2024, he released his second album, 1994, to commercial success, debuting atop the albums charts in his native Scotland, as well as peaking within the top ten of the Album Sales, Albums Downloads and Physical Albums Charts in the United Kingdom, whilst reaching number twenty–six on the official UK Albums Charts. It spawned the commercially successful single "Heather on the Hill", which was subsequently certified Silver by the British Phonographic Industry (BPI). He released his third studio album, Angels' Share, a collaborative album with Saint Phnx, on 16 January, 2026.

== Early and personal life ==
Before launching his music career, Evans was a postal worker with the Royal Mail, in Airdrie, an inland town in North Lanarkshire, to the east of Glasgow. He attended Caldervale High School and has a university degree in web design. Evans started learning guitar at the age of eight, being a fan of music genres and artists including Blink-182, Bob Dylan, Van Morrison and Paul Simon, later being influened by Lewis Capaldi and Ed Sheeran.

In the 2023 BBC Scotland documentary What Next for the Wellerman?, Evans revealed that he was struggling with his mental health and had panic attacks while he was working up to 13 hours a day as a steel erector. Evans married his fiancée Holly, whom he had known since school, in 2019 and together they have two children, born in April 2023 and April 2026.

He is a Rangers fan and has performed at Ibrox Stadium.

== Music career ==
=== Breakthrough (2020–2024) ===
Evans had been posting performances of pop and folk songs to TikTok before beginning to post sea shanties. He posted his first traditional sea shanty, "Leave Her Johnny", to TikTok in July 2020. In the following months, viewers of his videos continued to request more sea shanties. Evans subsequently posted videos of himself singing "The Scotsman" and the New Zealand folk song "Wellerman" in December 2020. "Wellerman", which was already well known on the app due to the popularity of his version of the song, quickly gained views on TikTok, inspiring many others to duet and to remix the song, including renditions by composer Andrew Lloyd Webber, comedians Jimmy Fallon and Stephen Colbert, guitarist Brian May, and entrepreneur Elon Musk. As of January 2021, "Wellerman" had eight million views on TikTok and as of 29 May, Evans had 1.3 million followers. The sea shanties trend on the app has been called "ShantyTok". In the Rolling Stone article discussing his success, Evans cited The Albany Shantymen version of the song as inspiration.

In January 2021, Evans signed a three-single recording contract with Polydor Records, releasing his official version of "Wellerman" on 22 January 2021. A dance remix of the song created with producers 220 Kid and duo Billen Ted was released simultaneously. His growing music career led him to quit his job as a postal worker. In February 2021, he signed to United Talent Agency. In May 2021, Evans played his first live show. The performance took place in London aboard an electric GoBoat in the River Thames as a promotion for GoBoat's new location at Canary Wharf. Writing about the nature of Evans' success during the Covid restrictions, Amanda Petrusich wrote in The New Yorker: "It seems possible that after nearly a year of solitude and collective self-banishment, and of crushing restrictions on travel and adventure, the shantey might be providing a brief glimpse into a different, more exciting way of life, a world of sea air and pirates and grog."

In May 2021, Evan's was the spokesperson for Scotland at the Free European Song Contest 2021. Evans's second single, "Told You So", was released on 25 June 2021. Like with "Wellerman", two versions were released: a folk-pop version and a dance-pop remix by Digital Farm Animals. Evans released his third single, "Ring Ding (A Scotsman's Story)", on 8 October 2021. In April 2022, Evans helped publicise the Doctor Who story "Legend of the Sea Devils" with an adaptation of "Wellerman". Evans planned to release a five-song EP of sea shanties in 2021. However, in November 2022, Evans released his first full-length album, titled Wellerman – The Album, a collection of sea shanties that includes his viral 2021 cover of "Wellerman" and its dance remix. The album also includes Evans's original composition "Haul Away". In 2022 he was featured on the single "Santiano" by the German band of the same name.

=== 1994 and touring (2024–2025) ===
In 2024, Evans shifted toward writing and releasing original songs. On 8 November 2024, he released his second album, 1994. The album integrates folk instrumentation with contemporary pop production, reflecting Evans’s intention to establish himself as a modern Scottish singer-songwriter. Upon release, 1994 debuted at number 1 on the Scottish Albums Chart and reached number 26 on the UK Albums Chart.

Following the release of 1994, Evans began promoting the album with live performances. In early 2025, he announced a Scottish tour scheduled for March, including dates in Aberdeen, Edinburgh, Dundee, Strathpeffer, and Glasgow. Evans performed with a backing band featuring members associated with the alt-pop duo Saint PHNX and other musicians, allowing him to adapt the folk-pop arrangements of 1994 for the stage.

The 1994 era marked a clear artistic shift for Evans. Critics and listeners noted that the album signalled his intention to move beyond his internet origins and become a dedicated singer-songwriter, embracing themes of hope, resilience, love, and a Scottish folk-pop identity. By 2025, Evans was performing across the UK and Europe. Reviews of his March 2025 concerts, including a Berlin performance, highlighted his full-band arrangements and the strong reception to material from 1994.

=== Saint Phnx and Angels' share (2025–present) ===
Evans had first collaborated with Scottish duo Saint Phnx in 2024 with the song "Home", and in 2025, Evans, with Saint Phnx, released another collaborative single entitled "Arabella". The single achieved moderate commercial success in the United Kingdom, whilst it missed the official UK Singles Charts despite debuting at number eighty-nine on the mid–week chart update, it did debut at numbers fifteen and seventeen on the Singles Downloads Charts and Singles Sales Charts in the United Kingdom respectively. Ultimately, the commercial reception for the song resulted in Evans and the duo collaborating further to record a full length studio album, Angels' Share, which they toured in the United States.

The album continued the commercial success experienced by the pairs efforts prior, debuting atop the albums charts in their native Scotland, and debuting at number four on the albums charts in the United Kingdom, becoming Evan's first top five chart appearance on the UK Albums Charts.

== Musical style ==
Evans often uses multiple tracks of his own voice. He accompanies himself with guitar and percussion. He sings in a baritone.

== Other work ==
=== Television ===
In January 2022, Evans appeared as himself in the fourth episode of the seventh series of the BBC Scotland mockumentary series Scot Squad. In 2022 and 2024, he appeared as a racer at the World Wok Racing Championship, televised in Germany as a special episode of TV Total. In 2024, he appeared at the European Autoball Championship for the same TV show, while, in 2026, he took part in the TV total Turmspringen. However, he was injured during training, so he only watched from the sidelines and performed a song. In all instances, he represented his native Scotland. Evans makes a cameo as a non-player character in the 2023 Bethesda video game Starfield.

=== Publications ===
In May 2021, it was announced that Evans will be publishing a collection of Sea Shanties titled The Book of Sea Shanties: Wellerman and Other Songs from the Seven Seas. The book was published on 14 October 2021 by Welbeck. It contains over 35 classic shanties and the stories around them, as well as new original shanties by Evans.

== Discography ==
- Wellerman – The Album (2022)
- 1994 (2024)
- Angels' Share (with Saint Phnx) (2026)

== Filmography ==
Year	Title	Role	Notes	Ref.
2021	Free European Song Contest 2021	Himself	Spokesperson representing Scotland; Evans announced the votes from the Scottish jury	
2025	BBC Scotland's Hogmanay	Performer	BBC Scotland Hogmanay broadcast	
