= List of number-one hits of 2023 (Germany) =

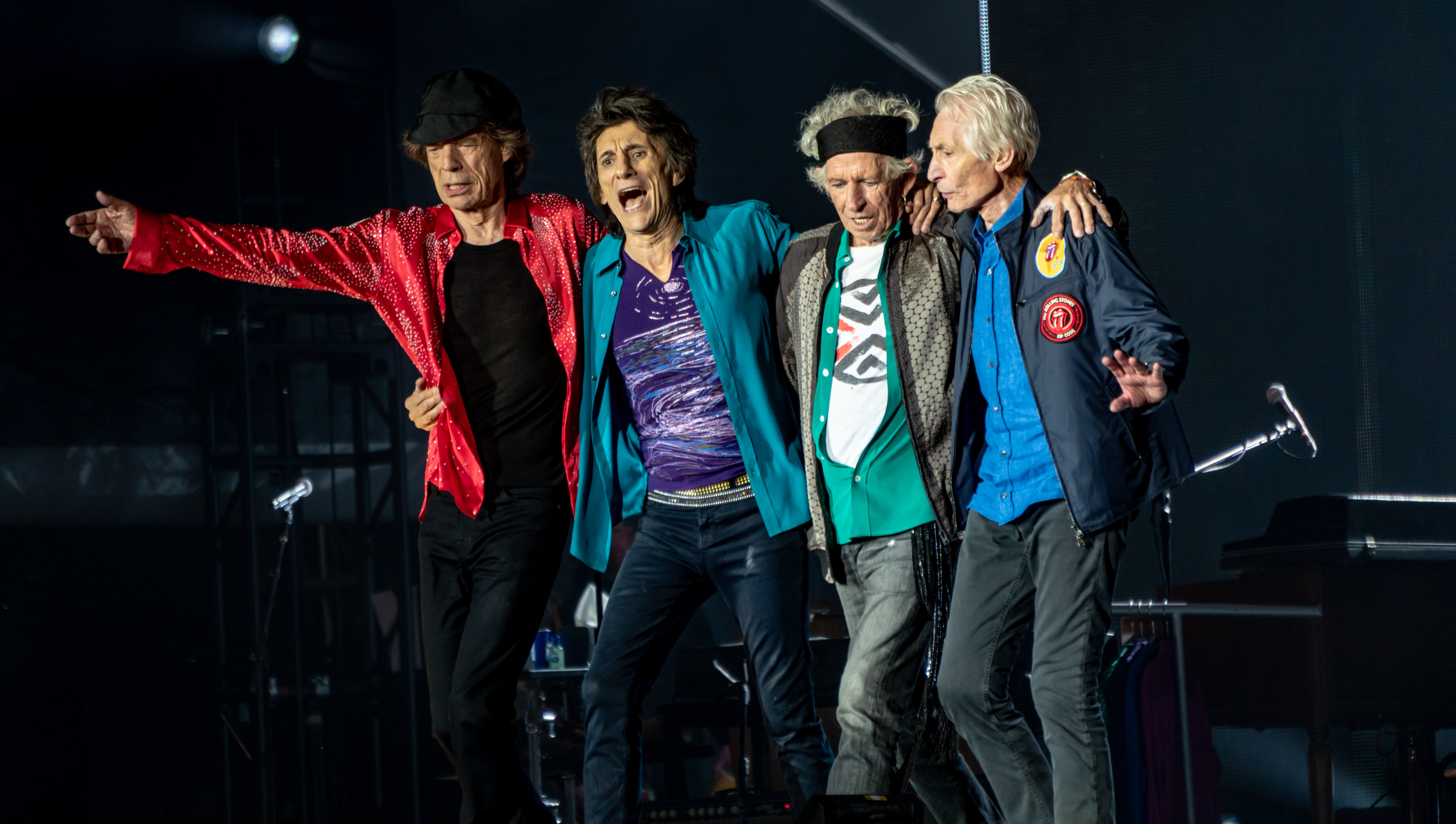
Udo Lindenberg's and Apache 207's "Komet" became the best-performing single of 2023, while The Rolling Stones' (pictured) Hackney Diamonds became the best-performing album of the year.

The GfK Entertainment charts are record charts compiled by GfK Entertainment on behalf of the German record industry. They include the "Single Top 100" and the "Album Top 100" chart. The chart week runs from Friday to Thursday, and the chart compilations are published on Tuesday for the record industry. The entire top 100 singles and top 100 albums are officially released the following Friday by GfK Entertainment. The charts are based on weekly physical and digital sales and streams of singles and albums, as well as the amount of airplay the songs receive on German radio stations.

== Number-one hits by week ==
Key
| † | Indicates best-performing single and album of 2023 |

| Issue date | Song | Artist | Ref. | Album | Artist | Ref. |
|---|---|---|---|---|---|---|
| 6 January | "I'm Good (Blue)" | David Guetta and Bebe Rexha | | Blood & Glitter | Lord of the Lost | |
| 13 January | "Sie weiß" | Ayliva featuring Mero | | Frei und grenzenlos | Daniela Alfinito | |
| 20 January | "Sie weiß" | Ayliva featuring Mero | | Mitten im Feuer | Fantasy | |
| 27 January | "Flowers" | Miley Cyrus | | Best Of | Die Amigos | |
| 3 February | "Komet" † | Udo Lindenberg and Apache 207 | | Ravenblack | Mono Inc. | |
| 10 February | "Komet" † | Udo Lindenberg and Apache 207 | | Heut ist ein guter Tag | Donots | |
| 17 February | "Komet" † | Udo Lindenberg and Apache 207 | | Foregone | In Flames | |
| 24 February | "Komet" † | Udo Lindenberg and Apache 207 | | Trustfall | Pink | |
| 3 March | "Komet" † | Udo Lindenberg and Apache 207 | | Glas | Nina Chuba | |
| 10 March | "Komet" † | Udo Lindenberg and Apache 207 | | Es ist Abend und wir sitzen bei mir | AnnenMayKantereit | |
| 17 March | "Komet" † | Udo Lindenberg and Apache 207 | | Illuminate | Schiller | |
| 24 March | "Komet" † | Udo Lindenberg and Apache 207 | | Songs of Surrender | U2 | |
| 31 March | "Komet" † | Udo Lindenberg and Apache 207 | | Memento Mori | Depeche Mode | |
| 7 April | "All Night" | RAF Camora featuring Luciano | | Memento Mori | Depeche Mode | |
| 14 April | "Komet" † | Udo Lindenberg and Apache 207 | | Meteora | Linkin Park | |
| 21 April | "Komet" † | Udo Lindenberg and Apache 207 | | 72 Seasons | Metallica | |
| 28 April | "Icecream" | Twenty4tim | | Dorfdisko zwei | Finch | |
| 5 May | "Komet" † | Udo Lindenberg and Apache 207 | | High & Hungrig 3 | Bonez MC and Gzuz | |
| 12 May | "Komet" † | Udo Lindenberg and Apache 207 | | − | Ed Sheeran | |
| 19 May | "Komet" † | Udo Lindenberg and Apache 207 | | Mr. Misunderstood | Reezy | |
| 26 May | "Komet" † | Udo Lindenberg and Apache 207 | | Erstmal zu Penny | Swiss und die Andern | |
| 2 June | "Hot or Not" | Twenty4tim featuring Kitty Kat | | Love Songs | Peter Fox | |
| 9 June | "Friesenjung" | Ski Aggu featuring Joost and Otto Waalkes | | Auf Auf | Silbermond | |
| 16 June | "Friesenjung" | Ski Aggu featuring Joost and Otto Waalkes | | Gartenstadt | Apache 207 | |
| 23 June | "Friesenjung" | Ski Aggu featuring Joost and Otto Waalkes | | Liebe in Gefahr | Montez | |
| 30 June | "Friesenjung" | Ski Aggu featuring Joost and Otto Waalkes | | XV | RAF Camora | |
| 7 July | "Komet" † | Udo Lindenberg and Apache 207 | | Balance | Beatrice Egli | |
| 14 July | "Komet" † | Udo Lindenberg and Apache 207 | | La Deutsche Vita | Kollegah | |
| 21 July | "Komet" † | Udo Lindenberg and Apache 207 | | Love Songs | Peter Fox | |
| 28 July | "Komet" † | Udo Lindenberg and Apache 207 | | Fegefeuer | Feuerschwanz | |
| 4 August | "Komet" † | Udo Lindenberg and Apache 207 | | Hope | Fury in the Slaughterhouse | |
| 11 August | "Komet" † | Udo Lindenberg and Apache 207 | | Rio | Die Schlagerpiloten | |
| 18 August | "Summertime" | Kontra K featuring Lana Del Rey | | Hochkultur 2 | Samy Deluxe | |
| 25 August | "Mädchen auf dem Pferd" | Luca-Dante Spadafora, Niklas Dee and Octavian | | Hollywood | Madsen | |
| 1 September | "9 bis 9" | Sira featuring Bausa and Badchieff | | Schwarzes Herz | Ayliva | |
| 8 September | "9 bis 9" | Sira featuring Bausa and Badchieff | | Ein Herz für Bitches | Katja Krasavice | |
| 15 September | "9 bis 9" | Sira featuring Bausa and Badchieff | | Guts | Olivia Rodrigo | |
| 22 September | "9 bis 9" | Sira featuring Bausa and Badchieff | | Phoenix | Twenty4tim | |
| 29 September | "9 bis 9" | Sira featuring Bausa and Badchieff | | Das Beste | Fantasy | |
| 6 October | "9 bis 9" | Sira featuring Bausa and Badchieff | | Autumn Variations | Ed Sheeran | |
| 13 October | "Hässlich" | Ayliva | | Doggerland | Santiano | |
| 20 October | "Prada" | Cassö, Raye and D-Block Europe | | Denk mal drüber nach... | Ski Aggu | |
| 27 October | "Si No Estás" | Iñigo Quintero | | Hackney Diamonds † | The Rolling Stones | |
| 3 November | "Liebe Grüße" | RAF Camora and Ski Aggu | | 1989 (Taylor's Version) | Taylor Swift | |
| 10 November | "Now and Then" | The Beatles | | Blaue Stunden | 01099 | |
| 17 November | "Die Sonne" | Kontra K featuring Santos | | Die Hoffnung klaut mir niemand | Kontra K | |
| 24 November | "Prada" | Cassö, Raye and D-Block Europe | | Weihnacht | Andrea Berg | |
| 1 December | "Atemlos durch die Nacht" (10 Year Anniversary Version) | Helene Fischer featuring Shirin David | | Nur Liebe, immer. | Casper | |
| 8 December | "All I Want for Christmas Is You" | Mariah Carey | | Wincents weisse Weihnachten | Wincent Weiss | |
| 15 December | "All I Want for Christmas Is You" | Mariah Carey | | Hackney Diamonds † | The Rolling Stones | |
| 22 December | "All I Want for Christmas Is You" | Mariah Carey | | Hackney Diamonds † | The Rolling Stones | |
| 29 December | "All I Want for Christmas Is You" | Mariah Carey | | Christmas | Michael Bublé | |
