= List of number-one hits of 2023 (Austria) =

This is a list of the Austrian number-one singles and albums of 2023 as compiled by Ö3 Austria Top 40, the official chart provider of Austria.

Issue date	Song	Artist	Album	Artist
3 January	"Last Christmas"	Wham!	Da capo, Udo Jürgens – Stationen einer Weltkarriere	Udo Jürgens
10 January	"I'm Good (Blue)"	David Guetta and Bebe Rexha	Da capo, Udo Jürgens – Stationen einer Weltkarriere	Udo Jürgens
17 January	"Sie weiß"	Ayliva featuring Mero	Frei und grenzenlos	Daniela Alfinito
24 January	"Flowers"	Miley Cyrus	Neujahrskonzert 2023 – New Year's Concert	Wiener Philharmoniker/Franz Welser-Möst
31 January	"Flowers"	Miley Cyrus	Rush!	Måneskin
7 February	"Flowers"	Miley Cyrus	Neujahrskonzert 2023 – New Year's Concert	Wiener Philharmoniker/Franz Welser-Möst
14 February	"Flowers"	Miley Cyrus	Neujahrskonzert 2023 – New Year's Concert	Wiener Philharmoniker/Franz Welser-Möst
21 February	"Flowers"	Miley Cyrus	Foregone	In Flames
28 February	"Flowers"	Miley Cyrus	Trustfall	Pink
7 March	"Flowers"	Miley Cyrus	Glas	Nina Chuba
14 March	"Flowers"	Miley Cyrus	Love My Life	Ufo361
21 March	"Flowers"	Miley Cyrus	Endless Summer Vacation	Miley Cyrus
28 March	"Flowers"	Miley Cyrus	Songs of Surrender	U2
4 April	"Flowers"	Miley Cyrus	Memento Mori	Depeche Mode
11 April	"All Night"	RAF Camora featuring Luciano	Das ist los	Herbert Grönemeyer
18 April	"All Night"	RAF Camora featuring Luciano	Meteora	Linkin Park
25 April	"Komet"	Udo Lindenberg and Apache 207	72 Seasons	Metallica
2 May	"Cinnamon Roll"	Bonez MC and Gzuz	72 Seasons	Metallica
9 May	"Komet"	Udo Lindenberg and Apache 207	High & Hungrig 3	Bonez MC and Gzuz
16 May	"Anna"	RAF Camora	−	Ed Sheeran
23 May	"Tattoo"	Loreen	−	Ed Sheeran
30 May	"Bei Nacht"	RAF Camora featuring Cro	Fern von daheim	Andy Borg
6 June	"Friesenjung"	Ski Aggu featuring Joost and Otto Waalkes	Love Songs	Peter Fox
13 June	"Friesenjung"	Ski Aggu featuring Joost and Otto Waalkes	5-Star	Stray Kids
20 June	"Friesenjung"	Ski Aggu featuring Joost and Otto Waalkes	Gartenstadt	Apache 207
27 June	"Strada"	RAF Camora featuring Ahmad Amin	In Times New Roman...	Queens of the Stone Age
4 July	"Wien"	RAF Camora featuring Yung Hurn	XV	RAF Camora
11 July	"Wien"	RAF Camora featuring Yung Hurn	XV	RAF Camora
18 July	"So"	Bonez MC	Speak Now (Taylor's Version)	Taylor Swift
25 July	"Tropicana"	RAF Camora and HoodBlaq	XV	RAF Camora
1 August	"Mädchen auf dem Pferd"	Luca-Dante Spadafora, Niklas Dee and Octavian	XV	RAF Camora
8 August	"Mädchen auf dem Pferd"	Luca-Dante Spadafora, Niklas Dee and Octavian	Utopia	Travis Scott
15 August	"Mädchen auf dem Pferd"	Luca-Dante Spadafora, Niklas Dee and Octavian	Utopia	Travis Scott
22 August	"Mädchen auf dem Pferd"	Luca-Dante Spadafora, Niklas Dee and Octavian	Utopia	Travis Scott
29 August	"Mädchen auf dem Pferd"	Luca-Dante Spadafora, Niklas Dee and Octavian	Utopia	Travis Scott
5 September	"Mädchen auf dem Pferd"	Luca-Dante Spadafora, Niklas Dee and Octavian	Schwarzes Herz	Ayliva
12 September	"Mädchen auf dem Pferd"	Luca-Dante Spadafora, Niklas Dee and Octavian	Mädchen & Märchen	Die Draufgänger
19 September	"Mädchen auf dem Pferd"	Luca-Dante Spadafora, Niklas Dee and Octavian	XV	RAF Camora
26 September	"Mädchen auf dem Pferd"	Luca-Dante Spadafora, Niklas Dee and Octavian	Schwarzes Herz	Ayliva
3 October	"Strangers"	Kenya Grace	Reparatur	Josh.
10 October	"Strangers"	Kenya Grace	Autumn Variations	Ed Sheeran
17 October	"Greedy"	Tate McRae	Koa Garantie	Chris Steger
24 October	"Si No Estás"	Iñigo Quintero	Koa Garantie	Chris Steger
31 October	"Si No Estás"	Iñigo Quintero	Hackney Diamonds	The Rolling Stones
7 November	"Liebe Grüße"	RAF Camora and Ski Aggu	1989 (Taylor's Version)	Taylor Swift
14 November	"Now and Then"	The Beatles	Hackney Diamonds	The Rolling Stones
21 November	"Liebe Grüße"	RAF Camora and Ski Aggu	Rock-Star	Stray Kids
28 November	"Last Christmas"	Wham!	Ausklang	Seer
5 December	"Last Christmas"	Wham!	Ausklang	Seer
12 December	"All I Want for Christmas Is You"	Mariah Carey	Ausklang	Seer
19 December	"All I Want for Christmas Is You"	Mariah Carey	Ausklang	Seer
26 December	No Top 40 released			
