= Ambesa dentifera =

Scientific classification
- Domain: Eukaryota
- Kingdom: Animalia
- Phylum: Arthropoda
- Class: Insecta
- Order: Lepidoptera
- Family: Pyralidae
- Genus: Ambesa
- Species: A. dentifera

Binomial name
- Ambesa dentifera Neunzig, 2003

Species of moth

Ambesa dentifera is a species of snout moth that is endemic to California.
