= Tom Shaka =

American blues singer–songwriter

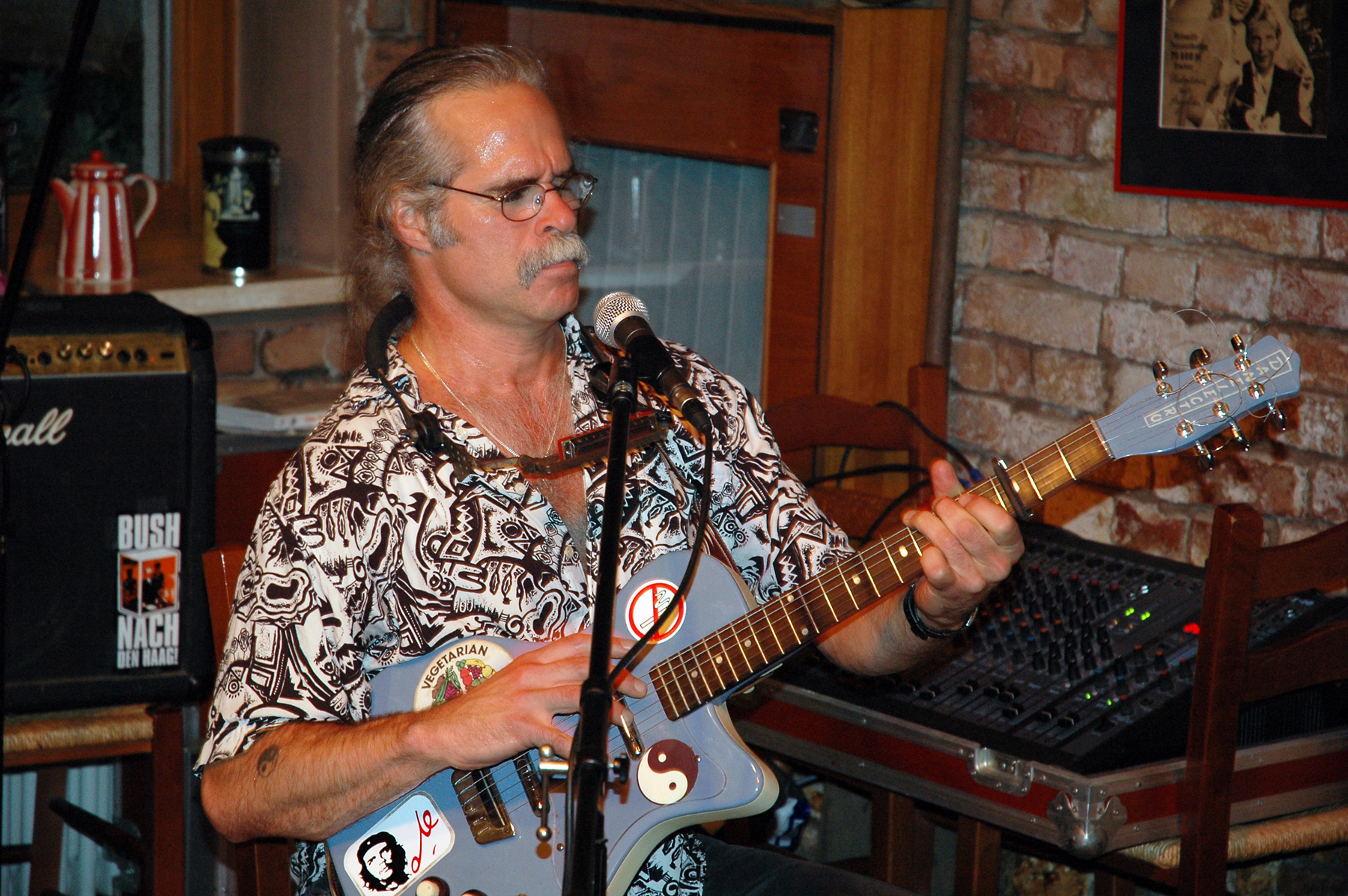
Tom Shaka

Tom Shaka (April 9, 1953, Middletown, Connecticut) is an American blues singer–songwriter.

In the 1970s he moved to Europe, and played in the Hamburg jazz club 'Onkel Pö', with musicians such as Udo Lindenberg, Louisiana Red, David Honeyboy Edwards, Abi Wallenstein and Al Jarreau. At the present time Shaka lives and works in the northwest German town Norderstedt, inside the Hamburg Metropolitan Region.

== Discography ==
=== Albums ===
- Hot'N Spicey (1994)
- Hit from the Heart (1994)
- Timeless in Blues (1995)
- Blues Magic (1997)
- The Shaka Brothers: Blues Blood (2000, together with Bill Shaka)
- Keep on Keepin on (2002)
- Bless my Soul (2002)
- The very Best of Tom Shaka (2003)
- Deep Cut (2007)
