= Ayliva =

German singer and musician (born 1998)

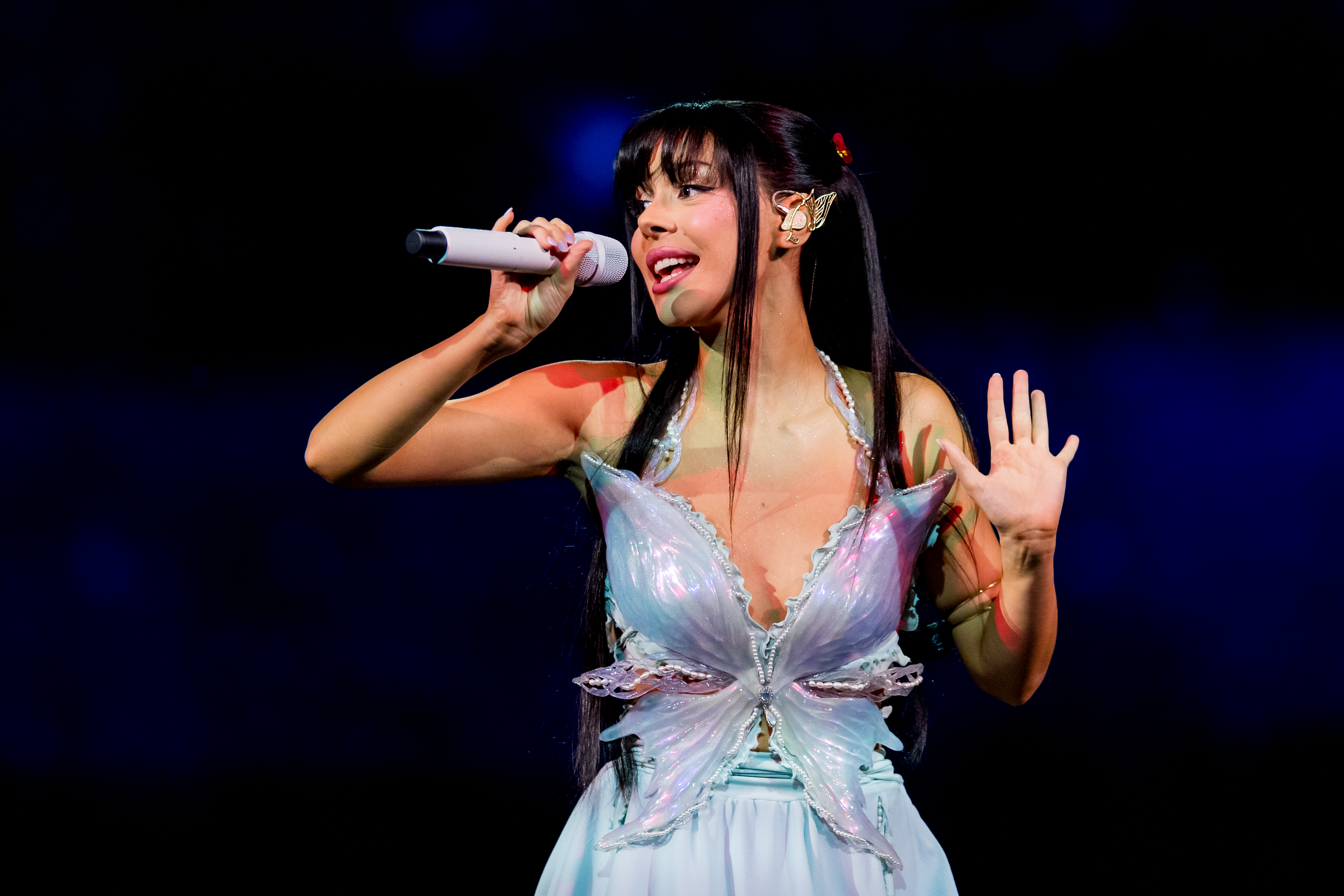
Ayliva in Mannheim (2024)

Ayliva (born Elif Akar, 4 April 1998 in Recklinghausen, Germany) is a German singer and musician. Her first single reached the German charts in 2021, and her success has continued since then including her second album Schwarzes Herz topping the German charts in 2023.

== Early life ==
Ayliva has Turkish roots and grew up in Recklinghausen with an older sister and younger brother. She learned guitar, keyboard, and violin, and started writing songs at the age of 10. After graduating from high-school, she studied philosophy and German studies at Ruhr University Bochum with the goal of becoming a teacher, and later on social work. She ended up quitting college to focus on her music career.

== Career ==
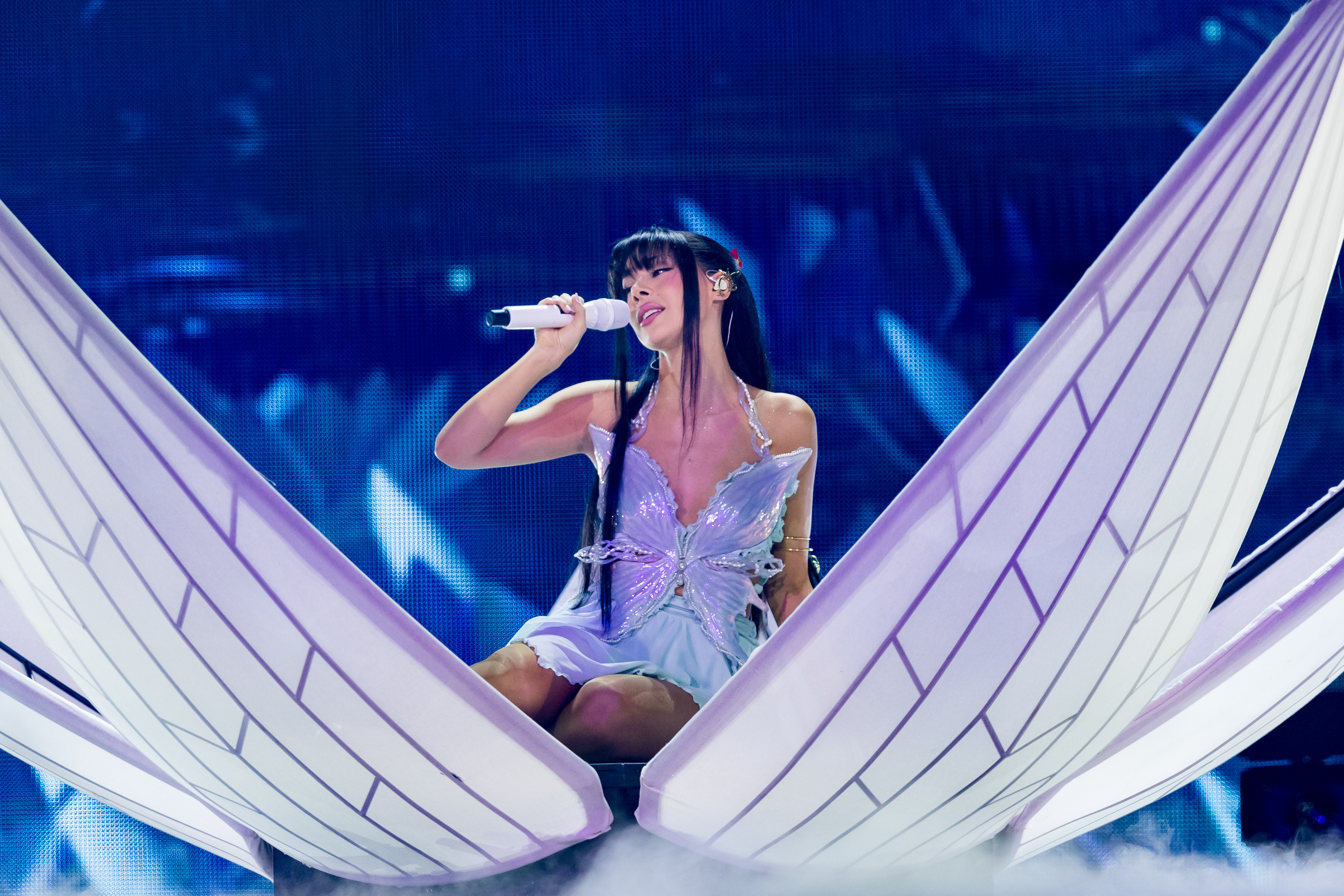
Ayliva in Mannheim (2024)

Starting in October 2020, Ayliva posted song samples on Instagram, Deine Heimfahrt being the first one. (Your Ride Home). She also began to post samples on TikTok. Her first single Deine Schuld (Your Fault) was released in March 2021 through Whiteheart Records, a division of Warner Music Group. The music video of the song, as well as the tiktok she posted about “Deine Schuld“ starts with a voice note of her ex-boyfriend threatening her and telling her not to release her song. The song reached number 16 in Germany. Her next single Wenn ich wein (When I Cry) was released in June 31 and reached 31 on the German charts. A new version of the song with the English title, with her a contributing a part in English, was released with Ali Gatie in November 2021. Another hit single was Schmetterlinge (Butterflies), in which the chorus is Arabic and the verses in German. Ayliva opened two shows for Alicia Keys in Germany in June 2022.

Her first album Weißes Herz (White Heart) was released in June 2022, and hit number 6 on the German album charts, and the single Bei Nacht (At Night) released number 13. In January 2023, she released Sie weiß (She Knows) with German rapper Mero, which reigned at number 1 in the German charts for two weeks, and stayed in the top three for nine more weeks; it was the number 3 song for the year 2023 in the German charts.

Her second album Schwarzes Herz (Black Heart) was released in August 2023, and reached number 1 in the charts in Germany, Austria, and Switzerland, and set streaming records for a female act in Germany. The album was the most streamed album on Spotify in Germany in 2023 (and Weißes Herz was 5th), and the album placed 7th in the German charts for the year -- and 3rd among German language albums. The song Hässlich (Ugly) from the album also went to number 1 in Germany, and some other tracks reached the top 10.

She won the Bambi Award for most successful female artist of the year in 2023.

In 2025, Ayliva became a coach on the thirteenth season of The Voice Kids.

== Discography ==
=== Albums ===
Title	Details	Peak chart positions			Certifications
Title	Details	GER	AUT	SWI	Certifications
Weißes Herz	Released: 8 July 2022; Label: Whiteheart; Formats: CD, digital download, streaming	6	9	11	BVMI: Gold; IFPI AUT: Gold
Schwarzes Herz	Released: 25 August 2023; Label: Whiteheart; Formats: CD, digital download, streaming	1	1	1	BVMI: Platinum; IFPI AUT: Gold; IFPI SWI: Gold
In Liebe	Released: 16 August 2024; Label: Whiteheart; Formats: CD, digital download, streaming	1	1	1	

=== Singles ===
List of singles as lead artist, with chart positions and certifications, showing year released and album name
Title	Year	Peak chart positions			Certifications	Album
Title	Year	GER	AUT	SWI	Certifications	Album
"Deine Schuld"	2021	16	49	54	BVMI: Gold; IFPI AUT: Platinum; IFPI SWI: Platinum	Weißes Herz
"Wenn ich wein"	2021	31	—	—	BVMI: Gold; IFPI AUT: Gold; IFPI SWI: Gold	Weißes Herz
"Immer kalt"	2021	—	—	—		Non-album singles
"Während du"	2021	—	—	—		Non-album singles
"When I Cry" (featuring Ali Gatie)	2021	—	—	—		Non-album singles
"Schmetterlinge"	2022	34	65	—	IFPI AUT: Gold; IFPI SWI: Gold	Weißes Herz
"Bleib" (featuring Milano)	2022	42	—	—	IFPI AUT: Gold	Weißes Herz
"Bei Nacht"	2022	13	19	59	BVMI: Gold; IFPI AUT: Platinum; IFPI SWI: Gold	Weißes Herz
"Was besseres" (featuring Mudi)	2022	67	—	—	IFPI AUT: Gold; IFPI SWI: Gold	Weißes Herz
"Sie weiß" (featuring Mero)	2023	1	1	3	BVMI: Platinum; IFPI AUT: 2× Platinum; IFPI SWI: 2× Platinum	Schwarzes Herz
"Was mir gefällt"	2023	7	16	55	IFPI AUT: Gold; IFPI SWI: Gold	Schwarzes Herz
"In deinen Armen"	2023	4	13	26	BVMI: Gold; IFPI AUT: Gold; IFPI SWI: Gold	Schwarzes Herz
"Aber sie"	2023	11	31	85		Schwarzes Herz
"Weißes Haus"	2023	6	6	6	BVMI: Gold; IFPI AUT: Gold; IFPI SWI: Gold	Schwarzes Herz
"Lieb mich"	2024	1	17	38		In Liebe
"Wunder" (featuring Apache 207)	2024	1	2	2	BVMI: Gold; IFPI AUT: Platinum; IFPI SWI: Platinum	In Liebe
"Beifahrer"	2024	7	26	49	IFPI AUT: Gold; IFPI SWI: Gold	In Liebe
"Nein!"	2024	3	24	92		In Liebe
"Wie?"	2025	2	3	4		TBA
"Renn!"	2026	1	7	15		TBA
"Für immer"	2026	5	27	55		TBA
"—" denotes releases that did not chart or were not released in that territory.
