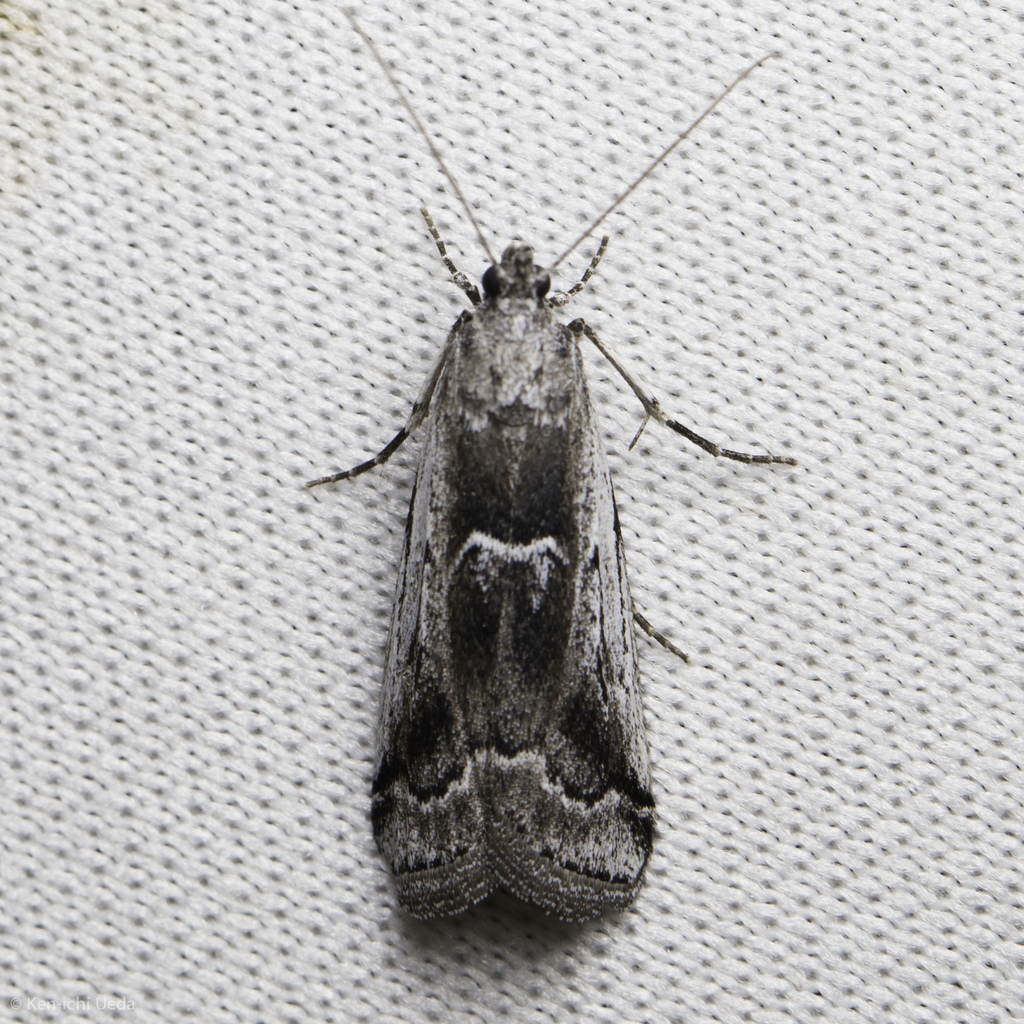

Scientific classification
- Domain: Eukaryota
- Kingdom: Animalia
- Phylum: Arthropoda
- Class: Insecta
- Order: Lepidoptera
- Family: Pyralidae
- Genus: Ambesa
- Species: A. walsinghami

Binomial name
- Ambesa walsinghami (Ragonot, 1887)

Synonyms
- Pristophora walsinghami Ragonot, 1887; Ambesa mirabella Dyar, 1908; Ambesa monodon Dyar, 1913

= Ambesa walsinghami =

Species of moth

Ambesa walsinghami is a species of snout moth in the genus Ambesa. It was described by Ragonot in 1887. It is found in the western North America.
