= Onkel Pö =

Music venue in Hamburg, West Germany

Onkel Pös Carnegie Hall
- Onkel Pö
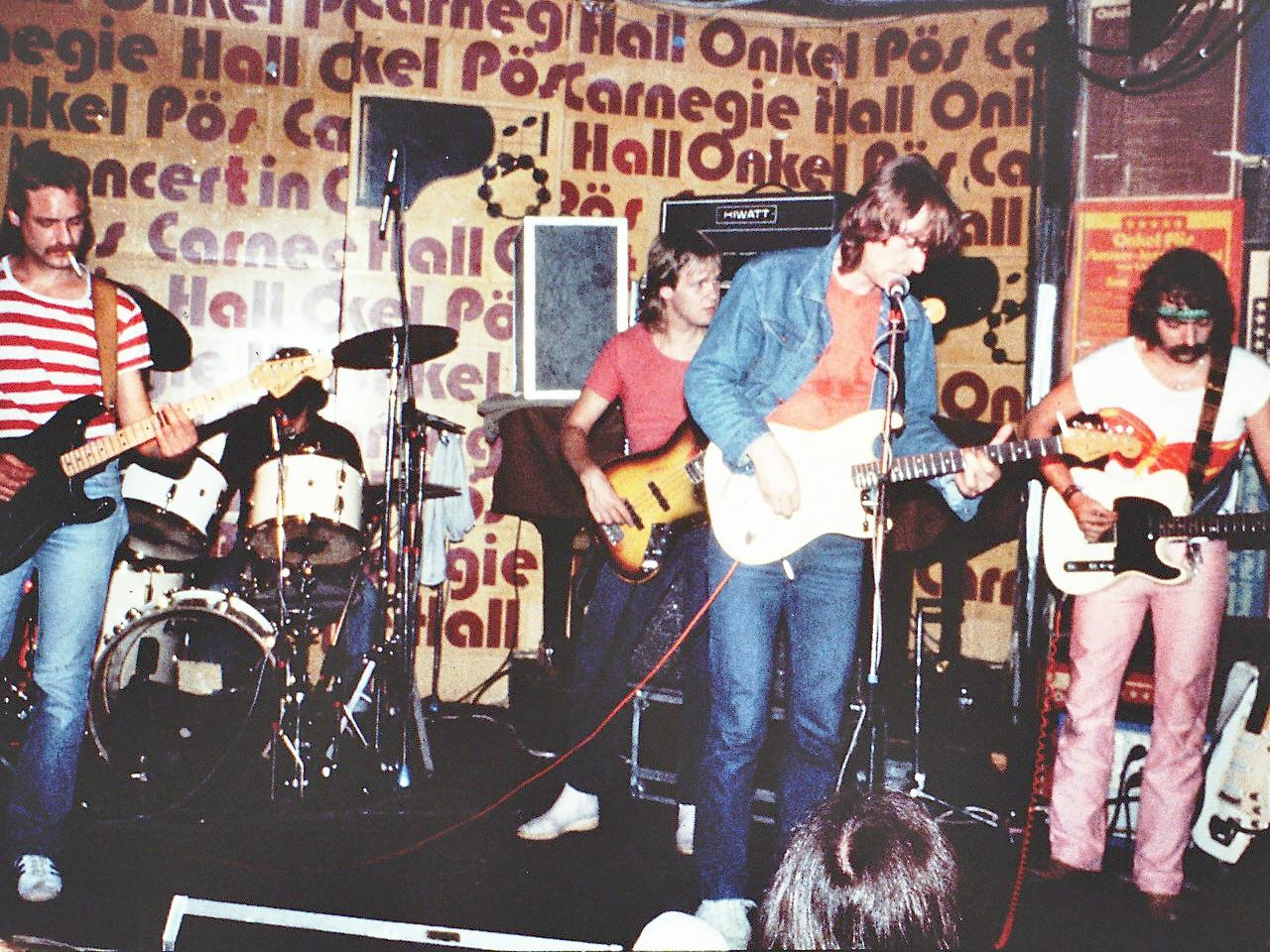
- Rainer Baumann Band, 29 August 1981
- Interactive map of Onkel Pös Carnegie Hall
- Address: Lehmweg 44, Hamburg
- Coordinates: 53°35′5″N 9°58′50″E
- Type: live music venue
- Events: Jazz, comedy
- Public transit: Eppendorfer Baum

Construction
- Opened: 1 October 1970
- Closed: 1 January 1986

Onkel Pös Carnegie Hall, better known as Onkel Pö, was a music venue in Hamburg in the 1970s and the early 1980s.

== Pöseldorf ==
Onkel Pö was originally a jazz venue in Mittelweg in the quarter Pöseldorf (in Rotherbaum) in Hamburg, and was opened by Bernd Cordua and Peter Marxen, who had previously opened the Jazzhouse, another jazz venue, in Brandstwiete. The name was chosen as a reference to Carnegie Hall in New York. The original venue has been occupied by the music pub Zwick since Onkel Pö moved to Eppendorf.

== Eppendorf ==
Soon after opening, on 1 October 1970, Onkel Pö moved to Lehmweg 44 in Eppendorf, where Ballhouse Eppendorf had been. Bernd Cordua left, and it was run by Peter Marxen on his own.

From 1975, Onkel Pö was one of the venues of the Jazz Festival in Hamburg, which was called New Jazz Festival at the time. To make the festival a success, the musicians, including Albert Mangelsdorff, Wolfgang Dauner and Gerd Dudek played for reduced remuneration.

Among the jazz musicians who played at Onkel Pö were John Abercrombie, Chet Baker, Art Blakey, Carla Bley, James Booker, Joanne Brackeen, Dollar Brand, Michael Brecker, Gary Burton, Don Cherry, Chick Corea, Gil Evans, Jan Garbarek, Dizzy Gillespie, Steve Goodman, Dexter Gordon, Charlie Haden, Louis Hayes, Joe Henderson, Bobby Hutcherson, Leo Kottke, Steve Kuhn, Dave Liebman, Michael Mantler, Pat Metheny, Alphonse Mouzon, Marvin "Hannibal" Peterson, Tom Shaka, Woody Shaw, Archie Shepp, Horace Silver, Ralph Towner, Bennie Wallace, Mike Westbrook, Yōsuke Yamashita, and Attila Zoller. Al Jarreau and Helen Schneider started their international careers there.

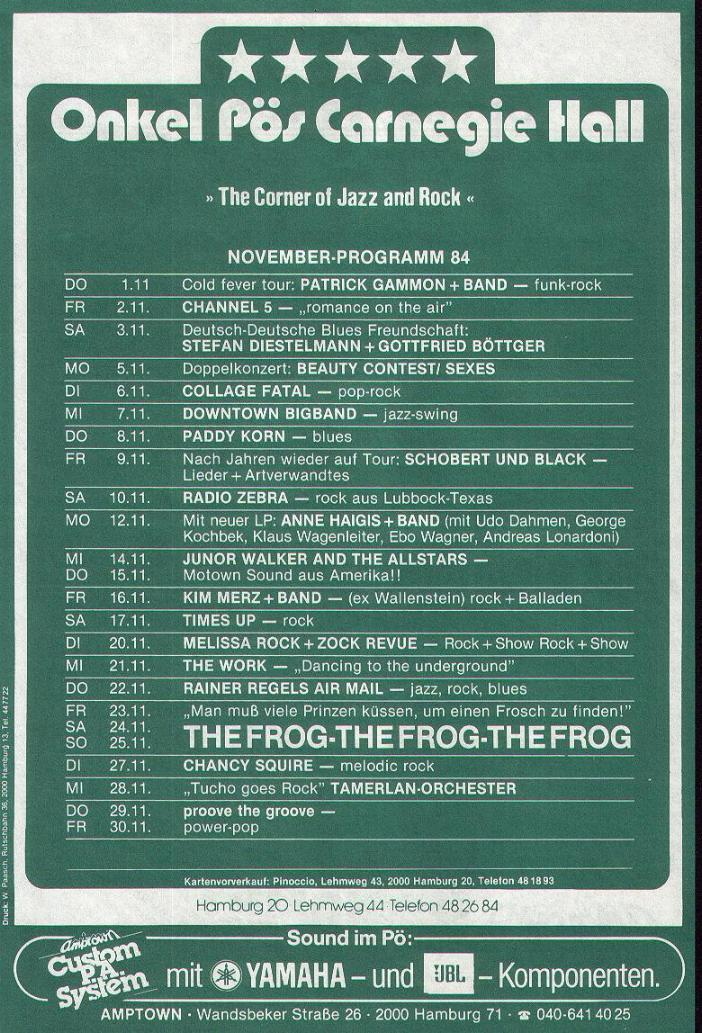
Onkel Pö's Program Flyer, November 1984

On 12 March 1976, Al Jarreau played for the first of three evenings in Onkel Pö. The concert on the second evening was broadcast live on Norddeutscher Rundfunk (NDR) radio, and Al Jarreau was signed up for a television show, The Al Jarreau Show.

The television talk show in NDR, NDR Talk Show, was recorded in Onkel Pö, but moved back to the studios because Peter Marxen refused to allow Arno Breker in as a guest.

New Wave Bands such as Talking Heads and the Roundheads performed in Onkel Pö.

== Closure ==
In 1979, Marxen left to take over Forsthaus Hessenstein, a restaurant near Lütjenburg. His successor, Holger Jass, changed Onkel Pö from the Corner of Jazz to a Corner of Jazz and Rock. Andreas Kiel was responsible for the programme until Onkel Pö closed at 8 a.m. on 1 January 1986. The restaurant which took over the venue was called Legendär (German: Legendary), but since 1 November 2006, it is used by the Schweinske chain of restaurants.

Bernd Cordua tried without much success to open various venues with the name Onkel Pö.

== Cultural references ==
The German singer Udo Lindenberg mentioned the venue in his album Alles klar auf der Andrea Doria with the lines Im Onkel Pö spielt ´ne Rentnerband seit zwanzig Jahren Dixieland... in the song Alles klar auf der Andrea Doria.

British singer Tom Robinson mentions this establishment in his song "Atmospherics: Listen to the Radio", which was covered by Toronto's Pukka Orchestra on their self-titled debut album.

A 60-minute documentary film Eppendorf’s Cavern – The Legendary Onkel Pö (original German title Die Höhle von Eppendorf - Das legendäre Onkel Pö) was directed by Oliver Schwabe and featured in the Filmfest Hamburg in 2016.
