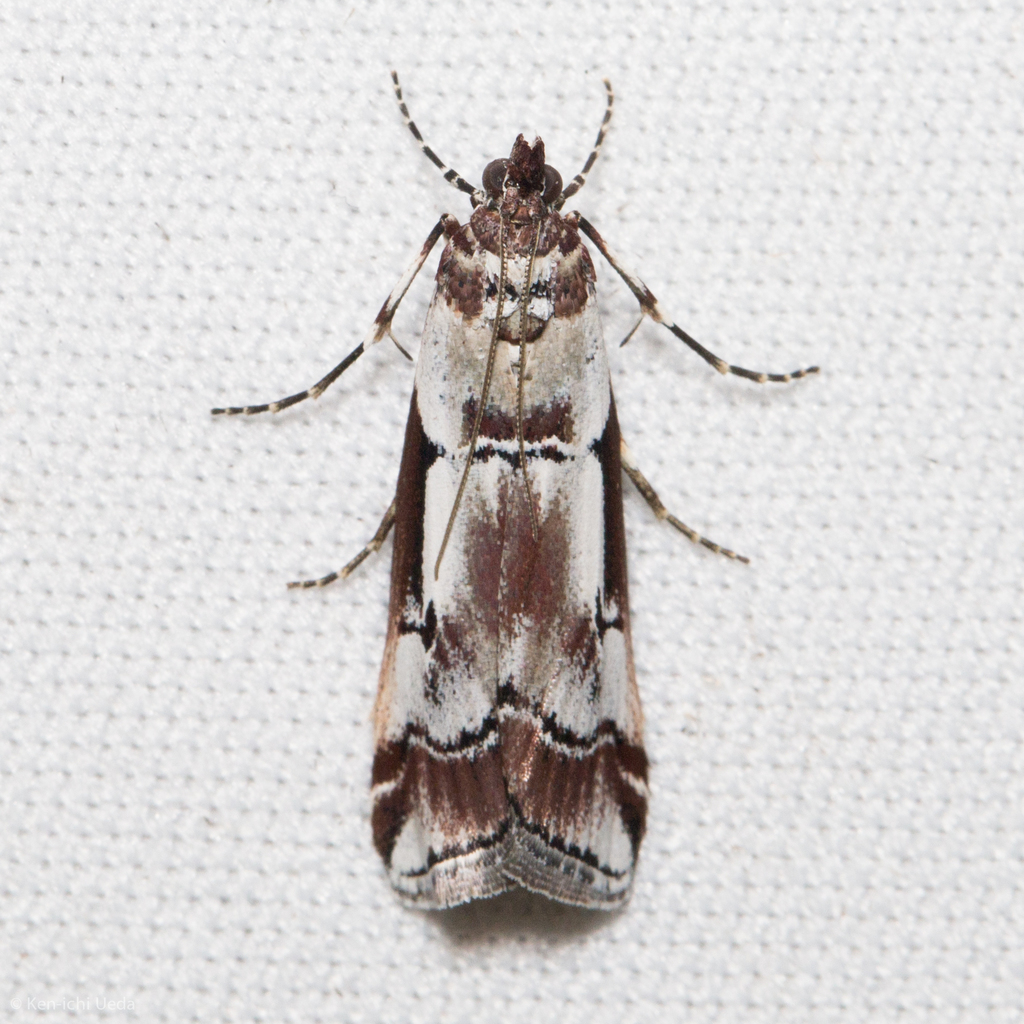

Scientific classification
- Kingdom: Animalia
- Phylum: Arthropoda
- Class: Insecta
- Order: Lepidoptera
- Family: Pyralidae
- Genus: Ambesa
- Species: A. laetella

Binomial name
- Ambesa laetella Grote, 1880

= Ambesa laetella =

Species of moth

Ambesa laetella is a species of snout moth. It is found in North America.
