= Sonderzug nach Pankow =

Single by Udo Lindenberg

from the album Odyssee
- Language: German
- B-side: "Sternentaler"
- Released: February 2, 1983
- Length: 3:31 (album version); 3:01 (single version)
- Label: Polydor
- Songwriters: Harry Warren; Mack Gordon; Udo Lindenberg
- Producer: Udo Lindenberg

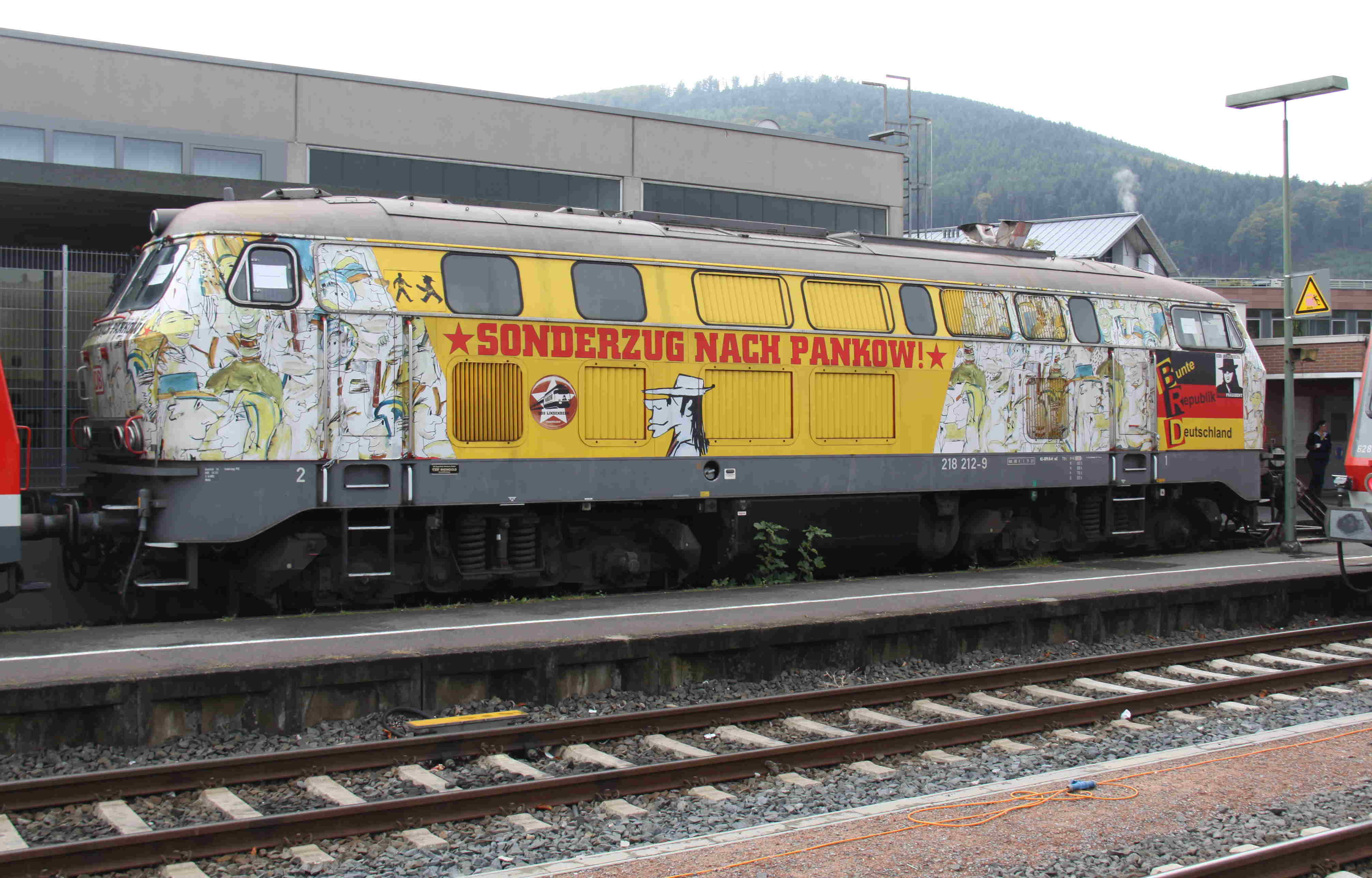
Diesel Locomotive DB Class 218, with a Sonderzug nach Pankow-themed paint job, at Miltenberg Station, 2012

"Sonderzug nach Pankow" (German: [ˈzɔndɐˌtsuːk naːx ˈpaŋkoː], lit. 'Special Train to Pankow') is a song by German rock singer Udo Lindenberg, released as a single on 2 February 1983. It was written in response to the East German administration's rejection of his wish to perform a concert there as a West German. The song's lyrics refer directly to East German leader Erich Honecker, who took offense to the song. The melody is based on the 1941 swing classic "Chattanooga Choo Choo" by Glenn Miller.

== Origin ==
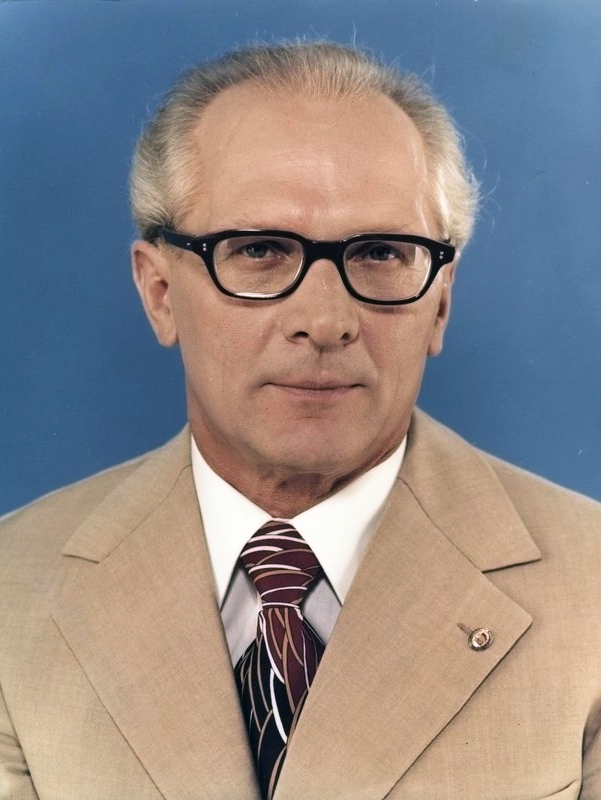
Erich Honecker

In a radio interview with Sender Freies Berlin on 5 March 1979, Lindenberg expressed a wish to give a concert in East Berlin, the Soviet sector of Berlin. The interview was recorded in East Germany and presented one day later as information from the State Committee for Broadcasting, Monitor Department, to the SED's chief ideologist and cultural officer, Kurt Hager. On 9 March 1979, Hager handwrote on the release: "An appearance in the GDR is out of the question". Four years later, in response to this rejection, Lindenberg wrote a German lyric insulting the leader of East Germany, Erich Honecker, and set it to the 1941 Glenn Miller song "Chattanooga Choo Choo". Honecker is portrayed as an ossified and hypocritical man who officially endorses the ideology of the Soviet government, but is inside a rocker and secretly listens to western radio.

== Title and lyrics ==
The title's reference to the District of Pankow, Berlin, is based on the fact that during the Cold War, "Pankow" was synonymous with the seat of government of the Soviet-occupied zone. The Schönhausen Palace in Pankow was the location of the seat of president from 1949 to 1960, followed by the State Council of East Germany until 1964. The adjacent Majakowskiring seated the representatives of the East German Government until their move to Wandlitz. At the end of the song, a station announcement can be heard, spoken in Russian. It says: "Tоварищ Эрих, между прочим, Верховный Совет не имеет ничего против гастролей господина Линденберга в ГДР!" (in English: "Comrade Erich, by the way, the Supreme Soviet has nothing against Mr Lindenberg's tour of the GDR!"), a further insult to Honecker.

== Release ==
=== Reception ===
This song remained in the West German music charts from 19 March 1983 to 6 May 1983 for seven weeks, spending four weeks at number five. The reaction to the song led to the first and only concert by Lindenberg in East Germany, on 25 October 1983. The concert took place during the Rock für den Frieden ("Rock for Peace") festival in Berlin's Palast der Republik, but Lindenberg was not allowed to sing this song then. A planned tour through East Germany in the following year was cancelled. "Sonderzug nach Pankow" became a cult song in East Germany and is one of Lindenberg's most famous songs.

=== Letter ===
Lindenberg wrote a letter to Honecker on 16 February 1983, enclosing the song in the envelope. The letter read: "Let a real German plain-language rocker rock the GDR. Show yourself from your easy-going and flexible side, show us your humour and your sovereignty and let the nightingale of Billerbeck raise her magic voice. Don't look at it so narrowly and pinchedly, comrade Honey, and give your okay for my GDR tour."

== Political reception ==
The disrespectful song lyrics upset Honecker. In August 1983, Lindenberg's advisor Michael Gaißmayer wrote a letter in an attempt to clear the air. Free German Youth (FDJ) leader Egon Krenz then invited Lindenberg to play four of his songs at an FDJ peace concert with artists from all over the world at the Palace of the Republic in East Berlin.

On 25 October 1983, Lindenberg gave his first and only performance in the GDR until the Fall of the Berlin Wall. It took place at the Rock for Peace festival in front of 4,200 people in the Palace of the Republic, but Lindenberg did not sing "Sonderzug nach Pankow" at the request of the GDR leadership. A tour of the GDR planned by Lindenberg for the following year did not take place; the guest tour was finally cancelled in February 1984.

Lindenberg's line in the song that Honecker secretly also liked to wear leather jackets came true in 1987. He sent Honecker a leather jacket that year, which was answered by Honecker with a thank-you letter in which he described rock music as compatible with the ideals of the GDR. Furthermore, Honecker wrote that he would pass the leather jacket on to the Central Council of the FDJ so that they could give it to a rock fan. The letter also included a shawm as a gift for Lindenberg. Honecker had played this instrument during his youth. When Honecker was in Wuppertal on 9 September 1987 during a state visit, Lindenberg gave him an electric guitar with the inscription "Gitarren statt Knarren". (Guitars instead of guns.)
