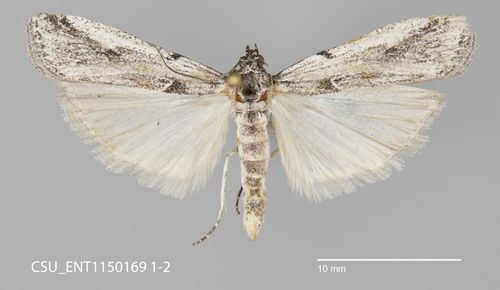

Scientific classification
- Domain: Eukaryota
- Kingdom: Animalia
- Phylum: Arthropoda
- Class: Insecta
- Order: Lepidoptera
- Family: Pyralidae
- Genus: Ambesa
- Species: A. lallatalis

Binomial name
- Ambesa lallatalis (Hulst, 1886)

Synonyms
- Nephopteryx lallatalis Hulst, 1886

= Ambesa lallatalis =

Species of moth

Ambesa lallatalis is a species of snout moth in the genus Ambesa. It was described by George Duryea Hulst in 1886. It is found in North America, including California and Utah.
