= Ambesa =

Scientific classification
- Domain: Eukaryota
- Kingdom: Animalia
- Phylum: Arthropoda
- Class: Insecta
- Order: Lepidoptera
- Family: Pyralidae
- Subfamily: Phycitinae
- Genus: Ambesa; Grote, 1880

Genus of moths

Ambesa is a genus of snout moths. It was described by Augustus Radcliffe Grote in 1880.

== Species ==
- Ambesa dentifera Neunzig, 2003
- Ambesa laetella Grote, 1880
- Ambesa walsinghami (Ragonot, 1887)
- Ambesa lallatalis (Hulst, 1886)
