= Komet (song) =

Single by Udo Lindenberg and Apache 207

from the album Gartenstadt
- Language: German
- Released: 19 January 2023
- Genre: Pop rock
- Length: 2:47
- Label: Warner
- Songwriters: Christopher Brenner; Lennard Oestmann; Marco Tscheschlok; Aris Pehlivanian; Udo Lindenberg; Volkan Yaman
- Producers: Jumpa; SIRA

Udo Lindenberg singles chronology
"Mittendrin" (2021)	"Komet" (2023)

Apache 207 singles chronology
"Nie mehr gehen" (2022)	"Komet" (2023)	"Breaking Your Heart" (2023)

Music video
- "Komet" on YouTube

"Komet" (German pronunciation: [koˈmeːt]; transl. "Comet") is a song by German singer Udo Lindenberg and rapper Apache 207. It was released on 20 January 2023 by Warner as the lead single from the latter's upcoming second studio album Gartenstadt.

After debuting at number two in Germany, the song went on to reach number one in its second week, holding the top spot for 21 non-consecutive weeks. In doing so, the song became the longest-running number-one song of all time in Germany, even tying the record of longest running number-one songs predating the current chart publishing. Additionally, Lindenberg achieved his first number-one song in his over-50-year career, while Apache earned his eleventh number-one on the chart. It also topped the Austrian charts in April 2023.

== Background ==
The collaboration came about after Lindenberg visited an Apache 207 concert. According to him, the rapper left a lasting impression, calling Apache a "stand-out" among other "Gangsta-rap" artists. Likewise, the latter attended a concert of Lindenberg in Mannheim that year. Both decided to team up and work on music. Shortly after its release, the duo was able to name a star of Perseus after the song.

In wake of its instant success, Lindenberg claimed to be surprised by the gigantic numbers the song consistently pulled. While he expected the song to be a hit, he had not expected the "dimension" it would eventually take on.

== Composition ==
"Komet" starts out with Lindenberg's trademark ad-libs during the intro and devolves into a "fiery" chorus sung by Apache, who is later joined by Lindenberg. Lyrically, the Pop rock song is a "tribute to life", accompanied by "nostalgic" 1980s Synth-sounds.

== Commercial performance ==
For the chart dated 27 January 2023, the song debuted at number two on the German Singles Charts behind "Flowers" by Miley Cyrus. The song reached number one in its second week, having so far topped the chart for 21 weeks in total. In doing so, "Komet" became the longest-running number-one song of all time, surpassing the previous record held by "Rivers of Babylon" (1978) by Boney M. and "Despacito" (2017) by Luis Fonsi and Daddy Yankee. Additionally, the song accumulated 120 million streams across all platforms in its first three months.

== Music video ==
The accompanying music video was released on 20 January 2023. It starts with a bar fight initiated by Apache after he spotted a man drugging drinks. He is then seen being put on trial with Lindenberg acting as a lawyer. Other charges include dangerous interference with road traffic, assault, property damage and theft; all of which can be seen as flashbacks during the video. Scenes of the trial were filmed at Hanseatisches Oberlandesgericht. Apache is eventually sentenced to house arrest at the Hotel Atlantic in Hamburg, where both he and Lindenberg are seen smoking cigars.

== Charts ==
=== Weekly charts ===
Weekly chart performance for "Komet"
Chart (2023)	Peak position
Austria (Ö3 Austria Top 40)	1
Germany (GfK)	1
Switzerland (Schweizer Hitparade)	2

=== Year-end charts ===
2023 year-end chart performance for "Komet"
Chart (2023)	Position
Austria (Ö3 Austria Top 40)	2
Germany (GfK)	1
Switzerland (Schweizer Hitparade)	3

2024 year-end chart performance for "Komet"
Chart (2024)	Position
Germany (GfK)	8

== Certifications ==
Certifications for "Komet"
Region	Certification	Certified units/sales
Austria (IFPI Austria)	3× Platinum	90,000^{‡}
Germany (BVMI)	2× Platinum	1,200,000^{‡}
Switzerland (IFPI Switzerland)	4× Platinum	80,000^{‡}
^{‡} Sales+streaming figures based on certification alone.

== See also ==
- List of number-one hits of 2023 (Austria)
- List of number-one hits of 2023 (Germany)
