= Roller (Apache 207 song) =

2019 single by Apache 207

Single by Apache 207

from the EP Platte
- Language: German
- Released: 23 August 2019
- Length: 2:37
- Label: Four Music; TwoSides
- Songwriter: Volkan Yaman
- Producers: Lucry; Suena

Apache 207 singles chronology
"2 Minuten" (2019)	"Roller" (2019)	"200 km/h" (2019)

Music video
- "Roller" on YouTube

"Roller" (German pronunciation: [ˈʁɔlɐ]; transl. "Scooter") is a song recorded by German rapper Apache 207. The song was released by Four Music and TwoSides on 23 August 2019, as the lead single from Apache's debut EP Platte. The song was written by Apache 207 and produced by Lucry and Suena.

The song reached number one in Germany in its second week on the chart, becoming the rapper's first number-one hit there. It also went on to become the most streamed song in Germany in 2019. Additionally, the song peaked in the top-10 of the charts in Austria and Switzerland. In March 2020, the song was awarded the most successful record of 2019 by the academy of the German Music Authors' Prize, hosted by GEMA.

== Critical reception ==
The editors of 16Bars stressed the song's use of "unique vocal efforts" paired with "catchy melodies" and Apache's "authentic showmanship". Laut.de praised the song for showcasing Apache's trademark qualities, including a "catchy hook" and "a good portion of self-deprecation".

== Commercial performance ==
The song debuted at number two in Germany, behind Capital Bra's and Samra's Nummer eins, becoming the rapper's highest charting single. In its second week, for the chart dated 6 September 2019, the song reached number one. The song was certified diamond by the BVMI in July 2020, exceeding one million certified units in Germany. In doing so, the song became only the fourth German rap song to reach that threshold. By 30 September 2020, the song had amassed 221 million streams on Spotify, surpassing Rammstein's "Du hast" (1997) as the most streamed German song of all time on the streaming service.

== Music video ==
The accompanying music video was released on 23 August 2019. It mainly features the rapper, dressed in white Nike socks and sneakers, with his crew (mainly consisting of his real life friends) riding motorcycles. He gets the USB Stick for his EP Platte stolen by a gang. Later, with a jump he kicks the thief off his scooter. The scene, allegedly resembling a scene from a german series "Die Ruhrpottwache" featuring Smolik, is filmed at the bft gas station in Speyer, near his hometown Ludwigshafen. The final scene shows Apache running through a street in Mannheim while also alluding to the title of his then upcoming debut EP Platte. The video surpassed 40 million views by the end of 2019.

== Personnel ==
Credits adapted from Tidal.

- Apache 207 – vocals, songwriting
- Lucry – composition, production, mixing engineering
- Suena – composition, production, mixing engineering
- Lex Barkey – mastering engineering

== Charts ==
=== Weekly charts ===
Chart (2019)	Peak position
Austria (Ö3 Austria Top 40)	2
Germany (GfK)	1
Switzerland (Schweizer Hitparade)	4

=== Year-end charts ===
Chart (2019)	Position
Austria (Ö3 Austria Top 40)	8
Germany (GfK)	3
Switzerland (Schweizer Hitparade)	32

Chart (2020)	Position
Austria (Ö3 Austria Top 40)	6
Germany (GfK)	3
Switzerland (Schweizer Hitparade)	22

Chart (2021)	Position
Austria (Ö3 Austria Top 40)	65
Germany (GfK)	30

Chart (2022)	Position
Germany (GfK)	64

Chart (2023)	Position
Austria (Ö3 Austria Top 40)	75
Germany (GfK)	26

Chart (2024)	Position
Germany (GfK)	96

== Certifications ==
Region	Certification	Certified units/sales
Austria (IFPI Austria)	5× Platinum	150,000^{‡}
Germany (BVMI)	9× Gold	1,800,000^{‡}
Switzerland (IFPI Switzerland)	3× Platinum	60,000^{‡}
^{‡} Sales+streaming figures based on certification alone.

== See also ==
- List of number-one hits of 2019 (Germany)
