= Katja Krasavice =

German singer and rapper

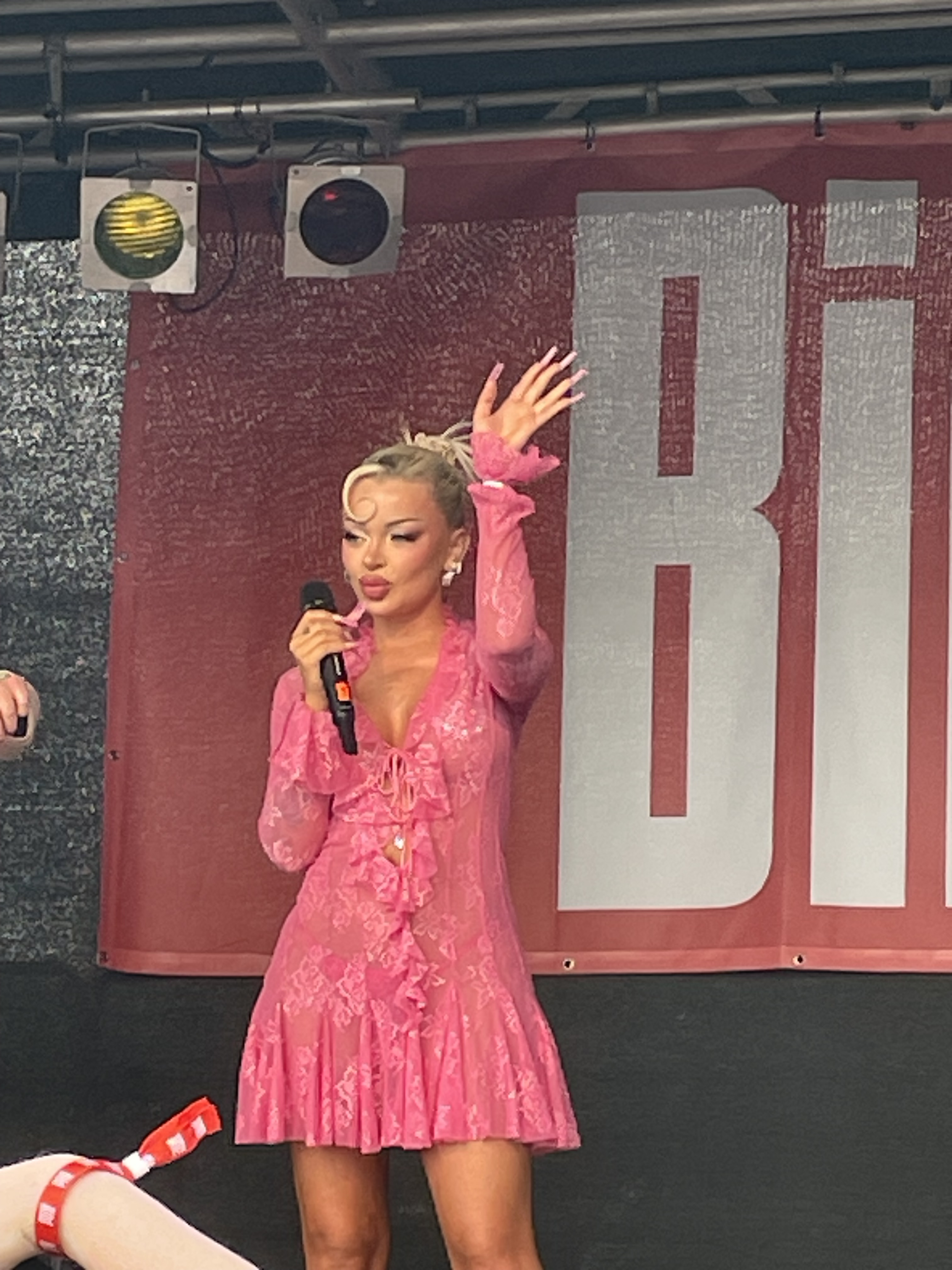
- Krasavice in 2024

Background information
- Born: Katrin Vogelová; 10 August 1996 (age 30); Teplice, Czech Republic
- Origin: Liebschütz, Germany
- Genres: Dance pop; trap; German hip hop; R&B; pop; dirty rap
- Occupations: Singer; rapper; YouTuber
- Years active: 2014-present
- Label: Warner Music Group
- Website: katja-krasavice.de

Katrin Vogelová (born 10 August 1996), better known by her stage name Katja Krasavice, is a German and Czech singer, rapper, and former YouTuber.

== Personal life ==
Katja Krasavice was born on August 10, 1996, in Teplice, to a Czech mother and a Slovak father. While Krasavice was still a baby, the family moved to Liebschütz in Germany. At the age of 5, Krasavice lost her brother who suffered from thigh cancer. This incident caused her father to become an alcoholic and mistreat her mother. At the age of 11, she lost her other brother who committed suicide in prison. At a later point in her life, Krasavice testified in court against her father who sexually assaulted her friends. As a coping mechanism for her trauma, Krasavice developed an image based around her own sexual expression. Later in school, Krasavice was the victim of excessive bullying. She attended a Gymnasium but did not graduate.

== Career ==
=== Early career on YouTube ===
Katja Krasavice opened up her YouTube channel on March 29, 2014. With her revealing outfits, unabashed embracement of porn culture, role as an advocate for plastic surgery, and no holds barred open talk about sexuality, preferences, and techniques, Krasavice initially became known as "the sex-YouTuber" ("die Sex-YouTuberin") through her vlogs. Not without controversy, she quickly developed a big following, gathering 100000 subscribers in 2015 and 500000 in 2016. In 2018, Katja's online presence received so much attention that she participated in the sixth season of Promi Big Brother (Celebrity Big Brother) where she came in sixth place. In 2019, Krasavice removed all of her videos from her channel after making the decision of pursuing music as her main career and opening a new channel for that purpose. Her dead channel currently holds 1.43 million subscribers. Ever since, Krasavice has refused to be called a YouTuber anymore.

=== 2017-2018: The Stard Ova singles ===
In November 2017, while still an active YouTuber, Katja released her debut single Doggy, a light hearted sex themed novelty dance song produced by Stard Ova, along with a comical music video. The single became a top ten hit in Germany and Austria, peaking at numbers 7 and 5, respectively. In April 2018, her second single Dicke Lippen was released, kept in a similar style. The song topped the charts in Austria and peaked at number 4 in Germany. In August the same year, Sex Tape served as her third single, peaking at numbers 6 and 7 in Germany and Austria. All three Stard Ova produced songs were in tone with her YouTube content and built up on her internet hype.

=== 2019-2020: Bo$$ Bitch and Bitch Bible ===
In 2019, Katja Krasavice decided to pursue music as her major career and signed a contract with Warner Music Group, and announced the release of her debut album Bo$$ Bitch for January the following year. Her new musical style is more contemporary R&B-, trap-, and dancehall-inspired, with lyrics involving around self-representation and sexuality. The album's first single Gucci Girl, based on an interpolation of Aqua's Barbie Girl, peaked at number 21 on the German and Austrian charts. The next two singles Sugar Daddy and Wer bist du failed to enter the charts in either country, while the fourth and final single Casino peaked at number 44 in Germany. The album ultimately debuted at number 1 on the German charts, beating Eminem's Music To Be Murdered By in the two albums' release week, and entered the top ten in Austria and Switzerland.

In June 2020, Krasavice released her autobiographical book Bitch Bibel, which introduced the broader public to her tragic backstory. The book became a bestseller and peaked at number 2 on the non-fiction book charts of Der Spiegel.

=== 2020-2021: Eure Mami and Saweetie & Doja Cat collaboration ===
In 2020, Krasavice released the first single of her second album Eure Mami, Million Dollar A$$, together with German rapper Fler. The dirty rap song peaked at number 3 on the German charts, her best chart position so far. The two follow up pop singles, Ich seh and Alles schon gesehen, marked a notable departure from her previous style, featuring a melancholic tone and reflecting on past relationships and tragedies that occurred in her own life. Neither of these songs managed to gain commercial success.

On January 8, 2021, she released the album's fourth single Highway, together with German singer Elif. It features a poppier and more melodious outfit and continued the string of insightful reflective lyricism from her previous two singles. The song was a big commercial success and became Krasavice's first number 1 hit on the German charts.

On January 29, Krasavice's second album Eure Mami came out, accompanied by a new single, the dance pop song Friendzone, released on the same day. Her sophomore record covers a broader musical and thematic scope than her debut album, ranging from hip hop to pop, from singing to rapping and from dirty lyrics to vulnerable moments. The album topped the German and Austrian charts, while the single peaked at number 2 in Germany.

In April 2021, American rappers Saweetie and Doja Cat released a number of international remixes of their collaborative song Best Friend, featuring female rappers from different parts of the world and picking Katja Krasavice as the guest artist for the German version of the song. While the original version previously received no commercial success in the German market, the Katja Krasavice remix debuted at number 1, thus becoming her second chart topper, and the first for both Saweetie and Doja Cat.

=== 2021-2022: Pussy Power and Dieter Bohlen & Pietro Lombardi collaboration ===
In September 2021, Krasavice premiered the title song of her third album Pussy Power. A porn rap song with drill elements expressing female sexuality, it became her third number 1 single in Germany. The second single off the album followed in November in the form of the bilingual breakup dance pop song Raindrops featuring German singer Leony. It was a commercial success, becoming her fourth number 1 hit in Germany. The third single of the album, the ballad Narben feat. Marwin Balsters, hit number 12 on the German charts. In February 2022, the album Pussy Power dropped after a delay caused by the last minute removal of one song from the tracklist due to it featuring rapper Haiyti who received backlash for alleged homophobic remarks. Like her previous albums, it entered at number 1 in Germany, with the simultaneously released single OnlyFans, a bouncy trap pop song, hitting number 2 on the song charts. The album also hit number 1 on the Austrian charts.

In May 2022, Katja Krasavice released a German language cover version of the Modern Talking classic You're My Heart, You're My Soul together with original band member Dieter Bohlen and German pop singer Pietro Lombardi. The song entered at number 2 on the German charts.

=== 2022-2023: Deutschland sucht den Superstar, feud with Dieter Bohlen and Ein Herz für Bitches ===
Between 2022 and 2023, Krasavice acted as a judge on the 20th season of the talent search show Deutschland sucht den Superstar, the German branch of the Pop Idol franchise, next to her former collaborators Dieter Bohlen, Leony and Pietro Lombardi. During the run of the season, Krasavice publicly spoke out against Bohlen's treatment of and remarks about female contesters on the show and particularly about Jill Lange, calling them outdated and sexist in a TikTok statement. Bohlen replied by attacking Katja Krasavice for her musical quality, which caused her to reveal private messages of Bohlen praising her for her music and asking to be featured on her then-upcoming You're My Heart, You're My Soul remake. Katja furthermore released a diss track on social media platforms but not commercially. In the finale of the show, Krasavice notably did not pay attention to a stage performance by Bohlen as a protest, recording and sending a voice message during the song. When announcing the 21st season of Deutschland sucht den Superstar at a concert, Bohlen promised to the audience a "better jury", which was widely interpreted by the media to be a stab at Krasavice. The feud culminated in the release of the lead single Frauen of Krasavice's upcoming 2023 album Ein Herz für Bitches. The music video to the feminist power anthem pop song features a body double that resembles Dieter Bohlen being bound and gagged, while also starring Jill Lange, who was also announced to be a featured artist on the album. The song entered and peaked at number 2 on the German charts. The follow up single, the Felix Jaehn collaboration Ich hab den schönsten Arsch der Welt, an alternative perspective cover of the 2000s dance pop hit Du hast den schönsten Arsch der Welt by Alex C. & Y-ass, peaked at number 7 in Germany. The album's third single Neonlights with singer Luna failed to enter the German charts.

=== 2024: Fifth number one hit ===
In 2024, Katja Krasavice appeared on the dance pop song One Night Stand together with rapper Finch and producers Luca-Dante Spadafora and Niklas Dee. It became the latter two's second, Finch's first and Krasavice's fifth number one hit on the German charts.

== Public image ==
Early in her career, Krasavice's videos and songs were almost universally panned by fellow YouTubers and critics alike, and frequently received a high amount of dislikes. Often she was criticized for setting herself up in an erotic or straight up softcore pornographic manner to get commercial and public attention, especially considering she attracted a generally younger viewership due to her videos not being age-restricted. Although having released much-viewed videos and already having had well-charting songs, she received a considerable amount of hate and ridicule for both her web videos and early music, especially during her Stard Ova era.

In 2020, after the release of her first album, Krasavice wrote and released her bestselling autobiographical book Bitch Bible, which for the first time revealed her troubled past toward a wider audience. It details how the deaths and absence of family members affected and shaped her into who she became and gave insight into why she chose her controversial image. The book received thoroughly positive reviews from fans and critics alike, painting a more personal image of a woman who remained strong despite constant backlash and tragedies, and partly re-evaluated her public image into a more complex and varied artistic figure. It was also after the release of her book that she covered a wider palette of topics and genres in her music.

== Discography ==
=== Studio albums ===
Title	Album details	Peak chart positions		
Title	Album details	GER	AUT	SWI
Boss Bitch	Released: 17 January 2020; Label: Warner Music Group; Formats: CD, digital download, streaming, box set	1	2	5
Eure Mami	Released: 29 January 2021; Label: Warner Music Group; Formats: CD, digital download, streaming, box set	1	1	—
Pussy Power	Released: 11 February 2022; Label: Warner Music Group; Formats: CD, digital download, streaming, box set	1	1	6
Ein Herz für Bitches	Released: 1 September 2023; Label: Warner Music Group; Formats: CD, digital download, streaming, box set	1	62	25

=== Singles ===
==== As lead artist ====
Title	Year	Peak chart positions			Certifications	Album
Title	Year	GER	AUT	SWI	Certifications	Album
"Doggy"	2017	7	5	26		Non-album singles
"Dicke Lippen"	2018	4	1	12		Non-album singles
"Sex Tape"	2018	6	7	41		Non-album singles
"Gucci Girl"	2019	21	21	80		Boss Bitch
"Sugar Daddy"	2019	—	—	—		Boss Bitch
"Wer bist du"	2019	—	—	—		Boss Bitch
"Casino"	2019	44	—	—		Boss Bitch
"Million Dollar A$$" (featuring Fler)	2020	3	39	73		Eure Mami
"Ich seh"	2020	—	—	—		Eure Mami
"Alles schon gesehen"	2020	—	—	—		Eure Mami
"Highway" (featuring Elif)	2021	1	18	77		Eure Mami
"Friendzone"	2021	2	—	—		Eure Mami
"Pussy Power"	2021	1	—	—		Pussy Power
"Raindrops" (featuring Leony)	2021	1	33	—		Pussy Power
"Narben" (featuring Marwin Balsters)	2021	12	—	—		Pussy Power
"Onlyfans"	2022	2	16	—		Pussy Power
"You're My Heart, You're My Soul" (with Dieter Bohlen & Pietro Lombardi)	2022	2	43	—		Non-album singles
"Frauen"	2023	2	39	—		Ein Herz für Bitches
"Ich hab den schönsten Arsch der Welt" (with Felix Jaehn)	2023	7	—	—		Ein Herz für Bitches
"Neonlights" (featuring Luna)	2023	—	—	—		Ein Herz für Bitches
"One Night Stand (ONS)" (with Finch, Luca-Dante Spadafora & Niklas Dee)	2024	1	—	—		Non-album singles
"Reiche Tante"	2025	—	—	—		Bundeskanzlerin
"Pasta"	2025	—	—	—		Bundeskanzlerin
"Multimillionärin"	2025	—	—	—		Bundeskanzlerin
"Bitch" (with Ikkimel)	2026	33	31	—		Bundeskanzlerin

==== As featured artist ====
Title	Year	Peak chart positions			Certifications	Album
Title	Year	GER	AUT	SWI	Certifications	Album
"Best Friend (Remix)" (Saweetie featuring Doja Cat & Katja Krasavice)	2021	1	51	96		Best Friend (feat. Doja Cat) [Remix EP]
"Bad Bitch" (Eunique featuring Katja Krasavice)	2021	—	—	—		Non-album single

== Filmography ==
=== Television ===
- 2018: Promi Big Brother (as Participant)
- 2023: Deutschland sucht den Superstar (as Judge)

=== Music videos ===
- 2019: Nura — "Was ich meine"
- 2022: Twenty4Tim — "Bling Bling"

== Awards and nominations ==
=== Results ===
Year	Award	Nomination	Work	Result	Ref.
2019	Bravo Otto Awards	YouTube / Social Media	Herself	Gold	
2020	Bravo Otto Awards	Hip-Hop National	Herself	Nominated	
2020	HipHop.de Awards	Best Video National	Million Dollar A$$ (feat. Fler)	Nominated	
2021	HipHop.de Awards	Best Video National	Pussy Power	Nominated	
2021	Bravo Otto Awards	Hip-Hop National	Herself	Bronze	
2022	Bravo Otto Awards	Hip-Hop National	Herself	Bronze	
2023	Glamour Awards (DE)	Musician of the Year	Herself	Won	
2023	Bravo Otto Awards	Rap/Hip-Hop National	Herself	Nominated	
2024	Bravo Otto Awards	Rap/Hip-Hop National	Herself	Nominated	

== Tours ==
=== Headliner ===
- 2020: Bo$$ Bitch Tour (some dates cancelled due to COVID-19 pandemic)
- 2022: Eure Mami Tour (rescheduled due to COVID-19 pandemic)

== Publications ==
- Krasavice, Katja (June 2020). Die Bitch Bibel: Sei kein Opfer und sie werden dich anbeten. riva, München. ISBN 978-3-96775-002-7.
