= Íñigo Quintero =

Spanish singer-songwriter (born 2001)

Iñigo Quintero

Background information
- Born: Íñigo Quintero Dolz del Castellar; 12 December 2001 (age 24); A Coruña, Spain
- Genres: Pop, latin pop
- Occupations: Singer; songwriter
- Years active: 2022–present
- Label: Acqustic
- Website: iñigoquintero.com

Íñigo Quintero Dolz del Castellar (born 12 December 2001) is a Spanish singer-songwriter. He is best known for his single "Si No Estás".

== Biography ==
Quintero's parents come from the municipality of Pontedeume, where they currently run a pharmacy. He has seven siblings: Ana, Bosco, Carlos, Jaime, Jorge, Josemaría and Pablo. He studied at the Colegio de Fomento Peñarredonda in A Coruña.

He released his debut single "Si No Estás" in September 2022. The song garnered international attention about a year later through TikTok, reaching the top position on multiple national charts including Spain, Austria, France, Germany, Luxembourg, the Netherlands, Norway, Sweden, and Switzerland, and peaked at fifth on the Billboard Global 200. On 23 October 2023 it became the world number one on Spotify, becoming the first track by a solo Spanish artist to achieve this. Quintero has since released several more singles including: "Sobredosis", "Será por ti", "Sin tiempo para bailar" and "Lo Que Queda de Mí" all in 2023. On the 19th of April 2024, he released his first EP entitled "ES SOLO MÚSICA". On the 24th of October 2025, he released his first album entitled "El Sitio de Siempre".

== Discography ==
=== Singles ===
- "Si No Estás" (2022)
- "Sobredosis" (2023)
- "Será por ti" (2023)
- "Sin tiempo para bailar" (2023)
- "Lo Que Queda de Mí" (2023)
- "CLASICO" (2024)
- "El Tiempo Que Paso Contigo" (2024)
- "Extranjero" (2025)
- "Despedida" (2025)
- "Bajo Control" (2025)

=== Albums & EPs ===
- "ES SOLO MÚSICA" (2024)
- "El Sitio de Siempre" (2025)

== Album & EP Track Listings ==
ES SOLO MUSICA Track Listing
| No. | Title | Writer(s) | Producer(s) | Length |
|---|---|---|---|---|
| 1 | Desconocido | Íñigo Quintero Dolz del Castellar • Raul Gomez | Paco Salazar • Francisco Javier Ojanguren García • Sebastián Cortés Galindo | 2:53 |
| 2 | Nada Cambia | Quintero • Gomez | Salazar | 2:58 |
| 3 | Si No Estás | Quintero | Íñigo Quintero Dolz del Castellar | 3:04 |
| 4 | El Equilibrio | Quintero | Salazar | 4:00 |
| 5 | Lo Que Queda de Mí | Quintero • Francisco Javier Ojanguren García • Paco Salazar | Quintero • García • Salazar | 3:50 |

El Sitio de Siempre Track Listing
| No. | Title | Writer(s) | Producer(s) | Length |
|---|---|---|---|---|
| 1 | Amor | Íñigo Quintero Dolz del Castellar • Javy Imbroda • Pablo Imbroda | Paco Salazar | 2:46 |
| 2 | El Pacto | Quintero • Francisco Javier Ojanguren García • Tim Sommers • Cole Miracle • Bonnie Dymond | Juan Guevara | 2:22 |
| 3 | Despedida | Quintero • Raul Gomez • German Gonzalo Duque | Mango • Salazar | 2:23 |
| 4 | Estrella Fugaz | Quintero | Salazar | 3:47 |
| 5 | Bajo Control | Quintero • Aroa Lorente Rodruíguez | Salazar | 3:36 |
| 6 | La Torre Más Alta de la Ciudad | Quintero | Salazar | 3:28 |
| 7 | Todo el Tiempo del Mundo | Quintero • Javy Imbroda • Pablo Imbroda | Salazar | 3:23 |
| 8 | Extranjero | Quintero • Andres Vasquez • Alejandro Ochoa • Felipe Galat • Liam Garner | Salazar | 2:32 |
| 9 | Siempre Lo Mismo | Quintero • García • Ignacio Lacarra Martín | Salazar | 3:40 |
| 10 | El Tiempo Que Paso Contigo (with Besmaya) | García • Javier Echávarri Trillo • Quintero | Javier Ojanguren • Salazar | 3:10 |
| 11 | El Sitio de Siempre | Quintero | Salazar | 3:28 |
