= Si No Estás =

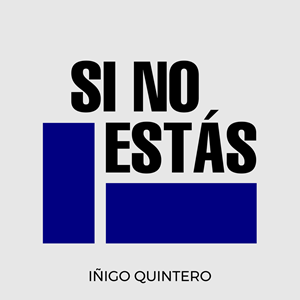

Single by Íñigo Quintero

from the EP Es Solo Música
- Language: Spanish
- English title: "If You're Not Here"
- Released: 23 September 2022
- Length: 3:04
- Label: Acqustic
- Songwriter: Íñigo Quintero
- Producer: Íñigo Quintero

Íñigo Quintero singles chronology
"Si No Estás" (2022)	"Sobredosis" (2023)

Lyric video
- "Si No Estás" on YouTube

"Si No Estás" (transl. "If You're Not Here") is a song by Spanish musician Íñigo Quintero, released as his debut single on 23 September 2022 through Acqustic. It is Quintero's breakthrough single, peaking at number one in Spain, Austria, France, Germany, Luxembourg, the Netherlands, Norway, Sweden, and Switzerland. It additionally entered the top 10 in Belgium and Italy and on the Billboard Global 200, and reached the top 40 in Denmark and Finland.

The song first received attention after becoming viral on TikTok in Spain, soon after the song would extend to Latin American TikTok, where it surged in popularity reaching the top-ten spot in Argentina, Bolivia, Ecuador, and Peru (where it reached the number one spot). Outside the Spanish-speaking world, "Si No Estás" started to appear in European charts, where the single became a success and reached the top ten in Denmark, Greece, Hungary, Italy, and Slovakia.

== Background ==
Self-written and self-produced by the 22-year-old from A Coruña, Quintero first released "Si No Estás" in 2022. However, it did not garner attention until September 2023, a full year later, through TikTok. Snippets of the song widely show clips of people in relationships expressing their mutual love for each other. The song generally talks about heartbreak and features lyrical elements of spirituality and "finding oneself through religion".

== Charts ==
=== Weekly charts ===
Weekly chart performance for "Si No Estás"
Chart (2023–2024)	Peak position
Argentina (Argentina Hot 100)	9
Argentina (CAPIF)	5
Austria (Ö3 Austria Top 40)	1
Belgium (Ultratop 50 Flanders)	2
Belgium (Ultratop 50 Wallonia)	1
Bolivia (Billboard)	3
Canada (Canadian Hot 100)	94
Chile (Monitor Latino)	14
Chile (Billboard)	15
Colombia (Billboard)	14
Costa Rica (FONOTICA)	15
Czech Republic Singles Digital (ČNS IFPI)	11
Denmark (Tracklisten)	8
Dominican Republic (Monitor Latino)	3
Ecuador (Billboard)	5
Ecuador (Monitor Latino)	2
Finland (Suomen virallinen lista)	36
France (SNEP)	1
Germany (GfK)	1
Global 200 (Billboard)	5
Greece International (IFPI)	2
Hungary (Single Top 40)	10
Ireland (IRMA)	36
Israel (Mako Hitlist)	98
Italy (FIMI)	2
Lithuania (AGATA)	31
Luxembourg (Billboard)	1
Netherlands (Dutch Top 40)	17
Netherlands (Single Top 100)	1
North Africa (IFPI)	9
Norway (VG-lista)	1
Paraguay (Monitor Latino)	2
Paraguay (SGP)	57
Panama (PRODUCE)	14
Panama (Monitor Latino)	3
Peru (Billboard)	1
Poland (Polish Streaming Top 100)	26
Portugal (AFP)	2
Slovakia Singles Digital (ČNS IFPI)	8
Spain (Promusicae)	1
Sweden (Sverigetopplistan)	1
Switzerland (Schweizer Hitparade)	1
UK Singles (Official Charts)	90
UK Indie (Official Charts)	42
Uruguay (Monitor Latino)	11
US Hot Latin Songs (Billboard)	34
Venezuela (Monitor Latino)	7

=== Year-end charts ===
2023 year-end chart performance for "Si No Estás"
Chart (2023)	Position
Austria (Ö3 Austria Top 40)	54
Belgium (Ultratop 50 Wallonia)	70
Germany (Official German Charts)	71
Hungary (Single Top 40)	48
Netherlands (Dutch Top 40)	76
Netherlands (Single Top 100)	54
Switzerland (Schweizer Hitparade)	18

2024 year-end chart performance for "Si No Estás"
Chart (2024)	Position
Belgium (Ultratop 50 Flanders)	75
Belgium (Ultratop 50 Wallonia)	20
France (SNEP)	17
Global 200 (Billboard)	114
Switzerland (Schweizer Hitparade)	18

== Certifications ==
Certifications for "Si No Estás"
Region	Certification	Certified units/sales
Denmark (IFPI Danmark)	Gold	45,000^{‡}
France (SNEP)	Diamond	333,333^{‡}
Italy (FIMI)	2× Platinum	200,000^{‡}
Portugal (AFP)	6× Platinum	60,000^{‡}
Spain (Promusicae)	6× Platinum	360,000^{‡}
Streaming
Greece (IFPI Greece)	Gold	1,000,000^{†}
^{‡} Sales+streaming figures based on certification alone.^{†} Streaming-only figures based on certification alone.
