= Apache 207 =

German rapper

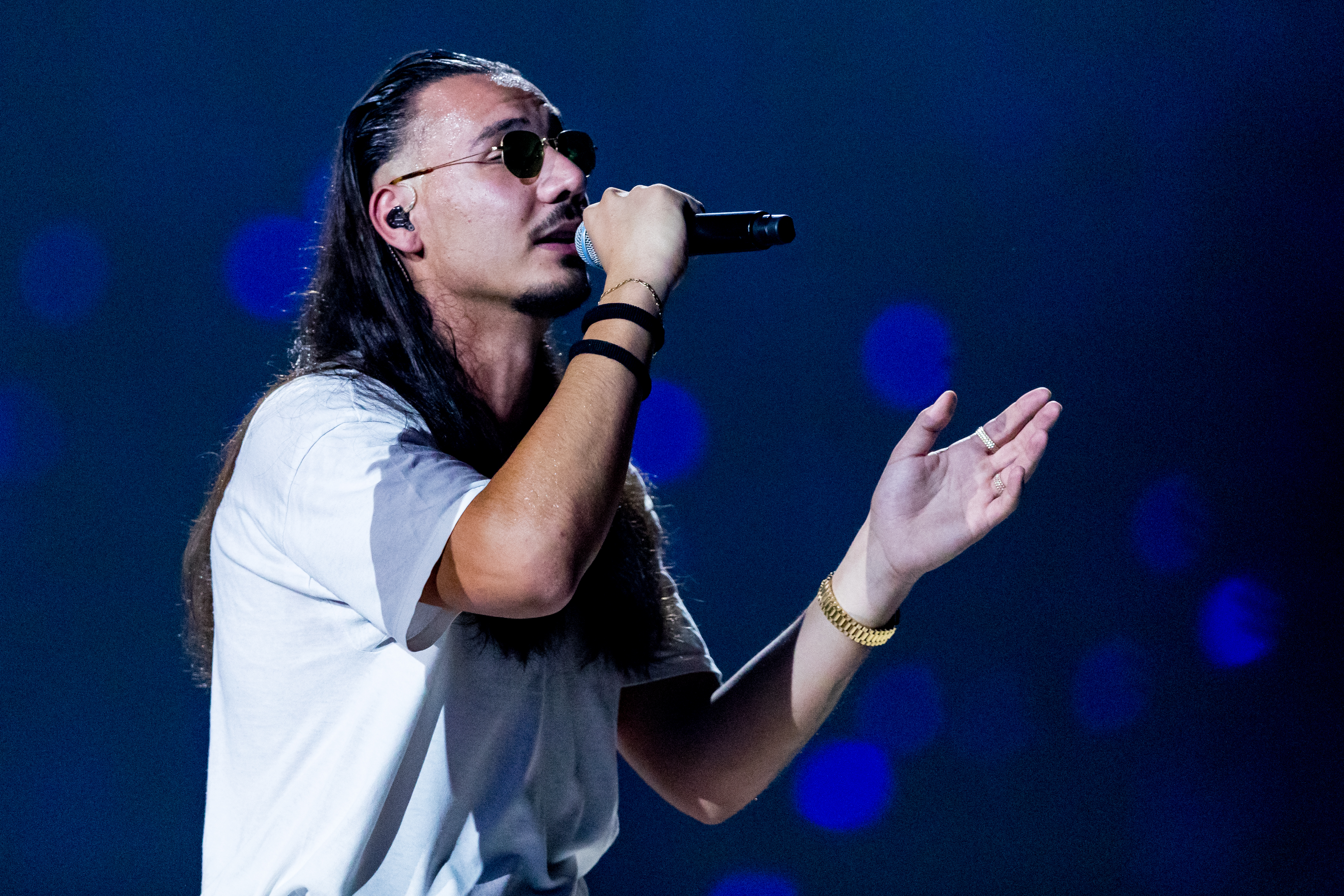
- Apache 207 at the SAP Arena in Mannheim, 2022

Background information
- Born: Volkan Yaman; 23 October 1997 (age 28); Mannheim, Baden-Württemberg, Germany
- Genres: Hip hop; pop; cloud rap
- Occupations: Rapper; singer
- Instrument: Vocals
- Years active: 2017–present
- Label: TwoSides
- Website: apache207.de

Volkan Yaman (German: [ˈfɔlkaːn ˈjamaːn], Turkish: [voɫˈkan jaˈman]; born 23 October 1997), known professionally as Apache 207, is a German rapper and singer of Turkish descent from Ludwigshafen. He became best known for his breakthrough hit "Roller" in August 2019, which would be the first of several more Top 10 hits.

== Life and career ==
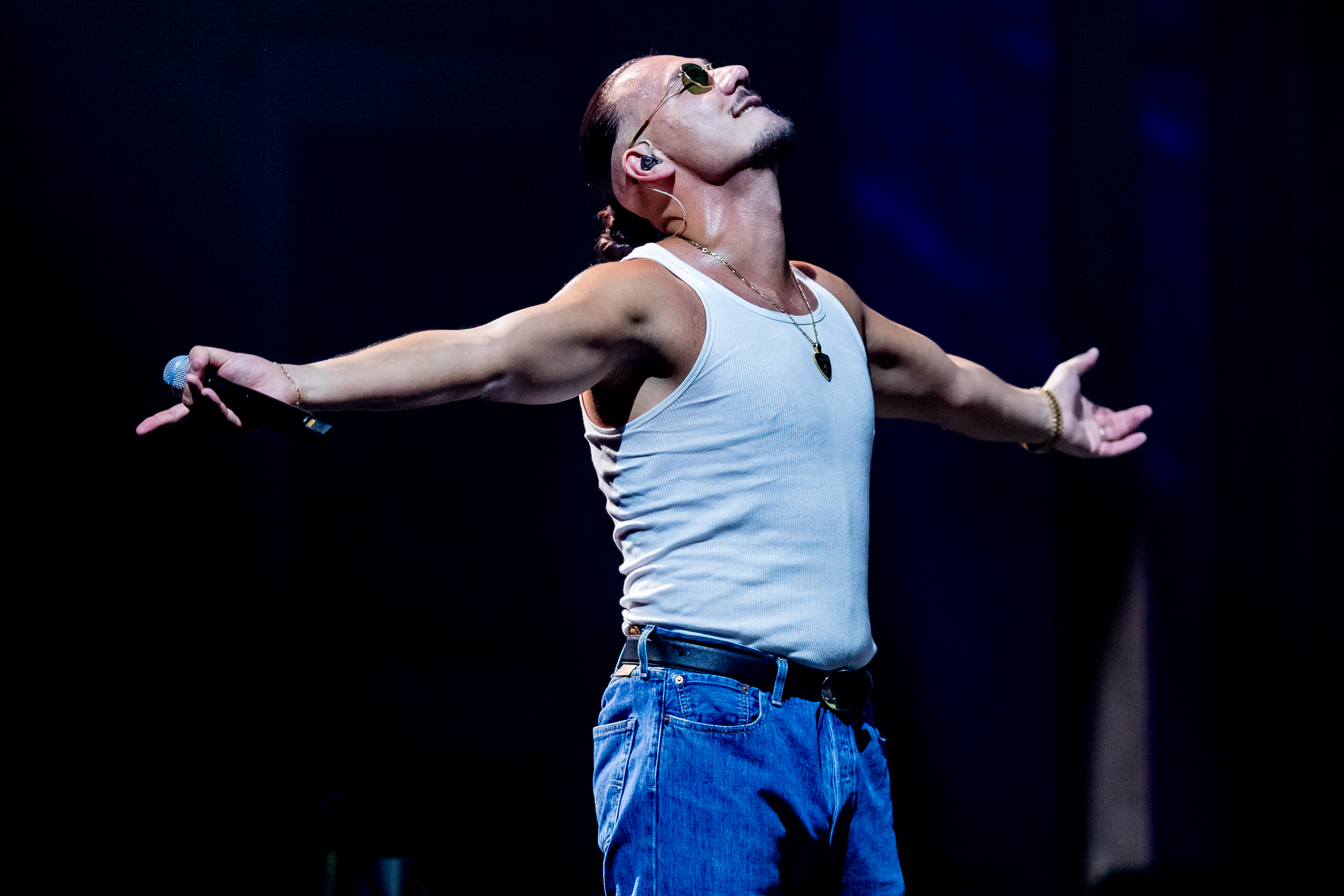
Apache 207 at the SAP Arena in Mannheim, 2022

Yaman was born in Mannheim, Germany, to a Turkish family who had migrated from the province of Yozgat. He finished high school in 2017 with A-Levels in Ludwigshafen. The rapper started his mainstream career in June 2018 when he released his debut single "Kleine Hure" without label backing. The song was followed up by seven other singles, released over the course of six months. In early 2019, he was signed to musician Bausa's label TwoSides. The first single to be released under the label was "Kein Problem" in April 2019. Initially, the song garnered little attention and did not peak in Germany until late October 2019, at 17. However, the song's music video reached over eight million clicks on YouTube in the following months. In May 2019, he earned his first chart entry in Germany with the release "Brot nach Hause". Even though the single "2 Minuten" climbed up to 35 in Germany, his chart success remained moderate. On 23 August 2019, he released "Roller" which would debut at number two. In the following week, it reached number one on the chart. In Austria and Switzerland, the song peaked within the Top 10. His follow-up releases "200 km/h" and "2002" with Sido became Top 10 hits as well. He achieved his second number one in Germany with the single "Wieso tust du dir das an?" in October 2019. His first EP Platte was released on 25 October 2019.

== Discography ==
=== Albums ===
Title	Details	Peak chart positions			Certifications
Title	Details	GER	AUT	SWI	Certifications
Treppenhaus	Released: 31 July 2020; Label: TwoSides; Formats: CD, Digital download, streaming	1	1	1	BVMI: Gold; IFPI SWI: Gold
2sad2disco	Released: 10 December 2021; Label: TwoSides; Formats: Digital download, streaming	56	38	60	
Gartenstadt	Released: 9 June 2023; Label: TwoSides; Formats: CD, vinyl, digital download, streaming	1	1	2	BVMI: Gold

=== EPs ===
Title	Details	Peak chart positions			Certifications
Title	Details	GER	AUT	SWI	Certifications
Platte	Released: 25 October 2019; Label: TwoSides; Formats: CD, digital download, streaming	4	4	11	BVMI: Platinum; IFPI SWI: Platinum

=== Singles ===
==== As lead artist ====
Title	Year	Peak chart positions				Certifications	Album
Title	Year	GER	AUT	SWI	WW	Certifications	Album
"Kleine Hure"	2018	—	—	—	—	IFPI AUT: Gold	Non-album singles
"Sag mir wer"	2018	—	—	—	—		Non-album singles
"Ferrari Testarossa"	2018	—	—	—	—	IFPI AUT: Gold	Non-album singles
"No No"	2018	—	—	—	—		Non-album singles
"Sidechickz"	2018	—	—	—	—		Non-album singles
"Durch die Straßen"	2018	—	—	—	—		Non-album singles
"Famous"	2018	—	—	—	—	IFPI AUT: Gold	Non-album singles
"Kein Problem"	2019	17	59	—	—	BVMI: Platinum; IFPI AUT: Platinum; IFPI SWI: Gold	Non-album singles
"Brot nach Hause"	2019	49	—	—	—	BVMI: Gold; IFPI AUT: Gold; IFPI SWI: Gold	Non-album singles
"Nicht wie du"	2019	54	—	—	—		Non-album singles
"2 Minuten"	2019	35	—	—	—	BVMI: Gold; IFPI AUT: Gold	Non-album singles
"Roller"	2019	1	2	4	—	BVMI: 9× Gold; IFPI AUT: 7× Platinum; IFPI SWI: 3× Platinum	Platte
"200 km/h"	2019	4	7	11	—	BVMI: 2× Platinum; IFPI AUT: 3× Platinum; IFPI SWI: Platinum	Platte
"Wieso tust du dir das an?"	2019	1	4	4	—	BVMI: 3× Gold; IFPI AUT: 2x Platinum; IFPI SWI: Platinum	Platte
"Matrix"	2020	2	3	14	—	BVMI: Gold; IFPI AUT: Gold; IFPI SWI: Gold	Treppenhaus
"Fame"	2020	1	1	1	—	BVMI: 3× Gold; IFPI AUT: 2x Platinum; IFPI SWI: Platinum	Treppenhaus
"Boot"	2020	1	2	4	—	BVMI: Platinum; IFPI AUT: Platinum; IFPI SWI: Gold	Treppenhaus
"Bläulich"	2020	1	1	3	—	BVMI: 3× Gold; IFPI AUT: 2x Platinum; IFPI SWI: Platinum	Treppenhaus
"Unterwegs"	2020	1	6	6	—	BVMI: Gold; IFPI AUT: Gold; IFPI SWI: Gold	Treppenhaus
"Angst"	2021	1	3	2	191	BVMI: Gold; IFPI AUT: Platinum	Non-album single
"2sad2disco"	2021	7	24	18	—		2sad2disco
"Vodka"	2021	1	12	13	—	IFPI AUT: Gold	2sad2disco
"Thunfisch & Weinbrand"	2021	13	30	21	—		2sad2disco
"Sport"	2021	10	44	26	—	BVMI: Gold; IFPI AUT: Gold	2sad2disco
"Fühlst du das auch"	2022	6	9	8	—	BVMI: Gold; IFPI AUT: Gold	Non-album singles
"Nie mehr gehen"	2022	29	61	71	—		Non-album singles
"Komet" (with Udo Lindenberg)	2023	1	1	2	142	BVMI: 3× Platinum; IFPI AUT: 3× Platinum; IFPI SWI: 4x Platinum	Gartenstadt
"Breaking Your Heart"	2023	3	5	9	—	BVMI: Platinum; IFPI AUT: Platinum	Gartenstadt
"Schimmel in der Villa"	2023	37	—	—	—		Gartenstadt
"Neunzig"	2023	2	8	11	—	BVMI: Gold; IFPI AUT: Gold	Gartenstadt
"Wenn das so bleibt"	2023	2	7	7	—	BVMI: Gold; IFPI AUT: Gold	Gartenstadt
"Loser"	2024	2	12	14	—		Non-album singles
"Miami"	2024	2	21	23	—	BVMI: Gold; IFPI AUT: Gold	Non-album singles
"Morgen"	2025	3	20	30	―		21 Gramm
"GWHF"	2025	24	―	―	—		21 Gramm
"Mann muss"	2025	12	55	—	—		21 Gramm
"Wolken"	2025	10	49	86	—		21 Gramm

==== As featured artist ====
Title	Year	Peak chart positions				Certifications	Album
Title	Year	GER	AUT	SWI	WW	Certifications	Album
"Madonna" (Bausa featuring Apache 207)	2021	1	1	8	195	BVMI: 3× Gold; IFPI AUT: Gold	100 Pro
"Wunder" (Ayliva featuring Apache 207)	2024	1	2	2	111		Non-album single

=== Other charted songs ===
List of other charted songs, with chart positions
Title	Year	Peak chart positions			Certifications	Album
Title	Year	GER	AUT	SWI	Certifications	Album
"2002" (Sido featuring Apache 207)	2019	6	7	5	BVMI: Gold; IFPI AUT: Platinum; IFPI SWI: Gold	Ich & keine Maske
"Sex mit dir"	2019	13	—	—	BVMI: Gold	Platte
"Beef"	2019	34	—	—		Platte
"Keine Fragen"	2019	44	—	—		Platte
"Doch in der Nacht"	2019	7	—	—	BVMI: Platinum; IFPI SWI: Gold	Platte
"Grey Goose"	2019	50	—	—		Platte
"Sie ruft"	2020	1	5	7	BVMI: Gold	Treppenhaus
"28 Liter"	2020	68	—	—		Treppenhaus
"Beifahrersitz"	2020	91	—	—		Treppenhaus
"Auf und ab"	2020	86	—	—		Treppenhaus
"Nie verstehen"	2020	82	—	—		Treppenhaus
"So weit"	2021	75	—	—		2sad2disco
"Weißes Kleid"	2021	68	—	—		2sad2disco
"Lamborghini Doors"	2021	50	—	61		2sad2disco
"An der Uhr gedreht"	2021	98	—	—		2sad2disco
"Der Teufel weint"	2021	41	—	60		2sad2disco
"Was weißt du schon"	2023	4	15	23		Gartenstadt
"Ein letztes Mal"	2023	85	—	—		Gartenstadt
"Coco Chanel"	2023	97	—	—		Gartenstadt

== Awards and nominations ==
=== Results ===
Year	Award	Nomination	Work	Result	Ref.
2019	HipHop.de Awards	Best Line	Kein Problem	Nominated	
2019	HipHop.de Awards	Best Song National	Roller	Nominated	
2019	HipHop.de Awards	Best Newcomer National	Himself	Won	
2019	Bravo Otto Awards	Newcomer	Himself	Gold	
2019	1Live Krone Awards	Best Hip-Hop Act	Himself	Nominated	
2019	Hype Awards	Breakthrough Artist	Himself	Nominated	
2020	MTV Europe Music Awards	Best German Act	Himself	Nominated	
2020	Bravo Otto Awards	Hip-Hop national	Himself	Silver	
2020	1Live Krone Awards	Best Hip-Hop Act	Himself	Nominated	
2020	HipHop.de Awards	Best Album National	Treppenhaus	Nominated	
2020	HipHop.de Awards	Best Song National	Bläulich	Nominated	
2020	HipHop.de Awards	Best Video National	Fame	Nominated	
2020	HipHop.de Awards	Lyricist of the Year	Himself	Nominated	
2020	HipHop.de Awards	Best Line	Fame	Won	
2020	HipHop.de Awards	Best Rap-Solo-Act National	Himself	Nominated	
2021	Bravo Otto Awards	Hip-Hop national	Himself	Gold	
2021	HipHop.de Awards	Best Song National	Madonna (with Bausa)	Nominated	
2021	HipHop.de Awards	Best Video National	Angst	Nominated	
2021	HipHop.de Awards	Best Line	Thunfisch und Weinbrand	Nominated	
2021	HipHop.de Awards	Best Rap-Solo-Act National	Himself	Nominated	
2022	HipHop.de Awards	Best Song National	Fühlst du das auch	Nominated	
2022	HipHop.de Awards	Best Video National	Fühlst du das auch	Nominated	
2022	HipHop.de Awards	Best Live-Act National	Himself	Nominated	
2023	Bravo Otto Awards	Rap/Hip-Hop national	Himself	Pending	
2023	MTV Europe Music Awards	Best German Act	Himself	Nominated	
2023	1LIVE Krone	Best Song	Komet (with Udo Lindenberg)	Pending	
2023	1LIVE Krone	Best Male Artist	Himself	Pending	
2023	1LIVE Krone	Best Live Act	Himself	Pending	
