= Udo Lindenberg =

German musician and composer (born 1946)

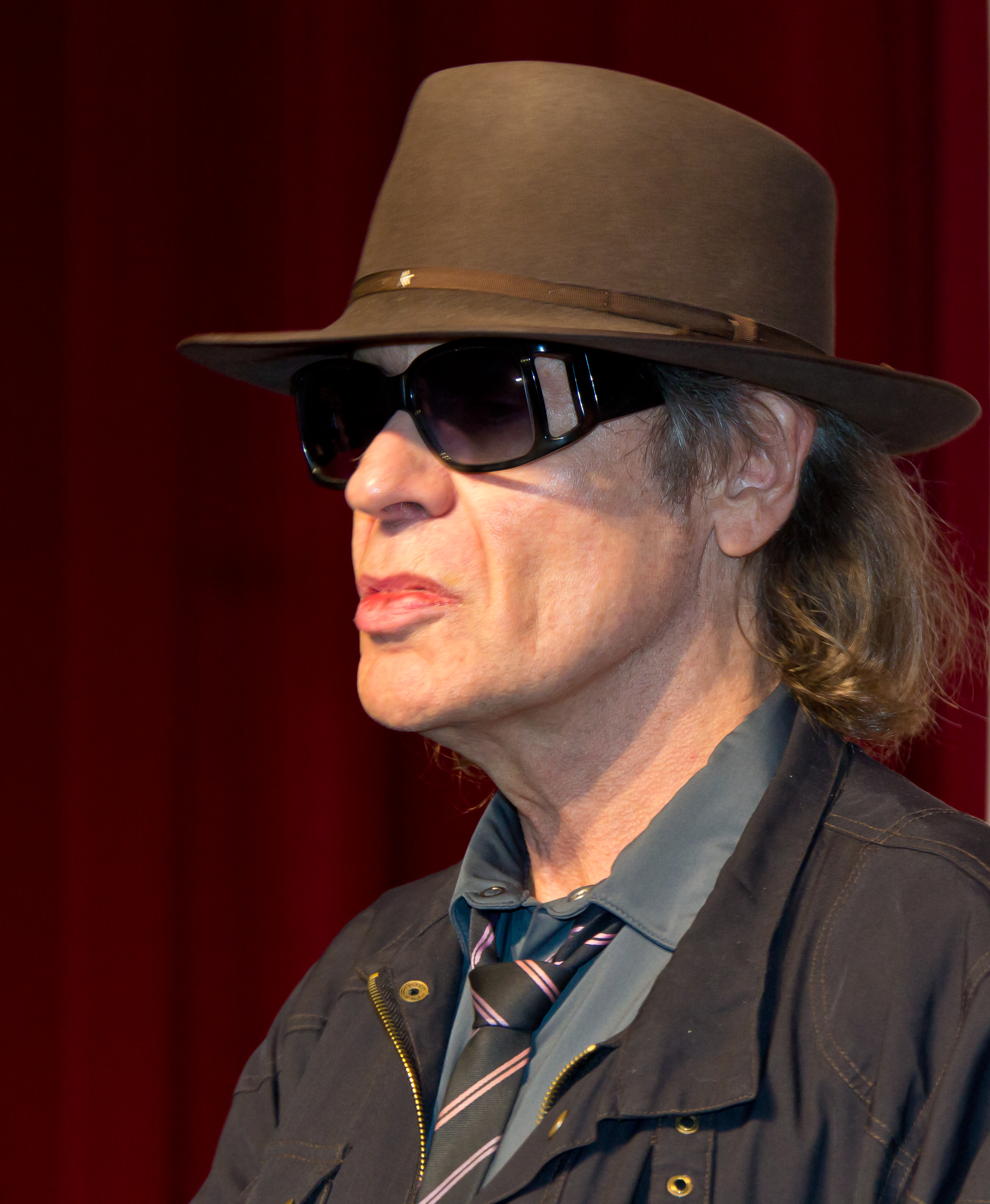
- Lindenberg in 2014

Background information
- Born: Udo Gerhard Lindenberg; 17 May 1946 (age 80); Gronau, Allied-occupied Germany
- Occupations: Singer, musician, composer
- Instruments: Vocals, drums
- Website: udo-lindenberg.de (in German)

Udo Lindenberg (born 17 May 1946) is a German singer, composer, and painter.

== Career ==
Lindenberg started his musical career as a drummer. In 1969, he founded his first band Free Orbit, and also appeared as a studio and guest musician (with Michael Naura, Knut Kiesewetter). In 1970, he collaborated as a drummer with jazz saxophonist Klaus Doldinger in Munich. In 1971 Passport, a band founded by Doldinger, released its first album, with Lindenberg on drums. He also played drums for the theme music for the German TV series Tatort. The first LP by the jazz rock group Emergency was released in 1971, but met with little commercial success.

The LP Lindenberg (also 1971, sung in English, with Steffi Stephan on bass) was likewise unsuccessful. In the following year, the first LP in German was released: Daumen im Wind (produced by Lindenberg and Thomas Kukuck, who also co-produced Lindenberg's next five albums), featuring the single "Hoch im Norden", which became a radio hit in northern Germany. The year 1973 brought a breakthrough with the album Andrea Doria and the singles "Alles klar auf der Andrea Doria" and "Cello". With over 100,000 copies sold, Lindenberg quickly received the largest record deal of any German-language musician up to that time. Lindenberg was earning a special place in the new German-language music of the 1970s, finding a niche between internationally oriented Krautrock and mainstream pop music of the Schlager variety. German-language rock had previously been confined to predominantly political message bands whose music was directed at a narrow audience.

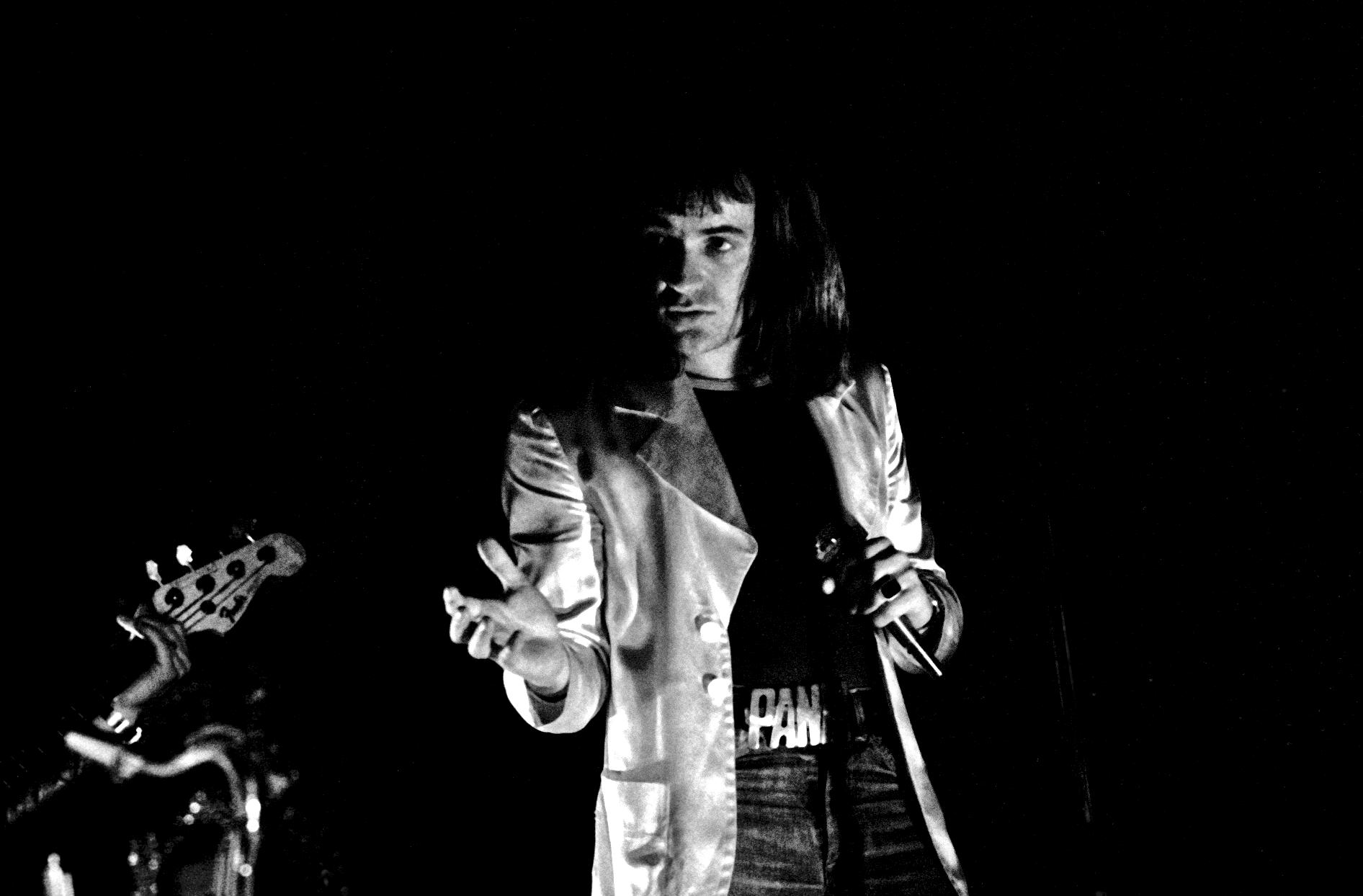
Lindenberg in 1974

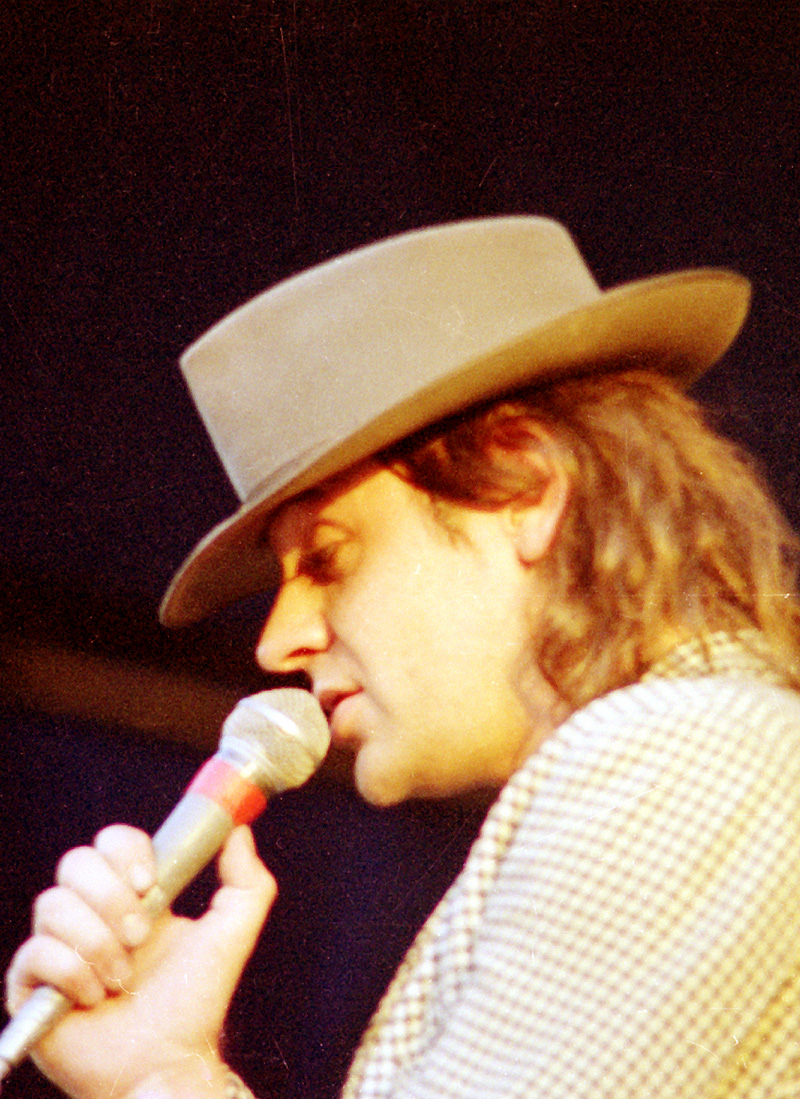
Lindenberg in 1987

Lindenberg's brash style, everyday subject matter ("Bei Onkel Pö…") and his feel for language were an unprecedented combination in German-language music. His pioneering work helped other artists such as Stefan Waggershausen and Marius Müller-Westernhagen get record deals of their own. In 1973, Lindenberg first went on tour with his Panikorchester (Panic Orchestra).

1976 was one of Lindenberg's most productive years. Besides the LP Galaxo Gang, he also released a record under the name Das Waldemar Wunderbar Syndicat (I make you feel good), a first Best of Panik Udo and the first in a series of foreign-language releases, No Panic, on which Lindenberg translated his songs into English. In the same year (and on another LP: Sister King Kong) with the song "Rock 'n' Roll Arena in Jena", Lindenberg first mentioned a Panic Orchestra tour of the GDR. In 1976, Lindenberg discovered Ulla Meinecke and produced her first two albums. She was a guest artist and co-author of the 1977 LP Panische Nächte (Panic Nights) and the 1978 Dröhnland Symphonie. On Lindenbergs Rock Revue (1978), Lindenberg and Horst Königstein "Germanized" rock classics from Little Richard to The Beatles and The Rolling Stones, and went on a big tour. The number 1 hit "We Gotta Get out of This Place" was also released with German lyrics.

The subsequent Dröhnland-Symphonie-Tour was staged by Peter Zadek as a big multimedia stage show with a plethora of costumed extras. The result was Lindenberg's first live album Livehaftig. In 1979, Der Detektiv was the second Rock Revue, in which more international hits such as "Candle in the Wind" by Elton John, "Born to Be Wild" by Steppenwolf, "My Little Town" and "As Time Goes By" (from the film, Casablanca) were "Germanized". Also in 1997 was published "Belcanto - Udo Lindenberg & das Deutsche Filmorchester Babelsberg" which included hits like "Horizont", "Bis ans Ende der Welt" along with a song by Bertold Brecht and Lindenberg's own interpretation of "The Windmills of Your Mind" - "Under the drunkard moon" ("Unterm Säufermond") (lyrics: Lindenberg, Horst Königstein).

One of Lindenberg's most famous songs is "Sonderzug nach Pankow" (Special train service to Pankow), an adaptation of "Chattanooga Choo Choo", released as a single on 2 February 1983. It originated from the refusal of eastern German authorities to allow Lindenberg to perform in the GDR. It was forbidden to play the song in the GDR. On 25 October 1983, Lindenberg was finally allowed to perform for 15 minutes in the Palace of the Republic in East Berlin. In September 1987, he presented a custom Ibanez guitar to the then East German leader, Erich Honecker, during his visit to the West German city of Wuppertal.

On 3 June 2011, Lindenberg performed at Kampnagel unplugged. The recording was later released as an album within the MTV Unplugged series. Lindenberg was the eighth German artist in that series. The album became the second No. 1 album for Lindenberg, awarded platinum status for 200,000 units sold after two weeks. The second single from the album "Cello" (feat. Clueso) went to No. 4, giving Lindenberg the highest chart position in German singles charts ever.

Lindenberg has worked collaboratively with various local and international recording artists such as Eric Burdon, Helen Schneider, David Bowie, Tom Robinson, Keith Forsey, Gianna Nannini, Ellen ten Damme and Nena on a number of projects.

Lindenberg has been living in the Hotel Atlantic in Hamburg since 1995, except for a short break during COVID-19 pandemic in 2020. His somewhat hoarse voice is according to his own statement caused by his consumption of whisky and cigars. In 1989, he survived a heart attack. In 2010, he designed two postage stamps, based on his songs "Andrea Doria" and "Sonderzug nach Pankow", for the Deutsche Post.

For 2014, Lindenberg announced his first stadium tour in Germany.

From 1 February to 2 April 2015, an exhibition entitled "Porsche.Panic.Power" took place in the Porsche Museum in Zuffenhausen and showed numerous items from Lindenberg's private collection. Lindenberg opened the exhibition with a concert in the museum.

Lindenberg features in the 2016 book Panikherz by Benjamin von Stuckrad-Barre. Stuckrad-Barre recounts how Lindenberg helped him move away from a destructive lifestyle.

In February 2023, "Komet", his track with rapper Apache 207, reached number one in the German single charts, which is Lindenberg's first number one single in German charts.

== Discography ==
=== Albums ===
Year	Album	D	A	CH
1971	Lindenberg	—	—	—
1972	Daumen im Wind	—	—	—
1973	Alles klar auf der Andrea Doria^{1}	23	—	—
1974	Ball Pompös^{1}	3	—	—
1975	Votan Wahnwitz^{1}	3	—	—
1976	Galaxo Gang^{1}	4	—	—
1976	Sister King Kong^{1}	8	—	—
1976	Panik Udo^{1}	34	—	—
1977	Panische Nächte^{1}	31	—	—
1978	Lindenbergs Rock-Revue^{1}	15	—	—
1978	Dröhnland-Symphonie^{1}	15	—	—
1979	Livehaftig^{1}	15	—	—
1979	Der Detektiv^{1}	22	—	—
1980	Panische Zeiten^{1}	12	—	—
1980	Meine Panik^{1}	17	—	—
1981	Udopia^{1}	5	—	—
1982	Keule^{1}	9	—	—
1982	Intensivstationen^{1}	16	—	—
1983	Odyssee^{1}	3	8	—
1983	Lindstärke 10^{1}	21	—	—
1984	Götterhämmerung^{1}	3	—	10
1985	Sündenknall^{1}	11	—	22
1985	Radio Eriwahn präsentiert^{1}	17	—	—
1987	Feuerland^{1}	16	—	—
1987	Phönix	26	—	—
1988	Gänsehaut	5	7	—
1988	Hermine	26	—	—
1988	Casa Nova	32	—	—
1989	Bunte Republik Deutschland	—	—	—
1991	Ich will dich haben	—	—	23
1992	Gustav	69	—	—
1992	Unter die Haut	41	—	—
1992	Panik-Panther	24	—	—
1993	Benjamin	49	—	—
1995	Kosmos	44	—	—
1996	Und ewig rauscht die Linde	39	—	—
1997	Belcanto^{2}	29	—	—
1998	Zeitmaschine	49	—	—
2000	Der Exzessor	40	—	—
2001	Ich schwöre – Das volle Programm	80	—	—
2001	Balladen	91	—	—
2002	Atlantic Affairs	76	—	—
2003	Der Panikpräsident	18	—	—
2004	Absolut	65	—	—
2008	Stark wie zwei	1	12	10
2011	MTV unplugged – Live aus dem Hotel Atlantic	1	6	6
2016	Stärker als die Zeit	1	7	2

D: Germany, A: Austria, CH: Switzerland

^{1} Udo Lindenberg & Panikorchester
^{2} Udo Lindenberg & Das Deutsche Filmorchester Babelsberg

=== Singles ===
Year	Single	D	A	CH
1981	"Wozu sind Kriege da?"^{1}	18	—	—
1981	"Berlin"	—	—	—
1983	"Sonderzug nach Pankow"	5	3	—
1987	"Horizont"	18	—	—
1987	"Der Generalsekretär"	60	—	—
1988	"Ich lieb' dich überhaupt nicht mehr"	33	3	—
1989	"Airport (Dich wiederseh'n ...)"	49	—	—
1991	"Ein Herz kann man nicht reparieren"	29	—	—
1991	"Geh nicht weg"	90	—	—
1991	"Club der Millionäre"	39	—	—
1992	"Panik-Panther"	84	—	—
1999	"You Can't Run Away"^{2}	74	—	—
2003	"Wunder geschehen"^{3}	9	—	—
2005	"Hallo Angie, das merkel ich mir"	100	—	—
2008	"Wenn du durchhängst"	10	41	67
2008	"Ganz anders"	28	—	—
2008	"Was hat die Zeit mit uns gemacht?"	52	—	—
2011	"Ein Herz kann man nicht reparieren (unplugged)"^{4}	11	65	—
2011	"Cello"^{5}	4	52	53
2012	"Reeperbahn 2011 (What It's Like) (Unplugged)"^{6}	37	—	—
2012	"Nimm Dir das Leben und lass es nicht mehr los"	45	—	—
2016	"Durch die schweren Zeiten"	26	—	—
2016	"Stärker als die Zeit"	90	—	—
2018	"Wir ziehen in den Frieden (MTV Unplugged)"	77	—	—

D: Germany, A: Austria, CH: Switzerland

^{1}Udo Lindenberg & Pascal
^{2}Freundeskreis feat. Udo Lindenberg
^{3}Nena & Friends (Udo Lindenberg, Sasha, Ben, ...)
^{4}Udo Lindenberg feat. Inga Humpe
^{5}Udo Lindenberg feat. Clueso
^{6}Udo Lindenberg feat. Jan Delay

== Literature ==
- Bundesbeauftragter für die Stasi-Unterlagen: Udo rocks for world peace. The concert 1983 in the Stasi files. Berlin 2013. – free download of the documentation (108 pages) as pdf
- Holger Zürch: Panik pur 2. 40 Jahre Udo Lindenberg. 2007 bis 2011 – eine Bilanz. Selbstpublikation über Engelsdorfer Verlag, Leipzig 2012, ISBN 978-3-86268-729-9.
- Bernd Kauffmann: Sonderzug nach Pankow. Theater der Zeit, Berlin 2011, ISBN 978-3-942449-41-0.
- Thomas Freitag: Udo Lindenberg und der Osten. Neues Leben, Berlin 2011, ISBN 978-3-355-01788-6
- Herbert Schulze, Torsten Wahl: Udo Lindenberg „Wir wollen doch einfach nur zusammen sein“. Eine deutsch-deutsche Rockromanze. Mitteldeutscher Verlag, Halle (Saale) 2011, ISBN 978-3-89812-845-2.
- Holger Zürch: Panik pur. 35 Jahre Udo Lindenberg – Die Bilanz. Mit einem Vorwort von Heinz Rudolf Kunze. Leipzig 2007, ISBN 3-86703-318-8 sowie 2. Auflage als Taschenbuch-Ausgabe, Leipzig 2009, ISBN 3-86901-522-5
- Udo Lindenberg, Herbert Schnierle-Lutz (Hrsg.): Mein Hermann Hesse – Ein Lesebuch. Suhrkamp, Frankfurt am Main 2008, ISBN 978-3-518-46017-7
- Udo Lindenberg: Rock'n'Roll und Rebellion – Ein panisches Panorama. Mit einem Vorwort von Bazon Brock, EVA, Hamburg 2007, ISBN 978-3-434-50613-3 – Erstausgabe mit LP 1981
- Benjamin von Stuckrad-Barre, Moritz von Uslar: Am Trallafiti-Tresen; Das Werk von Udo Lindenberg in seinen Texten. Europäische Verlagsanstalt, Hamburg 2008, ISBN 978-3-434-50617-1.
