= 2018 Echo Awards =

German music award

- Date: 12 April 2018; 20:15 UTC+1
- Location: Messe Berlin, Berlin, Germany
- Presented by: Deutsche Phono-Akademie
- Hosted by: Amiaz Habtu
- Most awards: Ed Sheeran (3)
- Most nominations: Bausa (4); Ed Sheeran (3); Luis Fonsi (3)
- Website: www.echopop.de

Television/radio coverage
- Network: VOX
- Viewership: 1,79 mio.

The 27th and last Echo Awards ceremony, presented by the Bundesverband Musikindustrie (BVMI), honored the best-selling music in Germany. They took place on 12 April 2018 at Messe Berlin beginning on 20:15 UTC+1. During the ceremony, Echo Awards were presented in 22 categories.

== Winners and nominees ==
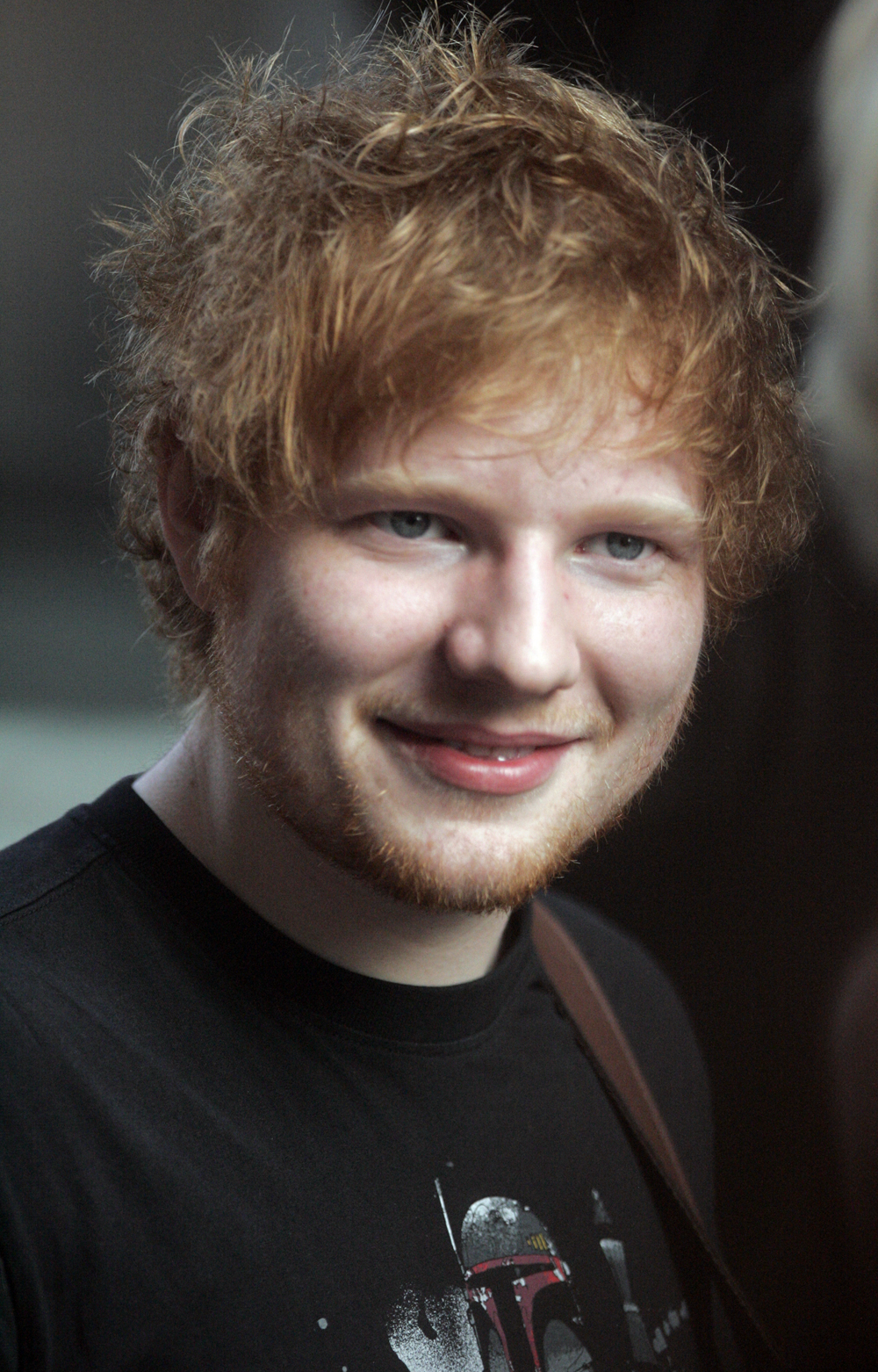
English singer-songwriter Ed Sheeran (pictured in 2013) was nominated for three awards: Album of the Year, Hit of the Year and Artist international and won all of them.

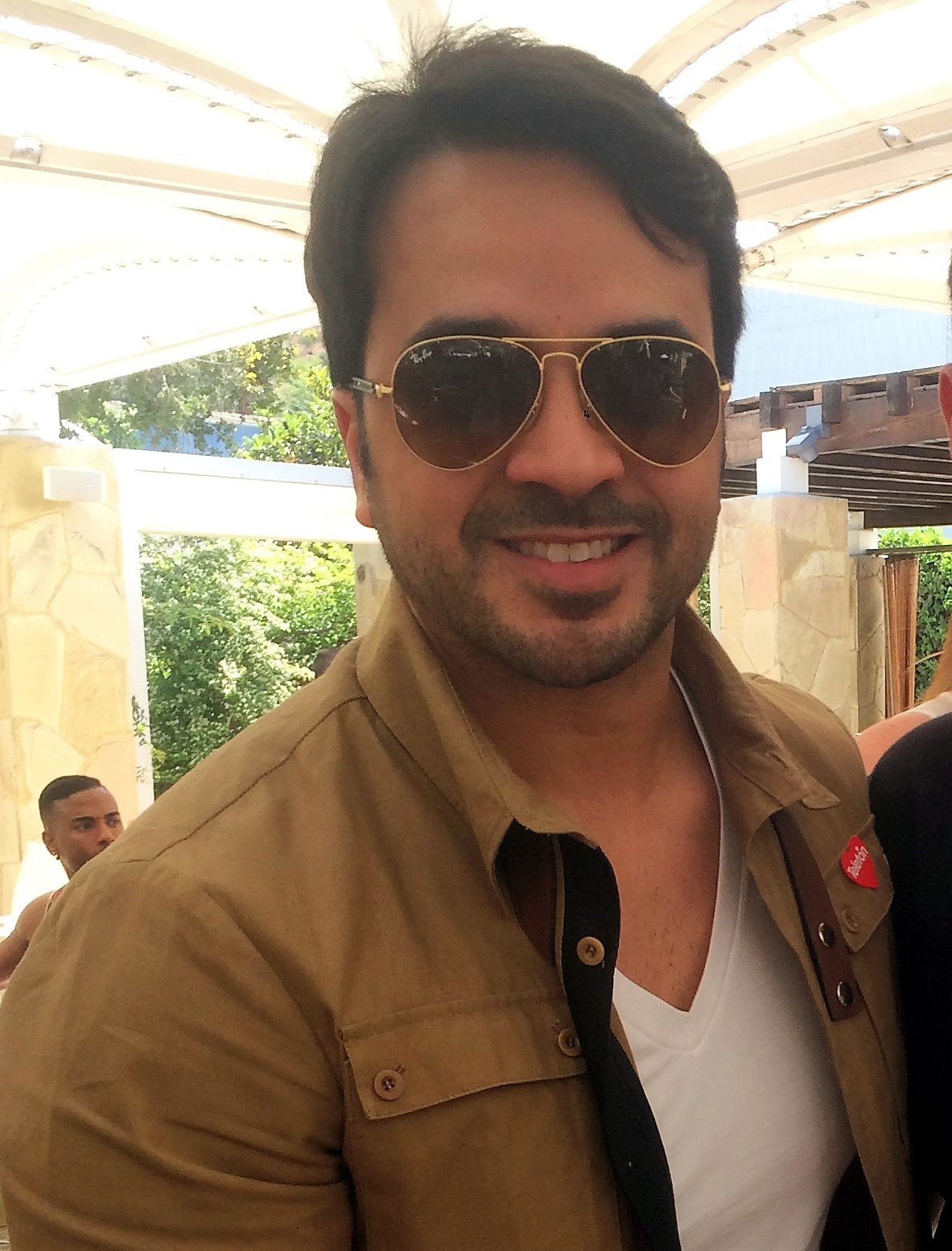
Puerto Rican singer Luis Fonsi was also nominated for three awards and was able to win in the category newcomer international.

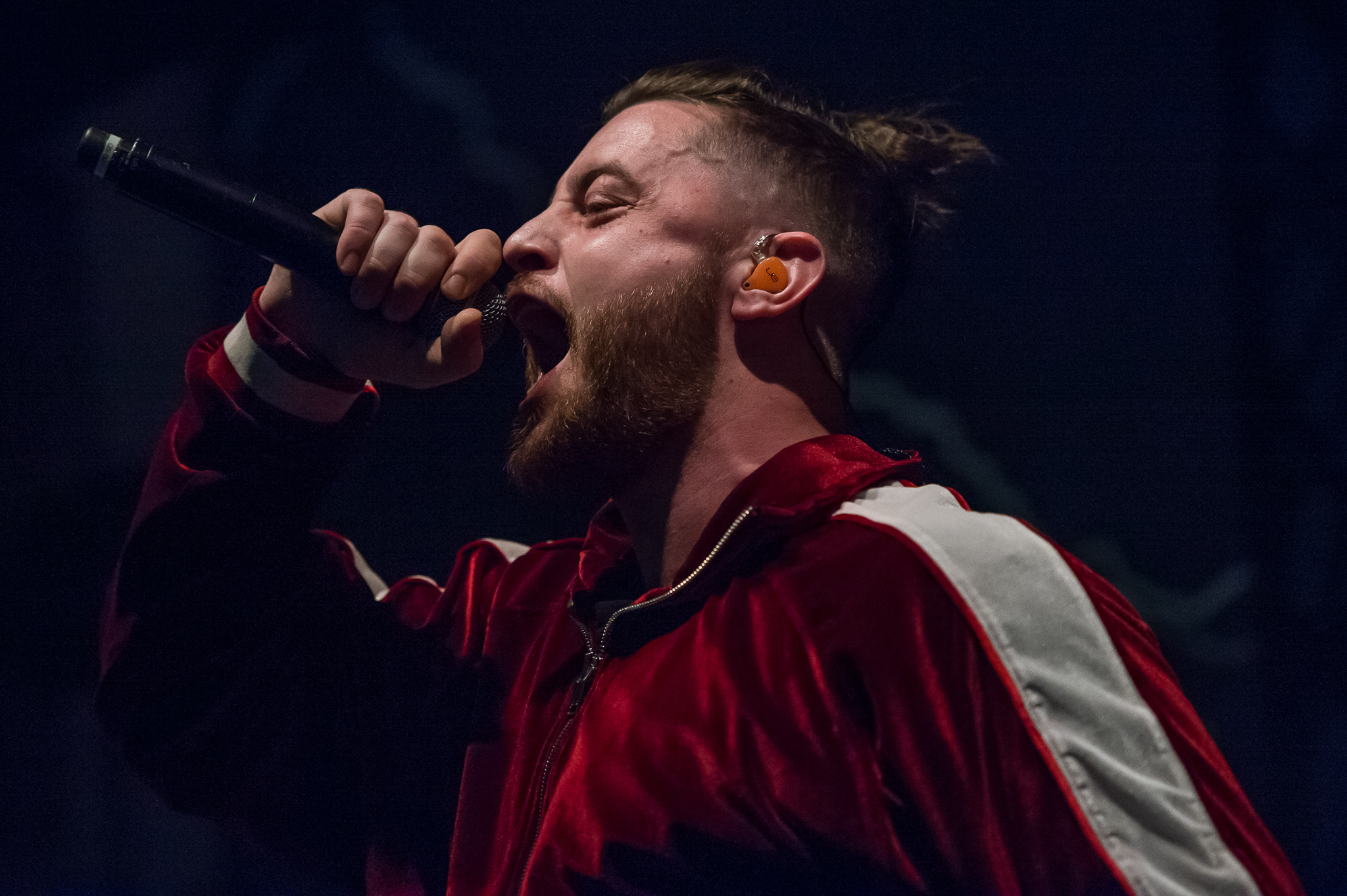
German rapper Bausa (pictured in 2018) was nominated for four awards; two of them for his single "Was du Liebe nennst", one for his first mixtape Powerbausa (2018) and the fourth as newcomer of the year. He was not able to win any of them.

Album of the Year	Hit of the Year
Ed Sheeran – ÷; Helene Fischer – Helene Fischer; Kelly Family – We Got Love; Kollegah & Farid Bang – Jung Brutal Gutaussehend 3; Die Toten Hosen – Laune der Natur	Ed Sheeran – "Shape of You"; Ed Sheeran – "Perfect"; Bausa – "Was du Liebe nennst"; Luis Fonsi feat. Daddy Yankee – "Despacito"; Imagine Dragons – "Thunder"
Artist pop national	Female artist pop national
Mark Forster – TAPE; Peter Maffay – MTV Unplugged; Johannes Oerding – Kreise; Adel Tawil – So schön anders; Wincent Weiss – Irgendwas gegen die Stille	Alice Merton – No Roots; Yvonne Catterfeld – Guten Morgen Freiheit; Julia Engelmann – Poesiealbum; Lina Larissa Strahl – Ego; Kerstin Ott – Herzbewohner
Artist international	Female artist international
Ed Sheeran – ÷; Jason Derulo – If I’m Lucky, Tip Toe und Swalla; Eminem – Revival; Luis Fonsi – Despacito and Despacito & Mis grandes éxitos; Michael Patrick Kelly – ID	P!nk – Beautiful Trauma; Camila Cabello – Camila; Dua Lipa – Dua Lipa; Rita Ora – "Your Song" & "Anywhere"; Taylor Swift – Reputation
Band pop national	Band international
Ed Sheeran – Blossom; Deine Freunde – Keine Märchen; Die Lochis – #Zwilling; Radio Doria – 2 Seiten; Michael Patrick Kelly – MannHeim	Imagine Dragons – Evolve; Depeche Mode – Spirit; The Kelly Family – We Got Love; Linkin Park – One More Light; Sunrise Avenue – Heartbreak Century
Hip-hop/urban national	Rock national
Kollegah & Farid Bang – Jung Brutal Gutaussehend 3; 187 Strassenbande – Sampler 4; Kontra K – Gute Nacht; RAF Camora – Anthrazit; SpongeBOZZ – Started from the Bottom / KrabbenKoke Tape	Die Toten Hosen – Laune der Natur; Beatsteaks – Yours; Eisbrecher – Sturmfahrt; Kraftklub – Keine Nacht für Niemand; SDP – Heartbreak Century
Dance national	Folk Music
Robin Schulz – "Uncovered"; Alle Farben – "Bad Ideas" & "Little Hollywood"; Alex Christensen & The Berlin Orchestra – "Classical 90s Dance"; Gestört aber GeiL – #Zwei; Felix Jaehn – I	Santiago – Im Auge des Sturms; Die Amigos – Zauberland; Kasalla – Mer sin eins; Kastelruther Spatzen – Die Tränen der Dolomiten; Voxxclub – Donnawedda
Schlager	Producer national
Helene Fischer – Helene Fischer; Andrea Berg – 25 Jahre Abenteuer Leben; Fantasy – Bonnie & Clyde; Maite Kelly – Sieben Leben für dich; Ben Zucker – Na und?!	Peter Keller: Peter Maffay – MTV Unplugged; Other nominees: Thorsten Brötzmann, Martin Fliegenschmidt, David Gold, Robin Grubert, Andreas Herbig, Patrick Salmy, Silverjam & Ali Zuckowski: Helene Fischer – Helene Fischer; Julian Otto, Bounce Brothers, The Cratez, Jugglerz & reezy: Bausa – Powerbausa; B-Case, Beatzarre, Djorkaeff, Andreas Herbig, Paul NZA, Yvan Peacemaker, Marek Pompetzki, Patrick Salmy: Adel Tawil – So schön anders; Lex Lugner, Minhtendo, OZ, Alexis Troy: RIN – Eros
Newcomer national	Newcomer International
Wincent Weiss – Irgendwas gegen die Stille; Bausa – Powerbausa; RIN – Eros; Ben Zucker – Na und?!; Zuna – Mele7	Luis Fonsi – Despacito & Mis Grandes Exitos; Camila Cabello – Camila; DJ Khaled – Grateful; French Montana – Jungle Rules; Ofenbach – "Be Mine" and "Katchi"
Best video national	Critics’ Award national
Beatsteaks feat. Deichkind – "L auf der Stirn"; Bausa – "Was du Liebe nennst"; Kat Frankie – "Bad Behaviour"; Fünf Sterne deluxe – "Moin Bumm Tschack"; Marteria feat. Teutilla – "Aliens"	Haiyti – Montenegro Zero; Casper – Lang lebe der Tod; Feine Sahne Fischfilet – Sturm & Dreck; Nils Frahm – All Melody; Tocotronic – Die Unendlichkeit
Lifetime Achievement Award	Partner of the year
Klaus Voormann	Alexander Schulz / Reeperbahn Festival
Commercial partner of the year	Social commitment
Apple Music	Benefiz-Festival Peace by Peace of Fetsum Sebhat; Tedros "Teddy" Twelde
