= List of number-one hits of 2017 (Germany) =

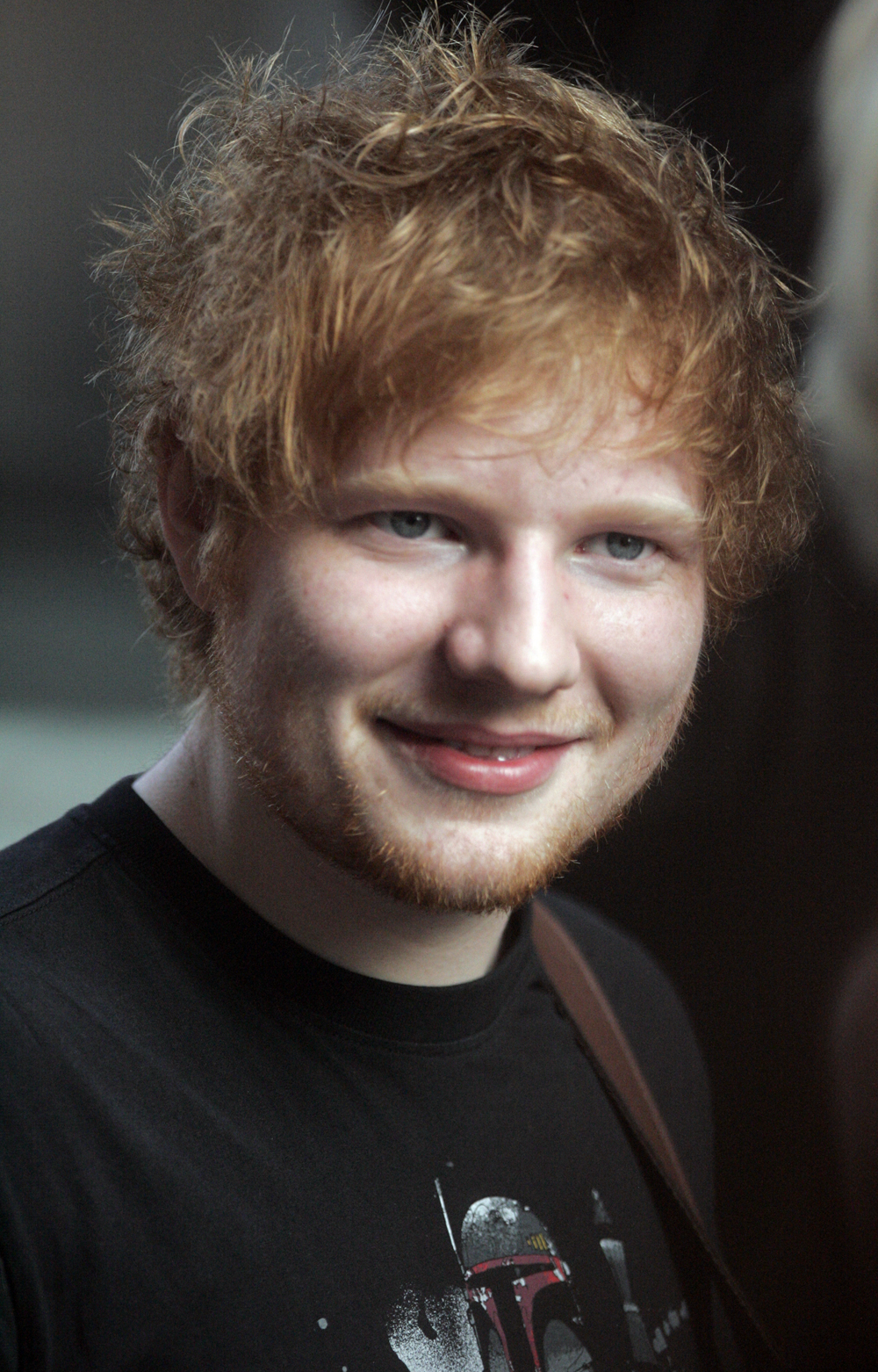
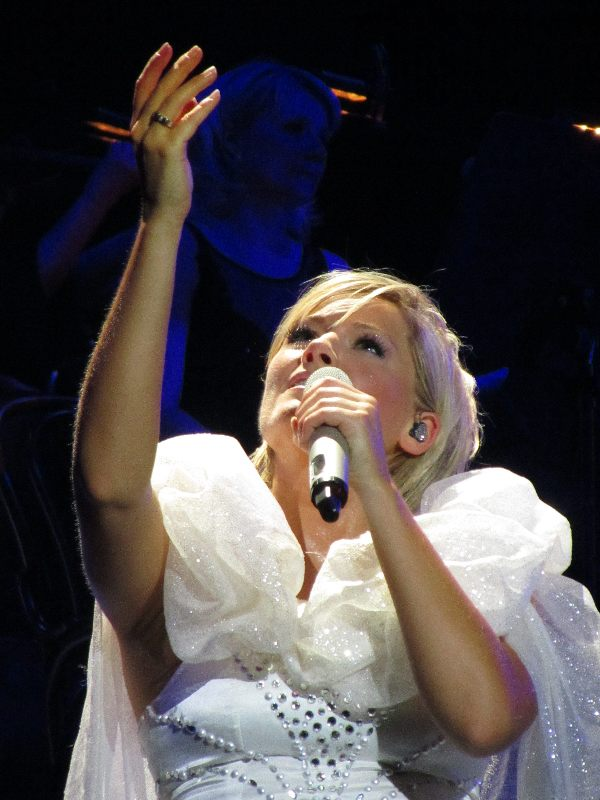
Ed Sheeran's "Shape of You" became the best-performing single of 2017, while Helene Fischer's eponymous album became the best-performing album of the year.

The Official German Charts are record charts compiled by GfK Entertainment GmbH on behalf of Bundesverband Musikindustrie (Federal Association of Phonographic Industry). They include the "Top 100 Single-Charts" and the "Top 100 Album-Charts". The chart week runs from Friday to Thursday with the official chart being published by various third-party media outlets on the following Friday. The charts are based on sales of physical singles and albums from retail outlets as well as permanent music downloads and streaming.

The first number-one-single of the year was "Rockabye" by Clean Bandit featuring Sean Paul & Anne-Marie, which moved into the top spot in the issue dated 30 December 2016 but remained in place for two weeks before being replaced by "Shape of You" by British singer-songwriter Ed Sheeran. "Shape of You" ruled the charts for 15 consecutive weeks, before being dethroned by "Despacito" by Puerto Rican artists Luis Fonsi featuring Daddy Yankee, which led the charts between April and August for a total of 17 weeks. Axwell Λ Ingrosso's "More Than You Know reached number one on issue date 25 August and stayed there for three weeks. German rappers Kay One, Kollegah and Farid Bang reached the number-one position for the first time with "Señorita" and "Sturmmaske auf (Intro)". Bausa's "Was du Liebe nennst" reached the number-one in mid-October and topped the charts for eight weeks. Ed Sheeran ended the year with "Perfect", his second number-one single of the year. The longest unbroken run at number one in 2017 was 17 weeks, which was achieved by Luis Fonsi's "Despacito". "Shape of You" topped the Year End-Single charts.

Albumwise thirty-three different albums reached the pole-position. The Rolling Stones' Blue & Lonesome became the first album number-one of the year, followed by Klubbb3's Jetzt geht’s richtig los!. Ed Sheeran's ÷ became the first album of the year to top the chart for longer than a week in March. Helene Fischer's eponymous album reached the pole-position in May and later topped the year-end album charts. Other albums to top the charts for multiple weeks were Sing meinen Song – Das Tauschkonzert, Vol. 4 by various artists, Sampler 4 by 187 Strassenbande, Zauberland by Die Amigos, 25 Jahre Abenteuer Leben by Andrea Berg and MTV Unplugged by Peter Maffay. Ed Sheeran's ÷ ruled the charts for five weeks.

== Number-one hits by week ==
Key
†	Indicates best-performing single and album of 2017

Issue date	Song	Artist	Refs.	Album	Artist	Refs.
6 January	"Rockabye"	Clean Bandit featuring Sean Paul and Anne-Marie		Blue & Lonesome	The Rolling Stones	
13 January	"Shape of You" †	Ed Sheeran		Jetzt geht’s richtig los!	Klubbb3	
20 January	"Shape of You" †	Ed Sheeran		I See You	The xx	
27 January	"Shape of You" †	Ed Sheeran		Anarchie und Alltag	Antilopen Gang	
3 February	"Shape of You" †	Ed Sheeran		Gods of Violence	Kreator	
10 February	"Shape of You" †	Ed Sheeran		(sic!)	Broilers	
17 February	"Shape of You" †	Ed Sheeran		Auge des Tigers	Majoe	
24 February	"Shape of You" †	Ed Sheeran		Mein Amerika	Philipp Poisel	
3 March	"Shape of You" †	Ed Sheeran		Karma	Mike Singer	
10 March	"Shape of You" †	Ed Sheeran		÷	Ed Sheeran	
17 March	"Shape of You" †	Ed Sheeran		÷	Ed Sheeran	
24 March	"Shape of You" †	Ed Sheeran		Spirit	Depeche Mode	
31 March	"Shape of You" †	Ed Sheeran		We Got Love	The Kelly Family	
7 April	"Shape of You" †	Ed Sheeran		Emotionen	Joel Brandenstein	
14 April	"Shape of You" †	Ed Sheeran		Infinite	Deep Purple	
21 April	"Shape of You" †	Ed Sheeran		÷	Ed Sheeran	
28 April	"Despacito"	Luis Fonsi featuring Daddy Yankee		So schön anders	Adel Tawil	
5 May	"Despacito"	Luis Fonsi featuring Daddy Yankee		Gute Nacht	Kontra K	
12 May	"Despacito"	Luis Fonsi featuring Daddy Yankee		Laune der Natur	Die Toten Hosen	
19 May	"Despacito"	Luis Fonsi featuring Daddy Yankee		Helene Fischer †	Helene Fischer	
26 May	"Despacito"	Luis Fonsi featuring Daddy Yankee		Rammstein: Paris	Rammstein	
2 June	"Despacito"	Luis Fonsi featuring Daddy Yankee		Helene Fischer †	Helene Fischer	
9 June	"Despacito"	Luis Fonsi featuring Daddy Yankee		Keine Nacht für Niemand	Kraftklub	
16 June	"Despacito"	Luis Fonsi featuring Daddy Yankee		Black Friday	Bushido	
23 June	"Despacito"	Luis Fonsi featuring Daddy Yankee		Maximum	KC Rebell and Summer Cem	
30 June	"Despacito"	Luis Fonsi featuring Daddy Yankee		Sing meinen Song – Das Tauschkonzert, Vol. 4	Various artists	
7 July	"Despacito"	Luis Fonsi featuring Daddy Yankee		Epic	Fler and Jalil	
14 July	"Despacito"	Luis Fonsi featuring Daddy Yankee		Sing meinen Song – Das Tauschkonzert, Vol. 4	Various artists	
21 July	"Despacito"	Luis Fonsi featuring Daddy Yankee		Sampler 4	187 Strassenbande	
28 July	"Despacito"	Luis Fonsi featuring Daddy Yankee		Sampler 4	187 Strassenbande	
4 August	"Despacito"	Luis Fonsi featuring Daddy Yankee		Zauberland	Die Amigos	
11 August	"Despacito"	Luis Fonsi featuring Daddy Yankee		Zauberland	Die Amigos	
18 August	"Despacito"	Luis Fonsi featuring Daddy Yankee		Regenbogen	Vanessa Mai	
25 August	"More Than You Know"	Axwell Λ Ingrosso		Sturmfahrt	Eisbrecher	
1 September	"More Than You Know"	Axwell Λ Ingrosso		Anthrazit	RAF Camora	
8 September	"More Than You Know"	Axwell Λ Ingrosso		Lang lebe der Tod	Casper	
15 September	"Señorita"	Kay One featuring Pietro Lombardi		tru.	Cro	
22 September	"Señorita"	Kay One featuring Pietro Lombardi		25 Jahre Abenteuer Leben	Andrea Berg	
29 September	"Señorita"	Kay One featuring Pietro Lombardi		25 Jahre Abenteuer Leben	Andrea Berg	
6 October	"Sturmmaske auf (Intro)"	Kollegah and Farid Bang		Royal Bunker	Savas and Sido	
13 October	"Was du Liebe nennst"	Bausa		Heartbreak Century	Sunrise Avenue	
20 October	"Was du Liebe nennst"	Bausa		Im Auge des Sturms	Santiano	
27 October	"Was du Liebe nennst"	Bausa		TP4L	Trailerpark	
3 November	"Was du Liebe nennst"	Bausa		Im Auge des Sturms	Santiano	
10 November	"Was du Liebe nennst"	Bausa		MTV Unplugged	Peter Maffay	
17 November	"Was du Liebe nennst"	Bausa		MTV Unplugged	Peter Maffay	
24 November	"Was du Liebe nennst"	Bausa		MTV Unplugged	Peter Maffay	
1 December	"Was du Liebe nennst"	Bausa		Sing meinen Song – Das Weihnachtskonzert, Vol. 4	Various artists	
8 December	"Perfect"	Ed Sheeran		Jung, brutal, gutaussehend 3	Kollegah and Farid Bang	
15 December	"Perfect"	Ed Sheeran		Memento – Gegen die Zeit + Live in Berlin	Böhse Onkelz	
22 December	"Perfect"	Ed Sheeran		÷	Ed Sheeran	
29 December	"Perfect"	Ed Sheeran		÷	Ed Sheeran	

== See also ==
- List of number-one hits (Germany)
- List of German airplay number-one songs
