= List of awards and nominations received by Kollegah =

Kollegah awards and nominations
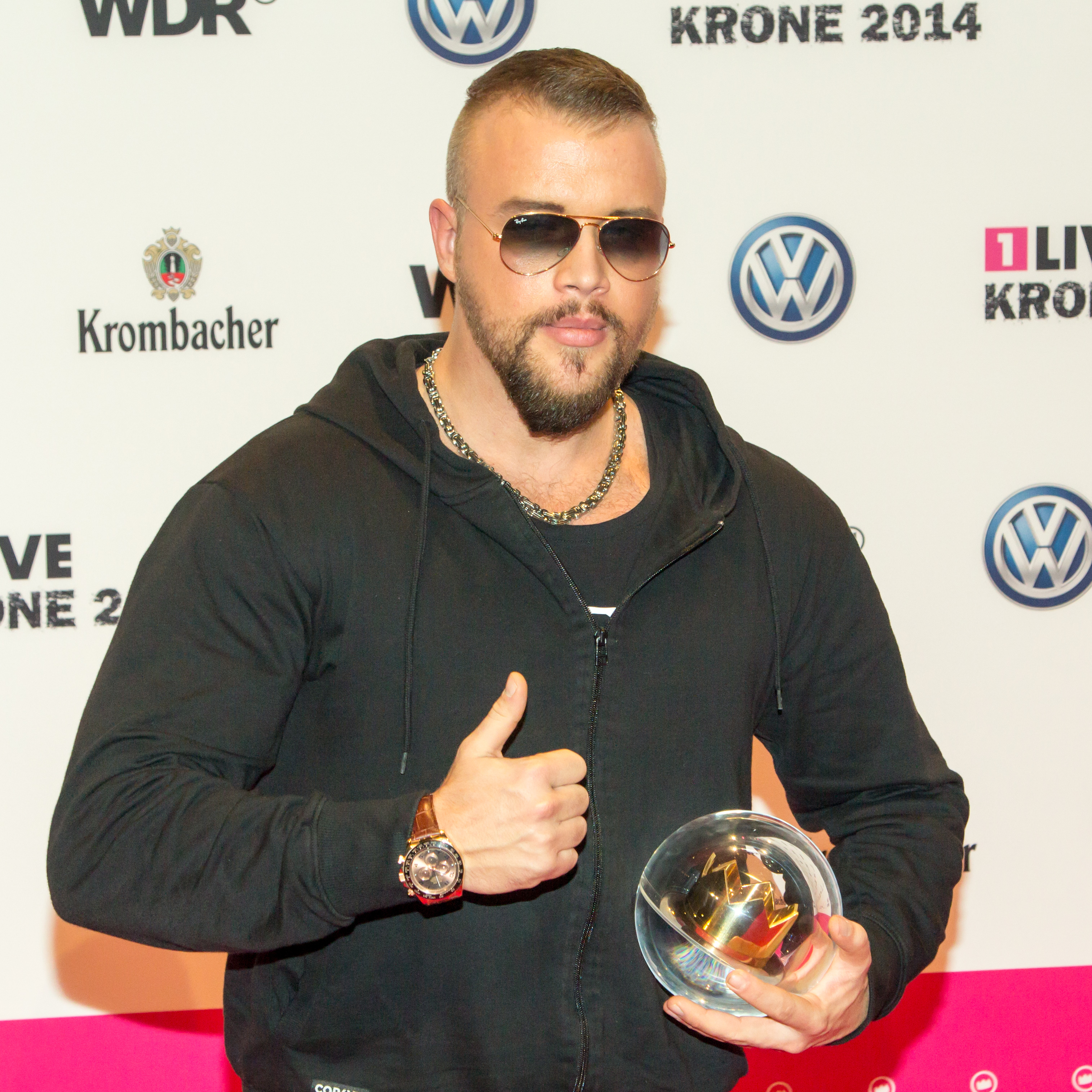
- Kollegah receiving his award for Best Hip-Hop-Act during the 1LIVE Krone in 2014
Awards and nominations
Award	Wins	Nominations
1 Live Krone	1	1
Echo Music Prize	4	7
Webvideopreis Deutschland	3	4
Hiphop.de Awards	10	30
Juice Awards	2	3

Totals (Note: Certain award groups do not simply award one winner. They acknowledge several different recipients, have runners-up, and have third place. Since this is a specific recognition and is different from losing an award, runner-up mentions are considered wins in this award tally. For simplification and to avoid errors, each award in this list has been presumed to have had a prior nomination.)
- Wins: 20
- Nominations: 44

The German rapper Kollegah has received multiple awards and award nominations since rising to prominence in the 2010s.

== Awards and nominations ==
Award	Year	Category	Nominee/work	Result	Ref(s)
1 Live Krone	2014	Best Hip-Hop-Act	"Du bist Boss"	Won	
Echo Music Prize	2015	Best Interactive Act national	Kollegah	Won	
Echo Music Prize	2015	Hip-Hop/Urban	Kollegah	Won	
Echo Music Prize	2016	Best Interactive Act national	Kollegah	Won	
Echo Music Prize	2016	Hip-Hop/Urban	Kollegah	Won	
Echo Music Prize	2017	Hip-Hop/Urban	Kollegah	Nominated	
Echo Music Prize	2018	Hip-Hop/Urban	Jung Brutal Gutaussehend 3	Won	
Echo Music Prize	2018	Album of the year	Jung Brutal Gutaussehend 3	Nominated	
Hiphop.de Awards	2009	Beste Punchline	"Fanpost"	Won	
Hiphop.de Awards	2009	Best collaboration	Jung, brutal, gutaussehend	Won	
Hiphop.de Awards	2009	Best mixtape national	Zuhältertape Volume 3	Won	
Hiphop.de Awards	2010	Best mixtape national	Hoodtape Volume 1	Won	
Hiphop.de Awards	2010	Best collaboration	"60 Terrorbars Infinity"	Nominated	
Hiphop.de Awards	2010	Best single national	"Discospeed"	Nominated	
Hiphop.de Awards	2010	Beste Punchline	"Katapult"	Nominated	
Hiphop.de Awards	2010	Biggest embarrassment	Kollegah	Nominated	
Hiphop.de Awards	2010	Best rap solo act national	Kollegah	Nominated	
Hiphop.de Awards	2011	Best collaboration	"Kobrakopf"	Won	
Hiphop.de Awards	2011	Best social-networks-account	Kollegah	Nominated	
Hiphop.de Awards	2011	Best album national	Bossaura	Nominated	
Hiphop.de Awards	2011	Best Live act	Kollegah & Favorite	Nominated	
Hiphop.de Awards	2011	Beste Punchline	"Business Paris"	Won	
Hiphop.de Awards	2011	Biggest embarrassment	Kollegah	Nominated	
Hiphop.de Awards	2011	Best rap solo act national	Kollegah	Nominated	
Hiphop.de Awards	2012	"Dynamit"	Beste Punchline	Nominated	
Hiphop.de Awards	2013	"Dynamit"	Beste Punchline	Won	
Hiphop.de Awards	2013	Beste Gruppe National	Kollegah & Farid Bang	Nominated	
Hiphop.de Awards	2013	Bestes Release National	"Stiernackenkommando"	Nominated	
Hiphop.de Awards	2013	Bester Rap-Solo-Act National	Kollegah	Won	
Hiphop.de Awards	2014	Bestes Release National	King	Nominated	
Hiphop.de Awards	2014	Bestes Video National	"Alpha"	Nominated	
Hiphop.de Awards	2014	Bester Rap-Solo-Act National	Kollegah	Nominated	
Hiphop.de Awards	2015	Bester Song National	"Genozid"	Nominated	
Hiphop.de Awards	2015	Bestes Release National	Zuhältertape Vol. 4	Nominated	
Hiphop.de Awards	2015	Beste Punchline	"Angeberprollrap Infinity Outro"	Nominated	
Hiphop.de Awards	2015	Bester Rap-Solo-Act National	Kollegah	Won	
Hiphop.de Awards	2016	Bestes Video National	"Hardcore"	Nominated	
Hiphop.de Awards	2016	Beste Punchline	"Nero"	Nominated	
Hiphop.de Awards	2017	Bestes Album National	Jung Brutal Gutaussehend 3	Nominated	
Hiphop.de Awards	2017	Beste Gruppe National	Kollegah & Farid Bang	Won	

== Webvideopreis Deutschland ==
Year	Nominee / work	Award	Result	Ref.
2014	"Armageddon"	AAA	Won	
2014	"Armageddon"	Epic	Won	
2014	"Freuet euch, der Boss ist da auf"	Newbie	Won	
2017	Original Song	Kollegah	Nominated	

== Juice Awards ==
Year	Nominee / work	Award	Result	Ref.
2008	Kollegah	Newcomer National	Won	
2009	Zuhältertape Volume 3	Album National	Won	
2009	Kollegah	Künstler National	Nominated	
