= Sa4 =

Sa4 or SA-4 may refer to:

- Sa4 (Luwian hieroglyph), the 4th of 7 hieroglyphs for Sa in Hieroglyphic Luwian
- Sa4 (rapper), German rapper, member of band 187 Strassenbande
- Saturn I SA-4, an Apollo program launch
- 2K11 Krug, a Russian surface-to-air missile system
