= Flieger =

Single by Helene Fischer

from the album Helene Fischer
- Released: 16 March 2018
- Length: 4:11
- Label: Polydor; Island
- Songwriters: Kristina Bach; Figge Boström
- Producers: Helene Fischer (exec.); Andreas Herbig; Patrick Salmy; Ricardo Munoz (co.)

Helene Fischer singles chronology
"Achterbahn" (2017)	"Flieger" (2018)

"Flieger" (English: "Aircraft") is a song by German singer Helene Fischer. It was written by German singer-songwriter Kristina Bach and Swedish musician Figge Boström for her self-titled eighth studio album (2017), with production overseen by Andreas Herbig and Patrick Salmy along with co-producer Ricardo Munoz. An uplifting dance pop with heavy schlager elements, the song is built around a synthesizer instrumentation and piano riffs. Lyrically, it has its narrator comparing her feelings towards her lover with an aircraft flight.

The song was released as the fourth single from Helene Fischer on 16 March 2018 and became the album's highest-charting single in Switzerland, where it peaked at number 12 on the Swiss Singles Chart. In Germany, the song reached number 19 on the German Singles Chart, becoming Fischer's fifth top 20 entry. German DJ Jay Frog was consulted to produce additional remixes of the song, which appeared on a digital extended play.

== Track listings ==
Digital single
No.	Title	Length
1.	"Flieger" (Album Version)	4:11

Remix EP (Flieger - The Mixes)
No.	Title	Length
1.	"Flieger" (Extended Mix)	4:27
2.	"Flieger" (Rockstroh Radio Remix)	3:52
3.	"Flieger" (Jay Frog Bigroom Remix)	5:04
4.	"Flieger" (Disco Dice Remix)	4:37
5.	"Flieger" (Jay Frog Deep House Remix)	6:11
6.	"Flieger" (Jay Frog Remix)	4:41
7.	"Flieger" (Rockstroh Extended Remix)	5:41
8.	"Flieger" (Disco Dice Extended Remix)	5:08

== Charts ==
Chart (2017)	Peak position
Germany (GfK)	19
Switzerland (Schweizer Hitparade)	12
