= Feuerwerk (song) =

Single by Wincent Weiss

from the album Irgendwas gegen die Stille
- Released: 13 January 2017
- Genre: Pop; dance pop
- Length: 3:29
- Label: Vertigo Berlin
- Songwriter(s): Wincent Weiss; Sascha Wernicke; David Jürgens; Martin Fliegenschmidt
- Producer(s): David Jürgens

Wincent Weiss singles chronology
"Musik sein" (2016)	"Feuerwerk" (2017)	"Frische Luft" (2017)

"Feuerwerk" ('Firework') is a song by German recording artist Wincent Weiss. It was written by Weiss, Sascha Wernicke, Martin Fliegenschmidt, and David Jürgens for his debut studio album Irgendwas gegen die Stille (2017), while production was helmed by the latter. The pop song was released as the album's second single on 13 January 2017 and reached the Top 30 in Germany and Switzerland.

== Formats and track listings ==
Digital download
No.	Title	Length
1.	"Feuerwerk"	3:29

Remix single
No.	Title	Length
1.	"Feuerwerk" (Max + Johann Remix)	3:26
2.	"Feuerwerk" (Vimalavong Remix)	3:05
3.	"Feuerwerk" (Latches Remix)	3:28

== Credits and personnel ==
- Kai Blankenberg – mastering
- Peter "Jem" Seifert – mixing
- Wincent Weiss – vocals
- Sascha Wernicke – backing vocals
- David Jürgens – production, instruments

== Charts ==
Chart (2017)	Peak position
Germany (GfK)	26
Switzerland (Schweizer Hitparade)	28

== Certifications ==
Region	Certification	Certified units/sales
Germany (BVMI)	Platinum	400,000^{‡}
^{‡} Sales+streaming figures based on certification alone.
