= Was du Liebe nennst =

Single by Bausa

from the album Powerbausa
- Language: German
- English title: What you call love
- B-side: "Vermisst"
- Released: 29 September 2017
- Recorded: 2017
- Studio: Red Bull Music Studios Berlin
- Genre: Rap; R&B; pop
- Length: 3:23
- Label: Downbeat; Warner Music Germany
- Songwriter(s): Julian Otto
- Producer(s): Julian Otto; Jugglerz; David Kraft; Tim Wilke

Bausa singles chronology
"Danke" (2017)	"Was du Liebe nennst" (2017)	"FML" (2017)

Music video
- "Was du Liebe nennst" on YouTube

"Was du Liebe nennst" (English: "What you call love") is a song recorded by German rapper Bausa for his first mixtape Powerbausa (2018). It was made available for digital download and streaming audio on 29 September 2017, through Downbeat Records and Warner Music Germany, as the records first single. The Track was written by Bausa and produced by him alongside the Jugglerz and The Cratez. "Was du Liebe nennst" is a R&B, pop and rap song, which features lyrics about fake love.

Commercially, the single reached the pole position of the German and Austrian single charts and the top five in Switzerland. It spent numerous weeks atop the charts and became the first German rap track to become diamond certified by the Bundesverband Musikindustrie (BVMI).

An English-language remake of the song was released in 2021 by Spanish producer Hvme and American rappers 24kGoldn and Quavo, titled "Alright".

== Background and composition ==
"Was du Liebe nennst" was written by Bausa, while production was handled by The Cratez, Jugglerz, and Bausa himself. It was released for digital download and streaming audio on 29 September 2017, while the cd was made available on 17 November 2017, as the first single of his first mixtape Powerbausa (2018) by Downbeat Records and Warner Music Germany.

Musically, it is a R&B, rap and pop song. Lyrically, the record refers to Bausa receiving fake love, which he recognizes, because "he needs it."

== Music video ==
An accompanying music video for "Was du Liebe nennst" was uploaded onto Bausa's official YouTube channel on 3 October 2017. Production company 1Take Film was hired for the shooting, of which Adal Giorgis was credited as the director and Fitem Rustemi of Fati.TV as the camera operator.

The video opens with background information about the music video. It states that the budget was €40,000 and with a voice message by Bausa delivering ideas for the video. Warner Music Germany gave them a deadline of five days. The visual opens up with Bausa walking into a jeweler and buying a watch and ring. Other scenes including Bausa renting a car, taking a flight lesson, playing golf and getting a house ban, and performing in a room full of chandeliers. The clip was shot in Berlin, Frankfurt and in Paris.

The visual was generally viewed positively by reviewers. A writer for the Splash! Mag called the video "extremely entertaining". As of February 2019, the music video is the third most watched by a German rapper, with more than 123 million views on YouTube.

== Commercial performance ==
The record debuted on number 51 of the German single charts on the issue date 6 October 2017. The following week the single jumped to the pole position, making it the biggest jump to number one in German singles chart history. "Was du Liebe nennst" was certified gold by the Bundesverband Musikindustrie (BVMI) on 19 November 2017. The single topped the charts for nine non-consecutive weeks and stayed in the top ten for twenty-four weeks. It was dethroned by Ed Sheeran's "Perfect" on 8 December 2017. Following the release of his first mixtape Powerbausa the single again reached the pole position, but only for one week. It broke the record for most weeks at number one for a German-language hip hop track, became the first German-language hip hop track to be certified diamond by the BVMI and the first German song to be streamed over 100 million times on Spotify. "Was du Liebe nennst" reached the top ten of the year end single charts in 2017 and the top three in 2018. The single was certified seven times gold in September 2020 and spent 65 weeks in the chart.

In Austria, it achieved similar success debuting at no. 18 in October and peaking at no. one for ten nonconsecutive weeks between November and January. The single was certified gold in December 2017, platinum in February 2018 and 2-times-platinum in February 2019. It left the chart after 37 weeks in July 2018. In Switzerland, the single debuted on number 61 and reached its peak 4, after eight weeks. It left the charts after 35 weeks and is certified 2-times platinum by IFPI Switzerland.

== Awards and nominations ==
Year	Prize	Recipient	Award	Result	Ref.
2018	Echo Music Prize	"Was du Liebe nennst"	Hit des Jahres	Nominated	
2018	Echo Music Prize	"Was du Liebe nennst"	Bestes Video National	Nominated	

== Track listing ==
- Digital download
1. "Was du Liebe nennst" – 3:23
- CD
1. "Was du Liebe nennst" – 3:23
2. "Vermisst" – 3:30

== Charts ==
=== Weekly charts ===
Chart (2017)	Peak position
Austria (Ö3 Austria Top 40)	1
Germany (GfK)	1
Switzerland (Schweizer Hitparade)	4

=== Year-end charts ===
Chart (2017)	Position
Austria (Ö3 Austria Top 40)	14
Germany (Official German Charts)	8
Chart (2018)	Position
Germany (Official German Charts)	3

=== Decade-end charts ===
Chart (2010–2019)	Position
Germany (Official German Charts)	7

== Certifications ==
Region	Certification	Certified units/sales
Austria (IFPI Austria)	3× Platinum	90,000^{‡}
Germany (BVMI)	4× Platinum	1,600,000^{‡}
Switzerland (IFPI Switzerland)	2× Platinum	40,000^{‡}
^{‡} Sales+streaming figures based on certification alone.

== Release history ==
Territory	Date	Format(s)	Label	Ref.
Worldwide	29 September 2017	download, streaming	Downbeat, Warner	
Germany, Austria, Switzerland	17 November 2017	CD	Downbeat, Warner	
