= Irgendwie anders =

Studio album by Wincent Weiss
- Released: 29 March 2019
- Length: 39:12
- Label: Vertigo Berlin
- Producer: Kevin Zaremba

Wincent Weiss chronology
Irgendwas gegen die Stille (2017)	Irgendwie anders (2019)	Vielleicht irgendwann (2021)

Singles from Irgendwie anders
- 1. "An Wunder" Released: 12 April 2018; 2. "Hier mit dir" Released: 2 November 2018; 3. "Kaum erwarten" Released: 22 March 2019

Irgendwie anders (transl. Somehow different) is the second studio album by German singer Wincent Weiss. It was released by Vertigo Berlin on 29 March 2019 in German-speaking Europe.

== Track listing ==
No.	Title	Writer(s)	Length
1.	"Kaum erwarten"	Wincent Weiss; Konrad Wissmann; Kevin Zaremba; Matthias Kurpiers	3:13
2.	"Hier mit dir"	Weiss; Zaremba; Alex Knolle; Philipp Klemz; Wernicke	3:04
3.	"An Wunder"	Weiss; Zaremb; Joe Walter; Pascal Reinhardt; Wernicke	3:20
4.	"Auf halbem Weg"	Weiss; Walter; Reinhardt; Klemz	2:59
5.	"Zeichen"	Weiss; Michael Kunzi; Wissmann; Zaremba; Kurpiers	3:17
6.	"Irgendwie anders"	Weiss; Zaremba; Walter; Klemz	2:49
7.	"Pläne"	Weiss; Wernicke; Zaremba; Walter; Klemz	2:48
8.	"Was machst du nur mit mir"	Weiss; Zaremba; Walter; Klemz	3:04
9.	"Jemanden vermissen"	Weiss; Sarah Connor; Simon Triebel; Zaremba; Alex Vallon	2:44
10.	"Warum"	Weiss; Wissmann; Zaremba; Kurpiers	3:13
11.	"Endlich leichter"	Weiss; Zaremba; Vincent Stein; Konstantin Scherer; Robin Haefs; Chris Cronauer; Benne	3:17
12.	"1993"	Weiss; Sera Finale; Wissmann; Zaremba; Wernicke	3:12
13.	"Hoffe es geht dir gut"	Weiss; Zaremba; Walter; Klemz	2:56

== Charts ==
=== Weekly charts ===
Chart (2019)	Peak position
Austrian Albums (Ö3 Austria)	8
German Albums (Offizielle Top 100)	2
Swiss Albums (Schweizer Hitparade)	2

=== Year-end charts ===
Chart (2019)	Position
German Albums (Offizielle Top 100)	22

== Certifications ==
Region	Certification	Certified units/sales
Germany (BVMI)	Gold	100,000^{‡}
^{‡} Sales+streaming figures based on certification alone.

== Release history ==
Region	Date	Edition	Format	Label
Austria	29 March 2019	Standard	Digital download; CD	Vertigo Berlin
Germany	29 March 2019	Standard	Digital download; CD	Vertigo Berlin
Switzerland	29 March 2019	Standard	Digital download; CD	Vertigo Berlin
