= Herzbeben =

Single by Helene Fischer

from the album Helene Fischer
- Released: 12 May 2017
- Genre: Europop
- Length: 3:25
- Label: Polydor; Island
- Songwriters: Thorsten Brötzmann; Alexander Rethwisch; Stephanie Stumph
- Producers: Helene Fischer (exec.); Thorsten Brötzmann

Helene Fischer singles chronology
| "Marathon" (2014) | "Herzbeben" (2017) | "Nur mit dir" (2017) |

"Herzbeben" (English: "Heartquake") is a song by German singer Helene Fischer. It was written by Thorsten Brötzmann, Alexander Rethwisch, and Stephanie Stumph and produced by the former for her self-titled eighth studio album (2017). The song was released as the album's lead single along with "Nur mit dir" on 12 May 2017, while an extended play featuring twelve additional remixes was released on 30 June 2017. Fischer's highest-charting song since 2013's "Atemlos durch die Nacht", "Herzbeben" peaked at number six on the German Singles Chart and was eventually certified platinum by the Bundesverband Musikindustrie (BVMI).

== Track listings ==
- iTunes EP – The Mixes
1. "Herzbeben" (Extended Mix) – 4:38
2. "Herzbeben" (Afrojack Remix) – 4:45
3. "Herzbeben" (Arash Extensive Remix) – 3:13
4. "Herzbeben" (Scotty Remix) – 4:25
5. "Herzbeben" (Anstandslos & Durchgeknallt Remix) 2:33
6. "Herzbeben" (Swanky Tunes & Going Deeper Remix) 3:45
7. "Herzbeben" (Vitalize Remix) 3:20
8. "Herzbeben" (Rico Bernasconi Remix) – 3:40
9. "Herzbeben" (Album Version) – 3:24
10. "Herzbeben" (Afrojack Remix Edit) – 3:42
11. "Herzbeben" (Scotty Remix Edit) – 3:25
12. "Herzbeben" (Anstandslos & Durchgeknallt Extended Remix) – 3:32
13. "Herzbeben" (Rico Bernasconi Extended Remix) – 5:29

== Charts ==
=== Weekly charts ===
| Chart (2017) | Peak position |
|---|---|
| Austria (Ö3 Austria Top 40) | 23 |
| Germany (GfK) | 6 |
| Switzerland (Schweizer Hitparade) | 16 |

=== Year-end charts ===
| Chart (2017) | Position |
|---|---|
| Germany (Official German Charts) | 60 |

== Certifications ==
| Region | Certification | Certified units/sales |
|---|---|---|
| Austria (IFPI Austria) | 2× Platinum | 60,000^{‡} |
| Germany (BVMI) | Platinum | 400,000^{‡} |
^{‡} Sales+streaming figures based on certification alone.
