= Achterbahn (song) =

Single by Helene Fischer

from the album Helene Fischer
- Released: 20 October 2017
- Genre: Dance-pop
- Length: 3:39
- Label: Polydor; Island
- Songwriters: Vincent Stein; Konstantin Scherer; Nico Santos; Wim Treuner; Robin Haefs
- Producers: Madizin; Silverjam

Helene Fischer singles chronology
"Nur mit dir" (2017)	"Achterbahn" (2017)	"Flieger" (2018)

"Achterbahn" (English: "Rollercoaster") is a song by German singer Helene Fischer. It was written by Konstantin Scherer, Nico Santos, Vincent Stein, Wim Treuner, and Robin Haefs for her self-titled eighth studio album (2017), while production was helmed by trio Madizin, consisting of Patrick Benzner, Dave Roth, and Serhat Sakin, and Silverjam. Taking Fischer's music work further away from the schlager genre, the uplifting dance pop song is built around a synthesizer instrumentation and features slight Auto-Tune vocal effects. Lyrically, it details its narrator's feelings towards her lover which she compares with a roller coaster ride.

The song was released as the third single from Helene Fischer on 20 October 2017 and became Fischer's third top ten hit on the German Singles Chart, peaking at number ten. It also became her fourth and third top forty entry on the singles charts in Austria and Switzerland, respectively. Dutch DJ Afrojack was consulted to produce additional remixes of the song, which appeared on a digital extended play. The only single from Helene Fischer to be accompanied by a music video, Fischer collaborated with director Kim Willecke on the colorful visuals which were filmed at the Babelsberg Studio in September 2017.

== Track listings ==
- Digital EP – The Mixes
1. "Achterbahn" (Extended Mix) – 4:21
2. "Achterbahn" (Afrojack Mash Up) – 7:04
3. "Achterbahn" (Madizin Remix) – 3:30
4. "Achterbahn" (B-Case Mix) – 3:52
5. "Achterbahn" (Achtabahn Extended Remix) 3:43
6. "Achterbahn" (King & White Extended Club Remix) 4:56
7. "Achterbahn" (Picco Extended Remix) 4:02
8. "Achterbahn" (Team 33 Remix) – 5:38
9. "Achterbahn" (Fosco Dance Extended Remix) 5:35
10. "Achterbahn" (Vicious Dub Remix) 5:12
11. "Achterbahn" (Afrojack Mash Up - Live-Tour-Version) – 7:15

== Charts ==
Chart (2017)	Peak position
Austria (Ö3 Austria Top 40)	37
Germany (GfK)	10
Switzerland (Schweizer Hitparade)	25

== Certifications ==
Region	Certification	Certified units/sales
Austria (IFPI Austria)	Platinum	30,000^{‡}
^{‡} Sales+streaming figures based on certification alone.
