= Nur mit dir =

Single by Helene Fischer

from the album Helene Fischer
- Released: 12 May 2017
- Length: 4:09
- Label: Polydor; Island
- Songwriters: The Baseballs; Tobias Schwall; Robert Wroblewski
- Producers: Thorsten Brötzmann; Roman Lüth

Helene Fischer singles chronology
| "Herzbeben" (2017) | "Nur mit dir" (2017) | "Achterbahn" (2017) |

"Nur mit Dir" (English: "Only with You") is a song by German singer Helene Fischer. It was written by Sebastian Rätzel, Tobias Schwall, and Robert Wroblewski and produced by Thorsten Brötzmann and Roman Lüth for her self-titled eighth studio album (2017). The song was released as the album's lead single along with "Herzbeben" on 12 May 2017, while an extended play featuring seven additional remixes was released on 30 June 2017. "Nur mit dir" charted in Austria and Switzerland and peaked at number 34 on the German Singles Chart, becoming Fischer's sixth top forty entry.

== Track listings ==
- iTunes EP – The Mixes
1. "Nur mit dir" (Extended Mix) – 6:06
2. "Nur mit dir" (Stereoact Radio Remix) – 4:08
3. "Nur mit dir" (Mania Fox Remix) – 4:08
4. "Nur mit dir" (Franz Rapid Extended Mix) – 5:59
5. "Nur mit dir" (Album Version) 4:09
6. "Nur mit dir" (Stereoact Extended Remix) 5:22
7. "Nur mit dir" (Mania Fox Extended Remix) 5:21
8. "Nur mit dir" (Harris & Ford Remix) – 5:04

== Charts ==
| Chart (2017) | Peak position |
|---|---|
| Austria (Ö3 Austria Top 40) | 56 |
| Germany (GfK) | 34 |
| Switzerland (Schweizer Hitparade) | 52 |

== Certifications ==
| Region | Certification | Certified units/sales |
|---|---|---|
| Austria (IFPI Austria) | Gold | 15,000^{‡} |
^{‡} Sales+streaming figures based on certification alone.
