= Sebastian Hämer =

German singer and songwriter

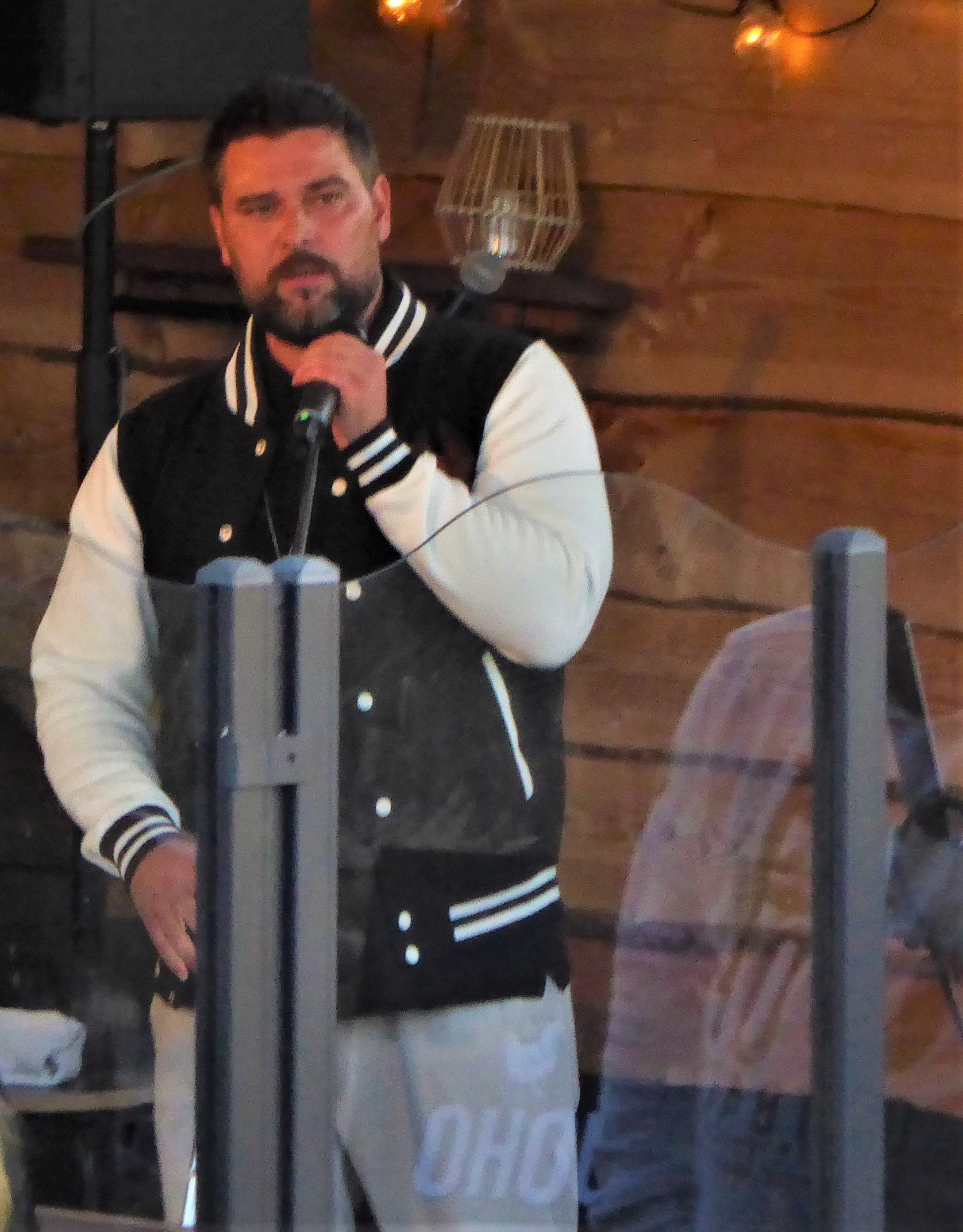

Background information
- Born: Sebastian Hämer; 17 March 1979 (age 46)
- Origin: Prerow, Mecklenburg-Western Pomerania, Germany
- Genres: German Pop, Soul, R&B
- Occupation: Singer-songwriter
- Years active: 2006–present
- Labels: 3p Records
- Website: sommerunsereslebens.de

Sebastian Hämer (born 17 March 1979 in Prerow) is a German singer and songwriter.

== Discography ==
=== Albums ===
| Year | Title | Chart Positions |
| Year | Title | GER Albums |
|---|---|---|
| 2006 | Der Fliegende Mann | 16 |
| 2010 | SH 2010 Flugplan 2 | – |
| 2014 | Schattenmann | – |
| 2017 | Alles auf Start | – |

=== Solo singles ===
| Year | Title | Chart Positions | | Album |
| Year | Title | GER Singles | European Hot 100 Singles | Album |
|---|---|---|---|---|
| 2006 | "Sommer Unseres Lebens" | 9 | 37 | Der Fliegende Mann |
| 2006 | "Nur Mit Dir" | 45 | | Der Fliegende Mann |
| 2007 | "Immer Noch" | 58 | | Der Fliegende Mann |
| 2010 | "Wir glauben an euch" | 100 | | |

Featured in

| Year | Title | Chart Positions | | Album |
| Year | Title | GER Singles | AUT | Album |
|---|---|---|---|---|
| 2015 | "Ich & Du" (Gestört aber GeiL feat. Sebastian Hämer) | 21 | 38 | Gestört aber GeiL |
