= Musik sein =

Single by Wincent Weiss

from the album Irgendwas gegen die Stille
- Released: 11 April 2016
- Genre: Pop; dance pop
- Length: 3:14
- Label: Vertigo Berlin
- Songwriter(s): Wincent Weiss; Sascha Wernicke; Oliver Avalon; Fabian Strangl; David Müller; Kevin Zaremba
- Producer(s): Kevin Zaremba

Wincent Weiss singles chronology
"Regenbogen" (2015)	"Musik sein" (2016)	"Feuerwerk" (2017)

"Musik sein" (transl. Being Music) is a song by German recording artist Wincent Weiss. It was written by Weiss, Sascha Wernicke, Oliver Avalon, Fabian Strangl, David Müller, and Kevin Zaremba and produced by the latter for his debut studio album Irgendwas gegen die Stille (2017). The dance pop song was released as the album's lead single on 11 April 2016 and became a top ten hit in Austria and Switzerland, while reaching the top thirty of the German Singles Chart.

== Formats and track listings ==
Digital single
No.	Title	Length
1.	"Musik sein"	3:14

Enhanced single
No.	Title	Length
1.	"Musik sein" (Vimalavong Remix)	3:20
2.	"Musik sein" (BJRN Remix)	3:22
3.	"Musik sein" (Akustik Version)	3:24

== Credits and personnel ==
- Peter "Jem" Seifert – mixing
- Fabian Strangl – backing vocals
- Wincent Weiss – vocals
- Kevin Zaremba – production

== Charts ==
Chart (2016)	Peak position
Austria (Ö3 Austria Top 40)	8
Germany (GfK)	27
Switzerland (Schweizer Hitparade)	10

== Certifications ==
Region	Certification	Certified units/sales
Germany (BVMI)	Platinum	400,000^{‡}
^{‡} Sales+streaming figures based on certification alone.
