= Helene Fischer (album) =

Studio album by Helene Fischer
- Released: 12 May 2017
- Genre: Schlager; pop
- Label: Polydor; Universal
- Producer: Helene Fischer (exec.); Thorsten Brötzmann; Martin Fly; David Gold; Robin Grubert; Andreas Herbig; Madizin; Patrick Pyke Salmy; Silverjam; Ali Zuckowski

Helene Fischer chronology
| Weihnachten (2015) | Helene Fischer (2017) | Rausch (2021) |

Singles from Helene Fischer
- 1. "Herzbeben" Released: 30 June 2017; 2. "Nur mit dir" Released: 30 June 2017; 3. "Achterbahn" Released: 20 October 2017; 4. "Flieger" Released: 16 March 2018

Helene Fischer is the eighth studio album by German singer Helene Fischer. It was released on 12 May 2017 by Polydor. The album debuted at number-one on the Austrian, German, and Swiss Albums Chart and reached the top ten in the Netherlands and the Flemish region of Belgium. In Germany, Helene Fischer sold more than 300,000 copies in its first week of release, making it the highest-selling debut since Herbert Grönemeyer's 2002 album Mensch.

== Track listing ==
Helene Fischer – Standard edition
| No. | Title | Writer(s) | Producer(s) | Length |
|---|---|---|---|---|
| 1. | "Nur mit dir" | Sebastian Rätzel; Tobias Schwall; Robert Wroblewski | Thorsten Brötzmann | 4:09 |
| 2. | "Sonne auf der Haut" | Kristina Bach; Figge Boström | Madizin; Silverjam | 3:06 |
| 3. | "Wenn Du lachst" | Simon Triebel; Tobias Reitz; Ali Zuckowski; David Gold | Robin Grubert; Martin Fly; Zuckowski; Gold | 3:45 |
| 4. | "Flieger" | Kristina Bach; Boström | Andreas Herbig; Patrick Pyke Salmy | 4:11 |
| 5. | "Herzbeben" | Brötzmann; Alexander Rethwisch; Stephanie Stumph | Brötzmann | 3:25 |
| 6. | "Wir zwei" | Ralf Rudnik | Brötzmann | 3:39 |
| 7. | "Schon lang nicht mehr getanzt" | Jean Frankfurter; Joachim Horn-Bernges | Brötzmann | 3:24 |
| 8. | "Viva la vida" | Oliver Lukas; Sera Finale; Saša Lendero; Mihael Hercog | Madizin; Silverjam | 3:19 |
| 9. | "Achterbahn" | Vincent Stein; Konstantin Scherer; Nico Santos; Wim Treuner; Robin Haefs | Madizin; Silverjam | 3:39 |
| 10. | "Du hast mich stark gemacht" | Christoph Koterzina; Markus Schlichtherle; Daniel Flamm | Brötzmann | 3:09 |
| 11. | "Das volle Programm" | Frankfurter; Reitz | Brötzmann | 3:29 |
| 12. | "Dein Blick" | Hillary Lindsey; Fabian Römer; Cary Barlowe; Henrik Böhl | Brötzmann | 3:18 |
| 13. | "Lieb mich dann" | Römer; Fischer; Beatgees; Henrik Böhl; Wincent Weiss; Sascha Wernicke | Brötzmann | 3:23 |
| 14. | "Wir brechen das Schweigen" | Alexs White; Sarah Hudson; Ferras Alqaisi; Johan Wetterberg; Steve Dresser | Madizin; Silverjam | 3:29 |
| 15. | "Sowieso" | Kristina Bach; Figge Boström | Madizin; Silverjam | 3:51 |
| 16. | "Genau mein Ding" | Frankfurter; Horn-Bernges | Brötzmann | 3:16 |
| 17. | "Weil Liebe nie zerbricht" | Grubert; Justin Stanley; Zuckowski; Finale; Jonas Myrin; Jennie Lena | Grubert; Fly; Zuckowski; Gold | 4:07 |
| 18. | "Adieu" | Fly; Mia Gerta | Grubert; Fly; Zuckowski; Gold | 4:15 |

Helene Fischer – Deluxe edition
| No. | Title | Writer(s) | Producer(s) | Length |
|---|---|---|---|---|
| 1. | "Nur mit dir" | Rätzel; Schwall; Wroblewski | Brötzmann | 4:09 |
| 2. | "Sonne auf der Haut" | Bach; Boström | Madizin; Silverjam | 3:06 |
| 3. | "Wenn Du lachst" | Triebe; Reitz; Zuckowski; Gold | Grubert; Fly; Zuckowski; Gold | 3:45 |
| 4. | "Flieger" | Bach; Boström | Herbig; Pyke Salmy | 4:11 |
| 5. | "Herzbeben" | Brötzmann; Rethwisch; Stumph | Brötzmann | 3:25 |
| 6. | "Wir zwei" | Ralf Rudnik | Brötzmann | 3:39 |
| 7. | "Schon lang nicht mehr getanzt" | Frankfurter; Horn-Bernges | Brötzmann | 3:24 |
| 8. | "Viva la vida" | Lukas; Finale; Lendero; Hercog | Madizin; Silverjam | 3:19 |
| 9. | "Mit dem Wind" | Billy Mann; Römer; Ingrid Michaelson | Herbig; Pyke Salmy | 4:03 |
| 10. | "Wir brechen das Schweigen" | White; Hudson; Alqaisi; Wetterberg; Dresser | Madizin; Silverjam | 3:29 |
| 11. | "Gib mir Deine Hand" | Ludi Boberg | Madizin; Silverjam | 3:07 |
| 12. | "Du hast mich stark gemacht" | Koterzina; Schlichtherle; Flamm | Brötzmann | 3:09 |
| 13. | "Achterbahn" | Stein; Scherer; Santos; Treuner; Haefs | Madizin; Silverjam | 3:39 |
| 14. | "Das volle Programm" | Frankfurter; Reitz | Brötzmann | 3:29 |
| 15. | "Ich wollte mich nie mehr verlieben" | Römer; Steffen Gräf; Henrik Böhl; Ela Steinmetz | Madizin; Silverjam | 3:39 |
| 16. | "Lieb mich dann" | Römer; Fischer; Beatgees; Böhl; Weiss; Wernicke | Brötzmann | 3:23 |
| 17. | "Die schönste Reise" | Peter Plate; Ulf Sommer | Herbig; Pyke Salmy | 3:23 |
| 18. | "Schmetterling" | Alexander J. Benz; Tarek Jarad; Gerta | Grubert; Fly; Zuckowski; Gold | 3:51 |
| 19. | "Dein Blick" | Lindsey; Römer; Barlowe; Böhl | Brötzmann | 3:18 |
| 20. | "Mit jedem Herzschlag" | Römer; Henrik Böhl; Fred Cox; Tanika Bailey | Madizin; Silverjam | 3:38 |
| 21. | "Sowieso" | Bach; Boström | Madizin; Silverjam | 3:51 |
| 22. | "Genau mein Ding" | Frankfurter; Horn-Bernges | Brötzmann | 3:16 |
| 23. | "Weil Liebe nie zerbricht" | Grubert; Stanley; Zuckowski; Finale; Myrin; Lena | Grubert; Fly; Zuckowski; Gold | 4:07 |
| 24. | "Adieu" | Fly; Gerta | Grubert; Fly; Zuckowski; Gold | 4:15 |

== Charts ==
=== Weekly charts ===
| Chart (2017) | Peak position |
|---|---|
| Austrian Albums (Ö3 Austria) | 1 |
| Belgian Albums (Ultratop Flanders) | 5 |
| Belgian Albums (Ultratop Wallonia) | 131 |
| Danish Albums (Hitlisten) | 13 |
| Dutch Albums (Album Top 100) | 6 |
| German Albums (Offizielle Top 100) | 1 |
| Swiss Albums (Schweizer Hitparade) | 1 |

=== Year-end charts ===
| Chart (2017) | Position |
|---|---|
| Austrian Albums (Ö3 Austria) | 1 |
| Belgian Albums (Ultratop Flanders) | 67 |
| German Albums (Offizielle Top 100) | 1 |
| Swiss Albums (Schweizer Hitparade) | 2 |
| Chart (2018) | Position |
| Austrian Albums (Ö3 Austria) | 2 |
| German Albums (Offizielle Top 100) | 1 |
| Swiss Albums (Schweizer Hitparade) | 12 |
| Chart (2019) | Position |
| German Albums (Offizielle Top 100) | 63 |

=== Decade-end charts ===
| Chart (2010–2019) | Position |
|---|---|
| German Albums (Offizielle Top 100) | 7 |

== Certifications ==
| Region | Certification | Certified units/sales |
|---|---|---|
| Austria (IFPI Austria) | 5× Platinum | 75,000^{‡} |
| Germany (BVMI) | 6× Platinum | 1,200,000^{‡} |
^{‡} Sales+streaming figures based on certification alone.
