= Gestört aber GeiL =

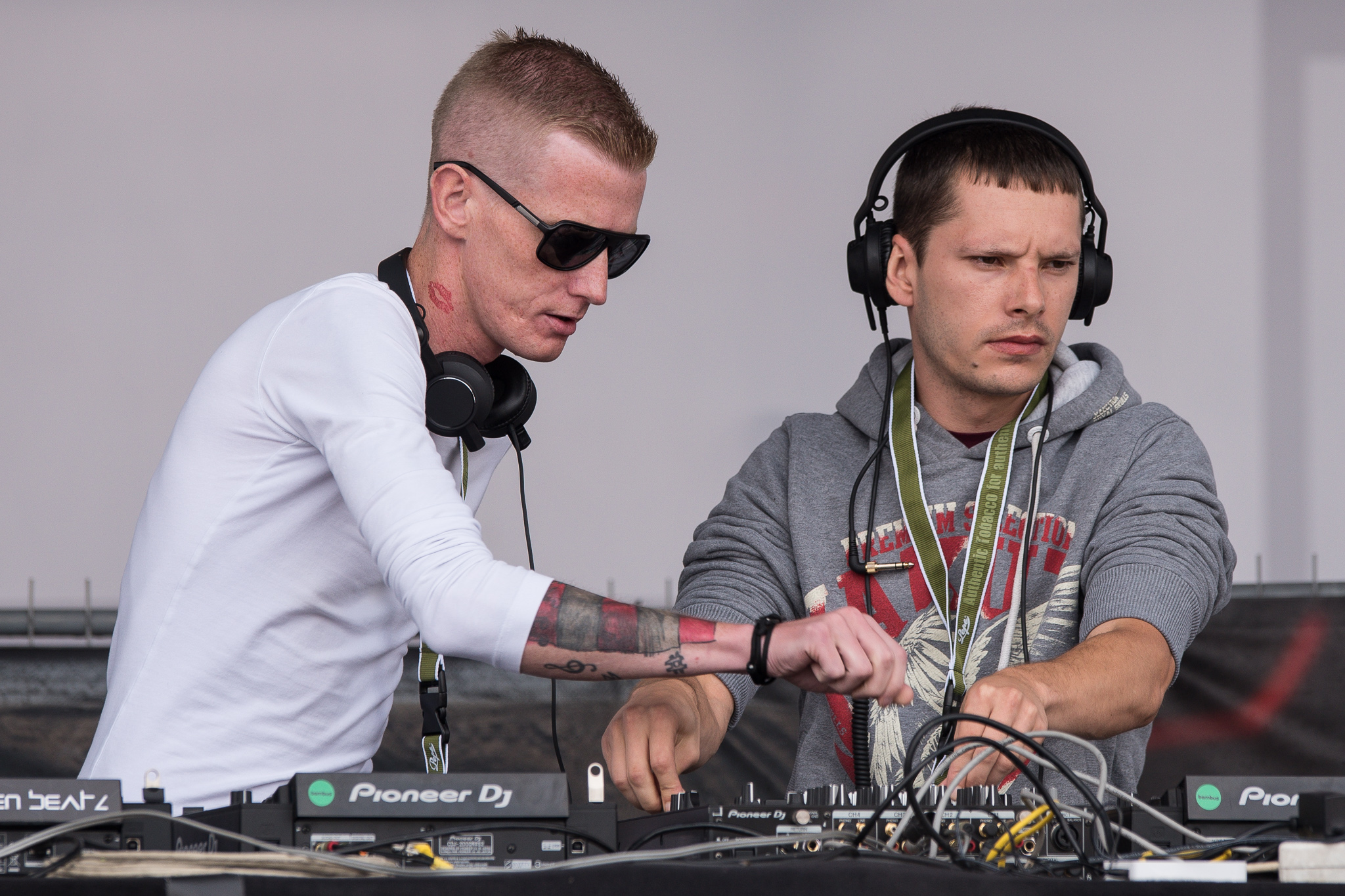

Background information
- Origin: Germany
- Genres: Tech house, deep house
- Years active: 2010-present
- Labels: Kontor Records
- Members: Spike*D; Nico Wendel
- Website: www.gestoert-aber-geil.de

Gestört aber GeiL is a German DJ duo originating from Erfurt in central Germany and made of German producer / DJs Spike*D (real name Marcel Stephan born in Querfurt in 1990) and Nico Wendel (born in Sangerhausen in 1984). The duo is signed to Kontor Records label.

The duo met in the My Ccools World nightclub in Sangerhausen where they DJed regularly and in October 2010 launched their collaborative project Gestört aber GeiL producing a mixture of melodic tech pop and deep house. Their breakthrough came during the Sputnik Springbreak German music festival in 2012 winning the DJ contest main prize.

Since early 2015, the duo is signed to Kontor Records with their first single on the label being "Unter meiner Haut", a remix of the Turkish-German pop singer Elif Demirezer's 2013 song. The new 2015 version by Gestört aber GeiL included collaboration with Koby Funk featuring singer Wincent Weiss. The hugely successful new version reached number 6 on the official German Singles Chart and was certified platinum. The follow-up single "Ich & Du" was also successful this time featuring the vocals of Sebastian Hämer. This single was certified gold in Germany. In 2015, they won Napster Best Band fan award.

On 8 January 2016 they released their debut album, the self-titled Gestört aber GeiL with 19 tracks including both successful singles. The album peaked at number 2 in German Albums Chart, also making the Top 20 in Austria and Switzerland.

== Discography ==
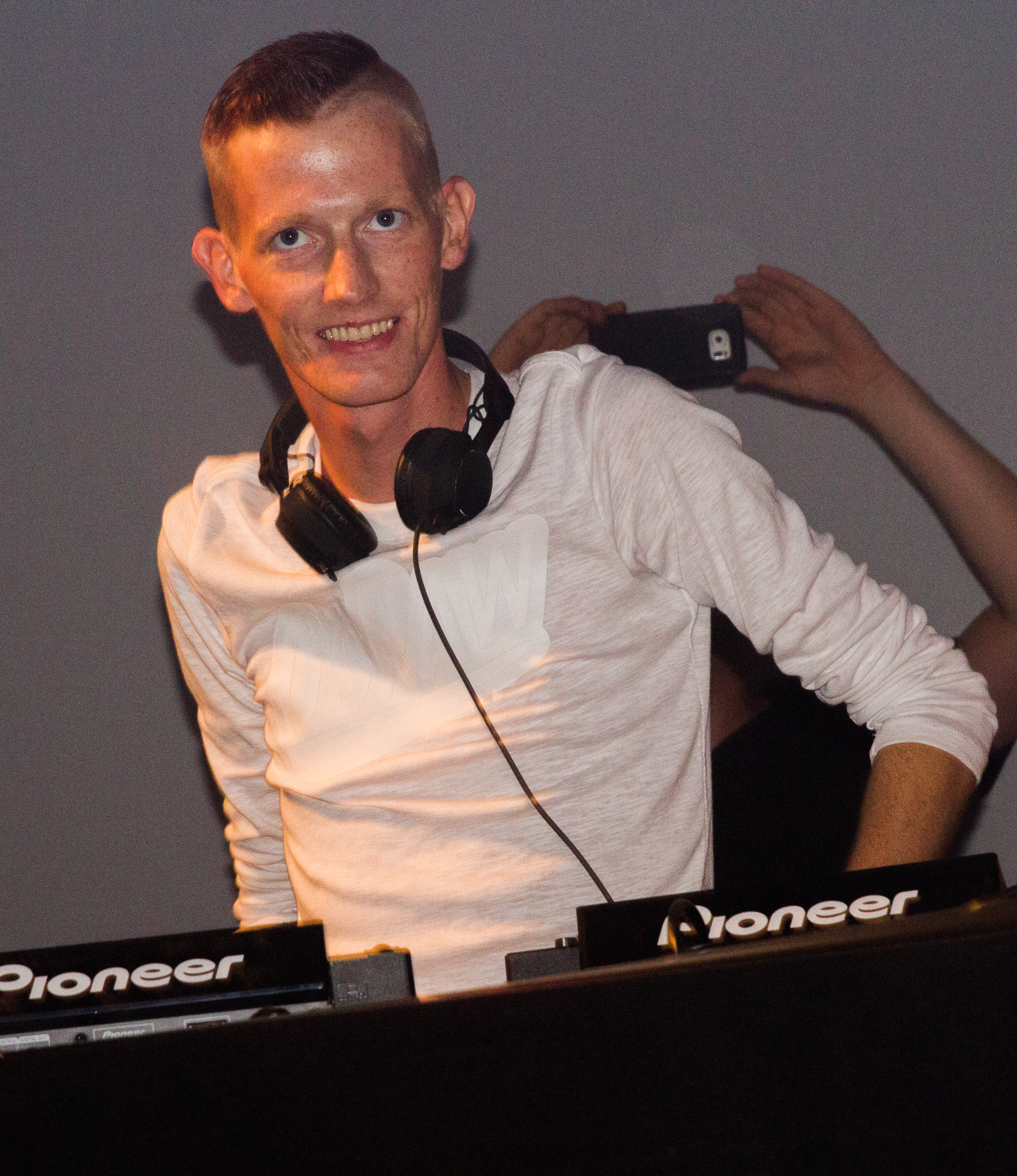
Marcel Stephan (Spike*D) at Airbeat One Festival, 2015

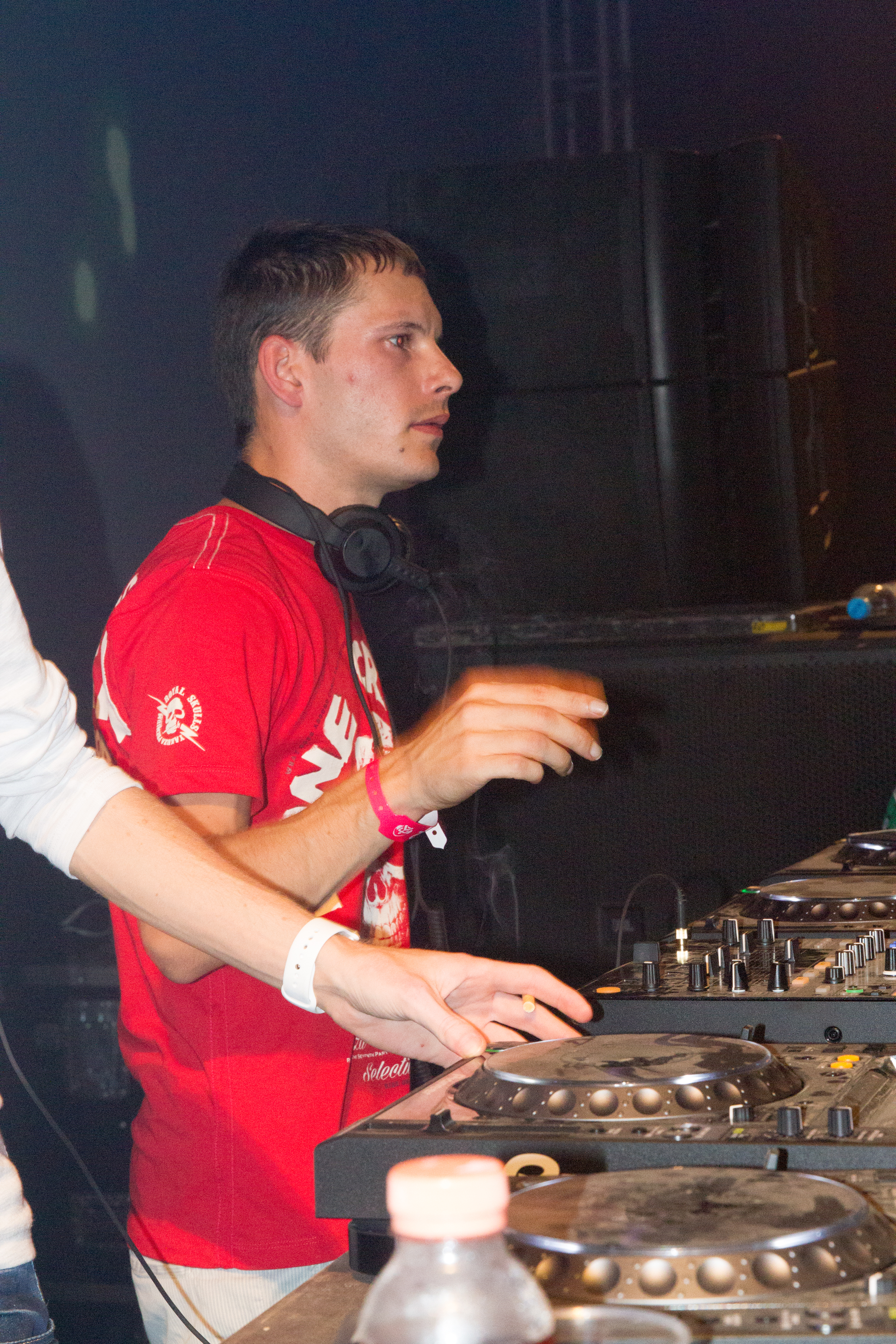
Nico Wendel at Airbeat One Festival, 2015

=== Albums ===
| Title | Album details | Peak positions | | | Certification |
| Title | Album details | GER | AUT | SWI | Certification |
|---|---|---|---|---|---|
| Gestört aber GeiL | Released: 8 January 2016; Label: Kontor; Formats: CD, digital download | 2 | 17 | 11 | BVMI: Gold |
| #ZWEI | Released: 21 July 2017; Label: Kontor; Formats: CD, digital download | 4 | 16 | 44 | |

=== Singles ===
| Title | Year | Peak positions | | | Certification | Album |
| Title | Year | GER | AUT | SWI | Certification | Album |
|---|---|---|---|---|---|---|
| "Unter meiner Haut" (with Koby Funk feat. Wincent Weiss) | 2015 | 6 | 25 | — | BVMI: 3× Gold | Gestört aber GeiL |
| "Ich & du" (feat. Sebastian Hämer) | 2015 | 21 | 38 | — | BVMI: Gold | Gestört aber GeiL |
| "Geh nicht weg" (with Marc Narrow) | 2016 | 96 | — | — | | Gestört aber GeiL |
| "Millionen Farben" (with Voyce) | 2017 | 63 | — | — | | #ZWEI |
| "Wohin willst du" (featuring Lea) | 2017 | 11 | 48 | — | BVMI: Gold | #ZWEI |
| "Vielleicht" (featuring Adel Tawil) | 2019 | 38 | — | — | | Non-album single |

Other releases

- 2013: "Johnny Blue"
- 2013: "Carved in Stone"
- 2013: "Brother"
- 2014: "Heartbeat"
- 2016: "Glücklich wie die Kinder" (with Two Magics)
