= Irgendwas gegen die Stille =

Studio album by Wincent Weiss
- Released: 14 April 2017
- Genre: Pop
- Length: 44:37
- Label: Vertigo Berlin

Wincent Weiss chronology
Irgendwas gegen die Stille (2017)	Irgendwie anders (2019)

Singles from Irgendwas gegen die Stille
- 1. "Musik sein" Released: 11 April 2016; 2. "Feuerwerk" Released: 13 January 2017; 3. "Frische Luft" Released: 11 August 2017

Irgendwas gegen die Stille (transl. Something against the Silence) is the debut studio album by German singer Wincent Weiss. It was released by Vertigo Berlin on 14 April 2017 in German-speaking Europe.

== Track listing ==
No.	Title	Writer(s)	Length
1.	"Musik sein"	Wincent Weiss; Sascha Wernicke; Oliver Avalon; Fabian Strangl; David Müller; Kevin Zaremba	3:14
2.	"Feuerwerk"	Weiss; Wernicke; Jürgens; Martin Fliegenschmidt	3:29
3.	"Ein Jahr"	Weiss; Wernicke; Alexander Knolle; Zaremba; Thomas Porzig	3:32
4.	"Frische Luft"	Weiss; Wernicke; Julian Schwitzler; Jens Schneider	3:18
5.	"Mittendrin"	Weiss; Wernicke; Knolle; Porzig; Jan Platt	3:54
6.	"Nur ein Herzschlag entfernt"	Weiss; Wernicke; Strangl; Zaremba; Sera Finale	3:22
7.	"Herz Los"	Weiss; Wernicke; Zaremba; Stefan Häfelinger; Katrin Schröder	3:45
8.	"Gegenteil von Traurigkeit"	Weiss; Wernicke; Alexander Freund; Zaremba	3:46
9.	"Ich tanze leise"	Weiss; Wernicke; Zaremba; Max Giesinger; Steffen Graef	3:07
10.	"Wenn mir die Worte fehlen"	Johannes Walter-Müller; Finale	3:25
11.	"Wir sind"	Weiss; Zaremba; Wernicke; Julia Kautz; Matthias Kurpiers	3:28
12.	"Betonherz" (featuring Chakuza)	Weiss; Wernicke; Zaremba; Giesinger; Graef	3:39
13.	"Regenbogen" (Acoustic version)	Weiss; Zaremba; Kurpiers; Tamara Olorga; Wernicke	2:38

Irgendwas gegen die Stille – Deluxe edition
No.	Title	Length
14.	"365 Tage"	3:07
15.	"Weck mich nicht auf"	3:36

== Charts ==
=== Weekly charts ===
Chart (2017)	Peak position
Austrian Albums (Ö3 Austria)	14
German Albums (Offizielle Top 100)	3
Swiss Albums (Schweizer Hitparade)	4

=== Year-end charts ===
Chart (2017)	Position
German Albums (Offizielle Top 100)	26

Chart (2018)	Position
German Albums (Offizielle Top 100)	64

== Certifications ==
Certifications for Irgendwas gegen die Stille
Region	Certification	Certified units/sales
Austria (IFPI Austria)	Gold	7,500^{‡}
Germany (BVMI)	3× Gold	300,000^{‡}
Switzerland (IFPI Switzerland)	Platinum	20,000^{‡}
^{‡} Sales+streaming figures based on certification alone.

== Release history ==
Region	Date	Edition	Format	Label
Austria	14 April 2017	Standard	Digital download; CD	Vertigo Berlin
Germany	14 April 2017	Standard	Digital download; CD	Vertigo Berlin
Switzerland	14 April 2017	Standard	Digital download; CD	Vertigo Berlin
Austria	27 October 2017	Deluxe	Digital download; CD	Vertigo Berlin
Germany	27 October 2017	Deluxe	Digital download; CD	Vertigo Berlin
Switzerland	27 October 2017	Deluxe	Digital download; CD	Vertigo Berlin
