= So schön anders =

Studio album by Adel Tawil
- Released: 21 April 2017
- Genre: Pop
- Label: Polydor; Island

Adel Tawil chronology
Lieder Live (2014)	So schön anders (2017)	Live aus der Wuhlheide Berlin (2018)

So schön anders (German: Beautifully Different) is the second studio album by German singer Adel Tawil. It was released on 21 April 2017 by Polydor and Island Records.

== Track listing ==
Disc 1: So schön anders – Standard edition
No.	Title	Length
1.	"So schön anders"	4:07
2.	"Ist da jemand"	3:43
3.	"Ich bin wie ich bin"	3:44
4.	"Eine Welt eine Heimat" (featuring Youssou N'Dour & Mohamed Mounir)	4:00
5.	"Worte"	3:58
6.	"Bis hier und noch weiter" (featuring KC Rebell & Summer Cem)	3:48
7.	"Mein Leben ohne mich"	3:14
8.	"Gott steh mir bei"	4:10
9.	"Endgegner"	3:28
10.	"Nur Liebe mitgebracht"	4:01
11.	"Polarlichter" (featuring MoTrip)	3:52
12.	"Bei dir"	2:57
13.	"Erinnern"	3:42
14.	"Sensation"	3:37

Disc 2: So schön anders – Deluxe edition
No.	Title	Length
1.	"Wahr ist"	4:17
2.	"Tänzer und Soldaten"	2:51
3.	"Die schönsten Tage"	3:06
4.	"Zwischen zwei Lieben"	3:01
5.	"Brüder"	3:05
6.	"Ist da jemand" (Akustik Version)	3:42

== Charts ==
=== Weekly charts ===
Chart (2017)	Peak position
Austrian Albums (Ö3 Austria)	5
German Albums (Offizielle Top 100)	1
Swiss Albums (Schweizer Hitparade)	3

=== Year-end charts ===
Chart (2017)	Position
Austrian Albums (Ö3 Austria)	57
German Albums (Offizielle Top 100)	15
Swiss Albums (Schweizer Hitparade)	29

== Certifications and sales ==
Region	Certification	Certified units/sales
Germany (BVMI)	Gold	100,000^{‡}
^{‡} Sales+streaming figures based on certification alone.
