= Gute Nacht (album) =

Studio album by Kontra K
- Released: 28 April 2017
- Length: 174:05
- Label: BMG

Kontra K chronology
Labyrinth (2016)	Gute Nacht (2017)	Erde & Knochen (2018)

Singles from Gute Nacht
- 1. "Diamanten" Released: 17 February 2017; 2. "Mehr als ein Job" Released: 17 March 2017; 3. "Plem Plem" Released: 7 April 2017; 4. "Gift" Released: 20 April 2017

Gute Nacht is the sixth studio album by German rapper Kontra K. It was released on 28 April 2017 through BMG Rights Management. "Diamanten" was released as the album's lead single on 17 February 2017.

The album debuted at number one in Germany.

== Charts ==
Chart (2017)	Peak position
Austrian Albums (Ö3 Austria)	2
German Albums (Offizielle Top 100)	1
Swiss Albums (Schweizer Hitparade)	7

=== Year-end charts ===
Chart (2017)	Position
German Albums (Offizielle Top 100)	27

== Certifications ==
Region	Certification	Certified units/sales
Germany (BVMI)	Gold	100,000^{‡}
^{‡} Sales+streaming figures based on certification alone.
