= Wincent Weiss =

German pop singer (born 1993)

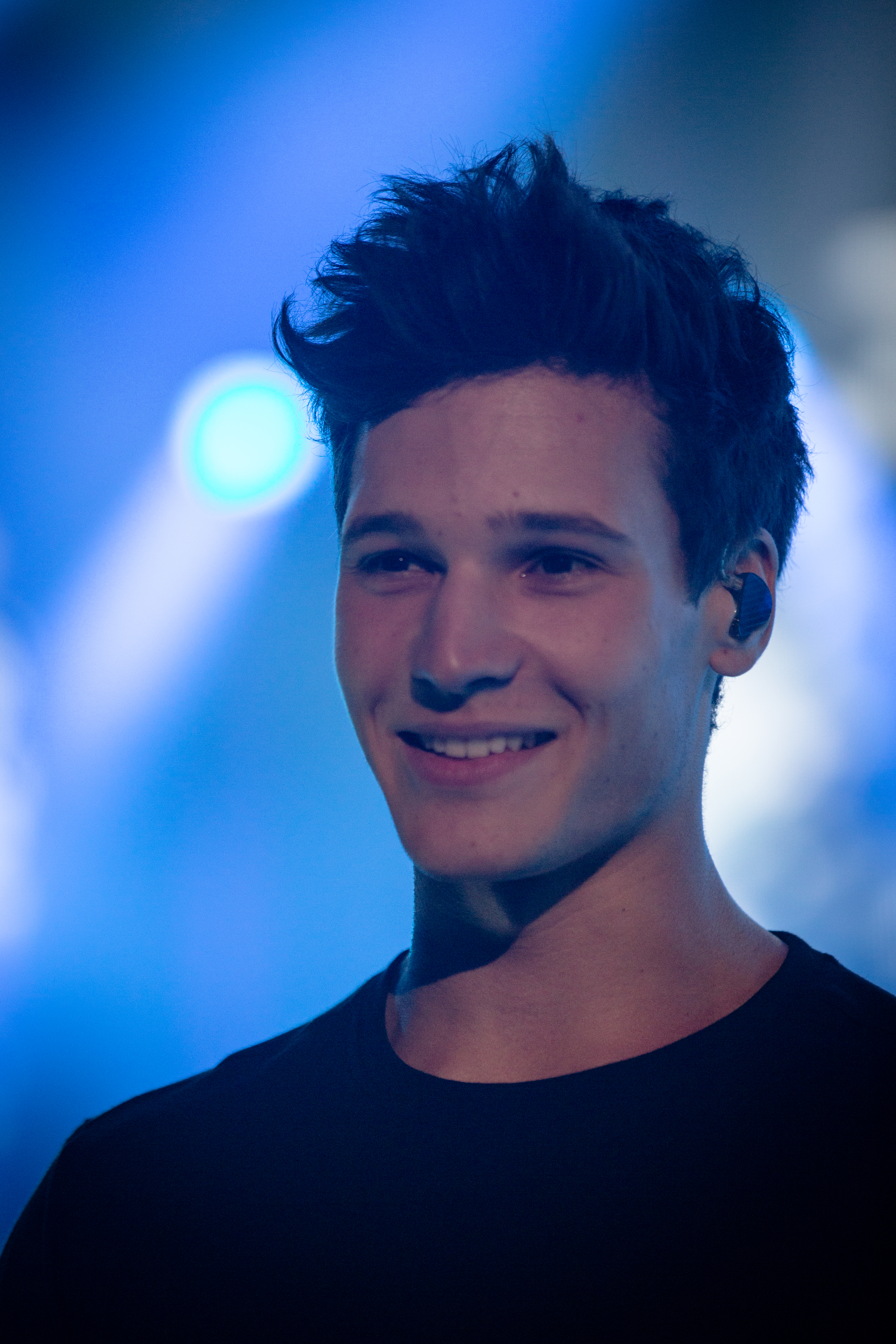
- Weiss in 2017

Background information
- Born: 21 January 1993 (age 33); Bad Oldesloe, Schleswig-Holstein, Germany
- Genres: Pop, acoustic pop, adult contemporary
- Occupation: Singer
- Years active: 2013–present
- Website: wincentweiss.de

Wincent Weiss (German pronunciation: [ˈvɪntsn̩t ˈvaɪs]; born 21 January 1993) is a German singer who originally gained prominence as a contestant in the talent show Deutschland sucht den Superstar in 2013.

== Career ==
=== 2013–2017: Irgendwas gegen die Stille ===
In 2013, Weiss participated in the tenth season of the German talent show Deutschland sucht den Superstar, the German adaptation of the Idol franchise. After a successful audition, he became one of the top 29 contestants but failed to make it to the live shows. In 2015, German DJ duo Gestört aber GeiL and Koby Funk produced a remix of his rendition of "Unter meiner Haut", an acoustic cover of Elif Demirezer's same-titled song which Weiss had previously uploaded on YouTube. The song peaked as number six on the German Singles Chart and earned a platinum certification by the Bundesverband Musikindustrie (BVMI).

Before he received his first record deal, he was a waiter and a model. He has been represented by Tune Models in Cologne. During the fashion week for the spring/summer 2016 season, he walked as an exclusive for Versace menswear.

Weiss's first solo single "Regenbogen" was released the same year but failed to chart. In 2016, he released the single "Musik sein", which was a success in the German-speaking part of Europe, becoming a top ten hit in Austria and Switzerland. Follow-up "Feuerwerk", released in 2017, entered the top thirty in Germany and Switzerland and preceded his first studio album Irgendwas gegen die Stille, released in April 2017. A commercial success, it peaked at number three in Germany and at number four in Switzerland, eventually going platinum in both countries. A reissue of the album was released later that year. In May 2017, Weiss served as a member of Germany's jury at the 62nd Eurovision Song Contest in Kyiv, Ukraine. In November, he was awarded the MTV Europe Music Award for Best German Act.

=== 2018–present: Irgendwie anders ===
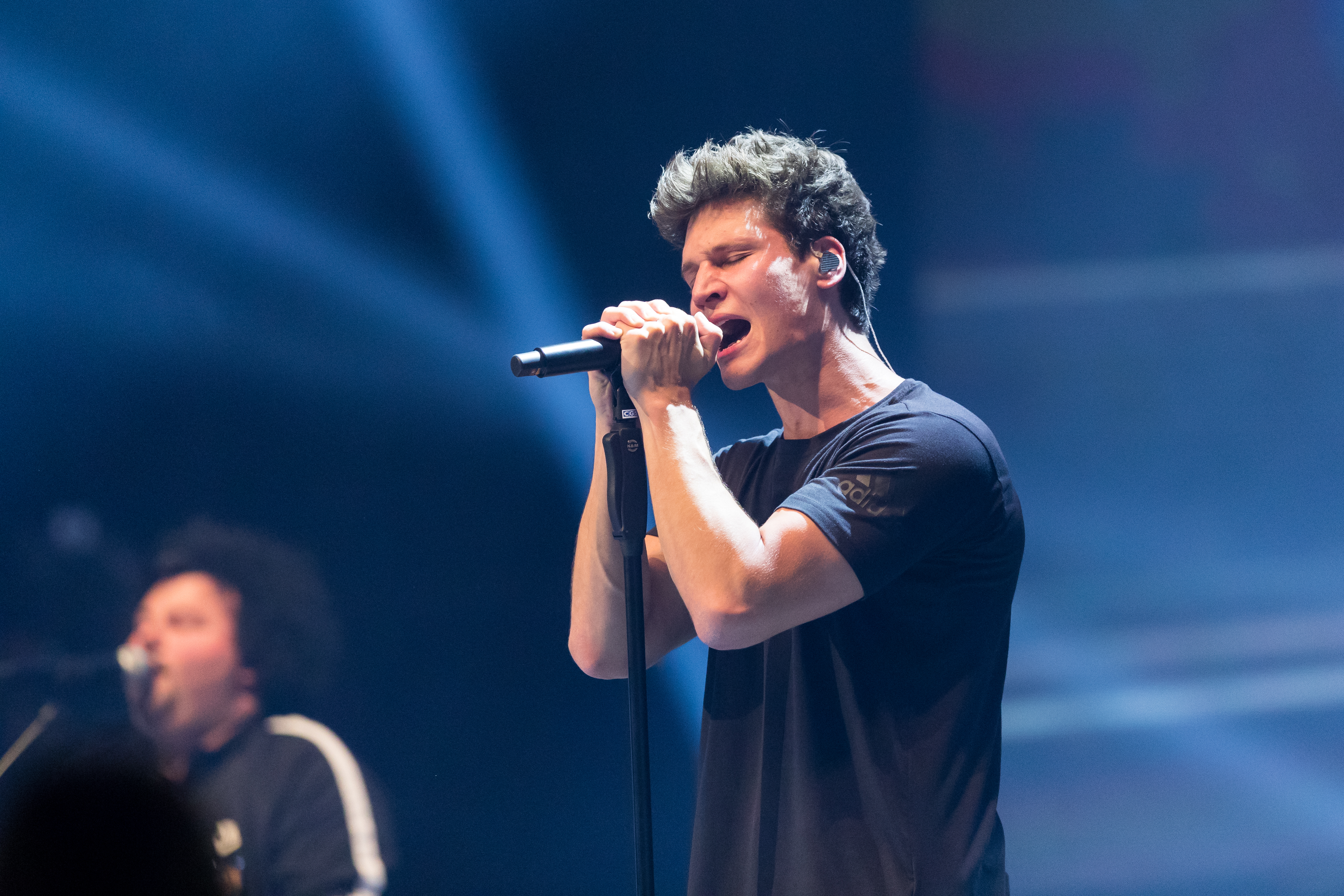
Weiss at 30 Jahre Radio Regenbogen in Mannheim in 2018

In April 2018, Weiss won the Echo Award in the National Newcomer category. He was also nominated for National Pop Artist. The same month, he released his single "An Wunder," the lead single from his second album Irgendwie anders. It reached the top 20 of the German Singles Chart and gained gold status in Germany. Also that year, Weiss voiced the titular character in a German animated fantasy family film Tabaluga, based on the media franchise of the same name created by musician Peter Maffay. Irgendwie anders was released in March 2019 and peaked at number two in Germany and Switzerland. As with "An Wunder," it was certified gold by the BVMI and produced five further singles, including "Hier mit dir." The same year, Weiss participated in the sixth season of the German reality television show Sing meinen Song – Das Tauschkonzert, the German adaptation of The Best Singers franchise. In 2020, Weiss released the previously unreleased single "Sag so," a collaboration with Achtabahn.

From 2021 to 2025, Weiss was featured as a coach on The Voice Kids Germany. In 2024, at the conclusion of his fourth season, Jakob Hebgen, a member of Weiss' team, won the season making Weiss the winning coach. In 2025, Weiss' team was again victorious when his artist Neo Klingl won on Weiss' fifth season as a coach.

== Discography ==
=== Albums ===
| Title | Album details | Peak chart positions | | | Certifications |
| Title | Album details | GER | AUT | SWI | Certifications |
|---|---|---|---|---|---|
| Irgendwas gegen die Stille | Released: 14 April 2017; Label: Vertigo Berlin; Format: CD, digital download | 3 | 14 | 4 | BVMI: 3× Gold; IFPI SWI: Platinum |
| Irgendwie anders | Released: 29 March 2019; Label: Vertigo Berlin; Formats: CD, digital download | 2 | 8 | 2 | BVMI: Gold |
| Vielleicht irgendwann | Released: 7 May 2021; Label: Vertigo Berlin; Formats: CD, box set, digital download | 1 | 1 | 2 | |
| Irgendwo ankommen | Released: 28 April 2023; Label: Vertigo Berlin; Formats: CD, box set, digital download | 2 | 4 | 2 | |
| Wincents weisse Weihnachten | Released: 1 December 2023; Label: Vertigo Berlin; Formats: CD, box set, digital download | 1 | 9 | 14 | |
| Hast du kurz Zeit | Released: 22 January 2026; Label: Vertigo Berlin; Formats: CD, digital download | 1 | 3 | 3 | |

=== Singles ===
| Title | Year | Peak chart positions | | | Certifications | Album |
| Title | Year | GER | AUT | SWI | Certifications | Album |
|---|---|---|---|---|---|---|
| "Regenbogen" (Note: "Regenbogen" only appears as an acoustic version on Irgendwas gegen die Stille.) | 2015 | — | — | — | | Irgendwas gegen die Stille |
| "Musik sein" | 2016 | 27 | 8 | 10 | BVMI: Platinum; IFPI AUT: Gold | Irgendwas gegen die Stille |
| "Feuerwerk" | 2017 | 26 | — | 28 | BVMI: Platinum; IFPI AUT: Gold | Irgendwas gegen die Stille |
| "Frische Luft" | 2017 | 79 | — | — | BVMI: Gold | Irgendwas gegen die Stille |
| "An Wunder" | 2018 | 12 | 22 | 7 | BVMI: Gold; IFPI AUT: Gold | Irgendwie anders |
| "Hier mit dir" | 2018 | 60 | — | 45 | BVMI: Gold | Irgendwie anders |
| "Pläne" | 2019 | 76 | — | — | | Irgendwie anders |
| "Kaum erwarten" | 2019 | 51 | — | 87 | BVMI: Gold | Irgendwie anders |
| "Einmal im Leben" (Note: "Einmal im Leben" only appears on the deluxe version of Irgendwie anders.) | 2019 | 60 | — | 37 | | Irgendwie anders |
| "Kein Lied" (Note: "Kein Lied" only appears on the deluxe version of Irgendwie anders.) | 2019 | — | — | — | | Irgendwie anders |
| "Was habt ihr gedacht" (Note: "Was habt ihr gedacht" was only released as a piano version.) | 2021 | — | — | — | | Vielleicht irgendwann |
| "Wie es mal war" | 2021 | 46 | — | — | | Vielleicht irgendwann |
| "Wer wenn nicht wir" | 2021 | 12 | 65 | 51 | BVMI: Gold; IFPI AUT: Gold | Vielleicht irgendwann |
| "Wo die Liebe hinfällt" | 2021 | 69 | — | — | | Vielleicht irgendwann |
| "Winter" | 2021 | — | — | — | | Vielleicht irgendwann |
| "Die guten Zeiten" (featuring Johannes Oerding) | 2021 | 14 | — | — | | Vielleicht irgendwann |
| "Morgen" (Note: "Morgen" only appears on the deluxe version of Vielleicht irgendwann.) | 2022 | 11 | — | 87 | | Vielleicht irgendwann |
| "Irgendwie auch nicht" (Note: "Irgendwie auch nicht" only appears on the deluxe version of Vielleicht irgendwann.) | 2022 | — | — | — | | Vielleicht irgendwann |
| "Auf den Grund" | 2022 | — | — | — | | Irgendwo ankommen |
| "Alleine bin" | 2023 | — | — | — | | Irgendwo ankommen |
| "Bleiben wir" | 2023 | — | — | — | | Irgendwo ankommen |
| "Spring" (featuring Forty) | 2023 | — | — | — | | Irgendwo ankommen |
| "Stiehl mir die Show" | 2023 | — | — | — | | Non-album single |
| "Schenk mir Zeit" | 2023 | — | — | — | | Wincents Weisse Weihnachten |
| "Weihnachten zu Zweit" | 2023 | — | — | — | | Wincents Weisse Weihnachten |
| "Nur kurz vorbei" | 2023 | — | — | — | | Wincents Weisse Weihnachten |
| "Jeden Tag Weihnachten" | 2024 | 70 | — | — | | Wincents Weisse Weihnachten (2024 Edition) |
| "Irgendwer" | 2024 | — | — | — | | Wincents Weisse Weihnachten (2024 Edition) |
| "Langsam" | 2025 | — | — | — | | Hast du kurz Zeit |
| "Hast du kurz Zeit" | 2025 | 68 | — | — | | Hast du kurz Zeit |
| "Sommer der bleibt" | 2025 | — | — | — | | Hast du kurz Zeit |
| "Lang nicht hier" | 2025 | — | — | — | | Hast du kurz Zeit |
"—" denotes a recording that did not chart.

=== As featured artist ===
| Title | Year | Peak chart positions | | Certifications | Album |
| Title | Year | GER | AUT | Certifications | Album |
|---|---|---|---|---|---|
| "Unter meiner Haut" (Gestört aber GeiL & Koby Funk featuring Wincent Weiss) | 2015 | 6 | 25 | BVMI: 2× Platinum | Gestört aber GeiL |
| "So gut" (Achtabahn featuring Wincent Weiss) | 2020 | — | — | | Non-album single |
| "Ihr kriegt uns nie mehr klein" (Dikka featuring Wincent Weiss) | 2021 | — | — | | Boom Schakkalakka |
| "Boom Schakkalakka" (Dikka featuring Wincent Weiss) | 2021 | — | — | | Boom Schakkalakka |
"—" denotes a recording that did not chart.

=== Promotional singles ===
| Title | Year | Peak chart positions | Album |
| Title | Year | GER | Album |
|---|---|---|---|
| "Nur ein Herzschlag entfernt" | 2017 | 80 | Irgendwas gegen die Stille |

=== Other charted songs ===
| Title | Year | Peak chart positions | | Album |
| Title | Year | GER | AUT | Album |
|---|---|---|---|---|
| "Weit weg" | 2021 | 90 | — | Vielleicht irgendwann |
| "Beste Zeit im Jahr" | 2023 | 73 | — | Wincents Weisse Weihnachten |
| "Weihnachten mit dir" | 2024 | 25 | 22 | Wincents Weisse Weihnachten |
"—" denotes a recording that did not chart.

== Awards and nominations ==
=== Results ===
| Year | Award | Nomination | Work | Result | Ref. |
|---|---|---|---|---|---|
| 2017 | Nickelodeon Kids' Choice Awards | Favourite Star (Germany, Austria, Switzerland) | Himself | Nominated | |
| 2017 | MTV Europe Music Awards | Best German Act | Himself | Won | |
| 2017 | Audi Generation Awards | Music | Himself | Won | |
| 2017 | Goldene Henne | Newcomer of the Year | Himself | Nominated | |
| 2018 | Echo Awards | Musician Pop National | Irgendwas gegen die Stille | Nominated | |
| 2018 | Echo Awards | Newcomer National | Himself | Won | |
| 2018 | Radio Regenbogen Awards | Pop National | Himself | Won | |
| 2019 | Nickelodeon Kids' Choice Awards | Favourite Musician (Germany, Austria, Switzerland) | Himself | Nominated | |
| 2019 | Nickelodeon Kids' Choice Awards | Favourite Song (Germany, Austria, Switzerland) | An Wunder | Nominated | |
| 2019 | Goldene Henne | Music | Himself | Won | |
| 2019 | Goldene Kamera Digital Awards | Best Music Act | Himself | Won | |
| 2019 | Bravo Otto Awards | Musician National | Himself | Gold | |
| 2020 | Bravo Otto Awards | Musician National | Himself | Gold | |
| 2020 | Nickelodeon Kids' Choice Awards | Favourite Musician (Germany, Austria, Switzerland) | Himself | Nominated | |
| 2021 | Goldene Henne | Music | Himself | Won | |
