= 187 Strassenbande =

German hip hop group

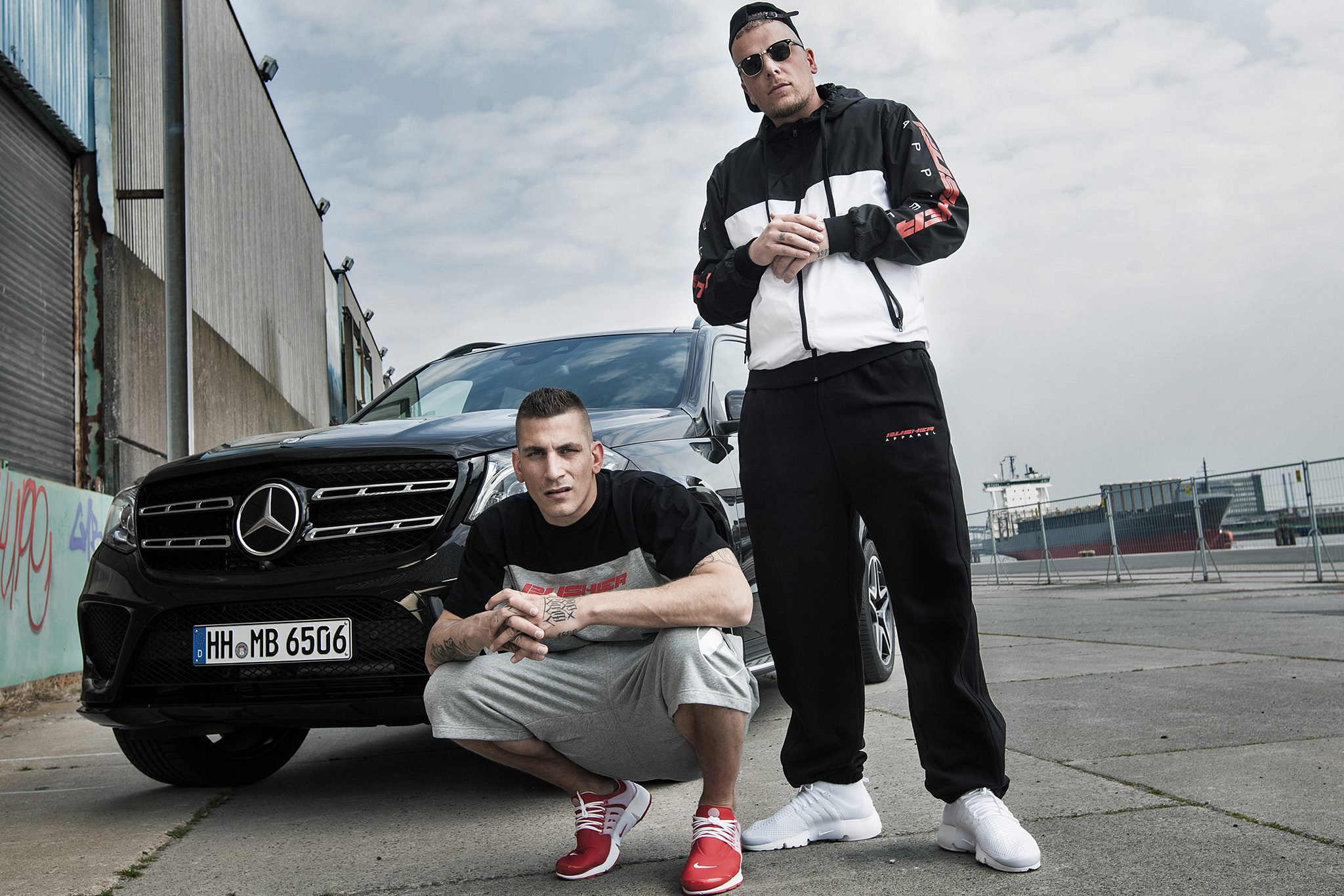
- Gzuz (left) and Bonez MC, major members of 187 Strassenbande

Background information
- Origin: Hamburg, Germany
- Genres: Gangsta rap; trap
- Years active: 2006–present
- Members: Bonez MC (rapper); Gzuz (rapper); LX (rapper); Maxwell (rapper); Sa4 (rapper); Jambeatz (producer)
- Past members: AchtVier (rapper, until 2013); Mosh36 (rapper, until 2013); Hasuna (rapper, until 2015)
- Website: 187-strassenbande.de

187 Strassenbande (German for "187 streetgang") is a German hip hop and urban music formation joining a great number of German rappers mostly based in Hamburg formed in 2006. It is made up of Gzuz, Bonez MC, Maxwell, LX and Sa4, taggers and graffiti artists Frost, Gel and Track, producers Jambeatz, Lukas H, 95a and nightclub owner Blanchy. Other members included AchtVier, Hasuna and Mosh36 who left for various reasons between 2013 and 2015. The formation is considered to be a part of the gangsta rap movement in Germany.

== Career ==
The group was established by Bonez MC and Frost releasing their rap work Deep Cover. Starting initially as a hip-hop graffiti crew, it developed into a street band as a collaboration between many rappers mainly from Hamburg. After self-released independent releases, Bonez MC's album Krampfthaft Kriminell charted on the German albums chart in 2012. The same year, the Berlin-based Mosh36 joined. Gzuz, a rapper in the band was jailed for three years and six months for predatory theft, prompting the band to organize the Free Gzuz Tour. In 2014, AchtVier left the band. In the same year, the album High & Hungrig by band members Gzuz and Bonez MC made it to the Top 10 of albums on the German chart. In 2015, Maxwell and LX released their joint Obststand.

Because of their popularity, the band accompanied the group Wu-Tang Clan on their Germany tour in 2015. Also that year, Gzuz released his solo album Ebbe und Flut. In 2016, Bonez MC's album with rapper RAF Camora topped the German charts.

187 Strassenbande's 2017 release Sampler 4 has topped the German, Austrian and Swiss Albums Charts.

== Discography ==
=== Samplers ===
Year	Title	Chart		
Year	Title	GER	AUT	SWI
2009	187 Strassenbande	—	—	—
2011	Der Sampler II	—	—	—
2015	Der Sampler III	2	16	18
2017	Sampler 4	1	1	1
2021	Sampler 5	1	1	1

=== EPs ===
Year	Title	Chart		
Year	Title	GER	AUT	SWI
2016	187 Allstars EP	52	52	23

=== Singles ===
Year	Title	Chart			Album
Year	Title	GER	AUT	SWI	Album
2017	"Mit den Jungz" (Gzuz, Bonez MC & LX)	11	45	62	Sampler 4
2017	"Millionär" (Bonez MC, Gzuz)	2	29	32	Sampler 4

=== Other charted songs ===
Year	Title	Chart		Album
Year	Title	GER	AUT	Album
2017	"High Life" (Bonez MC, RAF Camora, Gzuz & Maxwell)	30	67	Sampler 4
2017	"Sitzheizung" (Gzuz & Bonez MC)	35	–	Sampler 4
2017	"100er Batzen" (Sa4, Gzuz, Bonez MC & LX)	45	–	Sampler 4
2017	"Lächeln" (Bonez MC)	53	–	Sampler 4
2017	"30er Zone" (LX, Sa4 & Maxwell)	59	–	Sampler 4
2017	"24/7" (LX)	60	–	Sampler 4
2017	"Zeit ist Geld" (Sa4, Bonez MC & Gzuz)	61	–	Sampler 4
2017	"Was ist passiert?!" (Bonez MC, LX & Gzuz)	72	–	Sampler 4
2017	"Meine Message" (Maxwell)	75	–	Sampler 4
2017	"Intro" (LX, Sa4 & Maxwell)	77	–	Sampler 4
2017	"Ballermann" (LX, Gzuz & Bonez MC)	81	–	Sampler 4
2017	"10 Dinger" (LX & Maxwell)	84	–	Sampler 4
2017	"International" (Sa4)	98	–	Sampler 4

=== Bonez MC ===
Bonez MC, real name John Lorenz Moser was born in Hamburg on 23 December 1985. In addition to membership in 187 Strassenbande, in 2012 he appeared on his own label Toprott Muzik with his solo album Krampfhaft kriminell followed in 2013 with the EP Kontra K. In 2014, he released his collaborative album with Gzuz titled High & hungrig. It rose to # 9 in the German charts and paved the way for commercial success and the follow-up High & hungrig 2 in 2016. It topped the German Albums Chart. His uncle plays guitar in the English band The Stranglers.

=== Gzuz ===
Gzuz, real name Kristoffer Jonas Klauß also known as Gazo was born in Hamburg on 29 June 1988. His artistic name Gzuz comes from Ghetto-Zeug unzensiert. In October 2010, he was sentenced to three years and six months in prison for robbery theft. During his imprisonment, 187 Strassenbande completed a "Free Gzuz Tour" in 2012 and sold Gzuz merchandise, such as Free Gzuz T-shirts to support him financially while incarcerated. After his release in 2013 he took part in the tour and had big success in his collaboration with Bonez MC with the album High & hungrig in 2014 and High & hungrig 2 in 2016 with the latter topping the German Albums Chart. Between the two albums, on 9 October 2015 he released his solo album Ebbe & Flut with the album reaching number 2 in German Albums Chart.

Discography

Year	Title	Chart		
Year	Title	GER	AUT	SWI
2014	High & hungrig (with Bonez MC)	9	28	36
2015	Ebbe & Flut (solo)	1	8	7
2016	High & hungrig 2 (with Bonez MC)	1	2	2
2018	Wolke 7 (solo)	1	2	2

=== Maxwell ===
Maxwell, real name Max Kwabena, was born in Hamburg on 23 March 1993 and grew up in Hamburg's Hohenfelde district. He spent a lot of time with Bonez MC and Gzuz initially but somehow relations cooled off. A few years later, he met Bonez MC again and was incorporated in 187 Strassenbande. He was included in two tracks in High & hungrig. Being close to LX, another member of 187 Strassenbande and in 2015 he released a collaborative album Obststand with LX making it to number 5 on the German Album Chart. Together with LX, he was nominated at the Echoverleihung awards in 2016 as "Best newcomer". On 24 March 2017 Maxwell released his debut album Kohldampf, a 3-CD album. It reached number 2 on the German Albums Chart.

Discography

Year	Title	Chart		
Year	Title	GER	AUT	SWI
2015	Obststand (with LX)	5	36	12
2017	Kohldampf (solo)	2	3	10

=== LX ===
LX was born as Alexander Hutzler in Hamburg on 3 September 1986. He had a very difficult childhood growing up in Hamburger Plattenbauten. He started rapping in 2006 eventually joining 187 Strassenbande debuting with the third sampler of the group after being picked by Bonez MC. His pseudonym LX is a stylization of his real name Alex. He was close to Maxwell another member of 187 Strassenbande and in 2015 he released a collaborative album Obststand with Maxwell making it to number 5 on the German Album Chart. Less than a month after the release of the album, LX was arrested and charged with several violent crimes and sentenced to 22 months in prison, before being released after serving only a part of his jail sentence. Together with Maxwell, he was nominated at the Echoverleihung awards in 2016 as "Best newcomer". However he could not attend the celebrations because he did not get a clearance for the event.

Discography

Year	Title	Chart		
Year	Title	GER	AUT	SWI
2015	Obststand (with Maxwell)	5	36	12

=== Sa4 ===
Sa4 was born as Anton Kolja Pehrs in Hamburg. He met Bonez MC while on the label Jentown Crhyme. 187 Strassenbande was more like a graffiti crew at the time. In 2009 Sa4 released his mixtape Undercover. In 2016, he released the Nebensache EP, which was part of the box set of the album High & Hungrig 2 by Bonez MC and Gzuz. His EP was made available as a stand-alone EP in January 2017 for downloads. Sa4 was represented on all four samplers of the 187 Strassenbande with several contributions. On 10 November 2017, he released his debut solo album Neue Deutsche Quelle that made it to number 3 on the German Albums Chart. Like most member outputs of 187 Strassenbande, his style is gangsta rap and street rap talking about crime on Hamburg streets.

Discography
Albums

Year	Title	Chart		
Year	Title	GER	AUT	SWI
2017	Neue deutsche Quelle	3	2	23

EPs

Year	Title	Chart		
Year	Title	GER	AUT	SWI
2009	Undercover	–	–	–

Singles

Year	Title	Chart			Album
Year	Title	GER	AUT	SWI	Album
2017	"Schnell machen"	11	25	36	Neue deutsche Quelle
2017	"Rush Hour"	59	–	–	Neue deutsche Quelle
2017	"Allstars" (Sa4 feat. Maxwell, Gzuz, LX & Bonez MC)	15	40	61	Neue deutsche Quelle

Featured in

Year	Title	Chart		
Year	Title	GER	AUT	SWI
2019	"HaifischNikez Allstars" (LX & Maxwell feat. Bonez MC, Gzuz & Sa4)	3	5	9

== Former members ==
=== AchtVier ===
AchtVier, real name Timo Molloisch, was born on 26 October 1984. He left the band in 2014. AchtVier was keen on following a solo career after his first solo album Aufstand in 2011. In 2013 he released his second album Wohlstand in 2013 making it to the Top 20 in the German Albums Chart. He announced his separation from the band on 14 June 2014. He has continued to release further solo album and in 2016 AchtVier founded his own record label Steuerfrei Money signing Hamburg rapper TaiMo.

Year	Title	Chart		
Year	Title	GER	AUT	SWI
2013	Aufstand	39	–	–
2014	Wohlstand	19	78	–
2015	Molotov	16	61	48
2016	50/50 (with Said)	29	–	–
2017	Mr. F	21	63	84

=== Hasuna ===
Hussain M. (Hasuna) was born in 1991 (or 1992) and comes from Lebanon. He entered 187 Strassenbande in 2010. A few months later, in 2011, he was imprisoned for about three years due to attack with a knife. He got kicked out of the gang in 2015 because of attempted murder against one of the gang members.

=== Mosh36 ===
Mosh 36, real name Shervin Rahmani, is a rapper with Iranian roots and was born in Berlin-Spandau on 25 December 1987 before moving to Hamburg in 2008. While in 187 Strassenbande, he pursued a solo career and in 2010 together with rapper Said, he had his first EP Jib followed two years later by the debut album Moshroom. In autumn of 2013, Mosh36 released his mixtape BZ (standing for Berlins Zukunft). He left the band in 2013. His third album Unikat and his first after leaving 187 Strassenbande released in 2015 reached number 7 on the German Albums Chart. On 15 December 2016, it was announced that Mosh36 had signed on PA Sports label Life is Pain and will release his music from there.

Discography

Year	Title	Chart		
Year	Title	GER	AUT	SWI
2010	Jib Ihm (EP) (with Said)	–	–	–
2013	BZ (mixtape)	38	–	95
2013	Unikat	7	32	22
2015	Unikat	7	32	22
2015	Lucky No.7 (EP)	28	72	41
2016	Rapbeduine	18	61	43
2017	DZ	25	73	65
