= Bausa (rapper) =

German rapper and singer

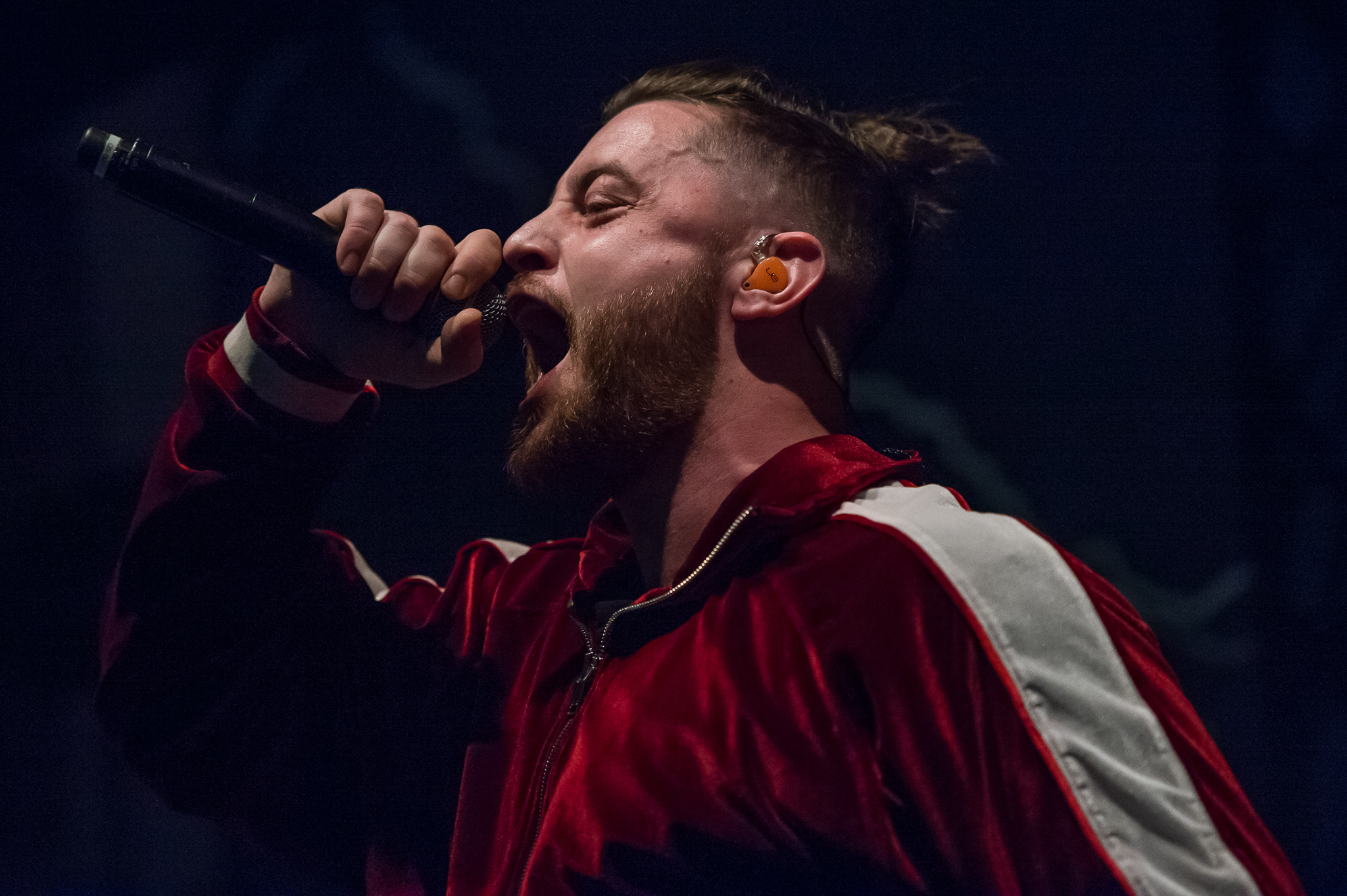
- Bausa in 2018

Background information
- Also known as: Baui
- Born: Julian Otto; June 1989 (age 36); Saarbrücken, West Germany
- Genres: German hip hop, trap, cloud rap
- Occupations: Rapper, singer
- Years active: 2010–present
- Labels: Hitmonks, Downbeat Records

Julian Otto, better known by his stage name Bausa (born in Saarbrücken, Germany in 1989), is a German rapper and singer known for his many collaborations and hits. Bausa also plays the guitar and piano, and composes his own songs in a Bietigheim-Bissingen recording studio.

In 2014, Bausa released his EP Seelenmanöver on Capo's label Hitmonks. His 2017 album Dreifarbenhaus reached number 10 on the German Albums Chart also charting in Austria and Switzerland. His single "Was du Liebe nennst" peaked at number one on German Singles Chart for eight consecutive weeks. It was certified 7× Gold in Germany. The song also topped the Austrian Singles Chart.

== Discography ==
- Dreifarbenhaus (2017)
- Fieber (2019)
- 100 Pro (2021)
