= Loredana discography =

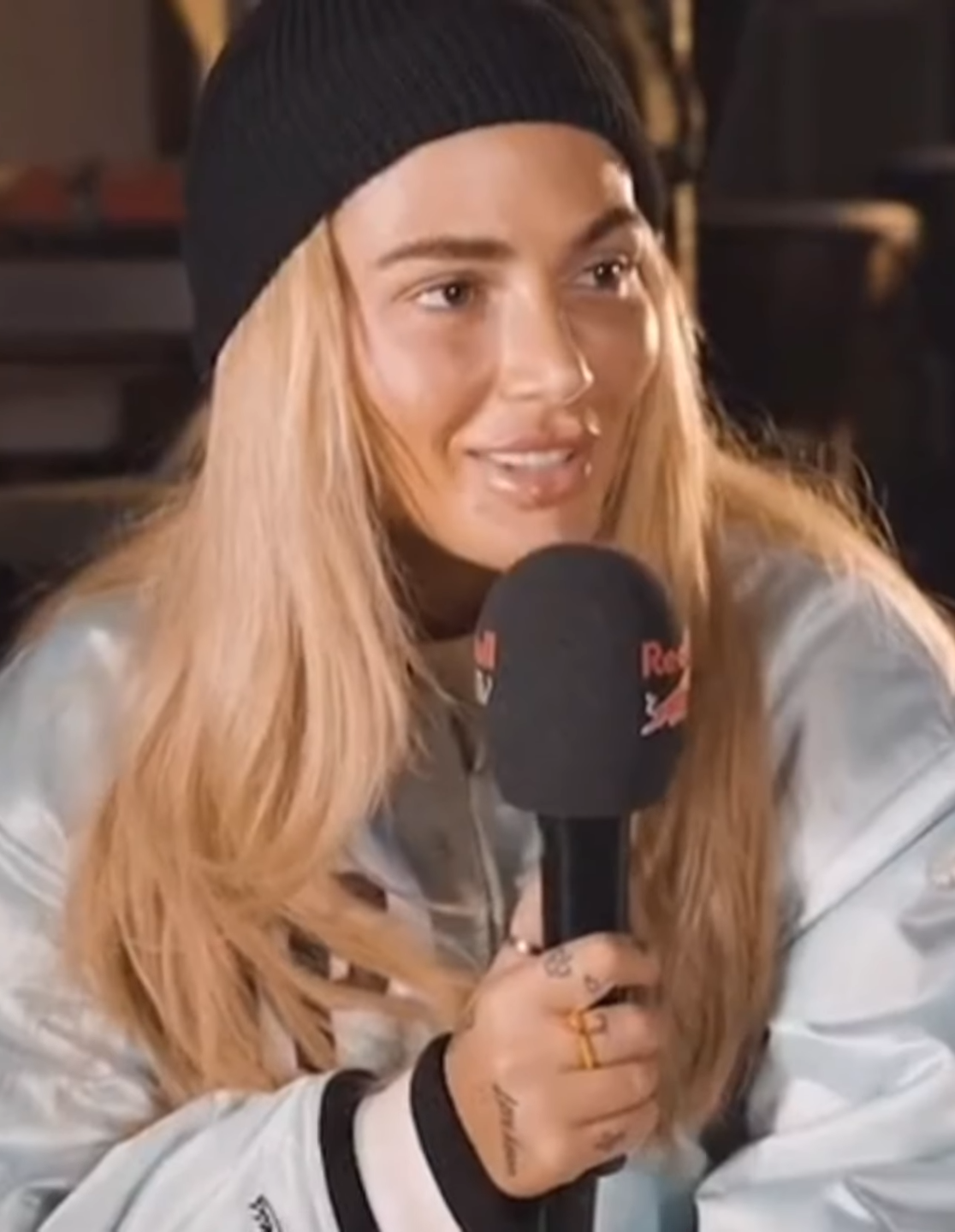
- Zefi in November 2021
- Studio albums: 2
- Collaborative albums: 1
- Singles as lead artist: 27
- Singles as featured artist: 9

Kosovar rapper Loredana has released two studio albums, and a collaborative album. She has also released 25 singles as a lead artist, and six as a featured artist.

== Albums ==
=== Studio albums ===
List of studio albums, with selected chart positions
Title	Album details	Peak chart positions		
Title	Album details	SWI	AUT	GER
King Lori	Released: 13 September 2019; Label: Independent; Formats: CD, Digital download, streaming	2	2	3
Medusa	Released: 11 December 2020; Label: Independent, Groove Attack; Formats: CD, digital download, streaming	19	17	15

=== Collaborative albums ===
List of collaborative albums, with selected chart positions
Title	Album details	Peak chart positions		
Title	Album details	SWI	AUT	GER
No Rich Parents (with Mozzik)	Released: 24 September 2021; Label: Independent, Groove Attack; Formats: CD, digital download, streaming	5	29	8

=== Mixtapes ===
List of mixtapes, with selected chart positions
Title	Album details	Peak chart positions		
Title	Album details	SWI	AUT	GER
Mann im Haus	Released: 27 January 2023; Label: Independent, Groove Attack; Formats: digital download, streaming	16	68	70

== Singles ==
=== As lead artist ===
List of singles with selected chart positions and certifications
Title	Year	Peak chart positions					Certifications	Album
Title	Year	SWI	ALB	AUT	GER	WW	Certifications	Album
"Sonnenbrille"	2018	13	10	8	12	—	IFPI SWI: Platinum; IFPI AUT: Gold; BVMI: Gold	Non-album singles
"Bonnie & Clyde" (with Mozzik)	2018	2	—	3	3	—	IFPI SWI: Platinum; IFPI AUT: Platinum; BVMI: Gold	Non-album singles
"Milliondollar$mile"	2018	30	—	19	11	—	IFPI SWI: Gold; IFPI AUT: Gold	Non-album singles
"Romeo & Juliet" (with Mozzik)	2019	4	3	4	2	—	IFPI SWI: Gold; IFPI AUT: Gold; BVMI: Gold	Non-album singles
"Labyrinth"	2019	17	69	10	10	—	IFPI SWI: Gold; IFPI AUT: Gold	King Lori
"Jetzt rufst du an"	2019	4	—	3	2	—	IFPI SWI: Platinum; IFPI AUT: Platinum; BVMI: Gold	King Lori
"Eiskalt" (featuring Mozzik)	2019	7	37	2	2	—	IFPI SWI: Platinum; IFPI AUT: Platinum; BVMI: Platinum	King Lori
"Kein Plan" (featuring Mero)	2019	4	—	2	1	—	IFPI SWI: Gold; IFPI AUT: Gold; BVMI: Gold	King Lori
"Genick"	2019	3	58	3	3	—	IFPI SWI: Gold; IFPI AUT: Gold; BVMI: Gold	King Lori
"Mit dir"	2019	20	—	29	9	—		Non-album singles
"Kein Wort" (with Juju)	2020	3	—	1	1	—	IFPI SWI: 2× Platinum; IFPI AUT: Gold; BVMI: Platinum	Non-album singles
"Angst" (featuring Rymez)	2020	3	—	1	1	—	IFPI SWI: Gold; IFPI AUT: Gold	Non-album singles
"Intro"	2020	—	—	—	—	—		Medusa
"Checka" (with Delara)	2020	5	—	4	2	—	IFPI SWI: Gold; IFPI AUT: Gold	Medusa
"Rockstar"	2020	24	—	26	17	—		Medusa
"Tut mir nicht leid"	2020	14	—	10	4	—		Medusa
"Gangster"	2020	75	—	67	37	—		Medusa
"Rosenkrieg" (with Mozzik)	2021	2	13	5	1	146		No Rich Parents
"Oh Digga" (with Mozzik)	2021	27	6	44	27	—		No Rich Parents
"Nëse don" (with Mozzik)	2021	16	3	22	10	—		No Rich Parents
"Mit mir" (with Mozzik)	2021	13	—	18	12	—		No Rich Parents
"Pinky Promises"	2022	82	—	—	73	—		Mann im Haus
"Ballade" (with Céline, Macloud and Miksu)	2022	75	—	51	26	—		Non-album single
"Let's Go"	2022	—	—	—	91	—		Mann im Haus
"Intro Mixed Feelings"	2022	—	—	—	—	—		Mann im Haus
"Blicke"	2022	—	—	—	—	—		Mann im Haus
"Oft vertraut"	2023	71	—	—	53	—		Mann im Haus
"Gallery Dept"	2023	—	—	—	—	—		Non-album single
"—" denotes a recording that did not chart or was not released in that territory.

=== As featured artist ===
List of singles as featured artist, with selected chart positions and certifications
Title	Year	Peak chart positions						Certifications	Album
Title	Year	SWI	ALB	AUT	FRA	GER	POR	Certifications	Album
"Djadja (Remix)" (Aya Nakamura featuring Loredana)	2018	—	—	—	—	43	109	IFPI AUT: Gold; BVMI: Gold	Nakamura
"On m'a tourné le dos" (Jul featuring Loredana)	2018	—	—	—	164	—	—		La zone en personne
"Du bist mein" (with Srno and Zuna)	2020	3	—	2	—	1	—	IFPI SWI: Gold; IFPI AUT: Gold; BVMI: Gold	Mele7 2
"Nicht verdient" (Capital Bra feat. Loredana)	2020	1	—	1	—	1	—	IFPI AUT: Gold; BVMI: Gold	CB7
"Geh dein Weg" (KC Rebell and Summer Cem featuring Loredana)	2020	8	—	6	—	4	—		Maximum III
"Nice to Meet Ya (Remix)" (Wes Nelson featuring Loredana)	2021	—	—	—	—	—	—	IFPI AUT: Platinum; BVMI: Gold	Non-album singles
"Gjuj për to" (Don Xhoni featuring Loredana)	2021	36	1	—	—	—	—		Non-album singles
"Heart Attack" (Noizy featuring Loredana)	2022	3	1	42	—	61	—		Non-album singles
"Kriminelle" (Yll Limani featuring Loredana)	2022	58	—	—	—	—	—		Non-album singles
"—" denotes a recording that did not chart or was not released in that territory.

=== Other charted songs ===
List of songs with selected chart positions
Title	Year	Peak chart positions			Album
Title	Year	SWI	AUT	GER	Album
"Gib mir nicht die Schuld" (Dardan featuring Loredana)	2020	79	—	—	Soko Disko
"Wenn ich will" (Capital Bra featuring Loredana)	2020	78	—	—	CB7
"Kein Hunger" (featuring Ufo361)	2020	17	17	9	Medusa
"Immer wenn es regnet" (with Mozzik)	2021	23	31	19	No Rich Parents
"Du & ich" (with Mozzik)	2021	93	—	—	No Rich Parents
