= List of number-one hits of 2020 (Austria) =

This is a list of the Austrian number-one singles and albums of 2020 as compiled by Ö3 Austria Top 40, the official chart provider of Austria.

Issue date	Song	Artist	Album	Artist
3 January	"All I Want for Christmas Is You"	Mariah Carey	The Christmas Present	Robbie Williams
10 January	"Dance Monkey"	Tones and I	Frozen II	Various artists
17 January	"Maschine"	RAF Camora and The Cratez	Liebes-Tattoo	Daniela Alfinito
24 January	"Dance Monkey"	Tones and I	Neujahrskonzert 2020	Andris Nelsons and Vienna Philharmonic
31 January	"Kein Wort"	Juju and Loredana	Grün	Die Draufgänger
7 February	"Donuts"	Gzuz	Music to Be Murdered By	Eminem
14 February	"Baby"	Joker Bra and Vize	Zenit	RAF Camora
21 February	"Baby"	Joker Bra and Vize	50 Jahre: Unsere Schlager von damals	Die Amigos
28 February	"Blinding Lights"	The Weeknd	Gzuz	Gzuz
6 March	"Blinding Lights"	The Weeknd	Map of the Soul: 7	BTS
13 March	"Blinding Lights"	The Weeknd	Böhse Onkelz	Böhse Onkelz
20 March	"Angst"	Loredana featuring Rymez	Böhse Onkelz	Böhse Onkelz
27 March	"Blinding Lights"	The Weeknd	Brot & Spiele	Haze
3 April	"Blinding Lights"	The Weeknd	After Hours	The Weeknd
10 April	"Blinding Lights"	The Weeknd	Gigaton	Pearl Jam
17 April	"Blinding Lights"	The Weeknd	25 Years Later	The Kelly Family
24 April	"Shotz Fired"	Bonez MC	Herzenssache	Ramon Roselly
1 May	"Blinding Lights"	The Weeknd	Jibrail und Iblis	Samra
8 May	"90-60-111"	Shirin David	Rich Rich	Ufo361
15 May	"Nicht verdient"	Capital Bra and Loredana	Herzenssache	Ramon Roselly
22 May	"Fame"	Apache 207	Mosaik	Andrea Berg
29 May	"Fame"	Apache 207	Sommer, Sonne, Honolulu	Calimeros
5 June	"Roadrunner"	Bonez MC	Sing meinen Song – Das Tauschkonzert, Vol. 7	Various artists
12 June	"In meinem Benz"	AK Ausserkontrolle and Bonez MC	Chromatica	Lady Gaga
19 June	"Rockstar"	DaBaby and Roddy Ricch	Das Album	Thomas Anders and Florian Silbereisen
26 June	"Emotions"	Ufo361	Das Album	Thomas Anders and Florian Silbereisen
3 July	"Big Body Benz"	Bonez MC	Rough and Rowdy Ways	Bob Dylan
10 July	"Savage Love (Laxed – Siren Beat)"	Jawsh 685 and Jason Derulo	Rough and Rowdy Ways	Bob Dylan
17 July	"Bläulich"	Apache 207	Shoot for the Stars, Aim for the Moon	Pop Smoke
24 July	"Savage Love (Laxed – Siren Beat)"	Jawsh 685 and Jason Derulo	Tausend Träume	Die Amigos
31 July	"Savage Love (Laxed – Siren Beat)"	Jawsh 685 and Jason Derulo	Rough and Rowdy Ways	Bob Dylan
7 August	"Savage Love (Laxed – Siren Beat)"	Jawsh 685 and Jason Derulo	10.000 bunte Luftballons	Fantasy
14 August	"Savage Love (Laxed – Siren Beat)"	Jawsh 685 and Jason Derulo	Treppenhaus	Apache 207
21 August	"Savage Love (Laxed – Siren Beat)"	Jawsh 685 and Jason Derulo	Whoosh!	Deep Purple
28 August	"Savage Love (Laxed – Siren Beat)"	Jawsh 685 and Jason Derulo	Tandem	Julian Le Play
4 September	"Frühstück in Paris"	Capital Bra and Cro	A.S.S.N. 2	AK Ausserkontrolle
11 September	"Mood"	24kGoldn featuring Iann Dior	S&M2	Metallica and San Francisco Symphony
18 September	"Mood"	24kGoldn featuring Iann Dior	Goats Head Soup	The Rolling Stones
25 September	"Mood"	24kGoldn featuring Iann Dior	Hollywood	Bonez MC
2 October	"Mood"	24kGoldn featuring Iann Dior	CB7	Capital Bra
9 October	"Mood"	24kGoldn featuring Iann Dior	Vollmond	Kontra K
16 October	"Mood"	24kGoldn featuring Iann Dior	Nur für dich	Ufo361 and Sonus030
23 October	"Mood"	24kGoldn featuring Iann Dior	Liebe für die Ewigkeiten	Kastelruther Spatzen
30 October	"Mood"	24kGoldn featuring Iann Dior	Maximum III	KC Rebell and Summer Cem
6 November	"Angeklagt"	Bonez MC	Letter to You	Bruce Springsteen
13 November	"Angeklagt"	Bonez MC	LederHosenRock	Melissa Naschenweng
20 November	"Mood"	24kGoldn featuring Iann Dior	LederHosenRock	Melissa Naschenweng
27 November	"Mood"	24kGoldn featuring Iann Dior	Power Up	AC/DC
4 December	"Mood"	24kGoldn featuring Iann Dior	A Volks-Rock'n'Roll Christmas	Andreas Gabalier
11 December	"All I Want for Christmas Is You"	Mariah Carey	A Volks-Rock'n'Roll Christmas	Andreas Gabalier
18 December	"All I Want for Christmas Is You"	Mariah Carey	A Volks-Rock'n'Roll Christmas	Andreas Gabalier
25 December	"All I Want for Christmas Is You"	Mariah Carey	A Volks-Rock'n'Roll Christmas	Andreas Gabalier
