= Eiskalt (song) =

2019 single by Loredana featuring Mozzik

- The official cover for "Eiskalt"

Single by Loredana featuring Mozzik

from the album King Lori
- Released: 2 August 2019
- Length: 2:59
- Label: Groove Attack; Loredana
- Songwriters: Gramoz Aliu; Loredana Zefi
- Producers: Joshua Allery; Laurin Auth

Loredana singles chronology
"Jetzt rufst du an" (2019)	"Eiskalt" (2019)	"Kein Plan" (2019)

Mozzik singles chronology
"Pinocchio" (2019)	"Eiskalt" (2019)	"Dhelper Dinake" (2019)

Music video
- "Eiskalt" on YouTube

"Eiskalt" (German pronunciation: [ˈaɪskalt]; transl. "(Ice)cold") is a song by Kosovar rapper Loredana featuring Kosovo-Albanian rapper Mozzik, released as the third single from the former's debut studio album, King Lori (2019). The song was written by the aforementioned rappers, and composed and produced by German producers Macloud and Miksu.

Commercially, "Eiskalt" experienced success reaching the top ten in Austria, Germany and Switzerland, and the top forty in Albania. Due to high sales, the song was certified gold in Austria and Germany by the Verband der Österreichischen Musikwirtschaft and Bundesverband Musikindustrie, respectively.

"Eiskalt" was musically described as a split between hip-hop, trap and pop incorporating Balkan elements. An official music video was uploaded on 1 August 2019 onto YouTube to accompany the single's release. The colorful video features Loredana and Mozzik performing to the song in a multitude of different colored scenes.

== Background ==
=== Composition and reception ===
"Eiskalt" marks the third time that the couple has collaborated musically on a recording, following their collaborations on "Bonnie & Clyde" and "Romeo & Juliet". The song was solely written by Loredana and Mozzik and mastered by German producer Lex Barkey. It was both composed and produced by German producers Macloud and Miksu. With a duration time of two minutes and fifty nine seconds, it is performed in the key of G♭ major in common time with a moderate tempo of 90 beats per minute.

The Swiss magazine Lyrics characterised "Eiskalt" as a typical "Loredana song" and expressed praise towards the "catchy hook, solid verses and the memorable beats". Two authors of the Swiss daily newspapers Blick and Basler Zeitung respectively gave the song itself generally negative reviews, criticising the provocative lyrics of "Eiskalt".

=== Music video ===
A scene from the music video portraying Loredana and Mozzik during the first scene

The accompanying music video was produced and shot by Fati.tv and premiered onto the official YouTube channel of Loredana on 18 March 2020, where it has since accumulated more than 48 million views.

The video visually opens with Loredana and Mozzik standing close to each other behind a frame and staring earnestly at the camera against a blue backdrop. Interspersed shots through the main plot portray both performing to the song in front of an orange backdrop decorated with white clouds. It continues in a similar way with solo shots of Loredana eating cornflakes against a red backdrop covered with lampshades, and Mozzik standing within a grey and neon yellow painted corridor. The visual then ends in the same way it opens with Loredana and Mozzik appearing in front of the blue backdrop of the beginning.

== Commercial performance ==
"Eiskalt" experienced commercially great success on record charts throughout German-speaking Europe. In Austria and Germany, the single debuted at number two and gained gold certifications for exceeding sales of 15,000 and 200,000 units, respectively. Beside that, it became Mozzik's third single to reach the top ten in the aforementioned countries, after "Bonnie & Clyde" and "Romeo & Juliet". "Eiskalt" further reached number seven in Switzerland and thirty seven on Albania's The Top List chart. For Loredana, the single's success helped her to achieve the top 10 for the fourth time in Austria, Germany and Switzerland, since her debut with "Sonnenbrille".

== Personnel ==
Credits adapted from Tidal.

- Loredana – performing, vocals, songwriting
- Mozzik – performing, vocals, songwriting
- Laurin Auth (Macloud) – composition, production
- Joshua Allery (Miksu) – composition, production

== Charts ==
Chart (2018)	Peak position
Albania (The Top List)	37
Austria (Ö3 Austria Top 40)	2
Germany (GfK)	2
Switzerland (Schweizer Hitparade)	7

== Certifications ==
Region	Certification	Certified units/sales
Austria (IFPI Austria)	Gold	15,000^{‡}
Germany (BVMI)	Gold	200,000^{‡}
^{‡} Sales+streaming figures based on certification alone.
