= List of number-one hits of 2020 (Germany) =

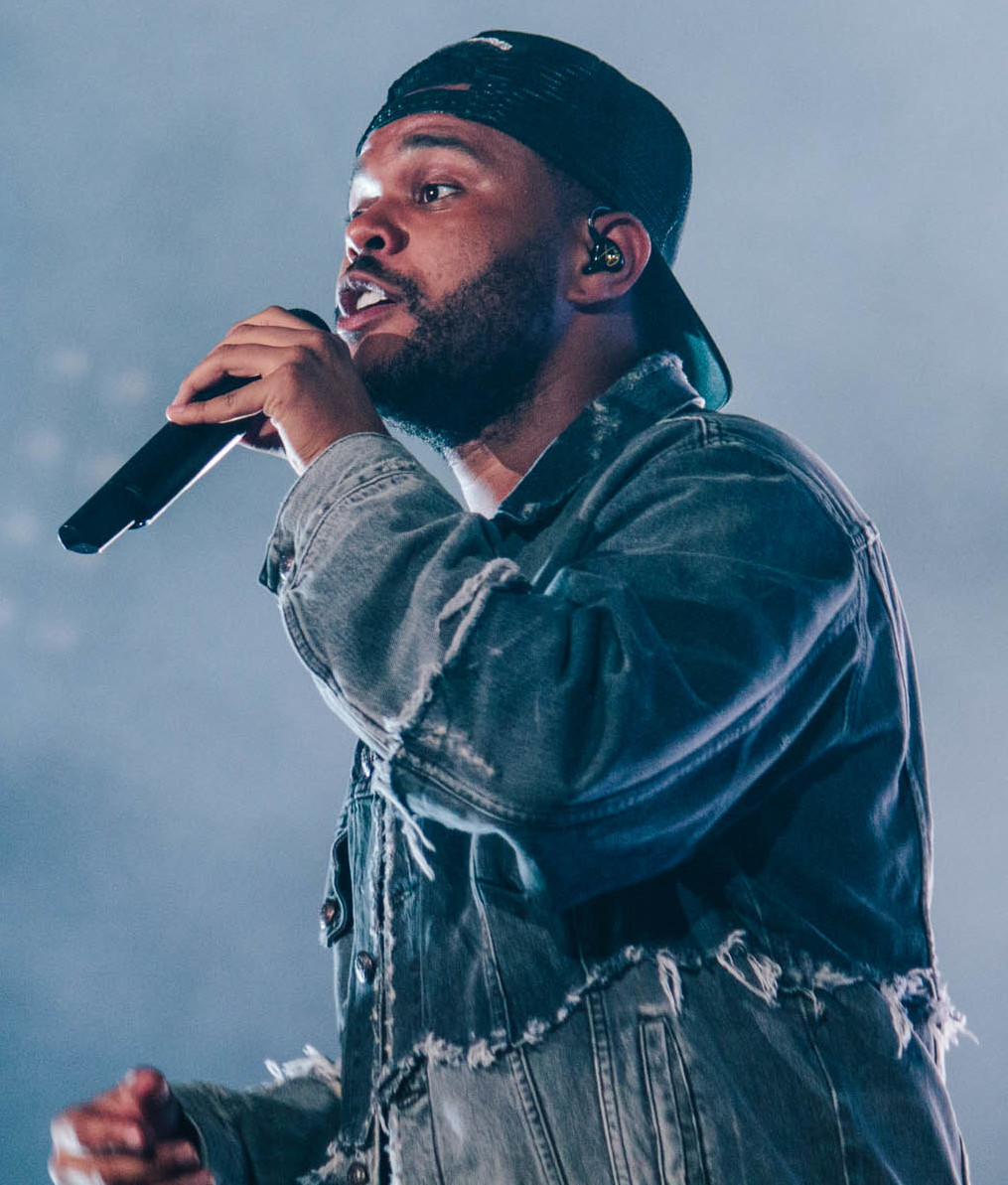
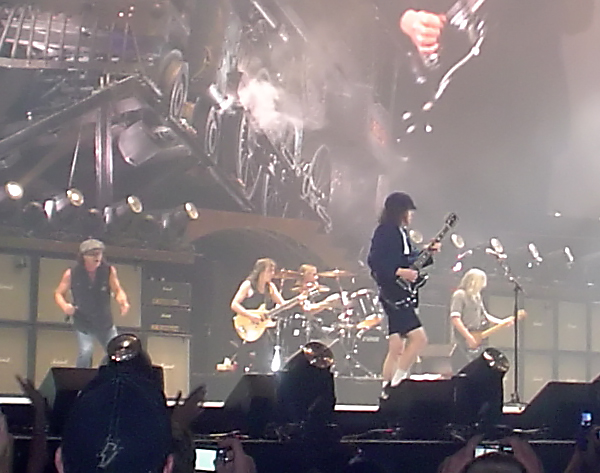
The Weeknd's "Blinding Lights" became the best-performing single of 2020, while AC/DC's "Power Up" became the best-performing album of the year.

The GfK Entertainment charts are record charts compiled by GfK Entertainment on behalf of the German record industry. They include the "Single Top 100" and the "Album Top 100" chart. The chart week runs from Friday to Thursday, and the chart compilations are published on Tuesday for the record industry. The entire top 100 singles and top 100 albums are officially released the following Friday by GfK Entertainment. The charts are based on sales of physical singles and albums from retail outlets as well as permanent music downloads.

== Number-one hits by week ==
Key
†	Indicates best-performing single and album of 2020

Issue date	Song	Artist	Ref.	Album	Artist	Ref.
3 January	"Dance Monkey"	Tones and I		Herz Kraft Werke	Sarah Connor	
10 January	"Blinding Lights" †	The Weeknd		Liebes-Tattoo	Daniela Alfinito	
17 January	"Blinding Lights" †	The Weeknd		Zenit	RAF Camora	
24 January	"Kein Wort"	Juju and Loredana		Boss Bitch	Katja Krasavice	
31 January	"Kein Wort"	Juju and Loredana		The Book of Fire	Mono Inc.	
7 February	"Baby"	Joker Bra and Vize		Golem	Tarek K.I.Z	
14 February	"Blinding Lights" †	The Weeknd		50 Jahre: Unsere Schlager von damals	Die Amigos	
21 February	"Blinding Lights" †	The Weeknd		Gzuz	Gzuz	
28 February	"Blinding Lights" †	The Weeknd		Map of the Soul: 7	BTS	
6 March	"Blinding Lights" †	The Weeknd		Böhse Onkelz	Böhse Onkelz	
13 March	"Angst"	Loredana featuring Rymez		Böhse Onkelz	Böhse Onkelz	
20 March	"Blinding Lights" †	The Weeknd		Im Namen der Liebe	Marianne Rosenberg	
27 March	"Blinding Lights" †	The Weeknd		Of Truth and Sacrifice	Heaven Shall Burn	
3 April	"Du bist mein"	Loredana, Zuna and SRNO		Atlantis	Fler	
10 April	"Eine Nacht"	Ramon Roselly		25 Years Later	The Kelly Family	
17 April	"Blinding Lights" †	The Weeknd		Human. :II: Nature.	Nightwish	
24 April	"Blinding Lights" †	The Weeknd		Jibrail & Iblis	Samra	
1 May	"90-60-111"	Shirin David		Rich Rich	Ufo361	
8 May	"Nicht verdient"	Capital Bra and Loredana		Corona Quarantäne Tape	Frei.Wild	
15 May	"Fame"	Apache 207		Kompass zur Sonne	In Extremo	
22 May	"Fame"	Apache 207		Wer sagt das?!	Ben Zucker	
29 May	"Roadrunner"	Bonez MC		Sing meinen Song – Das Tauschkonzert, Vol. 7	Various artists	
5 June	"In meinem Benz"	AK Ausserkontrolle and Bonez MC		Pop	Fynn Kliemann	
12 June	"Boot"	Apache 207		Das Album	Thomas Anders and Florian Silbereisen	
19 June	"Emotions"	Ufo361		Das Album	Thomas Anders and Florian Silbereisen	
26 June	"Big Body Benz"	Bonez MC		Rough and Rowdy Ways	Bob Dylan	
3 July	"Living in a Ghost Town"	The Rolling Stones		Spirits in the Forest	Depeche Mode	
10 July	"Bläulich"	Apache 207		Sing meinen Song – Das Tauschkonzert, Vol. 7	Various artists	
17 July	"Bläulich"	Apache 207		Tausend Träume	Die Amigos	
24 July	"Bläulich"	Apache 207		Pop	Fynn Kliemann	
31 July	"Unterwegs"	Apache 207		10.000 bunte Luftballons	Fantasy	
7 August	"Sie ruft"	Apache 207		Treppenhaus	Apache 207	
14 August	"Savage Love (Laxed – Siren Beat)"	Jawsh 685 and Jason Derulo		Whoosh!	Deep Purple	
21 August	"Savage Love (Laxed – Siren Beat)"	Jawsh 685 and Jason Derulo		Pop	Fynn Kliemann	
28 August	"Frühstück in Paris"	Capital Bra and Cro		A.S.S.N. 2	AK Ausserkontrolle	
4 September	"Unterwegs"	KitschKrieg featuring Jamule		S&M2	Metallica and San Francisco Symphony	
11 September	"Fuckst mich nur ab"	Bonez MC		S&M2	Metallica and San Francisco Symphony	
18 September	"Mood"	24kGoldn featuring Iann Dior		Hollywood	Bonez MC	
25 September	"Mood"	24kGoldn featuring Iann Dior		CB7	Capital Bra	
2 October	"Mood"	24kGoldn featuring Iann Dior		Vollmond	Kontra K	
9 October	"Rohdiamant II"	Samra		Nur für dich	Ufo361 and Sonus030	
16 October	"True Romance"	Die Ärzte		Für immer frei	Saltatio Mortis	
23 October	"Mood"	24kGoldn featuring Iann Dior		Colors	Christopher von Deylen	
30 October	"Angeklagt"	Bonez MC		Hell	Die Ärzte	
6 November	"Angeklagt"	Bonez MC		Hollywood Uncut	Bonez MC	
13 November	"Angeklagt"	Bonez MC		Hell	Die Ärzte	
20 November	"Kennst du das ?!"	Samra		Power Up †	AC/DC	
27 November	"Mood"	24kGoldn featuring Iann Dior		Power Up †	AC/DC	
4 December	"All I Want for Christmas Is You"	Mariah Carey		Power Up †	AC/DC	
11 December	"All I Want for Christmas Is You"	Mariah Carey		Power Up †	AC/DC	
18 December	"All I Want for Christmas Is You"	Mariah Carey		Die Helene Fischer Show - Meine schönsten Momente Vol. 1	Helene Fischer	
25 December	"All I Want for Christmas Is You"	Mariah Carey		McCartney III	Paul McCartney	

== See also ==
- List of number-one hits (Germany)
- List of German airplay number-one songs
