= Map of the Soul: 7 =

2020 studio album by BTS

- Digital and version 4 cover. The artwork for versions 1–3 is the same, but the color of the "7" varies.

Studio album by BTS
- Released: February 21, 2020
- Recorded: 2019–2020
- Studios: Adorable Trap; Analog Lab; Big Hit Studio; Dogg Bounce; Echo Bar Studio (North Hollywood, California); Mr. Sandwich Studios; RKive; Studio Bambi Gang; The One With the Big Bulb; The Rock Pit
- Genres: Pop; R&B; hip hop; rap rock; trap; EDM
- Length: 74:52
- Languages: Korean; English
- Labels: Big Hit; Dreamus
- Producers: Pdogg; Hiss Noise; Arcades; Fred Gibson; Bad Milk; Marcus McCoan; Suga; El Capitxn; Ghstloop; Tom Wiklund; Sleep Deez; Bram Inscore; Supreme Boi; Jimin; Slow Rabbit; Audien

BTS chronology
BTS World: Original Soundtrack (2019)	Map of the Soul: 7 (2020)	Map of the Soul: 7 – The Journey (2020)

Singles from Map of the Soul: 7
- 1. "Black Swan" Released: January 17, 2020; 2. "On" Released: February 21, 2020

Map of the Soul: 7 is the fourth Korean-language and seventh overall studio album by the South Korean boy band BTS. The album was released on February 21, 2020, by Big Hit Entertainment. It is the follow-up to their 2019 extended play Map of the Soul: Persona, with five of its songs appearing on the album. Described by BTS as "deeply personal", the album is influenced by their journey and growth of seven years since their debut. Map of the Soul: 7 has been described as a pop, R&B, and hip-hop record that contains influences from urban contemporary genres like rock, trap, and EDM. Lyrically, it touches upon themes of reflection, introspection, and self-acceptance.

For the album, BTS worked with Halsey on "Boy with Luv", Ed Sheeran co-wrote "Make it Right", Troye Sivan co-wrote "Louder Than Bombs", and Sia was featured on their track "On". The record was primarily produced by Pdogg, also in the producing credits were Suga, Jimin, Fred Gibson, Hiss Noise, El Capitxn, Supreme Boi, and Arcades, among others. Upon release, Map of the Soul: 7 received critical acclaim, with praise towards the record's reflective narrative and cohesive production that experiments with various styles.

Map of the Soul: 7 was a huge commercial success, reaching number one in over 20 countries and becoming the world's best-selling album of 2020. BTS became the first Asian group to top the charts in all of the top-five music markets in the world. In the United States, it became BTS' fourth consecutive album to debut at number one album on the Billboard 200 chart, earning 422,000 album-equivalent units (including 347,000 sales) in its first week. In under nine days of its release, the album sold more than 4.1 million copies for the first time in Gaon Album Chart's history, setting the Guinness World Record for the best-selling album in South Korea and was certified quadruple million by the Korea Music Content Association (KMCA). It was certified platinum in the United States and Japan, and earned gold certifications in seven other countries.

The album was supported by two singles, both entering the US Billboard Hot 100: "Black Swan" debuted and peaked at number 57, while "On" reached number 4, becoming the band's first top-five hit on the chart. Map of the Soul: 7 won Album of the Year at the 2020 Genie Music Awards, 2020 Mnet Asian Music Awards, 2020 Melon Music Awards, and the 46th People's Choice Awards, while "On" won Best Pop, Best Choreography, and Best K-pop at the 2020 MTV Video Music Awards. The band promoted the album with televised live performances on The Late Late Show with James Corden and The Tonight Show Starring Jimmy Fallon, and various South Korean music programs including M Countdown, Music Bank, and Inkigayo. The group planned a world tour, the Map of the Soul Tour, to promote the album, but it was delayed and ultimately cancelled due to the COVID-19 pandemic.

== Background ==
"Many things were not intended as far as our career. We didn't know we would ever reach this kind of position. [...] One day, we woke up and we were like, 'Where are we?' When you don't know where to go, I think the best way is to walk down the road you have been walking on. So, the reboot [songs] is the best way to reflect ourselves and figure out ourselves again: Where are we? What are we doing? Who were we in the past? And [who are we] right now? That's how it happened."

— RM on what inspired Map of the Soul: 7, Variety

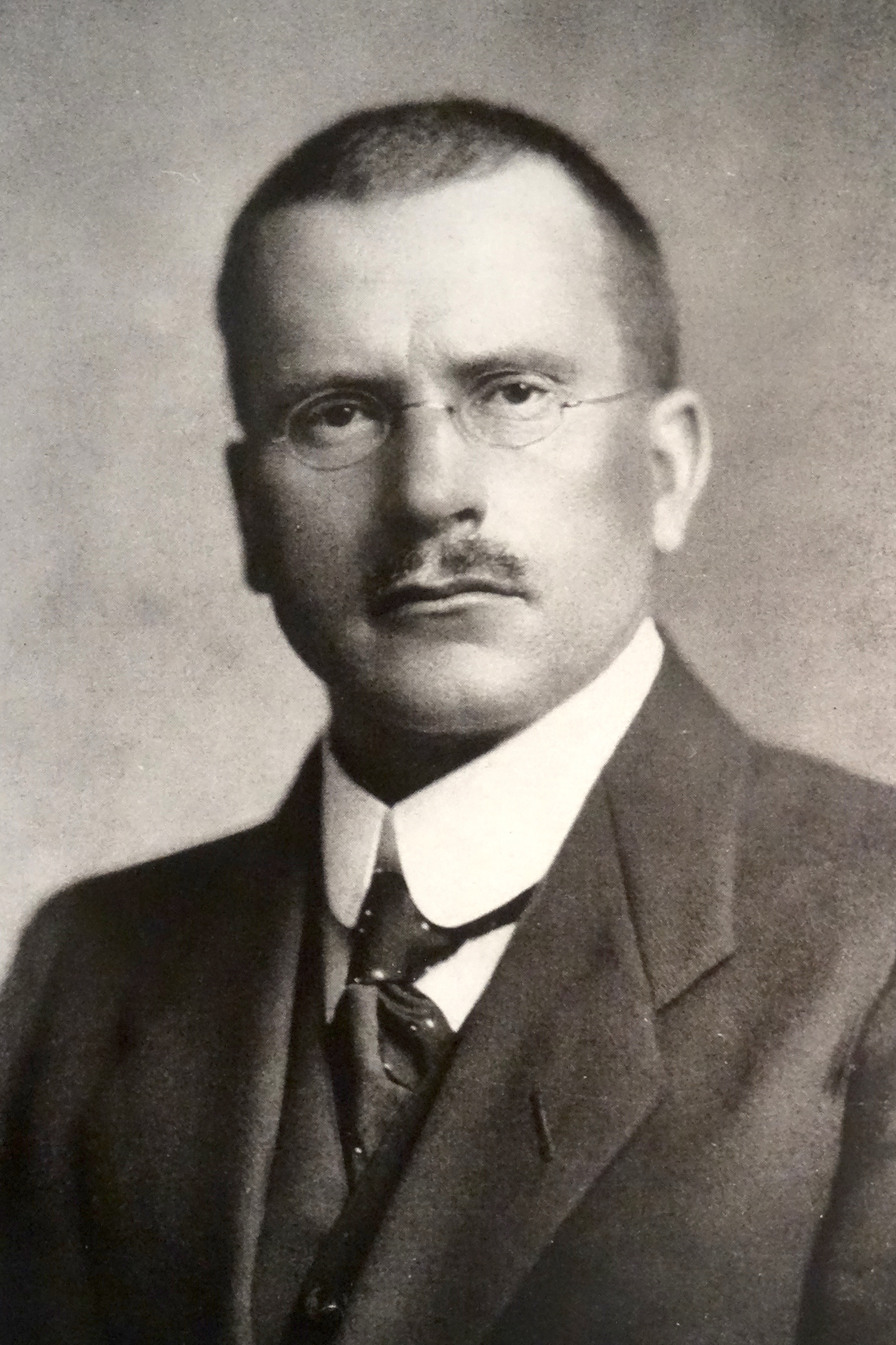
Map of the Soul: 7 is thematically based on the analytic psychological theories of Carl Jung (pictured) – persona, shadow and ego

Following the release of their sixth extended play Map of the Soul: Persona (2019), BTS took an "extended period of rest and relaxation" in the midst of their Love Yourself World Tour to "recharge and prepare to present themselves anew as musicians and creators" and to "enjoy the lives of young people in their 20s". Prior to Map of the Soul: 7's official announcement, music journalists and fans speculated that Map of the Soul would be a trilogy, and upcoming albums would be titled following the themes of Jungian psychology—Persona, Shadow and Ego. RM later confirmed that the record was originally intended to be part of a trilogy until the group changed plans and went on an extended break. He commented, "We thought, 'Why don't we combine them into one album?' Shadow means our wounds and Ego is about accepting our fate. So 7 is a very appropriate title since we've come back after seven months." Prior to the album's release, Map of the Soul: 7 was listed as one of the most anticipated albums of 2020 by Billboard, Rolling Stone, Vogue, Vulture and numerous others.

== Music and lyrics ==
Map of the Soul: 7 is a continuation of their previous EP Map of the Soul: Persona, which itself was based on Murray Stein's Jung's Map of the Soul. The album expands on the themes and concepts of human psychology – "persona", "shadow" and "ego" and traces back the band's journey and growth of 7 years since their debut. Consisting of twenty tracks with fifteen new tracks and five from their previous release, the record is their longest studio album to date. Talking about the creative process behind the album, Suga stated, "It took us a little longer, and this is our first full album in quite a while. But making an album isn't just making the music. We have the songs, there's the choreography and a lot of other elements that come with it, so it took some time." Described by BTS as "deeply personal", Map of the Soul: 7 is self-referential that sees the group looking deeper to share their individual stories through their music.

Map of the Soul: 7 has been described as a pop, R&B, and hip-hop album that incorporates rock, trap and EDM influences in its beats and production. It explores a broad range of other musical styles and genres including emo rap, rap-rock, pop-rock, Latin pop, pop-rap, electropop, disco-funk, synth-pop, and Afro pop. Instrumentation through the record is provided by guitar strings and drums. Sonically, the concept album is diverse with rap songs, slow-paced sentimental ballads, and prog-style music. Lyrically, the album touches upon themes of reflection, introspection and the band's path to self acceptance. In an interview with Zach Sang, Suga explained: "One message that penetrates the album as a whole is that you must face your inner shadow, but resist becoming submerged into its depths."

When it comes to this album, it's called [Map of the Soul:] 7. We worked together for seven years, there's seven of us. It's a lot more than just inspiration, this album contains our stories.

— Suga on the album's title, Variety

=== Songs ===
Map of the Soul: 7 opens with the solo track "Intro: Persona", a hip hop and trap song, performed by RM. It samples "Intro: Skool Luv Affair" from the band's 2014 EP Skool Luv Affair and employs guitars, "scratchy riffs" and AutoTune in its production. The track uses an echoing backdrop to create a retro sound similar to the works of American group Beastie Boys. RM raps the verses aggressively over Warped Tour-esque rock guitars, "pitched choruses" and Game Boy samples. Lyrically, the song directly references to Jung's archetypes and sees RM trying to answer the question, "Who am I?" AllMusic said that the song "delve[s] into the struggle between the darkness within and a manicured outer image." The following track, "Boy With Luv" is a playful and fun bubblegum-pop, nu-disco and electropop song, with disco, EDM, funk, synths and '80s pop elements. It features vocals from American singer Halsey, who performs mainly on the song's chorus and hook. Serving as a parallel track to the band's 2014 song "Boy In Luv", the lyrics are about finding happiness and joy in the smallest things in life.

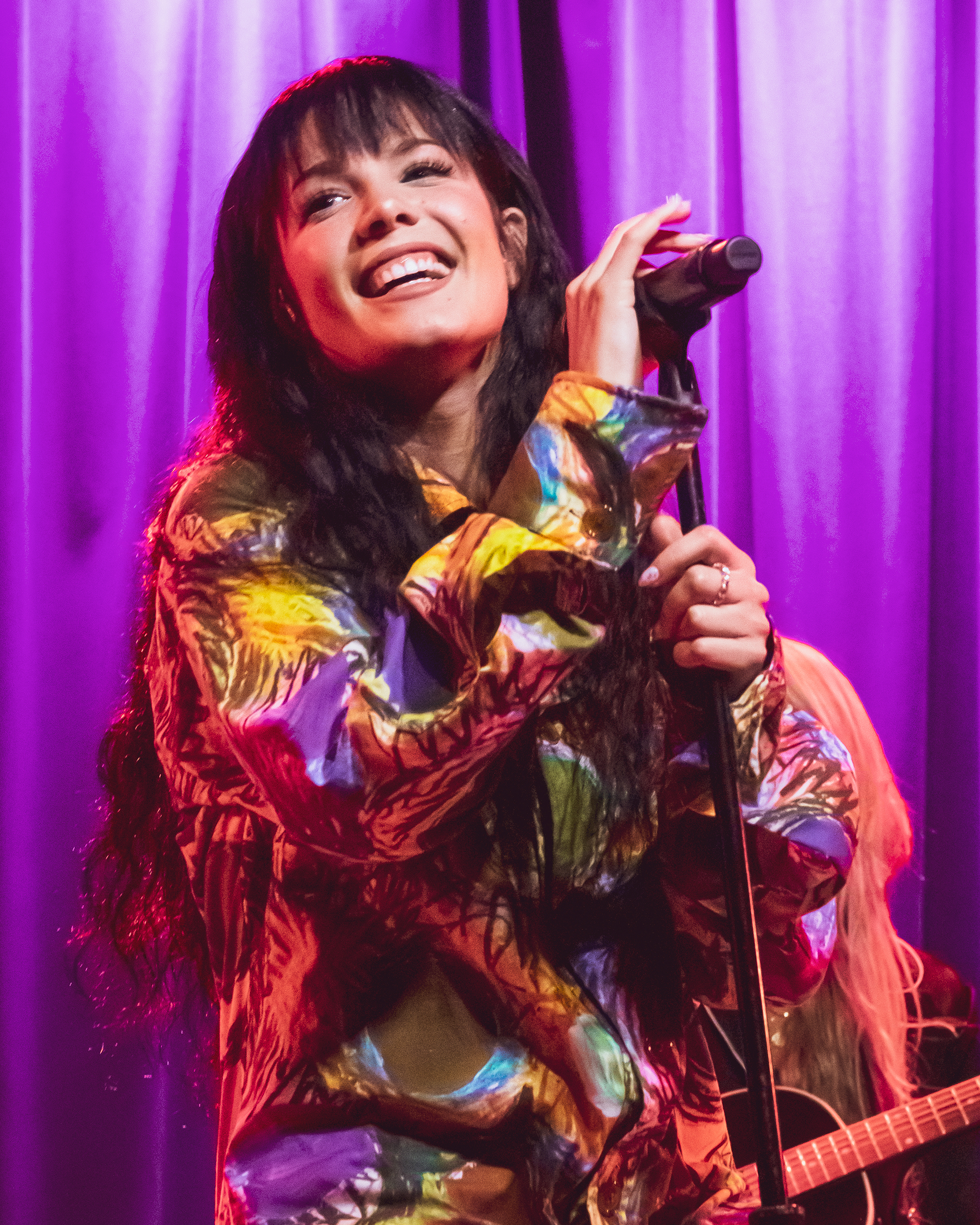
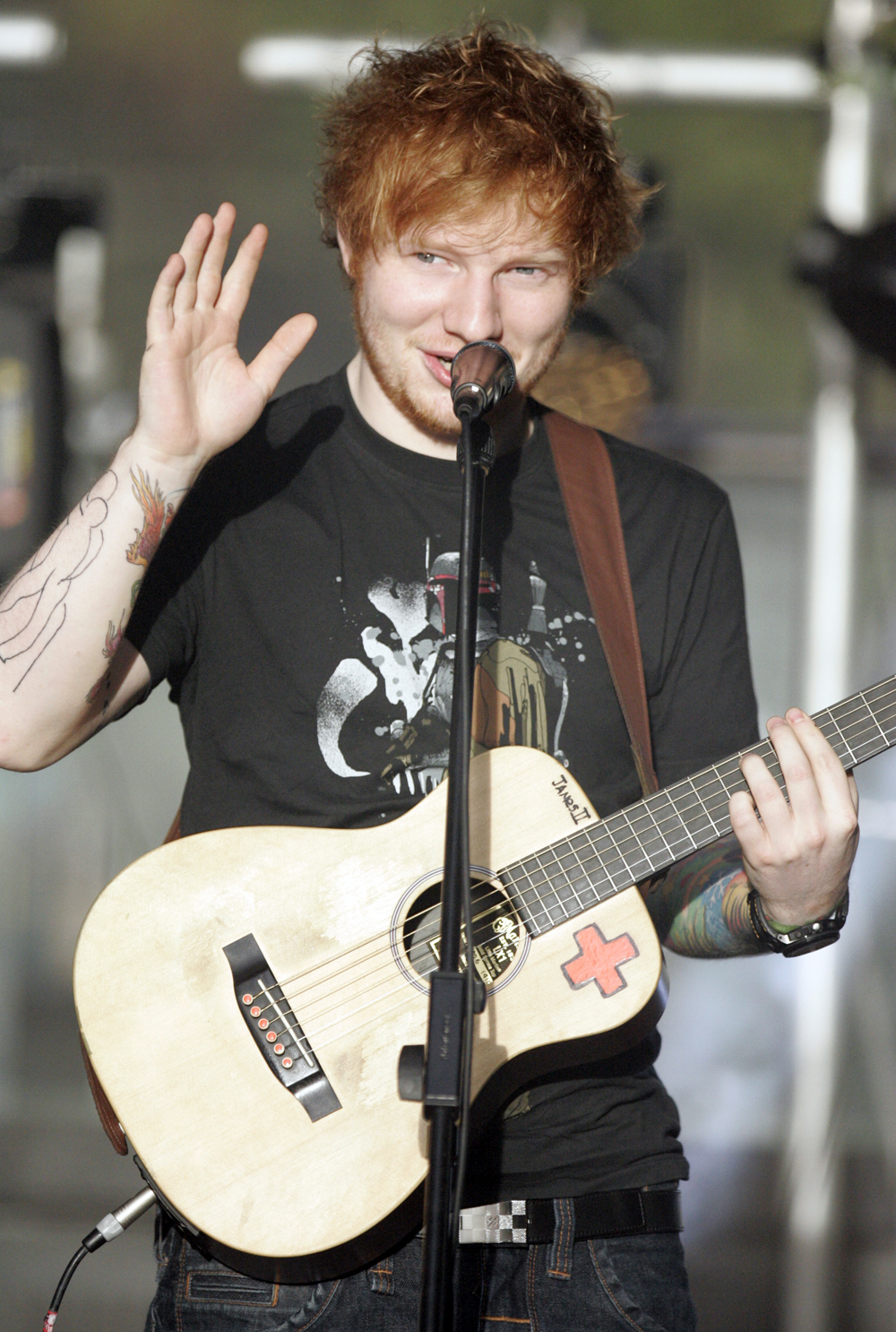
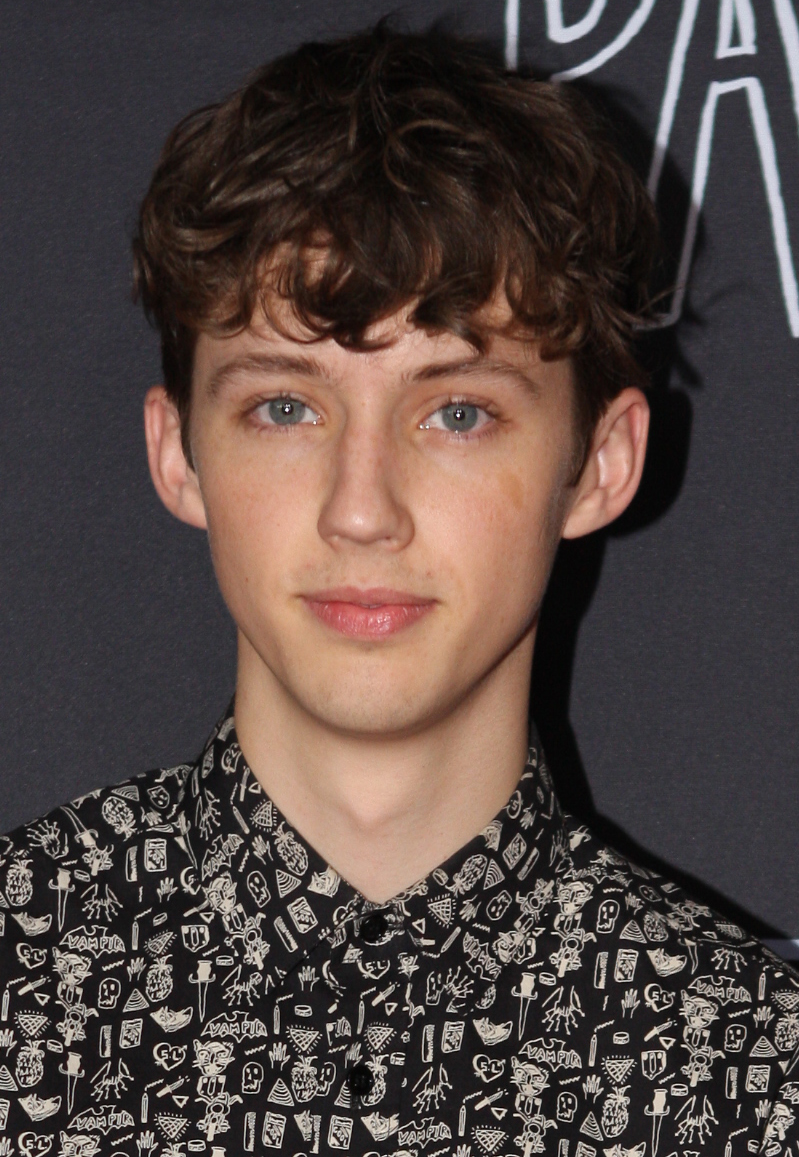
"Boy With Luv" features vocals and writing credits from Halsey (pictured left), "Make It Right" is co-written by Ed Sheeran (pictured middle) while Troye Sivan (pictured right) co-wrote "Louder than Bombs".

R&B track, "Make It Right" is co-written by British singer Ed Sheeran. Driven by synthesizers, the band makes use of falsetto-heavy vocals and belting, singing the verses "with a breathy, close-miked intensity." The production further includes a looped horn throughout the song that was compared to the '00s sound of Amerie's "1 Thing" and Mario's "Let Me Love You". The New York Times noted the song "has some of [Sheeran's] signature soft-soul gestures, but BTS renders them with complexity." The fourth track, "Jamais Vu" is the first sub-unit song on the album performed by band members Jungkook, J-Hope and Jin. A ballad, "Jamais Vu" lyrically talks about the emotion when something familiar feels weirdly foreign. Described by RM as "the joy and pain of creating something", the fifth track "Dionysus" derives its name from the eponymous Greek god of debauchery and excess. A rap rock, synth-pop and hip hop song, "Dionysus" includes multi-part hooks, a trap breakdown and double-time drums in the ending chorus. Featuring Jin's "rocking adlibs" throughout the song, it is driven by rock instrumentals in which BTS use "metal inspired high notes", "angry rap verses" and "autotuned vocals." Lyrically, the song talks about stardom, legacy and artistic integrity by using drinking as a metaphor to the band's desire to create lasting art. Noah Yoo of Pitchfork compared the song to Kendrick Lamar's 2012 single "Swimming Pools (Drank)" which is also "a meditation on alcoholism" and described "Dionysus" as "a moment of existential introspection disguised as a party-starter." The sixth song on the album is a solo track "Interlude: Shadow" performed by Suga and samples the intro track of the band's first EP O!RUL8,2? (2013). The emo rap track starts off with a medium-paced beat in an arrangement of electric guitar. During the song's lyrics, Suga raps about the fear and insecurities that come with fame and success. Rob Sheffield of Rolling Stone called it "a prime example of BTS at top strength: a pop moment that feels both intimately personal and exuberantly universal". "Black Swan" is an emo hip hop track which uses instrumentation from trap drum beats and doleful lo-fi-style guitar tunes. It also features cloud rap and contains a catchy hook. Set in an arrangement of somber instrumentals, the lyrics confess the fear of losing passion for music. Built over a rhapsodic melody, the song features distorted vocals and traditional 12-stringed Korean instrument gayageum. It was served as the first official single for the album. NME called it "a haunting, melancholy curveball" that deviates "from an immediate, radio-friendly choice", putting "artistry ahead of mass appeal". Several critics have compared the track to the band's 2018 single, "Fake Love". "Filter" is a Latin pop-esque song performed by Jimin, featuring his different sides as a person. "My Time" performed by Jungkook is a strobing R&B song about forgoing the teenage experiences because of his career. Billboard noted the use of "gritty" guitar riffs in the song, adding a mild rock effect to it. Co-written by Troye Sivan, "Louder Than Bombs" is a trap-inflected electropop ballad. It features metronomic beat and falsetto vocal harmonies led by bass.

Louder Than Bombs
"Louder Than Bombs" is a glitchy electro-pop stomper that features emotional vocal harmonies.

The album's lead single "On" is a loud, lively hip-hop anthem that kicks off with an implosive drumroll in a marching band-style and incorporates choral harmonies and trap beats. The song's title makes reference to BTS's 2013 single "N.O.". The lyrics "Can't hold me down/ ‘Cuz you know I’m a fighter" and "bring the pain on" emphasizes the album's theme of fighting against darkness, accepting faults and moving forward. Variety describes it "an exhortation to their fans, but also homage to their own career." "UGH" is an onomatopoeic hip hop track, featuring the rappers of the band (RM, J-Hope, and Suga) expressing their anger towards malicious haters in the backdrop of "distinctly" East Asian riffs, turbulent strings, gunshot effects, and plinking synths. The song was compared to the works of Outkast and Travis Scott. "00:00 (Zero O'Clock)" is a sincere soft-pop ballad performed by the vocalists (Jin, Jungkook, V, and Jimin) and features soothing falsettos, vocal harmonies and a trap beat. Lyrically, it is about reminding everyone to stay happy no matter what they are going through and that every day is a fresh start. "Friends" is a pop-rock song with a calypso beat and is performed by Jimin and V. The track portrays their close friendship through its playful lyrics. "Inner Child" sung by V, is a sweeping, soaring track full of celestial metaphors that talks about the challenging times he faced. Jin's "Moon" is an upbeat guitar-driven pop-rock track that charts the love for their fans. "Respect" is a pop-rap track featuring RM and Suga in which they examine the meaning of the word. "We Are Bulletproof: The Eternal" is a continuation of BTS's 2013 song "We Are Bulletproof : Part 2." The pensive electro-influenced piano ballad sums up the entire journey of "Bangtan Sonyeondan" (방탄소년단): the Korean name and meaning behind the band. The album closes with J-Hope's solo "Outro: Ego", featuring samples from their 2013 debut album 2 Cool 4 Skool. The song uses an afrobeat sound in its production. The lyrics see him reflecting on his career and the decisions and hardships he faced. The song ends on a note of declaration of self and ego.

== Artwork and packaging ==
Map of the Soul: 7's branding, artwork and album design centers around a layered number '7' brand mark, designed by graphic studio Sparks Edition to represent BTS's seven-year long journey. Each individual BTS member's identity and personality was embodied by a different typeface '7' within the layered brand mark. Four different designs of the brand mark were developed to accompany the concept photos of each album version.

BTS released 4 album versions for Map of the Soul: 7 containing different concept photos. Version 1 saw the group clad in white, depicting the members as swans with a "desire for perfection". In a darker theme, Version 2 portrays them as fallen angels with jet-black wings, alluding to their single "Black Swan" and represents "unquenchable thirst". Version 3 finds them seated in a luxuriant Dionysian feast, holding golden chalices, conveying a "sense of calling and will." Version 4 stands out as a stark contrast to the previous darker themes and is done up in the manner of year-book photos. It focuses on the personalities of each individual member depicting their "true selves".

== Release and promotion ==
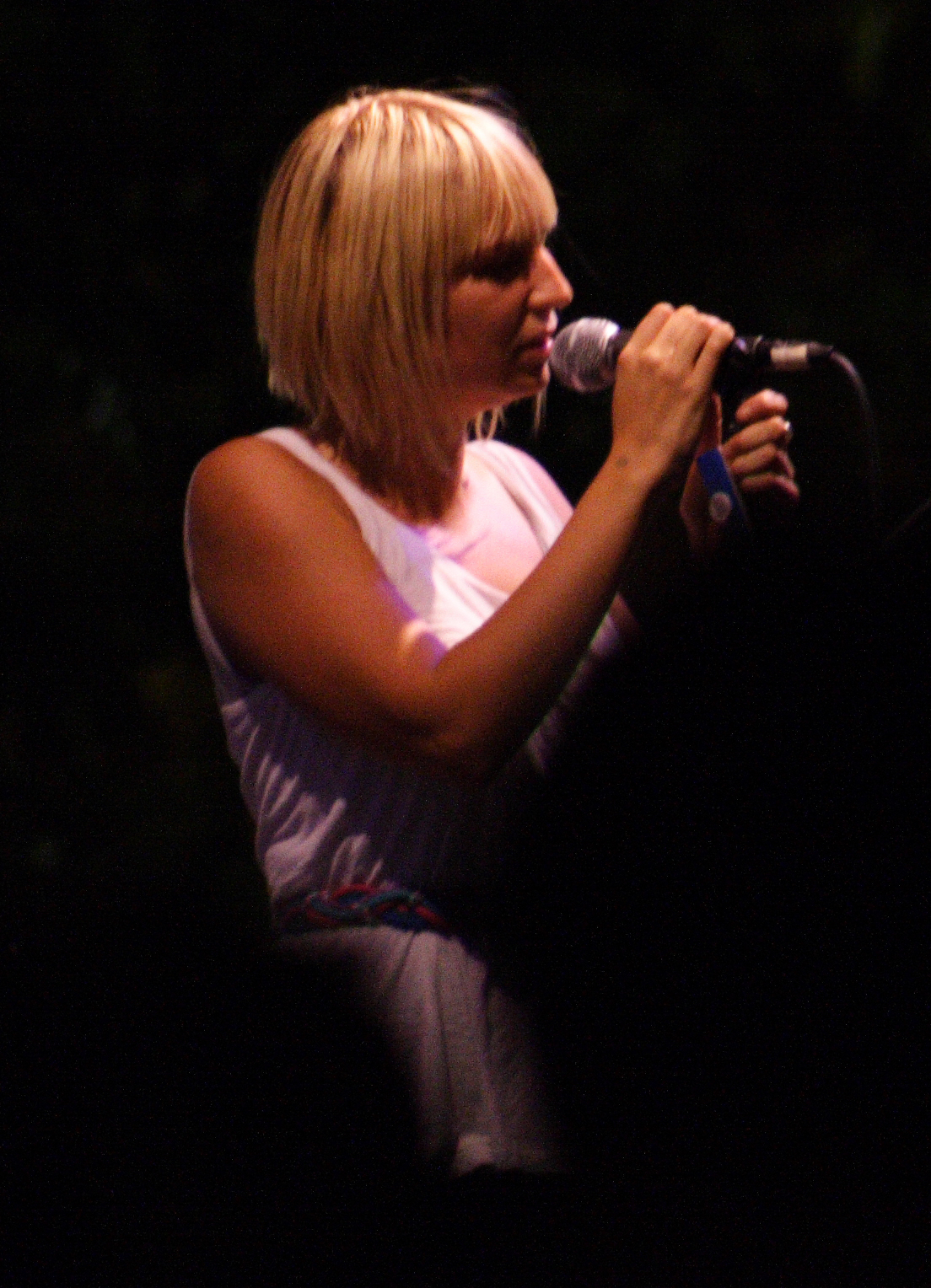
Australian musician Sia (pictured) is featured on the digital-only version of the album's lead single "On".

On January 7, 2020, the group announced that the album would be called Map of the Soul: 7, with pre-orders starting on January 9. A "comeback map" for the album was released on January 8 revealing a schedule split into four phases. The map included multiple dates, including the release dates for the album's two lead singles. On January 9, the group released the official "comeback trailer" for their album, titled "Interlude: Shadow", performed by member Suga. The band released a second comeback trailer featuring J-Hope's song "Outro: Ego" on February 2. From February 9 through February 12, the band released a collection of four different series of concept photos, "offering fans new insights into what to expect from the album", according to Paper's Matt Moen. On February 17, the group revealed the tracklist, consisting of twenty tracks, of which the first five were from Map of the Soul: Persona. The album also included an alternative version of the lead single "On" in collaboration with Australian singer Sia, as the twentieth track of the digital-only release. On February 20, the day before the album was released, BigHit released details about the songs. On February 21, a 30-second clip of the lead single "On" was released on TikTok, 12 hours ahead of the official release of the song. TikTok reportedly crashed momentarily due to a large number of fans trying to access it and also inspired a dance challenge. The same day BTS held a "Comeback Special" on VLIVE broadcasting site from New York, a few hours ahead of the album's release. In South Korea, BTS held a global press conference in Seoul, on February 24, 2020, to promote the album. In October 2021, it was announced that the upcoming Marvel Studios film Eternals would feature the song "Friends".

=== Singles ===
"Black Swan", announced as the album's first single, was released on January 17, 2020 and debuted at number 57 on the US Billboard Hot 100 and number 46 on the UK Official Singles Chart. The single additionally peaked at number seven on the Gaon Digital Chart and number two on the US Digital Song Sales chart. It was supported by two music videos. The first music video was in the form of an "art film" featuring an interpretive dance performance by Slovenian modern dance troupe MN Dance Company released on YouTube on January 17, 2020. A second official music video of BTS performing in an opulent theater was later released on YouTube on March 4, 2020, without any prior announcement. The group performed the song for the first time on The Late Late Show with James Corden on January 28.

Ten months after release of Map of the Soul: Persona (2019), Map of the Soul: 7 was released worldwide on February 21, 2020, by Big Hit Entertainment in conjunction with a dance-oriented music video titled "Kinetic Manifesto Film: Come Prima" for the lead single "On". The video amassed 46.5 million videos within its first day of release, making it the fifth most-watched YouTube video in 24 hours. A second cinematic official music video for "On" was released on February 27. With 1.54 million concurrent viewers within minutes of its release, the video broke the record for the biggest YouTube premier of all time and became the fastest Korean video on YouTube to reach 10 million views. The music video garnered 43.8 million views on its first day, surpassing Taylor Swift's "Look What You Made Me Do", making it the seventh most-viewed video on YouTube in the first 24 hours. Commercially, "On" debuted at number 4 on the Billboard Hot 100 with 86,000 downloads and 18.3 million U.S. streams, marking BTS's biggest sales week for a song. The song is the group's highest-charting single on the chart and their first top 5, following "Boy With Luv" featuring Halsey which peaked at number 8 and "Fake Love" which peaked at No. 10, making BTS the first Korean artist to have most Top Ten hits on the Hot 100. It also debuted atop Billboard Digital Songs Sales chart and the Gaon Digital Chart. The song won Best Pop, Best K-pop and Best Choreography at the 2020 MTV Video Music Awards. The music video was also successful, receiving a nomination for Best Pop Video - International at the 2020 UK Music Video Awards.

=== Performances ===
Following the album release, the band performed "On" for the first time at the main concourse of Grand Central Station on The Tonight Show Starring Jimmy Fallon, for what has been called "one of the most high-production episodes" of the show. BTS also appeared on The Late Late Show With James Corden, NBC Today Show, MTV Fresh Out and The Tonight Show Starring Jimmy Fallon. For the next two weeks, BTS made several appearances on South Korean music programs, including KBS Music Bank, Mnet's M Countdown and SBS Inkigayo to perform the singles "Black Swan" and "On".

=== Connect, BTS ===
In January 2020, BTS and Big Hit Entertainment launched "Connect, BTS", ahead of the release of Map of the Soul: 7. "Connect, BTS" is a global public art project involving 22 contemporary artists across five cities: London, Berlin, Buenos Aires, Seoul and New York. Galleries in these cities hosted artistic events throughout January until the end of March. According to the "Connect, BTS" website, the project was developed by international curators who "resonated with BTS' philosophy" and "aims to redefine the relationships between art and music, the material and immaterial, artists and their audiences, artists and artists, theory and practice." The project kicked off on January 14 at London's Serpentine Galleries with the launch of "Catharsis", a digital recreation of an ancient forest by Danish artist Jakob Kudsk Steensen. Other works include a "drawing in space" on New York's Brooklyn Bridge by British sculptor Antony Gormley using 11 kilometres of aluminium tubing. In Argentina, local contemporary artist Tomás Saraceno launched his environmentally-conscious "Aerocene Pacha" project that successfully flew a human above the Salinas Grandes into the sky using a solar-powered hot air balloon; it set several new world records for propane-free flight. In Seoul, the Dongdaemun Design Plaza featured installations by British artist Ann Veronica Janssens and Korean artist Yiyun Kang which were a "re-imagining of BTS' signature dance movements", while a performance art program called "Rituals of Care" with 17 artists was hosted in Berlin's Martin-Gropius-Bau.

=== Planned world tour ===
On January 21, 2020, BTS officially announced their fourth worldwide concert tour and second stadium tour titled Map of the Soul Tour to promote Map of the Soul: Persona and Map of the Soul: 7. The tour was set to begin on April 11, 2020, at the Jamsil Olympic Stadium in the South Korea but after initial tour dates in Seoul were cancelled due to the COVID-19 pandemic, the group's label postponed all additional dates. A two-day virtual pay-per-view concert titled BTS Map of the Soul ON:E was held on October 10–11, 2020, drawing 993,000 concurrent viewers. The tour was ultimately cancelled in August 2021 due to the impact of the pandemic.

== Critical reception ==
Professional ratings
Aggregate scores
Source	Rating
AnyDecentMusic?	7.6/10
Metacritic	82/100
Review scores
Source	Rating
AllMusic	4/5 stars
Clash	8/10
Consequence of Sound	B+
Evening Standard	3/5 stars
Exclaim!	8/10
The Independent	4/5 stars
The Line of Best Fit	10/10
NME	4/5 stars
Pitchfork	6.3/10
Rolling Stone	4/5 stars

Map of the Soul: 7 was acclaimed by critics. According to the review aggregator Metacritic, Map of the Soul: 7 received "universal acclaim" based on a weighted average score of 82 out of 100 from 12 critic scores. Aggregator AnyDecentMusic? gave it a 7.6 out of 10, based on their assessment of the critical consensus.

Rob Sheffield from Rolling Stone called Map of the Soul: 7 BTS's "most smashing album yet, showing off their mastery of different pop styles", praising the broad and diverse sounds that flow cohesively through the album. Writing for Clash, Deb Aderinkomi also praised the album's sonic diversity, stating "Although the sound of the album is wide-ranging, it holds continuity through its lyrics and general sentiment." Sophia Simon-Bashall of The Line of Best Fit described the album as "an impressive, exciting and moving album with slick production" and concluded positively that the album is "a love letter to pain, to the shadows that live within us.[...]It’s a reminder that where there is dark, there is light, and it always possible to find it." AllMusic's Neil Z.Yeung praised the album's concept and production, writing "they transform contemporary trends from the worlds of hip-hop, pop, and dance into a fittingly unique BTS experience." August Brown of the Los Angeles Times wrote that the album is "about being in a band, about the relationships that form and get tested in the crucible of insane fame" along with "the darkest, strangest and yet most relevant and ambitious music BTS has made yet." He commented that the record references to "their roots as a hip-hop act,[...] but attuned to today's misty, hard-kicking sonics and bolstered by everything they've learned in the intervening years as pop stars".

Writing for NME, Rhian Daly deemed Map of the Soul: 7 "as an album full of big ideas, strong conviction and unguarded emotion." Reviewing for The Independent, Roisin O’Connor called the album "a gorgeous tapestry" where "recurring themes speak to a duality in which they weave myriad emotions". Stereogum's Chris DeVille compared Map of the Soul: 7 to the Beatles's White Album writing,"7 is something like BTS’ very own White Album, a collection held together less by a cohesive sound than a familiar convergence of personalities." Corey van den Hoogenband of Exclaim! described it as an album "literally written for—and to—the members and fans" in which "the group made a conscious decision to experiment and give more of themselves [...] focus[ing] on exactly what makes BTS special: its members." Billboard's Tamar Herman summarized the album as "a bright sonic soundscape; a celebration of everything that BTS has become". Jochan Embley of Evening Standard wrote that the album is "an impeccably polished collection, written well and performed admirably." In The New York Times, music critic Jon Caramanica opined that "7 captures a group sure of its place in the pop hierarchy and beginning to itch about what to do next — unsurprising, given that BTS is reaching the point of self-awareness that all superstars eventually reach, but can often be hidden in the hyperstylized world of K-pop." In a review published by Uproxx, Derrick Rossignol wrote: "Map of the Soul: 7 is a reflective album lyrically, and an adventurous one instrumentally, as the group brings disparate influences under their glossy pop umbrella." Chester Chin, in her review for The Star, found the record sonically darker and felt that the band had reached the juncture on the album in their musical career "when the pursuit of artistry far outweighs those of commercial sensibilities." Do-heon Kim from IZM considered the record "as a narrative that summarizes and epitomises the history of the K-pop boy band while also delving deeper on a personal level that retraces the past of BTS."

== Accolades ==
Awards and nominations for Map of the Soul: 7
Year	Ceremony	Category	Result	Ref.
2020	Asian Pop Music Awards	Album of the Year(Overseas)	Nominated	
2020	Genie Music Awards	Album of the Year	Won	
2020	Melon Music Awards	Album of the Year	Won	
2020	Mnet Asian Music Awards	Album of the Year	Won	
2020	People's Choice Awards	The Album of 2020	Won	
2020	IFPI Awards	Global Album All Format Album Award	Won	
2020	IFPI Awards	Global Album Sales Award	Won	
2020	RTHK International Pop Poll Awards	The Best Selling Korean Album	Won	
2020	Guinness World Records	Best-selling album in South Korea	Won	
2021	Gaffa-Prisen	Best International Album	Won	
2021	Gaon Chart Music Awards	Album of the Year – 1st Quarter	Won	
2021	Gaon Chart Music Awards	Retail Album of the Year	Won	
2021	Golden Disc Awards	Album Daesang	Won	
2021	Golden Disc Awards	Album Bonsang	Won	
2021	Japan Gold Disc Awards	Best 3 Albums (Asia)	Won	
2021	Korean Music Awards	Album of the Year	Nominated	
2021	Korean Music Awards	Best Pop Album	Nominated	
2021	Seoul Music Awards	Best Album	Won	
2021	Seoul Music Awards	Bonsang Award	Won	

Accolades for Map of the Soul: 7
Publication	List	Rank	Ref.
The Atlantic	The 16 Best Albums of 2020	—N/a	
Billboard	Top 50 Best Albums of 2020	33	
Cleveland	The Best Albums of 2020	28	
Consequence of Sound	Top 50 Albums of 2020	12	
NME	The 50 best albums of 2020	44	
PopCrush	25 Best Albums of 2020	—N/a	
PopSugar	50 of the Best Albums to Drop in 2020	28	
Rolling Stone	The 50 Best Albums of 2020	16	
Rolling Stone	The 50 Greatest Concept Albums of All Time	25	
Rolling Stone India	10 Best K-pop Albums of 2020	1	
StyleCaster	The Best Albums of 2020	—N/a	
SCMP	15 Best K-Pop Albums of 2020	1	
Time	The Best K-Pop Albums Of 2020	—N/a	
Uproxx	The Best Pop Albums Of 2020	16	

== Commercial performance ==
According to Dreamus, the distributor for Map of the Soul: 7, stock preorders for the album surpassed 3.42 million copies over the first six days of the pre-order period, overtaking the group's own record set with Map of the Soul: Persona's 2.68 million pre-orders. On February 6, Forbes reported that the album had surpassed 4 million pre-orders worldwide. By February 18, album pre-orders had crossed 4.02 million.

=== North America ===
Map of the Soul: 7 debuted atop the US Billboard 200 with 422,000 album-equivalent units, including 347,000 pure album sales, becoming BTS's fourth number-one album in the country and the highest first-week figures of BTS's albums in the US to date. It also marked the biggest first week sales for an album in 2020 and maintained the record until The Weeknd's After Hours was released on March 20. The album outsold the next six highest-ranking albums on the Billboard 200 combined. The album's lead single, "On" debuted at number four on the Billboard Hot 100 with 86,000 downloads and 18.3 million U.S. streams, marking BTS' biggest sales week for a song at the time. The song was the group's highest-charting single on the chart at that time and their first top five, following "Boy With Luv" featuring Halsey which peaked at number eight and "Fake Love" which peaked at No. 10, making BTS the Korean artist with the most top-ten hits on the Hot 100. In November 2020, Map of the Soul: 7 was certified platinum by the Recording Industry Association of America (RIAA), which denotes one million album-equivalent units. It is their second album to be awarded platinum following Love Yourself: Answer (2018). In Canada, the album debuted at number one with 23,000 album-equivalent units, becoming the group's third chart-topping album following Love Yourself: Answer and Map of the Soul: Persona. At the end of 2020, Billboard revealed that Map of the Soul: 7 ranked at number two on the list of the ten top-selling albums of the year in the US, according to MRC Data, with 674,009 copies sold, only behind Taylor Swift's Folklore, which sold over 1 million copies. Map of the Soul: 7 was also the number one physical album of the year in America, with 646,000 hard copies sold. In February 2021, Map of the Soul: 7 became the first BTS album to spend its entire first year on the US Billboard 200—it charted for 52 consecutive weeks—and the second longest charting Asian album after Love Yourself: Answer (2018). As of September 2021, the album has remained on the chart for 82 consecutive weeks.

=== Asia ===
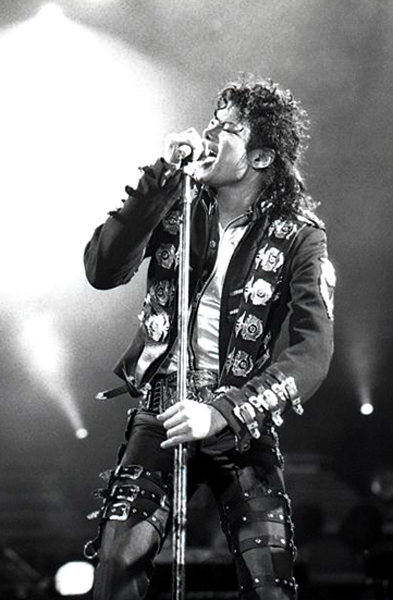
BTS became the first foreign artist in 36 years to top Japan's mid-year Oricon Albums Chart ranking with Map of the Soul: 7, since Michael Jackson (pictured) with Thriller (1984).

In South Korea, the album debuted atop the Gaon Album Chart, giving BTS their thirteenth number one. The album sold over 2.65 million copies in its first six hours and a record-breaking 3.37 million copies in its first week, achieving the highest first week sales in Hanteo Chart history and surpassing their previous record of 2.13 million copies with Map of the Soul: Persona; it outsold the next nineteen best-selling albums of 2020 combined. In under nine days of the album's release, Map of the Soul: 7 sold 4.1 million copies, marking the highest sales achieved by an album in a month and over a single year in the Gaon Album Chart's history, surpassing the monthly and annual sales of Map of the Soul: Persona and making it the best-selling album in the history of South Korea. It is also the first Korean album to sell more than 4 million copies since Gaon Chart's inception. In April, it became the first album certified as "Quadruple Million" by Gaon since the body implemented certifications in 2018; BTS are the only artist to achieve this. Following the release of Map of the Soul: 7, BTS became the best-selling artist in South Korea of all time, having sold 20.32 million albums cumulatively. It topped Gaon's annual album chart with a cumulative 4,376,975 copies sold, marking the fifth consecutive year that BTS had the best-selling album in their home country. In Japan, the album became the group's fifth number one, selling more than 370,000 copies in its release week. It was certified Platinum by Recording Industry Association of Japan (RIAJ) in February 2020, denoting 250,000 shipments. Four months later, in June, Oricon announced that Map of the Soul: 7 had topped the mid-year Album Chart ranking with 429,000 copies sold, making BTS the first foreign artist in 36 years to do so since Michael Jackson with Thriller (1984), and the first male artist in three years since SMAP in 2017 with their greatest hits album SMAP 25 Years.

=== Europe ===
In the United Kingdom, the album debuted atop the Official Albums Chart giving the group their second consecutive number one. It moved around 36,000 units, with 32,000 being from pure sales. The album is certified Silver by the British Phonographic Industry for selling over 60,000 copies in the country. The album debuted atop the German albums chart, making BTS the first Asian group to top the chart. It debuted at number one on the Irish Albums Chart, making BTS the Korean artist to score a number one in that country. The album debuted at number one on Australia's ARIA Albums Chart becoming BTS' fifth top ten entry, and their second consecutive number one following Map of the Soul: Persona. In France, the album debuted at number one on the SNEP Albums Chart, moving 23,502 equivalent units, making the group's first number one in that country.

=== Worldwide ===
With Map of the Soul: 7, BTS became the first Asian group to top the album charts in the top five music markets in the world—the United States, the United Kingdom, Japan, Germany, and France. The International Federation of the Phonographic Industry (IFPI) named Map of the Soul: 7 the best-selling album of 2020 globally, both in pure sales and across all consumption formats, spanning physical sales, digital downloads, and streaming platforms. The album received the IFPI's first ever Global Album All Format Chart Award. BTS was also the only act with multiple albums in both charts.

== Track listing ==
Credits are adapted from the liner notes of Map of the Soul: 7.

Map of the Soul: 7 track listing
No.	Title	Writer(s)	Producer(s)	Length
1.	"Intro: Persona" (performed by RM)	Hiss Noise; RM; Pdogg	Hiss Noise	2:54
2.	"Boy with Luv" (작은 것들을 위한 시; Jageun geotdeureul wihan si [lit. "A Poem for Small Things"]; featuring Halsey)	Pdogg; RM; Melanie Joy Fontana; Michel "Lindgren" Schulz; "Hitman" Bang; Suga; Emily Weisband; J-Hope; Ashley Frangipane	Pdogg	3:49
3.	"Make It Right"	Fred Gibson; Ed Sheeran; Benjy Gibson; Jo Hill; RM; Suga; J-Hope	F. Gibson	3:42
4.	"Jamais Vu" (performed by Jin, J-Hope, and Jungkook)	Marcus McCoan; Owen Roberts; Matty Thomson; Max Lynedoch Graham; Reynolds; Camilla Anne Stewart; RM; J-Hope; "Hitman" Bang	Arcades; Bad Milk; M. McCoan	3:46
5.	"Dionysus"	Pdogg; J-Hope; Supreme Boi; RM; Suga; Roman Campolo	Pdogg	4:08
6.	"Interlude: Shadow" (performed by Suga)	Suga; El Capitxn; Ghstloop; Pdogg; RM	Suga; El Capitxn; Ghstloop	4:20
7.	"Black Swan"	Pdogg; RM; August Rigo; Vince Nantes; Clyde Kelly	Pdogg	3:18
8.	"Filter" (performed by Jimin)	Tom Wiklund; Hilda Stenmalm; "Hitman" Bang; Lee Seu-ran; Lutra; danke; Bobby Jung; Ahn Bok-jin; Fallin' Dild; Neon Boy	Tom Wiklund	3:00
9.	"My Time" (시차; Sicha; performed by Jungkook)	Sleep Deez; RM; Jungkook; Jayrah Gibson; Pdogg; Printz Board; Richelle Alleyne	Sleep Deez; Pdogg	3:54
10.	"Louder Than Bombs"	Troye Sivan; Allie X; Leland; Bram Inscore; RM; Suga; J-Hope	Bram Inscore	3:37
11.	"On"	Pdogg; RM; Rigo; Michel Schulz; Suga; J-Hope; Antonina Armato; Krysta Youngs; Julia Ross	Pdogg	4:06
12.	"Ugh!" (욱; Uk; performed by RM, J-Hope, and Suga)	Supreme Boi; Suga; RM; Hiss Noise; J-Hope; Icecream Drum	Supreme Boi	3:45
13.	"00:00 (Zero O'Clock)" (performed by Jin, V, Jimin, and Jungkook)	Pdogg; RM; Jessie Lauryn Foutz; Antonina Armato	Pdogg	4:10
14.	"Inner Child" (performed by V)	Pdogg; RM; V; Ryan Lawrie; Max Graham; Matthew Thomson; Adien Lewis; Ellis Miah; James F. Reynolds	Arcades	3:53
15.	"Friends" (친구; Chingu; performed by V and Jimin)	Pdogg; Jimin; Supreme Boi; Adora; Martin Sjølie; Stella Jang	Pdogg; Jimin	3:19
16.	"Moon" (performed by Jin)	Slow Rabbit; RM; Jin; Adora; DJ Swivel; Candace Nicole Sosa; Mikael Daniel Caesar; Alex Ludwig Lindell	Slow Rabbit	3:29
17.	"Respect" (performed by RM and Suga)	Hiss Noise; Suga; RM; El Capitxn	Hiss Noise; Suga; El Capitxn	3:58
18.	"We Are Bulletproof: The Eternal"	DJ Swivel; Audien; Sunshine (Cazzi Opeia & Ellen Berg); Etta Zelmani; RM; Will Tanner; Gusten Dahlqvist; Candace Nicole Sosa; Suga; J-Hope; Elohim; Antonina Armato; July Jones; Alexander Magnus Karlsson; Alexei Viktorovitch	Audien; Henrik Michelsen	4:22
19.	"Outro: Ego" (performed by J-Hope)	J-Hope; Hiss Noise; Supreme Boi	Hiss Noise	3:16
20.	"On" (featuring Sia; digital bonus track)	Armato; Rigo; Fontana; J-Hope; Ross; Youngs; Schulz; Pdogg; RM; Suga		4:06
Total length:				75:00

== Personnel ==
Credits are adapted from the album's liner notes.

Musicians

- BTS – primary vocals
  - Jin – vocals, gang vocals (tracks 8, 14–16, 18–19)
  - Suga – rap, keyboard (track 6), gang vocals (track 18)
  - J-Hope – rap, chorus (tracks 5, 7, 19), gang vocals (tracks 5, 8, 14–15, 18–19), vocals and rap arrangement (track 19), recording engineer (track 19)
  - RM – rap, rap arrangement (tracks 1–3, 5, 10–11, 17), recording engineer (tracks 1–3, 5, 10–11, 17), chorus (track 5), gang vocals (tracks 5, 18), vocal arrangement (track 17)
  - Jimin – vocals, chorus (track 8), gang vocals (tracks 8, 14–16, 18–19)
  - V – vocals, gang vocals (tracks 8, 14–16, 18–19)
  - Jungkook – vocals, chorus (tracks 2–5, 7, 9–11, 13, 15, 18), gang vocals (tracks 8, 14–16, 18–19)
- Paul Addleman – direction assistance (track 11)
- Adora – digital editing (track 2), chorus (tracks 4, 8, 10, 13–16, 19), recording engineer (tracks 4, 8, 10, 13–16, 19)
- Arcades – production (track 4)
- Bianca Arriaga – drums (track 11)
- Del Atkins – bass (track 11)
- Emma Atkins – drums (track 11)
- Bad Milk – production (track 4)
- Chris Badroos – horn (track 11)
- Duane Benjamin – orchestra conduction (track 11, 15, 19)
- Dedrick Bonner – choir direction (tracks 11, 15, 17, 19), choir (tracks 11, 15, 17, 19)
- Haley Breland – horn (track 11)
- Tym Brown – choir (tracks 11, 15, 17, 19)
- Daniel Caesar – chorus (track 16)
- Rastine Calhoun – horn (tracks 11, 15, 19)
- Christopher Calles – horn (track 11)
- Clayton Cameron – drums (track 11)
- Cherene Cexil – choir (tracks 11, 15, 17, 19)
- Siobhan Chapman – drums (track 11)
- Matthew Chin – horn (track 11)
- Justin Cole – drums (track 11)
- Kayla Collins – choir (tracks 11, 15, 17, 19)
- Meloney Collins – choir direction assistance (tracks 11, 15, 17, 19)
- Jason de Leon – drums (track 11)
- DJ Friz – scratch (track 17)
- El Capitxn – digital editing (tracks 3, 5, 8–9, 13, 15), synthesizer (track 6)
- Matthew Espinoza – horn (track 11)
- Ken Fisher – associate direction (track 11)
- Melanie Joy Fontana – chorus (tracks 2, 11)
- James Ford – horn (tracks 11, 15, 19)
- Jessie Lauryn Foutz – chorus (track 13)
- Frants – bass (tracks 6, 14, 16, 19), recording engineer (tracks 6, 14, 16, 19), digital editing (tracks 8, 15), gang vocals (track 12), guitar (track 14)
- Kia Dawn Fulton – choir (tracks 11, 15, 17, 19)
- Ghstloop – keyboard (track 6), synthesizer (track 6), digital editing (tracks 6, 10, 13–14), gang vocals (track 12)
- Fred Gibson – production (track 3), drums (track 3), keyboard (track 3), synthesizer (track 3), programming (track 3)
- Max Lynedoch Graham – guitar (tracks 4, 14), keyboard (track 4), percussions (tracks 4, 14), vocoder (track 4), programming (tracks 4, 14), gang vocals (track 14)
- Diana Greenwood – drum (track 11)
- Summer Greer – choir (tracks 11, 15, 17, 19)
- Halsey – chorus (track 2)
- Enniss Harris – horn (track 11)
- Spencer Hart – horn (track 11)
- Hiss noise – production (track 1), keyboard (tracks 1, 4, 12, 17, 19), synthesizer (tracks 1, 17, 19), guitar (track 1), recording engineer (tracks 1, 3–4), digital editing (tracks 1, 3–5, 7–10, 13–14, 17–19), gang vocals (tracks 5, 12)
- Icecream Drum – drums programming (track 12)
- Bram Inscore – instruments (track 10)
- Alexander Magnus Karlsson – chorus (track 18)
- Wendell Kelly – horn (tracks 15, 19)
- Brenden Kersey-Wilson – horn (track 11)
- Moiro Konchellah – choir (tracks 11, 15, 17, 19)
- Sam Kredich – horn (track 11)
- Ryan Lawrie – chorus (track 14), gang vocals (track 14)
- Lee Tae-wook – guitar (tracks 1–2, 4, 16)
- Adien Lewis – gang vocals (track 14)
- Ludwig Lindell – chorus (track 16)
- Evan Mackey – horn (track 11)
- Jesus Martinez – horn (track 11)
- Chadaé McAlister – choir (tracks 11, 15, 17, 19)
- Marcus McCoan – production (track 4), keyboard (track 4), percussions (track 4), chorus (track 4), programming (track 4)
- Collin McCrary – horn (track 11)
- John McEwan – gang vocals (track 14)
- Kevin McKeown – direction (track 11)
- Ellis Miah – gang vocals (track 14)
- Henrik Michelsen – production (track 11)
- Kit Naughton – gang vocals (track 14)
- Erm Navarro – horn (tracks 15, 19)
- Nobody – bass (track 15)
- Cazzi Opeia – chorus (track 18), gang vocals (track 18)
- Marie Ortinau – gang vocals (track 14)
- Katie Osborn – horn (track 11)
- Jon Pappenbrook – horn (tracks 15, 19)
- Pdogg – production (track 2), keyboard (tracks 2, 5, 7, 9, 11, 13, 15, 17), synthesizer (tracks 2, 5–7, 9, 11, 13–15), vocal arrangement (tracks 2–11, 13–15, 17–18), rap arrangement (tracks 2–4, 6–7, 10–11, 17–18), recording engineer (tracks 2–11, 13–15, 17–18), digital editing (tracks 2, 11, 15), gang vocals (tracks 5, 12, 16), additional production (tracks 6, 10, 14)
- Marcus Perez – horn (track 11)
- Phil X – guitar (track 5), recording engineer (track 5)
- Samuel Pounds – choir (tracks 11, 15, 17, 19)
- Nathaniel Rathbun – programming (track 18), keyboard (track 18)
- James F. Reynolds – mix engineer (tracks 3, 14, 16, 18), gang vocals (track 14)
- Owen Roberts – keyboard (track 4), percussions (track 4), programming (track 4)
- Ken Sarah – drums (track 11)
- Walter Simonsen – drums (track 11)
- Martin Sjolie – chorus (track 15)
- Sleep Deez – keyboard (track 9), synthesizer (track 9)
- Jayrah Gibson - vocalists, Co-writer (track 9)
- Slow Rabbit – gang vocals (track 12), keyboard (track 16), synthesizer (track 16), vocal arrangement (track 16), recording engineer (track 16), digital editing (track 16)
- Candace Nicole Sosa – chorus (tracks 16, 18)
- Michael Stranieri – horn (track 11)
- Supreme Boi – gang vocals (tracks 5, 12), rap arrangement (tracks 5, 12), recording engineer (tracks 5, 12), digital editing (tracks 5, 12), keyboard (track 12), synthesizer (track 12), drums programming (track 12), vocal arrangement (track 12)
- Will Tanner – gang vocals (track 18)
- Matt Thomson – guitar (tracks 4, 14), keyboard (track 4), percussions (tracks 4, 14), vocoder (track 4), programming (tracks 4, 14)
- Nat Valente – gang vocals (track 14)
- Alexei Viktorovitch – chorus (track 18)
- Joshua Von Bergmann – drums (track 11)
- Tom Wiklund – instruments and programming (track 8), chorus (track 8)
- Amber Wright – choir (tracks 11, 15, 17, 19)
- Ed Wynn – horn (tracks 15, 19)
- Young – guitar (tracks 6, 9, 11, 13, 15–17)
- Jordan "DJ Swivel" Young – chorus (tracks 16, 18), recording engineer (track 16)
- Zakiya Young – choir (tracks 11, 15, 17, 19)
- Etta Zelmani – chorus (track 18)

Technical

- Hector Castillo – mix engineer (track 10)
- DJ Riggins – mix engineer (tracks 7, 9, 11)
- Chris Gehringer – mastering (all tracks)
- Carlos Imperatori – mix engineer (track 10)
- Jaycen Joshua – mix engineer (tracks 2, 5, 7, 9, 11)
- Jung Woo-young – digital editing (track 4), recording engineer (tracks 6, 13, 15–17)
- Kim Ji-yeon – recording engineer (tracks 1, 4)
- Ken Lewis – mix engineer (tracks 1, 6, 12)
- Claudius Mittendorfer – mix engineer (track 16)
- Park Eun-jung – recording engineer (track 16)
- Park Jin-se – recording engineer (track 2)
- Erik Reichers – recording engineer (tracks 11, 15, 17, 19)
- Jacob Richards – mix engineer (tracks 7, 9, 11)
- Michel "Lindgren" Schultz – recording engineer (track 2)
- Max Seaberg – mix engineer (tracks 7, 9, 11)
- Phil Tan – mix engineer (track 8)
- Alex Williams – recording engineer (tracks 2, 11)
- Yang Ga – mix engineer (tracks 4, 13, 17, 19)
- Bill Zimmerman – mix engineer (track 8)

== Charts ==
=== Weekly charts ===
Weekly chart performance
Chart (2020–2022)	Peak position
Argentine Albums (CAPIF)	5
Australian Albums (ARIA)	1
Austrian Albums (Ö3 Austria)	1
Belgian Albums (Ultratop Flanders)	1
Belgian Albums (Ultratop Wallonia)	2
Canadian Albums (Billboard)	1
Croatian International Albums (HDU)	10
Czech Albums (ČNS IFPI)	12
Danish Albums (Hitlisten)	4
Dutch Albums (Album Top 100)	1
Estonian Albums (Eesti Tipp-40)	1
Finnish Albums (Suomen virallinen lista)	2
French Albums (SNEP)	1
German Albums (Offizielle Top 100)	1
Greek Albums (IFPI)	61
Hungarian Albums (MAHASZ)	1
Icelandic Albums (Tónlistinn)	12
Irish Albums (Official Charts)	1
Italian Albums (FIMI)	3
Japanese Albums (Oricon)	1
Japanese Hot Albums (Billboard Japan)	1
Lithuanian Albums (AGATA)	1
New Zealand Albums (RMNZ)	1
Mexican Albums (AMPROFON)	3
Norwegian Albums (VG-lista)	2
Polish Albums (ZPAV)	1
Portuguese Albums (AFP)	1
Scottish Albums (Official Charts)	1
Slovak Albums (ČNS IFPI)	22
South Korean Albums (Gaon)	1
Spanish Albums (Promusicae)	1
Swedish Albums (Sverigetopplistan)	3
Swiss Albums (Schweizer Hitparade)	1
UK Albums (Official Charts)	1
UK Independent Albums (Official Charts)	1
US Billboard 200	1
US Independent Albums (Billboard)	1
US World Albums (Billboard)	1

=== Monthly charts ===
Monthly chart performance
Chart (2020)	Peak position
Japanese Albums (Oricon)	1
South Korean Albums (Gaon)	1

=== Year-end charts ===
Year-end chart performance
Chart (2020)	Position
Australian Albums (ARIA)	14
Austrian Albums (Ö3 Austria)	32
Belgian Albums (Ultratop Flanders)	24
Belgian Albums (Ultratop Wallonia)	33
Danish Albums (Hitlisten)	87
Dutch Albums (Album Top 100)	45
French Albums (SNEP)	42
German Albums (Offizielle Top 100)	12
Hungarian Albums - Rank (MAHASZ)	3
Hungarian Albums - Sales (MAHASZ)	6
Italian Albums (FIMI)	68
Japan Hot Albums (Billboard Japan)	10
Japanese Albums (Oricon)	5
New Zealand Albums (RMNZ)	20
Polish Albums (ZPAV)	17
Portuguese Albums (AFP)	1
South Korean Albums (Gaon)	1
Spanish Albums (PROMUSICAE)	33
Swiss Albums (Schweizer Hitparade)	7
UK Albums (OCC)	48
US Billboard 200	20
US Independent Albums (Billboard)	2
Chart (2021)	Position
Belgian Albums (Ultratop Flanders)	175
French Albums (SNEP)	132
Hungarian Albums (MAHASZ)	49
Japanese Albums (Oricon)	58
South Korean Albums (Gaon)	41
US Billboard 200	113
US Independent Albums (Billboard)	11
Chart (2022)	Position
South Korean Albums (Circle)	47

== Certifications and sales ==
Certifications and sales
Region	Certification	Certified units/sales
Belgium (BRMA)	Gold	10,000^{‡}
Canada (Music Canada)	2× Platinum	160,000 ‡ / 31,000
Denmark (IFPI Danmark)	Gold	10,000^{‡}
France (SNEP)	Platinum	100,000^{‡}
Hungary (MAHASZ)	Gold	2,000^{‡}
Italy (FIMI)	Gold	25,000^{‡}
Japan (RIAJ)	Platinum	469,933
New Zealand (RMNZ)	Platinum	15,000^{‡}
Poland (ZPAV)	Platinum	20,000^{‡}
South Korea (KMCA)	5× Million	5,014,888
Spain (Promusicae)	Gold	20,000^{‡}
United Kingdom (BPI)	Gold	100,000^{‡}
United States (RIAA)	Platinum	674,000
Summaries
Worldwide (IFPI)	—	4,800,000
^{‡} Sales+streaming figures based on certification alone.

== Release history ==
Release formats for Map of the Soul: 7
Country/Region	Date	Format	Label	Ref.
Various	February 21, 2020	Digital download; streaming	Big Hit; Dreamus	
South Korea	February 21, 2020	CD	Big Hit; Dreamus	
Japan	February 21, 2020	CD	Big Hit; Dreamus; Virgin	
North America	February 21, 2020	CD	Big Hit; Columbia	
Europe	February 21, 2020	CD	Big Hit; Columbia	
Austria	February 24, 2020	CD	Big Hit; Sony Music Germany	
Germany	February 24, 2020	CD	Big Hit; Sony Music Germany	
Switzerland	February 24, 2020	CD	Big Hit; Sony Music Germany	

== See also ==
- List of 2020 albums
- List of best-selling albums in South Korea
- List of Billboard 200 number-one albums of 2020
- List of Gaon Album Chart number ones of 2020
- List of number-one albums of 2020 (Australia)
- List of number-one hits of 2020 (Austria)
- List of number-one albums of 2020 (Belgium)
- List of number-one albums of 2020 (Canada)
- List of number-one hits of 2020 (France)
- List of number-one hits of 2020 (Germany)
- List of number-one albums of 2020 (Ireland)
- List of Oricon number-one albums of 2020
- List of number-one albums from the 2020s (New Zealand)
- List of number-one albums of 2020 (Portugal)
- List of number-one albums of 2020 (Spain)
- List of UK top-ten albums in 2020
- List of UK Albums Chart number ones of the 2020s
