= Romeo & Juliet (Mozzik and Loredana song) =

2019 single by Mozzik and Loredana

- The official cover art for "Romeo & Juliet"

Single by Mozzik and Loredana
- Released: 1 February 2019
- Genre: Hip Hop/Rap
- Length: 3:18
- Label: Independent
- Songwriters: Mozzik; Loredana
- Producers: Miksu; Macloud

Mozzik singles chronology
"Nana" (2018)	"Romeo & Juliet" (2019)	"Pinocchio" (2019)

Loredana singles chronology
"Milliondollar$mile" (2018)	"Romeo & Juliet" (2019)	"Labyrinth" (2019)

Music video
- "Romeo & Juliet" on YouTube

"Romeo & Juliet" is a song recorded by Kosovar rapper Mozzik and Kosovar rapper Loredana. An Albanian and German rap song, it was solely written by the rappers themselves. German producers Miksu and Macloud were additionally hired for the song's composition and production process.

== Background ==
=== Composition ===
In terms of music notation, "Romeo & Juliet" was composed in 4/4 time and is performed in the key of F♭ minor in common time with a tempo of 125 beats per minute. The song was solely written by both Loredana and Mozzik. Its composition and production process was handled by Joshua Allery (Miksu) and Laurin Auth (Macloud). The song marks the second time that the couple has collaborated musically on a recording, after their collaboration on "Bonnie & Clyde" in 2018.

=== Promotion ===
The accompanying music video was produced and shot by Entermedia and premiered onto the official YouTube channel of Loredana on 31 January 2018, where it has since amassed a total of 65 million views.

== Personnel ==
Credits adapted from Tidal.

- Loredana – performing, vocals, songwriting
- Mozzik – performing, vocals, songwriting
- Macloud (Laurin Auth) – composition, production
- Miksu (Joshua Allery) – composition, production

== Charts ==
Chart (2018)	Peak position
Albania (The Top List)	3
Austria (Ö3 Austria Top 40)	4
Germany (GfK)	2
Germany Digital (Germany Songs)	2
Switzerland (Schweizer Hitparade)	4

== Release history ==
Region	Date	Format(s)	Label	Ref.
Various	1 February 2019	Digital download; streaming	Independent	
