= Kein Plan =

2019 single by Loredana featuring Mero

Single by Loredana featuring Mero

from the album King Lori
- Released: 6 September 2019
- Length: 2:36
- Label: Groove Attack; Loredana
- Songwriters: Enes Meral; Loredana Zefi
- Producers: Joshua Allery; Laurin Auth

Loredana singles chronology
"Eiskalt" (2019)	"Kein Plan" (2019)	"Genick" (2019)

Mero singles chronology
"No Name" (2019)	"Kein Plan" (2019)	"Meine Hand" (2019)

Music video
- "Kein Plan" on YouTube

"Kein Plan" (German pronunciation: [kaɪn ˈplaːn]; transl. "No Plan") is a song recorded by Kosovar rapper Loredana featuring German rapper Mero, released as the fourth single from her debut studio album King Lori (2019). The German-language rap song was written by the aforementioned rappers and produced by German producers Macloud and Miksu.

== Background and music video ==
"Kein Plan" runs for a duration time of two minutes and thirty five seconds. In terms of music notation, the song is performed in the key of C♭ minor in common time with a vivace tempo of 102 beats per minute. It was written by the performing artists while being composed by German composer Chris Plowman and Loredana's frequent collaborators, German producers Macloud and Miksu. The latter producers alongside LEE were additionally responsible for the production whilst it was entirely mastered by Lex Barkey.

An accompanying music video was uploaded to the official YouTube channel of Loredana on 5 September 2019 around 23:59 (CET), where it has since amassed a total of 64 million views. It was directed by Matteo Attanasio of the Fati Media Group in Germany and produced by Flo Brunner. After its release, the music video was viewed 3.5 million times in its first 24 hours.

== Charts ==
Chart (2019)	Peak position
Austria (Ö3 Austria Top 40)	2
Germany (GfK)	1
Switzerland (Schweizer Hitparade)	4

== Certifications ==
Region	Certification	Certified units/sales
Germany (BVMI)	Gold	200,000^{‡}
^{‡} Sales+streaming figures based on certification alone.

== See also ==
- List of number-one hits of 2020 (Germany)
