= Angst (Loredana song) =

2020 single by Loredana

Single by Loredana featuring Rymez
- Language: German
- Released: 6 March 2020
- Length: 2:56
- Label: Groove Attack; Loredana
- Songwriters: Loredana Zefi; Ghassan Ramlawi
- Producers: Joshua Allery; Rymez

Loredana singles chronology
"Kein Wort" (2020)	"Angst" (2020)	"Du bist mein" (2020)

Rymez singles chronology
"Don Walk" (2019)	"Angst" (2020)

Music video
- "Angst" on YouTube

"Angst" (German pronunciation: [aŋst]; transl. "Fear") is a song by Kosovar rapper Loredana featuring English producer Rymez. It is a German-language rap song, written by Loredana and German rapper Zuna, while being produced by German producer Miksu, alongside Rymez.

== Background and composition ==
"Angst" was written by Loredana and German rapper Zuna, while being produced by English producer Rymez together with German producer Miksu.

Lyrically, it mainly see Loredana settling up with the media who "solely await her next scandal" and name dropping daily newspaper publications, such as Bild Zeitung and Blick, who mostly picked up on her allegations of fraud in June 2019. Few of the lyrics are also dedicated to her former husband and rapper Mozzik, whom she divorced in late 2019, and asks people to treat him with due respect. Prior to its release, "Angst" was expected to be a diss track to the aforementioned rapper. Later in the song, Zefi addresses rumours of her exploiting her daughter Hana as a "weapon".

=== Reception ===
Disregarding the lyrics, the editors of Laut.de thought the song was "pretty damn solid" and viewed the dancehall-production as an appropriate platform for the rapper to "vent her rage".

== Music video ==
The accompanying music video for "Angst", directed by Dominik Braz, was released to the official YouTube channel of Loredana on 6 March 2020, where it has since amassed a total of nine million views. It prominently features shots of Loredana in a see-through box surrounded by paparazzi taking pictures of her which reflects her transparent public image. The video closes out with a heart-shaped picture of her ex-husband Mozzik kissing their daughter Hana.

== Personnel ==
Credits adapted from Tidal and YouTube.

- Loredana Zefi – performing, songwriting, vocals
- Joshua Allery (Miksu) – composing, production
- Rymez – composing, production
- Laurin Auth – composing
- Ghassan Ramlawi (Zuna) – songwriting
- Dominik Braz – video directing
- Fati – photograph directing
- Nancho Motzer – video production
- Jennifer Bachert – video production
- Samet Kaya – production supervising

== Charts ==
Chart (2020)	Peak position
Austria (Ö3 Austria Top 40)	1
Germany (GfK)	1
Switzerland (Schweizer Hitparade)	3

== See also ==
- List of number-one hits of 2020 (Austria)
- List of number-one hits of 2020 (Germany)
