= Mit dir =

2019 single by Loredana

- The official cover of "Mit dir"

Single by Loredana
- Language: German
- Released: 20 February 2019
- Genre: Pop
- Length: 2:38
- Label: Independent
- Songwriter: Loredana Zefi
- Producers: Joshua Allery; Laurin Auth

Loredana singles chronology
"Genick" (2019)	"Mit dir" (2019)	"Kein Wort" (2020)

Music video
- "Mit dir" on YouTube

"Mit dir" (Swiss Standard German pronunciation: [mɪt ˈdiːr]; transl. "With you") is a song by Kosovar rapper Loredana. A German-language song, it was written by the rapper herself, and composed and produced by German producers Macloud and Miksu.

The official music video for the song was uploaded on 19 December 2019 around 23:59 (CET) onto YouTube to accompany the single's release. A vibrant video, it prominently features scenes of Loredana performing to the song with multiple backup dancers through different scenes.

== Background ==
=== Composition ===
"Mit dir" was entirely written by Loredana herself and produced by her regular collaborators German producers Macloud and Miksu. German producer Lex Barkey was additionally helmed for the mastering process. The German-language pop song has a duration time of two minutes and thirty eight seconds and is, in regard to the music notation, performed in the key of D♭ minor in common time with a moderate tempo of 98 beats per minute.

=== Music video ===
An accompanying music video was uploaded onto the official YouTube channel of Loredana on 19 December 2019 around 23:59 (CET), where it has since amassed a total of 18 million views. It was directed by Felix Aaron and produced by Ricarda Haehn, while Julian Jonas Schmitt was hired as the director of photography of the video. Albanian styling duo Sellma Kasumovic and Kaci Lleshi were credited as the make-up artist and hair stylist, respectively. The choreography used in the video was created by Franka Marlene Foth.

== Track listing ==
- Digital download
1. "Mit dir" – 2:38

== Charts ==
Chart (2019)	Peak position
Austria (Ö3 Austria Top 40)	29
Germany (GfK)	9
Switzerland (Schweizer Hitparade)	20

== Release history ==
Region	Date	Format(s)	Label	Ref.
Various	20 December 2019	Digital download; streaming	Independent	
