= Jetzt rufst du an =

2019 single by Loredana

- Official cover

Single by Loredana

from the album King Lori
- Released: 5 July 2019
- Length: 2:31
- Label: Groove Attack; Loredana
- Songwriters: Karolina Schrader; Loredana Zefi
- Producers: Joshua Allery; Laurin Auth

Loredana singles chronology
"Labyrinth" (2019)	"Jetzt rufst du an" (2019)	"Eiskalt" (2019)

Music video
- "Jetzt rufst du an" on YouTube

"Jetzt rufst du an" (German pronunciation: [ˈjɛtst ˌruːfst du ˈan]; transl. "Now you call") is a song by Kosovar rapper Loredana, released as the second single from her debut studio album, King Lori (2019). The song was written by the aforementioned rapper, and composed and produced by German producers Macloud and Miksu.

== Background ==
=== Composition and reception ===
"Jetzt rufst du an" was written by Loredana alongside Karolina Schrader, and German producers Macloud and Miksu, who also produced the song. It was additionally composed by the aforementioned producers together with German composer Daniel Finke. Lasting two minutes and thirty one seconds, it is performed in the key of E♭ major in common time with a moderate tempo of 102 beats per minute.

Lyrically, "Jetzt rufst du an" questions Loredana's love interest about why he didn't valued her before her success. Throughout the lyrics, she asks him why he wasn't willing to be there for her in time of greatest need and more precisely, she accuses him for coming back only for her money and fame.

WDR writer Cara Wolff described "Jetzt rufst du an" as a typical "auto-tune rap song" incorporating a "danceable trap beat". More positively, German website Laut.de praised the "catchy" beats and the use of a marimbaphone writing: "it fits well into the overall picture of the song".

== Music video ==
An accompanying music video was released onto the official YouTube channel of Loredana on 4 July 2019, where it has since accumulated more than 36 million views. The aforementioned video was directed by Flo Brunner and produced by Laurent Arber and Sefa Kaya from the Fati Media Group in Germany. It commences with shots of red-hanging telephone receivers and follows with Loredana walking towards a see-through telephone booth. Scenes interspersed through the main plot portray her and her former husband Mozzik performing to the song. The clip continues in a similar way and ends with shots of Loredana and two fellow females.

== Charts ==
Chart (2018)	Peak position
Austria (Ö3 Austria Top 40)	3
Germany (GfK)	2
Switzerland (Schweizer Hitparade)	4
