= Kein Wort =

2020 single by Loredana and Juju

Single by Juju and Loredana featuring Macloud and Miksu
- Released: 16 January 2020
- Genre: Pop rap
- Length: 2:42
- Label: JINX Music
- Songwriters: Judith Wessendorf; Loredana Zefi
- Producers: Joshua Allery; Laurin Auth; Krutsch; Shucati

Juju singles chronology
"Hi Babe" (2019)	"Kein Wort" (2020)	"Vertrau mir" (2020)

Loredana singles chronology
"Mit dir" (2019)	"Kein Wort" (2020)	"Angst" (2020)

Music video
- "Kein Wort" on YouTube

"Kein Wort" (German pronunciation: [kaɪn ˈvɔʁt]; transl. "No Words") is a song recorded by German rapper Juju and Swiss rapper Loredana featuring German producers Miksu and Macloud. It was composed and produced by the aforementioned producers together with German composers Krutsch and Shucati.

Commercially, "Kein Wort" experienced success charting at number one in Austria and Germany becoming Juju's third and Loredana's second single to reach number one in both countries, respectively. An official music video for the song was shot by Fati.tv and was uploaded on 16 January 2020 to accompany the single's release. It portrays the rappers performing the song in different locations and ambiances.

== Background ==
=== Composition ===
"Kein Wort" was announced to be released on 10 January 2020 through a post on the Instagram account of both rappers. It was solely written by Juju and Loredana and produced by the latter's regular collaborators, German producers Macloud and Miksu alongside German composers Krutsch and Shucati. It was composed in 4/4 time and is performed in the key of F♭ minor with a tempo of 160 beats per minute.

=== Promotion ===
"Kein Wort" was released on digital platforms and to streaming services as a single on 16 January 2020 through JINX Music. An accompanying music video was directed by Fati.tv and premiered on Loredana's YouTube channel on 16 January 2020, where it has since amassed a total of 37 million views.

== Personnel ==
Credits adapted from Tidal and YouTube.

- Juju – performing, vocals, songwriting
- Loredana – performing, vocals, songwriting
- Laurin Auth (Macloud) – composition, production
- Joshua Allery (Miksu) – composition, production
- Krutsch – composition, production
- Shucati – composition
- Neslihan Degerli – styling
- Hakan Keppler – styling assisting
- Imke Rabiega – styling assisting
- Sellma Kasumovic – make-up
- Kaci Lleshi – hair styling

== Charts ==
=== Weekly charts ===
Chart (2020)	Peak position
Austria (Ö3 Austria Top 40)	1
Germany (GfK)	1
Switzerland (Schweizer Hitparade)	3

=== Year-end charts ===
Chart (2020)	Position
Austria (Ö3 Austria Top 40)	48

== Certifications ==
Region	Certification	Certified units/sales
Austria (IFPI Austria)	Gold	15,000^{‡}
Germany (BVMI)	Platinum	400,000^{‡}
^{‡} Sales+streaming figures based on certification alone.

== Release history ==
Region	Date	Format(s)	Label	Ref.
Various	16 January 2020	Digital download; streaming	JINX Music	

== See also ==
- List of number-one hits of 2020 (Austria)
- List of number-one hits of 2020 (Germany)
