= Genick =

2019 single by Loredana

Single by Loredana

from the album King Lori
- Released: 13 September 2019
- Length: 3:25
- Label: Groove Attack; Loredana
- Composers: Macloud and Miksu
- Lyricist: Loredana Zefi
- Producers: Joshua Allery; Laurin Auth

Groove Attack; Loredana; singles chronology
"Kein Plan" (2019)	"Genick" (2019)	"Mit dir" (2019)

Music video
- "Genick" on YouTube

"Genick" (German pronunciation: [ɡəˈnɪk]; transl. "Neck") is a song recorded by Kosovar rapper Loredana, released as the fifth single from her debut studio album, King Lori (2019). The song was written by the rapper herself, and composed and produced by German producers Macloud and Miksu.

Commercially, "Genick" experienced great success in Austria, Germany and Switzerland reaching number three in all three countries, respectively. It additionally peaked at number fifty eight in Albania.

== Background ==
=== Composition ===
"Genick" was entirely written by Loredana herself while both, the composition and production, was handled by German producers Macloud and Miksu. Lasting three minutes and twenty five seconds, it is performed in the key of A♭ minor in common time with a moderate tempo of 105 beats per minute. Characterised as a trap ballad, its lyrical themes make reference to a past romantic relationship and the new beginnings developing out of the relationship. Critics noted the theme to be a response to the personal case between Loredana and her former husband, Mozzik.

=== Music video ===
Met with mixed reviews from music critics, an accompanying music video for "Genick" was uploaded to Loredana's official YouTube channel on 12 September 2019, where it has since amassed a total of 40 million views. As the video progresses, Loredana repeatedly targets a helpless man with a gun and even kills him before the end of the video.

== Charts ==
Chart (2018)	Peak position
Albania (The Top List)	58
Austria (Ö3 Austria Top 40)	3
Germany (GfK)	3
Switzerland (Schweizer Hitparade)	3

== Certifications ==
Region	Certification	Certified units/sales
Germany (BVMI)	Gold	200,000^{‡}
^{‡} Sales+streaming figures based on certification alone.
