= Milliondollarsmile =

2018 single by Loredana

"Milliondollar$mile"

Single by Loredana
- Language: Albanian; German
- Released: 7 December 2018
- Length: 2:54
- Label: Independent
- Songwriters: Loredana; Macloud; Miksu
- Producers: Macloud; Miksu

Loredana singles chronology
"Bonnie & Clyde" (2018)	"Milliondollar$mile" (2018)	"Romeo & Juliet" (2019)

Music video
- "Milliondollar$mile" on YouTube

"Milliondollarsmile" (stylized as "Milliondollar$mile") is a song by Kosovar rapper Loredana.

== Composition and reception ==
With a length of two minutes and 54 seconds, "Milliondollar$mile" was independently released as a single for digital download and streaming in various countries on 7 December 2018. The single was written by Loredana and German producers Macloud (Laurin Auth) and Miksu (Joshua Allery), with the production handled by the latter two. It was written mostly in German, though a few lyrics are in Albanian. Austrian website Red Bull lauded the Albanian lyrics as well as the single's cover art. Laura Leuenberger from Swiss broadcaster SRF wrote that Loredana delivers autotune with "attitude" confidently spitting over the sound.

== Music video ==
The accompanying music video for "Milliondollar$mile" was uploaded to Loredana's official YouTube channel on 7 December 2018, simultaneously with the single's release. Produced by Orkan Çe, it was filmed at the annual Lozerner Määs fair in the city of Lucerne, Switzerland, and features the guest appearance from then-husband and Kosovo-Albanian rapper Mozzik. According to Red Bull, it may be concluded that American rapper 50 Cent and group G-Unit was once important to Loredana.

== Credits and personnel ==
Credits adapted from Spotify and YouTube.

- Loredana – performing, vocals, songwriting
- Macloud (Laurin Auth) – composition, production
- Miksu (Joshua Allery) – composition, production
- Orkan Çe – video production

== Track listing ==
- Digital download
1. "Milliondollar$mile" – 2:54

== Charts ==
Chart (2018)	Peak position
Austria (Ö3 Austria Top 40)	19
Germany (GfK)	11
Switzerland (Schweizer Hitparade)	30

== Release history ==
Region	Date	Format(s)	Label	Ref.
Various	7 December 2018	Digital download; streaming	Independent	
