= King Lori =

2019 album by Loredana

Studio album by Loredana
- Released: 13 September 2019
- Length: 34:46
- Language: German
- Label: Groove Attack; Loredana
- Producer: Lee; Macloud; Miksu; Mr. Finch; Tilia

Singles from King Lori
- 1. "Labyrinth" Released: 7 June 2019; 2. "Jetzt rufst du an" Released: 5 July 2019; 3. "Eiskalt" Released: 2 August 2019; 4. "Kein Plan" Released: 6 September 2019; 5. "Genick" Released: 13 September 2019

King Lori (stylized in all caps) is the debut studio album by Kosovar rapper Loredana released on 13 September 2019 by Groove Attack. The production and writing process for the record was mostly handled by Loredana herself alongside Macloud and Miksu with LEE, Mr. Finch and Tilia providing additional production.

== Track listing ==
Credits adapted from Tidal.

King Lori
No.	Title	Writer(s)	Producer(s)	Length
1.	"Hana"	Loredana Zefi	Joshua Allery; Laurin Auth	2:50
2.	"Labyrinth"	Loredana Zefi	Joshua Allery; Laurin Auth	2:35
3.	"OMG"	Loredana Zefi	Joshua Allery; Laurin Auth	2:50
4.	"Jetzt rufst du an"	Laurin Auth; Loredana Zefi; Karolina Schrader; Mr. Finch	Joshua Allery; Laurin Auth; Mr. Finch	2:31
5.	"Keine Rosen"	Loredana Zefi	Joshua Allery; Laurin Auth	3:19
6.	"Durch die Nacht"	Laurin Auth; Loredana Zefi	Joshua Allery; Laurin Auth	2:31
7.	"Feuer" (featuring Getinjo)	Getoar Aliu; Julian Otto; Loredana Zefi	Joshua Allery; Laurin Auth	2:55
8.	"Eiskalt" (featuring Mozzik)	Gramoz Aliu; Loredana Zefi	Joshua Allery; Laurin Auth	2:31
9.	"Kein Plan" (featuring Mero)	Enes Meral; Loredana Zefi	Joshua Allery; Laurin Auth; LEE	2:35
10.	"Nicht allein" (featuring Mozzik)	Gramoz Aliu; Loredana Zefi	Joshua Allery; Laurin Auth; Tilia	3:06
11.	"Genick"	Loredana Zefi	Joshua Allery; Laurin Auth	3:25
12.	"Nicht wie Du"	Loredana Zefi	Joshua Allery; Laurin Auth	2:38
Total length:				34:46

== Charts ==
=== Weekly charts ===
Chart (2018)	Peak position
Austrian Albums (Ö3 Austria)	2
German Albums (Offizielle Top 100)	3
German Hip Hop Albums (Top 20 Hip Hop)	2
Swiss Albums (Schweizer Hitparade)	2

=== Year-end charts ===
Chart (2019)	Position
Austrian Albums (Ö3 Austria)	67

== Release history ==
Region	Date	Format	Label	Ref.
Various	23 August 2019	Digital download; streaming	Groove Attack; Loredana	
Various	13 September 2019	CD; limited box set	Groove Attack; Loredana	
