= Sonnenbrille =

2018 debut single by Loredana

Single by Loredana
- Language: German
- English title: "Sunglasses"
- Released: 15 June 2018
- Length: 2:41
- Label: Independent
- Songwriters: Loredana; Macloud; Miksu
- Producers: Macloud; Miksu

Loredana singles chronology
"Sonnenbrille" (2018)	"Bonnie & Clyde" (2018)

Music video
- "Sonnenbrille" on YouTube

"Sonnenbrille" (German: [ˈzɔnənˌbʁɪlə]; transl. 'Sunglasses') is the debut single by Kosovar rapper Loredana. The song was written by Loredana alongside Macloud and Miksu, who also handled the production. It was independently released as the debut single for digital download and streaming on 15 June 2018. Music critics gave mixed to positive reviews of the song, criticising the quality of the lyrics and commending Loredana's rapping techniques. Commercially, it reached the top 15 in Albania, Austria, Germany and Switzerland, while being awarded gold certifications by the Austrian International Federation of the Phonographic Industry (IFPI Austria) and German Bundesverband Musikindustrie (BVMI). An accompanying music video was uploaded to Loredana's YouTube channel simultaneously with the debut single's release on 15 June.

== Background and composition ==
Born in 1995 to Albanian parents in Lucerne, Switzerland, Loredana gained recognition as an influencer for her short social media videos featuring dancing and lip-syncing content, as well as her relationship with Kosovo-Albanian rapper Mozzik. At age 18, she became interested in music and wrote songs for other artists together with German producer Macloud. During an interview with Swiss website Lyrics Magazin, Loredana stated that she was planning to reject "Sonnenbrille" but was then convinced to keep it as her own song. The song was subsequently independently released as a single for digital download and streaming in various countries on 15 June 2018. "Sonnenbrille" was co-written by Loredana with German producers Macloud and Miksu, who also produced the single. Lasting two minutes and 41 seconds, the German-language song is about trap and wealth, featuring Loredana singing in Auto-Tune. Lyrics translated into English include: "The sunglasses protect my identity/ They ask me, where they're from, from Fendi, ey".

== Reception and promotion ==
Upon its release, "Sonnenbrille" was met with mixed to positive reviews from music critics. Michael Graber from Luzerner Zeitung was negative towards the single's use of auto-tune and its "meaning[less]" lyrics. Graber further wrote that there is "a terribly superficial world", about "status symbols" that is celebrated in its lyrics, and went on to praise Loredana's "strong" appearance. A writer for BigFM noticed the rapper's technical versatility and sense for melodies and described her rapping as "confidently" and "experienced" yet "routinely" and "creative". Fans of the single included German rapper Farid Bang and Nura as well as Polish rapper Schwesta Ewa, who expressed their support on social media accounts. Commercially, "Sonnenbrille" experienced success on record charts in Albania and German-speaking Europe. In native Switzerland, the single peaked at number 13 on 24 June 2018 and reached the top 15 in Albania, Austria and Germany. Due to high sales, it was certified gold in both Austria and Germany by the International Federation of the Phonographic Industry Austria (IFPI Austria) and Bundesverband Musikindustrie (BVMI), respectively. An accompanying music video was uploaded to Loredana's YouTube channel on 15 June 2018 and was directed by Eugen Kazakov and Mohamed Elbouhlali. Macloud (Laurin Auth) and Mesut Yasar were further hired as production assistants.

== Credits and personnel ==
Credits adapted from Spotify and YouTube.

- Loredana – songwriting, vocals
- Macloud (Laurin Auth) – producing, songwriting, production assistant
- Miksu (Joshua Allery) – producing, songwriting
- Eugen Kazakov – video directing
- Mesut Yasar – production assistant
- Mohamed Elbouhlali – video directing

== Track listing ==
- Digital download and streaming
1. "Sonnenbrille" – 2:41

== Charts ==
Chart performance for "Sonnenbrille"
Chart (2018)	Peak position
Austria (Ö3 Austria Top 40)	8
Germany (GfK)	12
Switzerland (Schweizer Hitparade)	13

== Certifications ==
Certifications and sales for "Sonnenbrille"
Region	Certification	Certified units/sales
Austria (IFPI Austria)	Gold	15,000^{‡}
Germany (BVMI)	Gold	200,000^{‡}
^{‡} Sales+streaming figures based on certification alone.

== Release history ==
Release dates and formats for "Sonnenbrille"
Region	Date	Format(s)	Label	Ref.
Various	15 June 2018	Digital download; streaming	Independent	
