= Juju (German rapper) =

German rapper

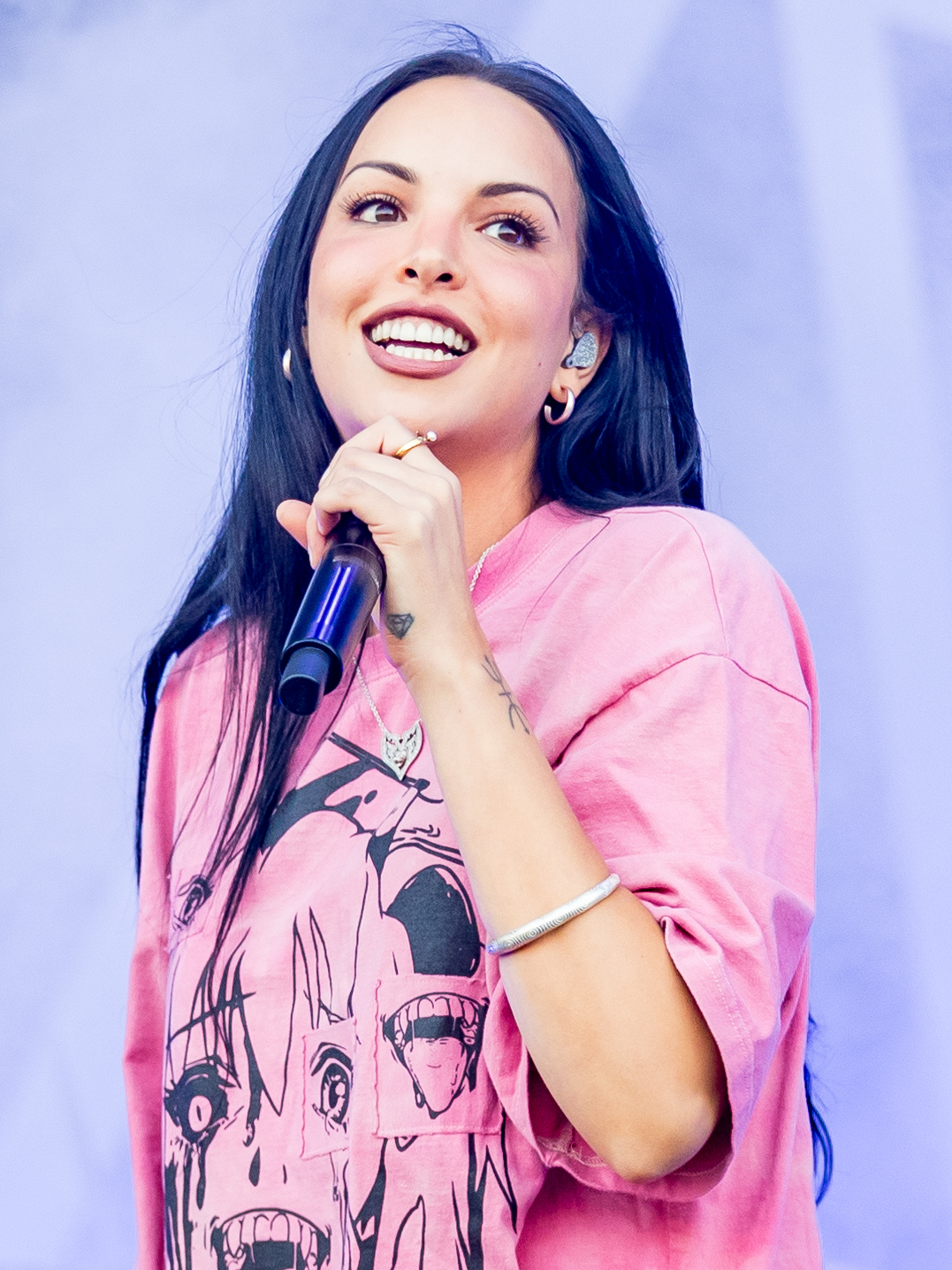
- Juju performing in 2023

Background information
- Born: Judith Wessendorf; 20 November 1992 (age 33); Berlin, Germany
- Origin: Germany, Morocco
- Genres: German hip hop
- Occupation: Rapper
- Years active: 2015-present
- Formerly of: SXTN

Judith Wessendorf (born 20 November 1992), known professionally as Juju, is a German rapper. She rose to prominence as one half of the Berlin hip-hop duo SXTN, alongside Nura.

Her debut solo album, Bling Bling (2019) reached number three on the German Albums Chart. She topped the German Singles Chart with "Melodien" (with Capital Bra), "Vermissen" (with Henning May) and "Kein Wort" (with Loredana).

== Life and career ==
Born in Berlin to a German mother and Moroccan father, Juju grew up with her mother in a poor area in the Berlin district Neukölln. She attended the Ernst-Abbe high school in Neukölln, which she left after ninth grade. As a child, she listened to German gangsta rap (Bushido, Aggro Berlin, Sido, etc.) and since she was 14, Juju started rapping as a hobby in her free time.

In 2010, she met Nura for the first time. Later they formed the German rap crew SXTN. Their first song was Deine Mutter and their most successful Von Party zu Party (which reached 30 million views on YouTube two years later) and Bongzimmer. In 2018, Nura and Juju separated and began their solo careers. Juju reached the top of the German single charts with the singles "Melodien" (with Capital Bra), "Vermissen" (with Henning May) and "Kein Wort" (with Loredana).

== Discography ==
=== Albums ===
List of studio albums, with chart positions and certifications
Title	Album details	Peak chart positions		
Title	Album details	GER	AUT	SWI
Bling Bling	Released: 14 June 2019; Label: JINX Music; Formats: CD, digital download, box set	3	5	15

=== Singles ===
List of singles as lead artist, with chart positions and certifications
Title	Year	Peak chart positions			Certifications	Album
Title	Year	GER	AUT	SWI	Certifications	Album
"Berliner Schnauze" (with Said)	2015	—	—	—		non-album singles
"Winter in Berlin"	2018	—	—	—		non-album singles
"Heroin" (with Ali As)	2018	85	—	—		non-album singles
"Intro"	2019	66	—	—		Bling Bling
"Hardcore High"	2019	20	53	—		Bling Bling
"Bling Bling"	2019	63	—	—		Bling Bling
"Vermissen" (with Henning May)	2019	1	2	13	BVMI: Platinum; IFPI AUT: Platinum	Bling Bling
"Live Bitch"	2019	45	—	—		Bling Bling
"Hi Babe"	2019	12	29	84	BVMI: Gold	Bling Bling
"Kein Wort" (with Loredana)	2020	1	1	3	BVMI: Platinum; IFPI AUT: Gold	Non-album singles
"Vertrau mir"	2020	8	26	71		Non-album singles
"2012" (with Bausa)	2020	2	10	23		100 pro
"Nie wieder sehen"	2022	11	39	65		Non-album single

=== As featured artist ===
List of singles as featured artist, with chart positions and certifications
Title	Year	Peak chart positions			Certifications	Album
Title	Year	GER	AUT	SWI	Certifications	Album
"Alkohol fließt" (Karaz featuring Juju)	2017	—	—	—		Identität
"Melodien" (Capital Bra featuring Juju)	2018	1	1	1	BVMI: Platinum	non-album singles
"Lambo Diablo GT (Remix)" (Capo featuring Nimo and Juju)	2019	21	39	—		non-album singles
"Hype" (4Squad featuring Juju)	2019	—	—	—		non-album singles
"Wenn du mich siehst" (RAF Camora featuring Juju)	2021	2	3	6		Zukunft II

=== Other charted songs ===
Title	Year	Peak chart positions			Album
Title	Year	GER	AUT	SWI	Album
"Sommer in Berlin"	2019	60	—	—	Bling Bling
"Ich müsste lügen"	2019	62	—	—	Bling Bling
"Freisein" (featuring Xavier Naidoo)	2019	91	—	—	Bling Bling
"Coco Chanel"	2019	94	—	—	Bling Bling
"Bye Bye"	2019	99	—	—	Bling Bling

== Awards and nominations ==
=== Results ===
Year	Award	Nomination	Work	Result	Ref.
2019	1Live Krone Awards	Best Single	Vermissen (with Henning May)	Won	
2019	1Live Krone Awards	Best Female Artist	Herself	Won	
2019	Bravo Otto Awards	Hip-Hop national	Herself	Silver	
2019	MTV Europe Music Awards	Best German Act	Herself	Won	
2019	HipHop.de Awards	Best Album national	Bling Bling	Won	
2019	HipHop.de Awards	Best Song national	Vermissen (with Henning May)	Won	
2019	HipHop.de Awards	Lyricist Of The Year	Herself	Nominated	
2019	HipHop.de Awards	Best Line	Live Bitch	Nominated	
2019	HipHop.de Awards	Best Rap-Solo-Act national	Herself	Nominated	
2019	Hype Awards	Female Artist	Herself	Nominated	
2019	Hype Awards	Instagram Account	Herself	Nominated	
2020	1Live Krone Awards	Best Female Artist	Herself	Nominated	
2020	1Live Krone Awards	Best Hip-Hop Act	Herself	Nominated	
2020	Bravo Otto Awards	Hip-Hop national	Herself	Gold	
2020	HipHop.de Awards	Best Song National	Kein Wort (with Loredana)	Nominated	
2020	HipHop.de Awards	Best Song National	2012 (with Bausa)	Nominated	
2022	HipHop.de Awards	Best Song National	Erkläre mir die Liebe (with Chapo102, Phillip Poisel)	Pending	
2022	HipHop.de Awards	Best Live-Act National	Herself	Pending	
2022	HipHop.de Awards	Best Line	for Fick dein Insta	Pending	

== Tours ==
=== Headlining ===
- 2019: Bling Bling Tour
- 2020-2022: Juju Live (cancelled due to COVID-19 pandemic)
- 2022: Fick Dein Insta Tour
