= Loredana Zefi =

Swiss-born rapper (born 1995)

Loredana Zefi Adeyemi
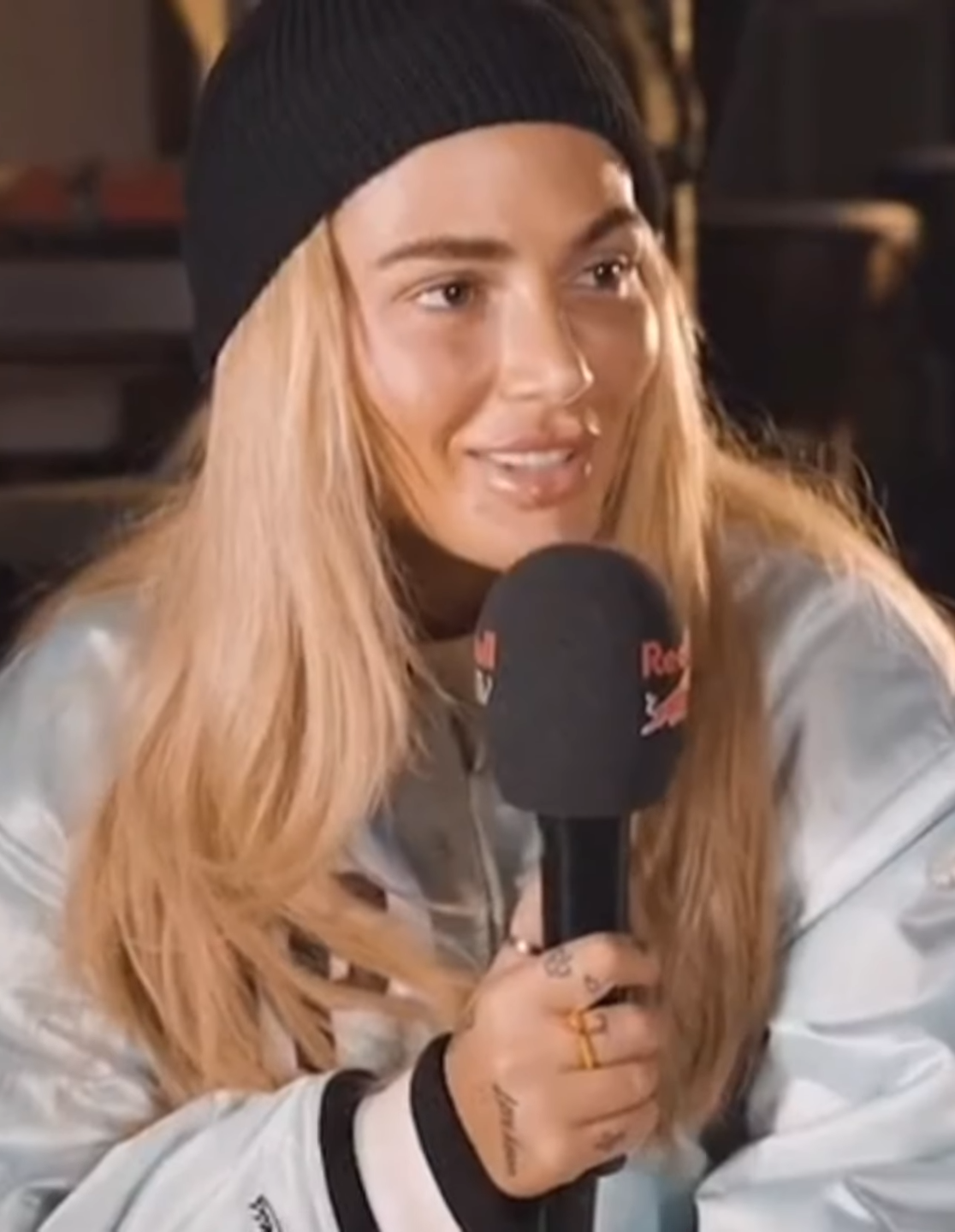
- Zefi in 2021
- Born: 1 September 1995 (age 31); Lucerne, Switzerland
- Citizenship: Kosovo
- Occupations: Rapper; singer
- Years active: 2018–present
- Spouse: Mozzik (m. 2018; div. 2021) Karim Adeyemi (m. 2024)
- Children: 1
- Musical career
- Genres: Hip-hop; pop
- Label: Sony

Loredana Zefi Adeyemi (Albanian: [lɔɾɛˈdana ˈzɛfi]; born 1 September 1995), often known as simply Loredana, is a Swiss-born Kosovar rapper and singer of Albanian descent. Her debut single, "Sonnenbrille", became a commercial success in Albania and German-speaking Europe, and received two gold certifications in Austria and Germany. In September 2018, Loredana signed with German subsidiary of Sony Music and released the commercially successful single "Bonnie & Clyde" with husband Mozzik. Her debut studio album, King Lori, followed in September 2019 and reached the top three in the latter countries and Switzerland. It featured several successful singles, including "Eiskalt", "Genick", "Jetzt rufst du an", as well as the rapper's first number-one single in Germany, "Kein Plan".

Loredana released four subsequent number-one single's, "Angst", "Du bist mein", "Kein Wort" and "Nicht verdient", in 2020. Her second studio album, Medusa (2020), reached the top 20 in Austria, Germany and Switzerland. Following a brief hiatus, Loredana and Mozzik released their first collaborative album, No Rich Parents, in 2021, which featured the number-one single "Rosenkrieg". She has received several awards and nominations, including the Bravo Otto Awards, MTV Europe Music Awards and Swiss Music Awards.

== Life and career ==
=== 1995–2018: Early life and career beginnings ===
Loredana was born on 1 September 1995 into an Albanian family from Ferizaj in Lucerne, Switzerland. Her family is Catholic. At the age of 18, she became interested in music and wrote songs for other artists along with German producer Macloud. In 2018, Loredana gained attention as an influencer for her short social media videos featuring dancing and lip-syncing content, as well as her relationship with Kosovo-Albanian rapper Mozzik. Her debut single, "Sonnenbrille", was subsequently released in June 2018. It was commercially successful in Albania and German-speaking Europe, and was certified gold in Austria and Germany. "Bonnie & Clyde" in collaboration with Mozzik was released as her second single in September 2018. The Albanian and German-language hip hop and R&B track was as commercially successful as its predecessor "Sonnenbrille". In the same year, she released her third single "Milliondollar$mile", which achieved moderate success.

=== 2019–present: King Lori and Medusa ===
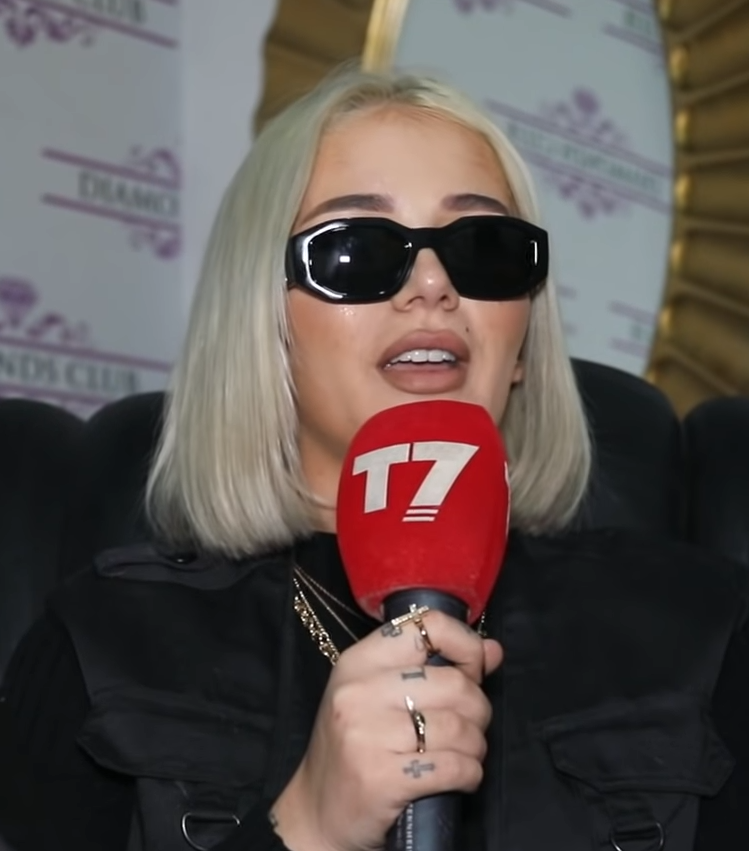
Zefi during an interview in 2019

In 2019, Loredana collaborated a second time with her partner Mozzik on "Romeo & Juliet" peaking at number two in Germany. The two follow-up singles "Labyrinth" and "Jetzt rufst du an", all entered the charts in Austria and Germany. The same year, Loredana released her seventh single "Eiskalt" featuring Mozzik, which was certified gold in Germany and Austria. The single was the third time that the artists collaborated on a recording. A month later, she released her debut studio album, King Lori, featuring the commercially successful singles "Genick", "Mit dir" and the number-one single "Kein Plan". In November 2019, she emerged as the winner of the Best Swiss Act at the 2019 MTV Europe Music Awards. In 2019, Loredana was the second most Googled personality in Switzerland.

In January 2020, the number one single "Kein Wort" was released in collaboration with German rapper Juju. In March 2020, she embarked on the King Lori Tour, which was later cancelled due to the COVID-19 pandemic. The same month, she released her next number one singles "Angst" featuring English producer Rymez, and "Du bist mein" with German rapper Zuna.

== Personal life ==
Loredana Zefi began a relationship with Mozzik and they married in 2018. She gave birth to the couple's daughter on 18 December 2018. The couple separated in October 2019. They were back together again in March 2021, working on a new music project.

In 2023, Loredana started dating FC Barcelona footballer Karim Adeyemi, and they married in a private ceremony in October 2024.

=== Legal issues ===
In May 2019, Loredana was investigated by authorities in Lucerne, Switzerland on suspicion of fraud. She was accused of deceiving a married couple from Valais and obtaining several hundred thousand Swiss francs under false pretenses. The alleged scheme began in 2016 and involved the couple transferring large sums of money after being told various fabricated stories. Loredana was accused of impersonating a lawyer to solicit further payments, and her brothers were also alleged to have been involved in the scheme.

After her release, Loredana held a press conference in Pristina, during which she denied wrongdoing. She maintains the money was handed over voluntarily back in 2016 and that she was not personally involved in the alleged scheme. She also claimed there was no fraud or threats used against the couple.

In October 2020, the criminal proceedings against Loredana were dropped. According to the Lucerne public prosecutor, she admitted the allegations, apologized to the victim, and repaid around 430,000 Swiss francs. The victims' lawyer, Fernando Willisch, confirmed that Loredana took responsibility for her wrongdoing, covered the damages, and apologized.

In November 2025, Loredana and Adeyemi were fined 60 daily payments of €7500 for illegal possession of weapons, after the Federal Police found brass knuckles and a taser in their possession.

== Discography ==
=== Studio albums ===
- King Lori (2019)
- Medusa (2020)

with Mozzik

- No Rich Parents (2021)

Mixtapes

- Mann im Haus (2023)

== Tours ==
=== Headlining ===
- 2020: King Lori Tour (cancelled due COVID-19 pandemic)
- 2021: Loredana Tour (cancelled due COVID-19 pandemic)
- 2023: Wifey Tour

=== Supporting ===
- 2019: Balkan Club Tour (with Mozzik, Gentinjo)

== Awards and nominations ==
Year	Award	Nomination	Work	Result	Ref.
2018	Bravo Otto Awards	Hip Hop Act	Herself	Silver	
2018	1LIVE Krone Awards	Best Hip Hop Act	Herself	Nominated	
2018	Hiphop.de Awards	Best Song National	Sonnenbrille	Nominated	
2019	Hiphop.de Awards	Best Song National	Jetzt rufst du an	Nominated	
2019	Hiphop.de Awards	Best Album National	King Lori	Nominated	
2019	Hiphop.de Awards	Best Newcomer	Herself	Nominated	
2019	Hiphop.de Awards	Best Rap-Solo-Act National	Herself	Nominated	
2019	MTV Europe Music Awards	Best Swiss Act	Herself	Won	
2019	LYRICS Awards	Best Song	Sonnenbrille	Nominated	
2019	1LIVE Krone Awards	Best Hip-Hop Act	Herself	Nominated	
2019	Bravo Otto Awards	Hip-Hop National	Herself	Gold	
2019	Hype Awards	Female Artist	Herself	Won	
2019	Hype Awards	Video	Sonnenbrille	Nominated	
2020	LYRICS Awards	Best Release	King Lori	Nominated	
2020	Swiss Music Awards	Best Female Act	Herself	Nominated	
2020	Swiss Music Awards	Best Breaking Act	Herself	Won	
2020	MTV Europe Music Awards	Best Swiss Act	Herself	Won	
2020	1LIVE Krone Awards	Best Female Artist	Herself	Nominated	
2020	Bravo Otto Awards	Hip-Hop national	Herself	Nominated	
2020	Hiphop.de Awards	Best Song National	Kein Wort (with Juju)	Nominated	
2021	Swiss Music Awards	Best Hit	Nicht verdient (with Capital Bra)	Nominated	
2021	Swiss Music Awards	Best Female Act	Herself	Nominated	
2021	MTV Europe Music Awards	Best Swiss Act	Herself	Nominated	
2021	Bravo Otto Awards	Hip-Hop National	Herself	Nominated	
2021	1LIVE Krone Awards	Best Hip-Hop Act	Herself	Nominated	
2022	Swiss Music Awards	Best Female Act	Herself	Nominated	
2022	Swiss Music Awards	Best Group	Herself & Mozzik	Nominated	
2022	MTV Europe Music Awards	Best Swiss Act	Herself	Won	
2023	Swiss Music Awards	Best Female Act	Herself	Nominated	
