= Bonnie & Clyde (Loredana and Mozzik song) =

2018 single by Loredana and Mozzik

Single by Loredana and Mozzik
- Language: Albanian, German
- Released: 14 September 2018
- Genre: Hip hop; R&B
- Length: 2:55
- Label: Independent
- Songwriters: Loredana; Mozzik; Macloud; Miksu
- Producers: Macloud; Miksu

Loredana singles chronology
"Sonnenbrille" (2018)	"Bonnie & Clyde" (2018)	"Milliondollar$mile" (2018)

Mozzik singles chronology
"Pa Pa" (2018)	"Bonnie & Clyde" (2018)	"Para Siempre" (2018)

Music video
- "Bonnie & Clyde" on YouTube

"Bonnie & Clyde" is a song by Kosovar rapper Loredana and Kosovar rapper Mozzik. The song was written by Loredana and Mozzik along with German producers Macloud and Miksu, who also handled the production. It was independently released as a single for digital download and streaming on 14 September 2018. An Albanian and German-language uptempo hip hop and R&B song, it contains Balkan elements. Inspired by Bonnie and Clyde, the song is lyrically about both rappers confessing that they are only after money. The accompanying music video was uploaded to YouTube in September 2018. Music critics generally received "Bonnie & Clyde" with favorable reviews, complimenting the music and lyrics as well as the rappers' collaboration. The song was a commercial success, reaching number two in both Austria and Switzerland, as well as number three in Germany. It has been also awarded gold certifications by the Austrian International Federation of the Phonographic Industry (IFPI Austria) and German Bundesverband Musikindustrie (BVMI).

== Background and composition ==
Prior to the release of "Bonnie & Clyde", Loredana signed a contract with the German subsidiary of Sony Music in September 2018 and announced the release of an upcoming single. Then, "Bonnie & Clyde" was made available for digital download and streaming on 14 September 2018. The single, with its title alluding to the American criminal couple Bonnie and Clyde, marked the first collaboration between the couple Loredana and Mozzik. The song was written by Loredana, Mozzik, Macloud (Laurin Auth) and Miksu (Joshua Allery), with the production handled by the latter two. Musically, "Bonnie & Clyde" is an uptempo hip hop and R&B-described song, which incorporates Balkan elements. Performed in German with some lyrics by Mozzik in Albanian, both rappers lyrically confess that they only are after the money.

== Reception and promotion ==
"Bonnie & Clyde" received mainly positive reviews upon its release. Martin Seebacher from Red Bull complimented the song's Balkan and uptempo sounds, stating that it is a "perfect" symbiosis of "classic and hip hop". Mira Weingart from the same website praised Mozzik's Albanian-language lyrics, labelling them as "smooth", and wrote that "even if you do not understand it, you want to bounce and party to it". Yma Nowak from Hiphop De found Loredana's rhyming techniques to be "catchy", while the staff of laut.de further described them as "simple". "Bonnie & Clyde" reached number two in both Austria and Switzerland, having since received a gold certification in the former country from the Austrian International Federation of the Phonographic Industry (IFPI Austria). In Germany, the single experienced similar success, peaking at number three on the Official German Charts, and received a gold certification there from the German Bundesverband Musikindustrie (BVMI). Loredana uploaded the music video for "Bonnie & Clyde" to her YouTube channel on 14 September 2018. Produced by Bilal Hadzic and Mohamed Elbouhlali, the video received 11 million YouTube views in less than a week.

== Credits and personnel ==
Credits adapted from Spotify.

- Loredana – songwriting, vocals
- Mozzik (Gramoz Aliu) – songwriting, vocals
- Macloud (Laurin Auth) – songwriting, producing
- Miksu (Joshua Allery) – songwriting, producing

== Track listing ==
- Digital download and streaming
1. "Bonnie & Clyde" – 2:55

== Charts ==
Chart performance for "Bonnie & Clyde"
Chart (2018)	Peak position
Austria (Ö3 Austria Top 40)	3
Germany (GfK)	3
Germany Digital (Germany Songs)	3
Switzerland (Schweizer Hitparade)	2
Switzerland Digital Song Sales (Billboard)	3

== Certifications ==
Certifications and sales for "Bonnie & Clyde"
Region	Certification	Certified units/sales
Austria (IFPI Austria)	Gold	15,000^{‡}
Germany (BVMI)	Gold	200,000^{‡}
^{‡} Sales+streaming figures based on certification alone.

== Release history ==
Release dates and formats for "Bonnie & Clyde"
Region	Date	Format(s)	Label	Ref.
Various	14 September 2018	Digital download; streaming	Independent	
