= Elvana Gjata discography =

- Studio albums: 3
- EPs: 3
- Singles: 67
- Singles as featured artist: 6

Albanian singer and songwriter Elvana Gjata has released three studio albums, three extended plays, 67 singles as a lead artist and six as a featured artist.

== Albums ==
=== Studio albums ===
List of studio albums, with details
Title	Album details
Mamës	Released: 7 February 2008; Label: Super Sonic; Format: CD, digital download
Afër dhe Larg	Released: 7 August 2011; Label: Threedots Production; Format: CD, digital download, streaming
Trilogji (Kapitulli I - GRADA)	Released: 13 June 2025; Label: LOUD.; Format: CD, digital download, streaming

=== Extended plays ===
List of extended plays, with details
Title	Album details
Acoustic Live Session	Released: 14 November 2014; Label: Threedots Productions; Format: Digital download, streaming
3	Released: 10 February 2018; Label: East Music Matters (EMM); Format: Digital download, streaming
Çelu	Released: 16 April 2021; Label: Loudcom Media, East Music Matters (EMM); Format: Digital download, streaming

== Singles ==
=== As lead artist ===
List of singles as lead artist, with selected chart positions
Title	Year	Peak chart positions						Album
Title	Year	ALB	CIS Air.	POL Air.	ROM Air. (Note: Uniunea Producătorilor de Fonograme din România began publishing charts in November 2021 and their charts are taken into consideration for Romanian peaks after the Airplay 100's cancellation in the same month.)	SWI	UKR Air.	Album
"Zjarri që ti ndez"	2005	*	—	—	—	—	—	Non-album singles
"Të kam xhan"	2005	*	—	—	—	—	—	Non-album singles
"Nushu ime"	2007	*	—	—	—	—	—	Mamës
"Vetëm zoti e di"	2007	*	—	—	—	—	—	Mamës
"Mamës"	2007	*	—	—	—	—	—	Mamës
"Ku jeton dashuria"	2008	*	—	—	—	—	—	Afër dhe Larg
"Vetës"	2008	*	—	—	—	—	—	Afër dhe Larg
"Nuk janë më"	2009	*	—	—	—	—	—	Afër dhe Larg
"Turn u On"	2009	*	—	—	—	—	—	Afër dhe Larg
"Hitech"	2009	*	—	—	—	—	—	Afër dhe Larg
"Dhe zemra ndal"	2009	*	—	—	—	—	—	Afër dhe Larg
"Ake ti zemër"	2010	*	—	—	—	—	—	Afër dhe Larg
"Mamani nejen"	2010	*	—	—	—	—	—	Afër dhe Larg
"Kudo që jam"	2011	*	—	—	—	—	—	Afër dhe Larg
"Me ty"	2011	*	—	—	—	—	—	Afër dhe Larg
"Afër dhe larg"	2011	*	—	—	—	—	—	Afër dhe Larg
"Gjaku im"	2012	*	—	—	—	—	—	Afër dhe Larg
"Beso" (featuring 2po2)	2013	*	—	—	—	—	—	Non-album singles
"Fake"	2013	*	—	—	—	—	—	Non-album singles
"Fake Remix" (featuring Kaos and PINT)	2014	*	—	—	—	—	—	Non-album singles
"1990" (featuring MC Kresha)	2014	*	—	—	—	—	—	Non-album singles
"Disco Disco" (featuring Kaos)	2014	*	—	—	—	—	—	Non-album singles
"Puthe"	2014	*	—	— (Note: "Puthe" peaked at 37 on Top – Dyskoteki chart, which shows the most popular songs in Polish clubs. Song did not chart on official Polish Top 100 Airplay.)	—	—	—	Non-album singles
"Kuq e zi je ti" (featuring Flori Mumajesi)	2015	*	—	—	—	—	—	Non-album singles
"Love me" (featuring Bruno)	2015	4	—	—	—	—	—	Non-album singles
"Njësoj"	2016	1	—	—	—	—	—	Non-album singles
"Lejla" (featuring Capital T and 2po2)	2016	1	—	—	—	—	—	Non-album singles
"Forever Is Over"	2017	1	—	—	—	—	—	Non-album singles
"Off Guard" (featuring Ty Dolla $ign)	2018	27	—	—	—	—	—	Non-album singles
"Ku Vajti"	2018	2	—	—	—	—	—	Non-album singles
"Mike" (with Ledri Vula featuring John Shehu)	2018	2	—	—	—	—	—	Non-album singles
"Tavolina e mërzisë"	2019	1	—	—	—	—	—	Non-album singles
"Fustani" (featuring Capital T)	2019	1	—	—	—	—	—	Non-album singles
"A m'don"	2019	2	—	—	—	—	—	Non-album singles
"Me tana"	2019	—	—	—	—	—	—	Non-album singles
"Thirr"	2021	1	—	—	—	—	—	Non-album singles
"Loti"	2021	1	—	—	—	55	—	Non-album singles
"E di" (featuring Yll Limani)	2021	1	—	—	—	—	—	Non-album singles
"Marre" (featuring Yll Limani)	2021	—	—	—	—	—	—	Non-album singles
"Papa" (with Sickotoy and Inna)	2021	—	—	—	18	—	169	Non-album singles
"Ska" (with Mozzik)	2022	3	—	—	—	33	—	Lamboziki
"Pow"	2022	3	—	—	—	98	—	Non-album singles
"Ex" (with Bardhi and DJ Gimi-O)	2022	—	—	—	—	19	—	Non-album singles
"Gajde" (with Dhurata Dora)	2022	1	—	—	—	11	—	Non-album singles
"Clap Clap" (with Gran Error and Antonia)	2022	1	121	32	8	—	180	Non-album singles
"Rrotullo" (with Dhurata Dora)	2023	3	—	—	—	—	—	Non-album singles
"Si na"	2023	1	—	—	—	—	—	Non-album singles
"Synin"	2023	2	—	—	—	—	—	Non-album singles
"Si na (Negativ Version)"	2023	5	—	—	—	—	—	Non-album singles
"Pak"	2023	6	—	—	—	—	—	Non-album singles
"Hana"	2024	—	—	—	—	—	—	Non-album singles
"Ku gjen më mirë"	2024	1	—	—	—	—	—	Non-album singles
"Bésame en Rio" (with Gran Error)	2024	2	—	—	61	—	—	Non-album singles
"No Love" (with Ledri Vula)	2024	1	—	—	—	36	—	Non-album singles
"Nihna" (with Dardan and Çelik Lipa)	2024	3	—	—	—	92	—	Non-album singles
"Shhh!" (with Ledri Vula)	2024	13	—	—	—	—	—	Non-album singles
"Gocat"	2024	5	—	—	—	—	—	Trilogji (Kapitulli I - GRADA)
"Karnaval"	2024	—	—	—	—	—	—	Non-album singles
"Grada"	2025	2	—	—	—	—	—	Trilogji (Kapitulli I - GRADA)
"Lumja Toka"	2025	2	—	—	—	15	—	Trilogji (Kapitulli I - GRADA)
"Knojna"	2025	2	—	—	—	—	—	Trilogji (Kapitulli I - GRADA)
"Ego"	2025	1	—	—	—	—	—	Non-album singles
"Sa të du" (with Irkenc Hyka)	2025	—	—	—	—	—	—	Non-album singles
"Moment" (with Stanaj)	2026	1	—	—	—	—	—	Non-album singles
"Si Sheqer"	2026	2	—	—	—	—	—	Non-album singles
"Closure" (with Alina Eremia)	2026	1	—	—	88	—	—	Non-album singles
"Po Du" (with Rilind Alimani)	2026	1	—	—	—	—	—	Non-album singles
"—" denotes a recording that did not chart or was not released in that territory.

=== As featured artist ===
List of singles as featured artist, with selected chart positions
Title	Year	Peak chart positions		Album
Title	Year	ALB	SWI	Album
"Të dy" (Tingulli 3nt featuring Elvana Gjata)	2007	*	—	Non-album single
"Shade" (Poo Bear featuring Elvana Gjata)	2018	57	—	Poo Bear Presents Bearthday Music
"Meine Liebe" (Ardian Bujupi featuring Elvana Gjata)	2019	16	73	Rahat
"Flakë" (Capital T featuring Elvana Gjata)	2021	1	—	Non-album single
"My All" (Noizy featuring Elvana Gjata)	2023	4	—	Alpha
"Vapa" (Kidda featuring Elvana Gjata and DJ Gimi-O)	2026	44	—	Non-album single
"—" denotes a recording that did not chart or was not released in that territory.

== Other charted songs ==
List of other charted songs, with selected chart positions
Title	Year	Peak chart positions	Album
Title	Year	ALB	Album
"Më fal"	2018	1	3
"Ti Shqipëri më jep nder"	2018	3	3
"Veç një pikë"	2018	5	3
"Xheloz"	2018	1	3
"Pa dashuri"	2019	1	Non-album single
"A po vjen"	2021	19	Çelu
"Drandofilat"	2021	1	Çelu
"Kunadhe"	2021	1	Çelu
"Kur jemi dasht"	2021	16	Çelu
"Mos u ngut"	2021	1	Çelu
"Shenjë"	2025	1	TRILOGJI (Kapitulli I - GRADA)
"Ti"	2025	2	TRILOGJI (Kapitulli I - GRADA)
"Të dua"	2025	6	TRILOGJI (Kapitulli I - GRADA)
"Mos harro"	2025	11	TRILOGJI (Kapitulli I - GRADA)
"Sicko"	2025	30	TRILOGJI (Kapitulli I - GRADA)
"I Like It"	2025	47	TRILOGJI (Kapitulli I - GRADA)
"—" denotes a recording that did not chart or was not released in that territory.

== Guest appearances ==
List of guest appearances, with selected chart positions
Title	Year	Peak chart positions		Album
Title	Year	ALB	SWI	Album
"Stuhi mbi oqean" (MC Kresha and Lyrical Son featuring Elvana Gjata)	2022	3	—	Muzikë e Alltisë
"Luj" (Dhurata Dora featuring Elvana Gjata)	2023	19	69	Dhurata
"—" denotes a recording that did not chart or was not released in that territory.
