= List of songs recorded by Elvana Gjata =

Songs recorded by Albanian singer-songwriter

This article features the list of songs recorded by Albanian singer and songwriter Elvana Gjata. For the singer's records on the charts, see Elvana Gjata discography.

== Songs ==
Song	Writer(s)	Album(s)	Year	Ref.
"1990"	Flori Mumajesi	Non-album single	2014	
"A m'don"	Arber Zeqo, Elvana Gjata	Non-album single	2019	
"A po vjen"	Elvana Gjata	Çelu	2021	
"Afër dhe larg"	Flori Mumajesi	Afër dhe larg	2011	
"A ke ti zemër"	Unknown	Non-album single	2010	
"Ani ani"	Unknown	Mamës	2008	
"Anonim"	Elvana Gjata, Flori Mumajesi	Acoustic Live Session	2014	
"As ti"	Flori Mumajesi	Acoustic Live Session	2014	
"Beso"	Non-album single	2013	2014	
"Dancehall"	Unknown	Afër dhe larg	2011	
"Dhe zemra ndal"	Ardit Roshi	Afër dhe larg	2009	
"Disco Disco" (featuring Kaos)	Unknown	Non-album single	2014	
"Drandofilat"	Elvana Gjata	Çelu	2021	
"E di" (featuring Yll Limani)	Elvana Gjata, Yll Limani	Non-album single	2021	
"Fake"	Unknown	Non-album single	2013	
"Fake Remix" (featuring Kaos and P.I.N.T)	Festim Arifi, Flori Mumajesi, Kreshnik Fazliu, Lumi Berisha, Bardhi	Non-album single	2013	
"Festojmë"	Pirro Çako	3	2018	
"Forever Is Over"	Elvana Gjata, David Guetta, Giorgio Tuinfort, Jason Boyd	Non-album single	2017	
"Fustani" (featuring Capital T)	Elvana Gjata, Trim Ademi	Non-album single	2019	
"Gjaku im"	Dalina Buzi	Afër dhe larg	2012	
"Gjërat kanë ndryshuar"	Elvana Gjata, Pirro Çako	3	2018	
"Hitech"	Flori Mumajesi	Non-album single	2009	
"Jeta ime"	Elvana Gjata	Çelu	2021	
"Ku jeton dashuria"	Unknown	Afër dhe larg	2008	
"Ku Vajti"	Arbër Gjikolli, Elvana Gjata	Non-album single	2018	
"Kudo që jam"	Unknown	Afër dhe larg	2011	
"Kunadhe"	Elvana Gjata	Çelu	2021	
"Kuq e zi je ti" (featuring Flori Mumajesi)	Flori Mumajesi	Non-album single	2015	
"Kur jemi dasht"	Elvana Gjata	Çelu	2021	
"Lejla" (featuring Capital T and 2po2)	Besnik Canolli, Elvana Gjata, Flori Mumajesi, Trim Ademi	Non-album single	2016	
"Loti"	Elvana Gjata	Non-album single	2021	
"Love me" (featuring Bruno)	Flori Mumajesi	Non-album single	2015	
"Mamani nejen" (featuring Fugaa)	Flori Mumajesi	Afër dhe larg	2010	
"Mamës"	Flori Mumajesi	Mamës	2008	
"Marre" (featuring Yll Limani)	Elvana Gjata, Yll Limani	Non-album single	2021	
"Meine Liebe"	Ardian Bujupi, Dominik Lange, Elvana Gjata	Rahat	2019	
"Me tana"	Elvana Gjata	Non-album single	2019	
"Mëngjesi kësaj here"	Flori Mumajesi	Acoustic Live Session	2014	
"Me ty"	Flori Mumajesi	Afër dhe larg	2011	
"Më fal"	Elvana Gjata	3	2018	
"Mike" (with Ledri Vula featuring John Shehu)	Arber Zeqo, Elvana Gjata, John Shehu, Ledri Vula	Non-album single	2018	
"Mos u fsheh"	Unknown	Mamës	2008	
"Njësoj"	Flori Mumajesi	Non-album single	2016	
"Nuk janë më"	Unknown	Afër dhe larg	2009	
"Nushu ime"	Unknown	Mamës	2008	
"Off Guard"	Dominic Jordan, Elvana Gjata, Jimmy Giannos, Jason Boyd, Tyrone William Griffin	Non-album single	2018	
"Pa dashuri"	Elvana Gjata	Non-album single	2019	
"Pak nga pak"	Flori Mumajesi	Acoustic Live Session	2014	
"Papa" (with Sickotoy and Inna)	Elvana Gjata, Adelina Stinga, Alex Cotoi, Alexandra Apostoleanu	Non-album single	2021	
"Puthe"	Elvana Gjata, Flori Mumajesi	Non-album single	2014	
"Sex on the beach"	Unknown	Afër dhe larg	2011	
"Shade" (featuring Poo Bear)	Alejandro Ramirez, Elvana Gjata, Jason Boyd	"Poo Bear Presents Bearthday Music"	2018	
"Si une"	Flori Mumajesi	Acoustic Live Session	2014	
"Tavolina e mërzisë"	Aida Baraku	Non-album single	2019	
"Të dy" (featuring Tingulli 3nt)	Unknown	Mamës	2007	
"Thirr"	Elvana Gjata	Non-album single	2021	
"Ti je"	Unknown	Afër dhe larg	2011	
"Turn u On"	Unknown	Afër dhe larg	2011	
"Veç një pikë"	Elvana Gjata, Pirro Çako	3	2018	
"Vetës"	Unknown	Afër dhe larg	2008	
"Vetëm ty të kam"	Unknown	Mamës	2008	
"Vetëm zoti e di"	Unknown	Mamës	2008	
"Xheloz"	Elvana Gjata, Pirro Çako	3	2018	
"Zjarri që ti ndez"	Unknown	Non-album single	2005	
