= Elvana Gjata videography =

This article features the videography of Albanian singer Elvana Gjata. Her videography includes numerous music video as well as several appearances in films, television shows and television commercials.

== Music videos ==
=== As lead artist ===
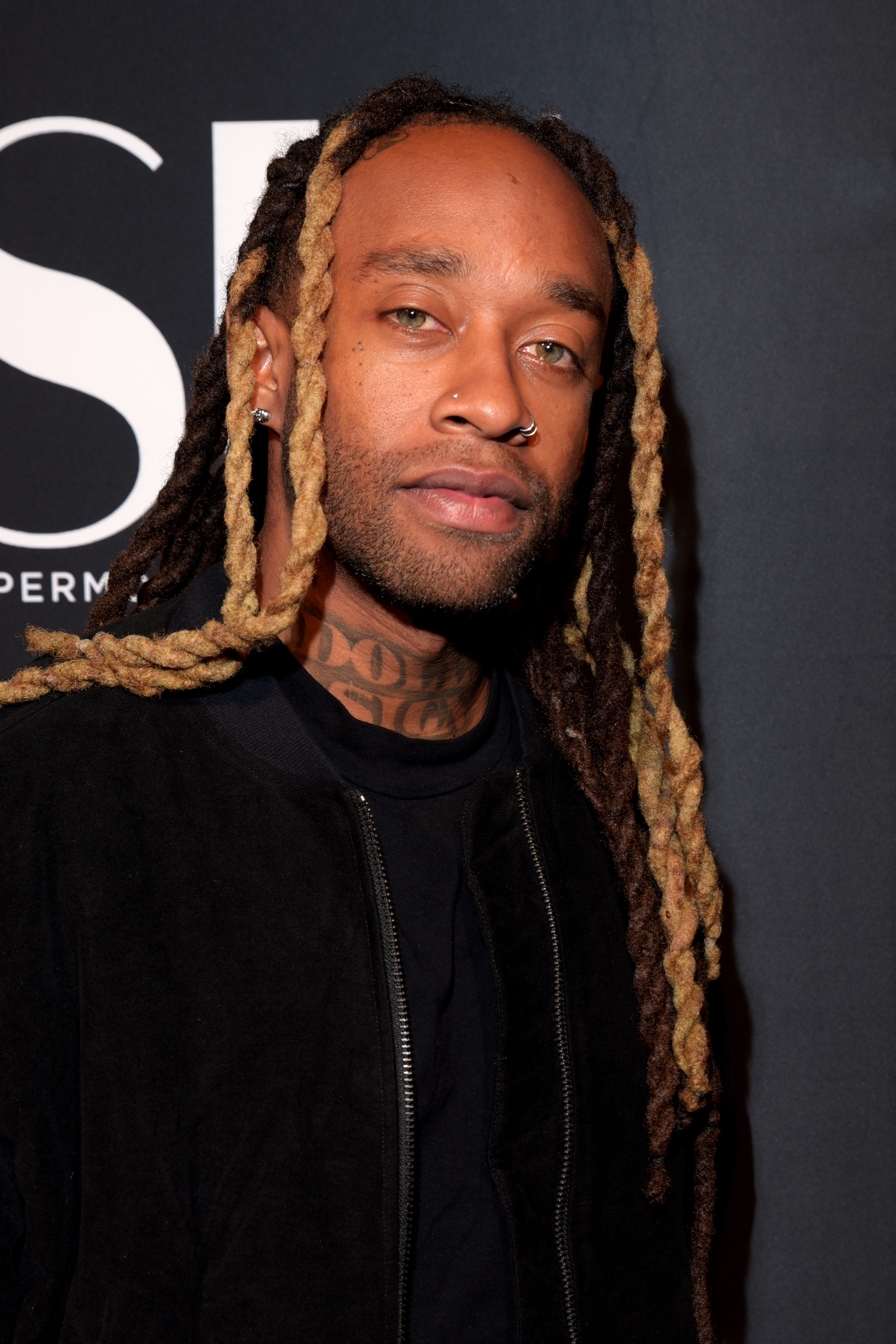
Ty Dolla Sign appears in the music video for "Off Guard".

Title	Year	Album	Director(s)	Ref.
"Nuk Janë Më"	2009	Afër dhe Larg	Unknown	
"Vetës"	2009	Afër dhe Larg	Unknown	
"Hitech"	2009	Non-album single	Unknown	
"A Ke Ti Zemër"	2010	Afër dhe Larg	Unknown	
"Mamani nejen" feat. Fugaa	2010	Afër dhe Larg	Unknown	
"Kudo Që Jam"	2011	Afër dhe Larg	Unknown	
"Gjaku im"	2012	Afër dhe Larg	Unknown	
"Si Une"	2013	Acoustic Live Session EP	Flori Mumajesi	
"Anonim"	2013	Acoustic Live Session EP	Flori Mumajesi	
"Pak Nga Pak"	2013	Acoustic Live Session EP	Flori Mumajesi	
"Mëngjesi Kësaj Here"	2013	Acoustic Live Session EP	Flori Mumajesi	
"As Ti"	2013	Acoustic Live Session EP	Flori Mumajesi	
"Je Ti"	2014	Non-album single	Unknown	
"Fake" feat. Kaos & P.i.n.t	2014	Non-album single	Unknown	
"Puthe"	2014	Non-album single	Unknown	
"1990" feat. MC Kresha	2014	Non-album single	Unknown	
"Disco Disco" feat. KAOS	2014	Non-album single	Unknown	
"Kuq E Zi Je Ti" feat. Flori Mumajesi	2014	2015	Unknown	
"Love Me" feat. Bruno	—	2015	Mobile Phone Video	
"Njesoj"	2016	Non-album single	Unknown	
"Lejla" feat. Capital T & 2po2	2016	Non-album single	Unknown	
"Forever Is Over"	2017	Non-album single	Richard Paris Wilson	
"Festojmë"	2018	3 EP	Albi Çifligu	
"Gjërat Kanë Ndryshuar"	2018	3 EP	Albi Çifligu	
"Veç Një Pikë"	2018	3 EP	Albi Çifligu	
"Më Fal"	2018	3 EP	Albi Çifligu	
"Ti Shqipëri Më Jep Nder"	2018	3 EP	Albi Çifligu	
"Xheloz"	2018	3 EP	Albi Çifligu	
"Off Guard" feat. Ty Dolla Sign	2018	Non-album single	Ethan Lader	
"Ku Vajti"	2018	Non-album single	Unknown	
"Mike" feat. Ledri Vula & John Shahu	2018	Non-album single	Besian Durmishi	
"Tavolina e mërzisë"	2019	Non-album single	Besian Durmishi	
"Fustani" feat. Capital T	2019	Non-album single	Emir Khalilzadeh	
"A M'don"	2019	Non-album single	Emir Khalilzadeh	
"A po vjen"	2021	Çelu	Blendi Kalivaçi	
"Drandofilat"	2021	Çelu	Blendi Kalivaçi	
"Jeta ime"	2021	Çelu	Blendi Kalivaçi	
"Kur jemi dasht"	2021	Çelu	Blendi Kalivaçi	
"Kunadhe"	2021	Çelu	Blendi Kalivaçi	
"Mos u ngut"	2021	Çelu	Blendi Kalivaçi	

=== As featured artist ===
Title	Year	Album	Director(s)	Ref.
"Shade" Poo Bear featuring Elvana Gjata	2018	Poo Bear Presents Bearthday Music	Unknown	
"Meine Liebe" Ardian Bujupi featuring Elvana Gjata	2019	Rahat	Hasan Kuyucu	

== Television ==
Title	Year	Role	Notes	Ref.
Apartamenti 2XL	2011	Herself	Season 2	
TEB Starcard	2011	Herself	Commercial	
Dancing with the Stars Albania	2012	Herself	Season 2	
X Factor Albania	2013	Herself	Season 2	
Albtelecom	2014	Herself	Commercial	
6 Ditë Pa Ermalin	2014	Herself	Special Guest	
Xing Me Ermalin	2018	Herself	Special Guest	
The Voice Kids Albania	2018	Herself	Season 2	

== Films ==
Title	Year	Role	Director(s)	Ref.
2 Gisht Mjaltë	2019	Ema	Ermal Mamaqi; Emir Khalilzadeh	
