= Capital T discography =

- Studio albums: 4
- Singles: 70
- Singles as featured artist: 13
- Mixtapes: 2

The Kosovar rapper Capital T has released four studio albums, two mixtapes, 70 singles as a lead artist and 13 as a featured artist.

== Albums ==
=== Studio albums ===
| Title | Details |
|---|---|
| Replay | Released: 2010; Label: Authentic Entertainment; Format: CD, digital download |
| Kapo | Released: 30 June 2012; Label: Authentic Entertainment; Format: Digital download, streaming |
| Skulpturë | Released: 1 October 2020; Label: Onima; Format: Digital download, streaming |
| Heartbroken Kids | Released: 24 December 2021; Label: Folé Publishing; Format: Digital download, streaming |

=== Mixtapes ===
| Title | Details | Peak chart positions |
| Title | Details | SWI |
|---|---|---|
| Slumdog Millionaire | Released: 1 March 2015; Label: Authentic Entertainment; Format: Digital download, streaming | |
| Winter Is Here | Released: 27 October 2017; Label: Authentic Entertainment, Onima; Format: Digital download, streaming | 69 |

== Singles ==
=== As lead artist ===
==== 2000s ====
List of singles in the 2000s decade
| Title | Year | Album |
|---|---|---|
| "Shopping" | 2008 | Replay |
| "1 Mëngjes" | 2008 | Replay |
| "Shum nalt" (featuring 2po2 and Dafina Zeqiri) | 2009 | Replay |
| "Supersweet" | 2009 | Replay |

==== 2010s ====
List of singles in the 2010s decade, with selected chart positions
| Title | Year | Peak chart positions | | Album |
| Title | Year | ALB | SWI | Album |
|---|---|---|---|---|
| "Ma e mira" | 2010 | —N/a | — | Replay |
| "Make a wish" | 2011 | —N/a | — | Replay |
| "Ku jon paret" | 2011 | —N/a | — | Replay |
| "U bo von" | 2011 | —N/a | — | Kapo |
| "Shopping" | 2012 | —N/a | — | Kapo |
| "Karma" | 2012 | —N/a | — | Kapo |
| "As Gucci as Louis" (featuring 2po2) | 2012 | —N/a | — | Kapo |
| "Zero" | 2013 | —N/a | — | Kapo |
| "Dit e re" | 2013 | —N/a | — | Kapo |
| "Hapat e mi" (featuring Vedat Ademi) | 2014 | —N/a | — | SMD |
| "Ballin" (featuring MC Kresha) | 2014 | —N/a | — | SMD |
| "Posh" (featuring 2po2) | 2014 | —N/a | — | Non-album single |
| "Kur fol zemra" | 2014 | —N/a | — | Non-album single |
| "Qka don ajo" (featuring Gent Fatali) | 2015 | —N/a | — | Non-album single |
| "Pare Pare" | 2015 | —N/a | — | Non-album single |
| "Hitman" | 2016 | 1 | — | Non-album single |
| "Thirrëm n telefon" (featuring Granit Derguti) | 2016 | 18 | — | Non-album single |
| "Bongo" (featuring Dhurata Dora) | 2016 | 3 | — | Non-album single |
| "Koka Kola" | 2016 | — | — | Non-album single |
| "C'est la guerre" (featuring Dj Nika & Macro) | 2017 | 5 | — | Non-album single |
| "Uno" | 2017 | 1 | — | Winter Is Here |
| "Pa cenzur" (featuring Lyrical Son & Vig Poppa) | 2017 | 12 | — | Winter Is Here |
| "Numra" (featuring MC Kresha) | 2017 | 3 | — | Winter Is Here |
| "Pse po ma lun lojen" | 2017 | 5 | — | Winter Is Here |
| "Yoko Ono" | 2018 | — | — | Winter Is Here |
| "Pasha jetën" (featuring Majk) | 2018 | 3 | — | Non-album single |
| "O ma" | 2018 | 26 | — | Non-album single |
| "Bomba" | 2018 | 35 | — | Non-album single |
| "Filma" | 2018 | 36 | — | Non-album single |
| "Kujtime" | 2019 | 22 | — | Non-album single |
| "Hookah" | 2019 | 37 | — | Non-album single |
| "200 ditë" (featuring TNT) | 2019 | 24 | — | Non-album single |
| "Syt e tu" | 2019 | — | — | Non-album single |
| "Akull" | 2019 | 2 | 64 | Non-album single |
| "Yalla" (featuring Capital Bra) | 2019 | — | — | Non-album single |
"—" denotes a recording that did not chart or was not released in that territory.

==== 2020s ====
List of singles in the 2020s decade, with selected chart positions
| Title | Year | Peak chart positions | | Album |
| Title | Year | ALB | SWI | Album |
|---|---|---|---|---|
| "600Ps" | 2020 | 2 | — | Skulpturë |
| "Je t'aim" | 2020 | 14 | — | Skulpturë |
| "Flex" | 2020 | — | — | Skulpturë |
| "Flawless" | 2020 | — | — | Skulpturë |
| "DMP" (with Ledri Vula) | 2020 | — | 85 | Skulpturë |
| "C'est la vie" | 2020 | 1 | — | Skulpturë |
| "Braziliane" | 2020 | 3 | — | Skulpturë |
| "Bisha" (featuring Vig Poppa) | 2020 | — | — | Skulpturë |
| "Fjalt e nanës" | 2020 | 1 | — | Skulpturë |
| "Diego" | 2021 | 1 | — | Non-album single |
| "Rrushe" | 2021 | 1 | — | Non-album single |
| "Magji" (with Kidda) | 2021 | 2 | — | Non-album single |
| "Buzëqeshje" | 2021 | — | — | Non-album single |
| "Valle" | 2021 | 1 | — | Non-album single |
| "Flakë" | 2021 | 1 | — | Non-album single |
| "Plan" | 2021 | 5 | — | Heartbroken Kids |
| "Nashta" | 2021 | 22 | — | Heartbroken Kids |
| "Heku qafë" (featuring MC Kresha) | 2021 | 1 | — | Heartbroken Kids |
| "Përjetësisht" | 2022 | — | — | Heartbroken Kids |
| "Për ty" | 2022 | — | — | Heartbroken Kids |
| "Për dashni" | 2022 | — | — | Heartbroken Kids |
| "Një natë" (with Alban Skënderaj) | 2022 | — | — | Non-album single |
| "Dukat" | 2022 | — | — | Non-album single |
| "Habibi" (with Anxhela Peristeri and Mandi) | 2022 | — | — | Non-album single |
| "Hera e fundit" | 2022 | — | — | Non-album single |
| "Acar" (with Elinel) | 2023-2024 | — | — | Non-album single |
| "Zani i popullit" | 2023-2024 | — | — | Non-album single |
| "Back on road" | 2023-2024 | — | — | Non-album single |
| "Xheloze" (with Rzon) | 2023-2024 | — | — | Who is Rzon |
| "Yjet dalin natën" (with Ledri Vula and Majk) | 2023-2024 | — | — | Non-album single |
| "Jena 2" (with Samanta Karavella) | 2023-2024 | — | — | Non-album single |
| — | — | Non-album single | | |
| " Albania"(with Cricket | "—" denotes a recording that did not chart or was not released in that territory. | Non-album single | | |

=== As featured artist ===
| Title | Year | Peak chart positions | | | | Album |
| Title | Year | ALB | AUT | GER | SWI | Album |
|---|---|---|---|---|---|---|
| "Një Ëndër" | 2013 | —N/a | — | — | — | Non-album single |
| "Lejla" | 2016 | 1 | — | — | — | Non-album single |
| "Kujt pi kallxon" | 2016 | 29 | — | — | — | 2020 |
| "Hatixhe" | 2017 | 3 | — | — | — | Non-album single |
| "Andiamo" | 2017 | 1 | — | — | — | Non-album single |
| "Across the World" | 2018 | — | — | — | — | Non-album single |
| "Take a shot" | 2018 | 39 | — | — | — | Non-album single |
| "Wann dann" (Capital Bra featuring Capital T) | 2018 | — | 14 | 18 | 15 | Berlin lebt |
| "Mercy" | 2019 | — | — | — | — | Non-album single |
| "Borëbardha" (2po2 featuring Capital T) | 2019 | 80 | — | — | — | Non-album single |
| "Fustani" (Elvana Gjata featuring Capital T) | 2019 | 1 | — | — | — | Non-album single |
| "Hala" (Majk featuring Capital T) | 2019 | 1 | — | — | — | Non-album single |
"—" denotes a recording that did not chart or was not released in that territory.
