= List of awards and nominations received by Elvana Gjata =

This article features the list of awards and nominations received by Albanian pop and R&B singer Elvana Gjata.

== Balkan Music Awards ==
The Balkan Music Awards is an annual music award ceremony organised by Balkanika Music Television celebrating the most successful in music from the Balkan countries. Gjata won two out of four nominations, including Music Video of the Year and Best Song in the Balkans from Albania for 2012 for "Afër dhe Larg".

Year	Nominee / work	Award	Result
2012	"Afër dhe Larg"	Best Music Video in the Balkans	Won
2012	"Afër dhe Larg"	Best Song in the Balkans from Albania	Won
2011	"Mamani Nejen" (feat. Fugaa)	Best Song in the Balkans from Albania	Nominated
2010	"Turn U On"	Best Song in the Balkans from Albania	Nominated

== Dancing with the Stars ==
Year	Nominee / work	Award	Result
2012	"Elvana Gjata"	First Prize	Won

== Kënga Magjike ==
Kënga Magjike is an annual competition, broadcasting every year since its debut in 1999, and the second longest-running television competition in Albania. Gjata participated two times in the competition, first in 2007 and after two years in 2009, where she finished in the third and second place, respectively.

Year	Nominee / work	Award	Result
2007	"Ku Jeton Dashuria"	Discography Award	Won
2007	"Ku Jeton Dashuria"	Third Place	Won
2009	"Dhe Zemra Ndal"	Internet Award	Won
2009	"Dhe Zemra Ndal"	Second Place	Won

== Prive Klan Kosova ==
Year	Nominee / work	Award	Result
2015	"Herself"	Person of The Year	Won

== Top Music Awards ==
Year	Nominee / work	Award	Result
2016	"Love me (feat.Bruno)"	My Music Hit of the Year	Nominated
2016	"Love me (feat.Bruno)"	Collaboration of the Year	Nominated
2016	"Love me (feat.Bruno)"	Song of the Year	Nominated
2016	"Elvana Gjata"	Female Artist of the Year	Nominated

== Top Fest ==
Year	Nominee / work	Award	Result
2011	"Me Ty"	Best Female	Won
2011	"Me Ty"	First Prize	Won

== Videofest Awards ==
Year	Nominee / work	Award	Result
2014	"Disco Disco" (feat. KAOS)	Best Duo	Nominated
2014	"Disco Disco" (feat. KAOS)	Best Dance Music Video	Nominated
2013	"Beso" (feat. 2Po2)	Music Video of the Year	Nominated
2013	"Beso" (feat. 2Po2)	Best Direction	Nominated
2013	"Beso" (feat. 2Po2)	Best R&B Music Video	Won
2013	"Beso" (feat. 2Po2)	Best Duo	Won
2012	"Afer dhe Larg"	Best Female Video	Nominated
2012	"Afer dhe Larg"	Best Dance Music Video	Nominated
2012	"Afer dhe Larg"	Best Styling	Nominated
2011	"Mamani Nejen" (feat. Fugaa)	Music Video of the Year	Nominated
2011	"Mamani Nejen" (feat. Fugaa)	Best R&B Music Video	Nominated
2010	"Hitech"	Best Female Video	Nominated
2010	"Hitech"	Best R&B Music Video	Nominated
2010	"Hitech"	Best Special Effects	Won
2009	"Nuk Janë Më"	Music Video of the Year	Nominated
2009	"Nuk Janë Më"	Best Female Video	Won
2009	"Nuk Janë Më"	Best Direction	Nominated
2009	"Nuk Janë Më"	Best Editing	Nominated
2009	"Nuk Janë Më"	Best Special Effects	Nominated
2009	"Vetes"	Best Pop Music Video	Nominated
2008	"Mamës"	Music Video of the Year	Nominated
2008	"Mamës"	Best Female Video	Nominated
2008	"Mamës"	Best R&B Music Video	Won
2008	"Mamës"	Best Direction	Nominated
2007	"Të Dy" (with Tingulli 3nt)	Best Rap/Hip-Hop Video	Won

== Zhurma Show Awards ==
Year	Nominee / work	Award	Result
2006	"T2(feat.Tingulli 3nt)"	Best Hip Hop & R&B	Won
2009	"Turn U On"	Best Dance Song	Nominated
2010	"A Ke Ti Zemër"	Best Female Dance Artist	Nominated
2010	"A Ke Ti Zemër"	Best Female	Nominated
2011	"Afër dhe larg"	Best Song	Nominated
2011	"Afër dhe larg"	Best Dance	Nominated
2013	"Beso (feat. 2Po2)"	Best Performance	Nominated
2013	"Beso (feat. 2Po2)"	Best Video	Nominated
2015	"Love me (feat.Bruno)"	Best Pop	Won
2015	"Love me (feat.Bruno)"	Best Song	Nominated
2016	"Njesoj"	Best Pop	Nominated
