= Ex (Elvana Gjata, DJ Gimi-O and Bardhi song) =

2022 single by Elvana Gjata, DJ Gimi-O and Bardhi

Single by Elvana Gjata, DJ Gimi-O and Bardhi
- Language: Albanian
- Released: 25 February 2022
- Genre: Pop
- Length: 3:21
- Label: East Music Matters; Loudcom Media
- Songwriters: Bardhi; Çelik Lipa; DJ Gimi-O; Elvana Gjata
- Producers: Çelik Lipa; DJ Gimi-O

Elvana Gjata singles chronology
"Pow" (2022)	"Ex" (2022)	"Gajde" (2022)

DJ Gimi-O singles chronology
"Ti mor djal" (2021)	"Ex" (2022)	"O Rakia" (2022)

Bardhi singles chronology
"Engjulli im" (2022)	"Ex" (2022)	"Hayat" (2022)

Alternative cover
- First edition cover artwork

Music video
- "Ex" on YouTube

"Ex" (stylised in all caps) is a song by Albanian singer and songwriter Elvana Gjata, German-Albanian disc jockey DJ Gimi-O and Macedonian rapper Bardhi. The song was written by Gjata, Bardhi, DJ Gimi-O and Çelik Lipa, with production from the latter two. Loudcom Media under exclusive license from East Music Matters distributed it as a single for digital download and streaming on 24 February 2022. An uptempo Balkan and Mediterranean-influenced Albanian pop love song, its Albanian-language lyrics reflect the difficulties and hardships faced in getting over a failed relationship.

Upon release, several music critics applauded the composition and production of "Ex" as well as its music video. Commercially, the song reached number 19 in Switzerland and number 20 on the Billboard Switzerland Songs chart. Featuring a message of embracing the beginning of summer, an accompanying colorful music video was filmed in Tirana, Albania, and premiered on Gjata's YouTube channel on 16 March 2022.

== Background and composition ==
"Ex"
A 23-second sample of "Ex", an uptempo pop love song, featuring vocals from Gjata and Bardhi. Its lyrics reflect the difficulties and hardships of a failed relationship.

Preceded by a preview two days prior on 22 February, Elvana Gjata announced her first collaboration with Bardhi and DJ Gimi-O on her Instagram account, revealing the cover art and the single's availability on digital download and streaming formats on 24 February 2022 at 23:59 (CET). The single's initial cover art depicted the muppet character Kermit the Frog holding a wine bottle while lying on ground. Lasting three minutes and 21 seconds, "Ex" was distributed as a single by Loudcom Media under exclusive license from East Music Matters in various countries on 25 February 2022.

"Ex" was written by Gjata and Bardhi along with DJ Gimi-O and Çelik Lipa, who also produced the song. Musically, "Ex" is an upbeat tempo Balkan and Mediterranean-infused Albanian pop love song. The song's production was noted as "modern" and "pleasant", while incorporating oriental drums and a Middle Eastern-styled beat. The Albanian-language lyrics focus on the feelings of heartbreak, loss, misery, pain and rejection, making references to the difficulties and hardships faced in getting over a failed relationship.

== Reception ==
Upon release, "Ex" was met with generally positive reviews from selected music critics. An author from Illyrian Pirates attended to designate "Ex" as a "great" composition, with the lyrics displaying the "harsh realities and unpleasantness" of a separation process. Labeling the song as an "anomaly of music", the author continued writing that "[it's] friendly to both a Balkan and Western audience". An editor from Dosja further presumed the lyrics to be a dedication to Gjata's former partner.

Commercially, "Ex" reached number 19 on the Swiss Singles Chart for the issue date of 6 March 2022. In February 2022, American magazine Billboard launched Switzerland Songs, a digital download and streaming-based chart for Switzerland, on which "Ex" reached number 20 for the week ending 2 April 2022. From February to March 2022, the song also trended on the Swiss Streaming, iTunes and Spotify charts.

== Music video ==
To promote "Ex", a music video was uploaded to Gjata's official YouTube channel on 16 March 2022 at 16:03 (CET). The three-minute long video was filmed in a traditionally-described mansion in Tirana, Albania. It was produced by Adea Kelmendi and directed by Besian Durmishi of Supercut Studio, who had also directed the videos for Gjata's previous singles, "Mike" (2018) and "Tavolina e mërzisë" (2019). Arianit Gjonbalaj was further hired as the director of photography, while the hair and make-up were done by Kaci and Sellma, respectively, and the outfits selected by Andi Lekaj and Valdrin Sahiti.

From Illyrian Pirates, the writer had an overall positive perception towards the music video, labelling it as a "colorful 90's-inspired" video as well as an "enchanting private celebration with the artists embracing the beginning of summer". They further confessed that "[it] might be simulating what you would feel like if you drank too much and in the end realizes that it does not get better". On similar note, an editor of Gazeta Metro highlighted the video as "fantastic", while writing for Lajmi, the author noted "colorful" visuals, creating a "summer" atmosphere. The music video appeared on the global YouTube Top 100 chart and garnered 10 million views in two weeks on the platform.

== Credits and personnel ==
Credits adapted from Spotify and YouTube.

Vocal credits

- Elvana Gjata – lead vocals
- Bardhi – lead vocals

Technical credits

- Elvana Gjata – songwriting
- DJ Gimi-O – producing, songwriting
- Bardhi – songwriting
- Çelik Lipa – producing, songwriting

Visual credits

- Adea Kelmendi – producing
- Agnesa Kelmendi – producing
- Andi Lekaj – styling
- Arenc Kasharaj – camera assisting
- Arianit Gjonbalaj – photo directing
- Besian Durmishi – video directing
- Elvin Minaj – scenography
- Kaci – hair styling
- Sellma – make-up
- Valdrin Sahiti – styling

== Charts ==
Chart performance for "Ex"
Chart (2022)	Peak position
Switzerland (Schweizer Hitparade)	19
Switzerland Songs (Billboard)	20

== Release history ==
Release dates and formats for "Ex"
Region	Date	Format(s)	Label(s)	Ref.
Various	25 February 2022	Digital download; streaming	EMM; Loudcom Media	
