= Bardhi (rapper) =

Macedonian rapper (born 1997)

- Born: Bardhul Idrizi; 25 December 1997 (age 28); Kumanovo, Republic of Macedonia
- Occupation: Rapper
- Years active: 2018 – present
- Musical career
- Genre: Hip hop
- Label: SBS

Bardhul Idrizi (Albanian: [baɾˈðul iˈdɾizi]; born 25 December 1997), known mononymously as Bardhi, is a Macedonian rapper who predominantly raps in Albanian. He attracted widespread attention in the Albanian-speaking Balkans upon the release of his breakthrough single, "Betohemi", which eventually peaked atop the Albanian chart.

== Life and career ==
Bardhul Idrizi was born on 25 December 1997 into an ethnic Albanian family in the city of Kumanovo, Republic of Macedonia (present-day North Macedonia). Bardhi first gained national attention in the Albanian-speaking Balkans in October 2020, with the release of his single, "Betohemi". It was a commercial success, reaching number one in Albania for several consecutive weeks. Bardhi's chart success continued into November 2020 with his follow-up "Interes", which debuted at number one in the Albanian Top 100, upon its release. The rapper's debut studio album, Trëndafil, premiered on 9 November 2021. 14 singles were released from the record in the span of a year, seven of them to commercial success. "Do të doja" and "Diva" peaked at number six, respectively, while "Copë Copë", a collaboration with Kosovo-Albanian rapper Ledri Vula, reached the top five in Albania.

== Discography ==
=== Albums ===
==== Studio albums ====
- Trëndafil (2021)

==== Extended plays ====
- 21 (2019)

=== Singles ===
==== As lead artist ====
List of singles as lead artist, with selected chart positions
Title	Year	Peak chart positions		Album
Title	Year	ALB	SWI	Album
"Roli & Gucci"	2018	—	—	Non-album single
"SMK"	2018	—	—	Non-album single
"Pasha rrugt"	2018	—	—	Non-album single
"Roli & Gucci"	2019	—	—	Non-album single
"Familia"	2019	—	—	Non-album single
"Beb"	2019	—	—	Non-album single
"Paranoya"	2020	42	—	Non-album single
"Avash Avash"	2020	—	—	Non-album single
"Betohemi"	2020	1	—	Non-album single
"Interes" (with Eren Can)	2020	1	—	Non-album single
"Du & Ich" (with Dj Gimi-O)	2020	—	—	Non-album single
"Uno"	2021	—	—	Non-album single
"Do të doja"	2021	6	—	Non-album single
"Betohemi" (with Çelik Lipa)	2021	—	—	Non-album single
"Xhelozia"	2021	—	—	Non-album single
"Lot"	2021	40	—	Non-album single
"Diva"	2021	6	—	Non-album single
"Pa cent" (with Nush)	2021	42	—	Non-album single
"Qef" (with Lumi B)	2021	21	—	Non-album single
"Emanuela" (with Alketa)	2021	—	—	Non-album single
"A je?"	2021	34	—	Trëndafil
"Jeta jem" (with Azet)	2021	—	—	Trëndafil
"Sa mirë po dokesh" (with Eaz and Xen)	2021	—	—	Trëndafil
"Zemrën" (featuring Gjesti)	2021	—	—	Trëndafil
"Copë Copë" (featuring Ledri Vula)	2021	5	—	Trëndafil
"Ruf mich an" (featuring Belah)	2021	—	—	Trëndafil
"Ajo po don" (with Ensam)	2021	—	—	Non-album single
"Engjulli im"	2022	33	—	Non-album single
"Ex" (with Elvana Gjata and DJ Gimi-O)	2022	—	19	Non-album single
"Hayat" (featuring Azet)	2022	—	—	Non-album single
"Rakia" (featuring DJ Gimi-O)	2022	—	63	Non-album single
"Ama" (with Majk)	2022	—	—	Non-album single
"Mama Mia" (with Shkurte Gashi and Nora Istrefi)	2022	—	—	Non-album single
"Ola Bonita" (with Belah)	2022	—	—	Non-album single
"Mi Amor" (with Alketa Turkaj)	2022	—	—	Non-album single
"Zhytem"	2022	42	—	Non-album single
"Prap"	2022	42	—	Non-album single
"Katile" (with Aida Doçi and Florian Tufallari)	2022	—	—	Non-album single
"Coco" (with Durim Malaj)	2022	—	—	Non-album single
"Përgjithmonë" (with Majk)	2022	26	—	Non-album single
"Kalli"	2022	—	—	Non-album single
"Balenciaga" (with Lumi B)	2022	—	—	Non-album single
"Inati" (with Dardy)	2023	—	—	Non-album single
"Malli"	2023	—	—	Non-album single
"Të dua"	2023	—	—	Non-album single
"Për ty"	2023	—	—	Non-album single
"Ferrari" (with Melinda Ademi)	2023	—	—	Non-album single
"Dashni e vjetër"	2023	—	—	Non-album single
"Shtinja flakën" (with MatoLale and Luana Vjollca)	2023	—	—	Non-album single
"Mykonos"	2023	—	—	Non-album single
"Policia" (with Dardan and Il Ghost)	2023	—	91	Non-album single
"Betohemi 2"	2023	—	—	Non-album single
"Sa më do" (with Dj Gimi-O and Ricky Rich)	2023	—	—	Non-album single
"Mos ma prish" (with Melinda Ademi)	2023	—	—	Non-album single
"—" denotes a recording that did not chart or was not released in that territory.
