= Nino (Kosovan singer) =

Kosovan artist (born 2000)

- Also known as: Nino Vercetti
- Born: Altin Berisha; 2000 (age 25–26); Pristina, Kosovo
- Origin: Dragodan, Pristina
- Genre: Hip-hop
- Occupation: Recording artist
- Years active: 2021–present

Altin Berisha (born 2000), known professionally as Nino (stylised NINO), is a Kosovan hip-hop artist from Pristina. He records in Albanian and uses the name Nino Vercetti. Since 2021 he has released three extended plays, a mixtape and a series of singles, including collaborations with Kosovan and Albanian artists such as Capital T.

== Early life ==
Berisha was born in Pristina in 2000 and grew up in the neighbourhood known as Dragodan or Arbëria.

== Career ==
=== 2021–2024 ===
In May 2021, the news site Reporteri reported the release of Nino's single "DayDay" and its music video. In February 2022 he released his first EP, Djemt e Qytetit, followed by the single "Eja" in 2023. In July 2024 his single "Hotel" entered The Top List, a weekly music ranking published by Top Channel's Top Awards.

=== 2025–present ===
In April 2025, Nino released the EP Djemt e Qytetit 2, which includes collaborations with Young Arti, Ilo and Jolle. He released further singles through the rest of the year, including "Uba", "Trenerka T'milanos", "Del Ku Del" and "Familje", the last with Devqa.

In February 2026, he released the five-track EP Vercetti, with guest appearances by Capital T, Lumi B, Mak Zogaj, Ago and irayo. His later 2026 singles include "Vibe", "Njoni Tjetrin" and "Brokeboi". In October 2026 he released "Zog" with Bono and "Eki Eki" with Ilo.

== Discography ==
=== Extended plays ===
- Djemt e Qytetit (2022)
- Djemt e Qytetit 2 (2025)
- Vercetti (2026)

=== Singles ===
Year	Title	Notes
2021	"DayDay"	
2023	"Eja"	
2024	"Hotel"	
2025	"Uba"	
2025	"Trenerka T'milanos"	
2025	"Del Ku Del"	
2025	"Familje"	With Devqa
2026	"Airbnb"	
2026	"Vibe"	
2026	"Njoni Tjetrin"	With RZON
2026	"Brokeboi"	
2026	"Zog"	With Bono
2026	"Eki Eki"	With Ilo
