= Me tana =

2019 single by Elvana Gjata

Single by Elvana Gjata
- Language: Albanian
- Released: 10 December 2019
- Genre: Dance-pop
- Length: 3:40
- Label: East Music Matters (EMM)
- Songwriter: Elvana Gjata
- Producer: UNIK

Elvana Gjata singles chronology
"A m'don" (2019)	"Me tana" (2019)	"Thirr" (2021)

Music video
- "Me tana" on YouTube

"Me tana" (Albanian: [mɛ tana]; transl. With all or With everything) is a song by Albanian singer and songwriter Elvana Gjata released as a single on 10 December 2019 by East Music Matters (EMM). The song was written and composed by Gjata herself and produced by German-Greek producer UNIK. Musically, "Me tana" was described as an Albanian-language ethnic dance-pop song, which lyrically explores the theme of unconditional and hopeless love. Music critics and reviewers applauded the song upon its release, with praise concentrated on the song's composition, lyrics and Gjata's vocal delivery.

In December 2019, Gjata participated in the 58th edition of Festivali i Këngës to represent Albania in the Eurovision Song Contest 2020 in Rotterdam, the Netherlands. She finished in the second place despite being the favourite to win the competition. During her red and black-themed show of the song, she was accompanied by six backing dancers, while the background LED screens displayed different folklore-inspired images. An accompanying black and white lyric video was premiered to the official YouTube channel of Radio Televizioni Shqiptar (RTSH) on the same date and trended in numerous countries throughout Europe.

== Background and composition ==
"Me tana"
A 19-second sample of "Me tana", an Albanian-language ethnic dance-pop song. It lyrically focuses on the theme of unconditional and hopeless love.

"Me tana" was released on digital platforms and to streaming services as a single on 10 December 2019 through East Music Matters (EMM). The Albanian-language song, which runs three minutes and forty seconds, was produced by German-Greek producer UNIK and composed and written by Elvana Gjata herself, approximately a year prior to her participation at Festivali i Këngës. Musically, "Me tana" draws influence from the musical genres of dance-pop intertwined with ethnic elements. It lyrically focuses on Gjata's unconditional and hopeless love in which, according to a music reviewer, the singer "burst with emotions letting them out through the song". The song's title translated into English, "With all" or "With everything", is an expression for giving up everything of yourself, and giving it to the other person you love.

== Reception ==
"Me tana" received universal acclaim from music critics upon its release and was further considered a favourite to win Festivali i Këngës in December 2019. Robyn Gallagher of Wiwibloggs commended the song an "examination of deep feelings of love" and praised the song's lyrics which, according to her, reflect on "emotions" and "sensual delights". An editor of SoundsEuropean! was generally positive towards the song's nature calling it a "fresh blend of pop" with "ethnic touches". German Eurovision.de writer Irving Wolther compared the song with "Fuego" (2018) by Eleni Foureira. Several prominent figures, such as Aurela Gaçe, Besa Kokëdhima, Capital T, Ledri Vula and Eleni Foureira, came out in support of the song through their social media accounts. Premiered by Radio Televizioni Shqiptar (RTSH), the official lyric video of "Me tana" appeared on the YouTube trending charts in several countries, including in Albania, Germany, Greece, North Macedonia, Switzerland and Turkey, resulting as the most-viewed entry in Festivali i Këngës.

== Festivali i Këngës ==
The national broadcaster of Albania, Radio Televizioni Shqiptar (RTSH), organised the 58th edition of Festivali i Këngës in order to select the country's representative for the Eurovision Song Contest 2020 in Rotterdam, the Netherlands. The competition consisted of two semi-finals and the final held in December 2019 as well as 20 songs out of which the winner was determined by the votes from a jury panel. It opened a submission period for artists and composers between 28 May and 15 September 2019, while out of all received submissions, a jury panel internally selected 20 songs to participate in the competition's semi-finals. After being selected to compete, Elvana Gjata performed the song in the first semi-final on 19 December and qualified for the grand final on 21 December 2019. Despite being the favourite to win, the song eventually reached the second place in a field of 12 participants in the grand final. The three members of the international jury, consisting of Christer Björkman, Dimitris Kontopoulos and Felix Bergsson, ranked the song first, whereas the two Albanian jury members ranked it lower.

== Credits and personnel ==
Credits adapted from Tidal.

- Elvana Gjata – composing, songwriting, vocals
- UNIK – producing

== Track listing ==
- Digital download and streaming
1. "Me tana" – 3:40

== Release history ==
Release dates and formats for "Me tana"
Region	Date	Format	Label	Ref.
Various	10 December 2019	Digital download; streaming	EMM	
