= Eni Koçi =

Albanian rapper

- Born: 5 July 1996 (age 29); Berat, Albania
- Occupations: Singer; songwriter
- Years active: 2003–present

Eni Koçi (born 5 July 1996), is an Albanian singer and songwriter.

== Life ==
Eni Koçi was born on 5 July 1996 in Berat. She is the younger sister of Greta Koçi.

=== Career ===
She started with music at the age of 7 and gave her first results at the age of 10, where she won the second prize at the National Festival for Children with the song "Room with Toys".

In November 2008, she performed her second song "Hope asks you" which was performed as a video clip. This song and its video clip had an extraordinary success in the Albanian Music market. In March 2009, she performed her third song, but this time in collaboration with her sister Greta Koci. The song is titled "Ne Bejme Dem" and the video clip was completed on 13 May 2009 and was promoted on all Albanian music TV channels.

In November 2010, Eni Koçi & Capital T participate in Kënga Magjike with the song "Diva". Later with the famous rapper Noizy, Koçi publish the video clip "So Hot". With this song, Noizy & Eni Koçi participate in the Nights of the Albanian Clip in 2011.

== Personal life ==
Koçi is currently engaged to Montenegrin-Albanian singer Genc Prelvukaj and together they reside in Tirana. She is a longtime supporter of Sali Berisha and the Democratic Party of Albania.

== Discography ==
=== Singles ===
==== As lead artist ====
Title	Year	Peak chart positions	Album
Title	Year	ALB	Album
"Shpresë kërkon nga ti"	2012	—N/a	Non-album single
"Ne bëjmë dëm" (featuring Greta Koçi)	2012	—N/a	Non-album single
"Je gjithçka" (featuring Noizy)	2012	—N/a	Non-album single
"Diva" (featuring Capital T)	2012	—N/a	Non-album single
"So hot" (featuring Noizy)		—N/a	Non-album single
"Ty të kam"	2013	—N/a	Non-album single
"Tek ty"	2014	—N/a	Non-album single
"Motivi im"	2014	—N/a	Non-album single
"S'jam jetime" (featuring Greta Koçi)	2015	—N/a	Non-album single
"Me mu" (featuring Greta Koçi Gold AG)	2015	—N/a	Non-album single
"S'je për mu"	2016	—N/a	Non-album single
"Hold Up" (featuring Blake)	2017	—N/a	Non-album single
"Vetëm ti je" (featuring Genc Prelvukaj)	2017	—N/a	Non-album single
"Shi bie në Tiranë" (featuring Genc Prelvukaj)	2017	—N/a	Non-album single
"Jemi dashtë"	2018	—N/a	Non-album single
"Gabimet" (featuring MC Kresha)	2018	—N/a	Non-album single
"Harrove" (featuring Genc Prelvukaj)	2018	—N/a	Non-album single
"Zemër" (featuring Besnik Qaka)	2019	—N/a	Non-album single
"Afër teje" (featuring Olsi Bylyku)	2019	—N/a	Non-album single
"Larg" (featuring Elinel)	2019	—N/a	Non-album single
"Bella" (featuring Lindon)	2019	—N/a	Non-album single
"Sekreti"	2019	—N/a	Non-album single
"—" denotes a recording that did not chart or was not released in that territory.
