= MC Kresha =

Kosovo-Albanian rapper (born 1984)

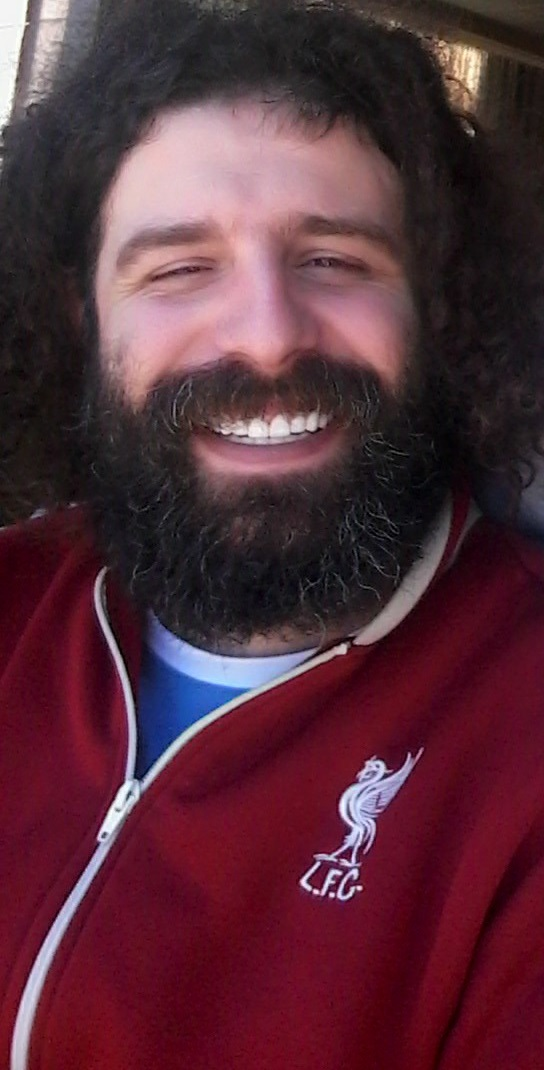
- MC Kresha in 2018
- Born: Kreshnik Fazliu; 5 September 1984 (age 42); Mitrovica, SFR Yugoslavia (present-day Kosovo)
- Occupation: Rapper
- Years active: 2008–present
- Spouse: Erzina Shehu (m. 2019)
- Children: 2
- Musical career
- Label: PINT

Kreshnik Fazliu (Albanian: [kɾɛˈʃnik fazˈliu]; born 5 September 1984), known professionally as MC Kresha or Mc Kresha, is a Kosovo-Albanian rapper.

== Life and career ==
=== Early life and career beginnings ===
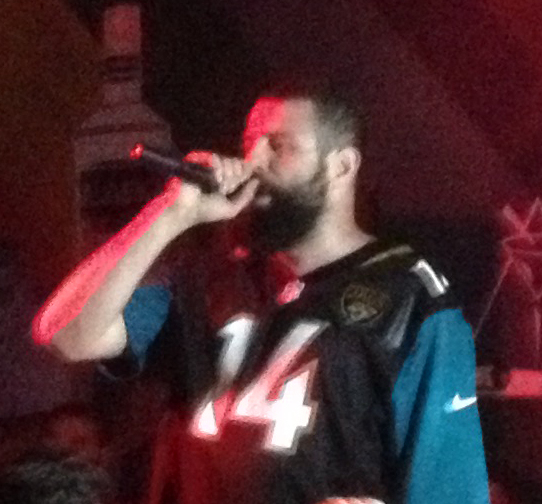
MC Kresha in 2015

Kreshnik Fazliu was born on 5 September 1984 in the city of Mitrovica, then part of the SFR Yugoslavia, present Kosovo. He released "Lej Flleshat" as a single in 2010. In 2011, Mc Kresha, Lyrical Son, Strike Beatz, K-Master & Onufër Berisha started their music label P.I.N.T ( Për Inati T'Njoni Tjetrit ). In July 2018, Fazliu was announced as an act at the Sunny Hill Festival on its debut edition, held in Pristina. In August 2019, he was approached to perform for a second time at the Sunny Hill Festival. Fazliu's fourth collaborative album, Muzikë e Alltisë, was released in January 2022. Songs featured on the record included "Hotel Mahalla", "Paret Lejla", "Rammstein" and "Stuhi mbi oqean", the latter featuring Albanian singer Elvana Gjata, which attained commercial success in Albania.

== Football career ==
Kreshnik Fazliu was a goalkeeper for the youth team of the Kosovan club KF Trepça. However, he could not become a professional footballer due to injuries and left football at the age of 18.

After receiving his UEFA license C, he was named the general manager of the Kosovan club FC Phoenix Banjë. On October 22, 2023, he resigned from his position as general manager to focus on his musical career.

== Personal life ==
Kreshnik Fazliu is married to Erzina Shehu. They have two children.

== Discography ==
=== Albums ===
==== Studio albums ====
| Title | Album details | Peak chart positions |
| Title | Album details | SWI |
|---|---|---|
| Patikat E Mia | Released: 1 June 2010; Label: AVD Digital, PINT; Format: Digital download, streaming | — |
| Air Force 1 | Released: 4 September 2012; Label: AVD Digital, PINT; Format: Digital download, streaming | — |
| Emceeclopedy | Released: 9 May 2014; Label: AVD Digital, PINT; Format: Digital download, streaming | 46 |
"—" denotes a recording that did not chart or was not released in that territory.

==== Collaborative albums ====
| Title | Album details | Peak chart positions |
| Title | Album details | SWI |
|---|---|---|
| Për Inati T'njoni Tjetrit (with Lyrical Son) | Released: 27 October 2011; Label: PINT; Format: Digital download, streaming | — |
| Rapsodët n'Rap t'Sotit (with Lyrical Son) | Released: 10 June 2016; Label: PINT; Format: Digital download, streaming | 4 |
| United State Of Albania (with MC Kresha, Elinel, Erno, Lluni, Semiautomvtik) | Released: 17 February 2019; Label: AVD Digital, PINT; Format: Digital download, streaming | — |
| Muzikë e Alltisë (with Lyrical Son) | Released: 12 January 2022; Label: AVD Digital, PINT; Format: Digital download, streaming | 35 |
"—" denotes a recording that did not chart or was not released in that territory.

=== Singles ===
==== As lead artist ====
| Title | Year | Peak chart positions | Album |
| Title | Year | ALB | Album |
|---|---|---|---|
| "N'ks" (with Snupa) | 2008 | —N/a | Non-album single |
| "Lej flleshat" | 2010 | —N/a | Patikat E Mia |
| "Lyrical Warfare" (featuring Dr. Mic) | 2010 | —N/a | Patikat E Mia |
| "Patikat e mia" | 2010 | —N/a | Patikat E Mia |
| "Kon pe shan me non" (with Lyrical Son featuring Singullar) | 2011 | —N/a | Për Inati T'njoni Tjetrit |
| "Hip hopin e du" (with Lyrical Son) | 2012 | —N/a | Për Inati T'njoni Tjetrit |
| "Nuk ini Gengsta" (with Lyrical Son) | 2012 | —N/a | Për Inati T'njoni Tjetrit |
| "Cok guzel" | 2012 | —N/a | Air Force 1 |
| "N'disko t'shqiptarve" | 2013 | —N/a | Non-album single |
| "Amsterdam" | 2014 | —N/a | Emceeclopedy |
| "Luv Luv" | 2014 | —N/a | Emceeclopedy |
| "Police" | 2014 | —N/a | Emceeclopedy |
| "Beat Murderer" (featuring Keepman and Lyrical Son) | 2014 | —N/a | Emceeclopedy |
| "Era" (with Lyrical Son) | 2015 | 1 | Rapsodët n'Rap t'Sotit |
| "Ky tipi" (with Lyrical Son) | 2016 | — | Rapsodët n'Rap t'Sotit |
| "Hip Hop" (with Lyrical Son featuring Ledri Vula) | 2016 | 1 | Rapsodët n'Rap t'Sotit |
| "Thirri krejt shoqet" (featuring Keepman) | 2016 | — | Rapsodët n'Rap t'Sotit |
| "Spo ma nin" (with Lyrical Son) | 2016 | — | Rapsodët n'Rap t'Sotit |
| "Jeni marre" (with Lyrical Son) | 2016 | — | Rapsodët n'Rap t'Sotit |
| "Hey Girl" (with Lyrical Son) | 2017 | — | Non-album single |
| "Duqa mi duqa" (with Lyrical Son) | 2017 | — | Non-album single |
| "Rruga n'club" (with Blleki and Lyrical Son) | 2018 | — | Non-album single |
| "Boulevard" | 2018 | — | Non-album single |
| "Menemadhe" (with Ledri Vula and Lyrical Son) | 2019 | 1 | Non-album single |
| "Private" (with Semiautomatic and Lyrical Son) | 2019 | — | Non-album single |
| "Pasite" (with Tayna and Lyrical Son) | 2019 | 1 | Non-album single |
| "Thug Life" (with Blleki and Luar) | 2019 | — | Non-album single |
| "Gjiganta" (with Ledri Vula) | 2020 | 11 | Non-album single |
| "Ajo po don" (with Lyrical Son) | 2020 | 8 | Non-album single |
"—" denotes a recording that did not chart or was not released in that territory.

==== As featured artist ====
| Title | Year | Peak chart positions | Album |
| Title | Year | ALB | Album |
|---|---|---|---|
| "Classy" (Dj Blunt featuring Real 1 and Mc Kresha) | 2009 | —N/a | Non-album single |
| "Classy" (Dj Blunt featuring Real 1 and Mc Kresha) | 2009 | —N/a | Non-album single |
| "La vida loca (Remix Me Dosta)" (Blero featuring F-Kay, Kaos, Lyrical Son, Real 1, Skillz and Mc Kresha) | 2009 | —N/a | Non-album single |
| "Kush o mama" (Leonora Poloska featuring Mc Kresha) | 2010 | —N/a | Non-album single |
| "Souljah" (Lyrical Son featuring Noga and Mc Kresha) | 2010 | —N/a | Non-album single |
| "Delicius" (Dafina Rexhepi featuring Mc Kresha) | 2010 | —N/a | Non-album single |
| "M.F." (Lil Samee featuring Dr. Mic, Dj Flow, Gentz, Lav'da, Kastro Zizo and Mc Kresha) | 2010 | —N/a | Non-album single |
| "Cha kisha ngjyros" (Garazhat e Bardha featuring Mc Kresha) | 2010 | —N/a | Non-album single |
| "Ca$h" (Aurela Gace featuring Mc Kresha) | 2011 | —N/a | Non-album single |
| "Boni zhurmë" (Dj Flow featuring Mc Kresha) | 2011 | —N/a | Non-album single |
| "As ni zo" (Nora Istrefi featuring Mc Kresha) | 2011 | —N/a | Non-album single |
| "Si bass" (Rina Abdyli featuring Flaka Krelani and Mc Kresha) | 2011 | —N/a | Non-album single |
| "Jabadabadu" (Rozana Radi featuring Mc Kresha) | 2011 | —N/a | Non-album single |
| "Çele çadren" (Dj Flow featuring Mc Kresha) | 2013 | —N/a | Non-album single |
| "Para" (Butch featuring KeepMan, Lyrical Son and Mc Kresha) | 2013 | —N/a | Non-album single |
| "Move ur bady" (Etnon featuring Lea Metolli and Mc Kresha) | 2013 | —N/a | Non-album single |
| "Me ta pyl" (Lyrical Son featuring Mc Kresha) | 2013 | —N/a | Non-album single |
| "Special" (Lyrical Son featuring Mc Kresha) | 2013 | —N/a | Non-album single |
| "Rikthejm na" (Kida featuring Mc Kresha) | 2014 | —N/a | Non-album single |
| "Ballin" (Capital T featuring Mc Kresha) | 2014 | —N/a | Non-album single |
| "Take A Picture" (Noizy featuring Mc Kresha) | 2014 | —N/a | Non-album single |
| "Bombshell" (Arta Bajrami featuring Don Arbas and Mc Kresha) | 2014 | —N/a | Non-album single |
| "1990" (Elvana Gjata featuring Mc Kresha) | 2014 | —N/a | Non-album single |
| "Edhe tri" (Gjiko featuring Mc Kresha) | 2015 | —N/a | Non-album single |
| "Asaj" (Arta Bajrami featuring Mc Kresha) | 2017 | — | Non-album single |
| "Ikim" (Bleta featuring Mc Kresha) | 2017 | — | Non-album single |
| "Jena pa" (Offchestra featuring Mc Kresha) | 2017 | — | Non-album single |
| "Numra" (Capital T featuring Mc Kresha) | 2017 | 3 | Winter Is Here |
| "Për familje" (Elinel featuring Mc Kresha) | 2018 | — | Non-album single |
| "Ping Pong" (Alban Skënderaj featuring Mc Kresha) | 2018 | 3 | Non-album single |
| "Mafia Shqip" (Lyrical Son featuring Mc Kresha) | 2018 | — | Non-album single |
| "Gabimet" (Eni Koçi featuring Mc Kresha) | 2018 | — | Non-album single |
| "Psikopatja jote" (Fifi featuring Mc Kresha) | 2018 | — | Non-album single |
| "Habibi" (Rino featuring Mc Kresha) | 2018 | — | Non-album single |
| "Rick Ross" (Lluni featuring Lyrical Song and Mc Kresha) | 2019 | — | Non-album single |
| "Art Abazi" (Enigme featuring Mc Kresha) | 2019 | — | Non-album single |
| "KG" (Singi featuring Mc Kresha) | 2020 | — | Non-album single |
| "Vetë e lype" (Dafina Zeqiri featuring Mc Kresha) | 2021 | 7 | Dafinë moj |
| "Heku qafë" (Capital T featuring Mc Kresha) | 2021 | 1 | Heart Broken Kids |
| "Maje" (Lumi B featuring Lyrical Song and Mc Kresha) | 2021 | — | Non-album single |
"—" denotes a recording that did not chart or was not released in that territory.

==== Other charted songs ====
| Title | Year | Peak chart positions | Album |
| Title | Year | ALB | Album |
|---|---|---|---|
| "Hotel Mahalla" (with Lyrical Son) | 2022 | 34 | Muzikë e Alltisë |
| "Paret Lejla" (with Lyrical Son) | 2022 | 29 | Muzikë e Alltisë |
| "Stuhi mbi oqean" (with Lyrical Son featuring Elvana Gjata) | 2022 | 3 | Muzikë e Alltisë |
| "Rammstein" (with Lyrical Son) | 2022 | 16 | Muzikë e Alltisë |
"—" denotes a recording that did not chart or was not released in that territory.
