= Gjaku im =

2012 single by Elvana Gjata

- Official cover for "Gjaku im"

Single by Elvana Gjata

from the album Afër dhe Larg
- Language: Albanian
- Released: 20 January 2013
- Genre: Pop rock
- Length: 3:56
- Label: Threedots Productions
- Composer: Flori Mumajesi
- Lyricist: Dalina Buzi

Elvana Gjata singles chronology
"Afër dhe Larg" (2011)	"Gjaku im" (2013)	"Beso" (2013)

Music video
- "Gjaku im" on YouTube

"Gjaku im" (Albanian pronunciation: [ɟaku im]; transl. My blood) is a song recorded by Albanian singer and songwriter Elvana Gjata released as the last single from her second studio album, Afër dhe Larg (2011). The song was written by Dalina Buzi and composed by Flori Mumajesi.

== Background and composition ==
An Albanian-language pop rock song, "Gjaku im" has a running time of three minutes and fifty six seconds and is lyrically a manifesto that focuses on raising awareness about violence against women. It was written by Albanian writer Dalina Buzi and composed by Elvana's regular collaborator Albanian singer and songwriter Flori Mumajesi. In terms of the music notation, the song was composed in 4/4 time performed in the key of G♭ minor in common time with an andante moderato tempo of 96 beats per minute.

== Promotion ==
An accompanying music video for "Gjaku im" officially premiered onto Elvana Gjata's YouTube channel on 28 April 2012, preceded by a teaser released three days prior. The aforementioned was later deleted for unknown reasons and re-uploaded to Youtube on 20 November 2014. However, "Gjaku im" was released on digital platforms and to streaming services as a single on 20 November 2013 through Threedots Productions.

== Release history ==
Region	Date	Format	Label	Ref.
Various	20 November 2013	Digital download; streaming	Threedots Productions	
