= Pow (Elvana Gjata song) =

2022 single by Elvana Gjata

Single by Elvana Gjata
- Language: Albanian
- Released: 11 February 2022
- Genre: R&B; urban
- Length: 2:55
- Label: East Music Matters; Loudcom Media
- Songwriters: Elvana Gjata; Denk; Tonic
- Producers: Andy Gramm; Panda

Elvana Gjata singles chronology
"Ska" (2022)	"Pow" (2022)	"Ex" (2022)

Music video
- "Pow" on YouTube

"Pow" is a song by Albanian singer and songwriter Elvana Gjata. The song was written by Gjata, Denk and Tonic, while produced by Andy Gramm and Panda. Loudcom Media under exclusive license from East Music Matters released it as a single for digital download and streaming on 11 February 2022. It is an Albanian-language R&B and urban song, exploring the story of a heartbroken and disappointed woman.

Upon release, "Pow" garnered positive reviews from selected music critics, with praise concentrated on Gjata's appearance and vocal delivery. An accompanying music video was uploaded to Gjata's YouTube channel on 10 June 2021, depicting her in various locations in New York City. Commercially, the song achieved success, ranking number three in Albania.

== Background and composition ==
On 2 February 2022, Gjata uploaded a preview on her Instagram, teasing "Pow". In the description, the singer announced the single's release date scheduled for 11 February 2022. "Pow" was made internationally available as a single for digital download and streaming on the announced date by Loudcom Media under exclusive license from East Music Matters. It was written by Gjata in collaboration with Denk and Tonic, while produced by Andy Gramm and Panda. Musically, "Pow" was noted by critical commentary as a "melancholic" Albanian-language R&B and urban song with a "charming retro" atmosphere. Lasting two minutes and 55 seconds, it lyrically tells the tale of a heartbroken woman, who has been disappointed by love.

== Reception ==
Upon release, "Pow" was met with positive reviews from selected music critics. In a review for Illyrian Pirates, the author praised the song's nature as well as Gjata's "smooth" and "passionate" vocal delivery and further went on to emphasise her "beautiful" voice, which, according to them, makes the song "irresistible". A writer for Dosja concluded that the lyrics are the most focusing point of the song, while an editor from Top Music highlighted "Pow" out as perhaps one of the singer's best songs. Commercially, on the Swiss singles chart, the song debuted at number 98 for the week ending 20 February 2022, and trended on the Swiss Spotify chart. In the year 2022, Top Albania Radio included the song in its year-end compilation of the top songs, positioning it at number 32.

== Music video ==
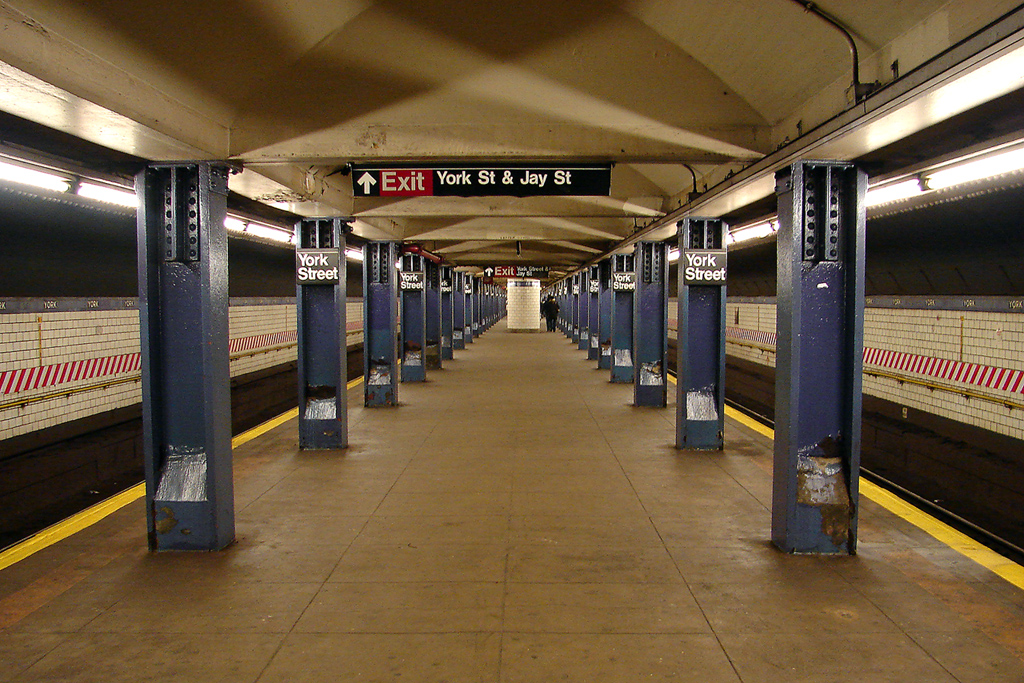
Scenes from the music video were filmed at the York Street station in New York City.

A music video for "Pow" was uploaded to Gjata's official YouTube channel on 10 June 2021 at 23:59 (CET). The nearly three-minute long video was directed by Albanian photographer Erald Kraja, who also received credit as the director of photography with Georgian Cinematographer Lasha Nebieridze. Filmed in New York City, the video contains scenes of Gjata performing at different locations across the city, including the York Street station.

Labeling the video as "stunning", the author of Illyrian Pirates attended to commend Gjata's fashion as "stylish". Giannis Dimitrellos from Mikropragmata similarly complimented the singer's appearance, describing it a "fresher" version of American singer Fergie during her Black Eyed Peas period. From Njeshi, the writer further praised the singer's fashion, while on a similar note, the staff of Gazeta Metro lauded her style, noting the use of springtime colors.

== Credits and personnel ==
Credits adapted from Tidal and YouTube.

- Elvana Gjata – composing, songwriting, vocals
- Andy Gramm – composing, songwriting
- Denk – composing, songwriting
- Koen Heldens – mastering, mixing
- Panda – producing
- Tonic – composing, songwriting

== Charts ==
Chart performance for "Pow"
Chart (2022)	Peak position
Switzerland (Schweizer Hitparade)	98

== Release history ==
Release dates and formats for "Pow"
Region	Date	Format(s)	Label(s)	Ref.
Various	11 February 2022	Digital download; streaming	EMM; Loudcom Media	
