= Majk (rapper) =

Albanian rapper (born 1989)

- Born: Kastriot Rexha; 27 November 1989 (age 36); Pristina, SFR Yugoslavia (present-day Kosovo)
- Occupation: Rapper
- Years active: 2010–present
- Musical career
- Label: Babastars

Kastriot Rexha (Albanian: [kastɾiˈɔt ˈɾɛdʒa]; born 27 November 1989), known professionally as Majk or Dr. Mic, is an Albanian rapper.

== Life and career ==
=== 1989–2005: Early life and career beginnings ===
Kastriot Rexha was born on 27 November 1989 into an Albanian family in the city of Pristina, then part of the Socialist Federal Republic of Yugoslavia, present Kosovo. He started as a member of the rap duo TDS along with Kosovo-Albanian rapper Onat. After releasing their first album, 17 Arsye, the group split in 2009.

== Discography ==
=== Singles ===
==== As lead artist ====
Title	Year	Peak chart positions	Album
Title	Year	ALB	Album
"Sa dit sa net" (with Snupa)	2013	—N/a	Non-album single
"S'jena mo" (featuring Ghetto Geasy)	2015	—	Non-album single
"Dashni"	2015	—	Non-album single
"Kcen"	2016	—	Non-album single
"Fund"	2016	—	Non-album single
"Katile"	2017	—	Non-album single
"Stila"	2017	—	Non-album single
"Tarantino"	2017	—	Non-album single
"Paris Milano" (featuring Ghetto Geasy)	2018	—	Non-album single
"Krejt ti fala" (featuring Yll Limani)	2018	1	Non-album single
"Qikita"	2018	—	Non-album single
"Thirri dajt" (featuring Onat)	2018	—	Non-album single
"Nuk dorëzohna"	2019	—	Non-album single
"Sa gjynah" (featuring Butrint Imeri)	2019	1	Non-album single
"Malena" (featuring Ghetto Geasy)	2019	—	Non-album single
"Hala" (featuring Capital T)	2019	1	Non-album single
"Sytë mu kanë qorru"	2020	—	Non-album single
"Marr" (featuring Ledri Vula)	2021	—	Non-album single
"Më fal" (featuring Dafina Zeqiri)	2022	9	Non-album single
"—" denotes a recording that did not chart or was not released in that territory.
