= Thirr =

2021 single by Elvana Gjata

Single by Elvana Gjata
- Language: Albanian
- Released: 4 February 2021
- Length: 2:54
- Label: East Music Matters; Loudcom Media
- Songwriter: Elvana Gjata
- Producer: Darko Dimitrov

Elvana Gjata singles chronology
| "Me tana" (2019) | "Thirr" (2021) | "Loti" (2021) |

Music video
- "Thirr" on YouTube

"Thirr" (Albanian: [θˈir]; transl. Call) is a song by Albanian singer and songwriter Elvana Gjata, written and composed by the singer and produced by Macedonian producer Darko Dimitrov. It was released as a single by Loudcom Media under exclusive license from East Music Matters on 4 February 2021. Musically, it is an Albanian-language ballad which lyrically touches on a past and painful relationship. A minimalist music video was uploaded to the singer's YouTube channel on her birthday on 3 February 2021.

== Background and composition ==
Loudcom Media under exclusive license from East Music Matters made "Thirr" available as a single for digital download and streaming in various countries on 4 February 2021. Lasting two minutes and 54 seconds, the song was written and composed by Gjata, and produced by Macedonian producer Darko Dimitrov. It served as her first single in over a year after "Me tana", with whom she participated in the 58th edition of Festivali i Këngës.

"Thirr" is musically an Albanian language "emotional" ballad incorporating "melancholic" and "sensual" elements in its notes reminiscent of Gjata's second extended play 3. Lyrically, it touches on a past and painful relationship, in which Gjata sings about a love interest who she put at the centre of her world, but who didn't show up for her.

== Music video ==
An accompanying lyrics video was uploaded to Gjata's official YouTube channel on 3 February 2021, to coincide with her 34th birthday. The minimalist video most notably depicts scenes of Gjata with a glass of wine in front of a fireplace singing along to the song.

== Personnel ==
Credits adapted from Tidal and YouTube.

- Elvana Gjata – composing, songwriting, vocals
- Darko Dimitrov – arranging, producing

== Track listing ==
- Digital download
1. "Thirr" – 2:54

== Release history ==
| Region | Date | Format(s) | Label | Ref. |
|---|---|---|---|---|
| Various | 4 February 2021 | Digital download; streaming | Loudcom Media; EMM | |
