= Kidda (rapper) =

Kosovar rapper (born 1997)

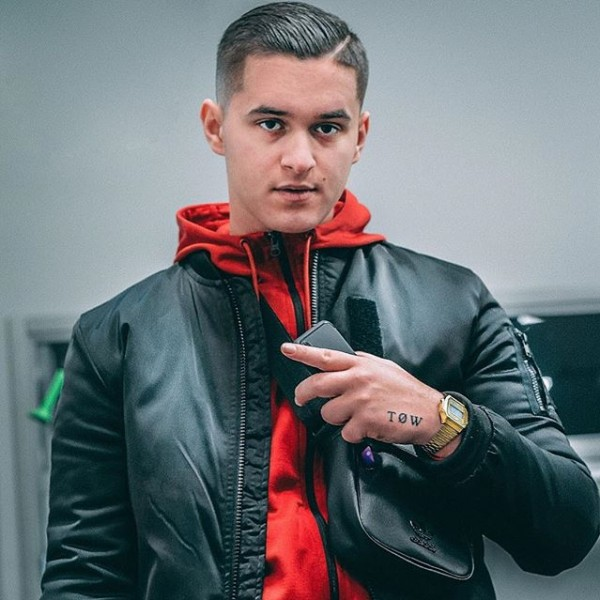
- Kida in 2018

Background information
- Born: Mërgim Kida; 7 August 1997 (age 29); Gävle, Sweden
- Origin: Gjakovë, Kosovo
- Genres: Hip hop; R&B; dancehall
- Occupations: Rapper; singer; songwriter
- Years active: 2016–present
- Label: Sony Music

Mërgim Kida (Albanian: [məɾgim kida]; born 7 August 1997), known professionally as Kidda, is a Kosovan rapper and singer.

== Life and career ==
Mërgim Kida was born on 7 August 1997 into an Albanian family from Gjakovë, Kosovo, in the city of Gävle, Sweden.

== Discography ==
=== Singles ===
==== As lead artist ====
Title	Year	Peak chart positions				Album
Title	Year	ALB	AUT	GER	SWI	Album
"In my zone"	2016	—	—	—	—	Non-album single
"Right here"	2016	—	—	—	—	Non-album single
"Like dat"	2017	—	—	—	—	Non-album single
"A m'foli mu"	2017	—	—	—	—	Non-album single
"Komedi" (with S4mm)	2018	—	—	—	—	Non-album single
"Bye Bye"	2018	—	—	—	—	Non-album single
"Flake" (featuring Ermal Fejzullahu)	2018	—	—	—	—	Non-album single
"$Uper$Tars" (with Obey)	2018	—	—	—	—	Non-album single
"My Money"	2018	—	—	—	—	Non-album single
"Sa ke ti"	2018	—	—	—	—	Non-album single
"Mega"	2018	—	—	—	—	Non-album single
"Jump on it"	2019	—	—	—	—	Non-album single
"Bella"	2019	—	—	—	—	Non-album single
"Coco"	2019	—	—	—	—	Non-album single
"Zemra ime"	2019	—	—	—	—	Non-album single
"Qa po thu?"	2020	—	—	—	—	Non-album single
"Loca"	2020	—	—	—	—	Non-album single
"Malli"	2020	12	—	—	20	Non-album single
"Cataleya"	2020	12	—	—	51	Non-album single
"Pale" (with Dardan)	2021	—	51	57	26	Non-album single
"Magji" (with Capital T)	2021	2	—	—	—	Non-album single
"040 Dukat"	2021	71	—	—	—	Non-album single
"Low"	—	—	—	—	2022	
"—" denotes a recording that did not chart or was not released in that territory.					2022	

==== As featured artist ====
Title	Year	Peak chart positions	Album
Title	Year	SWI	Album
"E imja" (DJ A-Boom featuring Kidda)	2017	36	Non-album single
"—" denotes a recording that did not chart or was not released in that territory.
