= Elvana Gjata =

Albanian singer and songwriter (born 1987)

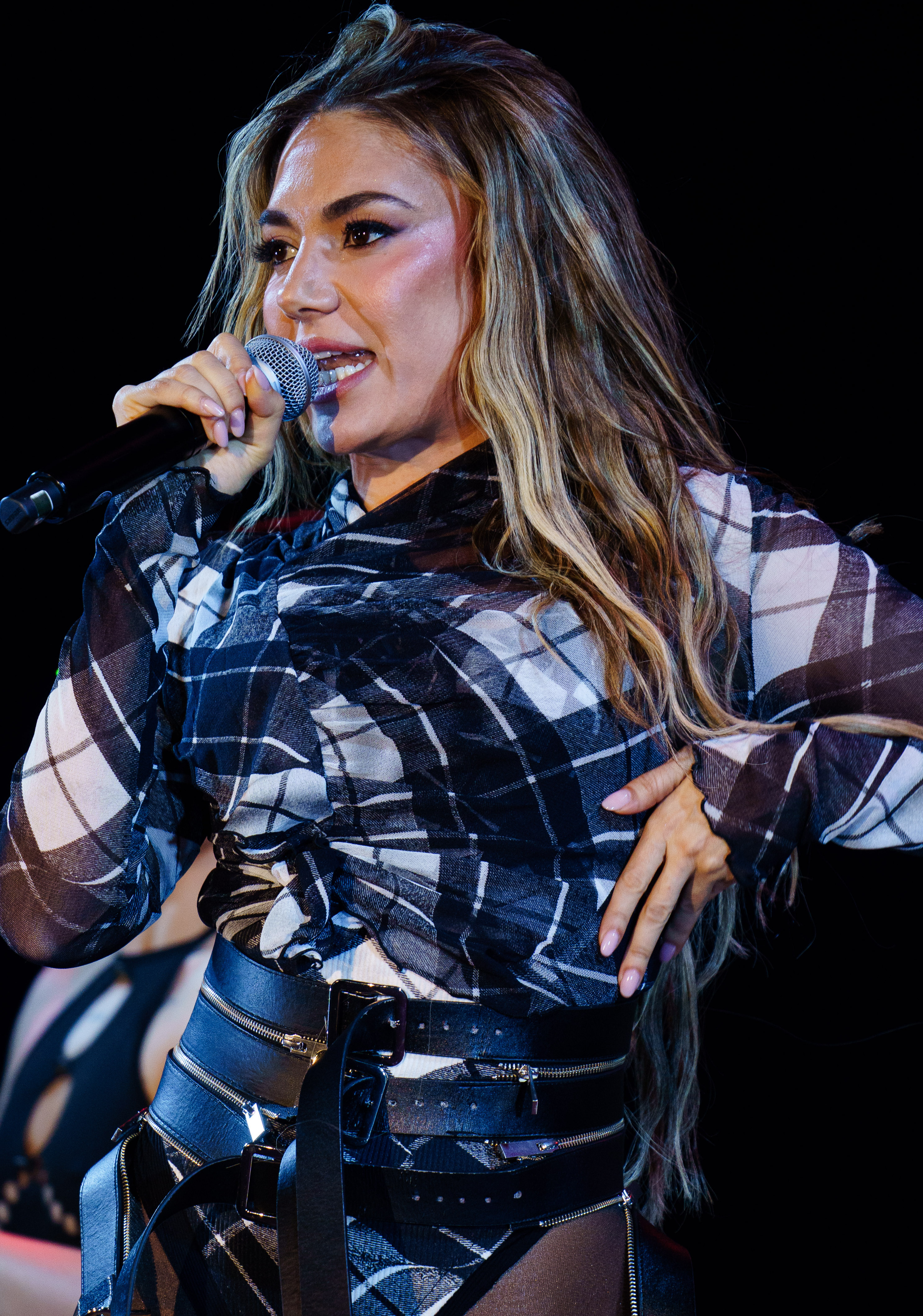
- Gjata in 2025
- Born: 3 February 1987 (age 39); Tirana, Albania
- Other names: Ela; Elëvana
- Education: University of Arts, Tirana
- Occupations: Singer; songwriter
- Years active: 2001–present
- Notable work: Discography; songs; videography
- Awards: Full list
- Musical career
- Genres: R&B; pop
- Instruments: Vocals
- Label: East Music Matters (EMM)

Elvana Gjata (Albanian: [ɛlˈvana ˈɟata]; born 3 February 1987) is an Albanian singer and songwriter. Born and raised in Tirana, she has been referred to as a "Diva of Albanian music". She rose to recognition in Albania and other Albanian-speaking territories in the Balkans following the release of her two studio albums, Mamës (2007) and Afër dhe larg (2011). The singer saw further success through many acclaimed singles, as well as her extended plays 3 (2018) and Çelu (2021), and has achieved multiple number one singles in the Albanian singles chart. Gjata has also received numerous awards and accolades, including two Balkan Music Awards, two times second place Festivali i Këngës Award, four Kënga Magjike Awards and a Top Fest Award.

== Life and career ==
=== 1987–2010: Early life and career beginnings ===
Elvana Gjata was born to Fatmir and Donika Gjata on 3 February 1987 into an Albanian family of the Catholic faith in Tirana, then part of the People's Socialist Republic, present Albania. Her father served in the Albanian Armed Forces for more than two decades. Migena, her elder sister, is also a musician and soprano with a career based in Germany. Gjata studied at the University of Arts in Tirana to become a film director. Defining her youth, Gjata stated that she was raised in a poor but happy household. At the age of 14, Gjata auditioned for the Albanian talent show Ethet e së premtes mbrëma and began dedicating herself to music. The singer unsuccessfully participated in the 42nd edition of Festivali i Këngës in December 2003, with the song "Pranë teje". "Të kam xhan", her follow-up single, was released in 2004, with whom the singer competed in that year's edition of Kënga Magjike. Following this, she started to work on her debut studio album, Mamës. Gjata has since then participated in two subsequent editions of the contest, including in 2007 and 2009 with the songs "Ku jeton dashuria" and "Dhe zemra ndal", respectively. In June 2011, Gjata won the 8th edition of Top Fest with the song "Me ty", which she dedicated to her friend Elsina Hidersha who died following a car accident that year.

=== 2011–2016: Afër dhe larg ===
In August 2011, Gjata released her second studio album, Afër dhe Larg, with fifteen tracks, comprising the eponymous single "Afër dhe Larg". Due to its success, the single received Gjata's first international award of her career at the 2012 Balkan Music Awards in Sofia, Bulgaria. Later that year, the singer was featured on the advertising campaign of Türk Ekonomi Bankası (TEB) in Kosovo. In February 2012, she was announced as one of the contestants for season three of Albania's Dancing with the Stars. Considered one of the favourites to win, Gjata received high scores during the course of her tenure on the show and ultimately won the competition in the final. The follow-up single "Gjaku im" was released in April 2012 to commemorate the 100th Anniversary of the Independence of Albania, which she also dedicated to the Albanian people. Shortly thereafter, she was chosen as the face of the Albanian television platform Tring Digital. In March 2013, in a collaboration with Albanian rapper 2po2, Gjata released the well-received single "Beso".

In February 2014, Gjata released "Disco Disco" featuring Kosovo-Albanian duo Kaos, followed by the release of "Puthe", which peaked at number 37 in Poland. That year, she released her first extended play, Acoustic Live Session, showcasing live performances of five songs, including "Anonim", "As ti", "Mëngjesi i kësaj here", "Pak nga pak" and "Si une". Also in 2014, she was announced as the official face of the Albanian telecommunication company, Albtelecom. In March 2015, she collaborated with Albanian musician Flori Mumajesi on "Kuq e zi je ti", which was selected as the official supporters song for Albania's participation at the 2016 UEFA European Championship in France. A year after its release, "Love me" featuring Albanian singer Bruno was nominated for the Song of the Year at the 2016 Top Music Awards. In July 2016, she unexpectedly released her follow-up number one single "Njësoj" without any prior announcement or promotion. In October 2016, she scored her second number one single with "Lejla", a collaboration with Albanian rappers Capital T and 2po2.

=== 2017–2021: 3 and Çelu ===
Following several months spent in the United States, Gjata came into close liaison with American producer Poo Bear and French disc jockey David Guetta with whom she started to work with. In February 2017, she attended the 59th Annual Grammy Awards in Los Angeles upon the invitation of Poo Bear. By June 2017, her first English-language single, "Forever Is Over", became a number-one single in Albania. Gjata's second extended play, 3, was released on her 31st birthday on 3 February 2018, and also included the two number one chart-topping songs, "Më fal" and "Xheloz". In April 2018, she was featured on Poo Bear's single "Shade" and collaborated with American singer Ty Dolla Sign on her follow-up single "Off Guard". After Gjata's return to Albania in the same year, the follow-up releases, "Ku Vajti" and "Mike", both attained success in her native country as they reached number 2. In February 2019, following a certain commercial hiatus, she released her next number one single, "Tavolina e mërzisë" In June 2019, Gjata collaborated a second time with Capital T on the follow-up single "Fustani", which went on to peak at number one in Albania. "Fustani" was succeeded by "Meine Liebe" featuring German-Albanian singer Ardian Bujupi, reaching number 73 in Switzerland.

In August 2019, Gjata premiered "A m'don", and went on to perform at the Sunny Hill Festival in Pristina, sharing the stage with other acclaimed artists, such as Miley Cyrus, Calvin Harris and Dua Lipa. In October 2019, the Albanian broadcaster, Radio Televizioni Shqiptar (RTSH), announced that Gjata would compete in the 58th edition of Festivali i Këngës, the country's national selection competition for the Eurovision Song Contest 2020, with the song "Me tana". Gjata became the bookmakers' and fans' favourite to win the competition, though in the grand final she finished in second place. Returning after a year of absence, she released her follow-up single "Thirr" to coincide with her 34th birthday on 3 February 2021, which debuted at number one. The singer's third extended play, Çelu, was issued in April 2021. "Drandofilat", "Kunadhe" and "Mos u ngut" from the record peaked at number one on the Albanian Top 100, while both "A po vjen" and "Kur jemi dasht" reached the top 20. In June 2021, Gjata's next single, "Loti", went on to reach number one in Albania and continued its success abroad, peaking at number 55 in Switzerland. Nevertheless, the singer's chart success ensued into July 2021 with the single "E di" featuring Kosovo-Albanian singer Yll Limani. In August 2021, the follow-up single "Papa", a collaboration with Romanian artists Sickotoy and Inna, had peaked at number 327 in the Commonwealth of Independent States (CIS), and number 18 on the Romanian Airplay 100 chart in November 2021.

=== 2022–present: Continued success ===
From January to March 2022, Gjata's follow-up singles "Ska" with Kosovo-Albanian rapper Mozzik, "Pow" and "Ex" with German-Albanian disc jockey Gimi-O and Macedonian-Albanian rapper Bardhi, attained commercial success in selected territories. In April 2023 she released a collaboration with the singer Dhurata Dora "Rrotullo". The song was produced by Panda Music. "Synin" was her next single that she released on 16 June 2023. Elvana Gjata held her grand concert at the "Air Albania" stadium on 22 June 2023, under the name "Decade", which is related to the fact that this is a key moment of her musical journey of two decades. In July 2023, she released "Si Na" and "Pak". In October 2024, RTSH announced that Gjata would compete in the 63rd edition of Festivali i Këngës, the national selection competition for the Eurovision Song Contest 2025 with the song "Karnaval". She finished second place in the final.

In 2023, Elvana Gjata held a concert titled Dekada at the Air Albania Stadium in Tirana. The event was sold out, with approximately 25,000 attendees, making it the most attended concert by a solo artist in Albania to date.

A year later, Gjata performed at the Lanxess Arena in Cologne. This concert was also sold out, drawing an audience of around 20,000 people. It stands as the most attended concert by an Albanian artist abroad.

== Artistry ==
"Me tana"
A 19-second sample of "Me tana", an example of Gjata's musical work incorporating a fusion of ethnic and dance-pop elements.

The artistic and musical work as well as the fashion sense of Gjata are widely covered by media throughout Albania and the Albanian-speaking Balkans. Several observers have commended her fashion style for its captiousness and versatility describing her as an icon of fashion. Gjata's music has generally been regarded as r&b and pop, although she has been experimenting with a variety of other music genres, including EDM, ethnic-pop, dance-pop, funk, pop rock and soul. She has cited Albanian musicians Vaçe Zela, Parashqevi Simaku, Aurela Gaçe and Nexhmije Pagarusha as well as Canadian singer Celine Dion as her musical influences and inspirations.

== Other ventures ==
Throughout her career, Gjata has ventured into other businesses and industries, including film, fashion and design. In 2014, she has posed for the cover of the British Velvet and Albanian Anabel magazines, respectively. In 2016, she first entered the fashion industry partnering with international Albanian fashion designer Valdrin Sahiti to launch the exclusive gown collection line "Lejla".

== Personal life ==
In 2023, Gjata declared her adherence to pescetarianism and veganism, emphasising that her dietary proportion consists of being "90% vegan and 10% pescetarian".

== Discography ==
- Mamës (2007)
- Afër dhe Larg (2011)
- Acoustic Live Session (2013)
- 3 (2018)
- Çelu (2021)
- TRILOGJI (Kapitulli I - GRADA) (2025)

== Filmography ==
- 2 Gisht Mjaltë (2019)
- 2 Gisht Mjaltë 2 (2024)
- Tenxherja Kapakun (2024)

== See also ==
- Elvana Gjata videography
- List of awards and nominations received by Elvana Gjata
