= A m'don =

2019 single by Elvana Gjata

Single by Elvana Gjata
- Language: Albanian
- Released: 9 August 2019
- Genre: Pop
- Length: 3:08
- Label: East Music Matters
- Songwriters: Elvana Gjata; Arber Zeqo
- Producer: Arbre Blass

Elvana Gjata singles chronology
"Meine Liebe" (2019)	"A m'don" (2019)	"Me tana" (2019)

Music video
- "A m'don" on YouTube

"A m'don" (Albanian pronunciation: [a m'dɔn]; transl. Do you love me) is a song recorded by Albanian singer and songwriter Elvana Gjata. The song was written by the aforementioned artist together with Albanian composer Arber Zeqo. Besides that it was produced by Albanian producer Arbre Blass, and both mastered and mixed by Swedish producer Johan Bejerholm. In its romantic love-inspired lyrics, the Albanian-language song discusses the theme of sensual desire and Gjata's aspiration for her love interest. An official music video was filmed in Turkey and depicts Gjata being surrounded by females of different ethnicities, body shapes and sizes performing the song in a garden of a mansion in Istanbul.

== Background and composition ==
"A m'don" has a running time of three minutes and nine seconds, and was written by Gjata herself together with Arber Zeqo. Its production was handled by Arbre Blass while being mastered and mixed by Johan Bejerholm. In regard to the music notation, it was composed in 4/4 time performed in the key of A♭ minor in common time with an allegretto tempo of 113 beats per minute. Characterised as a pop song, it lyrically focuses on Gjata's desire and references to romance as she asks her love interest whether he still loves her despite her absence. Lyrics of "A m'don" include, "My soul can't sleep peacefully [...] but I need to know if you still love me — do you have something to tell me?".

== Music video ==
A shot of the music video, showcasing Gjata with two accompanying females lying on a white blanket.

The accompanying music video for "A m'don" was officially premiered onto Gjata's YouTube channel on 8 August 2019, where it has since amassed more than 20 million views. It was directed by her recent collaborator Emir Khalilzadeh, who previously directed her music video for "Fustani". Cansu Yilmaz and Ceyhun Sevil acted as the video producers, while Emre Karbek was hired as the director of photography.

Filmed in the city of Istanbul, Gjata is prominently shown with multiple other females of different ethnicities, body shapes and sizes. The music video commences with a blurred shot of Gjata behind a white curtain, and switches to two separate females walking into the key location. As the video progresses, the singer is shown wearing a white cropped playsuit while dancing to the song in front of three columns between white-hanging curtains. Over the rest of the video, the cameras display Gjata accompanied by the two women sitting on pool stairs, and lying on a white blanket.

== Personnel ==
Credits adapted from Tidal and YouTube.

- Elvana Gjata – performing, songwriting, vocals
- Arber Zeqo – songwriting
- Johan Bejerholm – mixing and mastering
- Emir Khalilzadeh – video directing
- Cansu Yilmaz – video production
- Ceyhun Sevil – video production
- Emre Karbek – photo directing
- Özkan Aksular – editing

== Track listing ==
- Digital download
1. "A m'don" – 3:08

== Charts ==
Chart (2019)	Peak position
Albania (The Top List)	2
Switzerland (Spotify Charts)	161

== Release history ==
Region	Date	Format	Label	Ref.
Various	9 August 2019	Digital download; streaming	East Music Matters	
