= Afër dhe Larg (song) =

2011 single by Elvana Gjata

Single by Elvana Gjata

from the album Afër dhe Larg
- Released: 29 November 2011
- Genre: House-pop
- Length: 3:21
- Label: Threedots Production
- Composer: Flori Mumajesi
- Lyricist: Flori Mumajesi

Elvana Gjata singles chronology
"Me Ty" (2011)	"Afër dhe Larg" (2011)	"Gjaku im" (2012)

Music video
- "Afër dhe Larg" on YouTube

"Afër dhe Larg" (Albanian pronunciation: [afəɾ ðɛ laɾg]; transl. Near and far) is a song recorded by Albanian singer and songwriter Elvana Gjata released as the lead single from her second studio album, Afër dhe Larg (2011). The song was entirely written and composed by Albanian musician Flori Mumajesi.

The song is an Albanian language house-pop song and speaks about the feeling of "having and not having anyone near, of an emotion that begins and ends where it begins". It was one of Elvana's most successful songs and was voted best Albanian song at the 2012 Balkan Music Awards.

== Background ==
=== Composition ===
"Afër dhe Larg" performed by Elvana Gjata was written and composed by Albanian musician Flori Mumajesi with whom she has extensively worked on the eponymous studio album. The song was composed in 4/4 time and is performed in the key of E♭ minor in common time with a tempo of 128 beats per minute. The video was shot in Greece and won "Video of the Year" at the Balkan Music Awards.

=== Promotion ===
The accompanying music video for the song was officially premiered onto the YouTube channel of Elvana Gjata in July 2011 and was re-uploaded on 20 November 2014.

== Release history ==
Region	Date	Format(s)	Label	Ref.
Various	29 November 2011	Digital download; streaming	Threedots Production	
