= Forever Is Over (Elvana Gjata song) =

2017 single by Elvana Gjata

"Forever is Over"

Single by Elvana Gjata
- Released: 16 June 2017
- Genre: EDM
- Length: 2:54
- Label: East Music Matters
- Composers: Elvana Gjata; David Guetta; Giorgio Tuinfort; Poo Bear
- Producers: David Guetta; Giorgio Tuinfort; Poo Bear

Elvana Gjata singles chronology
"Lejla" (2016)	"Forever is Over" (2017)	"Off Guard" (2018)

Music video
- "Forever is Over" on YouTube

"Forever is Over" is a song performed by Albanian singer and songwriter Elvana Gjata. It was released as a single on 16 June 2017 for download and streaming by East Music Matters. It was composed and produced by Gjata together with David Guetta, Giorgio Tuinfort and Poo Bear. Musically, it is an English-language electronic dance song, which lyrically focus on new beginnings and encourage people to stand up in difficult situations. The official music video for the song was shot in Spain and was uploaded on 14 June 2017 onto YouTube in order to accompany the single's release. It features the singer riding a striking black horse in the main video show across the scenic desert landscape of Bardenas Reales until she arrives to an old abandoned house before it ends.

== Background and composition ==
Lasting two minutes and fifty four seconds, "Forever is Over" was composed by Gjata, David Guetta, Giorgio Tuinfort and Poo Bear. Josh Gudwin and Chris G were additionally hired for the song's mixing and mastering process. The song was composed in 4/4 time and is performed in the key of G♭ major in common time with a tempo of 140 beats per minute. It was released on digital platforms and to streaming services as a single on 16 June 2017 through East Music Matters.

== Critical reception ==
Upon its release, "Forever is Over" was generally received with positive reviews by music critics. The American website, BroadwayWorld, went on into praising Gjata's "effortless" vocals on the song and labelled it as an "anthem for standing strong through hard times". Another website, NowHearThis, confessed that Gjata "can really sing" and went on saying "there's a lot of feeling in her voice and it helps balance the electronic feel of the musical underlay".

== Music video ==
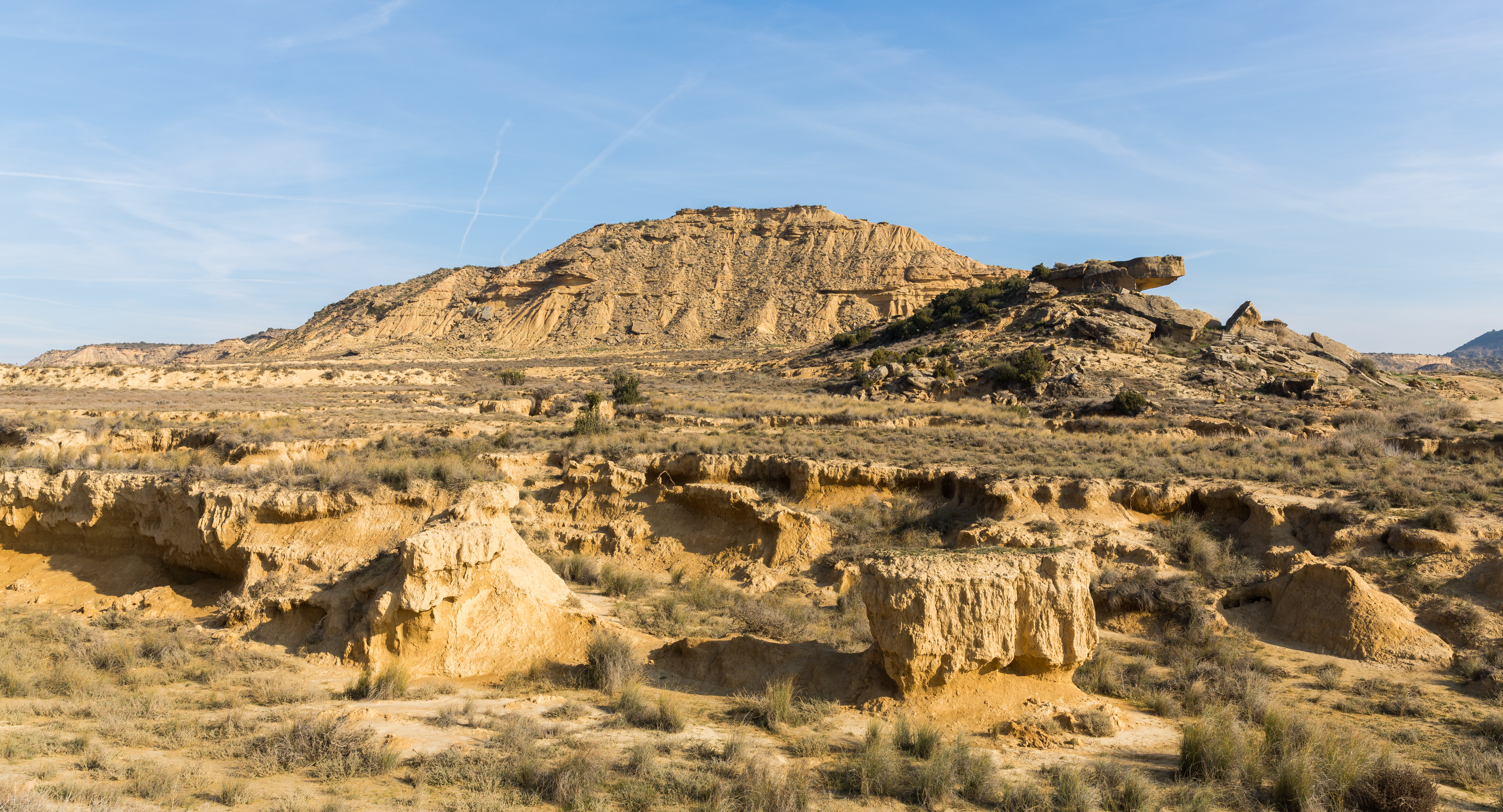
The music video was filmed in Bardenas Reales, northern Spain.

An accompanying music video for "Forever is Over" was premiered to the YouTube channel of Elvana Gjata on 14 June 2017. A behind-the-scenes video followed on 25 November 2017. After approximately two months, the singer premiered an acoustic version of the song on the aforementioned video platform.

The music video for "Forever is Over" was filmed in the semi-desserts of Bardenas Reales, Navarre in northern Spain, and was directed by Richard Paris Wilson from We Are Cowboys, who additionally acted as the director of photography. It opens with a shot over the gullies and cliffs of Bardenas Reales, and Gjata awaking on the ground with a white dress. Following this, she is portrayed by leaving her surrounding on foot until she encounters a mysterious black horse. Over the rest of the music video, the singer is shown performing in a dark room as well as walking across the desert and riding the horse until she arrives to an old abandoned house.

== Personnel ==
Credits adapted from Tidal and YouTube.

- Elvana Gjata – composing, vocals
- David Guetta – composing, producing
- Giorgio Tuinfort – composing, producing
- Poo Bear – composing, producing

== Charts ==
Chart (2017)	Peak position
Albania (The Top List)	1

== Release history ==
Region	Date	Format(s)	Label	Ref.
Various	16 June 2017	Digital download; streaming	East Music Matters	
