= Loti (song) =

2021 single by Elvana Gjata

Single by Elvana Gjata
- Language: Albanian
- Released: 10 June 2021
- Genre: Pop; R&B; urban
- Length: 2:55
- Label: East Music Matters; Loudcom
- Songwriter: Elvana Gjata
- Producer: Jumpa

Elvana Gjata singles chronology
"Thirr" (2021)	"Loti" (2021)	"E di x Marre" (2021)

Music video
- "Loti" on YouTube

"Loti" (Albanian: [lɔˈti]; transl. Tear) is a song by Albanian singer and songwriter Elvana Gjata. The song was composed and written by Gjata, while produced and arranged by German producers Jumpa and Lex Barkey, respectively. Loudcom Media under exclusive license from East Music Matters released it as a single for digital download and streaming on 10 June 2021. Musically, it is an Albanian-language pop, R&B and urban song fusing folk, trap and rock elements, with the lyrics telling a tale of a woman, who loses the intimacy of her loved one. Music critics applauded "Loti", with praise concentrated on its appeal, music video as well as Gjata's musical versatility. Commercially, the song peaked atop the ranking in Albania and reached the top 60 in Switzerland. An accompanying music video was uploaded to Gjata's YouTube channel on 10 June 2021 and was filmed at the Divjakë-Karavasta National Park, Albania.

== Background and composition ==
Gjata teased the premiere of "Loti" by uploading a preview on her social media accounts and announcing that it would be released on 10 June 2021. Lasting two minutes and 55 seconds, Loudcom Media under exclusive license from East Music Matters made the single available on the announced date for digital download and streaming in various countries. "Loti" was composed and written by Gjata herself. German producers Jumpa and Lex Barkey produced and arranged the song, respectively. Musically, "Loti" is an Albanian pop, R&B urban song incorporating folk, trap and rock elements. The Albanian-language song lyrically tells a tale about a woman, who loses the intimacy of her significant other. Lyrics from the song translated into English include: "The price for loving you with my tears, I am washing it out / Could you stop the world for me? If you could love me more than yourself, would you?"

== Reception ==
Upon release, "Loti" was met with widespread acclaim from selected music critics. Albanian music website Illyrian Pirates gave a positive review, applauding its "fresh" appeal and Gjata's "magnetic" vocal performance as well. Zangba Thomson from Bong Mines Entertainment noticed a "heartfelt" narrative and complimented the singer's "ear-pleasing" vocal delivery. In a review for Eurovistan and Eurovision Union, both writers came to a collective conclusion and went on to laud the song's nature as well as the singer's musical versatility, with the latter stating that its melodies give a "traditional, ethnic" feel. Fans of "Loti" include Albanian politician Erion Braçe and Romanian musician Inna. Inna further incorporated the song on her exclusive Apple Music playlist. Commercially, "Loti" reached number two in Albania for the week ending 19 June 2021, and topped the ranking a week later on 26 June. After having trended on the Swiss Spotify and Streaming charts, the single reached number 55 in Switzerland, as the singer's second charting record in the country.

== Promotion ==
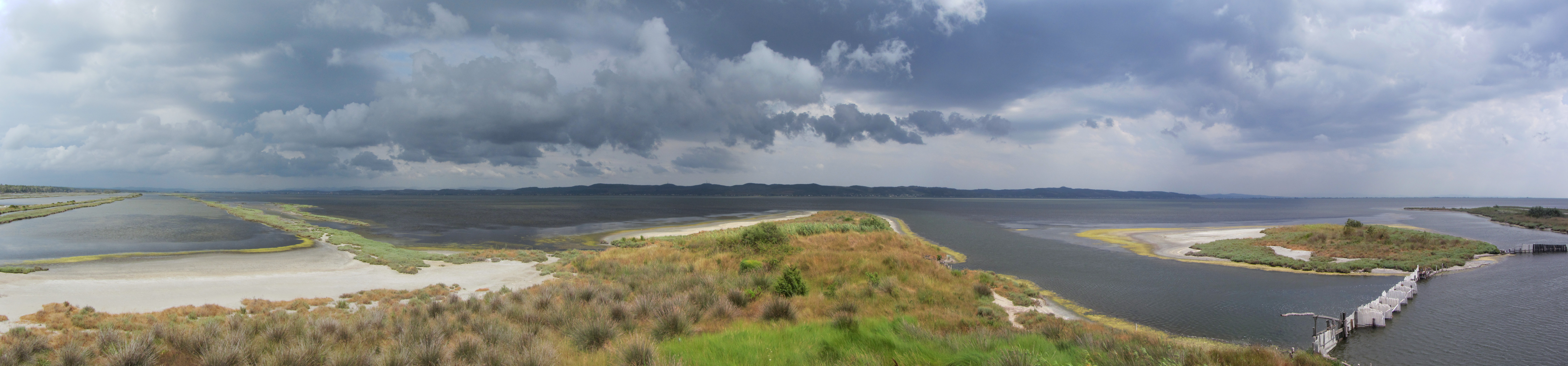
The music video for "Loti" was shot at the Divjakë-Karavasta National Park, Albania.

An accompanying music video for "Loti" was uploaded at 23:59 (CET) to Gjata's official YouTube channel on 10 June 2021, preceded by a teaser released on 9 June. Upon its premiere, the video trended on the YouTube Top 100 chart in Austria, Germany, Norway, Sweden and Switzerland. Filmed at the Divjakë-Karavasta National Park in Albania, it was directed by Albanian content creator Flicka Elisa and visual designer Vasjen Katro. Katro is also credited as the video's editor alongside producer Borin Leka. The reviewer from Illyrian Pirates was enthusiastic towards the clip and called it "stunning", while stating that the visual suited the singer's both appearance and vocal abilities. Labinot Nimani from the publication Albanian Post applauded Gjata's styling and noted "fancy" and "unique" visuals. In December 2022, Gjata performed "Loti" at the eighth season of the Albanian reality show Dancing with the Stars.

== Credits and personnel ==
Credits adapted from Tidal and YouTube.

- Elvana Gjata – composing, songwriting, vocals
- Borin Leka – music video editing
- Flicka Elisa – visual directing
- Jumpa – producing
- Lex Barkey – arranging
- Vasjen Katro – visual directing, editing

== Track listing ==
- Digital download and streaming
1. "Loti" – 2:55

== Weekly charts ==
Weekly chart performance for "Loti"
Chart (2021)	Peak position
Albania (The Top List)	1
Switzerland (Schweizer Hitparade)	55

== Release history ==
Release dates and formats for "Loti"
Region	Date	Format(s)	Label(s)	Ref.
Various	11 June 2021	Digital download; streaming	EMM; Loudcom	
