= Ku Vajti =

2018 single by Elvana Gjata

- The official cover art of "Ku Vajti"

Single by Elvana Gjata
- Language: Albanian
- Released: 20 June 2018
- Length: 2:45
- Label: East Music Matters
- Songwriters: Elvana Gjata, Big Bang
- Producer: Arbër Gjikolli

Elvana Gjata singles chronology
"Off Guard" (2018)	"Ku Vajti" (2018)	"Mike" (2018)

Music video
- "Ku Vajti" on YouTube

"Ku Vajti" (Albanian pronunciation: [ku vaj'ti]; transl. Where did it go) is a song by Albanian singer and songwriter Elvana Gjata. The song was composed and written by Gjata together with Albanian producer Big Bang, who produced the song.

In its love-inspired lyrics, "Ku Vajti" makes reference to a past relationship in which Gjata questions her love interest where their passionate love has gone.

== Background and composition ==
"Ku Vajti" is an Albanian-language song with a duration time of two minutes and forty five seconds. Regarding the music notation, the song was composed in 4/4 time performed in the key of G♭ minor in common time with a moderate tempo of 96 beats per minute. It was written and composed by Gjata herself together with Albanian producer Big Bang who was additionally responsible for the production of the song.

== Critical reception ==
Following its release, "Ku Vajti" was met with favourable reviews from music critics. Shqip FM took into consideration the song's hit potential and also praised its profound message, the choreography and Elvana's emotional delivery. An editor of Top Channel was similarly positive towards the choreography and commended it as "fabulous" and "very rhythmic". However, another editor from TV Klan noticed similarities to the singles "New Rules" and "IDGAF" by English singer Dua Lipa.

== Music video ==
An accompanying music video for "Ku Vajti" officially premiered onto the YouTube channel of Elvana Gjata on 18 June 2018, where it has since amassed a total of more than 38 million views. It was later released on digital platforms and to streaming services as a single on 20 June 2018 through East Music Matters.

== Personnel ==
Credits adapted from YouTube and Tidal.

- Elvana Gjata – composing, songwriting, vocals
- Arbër Gjikolli (Big Bang) – composing, production, songwriting
- Albi Nako – choreography

== Charts ==
Chart (2018)	Peak position
Albania (The Top List)	2

== Release history ==
Region	Date	Format	Label	Ref.
Various	20 June 2018	Digital download; streaming	East Music Matters	
