= Off Guard (song) =

2018 single by Elvana Gjata

Single by Elvana Gjata featuring Ty Dolla Sign
- Released: 6 April 2018
- Length: 3:09
- Label: East Music Matters (EMM); Sony
- Songwriters: Dominic Jordan; Elvana Gjata; Jimmy Giannos; Poo Bear; Ty Dolla Sign
- Producers: The Audibles; Poo Bear

Elvana Gjata singles chronology
"Forever Is Over" (2017)	"Off Guard" (2018)	"Ku Vajti" (2018)

Music video
- "Off Guard" on YouTube

"Off Guard" is a song by Albanian singer Elvana Gjata featuring American singer Ty Dolla Sign. Sony under exclusive license from East Music Matters (EMM) released it as a single for digital download and streaming on 6 April 2018.

== Background and composition ==
Elvana Gjata wrote the song alongside Ty Dolla Sign, Dominic Jordan, Jimmy Giannos and Poo Bear. The production was handled by the latter and The Audibles. Josh Gudwin and Chris G were additionally hired for the song's mixing and mastering process. The song was released as a single through Sony Music under exclusive license from East Music Matters. It is a dance-pop recording incorporating electronic and R&B influences into its sound. The song is entirely performed in the English language, constituting Gjata's second single in the respective language.

== Music video and reception ==
The accompanying music video for the "Off Guard" was announced to be released on 1 April 2018 by a teaser uploaded on Gjata's Facebook profile though it was premiered onto Gjata's YouTube channel simultaneously with the song's release on 6 April 2018. It was directed by American film director Ethan Lader in Venice Beach at Los Angeles, California.

== Personnel ==
Credits adapted from Tidal and YouTube.

- Elvana Gjata – composing, songwriting, vocals
- Chris G – mastering, mixing
- Dominic Jordan – composing, songwriting
- Jimmy Giannos – composing, songwriting
- Josh Gudwin – mastering, mixing
- Poo Bear – composing, producing, songwriting
- The Audibles – producing
- Ty Dolla Sign – composing, songwriting

== Track listing ==
- Digital download
1. "Off Guard" – 3:09

== Charts ==
Chart (2018)	Peak position
Albania (The Top List)	27

== Release history ==
Region	Date	Format(s)	Label	Ref.
Various	6 April 2018	Digital download; streaming	EMM; Sony	
