= Çelu =

2021 extended play by Elvana Gjata

EP by Elvana Gjata
- Released: 16 April 2021
- Length: 19:22
- Label: Loudcom Media; East Music Matters (EMM)
- Producer: Darko Dimitrov

Elvana Gjata chronology
3 (2018)	Çelu (2021)	TRILOGJI (Kapitulli I - GRADA) (2025)

Alternative covers

Çelu (Albanian pronunciation: [tʃɛˈlu]; transl. Open) is the third extended play (EP) by Albanian singer and songwriter Elvana Gjata released on 16 April 2021 by Loudcom Media under exclusive license from East Music Matters (EMM). Gjata contributed significantly to the writing process of Çelu and collaborated extensively with Albanian composer Pirro Çako and Macedonian producer Darko Dimitrov on its songs.

== Background and composition ==
I know we've all had difficult times with ourselves, our families and relatives. Çelu is light and hope to live life!

— Elvana Gjata – during a social media post.

Distributed by Loudcom Media under exclusive license from East Music Matters (EMM), "Çelu" was announced to be released on 16 April 2021 preceded by the extended play's title and its cover on Gjata's official social media two day prior to release. Containing songs written in the Albanian language, the composing, writing and producing process for the record was predominantly handled by Gjata herself along Albanian composer Pirro Çako and Macedonian producer Darko Dimitrov. Albanian producer Andi Islami provided additional mastering and mixing production for the record. Çako and Dimitrov had previously collaborated with the singer on numerous songs and albums, including on her second extended play, 3, in 2018.

== Release and promotion ==
Loudcom Media under exclusive license from East Music Matters (EMM) made "Çelu" available for digital download and streaming in various countries on 16 April 2021. The cover artwork for "Çelu" was shot by Albanian photographer Endrit Mërtiri and portrays a close-up image of Gjata's face in front of a turbulent background while wearing a white jumpsuit designed by American designer Sara Wong. Three songs succeeded "Çelu" in April 2021 to commercial success in Albania. "Drandofilat" peaked at number one in her native country, while both "Kunadhe" and "Mos u ngut" also reached the top 10 at number 4 and 9, respectively. Six music videos, one for each of the song on the extended play except for "Vendi im", were released simultaneously with the release on 16 April at 19:00 (CET). The visuals were directed by Blendi Kalivaçi and edited by Sami Leka, while production was handled by Max Production. Each of the video occurs in the same location but have independent storylines, with Gjata embodying different female characters as well as adopting different looks.

== Personnel ==
Credits adapted from Tidal and YouTube.

- Elvana Gjata – songwriting, vocals
- Andi Islami – mastering, mixing
- Darko Dimitrov – mastering, mixing, producing
- Gent Rushi – instrumentalist
- Pirro Çako – composing
- Shkëlqim Dule – instrumentalist

== Track listing ==
No.	Title	Writer(s)	Composer	Length
1.	"A po vjen"	Elvana Gjata	Pirro Çako	2:59
2.	"Drandofilat"	Elvana Gjata	Pirro Çako	2:23
3.	"Jeta ime"	Elvana Gjata	Pirro Çako	2:31
4.	"Vendi im" (featuring Migena Gjata)	Elvana Gjata	Pirro Çako	3:16
5.	"Kur jemi dasht"	Elvana Gjata	Pirro Çako	2:41
6.	"Kunadhe"	Elvana Gjata	Pirro Çako	2:33
7.	"Mos u ngut"	Elvana Gjata	Pirro Çako	2:55
Total length:				19:22

== Release history ==
Region	Date	Format(s)	Label	Ref.
Various	16 April 2021	Digital download; streaming	Loudcom Media; EMM	
