= Mike (song) =

2018 single by Elvana Gjata and Ledri Vula featuring John Shahu

- The official cover art for "Mike"

Single by Elvana Gjata and Ledri Vula featuring John Shahu
- Language: Albanian
- Released: 4 July 2018
- Genre: Pop
- Length: 3:23
- Label: East Music Matters
- Songwriters: Arber Zeqo; Elvana Gjata; John Shahu; Ledri Vula
- Producer: Arbre Blass

Elvana Gjata singles chronology
"Ku Vajti" (2018)	"Mike" (2018)	"Tavolina e mërzisë" (2019)

Ledri Vula singles chronology
"Princess Diana" (2018)	"Mike" (2018)	"Aje" (2018)

John Shahu singles chronology
"Medicine" (2017)	"Mike" (2018)	"Havana" (2019)

Music video
- "Mike" on YouTube

"Mike" (Albanian pronunciation: [miˈke]; transl. (Girl)friend) is a song recorded by Albanian singer and songwriter Elvana Gjata and Kosovar rapper Ledri Vula featuring Albanian singer John Shahu. It was composed and written by the aforementioned artists together with Arber Zeqo and produced by Arbre Blass. The official music video was uploaded onto YouTube in July 2018.

== Background and composition ==
Having a duration time of three minutes and twenty three seconds, "Mike" was musically described as an Albanian-language pop song incorporating Balkan elements. Lyrically, the song explores the theme of an adolescent romance that is predetermined despite the long distances. It was composed and written by Elvana Gjata, Ledri Vula, John Shahu together with Albanian producer Arber Zeqo. Albanian producer Arbre Blass was additionally hired for the song's production process. According to the latter, it took approximately 250 hours for the complementation of the song.

== Critical reception ==
Music critics gave generally positive responses of "Mike" following its release. An editor of SoundsEuropean was positive towards the singers vocals and song's nature labeling it a "fresh song with a catchy melody". Radio Ferizaj was positive towards Elvana's, Ledri's and Shahu's vocal parts further calling the music video as "phenomenal".

== Music video and promotion ==
An accompanying music video for the song was officially premiered to the YouTube channel of Elvana Gjata, two days before the digital and to streaming release on 2 July 2018. Filmed in Palermo, Italy, it was directed by Besian Durmishi and produced by Adea Kelmendi. East Music Matters released it on digital platforms and streaming services as a single on 4 July 2018.

== Personnel ==
Credits adapted from Tidal and YouTube.

- Elvana Gjata – composing, songwriting, vocals
- Ledri Vula – composing, songwriting, vocals
- John Shahu – composing, songwriting, vocals
- Arber Zeqo – songwriting
- Arbre Blass – production
- Besian Durmishi – video directing
- Adea Kelmendi – video production

== Charts ==
Chart (2018)	Peak position
Albania (The Top List)	2

== Release history ==
Region	Date	Format	Label	Ref.
Various	4 July 2018	Digital download; streaming	East Music Matters	
