= Afër dhe Larg (album) =

Studio album by Elvana Gjata
- Released: 2011
- Label: Threedots Productions
- Producer: Flori Mumajesi

Elvana Gjata chronology
Mamës (2007)	Afër dhe Larg (2011)	Acoustic Live Session (2014)

Afër dhe Larg (Near and Far) is the second studio album by Albanian singer Elvana Gjata. The album received positive reviews by critics and reached a huge success in early 2011. The album contained tracks from Elvana from 2009, after her second album and new songs that were released later that year and the year after.

== Track listing ==
Credits adapted from Genius and Spotify:

No.	Title	Writer(s)	Length
1.	"Me Ty"	Elvana Gjata	3:37
2.	"Afër dhe Larg"	Elvana Gjata; Flori Mumajesi	3:26
3.	"Ku Jeton Dashuria Ime"	Elvana Gjata	3:32
4.	"Gjaku im"	Dalina Buzi	3:47
5.	"Kush Jam Unë"	Elvana Gjata	3:52
6.	"Vetes"	Elvana Gjata	3:53
7.	"Dancehall"	Elvana Gjata	3:41
8.	"Kudo Që Jam"	Elvana Gjata	3:03
9.	"Ake Ti Zemër"	Elvana Gjata	3:33
10.	"Bonus Track Sex On The Beach"	Elvana Gjata	1:53
11.	"Mamani Nejen"	Fugaa; Elvana Gjata	3:33
12.	"Turn U On"	Elvana Gjata; Flori Mumajesi	3:50
13.	"Ti Je"	Elvana Gjata	3:25
14.	"Dhe Zemra Ndal"	Elvana Gjata	4:23
15.	"Dhe Zemra Ndal (RMX)"	Elvana Gjata; Flori Mumajesi	4:14

== Release history ==
Region	Date	Format	Label	Ref.
Various	7 August 2011	Digital download; streaming	Super Sonic	
