= 3 (Elvana Gjata EP) =

EP (live) by Elvana Gjata
- Released: 10 February 2018
- Recorded: 2018
- Label: East Music Matters
- Producers: Darko Dimitrov; Pirro Çako

Elvana Gjata chronology
Acoustic Live Session (2014)	3 (2018)	Çelu (2021)

3 is the second acoustic and live extended play by Albanian singer and songwriter Elvana Gjata. It was released on 10 February 2018 through digital download and streaming outlets. The extended play contains six live and acoustic covers of songs written by Pirro Çako and produced by Darko Dimitrov. It notably includes a poem written by the Albanian Renaissance writer and national poet of Albania, Naim Frashëri. The record incorporates elements of pop folk, pop rock and folk in its production and beats, which marked a significant departure from her previous work. Elvana Gjata published a short documentary film dealing with the journey of the composition of the EP. She additionally held an acoustic performance in Tirana.

== Promotion ==
For promotional purposes, 3 was accompanied by six music videos for its singles respectively, and were premiered onto the YouTube channel of Elvana Gjata one day after the digital release on 11 February 2018. The aforementioned videos were solely directed by Erion Bubullima and produced by the singer's regular collaborator Dalina Buzi, while Florind Tenolli and Shpëtim Baça were hired as the directors of photography.

== Track listing ==
Credits adapted from YouTube.

No.	Title	Writer(s)	Arranger(s)	Length
1.	"Festojmë"	Pirro Çako	Darko Dimitrov	4:18
2.	"Gjërat kanë ndryshuar"	Elvana Gjata; Pirro Çako	Darko Dimitrov	3:22
3.	"Veç një pikë"	Elvana Gjata; Pirro Çako	Darko Dimitrov	3:47
4.	"Më fal"	Elvana Gjata	Darko Dimitrov	2:41
5.	"Ti Shqipëri më jep nder"	Naim Frashëri	Darko Dimitrov	3:21
6.	"Xheloz"	Elvana Gjata; Pirro Çako	Darko Dimitrov	2:49
Total length:				18:98

== Personnel ==
Credits adapted from Tidal.

- Elvana Gjata – composition, performing, vocals
- Pirro Çako – composition, songwriting
- Darko Dimitrov – arrangement

== Release history ==
Region	Date	Format	Label	Ref.
Various	10 February 2018	CD; Digital download; streaming	East Music Matters	

== Charts ==
Chart (2018)	Peak position
Switzerland (iTunes Charts)	27
