= Fustani (song) =

2019 single by Elvana Gjata featuring Capital T

Single by Elvana Gjata featuring Capital T
- Language: Albanian
- English title: "Dress"
- Released: 29 June 2019
- Length: 2:33
- Label: East Music Matters
- Songwriters: Elvana Gjata; Capital T
- Producers: Arbre Blass; Rzon

Elvana Gjata singles chronology
"Tavolina e mërzisë" (2019)	"Fustani" (2019)	"Meine Liebe" (2019)

Capital T singles chronology
"200 Ditë" (2019)	"Fustani" (2019)	"Syt e tu" (2019)

Music video
- "Fustani" on YouTube

"Fustani" (Albanian pronunciation: [fustani]; transl. Dress) is a song recorded by Albanian singer and songwriter Elvana Gjata featuring Kosovo-Albanian rapper Capital T. It was written by both aforementioned artists and produced by Albanian producers Rzon and Arbre Blass. Swedish producer Johan Bejerholm further mastered and mixed the song. An official music video for "Fustani" was shot in Turkey and was uploaded on 29 June 2019 onto YouTube to accompany the single's release. A vibrant video, it features scenes of the pair performing to the song in the outskirts of Istanbul in variety of sets, and Elvana appearing with five different dresses throughout the entire video. The single experienced commercial success in Albania and went on to the country's number one The Top List chart. The record was further promoted by both artists with live performances at the Alba Festival 2019 in Zürich and soon after, at the Sunny Hill Festival 2019 in Pristina.

== Background and composition ==
"Fustani" was solely written by both artists and produced by Albanian producers Rzon and Arbre Blass. Swedish producer Johan Bejerholm was responsible for the song's mastering and mixing process. The song runs for a duration time of two minutes and thirty three seconds. In terms of music notation, it was composed in 4/4 time and is performed in the key of E♭ major with a moderate tempo of 99 beats per minute. The song marks the second collaboration between the duo, following the rapper was featured on "Lejla".

== Music video ==
A screenshot of a scene in the music video portraying Elvana in a gold dress. She further wore five different outfits, created by Valdrin Sahiti, throughout the clip.

An accompanying music video for "Fustani" was premiered onto the official YouTube channel of Elvana Gjata on 29 June 2019, where it has since amassed a total of 30 million views. Upon its release, the video was trending at number one on YouTube in Switzerland. Filmed in the outskirts of Istanbul, it was directed by Turkish director Emir Khalilzadeh of the Astronot Film in Turkey.

The music video opens with both artists performing in a smoke-filled abandoned warehouse separately. In the indoor scene, Elvana appears then with two wings on her head portraying the Albanian double-headed eagle helping to convey the message of the intro. As the video progresses it then opens in a different location with both of them racing each other and stopping afterwards for Elvana to pose in front of the vehicles, wearing a handmade metal chain diamond dress created by Valdrin Sahiti.

In order to promote the single, both artists delivered the first performance for the song at the Alba Festival 2019 in Zürich and after that, at the Sunny Hill Festival 2019 in Pristina.

== Personnel ==
Credits adapted from Tidal and YouTube.

- Elvana Gjata – performing, songwriting, vocals
- Capital T (Trim Ademi) – performing, songwriting, vocals
- Arbre Blass – record production
- Rzon – record production
- BO Beatz – engineering
- Cano Milano – engineering
- Johan Bejerholm – mixing and mastering
- Emir Khalilzadeh – video directing

== Track listing ==
- Digital download
1. "Fustani" – 2:33

== Charts ==
Chart performance for "Fustani"
Chart (2019)	Peak position
Albania (The Top List)	1
Switzerland (Spotify Charts)	50

== Release history ==
Release dates and formats for "Fustani"
Region	Date	Format(s)	Label	Ref.
Various	29 June 2019	Digital download; streaming	East Music Matters	
