= Tavolina e mërzisë =

2019 single by Elvana Gjata

- The official cover art for "Tavolina e mërzisë"

Single by Elvana Gjata
- Released: 27 February 2019
- Genre: Pop
- Length: 2:44
- Label: East Music Matters
- Songwriter: Aida Baraku
- Producer: Armend Rexhepagiqi

Elvana Gjata singles chronology
"Mike" (2018)	"Tavolina e mërzisë" (2019)	"Fustani" (2019)

Music video
- "Tavolina e mërzisë" on YouTube

"Tavolina e mërzisë" (Albanian pronunciation: [tavɔlina ɛ məɾzisə]; transl. Table of sadness) is a song recorded by Albanian singer and songwriter Elvana Gjata. The pop ballad was written and produced by Albanian duo Aida Baraku and Armend Rexhepagiqi, with the arrangement process handled by Macedonian producer Darko Dimitrov. The official music video was uploaded onto YouTube on 26 February 2019 and has accumulated more than 15 million views since its publication. Its lyrical content discuss the way that love can turn abruptly into grief and pain. Critics noted the lyrical theme to be a response to a personal case between Elvana and her former boyfriend.

== Background and composition ==
"Tavolina e mërzisë" performed by Elvana Gjata was written by Kosovo-Albanian musician Aida Baraku and produced by Albanian musician Armend Rexhepagiqi. Macedonian producer Darko Dimitrov was additionally hired for the song's arrangement process. The ballad is performed in the key of D♭ minor in common time with a tempo of 124 beats per minute. Elvana expressed her gratitude through a post on Instagram for working with Aida Baraku and Armend Rexhepagiqi also describing them as the "Legends of Kosovo". Lyrically, the song addresses the end of a toxic relationship between Elvana and her former boyfriend. At the beginning of the song, Elvana sings, "I am there/ Where I fell down/ Where you hit me in the lowest point of the world [...] I am with the pieces of love — In the table of sadness".

== Music video ==
The accompanying music video for the song was premiered onto the YouTube channel of Elvana Gjata on the 26 February 2019, where it has since amassed a total of 15 million views. It was directed by Besian Durmishi, who previously directed her music video for "Mike", while Boubkar Benzabat acted as the director of photography. Adea Kelmendi, Agnesa Kelmendi and Karen Gkiounasian were additionally helmed for the visual production. A remixed version by Kosovo-Albanian producer Cricket was officially released on 28 March 2019.

== Track listing ==
- Digital download
1. "Tavolina e mërzisë" – 2:45
- Digital download (Alternative versions)
1. "Tavolina e mërzisë" (Cricket Remix) – 3:40

== Charts ==
Chart (2019)	Peak position
Albania (The Top List)	1

== Release history ==
Region	Date	Format	Label	Ref.
Various	27 February 2019	Digital download; streaming	East Music Matters	
