= Duple and quadruple metre =

Musical metre

== Duple metre ==
Duple metre (or duple meter in US spelling, also known as duple time) is a musical metre characterized by a primary division of two beats to the bar, usually indicated by 2 and multiples (simple) or 6 and multiples (compound) as the upper figure of the time signature, with 2/2 (cut time, also notated as), 2/4, and fast 6/8 being the most common examples.

Shown below are a simple and a compound duple drum pattern.

Though the upper figure must be divisible by two in duple metre, the inverse is not necessarily true. For instance, in the first movement of Maurice Ravel's Piano Trio, the 8/8 time signature is subdivided as 3+3+2 (three beats) rather than a 4+4 subdivision (two beats, duple metre). The movement is in odd time, not duple metre, even though the upper figure 8 is divisible by two.

Duple time is especially common in marches (especially in American march music), where the duple meter provides a clear upbeat/downbeat feel that is suitable for marching. Duple time is also common in many styles including the polka, well known for its obvious "oom-pah" duple feel. Compare to the waltz, a form in triple metre, where the feel is an "oom-pah-pah" triple feel.

== Quadruple metre ==
Quadruple metre (or quadruple meter in US spelling, also known as quadruple time) is a musical metre characterized in modern practice by a primary division of four beats to the bar, usually indicated by 4 as the upper figure of the time signature, with 4/4 (common time, also notated as) being the most common example.

Shown below are a simple and a compound quadruple drum pattern.

The most common time signature in rock, blues, country, funk, and pop is 4/4. Although jazz writing has become more adventurous since Dave Brubeck's Time Out, the majority of jazz and jazz standards are still in "common time" (4/4).
