= Capital T =

Kosovo-Albanian rapper (born 1991)

- Born: Trim Ademi; 1 March 1991 (age 35); Pristina, SFR Yugoslavia (present-day Kosovo)
- Genres: Hip hop
- Occupations: Rapper; singer; songwriter
- Years active: 2008–present
- Labels: Authentic Entertainment; Folé; Onima; Babastars

Trim Ademi (Albanian: [tɾiˈm ˈadɛˈmi]; born 1 March 1991), known professionally as Capital T, is a Kosovo-Albanian rapper, singer and songwriter. Born and raised in Pristina, he was introduced to music and rap by his uncle at an early age. He rose to prominence in the Albanian-speaking world after the release of his first two albums, Replay (2010) and KAPO (2012).

== Life and career ==
=== 1991–2018: Early life and career beginnings ===
Trim Ademi was born on 1 March 1991 to an Albanian family in the city of Pristina, then part of the Socialist Federal Republic of Yugoslavia, now Kosovo. His father, Agim Ademi (born 19 October 1961), is a former professional footballer and current president of the Football Federation of Kosovo. Ademi attended Asim Vokshi Elementary School and, after graduating, enrolled in the Sami Frashëri High School in Pristina.

Ademi began his early music career in 2008 and debuted with 2po2's single "Shopping" featuring him. In the same year he released his second single "1 Mëngjes" in collaboration with the singer Adelina Thaqi. The following year he released three singles, including "Shum Nalt" in collaboration with 2po2 and Dafina Zeqiri. In 2010, he announced his debut studio album Replay and released it later that year. In the same year, he participated in the 11th edition of Kënga Magjike with the song "Diva" together with Eni Koçi. The singer released his second album 'Kapo in 2012, followed by a mixtape called Slumdog Millionaire in 2015. His second mixtape Winter Is Here was released in 2017 via Authentic Entertainment and achieved commercial success in Switzerland, while debuting at number 69 on the Swiss Album Charts. In June 2016, he won the "Video of the Year" award at the Top Music Awards 2016 for the song "Hitman".

=== 2019–2020: Skulpturë ===
In February 2019, Ademi released the follow-up single "Kujtime", which reached number 22 in Albania. Another pair of chart singles, "Hookah", "200 ditë" and "Akull" followed throughout the year, the latter reaching number two in Albania and number 64 in Switzerland. Ademi released six singles throughout the year, including "Yalla" with German rapper Capital Bra. In July 2019, he collaborated with Albanian singer Elvana Gjata on her number one single "Fustani". In September 2019, he held his first concert titled "Time Capsule" at the Mother Teresa Square in Tirana.

In November 2019, he announced that he had begun work on his forthcoming third studio album, Skulpturë. In January 2020, he released the lead single, "600Ps", from the aforementioned album. His second single from the album, "Je t'aime", followed a month later, in February 2020. In April 2020, he released his third single "FLEX", which was a great success. In May 2020 he released another single called "Flawless". In June 2020 he released a song with Ledri Vula called DMP. In July 2020, Ademi started releasing more songs from the album, such as a feature with Jay1 called "Money", and the second one was "Tu Festu".

=== 2021–present: Heartbroken Kids and continued success ===
Ademi's upcoming fourth studio album, Heartbroken Kids, was released on 24 December 2021. Debuting at number 55 in Albania, "Plan" was released as the album's lead single on 13 December. His follow-up single, "Nashta", was released on 21 December. HBK has 13 songs and features artists such as Mc Kresha, Elinel & Marin.

== Activism ==
Ademi has made contributions to various charitable causes throughout his career. In March 2019, he visited the Down Syndrome Association Kosovo to raise awareness and acceptance to people with the down syndrome. In November 2019, Ademi expressed his condolences via social media following the 6.4 magnitude earthquake in Albania. He subsequently went on to visit Albania to raise funds for rehabilitation, reconstruction and to support several campaigns. In December 2019, Ademi joined the UNDP Kosovo campaign #EcoKosovo, aiming to mobilise the country's population towards a healthier environment. In May 2020, he extended his support to the Black Lives Matter movement in connection with the wider George Floyd protests.

== Discography ==
Studio albums

- Replay (2010)
- Kapo (2012)
- Skulpturë (2020)
- Heartbroken Kids (2021)

Mixtapes

- Slumdog Millionaire (2015)
- Winter Is Here (2017)
