= Ledri Vula =

Kosovο-Albanian rapper (born 1986)

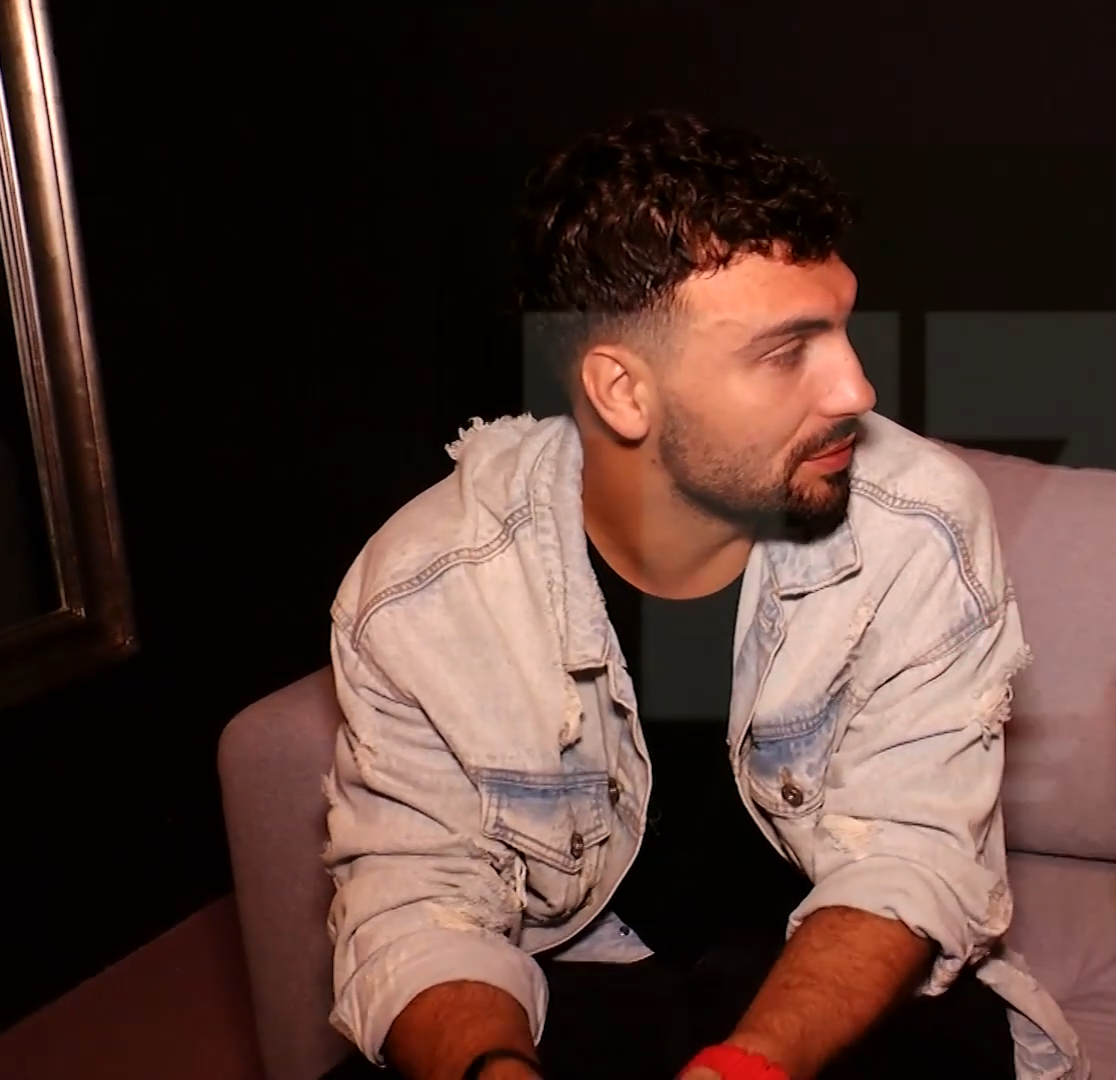
- Vula in 2019

Background information
- Born: Ledri Vula; 10 July 1986 (age 40); Pristina, SFR Yugoslavia (present-day Kosovo)
- Genre: Hip hop
- Occupations: Rapper; singer; songwriter
- Years active: 2005–present
- Formerly of: Skillz; Babastars

Ledri Vula (Albanian: [lɛˈdɾi vuˈla]; born 10 July 1986) is a Kosovo-Albanian rapper, singer and songwriter.

== Life and career ==
Ledri Vula was born on 10 July 1986 in the city of Pristina, then part of the Socialist Federal Republic of Yugoslavia, present Kosovo. His father is television producer Agron Vula who is from Gjakova and his mother is journalist and television personality Xheraldina Vula, who originally comes from Ulcinj, Montenegro. In 2005, he rose to prominence as one of the member of the hip hop duo Skillz. In 2012, the rise of his own stardom eventually led to the dissolution of the duo. In 2014, Vula launched his solo career starting off in December that year with the release of his debut single "100 Probleme". He also played for the Kosovan basketball team KB RTV21.

In 2016, he won the My Music Hit of the Year Award at the Top Music Awards 2016. In 2019, he performed at the Sunny Hill Festival in Pristina sharing a stage with other acclaimed artists such as Calvin Harris, Miley Cyrus and Dua Lipa.

In January 2020, Vula announced his debut studio album, 10/10, to be released later that year. In February 2020, he premiered his follow-up singles "Piano Rap" and "Prej Inati", whereas during the summer he premiered two other songs where both of them where features, the first one was "DMP" featuring Capital T, and "Aman" featuring Lumi B & Dafina Zeqiri.

In May 2023, Vula released his second studio album 1 gotë per Ty.

== Activism ==
Following the earthquake in Albania on 26 November 2019, Vula and his family offered immediate relief activities and the family-owned residences in Pristina to the families and victims affected by the seismicity. In May 2020, he expressed his support to the Black Lives Matter movement in connection with the wider George Floyd protests. Later that year, he extended his support to the Albanian campaign, Liria ka emër, which was created following the confirmation of an indictment on war crimes against several Albanian figures of the Kosovo Liberation Army (UÇK) by the Specialist Chambers in The Hague.

== Discography ==
- 10/10 (2020)
