= Mozzik discography =

- Studio albums: 2
- Collaborative albums: 1
- Singles as lead artist: 46
- Singles as featured artist: 5

Kosovo-Albanian rapper Mozzik has released two studio albums, a collaborative album, 42 singles as a lead artist and 5 as a featured artist.

== Albums ==
=== Studio albums ===
List of studio albums, with selected chart positions
Title	Details	Peak chart positions	
Title	Details	AUT	SWI
Mozzart	Released: 30 July 2020; Label: 2 Euro Gang, Urban; Formats: Digital download, streaming	75	11
Lamboziki	Released: 14 February 2022; Label: 2 Euro Gang, Urban; Formats: Digital download, streaming	—	42
"—" denotes a recording that did not chart or was not released in that territory.

Mergimstar (2024)

=== Collaborative albums ===
List of collaborative albums, with selected chart positions
Title	Album details	Peak chart positions		
Title	Album details	AUT	GER	SWI
No Rich Parents (with Loredana)	Released: 24 September 2021; Label: Independent; Formats: CD, digital download, streaming	8	29	5
"—" denotes a recording that did not chart or was not released in that territory.

== Singles ==
=== As lead artist ===
==== 2010s ====
List of singles in the 2010s decade, with selected chart positions and certifications
Title	Year	Peak chart positions				Certifications	Album
Title	Year	ALB	AUT	GER	SWI	Certifications	Album
"Oksigjen Remix"	2012	—	—	—	—	None	Non-album singles
"Kuku"	2014	—	—	—	—	None	Non-album singles
"Ik"	2014	—	—	—	—	None	Non-album singles
"T'kan rrejt"	2014	—	—	—	—	None	Non-album singles
"Edhe njo" (featuring Enca)	2014	—	—	—	—	None	Non-album singles
"Koke shum"	2015	—	—	—	—	None	Non-album singles
"Premtimet" (featuring Kida)	2015	—	—	—	—	None	Non-album singles
"Ama dorën" (featuring Xhensila)	2015	7	—	—	—	None	Non-album singles
"Dhezu"	2015	3	—	—	—	None	Non-album singles
"Mra pika" (featuring Enis Bytyqi)	2016	—	—	—	—	None	Non-album singles
"Cocaina"	2016	—	—	—	—	None	Non-album singles
"Golden Eagle"	2017	—	—	—	—	None	Non-album singles
"Me Hile"	2017	—	—	—	—	None	Non-album singles
"Kuks"	2017	—	—	—	—	None	Non-album singles
"Xhelozia"	2017	—	—	—	—	None	Non-album singles
"Ti Amo" (with Veysel)	2018	—	54	42	10	BVMI: Gold	Non-album singles
"Bonnie & Clyde" (featuring Loredana)	2018	—	3	3	2	IFPI AUT: Gold	Non-album singles
"Pa Pa"	2018	—	—	—	—	None	Non-album singles
"Para Siempre" (featuring Getinjo)	2018	—	—	—	—	None	Non-album singles
"Ghetto"	2018	—	—	—	—	None	Non-album singles
"Nana"	2018	—	—	—	—	None	Non-album singles
"Romeo & Juliet" (with Loredana)	2019	—	4	2	4	None	Non-album singles
"Pinocchio" (featuring Luciano)	2019	—	—	—	—	None	Non-album singles
"Dhelper Dinake"	2019	—	—	—	16	None	Mozzart
"Zemra Ime"	2019	12	—	—	97	None	Mozzart
"—" denotes a recording that did not chart or was not released in that territory.

==== 2020s ====
List of singles in the 2020s decade, with selected chart positions
Title	Year	Peak chart positions					Album
Title	Year	ALB	AUT	GER	SWI	WW	Album
"Edhe ti" (with Tayna)	2020	2	—	90	26	—	Non-album singles
"Auf Wiedersehen"	2020	—	6	11	6	—	Mozzart
"Tom & Jerry"	2020	—	—	—	—	—	Mozzart
"Lass mal"	2020	—	39	34	39	—	Mozzart
"Madonna"	2020	1	—	—	38	—	Mozzart
"Baby"	2020	—	—	78	64	—	Mozzart
"El Chapo" (with Getinjo)	2020	—	—	—	—	—	Non-album singles
"N'Tiranë"	2021	—	—	—	—	—	Non-album singles
"Rosenkrieg" (with Loredana)	2021	13	5	1	2	146	No Rich Parents
"Oh Digga" (with Loredana)	2021	6	44	27	27	—	No Rich Parents
"Dashni me Photoshop"	2021	—	—	—	—	—	No Rich Parents
"Nese don" (with Loredana)	2021	3	22	10	16	—	No Rich Parents
"Mit mir" (with Loredana)	2021	—	18	12	13	—	No Rich Parents
"Immer wenn es regnet" (with Loredana)	2021	—	31	19	23	—	No Rich Parents
"Bonjour Madame" (featuring Noizy)	2021	—	—	—	14	—	Lamboziki
"Shko"	2021	5	—	—	—	—	Lamboziki
"Ska" (with Elvana Gjata)	2022	3	—	—	33	—	Lamboziki
"Toto Rina" (with Getinjo)	2022	—	—	—	—	—	Non-album singles
"Pare" (with Butrint Imeri and Tayna)	2022	—	—	—	11	—	Non-album singles
"Bespreme"	2022	—	—	—	—	—	Non-album singles
"Të dua"	2022	—	—	—	—	—	Non-album singles
"—" denotes a recording that did not chart or was not released in that territory.

=== As featured artist ===
List of singles as featured artist, with selected chart positions and certifications
Title	Year	Peak chart positions				Certifications	Album
Title	Year	ALB	AUT	GER	SWI	Certifications	Album
"Eiskalt" (Loredana featuring Mozzik)	2019	37	2	2	7	BVMI: Gold; IFPI AUT: Gold	King Lori
"A Milly" (Dardan featuring Mozzik)	2019	53	22	19	20	None	Sorry
"Paranoia" (Kida featuring Mozzik)	2020	—	—	—	44	None	Non-album single
"Pishmon" (Kida featuring Mozzik)	2020	—	—	—	81	None	Non-album single
"Për ty" (Dardan and Nimo featuring Mozzik)	2021	—	—	14	14	None	Emerald
"—" denotes a recording that did not chart or was not released in that territory.

=== Other charted songs ===
List of other charted songs, with selected chart positions
Title	Year	Peak chart positions	Album
Title	Year	ALB	Album
"Ye Ye"	2022	60	Lamboziki
"Patrolla"	2022	41	Lamboziki
"A po rrin"	2022	57	Lamboziki
"Kriminela"	2022	41	Lamboziki
"—" denotes a recording that did not chart or was not released in that territory.
