= Dafina Zeqiri discography =

- Studio albums: 4
- EPs: 1

Kosovo-Albanian singer Dafina Zeqiri has released four studio albums, one extended play and numerous singles as a lead artist and featured artist.

== Studio albums ==
List of studio albums, with selected chart positions
Title	Album details	Peak chart positions
Title	Album details	SWI
Knock Down	Released: 2008	—
Just Me	Released: 18 December 2011	—
Dafinë moj	Released: 1 October 2021; Label: Bzzz Entertainment, Moneyz; Formats: Digital download and streaming	27
The Absolute Vol.1	Released: 25 January 2024; Label: Moneyz, Yellowcake; Formats: Digital download and streaming	—
"—" denotes a recording that did not chart or was not released in that territory.

== Extended plays ==
List of extended plays
Title	EP details
King	Released: 2017; Formats: Digital download and streaming

== Singles ==
=== As lead artist ===
List of singles as lead artist, with selected chart positions
Title	Year	Peak chart positions	Album
Title	Year	SWI	Album
"Rrallë e përmallë"	2007	—	Non-album single
"Adios"	2008	—	Knockdown
"Knockdown" (featuring Hekuran Krasniqi)	2008	—	Knockdown
"Baterite"	2008	—	Non-album single
"Dua që ta di"	2009	—	Just Me
"Amazing Girl"	2009	—	Just Me
"Rock This Club"	2010	—	Just Me
"Pom pëlqen" (featuring Ledri Vula)	2010	—	Just Me
"Dangerously In Love"	2011	—	Just Me
"My Swag"	2011	—	Just Me
"Supernova"	2011	—	Just Me
"Tonight" (featuring Ledri Vula)	2012	—	Just Me
"Veq ti"	2013	—	Non-album singles
"Your Love"	2013	—	Non-album singles
"Bloodah"	2013	—	Non-album singles
"Time Out"	2013	—	Non-album singles
"Hajde ma knej"	2014	—	Non-album singles
"MSD" (featuring Gjiko)	2014	—	Non-album singles
"Got Ur Back" (featuring Ledri Vula)	2014	—	Non-album singles
"Ndjenjë tjetër"	2014	—	Non-album singles
"Shumë qef"	2015	—	Non-album singles
"Te ti"	2015	—	Non-album singles
"Rude Girl" (with Dj Flow featuring Lumi B)	2015	—	Non-album singles
"Liri" (featuring Mixey)	2016	—	Non-album singles
"Na" (featuring Kaos)	2016	—	Non-album singles
"Four Seasons"	2017	—	King Ep
"Told Ya"	2017	—	King Ep
"Ti e din"	2017	—	Non-album singles
"Fuego"	2018	—	Non-album singles
"Kalon" (featuring Lumi B)	2018	—	Non-album singles
"Kurgjo nuk kallxojna"	2018	—	Non-album singles
"Alo" (featuring DJ Geek)	2018	—	Non-album singles
"A e man n'men"	2019	—	Non-album singles
"Rofe"	2019	—	Non-album singles
"La Reina"	2019	—	Non-album singles
"Lule Lule" (featuring Lumi B)	2019	—	Non-album singles
"Bye Bye" (featuring Tayna)	2019	—	Non-album singles
"Kapma doren" (featuring Lurro)	2019	—	Non-album singles
"Ring Ring" (featuring Varrosi)	2019	—	Non-album singles
"Vuj Vuj Vuj"	2019	—	Non-album singles
"Merri krejt"	2020	—	Non-album singles
"A je pendu" (featuring Cricket)	2020	—	Non-album singles
"Aman" (featuring Ledri Vula and Lumi B)	2020	79	Non-album singles
"Million $"	2020	82	Non-album singles
"Zili Zili"	2020	—	Non-album singles
"Mos shko" (featuring Yll Limani)	2020	—	Non-album singles
"Duro"	2021	95	Non-album singles
"Japa"	2021	—	Non-album singles
"Happy Birthday"	2021	—	Non-album singles
"Llafe Llafe" (featuring Lyrical Son)	2021	30	Dafinë moj
"Karma"	2021	—	Dafinë moj
"Dashni" (featuring Muma)	2022	34	Non-album singles
"Faj" (with Elinel)	2022	—	Non-album singles
"Luje belin" (with Kida)	2022	49	Non-album singles
"Malli"	2022	—	Non-album singles
"Dhimbje dhimbje"	2022	—	Non-album singles
"Copa copa" (featuring Alban Skënderaj)	2022	50	Non-album singles
"Ai me mu so" (with Kida)	2022	—	Non-album singles
"Nafije (Remix)" (with DJ Geek, MC Kresha and Young Zerka)	2023	—	Non-album singles
"Unë jom ajo" (Note: "Unë jom ajo" and "Caviar" share one music video uploaded on YouTube.)	2023	94	Non-album singles
"Caviar"	2023	—	Non-album singles
"Harroj" (with Cricket)	2023	—	Non-album singles
"Nasty" (with Ya Nina)	2023	—	Non-album singles
"See Me" (with Ya Nina)	2023	—	Non-album singles
"See Me" (with Ya Nina)	2023	—	Non-album singles
"Fuxk You" (with Rzon)	2023	—	Non-album singles
"Kaje" (with Yll Limani)	2023	—	Non-album singles
"Dasma	2023	—	Non-album singles
"E Para/I Pari" (with Alban Skënderaj)	2023	—	Non-album singles
"Flaka" (with Geasy)	2023	—	Non-album singles
"Si Mua" (featuring Elgit Doda)	2023	57	Non-album singles
"A M'ke Dasht?" (with Elinel)	2023	—	Non-album singles
"Xhane Xhane" (featuring Bruno and Klajdi Haruni)	2023	—	Non-album singles
"Pahiri" (with Mozzik)	2023	30	The Absolute Vol.1
"Une Të Du" (featuring Afrim Muçiqi)	2023	—	The Absolute Vol.1
"—" denotes a recording that did not chart or was not released in that territory.

=== As featured artist ===
List of singles as featured artist, with selected chart positions
Title	Year	Album
"Një ditë tek ti" (Gold AG featuring Dafina Zeqiri)	2007	Non-album singles
"Shum Nalt" (Capital T featuring 2po2 and Dafina Zeqiri)	2009	Non-album singles
"Vibe" (2po2 featuring Tuna and Dafina Zeqiri)	2010	Non-album singles
"Mos E Nal" (Dj Blunt and Real 1 featuring Dafina Zeqiri)	2013	Non-album singles
"Veq me t'pas ty" (Dj Blunt and Real 1 featuring Dafina Zeqiri)	2014	Non-album singles
"A Don Love?" (Noizy featuring Dafina Zeqiri)	2018	Non-album singles
"Désolé por favor" (Dj Hamida featuring Aymane Serhani and Dafina Zeqiri)	2019	Non-album singles
"Një here në jetë" (Cricket featuring Dafina Zeqiri)	2020	Non-album singles
"Pa ty" (Cricket featuring Muma and Dafina Zeqiri)	2021	Non-album singles
"Thirr Policinë" (Arilena Ara featuring Dafina Zeqiri)	2021	Pop Art
"Më fal" (Majk featuring Dafina Zeqiri)	2022	Non-album single
