= Ledri Vula discography =

- Studio albums: 2
- Singles: 53
- Singles as featured artist: 13

Kosovar rapper Ledri Vula has released two studio albums, 53 singles as a lead artist and 13 as a featured artist.

== Albums ==
=== Studio albums ===
| Title | Details | Peak chart positions |
| Title | Details | SWI |
|---|---|---|
| 10/10 | Released: 13 March 2020; Label: Loudcom Media; Format: Digital download, streaming | 20 |
| 1 Goat për ty | Released: 24 May 2023; Label: Onima; Format: Digital download, streaming | 76 |

== Singles ==
=== As lead artist ===
==== 2010s ====
List of singles in the 2010s decade, with selected chart positions
| Title | Year | Peak chart positions | Album |
| Title | Year | ALB | Album |
|---|---|---|---|
| "100 Probleme" | 2014 | — | Non-album single |
| "Hallakama" | 2014 | — | Non-album single |
| "Got ur back" (with Dafina Zeqiri featuring Dj Sardi) | 2014 | — | Non-album single |
| "Ni got për ty" | 2014 | — | Non-album single |
| "Tavolina" (with Ermal Fejzullahu and Lumi B) | 2014 | — | Non-album single |
| "Shko" (with Ermal Fejzullahu and Lumi B) | 2015 | — | Non-album single |
| "SRMN" | 2015 | 1 | Non-album single |
| "Kings" | 2016 | 1 | Non-album single |
| "Nuk ma la" (featuring Flori Mumajesi) | 2016 | 2 | Non-album single |
| "A jena mirë" | 2016 | 2 | Non-album single |
| "Krejt shokt e mi" (featuring Lumi B) | 2017 | 3 | Non-album single |
| "U harrum" | 2017 | 1 | Non-album single |
| "Nona" (featuring Young Zerka) | 2017 | — | Non-album single |
| "Mbi re" (with Buta) | 2017 | 17 | Non-album single |
| "TTZ" | 2017 | 5 | Non-album single |
| "1 Janari" | 2017 | 17 | Non-album single |
| "I vogël" | 2018 | 4 | Non-album single |
| "Merri merri" (with Buta) | 2018 | 1 | Non-album single |
| "Princess Diana" (featuring Lyrical Son) | 2018 | 3 | Non-album single |
| "Mike" (with Elvana Gjata featuring John Shahu) | 2018 | 2 | Non-album single |
| "Aje" (with Tayna) | 2018 | 2 | Non-album single |
| "Rio" | 2019 | 2 | Non-album single |
| "Kiss Kiss" (with Lumi B) | 2019 | 1 | Non-album single |
| "MEM" | 2019 | 4 | Non-album single |
"—" denotes a recording that did not chart or was not released in that territory.

==== 2020s ====
List of singles in the 2020s decade, with selected chart positions
| Title | Year | Peak chart positions | | Album |
| Title | Year | ALB | SWI | Album |
|---|---|---|---|---|
| "Piano Rap" | 2020 | 1 | — | 10/10 |
| "Prej inati" | 2020 | 5 | — | 10/10 |
| "10/10" | 2020 | 1 | — | 10/10 |
| "Alien" | 2020 | 16 | — | 10/10 |
| "100" (with Lyrical Son and Singullar) | 2020 | — | — | 10/10 |
| "Ha ha ha" (with Vig Poppa) | 2020 | — | — | 10/10 |
| "Trëndafil i zi" | 2020 | — | — | 10/10 |
| "Gjiganta" (with MC Kresha) | 2020 | — | — | 10/10 |
| "Sot sot sot" | 2020 | — | — | Non-album single |
| "Don mo" | 2021 | 1 | — | Non-album single |
| "Dale" (with Butrint Imeri and Kida) | 2021 | — | 13 | Non-album single |
| "Ça bone" (with Lumi B and Gjiko) | 2021 | — | — | Non-album single |
| "Hala" (with Tayna) | 2021 | — | — | Non-album single |
| "Lockdown" | 2022 | 5 | — | Non-album single |
| "Tdu" (with Kida) | 2022 | — | 34 | Non-album single |
| "Monaco" | 2022 | — | — | Non-album single |
| "Gelato" (with Ardian Bujupi) | 2022 | — | 68 | Non-album single |
| "A m'ke dasht" (with Melinda Ademi) | 2022 | — | — | Non-album single |
| "Tonat" (with Yll Limani) | 2022 | — | 97 | Non-album single |
| "Uma Love" (with Lumi B and Nuk) | 2022 | — | — | Non-album single |
| "Robot" | 2022 | — | — | 1 Goat për ty |
| "Rebele" (with Rzon) | 2023 | — | — | Who is Rzon |
| "Përshëndetje hejter" | 2023 | — | — | 1 Goat për ty |
| "1 Goat për ty" | 2023 | — | — | 1 Goat për ty |
| "Prek" | 2023 | — | — | 1 Goat për ty |
| "Boom Boom" (with Mozzik) | 2023 | — | — | 1 Goat për ty |
| "Yjet dalin natën" (with Capital T and Majk) | 2023 | — | — | Non-album single |
| "Walk away" (with Buta, Lumi B and Singi) | 2023 | — | — | 1 Goat për ty |
| "E keni dit" (with Romeo Veshaj featuring Klement) | 2023 | — | — | Non-album single |
"—" denotes a recording that did not chart or was not released in that territory.

=== As featured artist ===
List of singles as featured artist, with selected chart positions
| Title | Year | Peak chart positions | | Album |
| Title | Year | ALB | SWI | Album |
|---|---|---|---|---|
| "Pom pëlqen" (Dafina Zeqiri featuring Ledri Vula) | 2010 | — | — | Non-album single |
| "Nese m'don ti (Remix)" (DJ Blunt and Real 1 featuring Ledri Vula) | 2014 | — | — | Non-album single |
| "Shume Pis" (Era Istrefi featuring Ledri Vula) | 2015 | 15 | — | Non-album single |
| "Hip hop" (MC Kresha and Lyrical Son featuring Ledri Vula) | 2016 | 1 | — | Non-album single |
| "Beautiful" (Flori Mumajesi featuring Ledri Vula) | 2016 | 1 | — | Non-album single |
| "E premte" (2po2 featuring Ledri Vula) | 2016 | — | — | Non-album single |
| "Dje & sot" (Noizy featuring Ledri Vula) | 2017 | — | — | Non-album single |
| "Shtrejt" (Gjiko featuring Lumi B and Ledri Vula) | 2017 | — | — | Non-album single |
| "Nasty girl" (EAZ featuring XEN and Ledri Vula) | 2018 | — | 40 | Non-album single |
| "That's mine" (Gashi featuring Ledri Vula) | 2019 | — | 41 | Non-album single |
| "M'ke harru" (Ermal Fejzullahu featuring Ledri Vula) | 2019 | — | — | Non-album single |
| "DMP" (Capital T featuring Ledri Vula) | 2020 | 1 | 85 | Non-album single |
| "Aman" (Dafina Zeqiri featuring Lumi B and Ledri Vula) | 2020 | 4 | 79 | Non-album single |
| "—" denotes a recording that did not chart or was not released in that territory. | | | | Non-album single |
