= Noizy discography =

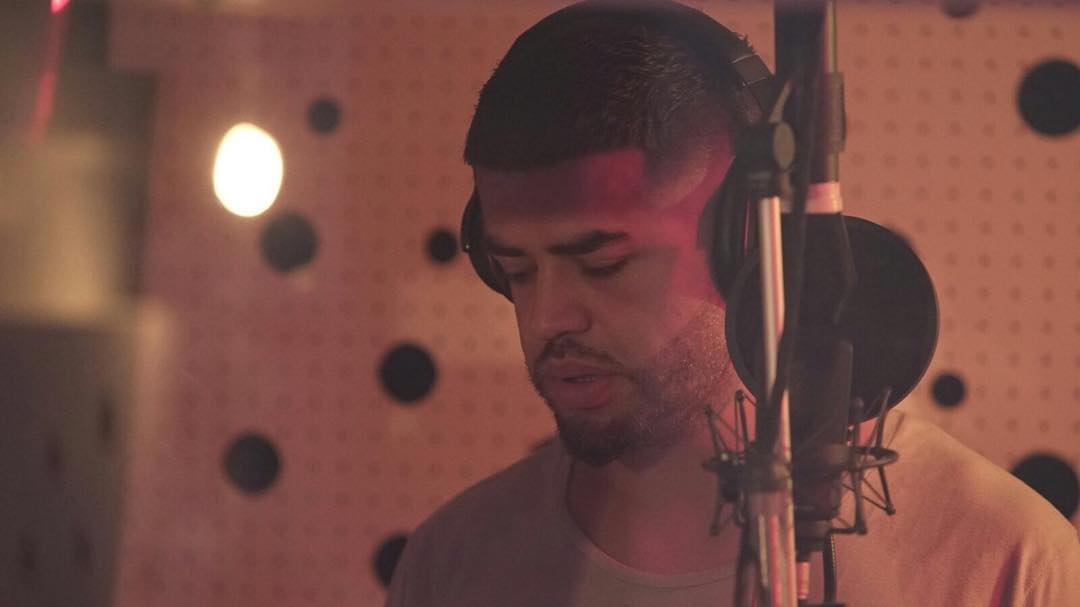
- Studio albums: 5
- Mixtapes: 3

Albanian rapper Noizy has released five studio albums, three mixtapes and numerous singles as a lead artist and featured artist.

== Albums ==
=== Studio albums ===
List of studio albums, with selected chart positions
Title	Album details	Peak chart positions	
Title	Album details	AUT	SWI
Pak Më Ndryshe	Released: 2009; Label: OTR; Formats: Digital download, streaming	—	—
The Leader	Released: 2013; Label: OTR; Formats: Digital download, streaming	—	—
The Hardest in the Market	Released: 2014; Label: OTR; Formats: Digital download, streaming	—	—
Zin City	Released: 29 March 2016; Label: OTR; Formats: Digital download, streaming	—	—
Epoka	Released: 3 April 2020; Label: OTR, Universal; Formats: Digital download, streaming	—	32
Alpha	Released: 7 April 2023; Label: OTR, Ventura; Formats: Digital download, streaming	55	2
"—" denotes a recording that did not chart or was not released in that territory.

=== Mixtapes ===
Title	Album details
Most Wanted	Released: 2010; Label: OTR; Formats: CD, digital download
Living Your Dream	Released: 2011; Label: OTR; Formats: CD, digital download
Do You Remember Me	Released: 2012; Label: OTR; Formats: CD, digital download

== Singles ==
=== As lead artist ===
==== 2000s ====
List of singles in the 2000s decade
Title	Year	Album
"Jemi OTR"	2006	Non-album singles
"Kështu e bejmë ne"	2006	Non-album singles
"Kur vijm na" (featuring J-No and Decee)	2007	Non-album singles
"Veç për ty"	2007	Non-album singles
"Jashtë kontrrollit" (featuring Shadow Fg No and Gissi)	2008	Non-album singles
"Kthehëm tek ti" (featuring Ani)	2008	Non-album singles
"Histori e gjat"	2009	Non-album singles
"Fly" (featuring Rozana Radi)	2009	Non-album singles

==== 2010s ====
List of singles in the 2010s decade, with selected chart positions and certifications
Title	Year	Peak chart positions				Certifications	Album
Title	Year	ALB	AUT	GER	SWI	Certifications	Album
"Mr. Yesterday" (featuring Rozana Radi)	2010	—	—	—	—	none	Non-album singles
"Whats Up" (featuring Lil Koli)	2010	—	—	—	—	none	Non-album singles
"My Lady"	2010	—	—	—	—	none	Non-album singles
"Dridhet vëndi"	2010	—	—	—	—	none	Non-album singles
"So Hot" (with Eni Koçi)	2011	—	—	—	—	none	Non-album singles
"Shooting Star"	2011	—	—	—	—	none	Non-album singles
"Na jena O.T.R." (featuring Sekondari)	2012	—	—	—	—	none	Do You Remember Me?
"Rude Boy"	2012	—	—	—	—	none	Do You Remember Me?
"Çunat e natës"	2012	—	—	—	—	none	Do You Remember Me?
"100 vjet shtet"	2012	—	—	—	—	none	Non-album single
"No Worries"	2013	—	—	—	—	none	The Leader
"Gunz Up"	2013	—	—	—	—	none	The Leader
"Dite e nat" (featuring Nolian Otr)	2013	—	—	—	—	none	The Leader
"Ke ngju për mu"	2014	—	—	—	—	none	The hardest in the Market
"Zemër" (featuring Niil-B and Overlord)	2014	—	—	—	—	none	Non-album single
"Betta Den Dem"	2014	—	—	—	—	none	The hardest in the Market
"Take a Picture" (featuring Lil Koli, Lumi B, Varrosi and MC Kresha)	2014	—	—	—	—	none	Non-album singles
"Gipsy Lover" (featuring Altin Sulku)	2014	—	—	—	—	none	Non-album singles
"Big Body Benzo"	2015	—	—	—	—	none	Zin City
"Vetëm ti je" (featuring Elgit Doda)	2015	—	—	—	—	none	Non-album singles
"Number One"	2015	5	—	—	—	none	Non-album singles
"30 Vet"	2015	7	—	—	—	none	Non-album singles
"Grande"	2016	1	—	—	—	none	Zin City
"Not Gonna Talk"	2016	—	—	—	—	none	Zin City
"Shut The Place Down" (featuring Varrosi)	2016	3	—	—	—	none	Zin City
"Ju njoh mir"	2016	—	—	—	—	none	Zin City
"Flight Mode" (featuring Lil Koli)	2016	—	—	—	—	none	Zin City
"The Baddest"	2016	1	—	—	—	none	Zin City
"Pa mu" (featuring Elgit Doda)	2016	—	—	—	—	none	Zin City
"Më shum se dollar" (featuring Çiljeta)	2016	—	—	—	—	none	Zin City
"Midis Tirone"	2016	—	—	—	—	none	Non-album singles
"A të kujtohet"	2016	—	—	—	—	none	Non-album singles
"Young Boy"	2017	—	—	—	—	none	Non-album singles
"100 kile"	2017	—	—	—	—	none	Non-album singles
"Ak47"	2017	—	—	—	—	none	Non-album singles
"Dje & Sot" (featuring Ledri Vula)	2017	—	—	—	—	none	Non-album singles
"Bora"	2017	—	—	—	—	none	Non-album singles
"Gjuha e kampionit"	2018	—	—	—	—	none	Non-album singles
"Mbretëresha ime"	2018	—	—	—	—	none	Non-album singles
"No Drama" (featuring Rimz)	2018	—	—	—	—	none	Non-album singles
"Luj edhe pak"	2018	—	—	—	—	none	Non-album singles
"Toto" (featuring RAF Camora)	2018	—	2	18	4	IFPI AUT: Gold; BVMI: Gold; IFPI SWI: Gold	Non-album singles
"Peace & Love"	2018	—	—	—	—	none	Non-album singles
"Parku i lojrave" (featuring Ghali)	2018	—	—	—	—	none	Non-album singles
"Meksikane" (featuring Varrosi)	2018	—	—	—	—	none	Non-album singles
"Po thu" (featuring S4MM)	2018	—	—	—	—	none	Non-album singles
"Boss Man" (featuring Lil Koli)	2018	—	—	—	—	none	Non-album singles
"A don love?" (featuring Dafina Zeqiri)	2018	—	—	—	—	none	Non-album singles
"New Benz" (featuring Snik)	2019	—	—	—	—	none	Non-album singles
"Nuk kan besu"	2019	—	—	—	—	none	Epoka
"Kallabllak"	2019	—	—	—	—	none	Epoka
"—" denotes a recording that did not chart or was not released in that territory.

==== 2020s ====
List of singles in the 2020s decade, with selected chart positions
Title	Year	Peak chart positions							Album
Title	Year	AUT	GER	GRE Int.	IND Int.	SWE	SWI	TUR Int. Air.	Album
"Rapstar"	2020	—	—	—	*	—	—	—	Non-album singles
"Nuk je bad"	2020	—	—	—	*	—	—	—	Non-album singles
"All Dem Talk" (featuring Gzuz and Dutchavelli)	2020	21	25	—	*	—	16	—	Non-album singles
"Digital Love"	2020	—	—	—	*	—	—	—	Non-album singles
"Party Turn Up"	2020	—	—	—	*	—	—	—	Non-album singles
"1 Herë e mirë (Vaccine)"	2021	—	—	—	*	—	—	—	Non-album singles
"Freestyle"	2021	—	—	—	*	—	—	—	Non-album singles
"Ti ti" (featuring Elgit Doda)	2021	—	—	—	*	—	—	—	Non-album singles
"Tunde"	2021	—	—	—	—	—	—	—	Non-album singles
"Te lagja" (with Lil Koli and Varrosi)	2021	—	—	—	—	—	—	—	Non-album singles
"Alles gut" (featuring Dardan)	2022	27	23	—	—	—	11	—	Non-album singles
"Dhimbje"	2022	—	—	—	—	—	—	—	Non-album singles
"Lozonjare" (featuring Altin Sulku)	2022	—	—	—	—	—	—	—	Non-album singles
"Florian Marku"	2022	—	—	—	—	—	—	—	Non-album singles
"Warning" (with BM and OTP)	2022	—	—	—	—	—	—	—	Non-album singles
"Bandita" (with Dardan)	2022	—	54	—	—	—	37	—	Non-album singles
"Alkool" (with Yll Limani)	2022	—	—	—	—	—	38	—	Non-album singles
"Heart Attack" (featuring Loredana)	2022	42	61	—	—	—	3	—	Non-album singles
"Edhe një natë" (featuring Xhensila Myrtezaj)	2022	—	—	—	—	—	—	—	Non-album singles
"Benz I Ri"	2022	—	—	—	—	—	—	—	Non-album singles
"Big Budz No Dust" (featuring Krept and Konan, Capo Plaza)	2022	—	—	—	—	—	—	—	Non-album singles
"Eagle" (with D-Block Europe)	2024	—	—	—	—	—	—	—	Rolling Stone
"Follow You"	2024	29	72	1	17	98	9	2	Non-album single
"—" denotes a recording that did not chart or was not released in that territory.

=== As featured artist ===
Title	Year	Peak chart positions					Certifications	Album
Title	Year	AUT	GER	GRE Int.	ITA	SWI	Certifications	Album
"Nummer 1" (Zuna featuring Azet and Noizy)	2017	42	7	—	—	25	BVMI: Platinum; IFPI SWI: Gold	Mele7
"Kriminell" (Azet featuring Zuna and Noizy)	2018	11	5	—	—	13	none	Fast Life
"Gango" (Snik featuring Noizy)	2018	—	—	1	—	—	none	Non-album single
"Colpo Grosso" (Snik featuring Capo Plaza, Gué Pequeno and Noizy)	2019	—	—	1	27	—	none	Topboy
"No Security" (Guè Pequeno featuring Noizy)	2020	—	—	—	56	—	none	Mr. Fini
"Murderer" (Arilena Ara featuring Noizy)	2021	—	—	—	—	—	none	Pop Art
"Mi Amor" (Dhurata Dora featuring Jugglerz and Noizy)	2021	—	—	—	—	19	none	Dhurata
"Bonjour Madame" (Mozzik featuring Noizy)	2021	—	—	—	—	14	none	Lamboziki
"Chiken Dinner" (Term & Rvchet featuring Dutchavelli and Noizy)	2022	—	—	—	—	—	none	Non-album singles
"Maradona" (Elai featuring Noizy)	2022	—	—	—	—	83	none	Non-album singles
"Aventura" (Ardian Bujupi featuring Noizy)	2022	—	—	—	—	43	none	Aventura
"—" denotes a recording that did not chart or was not released.
