= Alpha Show =

Albanian annual music festival

- Genre: Pop; Rap; Trap music; Hip-Hop
- Dates: (June / August annually)
- Venue: Mother Teresa Square, Air Albania Stadium, Andon Lapaj Stadium
- Locations: Tirana and Sarandë, Albania
- Country: Albania
- Years active: 2022–present
- Inaugurated: August 14, 2022
- Founder: Noizy
- Most recent: August 7, 2025
- Attendance: Estimated 25,000–35,000 per event
- Organizer: Noizy; 4-th edition Orange Festival; Orange Club Saranda
- Website: alphashow.al
- 4

Alpha Show is an annual outdoor music festival in Albania, established by Albanian rapper and entrepreneur Rigels Rajku, known professionally as Noizy. The event is typically held in large open-air venues such as public squares and stadiums, featuring performances by Albanian and international artists in the genres of pop, rap, trap, and hip-hop.

== History ==
The concept for the Alpha Show was introduced in early 2022, when Albanian rapper Noizy announced plans for a summer concert intended to bring together artists from both the Albanian and international music scenes. The first edition was held on 14 August 2022 and received coverage in Albanian media.

Later editions included additional stage and lighting elements, as well as international performers.

By 2023, the show adopted a festival format with additional visual and technical features, including 360-degree visuals and a larger venue.

The 2024 edition experienced some technical issues, including weather-related interruptions, but continued as scheduled.

In 2025, the Alpha Show scheduled its first edition outside Tirana, selecting Sarandë as the host city. The event has been included among other live music events held during Albania’s summer season. Since its inception, the Alpha Show has been held annually during the summer season in Albania.

== Editions ==
=== Alpha Show I (2022) ===
The first Alpha Show was held on 14 August 2022 at Mother Teresa Square in Tirana. Participating artists included: Noizy, DJ Bert, DJ Black, DJ GIMI-O, Finem & Solo, Kida, Ardian Bujupi, Xhensila Myrtezaj, Elgit Doda, Ledri Vula, Dhurata Dora, Ylli Limani, MC Kresha, Lyrical Son, Loredana, Bonez MC, Raf Camora, Dutchavelli, Lacrim, Gué, Ghali, Sfera Ebbasta, DJ Crax, Varrosi, Lil Koli, Duda, Elai, Dulla.

=== Alpha Show II (2023) ===
The second edition took place on 4 August 2023, again at Mother Teresa Square in Tirana. The lineup consisted of: Noizy, Rudi, Mr. Elvis, Stine, West Side Family, Stresi, Era Istrefi, Buta, Elvana Gjata, Elgit Doda, Ledri Vula, Dhurata Dora, Ylli Limani, MC Kresha, Lyrical Son, BM, Ryvanny, Ghali, Doda, Elai, Varrosi.

=== Alpha Show III (2024) ===
Alpha Show III was held on 27 June 2024 at the Air Albania Stadium in Tirana. Performers included: Noizy, Stefflon Don, Dafina, Tayna, Stresi, Era Istrefi, Lil Koli, Duda, Elgit Doda, Shadow, Ylli Limani, MC Kresha, Lyrical Son, Ryvanny, Duda, Elai, Varrosi.

=== Alpha Show IV (2025) ===
Alpha Show IV is scheduled for 7 August 2025 at the Andon Lapaj Stadium in Sarandë. It is organized by Noizy in collaboration with Orange Festival and Orange Club Saranda. Confirmed performers include: Claydee, Elai, Kida, Varrosi, Era Istrefi, Eleni Foureira, Noizy, DJ Bert. Additional artists may be announced.

== Broadcast ==
Some editions of Alpha Show have been broadcast by the Albanian national television station Top Channel as a media partner, either live or recorded.
