= Ardian Bujupi discography =

- Studio albums: 5
- EPs: 1
- Singles: 40

This article features the discography of Kosovar singer and songwriter Ardian Bujupi. His discography includes five studio albums, one extended play and numerous singles as a lead artist and featured artist. Bujupi has released five studio albums and thirty singles as a leading artist including four as a featured artist. In 2011, Bujupi premiered his first studio album To the Top which debuted at number 78 and 98 on the German and Swiss album charts respectively. In 2019, he released his fifth studio album Rahat which entered the album charts at number 32 in Germany, number 67 in Austria and 38 in Switzerland.

== Albums ==
=== Studio albums ===
Title	Album details	Peak chart positions		
Title	Album details	GER	AUT	SWI
To the Top	Released: 9 December 2011; Label: Firstlovemusic; Formats: CD, digital download, streaming	75	—	98
Ardicted	Released: 9 January 2015; Label: Trust No One Records; Formats: CD, digital download, streaming	40	70	24
Ardicted (Deluxe Edition)	Released: 9 January 2015; Label: Trust No One Records; Formats: CD, digital download, streaming	—	—	—
Melodia	Released: 9 June 2017; Label: N/A; Formats: CD, digital download, streaming	57	70	26
Arigato	Released: 27 April 2018; Label: Independent; Formats: CD, digital download, streaming	—	—	85
Rahat	Released: 5 September 2019; Label: Columbia; Formats: CD, digital download, streaming	32	67	38
10	Released: 28 May 2021; Label: Columbia; Formats: CD, digital download, streaming	96	—	31
Aventura	Released: Label: Formats: CD, digital download, streaming	—	—	—
"—" denotes a recording that did not chart or was not released in that territory.

=== Extended plays ===
Title	Album details	Peak chart positions		
Title	Album details	GER	AUT	SWI
Luna	Released: 6 December 2019; Label: Columbia; Formats: CD, digital download, streaming	—	—	—
"—" denotes a recording that did not chart or was not released in that territory.

== Singles ==
=== As lead artist ===
Title	Year	Peak chart positions				Album
Title	Year	ALB	GER	AUT	SWI	Album
"This Is My Time"	2011	—	40	69	44	To the Top
"Rise to the Top"	2011	—	—	—	—	To the Top
"I'm Feeling Good"	2012	—	—	—	—	Non-album singles
"Make You Mine"	2012	—	—	—	—	Non-album singles
"Penthouse" (featuring Dj Dalool)	2013	—	—	—	—	Non-album singles
"Want U Now" (featuring Tony T.)	2013	—	—	—	—	Non-album singles
"Boom Rakatak" (featuring DJ Mase, Big Ali and Lumidee)	2014	—	60	—	—	Ardicted
"All Night" (featuring LINDVR)	2014	—	—	—	—	Ardicted
"Feel" (featuring Genta Ismajli and Dj Dalool)	2014	—	—	—	—	Non-album single
"Nach den Sternen"	2014	—	—	—	—	Ardicted
"Wahnsinnig"	2014	—	—	—	—	Ardicted
"Scheine" (featuring Kurdo)	2015	—	—	—	—	Ardicted
"Joker"	2015	—	—	—	—	Ardicted
"Ewig"	2015	—	—	—	—	Ardicted
"Ardicted"	2016	—	—	—	—	Ardicted
"Na Jena Njo" (featuring Dj Dalool)	2016	—	—	—	—	Non-album single
"Kiss Kiss" (featuring Dj R'an, Mohombi and Big Ali)	2017	—	—	—	—	Melodia
"Intro"	2017	—	—	—	—	Melodia
"Keiner"	2017	—	—	—	—	Melodia
"Alleles"	2017	—	—	—		Melodia
"Andiamo" (featuring Capital T)	2017	1	—	—	—	Non-album singles
"Cika Cika" (featuring Xhensila Myrtezaj)	2018	—	90	—	40	Non-album singles
"Wie im Traum" (featuring Fero47)	2019	—	15	27	37	Rahat
"Wallah Ich Leb"	2019	—	77	—	—	Rahat
"Meine Liebe" (featuring Elvana Gjata)	2019	16	—	—	73	Rahat
"Eine Nacht"	2019	—	—	—	—	Non-album singles
"Luna"	2019	—	—	—	—	Non-album singles
"Ohne Warnung"	2020	—	49	—	35	Non-album singles
"Modela"	2020	—	49	—	35	Non-album singles
"Panorama" (with Xhensila Myrtezaj)	2020	4	—	—	35	Non-album singles
"Reggaeton" (with Mudi)	2020	—	—	—	—	Non-album singles
"Te dua" (with Mudi)	2020	—	—	—	79	Non-album singles
"Juliet"	2020	—	—	—	—	Non-album singles
"Jepi"	2020	—	—	—	—	Non-album singles
"Nur noch einmal"	2020	—	—	—	—	Non-album singles
"Nichts für Immer" (featuring NGEE)	2021	—	—	—	—	Non-album singles
"Ka je bonita"	2021	—	—	—	—	10
"Baila Morena"	2021	11	—	—	—	10
"Paname"	2021	—	—	—	—	10
"—" denotes a recording that did not chart or was not released in that territory.

=== As featured artist ===
Title	Year	Peak chart positions			Album
Title	Year	GER	AUT	SWI	Album
"Du bist anders" (Fard featuring Ardian Bujupi)	2018	73	—	—	Alter Ego
"—" denotes a recording that did not chart or was not released in that territory.
