= Mozzart (album) =

2020 studio album by Mozzik

Studio album by Mozzik
- Released: 30 July 2020
- Length: 61:00
- Language: Albanian, German
- Label: 2 Euro Gang; Urban
- Producer: Abaz; A-Boom; Kitza; Macloud; Miksu; Pllumb; Rzon; Xon Oxa; X-plosive

Mozzik chronology
Mozzart (2020)	Lamboziki (2022)

Singles from Mozzart
- 1. "Dhelpër dinake" Released: 8 November 2019; 2. "Zemra ime" Released: 13 December 2019; 3. "Auf wiedersehen" Released: 14 February 2020; 4. "Tom & Jerry" Released: 14 February 2020; 5. "Lass mal" Released: 7 May 2020; 6. "Madonna" Released: 26 June 2020; 7. "Baby" Released: 16 July 2020

Mozzart is the debut studio album by Kosovar rapper Mozzik. It was released for digital download and streaming on 30 July 2020 by 2 Euro Gang and Urban. The record premiered following Mozzik's widespread attention and chart success in German-speaking territories. For the record, the rapper collaborated with multiple producers, including Macloud, Miksu, Pllumb, Rzon, Xon Oxa, Kitza and X-plosive. Containing songs in Albanian and German, the album was aided by the release of seven singles, including "Dhelpër dinake", "Zemra ime", "Auf wiedersehen", "Tom & Jerry", "Lass mal", "Madonna" and "Baby". Most songs incorporate genres of hip hop and R&B. Upon release, Mozzart peaked at number 11 in Switzerland and reached number 75 in Austria.

== Background and composition ==
After signing contract with On Records, Mozzik rose to widespread attention in the Albanian-speaking Balkans. Since 2018, he has drawn recognition in German-speaking territories, following the releases of "Bonnie & Clyde" and "Romeo & Juliet" both in collaboration with Swiss rapper Loredana. Mozzart was released for digital download and streaming in various countries on 31 July 2020 by 2 Euro Gang and Urban, a subsidiary of Universal. Most of the songs on the album are in Albanian, with some songs performed by Mozzik in German. Some of the songs on the record incorporates genres of hip hop and R&B music. The rapper collaborated with multiple producers on the album, including Abaz, A-Boom, Kitza, Macloud, Miksu, Pllumb, Rzon, Xon Oxa and X-plosive.

In May 2020, Mozzik hinted at the release of the album during a poll on his Instagram account, where he encouraged his followers to vote for the album's title. On another occasion, the rapper uploaded the album's tracklist on the platform, with the song's titles being overpainted. He wrote underneath the post that as soon as it receives 100,000 comments, with the hashtag #2Euro, he would subsequently release the song's titles. In June 2020, after this was achieved, the rapper premiered the album's tracklist and announced its release date.

== Singles and reception ==
Seven singles preceded Mozzart in the span from November 2019 to July 2020. "Dhelpër dinake" was the first single released on 8 November 2019, where it reached number 16 in Switzerland. The record's second single, "Zemra ime", followed on 13 December 2019, and attained the top 15 in Albania as well as the top 100 in Switzerland. On 14 February 2020, "Auf wiedersehen" and "Tom & Jerry" were both distributed at once as the record's third and fourth singles. "Auf wiedersehen" experienced commercial success in German-speaking Europe, reaching number six in both Austria and Switzerland, and number 11 in Germany. Released on 7 May 2020, the record's fifth single, "Lass mal", failed to reach the same success, although it attained the top 40 in the aforementioned territories. The subsequent sixth and seventh singles, "Madonna" and "Baby", premiered on 26 June 2020 and 16 July 2020, respectively. "Madonna" topped the chart in Albania and peaked within the top 40 in Switzerland, while "Baby" entered the ranking in the latter country and in Germany, where it peaked at number 78.

== Reception ==
Kreizia Velija from Top Albania Radio expressed praise towards "Madonna" and saw "Hana" as the highlight song on the album. Telegrafi considered "Madonna" a success and predicted "Baby" to be another success. Multiple Albanian and German-language websites interpreted the lyrics of "Auf wiedersehen", "Dhelpër dinake" and "Lass mal" as a reproach against his failed relationships and marriage to Swiss rapper Loredana. In Austria, Mozzart entered the country's album chart in August 2020 at number 75, which remained its peak position. In Switzerland, the album debuted and peaked at number 11 in the same month, spending a total of two non-consecutive weeks on the chart.

== Track listing ==
Credits and tracklist adapted from Spotify.

Mozzart track listing
No.	Title	Writer(s)	Producer(s)	Length
1.	"Hana"	Mozzik; Macloud	Macloud	3:23
2.	"Glock"	Mozzik; Abaz; Miksu; X-plosive	Abaz; Miksu; X-plosive	2:47
3.	"Stari mahalles"	Mozzik; A-Boom	A-Boom	3:42
4.	"Dhelpër dinake"	Mozzik; Rzon	Rzon	3:06
5.	"Zemra ime"	Mozzik; Macloud; Rzon	Macloud; Rzon	3:08
6.	"Shqiptar" (featuring Unikkatil)	Mozzik; Unikatil; Macloud; Miksu	Macloud; Miksu	3:33
7.	"Boss"	Macloud; Rzon	Rzon	3:00
8.	"Louis Vuitton"	Mozzik; Kitza; Rzon; Xon Oxa	Kitza; Rzon; Xon Oxa	3:09
9.	"Sirena" (with Getinjo)	Mozzik; Getinjo; Pllumb; Rzon	Pllumb; Rzon	2:50
10.	"Madonna"	Mozzik; Rzon	Rzon	3:02
11.	"Auf wiedersehen"	Mozzik; Rzon	Rzon	3:16
12.	"Tom & Jerry"	Mozzik; Rzon	Rzon	1:38
13.	"Weiss"	Mozzik; Rzon	Rzon	3:05
14.	"Baby"	Mozzik; Rzon	Rzon	2:49
15.	"Nokia"	Mozzik; Rzon	Rzon	2:07
16.	"Lass mal"	Mozzik; Rzon	Rzon	3:15
17.	"Kaniher"	Mozzik; Pllumb; Rzon	Pllumb; Rzon	3:00
18.	"Kur trojshe"	Mozzik; Rzon	Rzon	3:31
19.	"Veqnjo"	Mozzik; Rzon	Rzon	3:58
20.	"Kërkun" (with Kida)	Mozzik; Kida; Rzon	Rzon	2:59
Total length:				61:00

== Charts ==
Chart performance for Mozzart
Chart (2020)	Peak position
Austrian Albums (Ö3 Austria)	75
Swiss Albums (Schweizer Hitparade)	11

== Release history ==
Release dates and formats for Mozzart
Region	Date	Format(s)	Label(s)	Ref.
Various	30 July 2020	Digital download; streaming	2 Euro Gang; Urban	
