= Tayna =

Kosovo-Albanian rapper and singer (born 1996)

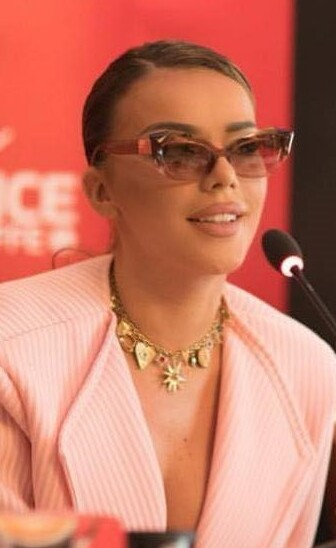
- Shala in 2022
- Born: Doruntina Shala; 14 December 1996 (age 29); Prizren, FR Yugoslavia (present-day Kosovo)
- Occupations: Rapper; singer
- Years active: 2018–present
- Musical career
- Genres: Hip hop; R&B; electronic
- Labels: Friends Entertainment; Sony

Doruntina Shala (Albanian: [dɔɾunˈtina ʃaˈla]; born 14 December 1996), known professionally as Tayna, is a Kosovo-Albanian rapper and singer. Born and raised in Prizren, she rose to prominence in the Albanian-speaking territories during the span of 2018 after the releases of five top-three singles.

== Life and career ==
=== 1996–2019: Early life and career beginnings ===
Doruntina Shala was born on 14 December 1996 in the city of Prizren, then part of the Federal Republic of Yugoslavia, present-day Kosovo. She and her family are part of the Shala tribe and they speak Albanian in the Gheg dialect. Shala auditioned for the first season of Talent X in 2016. She made her breakthrough in the Albanian-speaking territories, following the releases of "Columbiana" and "Shqipe" topping the charts in Albania. In August 2018, she performed at the Sunny Hill Festival in Prishtina along other acclaimed artists such as Action Bronson, Martin Garrix and Dua Lipa. In December 2018, she released her follow-up single "Aje" featuring fellow Kosovo-Albanian rapper Ledri Vula. In the same month, she was named as the personality of the year by the Kosovan television programme Privé.

In February 2019, Shala released the follow-up single titled "Ring Ring" and peaked at number eight in Albania. "Ring Ring" was succeeded by two top 10-singles, including "Kce" and "Caliente", the latter with Albanian producer Cricket. In August 2019, she collaborated with Albanian rappers Lyrical Son and MC Kresha on "Pasite". The single reached number one in Albania and peaked at number 155 on the Spotify charts in Switzerland. Nevertheless, the follow-up collaboration with fellow Kosovo-Albanian singer Dafina Zeqiri, "Bye Bye", also reached number one in her native country. "Sicko" and "Sorry", the subsequent releases, attained success in Albania, reaching number 2 and 13, respectively, on the local chart. In June 2019, Shala signed a two-year contract with the Kosovan coffee company Devolli Corporation.

=== 2020–present: Bipolar and continued success ===
In January 2020, Shala collaborated with Kosovo-Albanian rapper Mozzik on their single "Edhe ti", which was released to commercial success in Albanian and German-speaking territories. In July 2020, the rapper signed a record contract with the German subsidiary label of Sony Music. Succeeding "Bass", the single, "Qe Qe", peaked at number nine in Albania and went on to reach number 45 in Switzerland. In January 2021, she released her single titled "Moona" featuring French-Algerian rapper L'Algérino while peaking at number 83 in Switzerland. Another charting collaboration followed in June 2021 with the release of "Ti harro" with German-Albanian rapper Azet. In the same month, Shala was chosen as the protagonist on the summer collection titled Playboy x DEF of the German subsidiary of Playboy and German streetwear brand DefShop. In November 2021, she collaborated a second time with Ledri Vula on the follow-up single "Hala", which went on to peak at number 55 in Switzerland.

Her most viewed YouTube video is the 2021 single "Bye Bye" featuring Dafina Zeqiri, which has amassed over 84 million views.

Dedicated to Albanian women, "Heroinat" was released as the introduction single of Shala's upcoming debut studio album, Bipolar, on 28 November 2021 coinciding with the celebration of Albanian independence day. "OFG" was released as the record's second single in December 2021.

In June 2024, Tayna released her comeback single “Si Ai”. The song went viral on TikTok and other platforms catapulting the artist to new audiences. The song was taken off streaming platforms by her manager, after disputed break-up between them, however it was put up back again after some weeks after a disclosed agreement between the two. Her 2024 single "Si Ai" is Tayna's most streamed track to date, with over 67 million listens on Spotify alone. "Si Ai" charted internationally, peaking at number two in Greece and number four in Switzerland. It attained a platinum certification in Greece by IFPI Greece, becoming her first certification as a solo artist.

== Artistry ==
The music style of Shala has often been regarded as hip hop and R&B, although her music also includes various styles of musical genres such as reggaeton and dance. She is enthusiastic about literature and has frequently expressed her passion for reading and the books that have influenced her life. Blending genres such as rap-pop, alternative R&B, ethno-electronic, and afrobeats, the artist's style fuses urban energy with lyrical vulnerability, showcasing strengths in vocal presence, lyrical depth, artistic direction, visual storytelling, and spiritual melodies.

== Discography ==
=== Albums ===
- Bipolar (2023)
- Genesis (2026)

=== EP ===
- Tayna New Year Edition (2025)

=== Singles ===
==== As lead artist ====
===== 2010s =====
List of singles in the 2010s decade, with selected chart positions
Title	Year	Peak chart positions	Album
Title	Year	ALB	Album
"Columbiana" (featuring Don Phenom)	2018	1	Non-album single
"Shqipe"	2018	2	Non-album single
"Fake"	2018	3	Non-album single
"Doruntina"	2018	1	Non-album single
"Pow Pow"	2018	11	Non-album single
"Aje" (featuring Ledri Vula)	2018	2	Non-album single
"Ring Ring"	2019	8	Non-album single
"Kce"	2019	2	Non-album single
"Caliente" (with Cricket)	2019	4	Non-album single
"Pasite" (featuring Lyrical Son and MC Kresha)	2019	1	Non-album single
"Bye Bye" (featuring Dafina Zeqiri)	2019	1	Non-album single
"Sicko"	2019	2	Non-album single
"Sorry"	2019	13	Non-album single
"—" denotes a recording that did not chart or was not released in that territory.

===== 2020s =====
List of singles in the 2020s decade, with selected chart positions
Title	Year	Peak chart positions								Certifications	Album
Title	Year	ALB	AUT	GER	GRE Int.	ISR	KAZ Air.	SWI	TUR Int. Air.	Certifications	Album
"Edhe ti" (with Mozzik)	2020	2	—	90	—	*		26	—		Non-album singles
"A jo"	2020	—	—	—	—	*		—	—		Non-album singles
"Bass"	2020	12	—	—	—	*		—	—		Non-album singles
"Qe Qe"	2020	9	—	—	—	*		45	—		Non-album singles
"Johnny"	2020	—	—	—	—	*		—	—		Non-album singles
"Moona" (featuring L'Algérino)	2021	—	—	—	—	*		83	—		Non-album singles
"Magdalena" (with Flori Mumajesi and Cricket)	2021	—	—	—	—	*		—	—		Non-album singles
"WTF" (featuring Ivorian Doll)	2021	—	—	—	—	*		—	—		Non-album singles
"Ti harro" (with Azet)	2021	—	—	64	—	*		32	—		Non-album singles
"Taka"	2021	—	—	—	—	*		—	—		Non-album singles
"Hala" (featuring Ledri Vula)	2021	—	—	—	—	*		55	—		Non-album singles
"Heroinat"	2021	—	—	—	—	*		—	—		Bipolar
"OFG"	2021	—	—	—	—	*		—	—		Bipolar
"Pijetore" (with Cricket)	2022	—	—	—	—	*		—	—		Bipolar
"S'du me ni" (featuring Gesko)	2022	—	—	—	—	*		—	—		Bipolar
"Alpha & Omega" (with Marin)	2022	—	—	—	—	*		—	—		Bipolar
"Pare" (with Butrint Imeri and Mozzik)	2022	—	—	—	—	*		11	—		Bipolar
"Tequila" (featuring Azet)	2022	—	—	—	—	*		27	—		Bipolar
"Valle"	2022	—	—	—	—	*		—	—		Bipolar
"Teket"	2022	—	—	—	—	*		28	—		Bipolar
"Anaconda" (with Kidda)	2022	—	—	—	—	*		86	—		Non-album singles
"Merri"	2023	—	—	—	—	*	—	—	—		Non-album singles
"Mashallah" (with Buta)	2023	—	—	—	—	*	—	—	—		Non-album singles
"Kalle"	2023	—	—	—	—	*	—	—	—		Non-album singles
"Shqipe 2"	2023	—	—	—	—	*	—	—	—		Non-album singles
"Xhelozia"	2023	—	—	—	—	—	—	—	—		Non-album singles
"O jetë" (with Ardian Bujupi)	2023	—	—	—	—	—	—	56	—		Non-album singles
"Unaza" (with Bardhi)	2024	—	—	—	—	—	—	—	—		Non-album singles
"Si ai"	2024	—	28	35	2	65	68	4	4	IFPI GRE: Platinum	Non-album singles
"U bo kohë" (with Varrosi and Noizy)	2024	—	—	—	—	—	—	—	—		Non-album singles
"Hotel California" (with Light)	2024	—	—	—	2	—	—	—	—		Non-album singles
"Na 2" (with Loredana)	2024										Non-album singles
"Obsession"	2024										Non-album singles
"Amal"	2025										Non-album singles
"Thana"	2025										Non-album singles
"Lot" (with Butrint Imeri)	2025										Non-album singles
"Kitara" (with Yll Limani)	2025										Non-album singles
"Ujë"	2025										Non-album singles
"Tint" (with MC Kresha and Lyrical Son)	2025										Non-album singles
"Late night" (with Summer Cem, Geenaro and Ghana beats)	2025										Non-album singles
"Diamond"	2025										Non-album singles
"Muza"	2026										Genesis
"Vena"	2026	—	—	—	—	—	—	86	—		Genesis
"Della"	2026										Genesis
"Calma" (with Dardan and Azet)	2026										EUROSPORT; 2
"—" denotes a recording that did not chart or was not released in that territory. "*" denotes that the chart did not exist at that time.

==== As featured artist ====
List of singles as featured artist
Title	Year	Album
"La Boca" (L'Algérino featuring Tayna)	2021	Non-album single
"Piece of Me" (Regard featuring Tayna)	2025	Non-album single
