= Lamboziki =

2022 studio album by Mozzik

Studio album by Mozzik
- Released: 13 February 2022
- Genre: Hip hop; pop; R&B
- Length: 43:35
- Language: Albanian; English; French; German
- Label: 2 Euro Gang; Urban
- Producer: Pellumb; Rzon; Rvchet

Mozzik chronology
Mozzart (2020)	Lamboziki (2022)

Singles from Lamboziki
- 1. "Bonjour Madame" Released: 21 October 2021; 2. "Shko" Released: 24 November 2021; 3. "Ska" Released: 27 January 2022

Lamboziki is the second studio album recorded by Kosovar rapper Mozzik. It was released for digital download and streaming on 13 February 2022 by 2 Euro Gang and Urban as a follow-up to Mozzart (2020). Lasting for 43 minutes and 35 seconds across 14 songs, the rapper extensively collaborated with Kosovo-Albanian producers Pellumb and Rzon on the record. It was classified as a hip hop, pop and R&B album, comprising songs performed mainly in Albanian with limited lines in English, French, and German. Upon release, Lamboziki saw a moderate commercial success, reaching number 42 in Switzerland. Three singles released throughout October 2021 to January 2022 preceded the record, including "Bonjour Madame" featuring Noizy, "Shko" and "Ska" with Elvana Gjata. The former three were all accompanied by music videos and entered the single charts in Albania and Switzerland.

== Background and composition ==
Preceded by a teaser in October 2021, Mozzik announced Lamboziki as his second studio album on his social media accounts and revealed the record's title and cover art. The latter depicts a golden portrait of the rapper positioned in a black coat of arms, resembling the logo of Italian manufacturer Lamborghini, with lettering displayed in gold above the coat. The tracklist and release date as 13 February 2022 were unveiled through the rapper's social media on another occasion in early February. The record was ultimately issued in various countries on the announced date by 2 Euro Gang and Urban, a subsidiary of Universal. Lamboziki contains 14 songs and lasts for 43 minutes and 35 seconds. For the record, Mozzik collaborated with Kosovo-Albanian producers Pellumb and Rzon, while also being involved in the writing process of all the songs. Critical commentary noted the record to incorporate hip hop, pop and R&B music, with funk, rock, urban elements. The record's songs are predominantly performed in Albanian, with several songs encompassing German, English and French lyrics, as well.

== Promotion ==
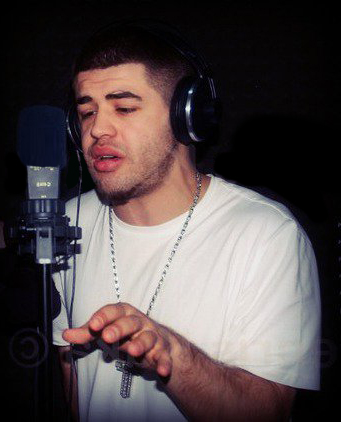
Noizy is featured on "Bonjour Madame", the first song on Lamboziki.

Lamboziki was supported by three singles, including its accompanying music videos, which premiered from October 2021 to January 2022. "Bonjour Madame" was released as the record's first single on 21 October and featured the Albanian rapper Noizy. Described as a hip hop, R&B and urban song, it lyrically focuses on pleasure and passion, and is concentrated on a desire to attract the attention of an independent woman. Commercially, the recording reached number 14 on Switzerland's Top 100 chart in late October. The record's second single, "Shko", followed on 24 November, and entered the top five on Albania's Top 100 chart in early December. Musically a pop song with funk and rock components, its video game-inspired music video was well received by reviewers, who lauded Mozzik's appearance, and noted the retro and science-fiction visuals. This was followed on 27 January 2022 by the premiere of the record's third single "Ska", an urban and R&B recording delving into the concepts of empowerment and self-love. Collaborating with Albanian singer and songwriter Elvana Gjata, it reached number three in Albania and peaked at number 33 in Switzerland. To further promote the record's premiere, a single music video for "Patrolla" and "Kriminela" was released during the record's release.

Upon release, Lamboziki experienced a moderate commercial success in Switzerland, debuting and peaking at number 42 on the Swiss albums charts. Four other songs from the record, including "A po rrin", "Kriminela", "Patrolla" and "Ye Ye", debuted within the top 100 in Albania for the week ending 19 February 2022.

== Track listing ==
Credits and tracklist adapted from Spotify.

Lamboziki track listing
No.	Title	Writer(s)	Producer(s)	Length
1.	"Bonjour Madame" (featuring Noizy)	Mozzik; Noizy; Pellumb; Rzon; Rvchet	Rzon; Rvchet	3:23
2.	"Shko"	Mozzik; Pellumb; Rzon	Pellumb; Rzon	2:56
3.	"Ska" (with Elvana Gjata)	Mozzik; Pellumb; Rzon	Pellumb; Rzon	2:48
4.	"Hotel"	Mozzik; Pellumb; Rzon	Pellumb; Rzon	3:14
5.	"Milioner"	Mozzik; Pellumb; Rzon	Pellumb; Rzon	3:04
6.	"Sytë mu kan tha"	Mozzik; Pellumb; Rzon	Pellumb; Rzon	3:44
7.	"Telefonata"	Mozzik; Pellumb; Rzon	Pellumb; Rzon	3:00
8.	"Ye Ye"	Mozzik; Pellumb; Rzon	Pellumb; Rzon	3:19
9.	"Splifin mos e nal"	Mozzik; Pellumb; Rzon	Pellumb; Rzon	3:12
10.	"Broski" (featuring Getinjo)	Mozzik; Pellumb; Rzon	Pellumb; Rzon	2:34
11.	"Huligan"	Mozzik; Pellumb; Rzon	Pellumb; Rzon	2:41
12.	"Patrolla"	Mozzik; Pellumb; Rzon	Pellumb; Rzon	3:07
13.	"A po rrin"	Mozzik; Pellumb; Rzon	Pellumb; Rzon	4:19
14.	"Kriminela"	Mozzik; Pellumb; Rzon	Pellumb; Rzon	2:11
Total length:				43:35

== Credits and personnel ==
Credits adapted from Spotify and Tidal.

- Mozzik – songwriting, vocals
- Darko Dimitrov – mastering, mixing
- Elvana Gjata – featured vocals
- Getinjo – featured vocals
- Noizy – featured vocals, songwriting
- Pellumb – producing, songwriting
- Rzon – producing, songwriting
- Rvchet – producing, songwriting

== Charts ==
Chart performance for Lamboziki
Chart (2022)	Peak position
Swiss Albums (Schweizer Hitparade)	42

== Release history ==
Release dates and formats for Lamboziki
Region	Date	Format(s)	Label(s)	Ref.
Various	13 February 2022	Digital download; streaming	2 Euro Gang; Urban	
