= Cricket (producer) =

Kosovar record producer

- Born: Donat Prelvukaj; 8 April 2000 (age 26)
- Occupations: Record producer, arranger
- Years active: 2017–present
- Musical career
- Label: Friends Entertainment

Donat Prelvukaj (Albanian: [dɔ'nat pɾɛl'vukaj]), known professionally as Cricket, is a Kosovar record producer.

== Discography ==
=== Extended plays ===
- Nostalgji (2020)

=== Singles ===
==== As lead artist ====
List of singles as lead artist, with selected chart positions
Title	Year	Peak chart positions
Title	Year	ALB
"Hush" (featuring Argjentina Ramosaj)	2017	18
"Autumn Leaves" (with Yll Limani)	2018	48
"Friday Night" (with Yll Limani)	2018	—
"Kthema kohën (Remix)" (with Numen)	2019	15
"Caliente" (with Tayna)	2019	4
"Me fal (Remix)" (with Numen)	2019	—
"Mesazhi (Remix)" (with Numen)	2019	18
"Një herë në jetë" (featuring Dafina Zeqiri)	2020	5
"Ndoshta" (featuring Yll Limani)	2021	1st
"Pray" (featuring Yll Limani)	2021	30
"Magdalena" (with Tayna and Flori Mumajesi)	2021	—
"Bompa" (featuring Kaona)	2021	52
"Pa ty" (featuring Muma)	2021	19
"Pa ty (Remix)" (featuring Muma and Dafina Zeqiri)	2021	1st
"Thema" (featuring Muma)	2021	45
"Pijetore" (with Tayna)	2021	—
"Dikur" (featuring Diona Fona)	2022	—
"—" denotes a recording that did not chart or was not released in that territory.

=== Production credits ===
List of singles as producer
Song	Year	Artist	Album	Ref.
"BonBon"	2015	Era Istrefi	Non-album single	
"Edhe ti"	2020	Tayna and Mozzik	Non-album single	
"Dashni"	2022	Dafina Zeqiri	Non-album single	
