= Mos shko =

2020 single by Dafina Zeqiri featuring Yll Limani

Single by Dafina Zeqiri featuring Yll Limani
- Language: Albanian
- Released: 27 December 2020
- Genre: Electro-pop; R&B
- Length: 3:27
- Label: Bzzz; Moneyz
- Songwriters: Dafina Zeqiri; Elinel
- Producer: Rzon

Dafina Zeqiri featuring Yll Limani singles chronology
"Zili Zili" (2020)	"Mos shko" (2020)	"Duro" (2021)

Yll Limani singles chronology
"Buzët e kuqe" (2020)	"Mos shko" (2020)	"Ndoshta" (2021)

Music video
- "Mos shko" on YouTube

"Mos shko" (Albanian pronunciation: [mɔs ʃkɔ]; transl. Don't go) is a song by Kosovar singer and songwriter Dafina Zeqiri featuring Kosovar singer Yll Limani released as a single on 27 December 2020 by Bzzz Entertainment and Moneyz. "Mos shko" was written by Zeqiri and Albanian singer and songwriter Elinel, and produced by Albanian producer Rzon. An official music video was uploaded simultaneously with the single's release onto YouTube also being awarded the "Best Image In The Clip" at the 2021 Netët e Klipit Shqiptar gala.

== Background and composition ==
"Mos shko" was written by Albanian singer and songwriter Elinel alongside Zeqiri, who was also credited for the composition. Albanian producer Rzon handled the producing process of "Mos shko". In early December 2020, Zeqiri published a photo on her social media in which she teased her upcoming single featuring Kosovo-Albanian singer and songwriter Yll Limani by briefly elaborating on its creation in the studio; written in the photo, Zeqiri announced that the single would have the name "Mos shko". Musically, it is an Albanian language r&b-inspired electro-pop song, featuring both singers singing in a "passionate" tone. It lyrically discusses an unresolved relationship where two lovers are finding it hard to go their separate ways.

== Music video ==
Prior to the release, Zeqiri and Limani teased the accompanying music video for "Mos shko" with a preview posted to their respective Instagram accounts. The video was ultimately premiered simultaneously with the single's release to the official YouTube channel of Dafina Zeqiri on 27 December 2020 at 18:00 (CET) on YouTube. Additionally, it was awarded with the "Best Image In The Clip" at the 2021 Netët e Klipit Shqiptar gala in Ulcinj, Montenegro.

== Personnel and credits ==
Credits adapted from Tidal and YouTube.

- Dafina Zeqiri – composing, songwriting, vocals
- Yll Limani – vocals
- Andi Gola – video directing
- Elinel – composing, songwriting
- Rzon – producing
- Wonder – video production
- Yllka Mustafa – video directing

== Track listing ==
- Digital download
1. "Mos shko" – 3:27

== Release history ==
Release dates and formats for "Mos shko"
Region	Date	Format(s)	Label(s)	Ref.
Various	27 December 2020	Digital download; streaming	Bzzz; Moneyz	
