= Diona Fona =

Kosovar singer (born 1999)

- Born: 9 February 1999 (age 27); London, England
- Years active: 2015–present
- Musical career
- Genre: pop
- Occupation: singer
- Instruments: vocals

Diona Fona (born 9 February 1999) is a Kosovar singer. She began her career in 2017 with her debut single Havera.

== Early life and education ==
Born and raised in London to Albanian parents from Kosovo, Diona developed an early interest in the performing arts, attending drama, singing and dance classes. In addition to music, she has expressed a passion for the game of football, which she plays recreationally.

== Career ==
Fona first came to the public's attention in 2015 by posting cover performances of popular songs online, receiving positive feedback. She made her official music debut in 2017 with the single Havera, produced by Redbox Entertainment, which achieved significant success and helped establish her as an emerging artist. Following this breakthrough, she released additional singles including “Shootah”, “Shy” and “Ikim”.

Her music has frequently appeared on the Albanian music chart The Top List. Among her best-known hits are “Ti Je” (a collaboration with EAZ, which topped the chart for several consecutive weeks), “Bella Vita”, “Baje”, “Falma”, “S’ka mo lot”, “Sa gjynah” and “Tattoo”. Many of her releases have been noted for their rhythmic style, romantic themes and contemporary pop sound, while songs like “Dimër”, in collaboration with Art, showcase a softer and more melodic tone.

== Personal life ==
On August 29, 2021, she was featured as one of the faces of Fenty Beauty, the cosmetics line founded by the Barbadian superstar Rihanna, appearing as part of the brand’s official imagery on its website and social media platforms.

== Discography ==
=== Singles ===
Year	Song
2017	"Havera"
2017	"Shootah"
2017	"Shy"
2018	"Ikim"
2018	"Veç fjalë"
2018	"Feeling"
2019	"E ke dit"
2019	"Bella Vita"
2019	"Katalea"
2019	"Ti je" (feat. EAZ)
2020	"Baje"
2020	"Xhani"
2021	"Sheqer"
2021	"Fire" (feat. ZieZie)
2021	"Pistole" (feat. Marin)
2021	"A jena"
2022	"Dikur" (feat. Cricket)
2022	"Mama"
2022	"Zari"
2022	"Amante" (feat. Romeo)
2023	"Dimër" (feat. Art)
2023	"Po Pi" (feat. Majk)
2023	"Bounce" (feat. Lumi B)
2023	"Falma"
2024	"S'ka mo lot"
2024	"Sa gjynah"
2024	"Tattoo"
2025	"My way" (feat. Marin)
2025	"Paso" (feat. MC Kresha)
2025	"Lotta Dem" (feat. Adion)
2025	"Merri tonat"
