= Heart Attack (Noizy song) =

2022 single by Noizy featuring Loredana

Single by Noizy featuring Loredana
- Language: Albanian, English
- Released: 17 June 2022
- Genre: Hip hop
- Length: 2:37
- Label: OTR; Ventura
- Songwriters: Noizy; Loredana
- Producer: Engli Versal

Noizy singles chronology
"Alkool" (2022)	"Heart Attack" (2022)	"Edhe një natë" (2022)

Loredana singles chronology
"Ballade" (2022)	"Heart Attack" (2022)	"Let's go" (2022)

Music video
- "Heart Attack" on YouTube

"Heart Attack" is a song by Albanian singer Noizy featuring Kosovar rapper Loredana. It was written by the artist themselves and produced by Engli Versal. The song was released as a single for digital download and streaming on 17 June 2022 by OTR and Ventura Records. It is an Albanian and English-language hip hop song with dancehall, reggaeton and Albanian rap elements. The lyrics explore a flirtatious tale about a person who wishes to have his significant other every morning and night.

"Heart Attack" received acclaim from music critics upon release, several of whom praised the music, lyrics as well as Noizy and Loredana's vocal delivery. Commercially, the song reached the top three in Switzerland, while peaking at number 42 in Austria and number 61 in Germany. An accompanying music video was uploaded to Noizy's YouTube channel on 17 June 2022, depicting both rappers performing in several settings in Albania.

== Background and composition ==
"Heart Attack" was released as a single for digital download and streaming in various territories on 17 June 2022 by OTR and Ventura Records. Prior to the release in early June 2022, Noizy and Loredana were spotted filming a music video in Durrës, Albania, approximately two weeks before the official confirmation of their collaboration. Noizy and Loredana wrote the song, while Engli Versal produced it. Musically, "Heart Attack" is an Albanian and English-language hip hop song with dancehall, reggaeton and Albanian rap elements backed by a rhythmic instrumentation. It lyrically delves into a flirtatious tale about a person who wishes to have his significant other all to himself on every morning and night. Part of Loredana's lyrics incorporates a lyric sample from Jamaican artist Beenie Man's "Who Am I (Sim Simma)" (1998), including "Sim Simma, who got the keys to my Bimma?".

== Reception ==
Upon release, "Heart Attack" was met with positive reviews from music critics. Writing for songtexte.de, Katrin highlighted the song's "summer vibes" and opined that "[the song] itself is perfect for the summer and long nights in a club". While Alina Amin of hiphop.de deemed the song an "international sound", the staff of laut.de praised the "heated atmosphere" and further stated that "the driving instrumental [...] animates [Noizy] to excessive self-confidence, with Loredana managing to slow him down". On a similar note, Zangba Thomson from Bong Mines Entertainment commended the "braggadocios lyrics" and "ear-pleasing" Albanian and English vocals. Commercially, "Heart Attack" entered the charts in German-speaking Europe, reaching number three in Switzerland, number 42 in Austria and number 61 in Germany. The song further peaked atop the Billboard Switzerland Songs chart and reached the top 20 on the last issue of Austria Songs ranking on the week ending 2 July 2022.

== Promotion ==
The music video was filmed in Durrës, Albania, and depicts Noizy and Loredana in several settings.

An accompanying music video for "Heart Attack" was uploaded to Noizy's official YouTube channel on 17 June 2022. The Latin American-described video contains scenes filmed in the city of Durrës and along the Albanian coast. The video opens with Noizy sitting on a chair, accompanied by several male people, in front of a residence. Along with several background dancers, Loredana is shown during her parts on a beach setting and next to a gas station. Further interspersed shots show both Noizy and Loredana performing to the song on a truck as well as in a neon setting. To further promote the song, the rappers performed "Heart Attack" live at the Alpha Show in Tirana, Albania, on 14 August 2022.

== Track listing ==
- Digital download and streaming
1. "Heart Attack" – 2:37

== Charts ==
Chart performance for "Heart Attack"
Chart (2022)	Peak position
Austria (Ö3 Austria Top 40)	42
Germany (GfK)	61
Switzerland (Schweizer Hitparade)	3

== Release history ==
Release dates and formats for "Heart Attack"
Region	Date	Format(s)	Label(s)	Ref.
Various	17 June 2022	Digital download; streaming	OTR; Ventura	
