= Elai (rapper) =

Kosovar rapper (born 1999)

Elai Lirim Ibishi
- Born: 14 January 1999 (age 27); Mitrovica, Kosovo
- Genres: Hip hop
- Occupations: Rapper, producer, songwriter
- Years active: 2019 – present
- Label: OTR

Lirim Ibishi, (born 14 January 1999), known professionally as Elai, is a Kosovan-Swedish rapper, producer and songwriter from Mölndal, Gothenburg.

== Life and career ==
=== 1999–present: Early life and career beginnings ===
Elai was born on 04 March 1999 into an Albanian family from Mitrovica. His singles, "Paranormal" and "Lale", occurred within the Albanian Top 100 in October 2021 and reached the top 10, respectively, although "Lale" continued its success abroad and peaked at number 88 in Switzerland. In the same year, Elai contributed credited songwriting to Albanian rapper Noizy's "Një herë e mirë". As of September 2021, his upcoming debut studio album was under development. Released in June 2021, "Nokia" peaked at number 32 on the native Top 100 after entering the chart in early November 2021. Elai was nominated for Producer of the Year at the 2022 Grammis in Sweden.

== Discography ==
=== Extended plays ===
- Ensam (2020)

=== Singles ===
==== As lead artist ====
List of singles as lead artist, with selected chart positions
Title	Year	Peak chart positions				Album
Title	Year	ALB	AUT	GRE	SWI	Album
"Money"	2019	—	—	—	—	Non-album single
"Bon"	2019	—	—	—	—	Non-album single
"Kom"	2019	—	—	—	—	Non-album single
"Babe"	2019	—	—	—	—	Non-album single
"Tata"	2019	—	—	—	—	Non-album single
"Latina"	2019	—	—	—	—	Non-album single
"2"	2020	—	—	—	—	Non-album single
"Hör av sig nu"	2020	—	—	—	—	Non-album single
"Världen"	2020	—	—	—	—	Non-album single
"Donna"	2020	—	—	—	—	Non-album single
"Zlatan"	2020	—	—	—	—	Non-album single
"Babo"	2020	—	—	—	—	Non-album single
"Latina Pt. 2"	2021	—	—	—	—	Non-album single
"Kuku"	2021	—	—	—	—	Non-album single
"Nokia"	2021	32	—	—	—	Non-album single
"Paranormal"	2021	7	—	—	—	Non-album single
"Lale"	2021	4	—	—	88	Non-album single
"Pise"	2021	52	—	—	—	Non-album single
"Maradona" (featuring Noizy)	2022	—	—	—	83	Non-album single
"Lovely"	2022	49	—	—	—	Non-album single
"Balenciaga"	2022	—	—	—	—	Non-album single
"Ca doni?"	2022	—	—	—		Non-album single
"Truni terr"	2022	40	—	—	—	Non-album single
"Teta"	2023	—	—	—	—	Non-album single
"Un me ty"	2023	—	—	—	17	Non-album single
"Joti"	2023	34	—	52	22	Non-album single
"Krenari"	2023	—	—	—	—	Non-album single
"2003"	2023	—	—	—	38	Non-album single
"California"	2023	—	—	—	72	Non-album single
"Ika"	2023	—	—	—	92	Non-album single
"Tiki Taka" (with Ashafar and RAF Camora)	2023	—	56	—	91	Non-album single
"Benzema"	2023	—	—	—	—	Non-album single
"Mërzia" (with Elgit Doda)	2023	—	—	—	—	Non-album single
"Ghetto"	2024	—	—	—	63	Non-album single
"TN"	2024	—	—	—	—	Non-album single
"Pa To"	2024	—	—	—	—	Non-album single
"—" denotes a recording that did not chart or was not released in that territory.						Non-album single

==== As featured artist ====
List of singles as featured artist, with selected chart positions
Title	Year	Peak chart positions		Album
Title	Year	FRA	SWI	Album
"Chocolata" (Jul featuring Elai)	2022	21	94	Cœur blanc
"Europa" (Jul featuring Rhove, Morad and Elai)	2022	61	—	Cœur blanc
"Amigo" (Baby Gang and Elai)	2023	—	—	Innocente
"Balerina" (MC Kresha and Lyrical Son featuring Elai)	2025	—	—	Salihi x Ferizi
"—" denotes a recording that did not chart or was not released in that territory.

=== Songwriter credits ===
List of songs credited as a songwriter
Song	Year	Artist	Album	Ref.
"Një herë e mirë"	2021	Noizy	Non-album single	

== Awards and nominations ==
List of awards and nominations
Year	Award	Nomination	Work	Result	Ref.
2022	Grammis	Producer of the Year	Himself	Nominated	
