= Meine Liebe (song) =

2019 single by Ardian Bujupi featuring Elvana Gjata

Single by Ardian Bujupi featuring Elvana Gjata

from the album Rahat
- Released: 1 August 2019
- Length: 3:05
- Label: Columbia; Sony
- Songwriters: Ardian Bujupi; Dominik Lange; Elvana Gjata; UNIK
- Producer: UNIK

Ardian Bujupi singles chronology
"Cika Cika (Remix)" (2019)	"Meine Liebe" (2019)	"Casino" (2019)

Elvana Gjata singles chronology
"Fustani" (2019)	"Meine Liebe" (2019)	"A M'don" (2019)

Music video
- "Meine Liebe" on YouTube

"Meine Liebe" (German pronunciation: [maɪnə liːbə]; transl. My love) is a song by German-Kosovar singer Ardian Bujupi featuring Albanian singer and songwriter Elvana Gjata. A German and Albanian language pop song, the lyrics features the theme of love and missing somebody. The official music video for the song was shot in Germany and was uploaded on 1 August 2019 onto YouTube in order to accompany the single's release.

== Background and composition ==
Running for a duration of three minutes and five seconds, "Meine Liebe" was written by both Ardian Bujupi and Elvana Gjata alongside German producer Dominik Lange. The production for the song was handled by German-Greek producer Nikolaos Giannulidis, who is professionally known as UNIK. The song was composed in 4/4 time and is performed in the key of F♭ major in common time with a tempo of 96 beats per minute. It features lyrics in both, the German and Albanian languages. It was made available digitally as a single through Columbia Germany and Sony Music Germany.

== Music video ==
The accompanying music video for "Meine Liebe" was officially premiered onto the YouTube channel of Ardian Bujupi on 1 August 2019, and further on Apple Music one day after, on 2 August 2019. It was directed by Hasan Kuyucu while Lily Hopkins Raeder acted as the video producer. Maya Lu and Jodi Gardner were additionally hired for styling, make-up and hair styling, respectively. The colorful music video was filmed in the capital city of Berlin, Germany.

== Personnel ==
Credits adapted from Tidal.

- Ardian Bujupi – songwriting, vocals
- Elvana Gjata – songwriting, vocals
- Dominik Lange – songwriting
- Lex Barkey – mastering
- UNIK – engineering, mixing, producing

== Charts ==
Chart (2019)	Peak position
Albania (The Top List)	16
Switzerland (Schweizer Hitparade)	73
Switzerland (Spotify Charts)	60
