= Rosenkrieg =

2021 single by Loredana and Mozzik

Single by Loredana and Mozzik

from the album No Rich Parents
- Language: Albanian, German
- English title: "War of roses"
- Released: 28 May 2021
- Length: 2:26
- Label: Independent
- Songwriters: Loredana; Mozzik; Saru; Selmon; Takt; Vito
- Producers: Jumpa; Loredana; Mozzik

Loredana singles chronology
| "Kein Hunger" (2020) | "Rosenkrieg" (2021) | "Oh Digga" (2021) |

Mozzik singles chronology
| "N'Tiranë" (2021) | "Rosenkrieg" (2021) | "Oh Digga" (2021) |

Music video
- "Rosenkrieg" on YouTube

"Rosenkrieg" (German: [ˈʁoːzn̩kʁiːk]; transl. "War of roses") is a song by Kosovar rapper Loredana and Kosovar rapper Mozzik from their collaborative studio album No Rich Parents (2021). The song was written by Loredana, Mozzik, Saru, Selmon, Smajl Shaqiri, Takt and Vito, and produced by Loredana, Mozzik and Jumpa. It was independently released as the lead single for digital download and streaming on 28 May 2021. The lyrics of the Albanian and German-language song attempt to elaborate their separation and seek to find answers to the questions of why it had come so far. "Rosenkrieg" was well received by music critics, some of whom praised its music and lyrics. The single was a commercial success in German-speaking Europe, reaching number one in Germany, as well as the top five in Austria and Switzerland. The accompanying music video was directed by Fati.tv and Haris Dubica, being released along with the song. It features scenes during Loredana and Mozzik's time together as a couple and re-enacted shots from their separation and reunion.

== Background and composition ==
In 2019, Loredana and Mozzik announced their separation, approximately a year after the birth of their daughter Hana. Prior to the release of "Rosenkrieg" in May 2021, a social media post by Loredana featuring her with a newborn child in her arms sparked rumors that the couple had reunited and married for a second time. The latter themes were addressed during the song's Albanian and German-language lyrics, wherein, both attempt to elaborate their separation and seek to find answers to the questions of why it had come so far. "Rosenkrieg" was written by Loredana, Mozzik, Saru, Selmon, Smajl Shaqiri, Takt and Vito, while the production was handled by Jumpa, Loredana and Mozzik. The song was independently released for digital download and streaming on 28 May 2021 as the lead single from their collaborative studio album No Rich Parents (2021).

== Reception and promotion ==
"Rosenkrieg" was met with generally positive reviews from music critics. Swiss website Lyrics Magazin found the song "perfectly" backed by a "theatrical beat", which with the use of a vocal sample and an acoustic guitar, brought out the emotions even more. Mira Weingart from Red Bull described it as "emotional" and very "personal". "Rosenkrieg" attained commercial success in German-speaking Europe. The single topped the Official German Charts in June 2021, and also reached the top five in Austria and Switzerland, respectively.

An accompanying music video for "Rosenkrieg" was uploaded to Mozzik's official YouTube channel simultaneously with the single's release on 28 May 2021. The video was directed by Fati.tv and Haris Dubica and produced by Luka Katic and Nancho by Fati.tv. It features scenes of Loredana and Mozzik during their time together as a couple, including reenacted shots from their separation and reunion as well as the birth of their daughter. During Loredana's Red Bull Symphonic concert in November 2021, the single was presented in an orchestral version, which was labelled by Martin Seebacher, as a "banger".

== Credits and personnel ==
Credits adapted from Spotify and Tidal.

- Loredana – producing, songwriting, vocals
- Mozzik (Gramoz Aliu) – producing, songwriting, vocals
- Jumpa – songwriting, producing
- Saru – songwriting
- Selmon – songwriting
- Smajl Shaqiri – songwriting
- Takt – songwriting
- Vito – songwriting
- Koen Heldens – mixing, mastering

== Charts ==
Chart performance for "Rosenkrieg"
| Chart (2021) | Peak position |
|---|---|
| Austria (Ö3 Austria Top 40) | 5 |
| Germany (GfK) | 1 |
| Global 200 (Billboard) | 146 |
| Switzerland (Schweizer Hitparade) | 2 |

== See also ==
- List of number-one hits of 2021 (Germany)
