= Oh Digga =

2021 single by Loredana and Mozzik

Single by Loredana and Mozzik

from the album No Rich Parents
- Language: Albanian; German
- Released: 25 June 2021
- Genre: Hip hop
- Length: 2:26
- Label: Independent
- Songwriters: Loredana; Mozzik; Alexander Wagner; Jumpa; Smajl Shaqiri
- Producers: Loredana; Mozzik; Jumpa

Loredana singles chronology
"Rosenkrieg" (2021)	"Oh Digga" (2021)	"Nëse Don" (2021)

Mozzik singles chronology
"Rosenkrieg" (2021)	"Oh Digga" (2021)	"Dashni me Photoshop" (2021)

Music video
- "Oh Digga" on YouTube

"Oh Digga" is a song by Kosovar rapper Loredana and Kosovar rapper Mozzik from their first collaborative studio album, No Rich Parents (2021). It was independently released as the record's second single for digital download and streaming on 25 June 2021. It was written by Loredana, Mozzik, Alexander Wagner, Jumpa and Smajl Shaqiri, with the production by Loredana, Mozzik and Jumpa. "Oh Digga" is a German-language hip hop song, which lyrically talks about the rapper's being tired by envious and toxic people. Music critics particularly praised the song's nature. An accompanying music video was uploaded to Loredana's YouTube channel on 25 June 2021. It depicts Loredana and Mozzik with several imitations of themselves throughout the clip. Commercially, "Oh Digga" reached the top 10 in Albania and peaking at number 44 in Austria, as well as number 27 in Germany and Switzerland, respectively.

== Background and composition ==
Loredana and Mozzik confirmed their first collaborative studio album, No Rich Parents, in May 2021. "Oh Digga" was independently released as the record's second single under exclusive license to Groove Attack in various countries on 25 June 2021. It was written by Loredana, Mozzik, Alexander Wagner, Jumpa and Smajl Shaqiri, with the production by Loredana, Mozzik and Jumpa. It is a German-language hip hop song, which talks about the rapper's being tired by envious and toxic people.

== Reception and music video ==
Upon its release, "Oh Digga" received positive reviews from music critics. Lea Hohneck from rap.de predicted a success in part to the track's "expressive" beat, its "punchlines" and "side cuts". Raphael from VN Hip Hop was similarly positive and wrote that it is a "addictive jam". "Oh Digga" experienced commercial success in Albania and German-speaking Europe. It peaked at number six in Albania and reached number 44 in Austria, as well as number 27 in Germany and Switzerland, respectively. An accompanying music video for "Oh Digga" was uploaded to Loredana's official YouTube channel simultaneously with the single's release on 25 June 2021. It was directed and produced by Fati.Tv and Haris Dubica, while Dieser Bobby acted as the creative director. In the clip, the rappers are predominantly seen with several imitations of themselves, trying to represent the rapper's originality.

== Track listing ==
- Digital download and streaming
1. "Oh Digga" – 2:26

== Credits and personnel ==
Credits adapted from Spotify and Tidal.

- Loredana – producing, songwriting, vocals
- Mozzik (Gramoz Aliu) – producing, songwriting, vocals
- Jumpa – songwriting, producing
- Alexander Wagner – songwriting
- Koen Heldens – mixing, mastering

== Charts ==
Chart performance for "Oh Digga"
Chart (2021)	Peak position
Albania (The Top List)	6
Austria (Ö3 Austria Top 40)	44
Germany (GfK)	27
Switzerland (Schweizer Hitparade)	27

== Release history ==
Release dates and formats for "Oh Digga"
Region	Date	Format(s)	Label	Ref.
Various	25 June 2021	Digital download; streaming	Independent	
