= Million $ =

2020 single by Dafina Zeqiri

Single by Dafina Zeqiri
- Language: Albanian
- Released: 20 August 2020
- Length: 2:49
- Label: Bzzz Entertainment; Moneyz
- Songwriters: Dafina Zeqiri; Elinel
- Producer: Deard Sylejmani

Dafina Zeqiri singles chronology
"Aman" (2020)	"Million $" (2020)	"Zili Zili" (2020)

Music video
- "Million $" on YouTube

"Million $" (/ˈmɪljənˈdɒlə/) is a song by Kosovar singer Dafina Zeqiri released as a single on 20 August 2020 by Bzzz Entertainment and Moneyz. "Million $" was written by Zeqiri and Albanian singer and songwriter Elinel. It was mastered, mixed and produced by Albanian producer Deard Sylejmani. An official music video was uploaded simultaneously with the single's release onto YouTube. The single experienced commercial success and peaked at number 20 in Albania and 82 in Switzerland.

== Background and composition ==
Running two minutes and forty-nine seconds, "Million $" was written by Albanian singer and songwriter Elinel alongside Zeqiri, who was also credited for the composition. Albanian producer Deard Sylejmani handled the producing, mastering and mixing process of "Million $". The Albanian-language song was announced during a social media post by Zeqiri in July 2020 and revealed the single's name to be "Million $". Its release for digital download and streaming followed on 20 August 2020 and was conducted by Bzzz Entertainment and Moneyz.

== Music video ==
An accompanying music video for "Million $" was uploaded to the official YouTube channel of Dafina Zeqiri on 20 August 2020 at 23:11 (CET). It features scenes of Dafina Zeqiri and three fellow women wearing outfits inspired by and adapted to Albanian culture. Upon its release, the music video was praised by critics. An editor of Revista Who praised Zeqiri's fashion as well as the incorporation of modern and traditional Albanian elements.

== Personnel ==
Credits adapted from Tidal and YouTube.

- Dafina Zeqiri – composing, songwriting, vocals
- Elinel – songwriting
- Deard Sylejmani – mastering, mixing, producing

== Track listing ==
- Digital download
1. "Million $" – 2:49

== Charts ==
Chart (2020)	Peak position
Albania (The Top List)	20
Switzerland (Schweizer Hitparade)	82
Switzerland (Spotify Charts)	67

== Release history ==
Region	Date	Format(s)	Label	Ref.
Various	20 August 2020	Digital download; streaming	Bzzz Entertainment; Moneyz	
