= Zili Zili =

2020 single by Dafina Zeqiri

Single by Dafina Zeqiri
- Language: Albanian
- Released: 23 October 2020
- Genre: Hip hop; pop
- Length: 2:46
- Label: Bzzz Entertainment; Moneyz
- Songwriters: Dafina Zeqiri; Elinel
- Producer: Rzon

Dafina Zeqiri singles chronology
| "Million $" (2020) | "Zili Zili" (2020) | "Mos shko" (2020) |

Music video
- "Zili Zili" on YouTube

"Zili Zili" (Albanian pronunciation: [ziˈli ziˈli]; transl. "Envy envy") is a song by Kosovar singer Dafina Zeqiri, released as a single on 23 October 2020 by Bzzz Entertainment and Moneyz. Musically, the song is an Albanian language rap and pop song incorporating Albanian, Eastern Europeand trap music elements in its instrumentation. It lyrically delves on the strength to get up also exploring empowerment and motivational themes. An official music video was uploaded simultaneously with the single's release onto YouTube. It experienced commercial success and peaked at number 5 in Albania.

== Background and composition ==
"Zili Zili", which runs 2 minutes and 46 seconds, was written by Albanian singer and songwriter Elinel alongside Zeqiri. Its production was solely handled by Albanian producer Rzon. "Zili Zili" was mastered at the GKG Audio Mastering Studio in Freising, Germany. It was announced during a social media post by Zeqiri in July 2020 and revealed the single's name to be "Zili Zili". Although, its availability for digital download and streaming followed on 23 October 2020 and was conducted by Bzzz Entertainment and Moneyz.

The Albanian language song is a "rap and pop anthem" incorporating Albanian pop, Eastern European and trap sounds. Zeqiri lyrically implies an empowerment message and sings about jealousy and ungrateful people, who didn't appreciate her as a friend and supporter. When asked in an interview with Bong Mines Entertainment about the meaning of the lyrics, she stated that, "its about jealousy for the hard-working artists in the music industry [...] who tend to be hated and falsely accused by new artists". She further said that, "the song is also about big artists who move on and don't really care about accusations since they have to focus on their work".

== Reception ==
Upon its release, "Zili Zili" was met with universal acclaim from music critics. Zangba Thomson from Bong Mines Entertainment commended the song's nature and Zeqiri's vocals and described the song a "catchy tune" possessing a "melodic instrumentation" with an urban "Albanian pop aroma". A writer for Aipate went on into praising the composition as well as the "catchy and energetic" instrumentation of the song. Various Albanian websites and magazines have similarly praised the singer's appearance and fashion in the music video describing it as "extravagant" and "flashy".

== Music video ==
An accompanying music video for "Zili Zili" was uploaded to the official YouTube channel of Dafina Zeqiri on 22 October 2020. Prior to the release, behind-the-scenes sequences of Zeqiri were released in early October 2020. The video features scenes of Zeqiri and four fellow backup dancer performing synchronized dance moves in an abandoned factory site. In the following scenes, two other models also makes appearance in the video.

== Personnel ==
Credits adapted from Tidal and YouTube.

- Dafina Zeqiri – composing, songwriting, vocals
- Elinel – songwriting
- Rzon – producing
- GKG Mastering – mastering

== Track listing ==
- Digital download
1. "Zili Zili" – 2:46

== Charts ==
| Chart (2020) | Peak position |
|---|---|
| Albania (The Top List) | 5 |

== Release history ==
| Region | Date | Format(s) | Label | Ref. |
|---|---|---|---|---|
| Various | 23 October 2020 | Digital download; streaming | Bzzz Entertainment; Moneyz | |
