= Buta (rapper) =

Kosovo-Albanian rapper (born 1995)

- Born: Betim Januzi; 29 March 1995 (age 31); Ferizaj, FR Yugoslavia (now Kosovo)
- Occupation: Rapper
- Years active: 2011 – present
- Musical career
- Genres: Hip hop; trap
- Labels: Uptown; Universal

Betim Januzi (Albanian: [bɛ'tim 'januzi]; born 29 March 1995), known professionally as Buta, is a Kosovo-Albanian rapper.

== Life and career ==
=== 1995–2017: Early life and career beginnings ===
Betim Januzi was born on 29 March 1995 into an Albanian family in the city of Ferizaj, then part of the FR Yugoslavia, present Kosovo. He discovered his passion for music at an early age and began writing songs at age 12. Januzi released his debut song in 2010, titled "Guillotine". In 2011 he released a number of singles under the name "butacrunk" on YouTube. In 2012, he joined the musical collective Ham Skwad Global and released his first song and music video named "Kqyre", part of his first mixtape Rolling Stoned Vol. I. In 2013 he released Rolling Stoned Vol. II. His early music is influenced by hip hop.

In 2014, Januzi released the singles "200 kmh" and "Flex". At the end of 2014 he moved to the capital city of Albania, Tirana, where he studied economics at the Mediterranean University of Albania.

In 2015 Januzi released his first EP named Z. Ndjenja, introducing his influences from the trap genre. Januzi claims he's always been into trap music and that he was inspired by artists such as Lil Wayne. In 2016, Januzi released the EP Dr. Zhivago. The song "Hashish Thaqi" from the EP is one of his most streamed songs of all-time. In late 2016 he released the EP Nino Brown, in collaboration with Pllug Bois.

In February 2017, he signed a contract with the Albanian music label Nesër Music. In July 2017, he announced his follow-up single "Mbi Re" in collaboration with Albanian rapper Ledri Vula and peaked at number 17 in Albanian music charts. On 1 May 2017, he released the mixtape Pranvere / Vere '17 with hits such as "Sorry" and a feature from MC Kresha in the song "Opps". In November 2017, Januzi released the single "Z. Ndjenja 2". In December 2017, he collaborated with German-Albanian rapper Dardan on the single "Tango & Cash", which peaked at 84 in Albanian music charts.

=== 2018–present: Upcoming album and continued success ===
In 2018, Januzi almost released seven singles, including "Anuloje", which experienced moderate success throughout the Albanian-speaking world. In May 2018, he collaborated a second time with Albanian rapper Ledri Vula on the number one single "Merri Merri". In August 2018, he performed at the Sunny Hill Festival in Pristina along other acclaimed artists such as Action Bronson, Martin Garrix and Dua Lipa. The following year, he premiered the singles "24/7", reaching the number 12 in Albania, and "Edi Rama", which became his second number one single.

In December 2019, "Edi Rama" was released and went on to reach number one in Albania simultaneously becoming the rapper's second number one single in his native country. He signed a record deal with the German subsidiary of Universal Music in December 2021 to release his upcoming third studio album.

== Artistry ==
The musical work of Januzi incorporates hip hop and trap music. He cites a wide array of musical artists as influences, including numerous hip hop performers, such as 50 Cent, Cam’ron, Gucci Mane, Lil Wayne, T.I. and Young Jeezy. He takes influence from the different genres of music he discovered when he was young, including from the hip hop and new school movements.

== Discography ==
=== Albums ===
==== Mixtapes ====
- Pranvere / Vere '17 (2017)
- Vjeshte / Dimer '18 (2018)
- Pranvere / Vere '25 (2025)
- Vjeshte / Dimer '25 (2025)
- Plus Ultra (2025)

==== Extended plays ====
- Z. Ndjenja (2016)
- Punë Skuadre (2016)
- Dr. Zhivago (2016)
- Z. Ndjenja 2 (2020)
- Babayega (2020)
- Manuali (2023)
- The Lounge (2023)
- The Crashout (2024)
- B&E (2026)

=== Singles ===
==== As lead artist ====
List of singles as lead artist, with selected chart positions
Title	Year	Peak chart positions	Album
Title	Year	ALB	Album
"Swag City"	2012	—N/a	Non-album single
"Kqyre"	2012	—N/a	Non-album single
"Rune Qafën"	2013	—N/a	Non-album single
"Mellow"	2013	—N/a	Non-album single
"Birra X Jointa"	2013	—N/a	Non-album single
"200 Kmh"	2014	—N/a	Non-album single
"Për Trip"	2015	—N/a	Non-album single
"N'rregull"	2015	—N/a	Non-album single
"Hashish Thaci"	2016	—	Non-album single
"Ndjekja"	2017	—	Non-album single
"Mbi Re" (with Ledri Vula)	2017	17	Non-album single
"Z. Ndjenja 2"	2017	—	Non-album single
"Tango & Cash" (featuring Dardan)	2017	84	Non-album single
"Cash In/Out" (with S4MM)	2018	—	Non-album single
"Fakt"	2018	—	Non-album single
"Anderr / Pluto"	2018	—	Non-album single
"Merri Merri" (with Ledri Vula)	2018	1	Non-album single
"Anuloje" (with DJ Flow)	2018	10	Non-album single
"Ok Ok"	2018	—	Non-album single
"Pse Ke Ardh Ktu"	2018	—	Non-album single
"24/7"	2019	12	Non-album single
"Uzi" (with Skerdi)	2019	—	Non-album single
"My Bro" (with Gjiko)	2019	—	Non-album single
"Edi Rama"	2019	1	Non-album single
"Drip" (with Singi)	2020	—	Non-album single
"Blero" (with Ago)	2020	—	Non-album single
"Gips"	2020	—	Non-album single
"Testom"	2020	—	Non-album single
"Policine"	2020	—	Non-album single
"Posht/Nalt"	2021	—	Non-album single
"Telebingo"	2021	—	Non-album single
"Rich"	2022	—	Non-album single
"5AM" (with Era Istrefi)	2022	—	Non-album single
"—" denotes a recording that did not chart or was not released in that territory.

==== As featured artist ====
List of singles as featured artist
Title	Year	Album
"Fr Cypher" (DJ Kollink featuring Ago, Limi, Getinjo, SL, Donat and Buta)	2013	Non-album single
"Mucho Guapo" (Hardy featuring Francky Loot and Buta)	2016	Non-album single
