= Rio (Ledri Vula song) =

2019 single by Ledri Vula

- The official cover art for "Rio"

Single by Ledri Vula
- Language: Albanian
- Released: 4 June 2019
- Genre: Pop
- Length: 2:38
- Label: AVD Digital; Nesër
- Songwriter: Ledri Vula
- Producer: Big Bang

Ledri Vula singles chronology
"Aje" (2018)	"Rio" (2019)	"Kiss Kiss" (2019)

Music video
- "Rio" on YouTube

"Rio" is a song recorded by Kosovar rapper Ledri Vula. Lasting two minutes and thirty eight seconds, the song was solely written by the rapper himself and produced by Albanian producer Big Bang. A pop song, its lyrics talks about the rapper telling his unidentified girlfriend not to be so hard on him. An official music video for the song was shot in Brazil and was uploaded on 4 June 2019 onto YouTube in order to accompany the single's release. It visually features the rapper and Albanian model Lorena Haliti celebrating in a colorful alley of Rio de Janeiro together with Samba and Capoeira dancers.

== Background and composition ==
"Rio" was solely written by Ledri Vula himself and produced by his collaborator Big Bang. Swedish producer Johan Bejerholm was furthermore helmed for the record's mixing and mastering process. In terms of music notation, it was composed in 4/4 time and is performed in the key of A♭ minor with a tempo of 125 beats per minute. An Albanian language song, its lyrics talks about the rapper telling his unidentified girlfriend not to be so hard on him.

== Music video ==
A screenshot of a scene in the music video portraying Vula and Albanian model Lorena Haliti during the main video show.

The accompanying music video was directed by Besian Durmishi and premiered onto the official YouTube channel of Ledri Vula on 4 June 2019, where it has since amassed a total of 11 million views. For further promotion, the song was played on the German radio station RadioMonster.FM on 17 July 2019.

The colorful clip was filmed during summer in various locations in the city of Rio de Janeiro, Brazil, and features the guest appearance from Albanian model Lorena Haliti. The visual opens with a waving Brazilian flag, and Vula walking the stairs straight up. Vula is next shown walking through his charming surroundings until he arrives to a colorful alley with fellow Samba and Capoeira dancers being present. Fellow scenes show the rapper driving a red Ferrari to pick Haliti and performing to the song alongside her and the aforementioned dancers in the alley before the music video ends.

== Charts ==
Chart (2019)	Peak position
Albania (The Top List)	2

== Release history ==
Region	Date	Format(s)	Label	Ref.
Various	4 June 2019	Digital download; streaming	AVD Digital; Nesër	
