= Edhe ti =

2020 single by Tayna and Mozzik

Single by Tayna and Mozzik
- Released: 22 January 2020
- Genre: Hip hop/Rap
- Length: 3:15
- Label: Friends Entertainment; Onima
- Songwriters: Tayna; Mozzik
- Producer: Cricket

Tayna singles chronology
"Sorry" (2019)	"Edhe ti" (2020)

Mozzik singles chronology
"Zemra Ime" (2019)	"Edhe ti" (2020)

Music video
- "Edhe ti" on YouTube

"Edhe ti" (Albanian pronunciation: [ɛðɛ ti]; transl. "You too") is a song recorded by Kosovar rappers Tayna and Mozzik. The record was entirely written by the aforementioned rappers and solely produced by Kosovar producer Cricket. The mastering and mixing process was helmed by Albanian producer Avaxus. An Albanian language rap song, it lyrically talks about a toxic relationship and its positive and negative emotions that come with that. The official music video for the song was shot in Kosovo and was uploaded on 22 January 2020 onto YouTube in order to accompany the single's release.

== Background and composition ==
"Edhe ti" was written by Tayna and Mozzik and produced by Kosovo-Albanian producer Cricket. Lorenc Aliaj, also known as Avaxus, was additionally hired for the song's mastering process. The song was composed in 4/4 time and is performed in the key of A♭ minor in common time with a tempo of 100 beats per minute. It lyrically talks about a toxic love and its resulting positive and negative feelings that come with that.

== Music video and promotion ==
The accompanying music video for "Edhe ti" was premiered onto the YouTube channel of Friends Entertainment on the 22 January 2020, however, it was leaked onto the internet one day before. The rappers eventually confirmed the aforementioned during a social media post on 14 January 2020 and revealed that the single would be released on 28 January 2020. After the release, the song was viewed 2.1 million times in its first 21 hours.

== Charts ==
Chart (2020)	Peak position
Albania (The Top List)	2
Germany (GfK)	90
Switzerland (Schweizer Hitparade)	26

== Release history ==
Region	Date	Format(s)	Label	Ref.
Various	22 January 2020	Digital download; streaming	Friends Entertainment; Onima	
