= Toto (Noizy song) =

2018 single by Noizy featuring RAF Camora

Single by Noizy featuring RAF Camora
- Language: Albanian; English; German
- Released: 15 June 2018
- Length: 3:25
- Label: Warner Germany
- Songwriters: Rigels Rajku; Raphael Ragucci
- Producers: Junior à la prod; Sany San

Noizy featuring RAF Camora singles chronology
"Luj edhe pak" (2018)	"Toto" (2018)	"Peace & Love" (2018)

RAF Camora singles chronology
"Fame" (2018)	"Toto" (2018)	"Paradies" (2018)

Music video
- "Toto" on YouTube

"Toto" is a song by Albanian rapper Noizy featuring Austrian rapper RAF Camora. It was released as a single on 15 June 2018 by Warner Music Germany.

== Background and composition ==
"Toto" was written by Noizy and RAF Camora and composed by both rappers alongside Junior Bula Monga and Sany Kaou. It was produced by Junior à la prod and Sany San and mixed by Lex Barkey. It was made available for digital download and streaming on 15 June 2018 through Warner Germany.

== Music video and promotion ==
An accompanying music video for "Toto" was uploaded to the official YouTube channel of Noizy on 15 June 2018. In March 2019, Noizy was invited as special guest to perform the single live during a concert of RAF Camora and German rapper Bonez MC at the Lanxess Arena in Cologne, Germany.

== Personnel ==
Credits adapted from Tidal.

- Rigels Rajku – composing, songwriting, vocals
- Raphael Ragucci – composing, songwriting, vocals
- Junior à la prod – producing
- Sany San – producing
- Junior Bula Monga – composing
- Sany Kaou – composing
- Lex Barkey – mixing

== Track listing ==
- Digital download
1. "Toto" – 3:25

== Charts ==
Chart (2018)	Peak position
Austria (Ö3 Austria Top 40)	2
Germany (GfK)	18
Switzerland (Schweizer Hitparade)	4
Switzerland (iTunes Charts)	29
Switzerland (Spotify Charts)	4

== Certifications ==
Region	Certification	Certified units/sales
Austria (IFPI Austria)	Gold	15,000^{‡}
^{‡} Sales+streaming figures based on certification alone.

== Release history ==
Region	Date	Format(s)	Label	Ref.
Various	15 June 2018	Digital download; streaming	Warner Germany	
