= Aman (song) =

2020 single by Dafina Zeqiri featuring Ledri Vula and Lumi B

Single by Dafina Zeqiri
- Language: Albanian
- English title: "Have Mercy"
- Released: 1 July 2020
- Length: 2:48
- Label: Bzzz Entertainment; Moneyz
- Songwriters: Dafina Zeqiri; Ledri Vula; Lumi B
- Producer: Deard Sylejmani

Dafina Zeqiri singles chronology
"A je pendu" (2020)	"Aman" (2020)	"Million $" (2020)

Ledri Vula singles chronology
"DMP" (2020)	"Aman" (2020)	"Sot Sot Sot" (2020)

Lumi B singles chronology
"Lamborghini Hustle" (2019)	"Aman" (2020)	"Pate" (2020)

Music video
- "Aman" on YouTube

"Aman" (Albanian pronunciation: [aˈman]; transl. Have Mercy) is a song by Kosovar singer and songwriter Dafina Zeqiri featuring Kosovar rappers Ledri Vula and Lumi B released as a single on 1 July 2020 by Bzzz Entertainment and Moneyz. The song was written and composed by the three latter and mastered, mixed and produced by producer Deard Sylejmani. An official music video was uploaded simultaneously with the single's release onto YouTube. The single experienced commercial success and peaked at number 4 in Albania and 79 in Switzerland.

== Background and composition ==
Following the announcement of her upcoming studio album, Dafinë moj, Zeqiri uploaded a photo on her social media where she teased "Aman", including a behind-the-scenes shot of the music video. "Aman", which runs two minutes and forty-eight seconds, was composed and written by Kosovo-Albanian musicians Dafina Zeqiri, Ledri Vula and Lumi B. The Albanian-language song was mastered, mixed and produced by Albanian producer Deard Sylejmani. It was made available for digital download and streaming on 1 July 2020 by Bzzz Entertainment and Moneyz.

== Music video ==
Produced by Entermedia, an accompanying music video for "Aman" was premiered onto the official YouTube channel of Dafina Zeqiri on 1 July 2020 at 15:00 (CET). Albanian international fashion designer, Drenusha Xharra, created Zeqiri's outfits in the music video, while hair styling and make-up was done by Albanian make-up artist Arbër Bytyqi. Upon its release, the video entered the YouTube Top 100 chart in Austria and Germany.

== Personnel ==
Credits adapted from Tidal and YouTube.

- Dafina Zeqiri – composing, songwriting, vocals
- Ledri Vula – composing, songwriting, vocals
- Lumi B – composing, songwriting, vocals
- Deard Sylejmani – mastering, mixing, producing

== Track listing ==
- Digital download
1. "Aman" – 2:48

== Charts ==
Chart (2020)	Peak position
Switzerland (Schweizer Hitparade)	79
Switzerland (Spotify Charts)	82

== Release history ==
Region	Date	Format(s)	Label	Ref.
Various	1 July 2020	Digital download; streaming	Bzzz Entertainment; Moneyz	
