= Getinjo =

Kosovar rapper (born 1991)

- Born: Getoar Aliu; 13 June 1991 (age 34); Uroševac, SFR Yugoslavia (now Ferizaj, Kosovo)
- Occupations: Rapper; singer; songwriter
- Years active: 2007–present
- Relatives: Mozzik (brother)
- Musical career
- Genres: Hip hop; rap

Getoar Aliu (born 13 June 1991), known professionally as Getinjo, and previously as Ghetto and Young Ghetto, is a Kosovan hip hop artist and songwriter.

== Early life ==
Aliu was born in Ferizaj, Kosovo, in 1991. He is the brother of rapper Mozzik. In 1993, his family moved to Germany, settling in the city of Bocholt. During his early education, he began writing lyrics and poetry, participating in school-related cultural events.

== Career ==
In 2004, he and his family returned to Kosovo and settled in his hometown of Ferizaj. He began writing lyrics influenced by his personal experiences and surroundings. He recorded his first song in 2007 in a studio in Pristina.

In December 2022, Getinjo participated as a contestant in the first season of the reality show Big Brother VIP Kosova.

== Discography ==
- 2013: Kaos
- 2013: Femna
- 2014: NO
- 2014: My Love
- 2015: Lavire
- 2015: Sjena mo (featuring Eva)
- 2015: Kukllat (featuring Endri)
- 2016: Njeri (featuring Nika)
- 2016: O moj pare
- 2016: Monster (featuring Baby G)
- 2016: Tony Montana (featuring Mozzik)
- 2016: Ku je (featuring Kida)
- 2017: Helem
- 2017: Sexy
