= Netët e Klipit Shqiptar =

Netet e Klipit Shqiptar
- Awarded for: Best in Music videos from Albanian inhabited lands
- Country: Albania
- Presented by: DeliArt Association
- First award: 2002

The Albanian Videoclip Festival (Albanian:Netet e Klipit Shqiptar) is an Albanian music awards event honoring the best of Albanian music videos from the Albanian diaspora. It made its debut in 2002 and ever since has been broadcast on all the main Albanian TV outlets around the Balkans. The event is based in Tirana, Albania and produced by DeliArt Association.
