= Kida (singer) =

Kosovo-Albanian singer (born 1997)

- Born: 21 December 1997 (age 28); Prishtina
- Occupation: Singer
- Years active: 2014 – present
- Musical career
- Instruments: Vocals
- Labels: Yellowcake Music Group, Sony

Orhidea Latifi (Albanian: [ɔɾhiˈdɛa laˈtifi]; born 21 December 1997), known professionally as Kida, is a Kosovo-Albanian singer.

== Life and career ==
Kida was born as Orhidea Latifi on 21 December 1997 into an Albanian family in the city of Rahovec, then part of the FR Yugoslavia, present-day Kosovo. In July 2020, her singles "Paranoia" and "Pishmon" featuring Kosovo-Albanian rapper Mozzik reached number one in Albania and peaked at number 56 and 98 in Switzerland, respectively. Featuring pop and R&B music, her follow-up single "Drunk" peaked at number seven in her native country.

Kida released her debut studio album, Orchidé, on 21 December 2021. In June 2021, the albums's lead single "Lila" featuring German rapper Samra reached number ten in Albania and had peaked within the top 35 in Austria, Germany and Switzerland. The follow-up non-album release "Dale" with Kosovo-Albanian singers Butrint Imeri and Ledri Vula peaked at number one on the native Top 100 in July 2021.

== Discography ==
=== Albums ===
List of studio albums, with album details
Title	Album details
Orchide	Released: 21 December 2021; Label: Urban; Format: Digital download, streaming

=== Singles ===
==== As lead artist ====
List of singles as lead artist, with selected chart positions
Title	Year	Peak chart positions				Album
Title	Year	ALB	AUT	GER	SWI	Album
"Murder"	2014	—N/a	—	—	—	Non-album singles
"Rikthejm na" (featuring MC Kresha)	2014	—N/a	—	—	—	Non-album singles
"O'najr"	2014	—N/a	—	—	—	Non-album singles
"M'ke rrejt"	2014	—N/a	—	—	—	Non-album singles
"Boni zo"	2015	—N/a	—	—	—	Non-album singles
"Ski ide"	2015	4	—	—	—	Non-album singles
"Mi Amore" (featuring Ermal Fejzullahu)	2016	6	—	—	—	Non-album singles
"Ja kem nis"	2016	10	—	—	—	Non-album singles
"Uh Baby" (with Xhensila)	2016	1	—	—	—	Non-album singles
"Andërr"	2017	4	—	—	—	Non-album singles
"Pe du"	2017	6	—	—	—	Non-album singles
"Kce"	2017	—	—	—	—	Non-album singles
"Ti"	2018	1	—	—	—	Non-album singles
"Bileten"	2018	—	—	—	—	Non-album singles
"Mas"	2018	—	—	—	—	Non-album singles
"Merri krejt"	2018	—	—	—	—	Non-album singles
"Ka je"	2018	—	—	—	—	Non-album singles
"Deja Vu" (featuring Lyrical Son)	2019	1	—	—	—	Non-album singles
"Tela" (featuring Ermal Fejzullahu)	2019	1	—	—	—	Non-album singles
"Malli"	2019	3	—	—	—	Non-album singles
"Moti"	2019	11	—	—	—	Non-album singles
"Paranoia" (featuring Mozzik)	2020	1	—	—	56	Non-album singles
"Pishmon" (featuring Mozzik)	2020	1	—	—	98	Non-album singles
"Edhe sa"	2020	—	—	—	—	Non-album singles
"Drunk"	2020	7	—	—	—	Non-album singles
"Lila" (with Samra)	2021	10	31	23	12	Orchidé
"Dale" (with Butrint Imeri and Ledri Vula)	2021	1	—	—	13	Non-album singles
"Dinero"	2021	10	—	—	—	Orchidé
"Ike"	2021	15	—	—	54	Orchidé
"Mo jo"	2021	4	—	—	—	Orchidé
"Tdu" (featuring Ledri Vula)	2022	2	—	—	34	Non-album singles
"Luje Belin" (with Dafina Zeqiri)	2022	30	—	—	49	Non-album singles
"AM" (with Butrint Imeri)	2022	25	—	—	48	Non-album singles
"PM" (with Butrint Imeri)	2022	25	—	—	61	Non-album singles
"—" denotes a recording that did not chart or was not released in that territory.
