= Yll Limani =

Kosovar Singer and Songwriter (born 1994)

- Born: 24 September 1994 (age 32); Pristina, Kosovo
- Occupations: Singer, songwriter
- Years active: 2011–present
- Relatives: Mufail Limani (father)
- Musical career
- Instruments: Vocals
- Label: Three60

Yll Limani (Albanian: [yɫ liˈmani]; born 24 September 1994) is a Kosovan singer and songwriter.

== Life and career ==
=== 1994–2020: Early life and career beginnings ===
Yll Limani was born on 24 September 1994 into an Albanian family in the city of Pristina, Kosovo. His father, Mufail Limani, was a member of the Albanian band Minatori. The singer's public singing debut was at the first season of The Voice of Albania in 2011, followed by an appearance on the 9th edition of the Albanian music contest Top Fest in 2012. Upon a three-year hiatus, Limani's first single as a lead artist, "Single" featuring Kosovo-Albanian rapper Gent Fatali, was released in January 2015. The singer made his first appearance on Albania's Top 100 chart with "Pritëm se po vi" in July 2016, which debuted and peaked within the top three. Following this, the Albanian broadcaster, Radio Televizioni Shqiptar (RTSH), reported in November 2016 that Limani was selected among the 25 contestants to compete in the 55th edition of Festivali i Këngës in December with the song "Shiu". Finishing in third place, the single peaked at number 34 in March 2017 as his second charting record in Albania.

In July 2019, he scored his second number-one single with the release of "Nuk po kalojka", a collaboration with composers Aida Baraku, Kevin Field, Armend Rexhepagiqi alongside Macedonian producer Darko Dimitrov. The Sunny Hill Festival in Pristina approached Limani a month later, and went on to perform at the festival sharing stage with other acclaimed artists, such as Miley Cyrus, Calvin Harris and Dua Lipa.

=== 2021–present: Lshoja zanin and continued success ===
Limani was featured on Cricket's singles "Ndoshta" and "Pray" in February 2021 with the former peaking at number one and the latter becoming a top 30 single in Albania. He released "A ki me rrejt", his first single as a lead artist in over six months after "Leje", in April 2021 and reached number two. The follow-up collaborations, "E di" and "Marre", with Albanian singer Elvana Gjata were released in June 2021 and "E di" peaked at number one for three consecutive weeks. In October 2021, Limani announced that he had started working on his debut extended play. A month later, he was invited to join Swiss rapper Loredana's Red Bull Symphonic concert in Lucerne, Switzerland. Throughout the year, the singer contributed to Albanian singer Arilena Ara's debut studio album, Pop Art The Album. His debut extended play, Lshoja zanin, was eventually released on 5 December 2021. "Lshoja zonin" from the record peaked at number one on the Albanian Top 100. Limani contributed credited songwriting to the Cypriot entry, "Ela", for the Eurovision Song Contest 2022 by Greek singer Andromache.

== Discography ==
=== Albums ===
List of studio albums, with selected chart positions
Title	Album details	Peak chart positions
Title	Album details	SWI
Tjetër	Released: 21 December 2023; Label: Three60; Formats: Digital download and streaming	19
Thirrëm sot ose nesër	Released: 18 December 2025; Label: Three60; Formats: Digital download and streaming	7

=== Extended plays ===
List of extended plays, with details
Title	Album details
Lshoja zanin	Released: 5 December 2021; Label: Three60; Formats: Digital download and streaming

==== Collaborative extended plays ====
List of studio albums, with selected chart positions
Title	Album details	Peak chart positions	
Title	Album details	AUT	SWI
Vera me ty (with Dhurata Dora)	Released: 11 July 2024; Label: Three60; Formats: Digital download and streaming	65	4

=== Singles ===
==== As lead artist ====
List of singles as lead artist, with selected chart positions
Title	Year	Peak chart positions			Album
Title	Year	ALB	GRE	SWI	Album
"Single" (featuring Gent Fatali)	2015	—N/a	—	—	Non-album singles
"Emrin Ma Ke Thirr"	2015	—N/a	—	—	Non-album singles
"I Thash Asaj"	2015	—N/a	—	—	Non-album singles
"Najher"	2016	—	—	—	Non-album singles
"Pritëm Se Po Vi"	2016	3	—	—	Non-album singles
"Shiu"	2016	34	—	—	Non-album singles
"Ke Pi Sonte Shumë"	2017	34	—	—	Non-album singles
"Dritat" (featuring 2po2)	2017	1	—-	—	Non-album singles
"Ty"	2018	—	—	—	Non-album singles
"A Ja Ka Vlejt"	2018	34	—	—	Non-album singles
"Prej Se Jena Nda"	2018	—	—	—	Non-album singles
"Vaj"	2018	15	—	—	Non-album singles
"Friday Night" (with Cricket)	2018	—	—	—	Non-album singles
"Harrom"	2019	19	—	—	Non-album singles
"Nuk Po Kalojka"	2019	1	—	—	Non-album singles
"Pse Je Me To"	2019	17	—	—	Non-album singles
"Engjej"	2019	1	—	—	Non-album singles
"I Kom Kall"	2020	—	—	—	Non-album singles
"Pate" (with Lumi B)	2020	—	—	—	Non-album singles
"Buzët E Kuqe"	2020	1	—	—	Non-album singles
"Leje"	2020	1	—	—	Non-album singles
"A Ki Me Rrejt"	2021	2	—	—	Non-album singles
"9"	2022	1	—	—	Non-album singles
"Alkool" (with Noizy)	2022	—	—	38	Non-album singles
"Malet"	2022	2	—	97	Non-album singles
"Kriminele" (with Loredana)	2022	9	—	58	Non-album singles
"Ulu"	2023	1	—	—	Non-album singles
"U Kry"	2023	3	—	—	Non-album singles
"Kaje" (with Dafina Zeqiri)	2023	7	—	12	Non-album singles
"Për Kon Je Zbukuru?"	2023	3	—	—	Non-album singles
"Spiti" (with Sidarta)	2023	9	9	—	Non-album singles
"Merri krejt"	2024	—	—	71	Non-album singles
"—" denotes a recording that did not chart or was not released in that territory.

==== As featured artist ====
List of singles as featured artist, with selected chart positions
Title	Year	Peak chart positions	Album
Title	Year	ALB	Album
"Pretty Woman" (Etnon featuring Dj Dagz and Yll Limani)	2014	—N/a	Non-album single
"Besom" (Dj Dagz and DJ PM featuring Yll Limani)	2017	—	Non-album single
"S'ka dashni" (Dani featuring Yll Limani)	2018	—	Non-album single
"Krejt ti fala" (Majk featuring Yll Limani)	2018	1	Non-album single
"A a don hala" (Tuna featuring Yll Limani)	2019	12	Fortuna
"Mos shko" (Dafina Zeqiri featuring Yll Limani)	2020	4	Non-album single
"Ndoshta" (Cricket featuring Yll Limani)	2021	1	Non-album single
"Pray" (Cricket featuring Yll Limani)	2021	30	Non-album single
"E di" (Elvana Gjata featuring Yll Limani)	2021	1	Non-album single
"Marre" (Elvana Gjata featuring Yll Limani)	2021	—	Non-album single
"As 1 minut" (Ermal Fejzullahu featuring Yll Limani)	2021	—	Non-album single
"—" denotes a recording that did not chart or was not released in that territory.

=== Other charted songs ===
List of other charted songs, with selected chart positions
Title	Year	Peak chart positions		Album
Title	Year	ALB	SWI	Album
"Lshoja zanin"	2021	1	—	Lshoja zanin
"Qaj"	2021	2	—	Lshoja zanin
"Gënjeshtare"	2021	12	—	Lshoja zanin
"Vonë"	2021	13	—	Lshoja zanin
"Çka nëse"	2021	10	—	Lshoja zanin
"Malli" (with Dhurata Dora)	2024	—	19	Vera me ty
"Ku je nis" (with Dhurata Dora)	2024	—	95	Vera me ty
"Nal nal" (with Dhurata Dora)	2024	—	90	Vera me ty
"—" denotes a recording that did not chart or was not released in that territory.

=== Songwriter credits ===
List of songs as a songwriter
Song	Year	Artist	Album	Ref.
"Aligator"	2021	Arilena Ara	Pop Art The Album	
"Ke me mungu"	2021	Arilena Ara	Pop Art The Album	
"Murderer"	2021	Arilena Ara	Pop Art The Album	
"Ela"	2022	Andromache	Non-album single	
"Ciao"	2022	Nora Istrefi	Non-album single	
"Si na"	2023	Elvana Gjata	Non-album single	
"Sekreti i tij"	2023	Teuta Statovci	Non-album single	
