= Dafina Zeqiri =

Swedish-born Kosovar singer (born 1989)

- Born: 14 April 1989 (age 37); Varberg, Sweden
- Other name: Duffye
- Occupations: Singer, songwriter
- Years active: 2008–present
- Notable work: Discography
- Musical career
- Genres: Pop; R&B; soul; trap
- Label: Moneyz

Dafina Zeqiri (Albanian: [daˈfina zɛˈciɾi]; born 14 April 1989), also known mononymously as Dafina, is a Swedish-born Kosovar singer and songwriter who predominantly sings in Albanian.

Dafina Zeqiri married businessman Kreshnik Gjergji in 2024; the couple have a son named Daskan and are currently expecting their second child.

== Life and career ==
Dafina Zeqiri was born on 14 April 1989 into an Albanian family from Kosovo in the city of Varberg, Sweden. Her siblings are Tringa Zeqiri and Besa Tafari née Zeqiri. Dafina's father, Nebih Bajraktari, left her family at a very early age and was absent since then. He later gave a public speech asking her to forgive him, although Dafina never made any replies. Her mother is Melihate Zeqiri, a former singer in the 1980s.

In 2007, Zeqiri performed at Polifest Festival and was nominated for her song, "Rrallë e Përmallë," and eventually won the competition. In 2008, Zeqiri received a BOOM Award Nomination for her song "Adios," and was awarded with the audience award. In the same year, she launched her first album titled Knock Down. Shortly afterwards, in her continued participation in Kënga Magjike, she received the "First Magic" award for her song, "Bateritë".

Zeqiri's success continued with two collaborations with singers Blero & F-Kay with the song "La Vida Loca" and Capital T & 2po2, "Shumë Naltë". In May 2009, she won "Best RNB" in Top Fest 6 with the song "Dua që ta di". During 2009, two of her clips were very successful: "Shumë Larg" (directed by Stamps Pictures) and "Amazing Girl" (directed by Entermedia). In 2010, she traveled to Australia to shoot the music video for "Rock This Club." In December 2011, Zeqiri released the song D&G included, a song she has made with Albanian rapper Getoar Selimi. She has already launched "Tonight," which is also included in the new album "Just Me". She launched 2 new music videos "Veç Ti" and "Bloodah".

=== 2015–present: King EP and Dafinë moj ===
With the release of "Liri" in March 2016, she received an award for the best production at the 2016 Netët e Klipit Shqiptar gala in Tirana, Albania. In 2016, Dafina moved to Manhattan in the United States. Following several months spent in the United States, Zeqiri released her first extended play, King, in November 2017. The record was aided by its lead single "Four Season" in March 2017, which reached number three in Albania. The single's music video featured a guest appearance by Moroccan-American rapper French Montana. Titled "Told Ya", the second single from the extended play, peaked at number one in October 2017. The non-album release "Ti e din" followed in December 2017 and eventually reached number two in the same month. In the span of 2018, the singer released four subsequent singles, "Fuego", "Kalon", "Kurgjo nuk kallxojna" and "Alo", with the latter two reaching the top 35 in Albania.

In March 2020, Zeqiri was featured on Albanian producer Cricket's "Një herë në jetë", which peaked at number 5 in Albania and 132 on the Spotify charts in Switzerland. In June 2020, she announced her upcoming second studio album, Dafinë moj. Later in July 2020, she released Aman, the lead single from Dafinë moj, a collaboration with Albanian rappers Ledri Vula and Lumi B, which peaked at number 4 in Albania and 79 in Switzerland. The second single, titled "Million $", was moderately successful and reached number 20 in Albania and 82 in Switzerland. Two subsequent singles, "Zili Zili" and "Mos shko" featuring Albanian singer Yll Limani, were released from the album. "Zili Zili" reached the top five, while "Mos shko" peaked at number 4 in Albania. In September 2021, Zeqiri was nominated for the 2020 Swedish government's music export prize.

== Artistry ==
Zeqiri is often referred to as a "diva of Albanian music". The singer has cited American singer Aaliyah as her major musical and stylistic influence. Other inspirations include Ciara, Destiny's Child, Lauryn Hill, Michael Jackson, TLC and the Spice Girls. Her musical style has generally been regarded as R&B and soul also having incorporated a variety of other genres into her music, including electropop, trap and urban Albanian pop.

== Activism ==
Zeqiri is an advocate of raising awareness for health and mental health issues beyond her community, including sharing her experiences with depression. She has also expressed her support for the LGBT community in the world and the Albanian-speaking Balkans. In 2020, she extended her support to the Black Lives Matter movement, in connection with the wider George Floyd protests.

== Discography ==
- Knock Down (2008)
- Just Me (2011)
- Dafinë moj (2021)
- The Absolute Vol. 1 (2024)
