= Mozzik =

Kosovo-Albanian rapper (born 1995)

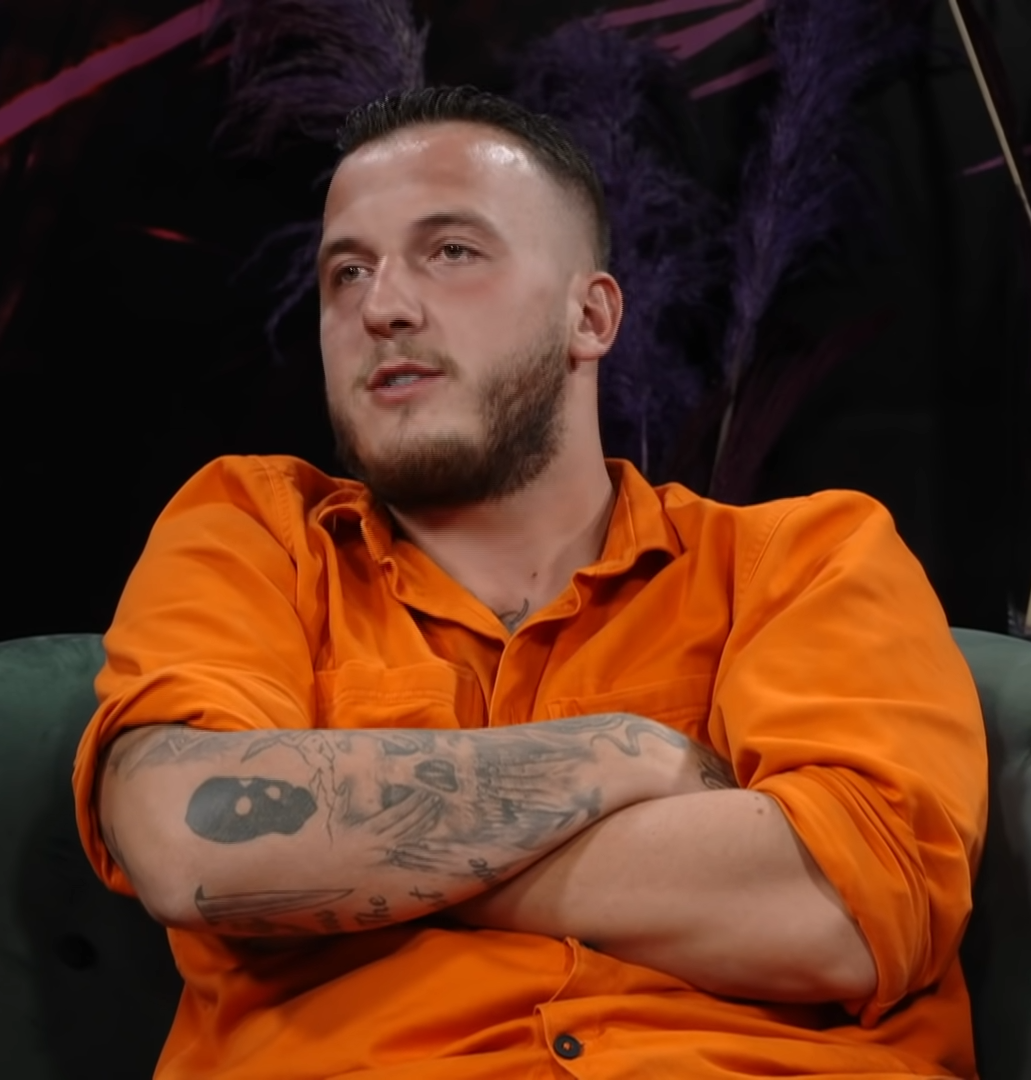
- Mozzik in 2020

Background information
- Born: Gramoz Aliu; 29 September 1995 (age 31); Ferizaj, FR Yugoslavia (present-day Kosovo)
- Genre: Hip hop
- Occupations: Rapper; singer; songwriter
- Years active: 2014–present
- Labels: 2 Euro Gang; Sony
- Spouse: Loredana Zefi (m. 2018; div. 2021)

Gramoz Aliu (Albanian: [ɡɾaˈmɔz aˈli.u]; born 29 September 1995), known professionally as Mozzik, is a Kosovo-Albanian rapper and singer. Born and raised in Ferizaj, he began making music at an early age before pursuing a professional career as a rapper. He rose to prominence in Albanian-speaking countries after signing a contract with On Records. Aliu later earned popularity in German-speaking Europe, as he collaborated with his wife and fellow rapper Loredana. Their collaborations achieved commercial success in Austria, Germany and Switzerland, and topped the charts in the aforementioned countries. Due to his success, he signed contract with Sony Music Germany and announced his debut studio album to be released in 2020.

== Life and career ==
=== 1995–2020: Breakthrough and Mozzart ===
Mozzik was born as Gramoz Aliu on 29 September 1995 into an Albanian family in Ferizaj, then part of the Federal Republic of Yugoslavia, present-day Kosovo. He has an elder brother, Getoar Aliu, who is also a rapper and songwriter, known professionally as Getinjo. Mozzik was signed by On Records, Mozzik rose to widespread attention in the Albanian-speaking Balkans. In January 2020, Mozzik announced an upcoming single in collaboration with Kosovo-Albanian rapper Tayna during a social media post. The aforementioned single, "Edhe ti", was premiered in the same month and entered the music charts in Albania, Germany and Switzerland. In February 2020, he released his follow-up singles "Auf Wiedersehen" and "Tom & Jerry", the first marking his first single entirely written in the German language.

=== 2021–present: No Rich Parents and Lamboziki ===
Mozzik released his first collaborative album, No Rich Parents, with Swiss rapper Loredana in September 2021. Five successful singles, "Rosenkrieg", "Oh Digga", "Nëse Don", "Mit Mir" and "Immer Wenn Es Regnet", preceded the record prior to its release. Announced in October 2021, Lamboziki, Mozzik's second studio album, was issued in February 2022, featuring the commercially successful singles "Shko", "Bonjour Madame" with Albanian singer Noizy and "Ska" with Albanian singer Elvana Gjata.

== Personal life ==
He married Swiss rapper Loredana Zefi in 2018. Loredana gave birth to their daughter in December 2018 in her hometown of Lucerne, Switzerland. The couple separated in October 2019 but they collaborated on their 2021 album No Rich Parents.

He is in a relationship with Lotina Haziri, the daughter of Kosovo politician Lutfi Haziri.

== Discography ==
- Mozzart (2020)
- No Rich Parents (2021)
- Lamboziki (2022)
- Mergimstar (2024)
