= Ardian Bujupi =

German-Kosovar singer and songwriter

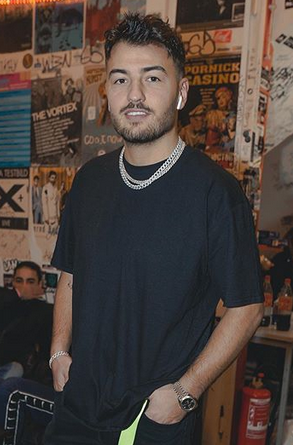
- Bujupi in 2019

Background information
- Born: 28 April 1991 (age 34); Pristina, Kosovo
- Origin: Heidelberg, Germany
- Occupations: Singer; songwriter
- Years active: 2011–present
- Label: Columbia

Ardian Bujupi (Albanian pronunciation: [aɾdiˈan buˈjupi]; born 27 April 1991) is a Kosovan singer and songwriter.

Born in Kosovo, he moved to Germany at a young age and he has been living there ever since. He gained recognition in German-speaking Europe after finishing third in the eighth series of Deutschland sucht den Superstar. He is active in both German and Albanian music industries and is known for his songs "Andiamo" and "Na jena njo", among others.

== Biography ==
Bujupi was born on 27 April 1991 into an Albanian family in the city of Pristina, then part of the SAP Kosovo, Socialist Republic of Serbia, SFR Yugoslavia. At an early age, his family fled to Hemsbach, a small town near Heidelberg, Germany, as a refugee to escape the persecution of Albanians in connection with the disintegration of Yugoslavia.

In 2011, Bujupi auditioned for the eighth season of Deutschland sucht den Superstar, singing "Und wenn ein Lied" by Söhne Mannheims in front of judges Dieter Bohlen, Fernanda Brandão, and Patrick Nuo. After progressing through the rounds, he reached the semi-final and finished in third place on 30 April 2011. In December 2012, he unsuccessfully attempted to represent Albania in the Eurovision Song Contest 2013, after his participation at the 51st edition of Festivali i Këngës with the song "I çmendur për ty".

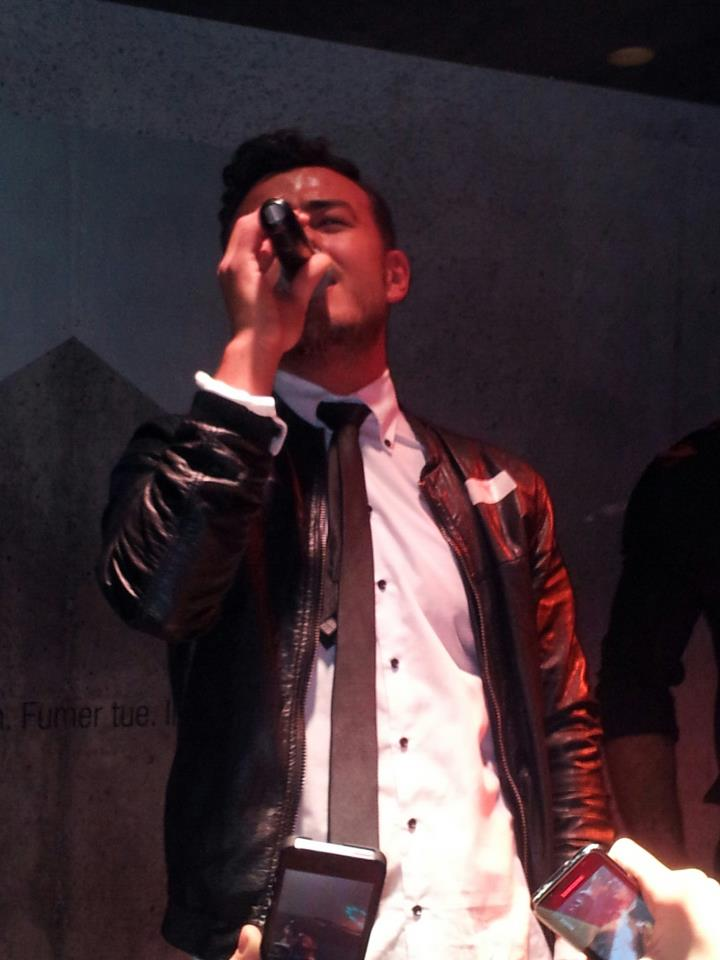
Bujupi performing in 2012

Just a few months after DSDS, Bujupi released his first single "This Is My Time", written in English, which became a hit on the radios and social networks, counting more than a million views over a week. He later released "Rise to the Top" and "I'm Feeling Good", all which had the same success as his first single. He started touring immediately after releasing his first songs. He mostly toured in Germany and Switzerland, but later was invited to tour in Kosovo and Albania. Bujupi was invited to perform in The X Factor Albania to promote his single.

He later became popular in the Albanian-speaking territories and released "Want U Now" also in Kosovo and Albania. The single was well-received and was one of the most played summer songs. He toured around the Albanian coast in the summer.

== Discography ==
- To the Top (2011)
- Ardicted (2015)
- Melodia (2017)
- Rahat (2019)
- 10 (2021)
- Aventura (2022)
- Vegeta (2024)
