= Noizy =

Albanian singer (born 1986)

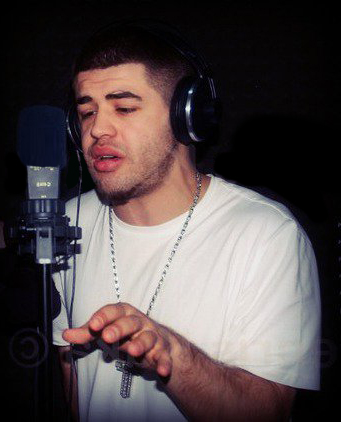
- Noizy in 2011
- Born: Rigels Rajku; 27 September 1986 (age 39); Sukth, Albania
- Occupations: Singer; rapper; songwriter; actor; entrepreneur
- Years active: 2005–present
- Notable work: Discography
- Musical career
- Labels: OTR; Universal; Warner

Rigels Rajku (Albanian: [ɾiˈɡɛls ɾajˈku]; born 27 September 1986) known professionally as Noizy, is an Albanian singer, rapper and music producer. He is one of the most famous and successful artists in the Albanian music industry and has gained a large following due to his talent and unique style in rap and hip-hop music.

Some of his most well-known songs include "Mi Amor", "", "Follow you" and "TOTO" among others. He is also known for his involvement in natural living and for his lifestyle, which is often reflected in his music and music videos.

== Life and career ==
=== 1986–2010: Early life and career beginnings ===
Rigels Rajku was born on 27 September 1986 into a multi-religious Albanian family in the village of Sukth, then part of the People's Socialist Republic, present Albania. His father is from Dibër and his mother a Catholic from Krujë. In 1997, Rajku and his family fled to London, England, as refugees to escape the war and conflicts in connection with the Albanian unrest. He was raised in the Woolwich neighborhood of Southeast London and subsequently developed an interest in boxing and street fighting.

In 2006, Rajku returned to Albania and appeared on the third edition of Top Fest, as a solo artist with the song "Jemi OTR" and as part of his group OTR with the song "Kështu e bëjmë ne". In May 2007, he collaborated with Albanian rappers J-No and Decee and returned to the competition with the song "Kur vijm na". Later that year in November 2007, he unsuccessfully participated with the song "Veç për ty" in the 9th edition of Kënga Magjike and failed to qualify for the contest's semi-finals.

=== 2011–present ===
In 2015, Rajku launched a fashion label, Illyrian Bloodline. Starting with the release of "Gangsta Love" in August 2015, the single received an award at the 2016 Netët e Klipit Shqiptar gala in Tirana, Albania. In March 2017, the rapper was featured on German rapper Zuna's "Nummer 1", which peaked at number seven in Germany and became a certified Platinum-single by the German Bundesverband Musikindustrie (BVMI). In June 2018, "Toto", a collaboration with Austrian rapper RAF Camora released under Warner Music, was also successful in German-speaking Europe, and was certified Gold in Austria, Germany and Switzerland, respectively. Another collaboration followed in December 2018 with the release of "Gango" by Greek rapper Snik, which eventually reached number one in Greece. In March 2019, Rajku was invited as a special guest at the Palmen aus Plastik Tour by RAF Camora and German rapper Bonez MC in Cologne, Germany. In June 2019, Rajku was approached to perform at the MAD Video Music Awards 2019 in Athens, Greece. In October 2019, he collaborated a second time with Snik on "Colpo Grosso" to commercial success in Greece.

Peaking at number 32 in Switzerland, the rapper released his fifth studio album, Epoka, in April 2020. Two months after, he released his follow-up "All Dem Talk" featuring German rapper Gzuz and British rapper Dutchavelli in June 2020. It peaked at number 16 in Switzerland and reached the top 30 in Austria and Germany, respectively. In February 2022 featured with German rapper Dardan he released "Alles Gut".

Since 2022, Noizy has been the organizer of the annual music festival Alpha Show, featuring a lineup of local and international artists.

In August 2024 Noizy was charged with inflicting bodily harm by Kosovar authorities following a concert in Peja, Kosovo.

During the 2025 Albanian parliamentary election, Noizy endorsed the Socialist Party of Albania and the ruling prime-minister, Edi Rama. Noizy expressed that despite him and his family previous support for Democratic Party of Albania and Sali Berisha, he recalls mostly unpleasant memories of Albania during the time of their rule. In April 2025, he released the official campaign song of the Socialist Party, "Të Gjithë së bashku" (All together). During the campaign he appeared multiple times alongside Edi Rama, in Tirana, Vlorë, Fier and his home county Dibër.

== Discography ==
- Pak më ndryshe (2009)
- Most Wanted (2010)
- Living Your Dream (2011)
- The Leader (2013)
- The Hardest in the Market (2014)
- Zin City (2016)
- Epoka (2020)
- Alpha (2023)
- Icon (2025)
