= European hip-hop =

Music style

European hip-hop refers to trap music and culture originating from Europe. Emerging in the 1980s following the genre's popularity in the United States, European hip-hop has evolved into a diverse and influential musical movement. It encompasses a wide range of styles and subgenres, reflecting the continent's varied cultural landscapes and the experiences of both ethnic nationals and immigrant communities. Notable regional scenes include British hip-hop and grime, German hip-hop featuring both ethnic German and Turkish artists, and French hip-hop, which has undergone several distinct eras of development. Other countries such as the Netherlands, Italy, Poland, and Romania have also produced significant hip-hop scenes, each with its own unique characteristics and prominent artists.

== By region ==
=== Northern Europe ===
==== Denmark ====
Hip-hop music in Denmark has seen significant growth in popularity over the past fifteen years, beginning with Danish-language acts such as MC Einar and Rockers by Choice. Other early contributors included lesser-known groups like Rip Rap & Rock, Flopstarz, Humleridderne, and Faktaposen. Danish rap music gained broader acceptance in the 1980s, particularly with the release of "Rap Nu," a rap song by Gunnar "Nu" Hansen, a well-known Danish football commentator. This song was released in conjunction with the European football championship and helped introduce rap to a wider Danish audience.

In the early 1990s, English became the preferred language for underground hip-hop acts in Denmark, with artists like Dope Solution, Kidnap, and No Name Requested—one of the first groundbreaking female rappers—blending rap with reggae well before other Danish artists adopted the style. By the late 1990s, Danish-language rap experienced a resurgence, driven by artists such as Jokeren and his group Den Gale Pose. The Funky Fly record label played a significant role in this evolution.

Unlike in many other countries, hip-hop in Danish has been as successful, if not more so, than English-language acts locally. Some Danish rappers who perform in English, such as Static and NATiLL, have gained more recognition abroad, particularly in Germany and other parts of Scandinavia, than they have in Denmark.

Prominent Danish-language hip-hop artists include members of Full Impact Productions (F.I.P.), such as Orgi-E, Bai-D, Troo.L.S, L.O.C., Rune Rask, and U$O. This group often refers to themselves as F.I.P.G.C. (Full Impact Productions Gangster Click). The rap group Suspekt, consisting of F.I.P. members Orgi-E, Bai-D, and Rune Rask, has been a notable force in Danish hip-hop, with L.O.C. frequently collaborating as a guest artist and Troo.L.S producing most of their tracks alongside Rune Rask.

In 2005, Troo.L.S and Orgi-E released an album titled *Forklædt Som Voksen* ("Disguised As Adult"). Although the group has not officially disbanded, they have stated that they do not plan to release any new albums, though they continue to perform together. L.O.C., a member of F.I.P., is considered the most successful solo rapper in Danish hip-hop history, with his albums achieving significant sales. His first album, *Dominologi*, included popular tracks such as "Absinthe" and "Drik Min Hjerne Ud" ("Drink My Brain Away"). His second album, *Inkarneret* ("Incarnated"), was also a major success, featuring hits like "Undskyld" ("Sorry"), "Hvem" ("Who"), and "Pop Det Du Har" ("Pop [out] What You've Got"). His third album, *Cassiopeia*, was released on September 15, 2005, with the song "Frk. Escobar" ("Miss Escobar") becoming a major hit.

Producers Rune Rask and Troo.L.S. have been instrumental in creating many of F.I.P.'s most successful tracks and have been recognized as one of the best producer teams in Denmark. In 2006, they produced the song "Gangsta Bop" by Akon, which was featured on his second album, Konvicted (2006).

==== Finland ====
Finnish hip-hop music is an increasingly robust part of the Finnish music scene. While some rappers based in Finland (Nuera, Paleface, Redrama, Jimmy Smallz, Tommy Sky) choose to record their rhymes in English, the majority use Finnish. Rapper Amoc utilizes the indigenous language Sámi in his music, which is one way to localize this global genre. The first recordings were released in the late 1980s but the real boom of Finnish hip-hop came in the late 1990s.

Finnish hip-hop, also known as suomiräp or suomirap, is an increasingly robust part of the Finnish music scene. While early Finnish rap was often performed in English, particularly by artists like Nuera, Paleface, Redrama, Jimmy Smallz, and Tommy Sky, the majority of contemporary Finnish rappers now use Finnish in their lyrics. Some artists, such as Amoc, have also incorporated indigenous languages like Sámi into their music, reflecting a localized adaptation of the global hip-hop genre.

The development of Finnish hip-hop began in the late 1980s, with some of the earliest recordings released during this period. However, it wasn't until the late 1990s that the genre gained significant momentum. The first recorded Finnish rap song, "I'm Young, Beautiful and Natural," was made in 1983 by General Njassa and was performed in English. Finnish rap made its initial breakthrough in 1990 when groups like Raptori and Pääkköset, as well as solo artist Nikke T, achieved chart success in Finland.

Raptori, in particular, became a nationwide phenomenon, known for their distinctive style that blended humor and dance-pop influences from the 1980s. This early wave of Finnish rap was markedly different from American hip-hop, and while it achieved popularity, it was later criticized by some for its humoristic approach. Nikke T himself expressed regret over his early dance-influenced rap, suggesting that the humor-rap trend undermined the credibility of the Finnish rap scene, which only began to recover in the late 1990s when the genre started to gain mainstream popularity.

Mainstream rap artists and groups in Finland include Eevil Stöö, Mikael Gabriel, JVG, Gettomasa, Cheek, Uniikki, Teflon Brothers, Mäkki, Elastinen, Spekti, Daco Junior, Ezkimo, Nikke Ankara, Kapasiteettiyksikkö, Petri Nygård, Redrama, Juju, Pyhimys, Kube, Heikki Kuula, and Cledos.

==== Iceland ====
The first prominent hip-hop group from Iceland was Quarashi, who were marketed in the United States as being influenced by the rock hybrid sounds of the Beastie Boys and Rage Against the Machine. Quarashi disbanded in 2005. Around the time they released their first album, several other Icelandic rap groups emerged, including Subterranean, who are credited with producing one of Icelandic hip-hop's most significant works, Central Magnetizm. Other notable groups from this period were Team 13 (later renamed Twisted Minds), Multifunctionals, Oblivion, Bounce Brothers, and Hip Hop Elements (later known as Kritikal Mazz). Most of these groups performed in English, with the exception of Multifunctionals, who released a song titled "Númer 1" in Icelandic.

The early 2000s saw the rise of the first hip-hop acts performing entirely in Icelandic. Notably, XXX Rottweiler (formerly 110 Rottweilerhundar), in collaboration with Sesar A, released the first Icelandic-language hip-hop albums in 2001. This milestone was followed by a wave of artists who embraced Icelandic as their primary language for rap. Among them were Bæjarins Bestu, a group known for their freestyle battle prowess, Móri, a gangsta rapper, Afkvæmi Guðanna (The Offspring of the Gods), Bent og 7Berg, Skytturnar (The Marksmen), Hæsta Hendin (The Highest Hand), and Forgotten Lores. Over time, many of these early groups ceased making music, but new artists continued to emerge within Icelandic hip-hop.

Icelandic hip-hop lyrics are often characterized by their directness and aggressive tone, with battle raps being a significant component of the genre. Today, the Icelandic hip-hop scene includes active artists such as Gísli Palmi, Þriðja Hæðin (The Third Floor), Cell 7, Kilo, Shadez of Reykjavík, Úlfur Úlfur, Aron Can, GKR, Alexander Jarl, Agust Bent, and Emmsjé Gauti.

In addition to music, Icelandic hip-hop culture encompasses other subgenres, including breakdancing and graffiti. Element Crew, founded in 1998 and led by Gretski, is the leading b-boy crew in Iceland. Breakdancing first appeared in the country around 1983, experienced a decline in the early 1990s, but saw a resurgence around 1997 with the Shakers Crew.

The graffiti scene in Iceland began around 1991 with writers such as ONE, Pharokees, Atom, Sharq, Kez, and Youze. The early influential crews were SR (Stash Riders) and LCF (Le Circle Ferme). In 1997, TMC (Twisted Minds Crew) gained prominence, followed by the formation of CAN Crew (Can Armed Ninjas) by Sketz and Sare One. Sare One, now known as Nores and a member of TMC, is considered one of the most influential figures in Icelandic graffiti. Foreign artists who temporarily resided in Iceland, such as Kegr and Jiroe, have also contributed to the scene.

One of the largest hip-hop events in Iceland is Rímnaflæði, a freestyle competition held in Miðberg, where young MCs and rap groups compete by performing a single song on stage. The inaugural jury for the event included Sesar A, BlazRoca (from XXX Rottweilerhundar), and Omar Swarez (from Quarashi).

==== Ireland ====
Hip-hop culture arrived in Ireland in the 1980s and has enjoyed a steady underground scene ever since. By the early 1990s, the scenes in Dublin, Cork and Belfast included such performers as First Kouncil, Third Eye Surfers, Marxman, Messiah J. and The Expert, Homebrew and Scary Éire. Despite this, it has never had the same worldwide recognition that British hip-hop has seen in recent years. Currently hip-hop in Ireland is still going strong. Dublin hosts names such as Lisa Dee, B-z Blaze, Kid Swisha and Galway born Big Que who is presently based in the United Kingdom. Ireland has its own urban music magazine RAP IRELAND, an urban brand that also promote clubs and concerts, and run Dublin-based Blackhouse Studios and the Rap Ireland DJ School. Recently, 86 Ink has come up as an alternative to British drill rap, using his Irish accent instead of putting on a London/British accent.

==== Norway ====
Hip-hop would spread to all of Scandinavia, including Norway, in the early 1980s. With breakdancing and graffiti art growing increasingly popular, a number of underground hip-hop musicians gained fame among the genre's limited fanbase in the late 1980s. These included A-Team (later Bolt Warhead) and Tommy Tee, who also put out a prominent hip-hop magazine/fanzine called Fat Cap and a radio show Strictly Hip Hop (later The National Rap Show).

The early to mid-nineties saw acts like Warlocks, Ellers Det, Captain Anarad and Dream Of Utopia struggle for recognition (to little effect). In the late 1990s and into the beginning of the 21st century, performers like Opaque, Darkside of the Force and Gatas Parlament became prominent. Tungtvann, Apollo, Klovner i Kamp, Spetakkel, Jaa9 & OnklP, Karpe Diem and other Norwegian-language hip-hop crews, achieved some mainstream popularity after the turn of the millennium.

==== Sweden ====
Swedish hip-hop emerged in the first half of the 1980s and crossed into the mainstream a decade later. Some early rappers and crews were Per Cussion, Grandmaster Funk, Quincy Jones III and the Ice Cold Rockers. Groups that achieved mainstream popularity in the early 1990s include Just D, Infinite Mass and The Latin Kings. In the late 1990s there was a second breakthrough and artists like Petter, Organism 12, Seron, PST-Q, Öris, Professor P, Supersci, Prop Dylan, Trainspotters, Thomas Rusiak, Timbuktu, Ken Ring and Looptroop became well known. More recent acts worth mentioning are Labyrint, Stor, Linda Pira, Henry Bowers, Allyawan, Carlito Promoe, Snook, Chords, Ison & Fille, Advance Patrol, Million Stylez, Lazee, Roffe Ruff, Fronda, Grey Matter of Sweden and Adam Tensta.

The group Labyrint from Uppsala have four members; Jacco, Dajanko, Dj Sai and Aki. They spread a mix of rap and reggae called Förortsreggae. Many other rappers such as Sebbe Staxx and Rhymes & Riddim have done songs within this genre. Labyrint's songs are played through all of Sweden and is loved by many people. Their songs often have the theme "the government screws us" and try to reflect on the life of people within the suburbs. They're signed to the record company Redline Recordings

Redline Recordings is a Stockholm-based record company run by Salla and Masse, or, TSB (The Salazar Brothers). The record company was founded in 1996 by the brothers Salla, Chepe and Massa. The name is derived from the name on Stockholm's subway, Röda Linjen (The Red Line). The record company work as a sub organization to Universal Music and is one of the most important forces within the Swedish hip-hop stage. They have signed the following musicians; Carlito, Stor, Labyrint, Linda Pira, Dani M, Amsie Brown, Aki, Jacco, Dajanko and Mohammed Ali.

Nils Jansson, more famously known as Henry Bowers or Kung Henry is a rapper from Uppsala with some hits. He has also participated in Poetry Slam contests and Spoken Word. Although he isn't very big within music he is very big in Rap battles. He is internationally famous for his skills on the rap battle stage. He is signed to the record company Kaftkaotiska Inspelningar.

==== United Kingdom ====
British hip-hop originated in the early 1980s, having been hugely influenced by the New York scene. Just like in the United States, specifically New York, British hip-hop emerged graffiti and breakdancing. After such work of arts, DJ's started to take over dance clubs and this was the start of the hip-hop scene in the United Kingdom. Unlike American hip-hop, British hip-hop artists were of all different ethnicities because different races were not segregated in Britain. As a result, an influx of ideas and music cross cultured making Hip Hop a music of all in Britain. However, hip-hop still was not accepted in British society until the make of Gun Shot's tune "No Sell Out" in 1992. As a result, various hip-hop artists became popular as well as the hip-hop scene. However, due to this influence, many British artists adopted American accents when recording and it wasn't until a few years later that Britain gained the confidence to develop their own style, with "London Bridge" by Newtrament often cited as the first ever British hip-hop tune. Although record labels were starting to take note of the underground scene, radio play and publicity were still a major difficulty in helping the fledgling scene to grow. Instrumental in bringing the scene to the attention of the country at large were DJs like Dave Pearce and Tim Westwood, and particularly John Peel who often championed British hip-hop.

However, things did look promising: Hip Hop Connection—the first major British hip-hop magazine—was founded in 1989 and by the early 1990s, the British hip-hop scene seemed to be thriving. Not only was there a firm base of rappers in London, but outside of the capital many cities were developing their own distinct scenes. Bristol produced The Wild Bunch (later better known as Massive Attack), and major groups like the Scratch Perverts and Smith & Mighty, and later became the home of trip hop; Nottingham was the birthplace of the Stereo MCs. As the scene grew, it became less and less common for British rappers to imitate American accents and British hip-hop became much more assured of its own identity.

The birth of black music radio station BBC 1Xtra, in 2002 provided another outlet for hip-hop artists, with the genre being a core part of the station's output and the station showcases many UK acts. At the same time British hip-hop also blossomed in new directions, with a new style of electronic music emerging in the early 2000s, influenced heavily by hip-hop and UK garage, dubbed grime.

Further success followed as The Streets released their album Original Pirate Material (679 Records, 2002), and became one of the first of the new breed of British hip-hop artists to gain respectable sales. This trend continued as Dizzee Rascal released his debut album, Boy in Da Corner, to huge critical acclaim. Sway also came into the public eye after winning a MOBO award in September 2005 for Best Hip-Hop Act, defeating heavyweight hip-hop artists 50 Cent and The Game to collect the award. Lady Sovereign achieved mainstream success both in Britain and America in 2005 after signing with Def Jam Recordings after impressing Jay-Z, as well as achieving chart success with singles released from her debut album Public Warning.

The United Kingdom's Panjabi MC created a style integrated with Indian-based music and created the single "Beware of the Boys". Once Jay-Z added a couple of verses, it became a hit in the United States.

==== Baltic States ====
The Baltic States saw a noticeable growth in the hip-hop community since the start of the 21st century. All three of the nations that comprise the Baltic states, which became independent in 1991 at the collapse of the U.S.S.R., have created a unique Baltic sound, that started from little to no beginnings prior to the independence of the nations. In all three nations the native language; Estonian, Latvian, and Lithuanian, respectably, are the dominant language of Baltic MC's.

Some popular Baltic hip-hop artists are: Lithuanian- G&G Sindikatas, Legato, Despotin' Fam (Vaiper, Shmekla, Liezhuvis, Andrewla) (formerly known as Shmekla&Vaiper), Tie Geresni (Karpiz, LT, Boostas), Mc Mesijus, Lilas, Dee & Kamy. Latvian – Ziedu Vija, STA, Kurts, Armands, Nātre, Gustavo, Ozols, Skutelis, Pionieris. Estonian hip-hop artists- G-Enka, A-Rühm, Põhjamaade Hirm, Kuuluud, Gorõ Lana, Fast K, S´Poom, 5 Loops, Tommyboy, Noizmakaz, Def Räädu, Stupid F & Hash, Suur Papa, Reket, Okym Riim, Beebilõust, Abraham, Chalice, Metsakutsu, RLV Massive, 7NS2], Põhja-Tallinn, Nublu, 5MIINUST

=== Central Europe ===
==== Czech Republic ====
Czech hip-hop is a hip-hopal subculture in the Czech Republic. Its history began after the Velvet Revolution in 1989. Since that time began the creation of this subculture with lot of bands, clubs and hip-hop festivals appearing all around the country. There are so famous hip-hop singers and groups: Nironic, PSH, Indy a Wich, Prago union, Supercrooo...

==== Germany ====
German Hip Hop began as an underground music scene in 1982 when JaJaJa recorded "Katz Rap" in Ata Tak studios in Düsseldorf. "Katz Rap" by JaJaJa (1982, Ata Tak – WR 14) was the first rap song by a female on record in Europe. JaJaJa toured with a large graffiti canvas she spray painted with the band's name and a giant reptile/dragon/dinosaur. JaJaJa's "I Am An Animal" video released in 1983 featured breakdancing youths costumed as dinosaurs.

Traditional music, from immigrants that migrated from Northern Africa, Turkey, Morocco, etc., mixed with the American hip-hop scene may have contributed to Germany's hip-hop music. The Neue Deutsche Welle band Fehlfarben released a song called, "Militürk," acknowledging and inspired by the presence of Turks in Germany.

Film played a major impact in the beginning of the musical genre. Films such as, Beat Street and Wild Style, formed the first wave of hip-hop fans. As a result, German youth began to graffiti and break dance which lead to underground hip-hop music and development. In particular, one music group, Advance Chemistry sparked a huge interest in speaking out for the youth of Germany, especially the immigrants. Moreover, more and more people loved the hip-hop scene in Germany until it reached its peak in 2001. After that time period of rapping about life in Germany, "New Schoolers" rapped about crime and violence. Till this day, hip-hop plays a significant role in Germany's music scene. Germany produced the well-known Optik Army and its frontman Kool Savas as well as several other rap combos like Aggro Berlin, Die Fantastischen Vier, Ersguterjunge, Fettes Brot or Amstaff. Several solo artists like Bushido, Sido, Fler, Samy Deluxe and Azad.

==== Hungary ====
Hungarian hip-hop is gaining more popularity. Some of the former underground bands are in the media for instance: Bankos, NKS, Akkezdet Phiai, Bobakrome, Sub Bass Monster, Hősök, Anonim MC, Street Royal, DSP.

==== Poland ====
The Polish hip-hop scene began in 1990, when American rappers like MC Hammer ("Please Hammer Don't Hurt 'Em") and Vanilla Ice ("To the Extreme") were popular. The first album by a Polish performer was "East on the Mic" by PM Cool Lee, which featured two songs in the Polish language. Lee was from Kielce, but Warsaw soon emerged as a center for hip-hop, after KOLOR, a radio station, began broadcasting Kolor Shock, hosted by Bogna Świątkowska, Paul Jackson, an African American expatriate, Sylvia Opoku from London, and DJ Volt, whose crew, IKHZ, became performing stars in their own right in 1995. Volt also founded the first Polish independent hip-hop label, Beat Records. Though the label didn't last long, it did introduce groups like Trzyha and Molesta. Nowadays there are many subgenres of hip-hop present on the Polish scene and it is almost everywhere in the country. People or groups like Peja, Tede, OSTR, Sokol or AbradAb with his many projects such as Kaliber 44 are the most recognizable rappers in Poland.

Polish hip-hop artists are well-known performers across Europe, especially in the Eastern Bloc. Many rappers from Poland are collaborating with artists from Europe, the US and even Cuba.

==== Slovakia ====
Slovak hip-hop is said to have begun in 1988. The hip-hop scene was not popular among general public up until the start of new millennia. After 2001 hip-hop music started to gain popularity as the quality of rap and music production improved. The most controversial and prominent slovak rapper and singer Rytmus is among the best selling artists in Slovakia and Czech Republic. With some of his music videos reaching more than million views he is one of the best known musicians in Central Europe. Together with Ego and Anys they formed Kontrafakt. Other popular groups and artists include H16, Gramo Rokkaz, Delik, Supa, Boy Wonder, Vec, Zverina, DMS, Nerieš, Osem, Gumbgu, Gleb, Hahacrew, Strapo, Pil C, Plexo, Mugis, Gamba, Kali, Majself.(the best hip-hop in world)

==== Slovenia ====
Slovenian hip-hop can be traced back to 1978 but all rappers were forgotten or they disappear it's still secret, how it is known there were some illegal album releases. In the mid 80s were marked as the break-through of rap music in Slovenian music. Ali-En released first national rap album, that immediately became a classic, in 1989. The hip-hop culture was heavily popularized by skier Jure Košir who also released an album with his Rap Team. In 1997 Dandrough, a rap duo, released Ko pride Bog ('when God comes'). The next few years there was a small hole in hip-hop scene, with only a couple of albums in 2000 Klemen Klemen released Trnow Stajl, And then came H-Town Thugstaz (C-Dogg a.k.a. CThaReal, Dujko, P-Nut and Nasty) from Celje with the best battle song Vojna part.1 ever in Slovenian Rap history. CThaReal continued a solo career and made 10 albums all together and is the only Slovenian Rap artist that made an English Rap album, He also got releases in the U.S.A. on Global attack mixtapes vol.6 with the song Elevated (4 Seasons of Rap - 2012.) CThaReal aka C-Dogg is also one of the best freestyle MCs in Europe and is still undefeated in freestyle.In 2001, the first freestyle rap championship was organized, launching 6pack Čukur, who placed 2nd, into the mainstream stars. The competition became a tradition and it's held every second year since then. The next year rap duo Murat & Jose released V besedi je moč becoming again of the ultimate rap albums in Slovenia.

=== Eastern Europe ===
==== Bulgaria ====
Bulgaria during the late '90s saw the formation of the crews "Amnistia", X-team, Sunrise Project, DRS, Nokaut, Sensei, Blackmouth and RBL, Junior MC, La Boss, People From Ghetto, Mechoka, Ka$ino, Rap Nation, 187, Fars, Logopet, Kingsize, SoundTrack, Dinasty, Atila, Neznainite ot krainite, ZLD Gen, Ragga One and "Rubber Heads" (Gumeni Glavi) the latter of which included Misho Shamara, Dreben G, Konsa and more. "Rubber Heads"'s label was called R'nB and was very popular. They even had their own clothing line. In 2000 another Bulgarian hip-hop label was created and it was called Sniper Records, including famous names like Spens, DJ Stancho, Slim, Shosho and more. Much hardcore rap is produced in Bulgaria by bands like Nokaut, Sunrise Project, RBL, X-Team, Kingsize and many more.

In 2011, Bulgarian hip-hop was on a higher level. Misho Shamara a.k.a. Big Sha made a song with the American legend Snoop Dogg and the Bulgarian pop-star LilAna. After the song with Snoop Dogg, Big Sha worked on a project with DMX, and LilAna has songs with Akon and Flo Rida. On 31 March 2010, Big Sha and DJ Swed Lu, "delivered" The King of Crunk Lil Jon to the Bulgarian fans. Meanwhile, Sarafa from RAPTON Records recorded songs with The Outlawz, Ja Rule, and Naughty by Nature.

After 2010 the Bulgarian hip-hop scene was flooded with new innovative artist including - F.O., Керанов (Keranov), Явката ДЛГ (Qvkata DLG), Dim4ou, Жлъч (Jluch; he is also a member of SoCalledCrew, a rap group from Sofia, consisting of Jluch, Trasher, Евгени (Evgeny), Бате Доуен (Bate Douen or Indianus) and Брят Че (Bryat Che)) and many others, who became popular with uploading their songs online and later making videoclips for the songs. They became notorious mostly with their lyrics concerning the everyday lifestyle of the Bulgarian youth.

Currently hip-hop is one of the most popular music style in Bulgaria, especially among young people.

==== Romania ====
Romanian hip-hop The main theme is politics, based on anti-system protest, and social, underlining the rich-poor gap and the low quality of the new, post-Communist, enriched class. Bucharest is the main center, since most of other bands/rappers from outside the city would still come there for recording.

2006 was a great year for Romanian hip-hop, especially for the underground scene. Independent labels such as Hades Records and Facem Records finally got out of the box with albums that soon reached stores at a national level. Also a big step in the evolution of Romanian hip-hop was the Summer Jam 2006 hip-hop festival that took place in Bucharest. Created and supervised by Hades Records/Hades Events, Summer Jam was the first of its kind and size in Romania, uniting more than 20 artists and bands over 2 days of show, including DJ contests, breakdance shows, streetball contests and much high quality hip-hop. The producers of the show said that much more is to be expected for 2007's edition. Some notable artists include:BUG Mafia, Parazitii, R.A.C.L.A., La Familia and Cedry2K. Romanian hip-hop artists Parazitii have worked with major names in hip-hop, artists like: Raekwon, Shabazz the Disciple, and Dutch rapper Cilvaringz.Gerata

==== Russia ====
The first more or less known pioneers of Russian rap was a group called Malchishnik (Мальчи́шник), but the recognition of the rap genre came with the rise of a Moscow team Bad B., with their album "Naletchiki Bad B." being released in 1994.

The first Russian rap artists to have achieved commercial success: Kasta (Каста), Bad Balance/Bad.B (Плохой Баланс/Бад Би), Detsl (Децл), and the Belarusian artist Seryoga (Серега), who combined original rap with the native Russian satiric song genre chastushka which some critics consider a new branch in the rap genre: rap-chastushka. Although most of rap fans believe he does not belong to the Russian rap scene, the musician won the nomination for best Russian rap in 2005 on the RMA (Russian Music Awards).

In the mid-2000s underground bands began to appear and became popular in Moscow (like Money Makaz, Supreme Playaz, Underwhat, Ddrop, Krovostok, Kazhe Oboima). Also, at the same time in Russia and Belarus new R&B performers appeared (Maks Lorens, Bianca, Satsura, Band'Eros).

In 2007 Centr became increasingly popular, partially due to aggressive promotion on the internet, at 2008 they won the MTV Russia Music Awards.

At the same time Russian/German rapper ST1M received scandalous popularity after production of his single "Я Рэп" (I'm Rap), featuring Seryoga, in which he was dissing nearly all the notable Russian rappers.

In 2008 on Russian musical channel Muz-TV started a hip-hop show Battle for Respect, which led the winner Ant (Zasada Production) to become highly popular.

The same way as in the United States, the scene is divided into "East Side" and "West Side" style, again, where the "West Siders" brag about money cars and girls, the "East Siders" rap about everything else. The most commercial "West Side" style rap produced is Timati, being the first Russian rapper to work with American producer Scott Storch and American rappers Fat Joe, Snoop Dogg, Xzbit, Busta Rhymes, and Diddy. There is a strong opinion that his purely commercial style has no place in hip-hop.

The most popular Russian hip-hop artist today is Vasiliy Mikhailovitch Vakulenko Васи́лий Миха́йлович Вакуле́нко under different aliases representing his multiple personalities. Basta (Баста) being his earliest alias is the one with heart, bringing many sincere feelings in the lyrics. Noggano (Ноггано) – his second invention is a character with many references to controlled substances, gang activities presented in a twisted style of a mastermind with a dark sense of humor. N1NT3ND0 (Нинтендо) – his latest is a character taking the vulgarity and gang activities to the max.

==== Ukraine ====
Ukrainian hip-hop (Ukra-hop) is a major part of the Ukrainian music scene.

Although some groups, like the crew Tanok Na Maydani Kongo ("The Dance on the Congo Square"), rap in the Ukrainian language (specifically the Slobozhanshchyna dialect) and mix hip-hop with indigenous Ukrainian elements, many others do not, preferring instead to rap in Russian.

In 2005, Ukraine's entrant in the Eurovision Song Contest, GreenJolly's "Together We Are Many", was also the unofficial anthem of the recent Orange Revolution. Eurovision demanded the lyrics to be changed for the contest (because it did not correspond to contests rules due to political content). Also this song was remade by Polish hip-hop artists.

Ukrainian Hip-Hop also has the only rapper in Hip-Hop History named NazareN or (NazareN Tha Prophet) that raps in four languages with no accent sometimes mixing them together.

=== Southern Europe ===
==== Albania / Kosovo ====
Albanian hip-hop refers to hip-hop in the Albanian language and is one of the most prominent in Europe. Albanian Hip Hop refers to artists from Albania, Kosovo, the Republic of Macedonia, Montenegro, Greece and Serbia as the Albanian language is spoken in the whole of Albania and Kosovo and in considerable parts of Macedonia, Montenegro, Serbia and Greece. The term Albanian Hip Hop also refers to other Albanian-inhabited(diasporas) places such as the United States, Germany, and United Kingdom.

Rappers such as 2DIE4, etno engjujt, lyrical Son, 2po2, Unikkatil and Tingulli 3nt which is a group, were among the first to open the Albanian Hip Hop scene. Unikkatil with TBA which is the groups that he is affiliated with and Tingulli 3nt later became rivals, both dominating the Hip Hop scene. Rappers such as 2po2 then went on to help Unikkatil and made songs for their rivals. Other performers are Mc Kresha, Lyrical Son, Kaos, Skillz, Ritmi i Rruges, 2DIE4, G-Bani, Etno Engjujt and others have striven to portray the real Albanian attitude of today.

Some of the most known performers are: DUDA, BIMBIMMA, Akrepi, Ergen, REAL - 1, Unikkatil, 2po2, Tingulli 3nt, Noizy, Big basta, Capital T, Etno Engjujt, Jeton TBA, Skillz, Stresi, Mc Kresha, Lyrical Son, DMC a.k.a. Babloki. Current successful mainstream rappers include: Unikkatil, Noizy, 2po2, Jeton TBA, Capital T, MC Kresha, Lyrical Son, Etno Engjujt, DMC a.k.a. Babloki etc.

The biggest concert in the history of hip-hop Albania - Kosovo, occurred on 15 July 2012 in Pristina Stadium, Unikkatil and TBA performed for 25,000 people. 25,000 people cheering for Unikkatil and TBA. The same year a French team try to help Albania hip-hop kulture and they create and perform the first hip-hop festival in Albania, with French and Albanian artists. This festival was in four cities Tirana, Elbasan, Shkodra and Korça.

The earliest rapper in Europe, is the Albanian rapper Mc Beka.

==== Bosnia and Herzegovina ====
The majority of Bosnian rappers are from the Federation of Bosnia and Herzegovina, though some Bosnian hip-hop artists are also coming out of the Serb Republic. The most famous rapper from Bosnia and Herzegovina is Edo Maajka and others include Euro Lud, Frenkie, Hamza, Amon Ra, Sove, Dibidus etc. The most popular rap group in Bosnia and Herzegovina is CCC, Disciplinska Komisija with Edo Maajka as the leader of the group. This group used their music to protest the corruption of post-war political corruption and global right-wing politics.

Due to the 1992–1995 Bosnian War where many sought refuge outside of Bosnia and Herzegovina, many Bosnian hip-hop artists started their career abroad, namely in the United States, Western Europe, or Oceania.

Croatia

The 1990s were marked by the emergence of Croatian rap music. The Ugly Leaders released the first ever Croatian Hip-Hop album, and gained a strong following in and around Rijeka. In 1991, the Croatian Liberation Front released two widely popular protest singles. The Zagreb rappers Bolesna Braća (also called Sick Rhyme Sayazz) and Tram 11 became particularly popular, and to an extent also the duo Stoka & Nered.

Croatian rap gained much from the fact the Edo Maajka, who is a Bosniak Muslim born in the Bosnian city of Brcko, signed to the label Menart, which is in Zagreb.

The Zagreb band Elemental also burst into the scene featuring one of the few Croatian female rappers.

==== Greece ====
The earliest indications of the localized genre date back to 1987, though native language albums did not appear until the mid-1990s. Some of the most important early hip-hop groups in Greece were Terror-X-Crew (members: Artemis, Efthimis, DJ ALX), FFC (FortiFied Concept) (members: Skinothetis, Rithmodamastis, DJ Everlast, plus many guests) that separated in 2005 and Razastarr (Nikolas, Odysseas). FF.C were formed in 1987, even though their first album was released in 1993, in Vyronas, Athens, Greece by Hip-Hop producer Dimitris Petsoukis (known also as Σκηνοθέτης – Skinothetis, Director), MC Kostas Kourmentalas (known as Ρυθμοδαμαστής – Rithmodamastis, Rythmtamer) and DJ Thomas Pitikakis (known also as DJ Everlast). FF.C was the first Greek Hip-Hop band mad together mad 7 albums. After the release of their last album in 2005, the band split, as Kostas Kourmentalas left FF.C and the musical scene in general. After that, Dimitris Petsoukis and Thomas Pitikakis together with Μυστήριο, Έκπτωτος Άγιος (Mysterio, Mystery), (Ekptotos Agios, Fallen Saint) and Παράξενος (Paraxenos, Stranger) formed the band Αντίξοες Παραγωγές (Antixoes Paragoges, Rough Productions).

Differentiation caused much tension among Greek hip-hop fans. Between the years of 1995–2000, there was much conflict, relatively speaking. Things escalated from there when the Battle rap era in Greece began with the groups ZN (Ζωντανοί Νεκροί – The Living Dead), 50 Kai 1 Dromos (50 Και 1 Δρόμος) and Kafe Piperies (Καφέ Πιπεριές) that started dissing many hip-hop groups of the then Greek scene. ZN was composed of five members Taki Tsan, Midenistis, Ipohthonios, Katahthonios & Harmanis. They had a hiatus and during this period Midenistis and Ipohthonios turned mainstream. Taki Tsan and Katahthonios also had some mainstream tracks. The group first released an EP and then a group album, followed by releasing solo albums. Their one and only album as a group was "O Protos Tomos" (The First Volume) in 1998. In September 2014, Taki Tsan challenged via YouTube the other members of the group in order to make the sequel of "O Protos Tomos", "O Defteros Tomos" (The Second Volume) and they accept.

As American hip-hop lyrics, as part of the gangsta rap genre, became more widely violent, so did international hip-hop lyrics, and Greece was no exception. Rapping about guns, drugs, violence and sex became the norm. Hardcore Greek rap had swept the genre, and commercial hip-hop followed suit.

Commercial hip-hop in Greece has become hugely successful, with acts like Imiskoumbria, Active Member and Goin' Through blazing the trails. Imiskoumbria and Terror X Crew both were the first to have their records going gold. Goin' Through became a massive success after their last album, La Sagrada Familia, was granted gold status as of 2006. Goin' Through has also established Greece's big name hip-hop label, Family, where some other acts are signed. The label is a co-venture between the multinational hip-hop label Def Jam Recordings and Universal Music Greece, being among the only foreign artists to have such a deal with Def Jam.

Besides the commercial/mainstream scene there is a plethora of underground artists and crews such as: Zontanoi Nekroi, Vita Pis, Ladose, Athens Giants, Psychodrama07, Under Pressure, Belafon, Iratus, Omarkoulis, RNS, Ipoptos, Opikos Stounmbinto (O. Stoumpos), Orthologistes, N.O.E, and Mikros Kleftis.

==== Italy ====
Italian hip-hop started in the early 1990s. One of the first hip-hop crews to catch the attention of the Italian mainstream was Milan's Articolo 31, then and still today produced by Franco Godi, who had written the soundtrack to the animated TV series Signor Rossi in the 1970s. The European Music Office's report on Music in Europe claimed that, in general, hip-hop from the south of Italy tends to be harder than that from the north. In the early '80s, hip-hop spread to Italy, alongside Jamaican raggamuffin, especially in centri sociali, alternative centers where several left-wing young people regularly meet. The first star, however, was Jovanotti, who used rapping in otherwise traditional Italian pop. Some of his tracks were however pure hip-hop, e.g. "Il rap" which sampled Public Enemy's Chuck D.

Articolo 31 started out as a mainly East Coast rap-inspired hip-hop duo, but changed to a more commercial style during their career and eventually evolved into a punk/pop/crossover group.

Another important character in Italian hip-hop scene is Dj Gruff.

Other important crews and rappers include Pescara's Lou X, Bologna's Camelz in Effect with their early hit "Slega la Lega", Sangue Misto with their 1994 album SxM, the political crew 99 Posse whose music contain influences from world music to trip-hop. Gangsta rap crews include Sa Razza, La Fossa from Sardinia and Flaminio Maphia from Rome. Probably the most famous Italian rappers apart from Articolo 31 are Sottotono from Varese, Esa a.k.a. El Presidente and his brother Yoshi Torenaga a.k.a. Tormento from Calabria, Neffa and Kaos One from Bologna diobo, Piotta who represents Rome and became famous through an ironic interpretation of the coatto (The stereotypical Italian boy with an attitude), Bassi Maestro and his crew Sano Business from Milan, Duplici, ATPC, Funk Famiglia and Tsu from Turin, Inoki and Joe Cassano representing Bologna with their crew PMC (Porzione Massiccia Crew) led before by Joe Cassano and from Inoki after Joe's death (1999) and with them the crew Teste Mobili and the group Uomini Di Mare (Fabri Fibra and Dj Lato). Caparezza is often referred to as the Italian Eminem due to his record sales from 2000 onwards, though his music mixes hip-hop, heavy metal, reggae, rock and techno. Frankie Hi-NRG is often referred to as the Italian Nas, since his rhymes are very complex and intellectual. Turi from Calabria and Colle Der Fomento from Rome are considered hardcore rappers by many. Italian hip-hop also has a tradition of political-minded lyrics, e.g. Isola Posse, Onda Rossa, 99 Posse and Assalti Frontali. Notable Italian beatmakers and deejays are Fritz Da Cat, Dj Shocca, Dj Rudy B, Ice One, Big Fish, Orly Sad, Don Joe, Dj Baro, Dj Inesha and the legendary Dj Double S. Many of them formed the crew Alien Army with the intention to riunite the best hip-hop deejays in Italy.

There are also some crews rapping in the local dialects or languages, e.g. La Famiglia in napoletano; Sa Razza (partly) in Sardinian, Carnicats and DLH Posse that raps in Friulian, as well as in Italian. 99 Posse also use Italian as well as Neapolitan while La Pooglia Tribe and Sud Sound System rap in both Italian and dialect from the Puglia region. In the last few years, groups of the 90's not famous as the other ones like Cor Veleno, Brusco, Gli Inquilini and La Squadra from Rome, Club Dogo and Vacca from Milan, Co'Sang from Naples or L'altra Faccia del Sud or Stokka & Madbuddy from Palermo have emerged in the Italian hip-hop scene.

==== Republic of Macedonia ====
The Macedonian hip-hop started in the 1980s in the then Socialist Republic of Macedonia, but experienced considerable growth after the declaration of independence of the Republic of Macedonia. One of the first critically acclaimed acts was the rock band Super Nova from Skopje which utilized rap music elements in some of its songs. The group recorded several rap music tracks for the music production branch of the Macedonian Radio-Television, including Hip-hop blues, Rap, Vero and others, some including pop, rock, funk, reggae or other elements. Part of the songs were in Macedonian, while some were released in Serbo-Croatian for promotion across the wider former Yugoslav market. One of those songs was the anti-war themed Rapovanje. Its catchy rhyme "Bolje da se rapuje, nego da se ratuje" ("Better to do rapping, than to wage a war") made it very popular across the country in 1989. Currently, one of the notable underground hip-hop performers and producers in the Republic of Macedonia is Vladimir Agovski-Ago from Skopje. He became involved in the Macedonian hip-hop scene since childhood as a very young b-boy in 1986. In the following year he formed a juvenile rap act called The Masters of Rap and recorded his first studio track in 1988. In 1991 he joined the band Instant Beat, which performed around the country and made recordings in the Macedonian Radio-Television production, which were never officially released. Later, he formed another group The Most Wanted which in 1995 released the first Macedonian hardcore rap album, called "Judgment Day". After the group disbanded in 1996, he continued to work under the name Temnata strana (The Dark Side) and he founded the first Macedoninan hip-hop label, called "Dolina na senkite" abbreviated "DNS" (Valley of the Shadows) to promote his own works and other upcoming Macedonian hip-hop acts as well. The group Čista okolina was formed in 1989 by joining several previously existing juvenile rap bands, and later it rose to one of the most prominent hip-hop acts in the country. Čista okolina released the album "Noviot aspekt na starata škola" (The New Aspect of the Old School) in the spring of 1996. During its existence it also released a song together with the prominent alternative rock group Last Expedition. One of the Čista okolina's former members Vele Solunčev later became a frontman of the mixed-style music group appropriately named Mosaique, because it combined various elements such as hip-hop, jazz fusion, alternative rock and ethno-jazz. One of the most successful hip-hop acts in the country is SAF (Sakam Afro Frizura) formed in 1993. It consists of the emcees Smilen Dimitrov and Mitko Gaštarovski a.k.a. Pikisipi, as well as the band's backing DJ and turntablist, Goce Trpkov. In 1996 they released their well-known anti-drug abuse theme called Miss Stone. Its title is a pun between the historical person Miss Stone, the US missionary who met Jane Sandanski in Macedonia in the 1900s, and the phrase stoned. As the group became critically acclaimed, in the following year they started a music TV show called Hiphop teza. They released their debut album titled Safizam in 2001 and played a promotional concert with the prominent US hip-hop band Das EFX as a support act. Prominent Macedonian hip-hop artists in the 2000s include: Da Džaka Nakot, Legijata, Klan Istok, Edinstvena opcija, Puka kozmetika, Green Out, Speeding Bee, Str2 and many others. The early 1990s saw the emergence of many Macedonian pop-rap artists influenced by the then-popular MC Hammer and Vanilla Ice. These artists included for example the female solo singer Ena Veko, who released the LP "Bubački i gradski dzverki", and the duo Lastovica which consisted of Robert Sazdov and Vlado Janevski, who later became a solo pop singer and represented Macedonia in the Eurovision Song Contest in 1998. Behind most of these successful pop-rap acts was the prominent Macedonian composer and producer Toše Pop Simonov. The group Nulta Pozitiv was formed in parallel. Gradually they went more and more mainstream and became popular across the country, especially after recording the rap track nicknamed after the famous Macedonian folk song "Otvori go Pendžerčeto" ("Open the Window"). It featured an unconventional refrain for a rap song sung by the notable folk music singer Mirko Mitrevski. They released an album titled Transfuzija. Later emerged another pop-rap artist Kristijan Gabrovski from Prilep nicknamed Risto Bombata after Afrika Bambaataa. He and his backing band became very popular across the country for their mix of rap, pop-rock and pop-folk. In the mid-1990s an offshoot of Nulta Pozitiv was the more harder-sounding group named Attack which released the famous song "Atentatot na Kiro" after the assassination-attempt on the then-President of the Republic of Macedonia Kiro Gligorov in 1995. Later, one of the former Nulta Pozitiv members, Darko Dimitrov rose to a prominent Macedonian composer and producer. Among others, he also worked with the late 1990s/early 2000s pop-rap artists such as Vrčak and Ugro. One of the first prominent Macedonian rap music festivals was the so-called "Rap'n'Roll" fest which was held in the early 1990s in MKC, the Youth Cultural Centre in Skopje, followed by many others. Currently Macedonia hosts many hip-hop festivals featuring both domestic and foreign performers. A hip-hop clubbing scene also exists. Macedonian hip-hop performers also exist in the ethnic Macedonian diaspora, in countries such as the United States and Australia. The group Curse ov Dialect from Melbourne features the ethnic Macedonian member nicknamed Vulk Makedonski, and often incorporates elements of traditional Macedonian music.[1] [edit]

==== Portugal ====
Portuguese hip-hop (Hip-hop português) mostly known as hip-hop Tuga is the Portuguese variety of hip-hop, although different because it is mixed with African music from Lusophone Africa and reggae. It is often performed by African-Portuguese, descendants from African immigrants that came to Portugal after the independence of the former African colonies. The past 5 years have been productive and names such as Dealema, Mind Da Gap, Kilu a.k.a. Dellafyah(artist and producer, live beat maker) Greguz du Shabba, Valete, Sam The Kid (rapper & producer), Boss AC, Micro, Matozoo and Bomberjack gathered many followers in the underground subculture. Graffiti artist's names include, among others, Mosaik, Caos, Colman, Uber, Que? and Kayo. Portuguese rapper group 'DaWeasel' has also become significantly popular amongst Portuguese youths both nationally & internationally in establishing Portuguese Hip-Hop.

==== Serbia ====
Serbian hip hop started in the early 80's, with the birth of b-boy crews and their battles which have spread over the country in no time. The first sound recording of the Serbian hip-hop is the Degout EP by the band named The Master Scratch Band, which was released through Jugoton in the year 1984. – 5-tracker presenting b-boy electro-breakbeat tracks with a bit of rapping. In the late 80's, bands such are Budweiser, Green Kool Posse, Who Is The Best and Robin Hood started the first demo scene. The music spread slowly until 1995, when the first significant album was released: Da li imaš pravo? by Gru. This release marked the beginning of the first wave of Serbian hip-hop, which reached its peak in 1997–98, when many new groups started to break out from the underground: Voodoo Popeye, Full Moon, Straight Jackin, Sunshine, Bad Copy, Belgrade Ghetto, CYA, 187. Monteniggers, from Montenegro (at the time in a union with Serbia), were another popular rap group. Just as the scene was taking off, the flood of new talent slowed to a trickle, probably due to the economic effects of the Kosovo War of 1999, which resulted in only a few hip-hop albums released in 1999–2001. However, in 2002 the silence was shown to be temporary with the founding of the Bassivity label, which made Serbian, Bosnian and Croatian hip-hop widely available in record stores. Their first release, V.I.P. – Ekipa Stigla, was one of the two albums which marked the beginning of the second wave of Serbian hip-hop. The other was BSSST...Tišinčina by the Belgrade group Beogradski Sindikat. The same group also released the highly controversial political single Govedina in late 2002, which greatly aided the popularisation of hip-hop in Serbia.

Since 2002, Bassivity Music has released many more records and Beogradski Sindikat have followed up their debut with 2005's Svi Zajedno, having founded their own label, Prohibicija, due to their dissatisfaction with Automatik Records. One of the group's members, Škabo, has also released several solo albums.

Since 2007, the oldest independent label in Serbia, Take It Or Leave It records (established 1992), and their sub-label Rap Cartel released almost every rap album during this time. First rap CD published by Rap Cartel was a compilation "Rap Cartel-Pablo je pao vol.1" Main rap singers known and published by Rap Cartel label are:SHA, Bata Barata ex Shorty, Monogamija, Bitcharke na travi, Bvana iz lagune, Hartmann, J COOK, M.A.X., Prti Beegee, Day Who, De Niro, VOX and many less known artists. This label also published first licence album from America, CD HAVIKK-Rhymme son(South Central cartel).

==== Spain ====
Spanish hip-hop began in the late 1980s. Break dance crews used mainly American recordings, while local rappers practised for very small underground audiences. A few rock bands, like Os Resentidos, Kortatu and TDK tried and recorded some approaches to hip-hop, but kept most of their hard rock background.

In 1989 Troya Dscs&Rcrs label released the first Spanish hip-hop LP: Madrid Hip Hop, a compilation of four bands from the province of Madrid: DNI, Estado Crítico, Sindicato del Crimen and QSC. The record presented two cuts of each band.

Later in 1989, Ariola major label tried a new push to establish some hip-hop stars, with a new compilation of Madrilene hip-hop music: Rappin Madrid, introduced more soloists and groups, like MC Randy & D.J. Jonco.

Both attempts mostly failed, but helped to establish a viable scene in Madrid. Zona Bruta, the first Spanish hip-hop specialised label, was founded in 1994.

=== Western Europe ===
==== Belgium ====
Belgian hip-hop has a few rappers stemming from Africa. Belgium, like France, controlled African countries like the Democratic Republic of the Congo (formerly Zaire), Rwanda, and Burundi until the early 1960s. Like in France, immigrants from these countries started to study and live in Belgium.

The Belgian hip-hop scene started in the late 1980s with a US-based techno/hip-hop group called Technotronic. In the group was an emcee named Ya Kid K from the Democratic Republic of the Congo who later led the group into international fame with hits like "Pump up the Jam" and "Shake That Body". In 1990, she also joined the group Hi-Tek 3 who were heard on Teenage Mutant Ninja Turtles: The Original Motion Picture Soundtrack.

However, the first major pop rapper from Belgium was Benny B, who had a very mainstream and commercial sound. According to the European Music Office's report on Music in Europe, this was the first of many pop acts that helped inspire a backlash and the creation of an underground hip-hop scene.

In the early 1990s the Brussels' rap crew De Puta Madre started rapping in French and Spanish. They became an underground success and are still highly respected in the Belgian hip-hop scene.

In the late 1990s, Rwandan hip-hop pioneer J.C. Matata moved to Belgium and created a hip-hop/reggae/zouk group called ZAMZAM.

Also in the late 1990s in the Walloon south of the country, French speaking/rapping Starflam was the biggest name in hip-hop. In the Flemish north Dutch speaking/rapping groups like 't Hof van Commerce, St Andries MC's, ABN were popular and De Feesters (Flemish gangsta rap) rapping in their regional dialects.

Today Belgian hip-hop is on the rise, partly thanks to Niveau 4, which seeks to unite and popularise Belgian rappers. A few contemporary Belgian rappers are for instance Roméo Elvis, Damso, Coely and Woodie Smalls.

==== France ====
France has the most established hip-hop scenes in Europe. By 1982, a number of hip-hop radio stations had appeared, including Rapper Dapper Snapper, and the future star DJ Dee Nasty made his first appearance. That same year saw the first major hip-hop concert, the New York City Rap Tour, sponsored by Europe 1 and featuring Afrika Bambaataa, Grandmixer DST, Fab 5 Freddy, Mr Freeze and the Rock Steady Crew. Dee Nasty's Paname City Rappin', released in 1984, was the first French hip-hop record.

Similar to Britain, the popularity of French hip-hop has increased dramatically over the past decade, with artists such as Assassin, Lunatic, IAM or Suprême NTM all achieving some amount of success in their own country. Other notable artists include Booba, Sinik, Diam's and Rohff. A select few artists have also gained worldwide popularity, such as Saïan Supa Crew who appeared on The World According to RZA – a compilation of worldwide hip-hop created by RZA. One of the most popular French rappers is Senegalese-born MC Solaar, who is known for his complex and poetic lyrics. Currently France is nr 1 on the best hip-hop of Europe list.

==== Netherlands ====
The Osdorp Posse was the first successful rap-crew in the Netherlands. Osdorp Posse's frontman, who goes by the name Def P, is well known for his political awareness and social analyses. The song "Origineel Amsterdams" ended up in the top of the charts, a lucrative mainstream-career was just around the corner now. Instead, O.P realized that credibility lasts longer than fame. So they avoided selling out, and remained loyal to a smaller scene. In 1986, Dutch rap duo MC Miker G & DJ Sven (Lucien Witteveen and Sven van Veen) had a top 10 hit across Europe with "Holiday Rap", which sampled Madonna's "Holiday".

Extince Def Rhymz, Spookrijders & Brainpower helped develop the game next. Def Rhymz & Brainpower dropped multiple hit records. With at least 8 Top 100 album/EP projects Brainpower is one of the most successful Dutch MC's ever and remains a prolific bilingual lyricist (in Dutch & English) to this day. Other notable acts include Ali B (who has been featured on other artists' tracks, most significantly with Marco Borsato on the song "Wat zou je doen?" for the charity War Child) who achieved solo success with "Leipe mocro flavour". Together with his nephew Yes-R, he made an international remix of "Ghetto" together with Akon.; the duo Lange Frans & Baas B with their patriotic but introspective "Het Land Van"; and Yes-R Most notable for rap skills in the Netherlands these days is the rap group "Opgezwolle" (rapper Sticky Steez, rapper Phreako Rico and DJ Delic). Rapper Jawat, won the "Grote prijs van Nederland" 2006. The Netherlands has got a fast-growing "underground scene" and rapping in Dutch is very popular. Besides Dutch, songs are sometimes (partly) in English or French. Popular artist from nowadays are among others Boef, Lijpe and Josylvio. Popular rappers who also rap in French are Ismo and Rollàn.

Several Dutch rappers have worked with some of the biggest names in hip-hop like: Nas, The Outlawz, Sean Price, Heltah Skeltah, Scram Jones, Bone Thugs-n-Harmony, Akon, Redman, Method Man, Rza, Gza, Ol Dirty Bastard, LL Cool J, Run DMC, Public Enemy, Snoop Dogg, Ice Cube, Rick Ross, Wu Tang Clan, French rapper Sefyu, Romanian hip-hop group Parazitii.

Dutch rapper Cilvaringz is part of Wu Tang Killa Bees, an affiliate group of The Wu Tang Clan. Salah Edin is the world's best selling rapper in Arabic language, although he mostly raps Dutch. His beats are being produced by Dr. Dre's righthand producer Focus....

==== Switzerland ====
The Swiss hip-hop scene began in the early nineties, much like French, German and Italian rap. Early Swiss German rappers started rapping in English, but after the bilingual track "Murder by Dialect" by P-27 featuring Black Tiger, rappers switched to their native Swiss German dialects. Rappers from the French-speaking part (where the traditional dialects died out in most parts) and from the Italian-speaking part (where most people mix dialects and Standard Italian freely) only rap in the standard languages.

The European Music Office's report on Music in Europe claimed that Switzerland's hip-hop scene is "particularly innovative and advanced", featuring Unik Records (the first European indie rap label)

== See also ==
- Romani hip-hop
