= Lyrical Son =

Kosovar rapper and songwriter (born 1984)

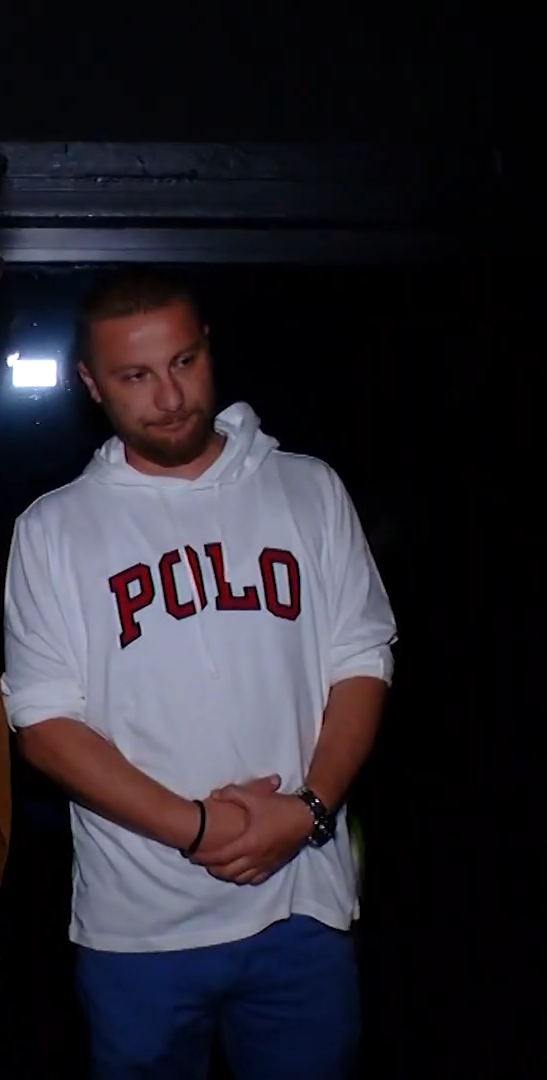
- Lyrical Son in 2019
- Born: Festim Arifi; 28 January 1984 (age 42); Pristina, Kosovo, Yugoslavia
- Occupations: Rapper, songwriter
- Years active: 2005–present
- Spouse: Gresa Krasniqi (m. 2014)
- Children: 2
- Musical career
- Label: PINT

Festim Arifi (Albanian: [festim arifi]; born 28 January 1984), known professionally as Lyrical Son, is a Kosovan rapper and songwriter. Born and raised in Pristina, Arifi is credited as a viable hip hop artist in the Albanian-speaking Balkans.

== Life and career ==
=== 1984–2000: Early life and career beginnings ===
Lyrical Son was born as Festim Arifi on 28 January 1984 into an ethnic Albanian family in the city of Pristina, then part of the SFR Yugoslavia, present Kosovo. Arifi began rapping at high school in his youth and started pursuing a music career seriously, after the Kosovo War in 1999. During his elementary school years, he eventually adopted his stage name, which was taken after a notebook entry from his English teacher. Lyrical Son started to become a household name in the Albanian hip hop scene in the early 2000s with his catchy hooks and creative writing and flows on his verses. In October 19, 2008, he released his first solo album titled "Recept" . The outstanding song from the album is the all time classic "Po Pritoj". Three years later, Lyrical Son together with Mc Kresha, Strike Beatz, K-Master and Onufër Berisha started the music label P.I.N.T ( Për Inati T'Njoni Tjetrit ). The music label has become one of the most prominent labels in the Albanian hip hop scene with having several successful albums, signing young artists & producers and elevating their careers.

=== 2019–present: United State Of Albania and Muzikë e Alltisë ===
In July 2018, Arifi was announced as an act at the Sunny Hill Festival on its debut edition in Pristina. In August 2019, Arifi was approached to perform for a second time at the Sunny Hill Festival. In late December 2021, Arifi together with MC Kresha announced their fourth collaborative album, Muzikë e Alltisë, which was eventually released on 12 January 2022.

== Personal life ==
Arifi married his longtime partner Gresa Krasniqi on 19 August 2014 in Pristina, Kosovo.

== Discography ==
=== Albums ===
==== Studio albums ====
Title	Album details
Recept	Released: 19 October 2008; Label: Independent; Format: Digital download, streaming
Zimasamshevy	Released: 13 August 2013; Label: AVD Digital, PINT; Format: Digital download, streaming

==== Collaborative albums ====
Title	Album details	Peak chart positions
Title	Album details	SWI
Për Inati T'njoni Tjetrit (with MC Kresha)	Released: 27 October 2011; Label: PINT; Format: digital download, streaming	—
Rapsodët n'Rap t'Sotit (with MC Kresha)	Released: 10 June 2016; Label: PINT; Format: digital download, streaming	4
United State Of Albania (with MC Kresha, Elinel, Erno, Lluni, Semiautomvtik)	Released: 17 February 2019; Label: AVD Digital, PINT; Format: Digital download, streaming	—
Muzikë e Alltisë (with MC Kresha)	Released: 12 January 2022; Label: AVD Digital, PINT; Format: Digital download, streaming	35
"—" denotes a recording that did not chart or was not released in that territory.

=== Singles ===
==== As lead artist ====
Title	Year	Peak chart positions	Album
Title	Year	ALB	Album
"Respekt (Kllap)"	2005	—N/a	Non-album single
"Ti vozit më mirë së unë" (with Big Mama)	2006	—N/a	Non-album single
"Rram" (with Mad Lion)	2006	—N/a	Non-album single
"Sexy Linda"	2008	—N/a	Recept
"Mu bo estrad"	2008	—N/a	Recept
"Tabullarasa"	2010	—N/a	Non-album single
"Souljah" (featuring MC Kresha and Noga)	2010	—N/a	Non-album single
"Start" (with Samanta Karavella and Big Basta)	2011	—N/a	Non-album single
"Pse t'fola"	2011	—N/a	Për Inati T'njoni Tjetrit
"Kon pe shan me non" (with MC Kresha featuring Singullar	2011	—N/a	Për Inati T'njoni Tjetrit
"Hip Hopin e du" (with MC Kresha)	2012	—N/a	Për Inati T'njoni Tjetrit
"Nuk ini gangsta" (with MC Kresha)	2012	—N/a	Për Inati T'njoni Tjetrit
"Qëllimi"	2012	—N/a	Zimasamshevy
"Sensimilia" (featuring BimBimma)	2012	—N/a	Zimasamshevy
"La Pintamilja" (with ErgeNR)	2012	—N/a	Zimasamshevy
"Mos shko" (featuring Nuke)	2013	—N/a	Zimasamshevy
"Me ta pyl" (featuring MC Kresha)	2013	—N/a	Zimasamshevy
"Special" (featuring MC Kresha)	2013	—N/a	Zimasamshevy
"Rock N Roll Star" (featuring ErgeNR)	2013	—N/a	Zimasamshevy
"A thu kush"	2015	—	Rapsodët n'Rap t'Sotit
"Hey Hey Hey"	2016	—	Rapsodët n'Rap t'Sotit
"Ky Tipi" (with MC Kresha)	2016	—	Rapsodët n'Rap t'Sotit
"Hip Hop" (with MC Kresha featuring Ledri Vula)	2016	1	Rapsodët n'Rap t'Sotit
"Thirri krejt shoqet" (with MC Kresha)	2016	—	Rapsodët n'Rap t'Sotit
"I re pishmon"	2016	—	Rapsodët n'Rap t'Sotit
"Spo ma nin" (with MC Kresha)	2016	—	Rapsodët n'Rap t'Sotit
"Jeni marrë" (with MC Kresha)	2016	—	Rapsodët n'Rap t'Sotit
"Hey Girl" (with MC Kresha)	2017	13	United State Of Albania
"Sonte" (with Ronela Hajati)	2017	22	Non-album single
"Duqa mi duqa" (with MC Kresha)	2017	—	United State Of Albania
"Rruga n'club" (with Blleki and MC Kresha)	2018	—	United State Of Albania
"Mafia Shqip"	2018	—	United State Of Albania
"Menemadhe" (with Ledri Vula and MC Kresha)	2018	1	United State Of Albania
"JBMTQR" (with Lluni)	2018	—	United State Of Albania
"Private" (with MC Kresha and Semiautomvtic)	2019	—	Non-album single
"Pasite" (with Tayna and MC Kresha)	2019	1	Non-album single
"100" (with Ledri Vula and Singullar)	2020	—	Non-album single
"Ajo po don" (with MC Kresha)	2020	—	Non-album single
"Criminal Immigrant" (with Mc Kresha)	2021	—	Non-album single
"Dilëm jasht" (with Mc Kresha)	2021	—	Non-album single
"—" denotes a recording that did not chart or was not released in that territory.

==== As featured artist ====
Title	Year	Peak chart positions	Album
Title	Year	ALB	Album
"Ende" (Mad Lion featuring Lyrical Son)	2003	—N/a	Non-album single
"Hot Festival" (Mad Lion featuring Lyrical Son)	2005	—N/a	Non-album single
"Një mbret një mbretëreshë" (Arta Bajrami featuring Lyrical Son)	2005	—N/a	Non-album single
"All Night" (Etno Engjujt featuring Besnik Qaka, Kaos and Lyrical Son)	2008	—N/a	Non-album single
"Pun e madhe!" (Mirsa featuring Lyrical Son)	2008	—N/a	Non-album single
"La Vida Loca (Remix Me Dosta)" (Blero featuring F-Kay, Kaos, MC Kresha, Skillz and Lyrical Son)	2009	—N/a	Non-album single
"Shihëm prap" (Newporn featuring Lyrical Son)	2010	—N/a	Non-album single
"Ska kufi" (BimBimma featuring Lyrical Son)	2011	—N/a	Non-album single
"Shqiptart e parë n'hane" (Gent Fatali featuring Lyrical Son)	2013	—N/a	Non-album single
"Çele çadrën" (Dj Flow featuring Lyrical Son)	2013	—N/a	Non-album single
"Para" (Butch featuring KeepMan, Mc Kresha and Lyrical Son)	2013	—N/a	Non-album single
"Facedown" (Capital T featuring 2po2 and Lyrical Son)	2014	—N/a	Non-album single
"Prishtinali" (2po2 featuring Capital T, Dj Blunt, Dj Flow, Lumi B, Lyrical Son, Mixey, Real 1 and Lyrical Son)	2014	—N/a	Non-album single
"Shqip Dance" (Etno Engjujt featuring Lyrical Son)	2014	—N/a	Non-album single
"Beat Murderer" (Mc Kresha featuring KeepMan and Lyrical Son)	2014	—N/a	Non-album single
"They Don't Know" (BimBimma featuring Lyrical Son)	2015	—N/a	Non-album single
"A t'merr malli" (Genc Prelvukaj featuring Lyrical Son)	2016	—	Non-album single
"Pa cenzurë" (Capital T featuring Vig Poppa and Lyrical Son)	2017	12	Non-album single
"Andërr" (Genc Prelvukaj featuring Lyrical Son)	2018	—	Non-album single
"Princess Diana" (Ledri Vula featuring Lyrical Son)	2018	3	Non-album single
"Deja vu" (Kida featuring Lyrical Son)	2019	1	Non-album single
"Rick Ross" (Lluni featuring MC Kresha and Lyrical Son)	2019	—	Non-album single
"Llafe Llafe" (Dafina Zeqiri featuring Lyrical Son)	2021	1	Dafinë moj
"Maje" (Lumi B featuring MC Kresha and Lyrical Son)	2021	—	Non-album single
"—" denotes a recording that did not chart or was not released in that territory.

==== Other charted songs ====
Title	Year	Peak chart positions	Album
Title	Year	ALB	Album
"Hotel Mahalla" (with MC Kresha)	2022	34	Muzikë e Alltisë
"Paret Lejla" (with MC Kresha)	2022	29	Muzikë e Alltisë
"Stuhi mbi oqean" (with MC Kresha featuring Elvana Gjata)	2022	3	Muzikë e Alltisë
"Rammstein" (with MC Kresha)	2022	16	Muzikë e Alltisë
"—" denotes a recording that did not chart or was not released in that territory.
