= Etnon =

Hip-hop duo from Kosovo

- Also known as: Etno Engjujt
- Origin: Pristina, Kosovo
- Years active: 1997– 2018
- Label: Black Fish Entertainment
- Members: Genc Prelvukaj; Milot Hasangjekaj

Etnon (formerly Etno Engjujt) was a Kosovar duo from Pristina that formed in 1997. The group consisted of Genc Prelvukaj (born July 17, 1981) and Milot Hasangjekaj, known respectively as Gentz and Mc`M.

Etnon had been known for their fusion of ethnic Albanian music with rhythm of modern hip-hop. The group managed to be among the most popular acts during post-war years because of the appeal of their heavy nationalism. Their song "Albanian" from their fourth album Vitamin E was their most influential song, and has left traces in the Albanian music scene. The nationalism shown in music video for the song caused it to be banned from airing in Montenegro. Etnon produced seven albums over their 21 years of activity. The group is no longer active, as the members split in 2018. Prelvukaj stayed within the music industry as the CEO of Black Fish Entertainment and has found success in his solo career. Hasangjekaj is no longer active in the industry entirely after his solo act from 2017-2021 known as BigEm. In 2019, after the group's dissolve, many of Etnon's songs were published by Prelvukaj onto Spotify, Deezer, and iTunes via compilations.

Etnon often cooperated with other Albanian singers, such as Mad Lion, Don Arbas, Lyrical Son, Tingulli 3nt, Genta Ismajli, and Arta Bajrami.

== Musical style ==
Etnon's style was generally a fusion of west-coast style Hip-Hop with ethnic Albanian music. Their earlier work covered topics of Albanian ethnic pride and nationalism, as well as other political topics. However, in 2009, the band transitioned to partying and other lighter topics as their main subject matter. This change in subject matter also triggered a change in name for the group, becoming Etnon in place of Etno Engjujt (translating to Ethnic Angels), which the members believed was unnecessarily nationalist for the new style.

== Members ==
The group consisted of Genc Prelvukaj, known as Gentz, and Milot Hasangjekaj, known as Mc'M, and later BigEm. Generally, Prelvukaj produced and wrote for the group during its activity. Prelvukaj has been married to singer and songwriter Eni Koçi since 2019 and has a daughter named Adea and a son named Gjini. Prelvukaj also makes his own music under his own name independently from Etnon. He was a political advisor in Pristina from 2010 to 2015. Hasangjekaj became somewhat independent from the duo in 2017, to be known independently as BigEm, with some songs still being produced by Prelvukaj. His second child was born in 2017. The birth of his children and his marriage have led him to focus more on his personal life, staying away from the music industry as of September 2022.

== Black Fish Entertainment ==
Genc Prelvukaj founded the production company and record label Black Fish Entertainment, originally Gramafon entertainment. Etnon's later music was published under the label, and Prelvukaj is the CEO of the company. The company also produces the music videos for the artists it publishes. Prelvukaj and the record label have been highly critical of Top Awards for their lack of a nomination for the song "Shake It", a collaboration between Etnon and Genta Ismajli, among other highly successful songs of 2016. This served as a criticism toward Top Awards and their knowledge of the Albanian music industry as a whole and brought into question bias in their awarding.

== Discography ==
- Dua Të Jetoj Më Mirë (1999)
- The Dynasty (2001)
- Etno Engjujt (2003)
- Vitamin E (2005)
- 10she (2007)
- Ethnomenon (2009)
- 7th Chapter (2012)
