= Dolphin (musician) =

Russian singer-songwriter (born 1971)

Dolphin Дельфин
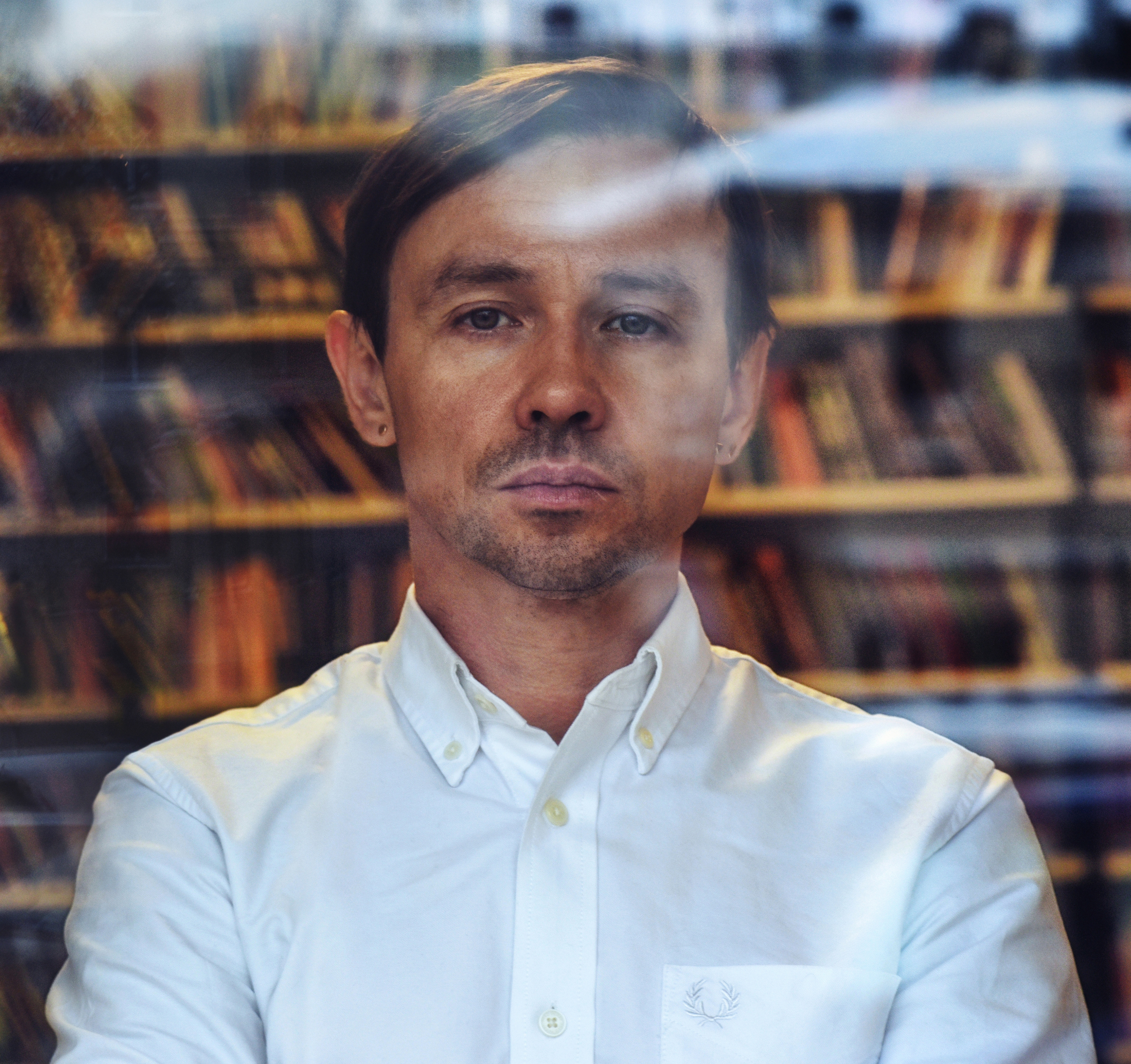

Background information
- Also known as: Dolphin, Дельфин
- Born: Andrey Vyacheslavovich Lysikov; 29 September 1971 (age 54); Moscow, USSR
- Genres: Alternative rap, alternative rock, experimental rock, post-punk, noise rock, shoegaze, trip hop, experimental hip hop, spoken word
- Occupations: Producer, rapper, singer, songwriter
- Years active: 1989–present
- Labels: Cream Records, Universal Records
- Formerly of: Malchishnik
- Website: www.dolphinmusic.ru

Andrey Vyacheslavovich Lysikov (born 29 September 1971 in Moscow, USSR), better known by his stage name Dolphin (Дельфин), is a Russian musical artist, singer, songwriter, poet and rapper. He is a former member and lyricist of the rap groups Malchishnik and Dubovy Gaay.

In 2004, he was awarded "Best Performer" at the MTV Russian Music Awards. He also performed at the Live 8 Russia concert.

== Biography ==
Dolphin was born in Moscow on 29 September 1971. His family lived in the Ochakovo-Matveyevskoye District. As a child, he was a fan of Depeche Mode and began listening to hip-hop when the first wave of breakdancing began in the Soviet Union.

In August 1991, Dolphin joined the rap group Malchishnik. It was at that moment that he realized it was time to stop selling "matreshkas" and breakdancing at Arbat street and actually try to achieve something in the music business. Quickly, he became the obvious leader and author of practically all lyrics.

Dolphin's appearance in Malchishnik immediately changed the band's image and turned the boy's band creation into a brand new project, whose main idea was to shock the public. Everything about Malchishnik – their lyrics, behavior at concerts, the image of the guys – all was about épatage. The band's biggest hit single was Dolphin's song "Sex Non Stop" (the very name of the song was absolutely unacceptable to the post-Soviet pop music of that time).

In 1993, still being in Malchishnik, Dolphin started recording his solo tracks, feeling a need for creating something different. Since 1996, when Malchishnik split up, Dolphin continued to produce album after album, striking his fans and music critics with shrill and frank lyrics and powerful sound. During his musical career Dolphin released 13 albums.

He became a cult person and an idol of a whole generation, but at the same time he stands aside from Russia's rock and pop so-called "elite". He was never estimated as any musical type with the generally used term. Though, conditionally, he describes his style as: poetry reading, with an edge – to an electronic/rock beat.

Dolphin is respected by professional writers, and the National Russian Writers' Union acknowledges him as one of the most outstanding modern poets. In the year 2000 Dolphin was awarded one of the most prestigious Russian awards – "Triumph" – for his contribution to the national music culture.

In 2002 he signed his contract with Universal Music Russia. His album "Zvezda" ("The Star") has been released 21 March 2004.One of the album's tracks, "Glaza" ("Eyes") was written and produced by Dolphin together with Stella Katsoudos, a well known after her collaborations with Peter Gabriel, Trent Reznor, and Ministry.

The singles from the album, "Vesna" ("Spring") and "Romance" ("Love song") were at the top of Russian radio charts for over 20 weeks and brought Dolphin to a new stage of popularity throughout the country.

His latest album, "Kraj" ("Edge") was released in 2019.

=== Мальчишник/Malchishnik ===
Мальчишник (or Malchishnik) was hip-hop/dance/pop from 1995 till 1997.

Releases with Dolphin

- Поговорим о Сексе, (Pogovorim o Sekse/Let's Talk about Sex), (1991)
- Мисс Большая Грудь, (Miss Bolshaya Grud/Miss Big Breast), (1992)
- Кегли, (Kegli/Skittles), (1995)

=== Дубовый Гаайъ ===
Releases

- Концерт в Риге (live), (Kontsert v Rige/Live in Riga), (1991)
- Stop Killing Dolphins, (1992)
- Синяя лирика No.2, (Sinyaya Lirika No.2/Blue Lyric No.2), (1993)

=== Мишины Дельфины/Mishiny Delfiny ===
Mishiny Delfiny (or Мишины Дельфины) was side-project of Andrey Lysikov (Dolphin) and Mikhail Voinov ("Дубовый Гаайъ" member) from 1995 till 1997. Just one album was released.

Albums

- Игрушки, (Igrushki/Toys), (1997)

== Personal life ==
Dolphin is married to photographer Lika Gulliver. They have 2 children: daughter Eve (1998) and son Myron (2008).

== Awards and nominations ==
Year	Awards	Work	Category	Result
2004	MTV Europe Music Awards	Himself	Best Russian Act	Nominated

== Collaborators/Members of live band ==
=== Current members/collaborators ===
- Vasiliy Yakovlev — drums (2015—present)
- Alexander Mayorov — sound engineer (2014—present)

=== Former members/collaborators ===
- Viktor Shevtsov — sound engineer, guitar, programming (1997–2004)
- Ivan Chernikov — bass, guitar, drum machine, sound engineer (1997–2001)
- Pavel Peretolchin — guitar, synthesizer (1998)
- Anton Korolev — sound engineer (2002–2004)
- Pavel Dodonov — guitar, bass, programming (2002–2016)
- Alexander Petrunin (aka Mewark) — guitar (2003–2004)
- Alexey Nazarchuk — drums (2004–2005)
- Renat Ibragimov — sound engineer, keyboards, bass, drum machine (2007–2014)
- Konstantin Poznekov — sound engineer, sound designer (2014)
- Sergey Govorun — drums (2014–2015)
- Dmitriy Emelianov — guitar (2016)
- Igor Babko — guitar (2016–2026)

== Discography ==
Studio Albums

- Не в фокусе, (Ne v fokuse/Out of focus), (1997)
- Глубина резкости, (Glubina rezkosti/Depth of field), (1998)
- Плавники, (Plavniki/Flippers), (2000, recorded in 1998)
- Ткани, (Tkani/Tissues), (2001)
- Звезда, (Zvezda/Star), (2004) – SIM Records
- Юность, (Yunost/Youth), (2007)
- Существо, (Sushchestvo/Creature), (2011)
- Андрей, (Andrey/Andrey), (2014)
- Она, (Ona/Her), (2016)
- 442, (2018)
- Край, (Kray/Edge), (2019)

Other

- Серый Альбом (unreleased), (Seryi Albom/Grey Album), (1998)
- Я буду жить (live), (Ya budu zhit/I shall live), (2000)
- Любимые песни фанатов Дельфина (Compilation), (Favourite songs of the Dolphin's fans), (2002)
- Глаза (single), (Glaza/Eyes), (2003) – Universal
- Запись концерта 19.11.04 (live), (Record of the concert 11.19.04), (2004) – SIM Records
- Туннель (unreleased yet), (Tunnel), (2010–?)

== Soundtrack ==
- Даже не думай ("Dazhe ne dumay"), (2002)
- Даже не думай 2: Тень независимости("Dazhe ne dumay 2: Ten' Nezavisimosti"), (2004)
- Grand Theft Auto IV Song "Рэп" (Rap), (2008)
