= Taki Tsan =

- Taki Tsan performing at AN Club (Athens, Greece) on 30 June 2008

Background information
- Also known as: Timvorihos, Pedi Thavma, Litrotis
- Born: Panagiotis Stravalexis; 28 September 1979 (age 47); San Diego, California, U.S.
- Origin: Nea Ionia, Athens, Greece
- Occupations: Rapper producer
- Years active: 1997–present
- Label: Ihokratoria
- Website: myspace.com/takitsan

Panagiotis Stravalexis (Greek: Παναγιώτης Στραβαλέξης, born 28 September 1979), also known by his stage names Waze-Taki-Tsan (short for Westley) Timvorihos, Pedi Thavma (Greek: Παιδί Θαύμα, English: The Child Prodigy), and Taki Tsan; is a Greek music producer, tattoo artist and rapper. He is a founding member of the group Zontanoi Nekroi and a member of the rap duet Tigre Sporakia (Greek: Τιγρέ Σποράκια).

In 1999, he released his solo debut album under the name Pedi Thavma, named Rima Gia Chrima (Greek: Ρίμα Για Χρήμα, English: Rhyme For Money). Taki Tsan was also a founding member of the rap group Tigre Sporakia (Greek: Τιγρέ Σποράκια), which consisted of him and Isvoleas (Greek: Εισβολέας, English: Invader).

Several albums followed, some of them being solo ones, like Sto Mialo Tou Panagioti Stravaleksi (Greek: Στο Μυαλό Του Παναγιώτη Στραβαλέξη, English: Inside Panagiotis Stravalexis' Mind), which released in 2006. Another one was To Scholeio (Greek: Το Σχολείο, English: The School), where he collaborated with another Zontanoi Nekroi member, Harmanis (Greek: Χαρμάνης). In 2009, Tsan released Rima gia Chrima 2, his new double LP.

== Biography ==
=== 1997–1998: Zontanoi Nekroi ===
In 1997, he formed his group, "Zontanoi Nekroi", and started recording tracks with them. They released an EP in 1997, named "ZN Entoles/Stin Chora Ton Kaliteron MCs". In 1998, they released their first and only album, O Protos Tomos, which at the time was considered offensive by a lot of people because in that album the group was dealing with subjects like drugs and violence.

=== 1999: Rima gia Hrima ===
He continued with Rima gia Hrima (English: Rhyme for Money), his solo debut, which was well received. This album's style was very different from his previous ZN albums' raw style and had a more personal feeling. It is considered to be one of the best Greek hip-hop albums.

=== 2000: Projects that were never released ===
In 2000, ZN started recording "Kata.R.Ypo", a duet album by Ypochthonios and Katachthonios, but never released it. In 2001, they were about to release Harmanis' debut solo, Sisihaha, but that project never made it either for unknown reasons. So, having collected several unreleased songs, they released a compilation album named Thammena Ksechasmena which contained songs from "Kata.R.Ypo", a song that did not fit into Rima gia Chrima, the first track that was recorded for Megalos Iroas, Midenistis' first solo album, and some alternate editions of old songs from "O Protos Tomos".

=== 2003–2004: Tigre Sporakia and Harmanis / Taki Tsan ===
In 2003, Taki Tsan formed a new group with Isvoleas (a member of the group "Agnostoi Gnostoi" a.k.a. "Alfa Gama") named Tigre Sporakia. They released their first album named Theoria kai Praksi, which was well received by the fans. Taki returned to his raw style and one of the main themes of the album was drugs and money. In 2004, Taki Tsan and Harmanis collaborated to release an album named To Sholio (English: The School). The album was ready in about 11 days and the main producer was DJ ALX.

=== 2005–2006: 3 mixtapes and one solo album ===
In 2005, Taki Tsan released 2 mixtapes: Underground Mixtape and Mixtape vol. 1 from IxoSpira. In 2006, he released his last mix tape to date named Misa Lefta/Dipli Magkia, which was more like a compilation, containing old and unreleased songs. In the same year, he released his 2nd solo album, Sto Mialo tou Panagioti Stravalexi. It was a major change to his style, containing social and political tracks, as well as things he wanted to share with his fans.

=== 2007–2009: lives and new album ===
He has done many lives, 3 with all of the ZN members. He has also released several tracks on the internet, which gave a taste of his upcoming project, named Rima gia Chrima 2009 (sequel to his debut), which was released in December 2009 under the final name "Rima gia Chrima 2", a double album that sold about 5,000 copies.

=== 2009–2012: Rima gia Chrima Tour, TOMAHOK, 2 more mixtapes and Tigre Sporakia the Band ===
After the release of Rima gia Chrima 2, Taki Tsan and many of his affiliates began his "Rima gia Chrima Tour" all over Greece, with more than 20 live performances. After the end of the tour, he and Isvoleas started to work on their second project as Tigre Sporakia, but this time with a live band. The group was renamed Tigre Sporakia the Band and changed their logo. Also at that time, Taki's official website, [takitsan.com] opened for the fans and in order to celebrate the opening, Taki Tsan released a new mixtape, called "Exclusive Mixtape" or "The Lost Mixtape" which was composed of 8 tracks.

In 2011, Taki joined TOMAHOK, a new crew which was created by Isvoleas. On 25 February of the same year, the group's new album, "Onoma kai Pragma" was released through No Label Records and received mixed criticism from the fans, because of their changed style. His next mixtape, "Athens' Finest" was available for free download via his site, and was produced by an American beatmaker called Hamma. Taki Tsan now continues to work with Isvoleas on their third album which is to be released in 2012.

=== 2018: Rebetiko ===
Taki Tsan learned to play baglama and embraced the Greek underground music genre called rebetiko and from now on he is known as Takaros on YouTube. His YouTube channel is named TSANNEL.

== Discography with ZN ==
- 1997 ZN Entoles/Stin Chora ton Kaliteron MCs, EP IHOKRATORIA / FM Records
- 1998 Protos Tomos, IHOKRATORIA / FM Records
- 2001 Thamena Ksehasmena IHOKRATORIA / FM Records
- 2015 Pasa Ntoumania/Paraisthiseis, IHOKRATORIA / Capital Music

== Solo discography ==
- 1999 Rima gia Chrima, IHOKRATORIA / FM Records
- 2006 Sto Mialo tou Panagioti Stravalexi, IhoSpira / FM Records
- 2009 Ein' O Man, EP, Sporty Magazine
- 2009 Rima gia Chrima 2 IHOKRATORIA / 33 1/3 Entertainment
- 2014 To Systima, EP, IHOKRATORIA / 33 1/3 Entertainment

== Discography with Tigre Sporakia ==
- 2003 Theoria kai praksi IHOKRATORIA / FM Records
- 2011 Onoma kai Pragma No Label Records

== Collaborations ==
- 2004 To Sxoleio, with Harmanis, IXOSPIRA / FM Records
- 2005 Dipli Magkia, Misa Lefta Treli Ftiaxi, with DJ ALX, IXOSPIRA
- 2010 Gia Ta Paidia, with Diezel, CD single
- 2020 Vybez, with Lil Barty, Capital Music / Panik Records
- 2022 PhyroTsan, with Phyrosun

== Appearances ==
- 1997 Hontres Douleies, as Timvorixos & Midenistis, FM Records
- 1999 I Ihokratoria Parousiazei Meros A, with Tigre Sporakia, IXOKRATORIA / FM Records
- 1999 En Opsei (Paremvoles), Polydor
- 2000 La Klikaria, Imiz Biz Entertainment, Def Jam/Universal
- 2001 Agnostofovia (Alfa Gama), IXOKRATORIA / FM Records
- 2002 Megalos Iroas (Midenistis), IHOKRATORIA / FM Records
- 2004 The Instrumentals I Like (Eisvoleas)
- 2004 La Sagrada Familia (Goin' Through), Family The Label, Def Jam/Universal
- 2004 Mono Gia Ta Aftia Sou (Dj Alx)
- 2006 Den Ehoun Styl (Dj Alx)
- 2006 Synyparxi (Evnus)
- 2007 Eimai (White Dragon)
- 2009 Airetika Erotikos (Mithridatis), Imiz Biz Entertainment, Legend
- 2009 The Box LP, Part 1 (Cenobite), Cenobite Productions
- 2010 Metaxy Ouranou Kai Gis (Gelos), IXOKRATORIA
- 2010 Grand Champion Hot Joints (Dj The Boy)
- 2010 Gkegke (Eisvoleas), Lyra / Tomahok
- 2010 The Escape Key, IHOKRATORIA
- 2010 Dask1 (Dask)
- 2011 O Rapper Tis Hronias (Dimitris Mentzelos), Imiz Biz Entertainment, IHOKRATORIA, Cenobite Productions, Legend
- 2011 Etsi Tin Vlepo (Skies), Lyra
