= Malchishnik =

Russian sex rap group

- Origin: Moscow, Russia
- Genres: Russian hip hop; dirty rap
- Years active: 1990–1994, 2000–present
- Members: DJ Dan (Andrey Kotov); Mutabor (Pavel Galkin)
- Past members: Dolphin (Andrey Lisikov)
- Website: www.mal4ishnik.ru

Malchishnik (Russian: Мальчи́шник — The Stag Night) is a Russian hip hop group from who were the first Russian rap artists to gain mainstream popularity during earlier 1990s.

== History ==
=== Formation ===
Initially producer and manager Alexey Adamov aimed to form a commercially successful boy band. The group was planned as a Soviet counterpart of then-popular New Kids on The Block. Adamov recruited five young guys for the band from Arbat breakdancers.

Adamov then asked Dolphin (Andrey Lisikov), a breakdancer, apprentice song-writer and a friend of Dan to write some lyrics for the group. Dolphin was satisfied with his fee, so when Mutabor couldn't practice in group's first tour because of his wedding ceremony, Dolphin agreed to substitute him. He effectively joined Malchishnik in the summer of 1991.

=== Reunion ===
In 2000 DJ Dan and Mutabor reunited to record new Malchishnik songs. They cite nostalgia and fun as motivational factors.

They have since recorded and released four studio albums and one live record. None gained any mainstream success or media coverage, as they appealed neither to newer generations of hip hop fans nor to pop audience.

Their current record company is Classic Company, a record label which specializes in publishing shanson music, with Malchishnik as their only rap artists.

== Discography ==
1991 - Let's Talk about Sex (Поговорим о сексе)
1. Night (Ночь) lyrics by Dolphin, produced by Mutabor
2. I'm not gonna be with you (Я не буду с тобой) lyrics by DJ Dan, produced by Mutabor
3. Let's talk about sex (Поговорим о сексе) lyrics by Dolphin, produced by Mutabor
4. I want you (Я хочу тебя) lyrics by Dolphin, produced by Mutabor
5. Sex without a break (Секс без перерыва) lyrics by Dolphin, produced by Mutabor
6. The sister (Сестра) lyrics by Dolphin, produced by Mutabor
7. Dances (Танцы) lyrics by Dolphin, produced by Mutabor
8. Klava (Клава) lyrics by Dolphin, produced by Mutabor
9. Last time (Последний раз) lyrics by Dolphin, produced by Mutabor
10. Sex-control (Секс-контроль) lyrics by Dolphin, produced by Mutabor
11. Rock'n'Roll (Рок-н-рол) lyrics by Dolphin, produced by Mutabor
12. Ms. Big Bosoms (Мисс Большая Грудь) lyrics by Dolphin, produced by Mutabor
13. I want you (mix) (Я хочу тебя (mix) lyrics by Dolphin, produced by Mutabor
14. Everything is all right (Всё хорошо) lyrics by Mutabor, produced by Mutabor
15. The strong guy (Сильный парень) lyrics by Mutabor, produced by Mutabor
16. I do not believe you (Я вам не верю) lyrics by Mutabor, produced by Mutabor
17. Me and my friends (Я и мои друзья) lyrics by Mutabor, produced by Mutabor
1992 - Ms. Big Bosoms (Мисс Большая Грудь)

1994 - Skittles (Кегли)

2000 - Sandals (Сандали)
1. Da'suk (da'сук) lyrics by Mutabor, produced by Mutabor
2. Boogie nights (Ночи в стиле буги) lyrics by Mutabor, produced by Mutabor
3. Boogie nights part 2 (Ночи в стиле буги - 2) lyrics by N. Karimov, produced by Mutabor
4. Women and cabbage (Бабы и бабло) lyrics by N. Karimov, produced by Mutabor
5. Sea (морская) produced by Mutabor
6. Sea part 2 (морская-2) lyrics by N. Karimov, produced by Mutabor
7. The nudist beach (Нудистский пляж) lyrics by N. Karimov, produced by Mutabor
8. Malchishnik 2000 (Мальчишник 2000) lyrics by Dolphin, produced by DJ Dan
9. Now that's something like it! (Вот это да!) lyrics by Mutabor, produced by Mutabor
10. 117th (117-я) lyrics by N. Karimov, produced by DJ Dan
11. Lips that worn outside (Губы навыпуск produced by Mutabor
12. Nudist beach Miguel star f... ker mix (Нудистский пляж Мигуэль star f...ker mix) produced by miguel
13. Malchishnik 2001 (Мальчишник 2001 produced by DJ Dan
2002 - Shaft (Оглобля)
1. Boorime (Буриме) lyrics by Mutabor, produced by Mutabor
2. Kama-s-utra (Кама'с'утра) lyrics by Mutabor, produced by Mutabor
3. Outskirts (Окраины lyrics by A. Hohlin, produced by Mutabor
4. Boom bank boogie (Бум банк буги) lyrics by Mutabor, produced by Mutabor
5. Fall up (Падай наверх) lyrics by Mutabor, produced by Mutabor
6. Evil sodas (Зл. соды lyrics by E. Rudin, produced by Mutabor
7. Adventures (Похождения) lyrics by N. Karimov, produced by Mutabor
8. Yin yang (Инь янь) lyrics by N. Karimov, produced by Mutabor
9. Power (Власть) lyrics by N. Karimov, produced by Mutabor
10. Streets of the city (Улицы города) lyrics by N. Karimov, produced by Mutabor
11. Idiot (Идиот) lyrics by E. Rudin, produced by E. Rudin
2003 - Malchishnik@S.P.B. Live (Мальчишник@С.П.Б. Live)
1. Sex without a break (секс без перерыва) lyrics by Dolphin, produced by Mutabor
2. Boorime (Буриме) lyrics by Mutabor, produced by Mutabor
3. Kama-s-utra (Кама`с`утра) lyrics by Mutabor, produced by Mutabor
4. Boom bank boogie (Бум банк буги) lyrics by Mutabor, produced by Mutabor
5. I want you (Я хочу тебя) lyrics by Dolphin, produced by Mutabor
6. Boogie nights (Ночи в стиле буги) lyrics by N. Karimov, produced by Mutabor
7. Malchishnik 2000 (Мальчишник 2000) lyrics by N. Karimov, produced by DJ Dan
8. Women and cabbage (Бабы и бабло) lyrics by N. Karimov, produced by Mutabor
9. Klava (Клава) lyrics by Dolphin, produced by Mutabor
10. Da'Suk(Да'сук) lyrics by Mutabor, produced by Mutabor
11. Lyrics #3 (Лирика №3) lyrics by Mutabor, муз.Mutabor
12. Yin yang (Инь янь) lyrics by N. Karimov, муз.Mutabor
13. Almaty (Алма-ата) lyrics by Dolphin, produced by Mutabor
14. Fall up (Падай наверх) lyrics by Dolphin, produced by Mutabor
15. Nudists beach (Нудисткий пляж) lyrics by N. Karimov, produced by Mutabor
16. Last time (Последний раз) lyrics by Dolphin, produced by Mutabor
2004 - Foam (Пена)
1. Rely on us (Положись на нас) lyrics by Mutabor, produced by Mutabor
2. Necessary thing (Необходимая вещь) lyrics by Mutabor, produced by I. Chernikov
3. Resort love affair (Курортный роман) lyrics by a. hohlina, produced by Mutabor
4. It's all love (Вот и вся любовь) lyrics by Mutabor, produced by Mutabor
5. Shake it, baby lyrics by N. Karimov, produced by Mutabor
6. Fast food, fast woman lyrics by N. Karimov, produced by Mutabor
7. Don't turn on the welt (Крутиться не надо на бортике) lyrics by N. Karimov, produced by Mutabor
8. Adult games (Взрослые игры) lyrics by A. Hohlina, produced by I. Chernikov
9. Balkona (Балкона) lyrics by N. Karimov, produced by Mutabor
10. Black hair-rollers (Чёрные бигуди) lyrics by DJ Dan, produced by Mutabor
11. Lyrics #3 (Лирика №3) lyrics by Mutabor, produced by M. Voinov
12. Tomorrow (Завтрашний день) lyrics by Mutabor, produced by Mutabor
13. Bonus for the anus (Бонус в анус) produced by Mutabor
2006 - Weekend
1. Intro
2. About sports (О спорте)
3. Light my fire
4. One more time (Ещё хотя бы раз)
5. Two ends (Два конца)
6. The city moon (Городская луна)
7. Let's go get some wine (Пойдем за вином)
8. From SPB to Moscow (От Питера до Москвы)
9. Nice! (хорошо!)
10. A specific kind of smoke feat. Niyaz (Специфический дым feat. Нияз)
11. Instrumental
12. Banal farewell (Банальная прощальная)

== Style ==
Malchishnik was one of the first artists to openly use explicit lyrics on Russian music scene. Frequent use of obscene language and explicit descriptions of sexual acts provided shock value and attracted listeners raised within conservative and asexual Soviet culture. The lack of modern music equipment in post-Soviet Russia was reflected in the quality of these records. Their post-hiatus albums showcased more professional production.

== Reception ==
Most Russian hip hop fans have always viewed Malchishnik as a pop group. This caused some controversy as to whether Malchishnik should be considered the first Russian rappers or not. With techno and later, house music gaining mainstream popularity in mid-1990s, Russian youth lost interest to hip hop. While 2000s saw the rise of a vivid Russian rap fandom, reunited Malchishnik maintains very limited popularity.
