= Põhjamaade Hirm =

Estonian rapper

- Also known as: Põhjamaade Hirm
- Born: Johan Kullerkup
- Origin: Estonia
- Genres: Hip hop Rap
- Occupations: Rapper, producer
- Years active: 2003-present
- Label: Legendaarne

Johan Kullerkup also known by his stage name Põhjamaade Hirm (English: Nordic Fear) is an Estonian rapper. He won a rap battle contest called "MC Battle" in 2005 which increased his popularity in the Estonian hip hop community. Põhjamaade Hirm is also known for being one half of the rap group Kuuluud with fellow producer Tatmo Savvo. He has also made an album of his own called Maailma Südame Põhjast (From the Heart of the World).

He is signed to Legendaarne Records which is owned by G-Enka and DJ Paul Oja.

== Albums ==
Studio albums

- 2006: Maailma Südame Põhjast
- 2021: Nagu Vaataks Pilvi

With Kuuluud

- 2008: Kummuli kaheksa, üheksanda maailma imelik

With DVPH

- 2013: Mõtted on mujal
- 2014: Natuke veel
