= Ergen =

Ergen is a Turkish surname. Notable people with the surname include:

- Charlie Ergen (born 1953), American businessman
- Gülben Ergen (born 1972), Turkish singer and actress
- Mehmet Ergen, British theatre director, producer, and entrepreneur
