= Juju (Finnish rapper) =

Finnish rapper

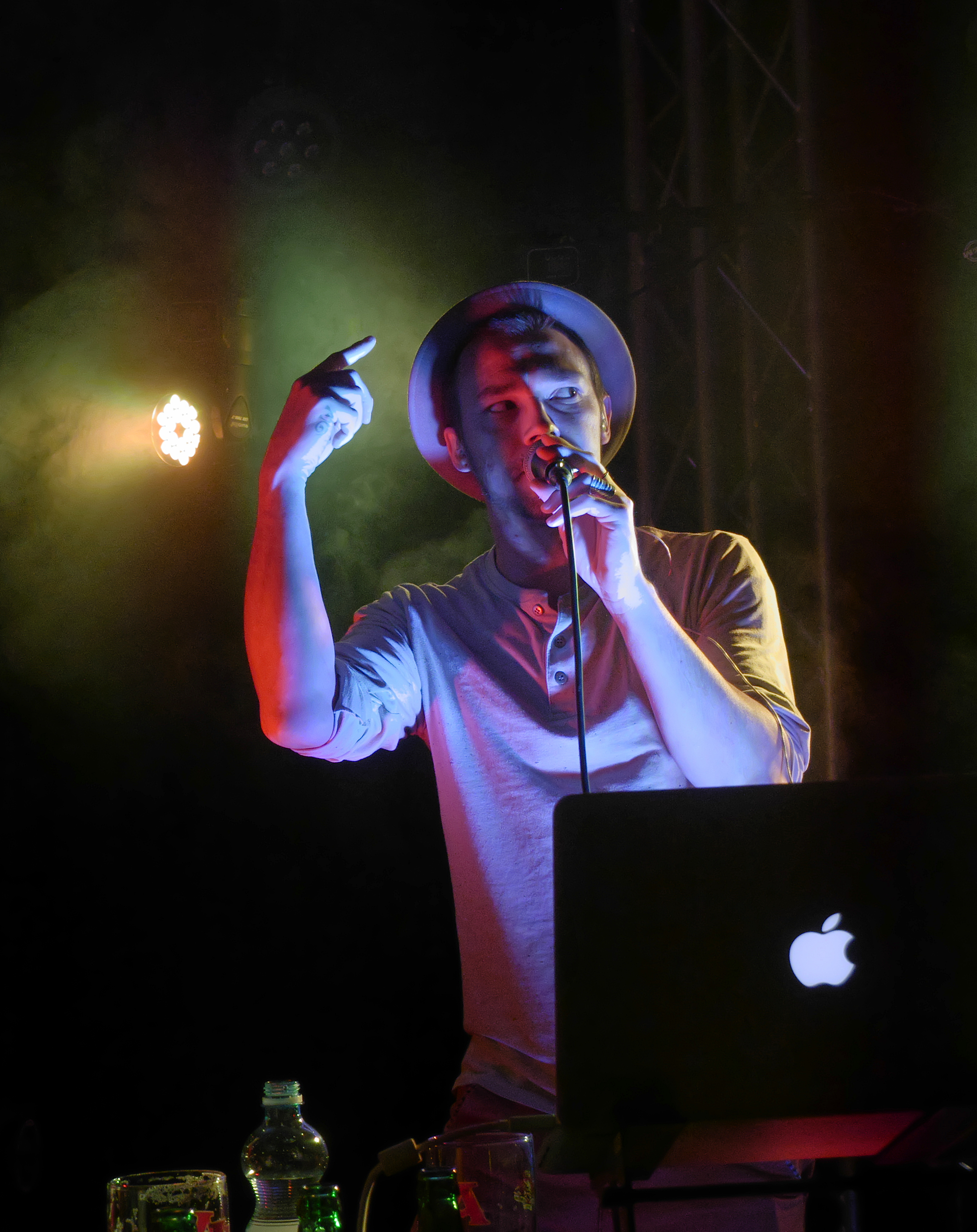
Juju in 2019

Julius Reino Aleksan Sarisalmi, professionally known as Juju, is a Finnish rapper. To date, he has released five solo albums, the latest release being in May 2026. Juju has also appeared as a featured guest on songs by such artists as Julma-Henri, Teflon Brothers and Aste.

== Selected discography ==
=== Solo albums ===
Year	Title	Peak position
Year	Title	FIN
2008	Sekavuudesta selvyyteen	–
2011	Mustavalkosta	–
2013	Matkalla kadotukseen	27
2014	Julius Kivi on hullu	8

=== Singles ===
Year	Title	Peak position	Album
Year	Title	FIN	Album
2014	Onnelliseksi	2	Julius Kivi on hullu
2014	Hullu	3	Julius Kivi on hullu
2026	Maailman onnellisin kansa	-	Maailman onnellisin kansa
