= Zontanoi Nekroi =

Greek rap group

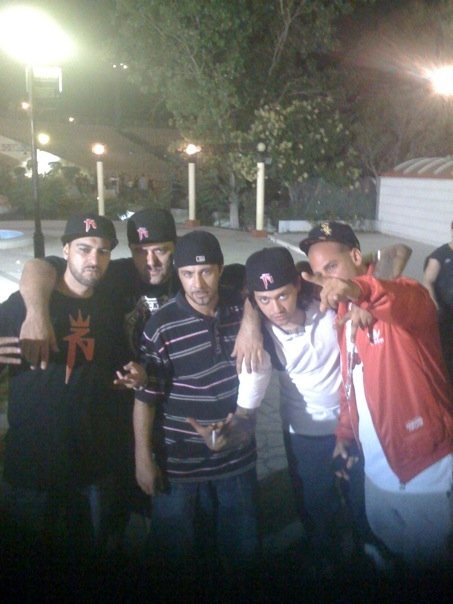
- ZN recording Taki Tsan's new solo album Rima gia Hrima 2

Background information
- Origin: Greece
- Genres: Battle rap, trap, gangsta rap, hardcore hip hop, horrorcore
- Years active: 1997-2003, 2008-2010, 2015
- Labels: Ihokratoria (IhoSpira)/FM Records, Big Fiasco Records, EMI Records
- Members: Taki Tsan, Midenistis, Ypoxthonios, Kataxthonios, Harmanis
- Website: http://www.zitani.de

Zontanoi Nekroi ("Living Dead") was a Greek hip-hop group formed in 1997. Its members were Taki Tsan, Midenistis, Katahthonios, Ypohthonios, and Harmanis.

== Formation ==
At a concert of the hip hop group Terror X Crew in 1997 at the Camel Club–Athens, a police raid took place and almost everybody at the concert (even the band) were taken to the police station of Piraeus. Terror X Crew's DJ ALX's brother, Panagiotis Stravalexis and rapper Panos Bougas met there, and decided to form a hip hop group. The two of them first started as the Gate of the Living Dead. Stravalexis took the pseudonym Timvorihos - Grave Robber (under alias; Taki Tsan) and Bougas took the name Midenistis - Nihilist. Eventually they changed the band's name to Zontanoi Nekroi. Efthimis from Terror X Crew would introduce them to Ipohthonios (Tasos Karakostas) who would be recruited to the group but not before mentioning his younger brother "who raps better than him" Kathahthonios (Lazaros Karakostas). Harmanis (Vasilis Hatzidiakos) who is a childhood friend of Stravalexis would be last one to join after a random re-connection of the two.

== Albums ==
They released the EP ZN Entoles in early 1998, and later that year was their only album O Protos Tomos. After that, Stravalexis changed his alias to Pedi Thavma and released an LP called Rima gia Hrima in 1999. The following albums Kata.R.Ipo, a duet album by Ipohthonios and Katahthonios and Harmanis' debut solo named Sisihaha were expected next but they were never completed. Having collected several songs from those sessions, they released a compilation album named Thammena Ksehasmena which contained songs from Kata.R.Ipo, a song that did not fit in Rima gia Hrima, the first track that was recorded for Megalos Iroas, Midenistis' first solo album, and some alternate editions of old songs. Midenistis LP Megalos Iroas initially delayed was eventually completed and released in 2002. Conflicts arose after that album's release and the group informally disbanded.

In 2008, they formed up again after 5 years and gave some concerts. During one of their concerts, they announced that they are working on Defteros Tomos their second album. ZN continued to work together as they recorded some songs for Taki Tsan's 2009 LP "Rima gia Hrima 2". Defteros Tomos was supposed to be released in 2010 but nothing was seen. The group seemingly discreetly disbanded again to return to their solo pursuits. In September 2014, Taki Tsan publicly called out the other members for a reunion which they all accepted and they were expected to record Defteros Tomos. They only though released an EP named Pasa Doumania/Paresthiseis in 2015 as a warm-up but internal conflicts arose again and they disbanded again for good.

The only group activity since then was an attempted live appearance for a festival which made a public invitation to the group which they initially accepted. On the day of the performance though, Taki Tsan and Ipohthonios had a fight and Ipohthonios did not appear in that live with the other four.

== Discography ==
- ZN Entoles/Sti Hora Ton Kaliteron MCs, EP, FM Records/Ihokratoria (1998)
- O Protos Tomos, LP, FM Records/Ihokratoria (1998)
- Thamena Ksehasmena, Compilation, FM Records/Ihokratoria (2001)
- The Rare And Unreleased Songs, Mixtape, Gus Productions (2009)
- The Rare And Unreleased Songs Vol. 2, Mixtape, Gus Productions (2009)
- Pasa Doumania/Paresthisis, EP, Ihokratoria (2015)

== Solo discography ==
- Stin Athina, CD Single, FM Records/Ihokratoria (1999) by Taki Tsan (as Pedi Thavma)
- Rima Gia Hrima, LP, FM Records/Ihokratoria (1999) by Taki Tsan (as Pedi Thavma)
- Megalos Iroas, LP, FM Records/Ihokratoria (2002) by Midenistis
- Stihi San Fotia, CD, FM Records (2004) by Midenistis
- Siatista, Mixtape, No Label (2004) by Ipohthonios
- Mixtape Vol.0, Mixtape, hiphop.gr (2005) by Taki Tsan
- Mixtape Vol.1, Mixtape, newstyle.gr (2005) by Taki Tsan
- Mixtape Vol.2: Misa Lefta/Dipli Maggia, Mixtape, IhoSpira (2005) by Taki Tsan
- To Pedi Tou Dromou, Mixtape, No label (2005) by Ipohthonios
- Sto Mialo Tou Panagioti Stravaleksi, LP, IhoSpira/FM Records (2006) by Taki Tsan
- Kane Ntou, Single, Minos EMI (2007) by Ipohthonios
- Pion Akous, CD, Minos EMI (2008) by Ipohthonios
- To Kalitero Deal, Single, Minos EMI (2008) by Katahthonios
- KommaTia Laska, Mixtape, No label (2008) by Harmanis
- 50/50, CD, Minos EMI (2008) by Midenistis
- In' O Man, CD, Sporty Magazine (2009) by Taki Tsan
- Kommatia Harma, Mixtape, No Label (2009) by Harmanis
- Uno, Single, No Label (2009) by Ipohthonios
- Rima gia Hrima 2, 2 CD's, Ihokratoria/RAP Monster (2009) by Taki Tsan
- Vromiko, Mixtape, No Label (2010) by Ipohthonios
- Exclusive Mixtape, Mixtape, takitsan.com (2011) by Taki Tsan
- Athens' Finest, Mixtape, takitsan.com (2011) by Taki Tsan
- To Mialo Mou Girnaei, Single, Spicy Records (2011) by Ipohthonios
- Mia Zografia, Single, Panik Records (2011) by Midenistis with Demy
- Vrehi Fragga, Mixtape, Capital Music (2012) by Ipohthonios
- To Party Den Stamata, Single, Panik Records (2012) by Midenistis with Eleni Foureira
- Zo Ti Stigmi, Single, Panik Records (2012) by Midenistis
- Kala Koritsia, Single, Panik Records (2012) by Midenistis
- Se Ena Tiho, Single, Panik Records (2012) by Midenistis with Michalis Hadjiyiannis
- Prodotis, Single, Capital Music (2013) by Ipohthonios
- Oli Mazi, Single, Panik Records (2013) by Midenistis
- S Agapao, Single, Panik Records (2013) by Midenistis with Tamta
- Etos 2013, Single, Panik Records (2013) by Midenistis
- To Sistima, EP, Ihokratoria/33 1/3 Entertainment (2014) by Taki Tsan
- Se Ena Aggelo Milo, Single, Panik Records (2014) by Midenistis with Yiannis Vardis
- Panik Boys, Single, Panik Records (2014) by Midenistis with Snik
- Ta Kalitera, Single, Panik Records (2014) by Midenistis with Kostas Martakis
- Colombiano, Single, Capital Music (2015) by Ipohthonios
- Pacman, Single, Capital Music (2015) by Ipohthonios
- To Poto, Single, Panik Records (2015) by Midenistis
- Zoo, Single, Panik Records (2015) by Midenistis
- Maradona, Single, Capital Music (2016) by Ipohthonios
- Ola Auta Pou Tha Thela, Single, No Label (2016) by Midenistis
- Eho / Ta Sporia Mas, Single, No Label (2016) by Midenistis
- Allos Enas, Single, Athens Mob Records (2016) by Taki Tsan with Rack
- Ipopta, Single, Athens Mob Records (2016) by Taki Tsan
- Tzogadoros, Single, Athens Mob Records (2016) by Taki Tsan
- Allazo Styl, Single, Athens Mob Records (2017) by Taki Tsan
- Demos 4 Memos, Mixtape, Athens Mob Records (2017) by Taki Tsan (as DJ Westley)
- Peru, Single, Capital Music (2017) by Ipohthonios
- Eleni Vitali, Single, Capital Music (2017) by Ipohthonios
- Logia Alithina, Single, Athens Mob Records (2017) by Taki Tsan

== Other projects ==
- Theoria Kai Praxi, LP, FM Records/Ihokratoria (2003) by Tigre Sporakia (Taki Tsan & Isvoleas)
- To Sholio, LP, FM Records/Ihokratoria (2004) by Harmanis & Taki Tsan
- Sta Paidia, Single, No Label (2009) by Taki Tsan & Diezel
- High Oso Den Paei, Single, Polla Kila Entertainment (2010) by Harmanis & Billy Sio with Taki Tsan
- To Styl Mou, Single, Polla Kila Entertainment (2011) by Harmanis & Billy Sio
- Onoma Kai Pragma, LP, No Label (2011) by Tigre Sporakia (Taki Tsan & Isvoleas)
- Trilogia, EP, Capital Music (2013) by Ipohthonios & Skive
- Thelei Na Dineis Tin Psihi Sou Gi Auto, Single, Ihokratoria (2013) by Taki Tsan & Kebzer
- Alli Fasi, Single, Ihokratoria (2013) by Taki Tsan & Kebzer
- Den Einai Anagki, Single, Ihokratoria (2014) by Taki Tsan & Kanon
- Skame Sta Mavra, Single, RNS Records (2016) by Taki Tsan & Thitis
