= Murat & Jose =

Slovene hip hop duo

Murat & Jose are a Slovene hip hop duo of writers, producers and MC. Both were born in 1978 in Ljubljana, Slovenia where they still live. Together with Nikolovski they performed for some time under the name Nedotakljivi (EN: The Untouchables). Together they published one of their first releases on the first Slovene hip hop compilation 5'00" of Fame za narodov blagor (EN: 5'00" of Fame for the National Welfare).

Their first solo LP was V besedi je moč (EN:The power is in the word) from 2002. The album featured some contributions from other artists: Tomi M, singer of Slovene rock group Siddharta, appeared on socially conscious single "Od ljudi za ljudi" (EN: "From people for people"); Zagreb duo Bolesna brača on the song "Na izi" (EN: "On easy goin'"); Semo, a vocalist from Kočevje, featured on reggae-Balkan-soul track "Če hočem" ("If I want") and "Dokler bova skupi" ("As long as we're together"). Nikolovski collaborated on "Neki ne štima" ("Something's wrong") and on "V besedi je moč". "Kdo je gengsta" ("Who's the Gangsta") features Kemal Trofi & Jozafat. Unusually for a Slovene hip-hop album, V besedi je moč does not include any swearing, regional, sexual, or between-band provocations, claims of illegal behaviour, or drug references.

Murat & Jose have shared the stage with Das Efx, Afu-Ra, Little Brother and many other internationally known hip-hop acts. Alongside Heavy Les Wanted they also appeared at Slovenia's first urban festival Breakbeatnikk.

Murat & Jose formed a live band in 2007 and are now performing under the name Murat & Jose Band. They recorded a fully live album with the band, entitled Tuki Not released in September 2008. Its first single "Nazaj" (Back) featured Slovene rock and soul singer Janez Bončina, who rose to fame in the mid seventies. The second single, Be your own, featured local soul singer Maya.

== See also ==
- Music of Slovenia
