= Klemen Klemen =

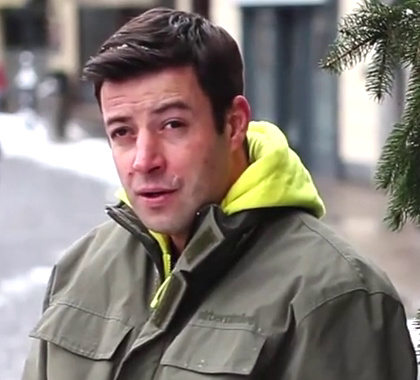
Klemen Klemen in 2014

Klemen Klemen is a Slovenian rap music artist. He started rapping when he was 13, first in English. In 2000, he was signed by Nika Records, and released the rap album - Trnow Stajl. In 2003, he released his second album called Hipnoza (Hypnosis). In 2015, he released his third album S3p.
