= Arta Bajrami =

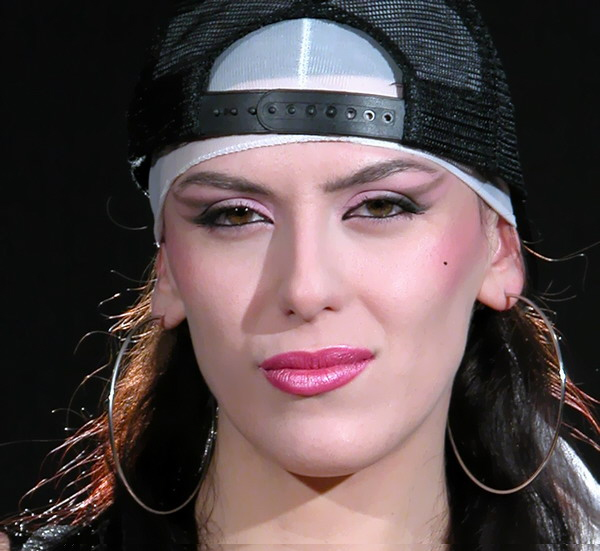

Background information
- Born: 9 January 1980 (age 46); Pristina, SR Serbia, SFR Yugoslavia (now Kosovo)
- Occupations: Singer; songwriter
- Years active: 1999–present

Arta Bajrami (born 9 January 1980) is a Kosovan singer and songwriter. Born and raised in Pristina, she has been referred to as the "Albanian Queen of R&B" and is noted for her versatility in music and performance. She is ethnically Albanian.

== Life and career ==
Bajrami was born on 9 January 1980 into an Albanian family in the city of Pristina, then part of the Yugoslavia, present Kosovo. She is popular among the young Albanian audience in Albania, Kosovo, Montenegro and North Macedonia. She has had the fortune of winning several music prizes in various Albanian music contests. She got married in 2009.

Bajrami grew up in a family where music was just as important as the daily food (Arta's father Zejnullah Bajrami was a famous Kosovar rapsode). In a family of four, Arta's mother is the only member without a professional music background. Bajrami's younger brother Artan, known as Don Arbas in showbusiness, is an Albanian songwriter and producer. He runs Arbasound, a company known for producing many great songs by Albanian performers.
