= Sido discography =

Rapper discography

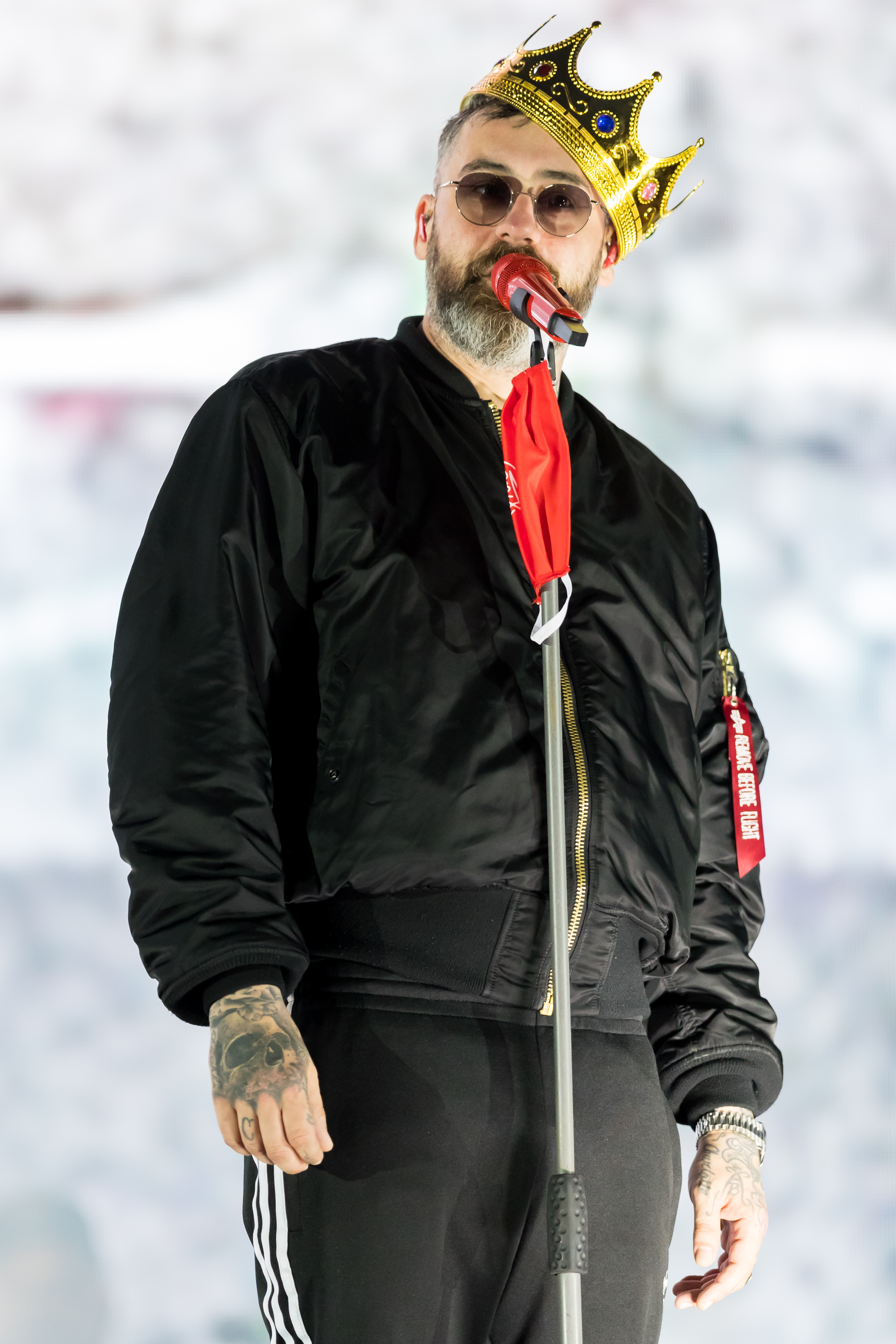
- Studio albums: 8
- Live albums: 1
- Compilation albums: 12
- Singles: 44
- Music videos: 42
- Collaborative albums: 5

This is the discography of Sido, a German rapper from Berlin.

== Albums ==
=== Studio albums ===
Title	Album details	Peak chart positions				Sales	Certifications
Title	Album details	GER		AUT	SWI	Sales	Certifications
Title	Album details	Top 100	Hip hop	AUT	SWI	Sales	Certifications
Maske	Released: 24 April 2004; Label: Aggro Berlin; Format: CD	3	*	46	79		BVMI: Gold
Ich	Released: 1 December 2006; Label: Aggro Berlin; Format: CD	4	*	21	18		BVMI: Gold
Ich und meine Maske	Released: 30 May 2008; Label: Aggro Berlin; Format: CD	1	*	2	2		BVMI: Platinum; IFPI AUT: Gold; IFPI SWI: Platinum
Aggro Berlin	Released: 30 October 2009; Label: Urban; Format: CD	5	*	5	3	GER: 34,013 (Note: Sales of Aggro Berlin in Germany as of December 2009)	BVMI: Gold
30-11-80	Released: 29 November 2013; Label: Urban; Format: CD	1	*	2	1		BVMI: Platinum; IFPI AUT: Platinum; IFPI SWI: Gold
VI	Released: 4 September 2015; Label: Urban, Goldzweig; Format: CD	3	1	2	1		BVMI: Gold; IFPI AUT: Gold; IFPI SWI: Gold
Das goldene Album	Released: 18 November 2016; Label: Urban, Goldzweig; Format: CD	2	1	3	2		BVMI: Gold
Ich & keine Maske	Released: 27 September 2019; Label: Universal Music; Formats: CD, digital download, streaming, box set	1	—	1	2		BVMI: Gold
Paul	Released: 9 December 2022; Label: Universal Music; Formats: CD, digital download, streaming, box set	1	—	1	1		

=== Live albums ===
Title	Album details	Peak chart positions			Certifications
Title	Album details	GER	AUT	SWI	Certifications
MTV Unplugged Live aus'm MV	Released: 21 May 2010; Label: Urban; Formats: DVD	2	2	7	BVMI: Platinum

=== Compilations ===
Year	Title	Chart positions			Sales	Certifications
Year	Title	GER	AUT	SWI	Sales	Certifications
2002	Aggro Ansage Nr. 1	—	—	—		
2002	Aggro Ansage Nr. 2	—	—	—		
2003	Aggro Ansage Nr. 3	—	—	—		
2004	Aggro Ansage Nr. 4	7	—	—		BVMI: Gold
2005	Aggro Ansage Nr. 5	9	27	—		BVMI: Gold
2007	Eine Hand wäscht die andere	21	29	33		
2007	Sampler 1	18	—	—		
2008	Sampler 2	14	—	—		
2008	Aggro Anti Ansage Nr. 8	25	20	10		
2009	Sampler 3	—	—	—		
2012	#Beste	7	3	20		
2018	Kronjuwelen	4	15	6		

=== Collaborations ===
Year	Title	Chart positions			Sales	Certifications
Year	Title	GER	AUT	SWI	Sales	Certifications
2005	Dein Lieblings Album	2	—	—		
2009	Die Sekte	59	—	71		
2011	23	3	3	1	Austria: 10.000+; Germany: 100,000+	Austria: Gold; Germany: Gold
2011	Blutzbrüdaz – die Mukke zum Film	10	4	16	Austria: 10,000+; Germany: 100,000+	Austria: Gold; Germany: Gold
2017	Royal Bunker	1	1	2		

Royal TS / A.i.d.S.

- 1998: Wissen ~ Flow ~ Talent
- 2000: Back in Dissniss
- 2001: Das Mic und Ich (EP)
- 2002: Alles ist die Sekte Album Nr. 3
- 2003: Gar nich so schlimm! (EP)

Die Sekte

- 1999: Sintflows
- 2009: Die Sekte – Christmas Edition

== Singles ==
=== Solo singles ===
Year	Title	Chart positions			Notes
Year	Title	GER	AUT	SWI	Notes
2004	Mein Block; Maske	13	61	—	
2004	Fuffies im Club; Maske	18	—	—	
2004	Arschficksong; Aggro Ansage Nr. 1	61	—	—	
2005	Mama ist stolz Maske	25	—	—	
2005	Geblendet vom Licht; Blinded by the Lights	63	—	—	feat. Shizoe
2005	Steh wieder auf Dein Lieblingsalbum	14	—	—	feat. Harris
2006	Wahlkampf; Aggro Ansage Nr. 5	36	33	—	feat. G-Hot
2006	Straßenjunge; Ich	20	25	—	
2006	Weihnachtssong	34	68	—	Re-Release 2007 & 2008
2007	Ein Teil von mir Ich	14	24	46	
2007	Schlechtes Vorbild; Ich	18	30	43	
2008	Augen auf / Halt dein Maul; Ich & meine Maske	7	13	29	
2008	Carmen; Ich & meine Maske	17	18	72	
2008	Herz; Ich & meine Maske	19	19	39	
2009	Nein! (Live); Ich & meine Maske	29	42	—	feat. Doreen
2009	Beweg dein Arsch; Hands on Scooter	17	34	100	Sido's Hands on Scooter feat. Tony D & Kitty Kat
2009	Hey du! Aggro Berlin	4	12	21	
2009	Geburtstag; Aggro Berlin	91	—	—	
2010	Sie bleibt Aggro Berlin	21	18	39	
2010	Der Himmel soll warten MTV Unplugged Live aus'm MV	2	4	28	feat. Adel Tawil
2010	Da Da Da; MTV Unplugged Live aus'm MV	56	62	—	feat. Stephan Remmler
2011	So mach ich es 23	23	32	37	with Bushido
2012	Bilder im Kopf #Beste	5	2	4	
2013	Hier bin ich wieder 30-11-80	—	39	—	
2013	Einer dieser Steine; 30-11-80	4	12	8	feat. Mark Forster
2013	Arbeit; 30-11-80	33	63	—	feat. Helge Schneider
2013	Liebe; 30-11-80	13	10	26	
2013	Maskerade; 30-11-80	56	20	—	feat. Genetikk & Marsimoto
2013	Fühl dich frei 30-11-80	99	—	—	
2015	Ackan; VI	40	38	44	feat. Dillon Cooper
2015	Löwenzahn; VI	67	66	60	feat. Olexesh
2015	Astronaut; VI	1	1	1	feat. Andreas Bourani
2015	Gürtel am Arm; VI	72	—	—	
2015	Zuhause ist die Welt noch in Ordnung; VI	80	—	47	feat. Adel Tawil
2015	Vom Frust der Reichen; VI	91	—	—	
2015	Zu wahr VI	92	—	—	
2015	Für ewig VI	97	—	—	
2015	Wiese vor dem Reichstag	91	—	—	
2016	Hamdullah; Das goldene Album	75	—	—	Prod. by DJ Desue
2016	Ganz unten Das goldene Album	89	—	83	feat. Hanybal
2016	Geuner; Das goldene Album	—	—	—	Prod. by DJ Desue
2016	Papa ist da Das goldene Album	—	—	88	
2016	Ja man Das goldene Album	—	—	—	feat. Estikay
2016	Masafaka; Das goldene Album	34	43	25	feat. Kool Savas
2017	Royal Bunker; Royal Bunker	65	—	83	with Savas
2017	Normale Leute; Royal Bunker	69	—	95	with Savas feat. Marteria
2017	Neue Welt; Royal Bunker	29	48	59	with Savas feat. Lakmann
2017	Haste nich gesehen Royal Bunker	63	—	67	with Savas
2017	Jedes Wort ist Gold wert Royal Bunker	72	—	62	with Savas
2017	Unterschied; Royal Bunker	90	—	—	with Savas
2017	Wenn ich oben bin Royal Bunker	93	—	—	with Savas
2017	Hall of Fame; Royal Bunker	98	—	—	with Savas
2017	Freund / Feind; Royal Bunker	100	—	—	with Savas
2018	Yallah Habibi; The Time Is Now	67	—	36	with DJ Antoine & Moe Phoenix
2018	Tausend Tattoos; Kronjuwelen	2	3	3	
2018	4 Uhr Nachts; Kronjuwelen	25	43	32	featuring Haftbefehl and Kool Savas
2019	Wie Papa; Ich & keine Maske	17	13	18	
2019	Das Buch; Ich & keine Maske	19	16	22	
2019	Melatonin; Ich & keine Maske	19	22	25	featuring Yonii and Beka
2019	Energie; Ich & keine Maske	10	11	22	featuring Luciano
2019	Leben vor dem Tod; Ich & keine Maske	22	34	12	with Monchi
2019	High; Ich & keine Maske	16	22	18	with Kool Savas and Samra
2019	Pyramiden; Ich & keine Maske	38	50	47	with Johannes Oerding
2019	2002; Ich & keine Maske	6	7	5	with Apache 207
2020	Dynamit	81	—	—	with Edin
2020	Lost; Atlantis	36	—	—	with Fler
2020	Dicka was	14	48	43	with Kool Savas and Nessi
2020	Monet	9	29	74	with Alligatoah
2020	Keine Angst (Horrorcamp Song)	73	—	—	with Knossi, Manny Marc and Sascha Hellinger
2020	Schöner Tag	27	49	38	with Gentleman
2021	Mit dir	3	9	12	

=== Featured singles ===
Year	Title	Chart positions			Notes
Year	Title	GER	AUT	SWI	Notes
2006	Sureshot; HyperSexyConscious	34	—	—	(Tomcraft feat. Sido & Tai Jason)
2009	Das System (die kleinen Dinge); Sexismus gegen Rechts	89	—	—	(K.I.Z feat. Sido)
2010	Ne Leiche; Kontrastprogramm	—	—	—	(SDP feat. Sido)
2011	Kein morgen	—	—	—	(Nazar feat. Sido und RAF 3.0)
2011	Ick liebe Dir	33	50	—	(Mario Barth feat. Sido)
2012	Die Nacht von Freitag auf Montag; Die bekannteste unbekannte Band der Welt	—	—	—	(SDP feat. Sido)
2013	Immer immer mehr NWA	—	62	—	(Shindy feat. Bushido & Sido)
2013	Aschenflug; Lieder	18	33	41	(Adel Tawil feat. Prinz Pi & Sido)
2014	Au revoir Bauch und Kopf	2	2	6	(Mark Forster feat. Sido)
2014	Gheddo Reloaded; Deutscher Traum	74	—	—	(Eko Fresh feat. Sido)
2016	Triumph; Essahdamus	28	28	31	(Kool Savas feat. Sido, Azad & Adesse)
2017	Blau; Karussell	30	—	—	(Amanda feat. Sido)
2017	110; Ich bin 3 Berliner	100	—	—	(Ufo361 feat. Sido)
2019	Meine 3 minuten	33	51	4	(Freschta Akbarzada feat. Sido)
2020	Woher	9	—	42	(Bozza feat. Sido)

== Guest appearances ==
- 2002: Jede Frau ist eine Plage from Mein Kampf by King Orgasmus One
- 2002: Plan B & Samba from Der Neger (In mir) by B-Tight
- 2002: Armageddon, Gangster Gangster, Männer & Rap Frankenstein from Tag der Abrechnung by King Orgasmus One
- 2003: Renn from Vom Bordstein bis zur Skyline by Bushido
- 2004: Zum Teufel mit den Regeln from Einblick 3
- 2004: Alle wollen cool sein from Neukölln Hustler by MOK
- 2004: Oh Shit Remix from Aggroberlina by Fler
- 2004: Taxi, Taxi from Sparring by Olli Banjo
- 2004: Lauf from Über alles in der Welt by Hecklah & Coch
- 2005: Hände hoch from Epos by Battlerapp
- 2005: Mach dir keinen Kopf from Das Mixtape by MC Bogy
- 2005: 10 Minuten from Shizogenie by Olli Banjo
- 2005: Whisper from The Blue Tape by Plattenpapzt
- 2005: Badesong & Salam Alajkum (Boogie Down Berlin) from Numma Eyns by DJ Tomekk
- 2005: Playboy & Abtörn Görl from Neue Deutsche Welle by Fler
- 2005: Deine Lieblingsrapper from Threeshot by J-Luv
- 2005: Die Sekte from Muzik oder Knast by MOK
- 2006: Willkommen in Berlin Remix & Mein Viertel from F.L.E.R. 90210 by Fler
- 2006: Freundentränen Remix, Der neue Standard & DLR Inferno from Der neue Standard by Beathoavenz
- 2006: Für den Hustler from Bad Boys by MOK
- 2006: Back in the Days from Bad Boys 2 by MOK
- 2006: Königsklasse from Sparring 2 by Olli Banjo
- 2006: So bin ich from Berliner Schnauze by Bass Sultan Hengzt
- 2006: Ruff Sex Part 1 & 2 & Kein Hunger mehr from Nichts ist umsonst by Don Tone
- 2006: Eierlecken from Orgi Pörnchen 4 – Der Soundtrack by King Orgasmus One
- 2006: Verrückt wie krass from Trendsetter by Fler
- 2006: Scheiß auf deinen Club from Blut gegen Blut by Massiv
- 2006: Titten & Popo'z from Aggrogant by G-Hot
- 2007: Was ist Beef?! from Airmax Muzik by Fler
- 2007: Zaster, Zaster from Willkommen in Abschaumcity by MC Bogy
- 2007: Straßenmukke from Straßenmukke by MOK
- 2007: Seelenfrieden from Der Schmetterlingseffekt by Bass Sultan Hengzt
- 2007: 100% Sektenmuzik & Psychose auf Psychose by Grüne Medizin
- 2007: Yes Sir from Retro by Sir Colin
- 2007: Halt dein Maul &Auf und ab from Wir nehmen auch Euro by DJ Sweap & Pfund 500
- 2007: Geld im Portemonee from Ein Level weiter by Greckoe
- 2007: Aggrostarz 2007 from Juice Vol. 100
- 2007: Clubmud from Alles oder nichts by Jom & Said
- 2007: Asozialen Lifestyle from Aus Liebe zum Spiel by Snaga & Pillath
- 2007: Kettenreaktion from GBZ Oholika 3 by Spezializtz
- 2007: Weiterlaufen & Kuck! from Geladen und Entsichert by Alpa Gun
- 2007: Keiner kann was machen from Ghetto Romantik by B-Tight
- 2007: Rockwilder und Clubmud from Harryge Angelegenheit by Harris
- 2007: Auf und ab und Knochen gebrochen from Totalschaden by Tony D
- 2007: Straßenmucke Remix from Hustler by MOK
- 2007: Ich brauch schlaf from 80's Flashback
- 2007: Hör nicht auf from Neger Neger by B-Tight
- 2007: Ich leb meinen Traum from Killatape 2 by Automatikk
- 2008: Chefsache & Therapie from Fremd im eigenen Land by Fler
- 2008: Bevor ich geh from Deutschrap Hooligan by Joe Rilla
- 2008: Das ist Hip Hop from Ecko Unltd. Mixtape Vol. 1
- 2008: Schaukelpferd from Goldständer by B-Tight
- 2008: Ghettopräsident 2 from Jenseits von Eden by Automatikk
- 2008: Swagger like us from Ab in Club by Harris, DJ Sweap & Pfund 500
- 2008: Schlaflos from Südberlin Maskulin by Frank White & Godsilla
- 2008: Der Aufstand from Aufstand auf den billigen Plätzen by Alpa Gun
- 2008: A.i.d.S from Orgi Pörnchen 5 – Der Soundtrack by King Orgasmus One
- 2008: Ein bisschen mehr from Typisch Griechisch by Greckoe
- 2008: Puff Puff from Zwiespalt (Grau) von MC Basstard
- 2008: Lass scheppern & Die Sekte from 2 Chaoten by Fuhrman & Bendt
- 2008: Beste from Zu zweit allein by Marsimoto
- 2009: Fire from Der blonde Türke by G-Hot
- 2009: Du brauchst mich & Aggro Collabo from Check mich aus by Fler
- 2009: Macht und Ruhm from Fler by Fler
- 2009: Für die Sekte & Keine Gegnaz from Für die Gegnaz! by Tony D
- 2009: Das ist die Straße from Der Ghettotraum in Handarbeit by Massiv
- 2009: Straßenmucke 2009 from Most Wanted by MOK
- 2009: Nicht mit mir from Zahltag by Bass Sultan Hengzt
- 2009: Mit dir from Miyo! by Kitty Kat
- 2009: Das System from Sexismus gegen Rechts by K.I.Z
- 2009: Alles tamam from Volume Maximum by Killa Hakan
- 2009: Einlauf from Des rois, des pions et des fous by Stress
- 2009: Bock auf'n Beat from International by Hassan Annouri
- 2010: Sor Bir Bana & Zerbrochenes Glas from Almanci by Alpa Gun
- 2010: Musik ist unser Leben, darum wurden wir Erzieher from Wir sind Freunde und darum machen wir Musik by Hammer & Zirkel
- 2010: Stell dir eine Welt vor… from Der Mann im Haus by Harris
- 2010: Hier spielt die Musik from Mein Hip-Hop, das Business & ich by Greckoe
- 2010: Alles gut from Backpack Inferno by Laas Unltd.
- 2010: Ne Leiche from Kontrastprogramm by SDP
- 2011: Sand bei from Two and a half men EP 2 by Hammer & Zirkel & Liquid Walker
- 2011: Intro (Ein Fall für zwei) from Ein Fall für zwei by DJ Sweap und DJ Pfund 500
- 2012: Wie war das noch mal 2012 from Silber by DCS
- 2012: Braun, grün, lila from Kanackis by Haftbefehl
- 2012: Hol die Nadel raus from Unter die Haut by Lonyen
- 2012: Born to ball from This is me by Cals
- 2012: Faxen mit den Jungs from Roboblokk by Blokkmonsta
- 2012: Cool & Ruhig from Narkose by Nazar
- 2012: Die Nacht von Freitag auf Montag from Die bekannteste unbekannte Band der Welt by SDP
- 2012: Mary Jane from Drinne by B-Tight
- 2012: Das echte Leben from AMYF by Bushido
- 2013: Bombe, Feuer, Benzin by Liquit Walker & Bass Sultan Hengzt
- 2013: 90 BPM from Unter Wölfen by Liquit Walker
- 2013: Liebs oder lass es from D.N.A. by Genetikk
- 2013: Nackte Gewalt from Ob du willst oder nicht by Sinan G
- 2013: Lieb mich & Soso from Ein bisschen Shizoe by Shizoe
- 2013: Immer immer mehr from NWA by Shindy
- 2013: Guten Morgen (King Remix) from Guten Morgen Single by Eko Fresh
- 2013: Aschenflug from Lieder by Adel Tawil
- 2014: Intro from #hangster by Psaiko.Dino
- 2014: Blockparty (Remix) from Blackbook II by Laas Unltd.
- 2014: Halt Stop from Endlich erwachsen by Bass Sultan Hengzt
- 2014: Job verloren from Dynamit by Olli Banjo
- 2014: Au revoir from Bauch und Kopf by Mark Forster
- 2014: Strom from MB3 by Manuellsen
- 2014: Schüsse in die Luft from Camouflage by Nazar
- 2014: Tattoo from Peace by MC Fitti
- 2014: Gheddo Reloaded from Deutscher Traum by Eko Fresh
- 2014: Saudi Arabi Money Rich (Babo Remix) from Russisch Roulette by Haftbefehl
- 2015: Eazy from Retro by B-Tight
- 2015: Best Day from Crystals by Eskimo Callboy
- 2015: Schwitze im Bugatti from Masta by Olexesh
- 2015: Bobby & Siggi Skit from Alles ist die Säcke by Die Säcke
- 2015: Kein Bock from #Derbe by Denyo
- 2015: Für immer Kind from Für immer Wochenende by Weekend
- 2015: Don't legalize from Achter Tag by Genetikk
- 2015: Kaltes Wasser from Mama by MoTrip
- 2015: Pablo Picasso from Meister der Zeremonie by MC Basstard

== Others and diss tracks ==
- 2003: Mein Block (Beathoavenz Remix) (Juice Exclusive! auf Juice-CD #36)
- 2005: Meine Lieblingsrapper (mit Blumio) (Juice Exclusive! auf der Juice-CD #58)
- 2005: G mein Weg (Juice Exclusive! auf Juice-CD #50)
- 2007: Strassenmucke (mit MOK) (Juice Exclusive! auf Juice-CD #72)
- 2009: Frohe Weihnachten (feat. Alpa Gun) (Disstrack)
- 2010: Henker & Richter (Freetrack)
- 2010: Pistole (feat. Kitty Kat) (Freetrack)
- 2010: 2010 (feat. Haftbefehl) (Freetrack)

== Productions ==
- 2002: Intro, Aggro, Arschficksong & Alles ist die Sekte auf Aggro Ansage Nr. 1 (Sampler)
- 2002: Samba und Plan B auf Der Neger von B-Tight
- 2003: Relax auf Aggro Ansage Nr. 2 (Sampler)
- 2003: Neu!, Safe Sex, Sido und B-Tight, MV, Ich mach das, Garnich so schlimm, Alles oder nix und Outro (zusammen mit Beatight) auf Garnich so schlimm von A.i.d.S
- 2003: Renn auf Vom Bordstein bis zur Skyline von Bushido
- 2004: Ausm Weg, Maske, Mama ist stolz & Knast auf Maske von Sido
- 2004: Aggroberlina (Remix) auf Aggroberlina (Single) von Fler
- 2004: Zum Teufel mit den Regeln von Die Sekte auf Einblick 3
- 2005: Scheiß drauf,Berlin Paris und Freunde auf Heisse Ware von B-Tight & Tony D
- 2005: Te Typy auf Drewnianej Małpy Rock von Don Guralesko
- 2006: Jungs im Viertel auf Papa ist zurück (Single) von Fler
- 2006: Paradies auf Aggro Ansage Nr. 3 X von Aggro Berlin
- 2006: Eier lecken auf Orgi Pörnchen 4 von King Orgasmus
- 2006: Mein Befehl von Alpa Gun auf Das Beste von MOK
- 2007: 2 Chaoten und Krimineller Westberliner auf Sektenmuzik – Der Sampler (Sampler)
- 2007: Big Boss auf Ausländer (Single) von Alpa Gun
- 2007: Anam Icin auf Juice Vol. 75 von Alpa Gun
- 2007: Blaulicht und Die wilden Kerle auf Geladen & Entsichert von Alpa Gun
- 2007: Schmetterlingseffekt (Remix) auf Schmetterlingseffekt (Single) von Bass Sultan Hengzt
- 2007: Klopf Klopf auf Totalschaden von Tony D
- 2008: Der Wendepunkt auf Typisch griechisch von Greckoe
- 2008: Blas mir einen (zusammen mit Djorkaeff & Beatzarre) und Sexy (zusammen mit Djorkaeff, Beatzarre & Beatight) auf Aggro Ansage Nr. 8 von Aggro Berlin
- 2009: Haze auf Die Sekte von Die Sekte

== Videography ==
=== DVDs ===
Cover	Title	Year
	Aggro Ansage Nr. 1 DVD Nr. 1	2001
	Ich DVD	2007
	Sido MTV Unplugged Live aus'm MV	2010

=== Music videos ===
- 2001: Hältst du es aus? (with Die Sekte)
- 2002: Westberlin (Sido & B-Tight)
- 2003: Safe Sex (Sido & B-Tight)
- 2003: Aggro Teil 2 (Sido, Bushido & B-Tight)
- 2003: Weihnachtssong
- 2004: Hände hoch (Gilles K feat. Sido)
- 2004: Steig ein/Mein Block (Beathoavenz Remix)
- 2004: Fuffies im Club (Sido feat. Harris)
- 2004: Aggro Gold/Neue Deutsche Welle/Aggro Teil 4 (Splitvideo) (Sido, Fler & B-Tight)
- 2005: Mama ist stolz
- 2005: Steh wieder auf (Sido & Harris)
- 2005: Gib mir die Flasche (Sido & Harris)
- 2005: Wir bewahren die Haltung (Sido & Harris)
- 2005: Wahlkampf (Sido & G-Hot)
- 2006: Straßenjunge
- 2006: Sureshot (Tomcraft feat. Sido & Tai Jason)
- 2007: Was ist Beef (Fler feat. Sido & Alpa Gun)
- 2007: Ein Teil von mir
- 2007: Schlechtes Vorbild
- 2007: Kettenreaktion (Spezializtz feat. Sido)
- 2007: Wir reißen den Club ab (Hecklah & Coch feat. Sido)
- 2007: Keiner kann was machen (B-Tight feat. Sido, Fler & Tony D)
- 2008: So machen wir das (Sido, Alpa Gun & Greckoe)
- 2008: Augen auf
- 2008: Halt dein Maul
- 2008: Carmen
- 2008: Herz
- 2008: Ghettopräsident (Automatikk feat. Sido, Bass Sultan Hengzt & Alpa Gun)
- 2008: Hundert Metaz/5 krasse Rapper/So is es (Splitvideo) (Sido, Fler, B-Tight, Tony D & Kitty Kat)
- 2009: Geht nicht, gibts nicht (feat. Alpa Gun)
- 2009: Beweg dein Arsch (feat. Tony D und Kitty Kat)
- 2009: Das System (die kleinen Dinge) (K.I.Z feat. Sido)
- 2009: Hey du
- 2009: Hollywood
- 2009: Geburtstag
- 2009: Rockstarz (with Die Sekte)
- 2010: Der Tanz (with K.I.Z)
- 2010: Sie bleibt
- 2010: Der Himmel soll warten (feat. Adel Tawil)
- 2010: Da Da Da (feat. Stephan Remmler)
- 2010: 2010 (feat. Haftbefehl)
- 2011: Kein morgen (feat. Nazar & RAF 3.0)
- 2011: So mach ich es (with Bushido)
- 2011: Erwachsen sein (with Bushido feat. Peter Maffay)
- 2011: Geboren um frei zu sein (with Rio Reiser)

== Record certifications ==
Gold record

- Germany
  - 2004: for the album Album Maske
  - 2004: for the sampler Aggro Ansage Nr. 4
  - 2005: for the sampler Aggro Ansage Nr. 5
  - 2006: for the album Ich
  - 2011: for the album Ich und meine Maske
  - 2012: for the album 23
  - 2013: for the single "Der Himmel soll warten"
- Austria
  - 2008: for the album Ich und meine Maske
  - 2011: for the album 23
  - 2012: for the album Blutzbrüdaz – die Mukke zum Film
- Switzerland
  - 2008: for the album "Ich und meine Maske"

Platinum record

- Switzerland
  - 2009: for the album Ich und meine Maske

Country	Gold	Platinum
Germany	7	0
Austria	3	0
Switzerland	1	1
total	11	1
