= Ich und meine Maske =

German hip hop album

Studio album by Sido
- Released: 30 May 2008
- Genre: German hip-hop
- Length: 64:12 (standard); 103:34 (premium edition)
- Label: Aggro Berlin
- Producer: Paul NZA, Djorkaeff, H. Stoll, E. Ökmen, Scooter, C. Bauss, DJ Desue and Marek Pompetzki

Sido chronology
Ich (2006)	Ich und meine Maske (2008)	Aggro Berlin (2009)

Singles from Ich und meine Maske
- 1. "Augen auf/Halt dein Maul" Released: 16 May 2008; 2. "Carmen" Released: 25 July 2008; 3. "Herz" Released: 3 October 2008; 4. "Nein!" Released: 30 January 2009; 5. "Beweg dein Arsch" Released: February 2009

Professional ratings
Review scores
Source	Rating
AllMusic	4/5 stars
laut.de	2/5 stars

Ich und meine Maske ("Me and my mask") is the third solo album by German rapper Sido. It was released on 30 May 2008 on his label Aggro Berlin. The style is, according to Sido, a mix between his two last albums, Maske and Ich.

The album climbed to first place in the German chart and to second place in the Swiss and Austrian Charts. It reached platinum status in Switzerland and gold status in Austria.

== Guest appearances ==
The album had many guest appearance of Sido's label mates Fler, Kitty Kat, Tony D and B-Tight. Sektenmuzik members Alpa Gun and Greckoe had there guest parts on "Schule", as well as Die Sekte on the track "Meine Gang". Rapper Harris, and one half of German hip hop duo Deine Lieblings Rapper, is featured on Tage, along with Pillath, one half of duo Snaga & Pillath.

The Premium Edition features a remix of "Halt dein Maul", with additional vocals of Kitty Kat, Willi Murda and rap duo Automatikk. The track "Ich bin so Gaga" featured Bass Sultan Hengzt.

Other artists including Doreen Steinert, Mario Barth, Joe Rilla and Azad are featured on the album. Azad, who was a former rival of Sido, had recorded with him the track "Pack schlägt sich", for showing that they officially had ended their feud. German techno band Scooter produced the song "Beweg dein Arsch", that samples their "Move Your Ass!".

"Augen auf", the album's first single, was the 72nd-best-selling single of 2008 in Germany.

== Track list ==
CD 1
1. Intro – 1:02
2. Wieder zurück ("Back again")– 3:49
3. Halt dein Maul ("Shut up")– 3:21
4. Peilerman und Flow Teil 5 – 1:09
5. Ich und meine Maske ("Me and my mask") – 3:59
6. Pack schlägt sich ("Scum beating each other" feat. Azad) – 3:10
7. Peilerman und Flow Teil 6 – 0:54
8. Augen auf ("Open your eyes")– 3:50
9. Herz ("Heart")– 4:27
10. Peilerman & Flow Teil 7 – 0:43
11. Strip für mich ("Strip for me" feat. Kitty Kat) – 4:21
12. Carmen – 3:46
13. Peilerman und Flow Teil 8 – 0:37
14. Scheiß drauf ("Fuck it") – 4:24
15. Unser Leben ("Our life" feat. Fler und Shizoe) – 4:31
16. Nein! ("No" feat. Doreen) – 4:03
17. Schule ("School" feat. Alpa Gun und Greckoe) – 3:50
18. Jeder kriegt, was er verdient ("Everyone gets what he deserves" feat. Tony D)– 2:45
19. Danke ("Thanks" – 4:46
20. Aggrokalypse (feat. B-Tight, Fler und Kitty Kat)– 4:31
CD 2 (premium edition)
1. Mario Barth Intro (feat. Mario Barth) – 1:36
2. Ich bin so Gaga ("I am so gaga" feat. Bass Sultan Hengzt) – 4:12
3. Tage ("Days" feat. Harris und Pillath) – 4:58
4. Beweg dein Arsch ("Move your ass" feat. Scooter, Kitty Kat und Tony D) – 3:28
5. Wenn die Bosse reden ("When the bosses talk" feat. B-Tight) – 4:50
6. Ich und meine Katze ("Me and my cat" feat. Kitty Kat)– 3:25
7. Deine Eltern ("Your parents" – 4:38
8. Kanacks & Hools ("Immigrants & Hooligans" feat. Joe Rilla) – 4:45
9. Meine Gang ("My gang" feat. Die Sekte) – 4:01
10. Halt dein Maul Remix ("Shut up Remix" feat. Kitty Kat, Willi Murda und Automatikk) – 3:21

== Charts ==
=== Weekly charts ===
Chart (2008)	Peak position
Austrian Albums (Ö3 Austria)	2
German Albums (Offizielle Top 100)	1
Swiss Albums (Schweizer Hitparade)	2

=== Year-end charts ===
Chart (2008)	Position
Austrian Albums (Ö3 Austria)	29
German Albums (Offizielle Top 100)	26
Swiss Albums (Schweizer Hitparade)	27
