= Aggro Berlin (album) =

German hip hop album

Studio album by Sido
- Released: 2009
- Genre: German hip hop
- Label: Urban (Universal)

Sido chronology
Ich und meine Maske (2008)	Aggro Berlin (2009)	23 (2011)

Professional ratings
Review scores
Source	Rating
laut.de	3/5 stars

Aggro Berlin is the fourth studio album by German rapper Sido. It was released on 30 October 2009 via Urban (Universal).

== Track listing ==
No.	Title	Producer(s)	Length
1.	"Intro"		1:28
2.	"Sido"	Paul NZA & Marek Pompetzki	4:40
3.	"Hey du" ("Hey You")	Beatzarre & Djorkaeff	4:12
4.	"Geburtstag" ("Birthday")	DJ Desue	4:48
5.	"Skit 1"		0:28
6.	"Der Tanz" ("The Dance" feat. K.I.Z)	Paul NZA & Marek Pompetzki	3:30
7.	"Wenn das alles ist" ("If That's All" feat. J-Luv)	DJ Desue	4:05
8.	"Marie & Jana"	Paul NZA & Marek Pompetzki	3:59
9.	"Skit 2"		0:24
10.	"Ich bereue nichts" ("I Regret Nothing")	Beatzarre & Djorkaeff	3:56
11.	"Sicher?" ("Sure?")	m3&Noyd	3:26
12.	"Skit 3"		0:44
13.	"Seniorenstatus" ("Senior Status" feat. Samy Deluxe)	Paul NZA & Marek Pompetzki	4:05
14.	"Siggy & Harry" (feat. Harris)	Beatgees	4:17
15.	"Ruf mich" ("Call Me" feat. Kitty Kat & Bintia)	Beatzarre & Djorkaeff	3:54
16.	"Schlampen von gestern" ("Bitches from Yesterday" feat. Doreen Steinert)	Paul NZA & Marek Pompetzki	4:28
17.	"Skit 4"		0:59
18.	"Sie bleibt" ("She Stays")	Beatzarre & Djorkaeff	4:07
19.	"Für Jeden" ("For Everyone" feat. B-Tight & Alpa Gun)	m3&Noyd	4:02
20.	"10 Jahre" ("10 Years" feat. Die Sekte)	Beste Beatz	3:49
21.	"Outro / Seniorenstatus (Remix)" (hidden track)		0:05 (4:43)
22.	"Bodyguard"	DJ Desue	4:16

== Charts ==
=== Weekly charts ===
Chart (2009)	Peak position
Austrian Albums (Ö3 Austria)	5
German Albums (Offizielle Top 100)	5
Swiss Albums (Schweizer Hitparade)	3

=== Year-end charts ===
Chart (2009)	Position
Swiss Albums (Schweizer Hitparade)	88
