= Ich (album) =

German hip hop album

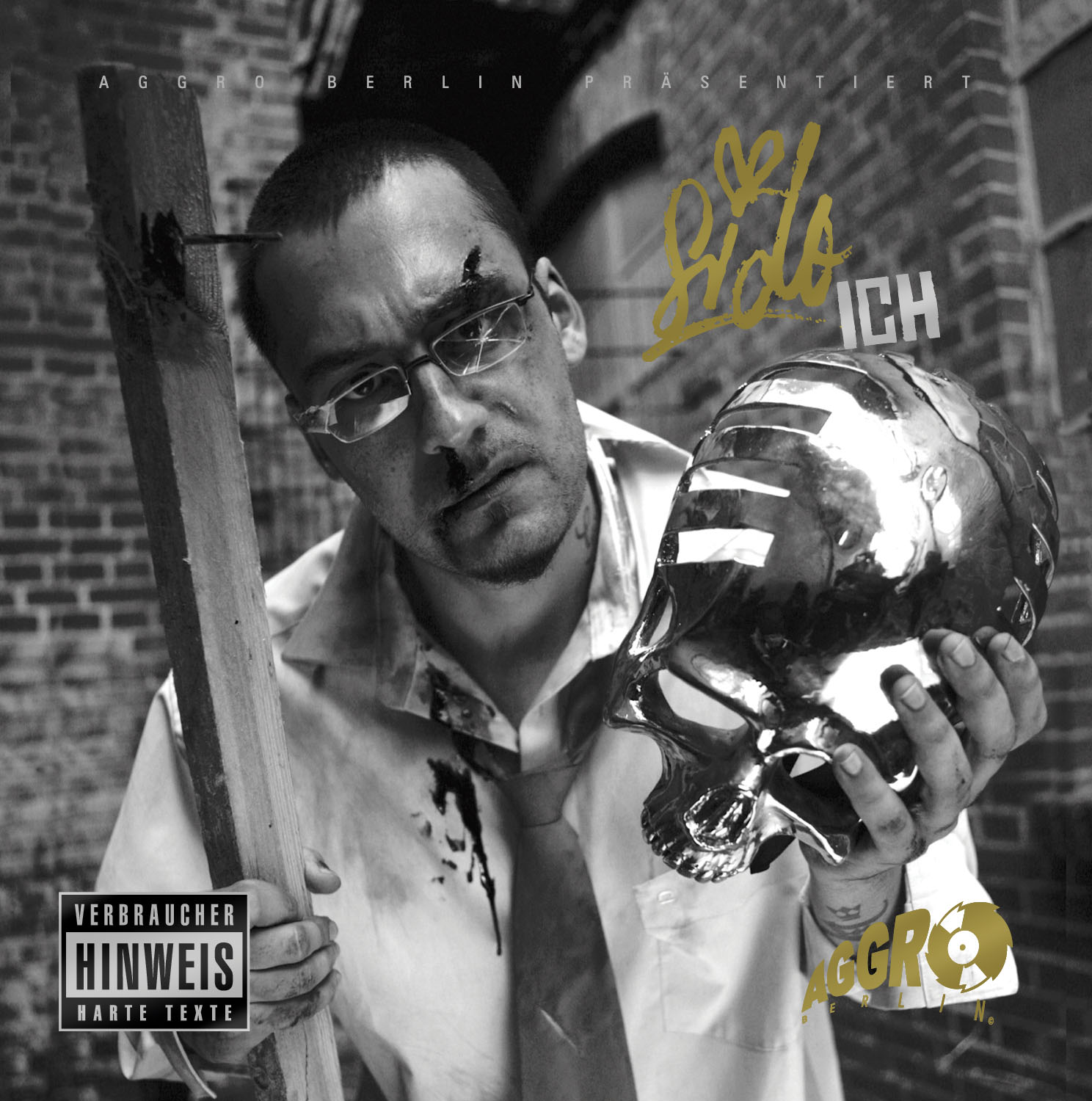

Studio album by Sido
- Released: 1 December 2006
- Genres: Hip-hop, gangsta rap
- Length: 65:23
- Label: Aggro Berlin
- Producers: Paul NZA, Tai Jason, Beathoavenz, Peter Fox, DJ Desue

Sido chronology
Maske (2004)	Ich (2006)	Ich und meine Maske (2008)

Premium edition cover
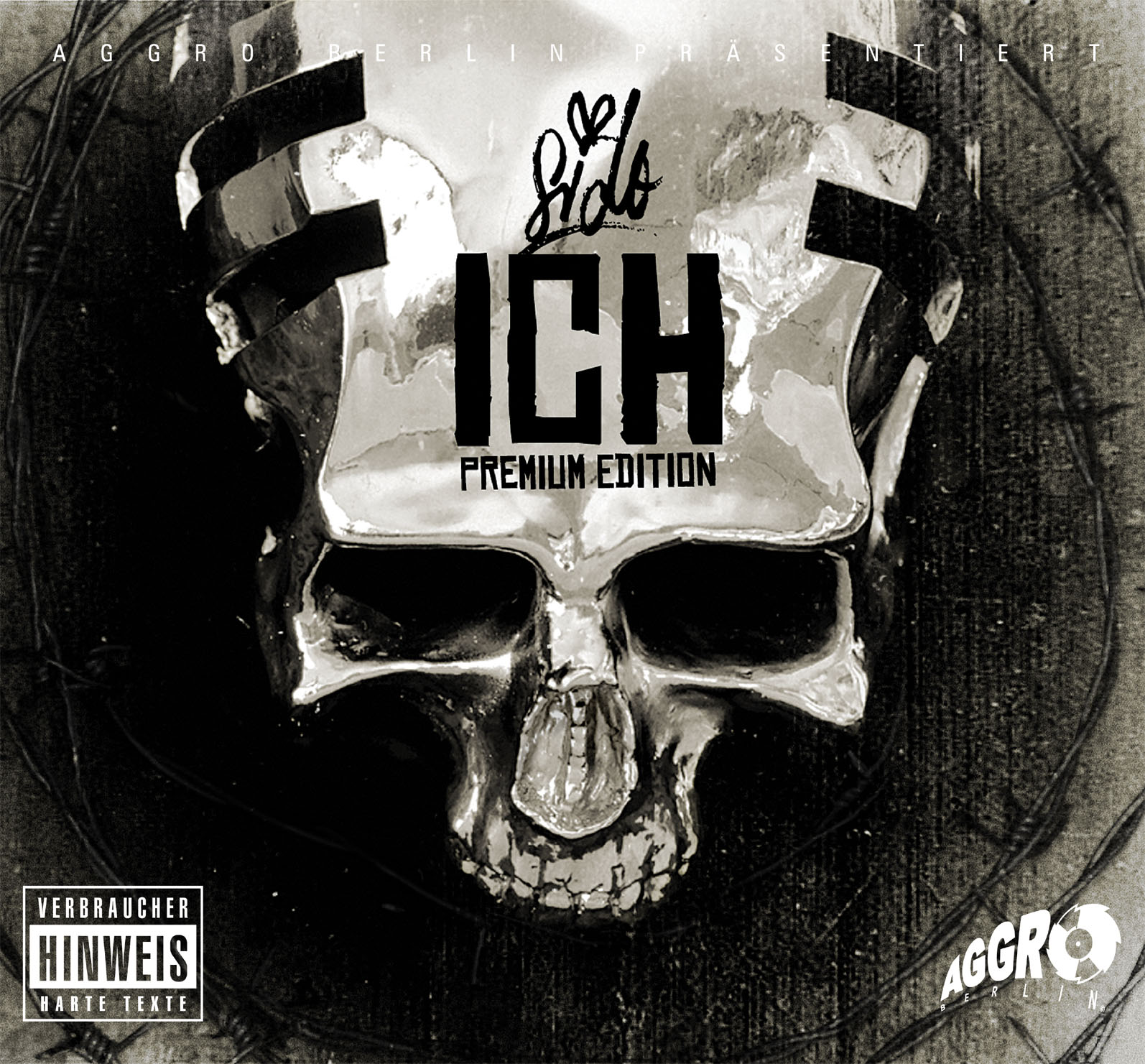

Singles from Ich
- 1. "Strassenjunge" Released: 24 November 2006; 2. "Ein Teil von mir" Released: 2 February 2007; 3. "Schlechtes Vorbild" Released: 1 July 2007

Professional ratings
Review scores
Source	Rating
AllMusic	3.5/5 stars
laut.de	4/5 stars

Ich (German for "I" or "Me") is the second studio album by German rapper Sido. After two weeks of release (on 4 December 2006), it reached gold status. The album climbed to number 4 in the albums chart.

== Track listing ==
No.	Title	Producer(s)	Length
1.	"Intro"		0:37
2.	"Goldjunge" (Gold Boy)	Paul NZA & Kilian	4:12
3.	"Strassenjunge" (Street Boy - feat. Alpa Gun)	Tai Jason	3:54
4.	"Peilerman & Flow Teil 1" (skit)		0:42
5.	"Schlechtes Vorbild" (Bad Role Model)	Paul NZA & M.Pompetzki	3:24
6.	"Ihr habt uns so gemacht" (You Made Us Like This - feat. Massiv)	Paul NZA & M.Pompetzki	5:16
7.	"Mach keine Faxen" (Don't Cause Trouble - feat. Kitty Kat)	Paul NZA & M.Pompetzki	4:07
8.	"Bergab" (Downhill)	Paul NZA & M.Pompetzki	4:44
9.	"Ein Teil von mir" (A Part of Me)	Paul NZA & M.Pompetzki	3:33
10.	"Nie wieder" (Never Again - feat. G-Hot)	Roe Bardie	3:46
11.	"Peilerman & Flow Teil 2" (skit)		0:08
12.	"Ich kiff nicht mehr" (I'm Not Smoking Weed Anymore)	Tai Jason	2:16
13.	"1000 Fragen" (1000 Questions)	Tai Jason	3:35
14.	"Ich hasse dich" (I Hate You)	Beathoavenz	4:32
15.	"Peilerman & Flow Teil 3" (skit)		0:24
16.	"GZSZ" (Gute Zeiten, schlechte Zeiten; meaning Good Times, Bad Times - feat. Fler)	DJ Desue	3:41
17.	"Mein Testament" (My Testament)	Paul NZA & M.Pompetzki	4:19
18.	"Ficken" (Fucking - feat. Tony D & Kitty Kat)	DJ Desue	4:00
19.	"Rodeo" (feat. Peter Fox of Seeed)	Rudeboy & Peter Fox	3:14
20.	"Sarah"	Paul NZA & M.Pompetzki	1:56
21.	"Peilerman & Flow Teil 4" (skit)		0:45
22.	"A.i.d.S. 2007" (feat. B-Tight)	Paul NZA & M.Pompetzki	2:18

Premium edition
No.	Title	Producer(s)	Length
1.	"Wir haben noch Zeit" (We Have Still Time - feat. B-Tight)	Tai Jason	4:58
2.	"Jeden Tag Wochenende" (Every Day Weekend - feat. Bass Sultan Hengzt)	Beathoavenz	4:10
3.	"Hau ab!" (Fuck Off!)	Tai Jason	1:57
4.	"Ich bin ein Rapper" (I'm a Rapper - feat. Harris & Alpa Gun)	DJ Desue	3:30
5.	"Get ya Paper" (feat. Smif-N-Wessun & B-Tight)	Tai Jason	4:49
6.	"Bergab" (Remix feat. B-Tight, Kitty Kat, Alpa Gun & G-Hot)	Paul NZA & M.Pompetzki	5:11

Premium edition video footage
No.	Title	Length
1.	"Interview mit Sido" (Video)	9:59
2.	"Video clip 'Strassenjunge'" (Video)	3:35
3.	"Making of 'Strassenjunge'" (Video)	8:34

Uncredited samples

- "Goldjunge" contains a sample of "Tightrope" by Electric Light Orchestra
- "Schlechtes Vorbild" contains a sample of "Hold the Line" by Toto
- "1000 Fragen" contains a sample of "Warum?" by Tic Tac Toe
- "Ficken" contains a sample of "GoldenEye" by Tina Turner
- "Wir haben noch Zeit" contains a sample of "Crazy Train" by Ozzy Osbourne and "Hip-Hop" by Dead Prez

== Year-end charts ==
Year	Country	Chart	Rank
2005	Germany	IFPI	#61
