= Trendsetter (Fler album) =

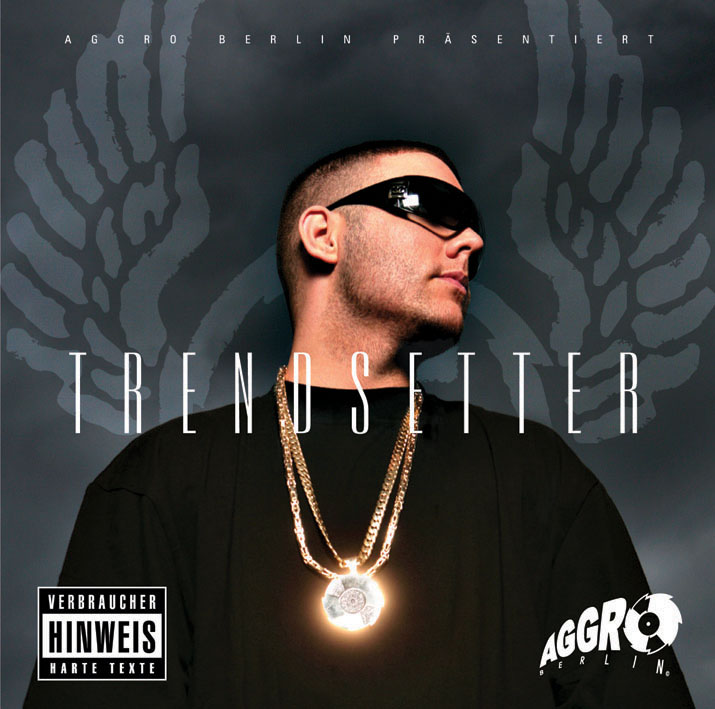

Studio album by Fler
- Released: 23 June 2006
- Genre: German hip-hop
- Label: Aggro Berlin
- Producers: DJ Desue, Don Tone and others

Fler chronology
'Neue Deutsche Welle' (2005)	Trendsetter (2006)	Airmax Muzik (2007)

Trendsetter is the second solo studio album by Fler. It released the 23 June 2006 over Berlin label Aggro Berlin and reached No.4 on the German album charts.

A Premium Edition released with bonus CD and a DVD, that features interviews, concerts of backstage reports of Fler. Appearance of Sido, Tony D, Juelz Santana and others, who commenting their relationship with him.

== Background ==
Four music videos were produced for the songs "Papa ist zurück", "Çüs Junge", "Chef (Clip & Klar)" and "Wir bleiben stehen". The video to "Chef (Clip & Klar)" wasn't shown on MTV and Viva because of its portrayed hardness on the afternoon program, however, it was shown on the night program.

== Track listing ==
No.	Title	Length
1.	"Pacino Intro"	0:57
2.	"Papa ist zurück" (Daddy is back again)	3:10
3.	"Der Guteste" (The good one, featuring G-Hot)	3:54
4.	"Ich bleib’ wie ich bin" (I stay who I am)	4:28
5.	"Die Schule brennt" (The school burns)	3:36
6.	"A.G.G.R.O. Gee"	3:22
7.	"Ich scheine" (I shine)	3:22
8.	"Vatermorgana" (Father morgana)	3:57
9.	"Am Abzug" (In the trigger, featuring Deso Dog)	4:30
10.	"Breakdance" (featuring G-Hot)	4:31
11.	"Nick bis dein Genick bricht" (Nod until your neck breaks, featuring Tony D)	3:52
12.	"Meine Homies" (My homies)	3:49
13.	"Skit"	0:36
14.	"Backstage Pass" (featuring B-Tight & Alpa Gun)	3:47
15.	"Zeit ist Geld" (Time is money, featuring Bass Sultan Hengzt)	3:53
16.	"Reich so reich" (Rich so rich)	3:59
17.	"Çüs Junge" (Whoa, boy, featuring Muhabbet)	3:14
18.	"Böser Engel" (Bad angel)	4:08
19.	"Verrückt wie krass" (Crazy as wicked, featuring Sido)	4:08

Premium edition
No.	Title	Length
1.	"Gangzta Mucke" (Gangzta music, featuring Juelz Santana)	3:13
2.	"Meine Gang" (My gang)	3:01
3.	"Der Chef (Clip & Klar)" (The boss (point-blank))	3:29
4.	"Wir bleiben stehen" (We stand still, featuring Shizoe)	4:22

DVD
No.	Title	Length
1.	"Intro"
2.	"Papa ist zurück"
3.	"Trendsetter Features"
4.	"Hip Hop – Die Rettung" (Hip Hop - The rescue)
5.	"Fler Backstage"
6.	"Neue Deutsche Welle"
7.	"Fler Live"
8.	"Meine Homies" (My homies)
9.	"Prost!" (Cheers!)
10.	"Papa ist zurück" (Video)
11.	"Papa ist zurück" (Making Of)
12.	"Cüs Junge" (Video)
13.	"Cüs Junge" (Making Of)
14.	"NDW 2005" (Video)
15.	"Papa ist zurück" (B-Boy Version)

Samples

- "Wir bleiben stehen" contains a sample of "Dönence" by Baris Manco

Notes

- "Gangzta Mucke" replaced the song "Die Schule brennt", on the Premium Edition.
