= Blutzbrüdaz =

2011 film

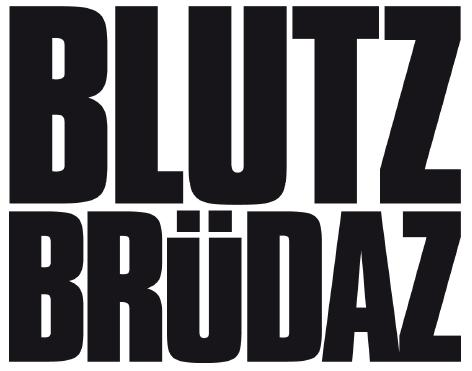
- Directed by: Özgür Yildirim
- Written by: Nicholas J. Schofield; Jan Ehler
- Produced by: Fatih Akin; Oliver Berben; Klaus Maeck
- Starring: Sido; B-Tight; Milton Welsh
- Cinematography: Matthias Bolliger
- Edited by: Sebastian Thümler
- Music by: Sido; B-Tight
- Distributed by: Constantin Film
- Release date: 29 December 2011 (Germany)
- Running time: 95 minutes
- Country: Germany
- Language: German

Blutzbrüdaz is a 2011 German musical film, directed by German-Turkish Özgür Yildirim. The film was nominated at the 2012 New Faces Awards in Germany.

== Plot ==
Otis and Eddy are a pair of friends that share a passion of rapping. One night, as they can't get into a club, the two break through the window, although are soon after caught. Together, they wait before the club, getting into conversation with organizer Fusco. He shows himself impressed by their skills, however, to get into contract, wants to hear a demotape. The two end up working with DJ Desue, who clarifies that while their rhyming and flow works out, the rap parts seem a little lukewarm. Realizing that it's the fault of their mediocre microphone, they attempt to get a new one. After Otis borrows a bit of money from his girlfriend Suzy, his criminal friend Adal invites Eddy and him to a party, where they get to talk to the Sony promoter Facher, as well his assistant Jasmin. The two suggest that Otis and Eddy should rap in English. Adel then helps the two get a new microphone, which he plans to steal with them.

After the first recording sessions, the tapes sell extremely well in Facher's record store, causing Otis and Eddy to refer to themselves as the Blutzbrüdaz. Fusco ends up being their manager and as they are performing in Braunschweig, Facher offers them a major label contract. Despite Fusco's worries and because of Eddy, they accept the contract. The first single under Sony, however, is given major changes - the two are convinced of a sung hook and when the single finally releases, it turns out that Otis' rhymes were replaced by Eddy's. Otis starts to worry if this decision was good after all, but for now decides to accept it. At a television show, the two are said to perform only Eddy's song, instead of the intended two. After the group was renamed to Eddy and the Blutzbrüdaz, Otis cuts ties with Eddy and nearly attacks Facher, only to be stopped by Jasmin. Suzy then tells him to leave and in a fit of rage, he breaks his foot.

Seeing no other option, Otis borrows a large sum of money from Adal, who then becomes Otis' manager. Together with Fusco, they get a proper recording studio, where Otis begins to write songs about the lost friendship with Eddy. He, alongside Adal and Fusco, start a huge campaign, pasting over already existing posters that promote Eddy's debut record. Soon enough, Adal gets into a car crash and as the other driver calls the police, he tells Otis to run away with the cocaine that he stored in his car, but Otis refuses. Adal then demands his money back from Otis, to pay for the lost drugs, attempting to sabotage his and Fusco's recordings. He steals the mastertape and sells it to Facher, who then goes to present Otis the contract they signed earlier - for two years, each and every song Otis writes belongs to him. In spite, Otis releases every song he wrote under Facher for free. Afterwards, he visits a concert from Eddy, gets onto the stage and raps a diss track that embarrasses Eddy and Facher for good. Eddy then leaves the concert, giving a handshake to Otis as a sign of respect.

== Cast ==
- Sido as Otis
- B-Tight as Eddy
- Milton Welsh as Fusco
- Tim Wilde as Facher
- Florian Renner as Phillip
- Alpa Gun as Adal
- Claudia Eisinger as Jasmin
- Alwara Höfels as Suzy
- DJ Desue as Himself
- Liquit Walker as Marco B.
- Patrice Bouédibéla as MTV Host
- Holger Speckhahn as Just Pop Host

== Development ==
The film was funded by the German Federal Film Board, the German Federal Film Fund, and the Medienboard Berlin-Brandenburg

== Soundtrack ==
The soundtrack Blutzbrüdaz – die Mukke zum Film was released in December 2011.

No.	Title	Writer(s)	Length
1.	"Hol Doch Die Polizei"	Sido	2:43
2.	"Mund Auf"	Sido	2:28
3.	"An's Meer"	Sido	2:28
4.	"Arbeitsamt"	Sido	3:18
5.	"Blutzbrüdaz"	Alpa Gun	3:11
6.	"Make Room"	Erick Sermon	2:38
7.	"Spring Rauf"	Sido	3:31
8.	"Tageslicht"	Sido	3:44
9.	"Bis Zur Sonne"	Sido	4:31
10.	"Geboren Um Frei Zu Sein"	Sido	3:42
11.	"Bruda Hin Bruda Her"	Haftbefehl	2:50
12.	"Immer Tiefer In Den Dreck"	MoTrip	3:34
13.	"Das Leben Ist Ein Arschloch"	Sido	3:34
14.	"Das Bin Ich"	B-Tight	2:13
15.	"Ich Rappe 2012"	B-Tight	2:44
16.	"Jippie Jey"	B-Tight	3:58
