= D-Irie =

- Born: Denis Quist; 1981 (age 44–45); Berlin, Germany
- Genres: Gangsta rap, Hip-hop
- Occupation: Rapper
- Years active: 2001-present
- Label: Shok-Muzik

Denis Quist, better known as D-Irie (born 1981) is a German rapper who gained recognition in the autumn of 2006 with his single "Was jetzt los!?!" ("What up now!?!"). He is signed to the hip-hop label Shok-Muzik.

He is known for his diss tracks against various German rappers, such as Sido, Azad, Massiv and Kool Savas.

== Biography ==
D-Irie was born to his father, a Ghana reggae artist, and his German mother. After his father was imprisoned, D-Irie grew up alone with his mother. He was arrested for attempting to break into a shop, but was too young to be tried as an adult.

He began his rap career in 2001, after he met the Berlin rapper Big Sal and the break dancer Crazy B., who encouraged him for his talent. When they founded their Berlin-Wedding music label Shok-Muzik in 2004, they signed D-Irie and he appeared on the label's compilations. In August 2005, he released the album Doppeltes Risiko with label mate Crackaveli.

In 2006, D-Irie released his first single, "Was jetzt los!?!", which was also included in his debut album, Live Dabei, released in February 2007. The single was promoted by Warner Music Group. After the release of the music video in October 2006, it reached #1 in MTV's public charts. The song caused controversy for dissing Aggro Berlin. In early 2007, Fler responded on his mixtape Airmax Muzik with the tracks "Pop-Muzik" and "Das is los!". The latter features Alpa Gun, who released two more diss tracks, "Ich bin am Zug" and "Schluss mit U(n)fuk", dissing rapper Ufuk Sahin of Shok Muzik.

== Discography ==
=== Studio albums ===
| Year | Album details | Peak chart positions | |
| Year | Album details | GER | AUT |
|---|---|---|---|
| 2007 | Live dabei: Released: February 2007; Label: Shok Muzik; Format: CD | | |

=== Compilation albums ===
| Year | Album details |
|---|---|
| 2004 | Was los: Shok Muzik album; Released: 2004; Format: CD |
| 2005 | Doppeltes Risiko: Collabo album with Crackaveli; Released: 2005; Format: CD |
| 2006 | Gangster Rap: Shok Muzik album; Released: 2006; Format: CD |
| 2008 | Schach Matt: Shok Muzik album; Released: 2008; Format: CD |

=== Mixtapes ===
| Year | Album details |
|---|---|
| 2004 | Halbwelt Anonym Mixtape I: Released: 2004; Format: |
| 2008 | Halbwelt Anonym II: Released: 2008; Format: CD |

=== Singles ===
| Year | Title | Chart Positions | | Album |
| Year | Title | GER | AUT | Album |
|---|---|---|---|---|
| 2004 | "Was Los" | | | |
| 2005 | "Leise reiselt der Schnee" | | | |
| 2005 | "Nur Die Starken" | | | |
| 2006 | "Gangster Rap" | | | |
| 2006 | "Was jetzt los!?!" | 49 | | Live dabei |
| 2007 | "Ich Bin Anders" | | | |

== Other release ==
| Year | Title | Info(s) | Format |
|---|---|---|---|
| 2004 | "Was Los" (Video Remix) | Internet Exclusive | Music video |
| 2005 | "Nur die Starken" (with Crackaveli) | Internet Exclusive | Music video |
| 2005 | "Der Angriff" (with Ufuk Sahin) | Diss vs. Bushido, Kool Savas, Azad, Aggro Berlin and others | |
| 2006 | "Ich Bin anders" | Juice Exclusive | Juice CD #68 |
| 2006 | "Juice Exclusive" | Juice Exclusive | Juice CD #71 |
| 2006 | "Der Angriff Part 2" (feat. Ufuk Sahin) | Diss vs. Fler, Bass Sultan Hengzt, Alpa Gun & Massiv | |
| 2006 | "Ist mir egal" | Diss vs. Aggro Berlin, MC Bogy, Kool Savas, Eko Fresh, Bushido & Curse | |
| 2007 | "Das Ist Gangsta" (with Crackaveli, Ufuk Sahin & Baba Kaan) | Internet Exclusive | Music video |
| 2007 | "Ich Bin anders" | Internet Exclusive | Music video |
