= Beweg dein Arsch =

Beweg dein Arsch may refer to:

- Beweg dein Arsch (LaFee song), 2007
- Beweg dein Arsch (Sido song), 2008
