= Diri =

Diri may refer to:

- Diri language, a language of Nigeria
- Douye Diri (born 1959), Nigerian politician
- Margaret Baba Diri (1954–2025), Ugandan politician
- Diri Baba, religious leader to whom the Diri Baba Mausoleum is dedicated

== See also ==
- Dirie
