= Neue Deutsche Welle (album) =

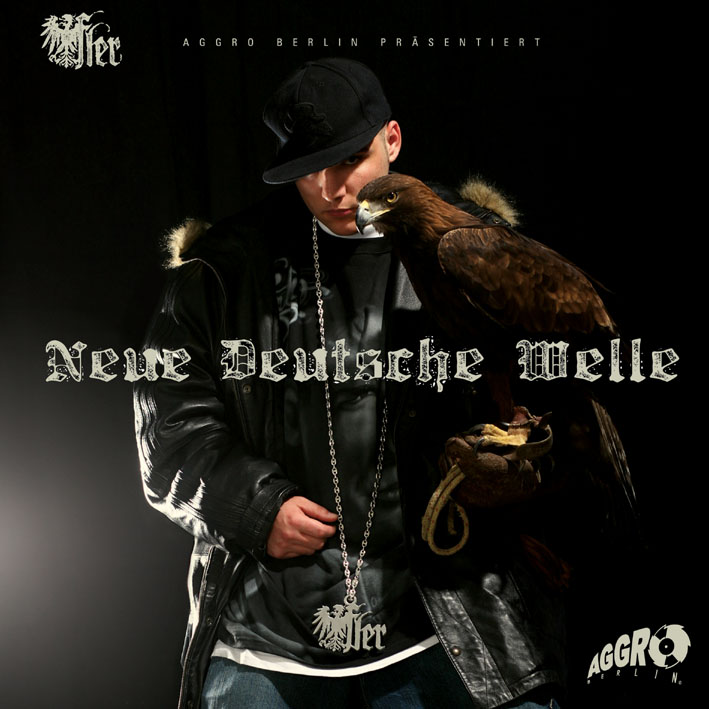

Studio album by Fler
- Released: 2 May 2005
- Genre: German hip-hop
- Label: Aggro Berlin
- Producers: Beathoavenz, Paul NZA & Kilian, DJ Shusta, DJ Desue, Don Tone, Tai Jason, Loggarizm, Fuego

Fler chronology
Carlo Cokxxx Nutten (2002)	Neue Deutsche Welle (2005)	Trendsetter (2006)

Neue Deutsche Welle ("New German Wave"; see Neue Deutsche Welle) is the debut solo album by German rapper Fler, released on 2 May 2005. The album is accused of having nationalist views, because of his lyrics in songs like "Neue Deutsche Welle", such as: "Das ist schwarz, rot, gold – hart und stolz" ("This is black, red, gold – hard and proud"). The "black, red, and gold" refers to the colors of the German flag.

== Controversy ==
Fler has been accused of nationalist views because of the album's lyrics: "[...] This is black, red, gold – hard and proud, nobody noticed it, but believe me my mom is German [...]".

The critics also accused him of using a Adolf Hitler quotation, a reference to the 1939 invasion of Poland. Original from Hitler: "Since 5.45 we have been shooting back". Fler's publicity: "On the 1st of May I will be shooting back".

On 17 June 2005, rapper and label mate Sido said on German TV channel VIVA that neither Fler nor anybody else is a Nazi at Aggro Berlin. Bushido on the other hand, a former member of the label, claimed that it was more than "just marketing":

"It wasn't just Aggro. Fler did it on his own, as a reaction. All his friends are damn proud of being Arabs or Turks. So Fler presented himself as a proud German. […] I don't want to use my Tunesian father as an alibi, and of course friends of mine have played with Nazi references, most recently Fler, but if you use the Reichsflagge as part of your logo and ride around with skinheads in your video then you can't be surprised at this sort of reaction. I have always distanced myself from that kind of shit."

Fler defended himself, saying he dislikes Nazis:

- "I beat Nazis [...]" (from "A.G.G.R.O.")
- "I'm not a Nazi, I'm a German with identity"
- "If Nazis would rap, believe me, they all were already dead / You want to fuck somebody now? Fuck the NPD!"

== Track listing ==
No.	Title	Producer(s)	Length
1.	"Papa ist da (Intro)" (Daddy's here)	Paul NZA & Kilian	3:27
2.	"A.G.G.R.O." (featuring Tony D & B-Tight)	DJ Desue	3:46
3.	"Jackpot"	Paul NZA & Kilian	2:59
4.	"Skit"		0:17
5.	"NDW 2005"	Paul NZA & Kilian	3:51
6.	"Was?!" (What?!)	DJ Shusta	4:33
7.	"F.L.E.R."	Beathoavenz	3:52
8.	"20:15" (featuring G-Hot)	Paul NZA & Kilian	3:05
9.	"Skit"		0:08
10.	"Playboy" (featuring Sido)	Don Tone	3:50
11.	"Bitte Bitte" (Please, please)	Beathoavenz	3:36
12.	"Eine Bombe du liegst" (One bomb and you're dead, featuring G-Hot)	Don Tone	3:47
13.	"BÄNG BÄNG"	Fuego	3:48
14.	"Willkommen in Berlin" (Welcome in Berlin, featuring Megaloh)	Tai Jason	3:57
15.	"Ein Mann, ein Wort" (A man, a word)	Paul NZA & Kilian	3:55
16.	"Skit"		1:20
17.	"Abtörn Görl" (Turn-off girl, featuring Deine Lieblings Rapper)	Paul NZA & Kilian	3:54
18.	"Alles wird gut" (Everything will be fine, featuring G-Hot)	Loggarizm	4:04
19.	"Neue Deutsche Welle 2004" (featuring Shizoe)	Fuego	3:35
20.	"Schwererziehbar 2005" (Difficult to educate 2005)	Fuego	4:01

Premium edition
No.	Title	Producer(s)	Length
19.	"Nach eigenen Regeln" (By my own rules, featuring G-Hot)	DJ Desue	3:56
20.	"Mentalität" (Mentality)	Beathoavenz	3:36

Samples

- "NDW 2005" contains a sample of "Rock Me Amadeus" by Falco.

== Charts ==
=== Weekly charts ===
Chart (2005)	Peak position
Austrian Albums (Ö3 Austria)	28
German Albums (Offizielle Top 100)	5
Swiss Albums (Schweizer Hitparade)	68

=== Year-end charts ===
Chart (2005)	Position
German Albums (Offizielle Top 100)	73
