= Orhan Gencebay discography =

- Albums: 34
- 78rpms: 3
- 45rpms/EP: 42
- LP/33rpms: 22
- Side projects: 11

This is the discography of Turkish classical music artist Orhan Gencebay. Gencebay's total album sales are close to 65 million copies.

== Albums ==
| Year | Album | Sales |
|---|---|---|
| 1971 | Musalla Taşı | |
| 1972 | Kaderimin Oyunu | |
| 1972 | Bir Teselli Ver | |
| 1975 | Batsın Bu Dünya | |
| 1976 | Hatasız Kul Olmaz | |
| 1976 | Sarhoşun Biri | |
| 1978 | Benim Dertlerim | |
| 1979 | Yarabbim | |
| 1980 | Aşkı Ben Yaratmadım | |
| 1981 | Ben Topraktan Bir Canım | |
| 1981 | Kördüğüm | |
| 1982 | Bir Damla Mutluluk | |
| 1983 | Leyla ile Mecnun | |
| 1984 | Dil Yarası | |
| 1985 | Beni Biraz Anlasaydın | |
| 1986 | Cennet Gözlüm | |
| 1987 | Akma Gözlerimden | |
| 1988 | Emrin Olur | |
| 1989 | Ya Evde Yoksan • Seni Arıyorum | |
| 1990 | Utan • Dokunma | 600,000 |
| 1991 | Hasret Rüzgarı | 600,000 |
| 1992 | Sende Haklısın | 780,000 |
| 1993 | Hayat Devam Ediyor | 908,000 |
| 1994 | Yalnız Değilsin | 500,000 |
| 1995 | Gönül Dostu | 500,000 |
| 1996 | Kiralık Dünya | 500,000 |
| 1998 | Klasikleri Sizin Seçtikleriniz | 2,150,000 |
| 1999 | Cevap Ver | 500,000 |
| 2001 | Klasikleri Sizin Seçtikleriniz 2 | |
| 2002 | İdeal Aşk • Batsın Bu Dünya (Remix) | |
| 2004 | Yürekten Olsun | 400,000 |
| 2006 | Yargısız İnfaz | 200,000 |
| 2007 | Film Müzikleri | |
| 2010 | Berhudar Ol | |
| 2023 | Maske | |

== 78rpm ==
| Year | |
|---|---|
| 1960 | Meğer Sevmek Pek Yalanmış/Metelik Oyun Havası Columbia Plak, RT573 |
| 1960 | Yare Pazen Seçemedim/Yeni Yolun Düzleri Columbia Plak, RT600 |
| 1960 | Ağla Sazım Ağla/Gurbet Elde Columbia Plak, RT699 |

== 45rpm/EP ==
| Year | |
|---|---|
| 1965 | Meğer Sevmek Pek Yalanmış/Metelik Oyun Havası Columbia Plak 573 |
| 1965 | Yare Pazen Seçemedim/Yeni Yolun Düzleri Columbia Plak 600 |
| 1966 | Neredesin Leylam/Felek Gurbete Attın Columbia Plak 669 |
| 1966 | Ağla Sazım Ağla/Gurbet Elde Columbia Plak |
| 1967 | Fidayda-Mor Koyun/Misket-Topaloğlu-Şekeroğlan Ergas Plak 110 Başak Plakçılık |
| 1968 | Ankara Koşması-Urfa Halay Havası/Arabeks Oyun Havası-Trakya Karşılaması Türkofon Plak 8610 |
| 1968 | Gönül Bağlarında/Ağlıyorum Yana Yana Türkofon Plak 8611 |
| 1968 | Yıldız Akşamdan Doğarsın/Urfa Karşılama Havası Türkofon Plak |
| 1968 | Kars Oyun Havası/Karşılama (Arif Sağ ile) Bozkurt Plak |
| 1968 | Süpürgesi Yoncadan/Kars Oyun Havası (Arif Sağ ile) Bayşu Plakçılık |
| 1968 | Konya Kabak Havası/Süpürgesi Yoncadan (Arif Sağ ile) Bayşu Plakçılık |
| 1968 | Dönüyorum Sana (Selma)/Derdim Dünyadan Büyük Topkapı Plakçılık 32 |
| 1968 | Bana Öyle Bakma/Dertlerimi Senden Aldım Topkapı Plakçılık 37 |
| 1968 | Başa Gelen Çekilirmiş/Sensiz Bahar Geçmiyor Moda Plakçılık 7 |
| 1968 | Meyhaneci Sırdaşım-Gece Mehtabımsın/Felek Ele Geçmiyor Ki-Kollarında Uyut Beni Topkapı Plakçılık 2 |
| 1969 | Başa Gelen Çekilirmiş/Sensiz Bahar Geçmiyor İstanbul Plak 9131 |
| 1969 | Her Cefa Beni Buldu/Bağrıma Taş Basım İstanbul Plak 9134 |
| 1969 | Sevenler Mesut Olmaz/Beni de Allah Yarattı İstanbul Plak 9150 |
| 1969 | Vicdan Azabı/Ümitsiz Aşk İstanbul Plak 9167 |
| 1971 | Bir Teselli Ver/Yorgun Gözler İstanbul Plak 9175 |
| 1971 | Ben Eski Halimle Daha Mesuttum/Hor Görme Garibi İstanbul Plak 9180 |
| 1971 | Gönül Fırtınası Severek Ayrılalım İstanbul Plak 9187 |
| 1971 | Kaderimin Oyunu/Efkar Bastı Gönlümü İstanbul Plak 9192 |
| 1971 | Tanrıya Feryat/Ümit Şarkısı İstanbul Plak 9203 |
| 1971 | Ben Sevdim de Ne Oldu/Kabahat Seni Sevende İstanbul Plak 9211 |
| 1972 | Aşk Pınarı/Hayat Kavgası İstanbul Plak 9233 |
| 1972 | Sen de Bizdensin/Sev Dedi Gözlerim İstanbul Plak 9251 |
| 1972 | Sen de Bizdensin/Sev Dedi Gözlerim Kervan Plakçılık 1 |
| 1972 | Aşk Pınarı/Hayat Kavgası Kervan Plakçılık 2 |
| 1973 | Benim Dünyam/Sevmiyorum Deme Kervan Plakçılık 36 |
| 1973 | Sen Hayatsın Ben Ömür/Ben Doğarken Ölmüşüm Kervan Plakçılık 55 |
| 1974 | Dertler Benim Olsun/Gönül Kervan Plakçılık 67 |
| 1974 | Boynu Bükük Sevgililer/Uğrunda Bir Ölmek Kaldı Kervan Plakçılık 79 |
| 1975 | Duyun Beni/Aşkımızın Duası Kervan Plakçılık 84 |
| 1975 | Kimi Sarsın Ellerim/Bir Araya Gelemeyiz Kervan Plakçılık 95 |
| 1975 | Batsın Bu Dünya/Sevmenin Zamanı Yok Kervan Plakçılık 102 |
| 1976 | Hatasız Kul Olmaz/Kara Çalı Kervan Plakçılık 109 |
| 1976 | Yaşamak Bu Değil/Beni Böyle Sev Kervan Plakçılık 115 |
| 1976 | Sarhoşun Biri/Kader Diye Diye Kervan Plakçılık 126 |
| 1977 | Bırakın da Yaşayalım/Geri Dön Kervan Plakçılık 137 |
| 1978 | Çikekeş/Doğan Bir Pişman Kervan Plakçılık 153 |
| 1981 | Ben Topraktan Bir Canım/Dönmeyen Yıllar Türküola Plakçılık |

== LP/33rpm ==
| Year | |
|---|---|
| 1971 | Orhan Gencebay İstanbul Plak LP 1 |
| 1972 | Orhan Gencebay İstanbul Plak LP 6 |
| 1974 | Orhan Gencebay Kervan Plak LP 8 |
| 1975 | Batsın Bu Dünya Kervan Plak LP 19 |
| 1976 | Sarhoşun Biri Kervan Plak LP 24 |
| 1978 | Benim Dertlerim Kervan PLak LP 34 |
| 1979 | Yarabbim Kervan Plak LP 41 |
| 1980 | Aşkı Ben Yaratmadım Kervan Plak LP 52 |
| 1981 | Ben Topraktan Bir Canım Kervan Plak LP 62 |
| 1983 | Leylâ ile Mecnun Kervan Plak LP 69 |
| 1984 | Dil Yarası Kervan Plak LP 74 |
| 1985 | Beni Biraz Anlasaydın Kervan Plak LP 78 |
| 1986 | Cennet Gözlüm Kervan Plak LP 84 |
| 1987 | Akma Gözlerimden Kervan Plak LP 86 |
| 1988 | Emrin Olur Kervan Plak LP 90 |

Published in foreign countries

Israel

| Year | |
|---|---|
| 1980 | Orhan Gencebay Koliphone Records LP 1 |

Germany

| Year | |
|---|---|
| 1980 | Kaderimin Oyunu Türküola Plak LP 373 |
| 1980 | Hor Görme Garibi Türküola Plak LP 374 |
| 1982 | Ben Topraktan Bir Canım Türküola Plak LP 7394 |
| 1982 | Yarabbim Türküola Plak LP 7443 |
| 1982 | Aşkı Ben Yaratmadım Türküola Plak LP 7444 |
| 1983 | Leyla ile Mecnun Türküola Plak LP 7453 |

== Other works ==
| Year | |
|---|---|
| 1967 | Kızılırmak-Karakoyun movie soundtrack #Şu Benim Güllerim Soldu (Haberin Alayım Seher Yelinden) #Kerbelâ Çölünden Bir Koyun Geldi (Yürekteki Yaralarım Dağladı) #Yıldız Dağı (Kara Koyun) |
| 1967 | Kozanoğlu movie soundtrack #Kozanoğlu |
| 196? | Halim Haliloğlu: Eşimden Ayrıldım Yoktur Kararım/Antebin Etrafı Gül ile Diken 45rpms, Türkofon Opening instruments by Orhan Gencebay |
| 1970 | Mihrican Bahar: Muhammedin Mezarını Kazan Kimdir 45rpms, Türkofon Plak 6008, 1970 45rpms, Alp Plak, 1970? |
| 1973 | Altın Sesler LP/33rpm, Kervan Plak LP 1 Kervan Plak Artists Karma Album |
| 1975 | Turkey-A Musical Journey LP/33rpm, Ezgi Plak, USA Turkish Classical Music Karma Album |
| 198? | S.S. Müzik Prodüktörleri Temin Tevzi Koop LP, S.S. Müzik Prodüktörleri Temin Tevzi Koop. LP 55 Turkish Classical Music Karma Album |
| 1988 | Yıldızlar Kervanı Kaset, Kervan Kervan Plak Artists Karma Album |
| 2005 | İstanbul Hatırası: Köprüyü Geçmek Cassette & CD, Doublemoon Documentary Soundtrack |
| 2008 | Gel Sen de Katıl Umudun Şarkısına CD, 1 Numara Müzik, 2008 Composed for Hope Foundation for Children with Cancer |
| 2008 | Tarkan: Uyan CD, Hitt Müzik Vocals, bağlama, cura and divan instrument by Orhan Gencebay |
| 2011 | Hülya Şenkul: Aşk Mektupları CD, TFM Müzik #Ben Sana Emanettim (Song: Duymadın Ki, Lyrics, Music and Arrangement: Orhan Gencebay) #Delicem (Song: Bunca Yıl Habersiz, Music and arrangement : Orhan Gencebay) |
