= Mein Block =

Single by Sido

from the album Maske
- Released: 2004
- Genre: German hip hop
- Label: Aggro Berlin

Sido singles chronology
"Mein Block" (2004)	"Fuffies im Club" (2004)

"Mein Block" ("My hood") is a song by German rapper Sido and the first single of his debut album Maske. The single was successful in the German charts and Sido's breakthrough in Germany. The single was in the top 20.

== Background ==
The track is a hymn to his former 'hood' in Berlin and the answer to "Mein Block" by Blumentopf. Beathoavenz produced a remix of the song, which can be heard in the music video and appeared on Aggro Ansage Nr. 3. Other variants and covers have been made, including by Rainer von Vielen.

== Music video ==
In the music video, rapper Tony D appeared for the first time in public and played "the guy with the punch ring".

== Charts ==
=== Weekly charts ===
Chart (2004)	Peak position
Austria (Ö3 Austria Top 40)	61
Germany (GfK)	13

=== Year-end charts ===
Chart (2004)	Position
Germany (Official German Charts)	51
