= Beweg dein Arsch (Sido song) =

Single by Sido feat. Scooter, Kitty Kat & Tony D

from the album Ich und meine Maske
- Released: 2008
- Genre: German hip hop
- Label: Sheffield Tunes
- Songwriter(s): Tony Damager, Kitty Kat, Paul Neumann, Marek Pompetzki, Scooter, Sido

Sido feat. Scooter, Kitty Kat & Tony D singles chronology
"Nein!" (2008)	"Beweg dein Arsch" (2008)	"Das System (die kleinen Dinge)" (2009)

"Beweg dein Arsch" ("Move your ass") is a song by German rapper Sido and the fifth single from the album Ich und meine Maske. It features vocals by Kitty Kat and Tony D.

The band Scooter produced the song and sampled their song "Move Your Ass!".

== Music video ==
The video was shot in Germany in a blue screen studio. Sido, Tony D and Kitty Kat performed their parts, in front of a black and white background.

As well appeared Kitty Kat for the first time in public, who had never showed herself since the release of Aggro Anti Ansage Nr. 8. Scooter appeared also in the video and lead singer H.P. Baxxter is seen at the end, with Sido's mask and took it off.
