= 23 (23 album) =

Rap album

Studio album by 23 (Bushido & Sido)
- Released: 14 October 2011
- Recorded: 2011
- Studios: Beatzarre Studio, Berlin
- Genres: Rap; hip hop
- Length: 52:34 (standard edition); 63:33 (premium edition); 72:59 (deluxe edition)
- Labels: Sony Music; Columbia
- Producers: Bushido; Beatzarre; Djorkaeff; Sido; Paul NZA; DJ Desue

Bushido chronology
Jenseits von Gut und Böse (2011)	23 (2011)	AMYF (2012)

Sido chronology
Aggro Berlin (2009)	23 (2011)

Singles from 23
- 1. "So mach ich es" Released: 30 September 2011; 2. "Erwachsen sein" Released: 25 November 2011

23 is a collaboration album by German rappers Bushido and Sido as "23". It was released on October 14, 2011, in three different editions: standard, premium and deluxe. Combining the releases from both rappers, it was their 23rd release.

== Background ==
Bushido and Sido are successful rappers from Germany. They were former friends who had a fallout in 2004 when Bushido left their label Aggro Berlin as a result of a dispute with its owners and founders. Afterwards, both rappers insulted and dissed each other in public on numerous occasions. In early 2011, they reconciled after an eight-year rivalry and began to work on the album.

== Singles ==
Two songs from the album, "So mach ich es" and "Erwachsen sein" were released as singles. The music video for the first single was shot in Kyiv and directed by Specter, one of the former CEOs of their label Aggro Berlin. The second single features German singer Peter Maffay, who re-sung elements of his 1983 song "Nessaja" from his album Tabaluga oder die Reise zur Vernunft.

== Chart performance and sales ==
Professional ratings
Review scores
Source	Rating
laut.de	3/5 stars

Two days after the announcement on 15 August, the album reached number one on the German Amazon Music and hip hop charts. The album debuted at number 3 on the German Media Control Charts with 36,897 first-week sales, number 3 on the Austrian Charts, and number 1 on the Swiss Charts. Seven weeks after its release, the album reached gold status in Austria for more than 10,000 units sold. In 2012, the album was certified gold with more than 100,000 units sold.

== Track listing ==
No.	Title	Producer(s)	Length
1.	"Intro"		0:58
2.	"Mit nem Lächeln" (With a smile)		3:24
3.	"Und schon wieder" (And once again)		3:20
4.	"So mach ich es" (That's how I do it)	Beatzarre	3:40
5.	"Willy 1" (Skit)		1:03
6.	"Engel links Teufel rechts" (Angel left devil right)		3:55
7.	"Auch wenn es manchmal regnet" (Still when it rains sometime)		3:23
8.	"Erwachsen sein" (To be adult) (featuring Peter Maffay)		4:07
9.	"Bring mich heim" (Bring me home) (featuring J–Luv)		4:11
10.	"Ein Märchen" (A fairytale)		3:49
11.	"Willy 2" (Skit)		0:58
12.	"Haus aus Gold" (House of gold)		3:08
13.	"Schattenseiten" (Shady sides)		3:27
14.	"23"		3:19
15.	"Verriegel deine Tür" (Lock your door)		2:53
16.	"Kopf kaputt" (Head broken)		3:14
17.	"Schöne neue Welt" (Beautiful new world) (featuring Kay One)		3:47

Premium edition
No.	Title	Length
18.	"Gib nicht auf" (Don't give up)	3:24
19.	"Crossroad" (featuring Ajani)	3:58
20.	"Bonny's Ranch"	3:37

The deluxe edition contains a DVD and second disc, which features all the instrumentals.

Deluxe edition
No.	Title	Length
21.	"Wenn ich groß bin" (When I'm grown up)	2:57
22.	"Brille bitte kommen sie" (Glasses please come)	3:48
23.	"Wer bist du denn schon?" (Who are you anyway?)	2:41

DVD (deluxe edition)
No.	Title	Length
1.	"Dokumentation 23"
2.	"Interview"
3.	"Outtakes"

== Charts ==
=== Weekly charts ===
Chart (2011)	Peak position
Austrian Albums (Ö3 Austria)	3
German Albums (Offizielle Top 100)	3
Swiss Albums (Schweizer Hitparade)	1

=== Year-end charts ===
Chart (2011)	Position
Austrian Albums (Ö3 Austria)	44
German Albums (Offizielle Top 100)	40
Swiss Albums (Schweizer Hitparade)	78

== Certifications ==
Region	Certification	Certified units/sales
Austria (IFPI Austria)	Gold	10,000^{*}
Germany (BVMI)	Gold	100,000^{^}
^{*} Sales figures based on certification alone.^{^} Shipments figures based on certification alone.
