= Spezializtz =

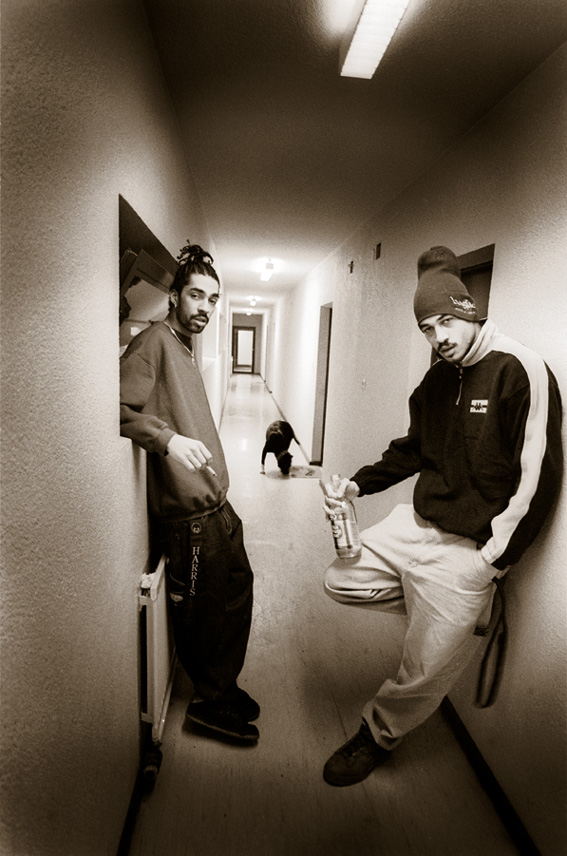
- Harris and Dean

Background information
- Origin: Berlin, Germany
- Genres: German hip hop, Hip hop, Rap
- Years active: 1995 - present
- Label: G.B.Z. Imperium
- Members: Harris; Dean
- Website: www.gbz-imp.de

The Spezializtz are a German hip hop duo from Berlin, Germany, consisting of Oliver Harris and Dean Dawson.

The duo rose to fame through their first album G.B.Z-Oholika, especially the tracks "Kennst ja!" and "Afrokalypse", which featured Afrob, boosted their success. Although the album didn't have a noteworthy impact on the charts, the rappers toured through Germany, Austria and Switzerland, performing with DJ Tomekk among others.

In 1999, the Spezializtz released the single "Nutten" which featured Stuttgart's DJ Thomilla and Hausmarke, and in 2000 the single "T.W.I.N.L.K." ("Tut was Ihr nicht lassen könnt") was a chart hit and subsequently used for several commercials.

After a break, the duo celebrated their 10th anniversary in 2005, and plans for future performances and records were made. The Spezializtz performed at the Splash! festival 2006, toured Germany with Busta Rhymes in April 2007 and are planning to release the third GBZ-Oholika album.

== Discography ==
=== Albums ===
- 1998 - G.B.Z.-Oholika
- 2000 - G.B.Z.-Oholika II
- 2007 - G.B.Z. Oholika III

=== Singles ===
- 1998 - "Babsiflowa"
- 1998 - "Afrokalypse" (featuring Afrob)
- 1998 - "Kennst' Ja" (featuring Flowin Immo)
- 1998 - "Tut Was Ihr Nicht Lassen Könnt"
- 2000 - "Wollt Ihr...?!"
- 2001 - "Krieg" (Vinyl)
- 2007 - "GBGBGBZ"
- 2007 - "Big Babbaz"
- 2007 - "Kettenreaktion" (featuring Sido)
