= Maske =

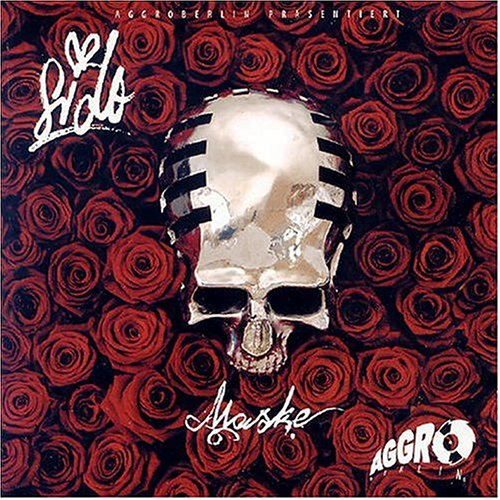

Studio album by Sido
- Released: April 2004
- Genre: German rap, gangsta rap
- Length: 64:01
- Label: Aggro Berlin
- Producer: Headrush, Beathoavenz and others

Sido chronology
Maske (2004)	Ich (2006)

Maske X cover
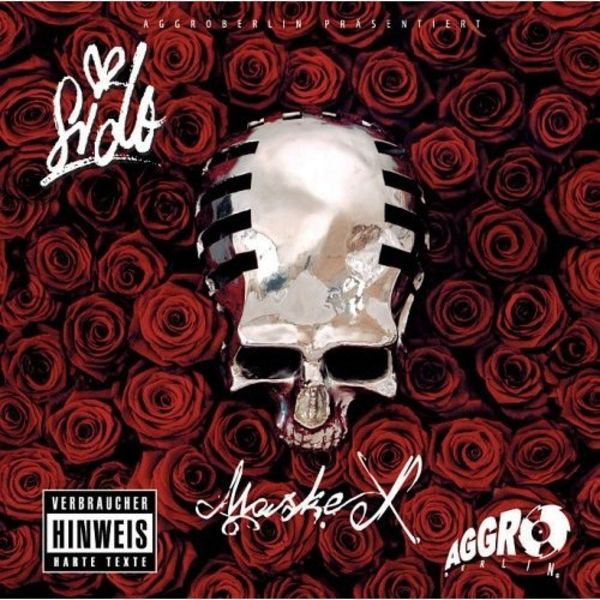

Singles from Maske
- 1. "Mein Block" Released: 19 April 2004; 2. "Fuffies im Club" Released: 28 May 2004; 3. "Mama ist stolz" Released: 2004

Professional ratings
Review scores
Source	Rating
AllMusic	4/5 stars
laut.de	3/5 stars

Maske (German for "Mask") is the debut album by German rapper Sido. It reached gold status and sold over 180,000 CDs to date in Germany.

The song "Mein Block" was already released as a remix on Aggro Ansage Nr. 3 in 2003.

Maske was later banned, so after one year, Sido published the album as an "X-version" without the problematic song "Endlich Wochenende", and added two extra songs.

== Track list ==
No.	Title	Producer(s)	Length
1.	"Interview"	Sido (aka Sido Gold)	2:17
2.	"Aus 'm Weg" (Get out the way)	Sido Gold	4:23
3.	"Steig ein" (Get in)	Roe Beardie	3:37
4.	"Mein Block" (My hood)	Roe Beardie	4:08
5.	"Maske" (Mask)	Sido Gold	3:28
6.	"Mama ist stolz" (Mom is proud)	Sido Gold	4:17
7.	"Sido und die Drogen" (Skit - Sido and the Drugs)		1:37
8.	"Endlich Wochenende" (Finally weekend)	Roe Beardie	3:44
9.	"3 Leben" (3 Lives - feat. Tony D & Mesut)	Beathoavenz	4:34
10.	"Knast" (Jail - feat. MOK)	Sido Gold	5:22
11.	"Taxi" (feat. Olli Banjo)	Roe Beardie	3:06
12.	"Fuffies im Club" (€50-bills in the club)	Roe Beardie	3:47
13.	"Was hat er?" (What does he have? - feat. Olli Banjo)	Roe Beardie	4:09
14.	"Glas hoch" (Glass up - feat. Harris)	Beathoavenz	4:59
15.	"Die Sekte" (The sect - feat. Die Sekte)	B-Tight	5:04
16.	"Ghettoloch" (Ghetto hole)	Roe Beardie	3:58
17.	"Sido aus'm Block" (Sido from the hood)	Bommer	1:21

== Charts ==
=== Weekly charts ===
Chart (2004)	Peak position
Austrian Albums (Ö3 Austria)	46
German Albums (Offizielle Top 100)	3
Swiss Albums (Schweizer Hitparade)	79

=== Year-end charts ===
Chart (2004)	Position
German Albums (Offizielle Top 100)	46
