= Dirie =

Dirie is a Somali surname. Notable people with the surname include:

- Ali Dirie, Somali Canadian convicted on terrorism charges in 2009
- Asha Gelle Dirie (born 1966), Somali politician and civil society activist
- Waris Dirie (born 1965), Somali model, author, actress and social activist

== See also ==
- D-Irie, rapper
