= Sektenmuzik =

German record label

- Founded: 2006
- Founder: Sido and B-Tight
- Genre: Hip hop, rap, gangsta rap
- Country of origin: Germany
- Location: Berlin
- Official website: sektenmuzik.net

Sektenmuzik was a Berlin-based independent record label until mid-2012, formed by German rappers Sido and B-Tight.

Sektenmuzik was founded at the end of 2006 and beginning of 2007 by Sido and B-Tight, also known as the duo A.i.d.S. The duo was formed from the rap crew Die Sekte, which has been active since 1998. It features Vokalmatador, Sido, B-Tight, and Rhymin Simon.

== Artists ==
The following artists were former Sektenmuzik artists:

- B-Tight
- Tony D
- Alpa Gun
- Bendt
- Fuhrmann
- Greckoe
- Freddy Cool
- Koeppen
- Schmökill
- Viruz
- Diego (producer)
- DJ Werd (DJ)

The following artists are members of Die Sekte, but are signed to another label:

- Sido (signed to Universal)
- MOK (released three times over Sektenmuzik)

== Release ==
=== Albums ===
Year	Title	Artist	Chart position (Germany)
2006	Badboys	MOK	
2006	Das Beste	MOK	
2006	Badboys 2	MOK	
2007	Sampler 1	Sektenmuzik	
2007	Geladen und entsichert	Alpa Gun	18
2007	Ein Level weiter	Greckoe	31
2007	Psychose	Grüne Medizin	
2007	HARRYge Angelegenheit	Harris	
2008	Sampler 2	Sektenmuzik	14
2008	Aufstand auf den billigen Plätzen	Alpa Gun	
2008	2 Chaoten	Fuhrmann & Bendt	
2008	Typisch Griechisch	Greckoe	
2008	Ab in Club	Harris, DJ Sweap & Pfund 500	
2009	Sampler 3	Sektenmuzik	
2009	Die Sekte	Die Sekte	
