= Alles ist die Sekte =

- Also known as: RoyalTS, A.i.d.S
- Origin: Berlin, Germany
- Genres: German hip hop
- Occupation: Rapper
- Years active: 1997–2009
- Labels: Royal Bunker (1998–2001); Aggro Berlin (2001–2009); Sektenmuzik
- Members: Sido; B-Tight

Alles ist die Sekte ("The cult is everything"), abbreviated A.i.d.S and formerly called RoyalTS, is a German hip hop duo from Berlin, composed of the rappers Sido and B-Tight.

== History ==
After several releases through Royal Bunker, they moved to Aggro Berlin. They did support gigs for American hip hop groups Hieroglyphics and The Arsonists. Today, A.i.d.S. forms the core of Die Sekte. Sido and B-Tight are now better known for their solo albums; Sido's Maske was one of the most successful German hip hop releases in 2004.

== Discography ==
- 1998: Wissen Flow Talent
- 1999: Sintflows (with Rhymin Simon and Collins)
- 2000: Back in Dissniss
- 2001: Alles ist die Sekte
- 2001: Das Mic und Ich
- 2001: Ihr Nutten
- 2002: Alles ist die Sekte Album Nr. 3
- 2003: Gar nich so schlimm!
- 2009: Die Sekte
