= MOK =

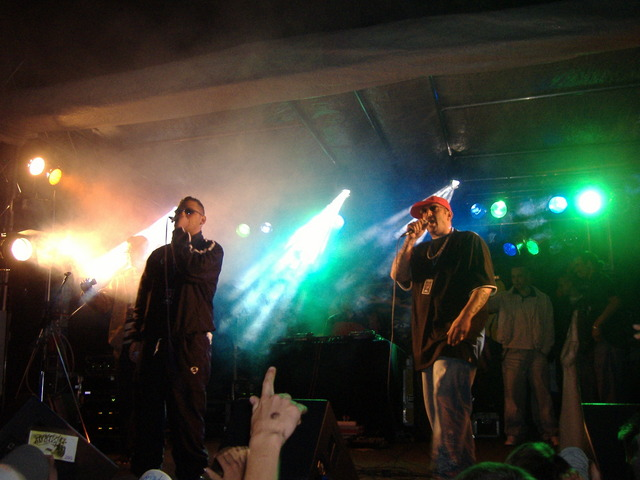
- MOK (right) rapping with Bass Sultan Hengzt (left) in 2006

Background information
- Born: Tarkan Karaalioğlu; September 21, 1976 (age 49); Neukölln, West Berlin, West Germany
- Origin: Turkey
- Genres: Gangsta rap Hip-hop & rap
- Years active: 1997–present
- Labels: Yo!Musix (2006-2009); Sektenmuzik

Tarkan Karaalioğlu (born 21 September 1976), better known as MOK, is a German rapper of Turkish descent. His name "MOK" means "Muzik oder Knast" ("Music or jail"). It was given to him by Berlin hip hopper Maxim. He is a member of rap crew Die Sekte. He got his own label at Sony BMG called Yo!Musix.

MOK is well known for his controversies with other German rappers, including Bushido, Kool Savas, and Farid Bang. During his career he released many diss tracks, but they did not receive much attention, so the others did not respond.

== Discography ==
=== Albums ===
- 2004: Neukölln Hustler
- 2007: Hustler
- 2007: Straßenmukke
- 2008: Geldwäsche (with G-Hot)
- 2009: Most Wanted
- 2013: Ghetto Picasso

=== Extended plays ===
- 2002: Fick M.O.R.
- 2005: Muzik oder Knast

=== Mixtapes ===
- 2006: Badboys
- 2006: Das Beste
- 2006: Badboys 2
- 2008: Jailhouse Pop

=== Singles ===
- 2007: Big Boss
- 2007: Hustler
