= Die Sekte =

- Origin: Berlin, Germany
- Genres: German hip hop
- Years active: 1998–present
- Label: Sektenmuzik
- Members: Sido; B-Tight; Alpa Gun; Tony D MOK; Bendt; DJ Werd; Fuhrman
- Past members: Rhymin Simon; Vokalmatador; Calle; Collins; Kimba; Milo$

Die Sekte is a German rap group from Berlin, formed in 1998 by Sido, B-Tight, Rhymin Simon and Vokalmatador. Originally it consisted of only Sido and B-Tight, also known as duo A.i.d.S.

Since 2009, with the release of their debut album Die Sekte, the group consisted of Sido, B-Tight, Alpa Gun, Tony D, MOK, Bendt, Fuhrman and DJ Werd. All members are from Märkisches Viertel, except Alpa Gun (from Berlin-Schöneberg), Tony D and MOK (from Neukölln).

Die Sekte was one of the first rap groups from Berlin and they have already sold 20,000 copies of their first EP and mixtapes.

== History ==
They produced their first releases on a PlayStation. Their song lyrics contains themes such as the hard social life in the "ghetto". The new German hip hop style was, at that time, critic about the music production and the song themes. On the EP Sintflows in 1998, the artists Calle, Collins, Kimba and Milo$ joined the group; however in 2001, they left the group, except Sido und B-Tight.

== Discography ==
- Die Sekte (2009)
