= Kitty Kat =

German rapper and singer

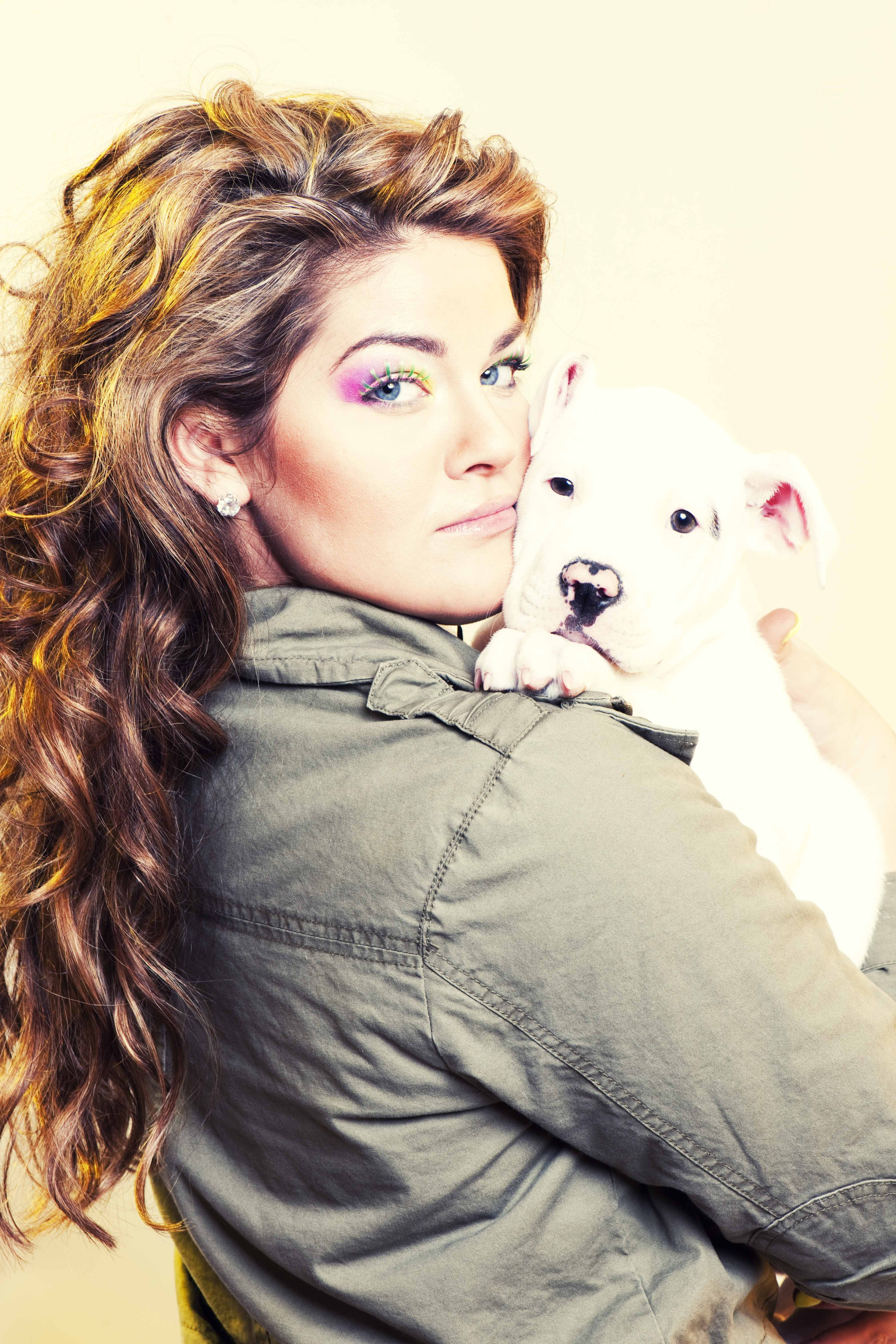

Background information
- Born: Katharina Löwel; 22 January 1982 (age 43); East Berlin, East Germany
- Genres: Hip hop, rap, Deutschrap
- Years active: 2009-present
- Labels: Aggro Berlin (2006-2009)

Katharina Löwel (born 22 January 1982), better known under her stage name Kitty Kat or Kitten Ket, is a German rapper and singer. She became famous as an Aggro Berlin member, where she was signed from 2006 to 2009.

== Biography ==
Katharina Löwel was born in East Berlin. Her parents fled with her and her sister to West Germany, where they continued their life in Augsburg. After finishing secondary school, she started training as a bank clerk in Munich. She returned to Berlin in 2003, where she met Paul NZA, who contacted Aggro Berlin, and in 2006 signed with Aggro Berlin, appearing as a guest artist on several releases. Her physical appearance remained a secret until the release of the sampler Aggro Anti Ansage Nr. 8. Since then, she has performed as a solo artist.

In an interview with the magazine Bravo Hip Hop Special, she announced that she was working on her first solo album Miyo!, which was released in mid-2009, after the lead singles "Bitchfresse (L.M.S)" and "Braves Mädchen" had been released.

In 2021, Löwel collaborated with german-rapper Shirin David for their song Be a Hoe/Break a Hoe. The song peaked at number one on the official german music charts.

== Discography ==
=== Albums ===
Title	Year	Chart positions		
Title	Year	GER	AUT	CH
Miyo!	2009	29	51	—
Pink Mafia	2011	71	—	—
Kattitude	2014	—	—	—
Love & Hip Hop	2018	—	—	—

=== Singles ===
Title	Year	Chart positions			Album
Title	Year	GER	AUT	CH	Album
"Beweg dein Arsch" (Sido with Scooter feat. Kitty Kat, Tony D)	2009	17	34	100	Hands on Scooter
"Braves Mädchen"	2009	58	54	—	Miyo!
"Be a Hoe/Break a Hoe" (with Shirin David)	2021	1	7	16	Bitches brauchen Rap

=== Other releases ===
Year	Title	Info(s)
2008	"Aggro im Club 001 [EP]" (with Sido & B-Tight)	—
2008	"Meine Zeit"	Released on the Juice CD #84
2009	"Früher wart ihr Fans" (with Fler & Godsilla)	Diss track aiming at Kollegah & Favorite

== Awards and nominations ==
=== Results ===
Year	Award	Nomination	Work	Result	Ref.
2021	Hiphop.de Awards	Best Song National	Be a Hoe/Break a Hoe (with Shirin David)	Nominated	
2021	Hiphop.de Awards	Best Beat of the Year	Be a Hoe/Break a Hoe (with Shirin David)	Nominated	
