= Aggro Berlin =

German hip-hop independent record label

- Founded: 2001; 25 years ago
- Founder: Specter, Halil and Spaiche
- Defunct: 2009
- Status: Dissolved
- Distributors: Groove Attack (2001–2007); Universal Music Group (2007–2009)
- Genre: Hip-hop, gangsta rap
- Country of origin: Germany
- Location: Berlin, Germany

Aggro Berlin was a German hip-hop independent record label based in Berlin that existed from 1 January 2001 until 1 April 2009. Three artists (Sido, Tony D and Kitty Kat) were signed with the label at the time of its closure.

"Aggro" is German slang for having an aggressive attitude (as in British English).

== History ==
The label was founded on 1 January 2001 by Berlin rappers Specter, Spaiche and Halil. The first signed artists were Sido and B-Tight. Later, the label also signed Bushido. The same year it released EP Das Mic und ich by A.i.d.S (formerly Royal TS) on the label, which was the first release of Aggro Berlin. In 2002 released the two samplers Aggro Ansage Nr. 1 and Aggro Ansage Nr. 2, which contains tracks by its signed artists. Fler was also featured on the second sampler, but he had not yet signed on to the label. Bushido and Fler released, in the same year, the collabo album, entitled Carlo Cokxxx Nutten.

In 2003, Aggro Berlin released Bushido's debut album Vom Bordstein bis zur Skyline, which was indexed by the BPjM (Federal Department for Media Harmful to Young People).

Later, in 2004, Sido's debut album, Maske sold more than 100,000 copies in less than a month. In September of that year, the rapper won a prestigious German music award for "Best Newcomer", but his album had been indexed.

In June 2004, Bushido left the label and signed with Universal.

G-Hot's contract ran out in Autumn 2006. After the song "Keine Toleranz" (No Tolerance) appeared on the internet in July 2007, Aggro Berlin renounced any further business association with him. The song, which featured Boss A, discriminates against homosexuals and calls to kill homosexuals. It was not officially released by any label and G-Hot stated that it had been recorded many years prior to its leak and was never intended to be released.

According to Sido and Fler in an interview with the German hip-hop magazine Juice, Aggro Berlin has not been a fully independent label since October 2007 but now collaborates with Universal Records.

== Notable former artists ==
Act	Years on the label	Albums under Aggro Berlin	Description
Bushido	2001–2004	2	Rapper from Berlin with Tunisian roots. His debut album Vom Bordstein bis zur Skyline (2003), reached #88 in the charts. In 2004, he left the label after a dispute with the three bosses.
Fler	2003–2009	6	Rapper from Berlin. He left in March 2009, a month before the label's closure.
Sido	2001–2009	4	Rapper from Berlin-Prenzlauer Berg of Sinti descent.
B-Tight	2001–2009	2	Rapper from Berlin of African American descent. He was born in Palm Springs, California, but grew up in Germany.
Tony D	2005–2009	1	Rapper from Berlin-Kreuzberg with Lebanese roots.
Kitty Kat	2006–2009	-	Rapper from Berlin. She was the only female artist on the label.

== Releases ==
=== Albums ===
Year	Title	Artists	Chart Positions		Status
Year	Title	Artists	GER	AUT	Status
2001	Splash Special	A.i.d.S.			
2001	Das Mic und ich	A.i.d.S.			
2002	Alles ist die Sekte: Album Nr. 3	A.i.d.S.			
2002	Aggro Ansage Nr. 1	Aggro Berlin			
2002	Carlo Cokxxx Nutten	Sonny Black (Bushido) & Frank White (Fler)			
2002	Der Neger (in mir)	B-Tight			
2002	Aggro Ansage Nr. 2	Aggro Berlin			
2003	Garnich so schlimm	A.i.d.S.			
2003	Vom Bordstein bis zur Skyline	Bushido	87		
2003	Aggro Ansage Nr. 3	Aggro Berlin			
2004	Maske	Sido	3		Gold
2004	Aggro Ansage Nr. 4	Aggro Berlin	9		Gold
2005	Neue Deutsche Welle	Fler	5		
2005	Heiße Ware	B-Tight & Tony D			
2005	Dein Lieblingsalbum	Deine Lieblingsrapper	2		
2005	Aggro Ansage Nr. 5	Aggro Berlin	7		Gold
2006	Trendsetter	Fler	4		
2006	Ich	Sido	4		Gold
2007	Willkommen in Abschaumcity	MC Bogy	92		
2007	Neger Neger	B-Tight	6		
2007	Eine Hand wäscht die Andere	Sido	21		
2007	Airmax Muzik	Fler	13		
2007	Alles oder Nichts	Jom & Said			
2007	Totalschaden	Tony D	21		
2007	Ghetto Romantik	B-Tight	54		
2007	Auferstanden aus Ruinen	Joe Rilla			
2008	Fremd im eigenen Land	Fler	7		
2008	Ich und meine Maske	Sido	1		Gold
2008	Südberlin Maskulin	Frank White (Fler) & Godsilla	22		
2008	Goldständer	B-Tight	36		
2008	Aggro Anti Ansage Nr. 8	Aggro Berlin	25		
2009	Fler	Fler			

=== Singles ===
Year	Title	Artist	Chart position		Album
Year	Title	Artist	Germany	Austria	Album
2003	"Bei Nacht"	Bushido			Vom Bordstein bis zur Skyline
2003	"Gemein wie 10"	Bushido			Vom Bordstein bis zur Skyline
2004	"Mein Block"	Sido	13		Maske
2004	"Arschficksong"	Sido	63		
2004	"Fuffies im Club"	Sido	18		Maske
2004	"Aggroberlina"	Fler	59		
2005	"Mama ist stolz"	Sido	25		
2005	"NDW 2005"	Fler	9		Neue Deutsche Welle
2005	"Steh wieder auf"	Deine Lieblings Rapper	12		Dein Lieblings Album
2005	"A.G.G.R.O./Nach eigenen Regeln"	B-Tight feat. G-Hot & Tony D	22		
2005	"Aggroberlin Zeit"	B-Tight feat. G-Hot & Tony D			Aggro Ansage Nr. 5
2006	"Wahlkampf"	Sido feat. G-Hot	36		
2006	"Papa ist zurück"	Fler	23		Trendsetter
2006	Cüs Junge	Fler feat. Muhabbet	51		
2006	X-Tasy	B-Tight			
2006	Straßenjunge	Sido	20		Maske
2006	Weihnachtssong 2006	Sido	34		
2007	Teil von mir	Sido	14		Ich
2007	Ich bins	B-Tight	45		
2007	Schlechtes Vorbild	Sido	18		Ich
2007	Der Coolste	B-Tight	92		
2007	Totalschaden	Tony D	53		Totalschaden
2008	Deutscha Bad Boy	Fler	16		
2008	Augen auf/Halt dein Maul	Sido	7		Ich und meine Maske
2008	Carmen	Sido	17		Ich und meine Maske
2009	"Beweg dein Arsch"	Sido feat. Scooter, Kitty Kat & Tony D	17		Ich und meine Maske
2009	"Check mich aus"	Fler	74		Fler
2009	"Ich sing nicht mehr für dich"	Fler feat. Doreen Steinert	33		Fler

== See also ==
- List of record labels
- List of hip-hop record labels
