= Harris (rapper) =

German rapper (born 1976)

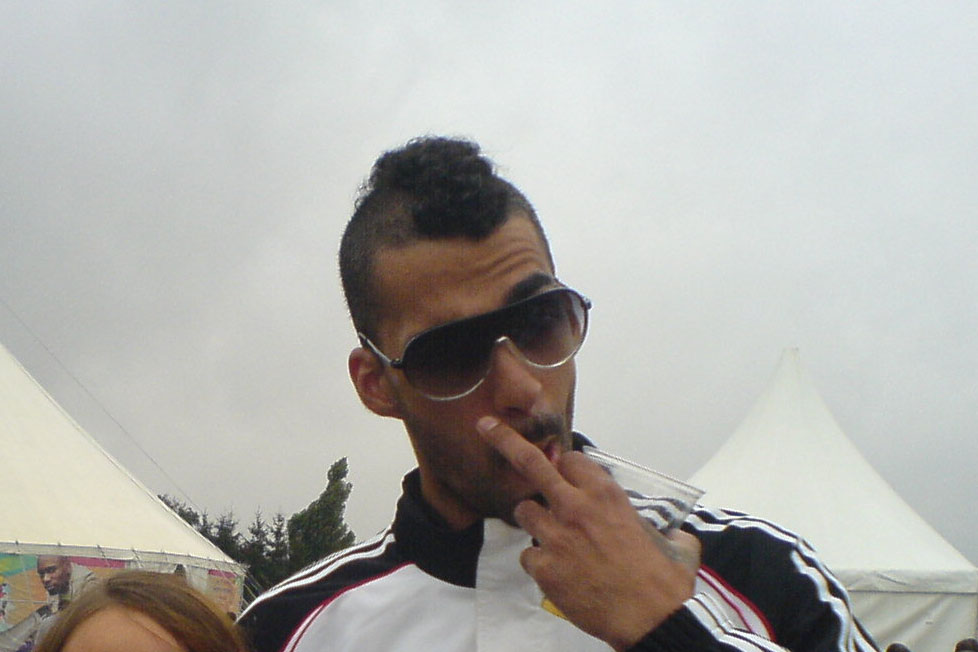
- Harris in 2006

Background information
- Born: Oliver Harris; 1976 (age 48–49); West Berlin, West Germany
- Genres: German hip hop
- Years active: 1990s–present
- Labels: G.B.Z. Imperium

Oliver Harris (born 1976), better known as Harris, is a German rapper from Berlin-Kreuzberg. He founded the hip hop duo Spezializtz and the record label G.B.Z. Imperium with Dean Dawson. Together with Sido, he forms the duo Deine Lieblings Rapper.

Harris was born in Germany to an African-American soldier father, and a German mother.

== Discography ==
=== Albums ===
- 2003 – Dirty Harry
- 2005 – Dein Lieblings Album (with Sido as Deine Lieblings Rapper)
- 2010 – Der Mann im Haus
- 2023 - Tait Eita

=== Singles ===
- 2001 – "Grundkurs"
- 2003 – "Sind wir nicht alle ein bisschen Jiggy?"
- 2005 – "Steh wieder auf" (with Sido as Deine Lieblings Rapper)
- 2011 – "Stell dir eine Welt vor" (feat. Sido)
