= Alpa Gun =

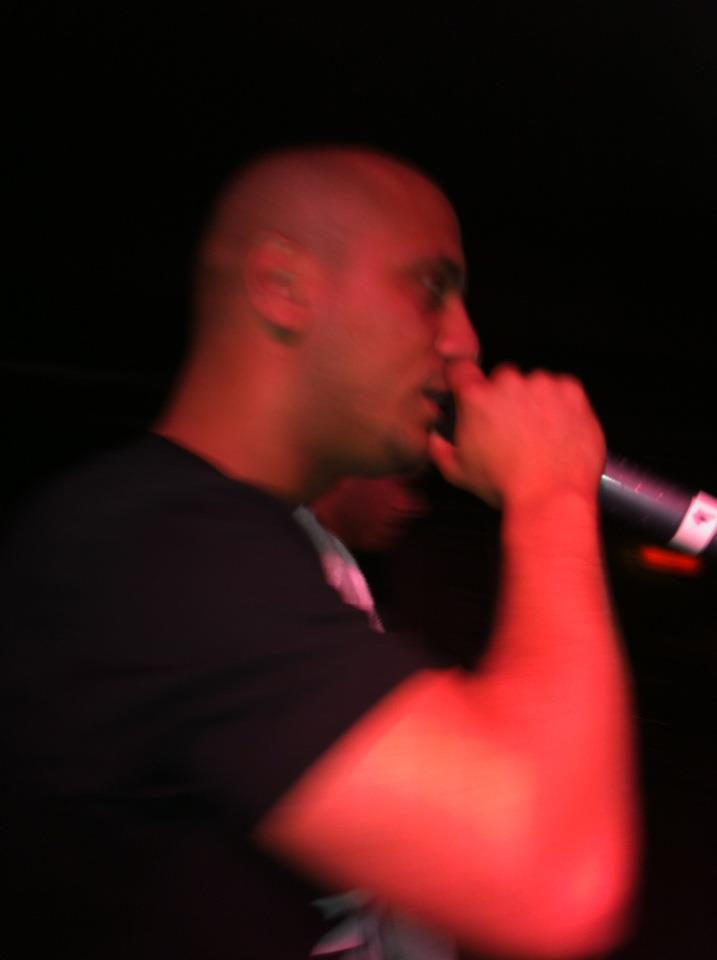
Alpa Gun in 2012

Alper Sendilmen (born 4 July 1980), better known by his stage name Alpa Gun, is a German rapper of Turkish descent. In 2004, he got signed to Berlin label Sektenmuzik and has since been a member of rap group Die Sekte.

== Discography ==
=== Studio albums ===
| Year | Album details | Peak chart positions | | | Sales |
| Year | Album details | GER | AUT | SWI | Sales |
|---|---|---|---|---|---|
| 2007 | Geladen und entsichert: Released: 2007; Label: Sektenmuzik; Formats: CD, digital download | 31 | — | — | |
| 2010 | Almanci: Released: 2010; Label: Sektenmuzik; Formats: CD, digital download | 73 | — | 67 | |
| 2012 | Ehrensache: Released: 2012; Label: Major Movez; Formats: CD, digital download | 12 | 23 | 17 | |
| 2013 | Alles kommt zurück: Released: 2013; Label: Major Movez; Formats: CD, digital download | 5 | 16 | 13 | |
| 2014 | Geboren um zu sterben: Released: 2014; Label: Major Movez; Formats: CD, digital download | 7 | 17 | 7 | |
| 2015 | Ehrensache II: Released: 2015; Label: Major Movez; Formats: CD, digital download | 30 | 50 | 27 | |
| 2016 | Zurück zur Straße: Released: 2016; Label: Major Movez; Formats: CD, digital download | 17 | 41 | 15 | |
| 2017 | Walther-P: Released: 2017; Label: Major Movez; Formats: CD, digital download | — | — | — | |

=== Extended plays ===
| Year | Title | Chart Positions | |
| Year | Title | GER | AUT |
|---|---|---|---|
| 2008 | Aufstand auf den billigen Plätzen | — | — |

=== Singles ===
| Year | Title | Chart Positions | | Album |
| Year | Title | GER | AUT | Album |
|---|---|---|---|---|
| 2007 | "Ausländer" | 53 | — | Geladen und entsichert |
| 2007 | "Verbotene Liebe" (featuring Muhabbet) | 89 | — | Geladen und entsichert |

=== Free tracks ===
| Year | Title | Info(s) |
|---|---|---|
| 2006 | "Ich bin am Zug" | Shok Muzik diss track |
| 2007 | "Schluss mit dem U(n)fuk"^{1} | Ufuk Sahin diss track; Instrumental from "Soldier" by Eminem |
| 2008 | "Frohe Weihnachten" ("Merry christmas") (with Sido) | Bushido & Kay One diss track |
| 2009 | "MySpace Exclusive" (feat. Big Baba) | Released on Alpa Gun's Myspace page |
| 2009 | "Punisher" | |

- ^{1} The title actually means Stop with that nonsense in German, but the word "U(n)fuk" is a wordplay of "Unfug" (meaning Nonsense) and the name Ufuk.
