= Sido (rapper) =

German rapper (born 1980)

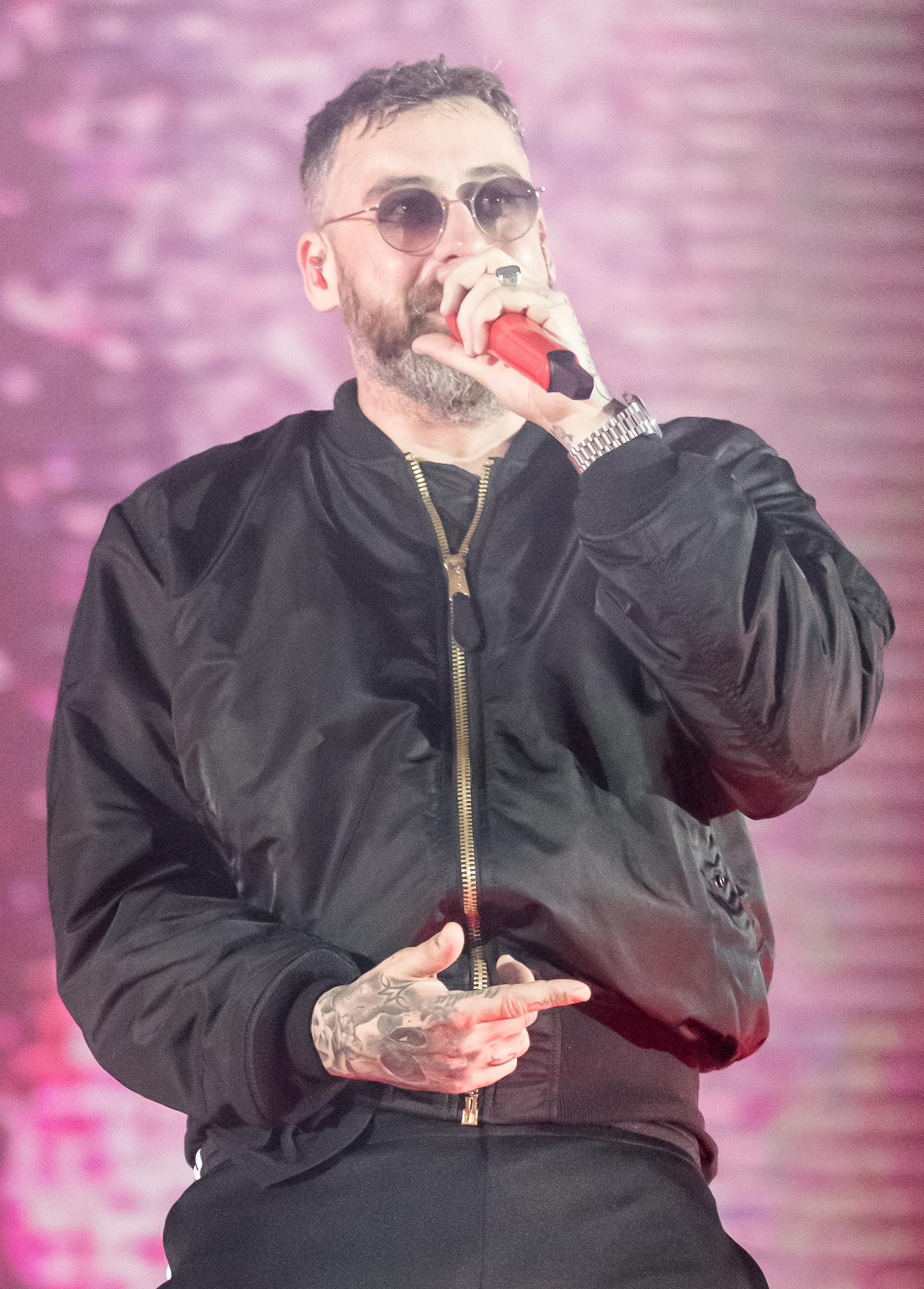
- Sido performing in 2020

Background information
- Born: Paul Hartmut Würdig; 30 November 1980 (age 45); East Berlin, East Germany
- Genres: German hip-hop; hardcore rap; pop rap
- Occupation: Rapper
- Years active: 1997–present
- Labels: Aggro Berlin (2001–2009); Sektenmuzik; Universal (2009–present)
- Website: sido.bravado.de

Paul Hartmut Würdig (born 30 November 1980), better known as Sido, is a German rapper. He interprets his stage name as "super-intelligentes Drogenopfer" (super-intelligent drug victim). It originally stood for "Scheiße in dein Ohr" (shit into your ear), a line from his track "Terroarr".

Sido is known for his provocative and aggressive lyrics. After gaining prominence with his debut album Maske in 2004, he became recognisable for wearing a silver skull mask. However, he stopped wearing the mask in 2005.

Würdig's career began in 1997 as one half of the duo Royal TS (now A.i.d.S) with B-Tight. Both were initially signed to the Berlin hip hop label Royal Bunker before joining Aggro Berlin in 2001. As of 2009, Sido has been signed to Urban/Universal Music Group.

== Early life ==
Würdig was born to a German father and a Sinti mother. At the age of eight, he and his younger sister were raised by their mother in East Berlin's Prenzlauer Berg neighbourhood. In 1988, the family relocated to West Berlin, initially living in emergency accommodation in Wedding alongside many asylum seekers. They later moved to Märkisches Viertel, a high-rise residential area in the Berlin borough of Reinickendorf. During his childhood and youth, Märkisches Viertel had a significant proportion of migrants and low-income families. He attended the Bettina-von-Arnim-Oberschule and subsequently began an apprenticeship as an educator, which he did not complete.

== Career ==
=== 1997–2002: Early career ===
Sido has been active in the music industry since 1997. Together with his best friend B-Tight, he released several EPs and demos under the name Royal TS, which were never officially published, through the Berlin underground hip hop label Royal Bunker. Sido had a long-standing friendship with DJ Tomekk. The two created a dubplate from Arschficksong, which DJ Tomekk played in clubs across Germany, introducing Sido to a broader audience for the first time. At the time, Specter, who later co-founded Aggro Berlin, was the art director for DJ Tomekk. During a concert, the duo caught the attention of Halil, Specter, and Spaiche—the eventual founders of the Aggro Berlin label.

=== 2003–2004: First successes and Maske ===
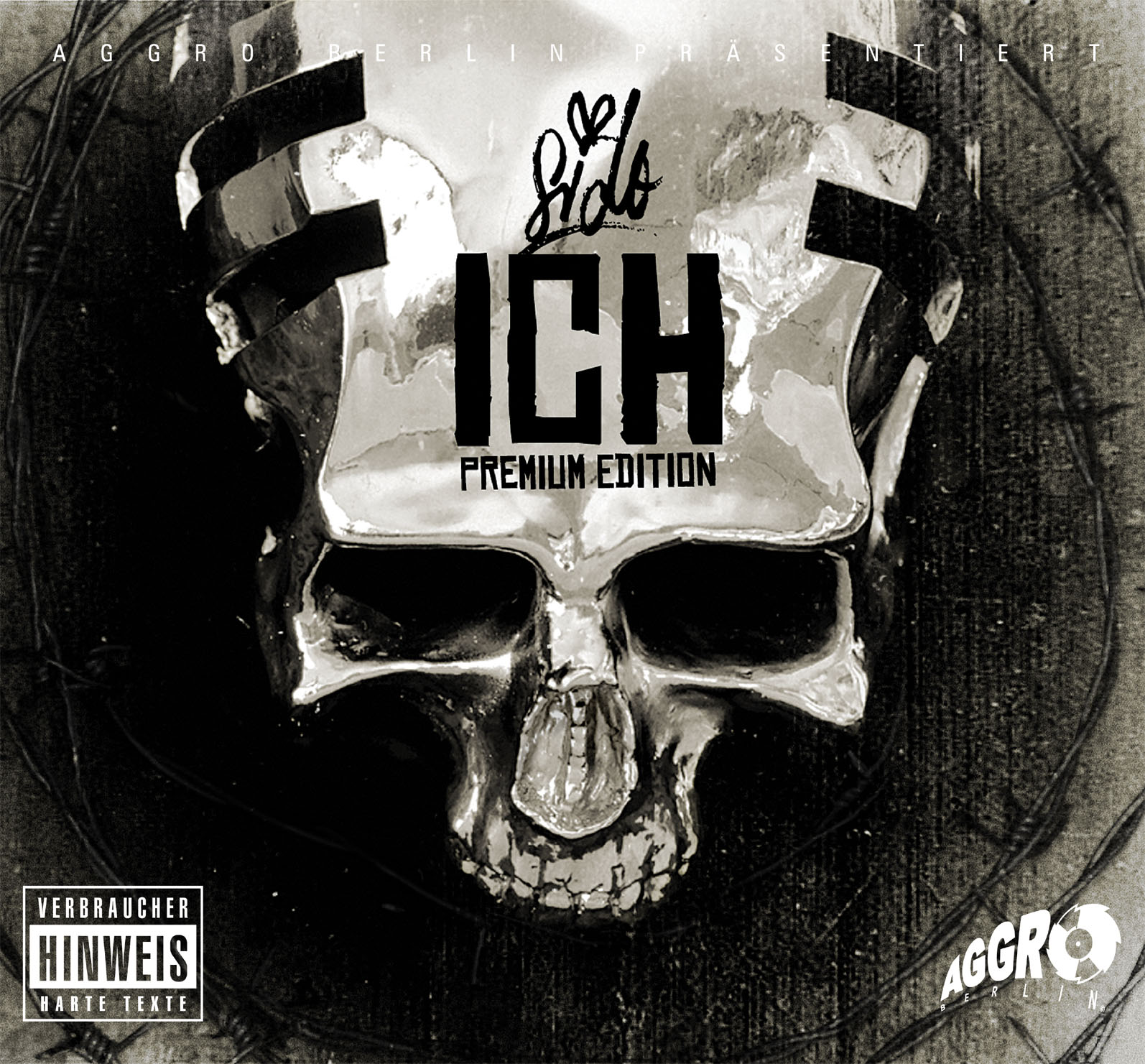
Sido's mask on the cover of the premium edition of Ich

Sido's solo career began in 2002 with the "Arschficksong" ("Ass-fuck song") on the sampler Aggro Ansage Nr. 1 and the "Weihnachtssong" ("Christmas song") on Aggro Ansage Nr. 3.

In 2004, Sido released his debut album Maske, which reached No. 3 on the German charts and has sold more than 180,000 copies to date, achieving gold status. The lead single, "Mein Block" ("My hood"), reached No. 13 on the German charts, while the second single, "Fuffies im Club" ("€50 notes in the club"), peaked at No. 18, and the third single, "Mama ist stolz" ("Mum is proud"), reached No. 25. The original album was banned due to the song "Endlich Wochenende" ("Finally weekend"), which the Federal Department for Media Harmful to Young Persons claimed glorified drug use. The album was later rereleased under the name Maske X, with "Arschficksong" replacing "Endlich Wochenende". The song was also released as a single for the first time, with the accompanying video slightly censored.

In September of the same year, Sido won a prestigious German music award for "Best Newcomer". The best-known track from the album, "Mein Block", depicts life from a resident's perspective in the Märkisches Viertel, a low-income neighbourhood of Berlin, detailing issues such as the narcotics trade, alcoholism, interactions with police, and poverty in Sido's Block, or building.

=== 2005–2006: Other projects and Ich ===
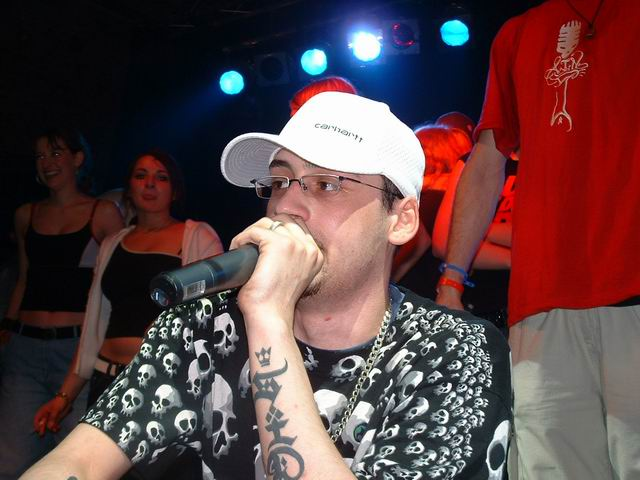
Sido performing in 2003

After this debut album, together with his label colleagues B-Tight and Fler, he released two label samplers: Aggro Ansage Nr. 4 and Aggro Ansage Nr. 5, which featured the new label artists Tony D and G-Hot.

In 2005, Sido performed with Brainless Wankers and represented Berlin in the Bundesvision Song Contest 2005 with the song "Mama ist stolz." He placed third, earning 113 points.

Later, he collaborated with rapper Harris as the rap duo Deine Lieblings Rapper ("Your Favorite Rappers"). In 2005, they released their debut album Dein Lieblings Album ("Your Favorite Album"), featuring "Steh wieder auf" ("Get Up Again") as the only single.

In December 2006, Sido released his second album, Ich, which reached No. 4 on the German album charts. Three singles—"Strassenjunge," "Ein Teil von mir," and "Schlechtes Vorbild"—were released. The album achieved gold status.

=== 2007: Sektenmuzik ===
In 2007, Sido and B-Tight (alias A.i.d.S.) founded their label Sektenmuzik and established a rap crew named Die Sekte alongside Rhymin Simon and Vokalmatador. Tony D joined the group later.

=== 2008: Ich und meine Maske and Popstars ===
Sido's third album, Ich und meine Maske, was released at the end of May 2008 and reached No. 1 on the German album charts. The singles "Augen auf"/"Halt dein Maul," "Carmen," "Herz," "Nein!" and "Beweg dein Arsch" achieved chart success.

In August 2008, Sido joined the seventh season of Popstars, titled "Just 4 Girls," as a jury member alongside Detlef D! Soost and Loona. Many were surprised by his participation, questioning why Sido, known for his provocative and aggressive lyrics, would join a mainstream TV show like Popstars. At the conclusion of Popstars, the band Queensberry was formed.

=== 2009: Aggro Berlin ===
On 1 April 2009, the label Aggro Berlin was closed. Sido subsequently signed with Urban Records, a division of Universal Music Germany.

On 30 October 2009, Sido released his fourth studio album, Aggro Berlin. The lead single, "Hey du!", reached No. 4 on the German charts. In this song, Sido reflects on his upbringing in East Germany and his later life in West Berlin. He revealed that he had concealed his East Berlin origins for a long time due to fear of bullying.

=== 2013: "Best of" compilation ===
In 2013, Sido released a "best of" compilation including four new songs, of which 2012's "Bilder im Kopf" showed him moving towards pop-rap.

== Personal life ==
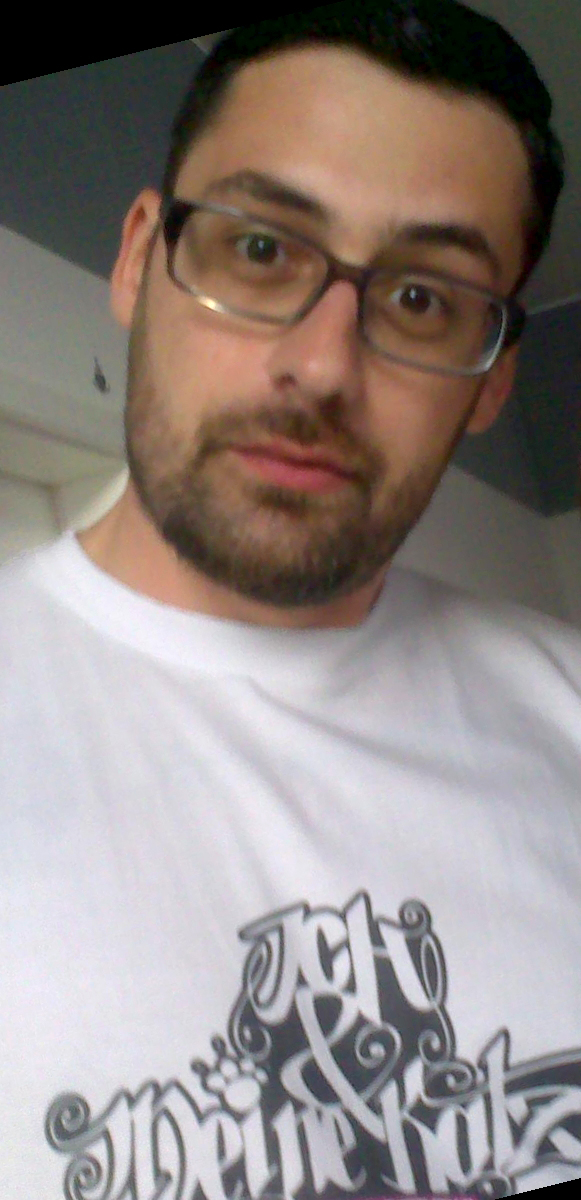
Sido in 2010

Würdig has a son, whose name and date of birth are not publicly known, but he references him in the songs "Aggro Gold" and "2010", among others.

He began dating former Nu Pagadi lead singer Doreen Steinert in mid-2005, and on 14 February 2010, they became engaged. However, in April 2012, they broke off their engagement. A few weeks later, in early May 2012, Würdig confirmed rumors that he had begun dating German TV presenter Charlotte Engelhardt. Würdig had a second son with Engelhardt in 2013.

Würdig is the second cousin of German DSDS participant Menowin Fröhlich.

== Controversy ==
The perceived rebellious tendencies of Sido's label affiliates B-Tight, Fler, and G-Hot, whose personas emphasize embittered racial or class standpoints, have generated additional discussion in widely circulated publications.

=== MTV HipHop Open ===
In July 2004, Sido performed live in Stuttgart at the MTV HipHop Open festival. During his performance, he insulted Frankfurt rapper Azad's mother, saying: "If we had a bed right here, I'd bang Azad's mother." A week later, Sido and Azad met backstage, and after a brief dispute, it escalated into a brawl involving the artists of Aggro Berlin and Bozz Music. Security and the police arrived to stop the conflict, but Azad and his crew had already fled.

=== Antisemitism and conspiracy theories ===
Sido has been accused of promoting conspiracy theories. In a 2020 video with rapper Ali Bumaye, Sido appeared to endorse the QAnon conspiracy theory. Sido has also faced criticism for comments alleged to be antisemitic. Journalist Eliran Kendi claimed that Sido "reaches into the anti-Semitic bag of tricks" and "specifically triggers the audience in the direction of the Jewish world conspiracy." However, Sido has distanced himself from the antisemitic conspiracy theorists Attila Hildmann and KenFM.

== Discography ==
=== Studio albums ===
- Maske (2004)
- Ich (2006)
- Ich und meine Maske (2008)
- Aggro Berlin (2009)
- 30.11.80 (2013)
- VI (2015)
- Das goldene Album (2016)
- Ich & keine Maske (2019)
- Paul (2022)

=== Live albums ===
- MTV Unplugged Live aus'm MV (arranged and produced by Sven Helbig) (2010)

=== Collaborations ===
- Dein Lieblingsalbum (with Deine Lieblingsrapper) (2005)
- Die Sekte (with Die Sekte) (2009)
- 23 (with Bushido) (2011)
- Crystals (with Eskimo Callboy) (2015)
- Royal Bunker (with Kool Savas) (2017)

=== Soundtrack ===
- Blutzbrüdaz – Die Mukke zum Film (with various artists) (2011)

=== Compilation ===
- No. Beste (2012)
- Kronjuwelen (2018)

== Filmography ==
Year	Film	Role	Notes
2009	Männersache	Guido	Comedy
2011	Blutzbrüdaz	Otis	
2015	Half Brothers	Julian	Comedy
2017	Eine Braut kommt selten allein	Johnny	

== Awards and certifications ==
- 2004: Bravo Otto in Gold in the category "National rapper"
- 2004: Comet in the category "National Newcomer"
- 2006: Bravo Otto in Silver in the category "Best Rapper National" (Sido)
- 2006: Juice-Awards: 1st place in the category "Album National" for "Ich"
- 2007: Golden Tape for 15 No. 1 rankings "Strassenjunge" in the video on MTV's TRL
- 2007: Bravo Otto in Silver in the category "National Hip-Hop"
- 2009: Swiss Music Award in the category "Best Urban Album International"
- 2009: Comet in the category "Best Song"
- 2010: Echo in the category "Best Video" for "Hey Du"!
- 2010: Comet in the category "Best Song"
- 2010: MTV Europe Music Award in the category Best German Act
- 2011: Comet in the category "Best Artist"
- 2012: Echo-winner in the category Bestes Video National for So mach ich es with Bushido

Gold Record

- Germany
  - 2004: for the album "Maske"
  - 2004: for the sampler "Aggro Ansage Nr. 4"
  - 2005: for the sampler "Aggro Ansage Nr. 5"
  - 2006: for the album "Ich"
  - 2011: for the album "Ich und meine Maske"
  - 2012: for the album "23"
  - 2013: for the single "Der Himmel soll warten"
- Austria
  - 2008: for the album "Ich und meine Maske"
  - 2011: for the album "23"
  - 2012: for the album "Blutzbrüdaz - die Mukke zum Film"
- Switzerland
  - 2008: for the album "Ich und meine Maske"

Platinum Record

- Switzerland
  - 2009: for the album "Ich und meine Maske"

Country	Gold	Platinum
Germany	7	0
Austria	3	0
Switzerland	1	1
total	11	1

== Literature ==
- Lars Marcel Feige and Sido (2006), Ich will mein Lied zurück (in German), Berlin: Schwarzkopf & Schwarzkopf Verlag, ISBN 978-3-89602-733-7
