= B-Tight =

German rapper

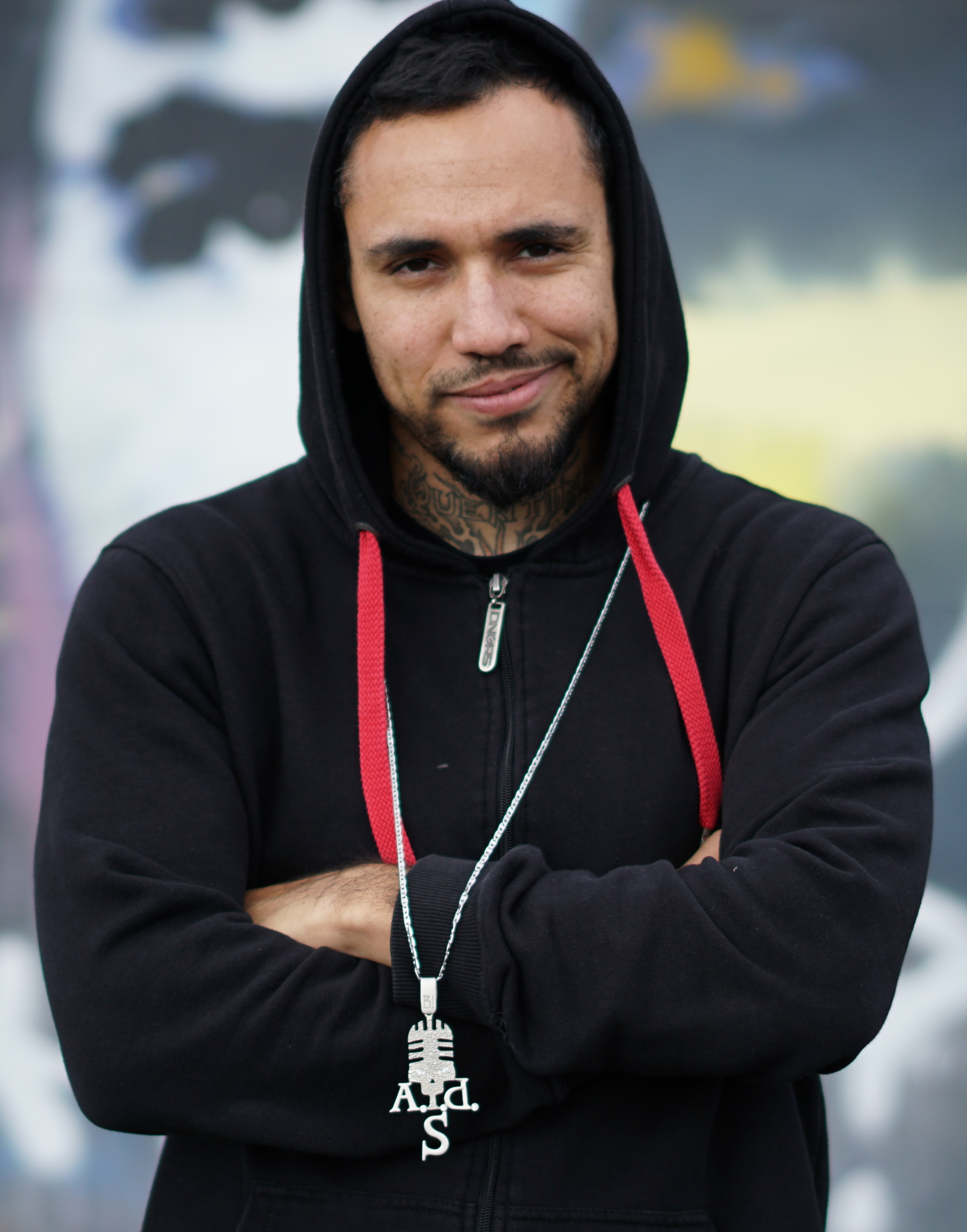
- B-Tight in 2016

Background information
- Also known as: B!Tight; Der Neger; Bobby; Bobby Dick
- Born: Robert Edward Davis; 28 December 1979 (age 46); Palm Springs, California, U.S.
- Origin: Berlin, Germany
- Genres: Hip hop; gangsta rap
- Occupation: Rapper
- Years active: 1998–present
- Labels: Aggro Berlin (2001–2009); Sektenmuzik
- Member of: A.i.d.S
- Website: www.b-tight.de

Robert Edward Davis (born 28 December 1979), known professionally as B-Tight, is an American-born German rapper.

== Early life ==
Davis was born in Palm Springs, California, to a German mother and an African American father, but grew up in Berlin.

When he was younger, he initially wanted to become a professional basketball player. However, a foot injury prevented him from doing so. Davis grew up in Märkisches Viertel in Berlin, where he also met his later roommate and rap partner Sido, with whom he formed the duo A.i.d.S and they began to write song lyrics. The group's beats were made on a PlayStation.

== Career ==
=== 1998–2000: Early career ===
Davis and Sido released their first demo album, Wissen Flow Talent, over hip hop label Royal Bunker, as duo called Royal TS. It follows more demo recordings of them, joined by Vokalmatador and Rhymin Simon. Later they formed group Die Sekte, but they broke up in 2000. In the same year Davis released his first release B-Tight sein Album as demo tape.

=== 2001–2004: Rise to "fame" ===
In 2001, B-Tight signed in January to Berlin-based label Aggro Berlin, as well as Sido. Both rappers released their EP Das Mic und ich as Royal TS and the labels official first release. B-Tight released his EP Der Neger (in mir), in 2002, but it caused controversies as its hard and aggressive song lyrics, which were typical of the label's music style. Later rapper Bushido signed, who joined B-Tight and Sido.

In 2002, B-Tight worked with his label mates on their label albums Aggro Ansage Nr. 1 and Aggro Ansage Nr. 2 (released 2003).

In 2005, Davis recorded songs with Tony D for their mixtape Heisse Ware.

== Music ==
B-Tight is affiliated with the music label Aggro Berlin with whom he released a number of hit singles; amongst them, "Der Neger". Another popular single was titled "Neger bums mich!" (Negro fuck me!) on the "Aggro Ansage Nr. 3". His songs often tell about a fight between black and white in himself.

== Discography ==
=== Singles ===
B-Tight singles
Title	Artist	Year	Peak German singles chart
"Ich bins"	B-Tight	2007	45
"Der Coolste"	B-Tight	2007	92
"Hol doch die Polizei"	Sido & B-Tight	2012	58

=== Albums ===
Year	Album details	Peak chart positions		
Year	Album details	GER	AUT	SWI
2007	Neger Neger: Released: 27 April 2007; Label: Aggro Berlin; Formats: CD, digital download	6	16	35
2008	Goldständer: Released: 31 October 2008; Label: Aggro Berlin; Formats: CD, digital download	36		96
2012	Drinne: Released: 28 September 2012; Label: Raid Records; Formats: CD, digital download	60		
2015	Retro: Released: 9 January 2015; Label: Raid Records; Formats: CD, digital download	8	17	35
2016	Born 2 B-Tight: Released: 8 January 2016; Label: Raid Records; Formats: CD, digital download	6	46	61
2017	Wer hat das Gras weggeraucht?: Released: 3 February 2017; Label: Raid Records; Formats: CD, digital download	3	5	28
2018	A.i.d.S. Royal: Released: 23 February 2018; Label: Jetzt Paul, Groove Attack; Formats: CD, digital download	1	6	16
2019	Aggroswing: Released: 22 February 2019; Label: Jetzt Paul; Formats: CD, digital download	8	22	71
2020	Bobby Dick: Released: 20 March 2020; Label: Jetzt Paul; Formats: CD, digital download	8	54	—
