= Bushido discography =

Rapper discography

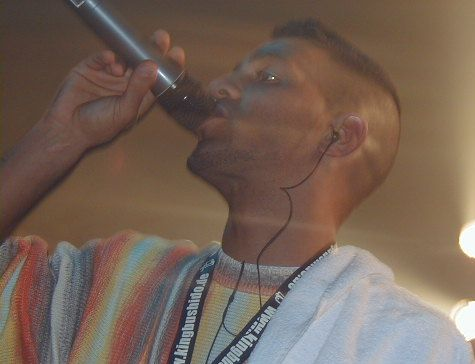
- Bushido live in 2005
- Studio albums: 14
- Live albums: 4
- Compilation albums: 7
- Singles: 56
- Music videos: 38
- Collaborative albums: 5

This is the discography of German rapper Bushido, who has sold more than 1.5 million records in Germany alone, as of 2009. He has earned fifteen gold and three platinum certifications for his records.

He has released throughout his 14 studio albums, 4 live albums, 7 compilation albums, 5 collaboration albums, 5 underground releases and 56 singles in total (31 solo singles, 8 collaboration singles, 15 as featured artist).

== Albums ==
=== Studio albums ===
Title	Album details	Peak chart positions			Certifications
Title	Album details	GER	AUT	SWI	Certifications
Vom Bordstein bis zur Skyline	Released: 14 July 2003; Label: Aggro Berlin; Formats: CD, digital download	88	—	—	
Electro Ghetto	Released: 25 October 2004; Label: ersguterjunge; Format: CD, digital download	6	63	81	BVMI: Gold
Staatsfeind Nr. 1	Released: 4 November 2005; Label: ersguterjunge; Format: CD, digital download	4	13	32	BVMI: Gold
Von der Skyline zum Bordstein zurück	Released: 1 September 2006; Label: ersguterjunge; Format: CD, digital download	2	3	15	BVMI: Gold; IFPI AUT: Gold
7	Released: 31 August 2007; Label: ersguterjunge; Format: CD, digital download	1	2	2	BVMI: Gold; IFPI AUT: Platinum
Heavy Metal Payback	Released: 10 October 2008; Label: ersguterjunge; Format: CD, digital download	1	2	2	BVMI: Gold; IFPI AUT: Gold
Zeiten ändern dich	Released: 19 February 2010; Label: ersguterjunge; Format: CD, digital download	2	1	3	BVMI: Gold; IFPI AUT: Gold
Jenseits von Gut und Böse	Released: 13 May 2011; Label: ersguterjunge; Format: CD, digital download	1	1	1	
AMYF	Released: 12 October 2012; Label: ersguterjunge; Format: CD, digital download	1	2	1	BVMI: Gold
Sonny Black	Released: 24 February 2014; Label: ersguterjunge; Format: CD, digital download	1	1	1	BVMI: Gold; IFPI AUT: Gold; IFPI SWI: Gold
Carlo Cokxxx Nutten 3	Released: 13 February 2015; Label: ersguterjunge; Format: CD, digital download	1	1	1	BVMI: Gold; IFPI AUT: Gold
Black Friday	Released: 9 June 2017; Label: ersguterjunge; Format: CD, digital download	1	1	1	BVMI: Gold
Mythos	Released: 28 September 2018; Label: ersguterjunge; Format: CD, digital download	1	1	1	
Carlo Cokxxx Nutten 4	Released: 20 December 2019; Label: ersguterjunge; Format: CD, digital download	1	11	1	
Sonny Black II	Released: 17 December 2021; Label: ersguterjunge; Format: CD, digital download	2	14	3	
"—" denotes items which were not released in that country or failed to chart.

=== Collaborative albums ===
Title	Album details	Peak chart positions			Certifications
Title	Album details	GER	AUT	SWI	Certifications
Carlo Cokxxx Nutten (with Fler)	Released: 21 October 2002; Label: Aggro Berlin	—	—	—	
Carlo Cokxxx Nutten II (with Baba Saad)	Released: 4 April 2005; Label: ersguterjunge	3	22	—	
Carlo Cokxxx Nutten 2 (with Fler)	Released: 11 September 2009; Label: ersguterjunge	3	5	9	
Berlins Most Wanted (with Berlins Most Wanted)	Released: 22 October 2010; Label: ersguterjunge	2	3	3	
23 (with Sido)	Released: 14 October 2011; Label: Sony Music / Columbia	3	3	1	IFPI AUT: Gold
Cla$$ic (with Shindy)	Released: 6 November 2015; Label: ersguterjunge	1	1	1	BVMI: Gold; IFPI AUT: Gold
"—" denotes items which were not released in that country or failed to chart.

=== Compilation albums ===
Title	Album details	Peak chart positions		
Title	Album details	GER	AUT	SWI
Das Beste	Released: 9 November 2007; Label: ersguterjunge; Formats: CD, digital download	27	30	68

=== Live albums ===
Title	Album details	Peak chart positions			Certifications
Title	Album details	GER	AUT	SWI	Certifications
Deutschland, gib mir ein Mic!	Released: 28 April 2006; Label: ersguterjunge; Formats: CD, DVD	10	37	68	BVMI: Gold
7 Live	Released: 15 February 2008; Label: ersguterjunge; Formats: CD, DVD	—	37	76	
Heavy Metal Payback Live	Released: 9 January 2009; Label: ersguterjunge; Formats: CD, DVD	—	47	—	
Zeiten ändern dich – Live durch Europa	Released: 13 August 2010; Label: ersguterjunge; Formats: CD, DVD	—	3	5	
"—" denotes items which were not released in that country or failed to chart.

=== Demos ===
List of demos
Title	Album details
Westberlin Represent (with King Orgasmus One & Vader)	Released: 1998; Label: Independent; Format: MC; as part of the 030 Squad
Demotape	Released: 1999; Label: Independent; Format: MC
King of KingZ	Released: 2001; Label: I Luv Money Records; Format: MC
New Kidz on the Block (with DJ Devin & Fler)	Released: 2003; Label: Aggro Berlin; Format: MC

== Singles ==
=== As lead artist ===
List of singles, with selected chart positions and certifications
Title	Year	Peak chart positions			Certifications	Album
Title	Year	GER	AUT	SWI	Certifications	Album
"Bei Nacht"	2003	—	—	—		Vom Bordstein bis zur Skyline
"Gemein wie 10	2003	—	—	—		Vom Bordstein bis zur Skyline
"Electro Ghetto"	2004	31	—	—		Electro Ghetto
"Nie wieder"	2004	53	—	—		Electro Ghetto
"Hoffnung stirbt zuletzt" (featuring Cassandra Steen)	2005	29	—	—		Electro Ghetto
"Nie ein Rapper" (with Baba Saad)	2005	24	—	—		Carlo Cokxxx Nutten II
"Endgegner"	2005	13	48	—		Staatsfeind Nr. 1
"Augenblick"	2006	17	42	—		Staatsfeind Nr. 1
"Von der Skyline zum Bordstein zurück"	2006	14	34	—		Von der Skyline zum Bordstein zurück
"Sonnenbank Flavour"	2006	15	25	—		Von der Skyline zum Bordstein zurück
"Vendetta" with Chakuza & Eko Fresh)	2006	32	53	—		Vendetta – ersguterjunge Sampler Vol. 2
"Janine"	2007	23	35	—		Von der Skyline zum Bordstein zurück
"Alles verloren"	2007	4	3	22	BVMI: Gold	7
"Alles Gute kommt von unten" (with Chakuza & Kay One)	2007	57	68	—		Alles Gute kommt von unten – ersguterjunge Sampler Vol. 3
"Reich mir nicht deine Hand"	2007	23	28	—		7
"Ching Ching"	2008	9	16	54		Heavy Metal Payback
"Für immer jung" (featuring Karel Gott)	2008	5	15	70	BVMI: Gold; IFPI AUT: Gold	Heavy Metal Payback
"Kennst du die Stars" (featuring Oliver Pocher)	2009	44	—	—		Heavy Metal Payback
"Eine Chance/Zu Gangsta" (with Fler)	2009	26	26	—		Carlo Cokxxx Nutten 2
"Alles wird gut"	2010	10	12	20	BVMI: Gold	Zeiten ändern dich
"Fackeln im Wind" (featuring Kay One)	2010	6	52	—		Non-album track
"Zeiten ändern dich"	2010	—	—	63		Zeiten ändern dich
"Berlins Most Wanted" (as a part of Berlins Most Wanted)	2010	31	57	—		Berlins Most Wanted
"Vergiss Mich" (featuring J-Luv)	2011	19	26	34		Jenseits von Gut und Böse
"Wie ein Löwe"	2011	—	31	—		Jenseits von Gut und Böse
"Das ist Business" (featuring Kay One)	2011	—	60	—		Jenseits von Gut und Böse
"Wärst du immer noch hier?"	2011	44	48	68		Jenseits von Gut und Böse
"So mach ich es" (with Sido)	2011	23	32	37		23
"Erwachsen sein" (with Sido featuring Peter Maffay)	2011	29	29	—		23
"Kleine Bushidos"	2012	45	46	52		AMYF
"Lass mich allein"	2012	61	52	34		AMYF
"Theorie & Praxis" (featuring JokA)	2012	—	—	—	BVMI: Gold	AMYF
"Panamera Flow" (Note: "Panamera Flow" has been released as a single for Bushido's AMYF and for Shindy's NWA 2.0.) (featuring Shindy)	2013	51	—	—	BVMI: Gold	AMYF & NWA 2.0
"Gangsta Rap Kings" (featuring Kollegah & Farid Bang)	2014	45	74	—		Sonny Black
"Brot Brechen" (with Shindy)	2015	87	—	—		Cla$$ic
"G$D" (with Shindy)	2015	93	—	—		Cla$$ic
"Cla$$ic" (with Shindy)	2015	62	58	75		Cla$$ic
"Fallout"	2017	69	—	—		Black Friday
"Gehen wir rein" (featuring M.O.030)	2017	65	—	—		Black Friday
"Sodom und Gomorrha"	2017	20	37	42		Black Friday
"Papa"	2017	17	26	25	BVMI: Gold	Black Friday
"Hades" (featuring Samra)	2018	8	9	8		Mythos
"Für euch alle" (featuring Samra & Capital Bra)	2018	1	1	2	BVMI: Gold	Mythos
"Mythos"	2018	18	27	22		Mythos
"Mephisto"	2018	7	11	8		Mythos
"Ronin" (with Animus)	2019	5	4	4		Carlo Cokxxx Nutten 4
"Lichter der Stadt" (with Animus)	2019	12	21	13		Carlo Cokxxx Nutten 4
"Renegade" (with Animus)	2019	28	46	38		Carlo Cokxxx Nutten 4
"2003" (with Juri)	2020	24	36	39		Non-album single

=== As featured artist ===
List of singles, with selected chart positions and certifications
Title	Year	Peak chart positions			Album
Title	Year	GER	AUT	SWI	Album
"Worldwide" (Strapt featuring Bushido)	2005	49	—	—	Los Anarchy Chaosfornia
"Gheddo" (Eko Fresh featuring Bushido)	2006	15	40	—	Hart(z) IV
"Eure Kinder" (Chakuza featuring Bushido)	2007	25	51	—	City Cobra
"Ring Frei" (Eko Fresh featuring Bushido)	2007	64	—	—	Ekaveli
"Regen" (Baba Saad featuring Bushido)	2008	67	—	—	Saadcore
"Unter der Sonne" (Chakuza featuring Bushido)	2008	38	54	—	Unter der Sonne
"Das alles ist Deutschland" (Fler featuring Bushido & Sebastian Krumbiegel)	2010	28	—	—	Flersguterjunge
"Diese Zwei" (Eko Fresh featuring Bushido)	2012	35	53	46	Ek to the Roots
"Panamera Flow" (Shindy featuring Bushido)	2013	51	51	—	NWA 2.0
"Stress ohne Grund" (Shindy featuring Bushido)	2013	19	21	45	NWA 2.0
"30-11-80" (Sido featuring (Note: Eko Fresh, Lakmann One, Laas Unltd., Nazar, Frauenarzt, Manny Marc, Bushido, BK, Olli Banjo, Tarek, Smudo, Erick Sermon, MoTrip, Moses Pelham, B.S.H, Afrob, Dr. Renz & B-Tight))	2013	—	—	—	30-11-80
"Sterne" (Shindy featuring Bushido)	2014	40	42	—	FVCKB!TCHE$GETMONE¥
"BLN" (Ali Bumaye featuring Bushido)	2015	—	—	—	Fette Unterhaltung
"Best Friends" (Ali Bumaye featuring Bushido)	2016	—	—	—	Rumble in the Jungle
"Statements" (Shindy featuring Bushido)	2016	67	63	83	Dreams
"—" denotes items which were not released in that country or failed to chart.

== Other charted songs ==
List of other charted songs, with chart positions
Title	Year	Peak chart positions			Album
Title	Year	GER	AUT	SWI	Album
"Fotzen"	2014	56	63	57	Sonny Black
"Jeder meiner Freunde"	2014	58	70	73	Sonny Black
"Mitten in der Nacht"	2014	64	—	—	Sonny Black
"AMG" (featuring Shindy)	2014	83	—	—	Sonny Black
"Nie ein Rapper"	2014	81	—	68	Sonny Black
"Butterfly Effect"	2015	43	51	—	Carlo Cokxxx Nutten 3
"Junge"	2015	55	—	—	Carlo Cokxxx Nutten 3
"Kommt Zeit kommt Rat"	2015	63	—	—	Carlo Cokxxx Nutten 3
"Gangsta Gangsta"	2015	72	—	—	Carlo Cokxxx Nutten 3
"Immer noch 2015"	2015	54	63	—	Carlo Cokxxx Nutten 3
"POV"	2015	53	73	—	Carlo Cokxxx Nutten 3
"Tempelhofer Junge"	2015	56	68	—	Carlo Cokxxx Nutten 3
"Wenn der Beat nicht mehr läuft"	2015	68	—	—	Carlo Cokxxx Nutten 3
"Sonny und die Gang"	2015	67	74	—	Carlo Cokxxx Nutten 3
"Schluss mit Gerede"	2015	77	—	—	Carlo Cokxxx Nutten 3
"Lila Scheine lügen nicht"	2015	85	—	—	Carlo Cokxxx Nutten 3
"Ich muss gucken wo ich bleib"	2015	97	—	—	Carlo Cokxxx Nutten 3
"Butterfly Effect"	2017	28	43	26	Black Friday
"Moonwalk"	2017	34	51	—	Black Friday
"Echte Berliner" (featuring AK Ausserkontrolle)	2017	40	67	—	Black Friday
"Oma Lise"	2017	42	52	33	Black Friday
"CCNDNA"	2017	43	54	31	Black Friday
"Geschlossene Gesellschaft"	2017	46	—	—	Black Friday
"Switch Stance" (featuring Laas Unltd.)	2017	61	—	—	Black Friday
"So Lange"	2017	63	—	—	Black Friday
"Ground Zero"	2017	71	—	—	Black Friday
"Angst" (featuring Ali Bumaye)	2017	73	—	—	Black Friday
"Inshallah" (featuring Capital Bra)	2018	3	3	2	Mythos
"Stiche"	2018	45	49	35	Mythos
"Zeit"	2018	65	66	—	Mythos
"Das Leben"	2018	68	61	38	Mythos
"Hyänen"	2018	70	60	—	Mythos
"Est. 1998"	2018	71	71	—	Mythos
"Geigenkoffer"	2018	74	—	—	Mythos
"Graues Haar"	2018	81	—	—	Mythos
"Unsterblichkeit" (featuring Akon)	2018	95	—	—	Mythos
"Kein Ende"	2018	100	—	—	Mythos

== Guest appearances ==
List of non-single guest appearances, showing other performing artists
Title	Year	Other artist(s)	Album
"Kingz Live"	2000	King Orgasmus One	Es gibt kein Battle
"SüdRapStarz"	2000	King Orgasmus One, Frauenarzt	Es gibt kein Battle
"Keine Liebe"	2001	D-Bo	Deutscha Playa
"Ein Tag mit BMW"	2001	D-Bo, Bass Sultan Hengzt	Deutscha Playa
"Lautlos und unausweichlich"	2001	D-Bo	Deutscha Playa
"Mein Penis ist ein Blutegel"	2001	King Orgasmus One	Tag der Abrechnung
"Gangster Gangster"	2001	King Orgasmus, Die Sekte, FDS, Tequal, Unterleib Dynamo, Bass Sultan Hengzt	Tag der Abrechnung
"Mit Ruhe und Gemütlichkeit"	2002	King Orgasmus One, Tanga Lilly	Berlin bleibt hart
"Du Pussy"	2002	Bass Sultan Hengzt	Berlin bleibt hart
"Shady!!!"	2002	King Orgasmus One	Mein Kampf – Musik für Männer
"Wir benutzen Parfüm"	2002	King Orgasmus One, Dent, Bass Sultan Hengzt	Mein Kampf – Musik für Männer
"Plan B"	2003	B-Tight, Bendt, Sido	Der Neger (in mir)
"Aussenseiter"	2004	MC Bogy, Rako	Der Atzenkeeper
"Kopf hoch (STI Remix)"	2004	Jonesmann, Azad	Macht, Käse, Flows, Cash
"Grossstadtdschungel"	2005	Bass Sultan Hengzt	Rap braucht immer noch kein Abitur
"Flerräter"	2005	Eko Fresh	Fick immer noch deine Story
"Chakuza Remix"	2006	Chakuza	Suchen & Zerstören
"Endlich wieder"	2006	Chakuza, Saad	Suchen & Zerstören
"Prost auf dich"	2006	Saad	Das Leben ist Saad
"Carlo Cokxxx Nutten Flavour"	2006	Saad	Das Leben ist Saad
"Geben und Nehmen"	2007	Nyze, Chakuza	Geben & Nehmen
"Drei"	2008	Saad, D-Bo	Saadcore
"La Familia"	2008	Saad, Kay One	Saadcore
"Blaulicht bei Nacht"	2010	Fler	Flersguterjunge
"Flersguterjunge"	2010	Fler	Flersguterjunge
"Mit dem BMW"	2010	Fler	Flersguterjunge
"Lagerfeld Flow"	2012	Kay One, Shindy	Prince of Belvedair
"Boss"	2012	Kay One	Prince of Belvedair
"Immer immer mehr"	2013	Shindy	NWA
"Springfield"	2013	Shindy	NWA
"Springfield 2"	2013	Shindy	NWA 2.0
"Stress mit Grund"	2013	Shindy, Haftbefehl	NWA 2.0
"Tango Cash"	2013	Eko Fresh	Eksodus
"Goodfellas"	2014	Farid Bang	Killa
"Bang Bang"	2014	Shindy	FVCKB!TCHE$GETMONE¥
"Nikotin & Alkohol"	2014	Shindy	FVCKB!TCHE$GETMONE¥
"Einer von den Guten"	2015	Genetikk	Achter Tag
"Attitude"	2016	Fler, Shindy	Vibe
"Art of War"	2016	Shindy	Dreams
"Maybach"	2018	Capital Bra	Allein

== Music videos ==
Title	Year	Director(s)
"Aggro Ansage Teil 2" (feat. B-Tight & Sido)	2002	
"Electrofaust / Bei Nacht"	2003	
"Electro Ghetto"	2004	
"Nie wieder"	2004	
"Worldwide" (Strapt feat. Bushido)	2005	
"Hoffnung stirbt zuletzt" (feat. Cassandra Steen)	2005	
"Nie ein Rapper" (with Saad)	2005	
"Endgegner"	2005	
"Nemesis" (feat. Eko Fresh, Chakuza, Saad, D-Bo, Billy & DJ Stickle)	2005	

- 2006: Augenblick
- 2006: Gheddo (feat. Eko Fresh)
- 2006: Von der Skyline zum Bordstein zurück
- 2006: Sonnenbank Flavour
- 2006: Vendetta (feat. Eko Fresh & Chakuza)
- 2007: Geben & nehmen (feat. Nyze, Chakuza)
- 2007: Janine
- 2007: Ring frei (feat. Eko Fresh)
- 2007: Eure Kinder (feat. Chakuza)
- 2007: Alles verloren
- 2007: Reich mir nicht deine Hand
- 2007: Alles Gute kommt von unten (feat. Chakuza, Kay One)
- 2008: Unter der Sonne (feat. Chakuza)
- 2008: Regen (feat. Saad)
- 2008: Ching Ching
- 2008: Für immer jung (feat. Karel Gott)
- 2009: Kennst du die Stars? (feat. Oliver Pocher)
- 2009: Ein letztes Mal (feat. Nyze)
- 2009: Eine Chance/Zu Gangsta (with Fler)
- 2010: Alles wird gut
- 2010: Style und das Geld (feat. Kay One)
- 2010: Das alles ist Deutschland (feat. Fler)
- 2010: Zeiten ändern dich
- 2010: Berlins Most Wanted (with Fler, Kay One)
- 2010: Weg eines Kriegers (with Fler, Kay One)
- 2010: Für immer jung (feat. Karel Gott) (2010 Version)
- 2011: Vergiss mich (feat. J-Luv)
- 2011: Wärst du immer noch hier?
- 2011: So mach ich es (with Sido)
- 2011: Erwachsen sein (with Sido feat. Peter Maffay)
- 2012: Intro
- 2012: Kleine Bushidos
- 2012: Theorie & Praxis (feat. JokA)
- 2013: Panamera Flow (feat. Shindy)
- 2013: Stress ohne Grund (feat. Shindy)
- 2013: 30-11-80 (feat. Various Artists)
- 2013: Leben und Tod des kenneth Glöckler
- 2013: Mitten in der Nacht
- 2014: Gangsta Rap Kings (feat. Kollegah & Farid Bang)
- 2014: Jeder meiner Freunde
