= Chakuza discography =

The discography of Austrian producer and rapper Chakuza.

== Studio albums ==
Year	Details	Peak chart positions			Sales
Year	Details	AUT	GER	SWI	Sales
2007	City Cobra: Released: 2007; Label: ersguterjunge; Formats: CD, digital download	41	10	—	
2008	Unter der Sonne: Released: 2008; Label: ersguterjunge; Formats: CD, digital download	13	9	29	
2010	Monster in mir: Released: 2010; Label: ersguterjunge; Formats: CD, digital download	3	8	26	
2013	Magnolia: Released: 2013; Label: Four Music; Formats: CD, digital download	3	5	10	
2014	EXIT: Released: 2014; Label: Four Music; Formats: CD, digital download	4	3	10	
2016	NOAH: Released: 2016; Label: Four Music; Formats: CD, digital download	3	5	17	
2019	Aurora MC: Released: 26 July 2019; Label: Self-released; Formats: CD, digital download	13	22	—	
2019	Aurora MC: Released: 4 October 2019; Label: Mehrs als Musik; Formats: CD, digital download	60	—	—	
"—" denotes items which were not released in that country or failed to chart.

== Mixtapes ==
Year	Album details	Peak chart positions		
Year	Album details	AUT	GER	SWI
2006	Suchen & Zerstören: Released: 2006; Label: ersguterjunge; Formats: CD, digital download	—	50	—
2006	Blackout (with Bizzy Montana): Released: 2006; Label: ersguterjunge; Formats: CD, digital download	—	69	—
2010	Suchen & Zerstören II: Released: 2010; Label: Formats: CD, digital download	36	—	—
2017	Blackout 2 (with Bizzy Montana): Released: 2017; Label: Formats: CD, digital download	9	7	33
2018	Suchen und zerstören 3: Released: 16 February 2018; Label: Wolfpack Entertainment; Formats: CD, digital download	9	11	33
"—" denotes releases that did not chart.

== Extended plays ==
Year	Details	Peak chart positions		
Year	Details	AUT	GER	SWI
2003	Verbales Fadenkreuz (with Verbale Systematik): Released: 2003; Label: Format: CD	—	—	—
2019	Aurora: Released: 2019; Label: Four Music; Format: CD	10	36	29

== Compilations ==
Year	Details	Peak chart positions			Sales	Certifications
Year	Details	AUT	GER	SWI	Sales	Certifications
2006	Nemesis – ersguterjunge Sampler Vol. 1: Various artists; Released: 2006; Label: ersguterjunge; Formats: CD, digital download	26	4	64		
2006	Vendetta – ersguterjunge Sampler Vol. 2: Various artists; Released: 2006; Label: ersguterjunge; Formats: CD, digital download	20	7	84	Germany: 100,000+	Germany: Gold
2007	Alles Gute kommt von unten – ersguterjunge Sampler Vol. 3: Various artists; Released: 2007; Label: ersguterjunge; Formats: CD, digital download	15	8	—		
"—" denotes items which were not released in that country or failed to chart.

== Singles ==
=== As lead artist ===
Year	Title	Chart positions			Album
Year	Title	AUT	GER	SWI	Album
2007	"Eure Kinder" (feat. Bushido)	51	25	—	City Cobra
2007	"Sollten alle untergehen"	—	72	—	City Cobra
2008	"Unter der Sonne" (feat. Bushido)	54	38	—	Unter der Sonne
2010	"Monster"	—	—	—	Monster in Mir
2011	"Salem II"	69	—	—	non-album track
2013	"Dieser eine Song"	67	73	—	Magnolia
2014	"Drescheibe"	—	97	—	EXIT
2014	"OFF"	69	80	—	EXIT
2014	"Charlie Brown	66	83	—	EXIT
2016	"Wien"	—	—	—	NOAH
2016	"Dings"	—	—	—	NOAH
2016	"Gold"	—	—	—	NOAH
2016	"Mond"	—	—	—	NOAH

=== Collaboration singles ===
Year	Title	Chart Positions			Album
Year	Title	AUT	GER	SWI	Album
2006	"Vendetta" (with Bushido & Eko Fresh)	53	32	—	Vendetta – ersguterjunge Sampler Vol. 2
2007	"Alles Gute kommt von unten" (with Bushido & Kay One)	68	57	—	Alles Gute kommt von unten – ersguterjunge Sampler Vol. 3

=== As featured performer ===
Year	Title	Chart Positions			Album
Year	Title	AUT	GER	SWI	Album
2008	"Für das Volk" (Tarééc feat. Chakuza)	—	—	—	Hoffnung

== Free tracks ==
Year	Title	Info(s)
2005	"Chakuza"	
2005	"Hand im Feuer" (Hand in the fire)	
2005	"Sieh mich an"	
2006	"Kein Ausweg" (No escape) (with Bushido & Bizzy Montana)	Released on Juice CD #63.
2007	"Geben und Nehmen" (To give and receive) (with Nyze & Bushido)	Internet exclusive.; A music video has been shot to the song.
2007	"Was wollt ihr"	
2008	"N.T.M." (feat. Raf & Joshimizu)	
2008	"Alarmsignal"	Release on Juice CD #86.
2008	"Behind Blue Eyes" (feat. Bizzy Montana)	Contains a sample of "Behind Blue Eyes" by The Who/Limp Bizkit; Released on MySpace.
2008	"Paparazzi" (with Raf Camora)	Released on MySpace
2009	"Ghetto Boyz" (with Mac Tyer)	Released on Juice CD #95
2009	"Falling Down"	
2009	"Jungle Drum Mix"	Contains a sample of "Jungle Drum" by Emilíana Torrini.
2010	"Ikarus" (feat. David Asphalt)	
2010	"Das allerletzte Mal" (The very last time) (with Raf Camora)	
2010	"Wir gehen die Wände hoch" (We drive up the wall) (feat. Sonnik Boom)	
2010	"BF Anthem"	Released on Juice CD #106
2010	"Hiphop.de Exclusive" (feat. David Asphalt)	Contains a sample of "No Diggity" by Blackstreet featuring Dr. Dre and Queen Pen.
2010	"Eines Tages" (One day)	16bars Exclusive
2010	"Die Nach der Tour Depression" (The after the tour depression) (feat. David Asphalt)	
2010	"Halt die Fresse" (Shut up)	
2011	"Salem II (Spendensong für Japan)" (Donation song for Japan)	Released on his website and later as single; A donation song dedicated to the earthquake in Japan.
2013	"Hurrikan" (produced by Steddy)	
