= Sonny Black (album) =

Studio album by Bushido
- Released: 14 February 2014
- Length: 49:09
- Labels: ersguterjunge; Sony Music
- Producers: Bushido; Shindy; Beatzarre; Djorkaeff; Young Piano; M3; DJ Desue; X-plosive

Bushido chronology
AMYF (2012)	Sonny Black (2014)	Carlo Cokxxx Nutten 3 (2015)

Sonny Black is the tenth studio album by German rapper Bushido, released on 14 February 2014 by ersguterjunge and distributed by Sony Music. The title Sonny Black refers to Bushido's pseudonym that he prominently used on the Carlo Cokxxx Nutten albums.

The album reached number 1 on the German, Austrian and Swiss music charts.

== Music and lyrics ==
Most of the album's songs were produced by Bushido, Shindy, Djorkaeff and Beatzarre. The team was joined by fellow music producers DJ Desue, X-plosive, Young Piano and M3, who also participated in the album production. Young Piano worked with the team on the tracks "Blei-Patronen", "Crackdealer Sound", "Haifisch" and "Messerstecherei". X-plosive produced one song on the album, titled "Tausend Gründe". DJ Desue was responsible for the scratches on "Mitten in der Nacht" and "Jeder meiner Freunde". He also produced the song "Sporttasche". The bonus song "Sonny", only available on the box-set edition, was produced by M3.

The lyrics for the album were written by Bushido, except for "Gangsta Rap Kings" written by Bushido, Kollegah and Farid Bang, and "AMG" written by Bushido & Shindy.

The album can be associated with the hip hop genres gangsta rap and battle rap. It is characterized in particular by the stylization of Bushido's image and the explicit violence. The song "Nie ein Rapper II" is a sequel to the 2005 single "Nie ein Rapper" with Baba Saad from Carlo Cokxxx Nutten II. The song "Osama Flow" is based on his 2006 single "Sonnenbank Flavour".

Throughout the album Bushido insults various recording artists, politicians and other celebrities, including Kay One, Oliver Brodowski (Kay One's stepfather and manager), Culcha Candela, Heino, Volker Beck, Oliver Pocher, Markus Lanz, Klaus Wowereit and others.

The song "Haifisch" gained some media attention by a line that is directed at BVB football trainer Jürgen Klopp, as following (translated from German into English): "Jürgen Klopp in Birkenstock [shoes]. Funny, funny when I shut him up with my belt". Following that, BVB media spokesman Sascha Fligge reacted to this by following statement: "For Borussia Dortmund nothing is more important than football. And nothing less important than such non-issues".

== Indexing ==
On 30 April 2015, the German Federal Department for Media Harmful to Young Persons 'indexed' (essentially banned) the album, with the accusation as it apparently discriminates women and homosexuals, glorifying the criminal lifestyle and its brutalize effect on younger persons.

== Track listing ==
No.	Title	Producer(s)	Length
1.	"Fotzen" (Cunts)	Bushido, Shindy, Djorkaeff & Beatzarre	3:16
2.	"Jeder meiner Freunde" (Everyone of my friends)	Bushido, Shindy, Djorkaeff & Beatzarre	3:09
3.	"Haifisch" (Shark)	Bushido, Shindy, Djorkaeff, Beatzarre & Young Piano	3:31
4.	"Mitten in der Nacht" (Middle of the night)	Bushido, Shindy, Djorkaeff, Beatzarre & DJ Desue	3:55
5.	"Crackdealer Sound"	Bushido, Shindy, Djorkaeff, Beatzarre & Young Piano	3:17
6.	"Sporttasche" (Sports bag)	DJ Desue	3:25
7.	"Osama Flow"	Bushido, Shindy, Djorkaeff & Beatzarre	3:02
8.	"Gangsta Rap Kings" (featuring Kollegah & Farid Bang)	Bushido, Shindy, Djorkaeff & Beatzarre	4:03
9.	"Messerstecherei" (Knife fight)	Bushido, Shindy, Djorkaeff, Beatzarre & Young Piano	2:50
10.	"Blei-Patronen" (Lead cartridges)	Bushido, Shindy, Djorkaeff, Beatzarre & Young Piano	3:40
11.	"John Wayne"	Bushido, Shindy, Djorkaeff & Beatzarre	2:44
12.	"Tausend Gründe" (Thousand reasons)	X-plosive	3:06
13.	"Baseballschläger" (Baseball bat)	Bushido, Shindy, Djorkaeff & Beatzarre	2:53
14.	"AMG" (featuring Shindy)	Bushido, Shindy, Djorkaeff & Beatzarre	2:49
15.	"Nie ein Rapper II" (Never a rapper II)	Bushido, Shindy, Djorkaeff & Beatzarre	3:29

Box-set (bonus tracks)
No.	Title	Producer(s)	Length
16.	"Polizeigriff" (Wristlock)	Bushido, Shindy, Djorkaeff & Beatzarre	3:18
17.	"Sturmmaske" (Sky mask)	Bushido, Shindy, Djorkaeff & Beatzarre	3:07
18.	"Sonny"	M3	3:17

== Charts ==
=== Weekly charts ===
Chart (2014)	Peak position
Austrian Albums (Ö3 Austria)	1
German Albums (Offizielle Top 100)	1
Swiss Albums (Schweizer Hitparade)	1

=== Year-end charts ===
Chart (2014)	Position
Austrian Albums (Ö3 Austria)	31
German Albums (Offizielle Top 100)	26
Swiss Albums (Schweizer Hitparade)	23

== Certifications ==
Region	Certification	Certified units/sales
Austria (IFPI Austria)	Gold	7,500^{*}
Germany (BVMI)	Gold	100,000^{^}
Switzerland (IFPI Switzerland)	Gold	10,000^{^}
^{*} Sales figures based on certification alone.^{^} Shipments figures based on certification alone.

== Sources ==
- http://www.bild.de/unterhaltung/musik/bushido/album-sonny-black-auf-index-40637762.bild.html
- Sonny Black (album) at Discogs
