= Shindy discography =

Artist discography

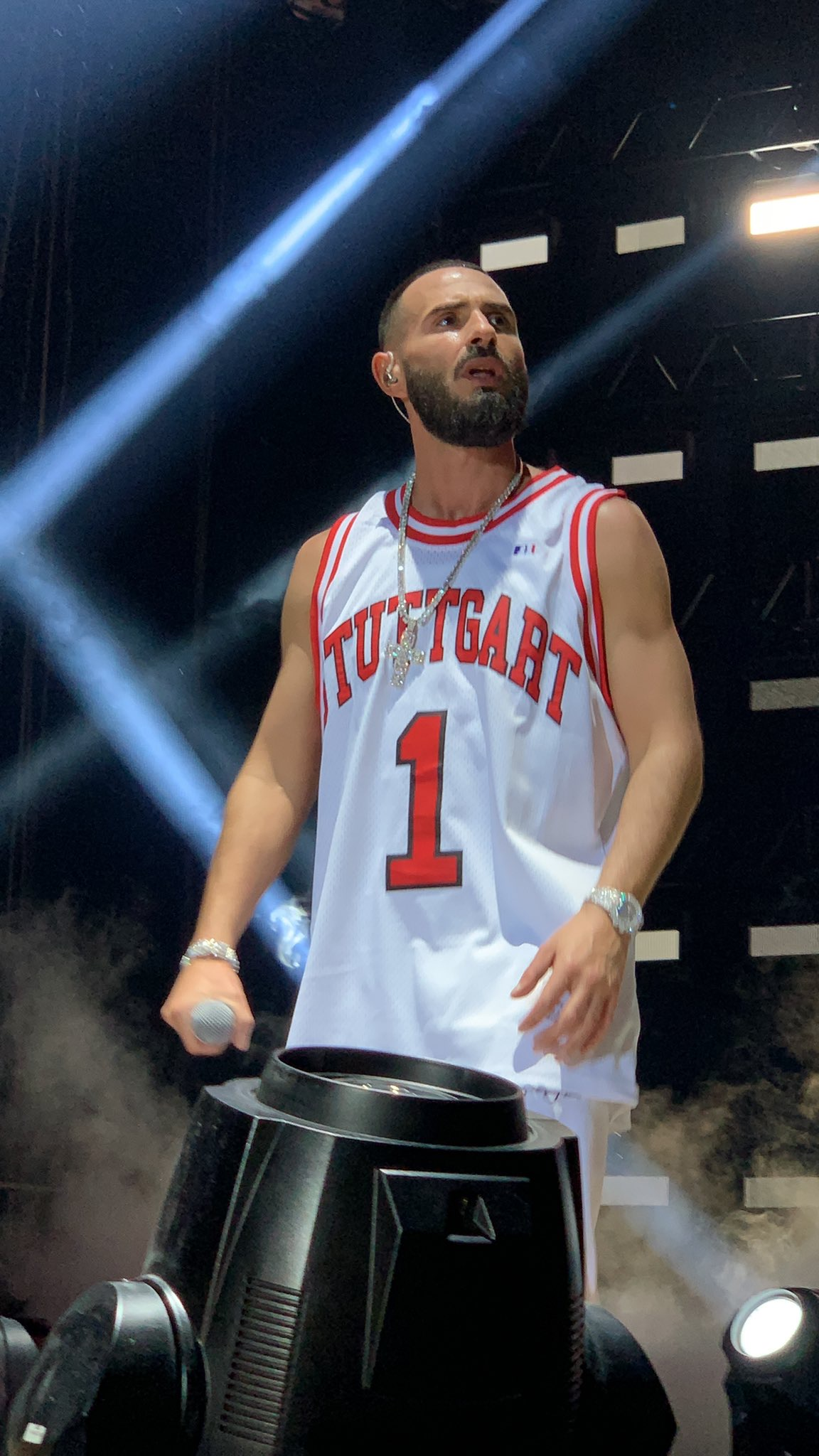
Shindy (Michael Schindler)

The discography of German rapper Shindy consists of five studio albums, one collaboration album, seventeen singles and five music videos.

== Albums ==
=== Studio albums ===
List of studio albums, with chart positions, sales figures and certifications
Title	Album details	Peak chart positions			Certifications
Title	Album details	GER	AUT	SWI	Certifications
NWA	Released: 12 July 2013; Label: ersguterjunge; Formats: CD, digital download	1	1	3	BVMI: Gold
NWA 2.0	Released: 2 August 2013; Label: ersguterjunge; Formats: CD, digital download	6	—	—	
FvckB!tche$GetMone¥	Released: 10 October 2014; Label: ersguterjunge; Formats: CD, digital download	1	1	1	BVMI: Gold
Dreams	Released: 11 November 2016; Label: ersguterjunge; Formats: CD, digital download	1	1	1	BVMI: Gold; IFPI AUT: Gold
Drama	Released: 12 July 2019; Label: Friends with Money; Formats: CD, Digital download, streaming	1	2	2	BVMI: Gold
In meiner Blüte	Released: 16 June 2023; Label: Friends with Money; Formats: CD, Digital download, streaming	4	2	3	

=== Collaboration albums ===
List of studio albums, with chart positions, sales figures and certifications
Title	Album details	Peak chart positions			Certifications
Title	Album details	GER	AUT	SWI	Certifications
Cla$$ic (with Bushido)	Released: 6 November 2015; Label: ersguterjunge; Formats: CD, digital download	1	1	1	BVMI: Gold; IFPI AUT: Gold; IFPI SWI: Gold

== Singles ==
=== As lead artist ===
Year	Single	Peak positions			Album
Year	Single	GER	AUT	SWI	Album
2013	"Immer immer mehr" (feat. Bushido & Sido)	–	62	–	NWA
2013	"Springfield" (feat. Bushido)	88	–	–	NWA
2013	"Stress ohne Grund" (feat. Bushido)	19	21	45	NWA
2013	"Stress mit Grund" (feat. Bushido & Haftbefehl)	21	27	31	NWA 2.0
2013	"Springfield 2" (feat. Bushido)	37	42	49	NWA 2.0
2013	"Mein Shit"	52	55	–	NWA 2.0
2013	"Bruce Wayne" (feat. Eko Fresh)	50	54	63	NWA 2.0
2014	"Sterne" (feat. Bushido)	40	42	–	FVCKB!TCHE$GETMONE¥
2014	"JFK"	56	69	–	FVCKB!TCHE$GETMONE¥
2014	"Julius Caesar"	71	–	–	FVCKB!TCHE$GETMONE¥
2015	"Shindy x Balkan Mix"	33	48	71	
2016	"Roli"	14	26	38	DREAMS
2016	"Statements" (feat. Bushido)	67	63	83	DREAMS
2016	"Dreams"	93	–	–	DREAMS
2016	"Art of War" (feat. Bushido)	–	–	98	DREAMS
2019	"Dodi"	1	1	1	Drama
2019	"Road2Goat"	5	10	14	Non-album single
2019	"Affalterbach" (feat. Shirin David)	3	3	10	Drama
2019	"Nautilus"	2	2	2	Drama
2019	"EFH"	8	9	16	Drama
2019	"Raffaello"	4	8	9	Drama
2019	"Tiffany"	6	8	8	Non-album singles
2020	"554"	12	15	30	Non-album singles
2020	"Hood" (with AK Ausserkontrolle)	10	15	28	Non-album singles
2020	"What's Luv"	3	6	6	Byzantinische Rose
2020	"Sony Pictures"	25	23	23	Byzantinische Rose
2020	"KMDF" (with Haftbefehl)	15	28	33	Das weisse Album
2020	"Crispy"	28	35	39	Non-album singles
2020	"Morning Sun" (with OZ)	8	20	13	Non-album singles
2021	"Im Schatten der Feigenbäume"	5	9	4	Non-album singles
2021	"Mandarinen"	1	7	5	Non-album singles

=== Other charted songs ===
List of other charted songs, with chart positions
Title	Year	Peak chart positions			Album
Title	Year	GER	AUT	SWI	Album
"Babygirl"	2019	18	21	21	Drama
"Babyblau"	2019	19	24	27	Drama
"Drama"	2019	27	—	—	Drama
"Rapsuperstar"	2019	28	—	—	Drama
"Bietigheim Sunshine"	2019	30	—	—	Drama
"Honigtopf"	2019	32	—	—	Drama
"MMM"	2019	37	—	—	Drama
"Shoot"	2019	43	—	—	Drama
"Oud Interlude"	2019	98	—	—	Drama
"—" denotes a release that did not chart or was not released in that territory.

=== Collaboration singles ===
Year	Single	Peak positions			Album
Year	Single	GER	AUT	SWI	Album
2015	"Cla$$ic" (with Bushido)	62	58	75	Cla$$ic
2015	"Brot brechen" (with Bushido)	87	–	–	Cla$$ic
2015	"G$D" (with Bushido)	93	–	–	Cla$$ic

=== As featured performer ===
Year	Single	Peak positions			Album
Year	Single	GER	AUT	SWI	Album
2012	"Finale wir kommen" (Kay One feat. Shindy)	29	–	–	
2013	"Panamera Flow" (Bushido feat. Shindy)	51	51	31	Bonus track on NWA
2014	"AMG" (Bushido feat. Shindy)	83	–	–	Sonny Black
2016	"Sex ohne Grund" (Ali Bumaye feat. Shindy)	27	42	–	Rumble in the Jungle
2016	"Kimbo Slice" (Ali Bumaye feat. Bushido & Shindy)	76	–	–	Rumble in the Jungle
2017	"Moonwalk" (Bushido feat. Shindy)	34	51	–	Black Friday
2021	"SYGL" (Cro featuring Shindy)	9	9	33	Trip

== Freetracks ==
- 2006: "Playboys (Mambo No. '06)"
- 2007: "Die flippen aus" (feat. Jaysus)
- 2009: "Jasmin"
- 2009: "Das rappst du nicht du Spast" (feat. Jaysus)
- 2010: "Ich hab's halt"
- 2011: "Der Grieche aus dem Süden"
- 2012: "Crime Payz"
- 2012: "Hugo Boss" (with Kay One)
- 2012: "Bad Boyz 4 Life" (with Kay One & Blacklife)
- 2012: "Crime Payz Millionäre" (with Kay One & Crime Payz)
- 2012: "Sunnyboys" (with Kay One) (Vega & Fard Diss)
- 2013: "Alkoholisierte Pädophile" (diss track against Kay One)
- 2014: "JFK" (Video Version)
- 2015: "Zu Fett" as producent for Ali Bumaye on Juice CD #128

== Guest appearances ==
- 2006: "Gangsta of Love" (Jaysus feat. Shindy & NDG) in König im Süden
- 2007: "Sonnenbrille Nachts" (Jaysus feat. Shindy & Musiye) in Der Erste Tag vom Rest meines Lebens
- 2011: "Backpacker laber' nicht" (Musiye feat. Shindy, Dimar & Assos) in Rapaganda
- 2011: "Stück von mir" (Shindy) in Rapaganda
- 2011: "Lass' mir meine Ehre" (Shindy feat. Assos & Israel) in Rapaganda
- 2011: "Egoist" (Jaysus feat. Shindy) in Narzischwein
- 2012: "Sportsfreund" (Kay One feat. Shindy) in Prince of Belvedair
- 2012: "Lagerfeld Flow" (Kay One feat. Bushido & Shindy) in Prince of Belvedair
- 2012: "Villa auf Hawaii" (Kay One feat. Shindy) in Prince of Belvedair
- 2013: "Gangsta Squad" (Eko Fresh feat. MoTrip, Ali A$, Shindy, Jeyz & Tatwaffe) in Eksodus
- 2013: "Ritz Carlton" (Capo feat. Shindy) in Hallo Monaco
