= Zeiten ändern dich =

- Directed by: Uli Edel
- Written by: Bushido; Bernd Eichinger
- Based on: Bushido by Bushido
- Produced by: Bernd Eichinger; Brian Grazer; Jimmy Iovine
- Starring: Bushido; Elyas M'Barek; Moritz Bleibtreu; Hannelore Elsner; Mina Tander; Karoline Schuch; Katja Flint; Uwe Ochsenknecht; Fler; Kay One; Nyze
- Cinematography: Rainer Klausmann
- Edited by: Hans Funck
- Music by: Bushido
- Production company: Rat Pack Filmproduktion
- Distributed by: Constantin Film
- Release date: 4 February 2010
- Running time: 94 minutes
- Country: Germany
- Language: German

Zeiten ändern dich (English title Time You Change) is a German biographical film directed by Uli Edel and starring rapper Bushido, as well as Elyas M'Barek and Moritz Bleibtreu. The film is based on Bushido's 2008 autobiography. The film premiered in Berlin on 3 February 2010.

== Plot ==
During a performance tour in Germany, Anis Ferchichi aka Bushido celebrates his birthday with his crew on the tour bus. Ferchichi gets a letter from his father Ayech. This brings back memories of his difficult childhood in Berlin, which are then shown through flashbacks.

Ferchichi spends his childhood in a deprived area of Berlin with his Tunisian father Ayech, German mother Luise and younger brother Sercan. He grows up in a violent environment and often watches Ayech beating Luise. He is a poor student but embraces music. He goes to college and leaves his girlfriend after she has been unfaithful to him. He earns a lot of money selling drugs and celebrates his success as a drug dealer at a party, where he meets Selina, who becomes his new girlfriend. One day, drug dealers break into the apartment Ferchichi shares with his family, tie up Luise and Sercan, ransack their possessions and steal their money. After this experience, Ferchichi spends more time with his friends.

Years later, Ferchichi, now an adult, starts freestyle rapping with his friends, including Patrick Losensky aka Fler. A video game inspires Ferchichi to call himself Bushido. He and Losensky sign a record contract with the record label Hardcore Berlin, based on Aggro Berlin. Bushido eventually leaves Hardcore Berlin after a dispute with his manager Arafat Abou-Chaker.

== Cast ==
- Bushido as Himself
  - Elyas M'Barek as Young Bushido
  - Emilio Sakraya as Child Bushido
- Moritz Bleibtreu as Arafat Abou-Chaker
- Karoline Schuch as Selina
- Hannelore Elsner as Luise Maria Engel
  - Mina Tander as Young Luise Maria Engel
- Katja Flint as Selina's Mother
- Uwe Ochsenknecht as Selina's Father
- Karel Gott as Himself
- Kay One as Himself
- Fler as Himself
- Adolfo Assor as Ayech Ferchichi
  - Murat Yilmaz as Young Ayech Ferchichi
- Martin Semmelrogge as Tattooist
- Werner Daehn as Police Officer
- Tristan Seith as Skull Pal

== Production ==
Karel Gott appears and performs the song "Für immer jung" at the Brandenburger Tor alongside Bushido. Martin Semmelrogge has a cameo appearance as a tattoo artist. Fler designed the graffiti appearing in the film. In the film, Aggro Berlin is called Hardcore Berlin and Sido is called Skull Pal (Tristan Seith).

== Soundtrack ==
Information taken from the film's end credits.

Songs taken from Bushido albums:

- "Zeiten ändern sich" and "Reich mir nicht deine Hand" (from 7)
- "Electrofaust" credited as "Dein Bezirk" (Rap Acappella) (from Vom Bordstein bis zur Skyline)
- "4, 3, 2, 1 (Vielen Dank Aggro Berlin)" and "Für immer jung" (feat. Karel Gott) (from Heavy Metal Payback)
- "Intro" (from King of KingZ)

Other songs:

- "Freestyle" – Bushido
- "Weißt du wohin" – Karel Gott
- "Beats" – Bushido feat. Sissi Boo
- "Die Biene Maja" – Karel Gott
- "Go Get It" – Calvin Samuel, Josh Kessler, Keith Salandy & Marc Ferrari
- "Belly Dancer" – Philippe Guez
- "Nomad's Land" – Philippe Guez
- "Gangsta" – Derrick Carolina, Jahmal Durham & Mack Tompkins
- "After The Violence" – Andrea Coclough
- "Bedouin Life" – Robert Joseph Walsh
- "Jail Time" – Jack Elliot
- "Let Me See You Move" – Eliot Pulse & Ray Mitti
- "Baza" – George Fenion & John Herbert Leach
- "Boogie" – Stephan "Gudze" Hinz
