= Tarééc =

German singer of Lebanese-Palestinian origin

- Birth name: Tarek Hussein
- Also known as: T-Soul
- Born: 3 July 1978 (age 47); Berlin, Germany
- Genres: R&B
- Occupation: Singer
- Years active: 1996–present

Tarek Hussein (born 3 July 1978), better known by his stage name Tarééc, is a German R&B singer of Lebanese and Palestinian descent. He was previously part of the German boy band The Boyz where he was known as T-Soul.

== The Boyz ==
Through the talent show Blonds Talent Award, Hussein got discovered and shortly thereafter made his first studio recording and became a member of the boy band The Boyz in 1996. The group included himself under the name "T-Soul", as well as Florian Fischer ("Flow"), Adel Tawil ("Kane"), Salvatore Di Blasi, and Stephane Claudio Kroll-Marongiu. The Boyz released two studio albums, Boyz in da House in 1997 and Next Level in 1998. Their single "One Minute" attained gold status. They split up in 1999.

== Solo career ==
After the dissolution of The Boyz, Tarek fell into depression and became a drug addict. As part of his therapy, his psychologist advised him to express feelings and experiences in writing, Tarek started writing lyrics to possible songs and composed music for them.

In April 2007, Hussein adopting the stage name Tarééc signed a contract with ersguterjunge, a hip-hop record label. He had been a childhood friend of Arafat, an act signed to the label. The Boyz member Adel Tawil was also part of the label which helped him get introduced. His first release on the label was a free downloadable track "Ich halte deine Hand" ("I hold your hand") with rapper Bushido.

In November 2008, Tarééc released the single "Für das Volk" ("for the people") featuring Austrian rapper Chakuza. In the music video released, Bushido, Adel Tawil, Oliver Petszokat, Bizzy Montana and DJ Stickle are featured. The video was shot in a football field as a nod to Tarééc's earlier sports career. This was followed by the second single "Tränen lügen nicht" ("tears don't lie").

On 8 May 2009, Tarééc debut solo album Hoffnung ("hope") was released, that included his two released singles and many guest contributions from the other rappers signed to the ersguterjunge label, most notably German rapper Nyze and Austrian rapper Chakuza. Many of the tracks were produced by Trackworks Productions, related to his former bandmate Adel Tawil. In February 2010, Tarééc left the label through mutual consensus, without excluding further cooperation.

== Discography ==
=== Albums ===
- 2009: Hoffnung

=== Singles ===
- 2008: "Für das Volk" feat. Chakuza
- 2009: "Tränen lügen nicht"
