= Zeiten ändern dich (album) =

Studio album by Bushido
- Released: 19 February 2010
- Recorded: 2009–2010
- Genres: Hip hop, rap
- Label: ersguterjunge
- Producers: Bushido; Martin Stock; Beatzarre; Djorkaeff

Bushido chronology
Carlo Cokxxx Nutten 2 (2009)	Zeiten ändern dich (2010)	Berlins Most Wanted (2010)

Singles from Zeiten ändern dich
- 1. "Alles wird gut" Released: 5 February 2010; 2. "Zeiten ändern dich" Released: 6 August 2010

Professional ratings
Review scores
Source	Rating
AllMusic	4/5 stars
laut.de	4/5 stars

Zeiten ändern dich ("[The] Times Change You") is the seventh solo album by German rapper Bushido and also the soundtrack of his movie Zeiten ändern dich. The lead single "Alles wird gut" was released on 5 February 2010 and the second single "Zeiten ändern dich" on 6 August 2010.

== Track listing ==
No.	Title	Producer(s)	Length
1.	"Intro"	Djorkaeff & Beatzarre	2:03
2.	"Zeiten ändern dich" (Times change you)	Bushido & Martin Stock	3:34
3.	"Ein Mann Armee" (One man army)	Bushido & Martin Stock	3:42
4.	"23 Stunden Zelle" (23 hours cell)	Bushido & Martin Stock	3:13
5.	"Lichtlein" (Little light)	Bushido & Martin Stock	3:23
6.	"Airmax auf Beton" (Airmax on concrete) (featuring Fler)	Djorkaeff & Beatzarre	3:39
7.	"Alles wird gut" (Everything will be alright)	Djorkaeff & Beatzarre	3:38
8.	"Vergeben & Vergessen" (Forgive & forgotten)	Bushido & Martin Stock	3:41
9.	"Ich lass dich gehen" (I let you go)	Bushido & Martin Stock	3:26
10.	"Öffne uns die Tür" (Open the door for us) (featuring Kay One)	Bushido & Martin Stock	3:34
11.	"Es tut mir Leid" (I'm sorry)	Bushido & Martin Stock	3:40
12.	"Selina"	Bushido & Martin Stock	3:39
13.	"Steh auf" (Get up) (featuring Glashaus)		4:11
14.	"Nur für dich (Mama)" (Just for you (Mom))	Bushido & Martin Stock	3:14
15.	"Battle on the Rockz" (featuring Fler & Kay One)	Djorkaeff & Beatzarre	3:38
16.	"Wegen eines Blatt Papiers (Outro)" (Because of a sheet of paper)	Bushido & Martin Stock	3:20

Premium edition (DVD)
No.	Title	Length
1.	"Making of"
2.	"Interview"
3.	"Galerie"
4.	"Alles wird gut" (video)

Limited deluxe edition
No.	Title	Producer(s)	Length
17.	"Mit dem BMW" (With the BMW) (featuring Fler)		3:37
18.	"Ich liebe dich" (I love you) (featuring Kay One)	Djorkaeff & Beatzarre	4:03
19.	"Weg eines Kriegers" (Way of a warrior) (featuring Chakuza & Bizzy Montana)		2:23

The limited deluxe edition features a second disc that contains all the instrumentals.

== Charts ==
=== Weekly charts ===
Chart (2010)	Peak position
Austrian Albums (Ö3 Austria)	1
German Albums (Offizielle Top 100)	2
Swiss Albums (Schweizer Hitparade)	3

=== Year-end charts ===
Chart (2010)	Position
Austrian Albums (Ö3 Austria)	50
German Albums (Offizielle Top 100)	69

== Certifications ==
Region	Certification	Certified units/sales
Austria (IFPI Austria)	Gold	10,000^{*}
Germany (BVMI)	Gold	100,000^{^}
^{*} Sales figures based on certification alone.^{^} Shipments figures based on certification alone.
