= Carlo Cokxxx Nutten =

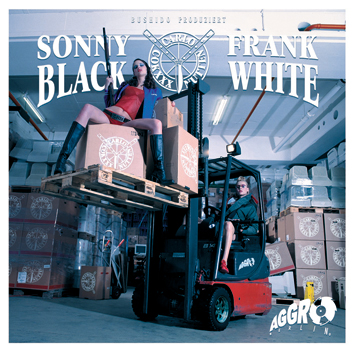

Studio album by Bushido and Fler
- Released: 21 October 2002
- Genres: German hip-hop, gangsta rap
- Length: 53:21
- Label: Aggro Berlin
- Producers: Bushido & DJ Ilan

Bushido and Fler chronology
Carlo Cokxxx Nutten (2002)	Carlo Cokxxx Nutten 2 (2009)

Bushido chronology
King of KingZ (2001)	Carlo, Cokxxx, Nutten (2002)	Vom Bordstein bis zur Skyline (2003)

Fler chronology
Carlo Cokxxx Nutten (2002)	Neue Deutsche Welle (2005)

Carlo Cokxxx Nutten ("Carlo Colucci [German fashion brand], Coke, Hookers") is an album by German rappers Bushido (alias Sonny Black) and Fler (alias Frank White). It was released on October 21, 2002 on Aggro Berlin.

== Background ==
During that time, Bushido was signed to the label, along with his mates Sido and B-Tight. The album was Fler's first professional album release and appearance in public.

Bushido produced most of the beats and used the pseudonym "Sonny Black", inspired by film Donnie Brasco that was based on Dominick Napolitano. Fler used the pseudonym "Frank White", named after the character of King of New York. For the beat production, Bushido used a MPC and DJ Ilan mixed and edited the finished songs.

The album title came from a colleague of a former graffiti group. "Carlo" stands for the brand Carlo Colucci, "Cokxxx" for cocaine, and "Nutten" for prostitutes.

The song lyrics are most about the difficult life in the ghetto, including drugs, violence, force of arms, and prostitution.

== Legacy and sequels ==
The album is regarded as one of the most influential German gangsta rap albums. It achieved the breakthrough to the German-speaking gangsta rap and also for Aggro Berlin. Bushido and Fler became widely known in the German hip hop scene through the album's success. Bushido released his debut Vom Bordstein bis zur Skyline the following year 2003, which reached number 88 in German charts.

Bushido (alias: Sonny Black) and Baba Saad released a sequel to the original, titled Carlo Cokxxx Nutten II in 2005. Saad replaced Fler due to the feud with Aggro Berlin. The album ranked #3 on the German album charts, while the lead and only single "Nie ein Rapper" ranked #24 in the German single charts.

After Aggro Berlin closed down in April 2009, Bushido and Fler ended their feud. Both artists released in September another sequel, titled Carlo Cokxxx Nutten 2. The album ranked #1 in the German album charts and the only single "Eine Chance/Zu Gangsta" ranked #26 in the German single charts.

In February 2015, after many speculations and rumors Bushido released Carlo Cokxxx Nutten 3 as his 11th studio album, without any single or music video promoting it. The album certificated gold in Germany, Austria and Schwitzerland.

== Track listing ==
No.	Title	Producer(s)	Length
1.	"Intro, Electro, Ghetto"	Bushido	2:11
2.	"Cordon Sport Massenmord" (Cordon Sport mass murder)	Bushido	3:46
3.	"Yo, peace man!"	Bushido & DJ Ilan	3:48
4.	"Miami" (Skit)	Bushido	0:49
5.	"Badewiese" (Bathing meadow)	Bushido & DJ Ilan	3:58
6.	"Carlo, Cokxxx, Nutten" (Carlo, coke, hookers)	Bushido	3:25
7.	"Warum?" (Why?) (featuring B-Tight)	Bushido & DJ Ilan	3:43
8.	"Dein Leben" (Your life)	Bushido	3:56
9.	"Geh nach Hause" (Go home)	Bushido	3:33
10.	"Drogen, Sex, Gangbang" (Drugs, sex, gang bang) (featuring King Orgasmus One)	Bushido & DJ Ilan	4:04
11.	"Cokxxx" (Skit)	Bushido	1:01
12.	"Boss"	Bushido	3:35
13.	"Wer will Krieg?" (Who wants war?)	Bushido & DJ Ilan	4:00
14.	"Schau mich an" (Look at me)	Bushido	4:10
15.	"Behindert" (Retarded)	Bushido	3:44
16.	"Sag nicht..." (Don't say...) (featuring D-Bo)	Bushido & DJ Ilan	3:44
17.	"Outro"		0:09

Samples

- "Intro, Electro, Ghetto" contains an excerpt from Full Metal Jacket
- "Cordon Sport Massenmord" contains a sample of "The Devil's Stars Burn Cold" by Endvre
- "Yo, peace man!" contains a sample of "She Is Dead" by Éric Serra
- "Badewiese" contains a sample of "Heaven's Gate" by Joe Hisaishi & "Keep It Thoro" by Prodigy
- "Carlo, Cokxxx, Nutten" contains a sample of "Viel zu viel" by Herbert Grönemeyer
- "Boss" contains a sample of "A Kaleidoscope of Mathematic" by James Horner
- "Wer will Krieg?" contains a sample of "The World Is One" by Forthcoming Fire
- "Schau mich an" contains a sample of "Nash Descends Into Parcher's World" by James Horner
- "Behindert" contains a sample of "The Cross" by Samael
