= Jaysus =

Jaysus may refer to:

- Jaysus, an Irish slang interjection and alternative name for Jesus of Nazareth
- Jaysus, a mild expletive in many languages. Also a minced oath
- Jaysus (rapper) (born 1982), German rapper of Greek origin
