= Von der Skyline zum Bordstein zurück (song) =

German rap song

Single by Bushido

from the album Von der Skyline zum Bordstein zurück
- Released: 18 August 2006
- Genre: German Rap
- Label: ersguterjunge
- Songwriters: Bushido, Duncan Patterson

Bushido singles chronology
"Gheddo" (2006)	"Von der Skyline zum Bordstein zurück" (2006)	"Sonnenbank Flavour" (2006)

"Von der Skyline zum Bordstein zurück" (German: "From the skyline back to the curb") is the title track and first single by German rapper Bushido from his album Von der Skyline zum Bordstein zurück.

The song is based on "Vom Bordstein bis zur Skyline" from the album of the same title. The hook has the same lyrics. The song contains a sample from the song "Terminal" by the band Antimatter.

The single was one of the most successful hip hop singles in Germany; it reached place 14 in the charts.

== Music video ==
The music video shows scenes where people are frozen still, as if time suddenly stops. Bushido is the only person who moves. This effect is called "Ghost".

These scenes refer to the chorus' line: "Von der Skyline zum Bordstein zurück, siehst du unsere Welt, wie sie niemals still steht" ("From the skyline back to the curb, do you see our world, how it never stands still").

The video was shot in a supermarket, roll stairs, an underground car park garage and a pub. In the underground car park Bushido leans on a BMW 7. The video reached number 1 in the TRL Top 10. This brought him a golden tape.

== Track listing ==
- Maxi Single CD1

No.	Title	Length
1.	"Von Der Skyline Zum Bordstein Zurück"	4:05
2.	"Von Der Skyline Zum Bordstein Zurück" (Instrumental)	4:05
3.	"Von Der Skyline Zum Bordstein Zurück" (Decay Remix)	3:47
4.	"Von Der Skyline Zum Bordstein Zurück" (Decay Remix Instrumental)	3:47
5.	"Von Der Skyline Zum Bordstein Zurück" (Beatlefield Remix)	3:49
6.	"Von Der Skyline Zum Bordstein Zurück" (Beatlefield Remix Instrumental)	3:48

== Sources ==
- musicline.de
