= Bisou =

German girl group

- Origin: Germany
- Genres: Pop, dance-pop, R&B
- Years active: 2007–2008
- Label: ersguterjunge
- Members: Eliana D'Ippolito; Elvira Michieva; Kristina Neuwert
- Website: bisoumusik.de

Bisou (French for "kiss") was a German girl group founded by rapper Bushido in 2007.

== History ==
All members were contestants in the fifth season of Popstars, but only two made it to the final twelve (into the so-called "Bandhaus") and none made it to the final six. At The Dome 40, they were guests to cheer for the winners of that season of Popstars, Monrose. They met Bushido, who they knew from a visit to him at the Popstar-Bandhouse, and began to talk. Bushido then came up with the idea to form them into a new band – and Bisou was born.

Bushido presented the band at The Dome 41 in March 2007, where they sang live in front of the public. They released their first single "Die erste Träne" ("The first tear"), and a week later the debut album Hier und jetzt ("Here and now") was released over Bushido's record label ersguterjunge. In October, they published the second single "Die Sonne geht auf" ("The sun rises"), but the single did not reach the charts.

Before the band sang at The Dome, Bushido wanted to keep the band as a secret; however, singer Senna Gammour from group Monrose, who knew about the secret, told it to a magazine. Elvira Michieva and Gammour met in person backstage in Bravo Supershow and after a short debate, they got into a brawl with each other. Coat hangers and rails were used as weapons and Michieva was left with Gammour's fingerprints on her neck.

== Discography ==
=== Albums ===
Title	Album details	Charts
Title	Album details	DE
Hier und jetzt	Released: 2007; Label: ersguterjunge; Format: CD	42

=== Singles ===
Title	Year	Charts	
Title	Year	DE	AT
"Die erste Träne"	2007	23	49
"Die Sonne geht auf"	2007	—	—
