= Endura (band) =

Dark ambient band

- Also known as: AbRAXAS (1993–1994)
- Genre: Dark ambient
- Years active: 1993–2002
- Past members: Stephen Pennick; Christopher Walton

Endura (sometimes written Endvra) was a dark ambient band that was active during the 1990s. The band had only two members, Stephen Pennick and Christopher Walton. The name of the band comes from the Cathars' practice of ritualistic fasting to speed death.

Pennick and Walton met in early 1993. Walton was "once chased out of France" after showing videos of hardcore violence and pornography at an industrial music festival. He has referred to himself as a misanthrope.

Endura mixes elements of ambient music with tribal rhythms, chants, moans, and sounds effects such as rattling chains and echoes. Their style has been described as "combining synthesizers reminiscent of Tangerine Dream with (un)healthy doses of Aleister Crowley, H.P. Lovecraft, and psychedelic drugs", "absolutely haunting and dark", or simply "Neoclassical". Walton has stated that Pennick has more melodic talent while Walton himself is more conceptual. After Endura dissolved Walton went on to release music under the names: Ten Horned Beast and the Holy order of Faust. Pennick according to an interview with Heathen Harvest no longer produces music.

== Partial discography ==
Year	Title	Label	Notes
1994	Hexe	Enlightenment Communications	as AbRAXAS, cassette only
1994	Dreams Of Dark Waters	Nature & Art	
1995	Dark Projections From An Ancient Nature	Psychotic Reactions	cassette only
1996	The Dark Is Light Enough	Allegoria	
1996	Liber Leviathan	Aesthetic Death	
1996	Black Eden	Red Stream	
1996	Ard Inn Ar	Old Europa Cafe	cassette only
1997	Great God Pan	Misanthropy Records/Elfenblut	
1998	The Watcher	Old Europe Cafe	
1999	Elder Signs	Red Stream	double CD set
