= Jaysus (rapper) =

German rapper

Jaysus (born in Friedrichshafen on 25 September 1982) is a German rapper of German and Greek origin.

== Chablife ==
Between 2001 and 2005, Jaysus was part of the rap band Chablife that also included Kay One and Scandaliz. Kool Savas, a prominent rapper brought them to Berlin. Upon his recommendation, Chablife got signed with Royalbunker for a record label.

== Solo ==
In 2006 he released his street album König im Süden with Shrazy Records. Juice, specializing in hip hop music chose it as "Street album of the month". He was promoted as a solo act in many rap festivals and led the names of a pan-German "Shrazy Records-Tour" as a headline act. He also helped Shindy another German rapper of Greek origin in his beginnings.

== MACHT RAP label ==
In 2008 Jaysus parted ways with Shrazy Records and in 2009 he established his own label MACHT RAP in Stuttgart with his brother Costa. Rappers on the label included Rapsta, Big Toon and for some time Musiyelage. In March 2013, his label MACHT Rap went into a distribution agreement with Warner Music Group in all German markets.

== Discography ==
=== Albums / street albums ===
- 2006: König im Süden
- 2007: Der erste Tag vom Rest meines Lebens
- 2010: Narzischwein
- 2011: Nenn mich Jay
- 2014: Gott Liebt Die Geduldigen

=== Singles ===
in Chablife

- 2004: "Chabo Mambo"
- 2004: "Ich bin ein Chabo" (Chablife feat. Eko Fresh, Manuellsen & Ramsi Aliani)
- 2004: "Eigentlich Schön" (Chablife feat. Eko Fresh & Azra)

Solo

- 2007: "Nur wegen Ihr" (feat. Israel)
- 2009: "Was für’n Mann"
- 2010: "2 gegen die Welt"
- 2011: "Seh ich gut aus"
- 2011: "Macht Rap Gang"
- 2011: "Ich hasse es zu lügen"
- 2011: "Killa Killa"

Freetracks and cooperations

(Refer to Jaysus article discography in German Wikipedia)
