= King of KingZ =

Demo album by Bushido
- Released: 2001 (original); 2003 (re-release); 2004 (extended)
- Genre: German hip hop
- Labels: 2001: I Luv Money; 2003: Aggro Berlin; 2004: ersguterjunge
- Producers: Bushido & DJ Ilan

Bushido chronology
King of KingZ (2001)	Carlo Cokxxx Nutten (2002)

King of KingZ is a demo album by German rapper Bushido, released 2001 on tape. In 2003, it was re-released by German label Aggro Berlin and subsequently banned for minors by the Federal Department for Media Harmful to Young Persons in 2005. Following the ban, Bushido's label ersguterjunge released a new edition of the album (without the banned tracks) combined with Demotape under the title King of KingZ - Demotape - Extended Version.

== Track listing ==
No.	Title	Translation	Length
1.	"Intro"		1:54
2.	"King of KingZ"		3:03
3.	"Superheroez" (featuring Kam One & Joka)		2:53
4.	"Arschfick"	Ass fuck	3:06
5.	"Ich hab' euch nicht vergessen"	I haven't forgotten you	4:34
6.	"Nutte Bounce"	Hooker bounce	3:33
7.	"Fick Rap"	Fuck rap	2:45
8.	"Mittelfingah" (featuring Bass Sultan Hengzt & King Orgasmus One)	Middle finger	2:45
9.	"Schwarze Seite" (featuring Roulette)	Dark side	3:51
10.	"Wie ein Engel"	Like an angel	3:27
11.	"Pitbull"		4:02
12.	"Kalter Krieg" (featuring Fler)	Cold war	2:50
13.	"Mit dem Schwanz in der Hand" (featuring D-Bo)	With my dick in the hand	3:35
14.	"Hast du Mut?"	Do you have courage	3:09
15.	"Vack You!" (featuring Fler)		2:18
16.	"Sternenstaub" (Bonustrack)	Star dust	3:38

Digital remastered
No.	Title	Length
17.	"King of Kingz" (ersguterremix)	3:39
18.	"Arschfick" (ersguterremix)	2:35
19.	"Mit dem Schwanz in der Hand" (ersguterremix)	3:57
20.	"Outro"	0:23

=== Extended version ===
Disc 1: King of KingZ
No.	Title	Length
1.	"Intro"	1:54
2.	"King of KingZ"	3:03
3.	"Arschfick"	3:06
4.	"Ich hab euch nicht vergessen"	4:34
5.	"Nutte Bounce"	3:33
6.	"Fick Rap"	2:45
7.	"Schwarze Seite" (featuring Roulette)	3:51
8.	"Wie ein Engel"	3:27
9.	"Pitbull"	4:02
10.	"Kalter Krieg" (featuring Fler)	2:50
11.	"Hast du Mut?"	3:09
12.	"Vack You!" (featuring Fler)	2:18
13.	"Sternenstaub"	3:41
14.	"King of KingZ" (ersguteremix)	3:39
15.	"Arschfick" (ersguteremix)	2:35
16.	"Outro"	0:23

Disc 2: Demotape
No.	Title	Translation	Length
1.	"Intro"		1:29
2.	"Schlangen"	Snakes	3:30
3.	"Illusion" (featuring Fabrice)		5:09
4.	"Westliche Kammer" (featuring Vader)	West chamber	5:29
5.	"Es tut weh"	It hurts	3:21
6.	"Ich würde..."	I would...	4:23
7.	"10 vor 12" (featuring Vader)	10 [minutes] to 12	3:16
8.	"The Crew" (featuring Vader)		4:25
9.	"Neues Kapitel" (featuring Roulette)	New chapter	3:43
10.	"Sei ehrlich"	Be honest	3:34
11.	"Allstars" (featuring DMC, Fabrice & Vader)		4:50
12.	"West-Berlin Untergrund" (featuring King Orgasmus One)	West Berlin underground	4:25
13.	"Auf der Jagd" (featuring King Orgasmus One)	On the hunt	4:06
14.	"Outro"		1:28

== Samples ==
- "Mittelfingah" contains a sample of "Mourning Palace" by Dimmu Borgir
- "Pitbull" contains a sample of "Gathering of the Storm" by Arcana
- "Kalter Krieg" contains a sample of "The Phantom of the Opera" by Andrew Lloyd Webber
- "Schlangen" contains a sample of "Sweet Talkin Woman" by ELO
- "Allstars" contains a sample of "Thug Muzik" by Mobb Deep
- "Ich wurde" contains a sample of "Promethee" by Akhenaton
- "Hast du mut?" contains a sample of "Prelude - in the Wake of Walpurga's" by Shinjuku Thief
- "Arschfick (Ersguteremix)" contains a sample of the music in the movie Mean Machine (approx. 9 minutes, 19 seconds into the movie)
