= Vendetta – ersguterjunge Sampler Vol. 2 =

Compilation album by ersguterjunge
- Released: 2006
- Genre: German hip hop
- Label: ersguterjunge

Ersguterjunge chronology
Nemesis – ersguterjunge Sampler Vol. 1 (2006)	Vendetta – ersguterjunge Sampler Vol. 2 (2006)	Alles Gute kommt von unten – ersguterjunge Sampler Vol. 3 (2007)

Vendetta – ersguterjunge Sampler Vol. 2 is the second compilation album by the artists signed to German hip hop label ersguterjunge.

== Track listing ==
#	Title	Performer(s)	Producer(s)	Length
01	"Intro"	Bushido		
02	"Vendetta"	Chakuza, Eko Fresh & Bushido		
03	"Centercourt"	Baba Saad		
04	"Bist du bereit?" ("Are you ready?")	Bizzy Montana & D-Bo		
05	"Spotlight"	Nyze		
06	"Ich pack dich am Schopf" ("I grab you by the shock [of hair])"	Summer Cem & Bushido		
07	"V wie Vendetta" ("V for Vendetta")	Chakuza		
08	"Der Pate" ("The godfather")	Baba Saad & Nyze		
09	"Träne aus Blut" ("Tear of blood")	Bizzy Montana & Bushido		
10	"Was sein muss, muss sein" ("What must be, must be")	Eko Fresh		
11	"Fliegen" ("Flying")	Chakuza & Bizzy Montana		
12	"Schicht im Schacht" ("That's it")	Summer Cem		
13	"Hustle & Flow"	Bizzy Montana		
14	"Korrekt" ("Correct")	Nyze, Bushido & Baba Saad		
15	"Was ist das?" ("What is this?")	D-Bo		
16	"Was soll das sein?" ("What should it be?")	Nyze & Chakuza		
17	"Eine Nummer für sich" ("A number for itself")	Bushido		
18	"Outro"			

Limited edition
No.	Title	Performer(s)	Length
1.	"Blut, Herz, Ehre & Stolz"	Nyze & D-Bo	04:01
2.	"Der Bruchteil einer Minute"	Bushido, Chakuza, Eko Fresh	04:05
3.	"Nichts wert"	Nyze	03:37
4.	"Ich fliege über Rap"	D-Bo	04:03

Samples

- "Eine Nummer für sich" contains a sample of "Perdition" by Dark Sanctuary

== Charts ==
=== Weekly charts ===
Chart (2006)	Peak position
Austrian Albums (Ö3 Austria)	20
German Albums (Offizielle Top 100)	7
Swiss Albums (Schweizer Hitparade)	84

=== Year-end charts ===
Chart (2007)	Position
German Albums (Offizielle Top 100)	100
