= Sonnenbank Flavour =

Single by Bushido

from the album Von der Skyline zum Bordstein zurück
- Released: 27 October 2006
- Genre: Hip hop
- Label: ersguterjunge
- Songwriters: Bushido, Michael Moss, Duncan Patterson
- Producer: Bushido

Bushido singles chronology
"Von der Skyline zum Bordstein zurück" (2006)	"Sonnenbank Flavour" (2006)	"Vendetta" (2006)

"Sonnenbank Flavour" ("Sunbed flavour") is a song by German rapper Bushido and the second single from his album Von der Skyline zum Bordstein zurück. It uses a sample from the song "Epitaph" by the British rock band Antimatter. In 2007, the song's music video was nominated for the Echo Music Award in the category Best Video, but lost to "Der letzte Tag" by Tokio Hotel.

== Background ==
In the song, Bushido uses single words that rhyme instead of complete sentences. Bushido confirmed in an interview that he wanted, besides twenty normal tracks, another track that sounde formed different. He also said that on paper, it does not make sense at first glance, but when people listen to it they will understand what's going on. The song was featured on his album Von der Skyline zum Bordstein zurück.

The single reached spot 15 in the German charts.

== Controversy ==
The line "Doreen, Maskenmann, AIDS-Test: positiv" ("Doreen, Maskman, AIDS test: positive") mocks Doreen Steinert and Sido, who were a couple that time. In an interview with Patrice Bouédibéla on MTV Urban, Bushido first denied it and said that he meant the man in his video who wears a Goofy mask, but then he admitted it by calling both Steinert and Sido "embarrassing".

In the song, Bushido also took aim at Raptile, Rapsoul and Curse, as well as Bass Sultan Hengzt and his label Amstaff Muzx.

== Music video ==
The music video was directed by Hinrich Pflug and produced by Katapult. It released on 20 October 2006 and premiered at MTV-TRL. The video was shot in a studio with a blue-screen background.

To produce a video that fit to the song lyrics, the shots were switched during Bushido's performance to the objects or persons which were mentioned; in addition, the background switches between the colours white and black. Eko Fresh and Baba Saad also made cameo appearances.
