= Shindy =

German rapper

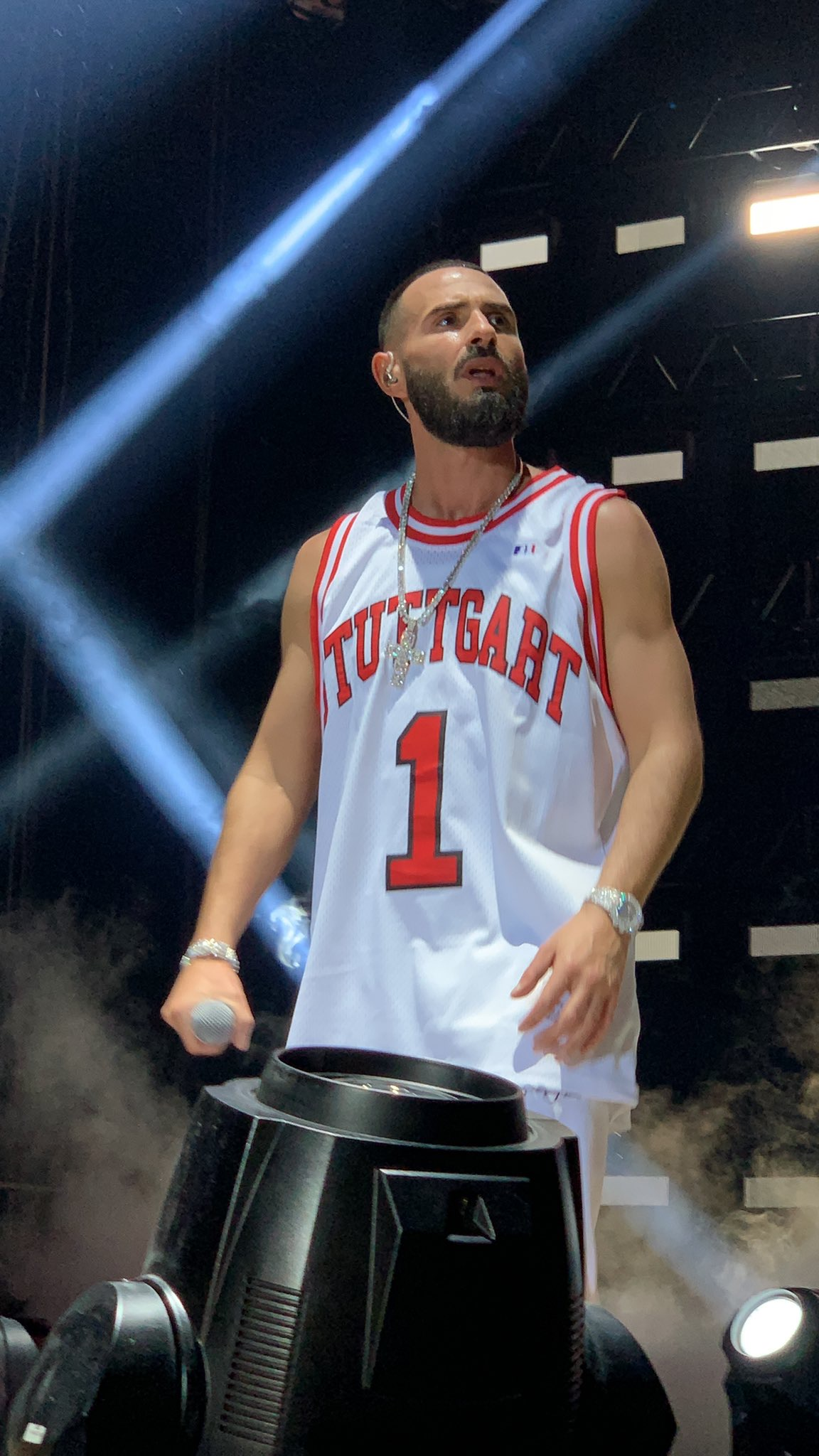
- Shindy in 2020

Background information
- Born: Michael Schindler; 7 September 1988 (age 38); Stuttgart Bad Cannstatt, West Germany
- Genres: German rap; gangsta rap; trap; pop rap; drill
- Occupation: Rapper
- Years active: 2012–2017, 2019–present
- Labels: Friends with Money, ersguterjunge (previously)

Michael Schindler (born 7 September 1988), better known by his stage name Shindy, is a German rapper. After leaving Friends with Money and ersguterjunge, he was signed to Sony Music Entertainment until 2023 and then moved to Universal Music.

== Life and career ==
=== 1988: Early life ===
Schindler was born to a German father and a Greek mother. He spent his childhood working in a restaurant run by his Greek grandparents. He began rapping at age 14 and by 16 was noticed by Greek-German rapper Jaysus who invited him to contribute some tracks with him.

=== 2012: Collaborations ===
In 2012, Shindy was signed to Kay One's label. He gained popular fame through Kay One's album Prince of Belvedair where Shindy was featured on some tracks. Shindy's big popularity came when featured on Kay One's chant in support of the Germany national football team titled "Finale wir kommen". After one more single together, he parted ways in unfriendly terms with Kay One allying himself with Bushido and Bushido's rap label ersguterjunge, at the same time issuing a diss track against Kay One.

=== 2013: NWA and breakthrough ===
On 21 June 2013, he released the single "Immer immer mehr" with Bushido and Sido, which was followed by the release of his debut album NWA on July 12, 2013, with the initials denoting "Nie wieder arbeiten" (meaning "never work again"). The album topped the German and Austrian charts and reaching Top 3 in Switzerland.

=== 2019: Drama and mainstream popularity ===
After two years of absence from the media, mainly due to disputes with his old record label, Shindy came back with the lead single DODI from his album Drama released later that year. Shortly after he released the songs Road2Goat and Affalterbach. With the release of the single Nautilus on 11 May 2019, Shindy gained much more mainstream recognition. The song officially entered the charts on 17 May 2019 and reached number 2 on the German charts. In 2021, he announced the release of his next studio album In meiner Blüte for November, but delayed the release because he had problems with his label.

=== 2022: Release of In meiner Blüte ===
In 2022, Shindy signed with Sony Music Entertainment and again announced the release of In meiner Blüte, this time for of September 2022. He released the two singles Mami Freestyle and Hot Summer, but the album was delayed again and later released on 16 June 2023. Between March and May 2023 he released the three singles Geld machen Jung, Bayern Freestyle and Cent'anni. The album debuted at fourth place on the German charts. It also had a guest appearance from Nate Dogg on the track How Come?. The posthumous feature came about through Sony Music's contacts with rapper Daz Dillinger, who was a companion of Nate Dogg.

== Discography ==
=== Studio albums ===
- NWA (2013)
- NWA 2.0 (2013)
- FVCKB!TCHES$GETMONE¥ (2014)
- Dreams (2016)
- Drama (2019)
- In meiner Blüte (2023)
- <3 MY PEOPLE (2025)

=== Collaborations ===
- CLA$$IC (with Bushido) (2015)

== Awards and nominations ==
=== Results ===
Year	Award	Nomination	Work	Result	Ref.
2013	HipHop.de Awards	Best Newcomer National	Himself	Won	
2015	Echo Awards	Hip-Hop / Urban National	FVCKB!TCHE$GETMONE¥	Nominated	
2015	HipHop.de Awards	Best Producer National	Himself & Bushido, Beatzarre, Djorkaeff	Won	
2015	HipHop.de Awards	Best Punchline	G$D	Nominated	
2016	HipHop.de Awards	Best Producer National	Himself & OZ	Nominated	
2017	Echo Awards	Hip-Hop / Urban National	Dreams	Nominated	
2019	HipHop.de Awards	Best Song National	DODI	Nominated	
2019	HipHop.de Awards	Lyricist of the Year	Himself	Nominated	
2019	HipHop.de Awards	Best Album National	Drama	Nominated	
2019	HipHop.de Awards	Best Line	DODI	Won	
2019	Bravo Otto Awards	Hip-Hop National	Himself	Nominated	
2019	Hype Awards	Hype Video	DODI	Won	
2019	Hype Awards	Best Line	DODI	Won	
2020	HipHop.de Awards	Best Live-Act National	Himself	Nominated	
2020	HipHop.de Awards	Best Line	554	Nominated	
2022	HipHop.de Awards	Best Song National	Hot Summer	Pending	
2022	HipHop.de Awards	Beat of the Year	Mami Freestyle (prod. by Efro)	Pending	
