= Vom Bordstein bis zur Skyline =

Studio album by Bushido
- Released: 14 July 2003
- Genre: German hip-hop
- Length: 69:32
- Label: Aggro Berlin
- Producers: DJ Ilan, Bushido, Sido

Bushido chronology
Carlo Cokxxx Nutten (2002)	Vom Bordstein bis zur Skyline (2003)	Electro Ghetto (2004)

Singles from Vom Bordstein bis zur Skyline
- 1. "Bei Nacht" Released: 25 May 2003; 2. "Gemein wie 10" Released: 9 November 2003

Professional ratings
Review scores
Source	Rating
AllMusic	4.5/5 stars
laut.de	5/5 stars
hiphop-jam.net	4.5/5 stars

Vom Bordstein bis zur Skyline ("From the Curb to the Skyline") is the debut studio album by German rapper Bushido. It was released on 14 July 2003 by independent label Aggro Berlin. The album was later banned for minors by the Federal Department for Media Harmful to Young Persons due to its controversial lyrics. It was produced by Bushido and DJ Ilan and reached number 88 in the German Media Control Charts.

== Banning ==
On 6 April 2005, the youth welfare office from Trier-Saarburg proposed to 'index' the album, which would have meant a ban of the album for minors. Bushido and Aggro Berlin intervened prior to the meeting and argued with artistic freedom.

The songs "Eine Kugel reicht", "Tempelhof Rock", "Dreckstück" and "Pussy" have since been indexed. The lyrics of these songs contain discriminatory passages towards homosexuals, disabled people, and women. The following text passage in "Dreckstück" has been heavily criticized (translated from German into English): "Only because you are a woman and can get fucked in the stomach, do not mean that I can't beat you up until you are blue".

The song lyrics are mostly about violence, crime, sexism, and discrimination. On 30 September 2005, the album was indexed by the Federal Department for Media Harmful to Young Persons. Since then, it is not allowed to sell the album to people below the age of 18.

== Legacy ==
The album was cited alongside Carlo Cokxxx Nutten as one of the influential German-speaking gangsta rap albums and meant a breakthrough for German gangsta rap and Aggro Berlin. Bushido's album was the first one of the label that entered the German Charts, reaching number 88.

The album was Bushido's last full-length release for Aggro Berlin. It came to disputes with the bosses of the label, and in 2004, Bushido left the label and started his own career by forming ersguterjunge.

Many fans consider Vom Bordstein bis zur Skyline as Bushido's best album and as a "milestone" in German hip-hop history. In an interview with Süddeutsche Zeitung in 2011, fellow German rapper Casper called Vom Bordstein bis zur Skyline as "one of the most important German rap records of all time". Felix Brummer, lead vocalist of the band Kraftklub, named the album one of the five most influential German rap albums of all time in an interview with 16Bars.

== Track listing ==
No.	Title	Producer(s)	Length
1.	"Electrofaust" (Electro fist)	DJ Ilan	2:12
2.	"Bushido" (featuring Billy13)	Bushido	4:49
3.	"Bei Nacht" (At Night)	Bushido	3:23
4.	"Berlin"	Bushido	3:13
5.	"Vaterland" (Fatherland) (featuring Fler)	Bushido	3:21
6.	"Eine Kugel reicht" (One bullet is enough)	DJ Ilan	4:48
7.	"Pitch Bitch"	Bushido & DJ Ilan	0:42
8.	"Mein Revier" (My hood) (featuring Fler)	Bushido & DJ Ilan	4:44
9.	"Renn" (Run) (featuring A.i.d.S)	Sido	4:35
10.	"Gemein wie 10" (Mean like 10)	Bushido & DJ Ilan	3:50
11.	"Streetwars"	Bushido	0:34
12.	"Tempelhof Rock" (featuring Joek2)	Bushido	4:07
13.	"Asphalt" (featuring Fler)	Bushido	4:04
14.	"Stupid White Man" (featuring Sahira)	Bushido	4:42
15.	"Zukunft" (Future) (featuring Fler)		3:44
16.	"Dreckstück" (Bitch) (featuring Fler)	Bushido	5:23
17.	"Pussy"	Bushido	4:19
18.	"Vom Bordstein bis zur Skyline" (From the curb to the skyline) (featuring Fler)	Bushido	3:52
19.	"Outro" (featuring Sahira)	Bushido & DJ Ilan	3:02

== Samples ==
A sample list is available here.

- "Electrofaust"
  - "Drunken Master Theme" by Chow Fu-Liang
  - Excerpts from Drunken Master
- "Bushido"
  - Excerpt from American History X
- "Berlin"
  - "Shadow of Doubt" by Yoko Kanno
- "Vaterland"
  - "What U Rep" by Prodigy feat. Noreaga
- "Pitch Bitch"
  - "Aoi Hitomi" by Yoko Kanno
  - "Memory of Fanelia" by Yoko Kanno
- "Mein Revier"
  - "Sweet Dreams" by Eurythmics
- "Gemein wie 10"
  - Excerpt from American History X
- "Tempelhof Rock"
  - "G.O.D. Pt. III (Remix)" by Mobb Deep
  - "Odin's Day" by L'Orchestre Noir
  - "The Grimy Way" by Big Noyd feat. Prodigy
- "Asphalt"
  - "Hades "Pluton" by Sopor Aeternus
- "Stupid White Man"
  - "Welcome to the Real World" by Don Davis
- "Zukunft"
  - "J'y suis jamais allé" by Yann Tiersen
- "Dreckstück"
  - "Sieh', mein Geliebter, hier hab' ich Gift" by Sopor Aeternus
- "Pussy"
  - Vocal excerpts from Kobe Tai
  - "Or A Wolf' by Philip Glass & Kronos Quartet
- "Vom Bordstein bis zur Skyline"
  - "Consensual Words" by Delerium
- "Outro"
  - "Love Theme from The Robe" by Felix Slatkin and The Fantastic Strings
