= Eine Chance/Zu Gangsta =

Single by Bushido and Fler

from the album Carlo Cokxxx Nutten 2
- Released: 2009
- Genre: Gangsta rap
- Label: ersguterjunge
- Songwriter(s): Bushido & Fler
- Producer(s): Bushido

Bushido and Fler singles chronology
"Kennst du die Stars" (2009)	"Eine Chance/Zu Gangsta" (2009)	"Alles wird gut" (2010)

"Eine Chance/Zu Gangsta" (German for "One chance"/"Too gangsta") is a double A-side single by the German rappers Bushido and Fler off their 2009 album Carlo Cokxxx Nutten 2. "Zu Gangsta" contains a short sample of Cassidy's "I'm a Hustla".

== Music video ==
For the video had Bushido the idea for replaying their reconciliation. "We replay, how we met after the dispute. Everything is seen from a paparazzi view", said Fler to Bravo HipHop Special.

The video opens with Bushido hanging out with friends in a café and calling Fler in his private home. He answered the call and Bushido told him. During their short conservation, both rappers got secretly photographed, before they left their locations. Throughout the video they got chased and stalked by paparazzi, while outstanding people interpret criminal business. Finally Fler and Bushido got arrested and taken to the interrogation, where they performed the first part of "Zu Gangsta". The ending shows both rappers leaving the police station, where a lot of journalist and reporters waiting for them.

=== Controversy ===
After the first shoots of the video, in Pallasseum a big apartment house in Schöneberg, Fler drove in a white VW Van with the film team and two friends to the next location. As they stopped at a traffic lights, a silver Volvo stopped next to them and four men attacked them armed with knives, one machine gun (with blank ammunitions) and nightsticks. Fler and the others could escape without being harmed. "I'm glad that in the machine gun were just blank ammunitions", told Fler seriously the magazine Bravo HipHop Special, "but nobody realized it in the first moment". The car was slightly damaged: it has a bump and the car door was winged out of the hinges. "When I saw the gun, I was frightened to death", said Fler.
