= Chakuza =

Austrian rapper

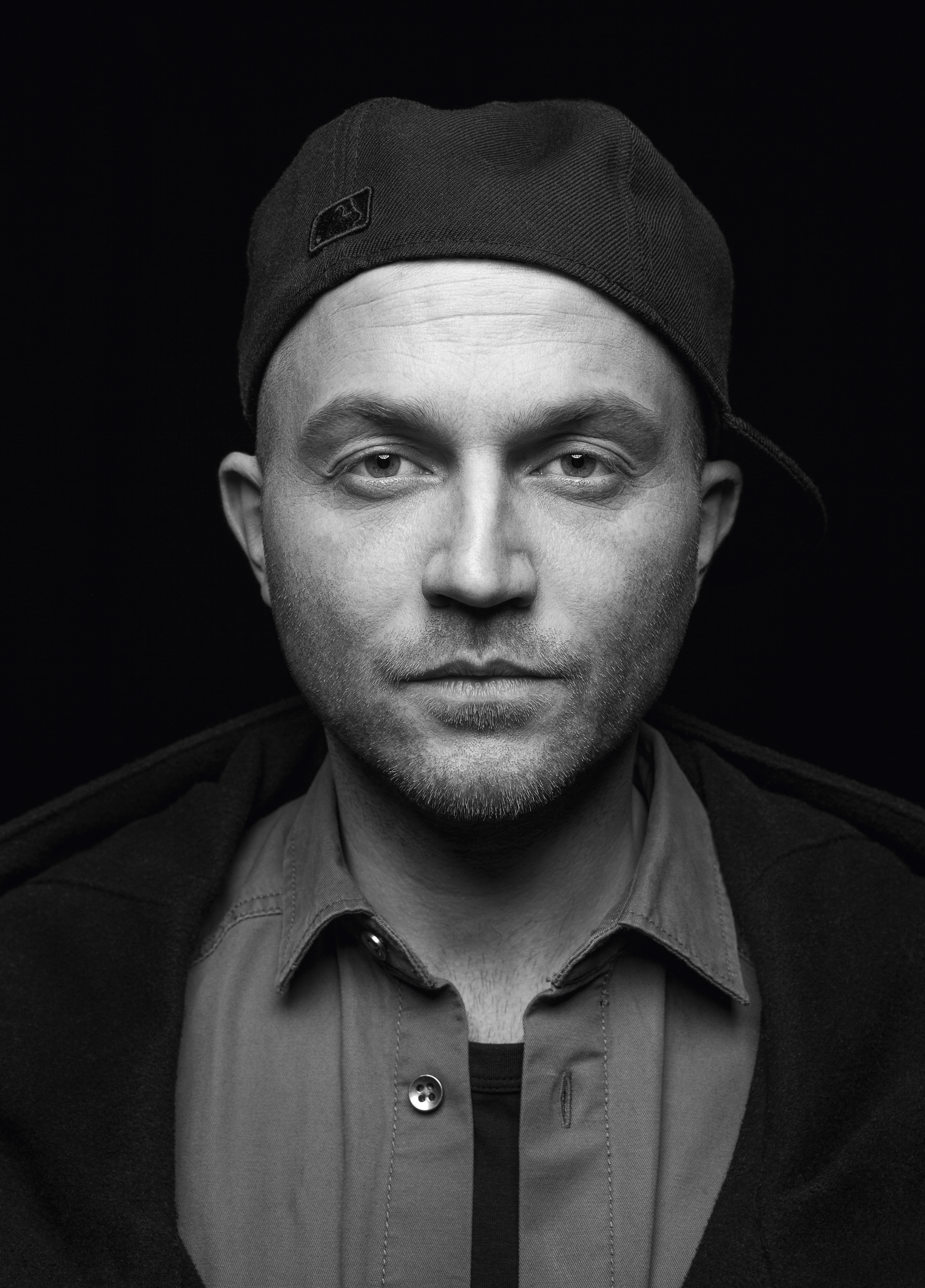

Background information
- Born: Peter Pangerl; 22 February 1981 (age 45); Linz, Austria
- Genres: Hip hop
- Occupations: Rapper, producer
- Label: Four Music
- Member of: Beatlefield

Peter Pangerl (born 22 February 1981), better known as Chakuza, is an Austrian rapper.

== Career ==
After finishing an apprenticeship to become chef, he teamed up with DJ Stickle and MC J and formed the hip hop group Verbale Systematik. When MC J left the group in 2002, they changed their name to Beatlefield and became a production duo.

In 2005, the two of them approached Bushido and handed him a demo tape of theirs, which consisted of numerous beats and one song. At about the same time Austrian police had taken Bushido in because of battery allegations, and during the trial the rapper was not allowed to leave Austria. This resulted in Bushido temporarily living at Chakuza's place and further in the signing of Chakuza and DJ Stickle to Bushido's label ersguterjunge.

In November 2012, it was announced that Chakuza had been signed to Four Music. His fourth solo album Magnolia was released in March 2013 and featured a more non-electronic, songwriter attitude than the previous ones.

== Discography ==
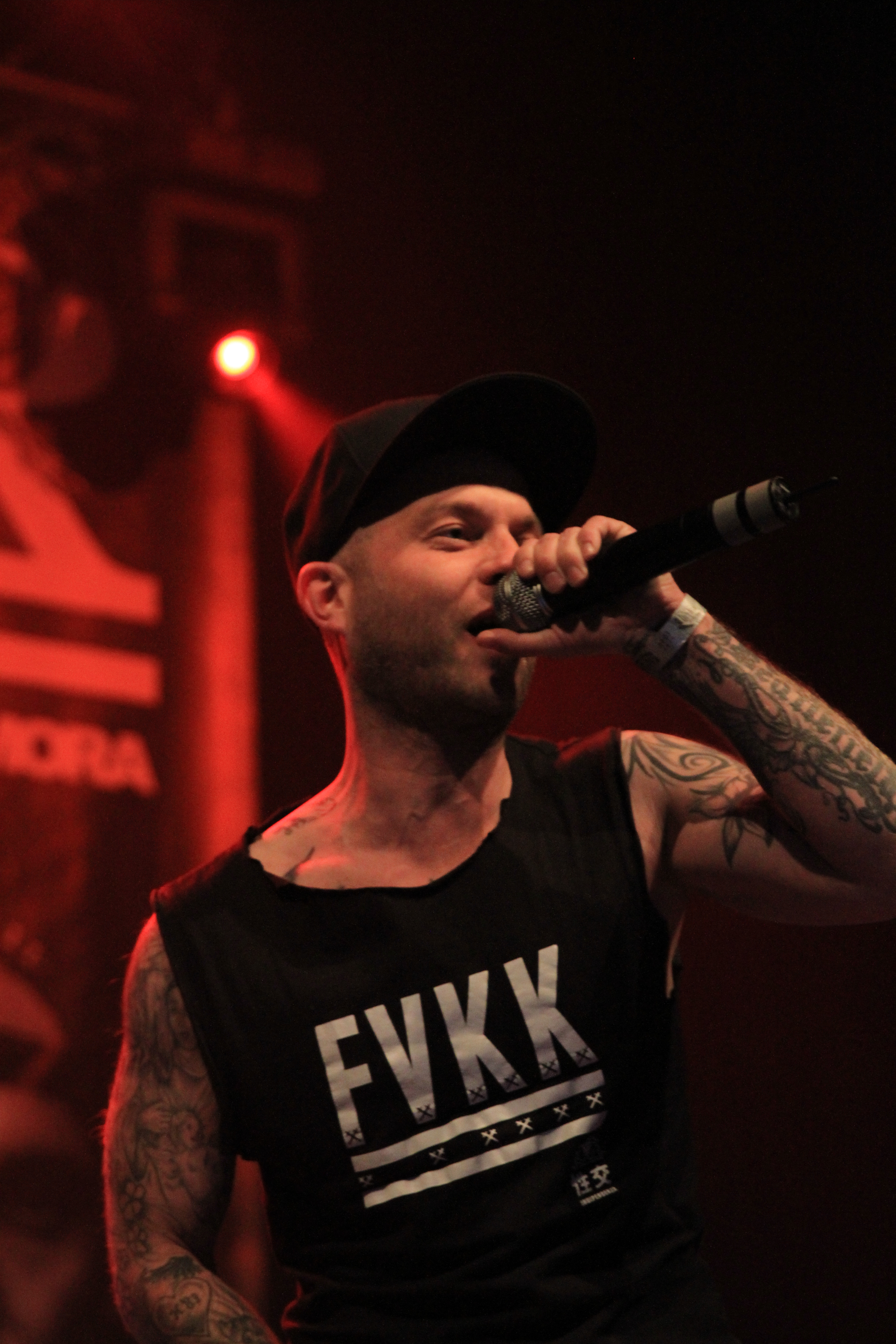
Chakuza performing in 2014

- Suchen & Zerstören (2006)
- City Cobra (2007)
- Unter der Sonne (2008)
- Monster in mir (2010)
- Suchen & Zerstören 2 (2010)
- Magnolia (2013)
- Zodiak (2014) [collaboration with RAF Camora and Joshi Mizu]
- Exit (2014)
- Noah (2016)
- Suchen und Zerstören 3 (2018)
- Aurora MC (2019)
