= Bushido (rapper) =

German rapper (born 1978)

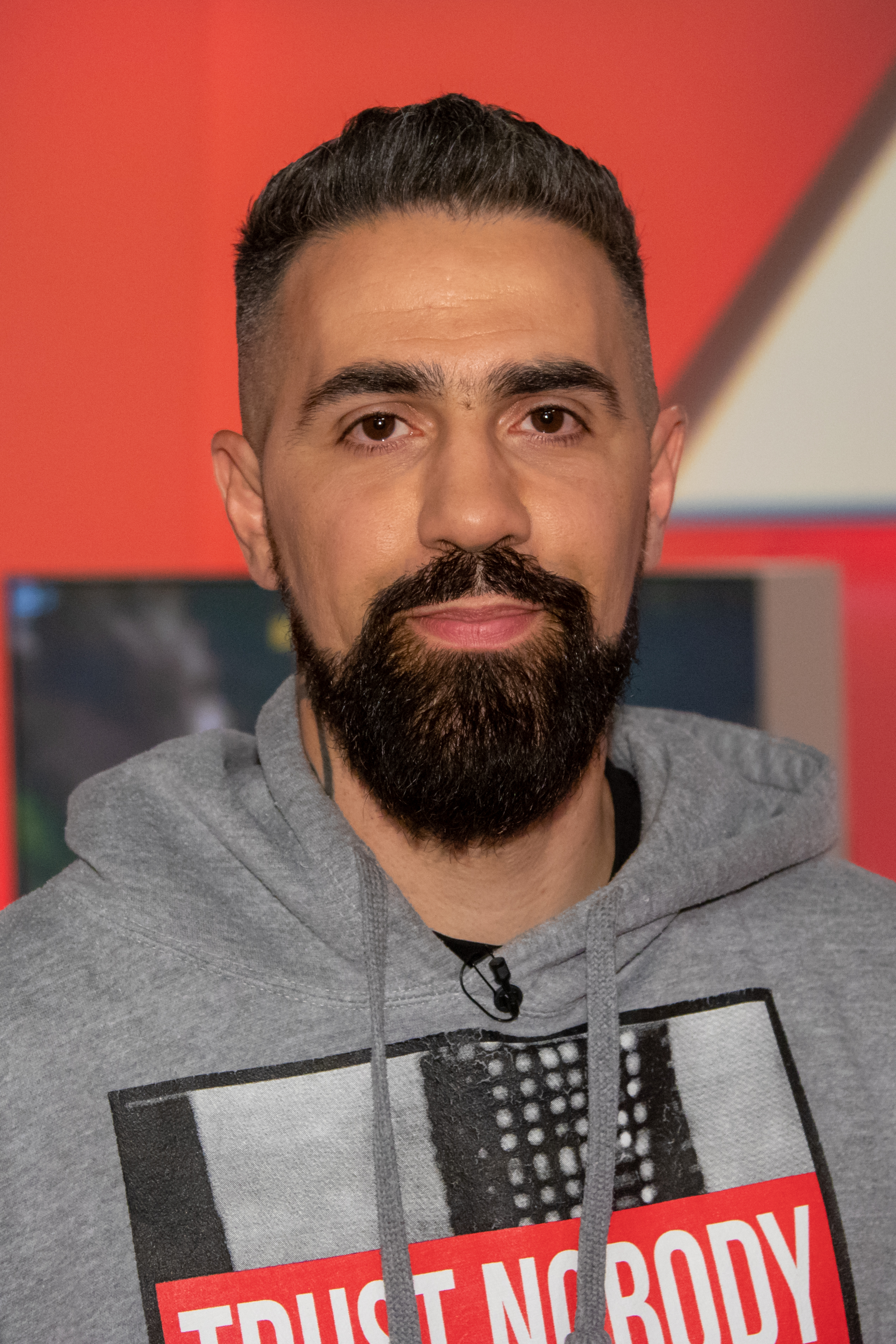
- Bushido in 2018

Background information
- Also known as: "Sonny Black"
- Born: Anis Mohamed Youssef Ferchichi; 28 September 1978 (age 48); Bonn, West Germany
- Origin: Berlin, West Germany
- Genres: Hip-hop; gangsta rap
- Occupations: Rapper, producer, entrepreneur
- Years active: 1998–present
- Label: ersguterjunge
- Spouse: Anna-Maria Lewe (m. 2012)
- Website: kingbushido.de

Anis Mohamed Youssef Ferchichi (born 28 September 1978), better known by his alias Bushido, is a German rapper, hip-hop producer, and entrepreneur. He is also the co-founder of the record label ersguterjunge.

Raised in Berlin, Ferchichi came in contact with hip-hop through graffiti and his friend and fellow rapper Fler. In 2001, Ferchichi released his demo King of KingZ, which later led him to sign a record label deal with Aggro Berlin. Ferchichi's first official release was Carlo Cokxxx Nutten in 2002, a collaboration with Fler.

== Early life ==
Ferchichi was born on 28 September 1978 to a Tunisian father and German mother in Bad Godesberg, Bonn, West Germany. His father left the family when Ferchichi was three years old while his mother decided to move to West Berlin. He grew up with his brother in Berlin-Tempelhof, where he had attended two gymnasiums before dropping out in eleventh grade.

According to his autobiography, Ferchichi was found guilty of drug possession and property damage and was given the choice to either face a jail term or to complete an officially recognized vocational training program. During his training, he met Patrick Losensky, also known as Fler, who introduced him to hip-hop and graffiti.

== Career ==
=== 1998–2004: Demo releases, King of KingZ and Aggro Berlin signing ===
Bushido's logo during his time with Aggro Berlin

Bushido and a then amateur rapper, Vader, formed a duo, Search & Defeat, in early 1998. They had worked on an album titled Unbreakable, but ultimately the album never finished. At some point, another Berlin rapper, King Orgasmus One, had joined the group, together forming the 030 Squad. They recorded a demo titled Westberlin Represent, selling some copies to friends. During his time with King Orgasmus One, Bushido had his first guest appearance on the track "Rap ist out", on Frauenarzt's 2000 demo album Tanga Tanga. Following the release of Tanga Tanga, Bushido, King Orgasmus One, and Bass Sultan Hengzt formed the group Berlins Most Wanted. This ultimately led to the creation of the record label I Luv Money Records in 2001. Bushido's first demo as a solo artist, King of KingZ, was released in 2001.

In 2002, Bushido and Fler joined Aggro Berlin, with Carlo Cokxxx Nutten (often abbreviated to CCN), a collaborative studio album by Bushido and Fler, was released in October 2002. On the record, the two rappers performed under their aliases Sonny Black and "Frank White", respectively. The album marked the first major release for both and is now regarded as highly influential for gangsta rap in Germany. Bushido followed this up with the release of his debut solo album Vom Bordstein bis zur Skyline in July 2003. The album again included several collaborations with Fler, and is considered a milestone of German hip-hop.

=== 2004–2005: Label forming, Electro Ghetto, CCN II and Staatsfeind Nr. 1 ===
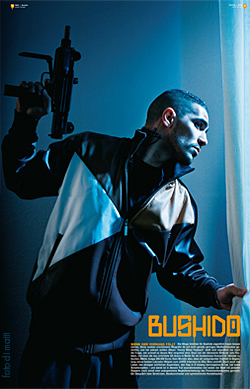
Bushido poster referencing By All Means Necessary

In summer 2004, Bushido left Aggro Berlin and signed with Urban/Universal. Together with DJ Ilan, he produced a remix of Rammstein's song "Amerika".

Bushido's second studio album, titled Electro Ghetto, was released in October 2004. The album reached number six on the German charts and spawned three singles, "Electro Ghetto", "Nie wieder", and "Hoffnung stirbt zuletzt", all of which placed in the singles charts for several weeks.

In April 2005, Bushido's second collaborative studio album, Carlo Cokxxx Nutten II, was released, once again under his alter ego "Sonny Black", but this time in partnership with Baba Saad instead of Fler. He followed this up with the release of his third studio album, titled Staatsfeind Nr. 1, in November 2005.

=== 2006–2007: Von der Skyline zum Bordstein zurück and 7 ===
On 1 September 2006, he released his fourth solo album, Von der Skyline zum Bordstein zurück (abbreviated as VDSZBZ). The second sampler, Vendetta – ersguterjunge Sampler Vol. 2, was released on 1 December 2006.

"Alles verloren" (2007)
30 second sample of "Alles verloren" by Bushido.

In early 2007, Bushido founded a girl band, Bisou, featuring former candidates of the casting show Popstars. He also bought and renovated a 660-square-metre (7,100 sq ft) mansion for himself and his mother in Berlin-Lichterfelde for €1,200,000.

=== 2008–2009: Autobiography, Heavy Metal Payback and reunion with Fler ===
In January 2008, it became known that Bushido and his unknown business partner had founded a real estate business, which yielded a million Euros in the first ten months.

Bushido released his autobiography Bushido on 8 September 2008, which had reached number 1 on the bestseller list Der Spiegel. His eighth album, Heavy Metal Payback, was released on 10 October 2008.

The music video for his single, "Für immer jung", caused controversy when MTV stopped airing it after two days of heavy rotation. The main editorial office had decided that the feature with Czech musician Karel Gott did not fit the image of MTV. In a meeting with Bushido, the chief editors offered to air the video on their other music channel, VIVA. Bushido, however, refused this and later forbade MTV and VIVA from airing his videos because he couldn't reconcile their decision with his conscience. Bushido wrote in his forum on the topic that:

Ich habe lange an diesem Freitag überlegt. […] für mich stellte sich einfach nur die Frage ob ich diesen Betrug hinnehmen oder die einzige logische Konsequenz treffen soll. […] und deswegen habe ich auf MTV geschissen. Egal was passiert, ich übernehme die volle Verantwortung, aber ich kann mir und vor allem Karel Gott in die Augen gucken.
(On this Friday I thought about this for a long time. […] for me it was simply a question of whether I should accept this betrayal or come to the only logical consequence[…] and that's why I left MTV. No matter what happens, I accept responsibility, but I can still look myself and above all, Karel Gott, in the eye.)

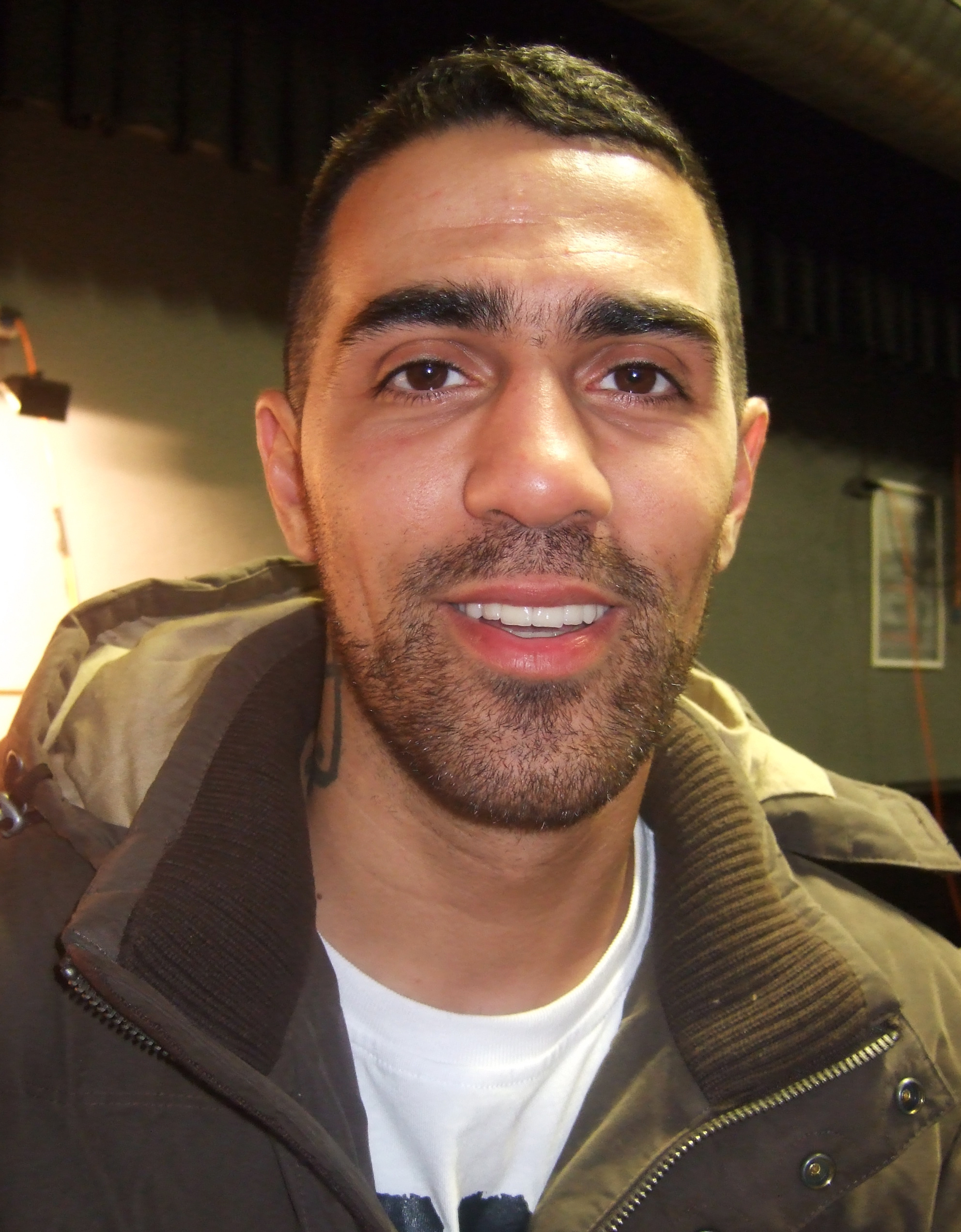
Bushido in 2009

Cooperation between Bushido and MTV ended afterwards.

After Fler left Aggro Berlin and the label shut down on 1 April 2009, Bushido reached out to his former partner to end their feud. The renewed friendship led to the production of a sequel to the 2002 album Carlo Cokxxx Nutten. The album is titled Carlo Cokxxx Nutten 2, as distinguished from the Carlo Cokxxx Nutten II sequel, recorded with Baba Saad in 2005. The album was released in September, with the single "Eine Chance/Zu Gangsta" and a music video promoting it.

=== 2010–2011: Film debut, BMW reunion, Jenseits von Gut und Böse and reunion with Sido ===
The movie Zeiten ändern dich was shot in and around Berlin from July to mid-September and released in February 2010. The movie is based on Bushido's autobiography, featuring Bushido as himself, directed by Uli Edel and produced by Bernd Eichinger. 80,000 people watched the movie on the release date.

The soundtrack to the movie, also titled Zeiten ändern dich, was released in three different versions on 19 February 2010.

At some point, Bushido and Kay One wrote and recorded "Fackeln im Wind", which was dedicated to the Germany national football team in honor of the 2010 FIFA World Cup and was released in June. Bushido got the idea for the song after meeting football player Sami Khedira during the "Zeiten ändern dich – Live durch Europa" tour.

In August, Bushido reformed the group, Berlins Most Wanted, which originally consisted of himself, Bass Sultan Hengzt, and King Orgasmus, in 2001 during the King of KingZ era, and added Kay One and Fler to the group. Together they released the album Berlins Most Wanted with a single also called "Berlins Most Wanted".

In late-March 2011, Bushido released a video on his YouTube channel, in which he confirmed plans for a new album titled Jenseits von Gut und Böse and the guest appearance of French rapper Booba. On 19 April, his second statement video was published, where he first thanked singer J-Luv for his vocal parts on the single "Vergiss mich", which was released on 22 April, in digital format along with the music video. He also presented the producers Rsonist and Benny Blanco and confirmed that Xavier Naidoo from Söhne Mannheims is featured as guest performer on the song "Du bist ein Mensch". His third statement video was published on 28 April on his YouTube channel. In this video, Bushido confirmed that his labelmate Kay One has a guest appearance on the album, and introduced DJ Desue as producer. Bushido also announced that the song "Wie ein Löwe" could be downloaded on iTunes the following day.

American record producers DJ Premier, Swizz Beatz, Araab Muzik and R'sonist each contributed one beat for the album. A meeting with Dr. Dre was also intended for the album, but Bushido cancelled the meeting due to the high price. Later, DJ Premier became disappointed that new vocals were added to the song "Gangster" and that his DJ cuts were edited without giving him a chance to hear the new version before it was released. However, it is currently unknown if the edits were Bushido's idea or that of his production team.

In 2011, after having ended their long-term feud, Bushido reunited with former Aggro Berlin labelmate Sido to form the short-lived rap duo, 23. Their self-titled collaborative studio album was released in October 2011. It spawned the singles "So mach ich es" and "Erwachsen sein".

=== 2012–2014: AMYF, "Stress ohne Grund" controversy and Sonny Black ===
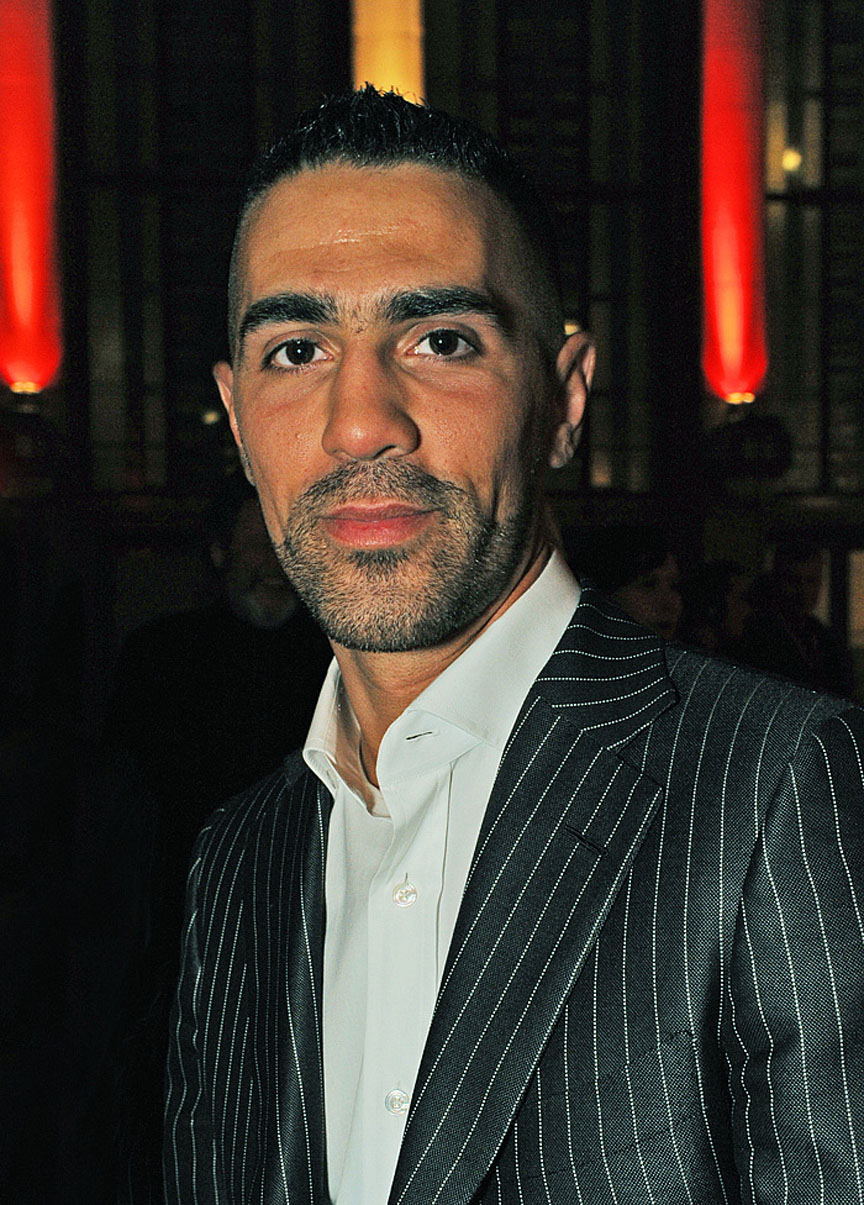
Bushido in 2012

On 14 June 2012, Bushido announced in an interview with the Bild newspaper that he would form a political party in order to become mayor of Berlin. The same month he completed an internship for CDU deputy Christian von Stetten in the Paul-Löbe-Haus in Berlin, which led to a lot of criticism due to Bushido's controversial song lyrics and his criminal past.

Bushido, at some point, had announced his eleventh album, AMYF, via Facebook, which was also available for pre-sale on Amazon. Later the tracklist and the iTunes version were published. The first announcement video was released on 22 August 2012, via YouTube on his channel. Bushido confirmed in the announcement that the deluxe version of the album features a DVD that shows footage of the recording period and also announced Sido, Eko Fresh, Julian Williams (aka J-Luv), MoTrip, and Joka as guest performers. On 19 September 2012, Bushido released the second announcement video, in which he announced several producers, including Beatzarre, Djorkaeff, X-Plosive Beats, and Phat Cripsy, and represented the other guest performers King Orgasmus One (who is only featured on the Premium edition) and Brutos Brutaloz. The third and last announcement released on 26 September 2012, where Bushido introduced Frauenarzt and Elmo as last guest features and announced the premiere of his music video for "Kleine Bushidos" (released via YouTube on 4 October), and the next day the song was available for any digital platform. On 12 October, released AMYF and ranked No. 1 on the album chart position in Germany and Switzerland.

The second single "Theorie & Praxis" (featuring Joka) was released on 9 November 2012, but failed to reach the charts. The third and final single release of the album, "Panamera Flow" (featuring Shindy), was released on 15 March 2013 and ranked no. 51 in Germany and Austria.

On 12 July 2013, Bushido was featured in one of Shindy's debut single "Stress ohne Grund", of his debut album NWA. After its release, the single caused controversy among the media and politicians. In the song, Bushido verbally attacked the politicians Serkan Tören, Claudia Roth and Klaus Wowereit. Tören and Wowereit filed charge against Bushido. The attorney of Berlin also filed charge against him for hate speech, defamation, and depiction of violence in his lyrics. The Federal Department for Media Harmful to Young Persons indexed NWA and confirmed it on in September 2013. Bushido explained in several television broadcaster and online portals, including ARD and N24, that he didn't want to hurt anyone. His lyrics in the song were just a response to the insults, that Claudia Roth and Serkan Tören had made previously towards him. In November 2013, the district court dismissed the indictment as with regard to artistic freedom.

On 25 October 2013, Bushido announced via his forum the release date of his twelfth studio album, titled Sonny Black. He also put a link for the Standard, iTunes, and the Deluxe edition. On 20 December 2013, he released the first music video for "Mitten in der Nacht" via Bushido's YouTube channel. The second music video for "Gangsta Rap Kings" (featuring Kollegah and Farid Bang) was released in January 2014. Before the release, Bushido posted two pictures on-set via Instagram. The first picture features Bushido and Farid Bang. The second picture features all three rappers with the hashtag "#KKS", referring to their then-up-coming album titles of each rapper: Killa (Farid Bang), King (Kollegah), and Sonny Black (Bushido). The third and last music video of the album, "Jeder meiner Freunde", released one day before the album's release. On 14 February 2014, released Sonny Black which ranked No. 1 in Germany, Austria, and Switzerland. According to the Media Control Gfk International, Sonny Black set a download record for being the most downloaded German rap album and ranking No. 1, beating Helene Fischer's album Farbenspiel.

=== 2015–present: CCN 3, CLA$$IC and Black Friday ===
In mid-January 2015, Bushido released a video via his YouTube channel where he announced the release date of Carlo, Cokxxx, Nutten 3. Before the album's release, many speculations and rumors circulated among Bushido's fan community about his collaboration partner for the album. German rappers Fler, Eko Fresh, Haftbefehl, and Shindy were rumored to be part of the project, but each artist denied it. Fler later stated in a YouTube interview with Nico Hüls, a journalist from hip-hop magazine Backspin, that he's not involved in the CCN project due to personal issues with Bushido.

In February 2015, Bushido released CCN 3 as solo album, without any singles or music video promoting it. German music producers - and longtime companions - Beatzarre and Djorkaeff produced the album, with some additional production by B-Case and Jeremia Anetor. CCN 3 ranked No. 1 in the German, Austrian, and Swiss Album charts and was certified gold. It received mixed reviews by German online music magazines.

In May 2015, Bushido served as a featured artist on rapper and labelmate Ali Bumaye's 2nd studio album, Rumble in the Jungle. The songs were "Kimbo Slice" (which also features Shindy) and "Best Friends".

As promotion for the collaborative album by Bushido and Shindy, titled CLA$$IC, three singles released prior the release date. The singles were "G$D" (released on October 14), "Brot brechen" (released on October 21), and "CLA$$IC" (released on November 4), accompanied by music videos via Bushido's official Youtube channel. The track "Rap leben" appeared on the disc of Juice, Issue 132. The fourth and final music video "Adel" released on the same date as the album - only the song's first part.

On November, released the album on Bushido's label ersguterjunge and Sony Music - with a standard and box-set edition - and ranked No. 1 in Germany, Austria, and Switzerland. Due to the production and musical style the album was often compared to Watch the Throne by Jay-Z and Kanye West.

Later in November, Bushido was featured on two songs of Shindy's third album, DREAMS. The songs were "Statements" (served as the album's 3rd single) and "Art of War".

In December 2016, Bushido announced his 12th studio album and the revealed the album's title in March 2017, Black Friday. The release date was set for May, but was later delayed to June 2017.

His next studio album, Mythos, was released in September 2018. It featured guest appearances from Akon, Capital Bra and Samra, and debuted at No. 1 in Germany.

== Controversy ==
=== Extreme right ===
Bushido is often criticized in the media for his misogynistic, nationalist, anti-semitic and racist lyrics and for refusing to reject some of his controversial fans.

Bushido' behavior has been compared with the macho personas found in rap/hip-hop culture in the United States, in addition to the glorification of gangsta rap in hip-hop culture, long considered an expressive outlet for people across ethnic lines, as the primary factor. However, some had pointed out his partial North African ethnicity and collaboration with minority artists like Azad, Eko Fresh and Cassandra Steen as proof that Bushido is not racist.

The controversy was magnified by the line "Salutiert, steht stramm, ich bin der Leader wie A" ("Salute, stand to attention, I am the leader like A") in Bushido's single "Electro Ghetto". The "A" is interpreted by many as referring to Adolf Hitler. According to Bushido, the line is a citation from a rap by Azad, who often calls himself "A". Bushido also called this a "willkommene Provokationsmöglichkeit" ("welcome opportunity to provoke").

=== Misogyny and homophobia ===
Bushido provoked much controversy through his use of controversial song lyrics, which can be interpreted as being misogynistic, homophobic, sexist, and violence-glorifying. For example, the song "Nutte Bounce", from his demo album King of KingZ (2001), frequently uses the term "Nutte" (German for "slut"). When questioned, Bushido explained that he doesn't mean women in general but rather the "real bitches". The song "Berlin" from his debut Vom Bordstein bis zur Skyline (2003) has the following line, which can be interpreted as homophobic:

Berlin wird wieder hart, denn wir verkloppen jede Schwuchtel.
(Berlin is going to be hard again, because we beat up every faggot)

In November 2005, Bushido hit the headlines after he made a scornful remark about Paris Hilton in an interview with net.zeitung.de: "She is just a stupid piece of meat... I just want to have sex with her; humiliate her and say goodbye."

In Vendetta – ersguterjunge Sampler Vol. 2 (2006), he made a reference to Natascha Kampusch in the song "Eine Nummer für sich", which has been criticized as "crude". Quoted as following:

Du bist ein krasser G auf eurem krassen Campus. Aber ich sperr' dich ein wie Natascha Kampusch.
(You're a G [gangster] on your cool campus. But I imprison you like Natascha Kampusch.)

In late August 2007, Bushido was criticized for his involvement in the concert Schau nicht weg, a campaign against violence at schools, organized by Bravo and VIVA. The critics had argued that Bushido could not be considered a role model because of his "homophobic and anti-women lyrics". According to Bravo, since 2006 he had been "very involved in the project, so his live performance could not be canceled". During the performance, Bushido appealed aggressively to a small group of homosexual protesters by saying: "You fuckers can demonstrate, hang yourself – I don't give a shit". This led to more criticism and controversy.

In June 2009, after participants of the Kreuzberg Pride festival spotted Bushido on the Berlin U-Bahn at Schlesisches Tor, a verbal conflict ensued between the rapper and the participants in which Bushido insulted the individuals by referring to their sexual orientation. As a result, he and his entourage were splashed with drinks and the organizers of the pride festival sued him for libel.

=== Anti-Israel Twitter controversy ===
In January 2013, Bushido garnered additional media attention by tweeting "Free Palestine" along with a map of the Middle East in which Israel did not exist. German Interior Minister Hans-Peter Friedrich told the Bild am Sonntag that "this illustration does not serve peace, rather it sows hate."

Israel's embassy in Berlin responded to the rapper's actions by tweeting, with irony, directly to his Twitter handle: "@Bushido78 first women, then gays and now Israel: We are proud to belong to the victims of the integration prize winner Bushido."

In 2011, Bushido received a Bambi Award for successful German integration in Germany, despite his reputation for homophobia and misogyny. The Bambi Foundation head Patricia Riekel reacted to his tweet by saying: "We are examining the incident and will react accordingly."

=== Lawsuits for assault ===
More legal troubles ensued following an incident at a party in Linz, Austria on 30 July 2005. Upon discovery that his tires had been slashed, Bushido and two of his bodyguards were involved in a physical altercation with a 19-year-old Austrian man from Linz who was left with severe head injuries. Bushido blames the victim for damaging the tires of his BMW 7 Series. Bushido spent 15 days (3–18 August) in jail before being released on €100,000 bail. He ended up paying €20,000 to the Austrian courts and another €1,000 to the victim himself. It was during this time that it became publicly known that Bushido had been married to another woman for several years when the judge questioned him on the topic. Bushido later denied these claims.

=== Copyright infringement ===
Bushido garnered some press coverage when his record company, Universal Music Group, sued EMI over an alleged copyright violation that derived from similarities between the cover of Deutschland gib mir ein Mic and Music Is My Savior, an album by American rapper Mims.

In 2007, Bushido earned more international press coverage when he was threatened with legal action by the symphonic black metal band Dimmu Borgir, who claimed that Bushido had sampled two of their songs without permission, "Mourning Palace" and "Alt Lys Er Svunnet Hen". Bushido's songs named were "Mittelfingah" and "Engel".

Dimmu Borgir's manager was quoted saying:

Since we were not contacted by Bushido through proper channels and told about his desire to do this, it is clear that Bushido has seriously infringed our intellectual property rights.

No case was brought against him. Two songs from the Liverpool band Antimatter had also been sampled by Bushido without permission, although this dispute was settled later before any legal action was taken. The songs were "Terminal" and "Epitaph" (sampled on "Von der Skyline zum Bordstein zurück" and "Sonnenbank Flavour").

26 September 2008, Bushido was charged with international copyright infringement by the American gothic band Nox Arcana for copying music from three of their songs: "Beyond Midnight" (copied by Bushido on "Weißt Du?"), "No Rest for the Wicked" (copied by Bushido on "Kurt Cobain") and "Cthulhu Rising" (copied by Bushido on "Blaues Licht"). Nox Arcana's songs was featured on their albums Darklore Manor (2003) and Necronomicon (2004). Bushido's album Von der Skyline zum Bordstein zurück (2006), which copied Nox Arcana's songs, was re-released in 2007 after going Platinum in Germany.

Here is a section taken from the official page of Nox Arcana:

The German rapper, Anis Mohamed Ferchichi, who calls himself "Bushido" or "Sonny Black" is looking at international copyright infringement charges. (...) This time, however, Bushido has stolen music from the American Gothic group Nox Arcana, who is taking legal action against the rapper and his label.

Also, the French band Dark Sanctuary had accused Bushido of taking songs off their material without permission. For his single "Janine" he used the melody of the song "Les Mémoires Blessées". On 23 March 2010, German courts convicted him and ordered him to make reparations and to stop the sales of the affected albums, singles, and samplers, including Von der Skyline zum Bordstein zurück. In addition to that, he was ordered to recall and destroy all unsold copies.

A video was leaked online by Marzel Becker and Stephan Heller, two German music reviewers. In their video, they compared Dark Sanctuary's songs to those of Bushido.

=== Links to organized crime ===
In April 2013, it became publicly known that Bushido signed on 22 December 2010 a general power of attorney to Arafat Abou-Chaker, the leader of the Lebanese criminal clan Abou-Chaker, which allows him to dispose of Bushido's entire estate, including accounts, cars, and financial profits. Bushido paid Arafat money in exchange for having his career managed by him, and having rival rappers in Berlin exiled by the clan. German magazine stern has reported on numerous occasions about Bushido's relationship with the mafia clan. In 2018, Bushido's wife, Anna-Maria Ferchichi, claimed that Bushido left the clan. Bushido also admitted that he was an accomplice to Abou-Chaker's crimes, and that he "looked the other way".

== Feuds ==
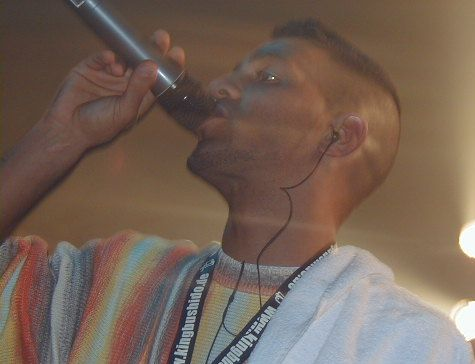
Bushido performing in 2006

=== Kay One ===
In late March 2012, Kay One's videos, along with their million views, had been removed from Bushido's YouTube channel. Bushido tweeted following this action: "I don't have beef, with anyone". Following that, Kay One posted a statement on Facebook, saying that "the truth will come out soon". The statement ends with the word "ex-guterjunge".

In April 2012, Kay One said goodbye to ersguterjunge via Facebook. Five days prior, Bushido announced the trademark of the phrase "Kay One" on the German Patent and Trade Mark Office.

In May 2012, Kay One was attacked after two performances by masked persons armed with knives, although there were no casualties. Later, he blamed Bushido for sending the attackers. Bushido, in turn, denied it.

In May 2013, Bushido's former friend Shindy released a diss track against Kay One, titled "Alkoholisierte Pädophile", accusing him of pedophilia and complaining about not being paid for co-writing songs for the album Prince of Belvedair. Kay One banned the track and reacted via Facebook to it, where he stated that he would "uncover the truth" about Bushido and Shindy.

In June 2013, Bushido and Shindy were both guests at the German online hip-hop portal 16 Bars TV. In the interview with hostess Visa Vie, they talked about their personal issues with Kay One. In late-July, Bushido refers to his beef with Kay One in the song "Stress ohne Grund" with the line: "Kay du Bastard bist jetzt vogelfrei" ("Kay you bastard, you are now outlawed").

In August 2013, Kay One's diss track "Nichts als die Wahrheit" was released, rapping about his past with Bushido and Shindy. In response to the accusation of being a pedophile, he claimed that Bushido had cheated on his wife with a 17-year-old girl. The dispute between both artists reached its high point when Kay One was invited onto the German TV show stern TV, in October 2013, where he talked about the "mafia business" of the Palestinian clan Abou-Chaker and claimed that Bushido served as the "slave of the family". Since then, Kay One receives anonymous death threats and got police protection.

Bushido then announced his ten-minute-long diss track, "Leben und Tod des Kenneth Glöckler", on many social media outlets. The track was released on 22 November 2013, via Bushido's YouTube channel and reached 2 million views within 24 hours. By December 2018, the video reached almost 50 million views. The track received positive feedback from the German hip-hop community. Hours later, Kay One reacted via Facebook by calling Bushido a "hate preacher" and accused him of lying. He also stated that he will not talk anymore about the feud.

However, a year later in November 2014, Kay One released his 25-minute response track, "Tag des Jüngsten Gerichts", on his YouTube channel. The music video set a YouTube record in the German rap community, reaching 3 million views in the first 24 hours. Anne-Marie Ferchichi, Bushido's wife, took offense at Kay One's lyrics directed at her and sent him a warning via a lawyer. Kay One originally removed the video but re-uploaded it half a day later. The video was again removed from YouTube due to a court order by Bushido's lawyer. Since then, the video has been completely removed from the platform, but has been re-uploaded by third-party channels.

=== Kollegah and Farid Bang ===
In 2014, Bushido, Farid Bang, and Kollegah collaborated on "Gangsta Rap Kings", a single for Bushido's tenth studio album Sonny Black. The relationship between Farid Bang and Kollegah and Bushido worsened after that. After several indirect provocations from both sides, the situation escalated at an open-air festival in Munich in the summer of 2017. On their third collaboration album Jung Brutal Gutaussehend 3 Kollegah and Bang dissed Bushido and several ersguterjunge artists directly.

== Personal life ==
Bushido has been in a relationship with former German model Anna-Maria Lewe (born 1981) since early 2011, and they married in May 2012. Lewe (now Ferchichi) is the younger sister of German singer Sarah Connor and ex-wife of Finnish footballer Pekka Lagerblom. Lewe has a son from a previous marriage. The couple share seven children, including twins and triplets.

Since August 2022, Bushido has lived in Dubai with his family, after they left their home in Berlin.

== Discography ==
=== Studio albums ===
- Vom Bordstein bis zur Skyline (2003)
- Electro Ghetto (2004)
- Staatsfeind Nr. 1 (2005)
- Von der Skyline zum Bordstein zurück (2006)
- 7 (2007)
- Heavy Metal Payback (2008)
- Zeiten ändern dich (2010)
- Jenseits von Gut und Böse (2011)
- AMYF (2012)
- Sonny Black (2014)
- Carlo Cokxxx Nutten 3 (2015)
- Black Friday (2017)
- Mythos (2018)
- Sonny Black II (2021)
- König für immer (2024)

=== Collaborations ===
- Carlo Cokxxx Nutten - with Fler (Note: Bushido and Fler alias "Sonny Black" and "Frank White" respectively.)(2002)
- Carlo Cokxxx Nutten II - with Baba Saad (Note: Bushido alias "Sonny Black".) (2005)
- Carlo Cokxxx Nutten 2 - with Fler (2009)
- Berlins Most Wanted - with Berlins Most Wanted (Note: A rap group consisting of Bushido, Kay One and Fler.) (2010)
- 23 - with Sido (Note: Bushido and Sido alias "23") (2011)
- CLA$$IC - with Shindy (2015)
- Carlo Cokxxx Nutten 4 - with Animus (2019)

== Tours ==
- Auf die harte Tour – with Azad (2004)
- ersguterjunge Tour (2005)
- Gib mir ein Mic Tour (2005)
- ersguterjunge Tour (2006)
- Von der Skyline zur Bühne zurück Tour (2007)
- "7" Tour (2007)
- Carlo Cokxxx Nutten 2 Tour – with Fler (2009)
- Zeiten ändern dich – Live durch Europa (2010)
- v2.010 Tour (2011)
- Jenseits von Gut und Böse Tour (2012)

== Film appearances ==
| Year | Film | Role | Notes |
|---|---|---|---|
| 2009 | Horst Schlämmer – Isch kandidiere! | Guest part | Comedy |
| 2010 | Zeiten ändern dich | Himself | Autobiographical film |

== Awards ==
- 2005

Juice-Awards
1. Place in the categories Beste Website für kingbushido.de, Bestes Album National for Staatsfeind Nr. 1
Bravo Otto in Silber in the category HipHop National

- 2006:

Echo-Winner in the category Live-Act National
"Goldenes Tape" for 20 number 1 positions of the video Von der Skyline zum Bordstein zurück in the MTV-Show TRL
MTV Europe Music Award in the category Best German Act
Juice-Awards: 1. place in the categories Live Performance National, Video National für Sonnenbank Flavour, Single National for Von der Skyline zum Bordstein zurück, Rap Solokünstler National
Echo-winner in the category Hip-Hop/R&B National
"Bravo Otto" in Gold in the category HipHop National
"Comet" winner in the category Bester Künstler
"Goldener Pinguin" of the Austrian Youth-magazine "Xpress" in the category: Bester Rapper Des Jahres

- 2007:

MTV Europe Music Award in the category Best German Act
"Goldener Pinguin" of the Austrian Youth-magazine "Xpress" in the category: Bester Rapper Des Jahres

- 2008:

Echo-winner in the category Hip-Hop/R&B National
Echo-winner in the category Live-Act National
"Comet" in the category Beste/r Künstler/in
"Bravo Otto" in Gold in the category Bester Hip-Hop Act national
"Goldener Pinguin" of the Austrian Youth-magazine "Xpress" in the category: Bester Rapper Des Jahres
Juice-Awards: 1. place in the categories Solokünstler National, Produzent National, Single National (Für immer jung, ft. Karel Gott), Album National (Heavy Metal Payback), Video National (Für immer jung, ft. Karel Gott), Live Performance National, Bestes Cover

- 2009:

"Bravo Otto" in Gold in the category Supersänger international
"Goldener Pinguin" of the Austrian Youth-magazine "Xpress" in the category: Bester Rapper Des Jahres

- 2010:

"Bravo Otto" in Gold in the category Bester Rapper national
"GQ-Mann des Jahres" in the category Musik national

- 2011:

"Bambi" in the category Integration

- 2012:

Echo-winner in the category Bestes Video National for So mach ich es with Sido

== Sources ==
- "Germany's Rap Music Veers Toward the Violent". The New York Times. 8 August 2005.
- Dimmu Borgir Accuses German Rapper of 'Stealing' Band's Music, Blabbermouth.net, 1 November 2007
- Bushido klaut von Nox Arcana, Zeitzeuge, 6 October 2010
