= Ersguterjunge =

Independent German hip hop label

ersguterjunge
- Founded: 2004
- Founder: Bushido and D-Bo
- Distributor: Sony BMG
- Genre: Hip hop
- Country of origin: Germany
- Location: Berlin

ersguterjunge is an independent German hip hop label distributed by Sony BMG. It was founded by rappers D-Bo and Bushido in 2004, after he left the indie label Aggro Berlin. Bushido is the managing director. ersguterjunge reflects slang used amongst some Germany's immigrant population — in standard German meaning "er ist ein guter Junge" ("he is a good boy").

== History ==
Bass Sultan Hengzt was signed in 2005, but left shortly after the release of his album Rap braucht immer noch kein Abitur. DJ Ilan and DJ Devin also left, due to personal issues, and were replaced by producers Chakuza and DJ Stickle, alias Beatlefield.

Two more artists were signed little later: Screwaholic now part of Anno Domini Nation, a producer, and Bizzy Montana, a rapper and producer.

Female rapper Bahar left the label, because in her opinion it did not provide the possibility of a successful album release.

Nyze, who had been on several ersguterjunge releases, was signed in December 2006 and his album Geben & Nehmen was released in January 2007. Eko Fresh also signed in the same month, and Saad renewed his contract to release another album.

In early 2007 Bushido started the girl group Bisou, which consists of former candidates of the German version of Popstars. With Kay One and Tarééc, two more artists were signed.

In May 2010, released Kay One's debut album Kenneth allein zu Haus. The album reached Top 10 in the charts.

== Artists ==
=== Current acts ===
| Act | Year signed | Albums under ersguterjunge | Description |
|---|---|---|---|
| Bushido | 2004 | 18 | Rapper from Bonn. He founded the label in 2004 after leaving Aggro Berlin. He is also the managing director. |

=== Former acts ===
| Act | Years on the label | Albums under ersguterjunge | Description |
|---|---|---|---|
| Bass Sultan Hengzt | 2005 | 1 | Rapper from Berlin. He released his album Rap braucht immer noch kein Abitur on the label. Shortly after he left the label and that led to a conflict with Bushido. |
| Bahar | 2005–2006 | - | Rapper of Iranian descent and the first female artist who signed. She has been featured on the albums of her label mates. She left the label because of "missing perspective". |
| Billy (formerly Billy13) | 2004/2005-2006 | - | Singer and rapper. |
| Bisou | 2007–2008 | 1 | Girl group composed of Eliana D'Ippolito, Elvira Michieva and Kristina Neuwert, formed by Bushido. In 2008, the group split up. |
| Eko Fresh | 2006–2008 | 1 | Rapper from Mönchengladbach. He has an own label called German Dream Entertainment. |
| D-Bo | 2004-2009 | 3 | Rapper from Göttingen and co-founder. He co-produced numerous Bushido albums and was as well featured. After leaving the label, he formed the label Wolfpack Entertainment. |
| Tarééc | 2007–2010 | 1 | Singer from Neukölln. He released his debut album Hoffnung on the label, like his two singles "Für das Volk" and "Tränen lügen nicht". |
| Chakuza | 2005–2010 | 4 | Rapper from Linz, Austria and one half of producer team Beatlefield. |
| Baba Saad | 2005-2011 | 2 | Rapper from Beirut, Lebanon. He collaborated with Bushido on Carlo Cokxxx Nutten II and released two solo albums. Currently is he founder and a signed artist of label Halunkenband. |
| Bizzy Montana | 2006–2011 | | Rapper from Müllheim. |
| Nyze | 2006–2011 | | Rapper from Saarbrücken. |
| Kay One | 2007–2012 | 3 | Rapper from Friedrichshafen. He collaborated with Bushido on several releases. In 2012, he left the label after Bushido had removed his videos on YouTube. |
| Samra | 2017–2019 | | |
| Capital Bra | 2018–2019 | | |

=== Current producers ===
- Bushido

== Releases ==
=== Singles ===
| Year | Title | Artist | Chart position | | | Album |
| Year | Title | Artist | Germany | Austria | Switzerland | Album |
|---|---|---|---|---|---|---|
| 2004 | "Electro Ghetto" | Bushido | 31 | - | - | Electro Ghetto |
| 2004 | "Nie wieder" | Bushido | 53 | - | - | Electro Ghetto |
| 2005 | "Hoffnung stirbt zuletzt" | Bushido feat. Cassandra Steen | 29 | - | - | Electro Ghetto |
| 2005 | "Nie ein Rapper" | Sonny Black (Bushido) & Baba Saad | 24 | - | - | Carlo, Cokxxx, Nutten 2 |
| 2005 | "Endgegner" | Bushido | 13 | 48 | - | Staatsfeind Nr. 1 |
| 2006 | "Augenblick" | Bushido | 17 | 42 | - | Staatsfeind Nr. 1 |
| 2006 | "Womit hab ich das verdient" | Baba Saad | 68 | - | - | Das Leben ist Saad |
| 2006 | "Von der Skyline zum Bordstein zurück" | Bushido | 14 | 34 | - | Von der Skyline zum Bordstein zurück |
| 2006 | "Sonnenbank Flavour" | Bushido | 15 | 25 | - | Von der Skyline zum Bordstein zurück |
| 2006 | "Vendetta" | Chakuza, Eko Fresh & Bushido | 32 | 53 | - | Vendetta – ersguterjunge Sampler Vol. 2 |
| 2007 | "Janine" | Bushido | 23 | 35 | - | Von der Sykline zum Bordstein zurück |
| 2007 | "Eure Kinder" | Chakuza feat. Bushido | 25 | 51 | - | City Cobra |
| 2007 | "Die erste Träne" | Bisou | 23 | 49 | - | Hier und Jetzt |
| 2007 | "Sollten alle untergehen" | Chakuza | 72 | - | - | City Cobra |
| 2007 | "Alles Verloren" | Bushido | 4 | 3 | 22 | 7 |
| 2007 | "Ring frei" | Eko Fresh feat. Bushido | 64 | - | - | |
| 2007 | "Alles Gute kommt von unten" | Bushido feat. Chakuza & Kay One | 32 | 68 | - | Alles Gute kommt von unten – ersguterjunge Sampler Vol. 3 |
| 2008 | "Regen" | Saad feat. Bushido | 67 | - | - | Saadcore |
| 2008 | "Unter der Sonne" | Chakuza feat. Bushido | 38 | 54 | – | Unter der Sonne |
| 2008 | "Ching Ching" | Bushido | 9 | 16 | 57 | Heavy Metal Payback |
| 2008 | "Für das Volk" | Tarééc feat. Chakuza | - | - | - | Hoffnung |
| 2008 | "Für immer jung" | Bushido feat. Karel Gott | 5 | 25 | 70 | Heavy Metal Payback |
| 2009 | "Ein Letzes Mal" | Nyze feat. Bushido | - | - | - | Amnezia |
| 2009 | "Eine Chance/Zu Gangsta" | Sonny Black (Bushido) & Frank White (Fler) | 26 | 26 | - | Carlo, Cokxxx, Nutten 2 |
| 2010 | "Alles wird gut" | Bushido | 10 | 12 | 20 | Zeiten ändern dich |
| 2010 | "Monster in mir" | Chakuza | - | - | - | Monster in Mir |
| 2010 | "Style & das Geld" | Kay One feat. Sonny Black (Bushido) | - | - | - | Kenneth allein zu Haus |
| 2010 | "Ich brech die Herzen" | Kay One | 67 | - | - | Kenneth allein zu Haus |
| 2010 | "Das alles ist Deutschland" | Fler feat. Bushido & Sebastian Krumbiegel | 28 | - | - | Flersguterjunge |
| 2010 | "Zeiten ändern dich" | Bushido | - | - | 63 | Zeiten ändern dich |
| 2010 | "Fackeln im Wind" | Bushido & Kay One | 6 | 52 | - | Non-track album |
| 2010 | "Berlins Most Wanted" | Berlins Most Wanted | 31 | 57 | - | Berlins Most Wanted |
| 2011 | "Vergiss mich" | Bushido feat. J-Luv | 19 | 26 | 34 | Jenseits von Gut und Böse |
| 2011 | "Wie ein Löwe" | Bushido | - | 31 | - | Jenseits von Gut und Böse |
| 2011 | "Das ist Business" | Bushido feat. Kay One | - | 60 | - | Jenseits von Gut und Böse |
| 2011 | "Wärst du immer noch hier?" | Bushido | 44 | 48 | 68 | Jenseits von Gut und Böse |
| 2011 | "So mach ich es" | 23 | 23 | 32 | 37 | 23 |
| 2011 | "Erwachsen Sein" | 23 feat. Peter Maffay | 29 | 29 | - | 23 |
| 2012 | "I Need a Girl Part 3" | Kay One feat. Mario Winans | 29 | 44 | 39 | Prince of Belvedair |

== See also ==
- List of record labels
- List of hip hop record labels
