= Fler discography =

Rapper discography

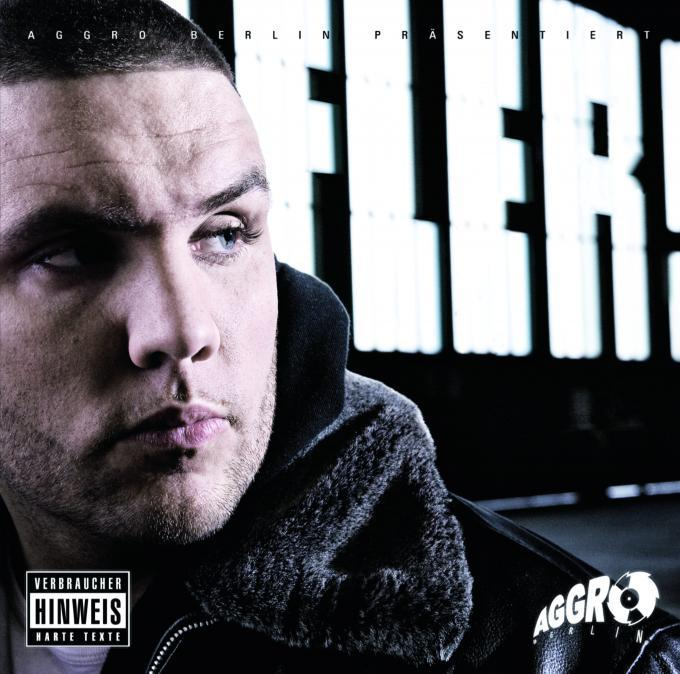
- Studio albums: 17
- Extended plays: 1
- Compilation albums: 9
- Singles: 60
- Music videos: 37
- Collaborative albums: 4

German rapper Fler has released 17 studio albums, four mixtapes, one EP, six collaborative albums and 59 singles.

== Albums ==
=== Studio albums ===
List of studio albums, with chart positions
Title	Album details	Peak chart positions		
Title	Album details	GER	AUT	SWI
Neue Deutsche Welle	Released: 2 May 2005; Label: Aggro Berlin; Formats: CD, digital download	5	28	68
Trendsetter	Released: 23 June 2006; Label: Aggro Berlin; Formats: CD, digital download	4	21	44
Fremd im eigenen Land	Released: 25 January 2008; Label: Aggro Berlin; Formats: CD, digital download	7	17	25
Fler	Released: 27 March 2009; Label: Aggro Berlin; Formats: CD, digital download	10	14	36
Flersguterjunge	Released: 11 June 2010; Label: ersguterjunge; Formats: CD, digital download	4	8	12
Airmax Muzik II	Released: 8 April 2011; Label: Maskulin; Formats: CD, digital download	6	7	9
Im Bus ganz hinten	Released: 16 September 2011; Label: Maskulin; Formats: CD, digital download	3	9	7
Hinter blauen Augen	Released: 2 November 2012; Label: Maskulin; Formats: CD, digital download	3	10	11
Blaues Blut	Released: 19 April 2013; Label: Maskulin; Formats: CD, digital download	3	5	7
Neue Deutsche Welle 2	Released: 5 September 2014; Label: Maskulin; Formats: CD, digital download	2	6	3
Keiner kommt klar mit mir	Released: 6 February 2015; Label: Maskulin; Formats: CD, digital download	1	4	3
Weil die Straße nicht vergisst	Released: 11 September 2015; Label: Maskulin; Formats: CD, digital download	2	5	5
Vibe	Released: 2 September 2016; Label: Maskulin; Formats: CD, digital download	1	1	1
Flizzy	Released: 23 March 2018; Label: Maskulin; Formats: CD, digital download	4	2	3
Colucci	Released: 29 March 2019; Label: Maskulin; Formats: CD, digital download	1	2	3
Atlantis	Released: 20 March 2020; Label: Maskulin; Formats: CD, digital download	1	3	5
WIDDER	Released: 26 March 2021; Label: Maskulin; Formats: CD, digital download	1	2	3

==== Collaborative albums ====
List of collaborative studio albums, with chart positions
Title	Album details	Peak chart positions		
Title	Album details	GER	AUT	SWI
Carlo Cokxxx Nutten (with Bushido)	Released: 21 October 2002; Label: Aggro Berlin; Formats: CD, digital download	—	—	—
Südberlin Maskulin (with Godsilla)	Released: 29 August 2008; Label: Aggro Berlin; Formats: CD, digital download	22	—	81
Carlo Cokxxx Nutten 2 (with Bushido)	Released: 11 September 2009; Label: ersguterjunge; Formats: CD, digital download	3	5	9
Berlins Most Wanted	Released: 22 October 2010; Label: ersguterjunge; Formats: CD, digital download	2	3	3
Südberlin Maskulin II (with Silla)	Released: 9 March 2012; Label: Maskulin; Formats: CD, digital download	6	11	7
Epic (with Jalil)	Released: 30 June 2017; Label: Maskulin; Formats: CD, digital download	1	3	1

=== Compilations ===
Year	Album details	Peak chart positions			Certifications
Year	Album details	GER	AUT	SWI	Certifications
2003	Aggro Ansage Nr. 3: Various Artists; Released: Label: Aggro Berlin; Formats: CD, digital download	—	—	—	
2004	Aggro Ansage Nr. 4: Various Artists; Released: Label: Aggro Berlin; Formats: CD, digital download	7	—	—	BVMI: Gold
2005	Aggro Ansage Nr. 5: Various Artists; Released: Label: Aggro Berlin; Formats: CD, digital download	9	27	—	BVMI: Gold
2008	Aggro Anti Ansage Nr. 8: Various Artists; Released: Label: Aggro Berlin; Formats: CD, digital download	25	20	10	
2011	Maskulin Mixtape Vol. 1: Various Artists; Released: 28 October 2011; Label: Maskulin; Formats: CD, digital download	—	—	—	
2012	Maskulin Mixtape Vol. 2: Various Artists; Released: 1 June 2012; Label: Maskulin; Formats: CD, digital download	—	—	—	
2013	Maskulin Mixtape Vol. 3: Various Artists; Released: 13 September 2013; Label: Maskulin; Formats: CD, digital download	8	8	9	
2014	Maskulin Mixtape Vol. 4 - Straßenträumer: Various Artists; Released: 6 December 2013 (digital); Label: Maskulin; Formats: CD, digital download	17	62	38	
2015	Der Staat gegen Patrick Decker: Best of album; Released: 4 December 2015; Label: Maskulin; Formats: CD, digital download	13	26	14	

=== Mixtapes ===
List of mixtapes, with selected chart positions and year released
Title	Album details	Peak chart positions		
Title	Album details	GER	AUT	SWI
New Kidz on the Block (with DJ Devin & Bushido)	Released: 17 November 2003; Label: Aggro Berlin; Format: Digital download	—	—	—
F.L.E.R. 90210	Released: 13 January 2006; Label: Aggro Berlin; Format: CD, digital download	19	—	—
Airmax Muzik	Released: 2 February 2007; Label: Aggro Berlin; Format: CD, digital download	13	37	—
Fler Max Muzik	Released: 2007; Label: Aggro Berlin; Format: free download (www.papafler.de)	—	—	—
Wir nehmen auch Euro	Released: 7 December 2007; Label: Aggro Berlin; Format: CD, digital download	—	—	—

=== EPs ===
List of mixtapes, with selected chart positions and year released
Title	Album details	Peak chart positions		
Title	Album details	GER	AUT	SWI
Bewährung vorbei EP	Released: 27 May 2016; Label: Maskulin; Format: digital download	11	4	6

== Singles ==
=== As lead artist ===
Year	Title	Chart positions			Album
Year	Title	GER	AUT	SWI	Album
2004	"Aggroberlina"	59	—	—	non-album track
2005	"NDW 2005"	9	19	—	Neue Deutsche Welle
2005	"Nach eigenen Regeln" (featuring G-Hot)	22	49	—	Neue Deutsche Welle
2006	"Papa ist zurück"	23	32	—	Trendsetter
2006	"Cüs Junge" (featuring Muhabbet)	50	75	—	Trendsetter
2008	"Deutscha Bad Boy"	16	68	—	Fremd im eignen Land
2008	"Warum bist du so?"	61	—	—	Fremd im eignen Land
2009	"Check mich aus"	74	—	—	Fler
2009	"Ich sing nicht mehr für dich" (featuring Doreen Steinert)	33	—	—	Fler
2010	"Das alles ist Deutschland" (featuring Bushido & Sebastian Krumbiegel)	28	—	—	Flersguterjunge
2010	"Schwer Erziehbar 2010"	—	—	—	Flersguterjunge
2011	"Nie an mich geglaubt"	64	—	—	Airmax Muzik II
2011	"Minutentakt"	60	—	—	Airmax Muzik II
2011	"Polosport Massenmord" (digital only) (featuring MoTrip & Silla)	—	—	—	Airmax Muzik II
2011	"Spiegelbild"	38	73	—	Im Bus ganz hinten
2011	"Zeichen" (digital only) (featuring Moe Mitchell)	—	—	—	Im Bus ganz hinten
2012	"Bleib wach" (with Silla)	79	—	—	Südberlin Maskulin II
2012	"Nummer 1"	92	—	—	Hinter blauen Augen
2012	"Hinter blauen Augen" (digital only)	—	—	—	Hinter blauen Augen
2012	"Nimm mich wie ich bin"	—	—	—	Hinter blauen Augen
2013	"Barack Osama"	68	—	—	Blaues Blut
2013	"Pheromone"	—	—	—	Blaues Blut
2014	"Stabiler Deutscher" (digital only)	82	—	—	Neue Deutsche Welle 2
2014	"Hipster Hass"	—	—	—	Neue Deutsche Welle 2
2014	"Schutzengel"	—	—	—	Neue Deutsche Welle 2
2015	"Straßenstaub"	—	—	—	Weil die Straße nicht vergisst
2016	"Unterwegs" (feat. Sentino)	—	—	—	Vibe
2016	"Lifestyle der Armen und Gefährlichen"	—	—	—	Vibe
2016	"Junge aus der City"	—	—	—	Vibe
2016	"Du hast den schönsten Arsch der Welt"	93	—	—	Vibe
2016	"Sollte so sein" (with Jalil feat. Mortel)	—	—	—	Epic
2017	"Predigt" (with Jalil)	76	72	93	Epic
2017	"Makellos" (with Jalil)	—	—	—	Epic
2017	"Slowmotion" (with Jalil)	—	—	—	Epic
2017	"Paradies" (with Jalil)	—	—	—	Epic
2017	"Hype" (with Jalil)	—	—	—	Epic
2017	"Tag eins" (with Remoe)	90	—	—	Flizzy
2017	"Highlevel Ignoranz"	—	—	—	Flizzy
2018	"AMG" (feat. Farid Bang)	19	32	42	Flizzy
2018	"Big Dreams" (feat. Rick Ross)	67	—	—	Flizzy
2018	"Late Check-Out"	—	—	—	Flizzy
2018	"Pfirsich"	95	—	—	Flizzy
2018	"Flizzy"	65	—	95	Flizzy
2018	"Dieser Boy"	—	—	—	non-album track
2018	"Keinen wie mich"	38	63	73	Colucci
2018	"Gänsehaut" (featuring Mosenu)	70	—	—	non-album track
2019	"Sex Money Murder" (featuring Mosenu)	75	—	—	Colucci
2019	"Kugelsicherer Jugendlicher" (with Play69 and Farid Bang)	80	—	—	Kugelsicherer Jugendlicher
2019	"Respektlose Jungs" (featuring Farid Bang)	65	—	—	Colucci
2019	"Shirinbae"	45	—	—	Non-album tracks
2019	"Keiner kann was machen"	86	—	—	Non-album tracks
2019	"Fame"	66	—	—	Non-album tracks
2019	"Noname"	80	—	—	Non-album tracks
2020	"Grind"	39	—	88	Atlantis
2020	"Lost" (with Sido)	36	—	—	Atlantis
2020	"Casablanca" (with Dú Maroc and Haftbefehl)	82	—	—	Non-album track

=== Collaboration singles ===
Year	Title	Chart positions			Album
Year	Title	GER	AUT	SWI	Album
2008	"Ich bin ein Rapper" (with Godsilla)	—	—	—	Südberlin Maskulin
2009	"Eine Chance/Zu Gangsta" (with Bushido)	26	26	—	Carlo Cokxxx Nutten 2
2010	"Berlins Most Wanted" (with Berlins Most Wanted)	31	57	—	Berlins Most Wanted
2012	"Bleib Wach/Pitbull" (with Silla)	—	—	—	Südberlin Maskulin II

=== As featured performer ===
Year	Title	Chart positions			Album
Year	Title	GER	AUT	SWI	Album
2005	"Jump, Jump" (DJ Tomekk featuring Fler and G-Hot)	3	17	25	Numma Eyns
2017	"CCNDNA" (Bushido featuring Fler)	43	54	31	Black Friday
2019	"Bundesweit" (King Khalil featuring Fler)	83	—	—	non-album tracks
2020	"Public Enemies" (Farid Bang featuring Fler and Kollegah)	12	—	27	non-album tracks
2020	"Olajuwon" (Farid Bang featuring Bass Sultan Hengzt, Sipo and Fler)	59	—	—	non-album tracks
2020	"Million Dollar Ass" (Katja Krasavice featuring Fler)	3	39	72	non-album tracks

== Guest appearances ==
- 2002: Cordon Sport Massenmord auf Aggro Ansage Nr. 1 von Aggro Berlin
- 2002: Küche oder Bett auf Berlin bleibt hart von Orgi 69 und Bass Sultan Hengzt
- 2002: Heavy Metal Payback und Zukunft (Electroghetto Remix) auf Aggro Ansage Nr. 2 von Aggro Berlin
- 2003: Kugelsicher auf Gemein wie 10 (Single) von Bushido
- 2003: Vaterland, Mein Revier, Asphalt, Zukunft, Dreckstück und Vom Bordstein bis zur Skyline auf Vom Bordstein bis zur Skyline von Bushido
- 2004: Zum Teufel mit den Regeln auf Einblick 3
- 2005: Was willst du tun auf Entfachte Macht von VS Mafia
- 2005: Jump, Jump (DJ Tomekk kommt) auf Numma Eyns von DJ Tomekk
- 2005: Mein Konto auf Das Mixtape von MC Bogy
- 2005: Willkommen in Berlin Remix und Abtörn Görl auf Rap City Berlin
- 2005: So fresh so clean auf Heiße Ware von B-Tight & Tony D
- 2005: Maxim ist King auf Maxim – Memorial Sampler
- 2005: Geballte deutsche Power auf Geballte Atzen Power von MC Bogy
- 2006: Heavy Metal Payback, Zukunft (Electroghetto Remix) und Champion auf Aggro Ansage Nr. 2X von Aggro Berlin
- 2006: G-Hot hat es geschafft, A.G.G.R.O Mafia, Ja, Ja, Ja, Ja, Ja und Wer will jetzt Streit auf Aggrogant von G-Hot
- 2006: Dumm fickt gut, Down und Goldkettentrend 2 auf Berliner Schnauze von Bass Sultan Hengzt
- 2006: Ich kling wie was auf Badboys von MOK
- 2006: Ghetto Beat und Identität auf Der neue Standard von Beathoavenz
- 2006: Ghettostarz auf Nichts war umsonst von Don Tone
- 2006: GZSZ auf Ich von Sido
- 2007: Was ich mach auf Auferstanden aus Ruinen von Joe Rilla
- 2007: Keiner kann was machen auf Ghetto Romantik von B-Tight
- 2007: Ein Fick ist ein Fick auf Dr. Sex von Frauenarzt
- 2007: Straßenmukke Remix und Alle für einen auf Hustler von MOK
- 2007: Wo sind die Ladies hin auf Ein Level weiter von Greckoe
- 2007: Sags ins Gesicht auf Krieg in Berlin von Manny Marc
- 2007: Straßenmukke auf Straßenmukke von MOK
- 2007: Outro und Ärgermann auf Totalschaden von Tony D
- 2007: Spielverderber auf Neger Neger von B-Tight
- 2007: Mein Sound, Gangster salutieren, Ein neuer Tag und Wir ändern uns nie auf Wir nehmen auch Euro von DJ Sweap & Pfund 500
- 2008: Deutschrap 2008 auf Manisch depressiv von Woroc & Dissput
- 2008: Disswut (Remix) auf Anders als du von Dissput
- 2008: Unser Leben und Aggrokalypse auf Ich und meine Maske von Sido
- 2008: Grau auf Geschichten die das Leben schreibt von Manuellsen
- 2008: Die Welt ist nicht genug auf Feiern mit den Pleitegeiern von Frauenarzt & Manny Marc
- 2009: Tag ein Tag aus auf Amnezia von Nyze
- 2009: Egoist auf Illegal von Automatikk
- 2010: Hör mal wer da hämmert auf Artkore von Nazar & Raf Camora
- 2010: Airmax auf Beton, Battle on the Rockz und Mit dem BMW auf Zeiten ändern dich von Bushido
- 2010: Deine Zeit kommt auf Kenneth allein zu Haus von Kay One
- 2010: Wo kommst du her? auf Halbblut von El-Mo
- 2010: Homie, SIDM, Cypher, Die Bombe und Maskulin ist im Gebäude auf Weiße Jungs bringens nicht von Reason
- 2011: Live aus Berlin und Nur der Mond ist mein Zeuge auf Silla Instinkt von Silla
- 2011: Die Welt dreht sich auf Ein Fall für zwei von DJ Sweap und DJ Pfund 500

== Free tracks ==
Year	Title	Info(s)
2004	"Hollywoodtürke" (Hollywood Turk)	Eko Fresh diss track
2005	"Du Opfer"^{1} (You loser) (with B-Tight)	Eko Fresh diss track
2007	"Hamma" (Awesome)	Instrumental from "Fully Loaded Clip" by 50 Cent
2007	"Pussydo Gay One"	Bushido & Kay One diss track; Excerpt from the intro music of Universal Pictures; Instrumental from "I Shot Ya" by LL Cool feat. Keith Murray
2008	"Grau" (Grey) (with Manuellsen)	
2008	"Hurensohn" (Son of a bitch) (feat. Silla & Reason)	Instrumental from "Grimey" by N.O.R.E.
2009	"Baby" (feat. Silla & Reason)	
2009	"Früher wart ihr Fans" (In the past you were fans) (feat. Kitty Kat & Silla)	Kollegah & Favorite diss track
2009	"Schrei nach Liebe" (Cry for love)	Kollegah diss track; Contains a sample of "Schrei nach Liebe" by Die Ärzte
2009	"Ursache und Wirkung" (Cause and effect)	
2010	"SIDM" (feat. Reason)	
2010	"Erst Ghetto, dann Promi" (First ghetto, then celeb)	Sido diss track; Instrumental from "Fuck Bitches Get Money" by Ya Boy; The music video was put online on 11 July 2010.
2011	"Deutschland deine Stars" (Germany your stars)	
2011	"Spiegelbild" (Remix) (Reflection) (feat. G-Hot, Silla and MoTrip)	
2013	"Mut zur Hässlichkeit" (Courage to be ugly)	Kollegah and Farid Bang diss track

Notes

- ^{1} "Opfer" means "Victim" in German, it is also an insult in the German slang language; meaning "Loser".

== DVDs ==
- 2006: Trendsetter DVD
- 2008: Südberlin Maskulin DVD
- 2009: Carlo Cokxxx Nutten 2 DVD
- 2010: Berlins Most Wanted DVD
- 2011: Airmax Muzik II DVD

== Music videos ==
- 2004: AggroberlinA
- 2004: Splitvideo zur Aggro Ansage Nr. 4
- 2005: NDW 2005
- 2005: Jump Jump (DJ Tomekk kommt)
- 2005: Nach Eigenen Regeln
- 2006: AggroberlinA 2006
- 2006: Papa ist zurück
- 2006: Çüs Junge
- 2006: Wir bleiben stehen
- 2006: Der Chef (Clip & Klar)
- 2006: G-Hot hat es geschafft (G-Hot feat. Fler)
- 2007: Mein Sound
- 2007: Was ist Beef?
- 2007: Das ist los!
- 2008: Deutscha Bad Boy
- 2008: Warum bist Du so?
- 2008: Wenn der Beat nicht mehr läuft (Frank White & Godsilla)
- 2008: Was los ?!? / Ich bin ein Rapper (Frank White & Godsilla)
- 2008: Unsere Zeit (Frank White & Godsilla)
- 2008: Splitvideo of Aggro Anti Ansage Nr. 8
- 2009: Check mich aus
- 2009: Ich sing nicht mehr für Dich (Fler feat. Doreen)
- 2009: Gangsta Rapper (Fler feat. Godsilla und Reason)
- 2009: Eine Chance / Zu Gangsta (Sonny Black & Frank White)
- 2010: SIDM (Reason feat. Fler – exklusiv über Flers YouTube-Kanal veröffentlicht)
- 2010: Mit dem BMW / Flersguterjunge (Fler feat. Bushido)
- 2010: Das alles ist Deutschland (Fler feat. Bushido)
- 2010: Erst Ghetto, dann Promi (Internet-Video)
- 2010: Schwer erziehbar 2010
- 2010: Berlins Most Wanted (mit Bushido und Kay One)
- 2010: Weg eines Kriegers (mit Bushido und Kay One)
- 2011: Nie an mich geglaubt
- 2011: Minutentakt
- 2011: Airmax
- 2011: Polosport Massenmord (mit MoTrip)
- 2011: Die Welt dreht sich (mit MoTrip und DJ Sweap / DJ Pfund 500)
- 2011: Spiegelbild
