= PA Sports =

German rapper

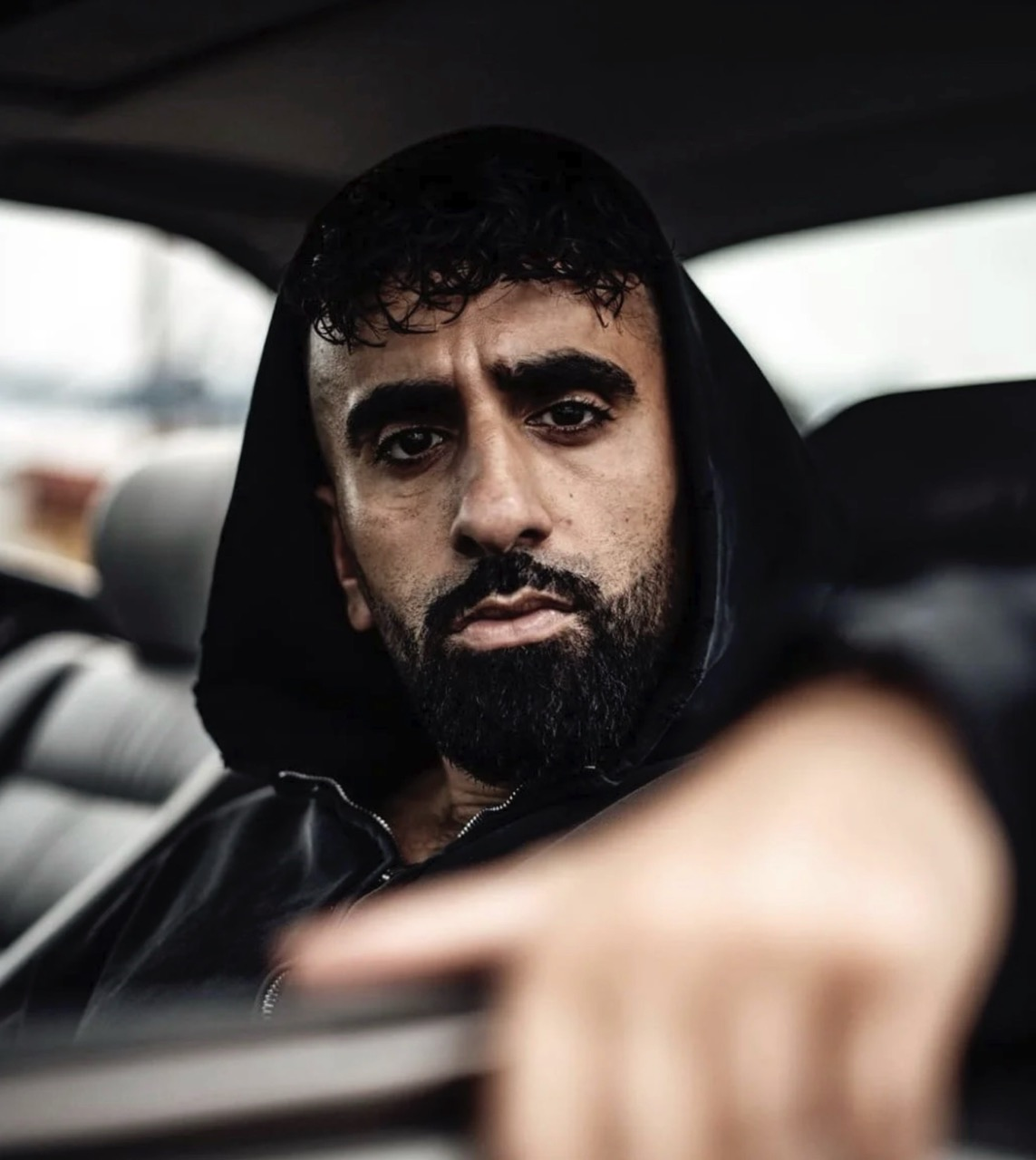
- PA Sports in 2024

Background information
- Born: Parham Vakili; April 1, 1990 (age 36); Essen, West Germany
- Occupation: Rapper
- Label: Life is Pain

Parham Vakili (Persian: پرهام وکیلی; born April 1, 1990), known professionally as PA Sports, is a German rapper and music producer. He has produced over a dozen albums and over fifty singles. He is also the founder and owner of the music label Life is Pain.

== Life and career ==
Vakili was born on April 1, 1990 in Essen, West Germany. His parents were both engineers who left Iran after the Iranian Revolution to study in Europe. He began to be interested in rap music as a teenager, taking part in freestyle competitions in the Ruhr area.

Through his freestyle rap, he came into contact with other German rappers, with Manuellsen being an important mentor in his early career. Manuellsen was one of the first artists signed to Eko Fresh's new label German Dream Entertainment and introduced the two. Eko Fresh invited PA Sports to participate in the music video for "Die Abrechnung", a diss track directed at Kool Savas. After this, PA Sports began working on music with German Dream Entertainment. Soon after, a verbal altercation with the rapper Favorite took place, which resulted in PA Sports publishing a diss track titled "Die Wiederbelebung" and Favorite publishing his own diss track "Die Wahrheit" in response. Their dispute was settled a few years later.

PA Sports originally planned to release his first solo album with German Dream Entertainment, but it never came out. Instead, he left the label and signed with the Mülheim-based label Shrazy Records. In early 2006, he founded the duo SAW with KC Rebell. The pair released the mixtape "Schwarz auf weiß" in September 2006. In 2007, he toured Germany with KC Rebell, Snaga, and Pillath.

In 2008, PA Sports was hospitalized with a collapsed lung. Later that year, SAW released their debut album, "Kinder des Zorns", on Shrazy Records. The album included guest contributions from Manuellsen, Jonesmann, Bero Bass, and Favorite, among others. Five months later, both PA Sports and KC Rebell left Shrazy Records, with PA Sports joining Manuellsen's record label Pottweiler Entertainment. In March 2009, PA Sports was attacked with a gas pistol at a shopping mall in Mülheim. He was able to dodge the attack, and the perpetrator was arrested. He stated that the attacker was known to him and that the incident was caused by a personal dispute. At the end of 2009, the single "Grausam" was released, featuring PA Sports alongside KC Rebell and Manuellsen. In April 2010, PA Sports fell out with Manuellsen and left his record label. Since then, he has focused more on his solo career.

In March 2011, PA Sports released his debut album, "Streben nach Glück". It included songs featuring the rappers Tua, and Silla, among others. Farid Bang was initially announced as a guest feature on the album, but he later withdrew. The album was released with six music videos.

In 2012, PA Sports released his second solo album, "Vom Glück zurück". 2012 also saw the release of the single "100 Bars Reloaded", a diss track against the rapper Haftbefehl. In 2013, he released the single "Gute Männer lieben schlechte Frauen" with Mehrzad Marashi. Later that year the album "Machtwechsel" was released, reaching 20th in the German charts. PA Sports also had a daughter born in 2013.

In 2014 he released his fourth album "H.A.Z.E.", which entered the German album charts at number seven. In February 2014, PA Sports founded his own record label, Life Is Pain. The rapper Kianush was his first signing. On September 19, 2014, he released the collaboration album "Desperadoz" together with Kianush. The album reached 14th in the German charts and also entered the top 100 in Austria and Switzerland.

In July 2015, his fifth solo album "Eiskalter Engel" was released. It charted 6th in Germany and Switzerland; and 15th in Austria.

In 2016, PA Sports became known outside the music scene for an interview in which he criticized Islamism, Antisemitism, and nationalism. Later that year he released the album "Zurück zum Glück". He also signed the rappers Moe Phoenix and Mosh 36 to his record label that year.

In 2017, he released the album "Verloren im Paradies". The same year he also moved to Berlin. In 2018, he signed the rapper Jamule to his record label. PA Sports stated he had paid €1,000,000 to sign Jamule, claiming it to be the largest-ever deal for a rap newcomer. Jamule's debut album "LSD" reached top ten in the charts in Germany, Austria, and Switzerland.

In late 2019, he signed the rapper Fourty. Fourty was the first rapper from Life is Pain to receive a gold status with the release of his single "Weisser Rauch" in 2020. The song has now reached platinum status in Germany, Austria and Switzerland. In April 2020, PA Sports produced the collaboration album "Crossover" together with Kianush. The album's lead single "Casino Royal" reached gold status in Germany, Austria, and Switzerland. The follow-up single "Kriminell" also achieved gold status in Austria and Switzerland. In June 2020, the parents of PA Sports were targeted in an arson attack on their car in Essen. There was speculation the arson was intended to intimidate PA Sports, but this was never confirmed. Also in 2020, he signed the rappers Hamzo 500 and Rua to Life is Pain. Rua was the first female artist to be signed by Life is Pain.

In 2021, PA Sports released his ninth solo album, "Streben nach Glück". During his promotional tour for the album, he stated that his experiences with psychedelic drugs were an inspiration for many of the songs. It was his best-performing album to date, reaching 2nd in Germany, 3rd in Austria, and 6th in Switzerland.

After completing a label tour with Kianush, Jamule, and Fourty, he released the song "Heaven", a cover version of the song of the same name by Bryan Adams. In the song he announced his relationship with his partner Luna, with whom he has two sons. The song reached gold status in Switzerland. In 2023, he signed the artist Yakary. In the same year, PA Sports released his tenth solo album "Life is Pain", which reached fourth place in the German album charts. The album's lead single "Doktor" features an appearance by Sido, Haftbefehl, and Alies. In early 2024, PA Sports moved from Berlin to North Rhine-Westphalia. In 2025, he released his latest album "Parham".

== Discography ==
=== Albums ===
Year	Title	Chart		
Year	Title	GER	AUT	SWI
2011	Streben nach Glück	–	–	–
2012	Vom Glück zurück	46	–	–
2013	Machtwechsel	20	52	19
2014	H.A.Z.E	7	14	9
2014	Desperadoz (with Kianush)	14	65	20
2015	Eiskalter Engel	6	15	6
2016	Zurück zum Glück	6	11	3
2017	Verloren im Paradies	5	10	9
2018	Desperadoz II (with Kianush)	5	8	7
2019	Keine Tränen	9	26	19
2020	Crossover (with Kianush)	2	5	7
2021	Streben nach Glück	2	3	6
2021	Desperadoz III (with Kianush)	13	32	13
2023	Life Is Pain	4	–	58
2023	Machtwechsel II	23	–	37
2025	Parham	5	17	74

=== Singles ===
Year	Title	Chart		
Year	Title	GER	AUT	SWI
2016	"TelVision" (Kianush feat. PA Sports, KC Rebell, and Kollegah)	40	52	94
2017	"HSHC" (feat. Kollegah)	89	–	–
2017	"Mörder" (with Kianush)	89	–	–
2017	"Sie will" (feat. RAF Camora and Bonez MC)	65	–	–
2018	"Habibi" (with Moe Phoenix)	87	–	–
2018	"30 km/h"	77	–	–
2019	"Push" (with Kianush and Mosh36)	48	–	–
2019	"Hellwach" (feat. Jamule and MoTrip)	41	–	–
2019	"Suizid" (with Kianush)	52	–	–
2019	"Casino Royal" (with Kianush)	28	63	–
2020	"Streit mit dem Mond" (with Kianush)	55	–	–
2020	"Kriminell" (with Kianush)	17	38	53
2020	"Cyberpunk" (with Kianush)	86	–	–
2020	"Crossover" (with Kianush)	50	–	–
2020	"Montrachet"	–	–	–
2020	"Sieben Jahre"	31	74	73
2020	"100 Bars Final Kill"	38	–	83
2020	"Streben nach Glück"	–	–	–
2020	"Outta Control" (Kianush feat. PA Sports)	–	–	–
2021	"Hell" (feat. Capital Bra)	5	10	12
2021	"Adé"	28	62	72
2021	"Squad X Showtime" (feat. Jamule, Kianush, Hamzo 500, Fourty and Rua)	33	50	72
2021	"Training Day" (with Kianush)	50	–	87
2021	"Shawty" (with Kianush; feat. Jamule)	8	21	36
2021	"Mörder II" (with Kianush; feat. Jamule)	–	–	–
2021	"Kapitel III" (with Kianush; feat. Jamule)	54	–	–
2021	"Drei Shotzzz" (with Kianush; feat. Jamule)	65	–	–
2021	"IDWK"	43	–	70
2021	"Nach Hause"	–	–	–
2021	"Over" (Kianush feat. PA Sports)	48	–	–
2021	"Enzo" (Xidir feat. PA Sports)	–	–	–
2021	"Doublecup" (feat. Jamule)	13	32	40
2021	"Rockstars" (with Kianush feat. Jamule)	45	–	–
2022	"Verlasse dich"	51	–	–
2022	"3" (feat. Fard and Asche)	100	–	–
2022	"Heaven"	17	52	51
2022	"Sunrise"	–	–	–
2022	"Me & My Girlfriend"	80	–	–
2022	"Ich denk an dich" (Elif feat. PA Sports)	92	–	–
2023	"150 Bars Infinity"	61	–	–
2023	"Alte Zeit"	–	–	–
2023	"Bist du da" (feat. Elif)	91	–	–
2023	"Modus Rap" (feat. Kool Savas and Azad)	48	–	–
2023	"Gute Frauen lieben schlechte Männer" (feat. Samra)	48	–	–
2023	"District 9"	–	–	–
2023	"Doktor" (feat. Sido, Haftbefehl and Alies)	22	67	54
2023	"Nicht alles gold" (with Azad; feat. Montez)	–	–	–
2023	"Für immer" (feat. Yakary)	69	–	–
2023	"Bei Nacht" (Eddin feat. PA Sports)	77	–	–
2023	"Es tut mir doch so leid" (Milano feat. PA Sports)	–	–	–
2023	"Blei" (Yakary feat. PA Sports)	–	–	–
2024	"Ich schwör bei Gott" (1986zig feat. PA Sports)	91	–	–
2024	"10 Sekunden" (Kianush feat. Yakary & PA Sports)	66	–	–
2025	"Last Dance" (feat. Mucco, Kianush, and Jamule)	50	–	–
