= Flersguterjunge =

Studio album by Fler
- Released: 11 June 2010
- Genres: Hip-hop, rap
- Label: ersguterjunge
- Producers: Djorkaeff, Beatzarre, Bushido

Fler chronology
Carlo Cokxxx Nutten 2 (2009)	Flersguterjunge (2010)	Berlins Most Wanted (2010)

Flersguterjunge is the fifth studio album by German rapper Fler, released on 11 June 2010 via ersguterjunge in both a standard and premium edition.

== Background ==
After the exit of Aggro Berlin and the reconciliation with his friend Bushido in early 2009, Fler joined ersguterjunge and later signed an author contract. He and Bushido then worked on Carlo Cokxxx Nutten 2, which released in September 2009. The only single "Eine Chance/Zu Gangsta" ranked No. 26 in the Media Control Charts and stayed seven weeks in the top 100.

According to Fler, he had he changed his rap style before the producing of the album. In an interview with Mixery Raw Deluxe, he explained that he chose the title Flersguterjunge (meaning "Fler is a good boy") to show that he had left his Aggro Berlin past behind.

== Chart performance and singles ==
Flersguterjunge entered the German Albums Chart at No. 4. In the following weeks, the album ranked No. 35, No. 57 and No. 72, before it left the top 100.

"Das alles ist Deutschland" was released as the album's lead single on 2 June 2010. The single features vocals of Bushido and singer Sebastian Krumbiegel, who reinterpreted the chorus of his group Die Prinzen's song "Deutschland". The music video was celebrate a day before its premier. The single entered the German singles chart at No. 28 and stayed five weeks in the top 100.

A video was shot for "Mit dem BMW/Flersguterjunge" and released as a so-called "street single".

== Track listing ==
- All songs are produced by Djorkaeff and Beatzarre, except track 20 (Michael Popescu).
- The tracks 10, 18, 20 and 21 are only featured on the premium edition.

No.	Title	Translation	Length
1.	"Intro"		0:39
2.	"Neues Ich"	New Me	3:24
3.	"Los, lauf!"	Come on, run!	3:35
4.	"Alle gefickt"	All fucked	3:48
5.	"Blaulicht bei Nacht" (featuring Bushido)	Blue light at night	3:09
6.	"Flersguterjunge" (featuring Bushido)		3:21
7.	"Das alles ist Deutschland" (featuring Bushido & Sebastian Krumbiegel)	All that is Germany	3:38
8.	"Alles ist vergänglich"	All things must pass	3:12
9.	"Schwer erziehbar 2010"	Difficult to educate 2010	3:31
10.	"Immer noch derselbe*"	Still the same	3:01
11.	"Halt mich fest" (featuring Reason)	Hold me tight	3:32
12.	"Ich spiel, um zu gewinnen"	I play to win	3:41
13.	"Kopfgefickt" (featuring Silla)	Head fucked	3:51
14.	"Russisch Roulette" (background vocal by Silla)	Russian roulette	3:19
15.	"Gewaltbereit"	Prepared to use violence	2:55
16.	"Labelboss" (Skit)		1:25
17.	"Bis zum Hals in der Scheiße"	To be up in shit creek	3:09
18.	"Zu viel geweint" (featuring Reason & Kay One)	Cried to much	3:56
19.	"Wer hätte das gedacht?"	Who'd have thought that?	3:41
20.	"Engel der Nacht" (featuring Puls)	Angel of the night	4:20
21.	"Mit dem BMW" (featuring Sonny Black (alias Bushido))	With the BMW	3:37

Samples

- "Flersguterjunge" contains samples of "Ein Mann Armee" by Bushido, "Komm klar, Spast" by Bushido & Fler and the "Yeah! Woo!" from "Think (About It)" by Lyn Collins
- "Das alles ist Deutschland" contains a sample of "Deutschland" by Die Prinzen
- "Kopfgefickt" contains a sample of "Secret Robes" by Matthew Corbett & Mike Wilkie
- "Russisch Roulette" contains a sample of "Timeless" by Lee Groves & Peter Marett
- "Mit dem BMW" contains samples of "Carlo Cokxxx Flashback" by Bushido & Fler
