= Krumbiegel =

Krumbiegel is a German surname. Notable people with the surname include:

- Gustav Hermann Krumbiegel (1865–1956), German botanist
- Martin Krumbiegel (born 1963), German tenor, musician and musicologist, brother of Sebastian
- Paulina Krumbiegel (born 2000), German footballer
- Sebastian Krumbiegel (born 1966), German singer and musician, brother of Martin
- Ulrike Krumbiegel (born 1961), German actress
