= Elixier =

German musical

- Music: Tobias Künzel, Wolfgang Lenk (Die Prinzen)
- Lyrics: Kati Naumann
- Productions: 1997 Leipzig, Germany

Elixier is a German musical that premiered in 1997 in Leipzig, Germany under the direction of Horst Königstein. The music was written by Tobias Künzel and Wolfgang Lenk (Die Prinzen), with lyrics by Kati Naumann.

== Plot ==
The musical is set in 1978. In East Germany, in an industrial city, a young chemist, David, sits working. He lives only for science. He must find a formula for the acquisition of eternal youth. He does not notice how his friend Hagen uses and deceives him. Then David meets and falls in love with the dancer, Betti. Hagen also is interested in Betti, but the girl is fascinated by David's intelligence and innocence and returns his love. David searches for the elixir now to ensure that Betti's youth and beauty will never fade. When David encounters surprising research results, he is ready to try the potion together with Betti. But the potion fails, their problems overwhelm them, and they lose sight of each other.

Almost twenty years later, much has changed in the city. The clever Hagen has become the chief partner in the chemistry enterprise. David is his employee, and the partners and employees are set against each other. A youthful Betti appears, and the old charm is again there. But the mysterious Betti disappears again, as quickly as she had arrived. David sinks into his memories of earlier times. Hagen has also recognized Betti. Did the elixir work? Will Betti forgive David or choose Hagen?
