= Pheromone (disambiguation) =

Pheromone is a chemical that triggers a social response in members of the same species.

Pheromone may also refer to

- Pheromones (Animal Alpha album)
- Pheromones (The Hard Aches album)
- "Pheromone", song by Fler from Blaues Blut
- "Pheromone", song by Prince from Come (Prince album)
