= Jamule =

German rapper

- Born: Jamal Manuel Issa Serrano; 22 November 1996 (age 29); Duisburg, Germany
- Origin: Essen, Germany
- Genres: German hip-hop; trap
- Occupation: Rapper
- Years active: 2013–present
- Label: Life is Pain

Jamal Manuel Issa Serrano (Arabic: جمال مانويل عيسى سيرانو; born 22 November 1996) and known professionally as Jamule, is a German rapper of Spanish and Lebanese descent from Essen. He is the son of the late Passion Fruit member Maria Serrano Serrano.

== Life ==
Jamule's mother was from Duisburg, Germany and his father from Lebanon. Immediately after birth, his parents moved to Mülheim, and a year later to Essen, where he grew up in the borough Kray. He went to school in Mülheim, and thus constantly commuted. His mother Maria Serrano Serrano was a member of the German Eurodance trio Passion Fruit, who died in a plane crash on 24 November 2001 when Jamule was 5 years old.

In October 2018 he signed a contract with Life is Pain, a label from the German rapper PA Sports. According to PA Sports' statement, Jamule got the biggest advance payment for a German newcomer ever. "Ich hol dich ab" (English: I pick you up,) was his first top-10 single. With the song "Unterwegs" (English: On the way,) he worked together with the rap producer team KitschKrieg and reached the top of the Official German singles chart in September 2020.

== Discography ==
=== Albums ===
Year	Title	Peak chart positions		
Year	Title	GER	AUT	SWI
2020	LSD	5	8	10
2021	Sold	16	7	17
2022	Magic	7	20	18

=== EPs ===
Year	Title	Peak chart positions		
Year	Title	GER	AUT	SWI
2019	Ninio	40	51	87

=== Singles ===
Year	Title	Peak chart positions			Album
Year	Title	GER	AUT	SWI	Album
2018	"NBA"	97	–	–	Nino
2018	"10,9"	–	–	–	Nino
2019	"Rooftop"	64	–	–	Nino
2019	"Sex Sells" (feat. PA Sports)	76	–	–	Nino
2019	"Mamma Mia"	84	–	–	Non-album singles
2019	"Dollarzeichen"	67	–	–	Non-album singles
2019	"Money Honey Drip"	23	38	44	LSD
2019	"1000 Hits" (with Cro)	14	13	30	LSD
2019	"Athen" (with Luciano)	21	37	48	LSD
2020	"Ich hol dich ab"	5	23	38	LSD
2020	"Schiebedach"	44	–	92	LSD
2020	"Scheiß drauf"	22	40	65	Non-album single
2020	"MedMen"	16	21	35	Sold
2020	"Fastlane" (feat. Nico Santos)	9	17	29	Sold
2020	"13" (with Chilla)	7	31	37	Sold
2020	"Blutige Tränen X Rockstar"	35	–	78	Sold
2021	"No Comprendo" (feat. Capital Bra)	3	5	16	Sold
2021	"Overdose"	22	17	26	Sold
2021	"Liege wieder wach"	3	7	16	Sold
2021	"Schizophren"	38	63	86	Sold
2021	"Wenn ich geh"	9	20	23	Non-album singles
2021	"Intro"	46	–	94	Non-album singles
2021	"Normal für mich" (feat. Miksu & Macloud)	13	32	37	Non-album singles

=== Featured in ===
Year	Title	Peak chart positions			Album
Year	Title	GER	AUT	SWI	Album
2019	"No Way" (Badchieff feat. Jamule)	–	–	–	Non-album singles
2020	"XXL" (Miksu & Macloud feat. Luciano, Jamule & Summer Cem)	2	2	3	Non-album singles
2020	"Unterwegs" (KitschKrieg feat. Jamule)	1	7	17	KitschKrieg
2020	"Heute Nacht" (with Fourty)	67	–	–	London Dry
2021	"Aventador" (Capital Bra feat. Jamule)	4	7	11	Non-album single
2021	"Squad X Showtime" (PA Sports feat. Jamule, Kianush, Hamzo 500, Fourty, Rua)	33	50	72	Streben nach Glück
2021	"Frag mich nicht" (Miksu & Macloud feat. Nimo & Jamule)	2	4	11	Futura
2021	"Bobby" (Veysel feat. Jamule)	21	45	50	Hitman 2
2021	"Happy Birthday" (Farid Bang feat. Jamule)	33	68	80	Asozialer Marokkaner
2021	"Shawty" (PA Sports & Kianush feat. Jamule)	8	21	36	Desperadoz III
2021	"Purple Rain" (Jazn feat. Jamule)	50	–	–	Non-album single

=== Other charted songs ===
Year	Title	Peak chart positions			Album
Year	Title	GER	AUT	SWI	Album
2019	"Batman" (Kool Savas feat. Jamule)	48	–	100	KKS
2019	"Selfie" (Kianush feat. Jamule)	69	–	–	Non-album singles
2019	"Hellwach" (PA Sports feat. Jamule & MoTrip)	41	–	–	Non-album singles
2019	"63" (Kalim feat. Jamule)	86	–	–	Null auf Hundert

== Awards and nominations ==
=== Results ===
Year	Award	Nomination	Work	Result	Ref.
2019	HipHop.de Awards	Best Newcomer National	Himself	Nominated	
2019	Hype Awards	Breakthrough Artist	Himself	Won	
2020	Bravo Otto Awards	Newcomer / Breakthrough	Himself	Nominated	
2021	Bravo Otto Awards	Hip-Hop national	Himself	Nominated	
