= Fler (album) =

Studio album by Fler
- Released: 2009
- Genres: Hip-hop, german rap
- Label: Aggro Berlin

Fler chronology
Südberlin Maskulin (2008)	Fler (2009)	Carlo Cokxxx Nutten 2 (2009)

Fler is the self-titled fourth solo studio album by German rapper Fler, released 27 March 2009. It was his last work released via Aggro Berlin.

== Musical content ==
The album contains besides battle rap-like tracks, also deeper and personal songs that therms Fler's difficult and reflective past about his arrest in a psychiatry ("Mein Haus") and his school time ("Schulsong"). In the songs "Ewigkeit" and "Ich werde nie vergessen", Fler reviewed past moments that had affected him the most.

== Track listing ==
No.	Title	Producer(s)	Length
1.	"Intro (FDM)" (FDM = Fick deine Mutter means Fuck your mother)	Djorkaeff & Beatzarre	2:42
2.	"Check mich aus" (Check me out)	Djorkaeff	3:16
3.	"Meine Straße" (My street)	Djorkaeff	4:02
4.	"Ewigkeit" (Eternity)	Djorkaeff	3:13
5.	"Ich sing nicht mehr für dich" (I sing no more for you, featuring Doreen Steinert)	Djorkaeff & Beatzarre	3:32
6.	"Macht & Ruhm" (Power & fame, featuring Sido)	Djorkaeff & Beatzarre	3:36
7.	"Mein Haus" (My house)	Djorkaeff & Beatzarre	3:37
8.	"Usw." (Etc.)	Djorkaeff	3:03
9.	""Gangsta" Rapper" (featuring Godsilla & Reason)	Djorkaeff & Shuko	3:34
10.	"Schulsong" (School song)	Djorkaeff	3:51
11.	"Rap Electroschock" (featuring Godsilla)	Djorkaeff & Beatzarre	3:08
12.	"Scheiss auf dich" (Screw you, featuring Bass Sultan Hengzt)	Djorkaeff	2:59
13.	"Sag warum!?" (Say why!?)	Paul NZA & Marek Pompetzki	3:49
14.	"Was ist Peace??!?!" (What is peace??!?!, featuring Godsilla & Sera Finale)	Djorkaeff & Beatzarre	3:57
15.	"Ich f*** dich" (I f*** you)	Beatzarre	3:30
16.	"Ich werde nie vergessen" (I never gonna forget, featuring Beatzarre)	Djorkaeff	3:22

Samples

- The melody of "Ich sing nicht mehr für dich" is similar to "My Life" by Game feat. Lil Wayne
- "Mein Haus" contains an interpolation of "Our House" by Madness
