= Muhabbet =

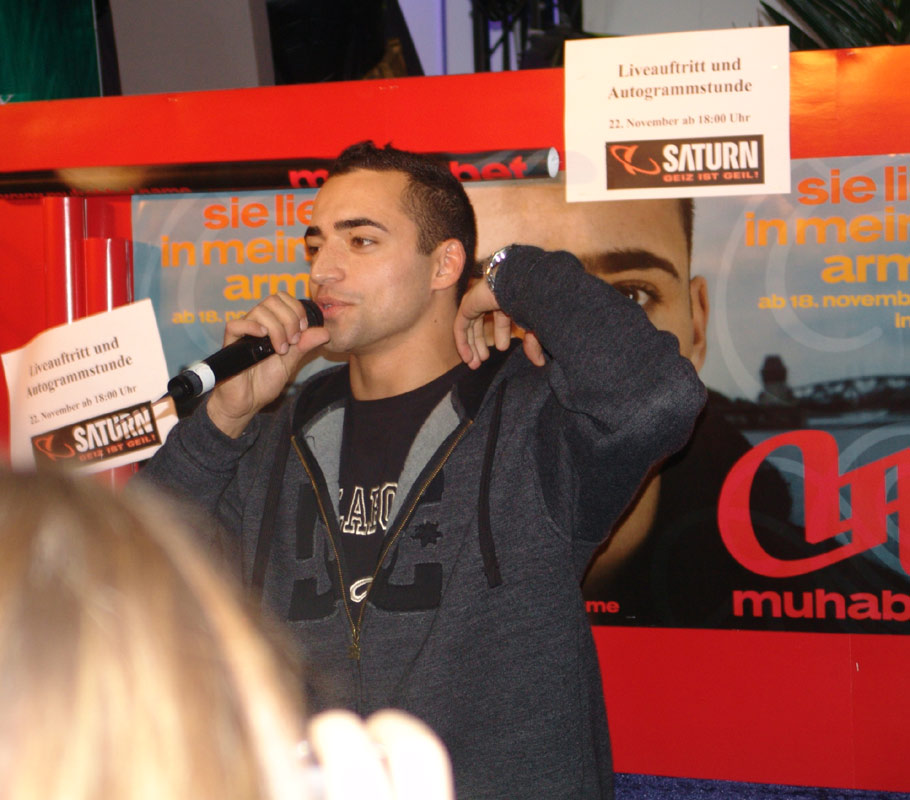

Background information
- Birth name: Murat Ersen
- Born: 3 August 1984 (age 40)
- Origin: Cologne, Germany
- Genres: R&B, pop, Soul, R'n'Besk
- Occupation(s): Singer-songwriter, actor
- Instrument(s): Vocals, guitar, piano
- Years active: 2005–present
- Website: muhabbet84.com

Murat Ersen (born 3 August 1984), known professionally as Muhabbet, is a Turkish-German singer.

== Discography ==
=== Albums ===
Year	Title	Chart-position		
Year	Title	GER	AUT	SWI
2005	Orientalo	–	–	–
2006	R'nBesk	54	–	–
2007	R'nBesk – In Deinen Straßen	–	–	–
2009	Das Album	–	–	–
2009	Sen İstedin	–	–	–
2013	Susmam	–	–	–
2013	Universum	–	–	–
2013	Melekler Şahit	–	–	–
2014	Imtraumgesehn	–	–	–
2016	Deine Erinnerung	–	–	–
2016	Aklimdan Gecenler	–	–	–
2017	Seninle Uyanmadan	–	–	–
2018	Das Album	–	–	–
2018	Kıymet	–	–	–

=== Singles ===
Year	Title	Chart-position		
Year	Title	GER	AUT	SWI
2005	Sie liegt in meinen Armen	15	48	36
2006	Ich will nicht Geh'n	29	–	–
2007	Schau Hin!	44	–	–
2007	Deutschland (Muhabbet & Friends)			
2009	Sen İstedin	–	–	–

Featured in

Year	Title	Chart-position		
Year	Title	GER	AUT	SWI
2006	Çüş Junge (Fler feat. Muhabbet)	50	–	–
2007	Verbotene Liebe (Alpa Gun feat. Muhabbet)	89	–	–

== Filmography ==
Year	Film	Role	Notes
2007	Evet, I Do!	Kenan	
