= R'n'Besk =

Genre of music

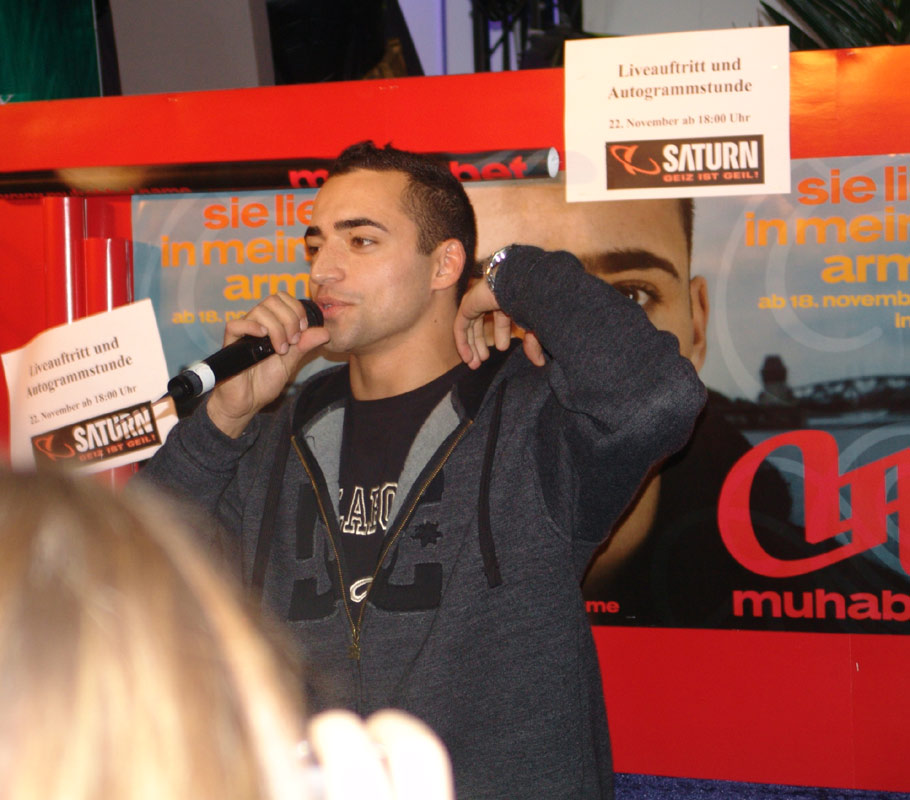
Muhabbet, referred to as the most famous R'n'Besk singer in Germany.

R'n'Besk is a genre of music that originated by mixing Turkish arabesque and American rhythm and blues.

The genre originated in Germany among Turkish immigrant youths. It is very popular among young Turkish people in Western Europe.

The best-known artists who produce music in the genre are the German-Turkish Muhabbet (1984) and the German-Turkish duo musical band CanKan (formed in 1998).

== See also ==
- Arabesque (Turkish music)
