= Lary (singer) =

German singer (born 1986)

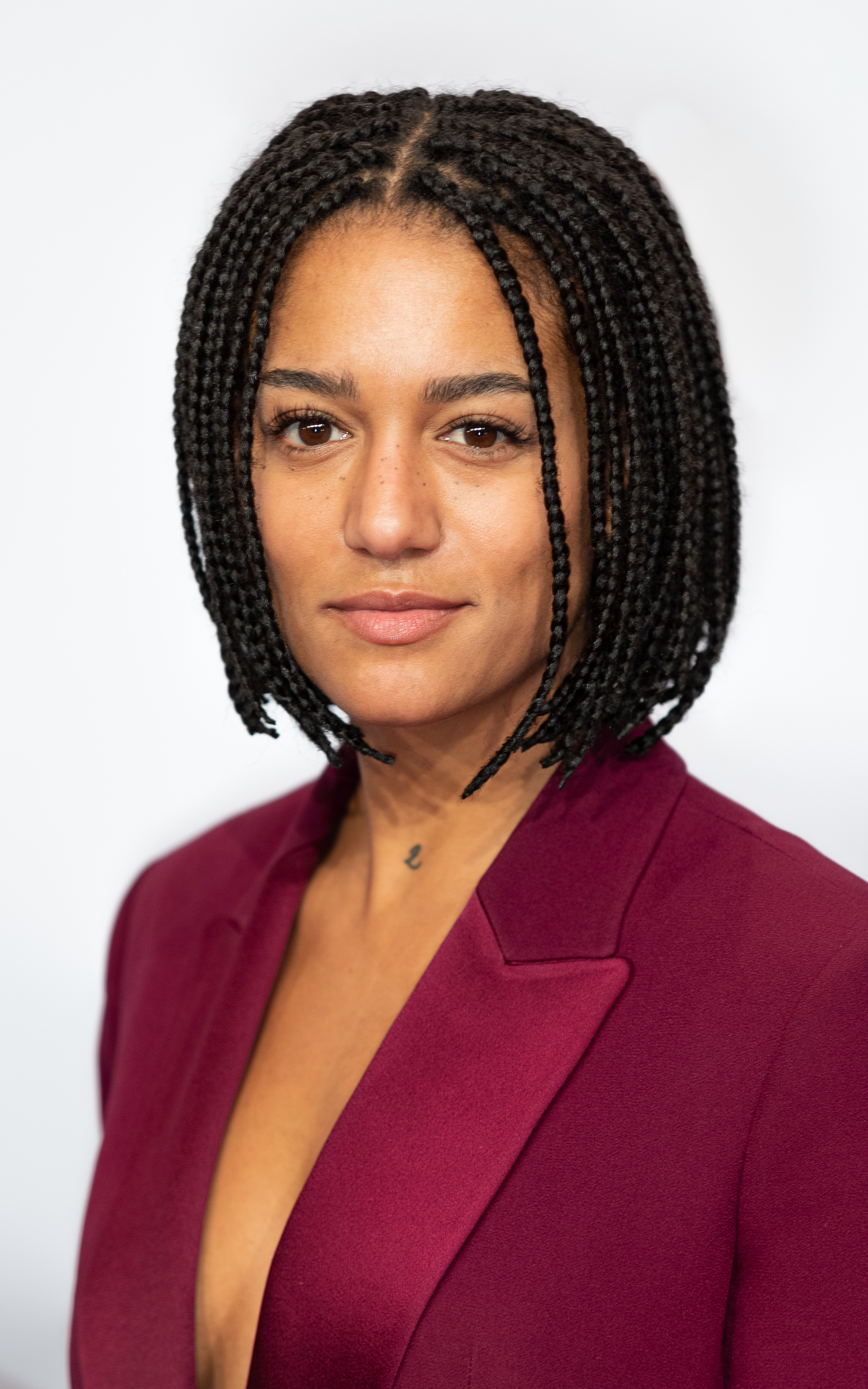
- Lary (2016)

Background information
- Birth name: Larissa Sirah Herden
- Also known as: Lary Lou; Lary Poppins
- Born: 20 June 1986 (age 39); Gelsenkirchen, Germany
- Genres: Pop; R&B; hip hop
- Occupation: Singer
- Years active: 2012–present
- Website: larysays.com

Larissa Sirah Herden (born 20 June 1986), known professionally as Lary, is a German singer and actress.

== Career ==
In 2014 she dropped her debut album FutureDeutscheWelle — that's how she describes the type of her music — with the singles System, Sirenen, Jung & Schön, Kryptonit, Propeller and Bedtime Blues. One year later, in 2015 she was featured on German rapper MoTrips hit single So wie du bist, which was certified platinum in Germany. In 2017 she released the single Lieblingssongs along with German rapper and singer Olson.

On 4 May 2018, Lary released the song Das neue Schwarz as the first single of her second studio album Hart fragil, which was released on 20 July 2018. The second single Mond was released on 1 June 2018.

== Discography ==
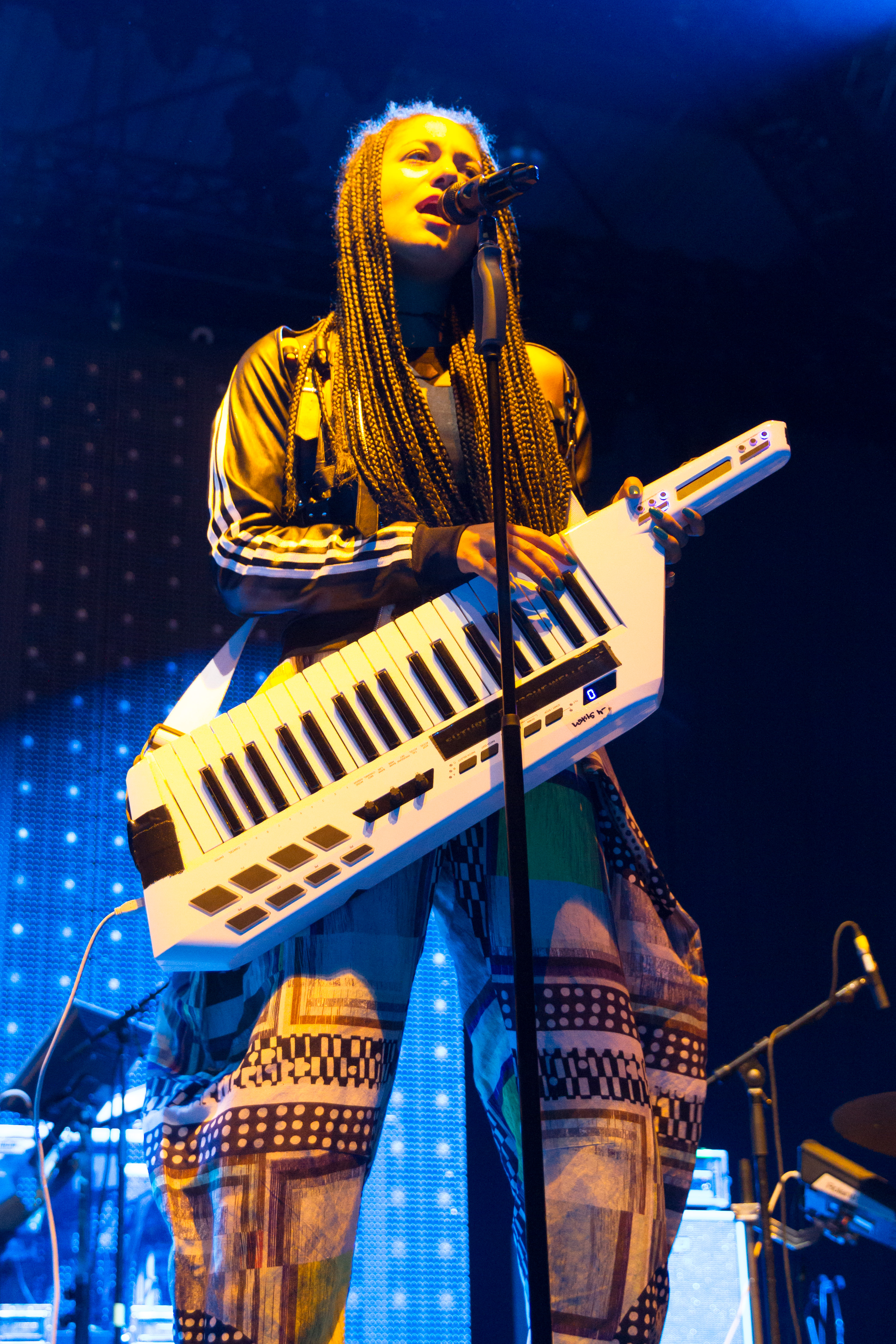
Lary performing in 2015

=== Albums ===
| Title | Album details |
|---|---|
| FutureDeutscheWelle | Released: 5 September 2014; Label: Department Musik; Format: CD, digital download |
| Hart fragil | Released: 20 July 2018; Label: URBAN; Format: CD, digital download |

=== Singles ===
| Title | Year | Album |
|---|---|---|
| "System" | 2013 | Future Deutsche Welle |
| "Sirenen" | 2013 | Future Deutsche Welle |
| "Jung & Schön" | 2014 | Future Deutsche Welle |
| "Problem" | 2014 | Future Deutsche Welle |
| "Kryptonit" | 2014 | Future Deutsche Welle |
| "Propeller" | 2015 | Future Deutsche Welle |
| "Bedtime Blues" | 2015 | non-album-singles |
| "Lieblingssongs" (with Olson) | 2017 | non-album-singles |
| "Das neue Schwarz" | 2018 | Hart fragil |
| "Mond" | 2018 | Hart fragil |
| "Sand" (featuring MoTrip) | 2018 | Hart fragil |
| "Taxi" | 2020 | non-album-singles |
| "Zeit" | 2021 | non-album-singles |
| "Puxxy" | 2021 | non-album-singles |
| "Krieger" | 2021 | non-album-singles |
| "Junge" | 2024 | |
