= Tobias Künzel =

German pop artist and composer (born 1964)

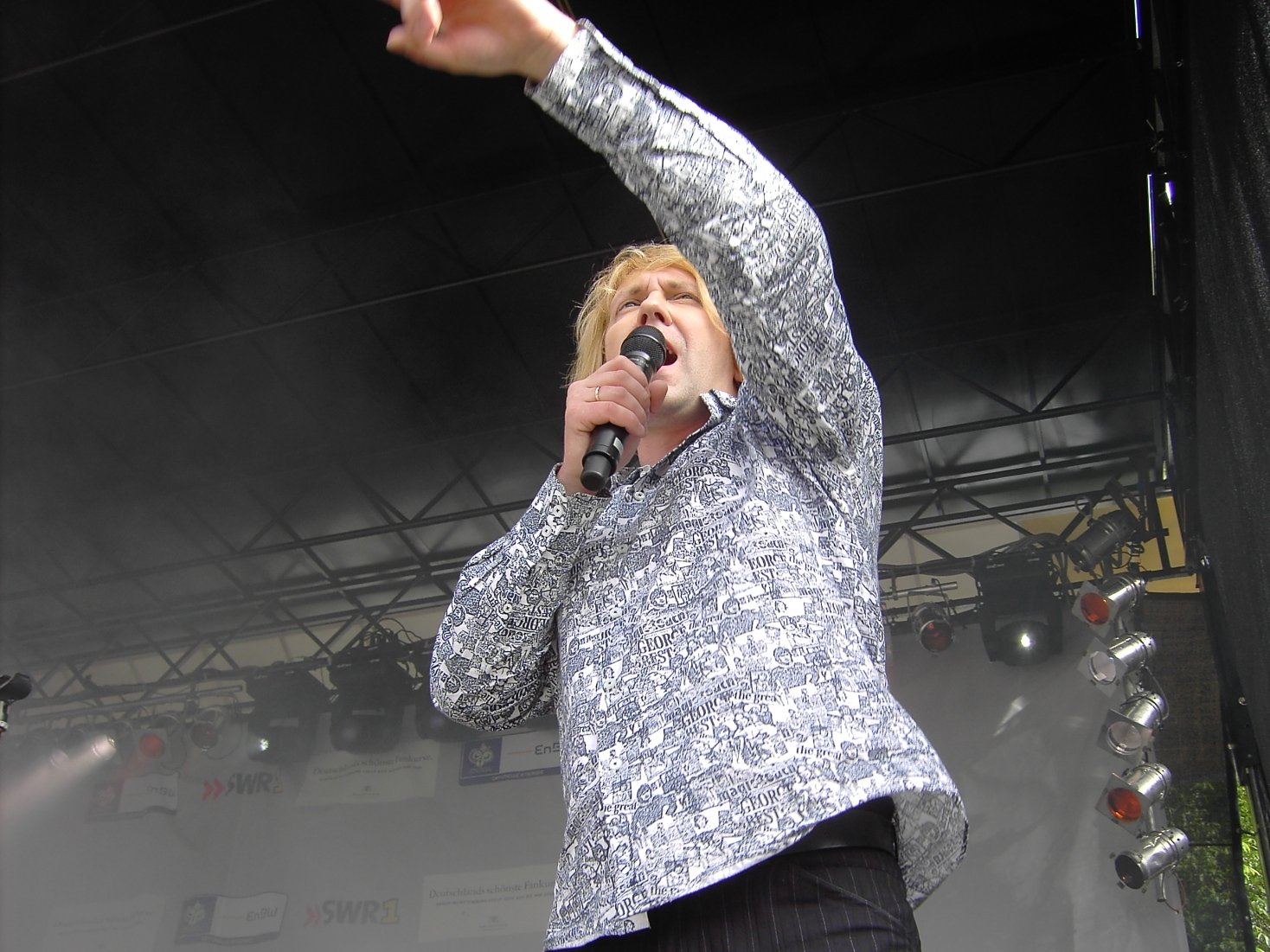
Tobias Künzel

Tobias Künzel (born 26 May 1964 in Leipzig) is a German pop artist and composer, best known as one of the lead singers for the group 'Die Prinzen'.

== Career ==
Künzel attended the Thomasschule zu Leipzig, that time GDR, where he became a member of the Thomanerchor in 1973. He graduated in 1982 (Abitur), then served in the NVA (Nationale Volksarmee). From 1984 until 1988, he studied drums and voice at the Musikhochschule Leipzig in Germany. Back in his school days, Künzel and his friend Dirk Posner started the Band 'Puma' (a sort of abbreviation for PUnk MAchine), where he played drum set. He was also a drummer in his brothers band. During his studies the Musikhochschule Leipzig, he joined the group 'Amor & Die Kids' in 1985. Their biggest hit was 'Komm doch mit (zu 'nem Ritt auf dem Sofa)'. He also founded the group Final Stap, where he mainly played drums and only sang "incidentally".

He began singing with the group Die Prinzen in 1990, though he maintains that his first love will always be drumming. He continues to sing with them today.

In addition, in 1998 Künzel composed music and acted in the musical Elixir in Leipzig, which proved successful with more than 40 sold-out performances in Leipzig. He owns his own recording studio where he does production work for up-and-coming bands and music for television, theater and musicals. He has produced music for the German children's quiz show 1, 2, oder 3, and the child's musical Urmel fliegt ins All (Urmel flies into space). Künzel has been a guest star on several television programs, and he was seen on two episodes of Lindenstraße and Schloss Einstein.

Künzel has been a guest lecturer in pop music at several universities. He occasionally teaches lessons at the Martin Luther University of Halle-Wittenberg, and also at the University of Leipzig. He is also the official ambassador of the "Fans for Kids e. V." group for children with cancer. Since 2007 he has regularly supported the Bolivian civil rights movement "ConTraDo".

In 2009 he was an alternate member on the board of GEMA—Gesellschaft für musikalische Aufführungs- und mechanische Vervielfältigungsrechte (The Society for Musical Performing and Mechanical Reproduction Rights), representing the composers, lyricists and publishers rights to their musical works in Germany.

== Life ==
Künzel currently lives in London.
