= Südberlin Maskulin =

Studio album by Frank White & Godsilla
- Released: 2008
- Recorded: 2007
- Genres: Hip-hop, rap
- Label: Aggro Berlin

Frank White & Godsilla chronology
Fremd im eignen Land (2008)	Südberlin Maskulin (2008)	Fler (2009)

Südberlin Maskulin is a collabo album by German rappers Fler (alias Frank White) and Godsilla.

== Track listing ==
No.	Title	Length
1.	"Erster Track (Intro)" (First Track, featuring Beko)	2:27
2.	"Dein Leben" (Your life)	2:41
3.	"Vater unser" (Our Father)	3:13
4.	"Skit 1" (featuring Uebelst)	0:43
5.	"Ich bin ein Rapper" (I am a rapper)	3:24
6.	"Bizz Action Drive" (featuring King Orgasmus One)	3:52
7.	"Glaub an dich" (Believe in yourself, featuring She-Raw)	4:14
8.	"Was Los?!?" (What's on?!?)	3:12
9.	"Auf der Straße" (On the street)	3:06
10.	"Wenn der Beat nicht mehr läuft" (When the beat stops)	2:46
11.	"Unsere Zeit" (Our time)	2:46
12.	"Alqaida auf Deutsch" (Al-Qaeda in German)	2:38
13.	"Skit 2"	0:43
14.	"Zunami Business" (Tsunami business)	3:09
15.	"Schlaflos" (Sleepless, featuring Sido & Ozean)	4:10
16.	"Maskulin Maskulin" (Masculine masculine, featuring Bass Sultan Hengzt)	3:32
17.	"Zu oft" (Too often)	3:25
18.	"Seit MTV" (Since MTV)	3:14
19.	"Letzter Track (Deine Frau)" (Last track (Your wife))	2:58

Premium edition
No.	Title	Length
1.	"Ghetto im Kopf" ([The] Ghetto in the head, featuring Ozan)	3:35
2.	"Nacht und Nebel Aktion 2" (Night and mist action 2)	3:36
3.	"Comeback"	3:01
4.	"Mehr Kohle" (More cash, featuring Frauenarzt & Reason)	4:27
5.	"Wie Du mir so ich Dir" (What goes around, comes around, featuring Sera Finale)	3:23
6.	"Jeden Tag" (Every day)	3:05

Additional the Downstairs Edition features a 35 minute long DVD.
