= Carlo Cokxxx Nutten 2 =

Studio album by Bushido and Fler
- Released: 11 September 2009
- Recorded: 2009
- Genre: German hip hop
- Label: ersguterjunge
- Producers: Bushido; Martin Stock (exec.); Dirk Niemeyer; Beatzarre; Djorkaeff; DJ Stickle

Bushido and Fler chronology
Carlo Cokxxx Nutten (2002)	Carlo Cokxxx Nutten 2 (2009)

Bushido chronology
Heavy Metal Payback (2008)	Carlo Cokxxx Nutten 2 (2009)	Zeiten ändern dich (2010)

Fler chronology
Fler (2009)	Carlo Cokxxx Nutten 2 (2009)	Flersguterjunge (2010)

Singles from Carlo Cokxxx Nutten 2
- 1. "Eine Chance/Zu Gangsta" Released: 28 August 2009

Carlo Cokxxx Nutten 2 is a 2009 collaboration album between German rappers Bushido and Fler. The album was titled as second part, but is actually the third part of the Carlo Cokxxx Nutten albums.

During the production Bushido confirmed that the album release as Carlo Cokxxx Nutten 3, but it later changed to Carlo Cokxxx Nutten 2 – Reloaded and finally Carlo Cokxxx Nutten 2.

The double A-side single "Eine Chance/Zu Gangsta" reached number 26 in the Media Control Charts from Germany and Austria.

== Information ==
On this album, Bushido and Fler used again the pseudonyms "Sonny Black" and "Frank White", like they did it on the 2002 album Carlo Cokxxx Nutten. The beats for the album were actually planned for the soundtrack of the movie Zeiten ändern dich.

On 1 April 2009, Berlin label Aggro Berlin closed down as Fler had left the label a week earlier. After the label bosses showed officially on their homepage that the label had closed down, Bushido contacted Fler and both artists became again friends.

== Musical style ==
Similar to Carlo Cokxxx Nutten, the album contains battle rap songs with typical gangsta rap themes, such as crime and violence. The album also contains deeper songs, such as "Zukunft (Part 2)", which reflects on the rappers' friendship and the six years of feud between them.

== Track listing ==
No.	Title	Producer(s)	Length
1.	"Intro"	Bushido	0:57
2.	"Reloaded"	Bushido & Martin Stock	3:27
3.	"Carlo Cokxxx Flashback"	Bushido	2:58
4.	"Zwei Turntables und ein Mic" (Two turntables and one mic)	Bushido	3:47
5.	"Eine Chance" (One chance)	Bushido & Martin Stock	4:07
6.	"Ich wollte eigentlich nur rappen" (I just wanted to rap)	Bushido	3:29
7.	"Der Song lacht" (The song laughs)	Bushido	3:17
8.	"Komm klar, Spast!" (Get over it, retard!)	Bushido	3:33
9.	"Ich war noch nie wie die" (I was never like them)	Bushido	4:08
10.	"Zukunft (Part 2)" (Future (part 2))	Bushido & Martin Stock	3:30
11.	"Unsterblichkeit" (Immortality)	Bushido & Martin Stock	3:28
12.	"Die Krähen kreisen" (The crows are circling)	Bushido & Martin Stock	3:28
13.	"Albtraum" (Nightmare)	Bushido & Martin Stock	3:16
14.	"Vorbild" (Role model)	Bushido & Martin Stock	3:54
15.	"Highlife"	Bushido & Martin Stock	3:03
16.	"Ich rap für" (I rap for)	Bushido & Martin Stock	4:08
17.	"Zu Gangsta" (Too gangsta)	Bushido & Martin Stock	3:26

Premium edition (bonus disc)
No.	Title	Producer(s)	Length
18.	"Zeiten ändern sich (Part 2)" (Times are changing (part 2))	Bushido	3:27
19.	"Wie ein Tattoo" (Like a tattoo)	Bushido & Martin Stock	3:05
20.	"Strassengangsound" (Streetgangsound)	Bushido & Martin Stock	3:50
21.	"Ich rap für" (remix featuring Kay One)	Bushido	4:08

== Samples ==
- "Ich war noch nie wie die"
  - "Vaterland" by Bushido feat. Fler
  - "Du bist out" by Bushido (alias Sonny Black) & Baba Saad
- "Zukunft (Part 2)"
  - "Zukunft" by Bushido feat. Fler
- "Highlife"
  - "Dreckstück" by Bushido feat. Fler
- "Zu Gangsta"
  - "I'm a Hustla" by Cassidy
  - "Boss" by Bushido & Fler (alias Sonny Black & Frank White)
  - "Fight Music" by D12

== Personnel ==
- Mastered by – Dirk Niemeyer
- Mixed by – Beatzarre
- Recorded by – Djorkaeff (tracks 2–17)
- Scratches – DJ Stickle (tracks 4, 9, 10, 15, 16, 17)

== Charts ==
Chart (2009)	Peak position
Austrian Albums (Ö3 Austria)	5
German Albums (Offizielle Top 100)	3
Swiss Albums (Schweizer Hitparade)	9
