= Blaues Blut =

Studio album by Fler
- Released: May 19, 2013
- Recorded: 2012–13
- Genres: Hip-hop, trap
- Length: 63:21
- Label: Maskulin
- Producer: Hijackers (exec.)

Fler chronology
Hinter blauen Augen (2012)	Blaues Blut (2013)

Blaues Blut is a studio album by German rapper Fler. It was released on April 19, 2013, under his record label Maskulin. The album features guest appearances from Silla, Jihad, and Animus. The album was supported with the official singles "Barack Osama" and "Pheromone", in addition to the promotional tracks "Biggest Boss", "Mut zur Hässlichkeit", and "Meine Farbe". Upon its release, Blaues Blut was met with generally positive reviews from music critics. The album debuted at number three on the Media Control Charts.

== Background ==
In December 2012, Fler announced that Blaues Blut will be published on March 1, 2013. Later, he changed the release date first to March 22, 2013, then to April 5, 2013. In March 2013, he announced Blaues Blut for the April 19, 2013. In April 2013, he released the track list from the album. He also named the producers Hijackers (Producers, Bo Diggler and Mminx) and the guest appearances from Silla, Jihad, and Animus.

== Promotion ==
The first single, "Barack Osama", was released on February 8, 2013. The battle-track reached number 68 in Germany. Then, Fler published the freetrack, "Biggest Boss" and later the disstrack, "Mut zur Hässlichkeit". Besides these, he released the freetrack, "Meine Farbe" On April 12, 2013, the second single, "Pheromone", was released. Later, Fler published the videos "Echte Männer" and "Chrome". The video "Chrome" was shot by French director Chris Macari.

== Track listing ==
No.	Title	Length
1.	"Neue Deutsche Hasswelle / Intro" (New German hate wave)
2.	"Pheromone"
3.	"Biggest Boss"
4.	"Neureicher Wichser" (New-rich motherfucker)
5.	"Produkt der Umgebung (feat. Jihad)" (product of the environment)
6.	"7ner (Skit)"
7.	"Meine Farbe" (My colour)
8.	"Chrome"
9.	"Blaues Blut" (Blue blood)
10.	"Grizzly (feat. Animus)"
11.	"Barack Osama"
12.	"In der S-Klasse (Skit)"
13.	"Skrupellos (feat. Jihad)" (Ruthless)
14.	"Echte Männer (feat. Silla & Jihad)" (Real men)
15.	"City Boy (feat. Jihad)"
16.	"Mut zur Hässlichkeit" (Courage under ugliness)
17.	"Blue Magic"
18.	"Die Liga der Kriminellen (feat. Silla & Jihad)" (Criminal league)
19.	"Maschine (feat. Animus & Jihad)" (machine)
20.	"German Dream"

== Chart positions ==
=== Weekly charts ===
Chart (2013)	Peak position
German Albums (Offizielle Top 100)	3
Austrian Albums (Ö3 Austria)	5
