= Martin Krumbiegel =

German opera singer

- Born: 1963 (age 62–63); Leipzig
- Education: Thomanerchor; University of Leipzig
- Occupations: Classical tenor; Conductor; Musicologist
- Organizations: Leipziger Oratorienchor; University of Music and Theatre Leipzig

Martin Krumbiegel (born 1963) is a German classical tenor, conductor and musicologist. A member of the Thomanerchor as a boy, he is mostly active in oratorios, cantatas and vocal chamber music of the 17th and 18th centuries. Krumbiegel has been the conductor of the Leipziger Oratorienchor since its beginning in 1993, and of ensembles such as Fidicianan and Vox Humana. He is a professor of musicology at the University of Music and Theatre Leipzig.

== Career ==
Martin Krumbiegel was born in Leipzig in 1963, the brother of Sebastian Krumbiegel. He was a member of the Thomanerchor from 1973 to 1982. He studied musicology at the University of Leipzig and graduated in 1994 with a doctorate; his dissertation was about Melchior Franck's Geistliche Konzerte. He also undertook private voice training with Andreas Sommerfeld.

Since 1987 he has performed as a concert and oratorio singer, including appearances at the Leipzig Gewandhaus, the Berlin Schauspielhaus, the Semperoper in Dresden and the Kölner Philharmonie. He has regularly collaborated as a soloist with the Bach cantata performances of the Thomanerchor. In the Bach year 2000, he performed in concerts in St. Martin, Idstein, including Bach's cantatas for Easter, Erfreut euch, ihr Herzen, BWV 66, and for Pentecost, Erschallet, ihr Lieder, erklinget, ihr Saiten! BWV 172, as well as songs such as "So oft ich meine Tobackspfeife", BWV 515, from the Notebook for Anna Magdalena Bach, also known as the "Pipe Aria".Tours abroad led him to the Czech Republic, France, the Netherlands, Sweden and Lithuania.

As a teacher, he was first a lecturer at the University of Music and Theatre Leipzig from 1994, appointed professor of the Institute of Musicology on 14 April 2010.

He has been a co-founder and artistic director of the Leipziger Oratorienchor from 1993. From 2001 he has been the conductor of the ensemble Capella Fidicinia Leipzig, dedicated to the music of the 15th to 18th century. From 2002, Krumbiegel has been the artistic director of the vocal ensemble Herrenwieser Vokalensemble, a group of 18 singers from Germany and Switzerland who meet once a year and tour Brandenburg, with a repertoire from early Baroque to contemporary. In 2012 he founded the chamber choir Vox humana and has been its artistic director.

Krumbiegel has recorded for disk (CD), radio and television. With the Leipziger Oratorienchor, he recorded live major choral works by Bach, his Mass in B minor (1999 and 2003), St John Passion (2002), Christmas Oratorio (2002) and St Matthew Passion (2006), singing the part of the Evangelist himself in the Passions.
