= Fler =

German rapper

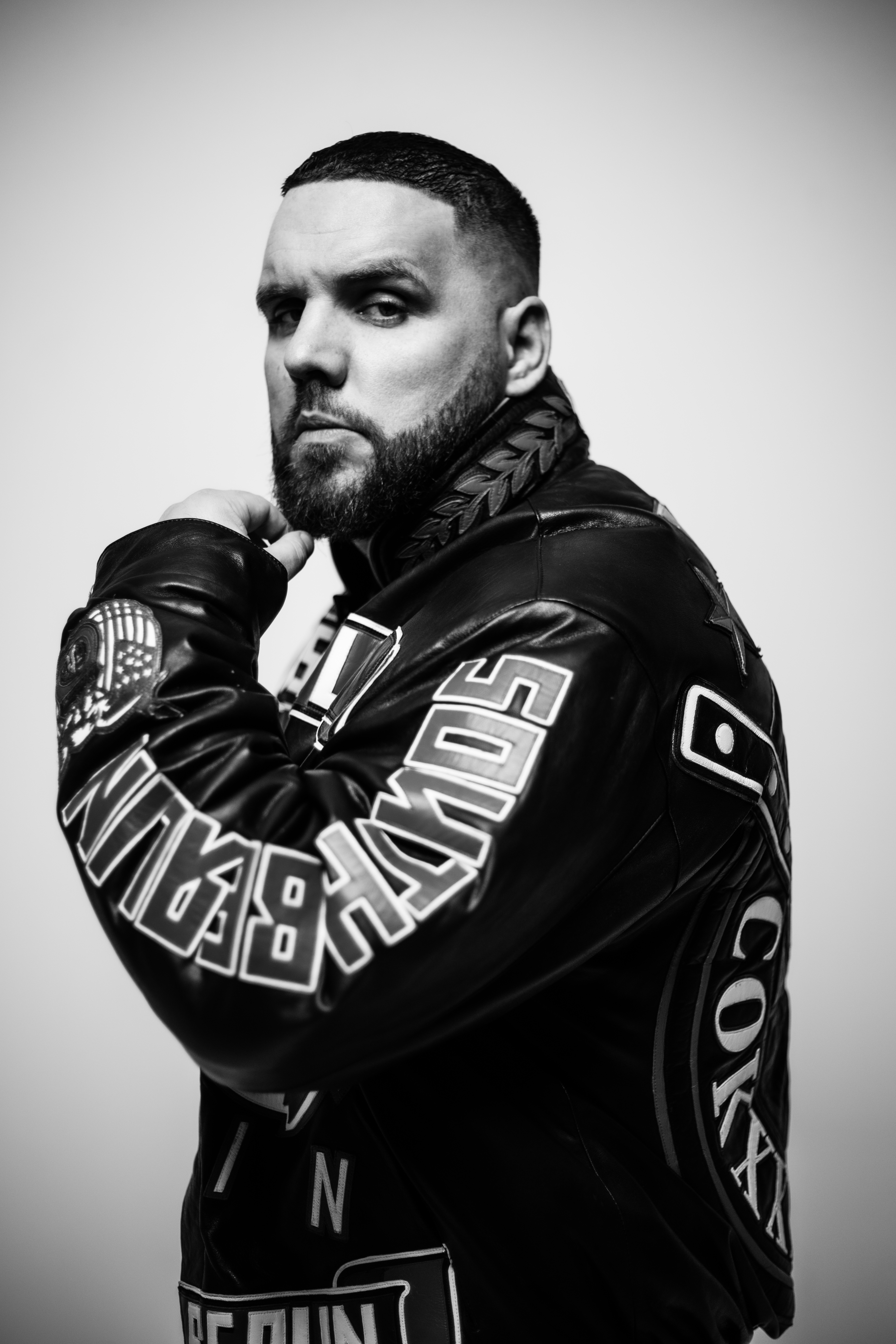
- Fler in 2022

Background information
- Also known as: "Frank White"
- Born: Patrick Losenský; 3 April 1982 (age 44); Berlin, Germany
- Genres: German hip-hop, drill
- Occupation: Rapper
- Years active: 1999–present
- Labels: Aggro Berlin (2003–2009); Maskulin (2011–present)
- Website: maskulin.de

Patrick Losenský (born 3 April 1982), known professionally as Fler, is a German rapper and the CEO of Maskulin Music Group.

== Career ==
=== 2000–2006: Beginnings ===
Fler was first recognized in the rap scene through collaborations with Bushido. Together, they released the collaborative album titled Carlo Cokxxx Nutten in October 2002. Fler had five feature parts on Bushido's first studio album, Vom Bordstein bis zur Skyline, released July 2003.

Fler released his first solo album, Neue Deutsche Welle, on 1 May 2005. The first single was "NDW 2005", with a sample of Falco's "Rock Me Amadeus". The album was considered controversial due to perceived right-wing extremist lyrics.

In 2006, Fler released his second solo album titled Trendsetter. The first single "Papa ist zurück" reached No. 23 in Germany and No. 32 in Austria. The second single "Cüs Junge" was less successful; it reached No. 50 in Germany and No. 75 in Austria.

On 27 September 2007 at 18:00, after co-hosting MTV TRL: Urban show, Fler was attacked by three unknown men armed with knives. One of his bodyguards was able to hold them off, while Fler left through the rear entrance. Nobody was harmed.

=== 2008–2010: Growth ===
On 25 January 2008, Fler released his third solo album Fremd im eigenen Land. The choice of the title was controversial due to a 1993 song of the same name by Advanced Chemistry. There was also a 2007 album, Airmax Muzik.

Fler had been in a quarrel with Bushido. After the Aggro Berlin recording label closed, he contacted Bushido and they officially showed their reconciliation with a photo shoot and interview for Bravo HipHop Special. They created another collaborative album, Carlo Cokxxx Nutten 2. Its only single, "Eine Chance/Zu Gangsta", was released on 28 August 2009 and reached No. 26 in Germany and Austria. The album was released on 11 September and reached No. 3 in the Media Control Charts. Bushido stated on the album's website that he "never believed" it would have such success considering the lack of promotion or digital release.

Fler's fifth studio album, Flersguterjunge, was released in June 2010 through ersguterjunge.

=== 2011–2013: Maskulin label ===
The logo of Maskulin

On 11 February 2011, the song "Nie an mich geglaubt" from Fler's sixth album, Airmax Muzik II, was leaked on the Internet as digital single with two remixes, an instrumental version and video shot in New York City. The single entered the German charts at No. 64. The album was released on 8 April through Fler's record label, Maskulin, and reached No. 6 on the charts on the 17th calendar week of 2011 (25 April – 1 May). The premium edition featured two bonus songs and a 30-minute DVD about the rapper's childhood, with private photos and home movies, and interviews with his stepfather, Shizoe, Silla and others.

Fler's eighth solo album, Hinter blauen Augen, was released on 2 November 2012 and reached No. 3 in Germany. Music videos were made for the songs "Nummer 1", "Hinter blauen Augen", "La Vida Loca" and "Du bist es wert". The single "Nummer 1" reached No. 92 on the German charts. On 8 February 2013, the single "Barack Osama" appeared five days before the music video on YouTube. An instrumental single and a remix version with the rappers Silla and G-Hot was also available. The single rose to No. 68 on the German charts. In April 2013, the album Blaues Blut was released on Maskulin, and reached No. 3 on the German charts.

== Influences ==
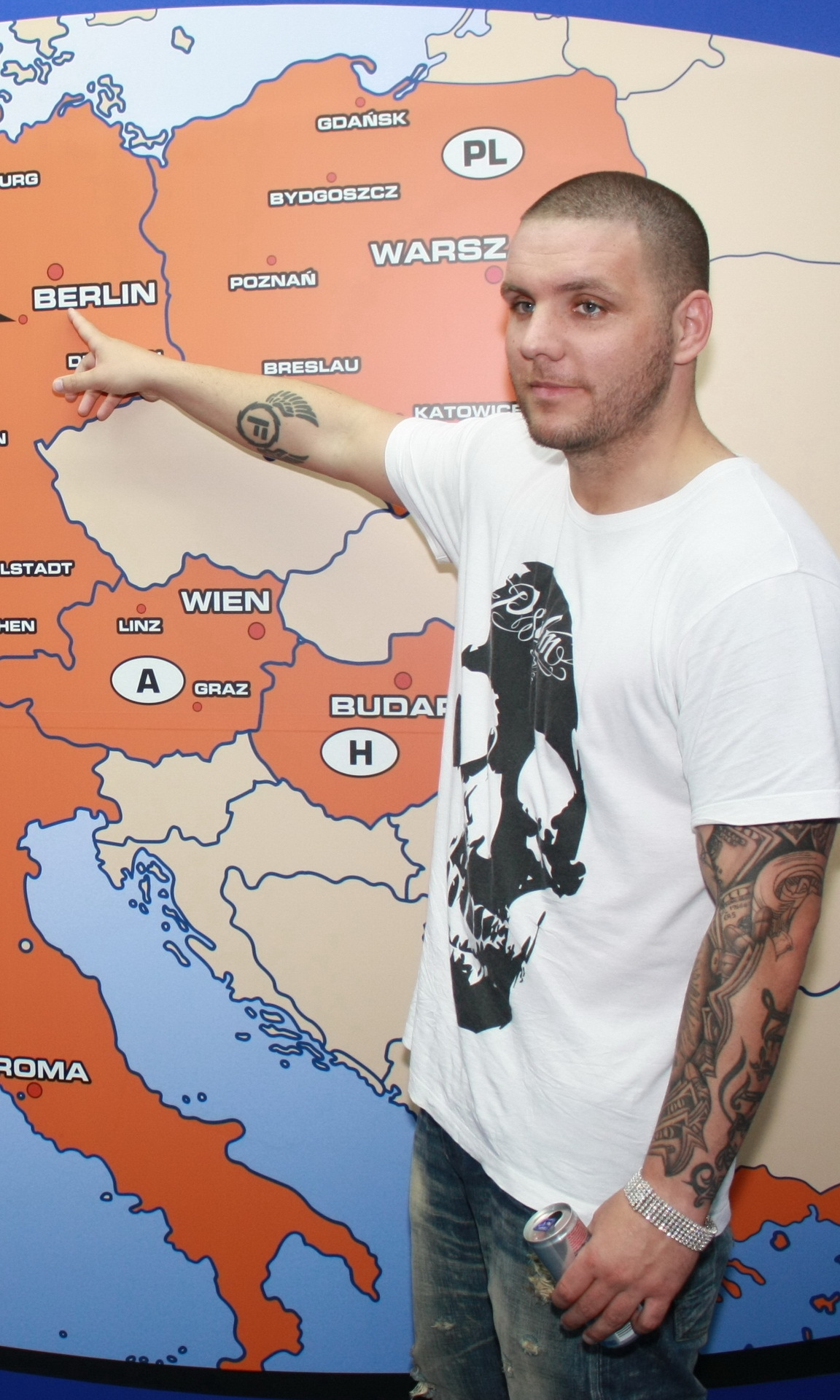
Fler in 2011

Fler has cited several American rappers as his influences including Mobb Deep, 50 Cent, Lunatic and Juelz Santana.

== Feuds ==
=== Eko Fresh ===
In 2004, Eko Fresh released the diss track "Die Abrechnung" (English: The Reckoning), that mainly attacks Kool Savas, but also referred to various German rappers, including Bushido, Sido and Fler.

In December 2004, Fler responded with "Hollywoodtürke" (English: Hollywood Turk), which mocked Eko Fresh as a "wanna be gangster" and also references the label Royal Bunker and rapper Bushido.

Big Derill, Marcus Staiger and Boba Fettt of Royal Bunker responded with "Wer? Fler?" (English: Fler who?) and Eko Fresh with "FLERräter" (a wordplay on verräter, meaning "traitor"), a track from his mixtape Fick noch immer deine Story, that also features Bushido. The feud continued as Fler and B-Tight dissed Eko Fresh on the track "Du Opfer" (English: You victim).

Eko Fresh released a diss track titled "F.L.E.R." in 2006, rapping over the beat of his single "L.O.V.E.". Fler responded on his 2007 mixtape Airmax Muzik, mentioning Eko Fresh on some tracks. After that, both rappers kept quiet for some time. In 2011, Fler name-dropped Eko Fresh in his song "Autopsie", featured on the mixtape Airmax Muzik II. Following that, Eko Fresh tweeted with irony to his fans, to buy Fler's album and called the song "whack".

=== Kollegah ===
On 11 March 2009, the artists of label Selfmade Records released Chronik 2. It features the track "Westdeutschlands Kings" by Kollegah, Favorite and Farid Bang, a diss track aimed at Sido, Fler and Kitty Kat.

On 20 March, Kollegah released "Fanpost", where he insulted Fler calling him a "fat Kraut" and mocked him claiming that he was penetrated with a carrot. Fler responded with the song titled "Schrei nach Liebe" (English: Scream for love), which was based on the song of the same name by Die Ärzte. After that, both rappers were quiet for nearly a year. In 2011, Fler name-dropped Kollegah in his song "Autopsie".

In 2013, after the release of Kollegah and Farid Bang's collaboration album Jung, brutal, gutaussehend 2, Fler released a track called "Mut zur Hässlichkeit" (English: Courage to ugliness), in which he made fun of their image and also imitates them.

== Business ventures ==
In March 2010, Fler opened his clothing store Psalm 23, in Berlin-Wilmersdorf. The shop was later renamed Flerstore. In December 2011, the brick-and-mortar store was closed in favor of online sales for clothing and merchandise. Since 2013, he has also established his own line of collections for his fashion brand, Maskulin.

== Discography ==
=== Studio albums ===
- 2005: Neue Deutsche Welle
- 2006: Trendsetter
- 2008: Fremd im eignen Land
- 2009: Fler
- 2010: Flersguterjunge
- 2011: Airmax Muzik II
- 2011: Im Bus ganz hinten
- 2012: Hinter blauen Augen
- 2013: Blaues Blut
- 2014: Neue Deutsche Welle 2
- 2015: Keiner kommt klar mit mir
- 2015: Weil die Straße nicht vergisst
- 2016: Vibe
- 2018: Flizzy
- 2019: Colucci
- 2020: Atlantis
- 2021: WIDDER

=== Collaboration ===
- 2002: Carlo Cokxxx Nutten (with Bushido)
- 2008: Südberlin Maskulin (with Godsilla)
- 2009: Carlo Cokxxx Nutten 2 (with Bushido)
- 2010: Berlins Most Wanted (with Berlins Most Wanted)
- 2012: Südberlin Maskulin II (with Silla)
- 2017: Epic (with Jalil)
- 2022: Cancel Culture Nightmare (with Bass Sultan Hengzt)
- 2023: Welle Vol. 1 (with Bass Sultan Hengzt and Rosa)
