= MoTrip =

German rapper of Lebanese descent

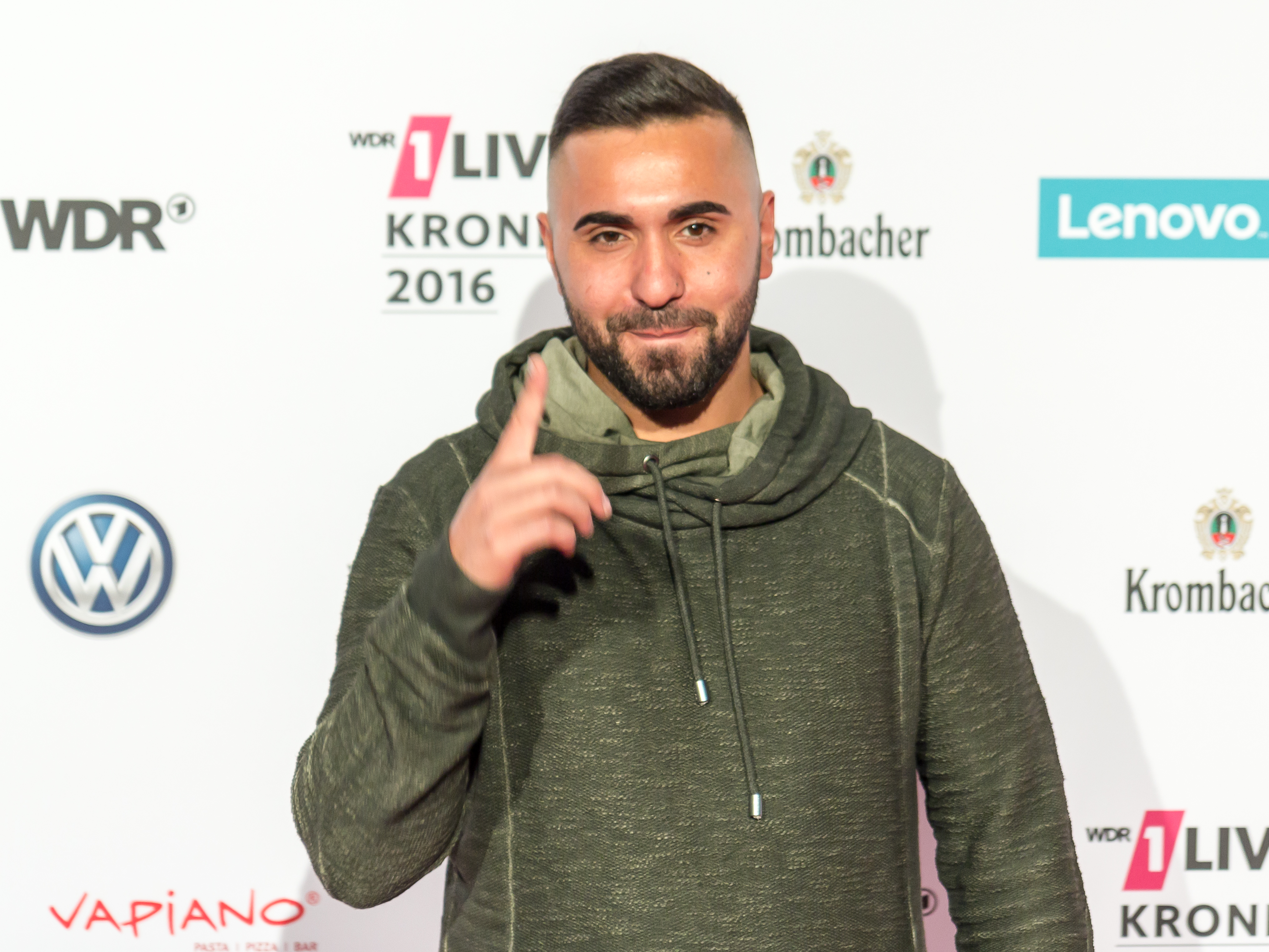
- MoTrip in 2016

Background information
- Born: Mohamed El Moussaoui; 7 March 1988 (age 38); Beirut, Lebanon
- Origin: Aachen, Germany
- Genres: Rap; alternative rap; trap
- Occupation: Rapper
- Label: Universal Music

Mohamed El Moussaoui (Arabic: محمد الموسوي), known by the stage name MoTrip (born 7 March 1988), is a German rapper of Lebanese descent. His stage name uses the first syllable of his name and plays off the Arabic word for "singer" or "lyricist". MoTrip came into his own with hits such as 2013's "Guten Morgen NSA" ("Good Morning NSA") and his 2015 song "So wie du bist" ("Just as you are"). Since 2011, he has been under contract with Universal Music.

== Early life ==
Mohamed El Moussaoui was born in Beirut, Lebanon, though his family fled the country during the Lebanese Civil War. He grew up in Aachen, at Germany's borders with Belgium and the Netherlands. El Moussaoui's older brother was also a rapper and the young MoTrip began writing his first lyrics at the age of 15. Aachen was also the hometown of Turkish-German rapper Kool Savas, who took notice of the up-and-coming MoTrip. With the promotion of Kool Savas, MoTrip was able to make important industry connections and promote his work.

== Career ==
According to MoTrip, he has written or contributed to writing many German-language rap tracks performed by other artists. He says that all of the lyrics he performs, however, are his own words. While MoTrip has not indicated for whom he has written music, in 2011, German rapper Eko Fresh claimed on Twitter that MoTrip wrote the Fler album Airmax Muzik II. MoTrip is also credited as a co-author on the 2012 album AMYF by Berlin rapper Bushido.

MoTrip's first album, Embryo, was released in 2011. His first charting single did not come until his 2013 song "Guten Morgen NSA" ("Good Morning NSA"). In the context of the United States' National Security Agency spying controversy, MoTrip mocked NSA surveillance for hacking his Game Boy. Comparing the NSA to the 'Stasi', the official state security service of East Germany, MoTrip was echoing a comparison first made by German chancellor Angela Merkel. The song also remarks on MoTrip's status as an Arab in Europe.

The 2015 album Mama featured the hit single "So wie du bist" ("Just as you are"), which became MoTrip's highest charting song, reaching number 3 on the German charts. The track featured German vocalist Lary who appeared as a stripper in the music video, romantically pursued by MoTrip. The song remained at number 51 on the charts until it was featured as background music for a Beats by Dre commercial, which focused on German football player Bastian Schweinsteiger and his departure from long-time club Bayern Munich to join Manchester United. The commercial catapulted the song to the top of the charts.

== Discography ==
=== Studio albums ===
- 2012: Embryo
- 2015: Mama

=== Collaboration albums ===
- 2018: Mohamed Ali (with Ali As)

=== Singles ===
- 2012: Keiner hier ist Rap (with Genetikk)
- 2013: Guten Morgen N.S.A (feat. Elmo)
- 2015: So wie du bist (feat. Lary)
- 2018: Immer wieder (with Rooz)
- 2019: Genau wie du
- 2020: Wenn du mich liebst

== Awards and nominations ==
=== Results ===
Year	Award	Nomination	Work	Result	Ref.
2010	HipHop.de Awards	Best Newcomer National	Himself	Nominated	
2011	HipHop.de Awards	Best Newcomer National	Himself	Won	
2011	HipHop.de Awards	Best Collaboration	Himself (with Samy Deluxe)	Nominated	
2011	HipHop.de Awards	Best Single National	Albtraum	Nominated	
2012	HipHop.de Awards	Best Rap-Solo-Act National	Himself	Nominated	
2012	HipHop.de Awards	Best Release National	Embryo	Won	
2012	HipHop.de Awards	Best Song National	Triptheorie (ft. Marsimoto)	Nominated	
2015	1LIVE Krone Awards	Best Album	Mama	Nominated	
2015	1LIVE Krone Awards	Best Hip-Hop Act	Himself	Nominated	
2015	HipHop.de Awards	Best Release National	Mama	Won	
2016	Echo Awards	Best Video National	So wie du bist (ft. Lary)	Longlisted	
2016	1LIVE Krone Awards	Best Hip-Hop Act	Himself	Nominated	
