= Die Prinzen =

German band

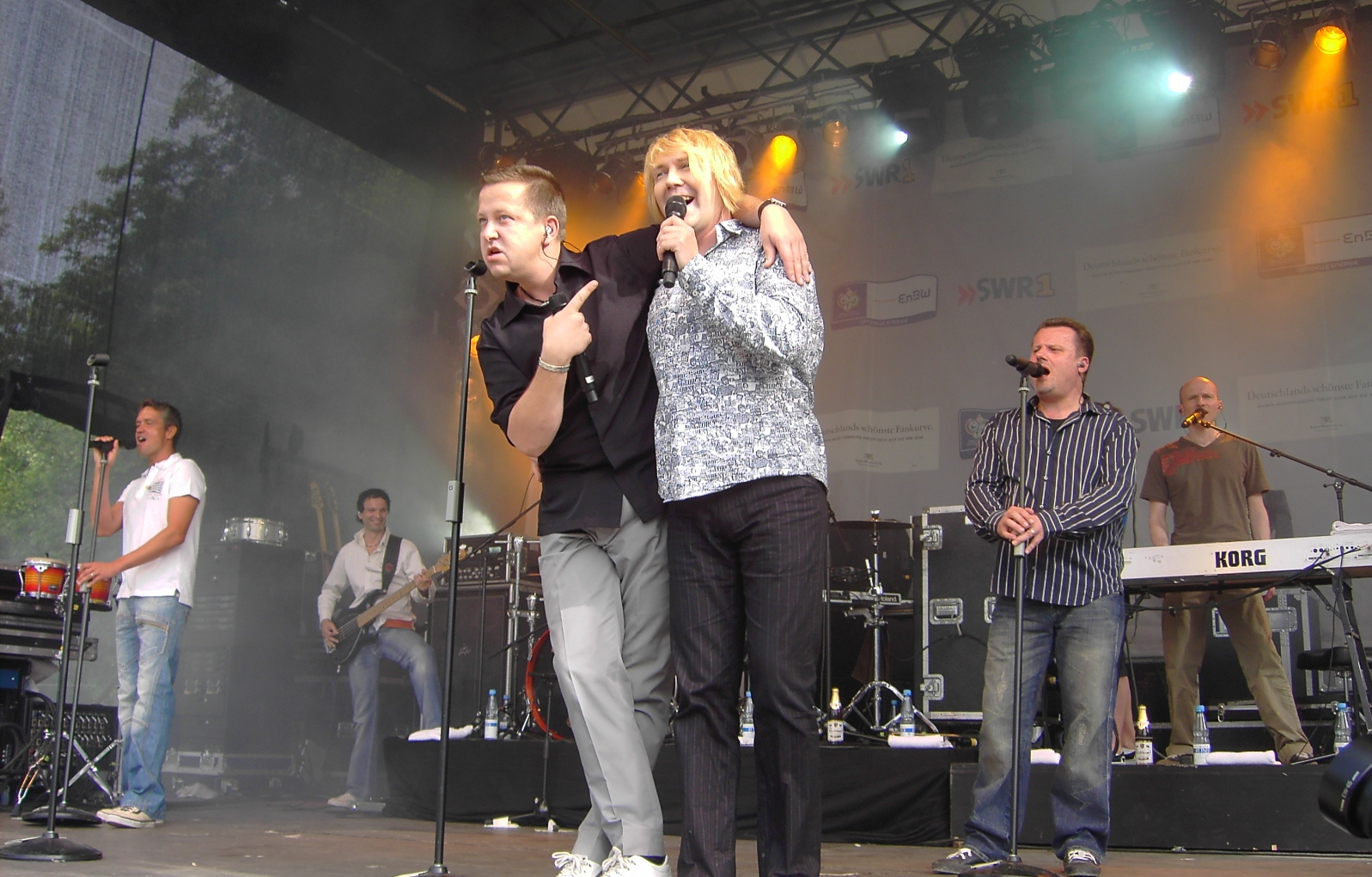
- Die Prinzen in 2006

Background information
- Origin: Leipzig, East Germany
- Genres: A cappella, pop rock
- Years active: 1987–2027
- Labels: Sony BMG, Ariola Express, Hansa
- Members: Sebastian Krumbiegel; Tobias Künzel; Wolfgang Lenk; Jens Sembdner; Henri Schmidt; Mathias Dietrich; Ali Zieme
- Website: dieprinzen.de (in German)

Die Prinzen ("The Princes") are a German pop rock band, consisting of former members of the Thomanerchor, and a former member of the Dresdner Kreuzchor.

== Overview ==
Early albums consist of a cappella music. The band's first name was Die Herzbuben, but it was changed to Die Prinzen in 1991 to avoid confusion with the Volkstümliche Schlager duo Wildecker Herzbuben. The lyrics of their songs are often humorous, tongue-in-cheek critiques of German government or society. The group's most popular singles have been "Alles nur geklaut", "Gabi und Klaus", "Millionär", "Küssen verboten", "(Du musst ein) Schwein sein", "Mein Fahrrad", "Olli Kahn" (about German World Cup goalkeeper Oliver Kahn) and "Deutschland".

In reference to the group's name and the Brothers Grimm fairy-tale "The Frog Prince", the group's logo is a green frog wearing a crown. The frog logo has appeared in a number of album and single covers.

Their hit song "Millionär" appeared in the accompanying video to the German textbooks "Komm mit", "Stationen", and "Kontakte".

"Deutschland" is a very cultural and ironic song about everything in Germany. It was written by German songwriter Steve van Velvet.

== Band members ==
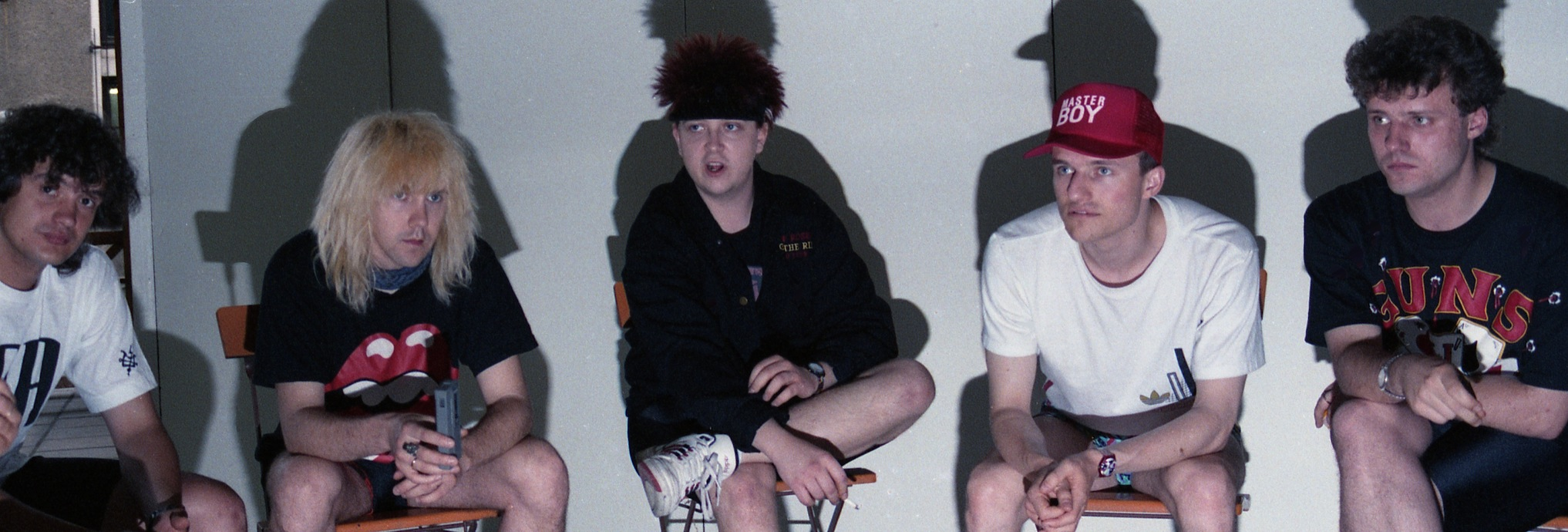
Die Prinzen in 1992

Die Prinzen

- Sebastian Krumbiegel (5 June 1966); vocals, keyboard
- Tobias Künzel (26 May 1964); vocals, guitar, keyboard
- Wolfgang Lenk (4 September 1966, Leipzig); vocals, keyboard, guitar
- Jens Sembdner (20 January 1967); vocals, keyboard
- Henri Schmidt (17 August 1967, Leipzig); vocals

Backing band

- Ali (Alexander) Zieme (23 March 1971, Leipzig); drums
- Mathias Dietrich (24 November 1964, Leipzig); bass

== Discography ==
=== Albums ===
- Das Leben ist grausam (1991)
- Das Leben ist grausam (a cappella)
- Küssen verboten (1992)
- Küssen verboten (a cappella)
- Alles nur geklaut (1993)
- Alles nur geklaut (a cappella)
- Schweine (1995)
- Alles mit'm Mund (1996)
- Ganz oben - Best of (1997)
- A-Cappella-Album (1997)
- So viel Spaß für wenig Geld (1999)
- So viel Spaß für wenig Geld (a cappella)
- Festplatte (1999)
- D (2001)
- Monarchie in Germany (2003)
- HardChor (2004)
- Akustisch live (2006)
- Die Prinzen Orchestral (2007)
- Die Neuen Männer (2008)
- Es war nicht alles schlecht (2010)
- Familienalbum (2015)
- Eine Nacht in der Oper (2015)
- Krone der Schöpfung (2021)

=== Videos ===
- VHS Das erste Video (1993)
- VHS Das Live Video (1994)
- DVD 10 Jahre Popmusik (2001)
- VHS 10 Jahre Popmusik (2001)
- DVD (two-disc) Akustisch live (2006)
- DVD Die Prinzen Orchestral (2007)

=== Singles ===
- Gabi und Klaus (1991)
- Millionär (1991)
- Mann im Mond (1992)
- Mein Fahrrad (1992)
- Küssen verboten (1992)
- Küssen verboten - Die Königlichen Remixe (1992)
- Bombe (1992)
- 1x (1993)
- Alles nur geklaut (1993)
- Überall (1994)
- Du spinnst doch (1994)
- (Du mußt ein) Schwein sein (1995)
- Ich will ein Baby (1995)
- Alles mit'm Mund (1996)
- Hose runter (1996)
- Heute ha-ha-habe ich Geburtstag (1997)
- Ganz oben (1997)
- Junimond (1998)
- So viel Spaß für wenig Geld (1999)
- Sie will mich (1999)
- Deutschland (2001)
- Hier sind wir (2001)
- Popmusik (2001)
- Olli Kahn (2002)
- Tiere sind zum Essen da (2003)
- Chronisch pleite (2003)
- Dürfen darf man alles (2021)
- Alles nur geklaut 2021 (2021)
- Krone der Schöpfung (2021)

== Charts ==
=== Singles ===
Year	Single	GER	AUT	SWI
1991	Gabi und Klaus	24	-	9
1991	Millionär	36	29	11
1992	Mann im Mond	30	-	-
1992	Mein Fahrrad	68	-	-
1992	Küssen verboten	17	-	-
1993	Alles nur geklaut	4	3	26
1994	Überall	63	-	-
1995	Du mußt ein Schwein sein	8	13	26
1996	Alles mit dem Mund	96	-	-
1997	Ganz oben (with the Thomanerchor)	82	-	-
1999	So viel Spaß für wenig Geld	68	-	-
2001	Deutschland	15	10	-
2002	Olli Kahn	32	-	-
2003	Chronisch pleite	56	-	-
2004	Unsicherheit macht sich breit	77	-	-

=== Albums ===
Year	Album	GER	AUT	SWI
1991	Das Leben ist grausam	5	39	20
1992	Küssen verboten	6	-	21
1993	Alles nur geklaut	4	2	13
1995	Schweine	3	6	22
1996	Alles mit'm Mund	25	-	-
1997	Ganz oben: Hits MCMXCI–MCMXCVII	23	-	-
1999	So viel Spaß für wenig Geld	9	-	-
1999	Festplatte	88	-	-
2001	D	13	50	-
2003	Monarchie in Germany	17	-	-
2004	Hardchor	61	-	-
2006	Akustisch Live	28	-	-
2008	Die neuen Männer	42	-	-
2009	Die neuen Männer Premium-Edition	-	-	-
2010	Es war nicht alles schlecht	69	-	-
2015	Familienalbum	9	52	52
2021	Krone der Schöpfung	2	10	16
