= Sebastian Krumbiegel =

German singer and musician (born 1966)

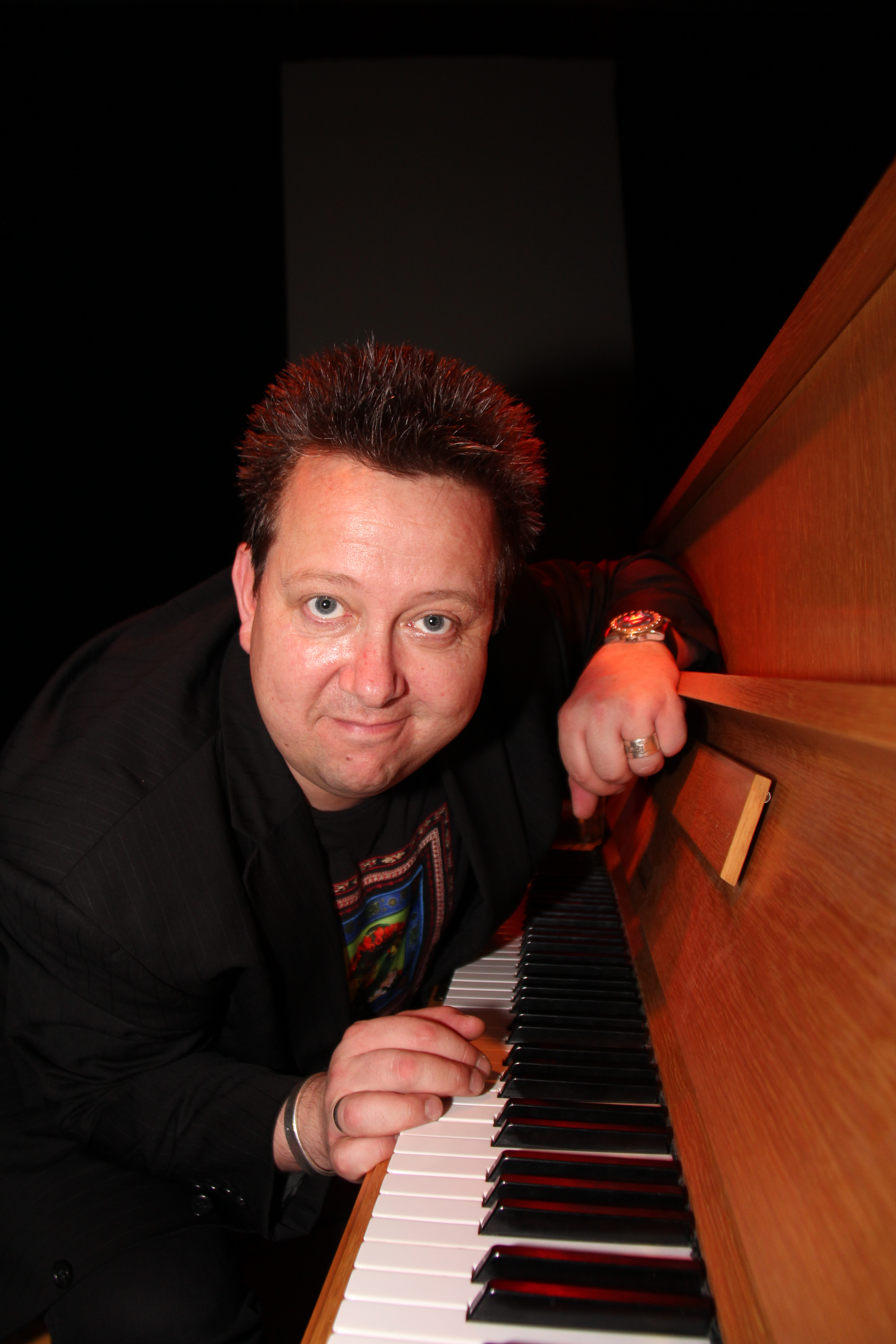
- Sebastian Krumbiegel in May 2012

Background information
- Born: Sebastian Krumbiegel; 5 June 1966 (age 60)
- Origin: Germany
- Genres: A cappella, rock, pop
- Years active: 1981–present
- Website: www.sebastiankrumbiegel.de

Sebastian Krumbiegel (born 5 June 1966) is a German singer and musician. He is a member of the band Die Prinzen.

Born in Leipzig, from 1976 to 1985 Krumbiegel attended the Thomasschule zu Leipzig where he took the Abitur examination in 1985. In 1981 he founded the rockband "Phoenix" together with his classmate Wolfgang Lenk.

Whilst serving in the NVA (1985–1987) Krumbiegel was the singer of the band "Rockpol". Between 1987 and 1991 Krumbiegel attended the University of Music and Theatre Leipzig. During this time he founded the band called "Die Herzbuben". Members were Wolfgang Lenk, Jens Sembdner and Henri Schmidt. Tobias Künzel joined the band in 1991. It was at this time that they changed the name of the band, calling themselves "Die Prinzen".

In 1998 Krumbiegel founded the "Club Geheimrat" and released his first solo CD called "Krumbiegel – Kamma mache nix". In 2004 Krumbiegel's second solo album "Geradeaus abgebogen" was released. In 2005 Krumbiegel played the part of Axel in the film "Max und Moritz Reloaded".

Krumbiegel is currently patron of the Ronald McDonald House in Leipzig. His brother is tenor and musicologist Martin Krumbiegel.
