= Favorite (rapper) =

German rapper

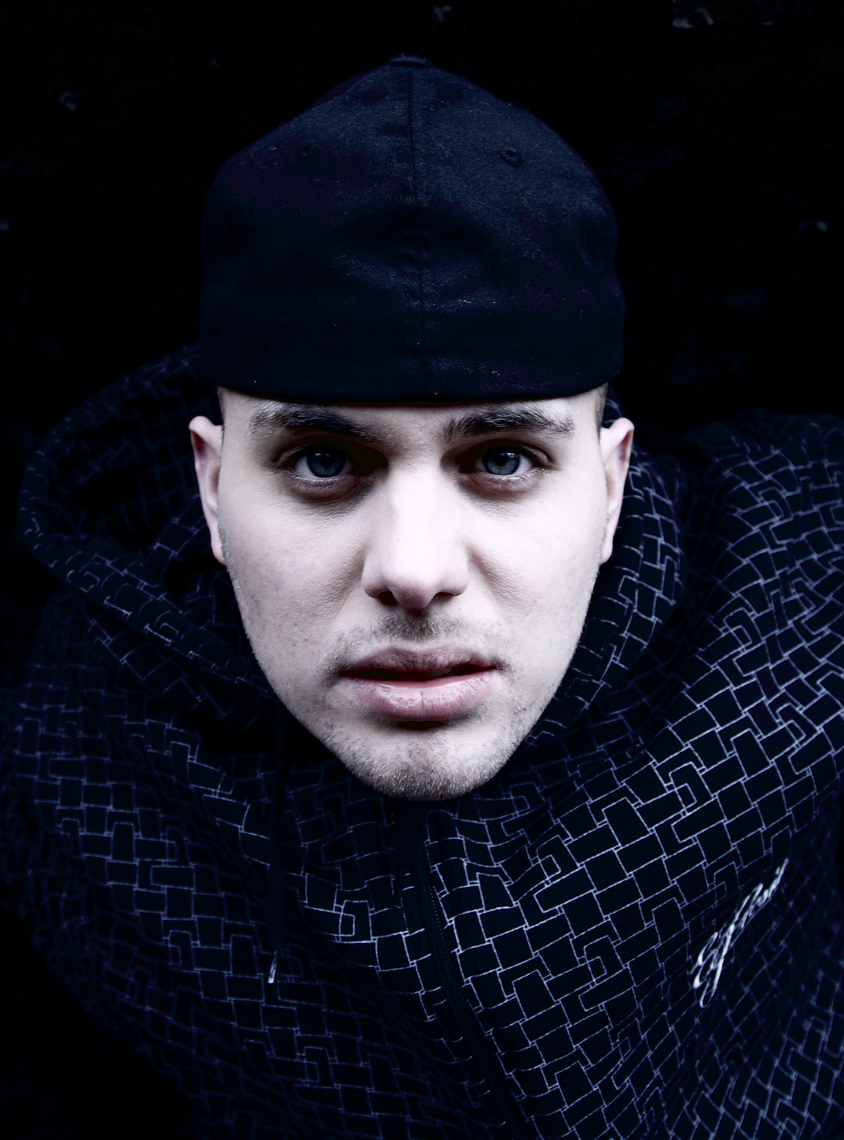
- Favorite in 2008

Background information
- Born: Christoph Alex; 18 February 1986 (age 40); Essen, West Germany
- Genres: Hip hop
- Occupations: Rapper, songwriter
- Years active: 2003–2020
- Label: Selfmade Records (2005)

Christoph Alex (born 18 February 1986), better known as Favorite, is a German rapper and songwriter. In 2011, his album Christoph Alex peaked at number 4 in the German charts.

== Biography ==
At age of 12, Favorite lost his parents in a fire and lived several years in different orphanages. The loss of his parents is a theme in many of Favorite's songs such as: "Gegen den Herrn" ("Against the lord") (released on Harlekin) and the single "Ich vermisse euch" ("I miss you").

== Discography ==
- 2007: Harlekin
- 2008: Anarcho
- 2011: Christoph Alex
- 2015: Neues von Gott
- 2017: Alternative für Deutschland
- 2025: Queenkiller
