= Silla (rapper) =

German rapper

- Also known as: Godsilla
- Born: Mathias Schulze; 5 May 1984 (age 42); Berlin, West Germany
- Genres: German rap
- Label: I Luv Money

Matthias Schulze (born 5 May 1984) better known as Silla (formerly Godsilla) is a German rapper who was previously signed to I Luv Money Records. In 2010, Schulze changed his pseudonym "Godsilla" to "Silla" to avoid a lawsuit by Toho, the owners of the rights to Godzilla.

== Biography ==
=== Musical career ===
2004 he released his first Solo album Übertalentiert. A year later he released an album with King Orgasmus One Schmutzige Euros. Releasing Massenhysterie in 2006 first music videos were shot. In 2007 a sequel to Schmutzige Euros followed. 2007 he met rapper Fler who was featured on his next album City of God. Equal to the track they named the collaboration album they released 2008 over Aggro Berlin. According to Silla he sold about 25.000 copies of his albums till 2007. In summer 2009 he had to be reanimated due to alcohol overdose. His next album Silla Instinkt came 2011, again over I Luv Money Records. Afterwards he signed to Fler's new label Maskulin and released Die Passion Whisky (2012) and Audio Anabolika (2014). 2015 he changed to the label Major Movez, released one album and two mixtaped until now.

== Discography ==
=== Solo ===
| Year | Title | Chart positions | | | Sales |
| Year | Title | GER | AUT | SWI | Sales |
|---|---|---|---|---|---|
| 2004 | Übertalentiert | | | | |
| 2006 | Massenhysterie | | | | |
| 2007 | Übertalentiert Premium Edition | | | | |
| 2007 | City of God | | | | |
| 2011 | Silla Instinkt | 30 (4 Wo.) | - | - | |
| 2012 | Wiederbelebt | 10 (2 Wo.) | - | - | |
| 2012 | Die Passion Whisky | 15 (1 Wo.) | - | - | |
| 2014 | Audio Anabolika | 12 (... Wo.) | 31 (... Wo.) | 23 (... Wo.) | |
| 2015 | Vom Alk zum Hulk | 5 (... Wo.) | 20 (... Wo.) | 4 (... Wo.) | |
| 2016 | Es war einmal in Südberlin | 21 (... Wo.) | 62 (... Wo.) | 55 (... Wo.) | |
| 2017 | Blockchef | 31 (... Wo.) | — | 77 (... Wo.) | |
| 2019 | Silla Instinkt 2 | 30 (... Wo.) | — | — | |
| 2021 | Unsterblich | 30 (... Wo.) | — | 97 (... Wo.) | |

=== Collaboration albums ===
| Year | Title | Chart positions | | | Sales |
| Year | Title | GER | AUT | SWI | Sales |
|---|---|---|---|---|---|
| 2005 | Schmutzige Euros (with King Orgasmus One) | | | | |
| 2007 | Schmutzige Euros 2 (with King Orgasmus One) | | | | |
| 2008 | Südberlin Maskulin | 22 (3 Wo.) | - | 81 (1 Wo.) | |

=== Free tracks ===
| Year | Title | Info(s) | Length |
|---|---|---|---|
| 2008 | "Guten Rutsch" | Bushido diss. Instrumental from: "Nie ein Rapper" by Bushido & Baba Saad; Wenn der Beat nicht mehr läuft" by Fler & Godsilla. | |
| 2009 | "Baby" (with Fler & Reason) | | |
| 2009 | "Früher wart ihr Fans" (with Fler & Kitty Kat) | Kollegah & Favorite diss. | |
