= Ersguterjunge albums discography =

German hip hop label

ersguterjunge discography
- Studio albums: 34
- EPs: 1
- Live albums: 4
- Compilation albums: 1

ersguterjunge is a German hip hop label founded by German rapper Bushido in 2004. The label has released 49 albums, including 34 studio albums.

== Albums ==
=== Studio albums ===
List of studio albums, with chart positions
Title	Artist	Album details	Peak chart positions				Certifications
Title	Artist	Album details	GER		AUT	SWI	Certifications
Title	Artist	Album details	Top 100	Hip hop	AUT	SWI	Certifications
Deutscha Playa	D-Bo	Released: 2004; Formats: CD, digital download	—	—	—	—	
Electro Ghetto	Bushido	Released: 25 October 2004; Formats: CD, digital download	6	—	81	63	BVMI: Gold
Deo Volente	D-Bo	Released: 2005; Formats: CD, digital download	—	—	—	—	
Rap braucht immer noch kein Abitur	Bass Sultan Hengzt	Released: 2005; Formats: CD, digital download	74	—	—	—	
Staatsfeind Nr. 1	Bushido	Released: 4 November 2005; Formats: CD, digital download	4	—	32	13	BVMI: Gold
Seelenblut	D-Bo	Released: 2006; Formats: CD, digital download	59	—	—	—	
Das Leben ist Saad	Baba Saad	Released: 16 June 2006; Formats: CD, digital download	15	—	—	39	
Von der Skyline zum Bordstein zurück	Bushido	Released: 4 September 2006; Formats: CD, digital download	2	—	3	15	BVMI: Gold; IFPI AUT: Gold
City Cobra	Chakuza	Released: 2 March 2007; Formats: CD, digital download	10	—	41	—	
Mukke aus der Unterschicht	Bizzy Montana	Released: 8 Juni 2007; Formats: CD, digital download	61	—	—	—	
7	Bushido	Released: 30 August 2007; Formats: CD, digital download	1	—	2	2	BVMI: Gold; IFPI AUT: Gold
Ekaveli	Eko Fresh	Released: 23 November 2007; Formats: CD, digital download	100	—	—	—	
Saadcore	Baba Saad	Released: 21 March 2018; Formats: CD, digital download	9	—	63	49	
Unter der Sonne	Chakuza	Released: 16 May 2018; Formats: CD, digital download	9	—	13	23	
Mukke aus der Unterschicht 2	Bizzy Montana	Released: 22 August 2008; Formats: CD, digital download	35	—	55	—	
Heavy Metal Payback	Bushido	Released: 10 October 2008; Formats: CD, digital download	1	—	2	2	BVMI: Gold; IFPI AUT: Gold
Hoffnung	Tarééc	Released: 2009; Formats: CD, digital download	—	—	—	—	
Mukke aus der Unterschicht 3	Bizzy Montana	Released: 24 July 2009; Formats: CD, digital download	45	—	—	—	
Amnezia	Nyze	Released: 7 August 2009; Formats: CD, digital download	67	—	—	—	
Zeiten ändern dich	Bushido	Released: 19 February 2010; Formats: CD, digital download	2	—	1	3	BVMI: Gold; IFPI AUT: Gold
Monster in mir	Chakuza	Released: 16 April 2010; Formats: CD, digital download	8	—	3	26	
Kenneth allein zu Haus	Kay One	Released: 7 May 2010; Formats: CD, digital download	7	—	12	43	
Flersguterjunge	Fler	Released: 11 June 2010; Formats: CD, digital download	4	—	8	12	
Jenseits von Gut und Böse	Bushido	Released: 13 May 2011; Formats: CD, digital download	1	—	1	1	
Prince of Belvedair	Kay One	Released: 16 March 2012; Formats: CD, digital download	4	—	4	7	
AMYF	Bushido	Released: 12 October 2012; Formats: CD, digital download	1	—	1	2	
NWA	Shindy	Released: 12 July 2013; Formats: CD, digital download	1	—	1	3	
NWA 2.0	Shindy	Released: 2 August 2013; Formats: CD, digital download	5	—	1	3	
Sonny Black	Bushido	Released: 14 February 2014; Formats: CD, digital download	1	—	1	1	BVMI: Gold; IFPI AUT: Gold; IFPI SWI: Gold
Fuck Bitches Get Money	Shindy	Released: 10 October 2014; Formats: CD, digital download	1	—	1	1	BVMI: Gold
Carlo Cokxxx Nutten 3	Bushido	Released: 13 February 2015; Formats: CD, digital download	1	2	1	1	BVMI: Gold; IFPI AUT: Gold
Fette Unterhaltung	Ali Bumaye	Released: 5 June 2015; Formats: CD, digital download	6	1	4	6	
Rumble in the Jungle	Ali Bumaye	Released: 3 June 2016; Formats: CD, digital download	4	2	3	4	
Dreams	Shindy	Released: 11 November 2016; Formats: CD, digital download	1	1	1	1	IFPI AUT: Gold
Black Friday	Bushido	Released: 9 June 2017; Formats: CD, digital download	1	1	1	1	BVMI: Gold
Mythos	Bushido	Released: 28 September 2018; Formats: CD, digital download	1	1	1	1	
Sonny Black II	Bushido	Released: 11 September 2021; Formats: CD, digital download	TBA				

=== Collaborative albums ===
List of collaborative albums, with chart positions
Title	Artist	Album details	Peak chart positions				Certifications
Title	Artist	Album details	GER		AUT	SWI	Certifications
Title	Artist	Album details	Top 100	Hip hop	AUT	SWI	Certifications
Carlo Cokxxx Nutten II	Bushido & Baba Saad	Released: 4 April 2005; Formats: CD, digital download	3	—	2	—	
Blackout	Chakuza & Bizzy Montana	Released: 6 October 2016; Formats: CD, digital download	69	—	—	—	
Carlo Cokxxx Nutten 2	Bushido & Fler	Released: 11 September 2009; Formats: CD, digital download	3	—	5	9	
Berlins Most Wanted	Berlins Most Wanted (Bushido, Fler & Kay One)	Released: 22 October 2010; Formats: CD, digital download	2	—	3	3	
23	23 (Bushido & Sido)	Released: 14 October 2011; Formats: CD, digital download	3	—	3	1	BVMI: Gold; IFPI AUT: Gold
CLA$$IC	Bushido & Shindy	Released: 6 November 2015; Formats: CD, digital download	1	1	1	1	BVMI: Gold; IFPI AUT: Gold
Carlo Cokxxx Nutten 4	Bushido & Animus	Released: 20 December 2019; Formats: CD, digital download	1	1	11	1	

=== Extended plays ===
List of extended plays
Title	Artist	Album details
Fickt euch alle	Capital Bra	Released: 28 September 2018; Formats: CD
Fick deine Mutter Slang	Bushido & Saad	Released: 11 September 2021; Formats: CD

=== Compilation albums ===
List of compilation albums, with chart positions
Title	Artist	Album details	Peak chart positions		
Title	Artist	Album details	GER	AUT	SWI
Das Beste	Bushido	Released: 9 November 2007; Formats: CD + DVD, digital download	27	30	68

=== Sampler albums ===
List of sampler albums, with chart positions
Title	Artists	Album details	Peak chart positions			Certifications
Title	Artists	Album details	GER	AUT	SWI	Certifications
Nemesis – ersguterjunge Sampler Vol. 1	Bushido, Baba Saad, Eko Fresh, Chakuza, D-Bo, DJ Stickle, Billy, Bizzy Montana, Nyze	Released: 17 February 2006; Formats: CD, digital download	5	26	64	
Vendetta – ersguterjunge Sampler Vol. 2	Bushido, Baba Saad, Eko Fresh, Chakuza, D-Bo, DJ Stickle, Bizzy Montana, Nyze, Summer Cem	Released: 1 December 2006; Formats: CD, digital download	7	20	84	BVMI: Gold
Alles Gute kommt von unten – ersguterjunge Sampler Vol. 3	Bushido, Baba Saad, Eko Fresh, Chakuza, D-Bo, DJ Stickle, Bizzy Montana, Nyze, Kay One	Released: 7 December 2007; Formats: CD, digital download	8	15	16	

=== Live albums ===
List of live albums, with chart positions
Title	Artist	Album details	Peak chart positions			Certifications
Title	Artist	Album details	GER	AUT	SWI	Certifications
Deutschland, gib mir ein Mic!	Bushido	Released: 28 April 2006; Formats: DVD + CD	10	37	68	BVMI: Gold
7 Live	Bushido	Released: 15 February 2008; Formats: DVD + CD	3	37	76	
Heavy Metal Payback Live	Bushido	Released: 9 January 2009; Formats: DVD + CD	5	47	—	
Zeiten ändern dich – Live durch Europa	Bushido	Released: 13 August 2010; Formats: DVD + CD	9	3	5	

=== Mixtapes ===
List of mixtapes, with chart positions
Title	Artist	Album details	Peak
Title	Artist	Album details	GER
Fick immer noch deine Story	Eko Fresh	Released: 16 December 2005; Format: CD	—
Suchen & Zerstören	Chakuza	Released: 15 April 2006; Format: CD	50

=== Demos ===
List of demos, with chart positions
Title	Artist	Album details	Peak
Title	Artist	Album details	GER
King of Kingz / Demotape	Bushido	Released: 25 October 2004; Format: CD, cassette	—
King of Kingz	Bushido	Released: 8 August 2005; Format: CD, cassette	55
