= Cassandra Steen discography =

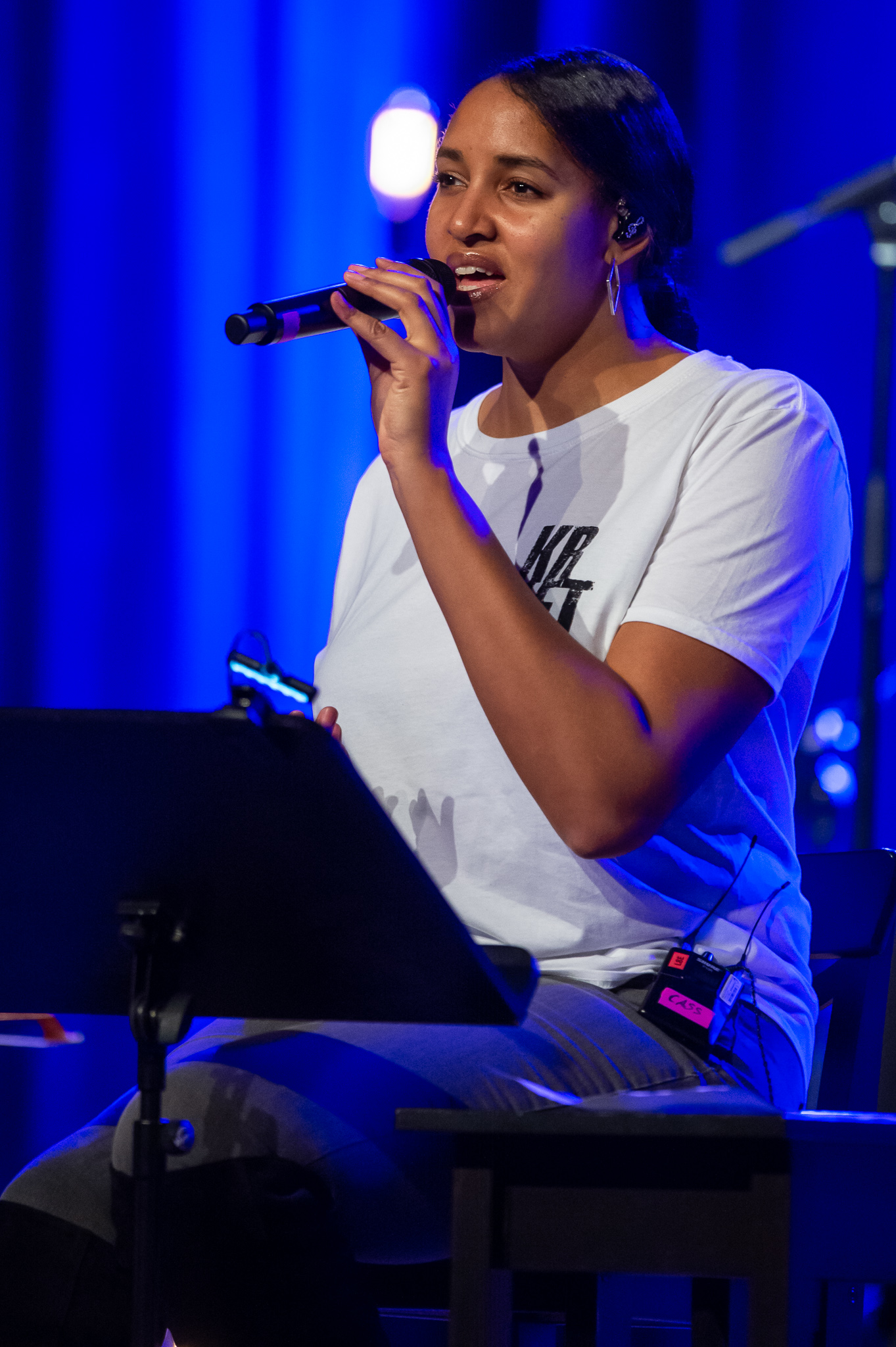
- Steen in 2019.
- Studio albums: 5

German recording artist Cassandra Steen has released five studio albums as a solo artist. Steen began her career as lead vocalist of pop trio Glashaus who released their self-titled debut album in 2001 and scored the top five hit "Wenn das Liebe ist" the same year. She released her first solo album, Seele mit Herz (2004), during the hiatus of the band on band member Moses Pelham's 3–P label. It reached the top sixty of the German Albums Chart and produced the singles "Wie du lachst" and "Alles was du willst", both of which failed to chart or sell noticeably.

After her departure from Glashaus, Steen signed a recording contract with Universal Urban and released her second album Darum leben wir in 2009. It entered the top ten in Germany and was eventually certified gold by the Bundesverband Musikindustrie (BVMI). Its singles "Darum leben wir" and "Stadt" both became top ten hits, the latter of which went platinum in Germany. Steen's third album Mir so nah (2011) debuted at number five on the German Albums Chart and produced the singles "Gebt alles" and "Tanz".

Her fourth record, Spiegelbild (2014), overseen by singer Tim Bendzko and musician Christian "Crada" Kalla, was less successful than its predecessors and peaked at number 42 on the German Albums Chart only. Its first and only single "Gewinner" failed to chart. Following the album's commercial failure, Steen rejoined Glashaus in 2016 but also continued performing and recording as a solo artist. In 2020, she released the Christmas album Der Weihnachtsgedanke through her own label SugarLoup Records.

== Albums ==
=== Studio albums ===
List of albums, with selected chart positions, sales figures and certifications
Title	Album details	Peak chart positions			Certifications
Title	Album details	GER	AUT	SWI	Certifications
Seele mit Herz	Released: 28 August 2004; Label: 3p; Formats: CD	59	—	—	
Darum leben wir	Released: 10 February 2009; Label: Universal Urban; Formats: CD, digital download	10	65	—	GER: Gold
Mir so nah	Released: 29 April 2011; Label: Universal Urban; Formats: CD, digital download	5	47	44	
Spiegelbild	Released: 3 October 2014; Label: Universal Urban; Formats: CD, digital download	42	—	—	
Der Weihnachtsgedanke	Released: 20 November 2020; Label: Sugarloup; Formats: CD, digital download	—	—	—	
"—" denotes items which were not released in that country or failed to chart.

== Singles ==
=== As a main artist ===
List of singles, with selected chart positions and certifications, showing year released and album name
Title	Year	Peak chart positions			Certifications	Album
Title	Year	GER	AUT	SWI	Certifications	Album
"Wie du lachst"	2004	—	—	—		Seele mit Herz
"Darum leben wir"	2009	6	48	—		Darum leben wir
"Stadt" (featuring Adel Tawil)	2009	2	3	31	GER: Platinum	Darum leben wir
"Glaub ihnen kein Wort"	2009	49	—	—		Darum leben wir
"Gebt alles"	2011	31	—	—		Mir so nah
"Tanz"	2011	28	30	—		Mir so nah
"Soo"	2011	—	—	—		Mir so nah
"Gewinnen"	2014	—	—	—		Spiegelbild
"Ich lauf" (with Fahrenhaidt & Vincent Malin)	2016	—	—	—		Non-album singles
"Der Weihnachtsgedanke"	2019	—	—	—		Der Weihnachtsgedanke
"Das Neujahrslied"	2019	—	—	—		Der Weihnachtsgedanke
"Wundervoll geheimnisvoll"	2020	—	—	—		Non-album singles
"Gemeinsam" (with Monrath)	2020	—	—	—		Non-album singles
"Wenn es Winter wird"	2020	—	—	—		Der Weihnachtsgedanke
"Wo du bist" (with Manuellsen)	2022	—	—	—		Non-album singles
"All I Want for Christmas Is Me"	2022	—	—	—		Non-album singles
"Lächeln" (with Florian Künstler)	2023	—	—	—		Non-album singles

=== As a featured artist ===
List of singles, with selected chart positions and certifications, showing year released and album name
Title	Year	Peak chart positions			Certifications	Album
Title	Year	GER	AUT	SWI	Certifications	Album
"Alles was du willst" (Illmatic featuring Cassandra Steen)	2004	81	—	—		Officillz Bootleg — Der junge Illz
"Hoffnung stirbt zuletzt" (Bushido featuring Cassandra Steen)	2005	29	—	—		Electro Ghetto
"Eines Tages" (Azad featuring Cassandra Steen)	2006	28	—	—		Game Over
"Ich trage dich" (with Zeichen der Zeit)	2006	56	—	—		David Generation
"Wann" (Xavier Naidoo featuring Cassandra Steen)	2008	35	39	—		MTV Unplugged
"Never Knew I Needed" (Ne-Yo featuring Cassandra Steen)	2009	64	—	—		The Princess and the Frog O.S.T.
"Frag nie warum" (with Yvonne Catterfeld)	2010	—	—	—		Blau im Blau
"Bitte hör nicht auf zu träumen" (with Xavier Naidoo & Naturally 7)	2010	22	71	49		Alles kann besser werden — Live
"Pflaster" (with Ich + Ich, Gentleman & Till Brönner)	2010	—	—	—		non-album release
"Liebe ist einfach" (with Tiziano Ferro)	2012	—	—	—		L'amore è una cosa semplice
"Unter die Haut" (Tim Bendzko featuring Cassandra Steen)	2013	16	49	59		Unter die Haut
"Eine Sprache" (Parallel featuring Cassandra Steen)	2018	—	—	—		Bühnen aus Asphalt

== Album appearances ==
Song	Year	Artist(s)	Album
"Cassandra & Christina"	1997	Freundeskreis	Quadratur des Kreises
"Telefonterror"	1997	Freundeskreis	Quadratur des Kreises
"Wenn der Vorhang fällt"	1997	Freundeskreis, Wasi, Sékou	Quadratur des Kreises
"Solange"	2000	—N/a	Evolution (Rödelheim 2000–2001)
"Fragezeichen"	2002	J-Luv	Kontraste
"An alle"	2004	Illmat!c, Moses Pelham, Franziska	Officillz Bootleg - Der Junge Illz
"Mehr von dir"	2004	Melbeatz, Curse	Rappers Delight
"All of Us"	2005	Sékou	Am I My Brother’s Keeper?
"Bis wir uns wiedersehen"	2005	Bushido	Staatsfeind Nr. 1
"I Can’t Tell You Why"	2006	Charles Simmons	State of Mind Vol. 2
"Eines Tages"	2006	Azad	Game Over
"Du bleibst mir"	2006	Ischen Impossible	The Mischen
"Zeit zurückdrehen"	2006	UnterWortverdacht	Aufstand der Aufrechten
"The Living Daylights"	2006	Mister Bond	A Jazzy Cocktail of Ice Cold Themes
"Wahre Liebe"	2006	N/A	Romeo & Julia
"Keine Zweifel"	2007	Snaga & Pillath	Aus Liebe zum Spiel
"Halt Fest"	2008	Ercandize	Best of Ercandize Vol. 2 - I Am Legend
"Will nur wissen"	2008	Bernstein	Lichtwärts
"Bonnie & Clyde"	2008	Bushido	Heavy Metal Payback
"Alle Männer müssen kämpfen"	2008	Xavier Naidoo	MTV Unplugged
"Sie Leiden"	2009	Tone	Phantom
"Wenn Liebe nicht mehr reicht"	2009	Danny Fresh, Olli Banjo	Deutschlands Vergessene Kinder 2
"Sie, ich & sie"	2009	Afrob	Der Letzte seiner Art
"Wahrheit"	2009	Hassan Annouri	International
"Du bist Vergangenheit"	2009	Kitty Kat	Miyo!
"Du bist nicht mehr Du"	2009	Emily Fröhlich	Deine Song 2009
"Frag nie warum"	2009	Yvonne Catterfeld	Blau
"Thinking About You"	2010	Gentleman	Diversity
"Stell dir diese Welt vor"	2010	Matteo Capreoli	Ein Stück vom Weg
"Wann"	2010	Xavier Naidoo	Alles kann besser werden - live
"Stadt"	2010	Ich + Ich	Gute Reise - Live aus Berlin
"Scheiß auf dein tut mir Leid"	2010	Kay One	unknown
"License to Kill"	2010	—N/a	James Bond in Jazzy Lounge
"The Living Daylights"	2010	—N/a	James Bond in Jazzy Lounge
"Eine Frage der Zeit"	2011	Cutheta, Oneway	Kopfnoten
"Liebe ist einfach"	2011	Tiziano Ferro	L'amore è una cosa semplice
"My Baby Just Cares for Me"	2011	—N/a	Die Ultimative Chart-Show
"Angel"	2012	Lionel Richie	Tuskegee
"Der erste Winter"	2012	Silla	Die Passion Whisky
"Me and Mrs. Jones"	2012	Max Mutzke	Durch Einander
"Ich geh mit meiner Laterne"	2013	—N/a	Giraffenaffen 2
"Unter die Haut"	2013	Tim Bendzko	Am seidenen Faden – Unter die Haut
"Be Our Guest"	2014	—N/a	I Love Disney
"Shades and Shadows"	2014	Vincent Ott	Dein Song 2014
"Goldene Zeiten"	2015	Unheilig	Unter Dampf – Ohne Strom
"Geboren um zu Leben"	2015	Unheilig	Unter Dampf – Ohne Strom
"Bessere Tage"	2015	—N/a	Herzberührt – Deutsche Poeten
"Am Weihnachtsbaum die Lichter brennen"	2016	DFB, Bernd Ruf	Ein Wintermärchen – Weihnachtslieder aus Deutschland
"Ich Lauf"	2016	Fahrenhaidt, Vincent Malin	Herzberührt – Deutsche Poeten 2
"Ich geh mit meiner Laterne"	2019	—N/a	Die Giraffenaffen-Box
"Alles auf Hoffnung"	2020	Gil Ofarim	Alles auf Hoffnung

== Music videos ==
Year	Title	Director
2003	"Wie du lachst"	Daniel Lwowski
2003	"Alles was du willst"	Katja Kuhl
2005	"Hoffnung stirbt zuletzt"	Hinrich Pflug
2006	"Eines Tages"	Hinrich Pflug
2009	"Darum leben wir"	Deborah Schamoni, Olaf Heine
2009	"Stadt"	Hinrich Pflug
2009	"Glaub ihnen kein Wortt"	Miriam Dehne
2009	"Never Knew I Needed"	John Musker, Ron Clements
2011	"Gebt alles"	Daniel Harder
