= Kay One discography =

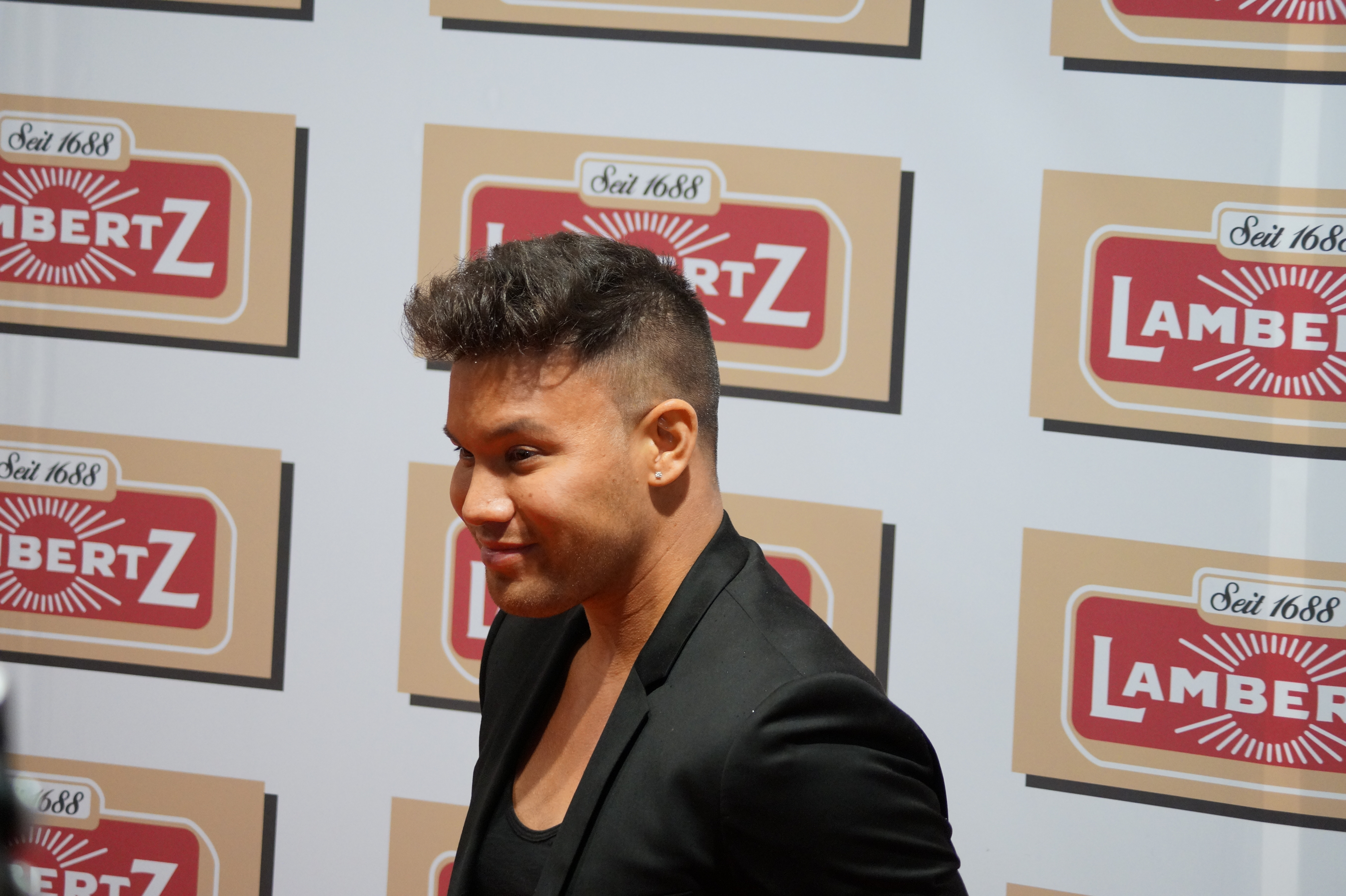
Kay One at Lambertz Monday Night in 2015

The discography of Kay One, a rapper from Ravensburg, Germany, also known as "Prince Kay One".

== Studio albums ==
| Year | Title | Credited as | Chart positions | | | Sales |
| Year | Title | Credited as | GER | AUT | SWI | Sales |
|---|---|---|---|---|---|---|
| 2010 | Kenneth allein zu Haus: Released: 7 May 2010; Label: ersguterjunge; Formats: CD, digital download | Kay One | 7 | 12 | 43 | |
| 2012 | Prince of Belvedair: Released: 2 March 2012; Label: ersguterjunge; Formats: CD, digital download | Kay One | 4 | 7 | 7 | |
| 2013 | Rich Kidz: Released: 25 October 2013; Label: AP Allstars (Embassy of Music); Formats: CD, digital download | Prince Kay One | 1 | 3 | 5 | |
| 2015 | JGUDZS – Jung genug um drauf zu scheissen: Released: 19 June 2015; Label: Prince Kay One GmbH; Formats: CD, digital download | Kay One | 4 | 2 | 1 | |
| 2016 | Der Junge von damals: Released: 2 September 2016; Label: Prince Kay One GmbH; Formats: CD, digital download | Kay One | 3 | 2 | 6 | |
| 2018 | Makers Gonna Make: Released: 7 September 2018; Label: Prince Kay One GmbH; Formats: CD, digital download | Kay One | 4 | 6 | 13 | |

== Collaboration albums ==
| Year | Title | Credited as | Chart positions | | | Sales |
| Year | Title | Credited as | GER | AUT | SWI | Sales |
|---|---|---|---|---|---|---|
| 2010 | Berlins Most Wanted (with Berlins Most Wanted): Released: 22 October 2010; Label: ersguterjunge; Formats: CD | Kay One | 2 | 3 | 3 | |

== Singles ==
=== As lead artist ===
| Year | Title | Credited as | Chart positions | | | Album |
| Year | Title | Credited as | GER | AUT | SWI | Album |
|---|---|---|---|---|---|---|
| 2010 | "Style & das Geld" (featuring Bushido) | Kay One | — | — | — | Kenneth allein zu Haus |
| 2010 | "Ich brech die Herzen" | Kay One | 67 | — | — | Kenneth allein zu Haus |
| 2012 | "I Need a Girl (Part Three)" (featuring Mario Winans) | Kay One | 29 | 44 | 39 | Prince of Belvedair |
| 2012 | "Finale wir kommen" (featuring Shindy) | Kay One | 29 | — | — | Non-album single |
| 2013 | "V.I.P." (featuring The Product G&B) | Prince Kay One | 4 | 9 | 10 | Rich Kidz |
| 2013 | "Belstaff" (featuring Kns Tha Engineer) | Prince Kay One | 96 | 50 | — | Rich Kidz |
| 2013 | "Rich Kidz" (featuring Juh-Dee) | Prince Kay One | 98 | 33 | — | Rich Kidz |
| 2013 | "Keep Calm (Fuck U)" (featuring Emory) | Prince Kay One | 11 | 15 | 30 | Rich Kidz |
| 2013 | "Helal Money" (featuring Farid Bang) | Prince Kay One | 71 | — | — | Rich Kidz |
| 2013 | "Ich hass es dich zu lieben" (featuring Emory) | Prince Kay One | 52 | — | — | Rich Kidz |
| 2013 | "Pushen" | Prince Kay One | 96 | — | — | Rich Kidz |
| 2014 | "United" (featuring Patrick Miller) | Prince Kay One | 14 | 33 | 19 | Non-album singles |
| 2014 | "Beautiful" (featuring Victoria Swarovski) | Prince Kay One | 36 | 42 | 64 | Non-album singles |
| 2015 | "AMG" (featuring Al-Gear) | Kay One | 54 | 50 | — | JGUDZS – Jung genug um drauf zu scheissen |
| 2016 | "Believe" (featuring Faydee) | Kay One | — | — | — | Der Junge von damals |
| 2017 | "Louis Louis" | Kay One | 9 | 16 | 58 | Makers Gonna Make |
| 2017 | "Señorita" (featuring Pietro Lombardi) | Kay One | 1 | 1 | 7 | Makers Gonna Make |
| 2018 | "Number One" (with Massari featuring Tory Lanez) | Kay One | 81 | — | — | Makers Gonna Make |
| 2018 | "Netflix & Chill" (featuring Mike Singer) | Kay One | 11 | 15 | 54 | Makers Gonna Make |
| 2018 | "Es tut mir leid" | Kay One | 52 | 50 | 92 | Makers Gonna Make |
| 2019 | "Bentley" | Kay One | 24 | 43 | 82 | Non-album singles |
| 2019 | "Portofino" (with Leon Machère featuring Tilly) | Kay One | 18 | 25 | 68 | Non-album singles |
| 2019 | "FMK" | Kay One | — | — | — | Non-album singles |
| 2020 | "Bachata" (featuring Cristobal) | Kay One | 40 | — | 81 | Non-album singles |

=== Collaboration singles ===
| Year | Title | Chart positions | | Album |
| Year | Title | GER | AUT | Album |
|---|---|---|---|---|
| 2007 | "Alles Gute kommt von unten" (with Bushido & Chakuza) | 57 | 68 | Alles Gute kommt von unten – ersguterjunge Sampler Vol. 3 |
| 2010 | "Fackeln im Wind" (with Bushido) | 6 | 52 | Non-album single |
| 2010 | "Berlins Most Wanted" (with Berlins Most Wanted) | 31 | 57 | Berlins Most Wanted |

=== As featured performer ===
| Year | Title | Chart positions | | Album |
| Year | Title | GER | AUT | Album |
|---|---|---|---|---|
| 2011 | "Das ist Business" (Bushido featuring Kay One) | — | 60 | Jenseits von Gut und Böse |

== Free tracks ==
| Year | Title | Notes |
|---|---|---|
| 2006 | "Wir werden Stars" ("We become stars") | |
| 2007 | "MySpace Exklusiv" (featuring Adrenalin) | |
| 2008 | "Der Coole von der Schule" ("The cool one of the school") | Instrumental from "Crunk Muzik" by Jim Jones featuring Cam'ron & Juelz Santana |
| 2008 | "Flügel" ("Wings") (featuring Ossama of 2 Generationen) | |
| 2008 | "Dieses Lied" ("This song") (featuring K-Seyf & Dudi) | Instrumental from "N 10" by Booba |
| 2008 | "Zu zweit und doch allein" ("In pairs and still alone") (featuring Tarééc) | |
| 2008 | "S.I.D.O." (with Bushido) | Sido diss track |
| 2009 | "Live2Live" | Sido & Alpa Gun diss track; Instrumental from "Go To Sleep" by Eminem, Obie Trice & DMX |
| 2009 | "Durch die Nacht" ("Through the night") (featuring Dudi & Mandy Capristo) | |
| 2009 | "Karussell" ("Carousel") (featuring Nyze) | |
| 2009 | "Sound für den Sommer" ("The sound for the summer") (featuring Benny Blanko & SK Ekrem) | |
| 2009 | "Allein" ("Alone") (featuring AndyR, BlackLife & Dudi) | |
| 2010 | "Fick die Polizei" ("Fuck the police") (featuring SK Ekrem, Cahit, S-Keyp, Blacklife & K-Seyf) | |
| 2012 | "Champagne for the Pain" (featuring Emory) | |
| 2013 | "Gianni Versace" (featuring Kns Tha Engineer) | |
| 2013 | "Nichts als die Wahrheit" | Bushido diss track |
