= Hart(z) IV =

Studio album by Eko Fresh
- Released: 2006
- Genre: Hip hop
- Label: ersguterjunge

Eko Fresh chronology
Elektro Eko: Fick immer noch deine Story Mixtape (2005)	Hart(z) IV (2006)	Ekaveli (2007)

Hart(z) IV is the second album by German-Turkish rapper Eko Fresh. The album features artists from his label, German Dream Entertainment and as well Baba Saad, Bushido, Kay One and Billy from ersguterjunge.

Eko Fresh who had signed onto ersguterjunge, released there his album.

== Tracks listing ==
1. "Intro"
2. "Ruhe Vor Dem Sturm" ("Silence before the storm") (featuring Antigaranti)
3. "Der Don 2"
4. "Hartz IV"
5. "Gheddo" (featuring Bushido)
6. "Kings of Cologne" (featuring SD)
7. "Darauf Kannst Du Gift Nehmen" ("You can bet on this")
8. "Was Kann Ich Dafür" ("What Can I Do?")
9. "Bazen" (featuring Killa Hakan, Ayas Kapli)
10. "Ek Is Back" (featuring G-Style)
11. "Stenz Gang" (featuring Hakan Abi, Kingsize, Summer Cem)
12. "Fackeln Im Sturm" ("Torches in the storm")
13. "Wir Sind Soldier, Homie" ("We are soldiers, homie") (featuring Kay One)
14. "Westside" (featuring La-Honda)
15. "Noch Einmal" ("One more time") (featuring Billy)
16. "Skit"
17. "Ihr Werdet Uns Nicht Los" ("You won't get rid of us") (featuring Saad)
18. "Der Rest Ist Geschichte" ("The rest is history")
19. "Das Ist Mein Viertel" ("Thats my Turf") (featuring Capkekz)
20. "Bitanem (meine Türkische Freundin)" ("My Turkish girlfriend")
21. "Türkenpimmel" ("Turk dick")
22. "Outro"
