= Spiegelbild (album) =

Studio album by Cassandra Steen
- Released: 3 October 2014
- Length: 43:52
- Labels: Polydor; Island
- Producer: Christian "Crada" Kalla

Cassandra Steen chronology
Mir so nah (2011)	Spiegelbild (2014)	Der Weihnachtsgedanke (2020)

Spiegelbild (English: Reflection) is the fourth studio album by German recording artist Cassandra Steen. It was released by Polydor and Island Records on 3 October 2014 in German-speaking Europe. Songwriting and co-production on the album was overseen by singer Tim Bendzko with whom Steen had previously collaborated on their 2013 single "Unter die Haut", while music production on most tracks was helmed by Christian "Crada" Kalla. Spiegelbild debuted and peaked at number 42 on the German Albums Chart.

== Critical reception ==
Professional ratings
Review scores
Source	Rating
laut.de	1/5 stars

laut.de editor Sven Kabelitz rated the album one out of five stars. He found that "with her fourth solo album Spiegelbild, Cassandra Steen presents herself closer to Helene Fischer than to Mary J. Blige [...] Greasy pop-soul junk with texts and emotions copied from sentimental Diddl postcards from the discount store display [...] Spiegelbild treats music not as an art form, but as a well-calculated product. You won't find any real emotions or even stories."

== Track listing ==
Spiegelbild track listing
No.	Title	Writer(s)	Length
1.	"Bleibt alles gleich"	Christian Kalla; Tim Bendzko	4:05
2.	"Bessere Tage" (featuring Tim Bendzko)	Kalla; Bendzko	3:49
3.	"Blind"	Kalla; Bendzko	2:38
4.	"Gewinnen"	Kalla; Bendzko	3:35
5.	"Zu kalt"	Kalla; Bendzko	4:01
6.	"Weil ich auf der Suche bin"	Steen; Kalla; Bendzko	3:38
7.	"Neubeginn"	Kalla; Bendzko	3:40
8.	"Du weisst das"	Steen; Kalla; Bendzko	4:16
9.	"Spiegelbild"	Steen; Kalla; Bendzko	3:47
10.	"Glück"	Kalla; Bendzko; Michael Vajna	3:34
11.	"Nein"	Steen; Kalla; Bendzko; Daniel Russ	3:18
12.	"Vergessen"	Kalla; Bendzko	3:58
Total length:			43:52

Special edition
No.	Title	Length
13.	"Immer noch"	3:37
14.	"Zurück" (featuring Moses Pelham)	5:10

== Charts ==
Weekly chart performance for Spiegelbild
Chart (2014)	Peak position
German Albums (Offizielle Top 100)	42

== Release history ==
Spiegelbild release history
Region	Date	Format(s)	Label
Various	October 2014	Digital download; CD	Polydor; Island
