= Staatsfeind Nr. 1 =

German rap album

Studio album by Bushido
- Released: 4 November 2005
- Genre: German hip hop
- Length: 65:46
- Label: ersguterjunge
- Producers: Beatlefield, Bushido, Sti, Decay, Kingsize, Rizbo

Bushido chronology
Carlo Cokxxx Nutten II (2005)	Staatsfeind Nr. 1 (2005)	Von der Skyline zum Bordstein zurück (2006)

Singles from Staatsfeind Nr. 1
- 1. "Endgegner/Staatsfeind Nr.1" Released: 21 October 2005; 2. "Augenblick" Released: 23 December 2005

Professional ratings
Review scores
Source	Rating
AllMusic	3.5/5 stars
laut.de	3/5 stars

Staatsfeind Nr. 1 ("Public Enemy No. 1") is the third solo album by German rapper Bushido, released 4 November 2005 via ersguterjunge. Features include Baba Saad, D-Bo, Chakuza, Billy13, Eko Fresh, Godsilla, and J.R. Writer. The album received gold status in Germany for more than 100,000 units sold. Two singles were released, "Endgegner" and "Augenblick".

== Track listing ==
No.	Title	Producer(s)	Length
1.	"Intro"	Beatlefield	1:30
2.	"Waffendealer" (Arms dealer)	Sti	3:15
3.	"Der Sandmann" (The sandmann) (featuring Chakuza & Baba Saad)	Beatlefield	3:55
4.	"Die Stimme der Nation" (The voice of the nation) (featuring Godsilla)	Decay	3:02
5.	"Untergrund" (Underground) (featuring Eko Fresh)	Beatlefield	4:10
6.	"Engel" (Angel)	Bushido	3:19
7.	"Ab 18" (X-rated) (featuring Saad)	Beatlefield	3:54
8.	"Das Leben ist hart" (Life is tough)	Beatlefield	4:17
9.	"Staatsfeind Nr. 1" (Public Enemy No. 1)	Beatlefield	4:18
10.	"Sieh in meine Augen" (Look me in the eyes) (featuring D-Bo)	Beatlefield	4:19
11.	"Harter Brocken" (A tough nut to crack) (featuring J.R. Writer)	Kingsize	3:31
12.	"Hymne der Strasse" (Hymn of the streets) (featuring Saad)	Beatlefield	3:44
13.	"Augenblick" (Moment)	Sti	4:02
14.	"Endgegner" (Endboss)	Rizbo	3:42
15.	"Bis wir uns wiedersehen" (Until we meet again) (featuring Cassandra Steen)	Beatlefield	3:12
16.	"Wir regieren Deutschland" (We rule Germany) (featuring Billy13 & Saad)	Decay	3:40
17.	"Mein Leben lang" (My lifelong) (featuring Chakuza)	Beatlefield	4:03
18.	"Der Bösewicht" (The bad guy) (Saad featuring Bushido)	Beatlefield	3:08
19.	"Outro"	Beatlefield	1:30

Samples

- "Engel" contains a sample of "Alt Lys Er Svunnet Hen" by Dimmu Borgir
- "Ab 18" features an interpolation of "Only U" by Ashanti
- "Staatsfeind Nr. 1" contains a sample of "Dirty Diana" by Michael Jackson
- "Sieh in meine Augen" contains a sample of "Part of Me" by Lara Fabian
- "Bis wir uns wiedersehen" contains a sample of "Fade to Black" by Apocalyptica which is a cover of "Fade to Black" by Metallica
- "Mein Leben lang" contains a sample of "A Piece of the Action" by The Babys
- "Der Bösewicht" contains a sample of "Welcome Me Love" by The Brooklyn Bridge
- "Outro" contains a sample of "Diamonds and Rust" by Joan Baez
