= Seele mit Herz =

Studio album by Cassandra Steen
- Released: August 4, 2003
- Length: 60:23
- Label: 3p
- Producer: JC-Mjusix; Nachtwandler; Nene; Thomas Ruffner; Cassandra Steen

Cassandra Steen chronology
Seele mit Herz (2003)	Darum leben wir (2009)

Singles from Seele mit Herz
- 1. "Wie du lachst" Released: 14 July 2003

Seele mit Herz (English: Soul with Heart) is the debut solo album by German singer Cassandra Steen. It was released by 3p on 4 August 2003 in German-speaking Europe. Recorded within a hiatus of her former group Glashaus, Steen worked with producers JC-Mjusix, Nachtwandler, Nene, and Thomas Ruffner on the bulk of the album that combined rhythm and blues with soul pop music. Label mates Moses Pelham and Illmatic as well as rappers Eko Fresh, Azad and Kool Savas appear as guest vocalist on the album.

== Critical reception ==
Professional ratings
Review scores
Source	Rating
laut.de	3/5 stars

laut.de editor Alexander Engelen rated the album three out of five stars. He found that "even though Cassandra's voice clearly dominates the album, the sometimes sad, sometimes amorous lyrics and the calm, sensitive music create a fitting unity. You won't find any dance hits, upcheering tracks or classics on Seele mit Herz. But for a successful romantic evening it is enough that Cassandra Steen takes the listener on a journey through her heart and soul."

== Track listing ==
Seele mit Herz track listing
No.	Title	Writer(s)	Producer(s)	Length
1.	"Inspiration (Intro)"			2:17
2.	"Wie du lachst"	Steen; Cihan Bulut; Jochen Weiss	JC-Mjusix	4:24
3.	"Nichts hält mich" (featuring Azad & Kool Savas)	Steen; Azad Azadpour; Jens Klingelhöfer; Christoph Riebling; Patrick Ruhrmann; Savas Yurderi	Nachtwandler	3:45
4.	"Geht es dir besser so?"	Riebling; Ruhrmann; Klingelhöfer	Nachtwandler	6:12
5.	"Gestern und heute (Skit)"			0:19
6.	"Das Schicksal" (featuring Eko Fresh)	Steen; Ekrem Bora; Riebling; Ruhrmann; Klingelhöfer	Nachtwandler	3:50
7.	"Soul (Skit)"			0:44
8.	"Seele mit Herz"	J. Williams I; Riebling; Ruhrmann; Klingelhöfer	Nachtwandler	4:50
9.	"Unter null"	Riebling; Ruhrmann; Klingelhöfer	Nachtwandler	4:32
10.	"Illa (Skit)"			1:10
11.	"Alles was du willst (Part 2)" (with Illmatic)			5:06
12.	"Was tut dir gut" (featuring Moses Pelham)	Pelham; Williams; Riebling; Ruhrmann; Klingelhöfer	Nachtwandler	5:16
13.	"Lied für dich"	Williams; José A. Alcauce	Nene	4:11
14.	"Warum rufst du mich an?"	Riebling; Ruhrmann; Klingelhöfer	Nachtwandler	4:43
15.	"Du bist Liebe"	Steen; Thomas Ruffner; Alcauce	Steen; Ruffner; Nene	4:42
16.	"Intorno all'idol mio"	Steen; Yiruma; Antonio Cesti; Riebling; Ruhrmann; Klingelhöfer	Nachtwandler	3:09
Total length:				60:23

== Charts ==
Weekly chart performance for Seele mit Herz
Chart (2003)	Peak position
German Albums (Offizielle Top 100)	59

== Release history ==
Seele mit Herz release history
Region	Date	Format(s)	Label	Ref.
Various	4 August 2003	Digital download; CD	3p	
