= Jenseits von Gut und Böse (album) =

Studio album by Bushido
- Released: 13 May 2011
- Recorded: 2011
- Genres: Rap; Hip hop
- Length: 55:44 (Standard Edition); 62:04 (Limited Edition); 69:29 (3D Deluxe Edition)
- Labels: ersguterjunge; Sony BMG
- Producers: Bushido; Beatzarre; Djorkaeff; DJ Desue; Araab Muzik; DJ Premier; Rsonist; Benny Blanco; Swizz Beatz

Bushido chronology
Berlins Most Wanted (2010)	Jenseits von Gut und Böse (2011)	23 (2011)

Singles from Jenseits von Gut und Böse
- 1. "Vergiss mich" Released: 22 April 2011; 2. "Wärst du immer noch hier" Released: 3 June 2011

Jenseits von Gut und Böse (German: "Beyond good and evil") is the tenth studio album by German rapper Bushido. It was released as Standard, Limited and 3D Deluxe Edition on 13 May 2011 under his record label ersguterjunge.

The album reached Nr. 1 spot in the album charts of Germany, Austria and Switzerland. It sold 26,117 copies in Germany during the first week after the release.

== Track listing ==
- Information taken from Jenseits von Gut und Böse booklet:

No.	Title	Producer(s)	Length
1.	"Intro"	Bushido, Beatzarre & Djorkaeff	1:27
2.	"Wie ein Löwe" (Like a lion)	Heatmakerz	4:11
3.	"Verreckt" (Pegget out)	DJ Desue	3:40
4.	"Du bist ein Mensch" (You are a human) (featuring Xavier Naidoo)	Bushido, Beatzarre & Djorkaeff	3:35
5.	"Gesucht und gefunden" (Searched and found)	Araab Muzik	4:02
6.	"Vergiss mich" (Forget me) (featuring J-Luv)	Bushido, Beatzarre & Djorkaeff	4:19
7.	"Mo'f**ka" (featuring Swizz Beatz)	Swizz Beatz	3:26
8.	"Schlechte Zeiten" (Bad times)	Bushido, Beatzarre & Djorkaeff	4:01
9.	"Die Art, wie wir leben" (The way, we live) (featuring Booba)	Bushido, Beatzarre & Djorkaeff	3:15
10.	"Gangster" (featuring DJ Premier)	DJ Premier	3:02
11.	"Wärst du immer noch hier?" (Would you still be here?)		3:29
12.	"Dankbar" (Thankful) (featuring J-Luv)	Bushido, Beatzarre & Djorkaeff	3:33
13.	"Hassliebe" (Hate-love)	Bushido, Beatzarre & Djorkaeff	3:44
14.	"Schick mir einen Engel" (Send me an angel)	Benny Blanco	3:02
15.	"Cash Money Brothers" (featuring Kay One)	Bushido, Beatzarre & Djorkaeff	2:57
16.	"Nichts ist für immer" (Nothing is forever)	Bushido, Beatzarre & Djorkaeff	4:01

The Premium edition features two added songs: "Unsterblich" and "Monopol".

Premium edition
No.	Title	Producer(s)	Length
8.	"Unsterblich" (Immortal) (featuring J-Luv)	Bushido, Beatzarre & Djorkaeff	3:23
15.	"Monopol"	Bushido, Beatzarre & Djorkaeff	2:57

The 3D deluxe edition features two added songs: "Das ist Business" and "Gestern war gestern", and contains a second disc, which features all instrumentals.

3D deluxe edition
No.	Title	Length
6.	"Das ist Business" (This is business) (featuring Kay One)	3:57
7.	"Gestern war gestern" (Yesterday was yesterday)	3:28

DVD (Premium & 3D deluxe edition)
No.	Title	Length
1.	"Hauptfilm / Making Of" (Main film / Making Of)	77:26
2.	"Vergiss mich" (Video featuring J-Luv)	04:16
3.	"Outtakes"	19:02

In addition to that an exclusive and limited Media Markt edition of the album exists with also 20 songs. In contrast to the 3D deluxe edition the songs "Das ist Business" and "Gestern war gestern" are missing. Therefore, this edition has two exclusive songs:

Media Markt edition
No.	Title	Length
19.	"Mo'f**ka" (Remix featuring Kay One & Swizz Beatz)	3:25
20.	"Ich weiß" (I know) (Kay One solo)	3:41

Samples

- "Gesucht und gefunden" contains a sample of "Faces" (Ben Gold Vocal Mix) by Andy Moor & Ashley Wallbridge feat. Meighan Nealon

== Charts ==
=== Weekly charts ===
Chart (2011)	Peak position
Austrian Albums (Ö3 Austria)	1
German Albums (Offizielle Top 100)	1
Swiss Albums (Schweizer Hitparade)	1

=== Year-end charts ===
Chart (2011)	Position
Austrian Albums (Ö3 Austria)	69
German Albums (Offizielle Top 100)	63
Swiss Albums (Schweizer Hitparade)	95
