= Mir so nah =

Studio album by Cassandra Steen
- Released: 29 April 2011
- Length: 48:39
- Label: Universal Urban
- Producer: Beatzarre; Djorkaeff; Martin Haas; Sebastian Kirchner; The Krauts; Moses Pelham; Ruben Rodriguez; Thomas Ruffner; Michael Vajna

Cassandra Steen chronology
| Darum leben wir (2009) | Mir so nah (2011) | Spiegelbild (2014) |

Singles from Mir so nah
- 1. "Gebt alles" Released: 1 April 2011; 2. "Tanz" Released: 5 August 2011; 3. "Soo" Released: 2 December 2011

Mir so nah (English: So Close to Me) is the third studio album by German singer Cassandra Steen. It was released by Universal Music Urban on 29 April 2011 in German-speaking Europe. The album became Steen's second consecutive top ten album, peaking at number five on the German Albums Chart.

== Critical reception ==
Professional ratings
Review scores
| Source | Rating |
|---|---|
| laut.de | 2/5 stars |

Aviva editor Lisa Erdmann worte that "of course, Mir So Nah also contains some gentle ballads. But even if you can clearly recognize Moses Pelham's handwriting on titles like "Soo," these songs also combine beautifully familiar and new tones. The soul singer is transforming into a pop icon and the 15 tracks, which she describes as "motivational music," all have incredibly great potential." Ulf Kubanke from laut.de rated the album two out of five stars. He found that "if soul is Moby Dick, then this production is roughly a package of fish fingers. It is precisely that hypothermic Käpt'n Iglo factor that provides this collection with the much-needed bit of sweat and fever. Colleague Joy Denalane showed years ago how to do it really organically and not become an international laughingstock."

== Track listing ==
Mir so nah track listing
| No. | Title | Writer(s) | Producer(s) | Length |
|---|---|---|---|---|
| 1. | "Gebt alles" | Heike Kospach; Adel Tawil; Sebastian Kirchner | Beatzarre; Djorkaeff | 3:44 |
| 2. | "Lange genug Zeit" | Xavier Naidoo; Michael Vajna; Christoph Hessler | Vajna | 3:50 |
| 3. | "Soo" | Moses Pelham; Moses Pelham; Amir Dadashpour | Pelham; Haas | 3:50 |
| 4. | "Tanz" | Kospach; Michael von der Heide; Tawil; Kirchner | Beatzarre; Djorkaeff | 3:31 |
| 5. | "Leben" | Kospach; Cassandra Steen; Thomas Ruffner; Rachel Müller | Thomas Ruffner; Ralf Christian Mayer^{[A]} | 4:29 |
| 6. | "Symphonien" | Ruben Rodriguez; Sebastian Henzl; Armin Rodriguez | R. Rodriguez | 4:47 |
| 7. | "Ich lasse jetzt los" | Naidoo; R. Rodriguez; Henzl | R. Rodriguez | 5:30 |
| 8. | "Wenn Liebe ihren Willen kriegt" | Pelham; Haas; Dadashpour | Pelham; Haas | 5:37 |
| 9. | "Prophetin" | Naidoo; R. Rodriguez; Henzl | R. Rodriguez | 4:16 |
| 10. | "Ich fühl es nicht" | Naidoo; R. Rodriguez; Henzl | R. Rodriguez | 4:12 |
| 11. | "Gib mir mehr" | Kospach; Steen; Tawil; Kirchner | Kirchner | 4:12 |
| 12. | "Camouflage" | Vincent Graf von Schlippenbach; Dirk Berger; David Conen; Mario Wesser; Danny Myrick; Aimée Proal | The Krauts | 3:46 |
| 13. | "Der erste Winter" | Kospach | Beatzarre; Djorkaeff | 3:39 |
| 14. | "Komm näher" | Steen; Ruffner | Ruffner; Mayer^{[A]} | 9:34 |
| 15. | "Bleib einfach nur da" (Hidden track) | Pelham; Haas | Pelham; Haas | 3:57 |
| Total length: | | | | 48:39 |

Notes ^{^[A]} denotes co-producer

== Charts ==
Weekly chart performance for Mir so nah
| Chart (2011) | Peak position |
|---|---|
| Austrian Albums (Ö3 Austria) | 47 |
| German Albums (Offizielle Top 100) | 5 |
| Swiss Albums (Schweizer Hitparade) | 44 |

== Release history ==
Mir so nah release history
| Region | Date | Format(s) | Label |
|---|---|---|---|
| Various | 29 April 2011 | Digital download; CD | Universal Urban |
