= Electro Ghetto =

Studio album by Bushido
- Released: 25 October 2004
- Genre: German hip hop
- Length: 72:47
- Label: ersguterjunge

Bushido chronology
Vom Bordstein bis zur Skyline (2003)	Electro Ghetto (2004)	Carlo Cokxxx Nutten II (2005)

Singles from Electro Ghetto
- 1. "Electro Ghetto" Released: 25 October 2004; 2. "Nie wieder" Released: 5 December 2004; 3. "Hoffnung stirbt zuletzt" Released: 30 January 2005

Professional ratings
Review scores
Source	Rating
AllMusic	4/5 stars
laut.de	3/5 stars

Electro Ghetto is the second studio album by German rapper Bushido. It released on 25 October 2004 by his newly founded record label ersguterjunge and Universal Music Group. This was the first record since he has left former label Aggro Berlin.

== Background ==
After the success of his debut album Vom Bordstein bis zur Skyline Bushido left the label Aggro Berlin due to personal issues with the label's founders Specter, Spaiche and Halil Efe and signed to Universal Music, where he founded with fellow rapper D-Bo the label ersguterjunge. Bremen rapper Baba Saad, who was 18 years old that time, has been discovered through the internet by D-Bo and Bushido, and invited him for the album's recording session, where he ended up being frequently featured on the album. Saad later signed to ersguterjunge and joined Bushido on his tour Auf die harte Tour as backup.

== Recording ==
Electro Ghetto was finished within eight weeks, according to Bushido himself was it his shortest album release. According to Baba Saad, it took 35 minutes for the song's development, including writing the lyrics and the production. All the songs were recorded in the same studio in Berlin, with the guest artists, who were all important for Bushido, because they were personal friends of him.

The guest vocals by singer Cassandra Steen on the single "Hoffnung stirbt zuletzt" was Bushido's personal wish, wherefore he asked her for a collaboration, and Steen agreed which surprised Bushido, who did not expect her answer. Baba Saad is featured on three songs, called "Ersguterjunge", "Gangbang" (with fellow Berlin rapper Bass Sultan Hengzt) und "Wenn wir kommen". The song "Gangbang" was later indexed and removed from the album, due to the song's topic of penetrating a woman three-ways (oral, anal and vaginal).

== Commercial performances ==
In the third week of its release, the album debuted at number 6 on the German charts and stayed for 16 weeks in the top 100.

== Track listing ==
No.	Title	Producer(s)	Length
1.	"Intro"	Bushido	2:06
2.	"Electro Ghetto"	DJ Ilan	3:43
3.	"Kopf Hoch" (Cheer up)	Beathoavenz	4:00
4.	"KORS is One" (Skit)		1:04
5.	"Ersguterjunge" (featuring Baba Saad)	DJ Ilan	4:32
6.	"Schmetterling" (Butterfly)	D-Bo	3:52
7.	"Typisch Ich" (Typical me)	DJ Desue	3:27
8.	"Ewige Nacht" (Eternal night) (featuring Azad, Chaker & Bossbitch Berlin)	DJ Ilan	4:18
9.	"Teufelskreis" (Vicious circle) (featuring Sentino)	Bushido	3:08
10.	"Gangbang" (featuring Baba Saad & Bass Sultan Hengzt)	DJ Ilan	4:33
11.	"Deutschland gib' mir ein Mic" (Germany give me a mic) (featuring Sentino)	DJ Desue	3:51
12.	"Gemein wie 100" (Mean as 100) (featuring King Ali)	Beathoavenz	3:50
13.	"Knast oder Ruhm" (Jail or fame)	Rizbo	3:45
14.	"Kors" (Skit) (featuring Se Left Crowd)		1:18
15.	"Wenn wir kommen" (When we come) (featuring Baba Saad)	DJ Desue	3:52
16.	"Feuersturm" (Fire storm) (featuring Azad & Bossbitch Berlin)	DJ Ilan	4:07
17.	"Hoffnung stirbt zuletzt" (Hope dies last) (featuring Cassandra Steen)	DJ Ilan	6:45
18.	"Watch Me Now" (Skit)		1:11
19.	"Ihr wartet drauf" (You're waiting for it)	DJ Desue	4:11
20.	"Electro Ghetto" (Skit)		0:36
21.	"Nie wieder" (Never again)	DJ Desue	3:52
22.	"Outro"		0:46

Samples

- "Electro Ghetto" contains a sample of "Towards the Gate of Stars" by Mortiis
- "Ersguterjunge" contains a sample of "Jóga" by Björk
- "Knast oder Ruhm" contains a sample of "Breathe" by Fabolous
- "Hoffnung stirbt zuletzt" contains a sample of "Reprise" by Sophia
- "Nie Wieder" contains a sample of "Don't Break My Love" by The Hiltonaires & The Air Mail
