= Darum leben wir =

Studio album by Cassandra Steen
- Released: 20 February 2009
- Length: 64:12
- Label: Universal Urban
- Producer: Mathias Grosch; Andreas Herbig; Paul NZA; Oliver Pinelli; Marek Pompetzki

Cassandra Steen chronology
Seele mit Herz (2003)	Darum leben wir (2009)	Mir so nah (2011)

Darum leben wir (English: That Is Why We Live) is the second studio album by German singer Cassandra Steen. It was released by Universal Urban on 20 February 2009 in German-speaking Europe. Darum leben wir marked Steen's first release after parting ways with her long-time collaborators Moses Pelham and Martin Haas and their record label 3P. The singer worked with Marek Pompetzki and Paul NZA on the majority of the album, while additional production was provided by Mathias Grosch, Andreas Herbig, and Oliver Pinelli. Steen's biggest commercial success, it was certified gold by the Bundesverband Musikindustrie (BVMI), indicating sales in excess of 100,000 units.

== Critical reception ==
Professional ratings
Review scores
Source	Rating
laut.de	1/5 stars
Terrorverlag	5/10 stars

Christiane Stuckemeier vom Terrorverlag rated the album five out of ten stars. She found that "with 11 tracks and a remix of the title song, Steen offers continuity without repeating herself with her soulful voice. Gentle but haunting, three quarters of an hour of chilled beats, string arrangements or well-dosed acoustic guitar offer a lot for the mood – so not for those with an allergy to emotions." laut.de editor Dani Fromm rated the album one out of five stars. She wrote: "No help in sight, at least not on the musical side. While the generally acceptable title track and opening song [...] is at least somewhat memorable in the chorus, the rest of the album lacks any zest."

== Track listing ==
Darum leben wir track listing
No.	Title	Writer(s)	Producer(s)	Length
1.	"Darum leben wir" (Radio Version)	Flo Fischer; Sebastian Kirchner; Heike Kospach; Adel Tawil	Andreas Herbig	3:39
2.	"Lass mich nicht hier" (featuring Xavier Naidoo)	Steen; Cihan Bulut; Naidoo; Thomas Ruffner; Jochen Weiss	Marek Pompetzki; Paul NZA	4:02
3.	"Eis"	Fischer; Kospach; Kirchner; Pompetzki; Tawil; NZA	Pompetzki; NZA	3:36
4.	"Glaub ihnen kein Wort"	Fischer; Kirchner; Kospach; Tawil	Herbig; Oliver Pinelli^{[A]}	3:28
5.	"Unendlich"	Steen; Ruffner	Pompetzki; NZA	3:42
6.	"Es ist wahr"	Naidoo; Mathias Grosch	Grosch	4:07
7.	"Stadt" (featuring Adel Tawil)	Fischer; Kirchner; Kospach; NZA; Pompetzki; Tawil	Pompetzki; NZA	3:04
8.	"Funken Liebe"	Fischer; Annette Humpe; Herbig; Kirchner; Pinelli; Tawil; Jovanka von Willsdorf	Herbig; Pinelli^{[A]}	4:35
9.	"Rette mich"	Steen; Franco Parisi; Götz von Sydow	Pompetzki; NZA	4:18
10.	"Fallen nach oben"	Kospach; Tobias Röger; von Sydow	Pompetzki; NZA	3:09
11.	"Engel"	Julian "J-Luv" Williams	Pompetzki; NZA	2:54
12.	"Darum leben wir" (Numarek Remix)	Fischer; Kirchner; Kospach; Tawil	Pompetzki; NZA; Numarek	3:31
Total length:				64:12

Notes

^{^[A]} denotes co-producer

== Charts ==
=== Weekly charts ===
Weekly chart performance for Darum leben wir
Chart (2009)	Peak position
Austrian Albums (Ö3 Austria)	65
German Albums (Offizielle Top 100)	10

=== Year-end charts ===
Year-end chart performance for Darum leben wir
Chart (2009)	Position
German Albums (Official Top 100)	67

== Certifications ==
Certifications for Darum leben wir
Region	Certification	Certified units/sales
Germany (BVMI)	Gold	100,000^{^}
^{^} Shipments figures based on certification alone.

== Release history ==
Darum leben wir release history
Region	Date	Format(s)	Label
Various	20 February 2009	Digital download; CD	Universal Urban
