= Carlo Cokxxx Nutten II =

Studio album by Bushido and Baba Saad
- Released: 4 April 2005; 24 February 2006 (Ltd. Pur Edition)
- Genres: German hip hop, gangsta rap
- Length: 45:13
- Label: ersguterjunge
- Producers: Bushido & DJ Ilan

Bushido chronology
Electro Ghetto (2004)	Carlo Cokxxx Nutten II (2005)	Staatsfeind Nr. 1 (2005)

Baba Saad chronology
Carlo Cokxxx Nutten II (2005)	Das Leben ist Saad (2006)

Singles from Carlo Cokxxx Nutten II
- 1. "Nie ein Rapper" Released: 4 April 2005

Carlo Cokxxx Nutten II is a collaboration album between the German rappers Bushido (a.k.a. Sonny Black) and Baba Saad, released in 2005. It is a follow-up to 2002's Carlo Cokxxx Nutten.

== Background ==
Bushido had planned a follow-up to Carlo Cokxxx Nutten, which he had recorded with Fler. Because of the feud between Bushido and Fler, Baba Saad replaced him.

Bushido used the pseudonym "Sonny Black" again, like he did on the preceding album, where Fler had used the pseudonym "Frank White". Bushido entirely produced the album's beats, which contain samples of the band Arcana.

On 24 February 2006, a Ltd. Pur Edition of the album was released.

== Track listing ==
Bushido produced the whole album, except track 1 ("Intro"), which was produced by DJ Ilan.

No.	Title	Translation	Length
1.	"Intro"		1:01
2.	"Immer noch"	Still	3:05
3.	"Oh nein"	Oh no	2:45
4.	"Fickdeinemutterslang"	Fuck-your-mom-slang	3:42
5.	"Denk an mich"	Think of me	3:25
6.	"Ghettorap hin, Ghettorap her"	Ghetto rap back, ghetto rap forth	3:21
7.	"Sonny Black"		2:48
8.	"Nie ein Rapper"	Never a rapper	4:05
9.	"Also komm..."	So come on...	3:20
10.	"Träume im Dunkeln" (featuring D-Bo)	Dreams in the dark	3:45
11.	"Wer ist dieser Junge?"	Who is that boy?	2:59
12.	"Besoffene Kinder"	Drunk kids	3:03
13.	"Es tut mir leid"	I'm sorry	4:10
14.	"Du bist out"	You're out	2:58
15.	"Taliban"		4:04

Samples

- "Denk an mich" contains a sample of "The Windy Shore" by Iridio
- "Ghettorap hin, Ghettorap her" contains a sample of "Wind of the Lost Souls" by Arcana
- "Sonny Black" contains a sample of "March of Loss" by Arcana
- "Nie ein Rapper" contains a sample of "Innocent Child" by Arcana
- "Also komm..." contains a sample of "We Rise Above" by Arcana
- "Träume im Dunkeln" contains a sample of "Fade Away" by Arcana
- "Besoffene Kinder" contains a sample of "Sono La Salva" by Arcana
- "Es tut mir leid" contains a sample of "Abschied" by Sopor Aeternus & The Ensemble of Shadows
- "Taliban" contains a sample of "Lament" by Arcana

== Personnel ==
- Artwork by Dirk Rudolph
- Lyrics by Bushido (tracks 2–5 and 7–15), D-Bo (track 10), and Baba Saad (tracks 2–6 and 8–15)
- Mastered by Bommer
- Mixed and recorded by DJ Ilan
- Photography by Kasskara
