= Das Leben ist Saad =

Studio album by Baba Saad
- Released: 16 July 2006
- Genre: German hip hop
- Length: 57:56
- Label: ersguterjunge
- Producer: Decay, Bushido, Beatlefield

Baba Saad chronology
Carlo Cokxxx Nutten II (2005)	Das Leben ist Saad (2006)	Saadcore (2008)

Das Leben ist Saad ("Life is Saad") is the first solo album by German rapper Baba Saad. It was released in 2006. The album sold over 30,000 records.

== Track listing ==
No.	Title	Length
1.	"Intro"	1:10
2.	"Grün - Weiß WB" (Green - White WB)	3:15
3.	"Glaub an dich" (featuring Chakuza)	3:03
4.	"Womit hab ich das verdient" (How Did I Deserve This?)	3:36
5.	"Gefangen" (featuring Azad)	3:55
6.	"S Doppel A" (S Double A)	3:11
7.	"Was mir fehlt" (What I'm Missing)	3:18
8.	"Die Letzten werden die Ersten sein" (featuring Eko Fresh)	3:38
9.	"Komm endlich zurück" (featuring Bahar)	3:33
10.	"Prost auf dich" (featuring Bushido)	3:31
11.	"!! Wieso !!" (featuring Bizzy Montana)	2:45
12.	"Das Leben ist Saad" (Life Is Saad)	3:17
13.	"Ich halt die Stellung" (I Keep the Position)	3:53
14.	"Verschwunden" (featuring D-Bo)	3:43
15.	"Unterschätzt" (Underestimated)	3:02
16.	"Carlo, Cokxxx, Nutten Flavor" (featuring Bushido)	2:57
17.	"Um uns herum" (featuring JokA)	4:04
18.	"Outro"	2:05
Total length:		60:20
