= Ekaveli =

Studio album by Eko Fresh
- Released: November 23, 2007
- Recorded: 2006–2007
- Genre: Hip hop
- Label: ersguterjunge Sony BMG

Eko Fresh chronology
| Hart(z) IV (2006) | Ekaveli (2007) |

Ekaveli is the third studio album by German-Turkish rapper Eko Fresh. The title was influenced by the westcoast rap legend 2Pac, whose alternate stage name was "Makaveli". It was released in 2007.

== Track listing ==
1. "Intro"
2. "Et kütt wie et kütt"
3. "Sie sind überall" ("They are everywhere") (featuring Summer Cem)
4. "Ring frei" ("Ring free") (featuring Bushido)
5. "Bis ich unter der Erde lieg" (featuring Outlawz)
6. "Gefallene Soldaten" (featuring G-Style)
7. "Westcoast"
8. "Ich bleib so, wie ich bin" ("I stay, how I am") (featuring Abo)
9. "Jedem das seine"
10. "Ihr Herz ist so Ghetto" ("Her heart is so ghetto") (featuring Capkekz)
11. "Irgendwann" (featuring Farid Bang)
12. "Es interessiert"
13. "Cologne City Street Blues" (featuring Gangsta Lu)
14. "Es tut mir leid" ("I'm sorry") (featuring Karim & G-Style)
15. "Ein Tag"
16. "Stenzprominenz" (featuring Hakan Abi, Ice H, Kingsize, SDiddy, La-Honda, Prodycem)
17. "Ohne dich" (Without you")
18. "Seid ihr jetzt zufrieden?"
19. "Outro"
