= Berlins Most Wanted =

Berlin rap group

- Also known as: BMW
- Origin: Berlin, Germany
- Genres: Hip hop, rap
- Years active: Early 2000s 2010
- Labels: I Luv Money, ersguterjunge
- Members: Bushido; Kay One; Fler
- Past members: King Orgasmus One; Bass Sultan Hengzt; Silla

Berlins Most Wanted (BMW) is a Berlin rap group founded by rappers Bushido, Bass Sultan Hengzt, and King Orgasmus One. The date of the foundation is not clearly known, but the artists were represented together under the group's name on some albums, including King of KingZ (2001) by Bushido, and on King Orgasmus' albums Sexkönig (1998) and Berlin bleibt hart (2002) (with Bass Sultan Hengzt).

In 2010, Bushido re-founded the group with Kay One and Fler. Bushido copyright the group's name by the German Patent and Trademark Office.

== History ==
Berlins Most Wanted was formed in the early 2000s by the Berlin-based rappers Bushido, Bass Sultan Hengzt and King Orgasmus One, who were all signed to the label I Luv Money Records. In 2001, Bushido signed to Aggro Berlin and planned to work on an album with Berlin Most Wanted. However, due to the delay of the recording process, the album was canceled and Bushido focused on his work with Fler on Carlo Cokxxx Nutten.

In August 2010, Bushido trademarked the group's name with the German Patent and Trademark Office. He re-founded the group with Fler and Kay One and they released the self-titled album on 22 October 2010. The album ranked on the 45th calendar week of 2010 on number 2 in the German charts. The double A side single "Berlin's Most Wanted" and "Weg eines Krieges" released on 8 October 2010 and videos were made for both songs, directed by French director Chris Macari.

== Discography ==
- Berlins Most Wanted (2010)
