= Kenneth allein zu Haus =

Studio album by Kay One
- Released: 7 May 2010
- Recorded: Beatzarre Studio, Berlin, Germany
- Genre: German hip hop
- Label: ersguterjunge
- Producers: Beatzarre; Djorkaeff; Bushido; Leander Bauer; Philippe Heithier

Kay One chronology
Kenneth allein zu Haus (2010)	Berlins Most Wanted (2010)

Singles from Kenneth allein zu Haus
- 1. "Ich brech die Herzen" Released: 30 April 2010

Singles from Kenneth allein zu Haus
- 1. "Style & das Geld"

Professional Reviews
Reviewer	Rating
laut.de	3/5 stars
rap.de	4/5 stars
rappers.in	2.5/6 stars

Kenneth allein zu Haus ("Kenneth Home Alone") is the debut album by German rapper Kay One, released on 30 April 2010 via ersguterjunge. It was also released as a premium edition with three added songs, while the standard edition features 18 songs. The album features guest appearances of Fler, Bushido, Philippe Heithier, Frauenarzt, Nyze, and his former partner Benny Blanko.

The song "Style & das Geld" was released as a promotional single. The lead single "Ich brech die Herzen" reached No. 67 in Germany.

The album's title is based on the film Home Alone (1990), which is titled Kevin – Allein zu Haus ("Kevin – Home Alone") in Germany.

== Music and production ==
The album was recorded, mixed and mastered in record producer Beatzarre's studio in Berlin. All songs were produced by Beatzarre & Djorkaeff, except "Bitte vergiess mich nicht" (produced with Leander Bauer and Philippe Heithier) "Du fehlst mir" (produced with Bushido) and "Nie vorbei" (produced with Philippe Heithier).

All the lyrics written by Kay One, except "Intro", "Style & das Geld", "Du fehlst mir" and "Outro" (written with Bushido). "Verzeih mir", "Bitte vergiss mich nicht" and "Nie vorbei" (written with Philippe Heithier). "Bis die Polizei kommt" (written with Frauenarzt), "Rockstar" (written with Nyze & Benny Blanko) and "Deine Zeit kommt" (written with Fler).

German singer-songwriter Philipper Heithier provided his vocals on four songs "Verzeih mir", "Bitte vergiess mich nicht", "Nichts ist für immer" and "Nie vorbei". Rapper and mentor Bushido is featured on two songs "Style & das Geld", credit as Sonny Black, and "Du fehlst mir" and on the intro and outro skit. "Style & das Geld" contains vocal samples from Bushido of "Carlo Cokxxx Flashback" from Carlo Cokxxx Nutten 2.

Rapper Frauenarzt is featured on "Bis die Polizei kommt". Labelmate Fler is featured on the ong "Deine Zeit kommt". The song "Rockstar" features his labelmate Nyze and Benny Blanko.

Bojan Assenov provided the piano to "Verzeih mir". Arndt Christoph performed trumpet on the song "Ein guter Tag", while the guitar and bass was performed by Marius Mahn.

== Track listing ==
No.	Title	Translation	Length
1.	"Intro" (Skit with Bushido)		3:00
2.	"Kenneth allein zu Haus"	Kenneth home alone	3:25
3.	"Sexy Teens"		3:06
4.	"Irgendwann"	Some day	3:38
5.	"Style & das Geld" (featuring Sonny Black alias Bushido)	Style & the money	3:15
6.	"Verzeih mir" (featuring Philippe Heithier)	Forgive me	3:21
7.	"So allein"	So alone	3:37
8.	"Bis die Polizei kommt" (featuring Frauenarzt)	Until the police comes	3:41
9.	"Tierheim" (Skit)	Dog pound	1:40
10.	"Ich brech die Herzen"	I break the hearts	3:48
11.	"Rockstar" (featuring Nyze & Benny Blanko)		4:31
12.	"Bitte vergiss mich nicht" (featuring Philippe Heithier)	Please don't forget me	4:25
13.	"Du fehlst mir" (featuring Bushido)	I miss you	3:04
14.	"Deine Zeit kommt" (featuring Fler)	Your time comes	3:58
15.	"Ein guter Tag"	A good day	5:43
16.	"Bushido"		3:36
17.	"Noch zu lernen"	Still to learn	3:32
18.	"Nichts ist für immer" (featuring Philippe Heithier)	Nothing is forever	4:12
19.	"In Liebe, dein Bruder"	In love, your brother	3:24
20.	"Nie vorbei" (featuring Philippe Heithier)	Never over	3:41
21.	"Outro" (Skit with Bushido)		2:39

(*) The tracks 14, 17 & 18 are only featured on the Premium edition

Samples

- "Style & das Geld" contains samples of "Carlo Coxxx Flashback" by Bushido & Fler (alias Sonny Black & Frank White)

== Charting ==
Kenneth allein zu Haus was #7 in the German charts in the 21st week of 2010. In the following weeks, it dropped to positions 41, 73, and 76 before leaving the top 100 after 6 weeks.

Ich brech die Herzen was released as a single on 30 April 2010. The single placed 67th in the Top 100 before dropping out the following week.
