= Cassandra Steen =

German singer (born 1980)

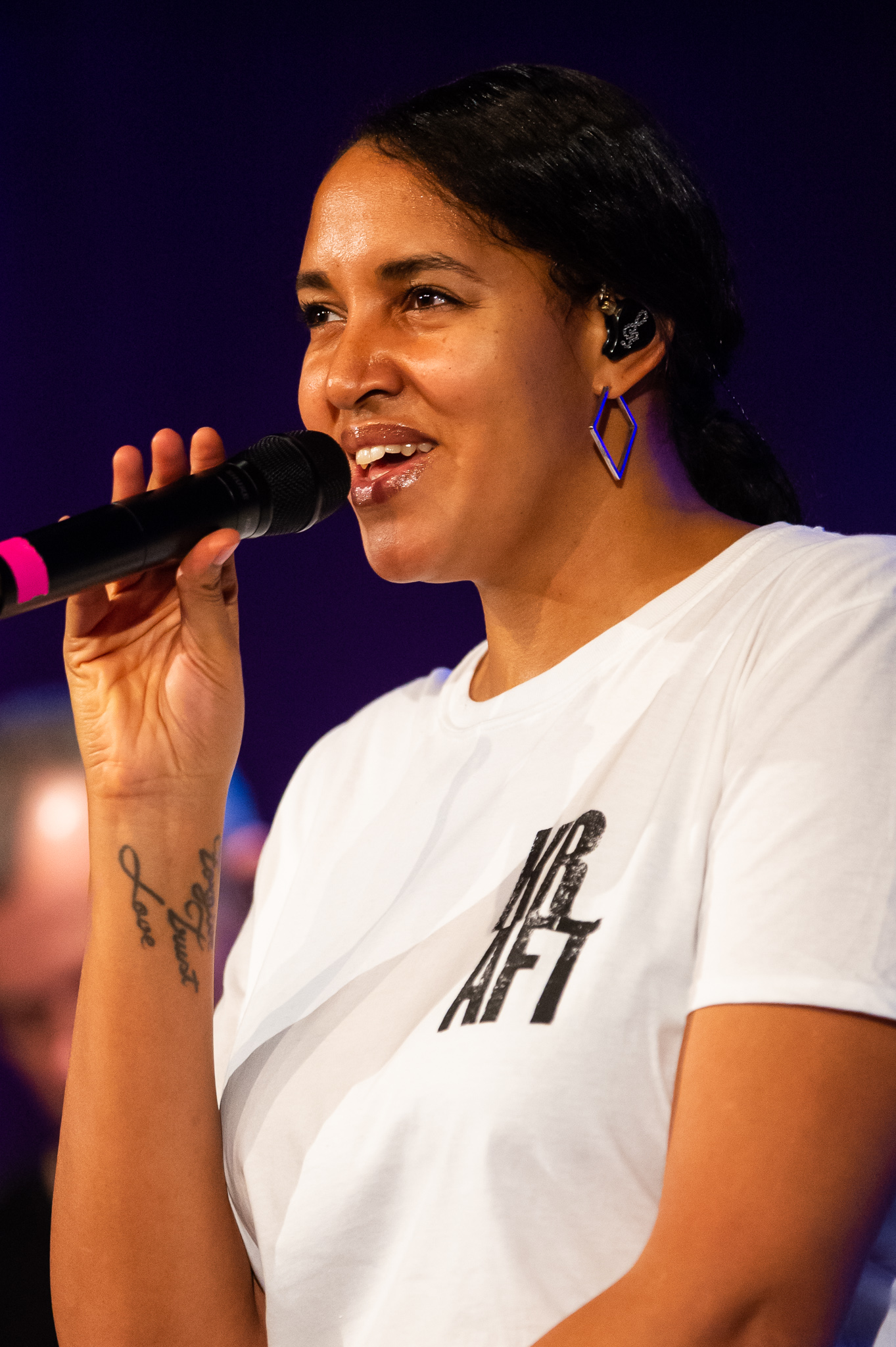
- Steen in 2019

Background information
- Born: 9 February 1980 (age 45); Ostfildern-Ruit, West Germany
- Genres: Soul; R&B; pop
- Occupation: Singer
- Years active: 1997–present
- Member of: Glashaus
- Spouse: Stéphan Kocijan (m. 2013; div. 2020)
- Website: cassandra-steen.de

Cassandra Steen (born 9 February 1980) is a German singer who rose to fame as the lead singer of the pop/soul trio Glashaus. After a series of commercially successful releases with the group, she released her moderately successful solo debut album Seele mit Herz in 2003 and has been active as both a solo artist and as part of Glashaus since.

== Biography ==
=== Early life and career ===
Steen is an only child born to a German mother and an African-American father in Ostfildern-Ruit near Stuttgart, Germany in 1980.

In 1997, Steen's demo tape got into the hands of a befriended producer, who passed it to an up-and-coming hip hop group, he was working with: Freundeskreis. Impressed by her voice, Steen was invited to contribute backing vocals to the trio's 1997 debut album Quadratur des Kreises, gaining her first official feature credit on their collaboration "Telefonterror". The following year she appeared in Freundeskreis' music video for their single "Wenn der Vorhang fällt" and accompanied the band on their first tour throughout German-speaking Europe.

Further collaborations with Freundeskreis failed to materialize as Steen decided to move to Hamburg in hopes of a solo career launch and soon she was offered a contract with the independent label Booya Records. Due to musical differences she soon asked for a release however.

=== Breakthrough with Glashaus ===
In 2000, 3p label head Moses Pelham took notice of Steen after listening to her demo tape. Following a first meeting in February 2000, the pair began recording "So Lange", a song that appeared on the 3p compilation album Evolution. Steen eventually signed a solo contract with the Frankfurt-based soul label and started work on what initially was to be her solo album but soon moved into a collaborative endeavor and finally emerged as the debut album of Glashaus, a trio consisting of Steen, Pelham and 3p studio musician Martin Haas, with Steen contributing the lead vocals. After months of recording the group released their debut single, the piano ballad "Wenn das Liebe ist", in 2001. The song became an instant success, reaching number five on the German Singles Chart, and garnered the band three ECHO Award nominations. Four albums later, the band unofficially disbanded in 2006. Steen decided not reunite with Pelham and Hass for another album and in 2009, she was replaced with a new female leading singer.

=== Solo career ===
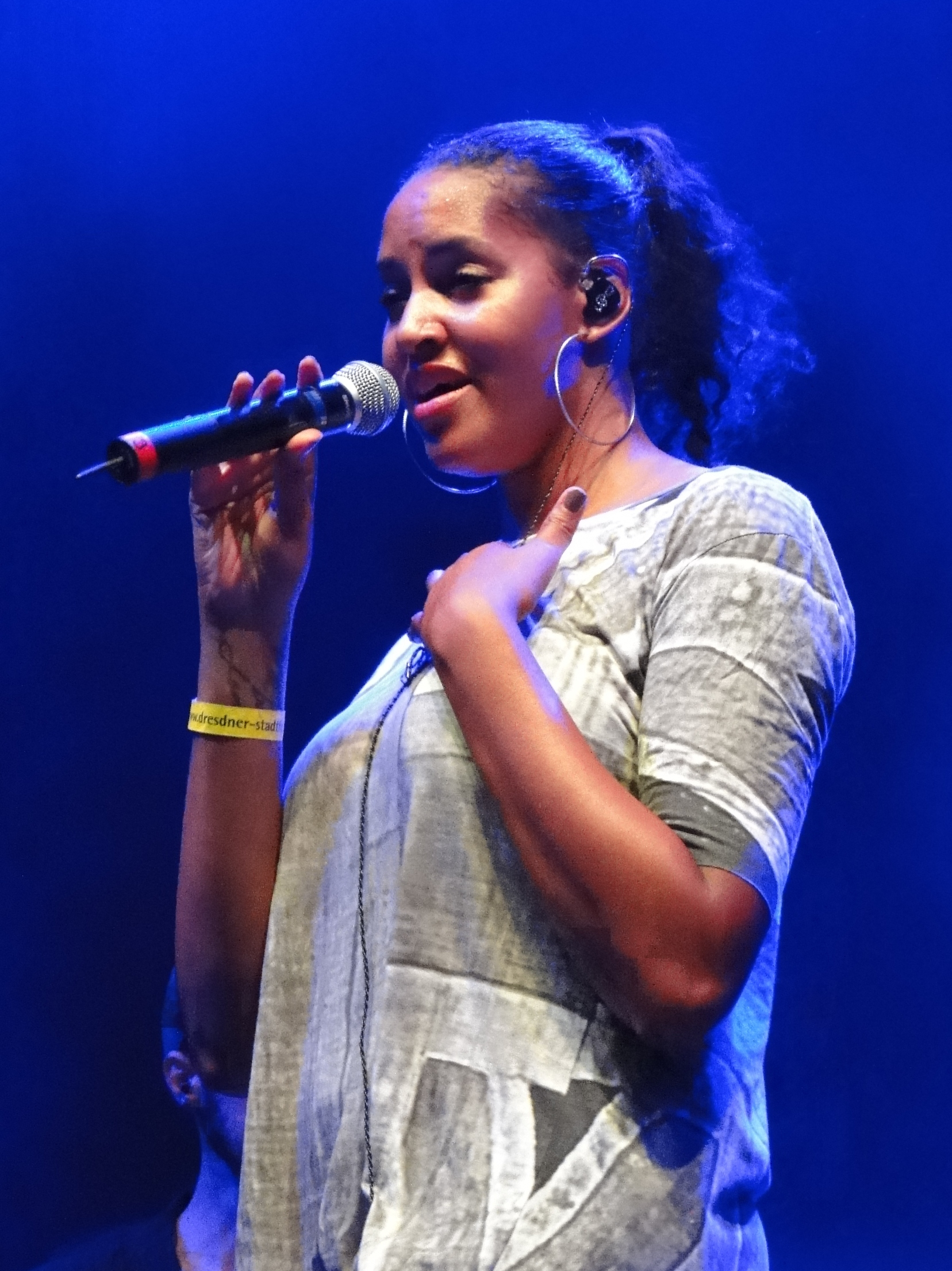
Steen performing in 2011

Among three successful albums and a number of hit singles the trio also partially produced Cassandra's solo album, Seele mit Herz, which was eventually released in summer 2003 and yielded the slow jam "Wie du lachst" as its lead single. Both the album and the single were a critical success but widely failed to chart or sell noticeably on the German charts. Additionally, Steen continued singing background and chorus for label mates Illmatic, Franziska and Setlur, and made guest appearances on several new releases by J-Luv, W4C, Melbeatz, Bushido and Curse. Her collaboration with rapper Azad, "Eines Tages", was released in 2006.

In February 2009, Steen released her second studio Darum leben wir via the Universal Domestic/Urban label. Containing production by Marek Pompetzki & Paul NZA, Andreas Herbig und Michael Herberger, the album reached the top ten of the German Albums Chart and sold more than 100,000 copies domestically, resulting in a gold certification by the IFPI. The album's same-titled lead single reached number six on the German Singles Chart and was chosen to represent Baden-Württemberg on the 5th Bundesvision Song Contest where Steen finished fourth with 103 points. The second single "Stadt", a collaboration with Ich + Ich singer Adel Tawil, was released to even greater success, reaching number two in Germany and the top five in Austria. It eventually became the fourth biggest-selling single of 2009 in Germany.

Also in 2009, Steen voiced the character Tiana in the German dub of Disney's 49th animated feature The Princess and the Frog. "Never Knew I Needed", a duet with original singer Ne-Yo, was the first single to be lifted from the accompanying soundtrack. In 2010, she won the ECHO Award for Best National Artist Rock/Pop.

In 2011, her third album Mir so nah (2011) was released. It produced the top 30 single "Tanz" and was followed by her 2014 album Spiegelbild. A prominent featured vocalist, Steen's discography also includes the hit singles "Hoffnung stirbt zuletzt" with rapper Bushido, "Eines Tages" with rapper Azad, and the duet "Unter die Haut" with singer Tim Bendzko.

In 2016, Steen re-joined Glashaus. The following year, she appeared alongside band mate Moses Pelham on the German reality television series Sing meinen Song – Das Tauschkonzert.

== Personal life ==
Steen holds both German and American citizenship.

She married her manager Stéphan Kocijan in December 2013. 2020 she was divorced.

== Discography ==
=== Studio albums ===
- Seele mit Herz (2003)
- Darum leben wir (2009)
- Mir so nah (2011)
- Spiegelbild (2014)
- Der Weihnachtsgedanke (2020)
