= Baba Saad =

- Born: Saad El-Haddad; 26 November 1985 (age 40); Beirut, Lebanon
- Genres: German hip hop
- Occupation: Rapper
- Years active: 2004–present
- Label: Halunkenbande

Saad El-Haddad (Arabic: سعد الحداد; born 26 November 1985), better known by his stage names Baba Saad or just Saad, is a German rapper of Lebanese descent.

== Early life ==
Baba Saad was born in Beirut, Lebanon, but emigrated to Syke in northern Germany in 1994.

== Career ==
In early 2005, Saad was featured alongside Bushido in the joint album Carlo Cokxxx Nutten 2. In the summer of 2005, he got signed to Bushido's label ersguterjunge. At the end of 2005, he was featured on Bushido's album Staatsfeind Nr. 1.

In the spring of 2006, Saad released his own album, called Das Leben ist Saad ("Life is Saad").

In March 2011, he joined newcomer Haftbefehl at a concert and announced after the performance that he had left ersguterjunge. In an interview, he later stated that there were creative differences between him and the label. Moving on, he founded his own record label called Halunkenbande. But just a few months after signing the rappers Dú Maroc and SadiQ, Saad announced that he couldn't focus on the label at the moment because of a stroke of fate that caused him to move back to Lebanon.

After his return to Germany in 2013—Dú Maroc and SadiQ had meanwhile been dropped by the label—Saad continued both his career and the label management, signing EstA and Punch Arogunz.

In April 2013, his latest solo album S Doppel A D was released.

== Discography ==
=== Solo albums ===
- 2005: Carlo Cokxxx Nutten II (with Bushido a.k.a. Sonny Black)
- 2006: Das Leben ist Saad
- 2008: Saadcore
- 2011: Halunke
- 2013: S Doppel A D
- 2013: Beuteschema (with EstA and Punch Arogunz)
- 2014: Das Leben ist Saadcore
- 2017: Yayo Tape II

=== Singles ===
- 2005: "Nie ein Rapper" (with Bushido a.k.a. Sonny Black) (Carlo Cokxxx Nutten II)
- 2006: "Womit hab ich das verdient" (Das Leben ist Saad)
- 2008: "Hier geht es nicht um dich" (Saadcore)
- 2008: "Regen" (feat. Bushido) (Saadcore)

== Other releases and free tracks ==
Year	Title	Info(s)
2004	"Mein Cock" ("My cock") (feat. Bushido)	Released on the Nie Wieder maxi single
2005	"Ich halt' die Stellung" ("I hold the line")	Released on the Augenblick maxi single
2007	"Ausnahmezustand" ("State of emergency")	Internet exclusive
2007	"Asphalt Massaker"	Released on the Alles Gute kommt von unten maxi single
2008	"Deutschlands Most Wanted" ("Germanys Most Wanted")	Juice exclusive #83
2009	"Mein Job" ("My job")	
2010	"To22i Mouti"	
2010	"Intro/Schusswechsel" ("Intro/Shootout")	
2013	"Mein Tag" ("My day") (feat. EstA)	Promotional free track
2013	"Jim Knopf" ("Jim Button")	Kay One diss track, recorded over the beat of "Berlin" by Bushido
