= Berlins Most Wanted (album) =

German rap album

Studio album by Berlins Most Wanted
- Released: 22 October 2010
- Recorded: 2010
- Genre: German hip hop
- Length: 60:34 (standard edition); 71:45 (limited deluxe edition)
- Labels: ersguterjunge; Sony BMG
- Producers: Bushido; Djorkaeff; Beatzarre

Bushido chronology
Zeiten ändern dich (2010)	Berlins Most Wanted (2010)	Jenseits von Gut und Böse (2011)

Fler chronology
Flersguterjunge (2010)	Berlins Most Wanted (2010)	Airmax Muzik II (2011)

Kay One chronology
Kenneth allein zu Haus (2010)	Berlins Most Wanted (2010)	Prince of Belvedair (2012)

Singles from Berlins Most Wanted
- 1. "Berlins Most Wanted" Released: 8 October 2010

Berlins Most Wanted is an album by German rap group Berlins Most Wanted, consisting of Bushido, Fler, and Kay One. It released as Standard and Limited Deluxe Edition on 22 October 2010, by ersguterjunge.

== Track listing ==
No.	Title	Length
1.	"Intro"	2:39
2.	"Was du machst in 'nem Monat" (What you do in one month)	4:37
3.	"Weg eines Kriegers" (Way of a warrior)	3:59
4.	"Schlampen" (Sluts) (Skit)	0:52
5.	"Sie wissen, wer wir sind" (They know, who we are)	3:14
6.	"Lauf, Nutte, lauf!" (Run, bitch, run!)	3:51
7.	"Mein Ein und Alles" (My one and everything)	4:05
8.	"Für dich da sein" (Be there for you)	4:40
9.	"Die ganze Galaxie" (The whole galaxy)	3:26
10.	"Rapstar"	4:13
11.	"Teufel auf Erden" (Devil on earth)	3:46
12.	"Alles anders" (Everything different) (Skit)	0:49
13.	"Geld, Sex und Ruhm" (Money, sex and fame)	3:46
14.	"Berlins Most Wanted"	3:55
15.	"Nur Gott kann uns richten" (Only god can judge us)	3:57
16.	"Wunschkonzert" (Request concert)	4:16
17.	"Das ist Hip Hop" (This is hip hop)	3:55
18.	"Outro"	0:34

Limited deluxe edition
No.	Title	Length
19.	"Ich hatte einen Traum" (I have a dream) (Kay One solo)	3:43
20.	"Keiner hält mich auf" (Nobody can stop me) (Fler solo)	3:37
21.	"9 Millimeter, Koks und Geld" (9 millimeter, coke and money) (Bushido solo)	3:51

== Ratings ==
rap.de criticized the skits of the album and called it overall dry, but recommended it to people who were already fans of the three rappers. The album was heavily criticized by laut.de.

== Charts ==
Chart (2010)	Peak position
Austrian Albums (Ö3 Austria)	3
German Albums (Offizielle Top 100)	2
Swiss Albums (Schweizer Hitparade)	3
