= Prince of Belvedair =

Studio album by Kay One
- Released: 2012
- Genres: Rap, Hip hop
- Label: ersguterjunge

Kay One chronology
Berlins Most Wanted (2010)	Prince of Belvedair (2012)

Singles from Kenneth allein zu Haus
- 1. "I Need A Girl (Part Three)" Released: 2012

Prince of Belvedair is the second studio album by German rapper Kay One, known from his work with German rapper Bushido. The album was released on March 16, 2012, by ersguterjunge as Standard and Premium Edition under Bushido's label ersguterjunge.

The first single released from the album was titled "I Need A Girl (Part Three)" which features American singer Mario Winans and reached number 239 in the German Albums Chart. The music video for "I Need A Girl (Part Three)" reached 8 million views on YouTube.

The album name is a reference to The Fresh Prince of Bel-Air, an American television sitcom.

== Track listing ==
All tracks were produced by Beatzarre and Djorkaeff, except track 2 ("Prince of Belvadair") was produced by 3Nity and Abaz, and track 3 ("Besser im Bett") was produced by Abaz.

No.	Title	Title translation	Length
1.	"Intro" (Skit with Beatzarre)		2:14
2.	"Prince of Belvedair" (featuring Emory)		3:38
3.	"Besser im Bett"	Better in bed	3:06
4.	"Rain On You" (featuring Emory)		3:00
5.	"Herz aus Stein"	Heart of stone	3:49
6.	"Sportsfreund" (featuring Shindy)	Sports fan	3:04
7.	"Zeiten ändern sich" (Skit with Bushido)	Times are changing	1:52
8.	"P1"		3:17
9.	"I Need A Girl Part 3" (featuring Mario Winans)		3:25
10.	"An Tagen wie diesen"	On days like these	5:12
11.	"Lagerfeld Flow" (featuring Bushido & Shindy)		3:24
12.	"Reich & schön" (featuring Emory)	Rich & beautiful	2:49
13.	"Waschraum" (Skit with SpongeBob)	Washroom	2:14
14.	"Renate"		3:57
15.	"Das Spiel" (featuring Emory)	The Game	3:29
16.	"Boss" (featuring Bushido)		2:59
17.	"Unter Palmen" (featuring Benny Blanko)	Under palms	4:04
18.	"Ich liebe euch"	I love you	3:24
19.	"Auf mich!"	On me	3:26
20.	"Outro" (Skit with Beatzarre & Bushido)		4:09

Premium edition (Bonus tracks)
No.	Title	Title translation	Length
1.	"Kleines Miststück"	Little bitch	2:59
2.	"Das war's" (featuring Emory)	That's it	3:58
3.	"Villa auf Hawaii" (featuring Shindy)	Villa on Hawaii	3:46

== Singles ==
"I Need A Girl (Part Three)" was released as first single from album on March 2, 2012. It was recorded in Berlin, in studio of producer Beatzarre. The musicvideo of the song was filmed in Miami and actually reached over 8 million views on YouTube.

In German charts, the single reached position 29 and in Austrian charts it reached position 44. In Swiss charts, the single took position 39.

The bonus track on the release was the song "Rain On You".

== Charts ==
The album reached the fourth position in German Media Control charts. In Austria and Swiss the album reached on position 7. The video to "I Need A Girl Part 3" actually reached over 8 million views. The video to "Rain on You" actually reached over 3 million views.

=== Weekly charts ===
Chart (2012)	Peak position
Austrian Albums (Ö3 Austria)	4
German Albums (Offizielle Top 100)	4
Swiss Albums (Schweizer Hitparade)	7

=== Year-end charts ===
Chart (2012)	Position
German Albums (Offizielle Top 100)	95

== Links ==
1. musicline.de
2. https://www.amazon.de/Prince-Belvedair-Premium-Edition-inkl/dp/B006ZL4HIO
3. iTunes
4. https://www.amazon.de/Need-Girl-Feat-Mario-Winans/dp/B00742F4MG/ref=sr_1_1?s=music&ie=UTF8&qid=1352652393&sr=1-1
5. https://www.youtube.com/watch?v=SiuGh1RiVxM
6. https://www.youtube.com/watch?v=QrGg2LVvTYs
