= Eko Fresh =

German rapper

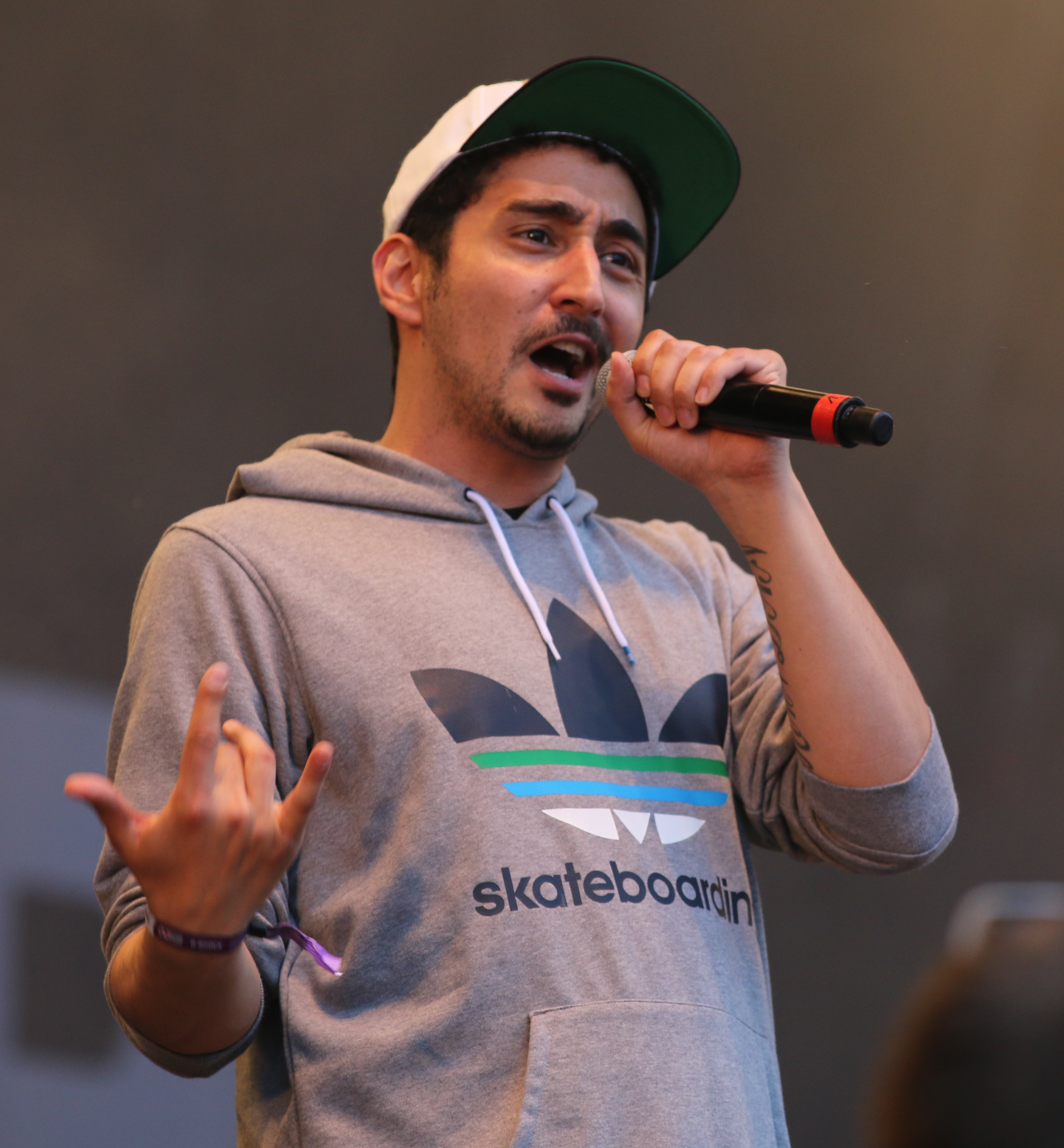
- Eko Fresh in 2015

Background information
- Also known as: Elektro Eko, Eko Freezy
- Born: Ekrem Bora; 3 September 1983 (age 43); Cologne, West Germany
- Genre: German hip hop
- Occupations: Rapper, songwriter
- Labels: Optik Records (2002); German Dream ersguterjunge (2006–2008)
- Website: ekofresh.de

Ekrem Bora (born 3 September 1983), known professionally as Eko Fresh, is a German rapper of Turkish descent.

== Biography ==
Bora was born in Cologne and grew up in Mönchengladbach, raised by his single mother, a postal worker. He began rapping at age 14 and eventually dropped out of school in tenth grade. Afterwards, he started working in a shoe store to make ends meet. While working his retail gig, Bora met Kool Savas, who agreed to produce his 2001 Royal Bunker debut EP, "Jetzt kommen wir auf die Sachen".

The German Stampede Wrestling, a professional wrestling promotion based in Cologne, featured Bora. He had wrestling matches in promotional events including Night in Motion X, Southern Conflict II, X-Limits, Battlefield 2008, and Northern Night since 2007.

Starting in 2010 Eko Fresh released four albums in three years. That was a busy time in his music career. His 2013 album Eksodus did well. The album Eksodus topped the charts in Germany. The album Eksodus also reached the ten in Austria and, in Switzerland.

=== Feuds with other rappers ===
In 2004, Eko Fresh started a feud with his song "Die Abrechnung", where he criticized his former mentors Kool Savas, Optik Records, Bushido and Aggro Berlin. The song was released on 23 December 2004 on Juice CD # 49 and is a diss track against various other rappers, including his former mentor Kool Savas. With the track billing in which he attacked Savas and Optik Records, he laid the foundation for the battle. Savas is suppressing his labelmates and MOR, Sava's former crew, would also have disintegrated for this reason, the statement said. The Berlin label Aggro and Bushido are also dissected in the track. However, he overdid it a little, which Sava's answer track quickly clarified the verdict. Many rappers replied to "Die Abrechnung", including Illmatic with "4Eko" and Fler with "Hollywoodtürke". Rappers from Optik Records also reacted: Caput with "Ich geb n fuck" and Ercandize with "Verdanken".

== Discography ==
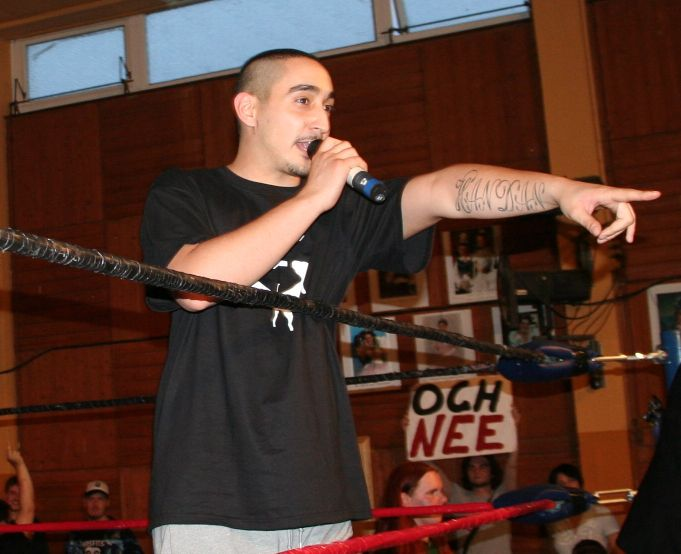
Eko Fresh performing in 2007

Eko Fresh has released 10 studio albums, two collaboration albums, three extended tracks, three compilation albums, 18 singles (including three singles as featured artist) and 45 free tracks.

=== Studio albums ===
| Year | Album details | Peak chart positions | | | Sales |
| Year | Album details | GER | AUT | SWI | Sales |
|---|---|---|---|---|---|
| 2003 | Ich bin jung und brauche das Geld: Released: 3 November 2003; Label: Subword (Sony Music Austria); Formats: Audio CD | 16 | — | — | |
| 2006 | Hart(z) IV: Released: 23 June 2006; Label: Subword; Formats: Audio CD | 24 | 70 | — | |
| 2007 | Ekaveli: Released: 23 November 2007; Label: ersguterjunge/Sony BMG; Formats: CD | 100 | — | — | |
| 2010 | Was kostet die Welt?: Released: 25 June 2010; Label: Seven Days Music (Sony Music); Formats: CD | 36 | — | 97 | |
| 2011 | Ekrem: Released: 2 September 2011; Label: Seven Days Music (Sony Music); Formats: CD | 5 | 33 | 15 | |
| 2012 | Ek to the Roots: Released: 31 August 2012; Label: SONY (Sony Music); Formats: CD | 3 | 10 | 4 | |
| 2013 | Eksodus: Released: 23 August 2013; Label: SONY (Sony Music); Formats: CD | 1 | 6 | 2 | |
| 2014 | Deutscher Traum: Released: 14 November 2014; Label: 99999 (Groove Attack); Formats: CD | 6 | 10 | 7 | |
| 2016 | Freezy: Released: 22 April 2016; Label: GoodToGo; Formats: CD, digital download | 4 | 14 | 13 | |
| 2017 | König von Deutschland: Released: 22 September 2017; Label: German Dream Empire; Formats: CD, digital download | 4 | 16 | 10 | |
| 2018 | Legende (Best Of): Released: 24 August 2018; Label: RECORDJET; Formats: CD, digital download | — | — | — | |
| 2020 | 2020 Bars (The Goat) | — | — | — | |

=== Compilation albums ===
| Year | Title | Chart positions | | | Sales |
| Year | Title | GER | AUT | SWI | Sales |
|---|---|---|---|---|---|
| 2001 | Jetzt kommen wir auf die Sachen | — | — | — | |
| 2003 | König von Deutschland | — | — | — | |
| 2005 | Eko Fresh Presents German Dream Allstars | 56 | — | — | |
| 2005 | Elektro Eko: Fick deine Story | — | — | — | |
| 2005 | Elektro Eko: Fick immer noch deine Story | — | — | — | |

=== Singles ===
As lead artist

| Year | Title | Chart positions | | | Album |
| Year | Title | GER | AUT | SWI | Album |
|---|---|---|---|---|---|
| 2003 | "Ich bin jung und brauche das Geld" (feat. G-Style) | 5 | — | 29 | Ich bin jung und brauche das Geld |
| 2004 | "Die Abrechnung" | — | — | — | |
| 2006 | "Gheddo" (feat. Bushido) | 15 | 40 | — | Hart(z) IV |
| 2006 | "Ek Is Back" (feat. G-Style) | 32 | — | — | Hart(z) IV |
| 2007 | "Ring frei" (feat. Bushido) | 64 | — | — | Ekaveli |
| 2010 | "Königin der Nacht / Arschloch" (feat. Cetin) | 94 | — | — | Was kostet die Welt? |
| 2011 | "Jenseits von Eden" (feat. Nino de Angelo) | 64 | — | — | Ekrem |
| 2012 | "Diese Zwei" (feat. Bushido) | 35 | 53 | 46 | Ek to the Roots |
| 2013 | "Guten Morgen" | 57 | 74 | 62 | Eksodus |
| 2013 | "Quotentürke" | 56 | — | — | Eksodus |
| 2014 | "Joko Diss" (feat. Frauenarzt, Manny Marc & Bass Sultan Hengzt) | 24 | 18 | 35 | non-album track |
| 2014 | "U-Bahn Ficker" (feat. Joko & Klaas) | — | 51 | — | Deutscher Traum |
| 2014 | "Gheddo Reloaded" (feat. Sido) | 74 | — | — | Deutscher Traum |

Collaboration singles

| Year | Title | Chart positions | | | Album |
| Year | Title | GER | AUT | SWI | Album |
|---|---|---|---|---|---|
| 2003 | "Dünya Dönüyor" (with Azra) | — | — | — | Dünya Dönüyor – Die Welt dreht sich |
| 2004 | "Ich will dich" (with Valezka feat. Joe Budden) | 57 | — | — | L.O.V.E. (Life of Valezka & Eko) |
| 2004 | "L.O.V.E." (with Valezka) | 16 | — | — | L.O.V.E. (Life of Valezka & Eko) |
| 2004 | "Eigentlich schön" (with Azra feat. Chablife & Philippe) | — | — | — | Dünya Dönüyor – Die Welt dreht sich |

=== Free tracks ===
| Year | Title | Notes | Length |
|---|---|---|---|
| 2003 | "Renexekution" | Reen (formerly MC Rene) diss track Contains a sample of "Born, Never Asked" by Laurie Anderson | |
| 2004 | "Gegensätze ziehen sich an" (Opposites attract) (feat. Bushido) | | |
| 2004 | "Die Abrechung" (The reckoning) | | |
| 2004 | "Mein Block" (Remix) (My hood) | Instrumental of "Mein Block" by Sido | |
| 2005 | "Nette Kanaken" (Nice wogs) (feat. Chablife) | | |
| 2005 | "I Need a Girl" (feat. G-Style & Caput) | | |
| 2005 | "Die Bestrafung" (The punishment) (feat. Summer Cem & SDiddy) | | |
| 2006 | "Mir steht die Rolex" | | |
| 2006 | "F.L.E.R." | Fler diss track Instrumental of "L.O.V.E" by Eko Fresh & Valezka | |
| 2006 | "Hart hier draußen für 'n Stenz" | | |
| 2006 | "Für HipHop.de" (For Hiphop.de) (feat. G-Style) | Released on the web site Hiphop.de; Aggro Berlin diss track | |
| 2006 | "Warum?" (Why?) (feat. Summer Cem, Farid Urlaub & J-Luv) | | |
| 2006 | "Landsleute" (Farmers) (feat. Summer Cem) | | |
| 2006 | "Schlag Alarm" (Set off the alarm) (feat. Ramsi Aliani) | | |
| 2006 | "Hartz 1" (feat. Capkekz & SD) | | |
| 2007 | "Eksclusive" | | |
| 2007 | "Toy Soldier" | Instrumental of "Like Toy Soldiers" by Eminem | |
| 2007 | "EkAttack" (feat. Hakan Abi) | | |
| 2007 | "Vielen Dank" (Thank you very much) (feat. Hakan Abi) | | |
| 2008 | "200 Bars" (200 bars) | Instrumental of "Shook Ones Part 2" by Mobb Deep | 9:17 |
| 2008 | "Alles oder nichts" (All or nothing) (feat. Kay One) | | |
| 2008 | "Es ist hart" (It's hard) (feat. Ado) | | |
| 2008 | "Wir killen" (We killing) (feat. Ado & Hakan Abi) | | |
| 2008 | "16 Bars Exclusive" (feat. Capkekz, Summer Cem, Farid Bang & Ice H) | | |
| 2008 | "Ich steh zu meinem Wort" | | |
| 2008 | "Ich bleibe hier" (I stay here) (feat. Intikam) | | |
| 2008 | "Mein Lifestyle" (My lifestyle) | | |
| 2008 | "Hollywood Türke" (Hollywood Turk) | | |
| 2008 | "Weil der Himmel weint" (Because heaven cries) (feat. Sharief) | | |
| 2008 | "Pimp der Branx" | | |
| 2008 | "Cologne State of Mind" | | |
| 2008 | "Harte Zeiten" (Hard times) (feat. Crazy Kanaks) | | |
| 2008 | "6 Meter 90" (feat. JokA) | | |
| 2009 | "Grembranxshop Exclusive" | | |
| 2009 | "Mein Präsident steht auf" (feat. Summer Cem) | | |
| 2009 | "Ich bin weg von Bushido" (I am away from Bushido) | | |
| 2009 | "germandreamer.de-Exklusive" (feat. Capkekz & Hakan Abi) | | |
| 2009 | "DBD" (feat. Sentino) | | |
| 2009 | "Changes" (feat. Sentino) | | |
| 2009 | "24 Bars Exklusive" | | |
| 2009 | "Day 'n Nite" (Remix) | | |
| 2009 | "Wo ich bleib" (Where I stay) (feat. El Chicko & Ado) | | |
| 2009 | "Space Is On" | | |
| 2009 | "Mickey Rourke" | | |
| 2009 | "Was weißt du davon" (What do you know about) (feat. Sharief & Farid Bang) | | |
| 2010 | "Angie" | | |
| 2010 | "Der Einspruch" (The appeal) | Instrumental of "Das Urteil" by Kool Savas | |
| 2010 | "Wavin' Flag" (Remix) | | |
| 2010 | "Sachen gibt's" | | |
| 2010 | "Leg das Mic weg" (Put the mic away) | | |
| 2010 | "Mach 'n Taui" (feat. PA Sports) | | |
| 2010 | "Keinen Swagger wie ich" | Instrumental of "They Don't Care About Us" by Michael Jackson | 2:36 |
| 2010 | "Americano Mix" | Remix of "We No Speak Americano" by Yolanda Be Cool & DCUP | 4:30 |
| 2010 | "I Need a Dollar" | Remix of "I Need a Dollar" by Aloe Blacc | |
| 2010 | "Over the Rainbow" | Remix of "Over the Rainbow" by Israel Kamakawiwoʻole, original by Judy Garland | 5:04 |
| 2011 | "300 Bars" | | 13:05 |
| 2011 | "500 Bars" | | 22:20 |
| 2012 | "Schalt die Cam an" (Turn the cam on) (Ill-yes & Aymen feat. Eko Fresh) | | |
| 2012 | "Scheibenwischer an" | | |
| 2012 | "700 Bars" (produced by Phat Crispy) | Used samples: Part 1: "Make Me Say It Again Girl" by The Isley Brothers; Part 2: "Wildflower" by Hank Crawford; Part 4: "Rock On" by Funkdoobiest | 30:02 |
| 2014 | "Handys runter Hände hoch" (Phones down, hands up) (feat. MoTrip) (prod. by Isy B) | | |
| 2014 | "WTF" (feat. Massiv) | | |
