= Kay One =

German rapper (born 1984)

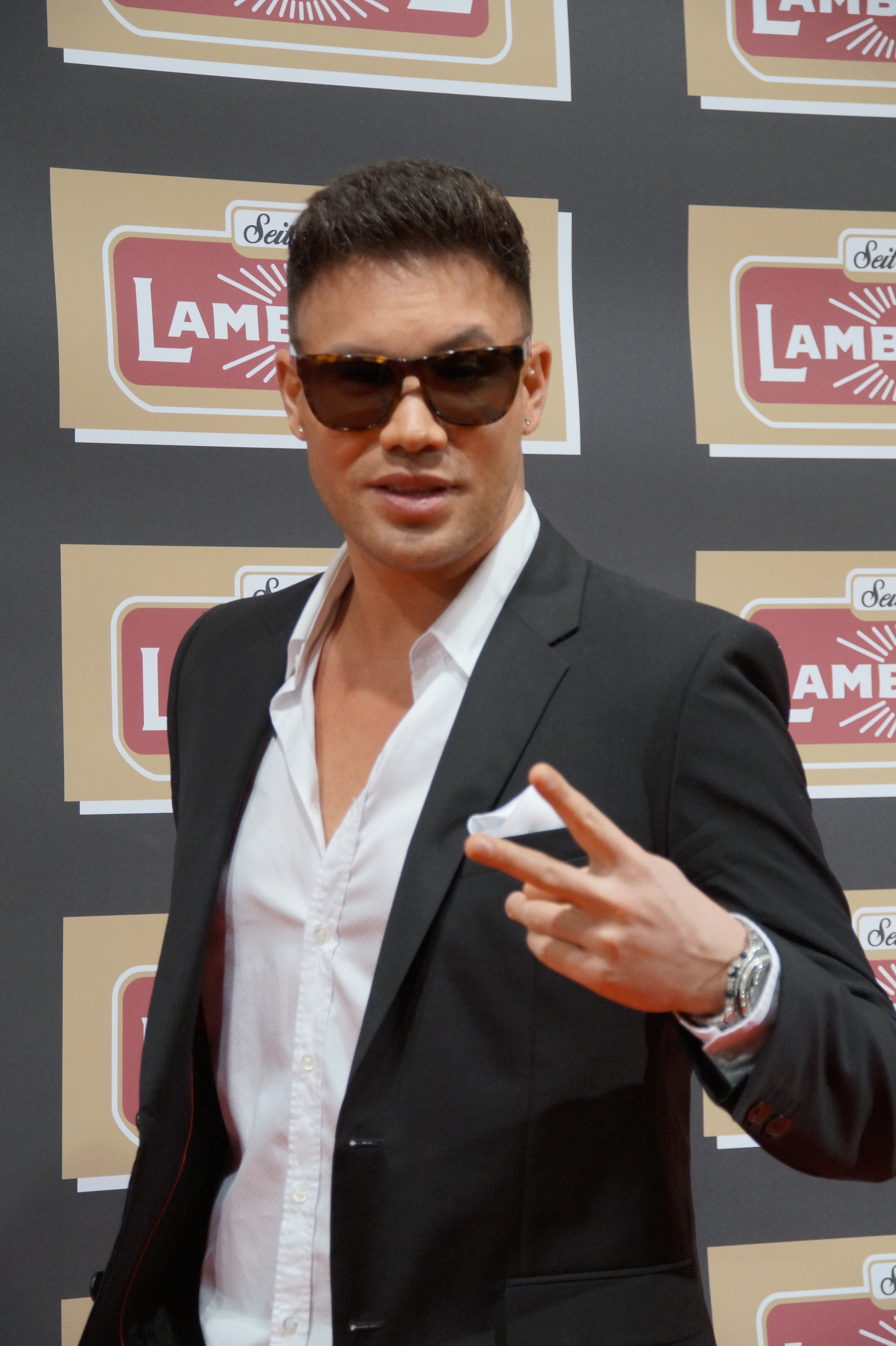
- Kay One in 2016

Background information
- Also known as: Prince Kay One
- Born: Kenneth Glöckler; 7 September 1984 (age 41); Friedrichshafen, West Germany
- Genres: Hip hop
- Occupation: Rapper
- Years active: 2001–present
- Website: princekayone.de

Kenneth Glöckler (born 7 September 1984) is a German rapper known as Kay One. He is also known as Prince Kay One.

== Life and career ==
=== 1984–2006: Early life, Royal Bunker and German Dream ===
Kay One was born in Friedrichshafen as second son to his German father and Filipino mother. He grew up in Ravensburg. He began to rap as a 13-year-old, when he was with his brother and a friend in the woods. They began to freestyle about their experience they had throughout the day.

In 2001, at age 16, he attended the Royal Rumble in Stuttgart, the biggest rap competition in Germany, and won after several battles. During that time, he and fellow rapper Jaysus had formed the duo Chablife. At age 17, Kay One and Jaysus signed to underground hip hop label Royal Bunker.

However he left Royal Bunker in 2005 and moved to Cologne, where contacted Eko Fresh and later signed to his label German Dream Entertainment. Kay One later left German Dream too, due to the failure of his commercial success. Because of financial problems, he moved back to his home town in Lake Constance. In late December 2006, he met rapper Bushido and signed in 2007 to ersguterjunge.

=== 2007–2009: ersguterjunge and rise to fame ===
Kay One gained popularity with guest appearances on his labelmates albums and with free tracks on the internet. His popularity rose due to his close collaborations with Bushido on the labelsampler ersguterjunge Sampler Vol. 3 – Alles Gute kommt von unten, with the lead single "Alles Gute kommt von unten" (with Bushido and Chakuza) reaching the single charts in Germany and Austria. He later served as Bushido's back-up during his live performances. Kay One won the Juice Awards in the category "Newcomer of 2008", because of his many leaked freetracks on the internet.

=== 2010–2011: Kenneth allein zu Haus and Berlins Most Wanted ===
On 7 May 2010 he released his debut album Kenneth allein zu Haus with guest appearances such as Fler, Bushido, Philippe Heithier, his former partner Benny Blanko. The song "Style & das Geld", that featured Bushido was released as promotional single. Lead single "Ich brech die Herzen" reached #67 in Germany .

Kay One joined the group Berlins Most Wanted with Bushido and Fler in late 2010. The group already existed in 2001, composed of Bushido, King Orgasmus One and Bass Sultan Hengzt. The two singles "Berlins Most Wanted" and "Weg eines Krieges" were released on 8 October and the group's album Berlins Most Wanted was released on 22 October.

=== 2012–present: Prince of Belvedair, the split-up with ersguterjunge and AP ===
Kay One announced in early 2012 his album Prince of Belvedair, which was released in March 2012 by ersguterjunge. The first single "I Need a Girl (Part Three)", featuring American R&B singer Mario Winans, released on 17 February and ranked #29 in the German charts.

On 30 March 2012 Kay One's videos, along with millions of their views, have been removed from Bushido's YouTube channel. Bushido tweeted recently: "I don't have beef, with anyone". Following that, Kay One reacted via Facebook:

Some people are scared, that I become far too successful. 60 million clicks like fallen off the face of the earth (...) You can remove the videos, but not me (...) The truth will come out soon. Everyone in Germany will find out what happened (...)

The statement ends with the word "exguterjunge".

Bushido tweeted hours later: "Kay is not an exguterjunge for me, my doors are open for him". Kay One's answer via Facebook: "(...) Therefore you banned all my videos, with over 60.000.000 views (...)". Also Shindy, who has been recently signed to ersguterjunge, left the label.

On 10 April Kay One left ersguterjunge via Facebook. Five days prior to this, Bushido announced the trademark of the phrase "Kay One" on the German Patent and Trade Mark Office.

On 24 November 2012, released a video featuring American rapper Red Café, titled Bottles & Models.

== Discography ==
- Kenneth allein zu Haus (2010)
- Berlins Most Wanted (with Berlins Most Wanted) (2010)
- Prince of Belvedair (2012)
- Rich Kidz (as Prince Kay One) (2013)
- Jung genug um drauf zu scheissen (2015)
- Der Junge von damals (2016)
- Makers Gonna Make (2018)
